= List of Villanova Wildcats football seasons =

The following is a list of Villanova Wildcats football seasons.

== Seasons ==
Year	Coach	Overall	Conference	Standing	Bowl/playoffs	Coaches^{#}	AP^{°}
Villanova Wildcats (NCAA University Division / Division I / I-A independent) (1894–1980)
1894	Mike Murphy	1–0					
1895	James A. McDonald	4–2					
1896	James A. McDonald	10–4					
1897	John F. Bagley	3–5–1					
1898	John F. Bagley	2–4–1					
1899	Dick Nallin	7–2–1					
1900	John Powers & John J. Egan	5–2–2					
1901	John J. Egan	2–3					
1902	Richard Kelly & Timothy O'Rourke	4–3					
1903	Martin Caine	2–2					
1904	Fred Crolius	4–2–1					
1905	Fred Crolius	3–7					
1906	Fred Crolius	3–7					
1907	Fred Crolius	1–5–1					
1908	Fred Crolius	1–6					
1909	Fred Crolius	3–2					
1910	Fred Crolius	0–4–2					
1911	Fred Crolius	0–5–1					
1912	Charles McGeehan	3–3					
1913	Ted St. Germaine	4–2–1					
1914	Dutch Sommer	4–3–1					
1915	Dutch Sommer	6–1					
1916	Edward Bennis	1–8					
1917	Thomas Reap	0–3–2					
1918	Thomas Reap	3–2					
1919	Thomas Reap	5–3–1					
1920	Thomas Reap	1–5–1					
1921	Allie Miller	6–1–2					
1922	Allie Miller	5–3–1					
1923	Hugh McGeehan	0–7–1					
1924	Dutch Sommer	2–5–1					
1925	Harry Stuhldreher	6–2–1					
1926	Harry Stuhldreher	6–2–1					
1927	Harry Stuhldreher	6–1					
1928	Harry Stuhldreher	7–0–1					
1929	Harry Stuhldreher	7–2–1					
1930	Harry Stuhldreher	5–5					
1931	Harry Stuhldreher	4–3–2					
1932	Harry Stuhldreher	7–2					
1933	Harry Stuhldreher	7–2–1					
1934	Harry Stuhldreher	3–4–2					
1935	Harry Stuhldreher	7–2					
1936	Clipper Smith	7–2–1					
1937	Clipper Smith	8–0–1			T Bacardi		6
1938	Clipper Smith	8–0–1					18
1939	Clipper Smith	6–2					
1940	Clipper Smith	4–5					
1941	Clipper Smith	4–4					
1942	Clipper Smith	4–4					
1943	Jordan Olivar	5–3					
1944	Jordan Olivar	4–4					
1945	Jordan Olivar	4–4					
1946	Jordan Olivar	6–4					
1947	Jordan Olivar	6–3–1			L Great Lakes		
1948	Jordan Olivar	8–2–1			W Harbor		
1949	Jim Leonard	8–1					13
1950	Jim Leonard	4–5					
1951	Art Raimo	5–3					
1952	Art Raimo	7–1–1					
1953	Art Raimo	4–6					
1954	Frank Reagan	1–9					
1955	Frank Reagan	1–9					
1956	Frank Reagan	5–4					
1957	Frank Reagan	3–6					
1958	Frank Reagan	6–4					
1959	Frank Reagan & Joseph Rogers #	1–9					
1960	Alexander F. Bell	2–8					
1961	Alexander F. Bell	8–2			W Sun		
1962	Alexander F. Bell	7–3			L Liberty		
1963	Alexander F. Bell	5–4					
1964	Alexander F. Bell	6–2					
1965	Alexander F. Bell	1–8					
1966	Alexander F. Bell	6–3					
1967	Jack Gregory	4–6					
1968	Jack Gregory	6–4					
1969	Jack Gregory	6–3					
1970	Lou Ferry	9-2					
1971	Lou Ferry	6-4-1					
1972	Lou Ferry	2-9					
1973	Lou Ferry	3-8					
1974	Lou Ferry & Jim Weaver #	3-8					
1975	Dick Bedesem	4-7					
1976	Dick Bedesem	6-4-1					
1977	Dick Bedesem	4-7					
1978	Dick Bedesem	5-6					
1979	Dick Bedesem	5-6					
1980	Dick Bedesem	6-5					
Villanova Wildcats (No Team) (1981–1984)
Villanova Wildcats (NCAA Division III independent) (1985–1986)
1985	Andy Talley	4-0					
1986	Andy Talley	8-1					
Villanova Wildcats (NCAA Division I-AA independent) (1987)
1987	Andy Talley	6-4					
Villanova Wildcats (Yankee Conference) (1988–1996)
1988	Andy Talley	5-5-1	4–4	T–3rd			
1989	Andy Talley	8-4	6–2	T–1st	L NCAA Division I-AA First Round		16
1990	Andy Talley	6-5	5–3	T–2nd			
1991	Andy Talley	10-2	7–1	T–1st	L NCAA Division I-AA First Round		7
1992	Andy Talley	9-3	6–2	2nd	L NCAA Division I-AA First Round		10
1993	Andy Talley	3-8	1–7	6th (Mid-Atlantic)			
1994	Andy Talley	5-6	2–6	5th (Mid-Atlantic)			
1995	Andy Talley	3-8	2–6	5th (Mid-Atlantic)			
1996	Andy Talley	8-4	6–2	T–2nd (Mid-Atlantic)	L NCAA Division I-AA First Round		14
Villanova Wildcats (Atlantic 10 Conference) (1997–2006)
1997	Andy Talley	12-1	8–0	1st (Mid-Atlantic)	L NCAA Division I-AA Quarterfinal		1
1998	Andy Talley	6-5	4–4	T–2nd (Mid-Atlantic)			
1999	Andy Talley	7-4	6–2	3rd			24
2000	Andy Talley	5-6	3–5	7th			
2001	Andy Talley	8-3	7–2	T–1st			20
2002	Andy Talley	11-4	6–3	3rd	L NCAA Division I-AA Semifinal		4
2003	Andy Talley	7-4	5–4	T–4th			25
2004	Andy Talley	6-5	3–5	4th (South)			
2005	Andy Talley	4-7	2–6	6th (South)			
2006	Andy Talley	6-5	5–3	2nd (South)			
Villanova Wildcats (Colonial/Coastal Athletic Association) (2007–2025)
2007	Andy Talley	7-4	5–3	T–3rd (South)			
2008	Andy Talley	10-3	7–1	2nd (South)	L NCAA Division I Quarterfinal	6	6
2009	Andy Talley	14-1	7–1	T–1st (South)	W NCAA Division I Championship	1	1
2010	Andy Talley	9-5	5–3	T–3rd	L NCAA Division I Semifinal	3	3
2011	Andy Talley	2-9	1–7	10th			
2012	Andy Talley	8-4	6–2	T–1st	L NCAA Division I First Round	16	15
2013	Andy Talley	6-5	5–3	4th			
2014	Andy Talley	11-3	7–1	2nd	L NCAA Division I Quarterfinal	7	7
2015	Andy Talley	6-5	5-3	T–4th			
2016	Andy Talley	9-4	6-2	T–2nd	L NCAA Division I Second Round	13	11
2017	Mark Ferrante	5-6	3-5	T–7th			
2018	Mark Ferrante	5-6	2-6	T–10th			
2019	Mark Ferrante	9-4	5-3	T–3rd	L NCAA Division I First Round	15	15
2020	Mark Ferrante	2-2	2–2	3rd (North)		18	16
2021	Mark Ferrante	10–3	7-1	T–1st	L NCAA Division I Quarterfinal	8	8
2022	Mark Ferrante	6-5	4-4	T–6th		-	-
2023	Mark Ferrante	10–3	7-1	T–1st	L NCAA Division I Quarterfinal	6	6
2024	Mark Ferrante	10–4	6-2	T–3rd	L NCAA Division I Second Round	12	11
2025	Mark Ferrante	12–3	7-1	2nd	L NCAA Division I Semifinal	4	4
Villanova Wildcats (Patriot League) (2026–present)
2026	Mark Ferrante	0-0	0-0				
Total:		682–510–41					
National championship Conference title Conference division title or championship game berth
^{†}Indicates Bowl Coalition, Bowl Alliance, BCS, or CFP / New Years' Six bowl.; ^{#}Rankings from final Coaches Poll.

# denotes interim head coach

== Coaching history ==
Coach	Years	Seasons	Record	Pct.	Bowls/Playoffs
Mike Murphy	1894	1	1-0	1.000	
James A. McDonald	1895-1896	2	14-6	.700	
John F. Bagley	1897-1898	2	5-9-2	.375	
Dick Nallin	1899	1	7-2-1	.750	
John Powers	1900	1	5-1-3	.722	
John J. Egan	1900-1901	1	2-3	.400	
Richard Kelly & Timothy O'Rourke	1902	1	4-3	.571	
Martin Caine	1903	1	2-2	.500	
Fred Crolius	1904-1911	8	15-38-5	.302	
Charles McGeehan	1912	1	3-3	.500	
Ted St. Germaine	1913	1	4-2-1	.643	
Dutch Sommer	1914-1915	2	10-4-1	.700	
Edward Bennis	1916	1	1-8	.111	
Thomas Reap	1917-1920	4	9-12-5	.442	
Allie Miller	1921-1922	2	11-4-3	.694	
Hugh McGeehan	1923	1	0-7-1	.063	
Dutch Sommer	1924	1	2-5-1	.313	
Harry Stuhldreher	1925-1935	11	65-25-9	.702	
Clipper Smith	1936-1942	7	41-17-3	.697	0-0-1
Jordan Olivar	1943-1948	6	33-20-2	.618	1-1
Jim Leonard	1949-1950	2	12-6	.667	
Art Raimo	1951-1953	3	16-10-1	.611	
Frank Reagan	1953-1959	6	16-36	.308	
Joseph Rogers (interim)	1959	1	1-5	.167	
Alexander F. Bell	1960-1966	7	35-30	.538	1-1
Jack Gregory	1967-1969	3	16-13	.552	
Lou Ferry	1970-1973	4	20-23-1	.466	
Jim Weaver	1974	1	3-5	.375	
Lou Ferry (interim)	1974	1	0-3	.000	
Dick Bedesem	1975-1980	6	30-35-1	.462	
Andy Talley	1985-2016	32	230-137-1	.626	12-11
Mark Ferrante	2017-Present	9	69-36	.657	6-5
Totals	1894-Present	128	682-510-41	.570	20-18-1
