= 2019 Colonial Athletic Association football season =

2019 CAA football season
- League: NCAA Division I Football Championship
- Sport: Football
- Duration: August 29, 2019 – November 23, 2019
- Teams: 12

CAA football seasons
- ← 2018 2020 →

2019 Colonial Athletic Association football standings
	Conf.			Overall
Team	W		L	W		L
No. 2 James Madison $^	8	–	0	14	–	2
No. 18 Albany ^	6	–	2	9	–	5
No. 15 Villanova ^	5	–	3	9	–	4
New Hampshire	5	–	3	6	–	5
Towson	4	–	4	7	–	5
Maine	4	–	4	6	–	6
Elon	4	–	4	5	–	6
Richmond	4	–	4	5	–	7
Delaware	3	–	5	5	–	7
William & Mary	3	–	5	5	–	7
Stony Brook	2	–	6	5	–	7
Rhode Island	0	–	8	2	–	10
$ – Conference champion; ^ – FCS playoff participant; Rankings from STATS Poll

The 2019 Colonial Athletic Association football season was the thirteenth season of football for the Colonial Athletic Association (CAA) and part of the 2019 NCAA Division I FCS football season.

== Head coaches ==
Team	Coach	Season	Overall Record	Record at School	CAA Record
Albany	Greg Gattuso	6th	121–64 (.654)	24–32 (.429)	12–28 (.300)
Delaware	Danny Rocco	3rd	104–51 (.671)	14–9 (.609)	36–21 (.632)
Elon	Tony Trisciani	1st	0–0 (–)	0–0 (–)	0–0 (–)
James Madison	Curt Cignetti	1st	67–26 (.720)	0–0 (–)	10–5 (.667)
Maine	Nick Charlton	1st	0–0 (–)	0–0 (–)	0–0 (–)
New Hampshire	Sean McDonnell	21st	154–95 (.618)	154–95 (.618)	98–65 (.601)
Rhode Island	Jim Fleming	6th	34–44 (.436)	13–43 (.232)	9–31 (.225)
Richmond	Russ Huesman	3rd	69–49 (.585)	10–12 (.455)	6–10 (.375)
Stony Brook	Chuck Priore	14th	123–75 (.621)	84–67 (.556)	26–22 (.542)
Towson	Rob Ambrose	11th	62–66 (.484)	59–59 (.500)	38–42 (.475)
Villanova	Mark Ferrante	3rd	10–12 (.455)	10–12 (.455)	5–11 (.313)
William & Mary	Mike London	1st	62–61 (.504)	0–0 (–)	13–3 (.813)

== Rankings ==
Legend
	Increase in ranking
	Decrease in ranking
	Not ranked previous week
RV	Receiving votes

		Pre	Wk 1	Wk 2	Wk 3	Wk 4	Wk 5	Wk 6	Wk 7	Wk 8	Wk 9	Wk 10	Wk 11	Wk 12	Wk 13	Final
Albany	S								RV	RV	RV		RV	RV	25	18
Albany	C									RV	RV		RV	RV	RV	20
Delaware	S	22	21	18	20	20	19	15	24	19	RV	RV				
Delaware	C	23	21	T–18	20	19	18	15	24	19	RV					
Elon	S	21	RV	25	22	24	RV	RV	RV	RV	RV	RV				
Elon	C	21	RV	RV	22	24	RV		RV		RV					
James Madison	S	2	2	2	2	2	2	2	2	2	2	2	2	2	2	2
James Madison	C	2	2	2	2	2	2	2	2	2	2	2	2	2	2	2
Maine	S	7	6	7	12	T–12	20	18	RV		RV			RV		RV
Maine	C	7	6	9	16	16	22	20	RV							
New Hampshire	S	RV	RV					RV	22	RV	RV	23	RV	RV	RV	RV
New Hampshire	C	RV	RV					RV	23	RV	RV	25	RV			
Rhode Island	S	RV														
Rhode Island	C		RV													
Richmond	S	RV	RV						RV		RV	RV	RV			
Richmond	C		RV										RV			
Stony Brook	S	RV	RV	RV	RV	RV	24	22	RV		20	RV				
Stony Brook	C	RV	RV	RV	RV	RV	24	23	RV		RV	RV				
Towson	S	11	8	8	5	10	9	9	18	16	21	21	20	19	RV	RV
Towson	C	12	9	8	5	10	T–10	9	20	17	22	21	21	20	RV	RV
Villanova	S	RV	24	22	18	8	5	5	7	5	11	18	13	10	8	15
Villanova	C		RV	23	18	13	8	7	7	6	11	19	16	14	10	15
William & Mary	S				RV											
William & Mary	C		RV		RV											

== Regular season ==
Index to colors and formatting
CAA member won
CAA member lost
CAA teams in **bold**

All times Eastern time.

Rankings reflect that of the STATS FCS poll for that week.

=== Week Zero ===
Date	Time	Visiting team	Home team	Site	Result	Attendance	Reference
August 24	noon	**Villanova**	No. 13 Colgate	Andy Kerr Stadium • Hamilton, NY	**W** 34–14	4,519	

=== Week One ===
Date	Time	Visiting team	Home team	Site	Result	Attendance	Reference
August 29	7:00 p.m.	**Albany**	Central Michigan	Kelly/Shorts Stadium • Mount Pleasant, MI	**L** 21–38	12,207	
August 29	7:00 p.m.	Delaware State	**No. 22 Delaware**	Delaware Stadium • Newark, DE	**W** 31–13	15,894	
August 29	7:00 p.m.	Jacksonville	**Richmond**	E. Claiborne Robins Stadium • Richmond, VA	**W** 38–19	7,702	
August 29	7:00 p.m.	Bryant	**Stony Brook**	Kenneth P. LaValle Stadium • Stony Brook, NY	**W** 35–10	9,652	
August 30	6:00 p.m.	Sacred Heart	**No. 7 Maine**	Alfond Stadium • Orono, ME	**W** 42–14	7,478	
August 31	2:00 p.m.	**No. 2 James Madison**	West Virginia	Mountaineer Field • Morgantown, WV	**L** 13–20	61,891	
August 31	2:00 p.m.	**Rhode Island**	Ohio	Peden Stadium • Athens, OH	**L** 20–41	16,665	
August 31	3:00 p.m.	**No. 11 Towson**	The Citadel	Johnson Hagood Stadium • Charleston, SC	**W** 28–21	8,008	
August 31	6:00 p.m.	**No. 21 Elon**	North Carolina A&T	BB&T Stadium • Greensboro, NC	**L** 21–24	16,258	
August 31	6:00 p.m.	Lafayette	**William & Mary**	Zable Stadium • Williamsburg, VA	**W** 30–17	10,167	

Players of the week:

Offensive		Defensive		Rookie		Special teams	
Player	Team	Player	Team	Player	Team	Player	Team
Chris Ferguson	Maine	Jaquan Amos	Villanova	Hollis Mathis	William & Mary	Mitchell Wright	Stony Brook

=== Week Two ===
Date	Time	Visiting team	Home team	Site	Result	Attendance	Reference
September 6	8:00 p.m.	**William & Mary**	Virginia	Scott Stadium • Charlottesville, VA	**L** 17–52	45,250	
September 7	1:00 p.m.	**New Hampshire**	Holy Cross	Fitton Field • Worcester, MA	**L** 10–13	8,372	
September 7	2:00 p.m.	The Citadel	**Elon**	Rhodes Stadium • Elon, NC	**W** 35–28	5,071	
September 7	3:30 p.m.	**Richmond**	Boston College	Alumni Stadium • Chestnut Hill, MA	**L** 13–45	30,111	
September 7	6:00 p.m.	Saint Francis	**No. 2 James Madison**	Bridgeforth Stadium • Harrisonburg, VA	**W** 44–7	22,422	
September 7	6:00 p.m.	**No. 6 Maine**	Georgia Southern	Paulson Stadium • Statesboro, GA	**L** 18–26	17,202	
September 7	6:00 p.m.	North Carolina Central	**No. 8 Towson**	Johnny Unitas Stadium • Towson, MD	**W** 42–3	8,322	
September 7	6:00 p.m.	Lehigh	**No. 24 Villanova**	Villanova Stadium • Villanova, PA	**W** 38–10	8,319	
September 7	7:00 p.m.	Bryant	**Albany**	Bob Ford Field • Albany, NY	**W** 45–3	5,014	
September 7	7:00 p.m.	**No. 21 Delaware**	**Rhode Island**	Meade Stadium • Kingston, RI	**DEL** 44–36^{3OT}	8,511	
September 7	7:30 p.m.	**Stony Brook**	Utah State	Maverik Stadium • Logan, UT	**L** 7–62	22,247	

Players of the week:

Offensive		Defensive		Rookie		Special teams	
Player	Team	Player	Team	Player	Team	Player	Team
Alex James; Aaron Parker	Albany; Rhode Island	Marcus Willoughby	Elon	Solomon Vanhorse	James Madison	Shane McDonough	Towson

=== Week Three ===
Date	Time	Visiting team	Home team	Site	Result	Attendance	Reference
September 14	1:00 p.m.	**Albany**	Monmouth	Kessler Stadium • West Long Branch, NJ	**L** 35–38^{OT}	2,329	
September 14	1:00 p.m.	No. 1 North Dakota State	**No. 18 Delaware**	Delaware Stadium • Newark, DE	**L** 22–47	14,489	
September 14	4:00 p.m.	Morgan State	**No. 2 James Madison**	Bridgeforth Stadium • Harrisonburg, VA	**W** 62–12	19,777	
September 14	6:00 p.m.	**No. 25 Elon**	**Richmond**	E. Claiborne Robins Stadium • Richmond, VA	**ELON** 42–20	7,703	
September 14	6:00 p.m.	Wagner	**Stony Brook**	Kenneth P. LaValle Stadium • Stony Brook, NY	**W** 26–10	5,742	
September 14	6:00 p.m.	**No. 22 Villanova**	Bucknell	Christy Mathewson–Memorial Stadium • Lewisburg, PA	**W** 45–10	3,649	
September 14	6:00 p.m.	Colgate	**William & Mary**	Zable Stadium • Williamsburg, VA	**W** 38–10	6,777	
September 14	7:00 p.m.	**No. 8 Towson**	**No. 7 Maine**	Alfond Stadium • Orono, ME	**TOW** 45–23	6,256	
September 14	7:00 p.m.	**New Hampshire**	Florida International	Riccardo Silva Stadium • Miami, FL	**L** 17–30	11,756	

Players of the week:

Offensive		Defensive		Rookie		Special teams	
Player	Team	Player	Team	Player	Team	Player	Team
Davis Cheek	Elon	Steven Brown	Towson	Hollis Mathis	William & Mary	Shamari Wingard; Bronson Yoder	Elon; William & Mary

=== Week Four ===
Date	Time	Visiting team	Home team	Site	Result	Attendance	Reference
September 21	noon	**No. 22 Elon**	Wake Forest	BB&T Field • Winston-Salem, NC	**L** 7–49	24,079	
September 21	noon	**No. 12 Maine**	Colgate	Andy Kerr Stadium • Hamilton, NY	**W** 35–21	5,606	
September 21	1:00 p.m.	Penn	**No. 20 Delaware**	Delaware Stadium • Newark, DE	**W** 28–27	11,782	
September 21	3:30 p.m.	Lafayette	**Albany**	Bob Ford Field • Albany, NY	**W** 36–7	3,241	
September 21	4:00 p.m.	**No. 2 James Madison**	Chattanooga	Finley Stadium • Chattanooga, TN	**W** 37–14	8,795	
September 21	6:00 p.m.	**Rhode Island**	**New Hampshire**	Wildcat Stadium • Durham, NH	**UNH** 27–24	7,519	
September 21	6:00 p.m.	Fordham	**Stony Brook**	Kenneth P. LaValle Stadium • Stony Brook, NY	**W** 45–10	6,204	
September 21	6:00 p.m.	**No. 18 Villanova**	**No. 5 Towson**	Johnny Unitas Stadium • Towson, MD	**VILL** 52–45	8,811	
September 21	6:00 p.m.	**William & Mary**	East Carolina	Dowdy–Ficklen Stadium • Greenville, NC	**L** 7–19	38,094	

Players of the week:

Offensive		Defensive		Rookie		Special teams	
Player	Team	Player	Team	Player	Team	Player	Team
Daniel Smith	Villanova	AJ Mistler	Albany	Max Brosmer	New Hampshire	Earnest Edwards	Maine

=== Week Five ===
Date	Time	Visiting team	Home team	Site	Result	Attendance	Reference
September 28	12:30 p.m.	**No. 20 Delaware**	Pittsburgh	Heinz Field • Pittsburgh, PA	**L** 14–17	44,141	
September 28	1:00 p.m.	Duquesne	**New Hampshire**	Wildcat Stadium • Durham, NH	**W** 23–6	7,920	
September 28	1:00 p.m.	**Richmond**	Fordham	Coffey Field • The Bronx, NY	**L** 16–23	5,578	
September 28	2:00 p.m.	**No. 2 James Madison**	**No. 24 Elon**	Rhodes Stadium • Elon, NC	**JMU** 45–10	11,926	
September 28	3:30 p.m.	**William & Mary**	**Albany**	Bob Ford Field • Albany, NY	**ALB** 39–31	3,329	
September 28	3:30 p.m.	**No. 12 Maine**	**No. 8 Villanova**	Villanova Stadium • Villanova, PA	**VILL** 33–17	10,071	
September 28	4:00 p.m.	**No. 10 Towson**	No. 9 (FBS) Florida	Ben Hill Griffin Stadium • Gainesville, FL	**L** 0–38	79,126	
September 28	7:00 p.m.	**Stony Brook**	**Rhode Island**	Meade Stadium • Kingston, RI	**SBU** 31–27	6,104	

Players of the week:

Offensive		Defensive		Rookie		Special teams	
Player	Team	Player	Team	Player	Team	Player	Team
Tyquell Fields	Stony Brook	Drew Nickles	Delaware	Solomon Vanhorse	James Madison	Dylan Burns	Albany

=== Week Six ===
Date	Time	Visiting team	Home team	Site	Result	Attendance	Reference
October 5	12:30 p.m.	**Rhode Island**	Brown	Brown Stadium • Providence, RI	**W** 31–28	5,077	
October 5	2:00 p.m.	**Albany**	**Richmond**	E. Claiborne Robins Stadium • Richmond, VA	**RICH** 23–20	8,061	
October 5	3:30 p.m.	**Elon**	**New Hampshire**	Wildcat Stadium • Durham, NH	**UNH** 26–10	17,132	
October 5	3:30 p.m.	**No. 5 Villanova**	**William & Mary**	Zable Stadium • Williamsburg, VA	**VILL** 35–28	9,164	
October 5	6:00 p.m.	**No. 2 James Madison**	**No. 24 Stony Brook**	Kenneth P. LaValle Stadium • Stony Brook, NY	**JMU** 45–38^{OT}	12,812	

Players of the week:

Offensive		Defensive		Rookie		Special teams	
Player	Team	Player	Team	Player	Team	Player	Team
Vito Priore	Rhode Island	Maurice Jackson; Forrest Rhyne	Richmond; Delaware	Oleh Manzyk	New Hampshire	Jake Larson	Richmond

=== Week Seven ===
Date	Time	Visiting team	Home team	Site	Result	Attendance	Reference
October 12	noon	Richmond	**No. 18 Maine**	Alfond Stadium • Orono, ME	**RICH** 24–17	5,126	
October 12	1:30 p.m.	No. 5 Villanova	**No. 2 James Madison**	Bridgeforth Stadium • Harrisonburg, VA	**JMU** 38–24	25,076	
October 12	2:00 p.m.	Albany	**No. 9 Towson**	Johnny Unitas Stadium • Towson, MD	**ALB** 38–21	4,809	
October 12	2:00 p.m.	No. 15 Delaware	**Elon**	Rhodes Stadium • Elon, NC	**ELON** 42–7	5,572	
October 12	4:00 p.m.	Rhode Island	Virginia Tech	Lane Stadium • Blacksburg, VA	**L** 17–34	51,716	
October 12	6:00 p.m.	New Hampshire	**No. 22 Stony Brook**	Kenneth P. LaValle Stadium • Stony Brook, NY	**UNH** 20–14	5,599	

Players of the week:

Offensive		Defensive		Rookie		Special teams	
Player	Team	Player	Team	Player	Team	Player	Team
Davis Cheek; Jeff Undercuffler	Elon; Albany	John Daka; Tyler Dressler	James Madison; Richmond	Max Brosmer	New Hampshire	Drew Sanborn	New Hampshire

=== Week Eight ===
Date	Time	Visiting team	Home team	Site	Result	Attendance	Reference
October 19	1:00 p.m.	**No. 22 New Hampshire**	**No. 24 Delaware**	Delaware Stadium • Newark, DE	**DEL** 16–10	16,730	
October 19	3:30 p.m.	**Rhode Island**	**Albany**	Bob Ford Field • Albany, NY	**ALB** 35–28	7,763	
October 19	3:30 p.m.	**No. 2 James Madison**	**William & Mary**	Zable Stadium • Williamsburg, VA	**JMU** 38–10	11,821	
October 19	4:00 p.m.	Bucknell	**No. 18 Towson**	Johnny Unitas Stadium • Towson, MD	**W** 56–7	6,114	
October 19	6:00 p.m.	**Maine**	Liberty	Williams Stadium • Lynchburg, VA	**L** 44–59	18,657	
October 19	6:00 p.m.	Yale	**Richmond**	E. Claiborne Robins Stadium • Richmond, VA	**L** 27–28	7,510	

Players of the week:

Offensive		Defensive		Rookie		Special teams	
Player	Team	Player	Team	Player	Team	Player	Team
Tom Flacco	Towson	Ron'Dell Carter	James Madison	Joe Fagnano	Maine	D'Angelo Amos	James Madison

=== Week Nine ===
Date	Time	Visiting team	Home team	Site	Result	Attendance	Reference
October 26	1:00 p.m.	**Richmond**	**No. 19 Delaware**	Delaware Stadium • Newark, DE	**RICH** 35–25	15,308	
October 26	1:00 p.m.	**Elon**	**Rhode Island**	Meade Stadium • Kingston, RI	**ELON** 38–13	8,911	
October 26	1:00 p.m.	**William & Mary**	**Maine**	Alfond Stadium • Orono, ME	**MAINE** 34–25	8,123	
October 26	3:30 p.m.	**No. 16 Towson**	**No. 2 James Madison**	Bridgeforth Stadium • Harrisonburg, VA	**JMU** 27–10	23,983	
October 26	3:30 p.m.	**Stony Brook**	**No. 5 Villanova**	Villanova Stadium • Villanova, PA	**SBU** 36–35	5,109	

Players of the week:

Offensive		Defensive		Rookie		Special teams	
Player	Team	Player	Team	Player	Team	Player	Team
Tyquell Fields	Stony Brook	Greg Liggs, Jr.	Elon	Ty Son Lawton	Stony Brook	Aaron Dykes	Richmond

=== Week Ten ===
Date	Time	Visiting team	Home team	Site	Result	Attendance	Reference
November 2	1:00 p.m.	**No. 11 Villanova**	New Hampshire	Wildcat Stadium • Durham, NH	**UNH** 28–20	7,895	
November 2	1:00 p.m.	Merrimack	Rhode Island	Meade Stadium • Kingston, RI	**URI** 42–14	3,091	
November 2	2:00 p.m.	**Delaware**	No. 21 Towson	Johnny Unitas Stadium • Towson, MD	**TOW** 31–24	5,522	
November 2	2:00 p.m.	**William & Mary**	Elon	Rhodes Stadium • Elon, NC	**W&M** 31–29^{5OT}	9,216	
November 2	3:00 p.m.	**No. 20 Stony Brook**	Richmond	E. Claiborne Robins Stadium • Richmond, VA	**RICH** 30–10	7,209	
November 2	3:30 p.m.	**Maine**	Albany	Bob Ford Field • Albany, NY	**MAINE** 47–31	3,315	

Players of the week:

Offensive		Defensive		Rookie		Special teams	
Player	Team	Player	Team	Player	Team	Player	Team
Joe Mancuso	Richmond	Malik Gavek	Rhode Island	Max Brosmer	New Hampshire	Derek Deoul	Maine

=== Week Eleven ===
Date	Time	Visiting team	Home team	Site	Result	Attendance	Reference
November 9	1:00 p.m.	Albany	Delaware	Delaware Stadium • Newark, DE	**ALB** 21–17	13,742	
November 9	1:00 p.m.	Rhode Island	William & Mary	Zable Stadium • Williamsburg, VA	**W&M** 55–19	7,063	
November 9	1:00 p.m.	Richmond	No. 18 Villanova	Villanova Stadium • Villanova, PA	**VILL** 35–28	4,151	
November 9	2:00 p.m.	Maine	Elon	Rhodes Stadium • Elon, NC	**MAINE** 31–17	4,424	
November 9	2:00 p.m.	No. 21 Towson	Stony Brook	Kenneth P. LaValle Stadium • Stony Brook, NY	**TOW** 31–14	5,034	
November 9	3:30 p.m.	No. 23 New Hampshire	No. 2 James Madison	Bridgeforth Stadium • Harrisonburg, VA	**JMU** 54–16	19,660	

Players of the week:

Offensive		Defensive		Rookie		Special teams	
Player	Team	Player	Team	Player	Team	Player	Team
Ben DiNucci	James Madison	Drew Wiley	Villanova	Joe Fagnano; Bronson Yoder	Maine; William & Mary	Nowoola Awopetu	Villanova

=== Week Twelve ===
Date	Time	Visiting team	Home team	Site	Result	Attendance	Reference
November 15	7:00 p.m.	LIU	No. 13 Villanova	Villanova Stadium • Villanova, PA	**VILL** 35–7	3,051	
November 16	noon	**Rhode Island**	Maine	Alfond Stadium • Orono, ME	**MAINE** 34–30	4,908	
November 16	1:00 p.m.	**New Hampshire**	Albany	Bob Ford Field • Albany, NY	**ALB** 24–17	2,486	
November 16	1:00 p.m.	**Stony Brook**	Delaware	Delaware Stadium • Newark, DE	**DEL** 17–10	11,981	
November 16	1:00 p.m.	**No. 20 Towson**	William & Mary	Zable Stadium • Williamsburg, VA	**TOW** 31–10	6,738	
November 16	3:30 p.m.	**Richmond**	No. 2 James Madison	Bridgeforth Stadium • Harrisonburg, VA	**JMU** 48–6	21,947	

Players of the week:

Offensive		Defensive		Rookie		Special teams	
Player	Team	Player	Team	Player	Team	Player	Team
Yeedee Thaenrat	Towson	Dimitri Holloway	James Madison	Will Knight	Delaware	Earnest Edwards	Maine

=== Week Thirteen ===
Date	Time	Visiting team	Home team	Site	Result	Attendance	Reference
November 23	noon	No. 2 James Madison	Rhode Island	Meade Stadium • Kingston, RI	**JMU** 55–21	2,815	
November 23	noon	William & Mary	Richmond	E. Claiborne Robins Stadium • Richmond, VA	**W&M** 21–15^{OT}	7,020	
November 23	1:00 p.m.	Delaware	No. 10 Villanova	Villanova Stadium • Villanova, PA	**VILL** 55–33	5,319	
November 23	1:00 p.m.	Maine	New Hampshire	Wildcat Stadium • Durham, NH	**UNH** 28–10	10,061	
November 23	2:00 p.m.	Albany	Stony Brook	Kenneth P. LaValle Stadium • Stony Brook, NY	**ALB** 31–26	6,171	
November 23	2:00 p.m.	Elon	No. 19 Towson	Johnny Unitas Stadium • Towson, MD	**ELON** 25–23	4,537	

Players of the week:

Offensive		Defensive		Rookie		Special teams	
Player	Team	Player	Team	Player	Team	Player	Team
Changa Hodge; Karl Mofor	Villanova; Albany	Evan Horn	New Hampshire	Isaiah Jones	William & Mary	Skyler Davis	Elon

== FCS playoffs ==
Date	Time	Visiting team	Home team	Round	Site	TV	Result	Attendance	Reference
November 30	1:00 p.m.	No. 17 Central Connecticut	No. 25 Albany	First Round	Bob Ford Field • Albany, NY	ESPN3	W 42–14	1,660	
November 30	4:00 p.m.	No. 8 Villanova	Southeastern Louisiana	First Round	Strawberry Stadium • Hammond, LA	ESPN3	L 44–45	4,173	
December 7	1:00 p.m.	No. 14 Monmouth	No. 2 James Madison	Second Round	Bridgeforth Stadium • Harrisonburg, VA	ESPN3	W 66–21	10,881	
December 7	3:00 p.m.	No. 25 Albany	No. 5 Montana State	Second Round	Bobcat Stadium • Bozeman, MT	ESPN3	L 21–47	12,947	
December 13	7:00 p.m.	No. 6 Northern Iowa	No. 2 James Madison	Quarterfinals	Bridgeforth Stadium • Harrisonburg, VA	ESPN2	W 17–0	8,741	
December 21	6:30 p.m.	No. 4 Weber State	No. 2 James Madison	Semifinals	Bridgeforth Stadium • Harrisonburg, VA	ESPNU	W 30–14	10,487	
January 11	noon	No. 2 James Madison	No. 1 North Dakota State	Championship	Toyota Stadium • Frisco, TX	ABC	L 20–28	17,866	

== Attendance ==
Team	Stadium	Capacity	Game 1	Game 2	Game 3	Game 4	Game 5	Game 6	Game 7	Total	Average	% of Capacity
Albany	Bob Ford Field	8,500	5,014	3,241	3,329	7,763	3,315	2,486		25,148	4,191	49%
Delaware	Delaware Stadium	16,730	15,894	14,489	11,782	16,730	15,308	13,742	11,981	99,926	14,275	85%
Elon	Rhodes Stadium	11,250	5,071	11,926	5,572	9,216	4,424			36,209	7,242	64%
James Madison	Bridgeforth Stadium	24,877	22,422	19,777	25,076	23,983	19,660	21,947		132,865	22,144	89%
Maine	Alfond Stadium	10,000	7,478	6,256	5,126	8,123	4,908			31,531	6,306	63%
New Hampshire	Wildcat Stadium	11,015	7,519	7,920	17,132	7,895	10,061			50,527	10,105	92%
Rhode Island	Meade Stadium	6,555	8,511	6,104	8,911	3,091	2,815			29.432	5,886	90%
Richmond	E. Claiborne Robins Stadium	8,217	7,702	7,703	8,061	7,510	7,209	7,020		45,205	7,534	92%
Stony Brook	Kenneth P. LaValle Stadium	12,300	9,652	5,742	6,204	12,812	5,599	5,034	6,171	51,214	7,316	59%
Towson	Johnny Unitas Stadium	11,198	8,322	8,811	4,809	6,114	5,522	4,537		38,115	6,353	57%
Villanova	Villanova Stadium	12,500	8,319	10,071	5,109	4,151	3,051	5,319		36,020	6,003	48%
William & Mary	Zable Stadium	12,672	10,167	6,777	9,164	11,821	7,063	6,738		51,730	8,622	68%

== NFL draft ==
The following list includes all CAA players who were drafted in the 2020 NFL draft.

Round #	Pick #	NFL team	Player	Position	College
5	171	Houston Texans	Isaiah Coulter	WR	Rhode Island
7	231	Dallas Cowboys	Ben DiNucci	QB	James Madison
