= John Bagley =

John Bagley may refer to:

- John Bagley (basketball) (born 1960), American basketball player
- John F. Bagley, American head college football coach
- John H. Bagley Jr. (1832–1902), United States Representative from New York
- John J. Bagley (1832–1881), American politician
