= 2019 Robert Morris Colonials football team =

American college football season

2019 Robert Morris Colonials football
- Conference: Northeast Conference
- Record: 7–5 (6–1 NEC)
- Head coach: Bernard Clark (2nd season)
- Offensive coordinator: Gabe Luvara (2nd season)
- Defensive coordinator: Dave Plungas (2nd season)
- Home stadium: Joe Walton Stadium

2019 Northeast Conference football standings
| | Conf. | | | Overall |
| Team | W | | L | W | | L |
|---|---|---|---|---|---|---|
| No. 23 Central Connecticut $^ | 7 | – | 0 | 11 | – | 1 |
| Robert Morris | 6 | – | 1 | 7 | – | 5 |
| Duquesne | 4 | – | 3 | 6 | – | 5 |
| Sacred Heart | 4 | – | 3 | 7 | – | 5 |
| Saint Francis (PA) | 3 | – | 4 | 6 | – | 6 |
| Bryant | 3 | – | 4 | 4 | – | 8 |
| Wagner | 1 | – | 6 | 1 | – | 11 |
| LIU | 0 | – | 7 | 0 | – | 10 |
| Merrimack * | 0 | – | 0 | 6 | – | 5 |
$ – Conference champion; ^ – FCS playoff participant; * – Merrimack ineligible for NEC title and FCS postseason play due to transition to NCAA Division I, and also ineligible for NEC title due to not playing a full conference schedule; Rankings from STATS Poll

The 2019 Robert Morris Colonials football team represented Robert Morris University during the 2019 NCAA Division I FCS football season. They were led by second-year head coach Bernard Clark and played their home games at Joe Walton Stadium. They were a member of the Northeast Conference.

== Preseason ==
=== Preseason coaches' poll ===
The NEC released their preseason coaches' poll on July 24, 2019. The Colonials were picked to finish in seventh place.

=== Preseason All-NEC team ===
The Colonials had one player selected to the preseason all-NEC team.

Offense

Matthew Gonzalez – TE/HB

== Schedule ==
| Date | Time | Opponent | Site | TV | Result | Attendance |
|---|---|---|---|---|---|---|
| August 29 | 7:00 p.m. | at Buffalo* | University at Buffalo Stadium; Amherst, NY | ESPN+ | L 10–38 | 18,412 |
| September 7 | 1:00 p.m. | Kentucky State* | Joe Walton Stadium; Moon Township, PA | NEC Front Row | L 7–13 | 2,118 |
| September 14 | 3:00 p.m. | Dayton*^{†} | Joe Walton Stadium; Moon Township, PA | NEC Front Row | L 31–34 | 2,533 |
| September 21 | 1:30 p.m. | at VMI* | Alumni Memorial Field; Lexington, VA | ESPN+ | W 31–21 | 3,900 |
| September 28 | 6:00 p.m. | at No. 22 Youngstown State* | Stambaugh Stadium; Youngstown, OH | ESPN+ | L 10–45 | 12,659 |
| October 12 | 12:00 p.m. | at Saint Francis (PA) | DeGol Field; Loretto, PA | NEC Front Row | W 20–17 ^{OT} | 1,370 |
| October 19 | 12:00 p.m. | at Wagner | Wagner College Stadium; Staten Island, NY | NEC Front Row | W 21–13 | 1,772 |
| October 26 | 12:00 p.m. | Bryant | Joe Walton Stadium; Moon Township, PA | ESPN3 | W 24–20 | 1,496 |
| November 2 | 12:00 p.m. | LIU | Joe Walton Stadium; Moon Township, PA | NEC Front Row | W 28–17 | 934 |
| November 9 | 1:00 p.m. | Duquesne | Joe Walton Stadium; Moon Township, PA | NEC Front Row | W 41–21 | 2,321 |
| November 16 | 12:00 p.m. | at No. 19 Central Connecticut | Arute Field; New Britain, CT | NEC Front Row | L 28–49 | |
| November 23 | 12:00 p.m. | Sacred Heart | Joe Walton Stadium; Moon Township, PA | NEC Front Row | W 16–14 | |
*Non-conference game; ^{†}Homecoming; Rankings from STATS Poll released prior to the game; All times are in Eastern time

== Game summaries ==
=== At Buffalo ===
| | 1 | 2 | 3 | 4 | Total |
|---|---|---|---|---|---|
| Colonials | 7 | 3 | 0 | 0 | 10 |
| Bulls | 21 | 7 | 10 | 0 | 38 |

=== Kentucky State ===
| | 1 | 2 | 3 | 4 | Total |
|---|---|---|---|---|---|
| Thorobreds | 0 | 6 | 7 | 0 | 13 |
| Colonials | 7 | 0 | 0 | 0 | 7 |

=== Dayton ===
| | 1 | 2 | 3 | 4 | Total |
|---|---|---|---|---|---|
| Flyers | 7 | 13 | 7 | 7 | 34 |
| Colonials | 7 | 10 | 7 | 7 | 31 |

=== At VMI ===
| | 1 | 2 | 3 | 4 | Total |
|---|---|---|---|---|---|
| Colonials | 14 | 7 | 7 | 3 | 31 |
| Keydets | 3 | 5 | 6 | 7 | 21 |

=== At Youngstown State ===
| | 1 | 2 | 3 | 4 | Total |
|---|---|---|---|---|---|
| Colonials | 7 | 0 | 3 | 0 | 10 |
| No. 22 Penguins | 7 | 24 | 7 | 7 | 45 |

=== At Saint Francis ===
| | 1 | 2 | 3 | 4 | OT | Total |
|---|---|---|---|---|---|---|
| Colonials | 0 | 3 | 7 | 7 | 3 | 20 |
| Red Flash | 3 | 7 | 0 | 7 | 0 | 17 |

=== At Wagner ===
| | 1 | 2 | 3 | 4 | Total |
|---|---|---|---|---|---|
| Colonials | 7 | 0 | 7 | 7 | 21 |
| Seahawks | 7 | 3 | 0 | 3 | 13 |

=== Bryant ===
| | 1 | 2 | 3 | 4 | Total |
|---|---|---|---|---|---|
| Bulldogs | 10 | 3 | 0 | 7 | 20 |
| Colonials | 0 | 0 | 17 | 7 | 24 |

=== LIU ===
| | 1 | 2 | 3 | 4 | Total |
|---|---|---|---|---|---|
| Sharks | 3 | 14 | 0 | 0 | 17 |
| Colonials | 14 | 0 | 7 | 7 | 28 |

=== Duquesne ===
| | 1 | 2 | 3 | 4 | Total |
|---|---|---|---|---|---|
| Dukes | 0 | 0 | 7 | 14 | 21 |
| Colonials | 7 | 13 | 7 | 14 | 41 |

=== At Central Connecticut ===
| | 1 | 2 | 3 | 4 | Total |
|---|---|---|---|---|---|
| Colonials | 0 | 14 | 0 | 14 | 28 |
| No. 19 Blue Devils | 0 | 14 | 21 | 14 | 49 |

=== Sacred Heart ===
| | 1 | 2 | 3 | 4 | Total |
|---|---|---|---|---|---|
| Pioneers | 7 | 0 | 7 | 0 | 14 |
| Colonials | 0 | 7 | 3 | 6 | 16 |
