= Jason Houghtaling =

American football coach (born 1981)

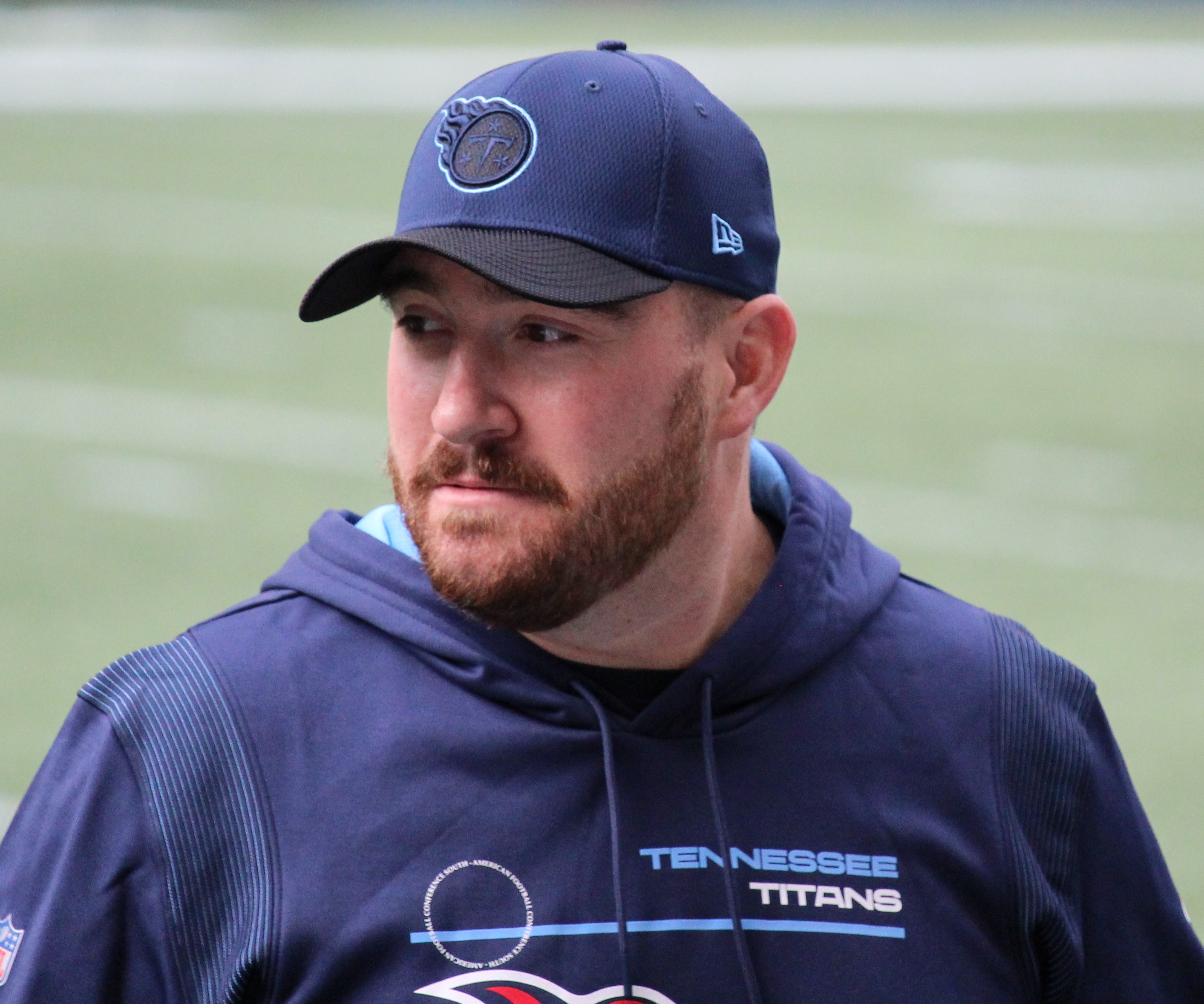
- Houghtaling with the Titans in 2021

New England Patriots
- Title: Assistant offensive line coach

Personal information
- Born: c. 1981 (age 44–45); Windsor, New York, U.S.

Career information
- Position: Defensive lineman
- High school: Windsor Central High School
- College: Lafayette

Career history
- Wagner (2006) Running backs coach; Wagner (2007–2009) Offensive line coach; Troy HS (2010) Head coach; Williams (2011) Offensive coordinator; Wagner (2012) Offensive coordinator; Cornell (2013) Offensive coordinator; Wagner (2014) Offensive coordinator; Wagner (2015–2019) Head coach; Colgate (2020) Offensive line coach; Tennessee Titans (2021–2022) Assistant offensive line coach; Tennessee Titans (2023) Offensive line coach; Chicago Bears (2024) Assistant offensive line coach; New England Patriots (2025–present) Assistant offensive line coach

Jason Houghtaling is an American football coach who is currently the assistant offensive line coach for the New England Patriots of the National Football League (NFL). Houghtaling served as the head football coach at Wagner College from 2015 to 2019, compiling a record of 16–40.

== Coaching career ==
Houghtaling was hired by the Tennessee Titans as an offensive line assistant on February 11, 2021.

On February 5, 2025, Houghtaling was announced as the assistant offensive line coach for the New England Patriots under head coach Mike Vrabel.

== Head coaching record ==
=== College ===
Year	Team	Overall	Conference	Standing	Bowl/playoffs
Wagner Seahawks (Northeast Conference) (2015–2019)
2015	Wagner	1–10	1–5	7th	
2016	Wagner	6–5	4–2	T–3rd	
2017	Wagner	4–7	2–4	T–5th	
2018	Wagner	4–7	3–3	4th	
2019	Wagner	1–11	1–6	7th	
Wagner:		16–40	11–20		
Total:		16–40			
