= Martin Caine =

American football player and coach (1883–1953)

Biographical details
- Born: November 17, 1883; Runcorn, Cheshire, England
- Died: April 7, 1953 (aged 69); Waterbury, Connecticut, U.S.

Playing career
- 1901–1903: Villanova

Coaching career (HC unless noted)
- 1903: Villanova

Head coaching record
- Overall: 2–2

Martin Leonard Caine (November 17, 1883 – April 7, 1953) was an American college football player and coach. He served as the head football coach at Villanova College—now known as Villanova University—in 1903. He compiled a record of 2–2 while serving as a senior player-coach. He died suddenly in 1953. He was Naugatuck, Connecticut's oldest practicing attorney and judge at the time of his death as well as a staunch supporter of the Democratic Party.

== Head coaching record ==
Year	Team	Overall	Conference	Standing	Bowl/playoffs
Villanova Wildcats (Independent) (1903)
1903	Villanova	2–2			
Villanova:		2–2			
Total:		2–2			
