= Hugh McGeehan =

American football player and coach (1894–1948)

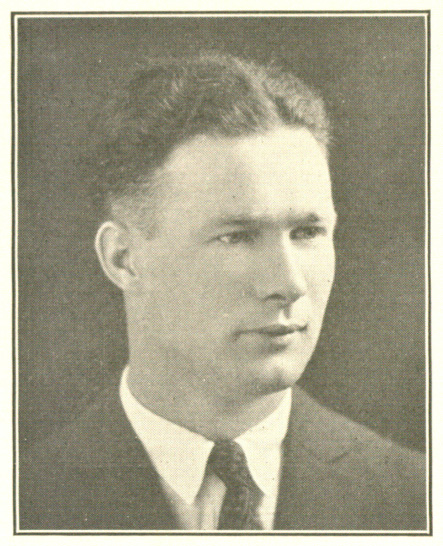
- McGeehan pictured in The Belle Air 1924, Villanova yearbook

Biographical details
- Born: June 8, 1894; Hazleton, Pennsylvania, U.S.
- Died: August 17, 1948 (aged 54); Hazleton, Pennsylvania, U.S.

Playing career
- 1916–1919: Villanova

Coaching career (HC unless noted)
- 1923: Villanova

Head coaching record
- Overall: 0–7–1

Hugh Vincent McGeehan (June 8, 1894 – August 17, 1948) was an American college football player and coach. He served as the head football coach at Villanova College—now known as Villanova University—for one season, in 1923, compiling a record of 0–7–1. McGeehan's brother, Charles McGeehan was Villanova's head football coach in 1912.

== Head coaching record ==
Year	Team	Overall	Conference	Standing	Bowl/playoffs
Villanova Wildcats (Independent) (1923)
1923	Villanova	0–7–1			
Villanova:		0–7–1			
Total:		0–7–1			
