= Edward Bennis =

American football player and sports coach

Biographical details
- Born: July 30, 1885; Philadelphia, Pennsylvania, U.S.
- Died: May 8, 1936 (aged 50); Philadelphia, Pennsylvania, U.S.

Playing career

Football
- 1904–1905: Penn

Coaching career (HC unless noted)

Football
- 1909–1910: Saint Joseph's
- 1912: Georgetown (assistant)
- 1916: Villanova

Basketball
- 1910–1911: Saint Joseph's

Head coaching record
- Overall: 1–8 (football, Villanova only); 6–6 (basketball)

Accomplishments and honors

Championships
- National (1904)

Edward Michael Bennis (July 30, 1885 – May 8, 1936) was an American football player and coach of football and basketball. He served as the head football coach at Villanova College—now known as Villanova University—in 1916, compiling a record of 1–8. Bennis was also the head coach for the Saint Joseph's Hawks men's basketball team for one season (1910–11) and finished with a 6–6 record. In addition to coaching the basketball team, he was also hired in 1909 to coach the St Joe's football team. Bennis was a standout football player at the University of Pennsylvania. He graduated from Penn in 1906.

Bennis later worked in the income tax division of the Internal Revenue Bureau and then as a real estate assessor. He was active in Democratic Party politics in Philadelphia. Bennis died on May 8, 1936, at Germantown Hospital in Philadelphia.

== Head coaching record ==
=== Football ===
Year	Team	Overall	Conference	Standing	Bowl/playoffs
Villanova Wildcats (Independent) (1916)
1916	Villanova	1–8			
Villanova:		1–8			
Total:		1–8			
