= Jim Weaver (athletic director) =

American football player and coach, college athletics administrator (1945–2015)

Biographical details
- Born: March 5, 1945; Harrisburg, Pennsylvania, U.S.
- Died: July 2, 2015 (aged 70); Blacksburg, Virginia, U.S.

Playing career
- 1964–1966: Penn State
- Positions: Center, linebacker

Coaching career (HC unless noted)
- 1967–1972: Penn State (assistant)
- 1973: Iowa State (OC)
- 1974: Villanova

Administrative career (AD unless noted)
- 1983–1991: Florida (associate AD)
- 1991–1994: UNLV
- 1996–1997: Western Michigan
- 1997–2014: Virginia Tech

Head coaching record
- Overall: 3–5

James C. Weaver (March 5, 1945 – July 2, 2015) was an American college football player, coach and college athletics administrator. He served as the head football coach at Villanova University for the first eight games of the 1974 season, finishing with a record of 3–5. Weaver also served as the athletic director at the University of Nevada, Las Vegas (UNLV) from 1991 to 1994, Western Michigan University from 1996 to 1997, and Virginia Tech from 1997 to 2014.

== Career ==
A native of Harrisburg, Pennsylvania, Weaver played college football at Pennsylvania State University under Rip Engle and Joe Paterno. After his playing career, he served as assistant coach under Paterno, from 1967 to 1972. In 1973, Weaver became the offensive coordinator at Iowa State University, before being hired as the head football coach at Villanova University, succeeding Lou Ferry, who remained with team as the defensive line coach. Weaver led Villanova to a record of 3–5 before he was hired in early November 1974, after the disclosure of his intentions to quit at the end of the season and take an administrative position at Clarion State College. Ferry assumed the role of interim head coach for the last three games of the season.

In 1983, Weaver was hired by the University of Florida athletics department in the wake of that school's NCAA sanctions. He later moved to the University of Nevada, Las Vegas (UNLV), where he became the director of athletics in 1991. In 1994, Weaver resigned his position in protest over the hiring of Tim Grgurich as the new men's basketball coach. Tim Grgurich had been an assistant under the controversial Jerry Tarkanian.

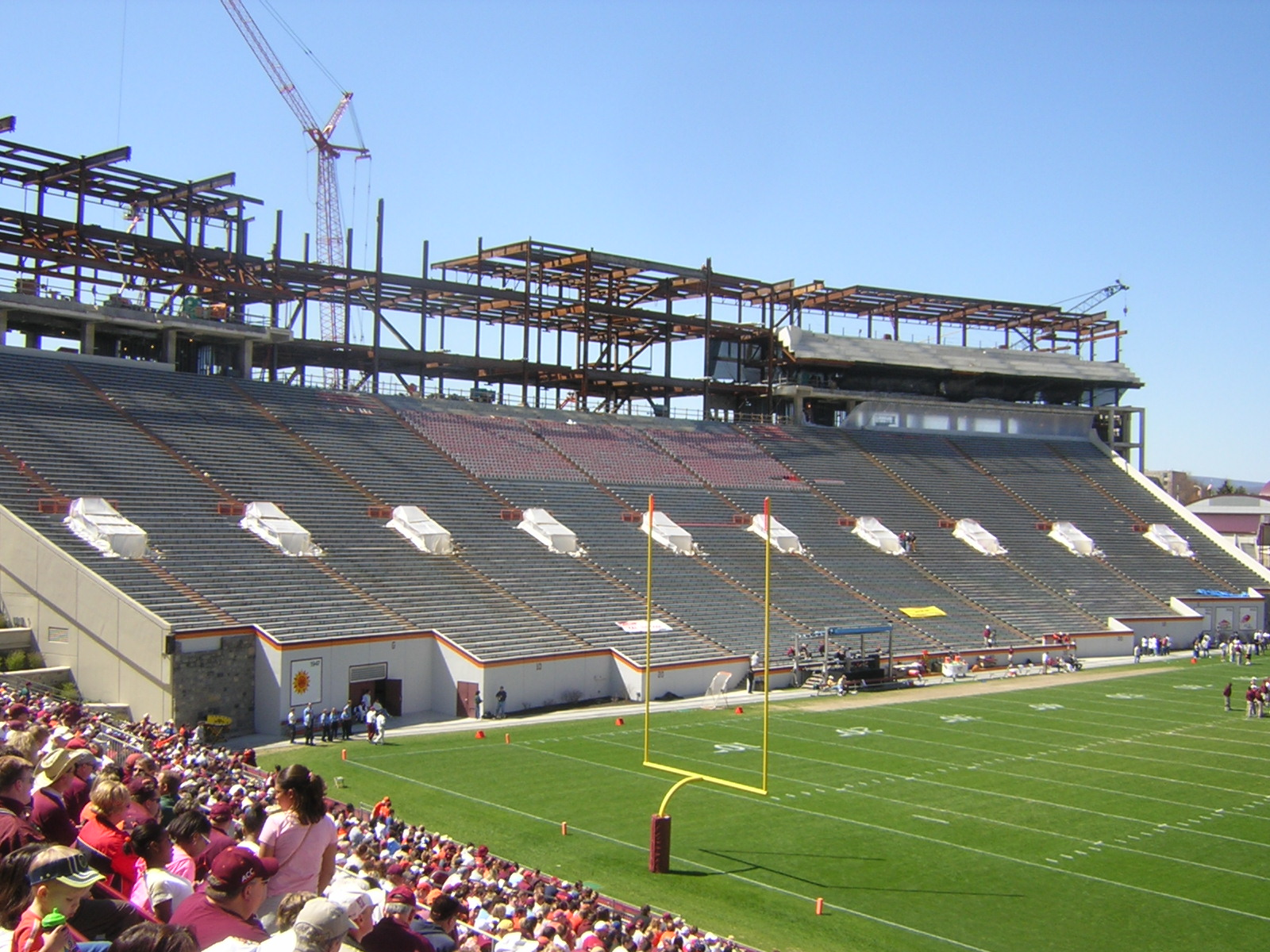
Lane Stadium's 2005 west side expansion project, during the 2005 Spring Game

Following a brief tenure as Western Michigan University's director of athletics, Weaver was hired by Virginia Tech to replace the departing Dave Braine. Under Weaver, Virginia Tech's athletic programs moved from the Atlantic 10 Conference to the Big East Conference and eventually to the Atlantic Coast Conference. Weaver also oversaw two major expansions of Lane Stadium in 2002 and 2005. His accomplishments on behalf of the university led to his posthumous enshrinement into the Virginia Tech Sports Hall of Fame.

Weaver retired due to health concerns in 2014 and was succeeded by Whit Babcock.

== Death ==
Weaver died on July 2, 2015, at the age of 70 after a battle with Parkinson's disease.

== Head coaching record ==
Year	Team	Overall	Conference	Standing	Bowl/playoffs
Villanova Wildcats (Independent) (1974)
1974	Villanova	3–5 (Note: Weaver was fired after the first eight games of the 1974 season. Lou Ferry served as interim head coach for the final three games. Villanova finished with an overall record of 3–8.)			
Villanova:		3–5			
Total:		3–5			
