= 2019 Merrimack Warriors football team =

American college football season

2019 Merrimack Warriors football
- Conference: Northeast Conference
- Record: 6–5 (0–0 NEC)
- Head coach: Dan Curran (7th season)
- Defensive coordinator: Mike Gennetti (15th season)
- Home stadium: Duane Stadium

2019 Northeast Conference football standings
	Conf.			Overall
Team	W		L	W		L
No. 23 Central Connecticut $^	7	–	0	11	–	1
Robert Morris	6	–	1	7	–	5
Duquesne	4	–	3	6	–	5
Sacred Heart	4	–	3	7	–	5
Saint Francis (PA)	3	–	4	6	–	6
Bryant	3	–	4	4	–	8
Wagner	1	–	6	1	–	11
LIU	0	–	7	0	–	10
Merrimack *	0	–	0	6	–	5
$ – Conference champion; ^ – FCS playoff participant; * – Merrimack ineligible for NEC title and FCS postseason play due to transition to NCAA Division I, and also ineligible for NEC title due to not playing a full conference schedule; Rankings from STATS Poll

The 2019 Merrimack Warriors football team represented Merrimack College as first-year member of Northeast Conference (NEC) during the 2019 NCAA Division I FCS football season. Led by seventh-year head coach Dan Curran, the Warriors compiled an overall record of 6–5. Merrimack had a record of 1–3 against NEC opponents, but the Warriors were ineligible for the NEC title, and those games did not count in the conference standings. The team played home games at Duane Stadium in North Andover, Massachusetts.

== Schedule ==
Date	Time	Opponent	Site	TV	Result	Attendance
August 31	6:00 p.m.	Virginia–Lynchburg*	Duane Stadium; North Andover, MA	NEC Front Row	W 45–14	4,047
September 7	6:00 p.m.	at Central Connecticut	Arute Field; New Britain, CT	NEC Front Row	L 37–40	5,114
September 14	12:00 p.m.	at Saint Francis (PA)	DeGol Field; Loretto, PA	NEC Front Row	L 14–42	1,455
September 21	1:00 p.m.	Mayville State*	Duane Stadium; North Andover, MA	NEC Front Row	W 76–7	3,123
September 28	12:30 p.m.	at Lehigh*	Goodman Stadium; Bethlehem, PA	Stadium	L 3–10	4,511
October 5	1:00 p.m.	Bryant	Duane Stadium; North Andover, MA	NEC Front Row	L 17–24	10,172
October 19	2:00 p.m.	at Delaware State*	Alumni Stadium; Dover, DE	ESPN+	W 30–21	1,158
October 26	1:00 p.m.	Presbyterian*	Duane Stadium; North Andover, MA	NEC Front Row	W 24–21	1,721
November 2	1:00 p.m.	at Rhode Island*	Meade Stadium; Kingston, RI	FloSports	L 14–45	3,091
November 16	1:00 p.m.	Franklin Pierce*	Duane Stadium; North Andover, MA	NEC Front Row	W 57–0	1,685
November 23	12:00 p.m.	at LIU	Bethpage Federal Credit Union Stadium; Brookville, NY	NEC Front Row	W 24–10	855
*Non-conference game; All times are in Eastern time

== Preseason ==
=== Preseason coaches' poll ===
The NEC released their preseason coaches' poll on July 24, 2019. The Warriors were not ranked due to their transition to NCAA Division I and their lack of a full conference schedule.

== Game summaries ==
=== Virginia–Lynchburg ===
	1	2	3	4	Total
Dragons	7	0	7	0	14
Warriors	17	14	0	14	45

=== At Central Connecticut ===
	1	2	3	4	Total
Warriors	7	7	7	16	37
Blue Devils	3	21	13	3	40

=== At Saint Francis (PA) ===
	1	2	3	4	Total
Warriors	7	7	0	0	14
Red Flash	7	13	15	7	42

=== Mayville State ===
	1	2	3	4	Total
Comets	0	7	0	0	7
Warriors	21	25	16	14	76

=== At Lehigh ===
	1	2	3	4	Total
Warriors	0	3	0	0	3
Mountain Hawks	0	0	3	7	10

=== Bryant ===
	1	2	3	4	Total
Bulldogs	7	10	7	0	24
Warriors	7	7	3	0	17

=== At Delaware State ===
	1	2	3	4	Total
Warriors	7	17	3	3	30
Hornets	14	7	0	0	21

=== Presbyterian ===
	1	2	3	4	Total
Blue Hose	7	7	0	7	21
Warriors	7	7	0	10	24

=== At Rhode Island ===
	1	2	3	4	Total
Warriors	0	7	0	7	14
Rams	7	7	7	21	42

=== Franklin Pierce ===
	1	2	3	4	Total
Ravens	0	0	0	0	0
Warriors	21	20	10	6	57

=== At LIU ===
	1	2	3	4	Total
Warriors	10	7	0	7	24
Sharks	0	0	0	10	10
