= Timothy O'Rourke =

American football player and coach

Playing career
- 1899–1902: Villanova

Coaching career (HC unless noted)
- 1902: Villanova (co-HC)

Head coaching record
- Overall: 4–3

Timothy O'Rourke was an American college football player and coach. He was born on 04 Jan 1882 in Waterbury, Connecticut, son of Irish Immigrants Timothy O'Rourke and Ellen Allman. He served as the co-head football coach at Villanova College (now known as Villanova University) in 1902 with Richard Kelly, compiling a record of 4–3. He was captain of the 1902 Villanova Wildcats football team.

== Head coaching record ==
Year	Team	Overall	Conference	Standing	Bowl/playoffs
Villanova Wildcats (Independent) (1902)
1902	Villanova	4–3			
Villanova:		4–3			
Total:		4–3			
