= 2019 NCAA Division I FCS football season =

American college football season

2019 NCAA Division I FCS season

Regular season
- Number of teams: 126
- Duration: August 24 – November 30
- Payton Award: North Dakota State quarterback Trey Lance
- Buchanan Award: Montana linebacker Dante Olson

Playoff
- Duration: November 30 – December 21
- Championship date: January 11, 2020
- Championship site: Toyota Stadium, Frisco, Texas
- Champion: North Dakota State

NCAA Division I FCS football seasons
- «2018 2020»

The 2019 NCAA Division I FCS football season, part of college football in the United States, was organized by the National Collegiate Athletic Association (NCAA) at the Division I Football Championship Subdivision (FCS) level. The FCS Championship Game was played on January 11, 2020, in Frisco, Texas. Defending champion North Dakota State completed the regular season undefeated, then won their eighth championship in nine seasons, defeating James Madison, 28-20, for the title.

All FCS teams were allowed to schedule 12 regular season games in the 2019 season. A standard provision of NCAA bylaws allows for 12 regular season games during years having 14 Saturdays in the period starting with the Labor Day (first Monday in September) weekend and ending with the last Saturday of November. This next occurred in 2024.

== Conference changes and new programs ==
| School | 2018 conference | 2019 conference |
|---|---|---|
| Hampton | FCS independent | Big South |
| LIU+ | NE-10 (D-II) | NEC (FCS) |
| Merrimack | NE-10 (D-II) | NEC (FCS) |
| North Alabama | FCS Independent | Big South |
| Savannah State | MEAC (FCS) | SIAC (D-II) |

+ Following the 2018–19 academic year, Long Island University merged the athletic programs of its two campuses—the Division I non-football LIU Brooklyn Blackbirds and Division II football-sponsoring LIU Post Pioneers—into a single Division I program rebranded as the LIU Sharks. The Sharks inherited LIU Brooklyn's membership in the Northeast Conference, with the former Post football team joining the NEC alongside most of LIU's other sports.

== Kickoff game ==
| Date | Visiting team | Home team | Site | Result | Attendance | Ref. |
|---|---|---|---|---|---|---|
| August 24 | Youngstown State | Samford | Cramton Bowl • Montgomery, Alabama (FCS Kickoff) | 45–22 | 12,560 | |
^{#}Rankings from STATS poll released prior to the game.

== FCS team wins over FBS teams ==
Italics denotes FBS teams.

| Date | Visiting team | Home team | Site | Result | Attendance | Ref. |
|---|---|---|---|---|---|---|
| August 29 | Central Arkansas | Western Kentucky | Houchens Industries–L. T. Smith Stadium • Bowling Green, Kentucky | 35–28 | 17,120 | |
| September 7 | Southern Illinois | UMass | Warren McGuirk Alumni Stadium • Amherst, Massachusetts | 45–20 | 10,524 | |
| September 14 | The Citadel | Georgia Tech | Bobby Dodd Stadium • Atlanta, Georgia | 27–24 ^{OT} | 42,871 | |
^{#}Rankings from AP Poll released prior to game.

== Conference standings ==
2019 Big Sky Conference football standings
| | Conf. | | | Overall |
| Team | W | | L | W | | L |
|---|---|---|---|---|---|---|
| No. 3 Weber State +^ | 7 | – | 1 | 11 | – | 4 |
| No. 9 Sacramento State +^ | 7 | – | 1 | 9 | – | 4 |
| No. 4 Montana State ^ | 6 | – | 2 | 11 | – | 4 |
| No. 6 Montana ^ | 6 | – | 2 | 10 | – | 4 |
| Eastern Washington | 6 | – | 2 | 7 | – | 5 |
| Idaho | 3 | – | 5 | 5 | – | 7 |
| Portland State | 3 | – | 5 | 5 | – | 7 |
| UC Davis | 3 | – | 5 | 5 | – | 7 |
| Northern Arizona | 2 | – | 6 | 4 | – | 8 |
| Cal Poly | 2 | – | 6 | 3 | – | 8 |
| Idaho State | 2 | – | 6 | 3 | – | 9 |
| Southern Utah | 2 | – | 6 | 3 | – | 9 |
| Northern Colorado | 2 | – | 6 | 2 | – | 10 |
+ – Conference co-champions; ^ – FCS playoff participant; Although North Dakota was classified as an independent, games against them still counted as Big Sky Conference games.; Rankings from STATS Poll

2019 Big South Conference football standings
| | Conf. | | | Overall |
| Team | W | | L | W | | L |
|---|---|---|---|---|---|---|
| No. 12 Monmouth $^ | 6 | – | 0 | 11 | – | 3 |
| No. 13 Kennesaw State ^ | 5 | – | 1 | 11 | – | 3 |
| Charleston Southern | 4 | – | 2 | 6 | – | 6 |
| Campbell | 3 | – | 3 | 6 | – | 5 |
| Hampton | 1 | – | 5 | 5 | – | 7 |
| Gardner–Webb | 1 | – | 5 | 3 | – | 9 |
| Presbyterian | 1 | – | 5 | 2 | – | 10 |
| North Alabama * | 0 | – | 0 | 4 | – | 7 |
$ – Conference champion; ^ – FCS playoff participant; * North Alabama ineligible for FCS postseason play due to transition to NCAA Division I; Rankings from STATS Poll

2019 Colonial Athletic Association football standings
| | Conf. | | | Overall |
| Team | W | | L | W | | L |
|---|---|---|---|---|---|---|
| No. 2 James Madison $^ | 8 | – | 0 | 14 | – | 2 |
| No. 18 Albany ^ | 6 | – | 2 | 9 | – | 5 |
| No. 15 Villanova ^ | 5 | – | 3 | 9 | – | 4 |
| New Hampshire | 5 | – | 3 | 6 | – | 5 |
| Towson | 4 | – | 4 | 7 | – | 5 |
| Maine | 4 | – | 4 | 6 | – | 6 |
| Elon | 4 | – | 4 | 5 | – | 6 |
| Richmond | 4 | – | 4 | 5 | – | 7 |
| Delaware | 3 | – | 5 | 5 | – | 7 |
| William & Mary | 3 | – | 5 | 5 | – | 7 |
| Stony Brook | 2 | – | 6 | 5 | – | 7 |
| Rhode Island | 0 | – | 8 | 2 | – | 10 |
$ – Conference champion; ^ – FCS playoff participant; Rankings from STATS Poll

2019 Ivy League football standings
| | Conf. | | | Overall |
| Team | W | | L | W | | L |
|---|---|---|---|---|---|---|
| No. 22 Dartmouth + | 6 | – | 1 | 9 | – | 1 |
| No. 25 Yale + | 6 | – | 1 | 9 | – | 1 |
| Princeton | 5 | – | 2 | 8 | – | 2 |
| Penn | 3 | – | 4 | 5 | – | 5 |
| Cornell | 3 | – | 4 | 4 | – | 6 |
| Harvard | 2 | – | 5 | 4 | – | 6 |
| Columbia | 2 | – | 5 | 3 | – | 7 |
| Brown | 1 | – | 6 | 2 | – | 8 |
+ – Conference co-champions; Rankings from STATS Poll

2019 Mid-Eastern Athletic Conference football standings
| | Conf. | | | Overall |
| Team | W | | L | W | | L |
|---|---|---|---|---|---|---|
| No. 24 Florida A&M * | 7 | – | 1 | 9 | – | 2 |
| No. 20 North Carolina A&T + | 6 | – | 2 | 9 | – | 3 |
| South Carolina State + | 6 | – | 2 | 8 | – | 3 |
| Bethune–Cookman | 5 | – | 3 | 7 | – | 4 |
| Norfolk State | 4 | – | 4 | 5 | – | 7 |
| North Carolina Central | 3 | – | 5 | 4 | – | 8 |
| Howard | 2 | – | 6 | 2 | – | 10 |
| Morgan State | 2 | – | 6 | 3 | – | 9 |
| Delaware State | 1 | – | 7 | 2 | – | 10 |
+ – Conference co-champions; * Florida A&M ineligible for conference title due to NCAA sanctions; Rankings from STATS Poll

2019 Missouri Valley Football Conference standings
| | Conf. | | | Overall |
| Team | W | | L | W | | L |
|---|---|---|---|---|---|---|
| No. 1 North Dakota State $^ | 8 | – | 0 | 16 | – | 0 |
| No. 5 Northern Iowa ^ | 6 | – | 2 | 10 | – | 5 |
| No. 7 Illinois State ^ | 5 | – | 3 | 10 | – | 5 |
| No. 10 South Dakota State ^ | 5 | – | 3 | 8 | – | 5 |
| Southern Illinois | 5 | – | 3 | 7 | – | 5 |
| South Dakota | 4 | – | 4 | 5 | – | 7 |
| Indiana State | 3 | – | 5 | 5 | – | 7 |
| Youngstown State | 2 | – | 6 | 6 | – | 6 |
| Missouri State | 1 | – | 7 | 1 | – | 10 |
| Western Illinois | 1 | – | 7 | 1 | – | 11 |
$ – Conference champion; ^ – FCS playoff participant; Rankings from STATS Poll

2019 Northeast Conference football standings
| | Conf. | | | Overall |
| Team | W | | L | W | | L |
|---|---|---|---|---|---|---|
| No. 23 Central Connecticut $^ | 7 | – | 0 | 11 | – | 1 |
| Robert Morris | 6 | – | 1 | 7 | – | 5 |
| Duquesne | 4 | – | 3 | 6 | – | 5 |
| Sacred Heart | 4 | – | 3 | 7 | – | 5 |
| Saint Francis (PA) | 3 | – | 4 | 6 | – | 6 |
| Bryant | 3 | – | 4 | 4 | – | 8 |
| Wagner | 1 | – | 6 | 1 | – | 11 |
| LIU | 0 | – | 7 | 0 | – | 10 |
| Merrimack * | 0 | – | 0 | 6 | – | 5 |
$ – Conference champion; ^ – FCS playoff participant; * – Merrimack ineligible for NEC title and FCS postseason play due to transition to NCAA Division I, and also ineligible for NEC title due to not playing a full conference schedule; Rankings from STATS Poll

2019 Ohio Valley Conference football standings
| | Conf. | | | Overall |
| Team | W | | L | W | | L |
|---|---|---|---|---|---|---|
| No. 8 Austin Peay +^ | 7 | – | 1 | 9 | – | 3 |
| No. 17 Southeast Missouri State +^ | 7 | – | 1 | 9 | – | 3 |
| UT Martin | 6 | – | 2 | 7 | – | 5 |
| Eastern Kentucky | 5 | – | 3 | 7 | – | 5 |
| Tennessee Tech | 3 | – | 5 | 6 | – | 6 |
| Jacksonville State | 3 | – | 5 | 6 | – | 6 |
| Murray State | 2 | – | 6 | 4 | – | 8 |
| Tennessee State | 2 | – | 6 | 3 | – | 9 |
| Eastern Illinois | 1 | – | 7 | 1 | – | 11 |
+ – Conference co-champions; ^ – FCS playoff participant; Rankings from STATS Poll

2019 Patriot League football standings
| | Conf. | | | Overall |
| Team | W | | L | W | | L |
|---|---|---|---|---|---|---|
| Holy Cross $^ | 5 | – | 1 | 7 | – | 5 |
| Lafayette | 4 | – | 2 | 4 | – | 8 |
| Bucknell | 3 | – | 3 | 3 | – | 8 |
| Lehigh | 3 | – | 3 | 4 | – | 7 |
| Colgate | 3 | – | 3 | 4 | – | 8 |
| Fordham | 2 | – | 4 | 4 | – | 8 |
| Georgetown | 1 | – | 5 | 5 | – | 6 |
$ – Conference champion; ^ – FCS playoff participant

2019 Pioneer Football League standings
| | Conf. | | | Overall |
| Team | W | | L | W | | L |
|---|---|---|---|---|---|---|
| San Diego $^ | 8 | – | 0 | 9 | – | 3 |
| Dayton | 6 | – | 2 | 8 | – | 3 |
| Drake | 6 | – | 2 | 6 | – | 5 |
| Davidson | 5 | – | 3 | 8 | – | 4 |
| Stetson | 4 | – | 4 | 7 | – | 4 |
| Marist | 4 | – | 4 | 4 | – | 7 |
| Morehead State | 3 | – | 5 | 5 | – | 7 |
| Butler | 2 | – | 6 | 3 | – | 9 |
| Jacksonville | 1 | – | 7 | 3 | – | 9 |
| Valparaiso | 1 | – | 7 | 1 | – | 11 |
$ – Conference champion; ^ – FCS playoff participant

2019 Southern Conference football standings
| | Conf. | | | Overall |
| Team | W | | L | W | | L |
|---|---|---|---|---|---|---|
| No. 16 Wofford $^ | 7 | – | 1 | 8 | – | 3 |
| No. 21 Furman ^ | 6 | – | 2 | 8 | – | 4 |
| Chattanooga | 5 | – | 3 | 6 | – | 6 |
| The Citadel | 4 | – | 4 | 6 | – | 6 |
| Samford | 4 | – | 4 | 5 | – | 7 |
| VMI | 4 | – | 4 | 5 | – | 7 |
| Mercer | 3 | – | 5 | 4 | – | 8 |
| Western Carolina | 2 | – | 6 | 3 | – | 9 |
| East Tennessee State | 1 | – | 7 | 3 | – | 9 |
$ – Conference champion; ^ – FCS playoff participant; Rankings from STATS Poll

2019 Southland Conference football standings
| | Conf. | | | Overall |
| Team | W | | L | W | | L |
|---|---|---|---|---|---|---|
| No. 14 Nicholls +^ | 7 | – | 2 | 8 | – | 4 |
| No. 11 Central Arkansas +^ | 7 | – | 2 | 9 | – | 3 |
| No. 19 Southeastern Louisiana ^ | 6 | – | 3 | 8 | – | 5 |
| Sam Houston State | 6 | – | 3 | 7 | – | 5 |
| McNeese State | 5 | – | 4 | 7 | – | 5 |
| Incarnate Word | 4 | – | 5 | 5 | – | 7 |
| Abilene Christian | 4 | – | 5 | 5 | – | 7 |
| Northwestern State | 3 | – | 6 | 3 | – | 9 |
| Stephen F. Austin | 3 | – | 6 | 3 | – | 9 |
| Houston Baptist | 2 | – | 6 | 5 | – | 7 |
| Lamar | 2 | – | 7 | 4 | – | 8 |
+ – Conference co-champions; ^ – FCS playoff participant; Rankings from STATS poll

2019 Southwestern Athletic Conference football standings
| | Conf. | | | Overall |
| Team | W | | L | W | | L |
|---|---|---|---|---|---|---|
East Division
| Alcorn State x$ | 6 | – | 1 | 9 | – | 4 |
| Alabama A&M | 4 | – | 3 | 7 | – | 5 |
| Alabama State | 4 | – | 3 | 5 | – | 6 |
| Jackson State | 3 | – | 4 | 4 | – | 8 |
| Mississippi Valley State | 1 | – | 6 | 2 | – | 9 |
West Division
| Southern x | 6 | – | 1 | 8 | – | 5 |
| Prairie View A&M | 4 | – | 3 | 6 | – | 5 |
| Grambling State | 4 | – | 3 | 6 | – | 5 |
| Arkansas–Pine Bluff | 3 | – | 4 | 6 | – | 5 |
| Texas Southern | 0 | – | 7 | 0 | – | 11 |
Championship: Alcorn State 39, Southern 24
$ – Conference champion; x – Division champion/co-champions

2019 NCAA Division I FCS independents football standings
| | Conf. | | | Overall |
| Team | W | | L | W | | L |
|---|---|---|---|---|---|---|
| North Dakota ^ | | – | | 7 | – | 5 |
^ – FCS playoff participant

== Playoff qualifiers ==
Champions of the following 10 conferences automatically received playoff bids:

- Big Sky (Weber State)
- Big South (Monmouth)
- Colonial Athletic Association (James Madison)
- Missouri Valley Football Conference (North Dakota State)
- Northeast Conference (Central Connecticut)
- Ohio Valley Conference (Austin Peay)
- Patriot League (Holy Cross)
- Pioneer Football League (San Diego)
- Southern Conference (Wofford)
- Southland Conference (Nicholls)

=== Abstentions ===
- Ivy League – Yale and Dartmouth (co-champions)
- Mid-Eastern Athletic Conference – North Carolina A&T
- Southwestern Athletic Conference – Alcorn State

== Postseason ==
A 24-team single-elimination tournament bracket culminated in the 2020 NCAA Division I Football Championship Game. Teams were announced in a selection show on November 24, with the top eight teams seeded and receiving first-round byes.

=== Bowl game ===
| Date | Visiting team | Home team | Site | Result | Attendance | Ref. |
|---|---|---|---|---|---|---|
| December 21 | Alcorn State | No. 23 North Carolina A&T | Mercedes-Benz Stadium • Atlanta, Georgia (Celebration Bowl) | 44–64 | 32,968 | |
^{#}Rankings from STATS poll released on November 24.

=== NCAA Division I playoff bracket ===
First Round; November 30; Campus sites
Nicholls | 24
North Dakota | 6
Southeast Missouri State | 6
Illinois State | 24
Austin Peay | 42
Furman | 6
Albany | 42
Central Connecticut | 14
Monmouth | 44
Holy Cross | 27
Northern Iowa | 17
San Diego | 3
Wofford | 21
Kennesaw State | 28
Southeastern Louisiana | 45
Villanova | 44

Second Round; December 7 Campus sites
1 | North Dakota State | 37
Nicholls | 13
8 | Central Arkansas | 14
Illinois State | 24
4 | Sacramento State | 28
Austin Peay | 42
5 | Montana State | 47
Albany | 21
2 | James Madison | 66
Monmouth | 21
7 | South Dakota State | 10
Northern Iowa | 13
3 | Weber State | 26
Kennesaw State | 20
6 | Montana | 73
Southeastern Louisiana | 28

Quarterfinals; December 13/14 (Note: North Dakota State vs. Illinois State on December 14; other games on December 13); Campus sites
1 | North Dakota State | 9
Illinois State | 3
Austin Peay | 10
5 | Montana State | 24
2 | James Madison | 17
Northern Iowa | 0
3 | Weber State | 17
6 | Montana | 10

Semifinals; December 21; Campus sites
1 | North Dakota State | 42
5 | Montana State | 14
2 | James Madison | 30
3 | Weber State | 14

National Championship
January 11 – Toyota Stadium
1 | North Dakota State | 28
2 | James Madison | 20

== Coaching changes ==
=== Preseason and in-season ===
This is restricted to coaching changes that took place on or after May 1, 2019. For coaching changes that occurred earlier in 2019, see 2018 NCAA Division I FCS end-of-season coaching changes.

| School | Outgoing coach | Date | Reason | Replacement |
|---|---|---|---|---|
| Howard | Ron Prince | November 6 | Placed on administrative leave† | Aaron Kelton (interim) |

† Prince was placed on administrative leave by the university, "after allegations of verbal abuse and intimidation of players."

=== End of season ===
| School | Outgoing coach | Date | Reason | Replacement |
|---|---|---|---|---|
| Gardner–Webb | Carroll McCray | November 24 | Fired | Tre Lamb |
| Mercer | Bobby Lamb | November 24 | Fired | Drew Cronic |
| Murray State | Mitch Stewart | November 24 | Reassigned within athletic department | Dean Hood |
| Northern Colorado | Earnest Collins Jr. | November 24 | Fired | Ed McCaffrey |
| Eastern Kentucky | Mark Elder | November 25 | Contract not renewed | Walt Wells |
| Lamar | Mike Schultz | November 25 | Fired | Blane Morgan |
| Cal Poly | Tim Walsh | November 25 | Retired | Beau Baldwin |
| Jacksonville | Ian Shields | December 3 | Program discontinued | None |
| Wagner | Jason Houghtaling | December 6 | Fired | Tom Masella |
| Howard | Ron Prince | December 6 | Resigned | Larry Scott |
| Missouri State | Dave Steckel | January 9 | Fired | Bobby Petrino |
| McNeese State | Sterlin Gilbert | January 12 | Became OC at Syracuse | Frank Wilson |
| Youngstown State | Bo Pelini | January 27 | Became DC at LSU | Doug Phillips |
| Arkansas Pine-Bluff | Cedric Thomas | February 17 | Became DB coach at Southern Miss | Doc Gamble |

== Attendances ==
Top 30 teams by average home attendance:

| # | Team | Home games | Total attendance | Average attendance |
|---|---|---|---|---|
| 1 | Jackson State Tigers | 5 | 168,808 | 33,762 |
| 2 | Montana Grizzlies | 7 | 157,812 | 22,545 |
| 3 | James Madison Dukes | 9 | 162,974 | 18,108 |
| 4 | Alabama State Hornets | 5 | 88,997 | 17,799 |
| 5 | North Dakota State Bison | 9 | 156,962 | 17,440 |
| 6 | Montana State Bobcats | 8 | 138,246 | 17,281 |
| 7 | Southern Jaguars | 4 | 67,826 | 16,957 |
| 8 | North Carolina A&T Aggies | 5 | 84,633 | 16,927 |
| 9 | Jacksonville State Gamecocks | 7 | 117,800 | 16,829 |
| 10 | Florida A&M Rattlers | 6 | 99,223 | 16,537 |
| 11 | Delaware Fightin' Blue Hens | 7 | 99,926 | 14,275 |
| 12 | Alcorn State Braves | 7 | 92,373 | 13,196 |
| 13 | Yale Bulldogs | 6 | 72,796 | 12,133 |
| 14 | Youngstown State Penguins | 7 | 84,150 | 12,021 |
| 15 | Norfolk State Spartans | 5 | 56,480 | 11,296 |
| 16 | South Dakota State Jackrabbits | 8 | 87,764 | 10,971 |
| 17 | Sacramento State Hornets | 7 | 76,651 | 10,950 |
| 18 | McNeese Cowboys | 6 | 65,266 | 10,878 |
| 19 | Harvard Crimson | 5 | 54,060 | 10,812 |
| 20 | Grambling State Tigers | 3 | 31,188 | 10,396 |
| 21 | South Carolina State Bulldogs | 6 | 62,035 | 10,339 |
| 22 | New Hampshire Wildcats | 5 | 50,527 | 10,105 |
| 23 | UC Davis Aggies | 5 | 47,502 | 9,500 |
| 24 | Mercer Bears | 6 | 56,437 | 9,406 |
| 25 | The Citadel Bulldogs | 6 | 56,066 | 9,344 |
| 26 | Illinois State Redbirds | 6 | 55,454 | 9,242 |
| 27 | Texas Southern Tigers | 4 | 36,814 | 9,204 |
| 28 | Western Carolina Catamounts | 6 | 52,814 | 8,802 |
| 29 | Tennessee State Tigers | 6 | 52,723 | 8,787 |
| 30 | William & Mary Tribe | 6 | 51,730 | 8,622 |

== See also ==
- 2019 NCAA Division I FCS football rankings
- 2019 NCAA Division I FBS football season
- 2019 NCAA Division II football season
- 2019 NCAA Division III football season
- 2019 NAIA football season
