= 2019 LIU Sharks football team =

Long Island University in the 2019 NCAA Division I FCS football season

2019 LIU Sharks football
- Conference: Northeast Conference
- Record: 0–10 (0–7 NEC)
- Head coach: Bryan Collins (22nd season)
- Offensive coordinator: Brian Hughes (23rd season)
- Defensive coordinator: Bryan Collins
- Home stadium: Bethpage Federal Credit Union Stadium

2019 Northeast Conference football standings
	Conf.			Overall
Team	W		L	W		L
No. 23 Central Connecticut $^	7	–	0	11	–	1
Robert Morris	6	–	1	7	–	5
Duquesne	4	–	3	6	–	5
Sacred Heart	4	–	3	7	–	5
Saint Francis (PA)	3	–	4	6	–	6
Bryant	3	–	4	4	–	8
Wagner	1	–	6	1	–	11
LIU	0	–	7	0	–	10
Merrimack *	0	–	0	6	–	5
$ – Conference champion; ^ – FCS playoff participant; * – Merrimack ineligible for NEC title and FCS postseason play due to transition to NCAA Division I, and also ineligible for NEC title due to not playing a full conference schedule; Rankings from STATS Poll

The 2019 LIU Sharks football team represented both the LIU Post and LIU Brooklyn campuses of Long Island University in the 2019 NCAA Division I FCS football season. They were led by 22nd- year head coach Bryan Collins and played their home games at Bethpage Federal Credit Union Stadium. They played as a first-year member of the Northeast Conference. This was the first season that the LIU Sharks were competing as a team following the merger of the two LIU campuses' athletic departments in the summer of 2019.

The Sharks finished winless in their first season. A month after the season ended, starting quarterback Clay Beathard was stabbed to death in Nashville, Tennessee.

== Schedule ==
Date	Time	Opponent	Site	TV	Result	Attendance
September 7	7:00 p.m.	at No. 3 South Dakota State*	Dana J. Dykhouse Stadium; Brookings, SD	ESPN3	L 3–38	10,153
September 21	1:00 p.m.	Sacred Heart	Bethpage Federal Credit Union Stadium; Brookville, NY	NEC Front Row	L 10–34	2,482
September 28	12:00 p.m.	at Wagner	Wagner College Stadium; Staten Island, NY	ESPN3	L 14–24	2,077
October 5	12:00 p.m.	at Duquesne	Arthur J. Rooney Athletic Field; Pittsburgh, PA	NEC Front Row	L 14–21	1,956
October 12	1:00 p.m.	at Bryant	Beirne Stadium; Smithfield, RI	ESPN3	L 22–27	1,268
October 19	1:00 p.m.	Saint Francis (PA)^{†}	Bethpage Federal Credit Union Stadium; Brookville, NY	NEC Front Row	L 0–30	4,178
October 26	12:00 p.m.	at No. 23 Central Connecticut	Arute Field; New Britain, CT	NEC Front Row	L 0–28	3,156
November 2	12:00 p.m.	at Robert Morris	Joe Walton Stadium; Moon Township, PA	NEC Front Row	L 17–28	934
November 15	7:00 p.m.	at No. 13 Villanova*	Villanova Stadium; Villanova, PA	FloSports	L 7–35	3,051
November 23	12:00 p.m.	Merrimack	Bethpage Federal Credit Union Stadium; Brookville, NY	NEC Front Row	L 10–24	855
*Non-conference game; ^{†}Homecoming; Rankings from STATS Poll released prior to the game; All times are in Eastern time

== Preseason ==
=== Preseason coaches' poll ===
The NEC released their preseason coaches' poll on July 24, 2019. The Sharks were picked to finish in 8th (last) place.

=== Preseason All–Northeast Conference team ===
The LIU Sharks were the only conference team to have no players selected for the 2019 All–Northeast Conference Football Preseason Team.

== Game summaries ==
=== At South Dakota State ===
	1	2	3	4	Total
Sharks	0	3	0	0	3
No. 3 Jackrabbits	7	14	14	3	38

=== Sacred Heart ===
	1	2	3	4	Total
Pioneers	6	13	8	7	34
Sharks	7	0	3	0	10

=== At Wagner ===
	1	2	3	4	Total
Sharks	0	7	7	0	14
Seahawks	7	17	0	0	24

=== At Duquesne ===
	1	2	3	4	Total
Sharks	0	0	7	7	14
Dukes	7	6	0	8	21

=== At Bryant ===
	1	2	3	4	Total
Sharks	0	10	0	12	22
Bulldogs	10	0	14	3	27

=== Saint Francis (PA) ===
	1	2	3	4	Total
Red Flash	3	6	0	21	30
Sharks	0	0	0	0	0

=== At Central Connecticut ===
	1	2	3	4	Total
Sharks	0	0	0	0	0
No. 23 Blue Devils	0	14	7	7	28

=== At Robert Morris ===
	1	2	3	4	Total
Sharks	3	14	0	0	17
Colonials	14	0	7	7	28

=== At Villanova ===
	1	2	3	4	Total
Sharks	0	7	0	0	7
No. 13 Wildcats	14	14	7	0	35

=== Merrimack ===
	1	2	3	4	Total
Warriors	10	7	0	7	24
Sharks	0	0	0	10	10
