= 1902 Villanova Wildcats football team =

American college football season

1902 Villanova Wildcats football
- Conference: Independent
- Record: 4–3
- Head coach: Richard Kelly & Timothy O'Rourke (1st season)
- Captain: Timothy O'Rourke
- Home stadium: None

1902 Eastern college football independents records
	Conf.			Overall
Team	W	L	T	W		L		T
Ursinus		–		9	–	0	–	0
Yale		–		11	–	0	–	1
Geneva		–		7	–	0	–	0
Harvard		–		11	–	1	–	0
Princeton		–		8	–	1	–	0
Army		–		6	–	1	–	1
Franklin & Marshall		–		7	–	2	–	0
Dartmouth		–		6	–	2	–	1
Holy Cross		–		6	–	2	–	1
Syracuse		–		6	–	2	–	1
Carlisle		–		8	–	3	–	0
Cornell		–		8	–	3	–	0
Lafayette		–		8	–	3	–	0
Amherst		–		7	–	3	–	0
Penn State		–		7	–	3	–	0
Penn		–		9	–	4	–	0
Lehigh		–		7	–	3	–	1
Vermont		–		5	–	3	–	2
Colgate		–		5	–	3	–	1
NYU		–		5	–	3	–	0
Bucknell		–		6	–	4	–	0
Washington & Jefferson		–		6	–	4	–	0
Columbia		–		6	–	4	–	1
Springfield Training School		–		3	–	2	–	1
Villanova		–		4	–	3	–	0
Brown		–		5	–	4	–	1
Swarthmore		–		6	–	6	–	0
Western U. of Penn.		–		5	–	6	–	1
New Hampshire		–		2	–	3	–	1
Buffalo		–		3	–	5	–	1
Tufts		–		4	–	6	–	1
Dickinson		–		4	–	6	–	0
Fordham		–		2	–	4	–	1
Wesleyan		–		3	–	6	–	1
Rutgers		–		3	–	7	–	0
Navy		–		2	–	7	–	1
Drexel		–		1	–	4	–	1
Temple		–		1	–	4	–	1
Pittsburgh College		–		1	–	6	–	0
Boston College		–		0	–	8	–	0

The 1902 Villanova Wildcats football team represented the Villanova University during the 1902 college football season. The team's captain was Timothy O'Rourke.

== Schedule ==
Date	Opponent	Site	Result	Source
October 11	at Penn State	Beaver Field; State College, PA	L 0–32	
October 15	at Fordham	New York, NY	W 15–6	
October 18	at Seton Hall	South Orange, NJ	W 22–11	
October 25	at Wilmington AA	Wilmington, DE	L 0–6	
November 1	at Bucknell	Lewisburg, PA	L 5–61	
November 13	Seton Hall	Villanova, PA	W 5–0	
November 15	at Wilmington AA	South Side Park; Wilmington, DE	W 17–12	
