= 2019 Saint Francis Red Flash football team =

American college football season

2019 Saint Francis Red Flash football
- Conference: Northeast Conference
- Record: 6–6 (5–4 NEC)
- Head coach: Chris Villarrial (10th season)
- Offensive coordinator: Marco Pecora (1st season as OC, 6th overall season)
- Defensive coordinator: Bishop Neal (1st season as DC, 4th overall season)
- Home stadium: DeGol Field

2019 Northeast Conference football standings
	Conf.			Overall
Team	W		L	W		L
No. 23 Central Connecticut $^	7	–	0	11	–	1
Robert Morris	6	–	1	7	–	5
Duquesne	4	–	3	6	–	5
Sacred Heart	4	–	3	7	–	5
Saint Francis (PA)	3	–	4	6	–	6
Bryant	3	–	4	4	–	8
Wagner	1	–	6	1	–	11
LIU	0	–	7	0	–	10
Merrimack *	0	–	0	6	–	5
$ – Conference champion; ^ – FCS playoff participant; * – Merrimack ineligible for NEC title and FCS postseason play due to transition to NCAA Division I, and also ineligible for NEC title due to not playing a full conference schedule; Rankings from STATS Poll

The 2019 Saint Francis Red Flash football team represented Saint Francis University in the 2019 NCAA Division I FCS football season. They were led by tenth-year head coach Chris Villarrial and played their home games at DeGol Field as a member of the Northeast Conference.

== Preseason ==
=== Preseason coaches' poll ===
The NEC released their preseason coaches' poll on July 24, 2019. The Red Flash were picked to finish in sixth place.

=== Preseason All-NEC team ===
The Red Flash had four players at four positions selected to the preseason all-NEC team.

Offense

Christian Eubanks – OL

Defense

Da'Jon Lee – LB

Nick Rinella – DB

Specialists

Nick Rinella – RS

== Schedule ==
Date	Time	Opponent	Site	TV	Result	Attendance
August 31	12:30 p.m.	at Lehigh*	Goodman Stadium; Bethlehem, PA	Stadium	W 14–13	4,161
September 7	6:00 p.m.	at No. 2 James Madison*	Bridgeforth Stadium; Harrisonburg, VA	NBCS WA	L 7–44	22,422
September 14	12:00 p.m.	Merrimack	DeGol Field; Loretto, PA	NEC Front Row	W 42–14	1,455
September 21	1:00 p.m.	Columbia*	DeGol Field; Loretto, PA	NEC Front Row	L 14–31	2,405
September 28	1:00 p.m.	at Bryant	Beirne Stadium; Smithfield, RI	NEC Front Row	W 16–6	2,894
October 12	12:00 p.m.	Robert Morris	DeGol Field; Loretto, PA	NEC Front Row	L 17–20	1,370
October 19	1:00 p.m.	at LIU	Bethpage Federal Credit Union Stadium; Brookville, NY	NEC Front Row	W 30–0	4,178
October 26	12:00 p.m.	Sacred Heart	DeGol Field; Loretto, PA	NEC Front Row	L 33–36 ^{OT}	1,045
November 2	12:00 p.m.	at Duquesne	Rooney Field; Pittsburgh, PA	NEC Front Row	L 21–30	1,297
November 9	12:00 p.m.	at No. 20 Central Connecticut	Arute Field; New Britain, CT	NEC Front Row	L 31–38 ^{OT}	
November 16	12:00 p.m.	Wagner	DeGol Field; Loretto, PA	NEC Front Row	W 42–8	
November 23	2:00 p.m.	at Delaware State*	Alumni Stadium; Dover, DE	ESPN3	W 35–21	527
*Non-conference game; Rankings from STATS Poll released prior to the game; All times are in Eastern time

== Game summaries ==
=== At Lehigh ===
	1	2	3	4	Total
Red Flash	0	0	7	7	14
Mountain Hawks	10	3	0	0	13

=== At James Madison ===
	1	2	3	4	Total
Red Flash	0	0	0	7	7
No. 2 Dukes	14	13	10	7	44

=== Merrimack ===
	1	2	3	4	Total
Warriors	7	7	0	0	14
Red Flash	7	13	15	7	42

=== Columbia ===
	1	2	3	4	Total
Lions	14	7	3	7	31
Red Flash	14	0	0	0	14

=== At Bryant ===
	1	2	3	4	Total
Red Flash	0	10	3	3	16
Bulldogs	6	0	0	0	6

=== Robert Morris ===
	1	2	3	4	OT	Total
Colonials	0	3	7	7	3	20
Red Flash	3	7	0	7	0	17

=== At LIU ===
	1	2	3	4	Total
Red Flash	3	6	0	21	30
Sharks	0	0	0	0	0

=== Sacred Heart ===
	1	2	3	4	OT	Total
Pioneers	3	7	6	14	6	36
Red Flash	10	10	3	7	3	33

=== At Duquesne ===
	1	2	3	4	Total
Red Flash	7	7	7	0	21
Dukes	7	13	10	0	30

=== At Central Connecticut ===
	1	2	3	4	OT	Total
Red Flash	0	14	10	7	0	31
No. 20 Blue Devils	7	7	7	10	7	38

=== Wagner ===
	1	2	3	4	Total
Seahawks	0	0	8	0	8
Red Flash	14	7	7	14	42

=== At Delaware State ===
	1	2	3	4	Total
Red Flash	14	14	7	0	35
Hornets	0	0	7	14	21
