= 2019 Duquesne Dukes football team =

American college football season

2019 Duquesne Dukes football
- Conference: Northeast Conference
- Record: 6–5 (4–3 NEC)
- Head coach: Jerry Schmitt (15th season)
- Offensive coordinator: Anthony Doria (4th season)
- Defensive coordinator: Dave Opfar (10th season)
- Home stadium: Arthur J. Rooney Athletic Field

2019 Northeast Conference football standings
	Conf.			Overall
Team	W		L	W		L
No. 23 Central Connecticut $^	7	–	0	11	–	1
Robert Morris	6	–	1	7	–	5
Duquesne	4	–	3	6	–	5
Sacred Heart	4	–	3	7	–	5
Saint Francis (PA)	3	–	4	6	–	6
Bryant	3	–	4	4	–	8
Wagner	1	–	6	1	–	11
LIU	0	–	7	0	–	10
Merrimack *	0	–	0	6	–	5
$ – Conference champion; ^ – FCS playoff participant; * – Merrimack ineligible for NEC title and FCS postseason play due to transition to NCAA Division I, and also ineligible for NEC title due to not playing a full conference schedule; Rankings from STATS Poll

The 2019 Duquesne Dukes football team represented Duquesne University as a member of the Northeast Conference (NEC) during the 2019 NCAA Division I FCS football season. They were led by 15th-year head coach Jerry Schmitt and played their home games at Arthur J. Rooney Athletic Field. Duquesne compiled an overall record of 6–5 with a mark of 4–3 in conference play, tying for third place in the NEC.

== Preseason ==
=== Preseason coaches' poll ===
The NEC released their preseason coaches' poll on July 24, 2019. The Dukes were picked to finish in first place.

=== Preseason All-NEC team ===
The Dukes had nine players at eight positions selected to the preseason all-NEC team.

Offense

Daniel Parr – QB

AJ Hines – RB

Kellon Taylor – WR

Gabe Spurlock – OL

Matt Womack – OL

Defense

Kam Carter – DL

Brett Zanotto – LB

Reid Harrison-Ducros – DB

Specialists

Mitch Maczura – K

== Schedule ==
Date	Time	Opponent	Site	TV	Result	Attendance
September 7	3:00 p.m.	Walsh*	Rooney Field; Pittsburgh, PA	NEC Front Row	W 44–3	2,257
September 14	2:00 p.m.	at Youngstown State*	Stambaugh Stadium; Youngstown, OH	ESPN+	L 14–34	15,991
September 21	1:00 p.m.	at Dayton*	Welcome Stadium; Dayton, OH	Facebook Live	W 35–31	4,917
September 28	1:00 p.m.	at New Hampshire*	Wildcat Stadium; Durham, NH	FloFootball	L 6–23	7,920
October 5	12:00 p.m.	LIU	Rooney Field; Pittsburgh, PA	NEC Front Row	W 21–14	1,956
October 19	12:00 p.m.	at Sacred Heart	Campus Field; Fairfield, CT	ESPN3	W 20–6	5,151
October 26	1:00 p.m.	Wagner	Rooney Field; Pittsburgh, PA	NEC Front Row	W 28–24	2,452
November 2	12:00 p.m.	Saint Francis (PA)	Rooney Field; Pittsburgh, PA	ESPN3	W 30–21	1,297
November 9	1:00 p.m.	at Robert Morris	Joe Walton Stadium; Moon Township, PA	NEC Front Row	L 21–41	2,321
November 16	1:00 p.m.	at Bryant	Beirne Stadium; Smithfield, RI	NEC Front Row	L 16–20	1,372
November 23	12:00 p.m.	No. 18 Central Connecticut	Rooney Field; Pittsburgh, PA	NEC Front Row	L 10–43	1,324
*Non-conference game; Rankings from STATS Poll released prior to the game; All times are in Eastern time

== Game summaries ==
=== Walsh ===
	1	2	3	4	Total
Cavaliers	0	0	3	0	3
Dukes	7	13	14	10	44

=== At Youngstown State ===
	1	2	3	4	Total
Dukes	0	7	0	7	14
Penguins	7	14	6	7	34

=== At Dayton ===
	1	2	3	4	Total
Dukes	14	7	7	7	35
Flyers	7	14	7	3	31

=== At New Hampshire ===
	1	2	3	4	Total
Dukes	0	0	0	6	6
Wildcats	10	3	3	7	23

=== LIU ===
	1	2	3	4	Total
Sharks	0	0	7	7	14
Dukes	7	6	0	8	21

=== At Sacred Heart ===
	1	2	3	4	Total
Dukes	3	14	0	3	20
Pioneers	0	0	6	0	6

=== Wagner ===
	1	2	3	4	Total
Seahawks	0	14	0	10	24
Dukes	0	14	7	7	28

=== Saint Francis ===
	1	2	3	4	Total
Red Flash	7	7	7	0	21
Dukes	7	13	10	0	30

=== At Robert Morris ===
	1	2	3	4	Total
Dukes	0	0	7	14	21
Colonials	7	13	7	14	41

=== At Bryant ===
	1	2	3	4	Total
Dukes	3	0	3	10	16
Bulldogs	3	9	8	0	20

=== Central Connecticut ===
	1	2	3	4	Total
No. 18 Blue Devils	12	7	17	7	43
Dukes	0	10	0	0	10

== Ranking movements ==
Ranking movements Legend: RV = Received votes
	Week													
Poll	Pre	1	2	3	4	5	6	7	8	9	10	11	12	Final
STATS FCS	RV													
Coaches	RV													
