= John J. Egan =

American football player, coach, and physician (1878–1949)

Biographical details
- Born: May 18, 1878; Waterbury, Connecticut, U.S.
- Died: February 1, 1949 (aged 70); Newington, Connecticut, U.S.

Playing career
- 1897–1901: Villanova

Coaching career (HC unless noted)
- 1900: Villanova (co-HC)
- 1901: Villanova

Head coaching record
- Overall: 7–5–2

John Joseph Egan (May 18, 1878 – February 1, 1949) was an American college football player and coach and physician. He served as the co-head football coach at Villanova College—now known as Villanova University—in 1900 with John Powers. Together they compiled a record of 5–2–2 in one season. Egan then coached Villanova the following year alone and compiled a 2–3 record, making his overall head coaching record 7–5–2. Later, he also served as athletic director at the University of Maryland.

Egan was a doctor by profession and practiced as a surgeon in his hometown of Waterbury, Connecticut for 38 years. He served as a major in the Medical Corps of the United States Army during World War II and was also a chief rating specialist at two Veterans' Administration offices in Connecticut. Egan died at a Connecticut veterans' hospital in 1949 after a long illness.

== Head coaching record ==
Year	Team	Overall	Conference	Standing	Bowl/playoffs
Villanova Wildcats (Independent) (1900–1901)
1900	Villanova	5–2–2			
1901	Villanova	2–3			
Villanova:		7–5–2			
Total:		7–5–2			
