= 1898 Villanova Wildcats football team =

American college football season

1898 Villanova Wildcats football
- Conference: Independent
- Record: 2–4–1
- Head coach: John F. Bagley (2nd season)
- Captain: John F. Bagley
- Home stadium: None

1898 Eastern college football independents records
| | Conf. | | | Overall |
| Team | W | L | T | W | | L | | T |
|---|---|---|---|---|---|---|---|---|
| Harvard | | – | | 11 | – | 0 | – | 0 |
| Drexel | | – | | 7 | – | 0 | – | 0 |
| Princeton | | – | | 11 | – | 0 | – | 1 |
| Penn | | – | | 12 | – | 1 | – | 0 |
| Buffalo | | – | | 8 | – | 1 | – | 0 |
| Cornell | | – | | 10 | – | 2 | – | 0 |
| Swarthmore | | – | | 9 | – | 2 | – | 0 |
| Washington & Jefferson | | – | | 9 | – | 2 | – | 0 |
| Yale | | – | | 9 | – | 2 | – | 0 |
| Dickinson | | – | | 8 | – | 2 | – | 0 |
| Syracuse | | – | | 8 | – | 2 | – | 1 |
| Wesleyan | | – | | 7 | – | 3 | – | 0 |
| Western Penn. | | – | | 5 | – | 2 | – | 1 |
| Brown | | – | | 6 | – | 4 | – | 0 |
| Carlisle | | – | | 6 | – | 4 | – | 0 |
| Penn State | | – | | 6 | – | 4 | – | 0 |
| Pittsburgh College | | – | | 6 | – | 4 | – | 1 |
| Army | | – | | 3 | – | 2 | – | 1 |
| Vermont | | – | | 3 | – | 2 | – | 1 |
| Holy Cross | | – | | 5 | – | 4 | – | 1 |
| Bucknell | | – | | 4 | – | 4 | – | 3 |
| Fordham | | – | | 1 | – | 1 | – | 2 |
| Franklin & Marshall | | – | | 4 | – | 4 | – | 2 |
| New Hampshire | | – | | 4 | – | 4 | – | 0 |
| Amherst | | – | | 4 | – | 5 | – | 1 |
| Villanova | | – | | 2 | – | 4 | – | 1 |
| Lehigh | | – | | 3 | – | 6 | – | 1 |
| Boston College | | – | | 2 | – | 5 | – | 1 |
| Colgate | | – | | 2 | – | 5 | – | 1 |
| Temple | | – | | 2 | – | 5 | – | 0 |
| Lafayette | | – | | 3 | – | 8 | – | 0 |
| NYU | | – | | 1 | – | 3 | – | 0 |
| Rutgers | | – | | 1 | – | 6 | – | 1 |
| Tufts | | – | | 1 | – | 9 | – | 0 |
| Geneva | | – | | 0 | – | 6 | – | 1 |

The 1898 Villanova Wildcats football team represented the Villanova University during the 1898 college football season. The team's captain was John F. Bagley.

== Schedule ==
| Date | Opponent | Site | Result | Source |
|---|---|---|---|---|
| October 1 | at Lafayette | Easton, PA | L 0–16 | |
| October 15 | Bryn Mawr A. A. | Villanova, PA | W 26–0 | |
| October 19 | Lawrenceville School | Villanova, PA | L 0–12 | |
| October 26 | at The Hill School | Pottstown, PA | T 0–0 | |
| October 29 | Manhattan College | Villanova, PA | W 16–5 | |
| November 2 | at Georgetown | Washington, DC | L 0–12 | |
| November 12 | at Manhattan College | Jasper Oval; New York, NY | L 0–5 | |
| November 24 | at Y. M. C. A. | Y. M. C. A. ground; York, PA | cancelled | |
