= 2019 Central Connecticut Blue Devils football team =

American college football season

2019 Central Connecticut Blue Devils football
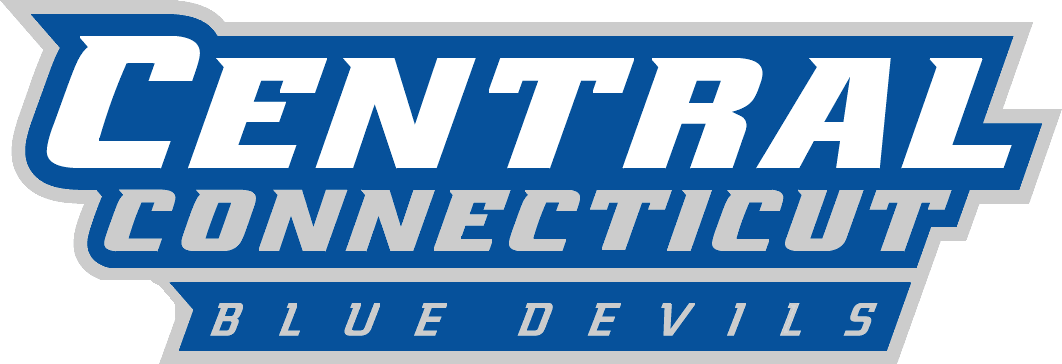

NEC champion

FCS Playoffs First Round, L 14–42 vs. Albany
- Conference: Northeast Conference

Ranking
- STATS: No. 23
- FCS Coaches: No. 22
- Record: 11–2 (7–0 NEC)
- Head coach: Ryan McCarthy (1st season)
- Offensive coordinator: Jeff Ambrosie (1st season)
- Defensive coordinator: Ron DiGravio (1st season)
- Home stadium: Arute Field

2019 Northeast Conference football standings
| | Conf. | | | Overall |
| Team | W | | L | W | | L |
|---|---|---|---|---|---|---|
| No. 23 Central Connecticut $^ | 7 | – | 0 | 11 | – | 1 |
| Robert Morris | 6 | – | 1 | 7 | – | 5 |
| Duquesne | 4 | – | 3 | 6 | – | 5 |
| Sacred Heart | 4 | – | 3 | 7 | – | 5 |
| Saint Francis (PA) | 3 | – | 4 | 6 | – | 6 |
| Bryant | 3 | – | 4 | 4 | – | 8 |
| Wagner | 1 | – | 6 | 1 | – | 11 |
| LIU | 0 | – | 7 | 0 | – | 10 |
| Merrimack * | 0 | – | 0 | 6 | – | 5 |
$ – Conference champion; ^ – FCS playoff participant; * – Merrimack ineligible for NEC title and FCS postseason play due to transition to NCAA Division I, and also ineligible for NEC title due to not playing a full conference schedule; Rankings from STATS Poll

The 2019 Central Connecticut Blue Devils football team represented Central Connecticut State University in the 2019 NCAA Division I FCS football season. They were led by first-year head coach Ryan McCarthy. They played their home games at Arute Field as a member of the Northeast Conference.

== Preseason ==
=== Preseason coaches' poll ===
The NEC released their preseason coaches' poll on July 24, 2019. The Blue Devils were picked to finish in third place.

=== Preseason All-NEC team ===
The Blue Devils had six players at three positions selected to the preseason all-NEC team.

Offense

Tyshaun James – WR

J'Von Brown – OL

Connor Mignone – OL

Cole Phelps – OL

Defense

Tajik Bagley – DB

DJ Exilhomme – DB

== Schedule ==
| Date | Time | Opponent | Rank | Site | TV | Result | Attendance |
|---|---|---|---|---|---|---|---|
| August 31 | 6:00 p.m. | at Fordham* | | Coffey Field; Bronx, NY | Stadium | W 26–23 | 2,988 |
| September 7 | 6:00 p.m. | Merrimack* | | Arute Field; New Britain, CT | NEC Front Row | W 40–37 | 5,114 |
| September 14 | 2:00 p.m. | at Valparaiso* | | Brown Field; Valparaiso, IN | ESPN+ | W 42–13 | 2,110 |
| September 21 | 3:00 p.m. | at Eastern Michigan* | | Rynearson Stadium; Ypsilanti, MI | ESPN3 | L 29–34 | 17,286 |
| October 5 | 2:00 p.m. | at Sacred Heart | | Campus Field; Fairfield, CT | ESPN3 | W 28–3 | 5,402 |
| October 12 | 1:00 p.m. | at Columbia* | | Robert K. Kraft Field at Lawrence A. Wien Stadium; New York, NY | ESPN+ | W 24–14 | 3,172 |
| October 19 | 1:00 p.m. | Bryant^{†} | No. 25 | Arute Field; New Britain, CT | NEC Front Row | W 52–14 | 5,114 |
| October 26 | 12:00 p.m. | LIU | No. 23 | Arute Field; New Britain, CT | NEC Front Row | W 28–0 | 3,156 |
| November 2 | 12:00 p.m. | at Wagner | No. 19 | Wagner College Stadium; New York City, NY | NEC Front Row | W 27–13 | 1,698 |
| November 9 | 12:00 p.m. | Saint Francis (PA) | No. 20 | Arute Field; New Britain, CT | NEC Front Row | W 38–31^{OT} | |
| November 16 | 12:00 p.m. | Robert Morris | No. 19 | Arute Field; New Britain, CT | NEC Front Row | W 49–28 | |
| November 23 | 12:00 p.m. | at Duquesne | No. 18 | Arthur J. Rooney Athletic Field; Pittsburgh, PA | NEC Front Row | W 43–10 | |
| November 30 | 12:00 p.m. | at No. 25 Albany* | No. 17 | Bob Ford Field at Tom & Mary Casey Stadium; Albany, NY (NCAA Division I First Round) | ESPN3 | L 14–42 | |
*Non-conference game; ^{†}Homecoming; Rankings from STATS Poll released prior to the game; All times are in Eastern time

== Game summaries ==
=== At Fordham ===
| | 1 | 2 | 3 | 4 | Total |
|---|---|---|---|---|---|
| Blue Devils | 8 | 7 | 0 | 11 | 26 |
| Rams | 0 | 6 | 10 | 7 | 23 |

=== Merrimack ===
| | 1 | 2 | 3 | 4 | Total |
|---|---|---|---|---|---|
| Warriors | 7 | 7 | 7 | 16 | 37 |
| Blue Devils | 3 | 21 | 13 | 3 | 40 |

=== At Valparaiso ===
| | 1 | 2 | 3 | 4 | Total |
|---|---|---|---|---|---|
| Blue Devils | 0 | 14 | 21 | 7 | 42 |
| Crusaders | 6 | 0 | 7 | 0 | 13 |

=== At Eastern Michigan ===
| | 1 | 2 | 3 | 4 | Total |
|---|---|---|---|---|---|
| Blue Devils | 15 | 0 | 0 | 14 | 29 |
| Eagles | 7 | 14 | 0 | 13 | 34 |

=== At Sacred Heart ===
| | 1 | 2 | 3 | 4 | Total |
|---|---|---|---|---|---|
| Blue Devils | 7 | 7 | 14 | 0 | 28 |
| Pioneers | 0 | 3 | 0 | 0 | 3 |

=== At Columbia ===
| | 1 | 2 | 3 | 4 | Total |
|---|---|---|---|---|---|
| Blue Devils | 7 | 10 | 0 | 7 | 24 |
| Lions | 0 | 7 | 7 | 0 | 14 |

=== Bryant ===
| | 1 | 2 | 3 | 4 | Total |
|---|---|---|---|---|---|
| Bulldogs | 0 | 14 | 0 | 0 | 14 |
| No. 25 Blue Devils | 14 | 14 | 14 | 10 | 52 |

=== LIU ===
| | 1 | 2 | 3 | 4 | Total |
|---|---|---|---|---|---|
| Sharks | 0 | 0 | 0 | 0 | 0 |
| No. 23 Blue Devils | 0 | 14 | 7 | 7 | 28 |

=== At Wagner ===
| | 1 | 2 | 3 | 4 | Total |
|---|---|---|---|---|---|
| No. 19 Blue Devils | 6 | 7 | 7 | 7 | 27 |
| Seahawks | 3 | 10 | 0 | 0 | 13 |

=== Saint Francis ===
| | 1 | 2 | 3 | 4 | OT | Total |
|---|---|---|---|---|---|---|
| Red Flash | 0 | 14 | 10 | 7 | 0 | 31 |
| No. 20 Blue Devils | 7 | 7 | 7 | 10 | 7 | 38 |

=== Robert Morris ===
| | 1 | 2 | 3 | 4 | Total |
|---|---|---|---|---|---|
| Colonials | 0 | 14 | 0 | 14 | 28 |
| No. 19 Blue Devils | 0 | 14 | 21 | 14 | 49 |

=== At Duquesne ===
| | 1 | 2 | 3 | 4 | Total |
|---|---|---|---|---|---|
| No. 18 Blue Devils | 12 | 7 | 17 | 7 | 43 |
| Dukes | 0 | 10 | 0 | 0 | 10 |

== FCS Playoffs ==
The Blue Devils received an automatic bid (due to winning their conference) for the postseason tournament, with a first-round pairing against Albany.

=== At Albany–First Round ===
| | 1 | 2 | 3 | 4 | Total |
|---|---|---|---|---|---|
| No. 17 Blue Devils | 7 | 0 | 0 | 7 | 14 |
| No. 25 Great Danes | 0 | 7 | 28 | 7 | 42 |

== Ranking movements ==
Ranking movements Legend: ██ Increase in ranking ██ Decrease in ranking — = Not ranked RV = Received votes
| | Week | | | | | | | | | | | | | |
| Poll | Pre | 1 | 2 | 3 | 4 | 5 | 6 | 7 | 8 | 9 | 10 | 11 | 12 | Final |
|---|---|---|---|---|---|---|---|---|---|---|---|---|---|---|
| STATS FCS | — | — | — | — | RV | RV | RV | 25 | 23 | 19 | 20 | 19 | 18 | |
| Coaches | — | RV | — | — | — | RV | RV | RV | 24 | 19 | 17 | 18 | 18 | |
