= 2019 Sacred Heart Pioneers football team =

American college football season

2019 Sacred Heart Pioneers football
- Conference: Northeast Conference
- Record: 7–5 (4–3 NEC)
- Head coach: Mark Nofri (8th season)
- Offensive coordinator: Matt Gardner (3rd season)
- Defensive coordinator: Michael Cooke (3rd season)
- Home stadium: Campus Field

2019 Northeast Conference football standings
	Conf.			Overall
Team	W		L	W		L
No. 23 Central Connecticut $^	7	–	0	11	–	1
Robert Morris	6	–	1	7	–	5
Duquesne	4	–	3	6	–	5
Sacred Heart	4	–	3	7	–	5
Saint Francis (PA)	3	–	4	6	–	6
Bryant	3	–	4	4	–	8
Wagner	1	–	6	1	–	11
LIU	0	–	7	0	–	10
Merrimack *	0	–	0	6	–	5
$ – Conference champion; ^ – FCS playoff participant; * – Merrimack ineligible for NEC title and FCS postseason play due to transition to NCAA Division I, and also ineligible for NEC title due to not playing a full conference schedule; Rankings from STATS Poll

The 2019 Sacred Heart Pioneers football team represented Sacred Heart University as a member of the Northeast Conference (NEC) during the 2019 NCAA Division I FCS football season. Led by eighth-year head coach Mark Nofri, the Pioneers compiled an overall record of 7–5 with a mark of 4–3 in conference play, tying for third place in the NEC. Sacred Heart played home games at Campus Field in Fairfield, Connecticut.

== Preseason ==
=== Preseason coaches' poll ===
The NEC released their preseason coaches' poll on July 24, 2019. The Pioneers were picked to finish in second place.

=== Preseason All-NEC team ===
The Pioneers had two players at two positions selected to the preseason all-NEC team.

Offense

Jordan Meachum – RB

Defense

Chris Agyemang – DL

== Schedule ==
Date	Time	Opponent	Site	TV	Result	Attendance
August 30	6:00 p.m.	at No. 7 Maine*	Alfond Stadium; Orono, ME	FloSports	L 14–42	7,478
September 7	6:00 p.m.	Bucknell*	Campus Field; Fairfield, CT	NEC Front Row	W 30–10	4,187
September 14	12:30 p.m.	at Lafayette*	Fisher Stadium; Easton, PA	Stadium	W 56–40	5,119
September 21	1:00 p.m.	at LIU	Bethpage Federal Credit Union Stadium; Brookville, NY	NEC Front Row	W 34–10	2,482
October 5	2:00 p.m.	Central Connecticut^{†}	Campus Field; Fairfield, CT	ESPN3	L 3–28	5,402
October 12	1:00 p.m.	at Penn*	Franklin Field; Philadelphia, PA	ESPN+	L 24–38	6,033
October 19	12:00 p.m.	Duquesne	Campus Field; Fairfield, CT	ESPN3	L 6–20	5,151
October 26	12:00 p.m.	at Saint Francis	DeGol Field; Loretto, PA	NEC Front Row	W 36–33^{OT}	1,045
November 2	1:00 p.m.	at Bryant	Beirne Stadium; Smithfield, RI	NEC Front Row	W 24–17	3,778
November 9	12:00 p.m.	Wagner	Campus Field; Fairfield, CT	NEC Front Row	W 41–7	
November 16	12:00 p.m.	Lehigh*	Campus Field; Fairfield, CT	NEC Front Row	W 13–6	
November 23	12:00 p.m.	at Robert Morris	Joe Walton Stadium; Moon Township, PA	NEC Front Row	L 14–16	
*Non-conference game; ^{†}Homecoming; Rankings from STATS Poll released prior to the game; All times are in Eastern time

== Game summaries ==
=== At No. 7 Maine ===
	1	2	3	4	Total
Pioneers	7	0	0	7	14
No. 7 Black Bears	21	21	0	0	42

=== Bucknell ===
	1	2	3	4	Total
Bison	0	3	7	0	10
Pioneers	0	23	0	7	30

=== At Lafayette ===
	1	2	3	4	Total
Pioneers	14	7	21	14	56
Leopards	3	21	3	13	40

=== At LIU ===
	1	2	3	4	Total
Pioneers	6	13	8	7	34
Sharks	7	0	3	0	10

=== Central Connecticut ===
	1	2	3	4	Total
Blue Devils	7	7	14	0	28
Pioneers	0	3	0	0	3

=== At Penn ===
	1	2	3	4	Total
Pioneers	0	10	7	7	24
Quakers	14	10	0	14	38

=== Duquesne ===
	1	2	3	4	Total
Dukes	3	14	0	3	20
Pioneers	0	0	6	0	6

=== At Saint Francis ===
	1	2	3	4	OT	Total
Pioneers	3	7	6	14	6	36
Red Flash	10	10	3	7	3	33

=== At Bryant ===
	1	2	3	4	Total
Pioneers	0	14	10	0	24
Bulldogs	0	14	0	3	17

=== Wagner ===
	1	2	3	4	Total
Seahawks	0	7	0	0	7
Pioneers	0	0	10	31	41

=== Lehigh ===
	1	2	3	4	Total
Mountain Hawks	0	3	3	0	6
Pioneers	0	0	0	13	13

=== At Robert Morris ===
	1	2	3	4	Total
Pioneers	7	0	7	0	14
Colonials	0	7	3	6	16

== Ranking movements ==
Ranking movements Legend: RV = Received votes
	Week													
Poll	Pre	1	2	3	4	5	6	7	8	9	10	11	12	Final
STATS FCS	RV													
Coaches														
