= 2019 Wagner Seahawks football team =

American college football season

2019 Wagner Seahawks football
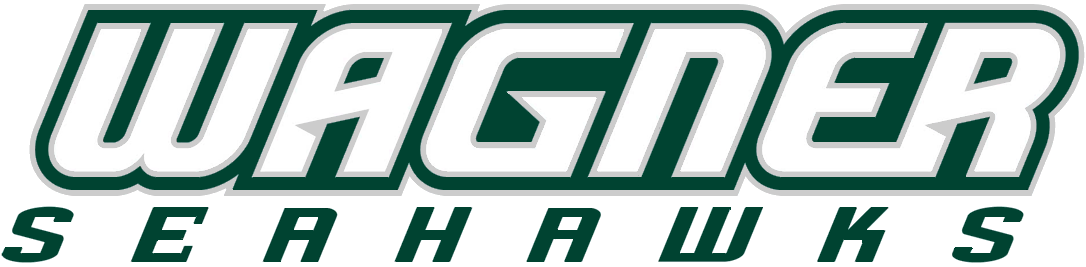
- Conference: Northeast Conference
- Record: 1–11 (1–6 NEC)
- Head coach: Jason Houghtaling (5th season)
- Offensive coordinator: Lee Hull (1st season)
- Defensive coordinator: Del Smith (1st season)
- Home stadium: Wagner College Stadium

2019 Northeast Conference football standings
	Conf.			Overall
Team	W		L	W		L
No. 23 Central Connecticut $^	7	–	0	11	–	1
Robert Morris	6	–	1	7	–	5
Duquesne	4	–	3	6	–	5
Sacred Heart	4	–	3	7	–	5
Saint Francis (PA)	3	–	4	6	–	6
Bryant	3	–	4	4	–	8
Wagner	1	–	6	1	–	11
LIU	0	–	7	0	–	10
Merrimack *	0	–	0	6	–	5
$ – Conference champion; ^ – FCS playoff participant; * – Merrimack ineligible for NEC title and FCS postseason play due to transition to NCAA Division I, and also ineligible for NEC title due to not playing a full conference schedule; Rankings from STATS Poll

The 2019 Wagner Seahawks football team represented Wagner College in the 2019 NCAA Division I FCS football season as a member of the Northeast Conference (NEC). They were led by fifth-year head coach Jason Houghtaling and played their home games at Wagner College Stadium. Wagner finished the season 1–11 overall and 1–6 in NEC play to place seventh. Houghtaling was fired after the season.

== Preseason ==
=== Preseason coaches' poll ===
The NEC released their preseason coaches' poll on July 24, 2019. The Seahawks were picked to finish in fourth place.

=== Preseason All-NEC team ===
The Seahawks had four players at three positions selected to the preseason all-NEC team.

Defense

- Chris Williams– DL
- Cam Gill – LB
- Santoni Graham – LB

Specialists

- Eric Silvester – P

== Schedule ==
Date	Time	Opponent	Site	TV	Result	Attendance
August 29	7:00 p.m.	at UConn*	Rentschler Field; East Hartford, CT	ESPN3	L 21–24	19,648
September 7	6:00 p.m.	East Stroudsburg*	Wagner College Stadium; Staten Island, NY	NEC Front Row	L 14–24	2,243
September 14	6:00 p.m.	at Stony Brook*	Kenneth P. LaValle Stadium; Stony Brook, NY	SNY	L 10–26	5,742
September 21	6:00 p.m.	at Florida Atlantic*	FAU Stadium; Boca Raton, FL	ESPN+	L 7–42	14,210
September 28	Noon	LIU	Wagner College Stadium; Staten Island, NY	NEC Front Row	W 24–14	2,077
October 5	6:00 p.m.	Monmouth*^{†}	Wagner College Stadium; Staten Island, NY	NEC Front Row	L 14–16	2,843
October 19	Noon	Robert Morris	Wagner College Stadium; Staten Island, NY	NEC Front Row	L 13–21	1,772
October 26	1:00 p.m.	at Duquesne	Arthur J. Rooney Athletic Field; Pittsburgh, PA	NEC Front Row	L 24–28	2,452
November 2	Noon	No. 19 Central Connecticut	Wagner College Stadium; Staten Island, NY	NEC Front Row	L 13–27	1,698
November 9	Noon	at Sacred Heart	Campus Field; Fairfield, CT	NEC Front Row	L 7–41	
November 16	Noon	at Saint Francis (PA)	DeGol Field; Loretto, PA	NEC Front Row	L 8–42	
November 23	Noon	Bryant	Wagner College Stadium; Staten Island, NY	NEC Front Row	L 10–14	
*Non-conference game; ^{†}Homecoming; Rankings from STATS Poll released prior to the game; All times are in Eastern time

== Game summaries ==
=== At UConn ===
	1	2	3	4	Total
Seahawks	0	0	14	7	21
Huskies	7	3	14	0	24

=== East Stroudsburg ===
	1	2	3	4	Total
Warriors	7	14	0	3	24
Seahawks	7	0	7	0	14

=== At Stony Brook ===
	1	2	3	4	Total
Seahawks	0	0	3	7	10
Seawolves	3	10	13	0	26

=== At Florida Atlantic ===
	1	2	3	4	Total
Seahawks	0	7	0	0	7
Owls	14	14	7	7	42

=== LIU ===
	1	2	3	4	Total
Sharks	0	7	7	0	14
Seahawks	7	17	0	0	24

=== Monmouth ===
	1	2	3	4	Total
Hawks	3	0	7	6	16
Seahawks	0	7	0	7	14

=== Robert Morris ===
	1	2	3	4	Total
Colonials	7	0	7	7	21
Seahawks	7	3	0	3	13

=== At Duquesne ===
	1	2	3	4	Total
Seahawks	0	14	0	10	24
Dukes	0	14	7	7	28

=== Central Connecticut ===
	1	2	3	4	Total
No. 19 Blue Devils	6	7	7	7	27
Seahawks	3	10	0	0	13

=== At Sacred Heart ===
	1	2	3	4	Total
Seahawks	0	7	0	0	7
Pioneers	0	0	10	31	41

=== At Saint Francis ===
	1	2	3	4	Total
Seahawks	0	0	8	0	8
Red Flash	14	7	7	14	42

=== Bryant ===
	1	2	3	4	Total
Bulldogs	0	0	7	7	14
Seahawks	7	3	0	0	10

== Ranking movements ==
Ranking movements Legend: RV = Received votes
	Week													
Poll	Pre	1	2	3	4	5	6	7	8	9	10	11	12	Final
STATS FCS	RV													
Coaches														
