= Thomas Reap =

American lawyer and college football coach

- Reap at Villanova in 1915

Biographical details
- Born: c. 1895
- Died: February 9, 1935 (aged 40); Scranton, Pennsylvania, U.S.

Playing career
- 1912–1915: Villanova
- Position: Tackle

Coaching career (HC unless noted)
- 1917–1920: Villanova
- 1921–?: Dickinson (line)

Head coaching record
- Overall: 9–13–4

Thomas M. Reap (c. 1895 – February 9, 1935) was an American lawyer and college football coach. He served as the head coach at Villanova College—now known as Villanova University—from 1917 to 1920, during which time he compiled a record of 9–13–4.

Reap attended Villanova College (now Villanova University), and from 1912 to 1915, played on the football team as a tackle. According to the 1915 edition of Spalding's Official Foot Ball Guide, he was one of "the main factors in Villanova's defense."

In 1917, Reap assumed the head coaching position at his alma mater, a post he held for four seasons. During his tenure, he amassed a 9–13–4 record. In 1921, he enrolled in the law school at Dickinson College, where he also served as the line coach for the football team.

In the late 1920s, he was practicing law in Montgomery County, Pennsylvania, and was a "prominent Philadelphia lawyer". Reap died in a Scranton, Pennsylvania, hospital while undergoing unspecified treatment on February 9, 1935, at the age of 40. His brother and former Villanova teammate, Jim Reap, served as a Lackawanna County sheriff.

== Head coaching record ==
Year	Team	Overall	Conference	Standing	Bowl/playoffs
Villanova Wildcats (Independent) (1917–1920)
1917	Villanova	0–3–2			
1918	Villanova	3–2			
1919	Villanova	5–3–1			
1920	Villanova	1–5–1			
Villanova:		9–13–4			
Total:		9–13–4			
