= Charles McGeehan =

American football player and sports coach (1878–1933)

Biographical details
- Born: 1878; Edinburgh, Scotland
- Died: May 30, 1933 (aged 55); Norristown, Pennsylvania, U.S.

Playing career

Football
- 1903–1906: Villanova

Coaching career (HC unless noted)

Football
- 1912: Villanova

Baseball
- 1912–1932: Villanova

Head coaching record
- Overall: 3–3 (football); 209–151–3 (baseball)

Charles A. McGeehan (1878 – May 30, 1933) was an American college football and college baseball coach. He served as the head football coach at Villanova College—now known as Villanova University—for one season, in 1912, tallying a mark of 3–3. McGeehan was also the head baseball coach at Villanova from 1912 to 1932, compiling a record of 209–151–3. McGeehan's brother, Hugh McGeehan, served as Villanova's head football coach in 1923.

== Head coaching record ==
=== Football ===
Year	Team	Overall	Conference	Standing	Bowl/playoffs
Villanova Wildcats (Independent) (1912)
1912	Villanova	3–3			
Villanova:		3–3			
Total:		3–3			
