= 1900 Villanova Wildcats football team =

American college football season

1900 Villanova Wildcats football
- Conference: Independent
- Record: 5–2–2
- Head coach: John J. Egan & John Powers (1st season)
- Captain: John Powers

1900 Eastern college football independents records
	Conf.			Overall
Team	W	L	T	W		L		T
Yale		–		12	–	0	–	0
Penn		–		12	–	1	–	0
Harvard		–		10	–	1	–	0
Cornell		–		10	–	2	–	0
Geneva		–		5	–	1	–	1
Lafayette		–		9	–	2	–	0
Syracuse		–		7	–	2	–	1
Princeton		–		8	–	3	–	0
Drexel		–		5	–	2	–	0
Fordham		–		3	–	1	–	1
Army		–		7	–	3	–	1
Brown		–		7	–	3	–	1
Columbia		–		7	–	3	–	1
Villanova		–		5	–	2	–	2
Washington & Jefferson		–		6	–	3	–	1
Swarthmore		–		6	–	3	–	2
Holy Cross		–		5	–	3	–	1
Carlisle		–		6	–	4	–	1
Buffalo		–		3	–	2	–	2
Western Univ. of Penn		–		5	–	4	–	0
Bucknell		–		4	–	4	–	1
Dickinson		–		5	–	5	–	0
Pittsburgh College		–		3	–	3	–	1
Rutgers		–		4	–	4	–	0
Vermont		–		4	–	4	–	1
Lehigh		–		5	–	6	–	0
Franklin & Marshall		–		4	–	5	–	0
Temple		–		3	–	4	–	1
Penn State		–		4	–	6	–	1
Amherst		–		4	–	7	–	1
Dartmouth		–		2	–	4	–	2
NYU		–		3	–	6	–	1
Tufts		–		3	–	6	–	1
Wesleyan		–		3	–	6	–	1
New Hampshire		–		1	–	5	–	1
Colgate		–		2	–	8	–	0
CCNY		–		0	–	1	–	0

The 1900 Villanova Wildcats football team represented the Villanova University during the 1900 college football season. The team's captain was John Powers.

== Schedule ==
Date	Opponent	Site	Result	Attendance	Source
	Penn B team	Villanova, PA	T 0–0		
October 13	Gettysburg	Villanova, PA	W 12–0		
October 20	Manhattan College	Villanova, PA	T 0–0 (Note: The Philadelphia Inquirer reported the score of 0–0 for the game on October 20 between Villanova and Manhattan College, while The New York Times reported a 2–0 win for Manhattan College. Villanova's records reflect a scoreless tie.)		
October 24	Medico-Chi	Villanova, PA	W 18–0		
October 27	at Manhattan College	Jasper Oval; New York, NY	L 5–6		
November 6	at Warren AA	Wilmington, DE	W 29–0	300	
November 24	Bucknell	Villanova, PA	T 0–0		
November 29	at Conshohocken AA	Conshohocken, PA	W 22–0	2,000	
December 8	at Conshohocken AA	Conshohocken, PA	W 6–0		
