= 2019 Bryant Bulldogs football team =

American college football season

2019 Bryant Bulldogs football
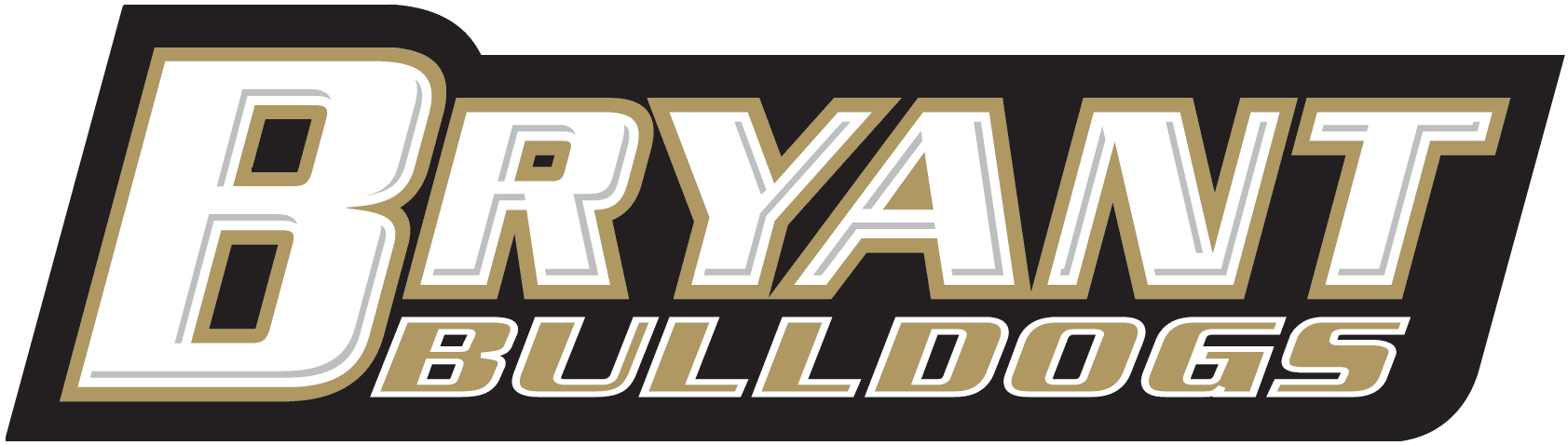
- Conference: Northeast Conference
- Record: 4–8 (3–4 NEC)
- Head coach: Chris Merritt (1st season)
- Offensive coordinator: Darrius G. Smith (1st season)
- Defensive coordinator: Tom Masella (1st season)
- Home stadium: Beirne Stadium

2019 Northeast Conference football standings
	Conf.			Overall
Team	W		L	W		L
No. 23 Central Connecticut $^	7	–	0	11	–	1
Robert Morris	6	–	1	7	–	5
Duquesne	4	–	3	6	–	5
Sacred Heart	4	–	3	7	–	5
Saint Francis (PA)	3	–	4	6	–	6
Bryant	3	–	4	4	–	8
Wagner	1	–	6	1	–	11
LIU	0	–	7	0	–	10
Merrimack *	0	–	0	6	–	5
$ – Conference champion; ^ – FCS playoff participant; * – Merrimack ineligible for NEC title and FCS postseason play due to transition to NCAA Division I, and also ineligible for NEC title due to not playing a full conference schedule; Rankings from STATS Poll

The 2019 Bryant Bulldogs football team represented Bryant University as a member of the Northeast Conference (NEC) during the 2019 NCAA Division I FCS football season. Led by first-year head coach Chris Merritt, the Bulldogs compiled an overall record of 4–8 with a mark of 3–4 in conference play, tying for fifth place in the NEC. Bryant played home games at Beirne Stadium in Smithfield, Rhode Island.

== Preseason ==
=== Preseason coaches' poll ===
The NEC released their preseason coaches' poll on July 24, 2019. The Bulldogs were picked to finish in fifth place.

=== Preseason All-NEC team ===
The Bulldogs had two players at two positions selected to the preseason all-NEC team.

Offense

Vincent Nisivoccia – WR

Defense

Tomas Wright – DL

== Schedule ==
Date	Time	Opponent	Site	TV	Result	Attendance
August 29	7:00 p.m.	at Stony Brook*	Kenneth P. LaValle Stadium; Stony Brook, NY	FloSports	L 10–35	9,652
September 7	7:00 p.m.	at Albany*	Bob Ford Field at Tom & Mary Casey Stadium; Albany, NY	FloSports	L 3–45	5,014
September 14	1:00 p.m.	Fordham*	Beirne Stadium; Smithfield, RI	NEC Front Row	L 14–29	1,362
September 21	2:00 p.m.	Brown*	Beirne Stadium; Smithfield, RI	NEC Front Row	L 30–35	2,242
September 28	1:00 p.m.	Saint Francis (PA)^{†}	Beirne Stadium; Smithfield, RI	NEC Front Row	L 6–16	2,894
October 5	1:00 p.m.	at Merrimack	Duane Stadium; North Andover, MA	NEC Front Row	W 24–17	10,172
October 12	1:00 p.m.	LIU	Beirne Stadium; Smithfield, RI	NEC Front Row	W 27–22	1,268
October 19	1:00 p.m.	at No. 25 Central Connecticut	Arute Field; New Britain, CT	NEC Front Row	L 14–52	5,114
October 26	Noon	at Robert Morris	Joe Walton Stadium; Moon Township, PA	NEC Front Row	L 20–24	1,496
November 2	1:00 p.m.	Sacred Heart	Beirne Stadium; Smithfield, RI	NEC Front Row	L 17–24	3,778
November 16	1:00 p.m.	Duquesne	Beirne Stadium; Smithfield, RI	NEC Front Row	W 20–16	1,372
November 23	Noon	at Wagner	Wagner College Stadium; Staten Island, NY	NEC Front Row	W 14–10	1,814
*Non-conference game; ^{†}Homecoming; Rankings from STATS Poll released prior to the game; All times are in Eastern time

== Game summaries ==
=== At Stony Brook ===
	1	2	3	4	Total
Bulldogs	0	3	0	7	10
Seawolves	7	7	15	6	35

=== At Albany ===
	1	2	3	4	Total
Bulldogs	0	0	0	3	3
Great Danes	7	21	7	10	45

=== Fordham ===
	1	2	3	4	Total
Rams	0	6	0	23	29
Bulldogs	7	0	7	0	14

=== Brown ===
	1	2	3	4	Total
Bears	0	14	7	14	35
Bulldogs	3	7	7	13	30

=== Saint Francis ===
	1	2	3	4	Total
Red Flash	0	10	3	3	16
Bulldogs	6	0	0	0	6

=== At Merrimack ===
	1	2	3	4	Total
Bulldogs	7	10	7	0	24
Warriors	7	7	3	0	17

=== LIU ===
	1	2	3	4	Total
Sharks	0	10	0	12	22
Bulldogs	10	0	14	3	27

=== At Central Connecticut ===
	1	2	3	4	Total
Bulldogs	0	14	0	0	14
No. 25 Blue Devils	14	14	14	10	52

=== At Robert Morris ===
	1	2	3	4	Total
Bulldogs	10	3	0	7	20
Colonials	0	0	17	7	24

=== Sacred Heart ===
	1	2	3	4	Total
Pioneers	0	14	10	0	24
Bulldogs	0	14	0	3	17

=== Duquesne ===
	1	2	3	4	Total
Dukes	3	0	3	10	16
Bulldogs	3	9	8	0	20

=== At Wagner ===
	1	2	3	4	Total
Bulldogs	0	0	7	7	14
Seahawks	7	3	0	0	10
