= Lou Ferry =

American football player and coach (1927–2004)

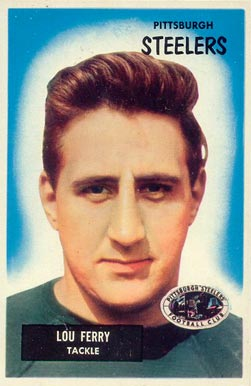
- Ferry on a 1955 Bowman football card

No. 18, 53, 82, 78
- Positions: Defensive tackle, tackle

Personal information
- Born: December 1, 1927; Chester, Pennsylvania, U.S.
- Died: January 25, 2004 (aged 76); Bryn Mawr, Pennsylvania, U.S.
- Listed height: 6 ft 2 in (1.88 m)
- Listed weight: 244 lb (111 kg)

Career information
- High school: St. James (Chester)
- College: Villanova
- NFL draft: 1949: 3rd round, 25th overall pick

Career history

Playing
- Green Bay Packers (1949); Bethlehem Bulldogs (1950); Erie Vets (1950); Chicago Cardinals (1951); Pittsburgh Steelers (1952–1955)

Coaching
- Villanova (1960–1969) Defensive line; Villanova (1970–1973) Head coach; Villanova (1974) Defensive line, interim head coach; Villanova (1975–1981, 1986–2003) Defensive line

Career NFL statistics
- Games played: 71
- Games started: 51
- Fumble recoveries: 7
- Total touchdowns: 1
- Stats at Pro Football Reference

Head coaching record
- Regular season: 20–26–1 (.436)

Louis A. Ferry (December 1, 1927 – January 25, 2004) was an American professional football player and coach. He played professionally in the National Football League (NFL) for the Green Bay Packers for two seasons (1949–1950), one season with the Chicago Cardinals (1951), and five with the Pittsburgh Steelers (1952–1956). Ferry served as the head football coach at Villanova University from 1970 to 1973 and interim head coach for the final three games of the 1974 season, compiling a record of 20–26–1.

Ferry died on January 25, 2004, at Mercy Fitzgerald Hospital in Darby, Pennsylvania.

== Head coaching record ==
Year	Team	Overall	Conference	Standing	Bowl/playoffs
Villanova Wildcats (NCAA University Division / Division I independent) (1970–1973)
1970	Villanova	9–2			
1971	Villanova	6–4–1			
1972	Villanova	2–9			
1973	Villanova	3–8			
Villanova Wildcats (NCAA Division I independent) (1974)
1974	Villanova	0–3 (Note: Jim Weaver served as Villanova's head coach for the first eight games of the 1974 season before he was fired. Ferry took over as interim head coach for the final three games. Villanova finished with an overall record of 3–8.)			
Villanova:		20–26–1			
Total:		20–26–1			
