= John F. Bagley =

Playing career
- 1896–1899: Villanova

Coaching career (HC unless noted)
- 1897–1898: Villanova

Head coaching record
- Overall: 5–9–2

John F. Bagley was an American college football player and coach. He served as the head football coach at Villanova College—now known as Villanova University—from 1897 to 1898, compiling a record of 5–9–2.

== Head coaching record ==
Year	Team	Overall	Conference	Standing	Bowl/playoffs
Villanova Wildcats (Independent) (1897–1898)
1897	Villanova	3–5–1			
1898	Villanova	2–4–1			
Villanova:		5–9–2			
Total:		5–9–2			
