= Kevin Davidson =

American football player (born 1997)

No. 9
- Position: Quarterback

Personal information
- Born: August 1, 1997 (age 29)
- Listed height: 6 ft 4 in (1.93 m)
- Listed weight: 225 lb (102 kg)

Career information
- High school: San Ramon Valley (Danville, California)
- College: Princeton
- NFL draft: 2020: undrafted

Career history
- Cleveland Browns (2020)*
- * Offseason or practice squad member only

Kevin Davidson (born August 1, 1997) is an American former college football player who was a quarterback for the Princeton Tigers.

== Early life ==
Davidson went to San Ramon Valley High School and was a three star recruit coming out of high school. In July 2015, Davidson committed to play football at University of California Davis. Davidson later uncommitted and on February 3, 2016, committed to play football for Princeton University.

== College career ==
Davidson saw little playing time at Princeton until he earned the starting quarterback job his senior season. On September 28, 2019, Davidson set an Ivy League record for touchdown passes in a game after throwing seven touchdowns against Bucknell. Davidson played in the 2020 East-West Shrine Bowl on January 18, 2020.

=== Statistics ===
Year	Team	Passing						
Year	Team	G	Cmp	Att	Pct	Yards	TD	INT
2016	Princeton	2	0	1	0.0	0	0	0
2017	Princeton	8	4	10	40.0	38	0	0
2018	Princeton	9	33	50	66.0	386	5	0
2019	Princeton	10	209	313	66.8	2,569	20	6
Career		29	246	374	65.8	2,993	25	6

== Professional career ==
Pre-draft measurables
Height	Weight	Arm length	Hand span	Wingspan	40-yard dash	10-yard split	20-yard split	20-yard shuttle	Three-cone drill	Vertical jump	Broad jump
6 ft 4 1/8 in (1.93 m)	224 lb (102 kg)	30 7/8 in (0.78 m)	8 1/4 in (0.21 m)	6 ft 3 in (1.91 m)	5.00 s	1.66 s	2.89 s	4.37 s	7.13 s	28.0 in (0.71 m)	9 ft 1 in (2.77 m)
All values from NFL Combine

After going undrafted in the 2020 NFL draft, Davidson signed with the Cleveland Browns as an undrafted free agent on May 5, 2020. He was waived by the Browns on September 5.

== Personal life ==
Davidson is the son of Rob and Jennifer Davidson. He has an older brother, Kurt, and a younger brother, Kyle.

Davidson has worked at private equity firm Parthenon Capital since 2023.
