= 2019 Bucknell Bison football team =

American college football season

2019 Bucknell Bison football
- Conference: Patriot League
- Record: 3–8 (3–3 Patriot)
- Head coach: Dave Cecchini (1st season)
- Offensive coordinator: Jason Miran (1st season)
- Defensive coordinator: Ryan Manalac (1st season)
- Home stadium: Christy Mathewson–Memorial Stadium

Uniform
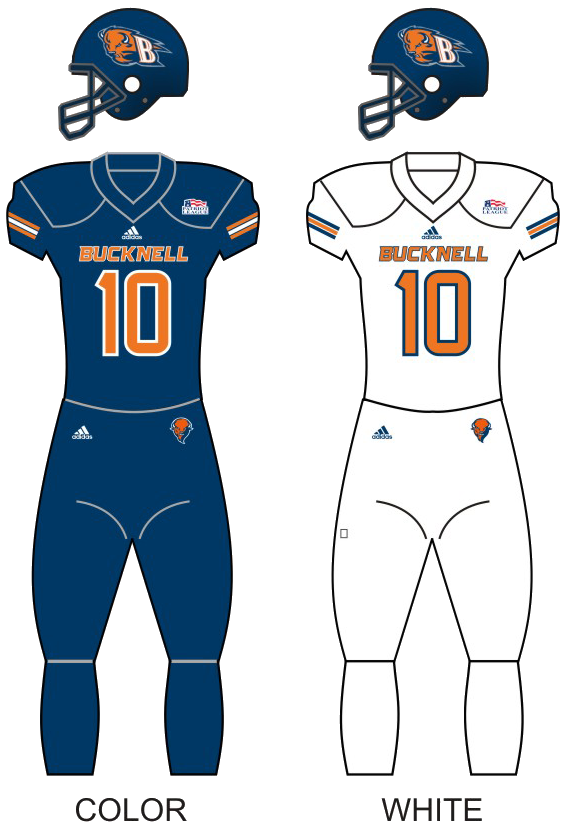

2019 Patriot League football standings
	Conf.			Overall
Team	W		L	W		L
Holy Cross $^	5	–	1	7	–	5
Lafayette	4	–	2	4	–	8
Bucknell	3	–	3	3	–	8
Lehigh	3	–	3	4	–	7
Colgate	3	–	3	4	–	8
Fordham	2	–	4	4	–	8
Georgetown	1	–	5	5	–	6
$ – Conference champion; ^ – FCS playoff participant

The 2019 Bucknell Bison football team represented Bucknell University in the 2019 NCAA Division I FCS football season. They were led by first-year head coach Dave Cecchini and played their home games at Christy Mathewson–Memorial Stadium. They played as a member of the Patriot League.

== Preseason ==
=== Preseason coaches' poll ===
The Patriot League released their preseason coaches' poll on July 30, 2019 (voting was by conference head coaches and sports information directors). The Bison were picked to finish in seventh (last) place.

=== Preseason All-Patriot League team ===
The Bison had two players selected to the preseason All-Patriot League team.

Defense

Simeon Page – LB

Special teams

Alex Pechin – P

== Schedule ==
Date	Time	Opponent	Site	TV	Result	Attendance
August 31	3:00 p.m.	at Temple*	Lincoln Financial Field; Philadelphia, PA	ESPN3	L 12–56	26,378
September 7	6:00 p.m.	at Sacred Heart*	Campus Field; Fairfield, CT	NEC Front Row	L 10–30	4,187
September 14	6:00 p.m.	No. 22 Villanova*	Christy Mathewson–Memorial Stadium; Lewisburg, PA	Stadium	L 10–45	3,649
September 28	3:30 p.m.	Princeton*	Christy Mathewson–Memorial Stadium; Lewisburg, PA	Stadium	L 23–56	3,795
October 5	2:00 p.m.	Holy Cross^{†}	Christy Mathewson–Memorial Stadium; Lewisburg, PA	Stadium	L 14–21	2,693
October 12	1:00 p.m.	at Colgate	Crown Field at Andy Kerr Stadium; Hamilton, NY	Stadium	W 32–14	2,386
October 19	4:00 p.m.	at No. 18 Towson*	Johnny Unitas Stadium; Towson, MD	FloSports	L 7–56	6,114
October 26	3:30 p.m.	at Lafayette	Fisher Stadium; Easton, PA	Stadium	L 17–21	5,325
November 9	1:00 p.m.	Lehigh	Christy Mathewson–Memorial Stadium; Lewisburg, PA	Stadium	W 20–10	2,051
November 16	1:00 p.m.	Georgetown	Christy Mathewson–Memorial Stadium; Lewisburg, PA	Stadium	W 20–17	
November 23	1:00 p.m.	at Fordham	Coffey Field; Bronx, NY	Stadium	L 14–31	
*Non-conference game; ^{†}Homecoming; Rankings from STATS Poll released prior to the game; All times are in Eastern time

== Game summaries ==
=== At Temple ===
	1	2	3	4	Total
Bison	0	9	3	0	12
Owls	21	14	7	14	56

=== At Sacred Heart ===
	1	2	3	4	Total
Bison	0	3	7	0	10
Pioneers	0	23	0	7	30

=== Villanova ===
	1	2	3	4	Total
No. 22 Wildcats	14	14	14	3	45
Bison	0	0	3	7	10

=== Princeton ===
	1	2	3	4	Total
Tigers	7	21	14	14	56
Bison	7	7	3	6	23

=== Holy Cross ===
	1	2	3	4	Total
Crusaders	0	14	7	0	21
Bison	0	14	0	0	14

=== At Colgate ===
	1	2	3	4	Total
Bison	14	6	6	6	32
Raiders	7	0	7	0	14

=== At Towson ===
	1	2	3	4	Total
Bison	0	7	0	0	7
No. 18 Tigers	21	21	14	0	56

=== At Lafayette ===
	1	2	3	4	Total
Bison	7	7	3	0	17
Leopards	7	0	0	14	21

=== Lehigh ===
	1	2	3	4	Total
Mountain Hawks	0	3	0	7	10
Bison	0	10	7	3	20

=== Georgetown ===
	1	2	3	4	Total
Hoyas	7	3	7	0	17
Bison	6	0	0	14	20

=== At Fordham ===
	1	2	3	4	Total
Bison	0	14	0	0	14
Rams	7	3	7	14	31
