= 2019 Colgate Raiders football team =

American college football season

2019 Colgate Raiders football
- Conference: Patriot League
- Record: 4–8 (3–3 Patriot)
- Head coach: Dan Hunt (6th season)
- Offensive coordinator: Open
- Defensive coordinator: Paul Shaffner (7th season)
- Home stadium: Crown Field at Andy Kerr Stadium

Uniform
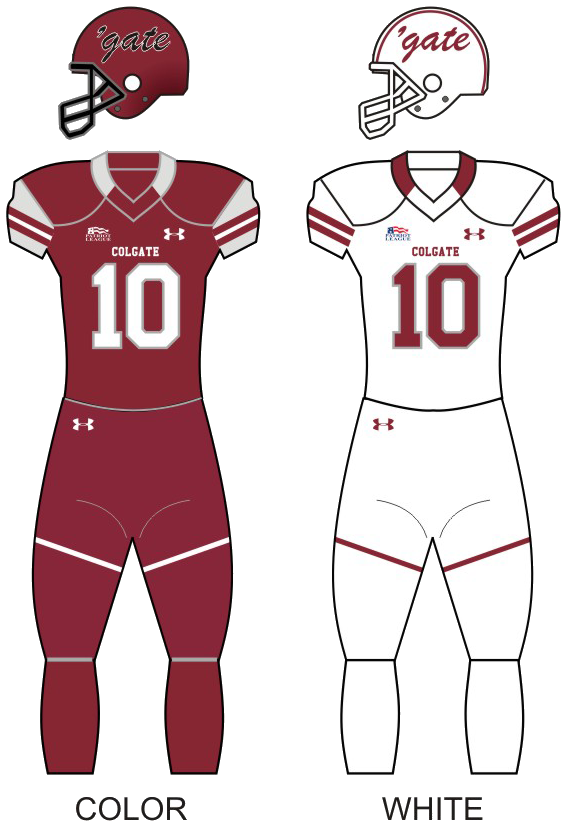

2019 Patriot League football standings
	Conf.			Overall
Team	W		L	W		L
Holy Cross $^	5	–	1	7	–	5
Lafayette	4	–	2	4	–	8
Bucknell	3	–	3	3	–	8
Lehigh	3	–	3	4	–	7
Colgate	3	–	3	4	–	8
Fordham	2	–	4	4	–	8
Georgetown	1	–	5	5	–	6
$ – Conference champion; ^ – FCS playoff participant

The 2019 Colgate Raiders football team represented Colgate University in the 2019 NCAA Division I FCS football season. They were led by sixth-year head coach Dan Hunt and played their home games at Crown Field at Andy Kerr Stadium. They were a member of the Patriot League.

== Preseason ==
=== Award watch lists ===
Listed in the order that they were released.

Award	Player	Position	Year
Walter Payton Award	Grant Breneman	QB	JR
Buck Buchanan Award	Abu Daramy–Swaray	CB	SR
Buck Buchanan Award	Nick Wheeler	DE	SR

=== Preseason coaches' poll ===
The Patriot League released their preseason coaches' poll on July 30, 2019 (voting was by conference head coaches and sports information directors). The Raiders were picked to finish in first place, receiving 12 of 14 first-place votes.

=== Preseason All-Patriot League team ===
The Raiders led the conference in selections, having ten players picked to the preseason All-Patriot League team. Additionally, Quarterback Grant Breneman was selected as the 2019 Patriot League Preseason Offensive Player of the Year and Defensive Lineman Nick Wheeler was selected as the 2019 Patriot League Preseason Defensive Player of the Year.

Offense

Grant Breneman – QB

Alex Mathews – RB

Nick Diaco – TE

Jack Badovinac – OL

Jovaun Woolford – OL

Defense

Nick Wheeler – DL

Nick Ioanilli – LB

Abu Daramy–Swaray – DB

Special teams

Chris Puzzi – PK

Abu Daramy–Swaray – RS

== Schedule ==
Date	Time	Opponent	Rank	Site	TV	Result	Attendance
August 24	12:00 p.m.	Villanova*	No. 13	Crown Field at Andy Kerr Stadium; Hamilton, NY	CBSSN	L 14–34	4,519
August 31	3:30 p.m.	at Air Force*	No. 13	Falcon Stadium; Colorado Springs, CO	ESPN3	L 7–48	33,101
September 14	6:00 p.m.	at William & Mary*		Zable Stadium; Williamsburg, VA	FloSports	L 10–38	6,777
September 21	12:00 p.m.	No. 12 Maine*		Crown Field at Andy Kerr Stadium; Hamilton, NY	Stadium	L 21–35	5,606
September 28	6:00 p.m.	at Dartmouth*		Memorial Field; Hanover, NH	ESPN+	L 3–38	6,122
October 5	1:00 p.m.	Lehigh^{†}		Crown Field at Andy Kerr Stadium; Hamilton, NY	Stadium	L 14–21	3,838
October 12	1:00 p.m.	Bucknell		Crown Field at Andy Kerr Stadium; Hamilton, NY	Stadium	L 14–32	2,386
October 19	1:30 p.m.	at Cornell*		Schoellkopf Field; Ithaca, NY (rivalry)	ESPN+	W 21–20	2,970
October 26	1:00 p.m.	at Holy Cross		Fitton Field; Worcester, MA	Stadium	L 10–31	10,926
November 2	12:00 p.m.	at Georgetown		Cooper Field; Washington, DC	Stadium	W 24–14	1,914
November 9	1:00 p.m.	Fordham		Crown Field at Andy Kerr Stadium; Hamilton, NY	Stadium	W 24–13	1,406
November 16	12:30 p.m.	at Lafayette		Fisher Stadium; Easton, PA	Stadium	W 16–0	
*Non-conference game; ^{†}Homecoming; Rankings from STATS Poll released prior to the game; All times are in Eastern time

== Game summaries ==
=== Villanova ===
	1	2	3	4	Total
Wildcats	0	27	0	7	34
No. 13 Raiders	0	0	7	7	14

Scoring summary

Quarter	Time	Drive			Team	Scoring information	Score	
Quarter	Time	Plays	Yards	TOP	Team	Scoring information	NOVA	COLG
2	14:20	6	62	1:51	NOVA	Jalen Jackson 18-yard touchdown reception from Daniel Smith, Drew Kresge kick good	7	0
2	13:16				NOVA	Interception returned 27 yards for touchdown by Jaquan Amos, Drew Kresge kick good	14	0
2	2:07	8	91	4:26	NOVA	Changa Hodge 45-yard touchdown reception from Daniel Smith, Drew Kresge kick missed	20	0
2	0:12	6	61	0:43	NOVA	Andrew Perez 15-yard touchdown reception from Daniel Smith, Drew Kresge kick good	27	0
3	6:27	12	68	5:41	COLG	Nick Draught 10-yard touchdown reception from Grant Breneman, Chris Puzzi kick good	27	7
4	13:26	8	77	3:05	COLG	Grant Breneman 1-yard touchdown run, Chris Puzzi kick good	27	14
4	8:41	10	78	4:40	NOVA	Daniel Smith 9-yard touchdown run, Drew Kresge kick good	34	14
"TOP" = time of possession. For other American football terms, see Glossary of American football.							34	14

=== At Air Force ===
	1	2	3	4	Total
No. 13 Raiders	0	0	7	0	7
Falcons	7	28	13	0	48

=== At William & Mary ===
	1	2	3	4	Total
Raiders	0	7	3	0	10
Tribe	17	0	7	14	38

=== Maine ===
	1	2	3	4	Total
No. 12 Black Bears	7	14	14	0	35
Raiders	0	7	7	7	21

=== At Dartmouth ===
	1	2	3	4	Total
Raiders	0	0	3	0	3
Big Green	14	10	7	7	38

=== Lehigh ===
	1	2	3	4	Total
Mountain Hawks	0	14	0	7	21
Raiders	7	7	0	0	14

=== Bucknell ===
	1	2	3	4	Total
Bison	14	6	6	6	32
Raiders	7	0	7	0	14

=== At Cornell ===
	1	2	3	4	Total
Raiders	0	14	7	0	21
Big Red	3	7	7	3	20

=== At Holy Cross ===
	1	2	3	4	Total
Raiders	0	3	0	7	10
Crusaders	7	14	10	0	31

=== At Georgetown ===
	1	2	3	4	Total
Raiders	0	7	10	7	24
Hoyas	0	7	0	7	14

=== Fordham ===
	1	2	3	4	Total
Rams	3	7	3	0	13
Raiders	7	7	7	3	24

=== At Lafayette ===
	1	2	3	4	Total
Raiders	6	0	7	3	16
Leopards	0	0	0	0	0

== Rankings ==
Ranking movements Legend: ██ Increase in ranking ██ Decrease in ranking — = Not ranked RV = Received votes
	Week													
Poll	Pre	1	2	3	4	5	6	7	8	9	10	11	12	Final
STATS FCS	13	RV	RV	—	—	—	—	—	—	—				
Coaches	14	24	RV	—	—	—	—	—	—	—				
