= 2019 Columbia Lions football team =

American college football season

2019 Columbia Lions football
- Conference: Ivy League
- Record: 3–7 (2–5 Ivy)
- Head coach: Al Bagnoli (5th season)
- Home stadium: Robert K. Kraft Field at Lawrence A. Wien Stadium

2019 Ivy League football standings
	Conf.			Overall
Team	W		L	W		L
No. 22 Dartmouth +	6	–	1	9	–	1
No. 25 Yale +	6	–	1	9	–	1
Princeton	5	–	2	8	–	2
Penn	3	–	4	5	–	5
Cornell	3	–	4	4	–	6
Harvard	2	–	5	4	–	6
Columbia	2	–	5	3	–	7
Brown	1	–	6	2	–	8
+ – Conference co-champions; Rankings from STATS Poll

The 2019 Columbia Lions football team represented Columbia University in the 2019 NCAA Division I FCS football season as a member of the Ivy League. They were led by fifth-year head coach Al Bagnoli and played their home games at Robert K. Kraft Field at Lawrence A. Wien Stadium. They finished the season 3–7, 2–5 in Ivy League play to finish in a tie for sixth place. Columbia averaged 5,376 fans per game

== Preseason ==
=== Preseason media poll ===
The Ivy League released their preseason media poll on August 8, 2019. The Lions were picked to finish in sixth place.

== Schedule ==
Date	Time	Opponent	Site	TV	Result	Attendance
September 21	1:00 p.m.	at Saint Francis (PA)*	DeGol Field; Loretto, PA	NEC Front Row	W 31–14	2,405
September 28	1:00 p.m.	Georgetown*	Robert K. Kraft Field at Lawrence A. Wien Stadium; New York, NY	ESPN+	L 10–24	4,311
October 5	1:00 p.m.	at No. 25 Princeton	Powers Field at Princeton Stadium; Princeton, NJ	ESPN+	L 10–21	5,225
October 12	1:00 p.m.	Central Connecticut*	Robert K. Kraft Field at Lawrence A. Wien Stadium; New York, NY	ESPN+	L 14–24	3,172
October 19	1:30 p.m.	Penn^{†}	Robert K. Kraft Field at Lawrence A. Wien Stadium; New York, NY	ESPN+/SNY	W 44–6	10,452
October 25	6:00 p.m.	at No. 17 Dartmouth	Memorial Field; Hanover, NH	ESPNU	L 24–59	4,221
November 2	12:00 p.m.	at Yale	Yale Bowl; New Haven, CT	ESPN+	L 10–45	5,667
November 9	1:00 p.m.	Harvard	Robert K. Kraft Field at Lawrence A. Wien Stadium; New York, NY	ESPN+/SNY	W 17–10 ^{OT}	4,739
November 16	1:00 p.m.	Brown	Robert K. Kraft Field at Lawrence A. Wien Stadium; New York, NY	ESPN+	L 24–48	4,207
November 23	1:30 p.m.	at Cornell	Schoellkopf Field; Ithaca, NY (rivalry)	ESPN+	L 9–35	3,744
*Non-conference game; ^{†}Homecoming; Rankings from STATS Poll released prior to the game; All times are in Eastern time

== Game summaries ==
=== At Saint Francis ===
	1	2	3	4	Total
Lions	14	7	3	7	31
Red Flash	14	0	0	0	14

=== Georgetown ===
	1	2	3	4	Total
Hoyas	0	7	10	7	24
Lions	7	0	0	3	10

=== At Princeton ===
	1	2	3	4	Total
Lions	3	7	0	0	10
No. 25 Tigers	7	0	7	7	21

=== Central Connecticut ===
	1	2	3	4	Total
Blue Devils	7	10	0	7	24
Lions	0	7	7	0	14

=== Penn ===
	1	2	3	4	Total
Quakers	0	0	0	6	6
Lions	10	7	13	14	44

=== At Dartmouth ===
	1	2	3	4	Total
Lions	3	7	14	0	24
No. 17 Big Green	10	28	14	7	59

=== At Yale ===
	1	2	3	4	Total
Lions	0	3	0	7	10
Bulldogs	7	14	3	21	45

=== Harvard ===
	1	2	3	4	OT	Total
Crimson	7	0	0	3	0	10
Lions	0	7	0	3	7	17

=== Brown ===
	1	2	3	4	Total
Bears	21	7	20	0	48
Lions	0	17	7	0	24

=== At Cornell ===
	1	2	3	4	Total
Lions	0	9	0	0	9
Big Red	7	14	14	0	35
