= J. P. Taravella High School =

Location
- 10600 Riverside Drive; Coral Springs, Florida 33071; 26°13′56″N 80°16′05″W

Information
- School type: public high school
- Founded: 1981; 45 years ago
- School board: Broward County Public Schools
- Superintendent: Dr. Howard Hepburn
- Principal: Marietta DeArmas
- Teaching staff: 100.60 (FTE)
- Grades: 9–12
- Enrollment: 2,516 (2023–2024)
- Student to teacher ratio: 25.01
- Area: Broward County
- Colors: Silver and Blue
- Mascot: Trojan Man
- Team name: Trojans
- Website: taravella.browardschools.com

J.P. Taravella High School is a public secondary school in Coral Springs serving grades 9–12 as part of Broward County Public Schools. Founded in 1981, the school is named in honor of Joseph Phillip Taravella—president and chairman of Coral Ridge Properties, Inc., a subsidiary of Westinghouse Electric Corporation, and a founder of the City of Coral Springs.

== Academics ==
J.P. Taravella offers a range of academic opportunities. Its course offerings include Career and Technical Education (CTE) and vocational programs, Cambridge/AICE courses, and Advanced Placement courses through the College Board, along with dual enrollment courses being available for eligible students through partnerships with Broward College, Florida Atlantic University, Florida International University, the University of Florida, and Embry–Riddle Aeronautical University.

As of November 2026, J.P. Taravella is a public high school ranked 398th in the State of Florida and 7,426th nationally. There is an Advanced Placement exam participation rate of 32% at the school, with 13% of students having passed at least one of these exams.

== Recognition ==
2026 – Silver Knight Honorable Mention: A student from the school received an honorable mention in the speech category at the 2026 Silver Knight Awards.

2026 – SkillsUSA State Placement: A team from the school placed third in Engineering Technology and Design at the SkillsUSA Florida State Leadership and Skills Conference, which was also achieved in 2025 and 2023.

2026 – Competitive Cheer District Champions: Taravella’s Competitive Cheer Team captured the district title.

2025 – “A” School Grade (Broward County): J.P. Taravella High School earned an “A” rating from Broward County Public Schools.

2025 – NJROTC Honors: The NJROTC program earned 2nd Place at Nova High School’s Brain Brawl academic competition.

2025 – Thespian District Awards: The drama program earned 4 Critics’ Choice Awards, 3 Honorable Mentions, 6 Top Honors, 11 Superiors, and 18 Excellents at the District Thespian Festival.

2025 – Marching Band Invitational Honors: The Marching Band placed 2nd in Class 2A and received Best in Class Percussion at the Falcon Sound Invitational.

2025 – FHSAA State Swimming Champion: A Taravella swimmer became State Champion in both the 50 Freestyle and 100 Freestyle in the Florida High School Athletic Association State Swimming Series.

2025 – Cross Country Championships: The boys’ cross country team won the Bob Shever NW Area Championship, while the girls’ team placed third overall.

2024 – “B” School Grade (Broward County): J. P. Taravella High School earned a “B” rating from Broward County Public Schools, improving from having been rated as a "C" school for several years.

2018 – Bands of America Regional Finalist: The Marching Band finished 10th at the Orlando Regional Competition of Bands of America and advanced to Regional Finals.

2017 – ACE Mentoring Design Contest: J.P. Taravella's team, mentored by Current Builders, competed in the Broward County ACE Mentor design challenge for the proposed Miami Beckham United Soccer Stadium, with a J.P. Taravella student winning a $2,000 ACE Mentor Award scholarship for their team's wind-tunnel-optimized design.

2015 – State Thespian Mainstage Selection: The Drama Club was selected to perform Ragtime at the Florida State Thespian Festival Mainstage.

2009 – Presidential Inaugural Parade Selection: The J.P. Taravella Marching Band was selected by the Presidential Inaugural Committee to represent Florida in the 2009 Presidential Inaugural Parade in Washington, D.C.

2009 – National Speech & Debate Success: At the National Forensic League (now National Speech & Debate Association) National Tournament, Taravella students earned multiple top-six national finishes in Extemporaneous Speaking and Public Forum Debate.

1988 – National Blue Ribbon School of Excellence: Recipient of the National Blue Ribbon Schools Program Award.

== Demographics ==
As of the 2025–26 school year, the total student enrollment was 2,280. The ethnic makeup of the school was 43.2% Black, 35.2% Hispanic, 15.6% White, 3.1% Multiracial, 2.5% Asian, and 0.4% from other racial groups (with individual counts suppressed for having fewer than 10 students in each respective group). Additionally, 52.1% of the student body was considered economically disadvantaged.

== Notable alumni ==
- Nevelle Clarke, professional football player for the New Orleans Breakers
- Darwin Espinal (Class of 2013), professional soccer player for the Tampa Bay Rowdies
- Matt Ford (Class of 1999), former major league baseball player
- Chad Gilbert, lead guitarist and composer for the Pop Punk band New Found Glory
- Jonathan Lovitz (Class of 2002, 2002 Miami Herald Silver Knight Award Winner), Advocate, politician, political commentator
- Dan Morgan (Class of 1997), former NFL football player
- Scott Putesky (Class of 1986), aka Daisy Berkowitz, musician
- Todd Weiner, former NFL football player
- Jeordie White (Class of 1989), aka Twiggy Ramirez, bassist
- Robbie Widlansky, baseball player
- Todd Widom (Class of 2001), professional tennis player

== Incidents ==
=== 2015 ===
During the 2014–15 school year two small fires, two fights and the arrest of a student at J.P. Taravella High School prompted major concern. Through the rest of the week there was a heavy police presence at the school. The Broward School District said more officers than usual were at the school Wednesday "as an extra precaution and deterrent to potential disruptions," spokeswoman Nadine Drew said. "The school operated its normal schedule of classes and activities today, without incident."

=== 2017 ===
On March 6, 2017, a violent fight broke out between students in the school's parking lot behind the cafeteria. A video shows a female student being dragged across a parking lot by her hair, then being beaten by the other student, who punches her and kicks her in the head.

During the week of May 14 – May 20 during the 2016–2017 school year, the school received a series of gun threats and lock-downs.

=== 2018 ===
During the 2017–2018 school year, student Tyler Ahrens was arrested on Tuesday, April 4 for threatening to "shoot up" JP Taravella. Ahrens made posts on social media which read "I want to be a professional school shooter (no sarcasm, Broward County Florida) JP Taravella HS is my target tomorrow. I’M LEGIT NOT JOKING AROUND! SPREAD MY MESSAGE!!!!" and "For who ever is reading this, I will be shooting up my high school in Broward County FL. Tomorrow afternoon at 12:00 when school starts. Round 2. JP Travels HS! (I am legit, make my presence known)." under the screen name "Sharp Shooter." This comes just two months after the deadly shooting at Taravella's sister school Marjory Stoneman Douglas High School. Ahrens pleaded not guilty on May 11, 2018, and remains on house arrest.

On October 2, 2018, during the 2018–2019 school year, JP Taravella's wrestling coach, Dustin Roy Garvin, was arrested for soliciting sexual acts with a minor online. The Florida Department of Law Enforcement conducted an undercover operation targeting J.P. Taravella High School assistant wrestling coach 32-year-old Dustin Roy Garvin on Aug. 30, 2017. Coral Springs Police, FBI and Broward Sheriff's Office officials took Garvin into custody at the school, Tuesday, after authorities said he had sexual conversations with an undercover agent who posed as the father of a 13-year-old boy. Officials said Garvin created a Craigslist ad under the username "Dirty Dusty" that solicited sexual favors from children. An undercover agent exchanged multiple conversations with Garvin in which, police said, he requested photos of the alleged boy. On October 3, 2018, Garvin was released on a $35,000 bond.
