= 2019 Dartmouth Big Green football team =

American college football season

2019 Dartmouth Big Green football

Ivy League co-champion
- Conference: Ivy League

Ranking
- STATS: No. 22
- FCS Coaches: No. 21
- Record: 9–1 (6–1 Ivy)
- Head coach: Buddy Teevens (20th season)
- Offensive coordinator: Kevin Daft (3rd season)
- Offensive scheme: Option
- Defensive coordinator: Don Dobes (10th season)
- Base defense: 4–3
- Home stadium: Memorial Field

2019 Ivy League football standings
	Conf.			Overall
Team	W		L	W		L
No. 22 Dartmouth +	6	–	1	9	–	1
No. 25 Yale +	6	–	1	9	–	1
Princeton	5	–	2	8	–	2
Penn	3	–	4	5	–	5
Cornell	3	–	4	4	–	6
Harvard	2	–	5	4	–	6
Columbia	2	–	5	3	–	7
Brown	1	–	6	2	–	8
+ – Conference co-champions; Rankings from STATS Poll

The 2019 Dartmouth Big Green football team represented Dartmouth College in the 2019 NCAA Division I FCS football season as a member of the Ivy League. The Big Green were led by head coach Buddy Teevens in his 15th straight year and 20th overall. They played their home games at Memorial Field. They finished the season 9–1 overall and 6–1 in Ivy League play share of the Ivy League title with Yale. Dartmouth averaged 8,378 fans per game.

== Preseason ==
=== Preseason media poll ===
The Ivy League released their preseason media poll on August 8, 2019. The Big Green were picked to finish in second place.

== Schedule ==
Date	Time	Opponent	Rank	Site	TV	Result	Attendance
September 21	1:00 p.m.	at Jacksonville*		D. B. Milne Field; Jacksonville, FL	ESPN+	W 35–6	2,077
September 28	6:00 p.m.	Colgate*		Memorial Field; Hanover, NH	ESPN+	W 38–3	6,122
October 4	7:00 p.m.	at Penn		Franklin Field; Philadelphia, PA	ESPNU	W 28–15	8,257
October 12	1:30 p.m.	Yale^{†}		Memorial Field; Hanover, NH	ESPN+	W 42–10	6,796
October 19	Noon	at Marist*	No. 21	Tenney Stadium at Leonidoff Field; Poughkeepsie, NY	RFN	W 49–7	1,188
October 25	6:00 p.m.	Columbia	No. 17	Memorial Field; Hanover, NH	ESPNU	W 59–24	4,221
November 2	1:00 p.m.	at Harvard	No. 15	Harvard Stadium; Boston, MA (rivalry)	ESPN+	W 9–6	20,112
November 9	3:30 p.m.	vs. No. 10 Princeton	No. 13	Yankee Stadium; Bronx, NY	ESPNU	W 27–10	21,506
November 16	1:30 p.m.	Cornell	No. 11	Memorial Field; Hanover, NH (rivalry)	ESPN+	L 17–20	3,245
November 23	12:30 p.m.	at Brown	No. 22	Brown Stadium; Providence, RI	ESPN+	W 29–23	3,264
*Non-conference game; ^{†}Homecoming; Rankings from STATS Poll released prior to the game; All times are in Eastern time

== Game summaries ==
=== At Jacksonville ===
	1	2	3	4	Total
Big Green	14	14	7	0	35
Dolphins	0	0	0	6	6

=== Colgate ===
	1	2	3	4	Total
Raiders	0	0	3	0	3
Big Green	14	10	7	7	38

=== At Penn ===
	1	2	3	4	Total
Big Green	14	7	0	7	28
Quakers	0	7	0	8	15

=== Yale ===
	1	2	3	4	Total
Bulldogs	0	3	0	7	10
Big Green	21	7	14	0	42

=== At Marist ===
	1	2	3	4	Total
No. 21 Big Green	14	21	7	7	49
Red Foxes	0	0	0	7	7

=== Columbia ===
	1	2	3	4	Total
Lions	3	7	14	0	24
No. 17 Big Green	10	28	14	7	59

=== At Harvard ===
	1	2	3	4	Total
No. 15 Big Green	0	3	0	6	9
Crimson	3	0	0	3	6

=== Vs. Princeton ===
	1	2	3	4	Total
No. 10 Tigers	0	7	3	0	10
No. 13 Big Green	7	10	3	7	27

=== Cornell ===
	1	2	3	4	Total
Big Red	3	3	6	8	20
No. 11 Big Green	7	7	0	3	17

=== At Brown ===
	1	2	3	4	Total
No. 22 Big Green	0	7	7	15	29
Bears	3	7	13	0	23

== Ranking movements ==
Ranking movements Legend: ██ Increase in ranking ██ Decrease in ranking RV = Received votes
	Week														
Poll	Pre	1	2	3	4	5	6	7	8	9	10	11	12	13	Final
STATS FCS	RV							21	17	15	13	11	22		
Coaches	RV							21	16	14	13	12	21		
