= Rob Sgarlata =

American football player and coach

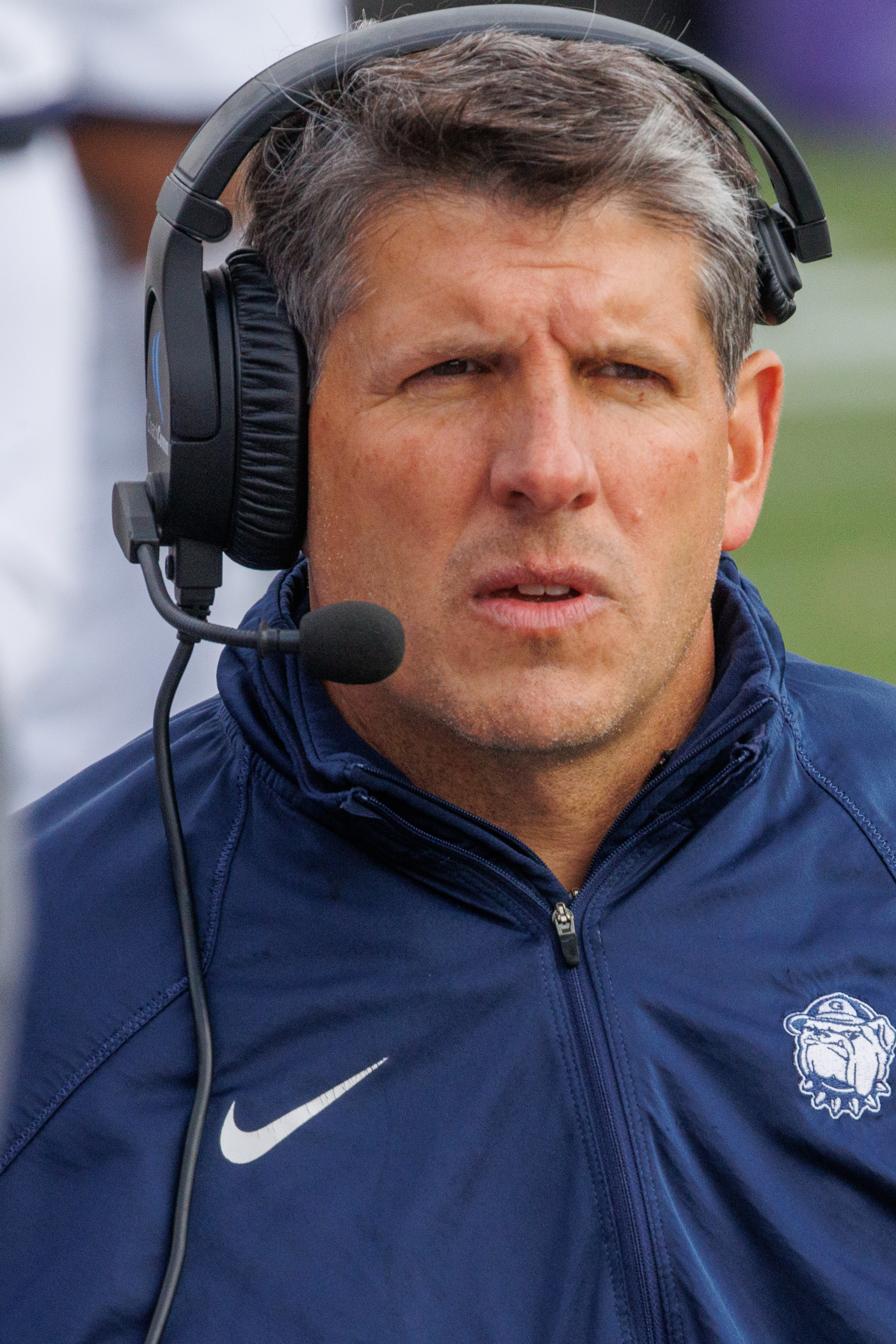

Current position
- Title: Head coach
- Team: Georgetown
- Conference: Patriot
- Record: 43–84

Biographical details
- Born: May 18, 1972 (age 54); Nyack, New York, U.S.

Playing career
- 1990–1993: Georgetown
- Position: Running back

Coaching career (HC unless noted)
- 1995–1996: Georgetown (DL)
- 1997–2000: Georgetown (WR/TE)
- 2001: Georgetown (OL)
- 2002–2005: Georgetown (DL)
- 2006–2013: Georgetown (DC/DB)
- 2014–present: Georgetown

Head coaching record
- Overall: 43–84

Rob Sgarlata is an American football coach and former player. He is the head football coach at the Georgetown University and has held that position since 2014.

== Head coaching record ==
Year	Team	Overall	Conference	Standing	Bowl/playoffs
Georgetown Hoyas (Patriot League) (2014–present)
2014	Georgetown	3–8	1–5	7th	
2015	Georgetown	4–7	2–4	5th	
2016	Georgetown	3–8	0–6	7th	
2017	Georgetown	1–10	0–6	7th	
2018	Georgetown	5–6	4–2	T–2nd	
2019	Georgetown	5–6	1–5	7th	
2020–21	No team—COVID-19				
2021	Georgetown	2–8	1–5	6th	
2022	Georgetown	2–9	1–5	7th	
2023	Georgetown	5–6	3–3	4th	
2024	Georgetown	5–6	2–4	T–4th	
2025	Georgetown	6–6	3–4	T–3rd	
2026	Georgetown	2–4	2–2		
Georgetown:		43–84	20–50		
Total:		43–84			
