= 2019 Harvard Crimson football team =

American college football season

2019 Harvard Crimson football

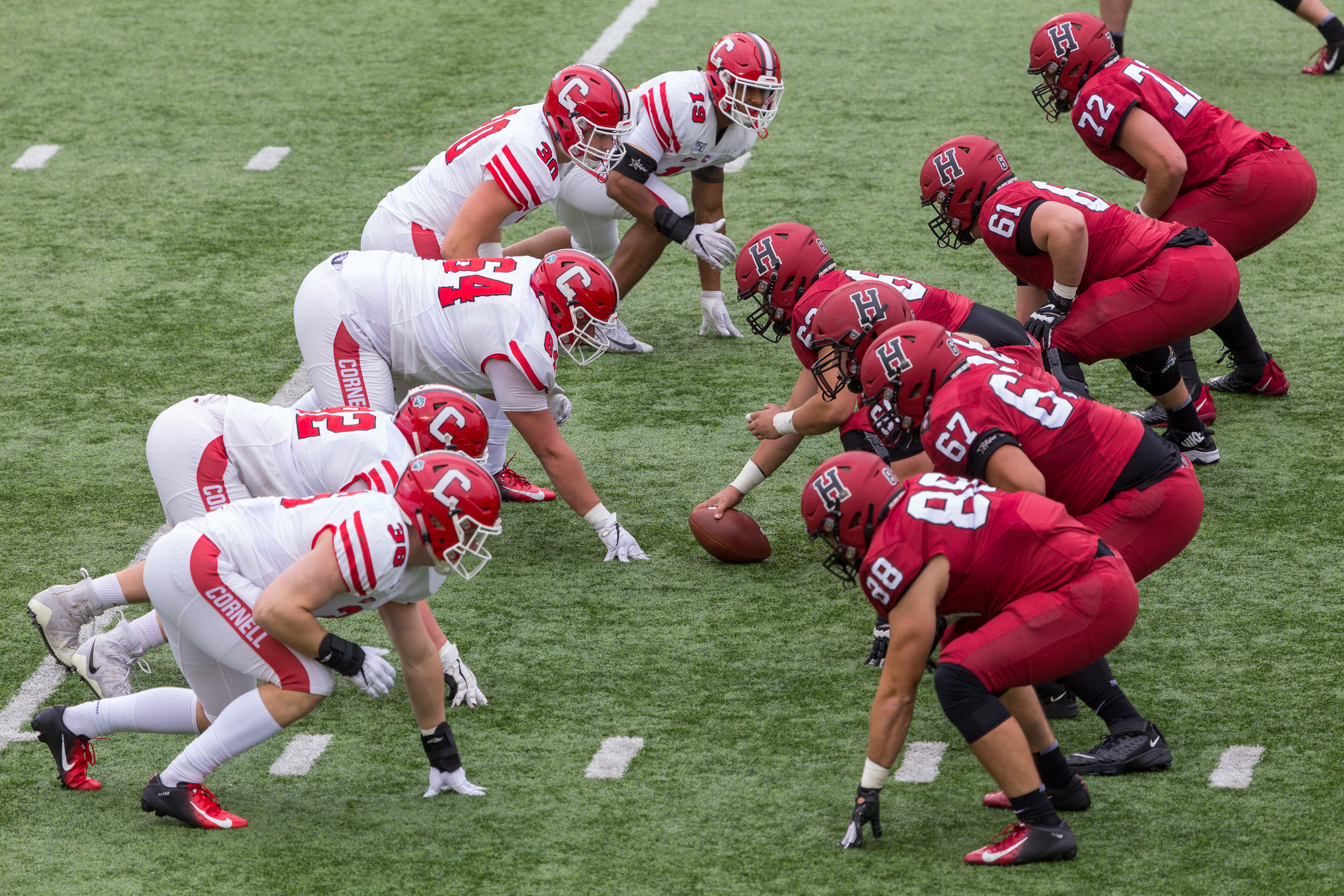
- The Crimson defeated Cornell, 35-22
- Conference: Ivy League
- Record: 4–6 (2–5 Ivy)
- Head coach: Tim Murphy (26th season)
- Offensive coordinator: Joel Lamb (14th season)
- Offensive scheme: Spread
- Defensive coordinator: Scott Larkee (11th season)
- Base defense: 4–3
- Home stadium: Harvard Stadium

Uniform
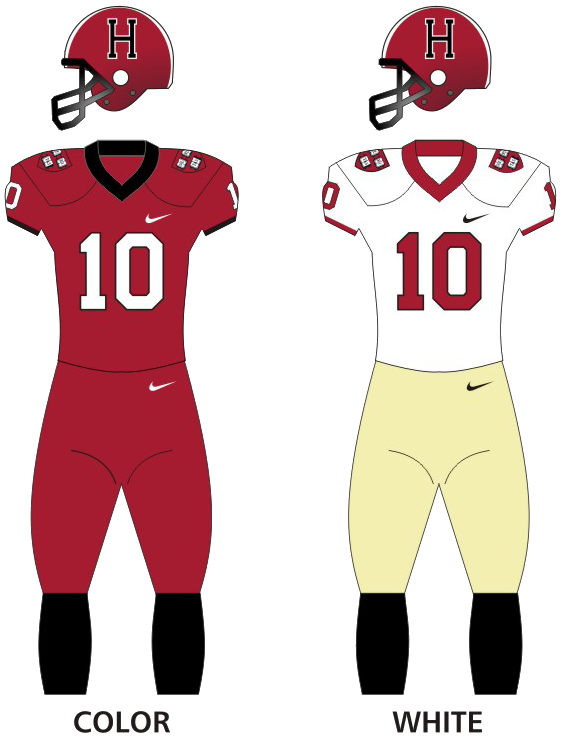

2019 Ivy League football standings
	Conf.			Overall
Team	W		L	W		L
No. 22 Dartmouth +	6	–	1	9	–	1
No. 25 Yale +	6	–	1	9	–	1
Princeton	5	–	2	8	–	2
Penn	3	–	4	5	–	5
Cornell	3	–	4	4	–	6
Harvard	2	–	5	4	–	6
Columbia	2	–	5	3	–	7
Brown	1	–	6	2	–	8
+ – Conference co-champions; Rankings from STATS Poll

The 2019 Harvard Crimson football team represented Harvard University during the 2019 NCAA Division I FCS football season as a member of the Ivy League. They were led by 26th-year head coach Tim Murphy and played their home games at Harvard Stadium. They finished the season 4–6 overall and 2–5 in Ivy League play to tie for sixth place. Harvard averaged 10,812 fans per game.

== Schedule ==
Date	Time	Opponent	Site	TV	Result	Attendance
September 21	4:00 pm	at San Diego*	Torero Stadium; San Diego, CA	WCC Network	L 23–31	2,607
September 27	7:00 p.m.	Brown	Harvard Stadium; Boston, MA	ESPNews	W 42–7	10,088
October 5	1:00 p.m.	Howard*	Harvard Stadium; Boston, MA	ESPN+	W 62–17	8,234
October 12	1:00 p.m.	Cornell	Harvard Stadium; Boston, MA	ESPN+	W 35–22	7,513
October 19	1:00 p.m.	at Holy Cross*	Fitton Field; Worcester, MA	PLN	W 31–21	10,381
October 26	1:00 p.m.	at No. 13 Princeton	Powers Field at Princeton Stadium; Princeton, NJ (rivalry)	ESPN+	L 24–30	9,078
November 2	1:00 p.m.	No. 15 Dartmouth	Harvard Stadium; Boston, MA (rivalry)	ESPN+	L 6–9	20,112
November 9	1:00 p.m.	at Columbia	Robert K. Kraft Field at Lawrence A. Wien Stadium; New York, NY	ESPN+/SNY	L 10–17 ^{OT}	4,739
November 16	12:00 p.m.	Penn	Harvard Stadium; Boston, MA (rivalry)	ESPN+/NESN	L 20–24	8,113
November 23	12:00 p.m.	at No. 24 Yale	Yale Bowl; New Haven, CT (rivalry)	ESPNU	L 43–50 ^{2OT}	44,989
*Non-conference game; Rankings from STATS Poll released prior to the game; All times are in Eastern time

== Preseason ==
=== Preseason media poll ===
The Ivy League released their preseason media poll on August 8, 2019. The Crimson were picked to finish in fourth place.

== Game summaries ==
=== At San Diego ===
	1	2	3	4	Total
Crimson	0	0	7	16	23
Toreros	10	14	7	0	31

=== Brown ===
	1	2	3	4	Total
Bears	7	0	0	0	7
Crimson	7	14	7	14	42

=== Howard ===
	1	2	3	4	Total
Bison	3	0	7	7	17
Crimson	7	34	14	7	62

=== Cornell ===
	1	2	3	4	Total
Big Red	7	3	0	12	22
Crimson	7	21	0	7	35

=== At Holy Cross ===
	1	2	3	4	Total
Crimson	17	7	7	0	31
Crusaders	7	0	7	7	21

=== At Princeton ===
	1	2	3	4	Total
Crimson	0	14	0	10	24
No. 13 Tigers	10	0	13	7	30

=== Dartmouth ===
	1	2	3	4	Total
No. 15 Big Green	0	3	0	6	9
Crimson	3	0	0	3	6

=== At Columbia ===
	1	2	3	4	OT	Total
Crimson	7	0	0	3	0	10
Lions	0	7	0	3	7	17

=== Penn ===
	1	2	3	4	Total
Quakers	7	3	7	7	24
Crimson	7	6	7	0	20

=== At Yale ===
	1	2	3	4	OT	2OT	Total
Crimson	3	12	14	7	7	0	43
No. 24 Bulldogs	3	0	16	17	7	7	50
