= 2019 Lafayette Leopards football team =

American college football season

2019 Lafayette Leopards football
- Conference: Patriot League
- Record: 4–8 (4–2 Patriot)
- Head coach: John Garrett (3rd season)
- Defensive coordinator: Manny Rojas (1st season)
- Home stadium: Fisher Field

Uniform
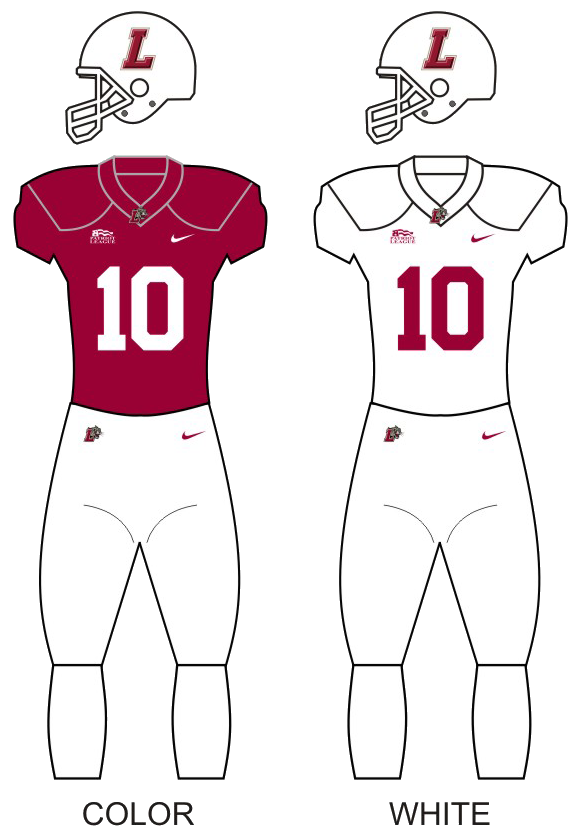

2019 Patriot League football standings
	Conf.			Overall
Team	W		L	W		L
Holy Cross $^	5	–	1	7	–	5
Lafayette	4	–	2	4	–	8
Bucknell	3	–	3	3	–	8
Lehigh	3	–	3	4	–	7
Colgate	3	–	3	4	–	8
Fordham	2	–	4	4	–	8
Georgetown	1	–	5	5	–	6
$ – Conference champion; ^ – FCS playoff participant

The 2019 Lafayette Leopards football team represented Lafayette College in the 2019 NCAA Division I FCS football season. The Leopards were led by third-year head coach John Garrett and played their home games at Fisher Field. They were a member of the Patriot League.

== Preseason ==
=== Preseason coaches' poll ===
The Patriot League released their preseason coaches' poll on July 30, 2019 (voting was by conference head coaches and sports information directors). The Leopards were picked to finish in sixth place.

=== Preseason All-Patriot League team ===
The Leopards had four players selected to the preseason All-Patriot League team.

Offense

Nick Pearson – WR

Jake Marotti – OL

Defense

Malik Hamm – DL

Yasir Thomas – DB

== Schedule ==
Date	Time	Opponent	Site	TV	Result	Attendance
August 31	6:00 p.m.	at William & Mary*	Zable Stadium; Williamsburg, VA	FloSports	L 17–30	10,167
September 7	1:00 p.m.	at Monmouth*	Kessler Stadium; West Long Branch, NJ	ESPN+	L 21–24	2,955
September 14	12:30 p.m.	Sacred Heart*	Fisher Stadium; Easton, PA	Stadium	L 40–56	5,119
September 21	7:00 p.m.	at Albany*	Bob Ford Field at Tom & Mary Casey Stadium; Albany, NY	FloSports	L 7–36	3,241
September 28	3:30 p.m.	Penn*^{†}	Fisher Stadium; Easton, PA (rivalry)	Stadium	L 24–28	4,911
October 11	7:00 p.m.	at No. 21 Princeton*	Powers Field at Princeton Stadium; Princeton, NJ	ESPNU	L 3–28	4,521
October 19	12:00 p.m.	at Georgetown	Cooper Field; Washington, DC	Stadium	L 10–14	1,984
October 26	3:30 p.m.	Bucknell	Fisher Stadium; Easton, PA (rivalry)	Stadium	W 21–17	5,325
November 2	12:30 p.m.	Fordham	Fisher Stadium; Easton, PA	Stadium	W 38–34	3,505
November 9	12:00 p.m.	at Holy Cross	Fitton Field; Worcester, MA	Stadium	W 23–20	5,236
November 16	12:30 p.m.	Colgate	Fisher Stadium; Easton, PA	Stadium	L 0–16	
November 23	12:30 p.m.	at Lehigh	Goodman Stadium; Bethlehem, PA (The Rivalry)	Stadium; WFMZ	W 17–16	13,292
*Non-conference game; ^{†}Homecoming; Rankings from STATS Poll released prior to the game; All times are in Eastern time

== Game summaries ==
=== At William & Mary ===
	1	2	3	4	Total
Leopards	7	3	0	7	17
Tribe	6	0	24	0	30

=== At Monmouth ===
	1	2	3	4	Total
Leopards	0	7	7	7	21
Hawks	7	14	0	3	24

=== Sacred Heart ===
	1	2	3	4	Total
Pioneers	14	7	21	14	56
Leopards	3	21	3	13	40

=== At Albany ===
	1	2	3	4	Total
Leopards	0	0	0	7	7
Great Danes	12	10	0	14	36

=== Penn ===
	1	2	3	4	Total
Quakers	0	14	0	14	28
Leopards	3	7	0	14	24

=== At Princeton ===
	1	2	3	4	Total
Leopards	0	3	0	0	3
No. 21 Tigers	7	7	14	0	28

=== At Georgetown ===
	1	2	3	4	Total
Leopards	7	3	0	0	10
Hoyas	7	7	0	0	14

=== Bucknell ===
	1	2	3	4	Total
Bison	7	7	3	0	17
Leopards	7	0	0	14	21

=== Fordham ===
	1	2	3	4	Total
Rams	0	7	10	17	34
Leopards	17	7	7	7	38

=== At Holy Cross ===
	1	2	3	4	Total
Leopards	14	3	6	0	23
Crusaders	3	7	3	7	20

=== Colgate ===
	1	2	3	4	Total
Raiders	6	0	7	3	16
Leopards	0	0	0	0	0

=== At Lehigh ===
	1	2	3	4	Total
Leopards	7	0	7	3	17
Mountain Hawks	0	7	3	6	16
