= 2019 Yale Bulldogs football team =

American college football season

2019 Yale Bulldogs football

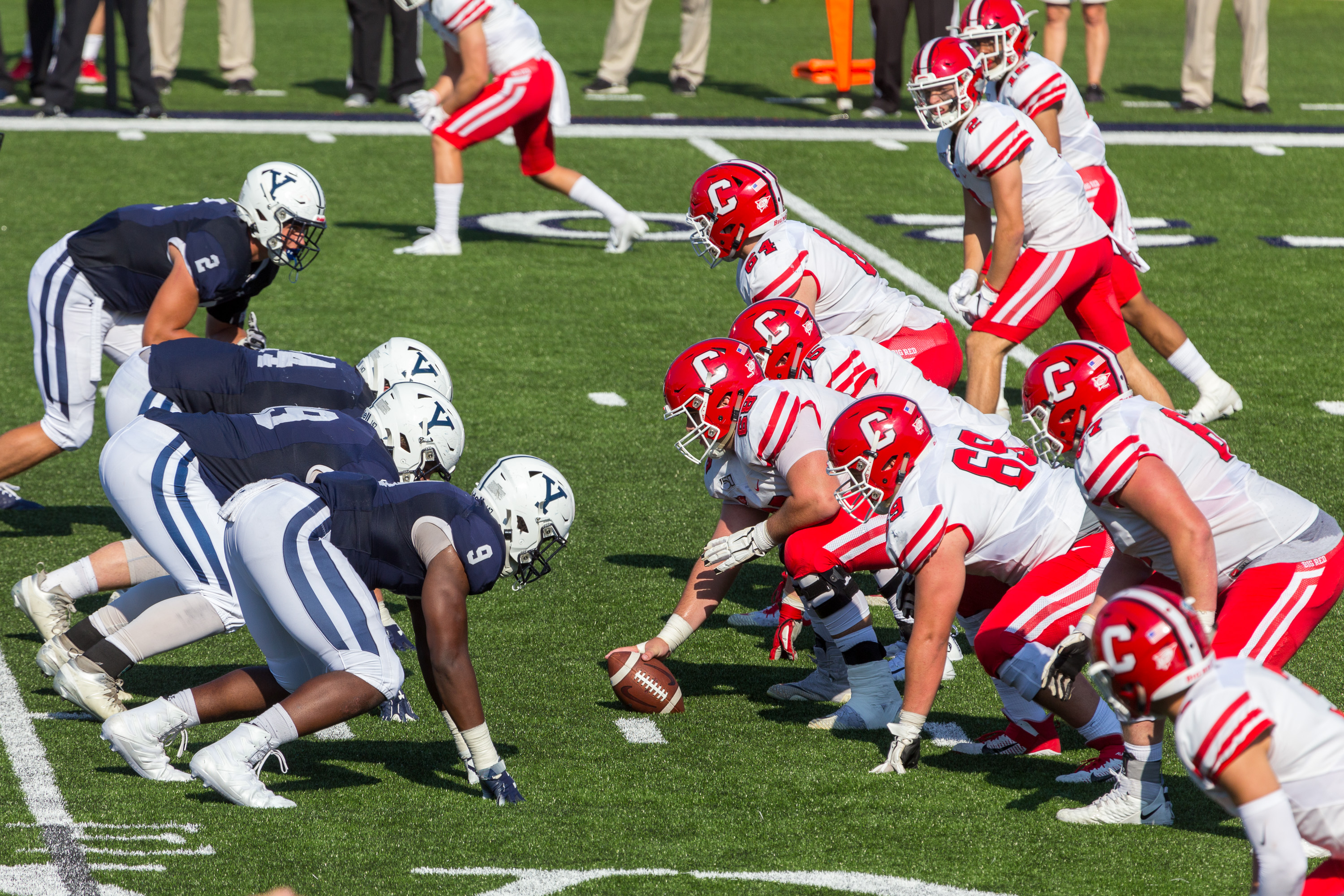
- The Bulldogs defeated Cornell, 27–16

Ivy League co-champion
- Conference: Ivy League

Ranking
- STATS: No. 25
- FCS Coaches: No. 24
- Record: 9–1 (6–1 Ivy)
- Head coach: Tony Reno (8th season)
- Offensive coordinator: Kevin Cahill (2nd season)
- Offensive scheme: Pro spread
- Defensive coordinator: Sean McGowan (3rd season)
- Base defense: 4–2–5
- Home stadium: Yale Bowl

Uniform
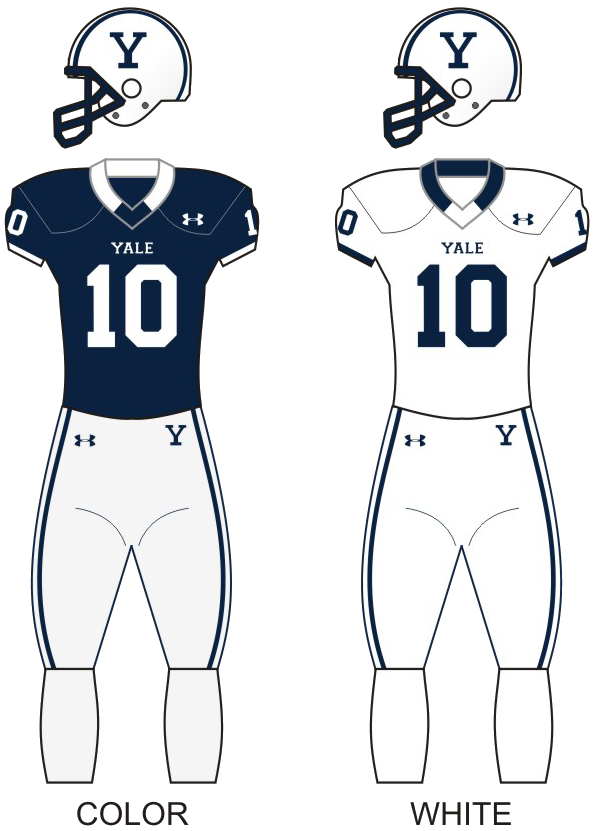

2019 Ivy League football standings
	Conf.			Overall
Team	W		L	W		L
No. 22 Dartmouth +	6	–	1	9	–	1
No. 25 Yale +	6	–	1	9	–	1
Princeton	5	–	2	8	–	2
Penn	3	–	4	5	–	5
Cornell	3	–	4	4	–	6
Harvard	2	–	5	4	–	6
Columbia	2	–	5	3	–	7
Brown	1	–	6	2	–	8
+ – Conference co-champions; Rankings from STATS Poll

The 2019 Yale Bulldogs football team represented Yale University in the 2019 NCAA Division I FCS football season. The season marked the Bulldogs's 147th overall season. The team played its home games at the Yale Bowl in New Haven, Connecticut and were led by eighth-year head coach Tony Reno. They were members of the Ivy League. They finished the season 9–1 overall and 6–1 in Ivy League play to share the Ivy League title with Dartmouth. Yale averaged 12,132 fans per game.

== Preseason ==
=== Preseason media poll ===
The Ivy League released their preseason media poll on August 8, 2019. The Bulldogs were picked to finish in first place.

== Schedule ==
Date	Time	Opponent	Rank	Site	TV	Result	Attendance
September 21	1:00 p.m.	Holy Cross*		Yale Bowl; New Haven, CT	ESPN+	W 23–10	5,684
September 28	1:00 p.m.	Cornell		Yale Bowl; New Haven, CT	ESPN+	W 27–16	5,723
October 5	1:00 p.m.	Fordham*		Yale Bowl; New Haven, CT	ESPN+/NESN Plus	W 48–24	5,743
October 12	1:30 p.m.	at Dartmouth		Memorial Field; Hanover, NH	ESPN+	L 10–42	6,796
October 19	6:00 p.m.	at Richmond*		E. Claiborne Robins Stadium; Richmond, VA	FloSports	W 28–27	7,510
October 26	12:00 p.m.	Penn		Yale Bowl; New Haven, CT	ESPN+/NESN	W 46–41	4,990
November 2	12:00 p.m.	Columbia		Yale Bowl; New Haven, CT	ESPN+	W 45–10	5,667
November 9	12:30 p.m.	at Brown		Brown Stadium; Providence, RI	ESPN+	W 59–35	2,876
November 16	1:00 p.m.	at No. 18 Princeton		Powers Field at Princeton Stadium; Princeton, NJ (rivalry)	ESPN+	W 51–14	6,676
November 23	12:00 p.m.	Harvard	No. 24	Yale Bowl; New Haven, CT (rivalry)	ESPNU	W 50–43 ^{2OT}	44,989
*Non-conference game; Rankings from STATS Poll released prior to the game; All times are in Eastern time

== Ranking movements ==
Ranking movements Legend: ██ Increase in ranking ██ Decrease in ranking — = Not ranked RV = Received votes
	Week													
Poll	Pre	1	2	3	4	5	6	7	8	9	10	11	12	Final
STATS FCS	RV	RV	RV	RV	RV	RV	RV	RV	RV	RV	RV	RV	24	25
Coaches	RV	RV	RV	RV	RV	RV	RV	—	—	RV	RV	RV	25	24

== Roster ==
2019 Yale Bulldogs football team roster
Players
Coaches
Offense

Pos.	#	Name	Class
RB	1	Trenton Charles	So
RB	2	Alan Lamar	Sr
WR	3	Garrett White	Sr
WR	4	Darrion Carrington	Jr
WR	5	Jaylan Sandifer	So
QB	6	Kurt Rawlings	Sr
QB	8	Patrick Conte	Jr
WR	11	Caden Herring	Sr
QB	12	Nolan Grooms	Fr
WR	13	Keith C. J. McCord II	Sr
WR	14	Reed Klubnik	Sr
QB	16	Griffin O'Connor	So
WR	17	Seun Omonije	So
RB	18	Josh Eboboko	Fr
QB	19	Jimmy Check	Jr
WR	20	Jack Biestek	So
RB	22	Elliott McElwain	So
WR	23	Noah Aaron	So
RB	24	Spencer Alston	So
RB	32	Joshua McKenzie	Fr
RB	33	Zane Dudek	Jr
TE	44	Sasha Hoban	Jr
OL	53	Ryan McCann	Fr
OL	55	Jacob Hinish	Jr
OL	57	Cubby Schuller	So
OL	63	Jonathon Durand	Fr
OL	65	Josh de St. Jean	So
OL	66	Nick Gargiulo	So
OL	68	Grant Neagli	Jr
OL	69	Jack Twyford	Fr
OL	70	Brandon Babcock	Fr
OL	71	Tyler Jost	Jr
OL	72	Dieter Eiselen	Sr
OL	73	Lucas Tribble	Sr
OL	74	Sterling Strother	Sr
OL	75	Cameron Warfield	Jr
OL	76	Jonathan Mendoza	Fr
OL	77	Jarrett Sexton	Sr
OL	78	Steven Cepalia	Sr
OL	79	Conor Smith	So
TE	80	J. J. Howland	Jr
WR	81	Aidan Maloney	Fr
WR	82	Mason Tipton	Fr
WR	83	Brayden Carey	Fr
TE	84	Garry Raymond	So
TE	85	Quinn Dawson	Sr
WR	86	Joey Felton	Fr
TE	87	Jackson Hawes	Fr
WR	88	J. P. Shohfi	Sr
TE	89	D. Major Roman	Jr

Defense

Pos.	#	Name	Class
DB	1	Malcolm Dixon	Sr
DE	2	Reid Nickerson	So
DB	4	Jaylan Granberry	So
DB	5	Miles Oldacre	Sr
DB	6	Jaelin Alburg	Sr
DB, WR	7	Melvin Rouse II	Jr
LB	8	Brendan MacPhee	Sr
DL	9	Osorachukwu Ifesinachukwu	So
DB	10	Darnell Robinson	So
DB	12	Gerron Duhon	Fr
LB	13	Jack Westafer	Sr
LB	15	Jordan Carey	Jr
DB	16	Jaylan Granberry	So
DB	17	Kennedy Kosmalski	So
LB	18	Ryan Burke	Sr
LB	19	Brian Abraham	So
DB	20	Tosan Agbeyegbe	Sr
DB	21	Deonte Henson	Jr
DL	24	Josh Keeler	Sr
LB	25	Micah Awodiran	Jr
LB	26	Rodney Thomas II	Jr
LB	27	Shane Frommer	So
DL	28	Christian Sampleton	Jr
DB	29	Kyle Ellis	So
LB	30	Noah Pope	So
DB	31	Archie Russ III	Fr
DB	32	Henry Segel	Sr
DB	33	Trenton Johnson	Fr
DL	34	Brett Gerber	So
LB	35	Alexander Abelite	Sr
DB	36	Wande Owens	Fr
DB	37	Dathan Hickey	So
DB	38	Du'Shaunte Holloway	Fr
DB	39	Tyler Di Ienno	Fr
LB	40	Hamilton Moore	Fr
DL	41	A. J. Ryan	Jr
LB	42	Blake Hill	Jr
LB	43	John Dean	Jr
DB	46	Jermaine Baker	Fr
DB	48	Brandon Benn	Fr
DL	50	Spencer Matthaei	Sr
DL	52	Michael Chime	Jr
DL	54	Patrick Nauert	Fr
LB	55	Joseph Vaughn	Fr
LB	56	Michael Connor	Fr
DL, TE	87	Devin Moore	Sr
DL	90	Adam Raine	So
DL	91	Jailon Henry	Fr
DL	92	Charles Callender	Sr
DL	93	Marcus Mauney	Fr
DL	94	Sean Kissel	Sr
DL	95	Isaac Mitchell	Fr
DL	96	Sebastian Bruno	So
DL	97	Clay Patterson	Fr
DL	99	Tate Goodyear	So

Special teams

Pos.	#	Name	Class
K, P	45	Jack Bosman	Fr
K	49	Sam Tuckerman	Sr
LS	51	Nick Tibbetts	So
K, P	98	Ajay Culhane	So

Head coach

- Tony Reno

Coordinators/assistant coaches

Legend

- (C) Team captain
- (S) Suspended
- (I) Ineligible
- Injured
- Redshirt

Roster

== Game summaries ==
=== Holy Cross ===
	1	2	3	4	Total
Crusaders	0	3	0	7	10
Bulldogs	6	0	7	10	23

=== Cornell ===
	1	2	3	4	Total
Big Red	0	3	7	6	16
Bulldogs	3	0	7	17	27

=== Fordham ===
	1	2	3	4	Total
Rams	7	3	0	14	24
Bulldogs	17	28	0	3	48

=== At Dartmouth ===
	1	2	3	4	Total
Bulldogs	0	3	0	7	10
Big Green	21	7	14	0	42

=== At Richmond ===
	1	2	3	4	Total
Bulldogs	0	7	7	14	28
Spiders	3	17	7	0	27

=== Penn ===
	1	2	3	4	Total
Quakers	0	13	14	14	41
Bulldogs	7	6	13	20	46

=== Columbia ===
	1	2	3	4	Total
Lions	0	3	0	7	10
Bulldogs	7	14	3	21	45

=== At Brown ===
	1	2	3	4	Total
Bulldogs	17	7	18	17	59
Bears	0	21	7	7	35

=== At Princeton ===
	1	2	3	4	Total
Bulldogs	3	27	7	14	51
No. 18 Tigers	0	7	7	0	14

=== Harvard ===
	1	2	3	4	OT	2OT	Total
Crimson	3	12	14	7	7	0	43
No. 24 Bulldogs	3	0	16	17	7	7	50
