= 2019 Holy Cross Crusaders football team =

American college football season

2019 Holy Cross Crusaders football

Patriot League champion

NCAA Division I First Round, L 27–44 vs. Monmouth
- Conference: Patriot League
- Record: 7–6 (5–1 Patriot)
- Head coach: Bob Chesney (2nd season)
- Offensive coordinator: Patrick Murphy (2nd season)
- Offensive scheme: Pro-style
- Defensive coordinator: Scott James (2nd season)
- Base defense: 4–3
- Home stadium: Fitton Field

Uniform
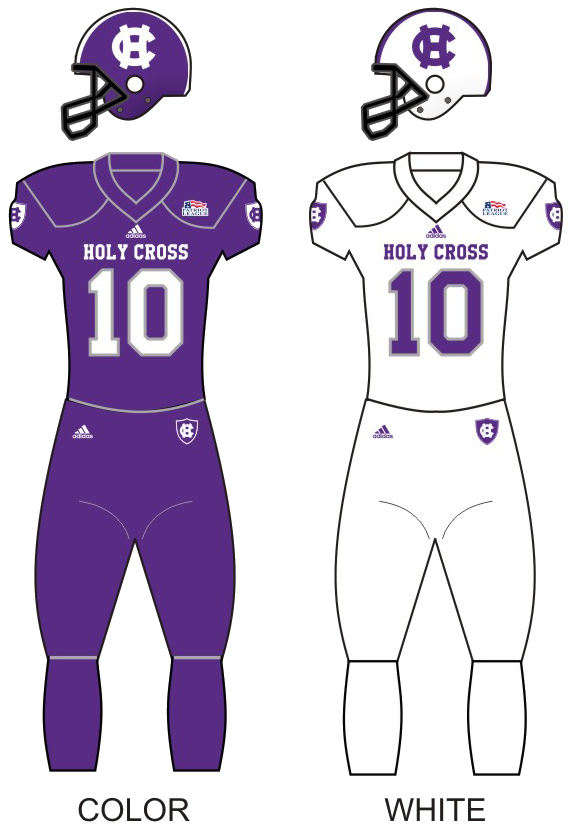

2019 Patriot League football standings
	Conf.			Overall
Team	W		L	W		L
Holy Cross $^	5	–	1	7	–	5
Lafayette	4	–	2	4	–	8
Bucknell	3	–	3	3	–	8
Lehigh	3	–	3	4	–	7
Colgate	3	–	3	4	–	8
Fordham	2	–	4	4	–	8
Georgetown	1	–	5	5	–	6
$ – Conference champion; ^ – FCS playoff participant

The 2019 Holy Cross Crusaders football team represented the College of the Holy Cross as a member of the Patriot League during the 2019 NCAA Division I FCS football season. Led by second-year head coach Bob Chesney, Holy Cross compiled an overall record of 7–6 with a mark of 5–1 in conference play, winning the Patriot League title. The Crusaders advanced to the NCAA Division I Football Championship playoffs, where they lost in the first round to Monmouth. They played their home games at Fitton Field in Worcester, Massachusetts.

== Preseason ==
=== Preseason coaches' poll ===
The Patriot League released their preseason coaches' poll on July 30, 2019 (voting was by conference head coaches and sports information directors). The Crusaders were picked to finish in second place, receiving 2 of 14 first-place votes.

=== Preseason All-Patriot League team ===
The Crusaders had three players selected to the preseason All-Patriot League team.

Offense

Domenic Cozier – RB

Brett Boddy – OL

Brian Foley – OL

== Schedule ==
Date	Time	Opponent	Site	TV	Result	Attendance
August 31	3:30 p.m.	at Navy*	Navy–Marine Corps Memorial Stadium; Annapolis, MD	CBSSN	L 7–45	28,531
September 7	1:00 p.m.	New Hampshire*	Fitton Field; Worcester, MA	Charter TV3	W 13–10	8,372
September 21	1:00 p.m.	at Yale*	Yale Bowl; New Haven, CT	ESPN+	L 10–23	5,684
September 28	12:00 p.m.	at Syracuse*	Carrier Dome; Syracuse, NY	ACCN	L 3–41	40,575
October 5	2:00 p.m.	at Bucknell	Christy Mathewson–Memorial Stadium; Lewisburg, PA	Stadium	W 21–14	2,693
October 12	12:30 p.m.	at Brown*	Brown Stadium; Providence, RI	ESPN+	W 47–31	3,026
October 19	1:00 p.m.	Harvard*^{†}	Fitton Field; Worcester, MA	Charter TV3	L 21–31	10,381
October 26	1:00 p.m.	Colgate	Fitton Field; Worcester, MA	Charter TV3	W 31–10	10,926
November 2	12:30 p.m.	at Lehigh	Goodman Stadium; Bethlehem, PA	Stadium	W 24–17	4,545
November 9	12:00 p.m.	Lafayette	Fitton Field; Worcester, MA	Charter TV3	L 20–23	5,236
November 16	1:00 p.m.	at Fordham	Coffey Field; Bronx, NY (Ram–Crusader Cup)	Stadium	W 49–27	3,704
November 23	12:30 p.m.	Georgetown	Fitton Field; Worcester, MA	Stadium	W 24–0	7,152
November 30	12:00 p.m.	at No. 14 Monmouth*	Kessler Stadium; West Long Branch, NJ (NCAA Division I First Round)	Stadium	L 27–44	2,817
*Non-conference game; ^{†}Homecoming; Rankings from STATS Poll released prior to the game; All times are in Eastern time

== Game summaries ==
=== At Navy ===
	1	2	3	4	Total
Crusaders	0	7	0	0	7
Midshipmen	10	14	14	7	45

=== New Hampshire ===
	1	2	3	4	Total
Wildcats	0	0	3	7	10
Crusaders	0	3	0	10	13

=== At Yale ===
	1	2	3	4	Total
Crusaders	0	3	0	7	10
Bulldogs	6	0	7	10	23

=== At Syracuse ===
	1	2	3	4	Total
Crusaders	0	3	0	0	3
Orange	17	7	10	7	41

=== At Bucknell ===
	1	2	3	4	Total
Crusaders	0	14	7	0	21
Bison	0	14	0	0	14

=== At Brown ===
	1	2	3	4	Total
Crusaders	13	14	7	13	47
Bears	7	10	7	7	31

=== Harvard ===
	1	2	3	4	Total
Crimson	17	7	7	0	31
Crusaders	7	0	7	7	21

=== Colgate ===
	1	2	3	4	Total
Raiders	0	3	0	7	10
Crusaders	7	14	10	0	31

=== At Lehigh ===
	1	2	3	4	Total
Crusaders	7	10	7	0	24
Mountain Hawks	0	7	7	3	17

=== Lafayette ===
	1	2	3	4	Total
Leopards	14	3	6	0	23
Crusaders	3	7	3	7	20

=== At Fordham ===
	1	2	3	4	Total
Crusaders	0	0	14	35	49
Rams	0	14	0	13	27

=== Georgetown ===
	1	2	3	4	Total
Hoyas	0	0	0	0	0
Crusaders	0	14	0	10	24

== FCS Playoffs ==
The Crusaders received an automatic bid (due to winning their conference) for the postseason tournament, with a first-round pairing against Monmouth.

=== At Monmouth–First Round ===
	1	2	3	4	Total
Crusaders	0	7	6	14	27
No. 14 Hawks	7	19	11	7	44
