= 2019 Penn Quakers football team =

American college football season

2019 Penn Quakers football

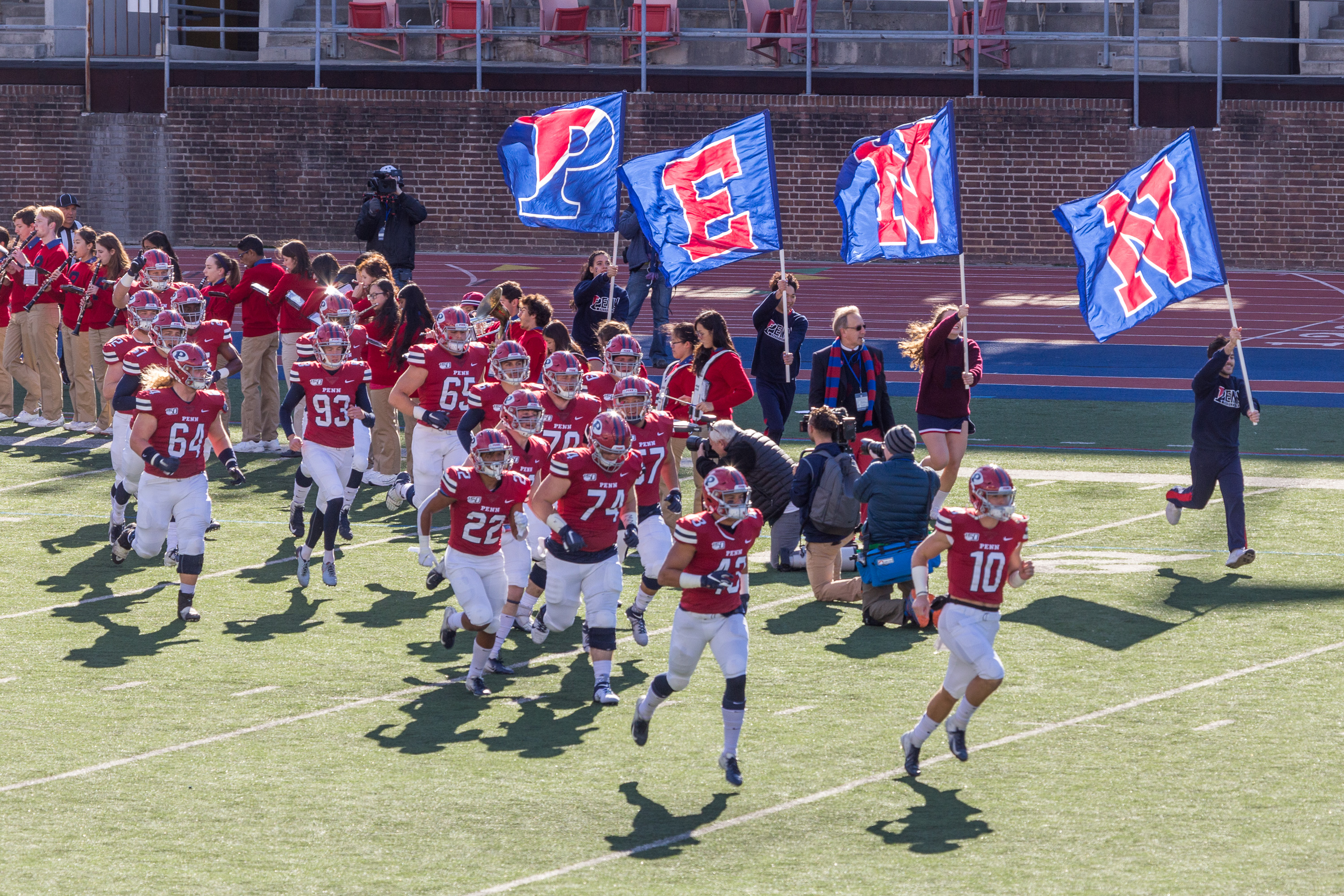
- 2019 Quakers enter Franklin Field
- Conference: Ivy League
- Record: 5–5 (3–4 Ivy)
- Head coach: Ray Priore (5th season)
- Offensive coordinator: Kevin Morris (1st season)
- Offensive scheme: Pro-style
- Defensive coordinator: Bob Benson (5th season)
- Base defense: 3–3–5
- Home stadium: Franklin Field

Uniform
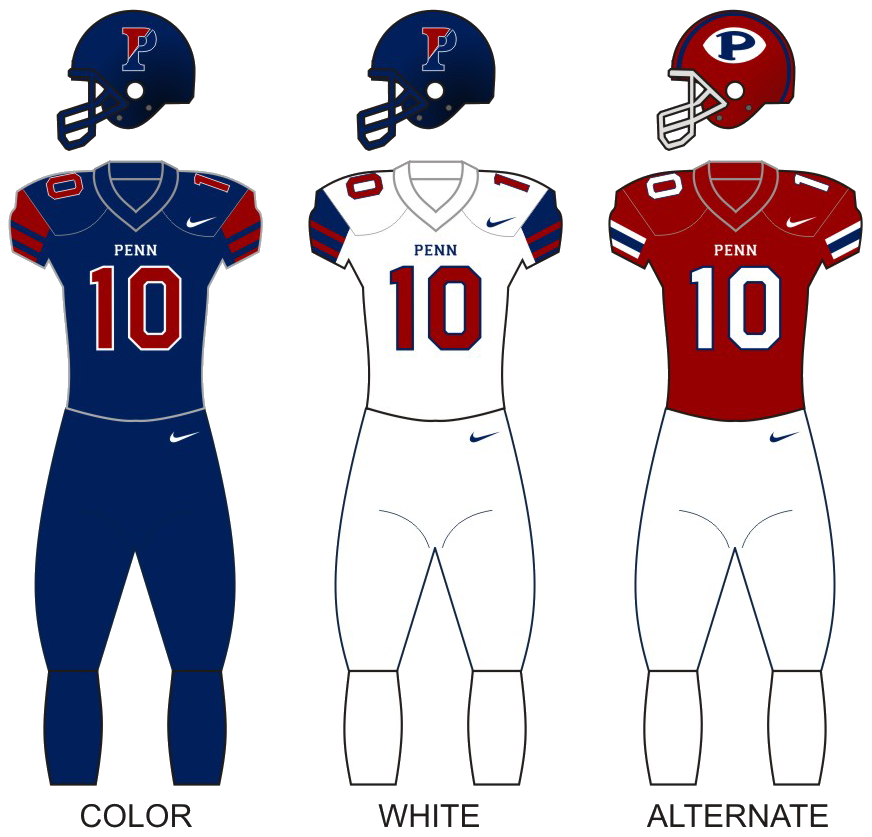

2019 Ivy League football standings
| | Conf. | | | Overall |
| Team | W | | L | W | | L |
|---|---|---|---|---|---|---|
| No. 22 Dartmouth + | 6 | – | 1 | 9 | – | 1 |
| No. 25 Yale + | 6 | – | 1 | 9 | – | 1 |
| Princeton | 5 | – | 2 | 8 | – | 2 |
| Penn | 3 | – | 4 | 5 | – | 5 |
| Cornell | 3 | – | 4 | 4 | – | 6 |
| Harvard | 2 | – | 5 | 4 | – | 6 |
| Columbia | 2 | – | 5 | 3 | – | 7 |
| Brown | 1 | – | 6 | 2 | – | 8 |
+ – Conference co-champions; Rankings from STATS Poll

The 2019 Penn Quakers football team represented the University of Pennsylvania during the 2019 NCAA Division I FCS football season. They were led by fifth-year head coach Ray Priore and played its home games at Franklin Field. It was a member of the Ivy League. They finished the season 5–5, 3–4 in Ivy League play to tie for fourth place. Penn averaged 8,426 fans per game.

== Preseason ==
=== Preseason media poll ===
The Ivy League released its preseason media poll on August 8, 2019. The Quakers were picked to finish in fifth place.

== Schedule ==
| Date | Time | Opponent | Site | TV | Result | Attendance |
|---|---|---|---|---|---|---|
| September 21 | 1:00 p.m. | at No. 20 Delaware* | Delaware Stadium; Newark, DE | YouTube | L 27–28 | 11,782 |
| September 28 | 3:30 p.m. | at Lafayette* | Fisher Stadium; Easton, PA | LSN | W 28–24 | 4,911 |
| October 4 | 7:00 p.m. | Dartmouth | Franklin Field; Philadelphia, PA | ESPNU | L 15–28 | 8,257 |
| October 12 | 1:00 p.m. | Sacred Heart* | Franklin Field; Philadelphia, PA | ESPN+ | W 38–24 | 6,033 |
| October 19 | 1:30 p.m. | at Columbia | Robert K. Kraft Field at Lawrence A. Wien Stadium; New York, NY | ESPN+/SNY | L 6–44 | 10,452 |
| October 26 | Noon | at Yale | Yale Bowl; New Haven, CT | ESPN+/NESN | L 41–46 | 4,990 |
| November 2 | 1:00 p.m. | Brown | Franklin Field; Philadelphia, PA | ESPN+ | W 38–36 | 8,459 |
| November 9 | 1:30 p.m. | Cornell | Franklin Field; Philadelphia, PA (rivalry) | ESPN+ | W 21–20 | 11,487 |
| November 16 | Noon | at Harvard | Harvard Stadium; Boston, MA (rivalry) | ESPN+ | W 24–20 | 8,113 |
| November 23 | 1:00 p.m. | Princeton | Franklin Field; Philadelphia, PA (rivalry) | ESPN+ | L 7–28 | 7,898 |
*Non-conference game; Rankings from STATS Poll released prior to the game; All times are in Eastern time

== Game summaries ==
=== At Delaware ===
| | 1 | 2 | 3 | 4 | Total |
|---|---|---|---|---|---|
| Quakers | 7 | 7 | 7 | 6 | 27 |
| No. 20 Fightin' Blue Hens | 7 | 0 | 14 | 7 | 28 |

=== At Lafayette ===
| | 1 | 2 | 3 | 4 | Total |
|---|---|---|---|---|---|
| Quakers | 0 | 14 | 0 | 14 | 28 |
| Leopards | 3 | 7 | 0 | 14 | 24 |

=== Dartmouth ===
| | 1 | 2 | 3 | 4 | Total |
|---|---|---|---|---|---|
| Big Green | 14 | 7 | 0 | 7 | 28 |
| Quakers | 0 | 7 | 0 | 8 | 15 |

=== Sacred Heart ===
| | 1 | 2 | 3 | 4 | Total |
|---|---|---|---|---|---|
| Pioneers | 0 | 10 | 7 | 7 | 24 |
| Quakers | 14 | 10 | 0 | 14 | 38 |

=== At Columbia ===
| | 1 | 2 | 3 | 4 | Total |
|---|---|---|---|---|---|
| Quakers | 0 | 0 | 0 | 6 | 6 |
| Lions | 10 | 7 | 13 | 14 | 44 |

=== At Yale ===
| | 1 | 2 | 3 | 4 | Total |
|---|---|---|---|---|---|
| Quakers | 0 | 13 | 14 | 14 | 41 |
| Bulldogs | 7 | 6 | 13 | 20 | 46 |

=== Brown ===
| | 1 | 2 | 3 | 4 | Total |
|---|---|---|---|---|---|
| Bears | 7 | 12 | 3 | 14 | 36 |
| Quakers | 0 | 21 | 14 | 3 | 38 |

=== Cornell ===
| | 1 | 2 | 3 | 4 | Total |
|---|---|---|---|---|---|
| Big Red | 0 | 7 | 7 | 6 | 20 |
| Quakers | 0 | 7 | 7 | 7 | 21 |

=== At Harvard ===
| | 1 | 2 | 3 | 4 | Total |
|---|---|---|---|---|---|
| Quakers | 7 | 3 | 7 | 7 | 24 |
| Crimson | 7 | 6 | 7 | 0 | 20 |

=== Princeton ===
| | 1 | 2 | 3 | 4 | Total |
|---|---|---|---|---|---|
| Tigers | 7 | 3 | 10 | 8 | 28 |
| Quakers | 7 | 0 | 0 | 0 | 7 |
