= 2019 Georgetown Hoyas football team =

American college football season

2019 Georgetown Hoyas football
- Conference: Patriot League
- Record: 5–6 (1–5 Patriot)
- Head coach: Rob Sgarlata (6th season)
- Offensive coordinator: Rob Spence (2nd season)
- Defensive coordinator: Kevin Doherty (3rd season)
- Home stadium: Cooper Field

Uniform
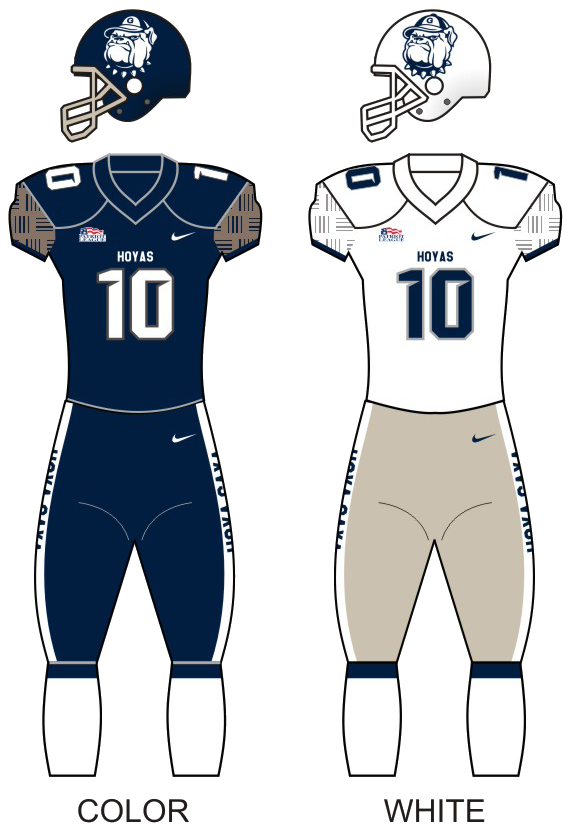

2019 Patriot League football standings
	Conf.			Overall
Team	W		L	W		L
Holy Cross $^	5	–	1	7	–	5
Lafayette	4	–	2	4	–	8
Bucknell	3	–	3	3	–	8
Lehigh	3	–	3	4	–	7
Colgate	3	–	3	4	–	8
Fordham	2	–	4	4	–	8
Georgetown	1	–	5	5	–	6
$ – Conference champion; ^ – FCS playoff participant

The 2019 Georgetown Hoyas football team represented Georgetown University as a member of the Patriot League during the 2019 NCAA Division I FCS football season. Led by sixth-year head coach Rob Sgarlata, the Hoyas compiled an overall record of 5–6 with a mark of 1–5 in conference play, placing last out of seven teams in the Patriot League. Georgetown played home games at Cooper Field in Washington, D.C.

== Preseason ==
=== Preseason coaches' poll ===
The Patriot League released their preseason coaches' poll on July 30, 2019 (voting was by conference head coaches and sports information directors). The Hoyas were picked to finish in third place.

=== Preseason All-Patriot League team ===
The Hoyas had seven players selected to the preseason All-Patriot League team.

Offense

Isaac Schley – FB

Michael Dereus – WR

Defense

Duval Paul – DL

Khristian Tate – DL

Wes Bowers – LB

Ahmad Wilson – DB

Special teams

Ahmad Wilson – ATH

== Schedule ==
Date	Time	Opponent	Site	TV	Result	Attendance
August 31	1:00 p.m.	at Davidson*	Richardson Stadium; Davidson, NC	Davidson All Access	L 20–27	5,367
September 7	12:30 p.m.	Marist*	Cooper Field; Washington, DC	Stadium	W 43–3	1,943
September 14	12:00 p.m.	Catholic University*	Cooper Field; Washington, DC (Steven Dean Memorial Trophy)	DCW50/Stadium	W 69–0	1,969
September 28	1:00 p.m.	at Columbia*	Robert K. Kraft Field at Lawrence A. Wien Stadium; New York, NY (Lou Little Trophy)	ESPN+	W 24–10	4,311
October 5	3:00 p.m.	at Cornell*	Schoellkopf Field; Ithaca, NY	ESPN+	W 14–8	8,745
October 12	2:00 p.m.	Fordham^{†}	Cooper Field; Washington, DC	DCW50/Stadium	L 27–30	1,993
October 19	12:00 p.m.	Lafayette	Cooper Field; Washington, DC	Stadium	W 14–10	1,984
October 26	12:30 p.m.	at Lehigh	Goodman Stadium; Bethlehem, PA	Stadium	L 24–27	7,031
November 2	12:00 p.m.	Colgate	Cooper Field; Washington, DC	DCW50/Stadium	L 14–24	1,914
November 16	1:00 p.m.	at Bucknell	Christy Mathewson–Memorial Stadium; Lewisburg, PA	Stadium	L 17–20	1,563
November 23	12:00 p.m.	at Holy Cross	Fitton Field; Worcester, MA	Stadium	L 0–24	7,152
*Non-conference game; ^{†}Homecoming; All times are in Eastern time

== Game summaries ==
=== At Davidson ===
	1	2	3	4	Total
Hoyas	0	0	20	0	20
Wildcats	7	13	0	7	27

=== Marist ===
	1	2	3	4	Total
Red Foxes	0	3	0	0	3
Hoyas	7	15	21	0	43

=== Catholic University ===
	1	2	3	4	Total
Cardinals	0	0	0	0	0
Hoyas	18	35	3	13	69

=== At Columbia ===
	1	2	3	4	Total
Hoyas	0	7	10	7	24
Lions	7	0	0	3	10

=== At Cornell ===
	1	2	3	4	Total
Hoyas	8	0	0	6	14
Big Red	0	0	8	0	8

=== Fordham ===
	1	2	3	4	Total
Rams	6	10	7	7	30
Hoyas	8	7	6	6	27

=== Lafayette ===
	1	2	3	4	Total
Leopards	7	3	0	0	10
Hoyas	7	7	0	0	14

=== At Lehigh ===
	1	2	3	4	Total
Hoyas	0	3	13	8	24
Mountain Hawks	10	0	7	10	27

=== Colgate ===
	1	2	3	4	Total
Raiders	0	7	10	7	24
Hoyas	0	7	0	7	14

=== At Bucknell ===
	1	2	3	4	Total
Hoyas	7	3	7	0	17
Bison	6	0	0	14	20

=== At Holy Cross ===
	1	2	3	4	Total
Hoyas	0	0	0	0	0
Crusaders	0	14	0	10	24
