= 2019 Fordham Rams football team =

American college football season

2019 Fordham Rams football
- Conference: Patriot League
- Record: 4–8 (2–4 Patriot)
- Head coach: Joe Conlin (2nd season)
- Offensive coordinator: Kevin Decker (1st season)
- Defensive coordinator: Paul Rice (2nd season)
- Home stadium: Coffey Field

Uniform
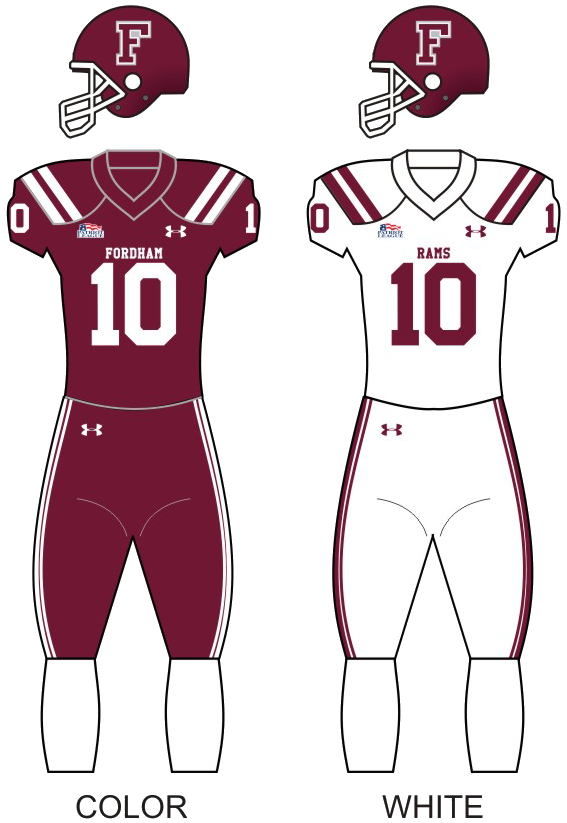

2019 Patriot League football standings
	Conf.			Overall
Team	W		L	W		L
Holy Cross $^	5	–	1	7	–	5
Lafayette	4	–	2	4	–	8
Bucknell	3	–	3	3	–	8
Lehigh	3	–	3	4	–	7
Colgate	3	–	3	4	–	8
Fordham	2	–	4	4	–	8
Georgetown	1	–	5	5	–	6
$ – Conference champion; ^ – FCS playoff participant

The 2019 Fordham Rams football team represented Fordham University as a member of the Patriot League during the 2019 NCAA Division I FCS football season. Led by second-year head coach Joe Conlin, the Rams compiled an overall record of 4–8 with a mark of 2–4 in conference play, placing sixth in the Patriot League. Fordham played home games at Coffey Field in The Bronx.

== Preseason ==
=== Preseason coaches' poll ===
The Patriot League released their preseason coaches' poll on July 30, 2019 (voting was by conference head coaches and sports information directors). The Rams were picked to finish in fourth place.

=== Preseason All-Patriot League team ===
The Rams had two players selected to the preseason All-Patriot League team.

Defense

Glenn Cunningham – LB

Jesse Bramble – DB

== Schedule ==
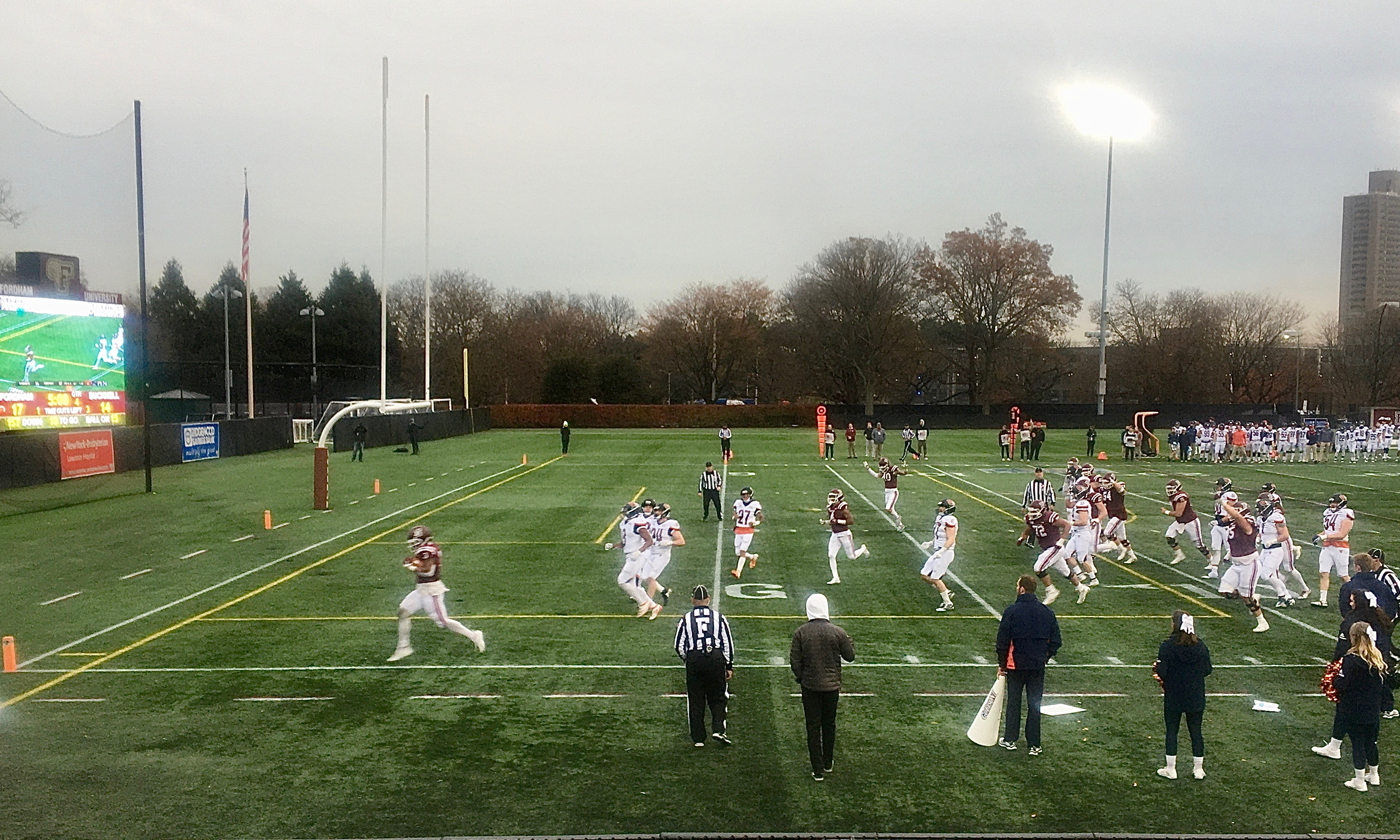
Fordham vs. Bucknell, played on November 23

Date	Time	Opponent	Site	TV	Result	Attendance
August 31	6:00 p.m.	Central Connecticut*	Coffey Field; Bronx, NY	Stadium	L 23–26	2,988
September 7	2:00 p.m.	at Ball State*	Scheumann Stadium; Muncie, IN	ESPN3	L 29–57	10,123
September 14	1:00 p.m.	at Bryant*	Beirne Stadium; Smithfield, RI	NEC Front Row	W 29–14	1,362
September 21	6:00 p.m.	at Stony Brook*	Kenneth P. LaValle Stadium; Stony Brook, NY	FloSports	L 10–45	6,204
September 28	1:00 p.m.	Richmond*	Coffey Field; Bronx, NY	Stadium	W 23–16	5,578
October 5	1:00 p.m.	at Yale*	Yale Bowl; New Haven, CT	ESPN+	L 24–48	5,743
October 12	2:00 p.m.	at Georgetown	Cooper Field; Washington, DC	Stadium	W 30–27	1,993
October 19	1:00 p.m.	Lehigh	Coffey Field; Bronx, NY	Stadium	L 27–30 ^{OT}	2,766
November 2	12:30 p.m.	at Lafayette	Fisher Stadium; Easton, PA	Stadium	L 34–38	3,505
November 9	1:00 p.m.	at Colgate	Crown Field at Andy Kerr Stadium; Hamilton, NY	Stadium	L 13–24	1,406
November 16	1:00 p.m.	Holy Cross^{†}	Coffey Field; Bronx, NY (Ram–Crusader Cup)	Stadium	L 27–49	3,704
November 23	1:00 p.m.	Bucknell	Coffey Field; Bronx, NY	Stadium	W 31–14	2,006
*Non-conference game; ^{†}Homecoming; All times are in Eastern time

== Game summaries ==
=== Central Connecticut ===
	1	2	3	4	Total
Blue Devils	8	7	0	11	26
Rams	0	6	10	7	23

=== At Ball State ===
	1	2	3	4	Total
Rams	14	0	15	0	29
Cardinals	14	14	22	7	57

=== At Bryant ===
	1	2	3	4	Total
Rams	0	6	0	23	29
Bulldogs	7	0	7	0	14

=== At Stony Brook ===
	1	2	3	4	Total
Rams	0	3	0	7	10
Seawolves	10	21	0	14	45

=== Richmond ===
	1	2	3	4	Total
Spiders	3	7	3	3	16
Rams	0	10	13	0	23

=== At Yale ===
	1	2	3	4	Total
Rams	7	3	0	14	24
Bulldogs	17	28	0	3	48

=== At Georgetown ===
	1	2	3	4	Total
Rams	6	10	7	7	30
Hoyas	8	7	6	6	27

=== Lehigh ===
	1	2	3	4	OT	Total
Mountain Hawks	7	7	3	7	6	30
Rams	0	10	7	7	3	27

=== At Lafayette ===
	1	2	3	4	Total
Rams	0	7	10	17	34
Leopards	17	7	7	7	38

=== At Colgate ===
	1	2	3	4	Total
Rams	3	7	3	0	13
Raiders	7	7	7	3	24

=== Holy Cross ===
	1	2	3	4	Total
Crusaders	0	0	14	35	49
Rams	0	14	0	13	27

=== Bucknell ===
	1	2	3	4	Total
Bison	0	14	0	0	14
Rams	7	3	7	14	31
