= 2019 Cornell Big Red football team =

Football season

2019 Cornell Big Red football

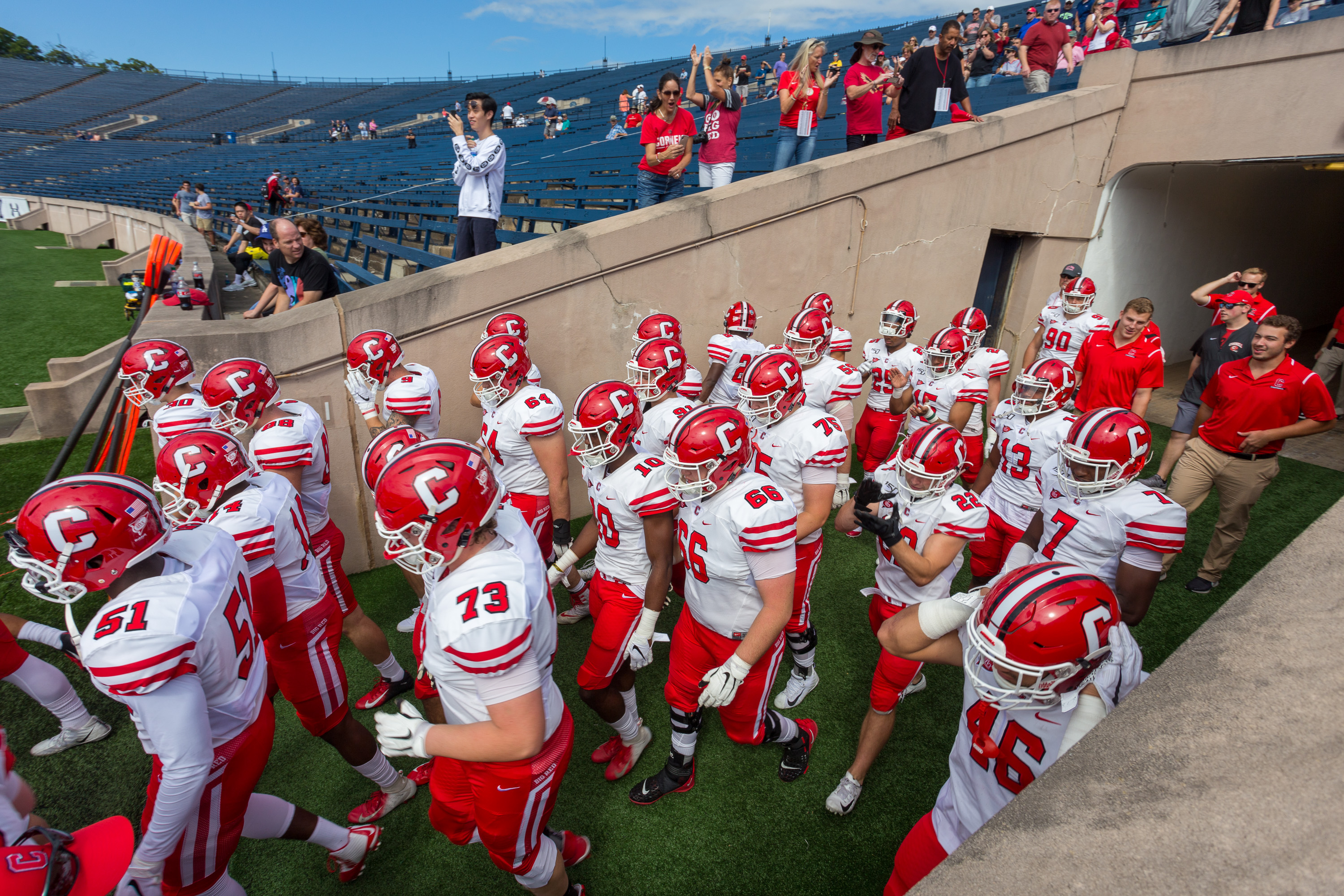
- Big Red enters Yale Bowl on September 28
- Conference: Ivy League
- Record: 4–6 (3–4 Ivy)
- Head coach: David Archer (7th season)
- Offensive coordinator: Joe Villapiano (3rd season)
- Defensive coordinator: Jared Backus (7th season)
- Captains: George L. Holm III; Jelani Taylor
- Home stadium: Schoellkopf Field

Uniform
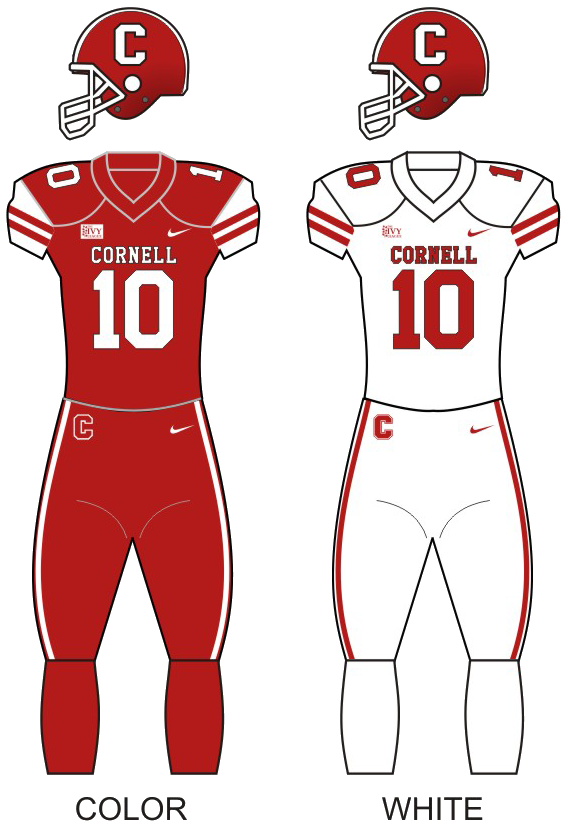

2019 Ivy League football standings
	Conf.			Overall
Team	W		L	W		L
No. 22 Dartmouth +	6	–	1	9	–	1
No. 25 Yale +	6	–	1	9	–	1
Princeton	5	–	2	8	–	2
Penn	3	–	4	5	–	5
Cornell	3	–	4	4	–	6
Harvard	2	–	5	4	–	6
Columbia	2	–	5	3	–	7
Brown	1	–	6	2	–	8
+ – Conference co-champions; Rankings from STATS Poll

The 2019 Cornell Big Red football team represented Cornell University in the 2019 NCAA Division I FCS football season as a member of the Ivy League. They were led by seventh-year head coach David Archer and played their home games at Schoellkopf Field. They finished the season 4–6 overall and 3–4 in Ivy League play to tie for fourth place. Cornell averaged 4,295 fans per game in 2019.

== Preseason ==
=== Preseason media poll ===
The Ivy League released their preseason media poll on August 8, 2019. The Big Red were picked to finish in seventh place.

== Schedule ==
Date	Time	Opponent	Site	TV	Result	Attendance
September 21	12:00 p.m.	at Marist*	Tenney Stadium at Leonidoff Field; Poughkeepsie, NY	RFN	W 21–7	2,157
September 28	1:00 p.m.	at Yale	Yale Bowl; New Haven, CT	ESPN+	L 16–27	5,723
October 5	3:00 p.m.	Georgetown*^{†}	Schoellkopf Field; Ithaca, NY	ESPN+	L 8–14	8,745
October 12	1:00 p.m.	at Harvard	Harvard Stadium; Boston, MA	ESPN+	L 22–35	7,513
October 19	1:30 p.m.	Colgate*	Schoellkopf Field; Ithaca, NY (rivalry)	ESPN+	L 20–21	2,970
October 26	1:30 p.m.	Brown	Schoellkopf Field; Ithaca, NY	ESPN+	W 37–35	4,271
November 1	6:00 p.m.	No. 12 Princeton	Schoellkopf Field; Ithaca, NY	ESPNU	L 7-21	1,745
November 9	1:30 p.m.	at Penn	Franklin Field; Philadelphia, PA (rivalry)	ESPN+	L 20–21	11,487
November 16	1:30 p.m.	at No. 11 Dartmouth	Memorial Field; Hanover, NH (rivalry)	ESPN+	W 20–17	3,245
November 23	1:30 p.m.	Columbia	Schoellkopf Field; Ithaca, NY (Empire State Bowl)	ESPN+	W 35–9	3,744
*Non-conference game; ^{†}Homecoming; Rankings from STATS Poll released prior to the game; All times are in Eastern time

== Game summaries ==
=== At Marist ===
	1	2	3	4	Total
Big Red	7	7	7	0	21
Red Foxes	0	7	0	0	7

=== At Yale ===
	1	2	3	4	Total
Big Red	0	3	7	6	16
Bulldogs	3	0	7	17	27

=== Georgetown ===
	1	2	3	4	Total
Hoyas	8	0	0	6	14
Big Red	0	0	8	0	8

=== At Harvard ===
	1	2	3	4	Total
Big Red	7	3	0	12	22
Crimson	7	21	0	7	35

=== Colgate ===
	1	2	3	4	Total
Raiders	0	14	7	0	21
Big Red	3	7	7	3	20

=== Brown ===
	1	2	3	4	Total
Bears	6	6	13	10	35
Big Red	6	14	14	3	37

=== Princeton ===
	1	2	3	4	Total
No. 12 Tigers	0	14	7	0	21
Big Red	0	0	7	0	7

=== At Penn ===
	1	2	3	4	Total
Big Red	0	7	7	6	20
Quakers	0	7	7	7	21

=== At Dartmouth ===
	1	2	3	4	Total
Big Red	3	3	6	8	20
No. 11 Big Green	7	7	0	3	17

=== Columbia ===
	1	2	3	4	Total
Lions	0	9	0	0	9
Big Red	7	14	14	0	35
