= Nevelle Clarke =

American football player (born 1996)

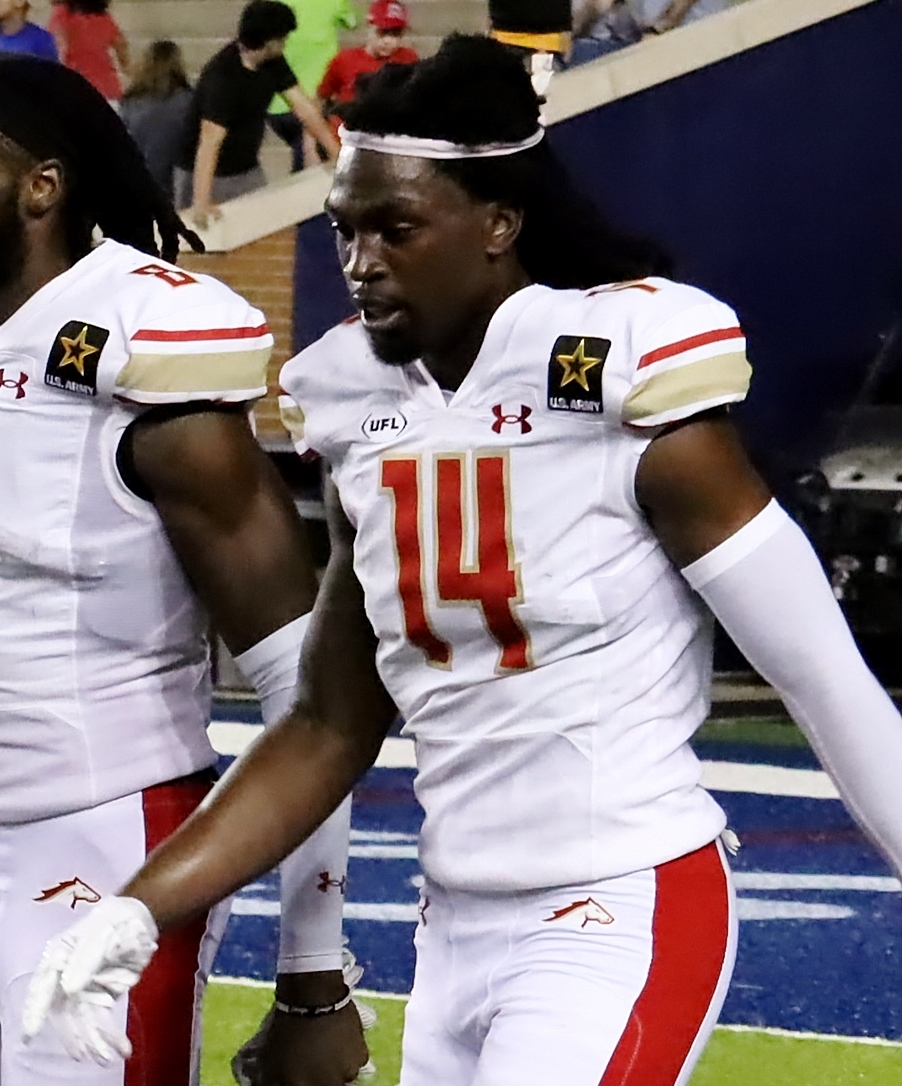
- Clarke with the Birmingham Stallions in 2024

No. 14 – St. Louis Battlehawks
- Position: Cornerback
- Roster status: Active

Personal information
- Born: November 16, 1996 (age 29); Miami, Florida, U.S.
- Listed height: 6 ft 1 in (1.85 m)
- Listed weight: 194 lb (88 kg)

Career information
- High school: J. P. Taravella (Miami)
- College: UCF
- NFL draft: 2020: undrafted

Career history
- Minnesota Vikings (2020)*; New Orleans Breakers (2022–2023); Pittsburgh Steelers (2023)*; Birmingham Stallions (2024–2025); St. Louis Battlehawks (2026–present)
- * Offseason or practice squad member only

Awards and highlights
- UFL champion (2024); Colley Matrix national champion (2017); First-team All-AAC (2018)
- Stats at Pro Football Reference

Nevelle Clarke (born November 16, 1996) is an American professional football cornerback for the St. Louis Battlehawks of the United Football League (UFL). He played college football at UCF. He signed with the Minnesota Vikings as an undrafted free agent in 2020.

== Early life ==
Clarke played wide receiver, cornerback, safety, and returner at J. P. Taravella High School.

== College career ==
As a redshirt freshman, Clarke was named to the 2016–17 American All-Academic Team after recording fifteen tackles and two pass breakups.

In his redshirt junior season, he was named to the All-ACC First-team after recording forty-six total tackles, thirteen pass breakups, and two interceptions.

On January 9, 2019, Clark announced he would stay at UCF for his senior season.

Clarke played in the 2020 East–West Shrine Bowl on January 18, 2020.

== Professional career ==
Pre-draft measurables
Height	Weight	Arm length	Hand span	Wingspan	20-yard shuttle	Three-cone drill	Vertical jump	Broad jump	Bench press
6 ft 0 7/8 in (1.85 m)	190 lb (86 kg)	31 5/8 in (0.80 m)	9 1/8 in (0.23 m)	6 ft 4 in (1.93 m)	4.31 s	6.88 s	35.0 in (0.89 m)	10 ft 6 in (3.20 m)	10 reps
All values from NFL Combine

=== Minnesota Vikings ===
Clarke signed with the Minnesota Vikings as an undrafted free agent on April 27, 2020. He was placed on the active/non-football injury list at the start of training camp on July 28, and moved back to the active roster three days later. Clarke was waived by the Vikings during final roster cuts on September 5.

=== New Orleans Breakers ===
Clarke signed with the New Orleans Breakers of the United States Football League on April 1, 2022. He was transferred to the team's inactive roster on May 12 with a hamstring injury. Clarke was released from his contract on August 14, 2023, to sign with an NFL team.

=== Pittsburgh Steelers ===
Clarke signed with the Pittsburgh Steelers on August 15, 2023. On August 26, Clarke was released by the Steelers.

=== Birmingham Stallions ===
Clarke signed with the Birmingham Stallions of the USFL on November 2, 2023. He re-signed with the team on August 27, 2024. Davis was re-signed by Birmingham on May 19, 2025.

=== St. Louis Battlehawks ===
Clarke was drafted by the St. Louis Battlehawks as part of the 2026 UFL draft.

== Personal life ==
Clarke was born in Miami, Florida, to Norman Clarke and Regina Boston.
