= 2020 East–West Shrine Bowl =

- All–Star Bowl Game
East Team	West Team
31	27
Head coach: Mike Caldwell (Tampa Bay Buccaneers)	Head coach: Ben Steele (Atlanta Falcons)
	1	2	3	4	Total
East	14	3	0	14	31
West	7	3	7	10	27
- Date: January 18, 2020
- Season: 2019
- Stadium: Tropicana Field
- Location: St. Petersburg, Florida
- MVP: Benny LeMay (RB, Charlotte) & Luther Kirk (S, Illinois State)

United States TV coverage
- Network: NFL Network & SB Nation Radio

The 2020 East–West Shrine Bowl was the 95th staging of the all–star college football exhibition to benefit Shriners Hospital for Children. The game was played at Tropicana Field in St. Petersburg, Florida, on January 18, 2020, with a 3:00 p.m. EST kickoff, televised on the NFL Network. It was one of the final 2019–20 bowl games concluding the 2019 FBS football season. The game featured NCAA players (predominantly from the Football Bowl Subdivision) and a few select invitees from Canadian university football, rostered into "East" and "West" teams. This was the first playing to be called the East–West Shrine Bowl, as prior editions had been the East–West Shrine Game.

The game featured more than 100 players from the 2019 NCAA Division I FBS football season and prospects for the 2020 draft of the professional National Football League (NFL). In the week prior to the game, NFL scouts and agents attended team practices. Coaches and game officials were supplied by the NFL.

The day before the game, the event's Pat Tillman Award was presented to James Morgan, quarterback of the FIU Panthers—the award is "presented to a player who best exemplifies character, intelligence, sportsmanship and service. The award is about a student-athlete's achievements and conduct, both on and off the field."

== Coaching staffs ==
Head coaches were announced on January 8, 2020, as Mike Caldwell of the Tampa Bay Buccaneers and Ben Steele of the Atlanta Falcons, responsible for the East and West squads, respectively.

== Players ==
Players who accept invitations to the game are listed on the official website. Notable and selected players are listed in this section.

=== East team ===
No.	Pos.	Player	College	2019 season bowl game	Notes
41	CB	Nevelle Clarke	UCF	Gasparilla	
11	QB	Kevin Davidson	Princeton	n/a (FCS)	6/11 passing, 52 yards; 2 carries, –4 yards
35	RB	Rico Dowdle	South Carolina	none	5 carries, 50 yards; 1 reception, 2 yards
22	RB	Tavien Feaster	South Carolina	none	inactive
24	CB	Lavert Hill	Michigan	Citrus	
26	RB	Adrian Killins	UCF	Gasparilla	7 receptions, 91 yards; 1 carry, 0 yards
13	WR	Mason Kinsey	Berry	n/a (D-III)	2 receptions, 15 yards
32	RB	Benny LeMay	Charlotte	Bahamas	16 carries, 80 yards, 2 TD; Offensive MVP
12	QB	James Morgan	FIU	none	9/14 passing, 116 yards, 1 TD
10	WR	Malcolm Perry	Navy	Liberty	1 carry, 52 yards, 1 TD
56	LB	Michael Pinckney	Miami (FL)	Independence	
55	LB	Shaquille Quarterman	Miami (FL)	Independence	
4	K	Cooper Rothe	Wyoming	Arizona	4/4 XP, 1/1 FG
7	QB	Tommy Stevens	Mississippi State	Music City	7/9 passing, 101 yards, 1 INT; 1 carry, 12 yards
3	P	Tommy Townsend	Florida	Orange	4 punts, 39.8 average; 47 long

=== West team ===
No.	Pos.	Player	College	2019 season bowl game	Notes
22	RB	LaVante Bellamy	Western Michigan	First Responder	5 carries, 12 yards; 2 receptions, 12 yards
7	QB	Kelly Bryant	Missouri	none	8/13 passing, 103 yards; 1 carry, –9 yards
26	RB	Reggie Corbin	Illinois	Redbox	5 carries, 32 yards; 1 reception, 5 yards
24	S	Marc-Antoine Dequoy	Montreal	(Canada)	
2	K	Dominik Eberle	Utah State	Frisco	3/3 XP, 2/2 FG
6	QB	Mason Fine	North Texas	none	4/6 passing, 66 yards, 1 TD; 1 carry, 2 yards
1	QB	Tyler Huntley	Utah	Alamo	6/8 passing, 47 yards, 1 TD; 7 carries, 45 yards
30	RB	Tony Jones Jr.	Notre Dame	Camping World	7 carries, 5 yards
34	S	Luther Kirk	Illinois State	n/a (FCS)	INT w/ 9-yard return; Defensive MVP
64	OT	Carter O'Donnell	Alberta	(Canada)	
11	P	Alex Pechin	Bucknell	n/a (FCS)	5 punts, 41.4 average, 48 long
25	RB	James Robinson	Illinois State	n/a (FCS)	7 carries, 80 yards, 1 TD; 2 receptions, 56 yards
54	OT	Calvin Throckmorton	Oregon	Rose	

== Game summary ==
2020 East–West Shrine Bowl

Quarter	1	2	3	4	Total
East	14	3	0	14	31
West	7	3	7	10	27

at Tropicana Field • St. Petersburg, Florida

- Date: Saturday, January 18, 2020
- Game time: 3:30 p.m. EST
- TV: NFL Network
- ESPN game summary

Game information

First Quarter

- (10:59) EAST – Ja'Marcus Bradley 9-yard pass from James Morgan, Cooper Rothe kick good (Drive: 10 plays, 77 yards, 4:01, EAST 7–0)
- (5:06) EAST – Benny LeMay 10-yard run, Cooper Rothe kick good (Drive: 7 plays, 77 yards, 4:25, EAST 14–0)
- (1:46) WEST – Parker Houston 7-yard pass from Tyler Huntley, Dominik Eberle kick good (Drive: 7 plays, 75 yards, 3:20, EAST 14–7)

Second Quarter

- (11:56) EAST – Cooper Rothe 26-yard field goal (Drive: 9 plays, 66 yards, 4:50, EAST 17–7)
- (7:08) WEST – Dominik Eberle 28-yard field goal (Drive: plays, 65 yards, 4:48, EAST 17–10)

Third Quarter

- (6:11) WEST – Binjimen Victor 36-yard pass from Mason Fine, Dominik Eberle kick good (Drive: 4 plays, 46 yards, 2:27, TIED 17–17)

Fourth Quarter

- (13:37) WEST – Dominik Eberle 26-yard field goal (Drive: 10 plays, 58 yards, 5:26, WEST 20–17)
- (10:39) EAST – Malcolm Perry 52-yard run, Cooper Rothe kick good (Drive: 1 play, 52 yards, 0:09, EAST 24–20)
- (7:55) WEST – James Robinson 63-yard run, Dominik Eberle kick good (Drive: 5 plays, 75 yards, 2:44, WEST 27–24)
- (1:52) EAST – Benny LeMay 9-yard run, Cooper Rothe kick good (Drive: 8 plays, 82 yards, 2:33, EAST 31–27)

=== Statistics ===
Statistics	EAST	WEST
First downs	24	20
Total yards	458	395
Rushes–yards	27–189	34–179
Passing yards	269	216
Passing: Comp–Att–Int	27–35–1	18–27–0
Time of possession	27:33	32:27

Team	Category	Player	Statistics
East	Passing	James Morgan (FIU)	9/14, 116 yards, 1 TD
East	Rushing	Benny LeMay (Charlotte)	16 carries, 80 yards, 2 TD
East	Receiving	Adrian Killins (UCF)	7 receptions, 91 yards
West	Passing	Kelly Bryant (Missouri)	8/13, 103 yards
West	Rushing	James Robinson (Illinois St.)	7 carries, 80 yards, 1 TD
West	Receiving	James Robinson (Illinois St.)	2 receptions, 56 yards

== See also ==
- 2020 NFL draft
