= 2019 Lehigh Mountain Hawks football team =

American college football season

2019 Lehigh Mountain Hawks football
- Conference: Patriot League
- Record: 4–7 (3–3 Patriot)
- Head coach: Tom Gilmore (1st season)
- Offensive coordinator: Scott Brisson (3rd season)
- Defensive coordinator: Mike Kashurba (1st season)
- Home stadium: Goodman Stadium

Uniform
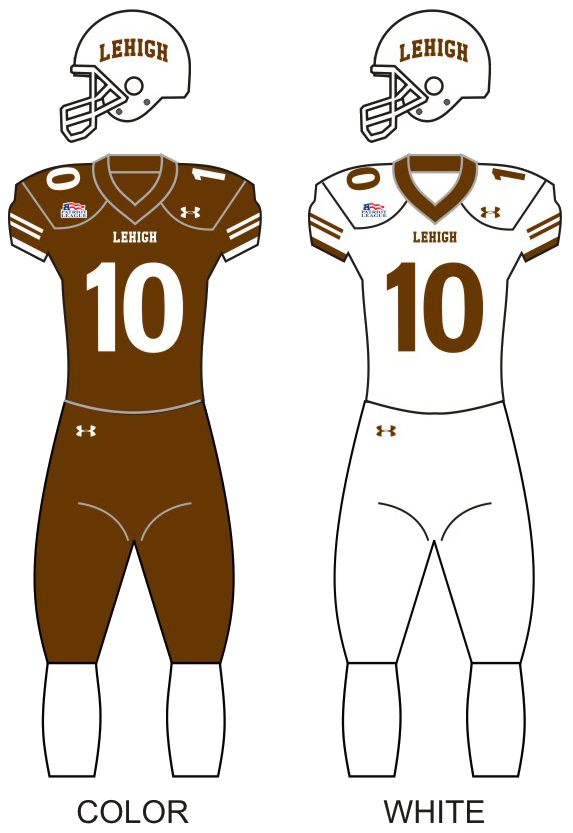

2019 Patriot League football standings
	Conf.			Overall
Team	W		L	W		L
Holy Cross $^	5	–	1	7	–	5
Lafayette	4	–	2	4	–	8
Bucknell	3	–	3	3	–	8
Lehigh	3	–	3	4	–	7
Colgate	3	–	3	4	–	8
Fordham	2	–	4	4	–	8
Georgetown	1	–	5	5	–	6
$ – Conference champion; ^ – FCS playoff participant

The 2019 Lehigh Mountain Hawks football team represented Lehigh University as a member of the Patriot League during the 2019 NCAA Division I FCS football season. Led by first-year head coach Tom Gilmore, the Mountain Hawks compiled an overall record of 4–7 with a mark of 3–3 in conference play, placing in a three-way tie for third in the Patriot League. Lehigh played home games at Goodman Stadium in Bethlehem, Pennsylvania.

== Preseason ==
=== Preseason coaches' poll ===
The Patriot League released their preseason coaches' poll on July 30, 2019 (voting was by conference head coaches and sports information directors). The Mountain Hawks were picked to finish in fifth place.

=== Preseason All-Patriot League team ===
The Mountain Hawks had one player selected to the preseason All-Patriot League team.

Offense

Jorge Portorreal – WR

== Schedule ==
Date	Time	Opponent	Site	TV	Result	Attendance
August 31	12:30 p.m.	Saint Francis (PA)*	Goodman Stadium; Bethlehem, PA	Stadium, SE2	L 13–14	4,161
September 7	6:00 p.m.	at No. 24 Villanova*	Villanova Stadium; Villanova, PA	FloSports	L 10–38	8,319
September 14	10:00 p.m.	at No. 5 UC Davis*	UC Davis Health Stadium; Davis, CA	Pluto TV	L 13–41	9,908
September 28	12:30 p.m.	Merrimack*	Goodman Stadium; Bethlehem, PA	Stadium/SE2	W 10–3	4,511
October 5	1:00 p.m.	at Colgate	Crown Field at Andy Kerr Stadium; Hamilton, NY	Stadium	W 21–14	3,853
October 19	1:00 p.m.	at Fordham	Coffey Field; Bronx, NY	Stadium	W 30–27 ^{OT}	2,766
October 26	12:30 p.m.	Georgetown	Goodman Stadium; Bethlehem, PA	Stadium/SE2	W 27–24	7,031
November 2	12:30 p.m.	Holy Cross	Goodman Stadium; Bethlehem, PA	Stadium	L 17–24	4,545
November 9	1:00 p.m.	at Bucknell	Christy Mathewson–Memorial Stadium; Lewisburg, PA	Stadium	L 10–20	2,051
November 16	12:00 p.m.	at Sacred Heart*	Campus Field; Fairfield, CT	NEC Front Row	L 6–13	1,927
November 23	12:30 p.m.	Lafayette	Goodman Stadium; Bethlehem, PA (The Rivalry)	Stadium, WFMZ	L 16–17	13,292
*Non-conference game; Rankings from STATS Poll released prior to the game; All times are in Eastern time

== Game summaries ==
=== Saint Francis (PA) ===
	1	2	3	4	Total
Red Flash	0	0	7	7	14
Mountain Hawks	10	3	0	0	13

=== At Villanova ===
	1	2	3	4	Total
Mountain Hawks	0	3	7	0	10
No. 24 Wildcats	0	17	14	7	38

=== At UC Davis ===
	1	2	3	4	Total
Mountain Hawks	0	0	0	13	13
No. 5 Aggies	14	7	13	7	41

=== Merrimack ===
	1	2	3	4	Total
Warriors	0	3	0	0	3
Mountain Hawks	0	0	3	7	10

=== At Colgate ===
	1	2	3	4	Total
Mountain Hawks	0	14	0	7	21
Raiders	7	7	0	0	14

=== At Fordham ===
	1	2	3	4	OT	Total
Mountain Hawks	7	7	3	7	6	30
Rams	0	10	7	7	3	27

=== Georgetown ===
	1	2	3	4	Total
Hoyas	0	3	13	8	24
Mountain Hawks	10	0	7	10	27

=== Holy Cross ===
	1	2	3	4	Total
Crusaders	7	10	7	0	24
Mountain Hawks	0	7	7	3	17

=== At Bucknell ===
	1	2	3	4	Total
Mountain Hawks	0	3	0	7	10
Bison	0	10	7	3	20

=== At Sacred Heart ===
	1	2	3	4	Total
Mountain Hawks	0	3	3	0	6
Pioneers	0	0	0	13	13

=== Lafayette ===
	1	2	3	4	Total
Leopards	7	0	7	3	17
Mountain Hawks	0	7	3	6	16
