= 2019 Brown Bears football team =

American college football season

2019 Brown Bears football
- Conference: Ivy League
- Record: 2–8 (1–6 Ivy)
- Head coach: James Perry (1st season)
- Offensive coordinator: Vinny Marino (1st season)
- Offensive scheme: Air raid
- Defensive coordinator: Tim Weaver (1st season)
- Base defense: 3–4
- Home stadium: Richard Gouse Field at Brown Stadium

Uniform
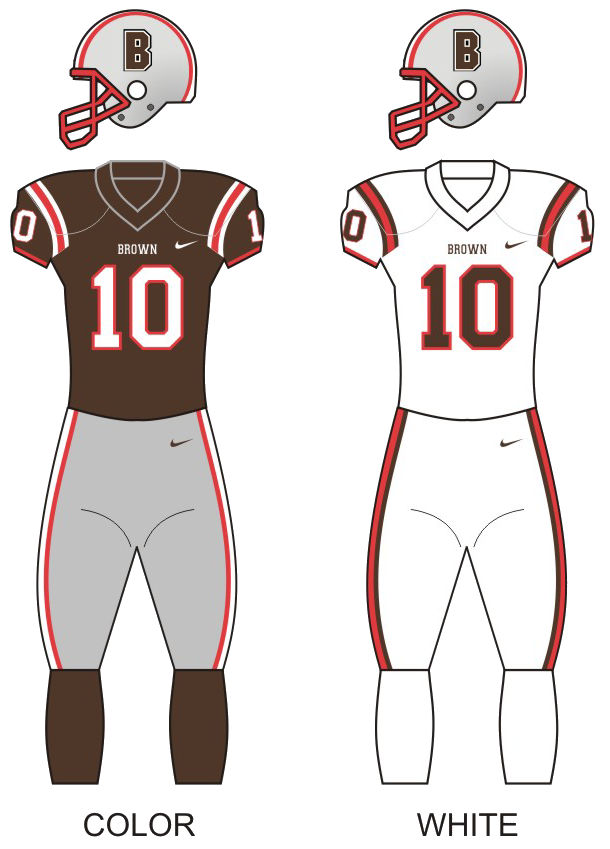

2019 Ivy League football standings
	Conf.			Overall
Team	W		L	W		L
No. 22 Dartmouth +	6	–	1	9	–	1
No. 25 Yale +	6	–	1	9	–	1
Princeton	5	–	2	8	–	2
Penn	3	–	4	5	–	5
Cornell	3	–	4	4	–	6
Harvard	2	–	5	4	–	6
Columbia	2	–	5	3	–	7
Brown	1	–	6	2	–	8
+ – Conference co-champions; Rankings from STATS Poll

The 2019 Brown Bears football team represented Brown University as a member of the Ivy League during the 2019 NCAA Division I FCS football season. Led by first-year head coach James Perry, the Bears compiled an overall record of 2–8 with a mark of 1–6 in conference play, placing last out of eight teams in the Ivy League. Brown played home games at Richard Gouse Field at Brown Stadium in Providence, Rhode Island.

== Preseason ==
=== Preseason media poll ===
The Ivy League released their preseason media poll on August 8, 2019. The Bears were picked to finish in eighth place.

== Schedule ==
Date	Time	Opponent	Site	TV	Result	Attendance
September 21	2:00 p.m.	at Bryant*	Beirne Stadium; Smithfield, RI	NEC Front Row	W 35–30	2,242
September 27	7:00 p.m.	at Harvard	Harvard Stadium; Boston, MA	ESPNews	L 7–42	10,088
October 5	12:30 p.m.	Rhode Island*	Richard Gouse Field at Brown Stadium; Providence, RI (rivalry)	ESPN+	L 28–31	5,077
October 12	12:30 p.m.	Holy Cross*	Brown Stadium; Providence, RI	ESPN+/NESN Plus	L 31–47	3,026
October 19	1:30 p.m.	No. 17 Princeton^{†}	Brown Stadium; Providence, RI	ESPN+	L 22–65	4,703
October 26	1:30 p.m.	at Cornell	Schoellkopf Field; Ithaca, NY	ESPN+	L 35–37	4,271
November 2	1:00 p.m.	at Penn	Franklin Field; Philadelphia, PA	ESPN+	L 36–38	8,459
November 9	12:30 p.m.	Yale	Brown Stadium; Providence, RI	ESPN+	L 35–59	2,876
November 16	1:00 p.m.	at Columbia	Robert K. Kraft Field at Lawrence A. Wien Stadium; New York, NY	ESPN+	W 48–24	4,207
November 23	12:30 p.m.	No. 22 Dartmouth	Brown Stadium; Providence, RI	ESPN+	L 23–29	3,264
*Non-conference game; ^{†}Homecoming; Rankings from STATS Poll released prior to the game; All times are in Eastern time

== Game summaries ==
=== At Bryant ===
	1	2	3	4	Total
Bears	0	14	7	14	35
Bulldogs	3	7	7	13	30

=== At Harvard ===
	1	2	3	4	Total
Bears	7	0	0	0	7
Crimson	7	14	7	14	42

=== Rhode Island ===
	1	2	3	4	Total
Rams	7	10	7	7	31
Bears	7	7	0	14	28

=== Holy Cross ===
	1	2	3	4	Total
Crusaders	13	14	7	13	47
Bears	7	10	7	7	31

=== Princeton ===
	1	2	3	4	Total
No. 17 Tigers	17	34	7	7	65
Bears	6	13	3	0	22

=== At Cornell ===
	1	2	3	4	Total
Bears	6	6	13	10	35
Big Red	6	14	14	3	37

=== At Penn ===
	1	2	3	4	Total
Bears	7	12	3	14	36
Quakers	0	21	14	3	38

=== Yale ===
	1	2	3	4	Total
Bulldogs	17	7	18	17	59
Bears	0	21	7	7	35

=== At Columbia ===
	1	2	3	4	Total
Bears	21	7	20	0	48
Lions	0	17	7	0	24

=== Dartmouth ===
	1	2	3	4	Total
No. 22 Big Green	0	7	7	15	29
Bears	3	7	13	0	23

== Roster ==
2019 Brown Bears football team roster
Players
Coaches
Offense

Pos.	#	Name	Class
OL	50	Donovan Allen	Fr
OL	68	Nicholas Allsop	Sr
OL	60	Tucker Barnes	Jr
WR	14	Jaelon Blandburg	Sr
RB	36	Andrew Bolton	Sr
WR	11	Scott Boylan	Jr
OL	13	Christopher Boyle	Fr
OL	70	Chad Broome-Webster	Jr
OL	46	Anthony Mastroni	Jr

Defense

Pos.	#	Name	Class
DB	1	BJ Ubani	Jr
DB	2	Victor Loolo	Sr
LB	47	Davis Bak	Jr
DL	96	Brooks Jones	Fr
DE	98	Tommy Maloney	Fr

Special teams

Pos.	#	Name	Class

Head coach

- James Perry

Coordinators/assistant coaches

Legend

- (C) Team captain
- (S) Suspended
- (I) Ineligible
- Injured
- Redshirt

Roster
