= Alex Pechin =

American college football player (born 1996)

No. 1
- Positions: Punter, placekicker

Personal information
- Born: November 18, 1996 (age 29); Kennett Square, Pennsylvania, U.S.
- Listed height: 6 ft 1 in (1.85 m)
- Listed weight: 213 lb (97 kg)

Career information
- High school: Unionville (Kennett Square, Pennsylvania)
- College: Bucknell (2015–2019)

Awards and highlights
- FCS Punter of the Year (2019); First-team FCS All-American (2019); Second-team FCS All-American (2018); Third-team FCS All-American (2017); 4× First-team All-Patriot League (2015, 2017–2019); 3× First-team All-ECAC (2017–2019)

Alex Pechin (born November 18, 1996) is an American former football punter and placekicker who played college football for the Bucknell Bison.

== Early life ==
Pechin played quarterback at Unionville High School in Kennett Square, Pennsylvania. Pechin took snaps from Andrew “Poppins” Jones who went on to play for Bryant University.

== College career ==
Pechin led the FCS in punting average his senior season, with an average of 47.3 yards per punt. For his efforts he was named FCS Punter of the Year. He participated in the 2020 East-West Shrine Bowl on January 18, 2020. He was named to the STATS FCS All-Decade Team. Pechin was the only player from the Patriot League to attend the 2020 NFL Scouting Combine.

== Professional career ==
Pre-draft measurables
Height	Weight	Arm length	Hand span	40-yard dash	10-yard split	20-yard split	Vertical jump	Bench press
6 ft 0 5/8 in (1.84 m)	213 lb (97 kg)	29 5/8 in (0.75 m)	9 3/8 in (0.24 m)	4.69 s	1.69 s	2.75 s	34.0 in (0.86 m)	13 reps
All values from NFL Draft
