= 2019 Princeton Tigers football team =

American college football season

2019 Princeton Tigers football
- Conference: Ivy League
- Record: 8–2 (5–2 Ivy)
- Head coach: Bob Surace (10th season)
- Offensive coordinator: Andrew Aurich (1st season)
- Offensive scheme: Pro spread
- Defensive coordinator: Steve Verbit (7th season)
- Base defense: 4–2–5
- Home stadium: Powers Field at Princeton Stadium

Uniform
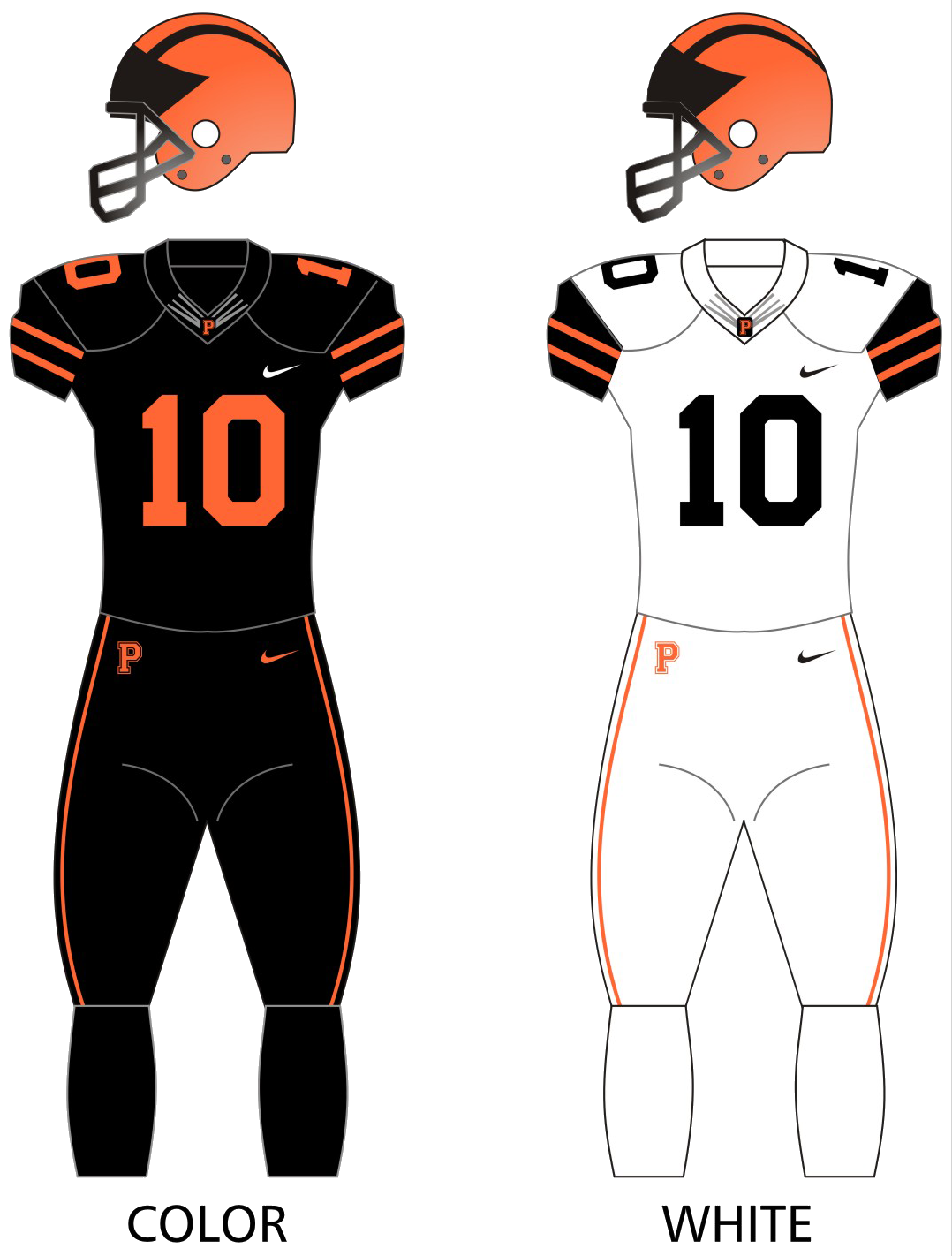

2019 Ivy League football standings
	Conf.			Overall
Team	W		L	W		L
No. 22 Dartmouth +	6	–	1	9	–	1
No. 25 Yale +	6	–	1	9	–	1
Princeton	5	–	2	8	–	2
Penn	3	–	4	5	–	5
Cornell	3	–	4	4	–	6
Harvard	2	–	5	4	–	6
Columbia	2	–	5	3	–	7
Brown	1	–	6	2	–	8
+ – Conference co-champions; Rankings from STATS Poll

The 2019 Princeton Tigers football team represented Princeton University in the 2019 NCAA Division I FCS football season. They were led by tenth-year head coach Bob Surace and played their home games at Powers Field at Princeton Stadium. Princeton played as a member of the Ivy League. They finished the season 8–2 overall and 5–2 in Ivy League play to place third. Princeton averaged 9,605 fans per game.

== Preseason ==
=== Preseason media poll ===
The Ivy League released their preseason media poll on August 8, 2019. The Tigers were picked to finish in third place.

== Schedule ==
Date	Time	Opponent	Rank	Site	TV	Result	Attendance
September 21	5:00 p.m.	Butler*		Powers Field at Princeton Stadium; Princeton, NJ	ESPN+	W 49–7	10,625
September 28	3:30 p.m.	at Bucknell*		Christy Mathewson–Memorial Stadium; Lewistown, PA	PLN	W 56–23	3,795
October 5	1:00 p.m.	Columbia	No. 25	Powers Field at Princeton Stadium; Princeton, NJ	ESPN+	W 21–10	5,225
October 11	7:00 p.m.	Lafayette*	No. 21	Powers Field at Princeton Stadium; Princeton, NJ	ESPNU	W 28–3	4,521
October 19	12:30 p.m.	at Brown	No. 17	Brown Stadium; Providence, RI	ESPN+	W 65–22	4,703
October 26	1:00 p.m.	Harvard^{†}	No. 13	Powers Field at Princeton Stadium; Princeton, NJ (rivalry)	ESPN+	W 30–24	9,078
November 1	6:00 p.m.	at Cornell	No. 12	Schoellkopf Field; Ithaca, NY	ESPNU	W 21–7	1,745
November 9	3:30 p.m.	vs. No. 13 Dartmouth	No. 10	Yankee Stadium; Bronx, NY	ESPNU	L 10–27	21,506
November 16	1:00 p.m.	Yale	No. 18	Powers Field at Princeton Stadium; Princeton, NJ (rivalry)	ESPN+	L 14–51	6,676
November 23	1:00 p.m.	at Penn		Franklin Field; Philadelphia, PA (rivalry)	ESPN+	W 28–7	7,898
*Non-conference game; ^{†}Homecoming; Rankings from STATS Poll released prior to the game; All times are in Eastern time

== Game summaries ==
=== Butler ===
	1	2	3	4	Total
Bulldogs	0	0	0	7	7
Tigers	14	28	7	0	49

=== At Bucknell ===
	1	2	3	4	Total
Tigers	7	21	14	14	56
Bison	7	7	3	6	23

=== Columbia ===
	1	2	3	4	Total
Lions	3	7	0	0	10
No. 25 Tigers	7	0	7	7	21

=== Lafayette ===
	1	2	3	4	Total
Leopards	0	3	0	0	3
No. 21 Tigers	7	7	14	0	28

=== At Brown ===
	1	2	3	4	Total
No. 17 Tigers	17	34	7	7	65
Bears	6	13	3	0	22

=== Harvard ===
	1	2	3	4	Total
Crimson	0	14	0	10	24
No. 13 Tigers	10	0	13	7	30

=== At Cornell ===
	1	2	3	4	Total
No. 12 Tigers	0	14	7	0	21
Big Red	0	0	7	0	7

=== Vs. Dartmouth ===
	1	2	3	4	Total
No. 10 Tigers	0	7	3	0	10
No. 13 Big Green	7	10	3	7	27

=== Yale ===
	1	2	3	4	Total
Bulldogs	3	27	7	14	51
No. 18 Tigers	0	7	7	0	14

=== At Penn ===
	1	2	3	4	Total
Tigers	7	3	10	8	28
Quakers	7	0	0	0	7

== Rankings ==
Ranking movements Legend: ██ Increase in ranking ██ Decrease in ranking — = Not ranked RV = Received votes
	Week														
Poll	Pre	1	2	3	4	5	6	7	8	9	10	11	12	13	Final
STATS FCS	24	RV	RV	RV	RV	25	21	17	13	12	10	18	RV	RV	RV
Coaches	24	25	25	24	RV	RV	19	16	13	12	9	19	RV	RV	—
