= 2019 Celebration Bowl =

Postseason college football bowl game

- 5th Celebration Bowl
Alcorn State Braves	North Carolina A&T Aggies
(9–3)	(8–3)
SWAC	MEAC
44	64
Head coach: Fred McNair	Head coach: Sam Washington
	STATS 23
	1	2	3	4	Total
Alcorn State	3	7	21	13	44
North Carolina A&T	0	24	28	12	64
- Date: December 21, 2019
- Season: 2019
- Stadium: Mercedes-Benz Stadium
- Location: Atlanta, Georgia
- MVP: Kylil Carter (QB, NC A&T) & Jacob Roberts (LB, NC A&T)
- Favorite: North Carolina A&T by 3
- Referee: Hubert Owens (SEC)
- Attendance: 32,968

United States TV coverage
- Network: ABC
- Announcers: Mark Jones (play-by-play), Dusty Dvoracek and Jay Walker (analysts), Roddy Jones and Tiffany Greene (sidline)

The 2019 Celebration Bowl was a college football bowl game played on December 21, 2019, with kickoff at 12:00 p.m. EST on ABC. It was the 5th edition of the Celebration Bowl, and the only one of the 2019–20 bowl games to feature FCS teams.

== Teams ==
For the second consecutive year, the bowl was played between the Alcorn State Braves and the North Carolina A&T Aggies.

=== Alcorn State ===
Alcorn State earned their berth in the Celebration Bowl via a win over the Southern Jaguars in the SWAC Championship Game on December 7. The Braves entered the Celebration Bowl with a 9–3 overall record (6–1 in conference). This was their third appearance in the Celebration Bowl, having lost their prior two appearances (2015 and 2018); both losses were to North Carolina A&T.

=== North Carolina A&T ===
North Carolina A&T, led by second-year head coach Sam Washington, clinched their spot in the Celebration bowl on November 23 with their win over North Carolina Central. The Aggies entered the game with an overall 8–3 record (6–2 in conference). They finished runner-up in the MEAC behind Florida A&M, who were ineligible for postseason play due to NCAA sanctions. This was the Aggies' fourth appearance in the Celebration Bowl, having won each of their previous three (2015, 2017, 2018).

== Game summary ==
2019 Celebration Bowl

Quarter	1	2	3	4	Total
Alcorn State	3	7	21	13	44
North Carolina A&T	0	24	28	12	64

at Mercedes-Benz Stadium • Atlanta, Georgia

- Date: Saturday, December 21, 2019
- Game time: 12:00 p.m. EST
- Game weather: None (retractable roof closed)
- Game attendance: 32,968
- Referee: Hubert Owens
- TV announcers (ABC): Mark Jones (play-by-play), Dusty Dvoracek and Jay Walker (analysts), Roddy Jones and Tiffany Greene (sideline)
- ESPN game summary

Game information

First Quarter

- (3:17) ALCN – Corey McCullough 28 yard field goal (Drive: 10 plays, 23 yards, 3:48; Alcorn State 3–0)

Second Quarter

- (13:03) NCAT – Kylil Carter 53 yard pass to Elijah Bell, Noel Ruiz kick (Drive: 3 plays, 65 yards, 1:06; North Carolina A&T 7–3)
- (10:16) ALCN – Felix Harper 36 yard pass to Chris Blair, Corey McCullough kick (Drive: 6 plays, 74 yards, 2:47; Alcorn State 10–7)
- (7:55) NCAT – Kylil Carter 59 yard pass to Zachary Leslie, Noel Ruiz kick (Drive: 5 plays, 70 yards, 2:21; North Carolina A&T 14–10)
- (5:05) NCAT – Noel Ruiz 26 yard field goal (Drive: 3 plays, −4 yards, 2:03; North Carolina A&T 17–10)
- (0:41) NCAT – Kylil Carter 4 yard pass to Korey Banks, Noel Ruiz kick (Drive: 8 plays, 64 yards, 2:54; North Carolina A&T 24–10)

Third Quarter

- (14:47) NCAT – Jah-Maine Martin 75 yard rush, Noel Ruiz kick (Drive: 1 play, 75 yards, 0:13; North Carolina A&T 31–10)
- (11:37) ALCN – Felix Harper 6 yard rush, Corey McCullough kick (Drive: 10 plays, 75 yards, 3:10; North Carolina A&T 31–17)
- (10:06) NCAT – Kylil Carter 43 yard pass to Ron Hunt, Noel Ruiz kick (Drive: 4 plays, 75 yards, 1:31; North Carolina A&T 38–17)
- (9:09) ALCN – De'Shawn Waller 23 yard rush, Corey McCullough kick (Drive: 3 plays, 75 yards, 0:57; North Carolina A&T 38–24)
- (4:56) NCAT – Kylil Carter 20 yard pass to Elijah Bell, Noel Ruiz kick (Drive: 10 plays, 68 yards, 4:13; North Carolina A&T 45–24)
- (3:49) ALCN – Felix Harper 35 yard pass to Raidarious Anderson, Corey McCullough kick (Drive: 3 plays, 75 yards, 1:07; North Carolina A&T 45–31)
- (2:50) NCAT – Kylil Carter 73 yard pass to Korey Banks, Noel Ruiz kick (Drive: 2 plays, 67 yards, 0:59; North Carolina A&T 52–31)

Fourth Quarter

- (13:14) ALCN – Felix Harper 13 yard pass to Nigel Wood, Corey McCullough kick (Drive: 1 play, 13 yards, 0:03; North Carolina A&T 52–38)
- (7:00) NCAT – Noel Ruiz 38 yard field goal (Drive: 11 plays, 30 yards, 6:14; North Carolina A&T 55–38)
- (4:36) ALCN – Felix Harper 1 yard rush, kick blocked (Drive: 9 plays, 75 yards, 2:24; North Carolina A&T 55–44)
- (4:36) NCAT – Amir McNeill blocked PAT return for defensive 2-point conversion (North Carolina A&T 57–44)
- (3:37) NCAT – Jah-Maine Martin 4 yard rush, Noel Ruiz kick (Drive: 2 plays, 59 yards, 0:59; North Carolina 64–44)

=== Statistics ===
Statistics	ALCN	NCAT
First downs	24	21
Plays–yards	74–460	64–574
Rushes–yards	32–119	34–210
Passing yards	341	364
Passing: comp–att–int	25–42–1	18–30–0
Time of possession	29:36	30:24

Team	Category	Player	Statistics
Alcorn State	Passing	Felix Harper	25/42, 341 yards, 3 TD, INT
Alcorn State	Rushing	De'Shawn Waller	13 carries, 59 yards, TD
Alcorn State	Receiving	Chris Blair	7 receptions, 150 yards, TD
North Carolina A&T	Passing	Kylil Carter	18/30, 364 yards, 6 TD
North Carolina A&T	Rushing	Jah-Maine Martin	16 carries, 110 yards, 2 TD
North Carolina A&T	Receiving	Korey Banks	6 receptions, 122 yards, 2 TD
