= 2019 North Carolina A&T Aggies football team =

American college football season

2019 North Carolina A&T Aggies football
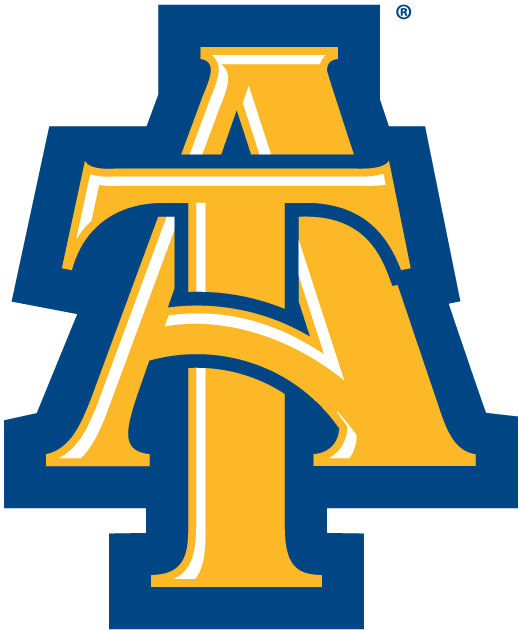

Black college national champion MEAC co-champion Celebration Bowl champion

Celebration Bowl, W 64–44 vs. Alcorn State
- Conference: Mid-Eastern Athletic Conference

Ranking
- STATS: No. 20
- FCS Coaches: No. 23
- Record: 9–3 (6–2 MEAC)
- Head coach: Sam Washington (2nd season)
- Offensive coordinator: Chris Barnette (2nd season)
- Offensive scheme: Multiple pro-style
- Defensive coordinator: Courtney Coard (2nd season)
- Base defense: 4–2–5
- Home stadium: BB&T Stadium

2019 Mid-Eastern Athletic Conference football standings
| | Conf. | | | Overall |
| Team | W | | L | W | | L |
|---|---|---|---|---|---|---|
| No. 24 Florida A&M * | 7 | – | 1 | 9 | – | 2 |
| No. 20 North Carolina A&T + | 6 | – | 2 | 9 | – | 3 |
| South Carolina State + | 6 | – | 2 | 8 | – | 3 |
| Bethune–Cookman | 5 | – | 3 | 7 | – | 4 |
| Norfolk State | 4 | – | 4 | 5 | – | 7 |
| North Carolina Central | 3 | – | 5 | 4 | – | 8 |
| Howard | 2 | – | 6 | 2 | – | 10 |
| Morgan State | 2 | – | 6 | 3 | – | 9 |
| Delaware State | 1 | – | 7 | 2 | – | 10 |
+ – Conference co-champions; * Florida A&M ineligible for conference title due to NCAA sanctions; Rankings from STATS Poll

The 2019 North Carolina A&T Aggies football team represented North Carolina Agricultural and Technical State University as a member of the Mid-Eastern Athletic Conference (MEAC) in the 2019 NCAA Division I FCS football season. This marked the 96th season for the program, and the Aggies were led by second-year head coach Sam Washington. The Aggies finished the season with a record of 9–3 overall and 6–2 in MEAC play, capturing their 11th conference title. The Aggies also earned an invitation to the Celebration Bowl where they defeated Southwestern Athletic Conference champion Alcorn State, earning their seventh black college football national championship. The Aggies played their home games at BB&T Stadium.

== Before the season ==
At the conclusion of the 2018 football season, the Aggies lost key players such as two-time MEAC Offensive Player of the Year, Lamar Reynard; 2018 MEAC Offensive Lineman of the Year, Left Guard Michah Shaw. In addition, the Aggies also lost Running Back Marquell Cartwright, who had 2 seasons of 1000 plus rushing yard seasons and MEAC defensive player of the year, Darryl Johnson who decided to forego his senior season and declare early for the 2019 NFL draft.

=== Recruiting ===
Prior to National Signing Day in February 2019 two players enrolled for the spring semester in order to participate in spring practice. On National Signing Day, A&T signed 19 additional players out of high school that completed the 2019 recruiting class. Of the class, 12 players were from North Carolina.

College recruiting information (2019)
| Name | Hometown | School | Height | Weight | Commit date |
|---|---|---|---|---|---|
| JaMichael Baldwin; WR | Conyers, GA | Savannah State | 5 ft 9 in (1.75 m) | 165 lb (75 kg) | Jan 16, 2019 |
| JaMichael Baldwin; WR | Recruit ratings: No ratings found | | | | |
| Korey Banks; WR | Tyrone, GA | South Carolina | 5 ft 11 in (1.80 m) | 190 lb (86 kg) | Feb 6, 2019 |
| Korey Banks; WR | Recruit ratings: Scout: Rivals: | | | | |
| Trawn Barrington; OL | Ontario, CAN | Victor Valley College | 6 ft 5 in (1.96 m) | 305 lb (138 kg) | Dec 19, 2018 |
| Trawn Barrington; OL | Recruit ratings: No ratings found | | | | |
| Herbert Booker; DB | Oak Ridge, TN | Oak Ridge | 5 ft 10 in (1.78 m) | 185 lb (84 kg) | Feb 6, 2019 |
| Herbert Booker; DB | Recruit ratings: No ratings found | | | | |
| Anthony "AJ" Dupree; DB | Snow Hill, NC | Greene County | 5 ft 11 in (1.80 m) | 190 lb (86 kg) | Feb 6, 2019 |
| Anthony "AJ" Dupree; DB | Recruit ratings: No ratings found | | | | |
| Mykul "Prestige" Edwards; WR | Charlotte, NC | East Mecklenburg | 6 ft 5 in (1.96 m) | 183 lb (83 kg) | Feb 6, 2019 |
| Mykul "Prestige" Edwards; WR | Recruit ratings: No ratings found | | | | |
| Alex Fumbach; LB | Snellville, GA | Fort Scott CC | 6 ft 1 in (1.85 m) | 225 lb (102 kg) | Feb 6, 2019 |
| Alex Fumbach; LB | Recruit ratings: No ratings found | | | | |
| Aaron Harris; ATH | Elizabeth City, NC | Northeast | 5 ft 9 in (1.75 m) | 180 lb (82 kg) | Feb 6, 2019 |
| Aaron Harris; ATH | Recruit ratings: No ratings found | | | | |
| Cameron Hutchinson; RB | Havelock, NC | Havelock | 5 ft 11 in (1.80 m) | 210 lb (95 kg) | Feb 6, 2019 |
| Cameron Hutchinson; RB | Recruit ratings: No ratings found | | | | |
| Kingsley Ifesi; QB | Charlotte, NC | East Carolina | 6 ft 3 in (1.91 m) | 215 lb (98 kg) | Dec 15, 2018 |
| Kingsley Ifesi; QB | Recruit ratings: No ratings found | | | | |
| Jason Ivey; OL | Charlotte, NC | South Mecklenburg | 6 ft 4 in (1.93 m) | 297 lb (135 kg) | Feb 6, 2019 |
| Jason Ivey; OL | Recruit ratings: No ratings found | | | | |
| Tyquan Johnson; DL | Cordova, SC | Edisto | 6 ft 3 in (1.91 m) | 289 lb (131 kg) | Feb 6, 2019 |
| Tyquan Johnson; DL | Recruit ratings: No ratings found | | | | |
| Cesar Minarro; OL | Charlotte, NC | Sun Valley | 6 ft 3 in (1.91 m) | 283 lb (128 kg) | Feb 6, 2019 |
| Cesar Minarro; OL | Recruit ratings: No ratings found | | | | |
| Jacob Roberts; LB | charlotte, NC | Mallard Creek | 6 ft 0 in (1.83 m) | 218 lb (99 kg) | Feb 6, 2019 |
| Jacob Roberts; LB | Recruit ratings: No ratings found | | | | |
| Janorris Robertson; DE | jacksonville, FL | Raines | 6 ft 2 in (1.88 m) | 240 lb (110 kg) | Feb 6, 2019 |
| Janorris Robertson; DE | Recruit ratings: No ratings found | | | | |
| Kyle Stanback; DE | Newbury Park, CA | Newbury Park | 6 ft 6 in (1.98 m) | 260 lb (120 kg) | Feb 6, 2019 |
| Kyle Stanback; DE | Recruit ratings: No ratings found | | | | |
| Janaz Sumpter; ATH | Hemingway, SC | Carver's Bay | 5 ft 11 in (1.80 m) | 180 lb (82 kg) | Feb 6, 2019 |
| Janaz Sumpter; ATH | Recruit ratings: No ratings found | | | | |
| Shemar Thompson; RB | Burlington, NC | Walter Williams | 6 ft 0 in (1.83 m) | 190 lb (86 kg) | Feb 6, 2019 |
| Shemar Thompson; RB | Recruit ratings: No ratings found | | | | |
| Melik Ward; DL | Tarboro, NC | Tarboro | 5 ft 11 in (1.80 m) | 265 lb (120 kg) | Feb 6, 2019 |
| Melik Ward; DL | Recruit ratings: No ratings found | | | | |
| Thomas Washington; DT | Fayetteville, NC | Seventy-First | 6 ft 2 in (1.88 m) | 280 lb (130 kg) | Feb 6, 2019 |
| Thomas Washington; DT | Recruit ratings: No ratings found | | | | |
| Chase Williamson; OLB | Gastonia, NC | Hunter Huss | 6 ft 0 in (1.83 m) | 200 lb (91 kg) | Feb 6, 2019 |
| Chase Williamson; OLB | Recruit ratings: No ratings found | | | | |
Overall recruit ranking:
Note: In many cases, Scout, Rivals, 247Sports, On3, and ESPN may conflict in their listings of height and weight.; In these cases, the average was taken. ESPN grades are on a 100-point scale.; Sources: "2019 Team Ranking". Rivals.com.

=== MEAC poll ===
In the MEAC preseason poll released on July 26, 2019, the Aggies were predicted to finish in first place.

=== Preseason All–MEAC teams ===
The Aggies had eleven players selected to the preseason all-MEAC teams.

First Team Offense

Marcus Pettiford – OL

Dontae Keys – OL

Second Team Offense

Jah-Maine Martin – RB

Elijah Bell – WR

Third Team Offense

Zachary Leslie – WR

First Team Defense

Justin Cates – DL

Mac McCain – DB

Second Team Defense

Antoine Wilder – LB

Third Team Defense

Jermaine Williams – DL

Richie Kittles – LB

Michael Rivers – P

== Coaching staff ==
2019 North Carolina A&T Aggies coaching staff
| Head coach: Head coach – Sam Washington; Assistant head coach – Dominic Frescura; Offensive coaches: Offensive coordinator/quarterbacks – Chris Barnette; Offensive line – Ronald Mattes; Wide receivers – Matt Pawlowski; Running backs/recruiting coordinator – Shawn Gibbs; Tight end/video coordinator – Deshaun Massey & Glenn Reese; Defensive coaches: Co-defensive coordinator/defensive line – Courtney Coard; Inside linebackers – Denzel Jones; Outside linebackers – Terry Lantz; Defensive backs – Thomas Howard | Administrative staff: Athletic Director (A.D.) – Earl M. Hilton III; Director of football operations – Jay Respass |

== Roster ==
2019 North Carolina A&T Aggies Roster (Source)
| Quarterbacks: 1 Jalen Fowler – (redshirt) Sophomore; 10 Kylil Carter – Graduate Student; 12 Kingsley Ifedi – (redshirt) Sophomore; 16 Khalil Gilliam – (redshirt) Freshman; Wide receivers: 2 Korey Banks – Junior; 3 Chance Pride – Sophomore; 13 Elijah Bell – Senior; 15 Ahmed Bah – (redshirt) Junior; 18 Taymon Cooke – (redshirt) Freshman; 19 Zachary Leslie – (redshirt) Junior; 80 Israel Spivey – (redshirt) Freshman; 81 Ron Hunt – Senior; 86 Jordan McDaniel – (redshirt) Sophomore; 88 Mykul (Prestige) Edwards – Freshman; Offensive line: 55 Dacquari Wilson – (redshirt) Sophomore; 60 Lawrence Lagrone – (redshirt) Freshman; 61 Tyshawn Miller – (redshirt) Sophomore; 62 Rio Claytor - (redshirt) Freshman; 63 Jeremiah Martin - (redshirt) Junior; 66 Arlander Cherry – (redshirt) Junior; 68 Cesar Minarro – Freshman; 69 Deven Milton – (redshirt) Junior; 70 Trawn Barrington – Freshman; 72 Tim Williams – (redshirt) Freshman; 73 Marcus Pettiford – (redshirt) Senior; 74 De'jour Simpson – (redshirt) Junior; 75 Bilal Ali – (redshirt) Junior; 76 Tyler Clifford – (redshirt) Freshman; 77 Breontae Matthews – Graduate Student; 79 Dontae Keys – (redshirt) Junior | Tight ends: 82 Jarvis Reid – Senior; 84 Quinzel Lockhart – (redshirt) Sophomore; Fullbacks: 46 William Simpson – (redshirt) Senior; 49 Justin Nwachukwu – Senior; Running backs: 25 Kashon Baker – Senior; 26 Darius Graves – (redshirt) Junior; 30 Jah-Maine Martin – (redshirt) Junior; 36 T.J. Boyce – (redshirt) Freshman; Defensive line: 41 Leon "Tre" Smalls – Senior; 43 Melik Ward – Freshman; 50 Devin Harrell – (redshirt) Sophomore; 52 Michael Branch – Senior; 90 Karfa Kaba – (redshirt) Sophomore; 92 Jermaine Williams – (redshirt) Senior; 94 Justin Cates – Graduate Student; 96 Thomas Washington – Freshman; Defensive ends: 91 Janorris Robertson – Freshman; 93 Jermaine McDaniel – (redshirt) Sophomore; 95 Kyle Stanback – Freshman; 98 Kadarius Kendrick – (redshirt) Senior; Rovers: 22 Anthony "AJ" Dupree – Freshman; 34 Jazir Staton – (redshirt) Freshman; 58 Tyler Schuster – (redshirt) Sophomore | Linebackers: 8 Joseph Stuckey – Sophomore; 9 Antoine Wilder – (redshirt) Senior; 23 Alex Fumbah – Junior; 40 Chris Williams – (redshirt) Freshman; 44 Chase Williamson – Freshman; 45 KeAndre Jones – (redshirt) Sophomore; 48 Stephen Davis Jr. – (redshirt) Junior; 53 Julian Monell – (redshirt) Freshman; 54 Kyin Howard – (redshirt) Sophomore; 57 Jacob Roberts – Freshman; 59 Elijah Westbrook – (redshirt) Senior; Defensive backs: 4 Miles Simon – (redshirt) Freshman; 5 Richie Kittles – (redshirt) Senior; 14 Herbert Booker – Freshman; 20 Najee Reams – (redshirt) Junior; 21 Derrek Williams – (redshirt) Junior; 24 Amir McNeil – (redshirt) Sophomore; 27 Jabari Butler – (redshirt) Senior; 29 Mac McCain – (redshirt) Junior; 32 Aaron Harris – Freshman; 33 Jalon Bethea – (redshirt) Senior; 37 Janaz Sumpter – Freshman; 39 Chris Moseley – (redshirt) Senior; 42 Will Jones – (redshirt) Sophomore; Punters: 17 James Mackey – (redshirt) Senior; 47 Michael Rivers – Sophomore; Kickers: 35 Noel Ruiz – Junior; 38 Davis Rogers – (redshirt) Sophomore; Long snappers: 51 John Davis – Junior; 67 Ernest (Petie) Bush III – (redshirt) Senior |
† Starter at position * Injured; did not play in 2019.

== Schedule ==
| Date | Time | Opponent | Rank | Site | TV | Result | Attendance | Source |
|---|---|---|---|---|---|---|---|---|
| August 31 | 6:00 p.m. | No. 21 Elon* | No. 20 | BB&T Stadium; Greensboro, NC | LTV | W 24–21 | 16,358 | |
| September 7 | 6:00 p.m. | at Duke* | No. 15 | Wallace Wade Stadium; Durham, NC | ACCN Extra | L 13–45 | 38,313 | |
| September 14 | 6:00 p.m. | at Charleston Southern* | No. 15 | Buccaneer Field; Charleston, SC | ESPN+ | W 27–21 | 5,112 | |
| September 26 | 7:30 p.m. | Delaware State | No. 17 | BB&T Stadium; Greensboro, NC | ESPNU, LTV | W 37–0 | 16,567 | |
| October 5 | 2:00 p.m. | at Norfolk State | No. 15 | William "Dick" Price Stadium; Norfolk, VA | ESPN3 | W 58–19 | 11,062 | |
| October 20 | 2:00 p.m. | at Florida A&M | No. 10 | Bragg Memorial Stadium; Tallahassee, FL | ESPN3 | L 31–34 ^{OT} | 1,051 | |
| October 26 | 1:00 p.m. | Howard^{†} | No. 18 | BB&T Stadium; Greensboro, NC | LTV, ESPN3 | W 64–6 | 21,500 | |
| November 2 | 1:30 p.m. | at South Carolina State | No. 16 | Oliver C. Dawson Stadium; Orangeburg, SC (rivalry) | ESPN3 | W 22–20 | 11,183 | |
| November 9 | 1:00 p.m. | at Morgan State | No. 14 | Hughes Stadium; Baltimore, MD | ESPN3 | L 16–22 | 2,467 | |
| November 16 | 1:00 p.m. | Bethune–Cookman | No. 25 | BB&T Stadium; Greensboro, NC | LTV, ESPN3 | W 47–17 | 10,355 | |
| November 23 | 1:00 p.m. | North Carolina Central | No. 25 | BB&T Stadium; Greensboro, NC (rivalry) | LTV, ESPN3 | W 54–0 | 11,055 | |
| December 21 | 12:00 p.m. | vs. Alcorn State* | No. 23 | Mercedes-Benz Stadium; Atlanta, GA (Celebration Bowl) | ABC | W 64–44 | 32,968 | |
*Non-conference game; ^{†}Homecoming; Rankings from STATS Poll released prior to the game; All times are in Eastern time

== Game summaries ==
=== No. 21 Elon ===
| | 1 | 2 | 3 | 4 | Total |
|---|---|---|---|---|---|
| No. 21 Phoenix | 7 | 0 | 0 | 14 | 21 |
| No. 20 Aggies | 0 | 14 | 0 | 10 | 24 |

| Statistics | ELON | NCAT |
|---|---|---|
| First downs | 17 | 19 |
| Total yards | 221 | 326 |
| Rushing yards | 19 | 133 |
| Passing yards | 202 | 193 |
| Turnovers | 1 | 0 |
| Time of possession | 27:50 | 32:10 |

| Team | Category | Player | Statistics |
|---|---|---|---|
| Elon | Passing | Davis Cheek | 16/27, 202 yards, TD |
| Elon | Rushing | Brelynd Cyphers | 4 rushes, 30 yards |
| Elon | Receiving | Matt Foster | 3 receptions, 48 yards |
| North Carolina A&T | Passing | Kylil Carter | 16/27, 193 yards, 2 TD |
| North Carolina A&T | Rushing | Jah-Maine Martin | 21 rushes, 54 yards, TD |
| North Carolina A&T | Receiving | Elijah Bell | 9 receptions, 93 yards, TD |

This game marked the 12th meeting between the Aggies and In-State Division I FCS opponent Elon. Going into the game, both teams were nationally ranked as the Aggies and Phoenix were ranked 20th and 21st in the STATS FCS Preseason poll. As of the time of kickoff, A&T held a 7–4 all-time record against Elon, and had won the last 3 matchups, including a 14–7 road win in 2015. This matchup was the final game of a 4-year series between the two that began in 2013.

Elon were the first to score from a 5-yard run for a touchdown by running back De'Sean McNair. The Phoenix ended the first quarter up 7–0. In the second quarter, the A&T responded with 14 unanswered points. Running Back Jah'Maine Martin tied the game with a 1-yard run and wide receiver Elijah Bell scored on a 5-yard pass from quarterback Kylil Carter. Bell's catch made him the all-time leader in touchdown receptions for the Aggies. On the opening drive of the second half, the Phoenix tied the game with a 2-yard run by De'Sean McNair. The Aggies regained the lead with a 10-yard pass from Kylil Carter to Quinzel Lockhart. The Phoenix responded with a 14-yard reception by Kortez Weeks tying the game at 21–21. In the 4th quarter, both teams exchanged possession of the ball as the game clock wound down to 0:01 seconds remaining. On the game's final play, kicker Noel Ruiz made make a 52-yard field goal, securing the Aggies' victory, 24–21. Ruiz's field goal tied the program's record which was set by Yonnick Mathews in 2003. The 50 plus yard game-winning kick was the first since Carlos Dacalos made one in 2004.

=== At Duke ===
| | 1 | 2 | 3 | 4 | Total |
|---|---|---|---|---|---|
| No. 15 Aggies | 3 | 7 | 3 | 0 | 13 |
| Blue Devils | 7 | 21 | 10 | 7 | 45 |

| Statistics | NCAT | DUKE |
|---|---|---|
| First downs | 10 | 31 |
| Total yards | 249 | 574 |
| Rushing yards | 138 | 210 |
| Passing yards | 111 | 364 |
| Turnovers | 2 | 2 |
| Time of possession | 25:30 | 34:30 |

| Team | Category | Player | Statistics |
|---|---|---|---|
| North Carolina A&T | Passing | Kylil Carter | 8/22, 111 yards |
| North Carolina A&T | Rushing | Jah-Maine Martin | 10 rushes, 82 yards, TD |
| North Carolina A&T | Receiving | Elijah Bell | 2 receptions, 52 yards |
| Duke | Passing | Quentin Harris | 30/42, 345 yards, 4 TD |
| Duke | Rushing | Quentin Harris | 13 rushes, 83 yards, TD |
| Duke | Receiving | Jalon Calhoun | 8 receptions, 105 yards, 2 TD |

This game marked the first meeting between the Aggies and in-state FBS opponent Duke. The Aggies last saw an opponent from the ACC in 2015, when they lost to North Carolina 53–14.

The Aggies were able to score first with a 40-yard field goal by Noel Ruiz. Duke countered with a 38-yard pass from Quinton Harris to Jalon Calhoun for a touchdown. On the second play of the Aggies' first drive of the second quarter, A&T running back Jah-Maine Martin scored on a 66-yard carry to put A&T in the lead 10–7. Duke was able put together an offensive attack that resulted in three touchdowns in rapid succession, putting the Blue Devils into a 28–10 lead with 3:10 left before halftime. In the third quarter, Duke's AJ Reed scored on a 50-yard field goal. The Aggies responded with a 36-yard field goal of his own, making the score 31–13. The Blue Devils ended the third quarter with a 24-yard pass from Quinton Harris to Jalon Calhoun for a touchdown extending their lead to 38–13. In the fourth quarter, Duke scored one last time on Mataeo Durant's 1-yard run.

=== At Charleston Southern ===
| | 1 | 2 | 3 | 4 | Total |
|---|---|---|---|---|---|
| No. 15 Aggies | 0 | 6 | 0 | 21 | 27 |
| Buccaneers | 7 | 7 | 0 | 7 | 21 |

| Statistics | NCAT | CHSO |
|---|---|---|
| First downs | 20 | 18 |
| Total yards | 467 | 281 |
| Rushing yards | 292 | 48 |
| Passing yards | 175 | 233 |
| Turnovers | 1 | 2 |
| Time of possession | 31:53 | 28:07 |

| Team | Category | Player | Statistics |
|---|---|---|---|
| North Carolina A&T | Passing | Kylil Carter | 14/29, 175 yards |
| North Carolina A&T | Rushing | Jah-Maine Martin | 25 rushes, 299 yards, 2 TD |
| North Carolina A&T | Receiving | Elijah Bell | 5 receptions, 77 yards |
| Charleston Southern | Passing | Jack Chambers | 18/30, 188 yards, TD, 2 INT |
| Charleston Southern | Rushing | Ronnie Harris | 12 rushes, 26 yards |
| Charleston Southern | Receiving | Kameron Brown | 9 receptions, 110 yards, 2 TD |

This game marks the first meeting between the Aggies and FCS opponent Charleston Southern. The Aggies are currently on a 2-game win streek against competition from the Big South Conference; with last season's win over Gardner-Webb 45–6.

Charleston Southern was able to get on the scoreboard with the first with a 33-yard pass from quarterback Jack Chambers to Kameron Brown to score the only points of the 1st quarter. In the 2nd quarter, the Buccaneers scored on a 1-yard run by Jack Chambers, putting them ahead 14–0. With 5:56 remaining in the half, Kicker Noel Ruiz kicked a 31-yard field goal to get the Aggies on the board. Ruiz was able to make another field goal, this time from 43 yards, with time running out on the half. In the 3rd quarter, neither the Aggies nor the Buccaneers were able to score. In the opening minute of the 4th quarter, Running Back Jah-Maine Martin scored on an 84-yard run, the Aggies were able to follow up with a 2-point conversion making the game 14–14.

=== Delaware State ===
| | 1 | 2 | 3 | 4 | Total |
|---|---|---|---|---|---|
| Hornets | 0 | 0 | 0 | 0 | 0 |
| No. 17 Aggies | 7 | 21 | 9 | 0 | 37 |

| Statistics | DSU | NCAT |
|---|---|---|
| First downs | 8 | 27 |
| Total yards | 100 | 432 |
| Rushing yards | 23 | 258 |
| Passing yards | 77 | 174 |
| Turnovers | 1 | 1 |
| Time of possession | 24:03 | 35:57 |

| Team | Category | Player | Statistics |
|---|---|---|---|
| Delaware State | Passing | Tylik Bethea | 9/21, 69 yards |
| Delaware State | Rushing | Bryant Dallas | 13 rushes, 44 yards |
| Delaware State | Receiving | Kwannah Kollie | 4 receptions, 33 yards |
| North Carolina A&T | Passing | Kylil Carter | 16/27, 167 yards, TD |
| North Carolina A&T | Rushing | Jah-Maine Martin | 14 rushes, 108 yards, 4 TD |
| North Carolina A&T | Receiving | Elijah Bell | 9 receptions, 101 yards |

This game marked the 47th meeting between the Aggies and Delaware State. Going into the game, the Aggies led the series 24–22–1 over the hornets, including a 34–6 home victory in 2018. The game also marked the return of All-America Cornerback Mac McCain, who suffered a season-ending injury to his left knee in November 2018; McCain he completed the day with 3 tackles and 1 pass breakup.

The Aggies scored the only points of the first quarter from a 24-yard run by running back Jah-Maine martin. In the second quarter, Martin got his second touchdown of the day with a 28-yard run, making the score 14–0. Kick returner/ wide receiver Korey Banks scored on an 8-yard pass from quarterback Kylil Carter, while Martin closed out the half with a 1-yard run, making the score 28–0. In the second half, Martin scored his fourth touchdown of the game, running for 33 yards, bringing the score to 35–0. With 1:10 left in the 3rd quarter, the Aggies were able to get a safety which was the final score of the game.

The Aggies held Delaware State to 23 rushing and 100 total yards of offense. This was the program's 21st shutout victory since the 2011 season. A&T finished the game with 432 total yards of offense, of which Jah-Maine Martin was responsible for 108 yards. Martin's 4 touchdowns was the second greatest single game performance in the program's history, behind Maurice Hicks who scored 6 in 2000. Other stand out players include wide receiver Elijah Bell's 9 catches for 101 yards which set a career receiving yards record of 2,347 yards. Bell also tied programs' career receptions record at 172, placing him with Herbert Harbison and Wallace Miles.

=== At Norfolk State ===
| | 1 | 2 | 3 | 4 | Total |
|---|---|---|---|---|---|
| No. 15 Aggies | 13 | 24 | 21 | 0 | 58 |
| Spartans | 3 | 6 | 10 | 0 | 19 |

| Statistics | NCAT | NORF |
|---|---|---|
| First downs | 22 | 21 |
| Total yards | 594 | 353 |
| Rushing yards | 410 | 101 |
| Passing yards | 184 | 252 |
| Turnovers | 2 | 4 |
| Time of possession | 27:26 | 32:34 |

| Team | Category | Player | Statistics |
|---|---|---|---|
| North Carolina A&T | Passing | Kylil Carter | 9/14, 176 yards, 3 TD |
| North Carolina A&T | Rushing | Jah-Maine Carter | 10 rushes, 199 yards, 3 TD |
| North Carolina A&T | Receiving | Zachary Leslie | 4 receptions, 106 yards, 2 TD |
| Norfolk State | Passing | Juwan Carter | 24/44, 252 yards, TD, 3 INT |
| Norfolk State | Rushing | Rayquan Smith | 9 rushes, 75 yards |
| Norfolk State | Receiving | Marcque Ellington | 5 receptions, 66 yards |

This game marked the 41st meeting between the Aggies and Norfolk State. Going into the matchup, A&T led the series 31–9, with Norfolk State vacating wins in both 2010 and 2011. The Aggies have won the last 5 games of the series, with A&T winning the last meeting 37–20 in Greensboro.

The Aggies were the first to score with a 2-yard run by Jah-Maine Martin. Norfolk State was able to get their first score of the game via a 44-yard field goal by Josh Nardone. The Aggies were quick to respond with another Jah-Maine Martin touchdown. On the point after attempt, the kick was blocked, leaving the score at the end of the first quarter with the aggies ahead 13–3. In the second quarter, the Aggies were able to score 24 points with 2 touchdown passes from Kylil Carter to Quinzel Lockhart and Zachary Leslie; a 24-yard Noel Ruiz field goal and a 68-yard run by Jah-Maine Martin to lead the Aggies on a 37–3 lead. The spartans were able to score 6 points on a 2-yard pass from quarterback Juwan Carter to Justin Smith making the score 37–9 at halftime. In the third quarter, the Spartans were able to score off of a 1-yard run by Juwan Carter, followed by a 31-yard field goal by josh Nardone. A&T responded with a 68-yard touchdown pass from Kylil Carter to Zachary Leslie. A&T was able to score again with a 4-yard run by Kashon Baker ti being the score to 51–19. In the fourth quarter, quarterback Jalen Fowler ran for 4 yards for a touchdown, bringing the final score to 58–19.

=== At Florida A&M ===
| | 1 | 2 | 3 | 4 | OT | Total |
|---|---|---|---|---|---|---|
| No. 10 Aggies | 7 | 7 | 3 | 11 | 3 | 31 |
| Rattlers | 14 | 7 | 0 | 7 | 6 | 34 |

| Statistics | NCAT | FAMU |
|---|---|---|
| First downs | 28 | 17 |
| Total yards | 496 | 345 |
| Rushing yards | 180 | 76 |
| Passing yards | 316 | 269 |
| Turnovers | 1 | 1 |
| Time of possession | 39:40 | 20:20 |

| Team | Category | Player | Statistics |
|---|---|---|---|
| North Carolina A&T | Passing | Kylil Carter | 21/31, 251 yards, INT |
| North Carolina A&T | Rushing | Jah-Maine Martin | 22 rushes, 71 yards, TD |
| North Carolina A&T | Receiving | Zachary Leslie | 11 receptions, 136 yards |
| Florida A&M | Passing | Ryan Stanley | 14/24, 220 yards, 2 TD |
| Florida A&M | Rushing | Terrell Jennings | 12 rushes, 57 yards, TD |
| Florida A&M | Receiving | Xavier Smith | 5 receptions, 106 yards, TD |

This game marked the 67th meeting between North Carolina A&T and the Florida A&M Rattlers. Going into the matchup, FAMU held a 43–18 all-time record against the Aggies, with the Rattlers winning the previous year's game 22–21.

Florida A&M scored first with a 56-yard pass to Xavier Smith from Ryan Stanley. In the final 2 minutes of the quarter, A&T scored their first points of the game with a 1-yard run from Kylil Carter. On the next possession, the Rattlers scored off of a 5-yard pass to David Manigo to close out the 1st quarter 14–7. In the 2nd quarter, both teams scored 1 touchdown each; The Aggies' Jah-Maine Martin scored on a 9-yard run and FAMU's Marcus Williams scored with a 21-yard reception. At halftime, tensions between the rivals spilled over and both teams got involved in a skirmish that resulted in A&T's Elijah Bell and Mac McCain, as well as a FAMU assistant coach, being ejected from the game. The 3rd quarter saw the Aggies score the only points with Kicker Noel Ruiz making a 26-yard field goal making the score 17–21. In the 4th quarter, the Rattlers scored by way of a 2-yard run from Terrell Jennings. The Aggies scored via a 36-yard run courtesy of Kashon Baker, followed by a two-point conversion to bring the score to 25–28. With 0:02 left in regulation, kicker Noel Ruiz made a 26-yard field goal, forcing the game into overtime. In overtime, the Aggies scored a 32-yard field goal by Noel Ruiz, while the Rattlers scored the game-winning touchdown.

A&T recorded 496 yards of total offense, with 180 on the ground and 316 in the air. Quarterback Kylil Carter recorded a career-high 251 yards passing and 63 rushing yards and 1 touchdown. Other top performers include Jah-Maine Martin who rushed for 71 yards on 22 carries with 1 Touchdown; Zachary Leslie who had a career high 11 receptions for 136 yards and Antoine Wilder who recorded 9 tackles.

=== Howard ===
| | 1 | 2 | 3 | 4 | Total |
|---|---|---|---|---|---|
| Bison | 6 | 0 | 0 | 0 | 6 |
| No. 18 Aggies | 10 | 24 | 23 | 7 | 64 |

| Statistics | HOW | NCAT |
|---|---|---|
| First downs | 14 | 22 |
| Total yards | 173 | 574 |
| Rushing yards | 115 | 321 |
| Passing yards | 58 | 253 |
| Turnovers | 3 | 0 |
| Time of possession | 30:07 | 29:53 |

| Team | Category | Player | Statistics |
|---|---|---|---|
| Howard | Passing | Quinton Williams | 7/20, 58 yards, 2 INT |
| Howard | Rushing | Quinton Williams | 17 rushes, 80 yards, TD |
| Howard | Receiving | Kyle Anthony | 3 receptions, 30 yards |
| North Carolina A&T | Passing | Kylil Carter | 9/13, 176 yards, 2 TD |
| North Carolina A&T | Rushing | Jah-Maine Martin | 7 rushes, 138 yards, 3 TD |
| North Carolina A&T | Receiving | Zachary Leslie | 4 receptions, 120 yards, TD |

This game marked the 48th meeting between NC A&T and the Howard Bison, with A&T holding a 27–18–3 series record over Howard. Having played consistently since 1971, an imbalance in the MEAC football schedule created a disruption in the series. this resulted in their last meeting being in 2016 where the Aggies defeated the Bison 34–7.

On the game's opening drive, the Aggies moved the ball 50 yards in 7 plays, setting up kicker Noel Ruiz for a 27-yard field goal. On A&T's next possession, the Aggies scored in two plays when Running Back Jah-Maine Martin scored on a 65-yard run, bringing the Aggies to a 10–0 lead. On Howard's next possession, the Bison were able to put together a 78-yard drive, which resulted in Howard's only points of the game. The 2nd quarter saw the Aggies scoring 24 unanswered points, including a 55-yard touchdown run by Jah-Maine Martin which was the result of freshman linebacker Jacob Roberts making a crucial 4th down sack. After this momentum changing set of plays, the Aggies began pulling away from the Bison 34–6 at halftime. In the 2nd half of the game, A&T scored 30 unanswered points including: a 13-yard pass to Elijah Bell; a 9-yard run by Jah-Maine Martin; an 18-yard pass to Zachary Leslie; a 20-yard run by T.J. Boyce; and a 31-yard field goal by Noel Ruiz.

The Aggies recorded 574 yards of total offense, while holding Howard to 173 yards total. Running Back Jah-Main Martin rushed for 138 Yards on 7 carries and scored 3 Touchdowns. Martin increased his season total to 15 rushing touchdowns, with 10 for over 20 yards, and 7 exceeding 50 yards. Wide receiver Elijah Bell recorded 94 yards and 2 touchdowns, increasing his career total to 28. Bell who already holds the school's all-time receiving touchdown record, is now 5th on the conference's record list. In addition to the veteran players, freshman linebacker Jacob Roberts recorded a career high 15 tackles in his first homecoming game. Of those 15, Roberts had 3 sacks and 6 tackles for loss. Other notable performances included quarterback Kylil Carter passing for 176 yards and 2 touchdowns with 9 completions; receiver Zachary Leslie who recorded 120 yards and 1 touchdown with 4 receptions; and senior cornerback Chris Mosley, who had 2 interceptions.

=== At South Carolina State ===
| | 1 | 2 | 3 | 4 | Total |
|---|---|---|---|---|---|
| No. 17 Aggies | 0 | 16 | 6 | 0 | 22 |
| Bulldogs | 3 | 7 | 0 | 10 | 20 |

| Statistics | NCAT | SCST |
|---|---|---|
| First downs | 23 | 17 |
| Total yards | 417 | 379 |
| Rushing yards | 150 | 50 |
| Passing yards | 267 | 329 |
| Turnovers | 1 | 1 |
| Time of possession | 32:55 | 24:15 |

| Team | Category | Player | Statistics |
|---|---|---|---|
| North Carolina A&T | Passing | Kylil Carter | 21/38, 267 yards, TD |
| North Carolina A&T | Rushing | Kylil Carter | 19 rushes, 73 yards |
| North Carolina A&T | Receiving | Elijah Bell | 11 receptions, 107 yards |
| South Carolina State | Passing | Corey Fields | 14/30, 284 yards, TD, INT |
| South Carolina State | Rushing | Labron Morris | 9 rushes, 36 yards, TD |
| South Carolina State | Receiving | De'Montrez Burroughs | 8 receptions, 168 yards, TD |

This game marked the 54th meeting between the Aggies and the South Carolina State Bulldogs. Going into the matchup, South Carolina State leads the series 31–21–2. The Aggies are on a 4-game winning streak against the bulldogs, including a 31–16 win last season at home.

SC State scored the only points of the first quarter with a 23-yard field goal. In the second quarter, the Bulldogs scored their first touchdown on a 2-yard run, putting them up 10–0 over the Aggies. The Aggies scored their first points of the game by way of a safety when Kyin Howard tackled SC state quarterback Tyrece Nick. On the next possession, Running Back Jah-Maine Martin scored on a 3-yard run, making the score 10–9. The Bulldogs were unable to convert on their 3rd down attempt and had to punt the ball to the Aggies. On their next possession, the Aggies scored on a 4-yard pass to Korey Banks from Kylil Carter, giving the Aggies the lead 16–10 going into halftime. In the 3rd quarter, the Noel Ruiz successfully kicked 2 field goals, from 23 and 22 yards respectively increasing A&T's lead 22–10 at the end of the 3rd quarter. In the 4th quarter SC State scored 2 touchdowns; the first, a 49 Yard pass to receiver De'Mo Burroughs and the second, 28 Yard field goal by kicker Dillon Breedsen. With SC State down 20–22 on their final possession of the game, the Bulldogs were forced to punt the ball from their own 16 yard line. With the ball on the SC State 49 yard line, the Aggies gained 18 yards in 6 plays as time expired.

The Aggies recorded a total 417 yards of offense, while the defense held SC State to 50 rushing yards and only 6 of 14 on 3rd down conversions. Aggie quarterback Kylil Carter recorded a career high 267 passing yards with 21 completions and 1 Touchdown. In addition, Carter also rushed for a team high 73 yards and accounted for 57 of 79 plays for the Aggies. Other standouts performances include: Kicker Noel Ruiz, who broke the school's single-season field goal record with 16, and running back Jah-Maine Martin who became the 9th player in the program's history to rush for over 1,000 yards in a single season.

=== At Morgan State ===
| | 1 | 2 | 3 | 4 | Total |
|---|---|---|---|---|---|
| No. 14 Aggies | 3 | 7 | 3 | 3 | 16 |
| Bears | 0 | 16 | 0 | 6 | 22 |

| Statistics | NCAT | MORG |
|---|---|---|
| First downs | 20 | 16 |
| Total yards | 283 | 307 |
| Rushing yards | 129 | 89 |
| Passing yards | 154 | 218 |
| Turnovers | 2 | 1 |
| Time of possession | 33:33 | 26:27 |

| Team | Category | Player | Statistics |
|---|---|---|---|
| North Carolina A&T | Passing | Kylil Carter | 15/38, 154 yards, TD, 2 INT |
| North Carolina A&T | Rushing | Jah-Maine Martin | 16 rushes, 80 yards |
| North Carolina A&T | Receiving | Quinzel Lockhart | 4 receptions, 69 yards |
| Morgan State | Passing | DeAndre Harris | 14/20, 218 yards, TD, INT |
| Morgan State | Rushing | DeAndre Harris | 12 rushes, 47 yards, TD |
| Morgan State | Receiving | Manasseh Bailey | 7 receptions, 118 yards, TD |

This game marked the 80th meeting between North Carolina A&T and Morgan State. Since 1930, Morgan State held a 43–36 record against the Aggies, with the bears winning the last 2 meetings, including the previous years' 16–13 upset over the Aggies, which ended their 15-game winning streak.

The Aggies were able to score first with a 34-yard field goal by Kicker Noel Ruiz. The bears were unable to score and the quarter ended with the Aggies ahead 3–0. In the second quarter, the Bears were able to score with a 22-yard field goal by kicker Nicolas O'shea. Morgan State was able to regain possession of the ball after a 3rd down interception from the Bears 25 yard line. 4 plays later, the Bears scored the first touchdown of the game on a 2-yard run giving them a 10–3 lead. A&T were able to score a touchdown of their own from a 10-yard pass from Kylil Carter to Zachery Leslie, tying the score 10–10. On the next possession, the Bears scored on a 27-yard pass to Manasseah Bailey. After the half, A&T scored the only points of the 3rd quarter. A&T kicker Noel Ruiz made a 28-yard field goal bringing the score 13–16. In the 4th quarter, Morgan State scored a touchdown from a 1-yard run and increased their lead 13–22. A&T followed up on the next possession with a 46-yard field goal. On the subsequent kickoff, the Aggies recovered an onside kick at their own 45 yard line. A&T mounded an unsuccessful final offense, which ended with quarterback Kylil Carter getting sacked on the Aggie's 38 yard line.

The Aggies recorded a total 283 yards of offense. Kylil Carter recorded 154 passing yards and completed only 15 of 38 attempts for 1 touchdown and 2 interceptions. Running Back Jah-Maine Martin was held to only 80 rushing yards on 16 Carries.

=== Bethune–Cookman ===
| | 1 | 2 | 3 | 4 | Total |
|---|---|---|---|---|---|
| Wildcats | 0 | 10 | 0 | 7 | 17 |
| No. 25 Aggies | 14 | 6 | 6 | 21 | 47 |

| Statistics | BCU | NCAT |
|---|---|---|
| First downs | 10 | 20 |
| Total yards | 229 | 430 |
| Rushing yards | 110 | 300 |
| Passing yards | 119 | 130 |
| Turnovers | 1 | 0 |
| Time of possession | 26:31 | 33:29 |

| Team | Category | Player | Statistics |
|---|---|---|---|
| Bethune–Cookman | Passing | Akevious Williams | 10/22, 119 yards |
| Bethune–Cookman | Rushing | Akevious Williams | 13 rushes, 45 yards, TD |
| Bethune–Cookman | Receiving | Steffon Francois | 2 receptions, 52 yards |
| North Carolina A&T | Passing | Jalen Fowler | 5/6, 105 yards, 2 TD |
| North Carolina A&T | Rushing | Jah-Maine Martin | 19 rushes, 120 yards, 3 TD |
| North Carolina A&T | Receiving | Elijah Bell | 4 receptions, 62 yards, TD |

This game marked the 40th meeting between North Carolina A&T and Bethune-Cookman. Going into the game, Bethune-Cookman held a 22–17 all-time record against the Aggies, with the A&T winning the last 4 meetings, including the previous years 42–20 victory in Daytona Beach.

In the first quarter, running back Jah-Maine Martin scored the first points of the game with a 66-yard run. He scored again on an 8-yard run with 8:57 left in the quarter. In the second quarter, Aggie fullback William Simpson scored the first touchdown of his career on a fourth-and-1 run from the 6 yard line. The Wildcats scored their first points of the game when LaDerrian scored a touchdown off of a 1-yard run. The Wildcats closed the half with a 25-yard field goal by kicker Xavier McDonald. In the second half of the game, A&T's Kashon Baker score the only points of the 3rd quarter with a 36-yard pass from quarterback Jalen Fowler. In the 4th quarter, Fowler threw a 22-yard pass to receiver Elijah Bell for a touchdown, bringing the score to 26–10 in favor of the Aggies. B-CU responded with a 9-yard run by Akevious Williams making the score 33–17. A&T's Jah-Main Martin and Kashon Baker both scored on running plays to seal the Wildcats fate; Martin on a 7-yard run and Baker scoring on a 2-yard play.

The Aggies recorded 430 yards of total offense, while holding B-CU to 229 yards and 5 of 16 on third down conversions. Jah-Maine Martin was responsible for 120 yards of offense, on 19 carries for 3 Touchdowns. Martin's performance during the game broke the school season record for rushing touchdowns, and tied him for the single season touchdown record, both held by Tarik Cohen. In addition to Martin, other standouts included quarterback Jalen Fowler, who had 5 of 6 completions and threw for 105 for 2 touchdowns, receiver Elijah Bell who had 4 caught for 62 yards and 1 touchdown, running back Kashon Baker, who had 76 yards and 1 touchdown on 13 carries. On the defensive side, lineman Joe Stuckey recorded 6 tackles, 1 sack and a fumble recovery while Najee Reams recorded 6 solo tackles.

=== North Carolina Central ===
| | 1 | 2 | 3 | 4 | Total |
|---|---|---|---|---|---|
| Eagles | 0 | 0 | 0 | 0 | 0 |
| No. 25 Aggies | 16 | 14 | 24 | 0 | 54 |

| Statistics | NCCU | NCAT |
|---|---|---|
| First downs | 4 | 20 |
| Total yards | 9 | 520 |
| Rushing yards | -6 | 343 |
| Passing yards | 15 | 177 |
| Turnovers | 2 | 0 |
| Time of possession | 27:16 | 32:44 |

| Team | Category | Player | Statistics |
|---|---|---|---|
| North Carolina Central | Passing | Davius Richard | 3/12, 13 yards |
| North Carolina Central | Rushing | Davious Richards | 14 rushes, 8 yards |
| North Carolina Central | Receiving | Xavier McKoy | 2 receptions, 11 yards |
| North Carolina A&T | Passing | Kylil Carter | 4/8, 161 yards, 2 TD |
| North Carolina A&T | Rushing | Jah-Maine Martin | 11 rushes, 122 yards, 2 TD |
| North Carolina A&T | Receiving | Elijah Bell | 3 receptions, 109 yards, 2 TD |

This game marked the 91st game in the rivalry between North Carolina A&T and In-state conference member North Carolina Central. Going into the game, the Aggies held a 50–34 all-time record against the Eagles, including a 45–0 victory in Durham which secured a bid to the 2018 Celebration Bowl.

The Aggies first score came from a 68-yard pass from quarterback Kylil Carter to wide receiver Elijah Bell. The Aggies ended the first quarter scoring 16 unanswered points, including a 20-yard Touchdown run by running back Jah-Maine Martin and a 35-yard field goal by kicker Noel Ruiz. In the 2nd quarter, Martin again scored on a 55-yard run. His two touchdown performance set a new single-season school record at 21, previously held by Tarik Cohen. A&T closed out the half with a 2-yard run by Kashon Baker, increasing the Aggies' lead 30–0. In the 3rd quarter, the Aggies scored 21 unanswered points, extending their lead 54–0. Noel Ruiz scored on a 33-yard field goal, while Elijah Bell scored on a 32-yard pass from Kylil Carter. A&T score on two more plays to finish off their rivals; Kashon Baker scored on a 5-yard run and quarterback Kingsley Ifedi ran for 34 yards for the last score of the game. The Aggies got 520 yards of total offense, while holding the Eagles to a total of 9 yards. Individual stand out performances include Jah-Maine Martin, who rushed for 122 yards and 2 touchdowns and Elijah Bell, who had 109 receiving yards on 3 receptions and 2 touchdowns. The Aggies' performance was the largest margin of victory in the history of the rivalry between the two programs.

=== Vs. Alcorn State (Celebration Bowl) ===
| | 1 | 2 | 3 | 4 | Total |
|---|---|---|---|---|---|
| Braves | 3 | 7 | 21 | 13 | 44 |
| No. 23 Aggies | 0 | 24 | 28 | 12 | 64 |

| Statistics | ALCN | NCAT |
|---|---|---|
| First downs | 24 | 21 |
| Total yards | 460 | 574 |
| Rushing yards | 119 | 210 |
| Passing yards | 341 | 364 |
| Turnovers | 1 | 2 |
| Time of possession | 29:36 | 30:24 |

| Team | Category | Player | Statistics |
|---|---|---|---|
| Alcorn State | Passing | Felix Harper | 25/42, 341 yards, 3 TD, INT |
| Alcorn State | Rushing | De'Shawn Waller | 13 rushes, 59 yards, TD |
| Alcorn State | Receiving | Chris Blair | 7 receptions, 150 yards, TD |
| North Carolina A&T | Passing | Kylil Carter | 18/30, 364 yards, 6 TD |
| North Carolina A&T | Rushing | Jah-Maine Martin | 15 rushes, 110 yards, 2 TD |
| North Carolina A&T | Receiving | Korey Banks | 6 receptions, 122 yards, 2 TD |

This game marks the 5th Celebration Bowl and the 4th meeting between A&T and Alcorn State from the Southwestern Athletic Conference. The Aggies are 3–1 against the Braves, whom they beat 41–34 in the inaugural Celebration Bowl, and 24–22 in last year's game.

Quarterback Kylil Carter, in his final game for A&T, recorded 460 yards of total offense, with 364 yards passing which resulted in 6 touchdowns. In addition to setting Celebration Bowl single-game records in those categories, Carter was 12 yards shy of breaking the A&T single-game passing record. Carter was able to break the program's single-game total offense record and tied Alan Hooker's single-game touchdown pass record. In addition to Carter, other Aggie standouts include: Running Back Jah-Maine Martin, who recorded 110 rushing yards and 2 touchdowns on 15 carries and wide receiver Korey Banks, who made 6 receptions for 122 yards and 2 touchdowns.

== Postseason ==
In the weeks following the finale of the 2019 MEAC regular season, many organizations began to announce finalists and winners of various post-season awards and honors. several players for the Aggies, were honored with postseason awards and accolades including redshirt senior offensive lineman Marcus Pettiford, Redshirt Junior Running Back Jah-Maine Martin, and Junior Kicker Noel Ruiz.

Marcus Pettiford was named MEAC Offensive Lineman of the year. He was also named to the American Football Coaches Association FCS Coaches' All-America 1st team. In addition to that honor, Pettiford was also named to the BOXTOROW All-America team, STATS FCS, AP FCS, and Hero Sports All-America 2nd Teams. Jah-Maine Martin was named the FCS Offensive Player of the Year by HBCU Gameday. In addition to that honor, Martin was named a finalist for the Black College Football Hall of Fame Player of the Year and the Walter Payton awards. lastly, Martin was also named to the BOXTOROW All-America, STATS FCS, AP FCS, and Hero Sports All-America 2nd teams. Noel Ruiz was the Special Teams Player of the Year by BOXTOROW. In addition to that honor, Ruiz was named to the AFCA Coaches All-America 1st team. In addition to the previously mentioned players, Redshirt Sophomore Center Dacquari Wilson was named to the BOXTOROW All-America team and freshman linebacker Jacob Roberts was named a finalist for the Jerry Rice Award, which is awarded annually to the most outstanding freshman player in the FCS.

The following A&T players were also named to the All–MEAC First, Second, and Third Teams:

All-MEAC First Team
- Jah-Maine Martin, R-Jr, RB
- Marcus Pettiford, R-Sr, OL
- Noel Ruiz, Jr, PK
- Dacquari Wilson, R-So, C

All-MEAC Second Team
- Elijah Bell, Sr, WR
- Justin Cates, Gr, DL
- Kyin Howard, R-So, LB
- Dontae Keys, R-Jr, OL
- Mac McMcain III, R-Jr, DB
- Jermaine McDaniel, R-So, DL
- Michael Rivers, So, P
- Jacob Roberts, Fr, LB

All-MEAC Third Team
- Devin Harrell, R-So, DL
- De'jour Simpson, R-Jr, OL
- Joseph Stuckey, So, LB
- Antoine Wilder, R-Sr, DB

== Ranking movements ==
Ranking movements Legend: ██ Increase in ranking ██ Decrease in ranking т = Tied with team above or below
| | Week | | | | | | | | | | | | | | |
| Poll | Pre | 1 | 2 | 3 | 4 | 5 | 6 | 7 | 8 | 9 | 10 | 11 | 12 | 13 | Final |
|---|---|---|---|---|---|---|---|---|---|---|---|---|---|---|---|
| STATS | 20 | 15 | 15 | 16 | 17 | 15 | 13 | 10 | 18 | 16 | 14 | 25 | 25 | 23 | 20 |
| Coaches | 19 | 14 | 17 | 17 | 18 | 16 | 14 | 11 | 18 | 16 | 15T | 25 | 24 | 22 | 23 |
