= 2019 Howard Bison football team =

American college football season

2019 Howard Bison football
- Conference: Mid-Eastern Athletic Conference
- Record: 2–10 (2–6 MEAC)
- Head coach: Ron Prince (1st season; first 9 games); Aaron Kelton (interim, final 3 games)
- Defensive coordinator: Elijah Sandwiess (1st season)
- Home stadium: William H. Greene Stadium

2019 Mid-Eastern Athletic Conference football standings
	Conf.			Overall
Team	W		L	W		L
No. 24 Florida A&M *	7	–	1	9	–	2
No. 20 North Carolina A&T +	6	–	2	9	–	3
South Carolina State +	6	–	2	8	–	3
Bethune–Cookman	5	–	3	7	–	4
Norfolk State	4	–	4	5	–	7
North Carolina Central	3	–	5	4	–	8
Howard	2	–	6	2	–	10
Morgan State	2	–	6	3	–	9
Delaware State	1	–	7	2	–	10
+ – Conference co-champions; * Florida A&M ineligible for conference title due to NCAA sanctions; Rankings from STATS Poll

The 2019 Howard Bison football team represented Howard University as a member Mid-Eastern Athletic Conference (MEAC) during the 2019 NCAA Division I FCS football season. The Bison were led by first-year head coach Ron Prince until he was placed on administrative leave prior to the team's November 9 game, with director of football operations Aaron Kelton named as interim head coach. Howard finished the season with an overall record of 2–10 and mark of 2–6 in conference play, tying for seventh place in the MEAC. The team played home games at William H. Greene Stadium in Washington, D.C.

== Preseason ==
=== MEAC poll ===
In the MEAC preseason poll released on July 26, 2019, the Bison were predicted to finish in fourth place.

=== Preseason All–MEAC teams ===
The Bison had nine different players selected to the preseason all-MEAC teams.

First Team Offense

Caylin Newton – QB

Dedrick Parson – RB

Jequez Ezzard – WR

Kyle Anthony – WR

Second Team Offense

Malik Hyatt – TE

Second Team Defense

Marcellos Allison – DL

Zamon Robinson – DL

Tye Freeland – DB

Third Team Defense

Aaron Walker – DB

Dedrick Parson – RS

== Schedule ==
Date	Time	Opponent	Site	TV	Result	Attendance
August 31	12:00 p.m.	at Maryland*	Maryland Stadium; College Park, MD	BTN	L 0–79	32,761
September 7	2:00 p.m.	at Youngstown State*	Stambaugh Stadium; Youngstown, OH	ESPN+	L 28–54	12,390
September 14	4:30 p.m.	vs. Hampton*	Soldier Field; Chicago, IL (The Real HU)	NBC 5 Chicago	L 20–41	19,425
September 21	2:00 p.m.	at Delaware State	Alumni Stadium; Dover, DE	ESPN3	W 24–9	4,142
September 28	1:00 p.m.	Bethune–Cookman	William H. Greene Stadium; Washington, DC	ESPN3	L 29–37	5,700
October 5	1:00 p.m.	at Harvard*	Harvard Stadium; Boston, MA	ESPN+	L 17–62	8,234
October 12	1:00 p.m.	Norfolk State	William H. Greene Stadium; Washington, DC	ESPN3	L 21–49	7,532
October 26	1:00 p.m.	at No. 18 North Carolina A&T	BB&T Stadium; Greensboro, NC	ESPN3	L 6–64	21,500
November 2	1:00 p.m.	North Carolina Central	William H. Greene Stadium; Washington, DC	ESPN3	L 6–28	1,096
November 9	1:30 p.m.	at South Carolina State	Oliver C. Dawson Stadium; Orangeburg, SC	ESPN3	L 21–62	8,515
November 16	4:00 p.m.	at No. 12 Florida A&M	Bragg Memorial Stadium; Tallahassee, FL	ESPN3	L 7–39	8,979
November 23	1:00 p.m.	Morgan State	William H. Greene Stadium; Washington, DC (rivalry)	ESPN3	W 20–15	989
*Non-conference game; Rankings from STATS Poll released prior to the game; All times are in Eastern time

== Game summaries ==
=== At Maryland ===
	1	2	3	4	Total
Bison	0	0	0	0	0
Terrapins	28	28	16	7	79

=== At Youngstown State ===
	1	2	3	4	Total
Bison	14	0	7	7	28
Penguins	6	21	20	7	54

=== Hampton ===
	1	2	3	4	Total
Bison	3	10	0	7	20
Pirates	0	20	14	7	41

=== At Delaware State ===
	1	2	3	4	Total
Bison	0	18	0	6	24
Hornets	7	2	0	0	9

=== Bethune–Cookman ===
	1	2	3	4	Total
Wildcats	21	3	0	13	37
Bison	7	0	7	15	29

=== At Harvard ===
	1	2	3	4	Total
Bison	3	0	7	7	17
Crimson	7	34	14	7	62

=== Norfolk State ===
	1	2	3	4	Total
Spartans	14	14	14	7	49
Bison	7	14	0	0	21

=== At North Carolina A&T ===
	1	2	3	4	Total
Bison	6	0	0	0	6
No. 18 Aggies	10	24	23	7	64

=== North Carolina Central ===
	1	2	3	4	Total
Eagles	0	7	7	14	28
Bison	0	0	0	6	6

=== At South Carolina State ===
	1	2	3	4	Total
Bison	0	7	7	7	21
Bulldogs	20	14	21	7	62

=== At Florida A&M ===
	1	2	3	4	Total
Bison	0	0	0	7	7
No. 12 Rattlers	3	14	22	0	39

=== Morgan State ===
	1	2	3	4	Total
Bears	8	0	0	7	15
Bison	0	7	7	6	20
