= 2019 Morgan State Bears football team =

American college football season

2019 Morgan State Bears football
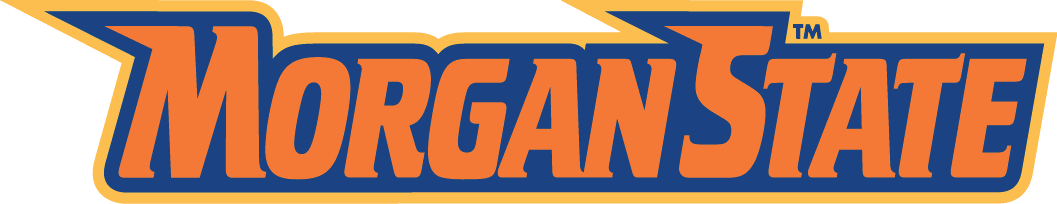
- Conference: Mid-Eastern Athletic Conference
- Record: 3–9 (2–6 MEAC)
- Head coach: Tyrone Wheatley (1st season)
- Offensive coordinator: Travis Manger (2nd season)
- Defensive coordinator: Antonio James (2nd season)
- Home stadium: Hughes Stadium

2019 Mid-Eastern Athletic Conference football standings
	Conf.			Overall
Team	W		L	W		L
No. 24 Florida A&M *	7	–	1	9	–	2
No. 20 North Carolina A&T +	6	–	2	9	–	3
South Carolina State +	6	–	2	8	–	3
Bethune–Cookman	5	–	3	7	–	4
Norfolk State	4	–	4	5	–	7
North Carolina Central	3	–	5	4	–	8
Howard	2	–	6	2	–	10
Morgan State	2	–	6	3	–	9
Delaware State	1	–	7	2	–	10
+ – Conference co-champions; * Florida A&M ineligible for conference title due to NCAA sanctions; Rankings from STATS Poll

The 2019 Morgan State Bears football team represented Morgan State University in the 2019 NCAA Division I FCS football season. They were led by first-year head coach Tyrone Wheatley. The Bears played their home games at Hughes Stadium and were a member of the Mid-Eastern Athletic Conference (MEAC). They finished the season 3–9, 2–6 in MEAC play to finish in a tie for seventh place.

== Preseason ==
=== MEAC preseason poll ===
In a vote of the MEAC head coaches and sports information directors, released at the conference's media day on July 26, the Bears were picked to finish in eight place and received one first place vote.

=== Preseason All-MEAC Team ===
The Bears had ten players selected to the preseason all-MEAC teams.

Offense

1st team

Xavier Gravette – TE

2nd team

Stefan Touani – OL

3rd team

Josh Chase – RB

Bruce Trigg – OL

Defense

1st team

Rico Kennedy – LB

2nd team

Ian McBorrough – LB

Donte Small – DB

3rd team

Devan Hebron – DL

Dominick Trigg – DB

Specialists

3rd team

Nicholas O'Shea – PK

== Schedule ==
Date	Time	Opponent	Site	TV	Result	Attendance
August 29	7:00 p.m.	at Bowling Green*	Doyt Perry Stadium; Bowling Green, OH	ESPN3	L 3–46	17,620
September 14	3:00 p.m.	at No. 2 James Madison*	Bridgeforth Stadium; Harrisonburg, VA	NBCS WA	L 12–63	19,777
September 21	12:00 p.m.	at Army*	Michie Stadium; West Point, NY	CBSSN	L 21–52	28,018
September 28	6:00 p.m.	North Carolina Central	Hughes Stadium; Baltimore, MD	ESPN3	L 17–27	7,609
October 5	4:00 p.m.	at Bethune–Cookman	Daytona Stadium; Daytona Beach, FL	ESPN3	L 20–31	5,642
October 12	1:00 p.m.	Delaware State^{†}	Hughes Stadium; Baltimore, MD	ESPN3	W 34–3	8,762
October 19	1:30 p.m.	at South Carolina State	Oliver C. Dawson Stadium; Orangeburg, SC	ESPN3	L 10–24	12,121
October 26	3:00 p.m.	No. 20 Florida A&M	Hughes Stadium; Baltimore, MD	ESPN3	L 12–24	2,786
November 2	2:00 p.m.	at Norfolk State	William "Dick" Price Stadium; Norfolk, VA	ESPN3	L 0–48	20,178
November 9	1:00 p.m.	No. 14 North Carolina A&T	Hughes Stadium; Baltimore, MD	ESPN3	W 22–16	2,467
November 16	1:00 p.m.	Virginia–Lynchburg	Hughes Stadium; Baltimore, MD	ESPN3	W 59–26	2,450
November 23	1:00 p.m.	at Howard	William H. Greene Stadium; Washington, D.C. (rivalry)	ESPN3	L 15–20	989
*Non-conference game; ^{†}Homecoming; Rankings from STATS Poll released prior to the game; All times are in Eastern time

== Game summaries ==
=== At Bowling Green ===
Morgan State Bears at Bowling Green Falcons

Quarter	1	2	3	4	Total
Bears	0	3	0	0	3
Falcons	13	17	7	9	46

at Doyt Perry Stadium, Bowling Green, OH

- Date: August 29, 2019
- Game time: 7:00 PM EDT
- Game weather: Temperature: 79 °F (26 °C) • Wind: SW 13 mph • Weather: Sunny/Partly Cloudy
- Game attendance: 17,620
- Referee: J. Valentine
- TV announcers (ESPN3): Jim Barbar (Play-by-play) & John Gregory (color)
- ESPN – Darius Wade leads Bowling Green past Morgan State 46–3 /// Box Score, Morgan State at Bowling Green /// Pregame Notes /// Postgame Notes

Game information

First Quarter

- (11:07) BGSU TD – Andrew Clair 3-yard rush, Nate Needham kick
  Drive: 12 plays, 76 yards, 3:53; Bowling Green 7–0
- (01:32) BGSU TD – Quintin Morris 2-yard pass from Darius Wade, Nate Needham kick failed
  Drive: 5 plays, 40 yards, 2:04; Bowling Green 13–0

Second Quarter

- (12:32) BGSU FG – Nate Needham 24-yard field goal
  Drive: 7 plays, 36 yards, 2:28; Bowling Green 16–0
- (07:01) BGSU TD – Quintin Morris 27-yard pass from Darius Wade, Nate Needham kick
  Drive: 9 plays, 68 yards, 3:27; Bowling Green 23–0
- (05:23) BGSU TD – Davon Jones 1-yard rush, Nate Needham kick
  Drive: 3 plays, 24 yards, 1:02; Bowling Green 30–0
- (01:24) MSU FG – Nicholas O'Shea 27-yard field goal
  Drive: 4 plays, 25 yards, 1:19; Bowling Green 30–3

Third Quarter

- (02:07) BGSU TD – Davon Jones 7-yard pass from Darius Wade, Nate Needham kick
  Drive: 13 plays, 85 yards, 5:34; Bowling Green 37–3

Fourth Quarter

- (11:52) BGSU TD – Christian Sims 18-yard pass from Grant Loy, Nate Needham kick
  Drive: 9 plays, 80 yards, 2:55; Bowling Green 44–3
- (01:38) BGSU SF – Andrew Bench 4-yard sack safety
  Drive: 0 plays, 0 yards, 0:00; Bowling Green 46–3

Passing

- MSU – DJ Golatt Jr.: 3/9, 24 yards
- BGSU – Darius Wade: 22/32, 253 yards, 3 TD

Rushing

- MSU – Lavelton Williams: 12 carries, 41 yards
- BGSU – Andrew Clair: 14 carries, 86 yards, 1 TD

Receiving

- MSU – Juane Robinson: 1 reception, 14 yards
- BGSU – Julian Ortega–Jones: 5 receptions, 69 yards

=== At James Madison ===
Morgan State Bears at No. 2 James Madison Dukes

Quarter	1	2	3	4	Total
Bears	0	3	0	9	12
No. 2 Dukes	7	21	0	35	63

at Bridgeforth Stadium, Harrisonburg, VA

- Date: September 14, 2019
- Game time: 3:30 PM EDT
- Game weather: Temperature: 79 °F (26 °C) • Wind: 10 mph • Weather: Mostly clear–cloudy
- Game attendance: 19,777
- Referee: Nate Black
- TV announcers (NBCS WA): Curt Dudley (Play-by-play) & Dorian Brooks (color)
- ESPN – DiNucci throws 4 TD passes in James Madison's 63–12 win /// Box Score, Morgan State at James Madison /// Pregame Notes /// Postgame Notes

Game information

First Quarter

- (09:22) JMU TD – Devin Ravenel 9-yard pass from Ben DiNucci, Ethan Ratke kick
  Drive: 8 plays, 39 yards, 3:27; James Madison 7–0

Second Quarter

- (14:57) JMU TD – Percy Agyei-Obese 1-yard rush, Ethan Ratke kick
  Drive: 8 plays, 51 yards, 2:47; James Madison 14–0
- (12:05) JMU TD – Brandon Polk 48-yard pass from Ben DiNucci, Ethan Ratke kick
  Drive: 2 plays, 59 yards, 0:35; James Madison 21–0
- (08:00) MSU FG – Nicholas O'Shea 39-yard field goal
  Drive: 7 plays, 58 yards, 4:01; James Madison 21–3
- (06:16) JMU TD – Jawon Hamilton 50-yard pass from Ben DiNucci, Ethan Ratke kick
  Drive: 4 plays, 75 yards, 1:44; James Madison 28–3
- (00:33) JMU TD – Solomon Vanhorse 19-yard pass from Ben DiNucci, Ethan Ratke kick
  Drive: 2 plays, 47 yards, 0:22; James Madison 35–3

Third Quarter

- (12:51) JMU TD – Percy Agyei-Obese 5-yard rush, Ethan Ratke kick
  Drive: 6 plays, 36 yards, 2:09; James Madison 42–3
- (01:00) JMU TD – Kevin Curry Jr. 7-yard pass from Gage Moloney, Ethan Ratke kick
  Drive: 11 plays, 75 yards, 3:37; James Madison 49–3

Fourth Quarter

- (09:36) MSU FG – Nicholas O'Shea 25-yard field goal
  Drive: 11 plays, 76 yards, 6:19; James Madison 49–6
- (09:29) JMU TD – Devin Ravenel 43-yard kickoff return, Ethan Ratke kick
  Drive: 0 plays, 0 yards, 0:00; James Madison 56–6
- (08:46) MSU TD – Manasseh Bailey 72-yard pass from DeAndre Harris, Nicholas O'Shea kick blocked
  Drive: 2 plays, 75 yards, 0:43; James Madison 56–12
- (03:00) JMU TD – Eric Kirlew 9-yard pass from Cole Johnson, Ethan Ratke kick
  Drive: 13 plays, 74 yards, 5:42; James Madison 63–12

Passing

- MSU – DeAndre Harris: 11/21, 253 yards, 1 TD, 1 INT
- JMU – Ben DiNucci: 18/23, 240 yards, 4 TD

Rushing

- MSU – Jabriel Johnson: 16 carries, 50 yards
- JMU – Latrele Palmer: 8 carries, 58 yards

Receiving

- MSU – Manasseh Bailey: 4 receptions, 172 yards, 1 TD
- JMU – Brandon Polk: 6 receptions, 67 yards, 1 TD

=== At Army ===
Morgan State Bears at Army Black Knights

Quarter	1	2	3	4	Total
Bears	14	0	7	0	21
Black Knights	7	17	7	21	52

at Michie Stadium, West Point, NY

- Date: September 21, 2019
- Game time: 12:00 PM EDT
- Game attendance: 28,018
- Referee: Marcus Woods
- TV announcers (CBSSN): Ben Holden (Play-by-play), Ross Tucker (color) & Tina Cervasio (sideline)
- ESPN – Army beats Morgan State 52–21 heading into bye week /// Box Score, Morgan State at Army /// Pregame Notes /// Postgame Notes

Game information

First Quarter

- (06:50) ARMY TD – Artice Hobbs IV 9-yard rush, David Cooper kick
  Drive: 9 plays, 77 yards, 4:58; Army 7–0
- (05:32) MSU TD – Manasseh Bailey 69-yard pass from DeAndre Harris, Nicholas O'Shea kick
  Drive: 3 plays, 65 yards, 1:18; Tied 7–7
- (03:29) MSU TD – Jabriel Johnson 25-yard rush, Nicholas O'Shea kick
  Drive: 1 play, 25 yards, 0:08; Morgan State 14–7

Second Quarter

- (14:54) ARMY TD – Sandon McCoy 11-yard rush, David Cooper kick
  Drive: 9 plays, 75 yards, 3:28; Tied 14–14
- (10:17) ARMY FG – David Cooper 35-yard field goal
  Drive: 8 plays, 13 yards, 3:37; Army 17–14
- (07:26) ARMY TD – Artice Hobbs IV 80-yard pass from Christian Anderson, David Cooper kick
  Drive: 1 play, 80 yards, 0:13; Army 24–14

Third Quarter

- (10:34) ARMY TD – Connor Slomka 3-yard rush, David Cooper kick
  Drive: 10 plays, 65 yards, 4:17; Army 31–14
- (03:47) MSU TD – Manasseh Bailey 23-yard pass from DeAndre Harris, Nicholas O'Shea kick
  Drive: 15 plays, 75 yards, 6:47; Army 31–21

Fourth Quarter

- (14:56) ARMY TD – Cade Barnard 3-yard rush, David Cooper kick
  Drive: 8 plays, 71 yards, 3:41; Army 38–21
- (10:11) ARMY TD – Rashaad Bolton 1-yard rush, David Cooper kick
  Drive: 2 plays, 5 yards, 0:29; Army 45–21
- (01:48) ARMY TD – Anthony Adkins 1-yard rush, Andrew Bagley kick
  Drive: 14 plays, 61 yards, 7:37; Army 52–21

Passing

- MSU – DeAndre Harris: 15/29, 230 yards, 2 TD, 3 INT
- ARMY – Christian Anderson: 1/7, 80 yards, 1 TD

Rushing

- MSU – Jabriel Johnson: 11 carries, 47 yards, 1 TD
- ARMY – Connor Slomka: 18 carries, 110 yards, 1 TD

Receiving

- MSU – Manasseh Bailey: 6 receptions, 121 yards, 2 TD
- ARMY – Artice Hobbs IV: 1 reception, 80 yards, 1 TD

=== North Carolina Central ===
North Carolina Central Eagles at Morgan State Bears

Quarter	1	2	3	4	Total
Eagles	0	13	7	7	27
Bears	0	3	7	7	17

at Hughes Stadium, Baltimore, MD

- Date: September 28, 2019
- Game time: 6:00 PM EDT
- Game weather: Temperature: 85 °F (29 °C) • Weather: Clear Skies
- Game attendance: 7,609
- Referee: Eric Greene
- TV announcers (ESPN3): Phil Shoener (Play-by-play) & Emory Hunt (analyst)
- ESPN – NC Central controls the line in 27–17 win over Morgan State /// Box Score, North Carolina Central at Morgan State /// Pregame Notes /// Postgame Notes

Game information

First Quarter
No scoring
Second Quarter

- (12:58) MSU FG – Nicholas O'Shea 21-yard field goal
  Drive: 6 plays, 60 yards, 2:42; Morgan State 3–0
- (10:16) NCCU TD – Latrell Collier 1-yard rush, Adrian Olivo kick failed
  Drive: 6 plays, 59 yards, 2:30; North Carolina Central 6–3
- (01:21) NCCU TD – Davius Richard 62-yard rush, Adrian Olivo kick
  Drive: 4 plays, 80 yards, 0:49; North Carolina Central 13–3

Third Quarter

- (13:33) MSU TD – Malachi Washington 35-yard fumble recovery, Nicholas O'Shea kick
  Drive: 0 plays, 0 yards, 0:00; North Carolina Central 13–10
- (03:07) NCCU TD – Davius Richard 6-yard rush, Adrian Olivo kick
  Drive: 9 plays, 54 yards, 3:30; North Carolina Central 20–10

Fourth Quarter

- (11:59) NCCU TD – Latrell Collier 43-yard rush, Adrian Olivo kick
  Drive: 5 plays, 77 yards, 2:41; North Carolina Central 27–10
- (09:11) MSU TD – Manasseh Bailey 18-yard pass from DJ Golatt Jr., Nicholas O'Shea kick
  Drive: 7 plays, 70 yards, 2:44; North Carolina Central 27–17

Passing

- NCCU – Davius Richard: 7/17, 86 yards
- MSU – DeAndre Harris: 9/14, 67 yards, 2 INT

Rushing

- NCCU – Isaiah Totten: 26 carries, 112 yards
- MSU – Jabriel Johnson: 8 carries, 79 yards

Receiving

- NCCU – Xavier McKoy: 2 receptions, 33 yards
- MSU – Xavier Gravette: 5 receptions, 58 yards

=== At Bethune−Cookman ===
Morgan State Bears at Bethune−Cookman Wildcats

Quarter	1	2	3	4	Total
Bears	0	6	0	14	20
Wildcats	3	7	14	7	31

at Daytona Stadium, Daytona Beach, FL

- Date: October 5, 2019
- Game time: 4:00 PM EDT
- Game weather: Temperature: 85 °F (29 °C) • Wind: ENE 15 mph • Weather: Mostly Cloudy
- Game attendance: 5,642
- TV announcers (ESPN3): Dave LaMont (Play-by-play) & Jay Walker (analyst)
- ESPN – Williams accounts for 4 TDs, Bethune–Cookman tops Morgan St. /// Box Score, Morgan State at Bethune–Cookman /// Pregame Notes /// Postgame Notes

Game information

First Quarter

- (02:04) BCU FG – Xavier McDonald 39-yard field goal
  Drive: 11 plays, 52 yards, 5:19; Bethune–Cookman 3–0

Second Quarter

- (10:37) MSU FG – Nicholas O'Shea 25-yard field goal
  Drive: 14 plays, 67 yards, 6:27; Tied 3–3
- (03:07) BCU TD – Akevious Williams 64-yard rush, Xavier McDonald kick
  Drive: 1 play, 64 yards, 0:12; Bethune–Cookman 10–3
- (00:07) MSU FG – Nicholas O'Shea 40-yard field goal
  Drive: 7 plays, 37 yards, 0:56; Bethune–Cookman 10–6

Third Quarter

- (13:19) BCU TD – Jimmie Robinson 70-yard pass from Akevious Williams, Xavier McDonald kick
  Drive: 3 plays, 68 yards, 1:37; Bethune–Cookman 17–6
- (07:42) BCU TD – Jimmie Robinson 6-yard pass from Akevious Williams, Xavier McDonald kick
  Drive: 9 plays, 71 yards, 3:07; Bethune–Cookman 24–6

Fourth Quarter

- (11:06) MSU TD – DeAndre Harris 1-yard rush, Nicholas O'Shea kick
  Drive: 12 plays, 73 yards, 4:40; Bethune–Cookman 24–13
- (04:40) BCU TD – Jimmie Robinson 44-yard pass from Akevious Williams, Xavier McDonald kick
  Drive: 5 plays, 69 yards, 2:36; Bethune–Cookman 31–13
- (00:58) MSU TD – Manasseh Bailey 0-yard punt block return, Nicholas O'Shea kick
  Drive: 0 plays, 0 yards, 0:00; Bethune–Cookman 31–20

Passing

- MSU – DeAndre Harris: 10/18, 104 yards
- BCU – Akevious Williams: 7/16, 156 yards, 3 TD, 1 INT

Rushing

- MSU – Josh Chase: 25 carries, 124 yards
- BCU – Akevious Williams: 13 carries, 114 yards, 1 TD

Receiving

- MSU – Xavier Gravette: 5 receptions, 85 yards
- BCU – Jimmie Robinson: 5 receptions, 136 yards, 3 TD

=== Delaware State ===
Delaware State Hornets at Morgan State Bears

Quarter	1	2	3	4	Total
Hornets	0	0	3	0	3
Bears	7	14	3	10	34

at Hughes Stadium, Baltimore, MD

- Date: October 12, 2019
- Game time: 1:00 PM EDT
- Game weather: Temperature: 71 °F (22 °C) • Weather: Overcast
- Game attendance: 8,762
- Referee: Eric Greene
- TV announcers (ESPN3): Phil Shoener (play-by-play) & Emory Hunt (analyst)
- ESPN – Morgan State picks up first win for coach Wheatley /// Box Score, Delaware State at Morgan State /// Pregame Notes /// Postgame Notes

Game information

First Quarter

- (12:23) MSU TD – Josh Chase 33-yard rush, Nicholas O'Shea kick
  Drive: 5 plays, 58 yards, 2:37; Morgan State 7–0

Second Quarter

- (10:29) MSU TD – Josh Chase 9-yard rush, Nicholas O'Shea kick
  Drive: 8 plays, 50 yards, 3:34; Morgan State 14–0
- (00:55) MSU TD – Manasseh Bailey 26-yard pass from DeAndre Harris, Nicholas O'Shea kick
  Drive: 7 plays, 95 yards, 2:12; Morgan State 21–0

Third Quarter

- (10:45) DSU FG – Jose Romo-Martinez 37-yard field goal
  Drive: 11 plays, 45 yards, 4:09; Morgan State 21–3
- (03:28) MSU FG – Nicholas O'Shea 24-yard field goal
  Drive: 9 plays, 44 yards, 3:15; Morgan State 24–3

Fourth Quarter

- (08:38) MSU TD – Jordan Cofield 27-yard pass from DeAndre Harris, Nicholas O'Shea kick
  Drive: 1 play, 27 yards, 0:09; Morgan State 31–3
- (01:41) MSU FG – Nicholas O'Shea 38-yard field goal
  Drive: 9 plays, 56 yards, 5:17; Morgan State 34–3

Passing

- DSU – Tylik Bethea: 13/32, 151 yards, 1 INT
- MSU – DeAndre Harris: 11/19, 161 yards, 2 TD

Rushing

- DSU – Richard Harris: 21 carries, 151 yards
- MSU – Josh Chase: 19 carries, 116 yards, 2 TD

Receiving

- DSU – Trey Gross: 5 receptions, 60 yards
- MSU – Manasseh Bailey: 6 receptions, 106 yards, 1 TD

=== At South Carolina State ===
Morgan State Bears at South Carolina State Bulldogs

Quarter	1	2	3	4	Total
Bears	3	0	0	7	10
Bulldogs	0	10	7	7	24

at Oliver C. Dawson Stadium, Orangeburg, SC

- Date: October 19, 2019
- Game time: 1:30 PM EDT
- Game weather: Temperature: 58 °F (14 °C) • Weather: Rain Showers
- Game attendance: 12,121
- Referee: Antroy Singleton
- TV announcers (ESPN3): Tyler Cupp (play-by-play) & Demetrius Davis (analyst)
- ESPN – Fields passes South Carolina State past Morgan State 24–10 /// Box Score, Morgan State at South Carolina State /// Pregame Notes /// Postgame Notes

Game information

First Quarter

- (11:07) MSU FG – Nicholas O'Shea 39-yard field goal
  Drive: 12 plays, 38 yards, 3:53; Morgan State 3–0

Second Quarter

- (11:49) SCSU TD – Labron Morris 3-yard rush, Dillon Bredesen kick
  Drive: 4 plays, 20 yards, 1:24; South Carolina State 7–3
- (03:23) SCSU FG – Dillon Bredesen 31-yard field goal
  Drive: 9 plays, 37 yards, 3:16; South Carolina State 10–3

Third Quarter

- (13:34) SCSU TD – Will Vereen 49-yard pass from Corey Fields, Dillon Bredesen kick
  Drive: 4 plays, 61 yards, 1:20; South Carolina State 17–3

Fourth Quarter

- (11:27) SCSU TD – Shaquan Davis 41-yard pass from Corey Fields, Dillon Bredesen kick
  Drive: 5 plays, 69 yards, 2:41; South Carolina State 24–3
- (08:35) MSU TD – Josh Chase 14-yard pass from DJ Golatt Jr., Nicholas O'Shea kick
  Drive: 8 plays, 67 yards, 2:46; South Carolina State 24–10

Passing

- MSU – DeAndre Harris: 13/26, 140 yards, 1 INT
- SCSU – Corey Fields: 12/23, 135 yards, 2 TD

Rushing

- MSU – Josh Chase: 15 carries, 12 yards
- SCSU – Labron Morris: 25 carries, 125 yards, 1 TD

Receiving

- MSU – Deontaye White: 5 receptions, 96 yards
- SCSU – Will Vereen: 3 receptions, 63 yards, 1 TD

=== Florida A&M ===
No. 20 Florida A&M Rattlers at Morgan State Bears

Quarter	1	2	3	4	Total
No. 20 Rattlers	7	17	0	0	24
Bears	7	3	0	2	12

at Hughes Stadium, Baltimore, MD

- Date: October 26, 2019
- Game time: 3:00 PM EDT
- Game weather: Temperature: 64 °F (18 °C) • Wind: 5 mph • Weather: Overcast
- Game attendance: 2,786
- Referee: Robert Frazer
- TV announcers (ESPN3): Phil Shoener (play-by-play) & Emory Hunt (analyst)
- ESPN – Florida A&M defeats Morgan State 24–12 /// Box Score, Florida A&M at Morgan State /// Pregame Notes /// Postgame Notes

Game information

First Quarter

- (09:21) MSU TD – E'Munn Parker 27-yard pass from DeAndre Harris, Nicholas O'Shea kick
  Drive: 3 plays, 34 yards, 1:06; Morgan State 7–0
- (05:26) FAMU TD – Davonne Kendrick 3-yard rush, Yahia Aly kick
  Drive: 10 plays, 70 yards, 3:48; Tied 7–7

Second Quarter

- (14:56) FAMU FG – Yahia Aly 50-yard field goal
  Drive: 7 plays, 33 yards, 2:00; Florida A&M 10–7
- (12:26) FAMU TD – Terry Jefferson 50-yard fumble return, Yahia Aly kick
  Drive: 0 plays, 0 yards, 0:00; Florida A&M 17–7
- (03:13) MSU FG – Nicholas O'Shea 22-yard field goal
  Drive: 10 plays, 29 yards, 4:21; Florida A&M 17–10
- (00:33) FAMU TD – Terrell Jennings 21-yard pass from Rasean McKay, Yahia Aly kick
  Drive: 8 plays, 72 yards, 2:35; Florida A&M 24–10

Third Quarter
No scoring
Fourth Quarter

- (14:50) MSU SF – Manasseh Bailey 6-yard safety
  Drive: 0 plays, 0 yards, 0:00; Florida A&M 24–12

Passing

- FAMU – Rasean McKay: 25/35, 246 yards, 1 TD, 1 INT
- MSU – DJ Golatt Jr.: 11/25, 138 yards

Rushing

- FAMU – Terrell Jennings: 18 carries, 51 yards
- MSU – Jabriel Johnson: 5 carries, 22 yards

Receiving

- FAMU – Xavier Smith: 5 receptions, 68 yards
- MSU – Manasseh Bailey: 6 receptions, 90 yards

=== At Norfolk State ===
Morgan State Bears at Norfolk State Spartans

Quarter	1	2	3	4	Total
Bears	0	0	0	0	0
Spartans	17	14	7	10	48

at William "Dick" Price Stadium, Norfolk, VA

- Date: November 2, 2019
- Game time: 2:00 PM EDT
- Game weather: Temperature: 58 °F (14 °C) • Wind: NE 6 mph • Weather: Sunny
- Game attendance: 20,178
- Referee: Robert Frazer
- TV announcers (ESPN3): Ross Gordon (play-by-play) & Woube Gebre (analyst)
- ESPN – Carter leads Norfolk State in 48–0 rout of Morgan State /// Box Score, Morgan State at Norfolk State /// Pregame Notes /// Postgame Notes

Game information

First Quarter

- (12:10) NSU TD – Da'Kendall James 80-yard pass from Juwan Carter, Josh Nardone kick
  Drive: 2 plays, 80 yards, 0:40; Norfolk State 7–0
- (08:28) NSU FG – Josh Nardone 30-yard field goal
  Drive: 5 plays, 36 yards, 2:00; Norfolk State 10–0
- (02:49) NSU TD – Kevin Johnson 4-yard rush, Josh Nardone kick
  Drive: 8 plays, 88 yards, 3:39; Norfolk State 17–0

Second Quarter

- (14:18) NSU TD – Justin Smith 25-yard pass from Juwan Carter, Josh Nardone kick
  Drive: 2 plays, 23 yards, 0:34; Norfolk State 24–0
- (04:35) NSU TD – Juwan Carter 14-yard rush, Josh Nardone kick
  Drive: 9 plays, 67 yards, 4:36; Norfolk State 31–0

Third Quarter

- (06:45) NSU TD – Tylan McElhenie 8-yard pass from Juwan Carter, Josh Nardone kick
  Drive: 10 plays, 43 yards, 3:34; Norfolk State 38–0

Fourth Quarter

- (14:56) NSU FG – Josh Nardone 30-yard field goal
  Drive: 9 plays, 43 yards, 4:14; Norfolk State 41–0
- (14:43) NSU TD – Nhyre' Quinerly 48-yard interception return, Josh Nardone kick
  Drive: 0 plays, 0 yards, 0:00; Norfolk State 48–0

Passing

- MSU – DJ Golatt Jr.: 5/16, 58 yards, 3 INT
- NSU – Juwan Carter: 16/28, 314 yards, 3 TD

Rushing

- MSU – Lavelton Williams: 9 carries, 36 yards
- NSU – Rayquan Smith: 30 carries, 142 yards

Receiving

- MSU – Manasseh Bailey: 2 receptions, 25 yards
- NSU – Da'Kendall James: 2 receptions, 120 yards, 1 TD

=== North Carolina A&T ===
No. 14 North Carolina A&T Aggies at Morgan State Bears

Quarter	1	2	3	4	Total
No. 14 Aggies	3	7	3	3	16
Bears	0	16	0	6	22

at Hughes Stadium, Baltimore, MD

- Date: November 9, 2019
- Game time: 1:00 PM EDT
- Game weather: Temperature: 41 °F (5 °C) • Wind: None • Weather: Partly Cloudy
- Game attendance: 2,467
- Referee: Antroy Singleton
- TV announcers (ESPN3): Phil Shoener (play-by-play) & Emory Hunt (analyst)
- ESPN – Morgan State upsets North Carolina A&T with late touchdown /// Box Score, No. 14 North Carolina A&T at Morgan State /// Pregame Notes /// Postgame Notes

Game information

First Quarter

- (03:46) NCAT FG – Noel Ruiz 34-yard field goal
  Drive: 4 plays, 6 yards, 0:55; North Carolina A&T 3–0

Second Quarter

- (13:19) MSU FG – Nicholas O'Shea 22-yard field goal
  Drive: 13 plays, 70 yards, 5:18; Tied 3–3
- (08:04) MSU TD – Joshua Chase 2-yard rush, Nicholas O'Shea kick
  Drive: 4 plays, 20 yards, 0:56; Morgan State 10–3
- (02:31) NCAT TD – Zachary Leslie 10-yard pass from Kylil Carter, Noel Ruiz kick
  Drive: 11 plays, 58 yards, 5:25; Tied 10–10
- (00:44) MSU TD – Manasseh Bailey 27-yard pass from DeAndre Harris, Nicholas O'Shea kick blocked
  Drive: 6 plays, 67 yards, 1:40; Morgan State 16–10

Third Quarter

- (11:18) NCAT FG – Noel Ruiz 28-yard field goal
  Drive: 8 plays, 53 yards, 3:35; Morgan State 16–13

Fourth Quarter

- (03:27) MSU TD – DeAndre Harris 1-yard rush, Nicholas O'Shea kick blocked
  Drive: 13 plays, 91 yards, 6:38; Morgan State 22–13
- (01:20) NCAT FG – Noel Ruiz 46-yard field goal
  Drive: 11 plays, 31 yards, 1:53; Morgan State 22–16

Passing

- NCAT – Kylil Carter: 15/38, 154 yards, 1 TD, 2 INT
- MSU – DeAndre Harris: 14/20, 218 yards, 1 TD, 1 INT

Rushing

- NCAT – Jah-Maine Martin: 16 carries, 80 yards
- MSU – DeAndre Harris: 13 carries, 49 yards, 1 TD

Receiving

- NCAT – Quinzel Lockhart: 4 receptions, 69 yards
- MSU – Manasseh Bailey: 7 receptions, 118 yards, 1 TD

=== Virginia University of Lynchburg ===
Virginia University of Lynchburg Dragons at Morgan State Bears

Quarter	1	2	3	4	Total
Dragons	12	0	0	14	26
Bears	14	22	10	13	59

at Hughes Stadium, Baltimore, MD

- Date: November 16, 2019
- Game time: 1:00 PM EDT
- Game weather: Temperature: 47 °F (8 °C) • Wind: 9 mph • Weather: Sunny
- Game attendance: 2,450
- Referee: Eric Greene
- TV announcers (ESPN3): Phil Shoener (play-by-play) & Emory Hunt (analyst)
- ESPN – Virginia–Lynchburg at Morgan State /// Box Score, Virginia–Lynchburg at Morgan State /// Pregame Notes /// Postgame Notes

Game information

First Quarter

- (13:10) MSU TD – Joshua Chase 1-yard rush, Nicholas O'Shea kick
  Drive: 4 plays, 60 yards, 1:50; Morgan State 7–0
- (12:20) VUL TD – Said Sidebe 80-yard pass from Sherman Brown, Jerry Sandefor kick blocked
  Drive: 2 plays, 79 yards, 0:42; Morgan State 7–6
- (01:28) MSU TD – Wesley Wolfolk 17-yard pass from DeAndre Harris, Nicholas O'Shea kick
  Drive: 7 plays, 44 yards, 2:44; Morgan State 14–6
- (00:03) VUL TD – Johnny Rembert 64-yard pass from Sherman Brown, Sherman Brown pass failed
  Drive: 3 plays, 73 yards, 1:16; Morgan State 14–12

Second Quarter

- (14:21) MSU TD – Wesley Wolfolk 48-yard pass from DeAndre Harris, Nicholas O'Shea kick failed
  Drive: 2 plays, 50 yards, 0:39; Morgan State 20–12
- (11:15) MSU TD – Manasseh Bailey 87-yard pass from DeAndre Harris, Nicholas O'Shea kick failed
  Drive: 2 plays, 93 yards, 0:41; Morgan State 26–12
- (05:44) MSU TD – Manasseh Bailey 44-yard pass from Wesley Wolfolk, Nicholas O'Shea kick
  Drive: 3 plays, 76 yards, 1:03; Morgan State 33–12
- (00:11) MSU FG – Nicholas O'Shea 34-yard field goal
  Drive: 8 plays, 47 yards, 2:23; Morgan State 36–12

Third Quarter

- (12:25) MSU TD – Manasseh Bailey 40-yard pass from DeAndre Harris, Nicholas O'Shea kick
  Drive: 3 plays, 45 yards, 0:56; Morgan State 43–12
- (03:15) MSU FG – Nicholas O'Shea 25-yard field goal
  Drive: 15 plays, 90 yards, 6:49; Morgan State 46–12

Fourth Quarter

- (13:46) MSU TD – Jabriel Johnson 19-yard rush, Nicholas O'Shea kick
  Drive: 7 plays, 53 yards, 3:10; Morgan State 53–12
- (11:24) MSU TD – Manasseh Bailey 11-yard pass from DeAndre Harris, Nicholas O'Shea pass failed
  Drive: 2 plays, 27 yards, 0:55; Morgan State 59–12
- (10:56) VUL TD – Johnny Rembert 72-yard pass from Marcus Davis, Johnny Rembert pass
  Drive: 1 play, 72 yards, 0:17; Morgan State 59–20
- (07:55) VUL TD – Said Sidebe 84-yard pass from Marcus Davis, Marcus Davis pass failed
  Drive: 2 plays, 91 yards, 0:42; Morgan State 59–26

Passing

- VUL – Sherman Brown: 10/20, 239 yards, 2 TD, 1 INT
- MSU – DeAndre Harris: 11/17, 317 yards, 5 TD

Rushing

- VUL – Tomas Newman: 15 carries, 71 yards
- MSU – Jabriel Johnson: 17 carries, 124 yards, 1 TD

Receiving

- VUL – Johnny Rembert: 5 receptions, 186 yards, 2 TD
- MSU – Manasseh Bailey: 5 receptions, 177 yards, 4 TD

=== At Howard ===
Morgan State Bears at Howard Bison

Quarter	1	2	3	4	Total
Bears	8	0	0	7	15
Bison	0	7	7	6	20

at William H. Greene Stadium, Washington, D.C.

- Date: November 23, 2019
- Game time: 1:00 PM EST
- Game weather: Temperature: 45 °F (7 °C) • Weather: Rain
- Game attendance: 989
- Referee: Eric Greene
- TV announcers (ESPN3): Charlie Neal (play-by-play) & Kevin Frazier (analyst)
- ESPN – Williams leads Howard to 2nd win, beating Morgan St. 20–15 /// Box Score, Morgan State at Howard /// Pregame Notes /// Postgame Notes

Game information

First Quarter

- (00:38) MSU TD – Wesley Wolfolk 34-yard pass from DeAndre Harris, Rico Kennedy pass
  Drive: 10 plays, 80 yards, 4:19; Morgan State 8–0

Second Quarter

- (02:05) HOW TD – Dedrick Parson 9-yard rush, Jordan Aley kick
  Drive: 3 plays, 57 yards, 1:41; Morgan State 8–7

Third Quarter

- (07:24) HOW TD – Kyle Anthony 6-yard pass from Quinton Williams, Jordan Aley kick
  Drive: 9 plays, 98 yards, 5:29; Howard 14–8

Fourth Quarter

- (03:16) MSU TD – E'Munn Parker 7-yard rush, Nicholas O'Shea kick
  Drive: 8 plays, 80 yards, 3:43; Morgan State 15–14
- (00:32) HOW TD – Michael Cornwell 8-yard pass from Quinton Williams, Quinton Williams pass failed
  Drive: 8 plays, 73 yards, 2:37; Howard 20–15

Passing

- MSU – DeAndre Harris: 14/22, 245 yards, 1 TD
- HOW – Quinton Williams: 13/25, 202 yards, 2 TD, 1 INT

Rushing

- MSU – Joshua Chase: 14 carries, 38 yards
- HOW – Dedrick Parson: 26 carries, 170 yards, 1 TD

Receiving

- MSU – Wesley Wolfolk: 4 receptions, 116 yards, 1 TD
- HOW – Jordan Aley: 4 receptions, 70 yards

== Coaching staff ==
2019 Morgan State Bears coaching staff
Head coach: Head coach – Tyrone Wheatley; Offensive coaches: Offensive coordinator/quarterbacks – Travis Manger; Tight ends/recruiting coordinator – Josh Firm; Wide receivers/pass game coordinator – Derrick Alexander; Running backs/Asst. Special Teams coordinator – Jerome Smith; Offensive line/run game coordinator – Isaac Williams; Defensive coaches: Defensive coordinator/co-special teams coordinator/outside linebackers – Antonio James; Inside linebackers – Open; Defensive backs – Derrell Poland; Safeties – Jordan Pulou; Defensive line – William Carr; Special teams coaches: Special teams coordinator – Anthony Binker; Administrative staff: Head Strength and Conditioning Coach – Thomas DiStasio; Assistant strength and conditioning Coach – Tommy King; Asst. Athletic Director for Football Administration – Andrew Magee; Video coordinator – Ethan Stokes; Source: Last updated July 24, 2019.
