= Trei Oliver =

American football player and coach (born 1976)

Current position
- Title: Head coach
- Team: North Carolina Central
- Conference: MEAC
- Record: 45–26

Biographical details
- Born: June 9, 1976 (age 50); Yorktown, Virginia, U.S.
- Education: North Carolina Central University (1998); Grambling State University (2010)

Playing career
- 1994–1997: North Carolina Central
- Positions: Defensive back, punter

Coaching career (HC unless noted)
- 1999–2002: Delaware State (DB/assistant ST)
- 2003–2006: North Carolina Central (ST/WR/DB/RC)
- 2007–2010: Grambling State (ST/OLB/RC)
- 2011–2015: North Carolina A&T (OLB/RC)
- 2016–2018: Southern (DC/S)
- 2019–present: North Carolina Central

Head coaching record
- Overall: 45–26
- Bowls: 1–0
- Tournaments: 0–1

Accomplishments and honors

Championships
- 1 black college national (2022); 2 MEAC (2022, 2023)

Awards
- MEAC Coach of the Year (2022)

Trei Oliver (born June 9, 1976) is an American college football coach. He is the head football coach at North Carolina Central University, a position he has held since December 2018. Oliver played college football at North Carolina Central as a defensive back and punter from 1994 to 1997.

== Head coaching record ==
Year	Team	Overall	Conference	Standing	Bowl/playoffs	STATS^{#}	Coaches^{°}
North Carolina Central Eagles (Mid-Eastern Athletic Conference) (2019–present)
2019	North Carolina Central	4–8	3–5	6th			
2020–21	No team—COVID-19						
2021	North Carolina Central	6–5	4–1	2nd			
2022	North Carolina Central	10–2	4–1	T–1st	W Celebration	21	17
2023	North Carolina Central	9–3	4–1	T–1st	L NCAA Division I First Round		
2024	North Carolina Central	8–3	4–1	2nd			
2025	North Carolina Central	8–4	4–2	3rd			
2026	North Carolina Central	0–1	0–0				
North Carolina Central:		45–26	21–11				
Total:		45–26					
National championship Conference title Conference division title or championship game berth
