= 2019 Norfolk State Spartans football team =

American college football season

2019 Norfolk State Spartans football
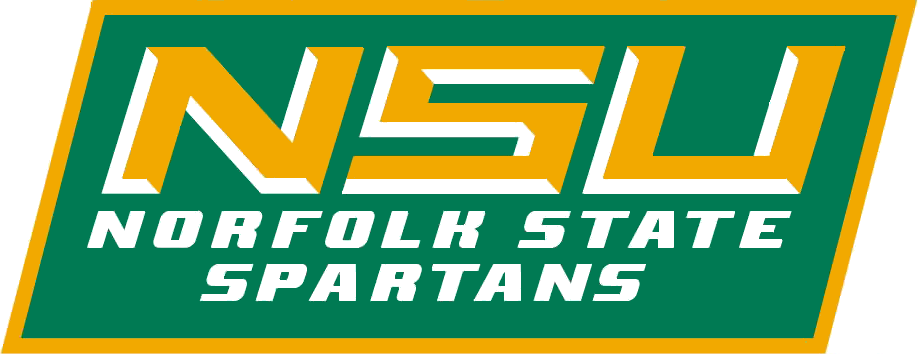
- Conference: Mid-Eastern Athletic Conference
- Record: 5–7 (4–4 MEAC)
- Head coach: Latrell Scott (5th season)
- Home stadium: William "Dick" Price Stadium

2019 Mid-Eastern Athletic Conference football standings
	Conf.			Overall
Team	W		L	W		L
No. 24 Florida A&M *	7	–	1	9	–	2
No. 20 North Carolina A&T +	6	–	2	9	–	3
South Carolina State +	6	–	2	8	–	3
Bethune–Cookman	5	–	3	7	–	4
Norfolk State	4	–	4	5	–	7
North Carolina Central	3	–	5	4	–	8
Howard	2	–	6	2	–	10
Morgan State	2	–	6	3	–	9
Delaware State	1	–	7	2	–	10
+ – Conference co-champions; * Florida A&M ineligible for conference title due to NCAA sanctions; Rankings from STATS Poll

The 2019 Norfolk State Spartans football team represented Norfolk State University in the 2019 NCAA Division I FCS football season. They were led by fourth-year head coach Latrell Scott and played their home games at William "Dick" Price Stadium. They were a member of the Mid-Eastern Athletic Conference (MEAC). They finished the season 5–7, 4–4 in MEAC play to finish in fifth place.

== Preseason ==
=== MEAC poll ===
In the MEAC preseason poll released on July 26, 2019, the Spartans were predicted to finish in seventh place.

=== Preseason All–MEAC teams ===
The Spartans had six players selected to the preseason all-MEAC teams.

Second Team Offense

Kenneth Kirby – OL

Third Team Offense

Aaron Savage – RB

Anthony Williams – TE

Second Team Defense

Nigel Chavis – LB

Bobby Price – DB

Nhyre' Quinerly – DB

== Schedule ==
Date	Time	Opponent	Site	TV	Result	Attendance
August 31	7:00 p.m.	at Old Dominion*	S.B. Ballard Stadium; Norfolk, VA	ESPN3	L 21–24	21,944
September 7	6:00 p.m.	Virginia State*	William "Dick" Price Stadium; Norfolk, VA	ESPN3	W 44–21	15,538
September 14	2:00 p.m.	at Coastal Carolina*	Brooks Stadium; Conway, SC	ESPN3	L 7–46	13,659
September 21	3:00 p.m.	at No. 8 Montana State*	Bobcat Stadium; Bozeman, MT	Pluto TV	L 21–56	17,647
September 28	4:00 p.m.	Florida A&M	William "Dick" Price Stadium; Norfolk, VA	ESPN3	L 28–30	8,249
October 5	2:00 p.m.	No. 15 North Carolina A&T	William "Dick Price Stadium; Norfolk, VA	ESPN3	L 19–58	11,062
October 12	1:00 p.m.	at Howard	William H. Greene Stadium; Washington, D.C.	ESPN3	W 49–21	7,532
October 19	4:00 p.m.	at Bethune–Cookman	Daytona Stadium; Daytona Beach, FL	ESPN3	L 22–35	2,135
November 2	2:00 p.m.	Morgan State^{†}	William "Dick" Price Stadium; Norfolk, VA	ESPN3	W 48–0	15,628
November 9	2:00 p.m.	at North Carolina Central	O'Kelly–Riddick Stadium; Durham, NC	ESPN3	W 38–21	12,319
November 16	2:00 p.m.	at Delaware State	Alumni Stadium; Dover, DE	ESPN3	W 33–17	827
November 23	1:00 p.m.	South Carolina State	William "Dick" Price Stadium; Norfolk, VA	ESPN3	L 17–20 ^{OT}	2,844
*Non-conference game; ^{†}Homecoming; Rankings from STATS Poll released prior to the game; All times are in Eastern time

== Game summaries ==
=== At Old Dominion ===
	1	2	3	4	Total
Spartans	0	6	0	15	21
Monarchs	14	0	3	7	24

=== Virginia State ===
	1	2	3	4	Total
Trojans	0	7	0	14	21
Spartans	7	16	14	7	44

=== At Coastal Carolina ===
	1	2	3	4	Total
Spartans	0	7	0	0	7
Chanticleers	12	7	14	13	46

=== At Montana State ===
	1	2	3	4	Total
Spartans	7	7	7	0	21
No. 8 Bobcats	14	14	14	14	56

=== Florida A&M ===
	1	2	3	4	Total
Rattlers	7	10	6	7	30
Spartans	7	7	7	7	28

=== North Carolina A&T ===
	1	2	3	4	Total
No. 15 Aggies	13	24	21	0	58
Spartans	3	6	10	0	19

=== At Howard ===
	1	2	3	4	Total
Spartans	14	14	14	7	49
Bison	7	14	0	0	21

=== At Bethune–Cookman ===
	1	2	3	4	Total
Spartans	7	7	0	8	22
Wildcats	0	19	6	10	35

=== Morgan State ===
	1	2	3	4	Total
Bears	0	0	0	0	0
Spartans	17	14	17	0	48

=== At North Carolina Central ===
	1	2	3	4	Total
Spartans	10	7	14	7	38
Eagles	7	0	7	7	21

=== At Delaware State ===
	1	2	3	4	Total
Spartans	0	16	7	10	33
Hornets	10	0	7	0	17

=== South Carolina State ===
	1	2	3	4	OT	Total
Bulldogs	7	0	7	3	3	20
Spartans	0	3	7	7	0	17
