= 2019 South Carolina State Bulldogs football team =

American college football season

2019 South Carolina State Bulldogs football
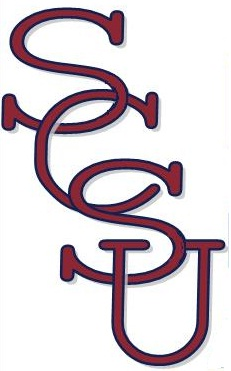

MEAC co-champion
- Conference: Mid-Eastern Athletic Conference
- Record: 8–3 (6–2 MEAC)
- Head coach: Oliver Pough (18th season)
- Home stadium: Oliver C. Dawson Stadium

2019 Mid-Eastern Athletic Conference football standings
	Conf.			Overall
Team	W		L	W		L
No. 24 Florida A&M *	7	–	1	9	–	2
No. 20 North Carolina A&T +	6	–	2	9	–	3
South Carolina State +	6	–	2	8	–	3
Bethune–Cookman	5	–	3	7	–	4
Norfolk State	4	–	4	5	–	7
North Carolina Central	3	–	5	4	–	8
Howard	2	–	6	2	–	10
Morgan State	2	–	6	3	–	9
Delaware State	1	–	7	2	–	10
+ – Conference co-champions; * Florida A&M ineligible for conference title due to NCAA sanctions; Rankings from STATS Poll

The 2019 South Carolina State Bulldogs football team represented South Carolina State University in the 2019 NCAA Division I FCS football season. They were led by 18th-year head coach Oliver Pough who became the program's all-time winningest coach during the season, surpassing former head coach Willie Jeffries. The Bulldogs played their home games at Oliver C. Dawson Stadium. They are a member of the Mid-Eastern Athletic Conference (MEAC).

S.C. State was awarded the MEAC Co-Championship together with the North Carolina A&T Aggies.

Both teams finished with 8–3 overall records and 6–2 within the MEAC, however due to Florida A&M being ineligible for postseason play, and by virtue of North Carolina A&T's victory over South Carolina State, the Aggies received the MEAC's bid to the Celebration Bowl. As a “bubble team” in consideration for the 2019 FCS Playoffs S.C. State was not chosen, thus ending their season.

== Preseason ==
=== MEAC poll ===
In the MEAC preseason poll released on July 26, 2019, the Bulldogs were predicted to finish in sixth place.

=== Preseason All–MEAC teams ===
The Bulldogs had two players selected to the preseason all-MEAC teams.

First Team Offense

Alex Taylor – OL

Second Team Offense

Mike Terry – C

Third Team Offense

Tyrece Nick – QB

Second Team Defense

Tyrell Goodwin – DL

Paul Mckeiver – DL

Third Team Defense

Bruce Johnson – DL

Cobie Durant – DB

== Schedule ==
Date	Time	Opponent	Site	TV	Result	Attendance
August 31	6:00 p.m.	No. 9 Wofford*	Oliver C. Dawson Stadium; Orangeburg, SC	ESPN3	W 28–13	8,187
September 7	4:00 p.m.	Lane*	Oliver C. Dawson Stadium; Orangeburg, SC	MEAC All Access	W 34–0	6,237
September 14	6:00 p.m.	at South Florida*	Raymond James Stadium; Tampa, FL	ESPN3	L 16–55	31,368
October 5	7:00 p.m.	at Delaware State	Alumni Stadium; Dover, DE	ESPN3	W 38–24	985
October 12	2:00 p.m.	Florida A&M	Oliver C. Dawson Stadium; Orangeburg, SC	ESPN3	L 38–42	15,792
October 19	1:30 p.m.	Morgan State^{†}	Oliver C. Dawson Stadium; Orangeburg, SC	ESPN3	W 24–10	12,121
October 26	4:00 p.m.	at Bethune–Cookman	Daytona Stadium; Daytona Beach, FL	ESPN3	W 27–19	12,204
November 2	1:30 p.m.	No. 16 North Carolina A&T	Oliver C. Dawson Stadium; Orangeburg, SC (rivalry)	ESPN3	L 20–22	11,183
November 9	1:30 p.m.	Howard	Oliver C. Dawson stadium; Orangeburg, SC	ESPN3	W 62–21	8,515
November 16	2:00 p.m.	at North Carolina Central	O'Kelly–Riddick Stadium; Durham, NC	ESPN3	W 24–0	3,043
November 23	1:00 p.m.	at Norfolk State	William "Dick" Price Stadium; Norfolk, VA	ESPN3	W 20–17 ^{OT}	1,453
*Non-conference game; ^{†}Homecoming; Rankings from STATS Poll released prior to the game; All times are in Eastern time

== Game summaries ==
=== No. 9 Wofford ===
	1	2	3	4	Total
No. 9 Terriers	3	0	3	7	13
Bulldogs	7	7	7	7	28

=== Lane ===
	1	2	3	4	Total
Dragons	0	0	0	0	0
Bulldogs	14	10	3	7	34

=== At South Florida ===
	1	2	3	4	Total
Bulldogs	3	0	6	7	16
Bulls	7	17	17	14	55

=== At Delaware State ===
	1	2	3	4	Total
Bulldogs	10	7	14	7	38
Hornets	0	3	7	14	24

=== Florida A&M ===
	1	2	3	4	Total
Rattlers	7	7	14	14	42
Bulldogs	0	14	3	21	38

=== Morgan State ===
	1	2	3	4	Total
Bears	3	0	0	7	10
Bulldogs	0	10	7	7	24

=== At Bethune–Cookman ===
	1	2	3	4	Total
Bulldogs	7	20	0	0	27
Wildcats	0	13	6	0	19

=== North Carolina A&T ===
	1	2	3	4	Total
No. 17 Aggies	0	16	6	0	22
Bulldogs	3	7	0	10	20

=== Howard ===
	1	2	3	4	Total
Bison	0	7	7	7	21
Bulldogs	20	14	21	7	62

=== At North Carolina Central ===
	1	2	3	4	Total
Bulldogs	7	7	10	0	24
Eagles	0	0	0	0	0

=== At Norfolk State ===
	1	2	3	4	OT	Total
Bulldogs	7	0	7	3	3	20
Spartans	0	3	7	7	0	17
