= 2019 Florida A&M Rattlers football team =

American college football season

2019 Florida A&M Rattlers football
- Conference: Mid-Eastern Athletic Conference

Ranking
- STATS: No. 24
- FCS Coaches: No. 25
- Record: 9–2 (7–1 MEAC)
- Head coach: Willie Simmons (2nd season)
- Offensive coordinator: Alex Jackson (2nd season)
- Offensive scheme: Spread
- Defensive coordinator: Ralph Street (2nd season)
- Base defense: 4–3
- Home stadium: Bragg Memorial Stadium

2019 Mid-Eastern Athletic Conference football standings
| | Conf. | | | Overall |
| Team | W | | L | W | | L |
|---|---|---|---|---|---|---|
| No. 24 Florida A&M * | 7 | – | 1 | 9 | – | 2 |
| No. 20 North Carolina A&T + | 6 | – | 2 | 9 | – | 3 |
| South Carolina State + | 6 | – | 2 | 8 | – | 3 |
| Bethune–Cookman | 5 | – | 3 | 7 | – | 4 |
| Norfolk State | 4 | – | 4 | 5 | – | 7 |
| North Carolina Central | 3 | – | 5 | 4 | – | 8 |
| Howard | 2 | – | 6 | 2 | – | 10 |
| Morgan State | 2 | – | 6 | 3 | – | 9 |
| Delaware State | 1 | – | 7 | 2 | – | 10 |
+ – Conference co-champions; * Florida A&M ineligible for conference title due to NCAA sanctions; Rankings from STATS Poll

The 2019 Florida A&M Rattlers football team represented Florida A&M University as member of the Mid-Eastern Athletic Conference (MEAC) during the 2019 NCAA Division I FCS football season. The Rattlers were led by second-year head coach Willie Simmons and played their home games at Bragg Memorial Stadium. Florida A&M finished the year 9–2 overall and 7–1 in MEAC play to post with the best record in the MEAC and across all HBCU schools. However, in May 2019, Florida A&M had been banned from 2019 postseason play; as a result, the team could not compete in the Celebration Bowl or for a MEAC championship.

== Preseason ==
=== MEAC poll ===
In the MEAC preseason poll released on July 26, 2019, the Rattlers were predicted to finish in third place.

=== Preseason All–MEAC teams ===
The Rattlers had eleven players selected to the preseason all-MEAC teams.

Second Team Offense

Ryan Stanley – QB

Deshawn Smith – RB

Xavier Smith – WR

Third Team Offense

Bishop Bonnette – RB

Chad Hunter – WR

First Team Defense

Yahia Aly – K

Chris Faddoul – P

Second Team Defense

Terry Jefferson – DB

Third Team Defense

Demontre Moore – DL

Elijah Richardson – LB

Herman Jackson Jr. – DB

== Schedule ==
| Date | Time | Opponent | Rank | Site | TV | Result | Attendance |
|---|---|---|---|---|---|---|---|
| August 29 | 7:30 p.m. | at No. 17 (FBS) UCF* | | Spectrum Stadium; Orlando, FL | CBSSN | L 0–62 | 44,073 |
| September 14 | 6:00 p.m. | Fort Valley State* | | Bragg Memorial Stadium; Tallahassee, FL | ESPN3 | W 57–20 | 17,911 |
| September 21 | 6:00 p.m. | Southern* | | Bragg Memorial Stadium; Tallahassee, FL | ESPN3 | W 27–21 | 27,191 |
| September 28 | 4:00 p.m. | at Norfolk State | | William "Dick" Price Stadium; Norfolk, VA | ESPN3 | W 30–28 | 8,249 |
| October 5 | 2:00 p.m. | North Carolina Central^{†} | | Bragg Memorial Stadium; Tallahassee, FL | ESPN3 | W 28–21 | 25,679 |
| October 12 | 2:00 p.m. | at South Carolina State | | Oliver C. Dawson Stadium; Orangeburg, SC | ESPN3 | W 42–38 | 15,792 |
| October 20 | 2:00 p.m. | No. 10 North Carolina A&T | | Bragg Memorial Stadium; Tallahassee, FL | ESPN3 | W 34–31 | 1,051 |
| October 26 | 3:00 p.m. | at Morgan State | No. 20 | Hughes Stadium; Baltimore, MD | ESPN3 | W 24–12 | 2,786 |
| November 2 | 4:00 p.m. | Delaware State | No. 17 | Bragg Memorial Stadium; Tallahassee, FL | ESPN3 | W 52–30 | 7,412 |
| November 16 | 4:00 p.m. | Howard | No. 12 | Bragg Memorial Stadium; Tallahassee, FL | ESPN3 | W 39–7 | 8,979 |
| November 23 | 3:30 p.m. | vs. Bethune–Cookman | No. 12 | Camping World Stadium; Orlando, FL (Florida Classic) | ESPNews | L 27–31 | 55,730 |
*Non-conference game; ^{†}Homecoming; Rankings from STATS Poll released prior to the game; All times are in Eastern time

== Game summaries ==
=== At UCF ===
| | 1 | 2 | 3 | 4 | Total |
|---|---|---|---|---|---|
| Rattlers | 0 | 0 | 0 | 0 | 0 |
| No. 17 (FBS) Knights | 17 | 31 | 7 | 7 | 62 |

=== Fort Valley State ===
| | 1 | 2 | 3 | 4 | Total |
|---|---|---|---|---|---|
| Wildcats | 0 | 0 | 6 | 14 | 20 |
| Rattlers | 14 | 26 | 7 | 10 | 57 |

=== Southern ===
| | 1 | 2 | 3 | 4 | Total |
|---|---|---|---|---|---|
| Jaguars | 0 | 7 | 7 | 7 | 21 |
| Rattlers | 17 | 0 | 2 | 8 | 27 |

=== At Norfolk State ===
| | 1 | 2 | 3 | 4 | Total |
|---|---|---|---|---|---|
| Rattlers | 7 | 10 | 6 | 7 | 30 |
| Spartans | 7 | 7 | 7 | 7 | 28 |

=== North Carolina Central ===
| | 1 | 2 | 3 | 4 | Total |
|---|---|---|---|---|---|
| Eagles | 0 | 7 | 7 | 7 | 21 |
| Rattlers | 7 | 7 | 0 | 14 | 28 |

=== At South Carolina State ===
| | 1 | 2 | 3 | 4 | Total |
|---|---|---|---|---|---|
| Rattlers | 7 | 7 | 14 | 14 | 42 |
| Bulldogs | 0 | 14 | 3 | 21 | 38 |

=== North Carolina A&T ===
| | 1 | 2 | 3 | 4 | OT | Total |
|---|---|---|---|---|---|---|
| No. 10 Aggies | 7 | 7 | 3 | 11 | 3 | 31 |
| Rattlers | 14 | 7 | 0 | 7 | 6 | 34 |

=== At Morgan State ===
| | 1 | 2 | 3 | 4 | Total |
|---|---|---|---|---|---|
| No. 20 Rattlers | 7 | 17 | 0 | 0 | 24 |
| Bears | 7 | 3 | 0 | 2 | 12 |

=== Delaware State ===
| | 1 | 2 | 3 | 4 | Total |
|---|---|---|---|---|---|
| Hornets | 0 | 3 | 20 | 7 | 30 |
| No. 17 Rattlers | 14 | 17 | 14 | 7 | 52 |

=== Howard ===
| | 1 | 2 | 3 | 4 | Total |
|---|---|---|---|---|---|
| Bison | 0 | 0 | 0 | 7 | 7 |
| No. 12 Rattlers | 3 | 14 | 22 | 0 | 39 |

=== Vs. Bethune–Cookman ===
| | 1 | 2 | 3 | 4 | Total |
|---|---|---|---|---|---|
| No. 12 Rattlers | 7 | 6 | 7 | 7 | 27 |
| Wildcats | 7 | 14 | 0 | 10 | 31 |

== Ranking movements ==
Ranking movements Legend: ██ Increase in ranking ██ Decrease in ranking — = Not ranked RV = Received votes т = Tied with team above or below
| | Week | | | | | | | | | | | | | | |
| Poll | Pre | 1 | 2 | 3 | 4 | 5 | 6 | 7 | 8 | 9 | 10 | 11 | 12 | 13 | Final |
|---|---|---|---|---|---|---|---|---|---|---|---|---|---|---|---|
| STATS FCS | — | — | — | — | — | — | — | RV | 20 | 17 | 16 | 12 | 12 | 20 | 24 |
| Coaches | — | — | — | — | — | — | — | RV | 23 | 17 | 15T | 14 | 13 | 21 | 25 |
