= 2019 Bethune–Cookman Wildcats football team =

American college football season

2019 Bethune–Cookman Wildcats football
- Conference: Mid-Eastern Athletic Conference
- Record: 7–4 (5–3 MEAC)
- Head coach: Terry Sims (5th season)
- Offensive coordinator: Allen Suber (3rd season)
- Defensive coordinator: Charles Jones (10th season)
- Home stadium: Daytona Stadium

2019 Mid-Eastern Athletic Conference football standings
	Conf.			Overall
Team	W		L	W		L
No. 24 Florida A&M *	7	–	1	9	–	2
No. 20 North Carolina A&T +	6	–	2	9	–	3
South Carolina State +	6	–	2	8	–	3
Bethune–Cookman	5	–	3	7	–	4
Norfolk State	4	–	4	5	–	7
North Carolina Central	3	–	5	4	–	8
Howard	2	–	6	2	–	10
Morgan State	2	–	6	3	–	9
Delaware State	1	–	7	2	–	10
+ – Conference co-champions; * Florida A&M ineligible for conference title due to NCAA sanctions; Rankings from STATS Poll

The 2019 Bethune–Cookman Wildcats football team represented Bethune–Cookman University in the 2019 NCAA Division I FCS football season. They were led by fifth-year head coach Terry Sims and played their home games at Daytona Stadium. They were a member of the Mid-Eastern Athletic Conference (MEAC). They finished the season 7–4, 5–3 in MEAC play to finish in fourth place.

== Preseason ==
=== MEAC poll ===
In the MEAC preseason poll released on July 26, 2019, the Wildcats were predicted to finish in second place.

=== Preseason All–MEAC teams ===
The Wildcats had eleven players selected to the preseason all-MEAC teams.

First Team Offense

L'Dre Barnes – C

Second Team Offense

Cedric Jackson – OL

Third Team Offense

Akevious Williams – QB

Nicholas Roos – OL

Jamal Savage – OL

First Team Defense

Marques Ford – DL

Marquis Hendrix – LB

Trevor Merritt – DB

Tydarius Peters – DB

Jimmie Robinson – RS

Third Team Defense

Gerome Howard – DL

== Schedule ==
Date	Time	Opponent	Site	TV	Result	Attendance
September 1	3:00 p.m.	vs. Jackson State*	Georgia State Stadium; Atlanta, GA (MEAC/SWAC Challenge)	ESPN2	W 36–15	23,333
~~September 7~~	~~4:00 p.m.~~	~~No. 23 Southeastern Louisiana*~~ (Note: The game against Southeastern Louisiana was cancelled due to the expected impact of Hurricane Dorian on the Daytona Beach, Florida area.)	~~Daytona Stadium~~; ~~Daytona Beach, FL~~		Cancelled	
September 14	4:00 p.m.	at Miami (FL)*	Hard Rock Stadium; Miami Gardens, FL	ACCN	L 0–63	52,036
September 21	7:00 p.m.	at Mississippi Valley State*	Rice–Totten Stadium; Itta Bena, MS	Youtube	W 22–6	6,487
September 28	1:00 p.m.	at Howard	William H. Greene Stadium; Washington, D.C.	ESPN3	W 37–29	5,700
October 5	4:00 p.m.	Morgan State	Daytona Stadium; Daytona Beach, FL	ESPN3	W 31–20	5,642
October 10	6:00 p.m.	at North Carolina Central	O'Kelly–Riddick Stadium; Durham, NC	ESPNU	W 27–13	5,261
October 19	4:00 p.m.	Norfolk State	Daytona Stadium; Daytona Beach, FL	ESPN3	W 35–22	2,135
October 26	4:00 p.m.	South Carolina State^{†}	Daytona Stadium; Daytona Beach, FL	ESPN3	L 19–27	12,204
November 9	2:00 p.m.	at Delaware State	Alumni Stadium; Dover, DE	ESPN3	L 13–16	879
November 16	1:00 p.m.	at No. 25 North Carolina A&T	BB&T Stadium; Greensboro, NC	ESPN3	L 17–47	10,355
November 23	3:30 p.m.	vs. No. 12 Florida A&M	Camping World Stadium; Orlando, FL (Florida Classic)	ESPNews	W 31–27	55,730
*Non-conference game; ^{†}Homecoming; Rankings from STATS Poll released prior to the game; All times are in Eastern time

== Game summaries ==
=== Vs. Jackson State ===
	1	2	3	4	Total
Wildcats	0	0	22	14	36
Tigers	3	0	12	0	15

Scoring summary

Quarter	Time	Drive			Team	Scoring information	Score	
Quarter	Time	Plays	Yards	TOP	Team	Scoring information	COOK	JSU
1	12:35	6	60	2:25	JSU	25-yard field goal by Adrian Salazar	0	3
3	10:10	6	60	3:12	JSU	Jordan Johnson 8-yard touchdown run, Adrian Salazar kick blocked	0	9
3	7:18				COOK	Interception returned 50 yards for touchdown by Trevor Merritt, Xavier McDonald kick good	7	9
3	5:34	3	60	1:44	JSU	Warren Newman 34-yard touchdown reception from Jalon Jones, Adrian Salazar kick missed	7	12
3	4:09	5	57	1:25	COOK	Akevious Williams 20-yard touchdown run, Xavier McDonald kick good	14	15
3	2:33	3	9	0:59	COOK	Taron Mallard 1-yard touchdown reception from Akevious Williams, 2-point pass good	22	15
4	11:16	5	47	1:34	COOK	LaDerrien Wilson 5-yard touchdown run, Xavier McDonald kick good	29	15
4	9:01				COOK	Fumble recovery returned 96 yards for touchdown by Sam Marc, Xavier McDonald kick good	36	15
"TOP" = time of possession. For other American football terms, see Glossary of American football.							36	15

=== At Miami (FL) ===
	1	2	3	4	Total
Wildcats	0	0	0	0	0
Hurricanes	7	21	14	21	63

=== At Mississippi Valley State ===
	1	2	3	4	Total
Wildcats	2	13	0	7	22
Delta Devils	6	0	0	0	6

=== At Howard ===
	1	2	3	4	Total
Wildcats	21	3	0	13	37
Bison	7	0	7	15	29

=== Morgan State ===
	1	2	3	4	Total
Bears	0	6	0	14	20
Wildcats	3	7	14	7	31

=== At North Carolina Central ===
	1	2	3	4	Total
Wildcats	0	7	7	13	27
Eagles	0	3	0	10	13

=== Norfolk State ===
	1	2	3	4	Total
Spartans	7	7	0	8	22
Wildcats	0	19	6	10	35

=== South Carolina State ===
	1	2	3	4	Total
Bulldogs	7	20	0	0	27
Wildcats	0	13	6	0	19

=== At Delaware State ===
	1	2	3	4	Total
Wildcats	0	6	0	7	13
Hornets	9	7	0	0	16

=== At North Carolina A&T ===
	1	2	3	4	Total
Wildcats	0	10	0	7	17
No. 25 Aggies	14	6	6	21	47

=== Vs. Florida A&M ===
	1	2	3	4	Total
No. 12 Rattlers	7	6	7	7	27
Wildcats	7	14	0	10	31
