= Terry Sims =

American football coach

Current position
- Title: Head coach
- Team: Clark Atlanta
- Conference: SIAC
- Record: 0–0

Biographical details
- Born: c. 1971

Playing career
- c. 1993: Knoxville
- Position: Defensive back

Coaching career (HC unless noted)
- 1994: Knoxville (SA)
- 1995: Louisville (GA)
- 1997–1999: Austin Peay (RB)
- 2000–2003: Texas Southern (DB)
- 2004: Prairie View A&M (DB)
- 2005–2006: Louisiana–Lafayette (STC/RB)
- 2007–2009: Howard (DB/ST/RC)
- 2010–2014: Bethune–Cookman (AHC/S/ST)
- 2015–2022: Bethune–Cookman
- 2026–present: Clark Atlanta

Administrative career (AD unless noted)
- 2023–2025: Alabama State (DFO)

Head coaching record
- Overall: 38–39

Accomplishments and honors

Championships
- 1 MEAC (2015)

Awards
- MEAC Coach of the Year (2015)

Terry Sims (born c. 1971) is an American college football coach. He is the head football coach for Clark Atlanta University, a position he has held since 2026. He previously served as the head football coach at Bethune–Cookman University from 2015 to 2022. Sims was fired following the 2022 season.

== Head coaching record ==
Year	Team	Overall	Conference	Standing	Bowl/playoffs	FCS^{#}
Bethune–Cookman Wildcats (Mid-Eastern Athletic Conference) (2015–2020)
2015	Bethune–Cookman	9–2	7–1	T–1st		25
2016	Bethune–Cookman	4–6	4–4	T–5th		
2017	Bethune–Cookman	7–4	6–2	T–2nd		
2018	Bethune–Cookman	7–5	5–2	T–2nd		
2019	Bethune–Cookman	7–4	5–3	4th		
2020–21	No team—COVID-19					
Bethune–Cookman Wildcats (Southwestern Athletic Conference) (2021–2022)
2021	Bethune–Cookman	2–9	2–6	6th (East)		
2022	Bethune–Cookman	2–9	2–6	T–5th (East)		
Bethune–Cookman:		38–39	31–24			
Clark Atlanta Panthers (Southern Intercollegiate Athletic Conference) (2026–present)
2026	Clark Atlanta	0–0	0–0			
Clark Atlanta:		0–0	0–0			
Total:		38–39				
National championship Conference title Conference division title or championship game berth
