= 2019 Delaware State Hornets football team =

American college football season

2019 Delaware State Hornets football
- Conference: Mid-Eastern Athletic Conference
- Record: 2–10 (1–7 MEAC)
- Head coach: Rod Milstead (2nd season)
- Home stadium: Alumni Stadium

2019 Mid-Eastern Athletic Conference football standings
	Conf.			Overall
Team	W		L	W		L
No. 24 Florida A&M *	7	–	1	9	–	2
No. 20 North Carolina A&T +	6	–	2	9	–	3
South Carolina State +	6	–	2	8	–	3
Bethune–Cookman	5	–	3	7	–	4
Norfolk State	4	–	4	5	–	7
North Carolina Central	3	–	5	4	–	8
Howard	2	–	6	2	–	10
Morgan State	2	–	6	3	–	9
Delaware State	1	–	7	2	–	10
+ – Conference co-champions; * Florida A&M ineligible for conference title due to NCAA sanctions; Rankings from STATS Poll

The 2019 Delaware State Hornets football team represented Delaware State University in the 2019 NCAA Division I FCS football season. They were led by second-year head coach Rod Milstead and played all their home games at Alumni Stadium. They were a member of the Mid-Eastern Athletic Conference (MEAC). They finished the season 2–10, 1–7 in MEAC play to finish in last place.

== Preseason ==
=== MEAC poll ===
In the MEAC preseason poll released on July 26, 2019, the Hornets were predicted to finish in ninth place.

=== Preseason All–MEAC teams ===
The Hornets had eight players selected to the preseason all-MEAC teams.

First Team Offense

Kaiden Crawford – OL

Third Team Offense

Isiah Williams – TE

First Team Defense

Brian Cavicante – LB

Jahad Neibauer – DB

Second Team Defense

Christian Johnson – DL

Jose Romo-Martinez – K

Fidel Romo–Martinez – P

Third Team Defense

Devin Smith – DB

== Schedule ==
Date	Time	Opponent	Site	TV	Result	Attendance
August 29	7:00 p.m.	at No. 22 Delaware*	Delaware Stadium; Newark, DE (Route 1 Rivalry)	FloSports	L 13–31	15,894
September 14	4:00 p.m.	Lincoln (PA)*	Alumni Stadium; Dover, DE	YouTube	W 58–12	2,078
September 21	2:00 p.m.	Howard^{†}	Alumni Stadium; Dover, DE	ESPN3	L 9–24	4,142
September 26	7:30 p.m.	at No. 17 North Carolina A&T	BB&T Stadium; Greensboro, NC	ESPNU	L 0–37	16,567
October 5	7:00 p.m.	South Carolina State	Alumni Stadium; Dover, DE	ESPN+	L 24–38	985
October 12	1:00 p.m.	at Morgan State	Hughes Stadium; Baltimore, MD	ESPN3	L 3–34	8,762
October 19	2:00 p.m.	Merrimack*	Alumni Stadium; Dover, DE	ESPN+	L 21–30	1,158
October 26	2:00 p.m.	at North Carolina Central	O'Kelly–Riddick Stadium; Durham, NC	ESPN3	L 23–30	5,026
November 2	4:00 p.m.	at No. 17 Florida A&M	Bragg Memorial Stadium; Tallahassee, FL	ESPN3	L 30–52	7,412
November 9	2:00 p.m.	Bethune–Cookman	Alumni Stadium; Dover, DE	ESPN+	W 16–13	879
November 16	2:00 p.m.	Norfolk State	Alumni Stadium; Dover, DE	ESPN+	L 17–33	827
November 23	2:00 p.m.	Saint Francis (PA)*	Alumni Stadium; Dover, DE	ESPN+	L 21–35	527
*Non-conference game; ^{†}Homecoming; Rankings from STATS Poll released prior to the game; All times are in Eastern time

== Game summaries ==
=== At Delaware ===
	1	2	3	4	Total
Hornets	3	3	0	7	13
No. 22 Fightin' Blue Hens	3	13	9	6	31

=== Lincoln (PA) ===
	1	2	3	4	Total
Lions	0	0	12	0	12
Hornets	28	3	21	6	58

=== Howard ===
	1	2	3	4	Total
Bison	0	18	0	6	24
Hornets	7	2	0	0	9

=== At North Carolina A&T ===
	1	2	3	4	Total
Hornets	0	0	0	0	0
No. 17 Aggies	7	21	9	0	37

=== South Carolina State ===
	1	2	3	4	Total
Bulldogs	10	7	14	7	38
Hornets	0	3	7	14	24

=== At Morgan State ===
	1	2	3	4	Total
Hornets	0	0	3	0	3
Bears	7	14	3	10	34

=== Merrimack ===
	1	2	3	4	Total
Warriors	7	17	3	3	30
Hornets	14	7	0	0	21

=== At North Carolina Central ===
	1	2	3	4	Total
Hornets	3	10	0	10	23
Eagles	0	16	7	7	30

=== At Florida A&M ===
	1	2	3	4	Total
Hornets	0	3	20	7	30
No. 17 Rattlers	14	17	14	7	52

=== Bethune–Cookman ===
	1	2	3	4	Total
Wildcats	0	6	0	7	13
Hornets	9	7	0	0	16

=== Norfolk State ===
	1	2	3	4	Total
Spartans	0	16	7	10	33
Hornets	10	0	7	0	17

=== Saint Francis (PA) ===
	1	2	3	4	Total
Red Flash	14	14	7	0	35
Hornets	0	0	7	14	21
