= 2019 North Carolina Central Eagles football team =

American college football season

2019 North Carolina Central Eagles football
- Conference: Mid-Eastern Athletic Conference
- Record: 4–8 (3–5 MEAC)
- Head coach: Trei Oliver (1st season)
- Home stadium: O'Kelly–Riddick Stadium

2019 Mid-Eastern Athletic Conference football standings
| | Conf. | | | Overall |
| Team | W | | L | W | | L |
|---|---|---|---|---|---|---|
| No. 24 Florida A&M * | 7 | – | 1 | 9 | – | 2 |
| No. 20 North Carolina A&T + | 6 | – | 2 | 9 | – | 3 |
| South Carolina State + | 6 | – | 2 | 8 | – | 3 |
| Bethune–Cookman | 5 | – | 3 | 7 | – | 4 |
| Norfolk State | 4 | – | 4 | 5 | – | 7 |
| North Carolina Central | 3 | – | 5 | 4 | – | 8 |
| Howard | 2 | – | 6 | 2 | – | 10 |
| Morgan State | 2 | – | 6 | 3 | – | 9 |
| Delaware State | 1 | – | 7 | 2 | – | 10 |
+ – Conference co-champions; * Florida A&M ineligible for conference title due to NCAA sanctions; Rankings from STATS Poll

The 2019 North Carolina Central Eagles football team represented North Carolina Central University as a member of the Mid-Eastern Athletic Conference (MEAC) during the 2019 NCAA Division I FCS football season. Led by first-year head coach Trei Oliver, the Eagles compiled an overall record of 4–8 with a mark of 3–5, placing sixth in the MEAC. North Carolina Central played home games at O'Kelly–Riddick Stadium in Durham, North Carolina.

== Preseason ==
=== MEAC poll ===
In the MEAC preseason poll released on July 26, 2019, the Eagles were predicted to finish in fifth place.

=== Preseason All–MEAC teams ===
The Eagles had seven players selected to the preseason all-MEAC teams.

First Team Offense

Isaiah Totten – RB

Second Team Offense

Andrew Dale – OL

Third Team Offense

Somadina Okezie-Okeke – C

Ricky Lee – OL

First Team Defense

Darius Royster – DL

Kawuan Cox – DL

Third Team Defense

Branden Bailey – LB

== Schedule ==
| Date | Time | Opponent | Site | TV | Result | Attendance |
|---|---|---|---|---|---|---|
| August 29 | 8:00 p.m. | at Austin Peay* | Fortera Stadium; Clarksville, TN | ESPN+ | L 10–41 | 7,512 |
| September 7 | 6:00 p.m. | at No. 8 Towson* | Johnny Unitas Stadium; Towson, MD | TSN | L 3–42 | 8,322 |
| September 14 | 6:00 p.m. | at Gardner–Webb* | Spangler Stadium; Boiling Springs, NC | ESPN+ | L 12–21 | 4,315 |
| September 21 | 4:00 p.m. | Elizabeth City State* | O'Kelly–Riddick Stadium; Durham, NC | NCCU Sports Network | W 45–7 | 6,025 |
| September 28 | 6:00 p.m. | at Morgan State | Hughes Stadium; Baltimore, MD | ESPN3 | W 27–17 | 7,609 |
| October 5 | 2:00 p.m. | at Florida A&M | Bragg Memorial Stadium; Tallahassee, FL | ESPN3 | L 21–28 | 25,679 |
| October 10 | 6:00 p.m. | Bethune–Cookman | O'Kelly–Riddick Stadium; Durham, NC | ESPNU | L 13–27 | 5,261 |
| October 26 | 2:00 p.m. | Delaware State | O'Kelly–Riddick Stadium; Durham, NC | ESPN3 | W 30–23 | 5,026 |
| November 2 | 1:00 p.m. | at Howard | William H. Greene Stadium; Washington, D.C. | ESPN3 | W 28–6 | 1,096 |
| November 9 | 2:00 p.m. | Norfolk State^{†} | O'Kelly–Riddick Stadium; Durham, NC | ESPN3 | L 21–38 | 12,319 |
| November 16 | 2:00 p.m. | South Carolina State | O'Kelly–Riddick Stadium; Durham, NC | ESPN3 | L 0–24 | 3,043 |
| November 23 | 1:00 p.m. | at No. 25 North Carolina A&T | BB&T Stadium; Greensboro, NC (rivalry) | ESPN3 | L 0–54 | 19,853 |
*Non-conference game; ^{†}Homecoming; Rankings from STATS Poll released prior to the game; All times are in Eastern time

== Game summaries ==
=== At Austin Peay ===
| | 1 | 2 | 3 | 4 | Total |
|---|---|---|---|---|---|
| Eagles | 3 | 0 | 0 | 7 | 10 |
| Governors | 7 | 24 | 3 | 7 | 41 |

=== At Towson ===
| | 1 | 2 | 3 | 4 | Total |
|---|---|---|---|---|---|
| Eagles | 0 | 0 | 0 | 3 | 3 |
| No. 8 Tigers | 14 | 14 | 14 | 0 | 42 |

=== At Gardner–Webb ===
| | 1 | 2 | 3 | 4 | Total |
|---|---|---|---|---|---|
| Eagles | 3 | 6 | 0 | 3 | 12 |
| Runnin' Bulldogs | 0 | 7 | 7 | 7 | 21 |

=== Elizabeth City State ===
| | 1 | 2 | 3 | 4 | Total |
|---|---|---|---|---|---|
| Vikings | 0 | 7 | 0 | 0 | 7 |
| Eagles | 10 | 14 | 7 | 14 | 45 |

=== At Morgan State ===
| | 1 | 2 | 3 | 4 | Total |
|---|---|---|---|---|---|
| Eagles | 0 | 13 | 7 | 7 | 27 |
| Bears | 0 | 3 | 7 | 7 | 17 |

=== At Florida A&M ===
| | 1 | 2 | 3 | 4 | Total |
|---|---|---|---|---|---|
| Eagles | 0 | 7 | 7 | 7 | 21 |
| Rattlers | 7 | 7 | 0 | 14 | 28 |

=== Bethune–Cookman ===
| | 1 | 2 | 3 | 4 | Total |
|---|---|---|---|---|---|
| Wildcats | 0 | 7 | 7 | 13 | 27 |
| Eagles | 0 | 3 | 0 | 10 | 13 |

=== Delaware State ===
| | 1 | 2 | 3 | 4 | Total |
|---|---|---|---|---|---|
| Hornets | 3 | 10 | 0 | 10 | 23 |
| Eagles | 0 | 16 | 7 | 7 | 30 |

=== At Howard ===
| | 1 | 2 | 3 | 4 | Total |
|---|---|---|---|---|---|
| Eagles | 0 | 7 | 7 | 14 | 28 |
| Bison | 0 | 0 | 0 | 6 | 6 |

=== Norfolk State ===
| | 1 | 2 | 3 | 4 | Total |
|---|---|---|---|---|---|
| Spartans | 10 | 7 | 14 | 7 | 38 |
| Eagles | 7 | 0 | 7 | 7 | 21 |

=== South Carolina State ===
| | 1 | 2 | 3 | 4 | Total |
|---|---|---|---|---|---|
| Bulldogs | 7 | 7 | 10 | 0 | 24 |
| Eagles | 0 | 0 | 0 | 0 | 0 |

=== At North Carolina A&T ===
| | 1 | 2 | 3 | 4 | Total |
|---|---|---|---|---|---|
| Eagles | 0 | 0 | 0 | 0 | 0 |
| No. 25 Aggies | 16 | 14 | 24 | 0 | 54 |
