= 2019 Rhode Island Rams football team =

American college football season

2019 Rhode Island Rams football
- Conference: Colonial Athletic Association
- Record: 2–10 (0–8 CAA)
- Head coach: Jim Fleming (6th season)
- Offensive coordinator: Will Fleming (3rd season)
- Defensive coordinator: Pete Rekstis (6th season)
- Home stadium: Meade Stadium

2019 Colonial Athletic Association football standings
	Conf.			Overall
Team	W		L	W		L
No. 2 James Madison $^	8	–	0	14	–	2
No. 18 Albany ^	6	–	2	9	–	5
No. 15 Villanova ^	5	–	3	9	–	4
New Hampshire	5	–	3	6	–	5
Towson	4	–	4	7	–	5
Maine	4	–	4	6	–	6
Elon	4	–	4	5	–	6
Richmond	4	–	4	5	–	7
Delaware	3	–	5	5	–	7
William & Mary	3	–	5	5	–	7
Stony Brook	2	–	6	5	–	7
Rhode Island	0	–	8	2	–	10
$ – Conference champion; ^ – FCS playoff participant; Rankings from STATS Poll

The 2019 Rhode Island Rams football team represented the University of Rhode Island in the 2019 NCAA Division I FCS football season. They were led by sixth-year head coach Jim Fleming and played their home games at Meade Stadium. They were a member of the Colonial Athletic Association. They finished the season 2–10, 0–8 in CAA play to finish in last place.

== Preseason ==
=== CAA poll ===
In the CAA preseason poll released on July 23, 2019, the Rams were predicted to finish in eighth place.

=== Preseason All–CAA team ===
The Rams had two players selected to the preseason all-CAA team.

Offense

Aaron Parker – WR

Kyle Murphy – OL

== Schedule ==
Date	Time	Opponent	Site	TV	Result	Attendance	Source
August 31	2:00 p.m.	at Ohio*	Peden Stadium; Athens, OH	ESPN+	L 20–41	16,665	
September 7	7:00 p.m.	No. 21 Delaware	Meade Stadium; Kingston, RI	FloSports/Yurview	L 36–44 ^{3OT}	8,511	
September 21	6:00 p.m.	at New Hampshire	Wildcat Stadium; Durham, NH	FloSports	L 24–27	7,519	
September 28	7:00 p.m.	Stony Brook	Meade Stadium; Kingston, RI	FloSports/Yurview	L 27–31	6,104	
October 5	12:30 p.m.	at Brown*	Brown Stadium; Providence, RI (rivalry)	ESPN+	W 31–28	5,077	
October 12	4:00 p.m.	at Virginia Tech*	Lane Stadium; Blacksburg, VA	ACCN	L 17–34	51,716	
October 19	3:30 p.m.	at Albany	Bob Ford Field at Tom & Mary Casey Stadium; Albany, NY	FloSports	L 28–35	7,763	
October 26	1:00 p.m.	Elon	Meade Stadium; Kingston, RI	FloSports/Yurview	L 13–38	8,911	
November 2	1:00 p.m.	Merrimack*	Meade Stadium; Kingston, RI	FloSports/Yurview	W 45–14	3,091	
November 9	1:00 p.m.	at William & Mary	Zable Stadium; Williamsburg, VA	FloSports/Yurview	L 19–55	7,063	
November 16	12:00 p.m.	at Maine	Alfond Stadium; Orono, ME	FloSports	L 30–34	4,908	
November 23	12:00 p.m.	No. 2 James Madison	Meade Stadium; Kingston, RI	FloSports/Yurview	L 21–55	2,815	
*Non-conference game; Rankings from STATS Poll released prior to the game; All times are in Eastern time

== Game summaries ==
=== At Ohio ===
	1	2	3	4	Total
Rams	0	6	7	7	20
Bobcats	7	10	17	7	41

=== Delaware ===
	1	2	3	4	OT	2OT	3OT	Total
No. 21 Blue Hens	0	0	14	8	7	7	8	44
Rams	3	10	0	9	7	7	0	36

=== At New Hampshire ===
	1	2	3	4	Total
Rams	0	7	3	14	24
Wildcats	7	7	7	6	27

=== Stony Brook ===
	1	2	3	4	Total
Seawolves	7	0	7	17	31
Rams	0	0	7	20	27

=== At Brown ===
	1	2	3	4	Total
Rams	7	10	7	7	31
Bears	7	7	0	14	28

=== At Virginia Tech ===
	1	2	3	4	Total
Rams	0	6	11	0	17
Hokies	10	7	7	10	34

=== At Albany ===
	1	2	3	4	Total
Rams	7	7	7	7	28
Great Danes	0	6	22	7	35

=== Elon ===
	1	2	3	4	Total
Phoenix	7	0	17	14	38
Rams	3	3	7	0	13

=== Merrimack ===
	1	2	3	4	Total
Warriors	0	7	0	7	14
Rams	7	7	7	21	42

=== At William & Mary ===
	1	2	3	4	Total
Rams	0	6	6	7	19
Tribe	21	14	7	13	55

=== At Maine ===
	1	2	3	4	Total
Rams	7	3	14	6	30
Black Bears	0	3	10	21	34

=== James Madison ===
	1	2	3	4	Total
No. 2 Dukes	10	21	7	17	55
Rams	0	0	14	7	21

== Players drafted into the NFL ==
Round	Pick	Player	Position	NFL Club
5	171	Isaiah Coulter	WR	Houston Texans
