= 2019 Stony Brook Seawolves football team =

American college football season

2019 Stony Brook Seawolves football
- Conference: Colonial Athletic Association
- Record: 5–7 (2–6 CAA)
- Head coach: Chuck Priore (14th season)
- Co-offensive coordinators: Carmen Felus (3rd season); Chris Bache (3rd season)
- Defensive coordinator: Bobby McIntyre (3rd season)
- Home stadium: Kenneth P. LaValle Stadium

Uniform
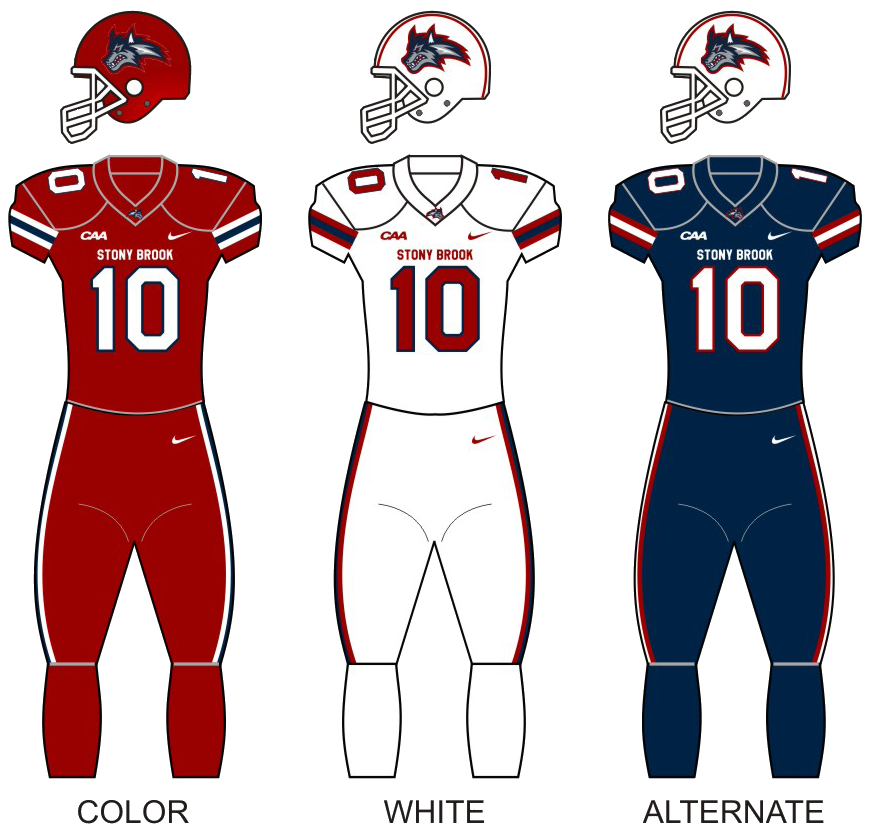

2019 Colonial Athletic Association football standings
	Conf.			Overall
Team	W		L	W		L
No. 2 James Madison $^	8	–	0	14	–	2
No. 18 Albany ^	6	–	2	9	–	5
No. 15 Villanova ^	5	–	3	9	–	4
New Hampshire	5	–	3	6	–	5
Towson	4	–	4	7	–	5
Maine	4	–	4	6	–	6
Elon	4	–	4	5	–	6
Richmond	4	–	4	5	–	7
Delaware	3	–	5	5	–	7
William & Mary	3	–	5	5	–	7
Stony Brook	2	–	6	5	–	7
Rhode Island	0	–	8	2	–	10
$ – Conference champion; ^ – FCS playoff participant; Rankings from STATS Poll

The 2019 Stony Brook Seawolves football team represented Stony Brook University in the 2019 NCAA Division I FCS football season. The Seawolves competed as seventh-year members of the Colonial Athletic Association with Chuck Priore as the head coach for his 14th season. They played their home games at Kenneth P. LaValle Stadium in Stony Brook, New York. They finished the season 5–7, 2–6 in CAA play to finish in 11th place.

== Preseason ==
=== CAA poll ===
In the CAA preseason poll released on July 23, 2019, the Seawolves were predicted to finish in sixth place.

=== Preseason All–CAA team ===
The Seawolves had three players selected to the preseason all-CAA team.

Offense

Kyle Nunez – OL

Defense

Sam Kamara – DL

Special teams

Isaiah White – SPEC

== Schedule ==
Date	Time	Opponent	Rank	Site	TV	Result	Attendance	Source
August 29	7:00 p.m.	Bryant*		Kenneth P. Lavalle Stadium; Stony Brook, NY	FloSports	W 35–10	9,652	
September 7	7:30 p.m.	at Utah State*		Maverik Stadium; Logan, UT	Stadium Facebook	L 7–62	22,247	
September 14	6:00 p.m.	Wagner*		Kenneth P. Lavalle Stadium; Stony Brook, NY	SNY	W 26–10	5,742	
September 21	6:00 p.m.	Fordham*		Kenneth P. Lavalle Stadium; Stony Brook, NY	FloSports	W 45–10	6,204	
September 28	7:00 p.m.	at Rhode Island		Meade Stadium; Smithfield, RI	FloSports/YurView	W 31–27	6,104	
October 5	6:00 p.m.	No. 2 James Madison^{†}	No. 24	Kenneth P. Lavalle Stadium; Stony Brook, NY	SNY	L 38–45 ^{OT}	12,812	
October 12	6:00 p.m.	New Hampshire	No. 22	Kenneth P. Lavalle Stadium; Stony Brook, NY	SNY	L 14–20	5,599	
October 26	3:30 p.m.	at No. 5 Villanova		Villanova Stadium; Villanova, PA	FloSports	W 36–35	5,109	
November 2	3:00 p.m.	at Richmond	No. 20	Robins Stadium; Richmond, VA	FloSports	L 10–30	7,209	
November 9	2:00 p.m.	No. 21 Towson		Kenneth P. Lavalle Stadium; Stony Brook, NY	FloSports	L 14–31	5,034	
November 16		at Delaware		Delaware Stadium; Newark, DE	FloSports	L 10–17	11,981	
November 23	2:00 p.m.	Albany		Kenneth P. Lavalle Stadium; Stony Brook, NY (rivalry)	SNY	L 26–31	6,171	
*Non-conference game; ^{†}Homecoming; Rankings from STATS Poll released prior to the game; All times are in Eastern time

== Game summaries ==
=== Bryant ===
	1	2	3	4	Total
Bulldogs	0	3	0	7	10
Seawolves	7	7	14	7	35

In redshirt junior quarterback Tyquell Fields' first career start, Stony Brook started off slowly with two straight three-and-outs. Synceir Malone returned an interception 22 yards for a touchdown to open the scoring for the Seawolves. Fields continued to struggle, throwing an interception, going three-and-out, and fumbling the ball at the Bryant 2-yard line in his next three drives. Although Bryant would chip away at the lead on a field goal, Stony Brook would score 28 unanswered points to go up 35–3 before the starters were pulled. The Seawolves' tough defense stifled Bryant, limiting the Bulldogs to 205 total yards and 38 rushing yards.

=== At Utah State ===
	1	2	3	4	Total
Seawolves	0	0	7	0	7
Aggies	17	17	14	14	62

Utah State controlled this game from the start, going up 41–0 by the third quarter before Stony Brook finally scored on a three-yard receiving touchdown by redshirt senior running back Isaiah White. Fields was removed from the game due to injury and junior Jack Cassidy earned much of the playing time, going 14-for-28 with 129 yards, a touchdown and an interception.

=== Wagner ===
	1	2	3	4	Total
Seahawks	0	0	3	7	10
Seawolves	3	10	13	0	26

Stony Brook extended its home winning streak to 11 straight games. The team put up 551 yards of total offense, backed by Tyquell Fields, who went 11-for-19 with a career-high 282 yards and a touchdown, and Isaiah White, who carried the ball 31 times for 131 yards and 2 TDs. The Seawolves' defense limited Wagner to 17 rushing yards on 12 attempts and forced two fumbles. Stony Brook went up 26–3 in the third quarter and held Wagner to 259 total yards.

=== Fordham ===
	1	2	3	4	Total
Rams	0	3	0	7	10
Seawolves	10	21	0	14	45

With the blowout victory, Stony Brook extended its home winning streak to 12. The Seawolves scored on five of their first six possessions to take a 31–3 lead entering halftime, and never looked back after going up 45–3. Fordham was held to 38 rushing yards on 30 attempts, and Stony Brook's offense recorded 601 total yards. Tyquell Fields went 9-for-12 with 232 yards and 3 TDs, while Seba Nekhet broke out for 182 yards and 2 TDs on 20 carries.

=== At Rhode Island ===
	1	2	3	4	Total
Seawolves	7	0	7	17	31
Rams	0	0	7	20	27

In their conference opener, Stony Brook struck first on an 11-yard TD pass from Tyquell Fields to Jean Constant. Fields then fumbled the ball at the Rhode Island 1-yard line and the game entered halftime with Stony Brook up 7–0. After Stony Brook went up 21–7 on an Isaiah White rushing TD, Rhode Island's Ahmere Dorsey returned a kickoff 99 yards for a touchdown to cut the lead to 21–14. Down by 10 with 1:42 left in the game, Rhode Island quarterback Vito Priore threw a TD to Isaiah Coulter to make it 24–21. Rhode Island recovered the following onside kick and Priore hit Aaron Parker for the TD with 1:05 left to go up 27–21 after a missed PAT. Stony Brook got the ball back and facing 4th and 6, Fields ran it in from 50 yards out for the touchdown with 11 seconds left to stun Rhode Island 31–27.

=== James Madison ===
	1	2	3	4	OT	Total
No. 2 Dukes	14	14	3	7	7	45
No. 24 Seawolves	14	7	7	10	0	38

Stony Brook's 12-game home winning streak dating back to October 7, 2017 was snapped in a homecoming thriller. The two teams traded touchdowns throughout the first half and James Madison took the lead late and went up 28–21 entering halftime. James Madison received the ball to start the second half and made it a two-possession game, but numerous Dukes turnovers helped Stony Brook get back in the game. With 1:44 left in the 4th quarter, Tyquell Fields drove Stony Brook down the field and Nick Courtney hit a career-high 47-yard field goal to tie the game at 38 with 0:05 remaining. In overtime, James Madison received the ball first and scored; on the ensuing Stony Brook possession, Fields hit Delante Hellams Jr. in the end zone on 4th and 18 but Hellams dropped the pass as James Madison narrowly escaped Long Island, almost falling victim to a massive upset.

=== New Hampshire ===
	1	2	3	4	Total
Wildcats	7	0	3	10	20
No. 22 Seawolves	0	7	7	0	14

Having not lost at home since 2017 before last week, Stony Brook dropped back-to-back home games after being upset by unranked New Hampshire at LaValle Stadium. The Wildcats struck first with a 15-yard TD pass by Max Brosmer, but the Seawolves responded with a Tyquell Fields 15-yard TD throw to tie the game. New Hampshire kicked a 22-yard field goal on their first possession coming out of halftime, but Stony Brook took a 14-10 lead on a 1-yard TD run by Ty Son Lawton. The Wildcats scored ten points in the fourth quarter to win, with an overturned Jean Constant punt return to the New Hampshire 5 proving costly for the Seawolves.

=== At Villanova ===
	1	2	3	4	Total
Seawolves	7	3	10	16	36
No. 5 Wildcats	7	21	0	7	35

Coming off of two straight losses and a bye week, Stony Brook went on the road to face No. 5 Villanova. The Seawolves started the scoring with a Tyquell Fields rushing TD off a blocked punt, but the Wildcats tied it up on a 68-yard trick play touchdown. Villanova scored three more touchdowns in the second quarter, taking advantage of poor Stony Brook defense to enter halftime with a 28–10 lead after Fields was picked off outside the red zone on the final drive of the first half. Villanova fumbled the second half kickoff, leading to a Stony Brook field goal, and Daniel Smith threw an interception on the next drive, which led to a Ty Son Lawton 10-yard TD run to cut the deficit to 28–20. Villanova went up 35–20 on a Dee Wil Barlee rush TD on 4th and goal at the 2 with 9:14 left. Stony Brook drove down the field and scored on an 11-yard TD pass from Fields to Shawn Harris Jr. with 4:45 left to make it 35–27. With 1:32 left, Fields ran it in on a QB sneak from the 1, but a two-point attempt was dropped by Andrew Trent, keeping it at 35–33. Stony Brook got the ball back with 21 seconds, and Fields connected with Nick Anderson on a 40-yard strike to bring them to the Villanova 5-yard line, where Nick Courtney kicked the game-winning 22-yard field goal as time expired for the 36–35 upset victory.

=== At Richmond ===
	1	2	3	4	Total
No. 20 Seawolves	3	7	0	0	10
Spiders	0	20	7	3	30

=== Towson ===
	1	2	3	4	Total
No. 21 Tigers	3	14	7	7	31
Seawolves	0	7	7	0	14

=== At Delaware ===
	1	2	3	4	Total
Seawolves	0	10	0	0	10
Fightin' Blue Hens	7	3	0	7	17

=== Albany ===
	1	2	3	4	Total
Great Danes	21	3	0	7	31
Seawolves	0	14	0	12	26

== Ranking movements ==
Ranking movements Legend: ██ Increase in ranking ██ Decrease in ranking — = Not ranked RV = Received votes
	Week													
Poll	Pre	1	2	3	4	5	6	7	8	9	10	11	12	Final
STATS FCS	RV	RV	RV	RV	RV	24	22	RV	RV	20				
Coaches	RV	RV	RV	RV	RV	24	23	RV	—	RV				
