= 2019 Towson Tigers football team =

American college football season

2019 Towson Tigers football
- Conference: Colonial Athletic Association
- Record: 7–5 (4–4 CAA)
- Head coach: Rob Ambrose (11th season)
- Defensive coordinator: Eric Daniels (1st season)
- Home stadium: Johnny Unitas Stadium

2019 Colonial Athletic Association football standings
	Conf.			Overall
Team	W		L	W		L
No. 2 James Madison $^	8	–	0	14	–	2
No. 18 Albany ^	6	–	2	9	–	5
No. 15 Villanova ^	5	–	3	9	–	4
New Hampshire	5	–	3	6	–	5
Towson	4	–	4	7	–	5
Maine	4	–	4	6	–	6
Elon	4	–	4	5	–	6
Richmond	4	–	4	5	–	7
Delaware	3	–	5	5	–	7
William & Mary	3	–	5	5	–	7
Stony Brook	2	–	6	5	–	7
Rhode Island	0	–	8	2	–	10
$ – Conference champion; ^ – FCS playoff participant; Rankings from STATS Poll

The 2019 Towson Tigers football team represented Towson University in the 2019 NCAA Division I FCS football season. They were led by eleventh-year head coach Rob Ambrose and played their home games at Johnny Unitas Stadium. They were a member of the Colonial Athletic Association. They finished the season 7–5, 4–4 in CAA play to finish in a four-way tie for fifth place.

== Preseason ==
=== CAA poll ===
In the CAA preseason poll released on July 23, 2019, the Tigers were predicted to finish in second place.

=== Preseason All–CAA team ===
The Tigers had five players selected to the preseason all-CAA team.

Offense

Tom Flacco – QB

Shane Simpson – RB

Shane Leatherbury – WR

Defense

Robert Heyward – LB

Special teams

Aidan O'Neill – K

== Schedule ==
Date	Time	Opponent	Rank	Site	TV	Result	Attendance	Source
August 31	3:00 p.m.	at The Citadel*	No. 11	Johnson Hagood Stadium; Charleston, SC	ESPN+	W 28–21	8,008	
September 7	6:00 p.m.	North Carolina Central*	No. 8	Johnny Unitas Stadium; Towson, MD	FloSports	W 42–3	8,322	
September 14	7:00 p.m.	at No. 7 Maine	No. 8	Alfond Stadium; Orono, ME	FloSports	W 45–23	6,256	
September 21	6:00 p.m.	No. 18 Villanova	No. 5	Johnny Unitas Stadium; Towson, MD	FloSports	L 45–52 ^{OT}	8,811	
September 28	4:00 p.m.	at No. 9 (FBS) Florida*	No. 10	Ben Hill Griffin Stadium; Gainesville, FL	SECN	L 0–38	79,126	
October 12	4:00 p.m.	Albany	No. 9	Johnny Unitas Stadium; Towson, MD	FloSports	L 21–38	4,809	
October 19	4:00 p.m.	Bucknell*	No. 18	Johnny Unitas Stadium; Towson, MD	FloSports	W 56–7	6,114	
October 26	3:30 p.m.	at No. 2 James Madison	No. 16	Bridgeforth Stadium; Harrisonburg, VA	FloSports	L 10–27	23,983	
November 2	2:00 p.m.	Delaware	No. 21	Johnny Unitas Stadium; Towson, MD	FloSports	W 31–24	5,522	
November 9	2:00 p.m.	at Stony Brook	No. 21	Kenneth P. Lavalle Stadium; Stony Brook, NY	FloSports	W 31–14	5,034	
November 16	1:00 p.m.	at William & Mary	No. 20	Zable Stadium; Williamsburg, VA	FloSports	W 31–10	6,738	
November 23	2:00 p.m.	Elon	No. 19	Johnny Unitas Stadium; Towson, MD	FloSports	L 23–25	4,537	
*Non-conference game; Rankings from STATS Poll released prior to the game; All times are in Eastern time

== Game summaries ==
=== At The Citadel ===
	1	2	3	4	Total
No. 11 Tigers	7	10	0	11	28
Bulldogs	0	14	0	7	21

=== North Carolina Central ===
	1	2	3	4	Total
Eagles	0	0	0	3	3
No. 8 Tigers	14	14	14	0	42

=== At Maine ===
	1	2	3	4	Total
No. 8 Tigers	10	7	14	14	45
No. 7 Black Bears	6	7	3	7	23

=== At Villanova ===
	1	2	3	4	OT	Total
No. 18 Wildcats	14	7	14	10	7	52
No. 5 Tigers	7	21	0	17	0	45

=== At Florida ===
	1	2	3	4	Total
No. 10 Tigers	0	0	0	0	0
No. 9 (FBS) Gators	7	10	14	7	38

=== Albany ===
	1	2	3	4	Total
Great Danes	7	10	14	7	38
No. 9 Tigers	7	7	7	0	21

=== Bucknell ===
	1	2	3	4	Total
Bison	0	7	0	0	7
No. 18 Tigers	21	21	14	0	56

=== At James Madison ===
	1	2	3	4	Total
No. 16 Tigers	0	10	0	0	10
No. 2 Dukes	7	17	3	0	27

=== Delaware ===
	1	2	3	4	Total
Fightin' Blue Hens	7	7	7	3	24
No. 21 Tigers	7	17	0	7	31

=== At Stony Brook ===
	1	2	3	4	Total
No. 21 Tigers	3	14	7	7	31
Seawolves	0	7	7	0	14

=== At William & Mary ===
	1	2	3	4	Total
No. 20 Tigers	14	10	7	0	31
Tribe	3	0	0	7	10

=== Elon ===
	1	2	3	4	Total
Phoenix	0	3	16	6	25
No. 19 Tigers	14	3	3	3	23

== Ranking movements ==
Ranking movements Legend: ██ Increase in ranking ██ Decrease in ranking RV = Received votes т = Tied with team above or below
	Week														
Poll	Pre	1	2	3	4	5	6	7	8	9	10	11	12	13	Final
STATS FCS	11	8	8	5	10	9	9	18	16	21	21	20	19	RV	RV
Coaches	12	9	8	5	10	10-T	9	20	17	22	21	21	20	RV	RV
