= 2019 Richmond Spiders football team =

American college football season

2019 Richmond Spiders football
- Conference: Colonial Athletic Association
- Record: 5–7 (4–4 CAA)
- Head coach: Russ Huesman (3rd season)
- Offensive coordinator: Jeff Durden (3rd season)
- Defensive coordinator: Adam Braithwaite (3rd season)
- Home stadium: E. Claiborne Robins Stadium

2019 Colonial Athletic Association football standings
	Conf.			Overall
Team	W		L	W		L
No. 2 James Madison $^	8	–	0	14	–	2
No. 18 Albany ^	6	–	2	9	–	5
No. 15 Villanova ^	5	–	3	9	–	4
New Hampshire	5	–	3	6	–	5
Towson	4	–	4	7	–	5
Maine	4	–	4	6	–	6
Elon	4	–	4	5	–	6
Richmond	4	–	4	5	–	7
Delaware	3	–	5	5	–	7
William & Mary	3	–	5	5	–	7
Stony Brook	2	–	6	5	–	7
Rhode Island	0	–	8	2	–	10
$ – Conference champion; ^ – FCS playoff participant; Rankings from STATS Poll

The 2019 Richmond Spiders football team represented the University of Richmond in the 2019 NCAA Division I FCS football season. They were led by third-year head coach Russ Huesman and played their home games at E. Claiborne Robins Stadium. The Spiders were a member of the Colonial Athletic Association. They finished the season 5–7, 4–4 in CAA play to finish in a four-way tie for fifth place.

== Preseason ==
=== CAA poll ===
In the CAA preseason poll released on July 23, 2019, the Spiders were predicted to finish in tenth place.

=== Preseason All-CAA team ===
Senior defensive lineman Maurice Jackson was named preseason defensive player of the year for the CAA and to the preseason all-conference team. Safety Daniel Jones was named honorable mention for the all-conference team.

== Schedule ==
Date	Time	Opponent	Site	TV	Result	Attendance	Source
August 29	7:00 p.m.	Jacksonville*	Robins Stadium; Richmond, VA	MASN, NBCS P	W 38–19	7,702	
September 7	3:30 p.m.	at Boston College*	Alumni Stadium; Chestnut Hill, MA	ACCN Extra	L 13–45	30,111	
September 14	6:00 p.m.	No. 25 Elon	Robins Stadium; Richmond, VA	NBCS WA+	L 20–42	7,703	
September 28	1:00 p.m.	at Fordham*	Coffey Field; Bronx, NY	Stadium	L 16–23	5,578	
October 5	2:00 p.m.	Albany	Robins Stadium; Richmond, VA	NBCS WA+	W 23–20	8,061	
October 12	12:00 p.m.	at No. 18 Maine	Alfond Stadium; Orono, ME	FloSports	W 24–17	5,126	
October 19	6:00 p.m.	Yale*	Robins Stadium; Richmond, VA	NBCS WA+	L 27–28	7,510	
October 26	1:00 p.m.	at No. 19 Delaware	Delaware Stadium; Newark, DE	FloSports	W 35–25	15,308	
November 2	3:00 p.m.	No. 20 Stony Brook^{†}	Robins Stadium; Richmond, VA	NBCS WA+	W 30–10	7,209	
November 9	1:00 p.m.	at No. 18 Villanova	Villanova Stadium; Villanova, PA	FloSports	L 28–35	4,151	
November 16	3:30 p.m.	at No. 2 James Madison	Bridgeforth Stadium; Harrisonburg, VA (rivalry)	MASN, SNY	L 6–48	21,947	
November 23	12:00 p.m.	William & Mary	Robins Stadium; Richmond, VA (Capital Cup)	WTVR, WTKR	L 15–21 ^{OT}	7,020	
*Non-conference game; ^{†}Homecoming; Rankings from STATS Poll released prior to the game; All times are in Eastern time

== Game summaries ==
=== Jacksonville ===
	1	2	3	4	Total
Dolphins	0	6	0	13	19
Spiders	14	17	7	0	38

=== At Boston College ===
	1	2	3	4	Total
Spiders	0	10	0	3	13
Eagles	21	14	10	0	45

=== Elon ===
	1	2	3	4	Total
No. 25 Phoenix	14	14	14	0	42
Spiders	0	7	6	7	20

=== At Fordham ===
	1	2	3	4	Total
Spiders	3	7	3	3	16
Rams	0	10	13	0	23

=== Albany ===
	1	2	3	4	Total
Great Danes	7	6	0	7	20
Spiders	10	13	0	0	23

=== At Maine ===
	1	2	3	4	Total
Spiders	7	14	3	0	24
No. 18 Black Bears	7	3	7	0	17

=== Yale ===
	1	2	3	4	Total
Bulldogs	0	7	7	14	28
Spiders	3	17	7	0	27

=== At Delaware ===
	1	2	3	4	Total
Spiders	21	7	7	0	35
No. 19 Fightin' Blue Hens	7	3	15	0	25

=== Stony Brook ===
	1	2	3	4	Total
No. 20 Seawolves	3	7	0	0	10
Spiders	0	20	7	3	30

=== At Villanova ===
	1	2	3	4	Total
Spiders	14	14	0	0	28
No. 18 Wildcats	14	7	0	14	35

=== At James Madison ===
	1	2	3	4	Total
Spiders	0	6	0	0	6
No. 2 Dukes	10	14	14	10	48

=== William & Mary ===
	1	2	3	4	OT	Total
Tribe	0	8	0	7	6	21
Spiders	0	10	2	3	0	15
