= 2019 Southeastern Louisiana Lions football team =

American college football season

2019 Southeastern Louisiana Lions football
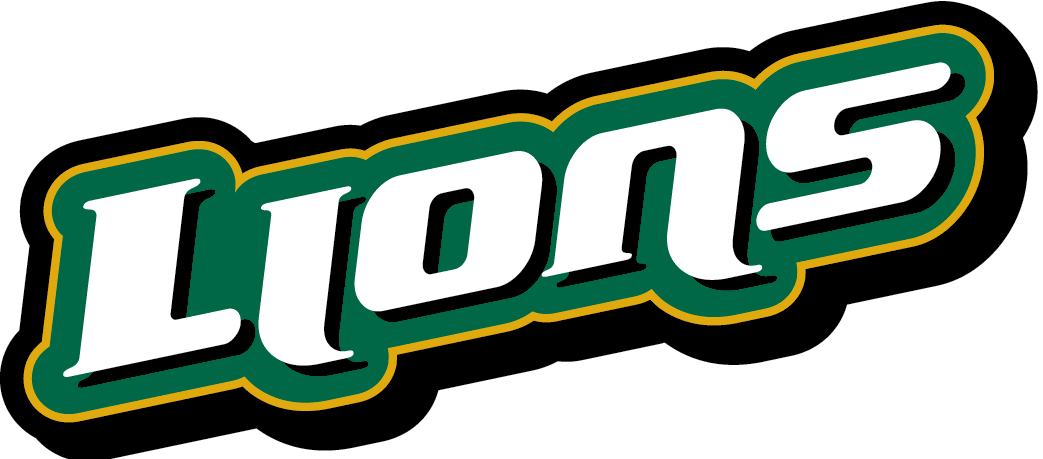

FCS Playoffs Second Round, L 28–73 vs. Montana
- Conference: Southland Conference

Ranking
- STATS: No. 19
- FCS Coaches: No. 18
- Record: 8–5 (6–3 Southland)
- Head coach: Frank Scelfo (2nd season)
- Offensive coordinator: Greg Stevens (4th season)
- Defensive coordinator: Lance Guidry (1st season)
- Home stadium: Strawberry Stadium

2019 Southland Conference football standings
	Conf.			Overall
Team	W		L	W		L
No. 14 Nicholls +^	7	–	2	8	–	4
No. 11 Central Arkansas +^	7	–	2	9	–	3
No. 19 Southeastern Louisiana ^	6	–	3	8	–	5
Sam Houston State	6	–	3	7	–	5
McNeese State	5	–	4	7	–	5
Incarnate Word	4	–	5	5	–	7
Abilene Christian	4	–	5	5	–	7
Northwestern State	3	–	6	3	–	9
Stephen F. Austin	3	–	6	3	–	9
Houston Baptist	2	–	6	5	–	7
Lamar	2	–	7	4	–	8
+ – Conference co-champions; ^ – FCS playoff participant; Rankings from STATS poll

The 2019 Southeastern Louisiana Lions football team represented Southeastern Louisiana University in the 2019 NCAA Division I FCS football season. The Lions were led by second-year head coach Frank Scelfo and played their home games at Strawberry Stadium. They were a member of the Southland Conference.

== Preseason ==
=== Preseason poll ===
The Southland Conference released their preseason poll on July 18, 2019. The Lions were picked to finish in eighth place.

=== Preseason All–Southland Teams ===
The Lions placed five different players on the preseason all–Southland teams.

Offense

1st team

Bransen Schwebel – TE/HB

Juwan Petit-Frere – WR

Defense

1st team

Juwan Petit-Frere – KR

Devonte Williams – PR

2nd team

Isaac Adeyemi-Berglund – DL

Austin Mitchell – PR

== Roster ==
2019 Southeastern Louisiana Lions football team roster
Players
Coaches
Offense

Pos.	#	Name	Class
RB	1	DeVonte Williams	Sr
WR	3	Anthony Spurlock	Fr
RB	4	Marcus Cooper	Sr
WR	5	Juwan Petit-Frere	Sr
QB	9	Chason Virgil	Sr
QB	10	Lorenzo Nunez	Sr
QB	11	Chris Penton	Fr
WR	12	Marquis Williams	Jr
QB	13	Jordan Loving	Fr
QB	15	Cole Kelley	Jr
WR	16	Justin Wendt	So
QB	17	Mason Schucker	So
RB	18	Jomari Becnel	Jr
WR	19	Javon Connor	Jr
RB	20	Elijah Karnjay	Fr
RB	21	Kendall Collins Jr.	Fr
RB	22	Taron Jones	So
FB	38	Damien Dawson	Jr
OL	52	Pat Allen	Sr
OL	54	Tyree' Rhodes	So
OL	56	Brockhim Wicks	Fr
OL	60	Jordan Tate	So
OL	61	Rendon Miles-Character	Jr
OL	62	William Granville	Fr
OL	63	Keanu Mookini	So
OL	64	Jason Evans	Fr
OL	65	Kaleb Hogg	Fr
OL	66	Wyatt Richthofen	Jr
OL	68	Calvin Legrone	Fr
OL	71	Alfred Beverly III	Sr
OL	72	Brennen Lanclos	Fr
OL	73	Jalen Bell	Jr
OL	74	Jarius Gooch	Sr
OL	78	Brendon Kelley	Fr
OL	79	Drew Jones	Jr
WR	80	Jacq'Co Price	Sr
WR	81	Austin Mitchell	Jr
WR	82	Daylon Richard	Fr
WR	83	CJ Turner	So
WR	84	Michael Corner Jr.	Fr
TE	85	Tanner Olsen	Fr
WR	87	Ed Magee	Fr
TE	88	Bransen Schwebel	Sr
TE	89	Matt DeBlaiso	Jr

Defense

Pos.	#	Name	Class
DB	2	Patrick Johnson	Jr
DB	6	Dejion Lynch	Sr
DB	7	Xavier Lewis	Sr
DB	8	Donniel Ward–Magee	So
DB	11	Matthew Wright	Jr
DB	12	Champ Craven	Fr
DB	14	Jacob Williams	Sr
DB	16	J'Vonte Powers	Fr
LB	17	Hunter Gill	Fr
DB	18	Derek Turner II	Fr
DB	20	Dontrell Smith	Fr
DB	21	Marquis Johnson	Fr
DB	22	Gregory Mahtook	Fr
DB	23	Ferlando Jordan	So
DB	24	Shawntrez Spears	Sr
DB	25	Tre' Spann	Sr
DB	26	Darrian Achane	Fr
DB	27	Justin Douglas	Fr
DB	28	Keith Benjamin	Sr
DB	29	Jaylin Armwood	Fr
LB	30	Alexis Ramos	Jr
DB	31	Robert Buquoi	Fr
LB	32	Mike Mason	Sr
LB	34	Arlen Williams	Fr
DB	36	Marcell Selmon Jr.	Jr
LB	39	Gerald Henderson	Fr
LB	40	Zeke Jenkins	Sr
DB	41	Kerry Moore	So
LB	42	Darian Richard	Fr
LB	43	Darrius Harry	Fr
DL	44	Dwaine Thomas	Sr
DL	45	Josh Carr Jr.	So
LB	46	Herman Christophe	Fr
LB	47	Gladar Huszar	Fr
LB	48	Davion Nassri	Fr
DL	49	Will Douglas	Jr
LB	50	Trae Drake	Jr
DL	53	Mike Henderson	Fr
DL	55	Steven Wright	Sr
LB	57	Josh Cook	Fr
DL	58	David Fields	Sr
DL	82	Ron Madison	Fr
LB	84	Terrance Coleman	Fr
DL	90	Feletoa Ailua	Jr
DL	91	Isaac Adeyemi-Berglund	Sr
DL	92	Eldridge Walker	Fr
DL	93	Fred Brown	Sr
LB	94	Dominic Lamm	Fr
DL	95	Ronald Cherry III	Jr
DL	96	Tainano Gaulua	Jr
DL	97	Tyrik Mitchell	Fr
DL	98	Noah Vance	So

Special teams

Pos.	#	Name	Class
K	26	Reece Aultman	Fr
P	26	Austin Dunlap	Fr
K	29	Bryce Broussard	So
K, P	33	Nathan Holliday	So
LS	51	Billy Walch	So
LS	70	Jake Rotenberry	So

Head coach

- Frank Scelfo (Louisiana–Monroe)

Coordinators/assistant coaches

- Greg Stevens (Eastern Oregon)
  Offensive coordinator/quarterbacks
- Lance Guidry (McNeese State)
  Defensive coordinator
- Raymond Monica (North Alabama)
  Defensive line
- Tarence Calais (Louisiana Tech)
  Defensive backs
- Kerry Joseph (McNeese State)
  Running backs, passing game coordinator
- A. J. Hopp (Slippery Rock)
  Offensive line
- Micheal Spurlock (Mississippi)
  Wide receivers
- Chris Lachney (Southeastern Louisiana)
  Linebackers
- Ross Jenkins (Louisiana Tech)
  Tight ends/Special Teams Coordinator/Recruiting Coordinator
- Joe Scelfo (South Alabama)
  Guards and Centers

Legend

- (C) Team captain
- (S) Suspended
- (I) Ineligible
- Injured
- Redshirt

Roster
Last update: April 22, 2020

== Schedule ==
Date	Time	Opponent	Rank	Site	TV	Result	Attendance
August 29	7:00 p.m.	No. 6 Jacksonville State*		Strawberry Stadium; Hammond, LA	ESPN+	W 35–14	7,116
September 7	3:00 p.m.	at Bethune–Cookman (Note: The game at Bethune–Cookman was canceled due to the expected impact of Hurricane Dorian on the Daytona Beach, Florida area.)*	No. 23	Daytona Stadium; Daytona Beach, FL		Canceled	
September 14	3:00 p.m.	at Ole Miss*	No. 23	Vaught–Hemingway Stadium; Oxford, MS	SECN	L 29–40	45,238
September 21	7:00 p.m.	Lamar	No. 21	Strawberry Stadium; Hammond, LA	ESPN+	W 45–34	6,352
September 28	6:00 p.m.	at Northwestern State	No. 19	Harry Turpin Stadium; Natchitoches, LA (rivalry)	CST, ESPN+	W 44–27	7,584
October 5	4:00 p.m.	at McNeese State	No. 17	Cowboy Stadium; Lake Charles, LA	CST, ESPN+	L 34–38	8,217
October 12	4:00 p.m.	Incarnate Word^{†}	No. 23	Strawberry Stadium; Hammond, LA	ESPN+	L 21–27	6,345
October 26	2:00 p.m.	at Houston Baptist		Husky Stadium; Houston, TX	ESPN3	W 52–13	2,158
November 2	4:00 p.m.	Stephen F. Austin		Strawberry Stadium; Hammond, LA	Southeastern Sports Network	W 47–30	5,127
November 9	3:00 p.m.	at No. 7 Central Arkansas		Estes Stadium; Conway, AR	ESPN+	W 34–0	6,275
November 16	1:00 p.m.	at Abilene Christian	No. 23	Wildcat Stadium; Abilene, TX	ESPN+	W 35–14	4,981
November 21	6:00 p.m.	No. 23 Nicholls	No. 21	Strawberry Stadium; Hammond, LA (River Bell Classic)	CST, ESPN+	L 27–28	10,071
November 30	3:00 p.m.	No. 8 Villanova*		Strawberry Stadium; Hammond, LA (NCAA Division I First Round)	ESPN3	W 45–44	4,173
December 7	2:00 p.m.	at No. 7 Montana*		Washington–Grizzly Stadium; Missoula, MT (NCAA Division I Second Round)	ESPN3	L 28–73	16,550
*Non-conference game; ^{†}Homecoming; Rankings from STATS Poll released prior to the game; All times are in Central time

== Game summaries ==
=== Jacksonville State ===
Jacksonville State at Southeastern Louisiana – Game summary

Quarter	1	2	3	4	Total
No. 6 Gamecocks	0	7	0	7	14
Lions	14	7	7	7	35

at Strawberry Stadium, Hammond, LA

- Date: August 29
- Game time: 7:00 p.m. CST
- Game attendance: 7,116
- Referee: Vidal Jones

Game information

First quarter

- (13:26) SELA TD – Devonte Williams 4-yard rush, Bryce Broussard kick
  Southeastern Louisiana 7–0; Drive: 1 play, 4 yards, 0:03
- (07:06) SELA TD – Bransen Schwebel 5-yard pass from Cole Kelley, Bryce Broussard kick
  Southeastern Louisiana 14–0; Drive: 9 plays, 80 yards, 3:57

Second quarter

- (14:33) JVST TD – Josh Pearson 33-yard pass from Zerrick Cooper, Bryant Wallace kick
  Southeastern Louisiana 14–7; Drive: 8 plays, 80 yards, 3:50
- (01:34) SELA TD – Devonte Williams 58-yard pass from Chason Virgil, Bryce Broussard kick
  Southeastern Louisiana 21–7; Drive: 6 plays, 90 yards, 1:08

Third quarter

- (10:45) SELA TD – Ferlando Johnson 65-yard interception returned, Bryce Broussard kick
  Southeastern Louisiana 28–7; Drive: 2 plays, 4 yards, 0:56

Fourth quarter

- (12:13) SELA TD – Austin Mitchell 35-yard pass from Cole Kelley, Bryce Broussard kick
  Southeastern Louisiana 35–7; Drive: 8 plays, 80 yards, 3:14
- (08:50) JVST TD – Michael Matthews 28-yard pass from Zerrick Cooper, Bryant Wallace kick
  Southeastern Louisiana 35–14; Drive: 10 plays, 80 yards, 3:18

Top passers

- SELA – Chason Virgil – 11/24, 164 yards, TD
- JVST – Zerrick Cooper – 40/52, 414 yards, 2 TD, 2 INT

Top rushers

- SELA – Devonte Williams – 12 carries, 37 yards, TD
- JVST – Michael Matthews – 4 carries, 38 yards

Top receivers

- SELA – Austin Mitchell – 4 receptions, 86 yards, TD
- JVST – Jamari Hester – 7 receptions, 90 yards

Statistics	Jacksonville State	Southeastern Louisiana
First downs	23	20
Total yards	481	384
Rushing yards	67	146
Passing yards	414	238
Turnovers	2	1
Time of possession	34:11	25:49

=== At Ole Miss ===
Southeastern Louisiana at Ole Miss – Game summary

Quarter	1	2	3	4	Total
No. 23 (FCS) Lions	3	14	12	0	29
Rebels	13	14	7	6	40

at Vaught-Hemingway Stadium, Oxford, MS

- Date: September 14
- Game time: 3:00 p.m. CST
- Game weather: 92 °F (33 °C); sunny
- Game attendance: 45,238
- Referee: James Carter
- TV: SEC Network

Game information

First quarter

- (11:01) MISS TD – Elijah Moore 9-yard pass from Matt Corral, Luke Logan PAT failed
  Ole Miss 6–0; Drive: 12 play, 72 yards, 3:59
- (06:47) SELA FG – Bryce Broussard 30-yard field goal
  Ole Miss 6–3; Drive: 8 play, 29 yards, 2:29
- (06:33) MISS TD – Jerrion Ealy 94-yard kickoff returned, Luke Logan kick
  Ole Miss 13–3; Drive: 0 play, 0 yards, 0:00

Second quarter

- (13:12) SELA TD – Marcus Cooper 14-yard rush, Bryce Broussard kick
  Ole Miss 13–10; Drive: 5 play, 57 yards, 2:05
- (12:28) MISS TD – Jerrion Ealy 30-yard rush, Luke Logan kick
  Ole Miss 20–10; Drive: 2 play, 82 yards, 0:47
- (06:29) SELA TD – Devonte Williams 20-yard rush, Bryce Broussard kick
  Ole Miss 20–17; Drive: 10 play, 74 yards, 4:33
- (00:54) MISS TD – Jason Pellerin 5-yard pass from Matt Corral, Luke Logan kick
  Ole Miss 27–17; Drive: 9 play, 52 yards, 3:35

Third quarter

- (10:27) MISS TD – Scottie Phillips 27-yard rush, Luke Logan kick
  Ole Miss 34–17; Drive: 9 play, 69 yards, 3:00
- (06:11) SELA TD – Juwan Petit-Frere 45-yard pass from Chason Virgil, Bryce Broussard PAT failed
  Ole Miss 34–23; Drive: 9 play, 78 yards, 4:10
- (01:26) SELA TD – Branson Schwebel 5-yard pass from Chason Virgil, two-point conversion attempt failed
  Ole Miss 34–29; Drive: 2 play, 9 yards, 0:42

Fourth quarter

- (10:38) MISS FG – Luke Logan 22-yard field goal
  Ole Miss 37–29; Drive: 14 play, 78 yards, 5:43
- (00:39) MISS FG – Luke Logan 32-yard field goal
  Ole Miss 40–29; Drive: 10 play, 69 yards, 4:39

Top passers

- MISS – Matt Corral – 21/30, 239 yards, 2 TD
- SELA – Chason Virgil – 29/44, 309 yards, 2 TD, 3 INT

Top rushers

- MISS – Scottie Phillips – 26 carries, 103 yards, TD
- SELA – Devonte Williams – 13 carries, 50 yards, TD

Top receivers

- MISS – Elijah Moore – 7 receptions, 88 yards, TD
- SELA – Juwan Petit-Frere – 3 receptions, 74 yards, TD

Statistics	Southeastern Louisiana	Ole Miss
First downs	20	24
Total yards	375	459
Rushing yards	66	220
Passing yards	309	239
Turnovers	4	2
Time of possession	27:56	32:04

=== Lamar ===
Lamar at Southeastern Louisiana – Game summary

Quarter	1	2	3	4	Total
Cardinals	7	17	3	7	34
No. 21 Lions	7	14	21	3	45

at Strawberry Stadium, Hammond, LA

- Date: September 14
- Game time: 7:00 p.m. CST
- Game weather: 76 °F (24 °C) • Weather: mostly cloudy • Wind: SE 7 MPH
- Game attendance: 6,352
- Referee: Dan Lewis
- TV: ESPN+

Game information

First quarter

- (05:26) LAM TD – Jordan Hoy 19-yard rush, Bailey Giffen kick
  Lamar 7–0; Drive: 6 plays, 64 yards, 2:26
- (00:44) SELA TD – Devonte Williams 12-yard rush, Bryce Broussard kick
  Tied 7–7; Drive: 11 plays, 75 yards, 4:42

Second quarter

- (14:54) LAM TD – A. J. Walker 6-yard rush, Bailey Giffen kick
  Lamar 14–7; Drive: 3 plays, 65 yards, 0:44
- (13:40) SELA TD – Austin Mitchell 58-yard pass from Chason Virgil, Bryce Broussard kick
  Tied 14–14; Drive: 4 plays, 74 yards, 1:05
- (05:44) LAM TD – Kenny Allen 36-yard pass from Jordan Hoy, Bailey Giffen kick
  Lamar 21–14; Drive: 4 plays, 65 yards, 1:39
- (01:24) SELA TD – CJ Turner 3-yard pass from Chason Virgil, Bryce Broussard kick
  Tied 21–21; Drive: 3 plays, 18 yards, 1:04
- (00:10) LAM FG – Bailey Giffen 38-yard field goal
  Lamar 24–21; Drive: 7 play, 54 yards, 1:12

Third quarter

- (09:59) SELA TD – Javon Conner 24-yard pass from Chason Virgil, Bryce Broussard kick
  Southeastern Louisiana 28–24; Drive: 6 plays, 64 yards, 2:45
- (08:51) SELA TD – Austin Mitchell 50-yard pass from Chason Virgil, Bryce Broussard kick
  Southeastern Louisiana 35–24; Drive: 1 play, 50 yards, 0:09
- (03:56) LAM FG – Bailey Giffen 47-yard field goal
  Southeastern Louisiana 35–27; Drive: 10 plays, 61 yards, 4:49
- (00:39) SELA TD – Javon Conner 14-yard pass from Chason Virgil, Bryce Broussard kick
  Southeastern Louisiana 42–27; Drive: 9 plays, 75 yards, 3:17

Fourth quarter

- (11:47) LAM TD – Myles Wanza 3-yard rush, Bailey Giffen kick
  Southeastern Louisiana 42–34; Drive: 10 plays, 75 yards, 3:52
- (01:48) SELA FG – Bryce Broussard 19-yard field goal
  Southeastern Louisiana 45–34; Drive: 15 plays, 87 yards, 5:54

Top passers

- SELA – Chason Virgil – 26/34, 307 yards, 4 TD
- LAM – Jordan Hoy – 14/33, 303 yards, TD, INT

Top rushers

- SELA – Devonte Williams – 16 carries, 63 yards, TD
- LAM – Myles Wanza – 13 carries, 60 yards, TD

Top receivers

- SELA – Austin Mitchell – 5 receptions, 136 yards, 2 TD
- LAM – Kirkland Banks – 5 receptions, 112 yards

Statistics	Lamar	Southeastern Louisiana
First downs	19	28
Total yards	436	520
Rushing yards	133	166
Passing yards	303	336
Turnovers	1	0
Time of possession	27:51	32:09

=== At Northwestern State ===
Southeastern Louisiana at Northwestern State – Game summary

Quarter	1	2	3	4	Total
No. 19 Lions	10	7	20	7	44
Demons	7	10	3	7	27

at Harry Turpin Stadium, Natchitoches, LA

- Date: September 28
- Game time: 6:00 p.m. CST
- Game weather: 87 °F (31 °C); sunny and warm
- Game attendance: 7,584
- Referee: Ed Bourgeois

Game information

First quarter

- (09:18) SELA FG – Bryce Broussard 34-yard field goal
  Southeastern Louisiana 3–0; Drive: 8 plays, 65 yards, 3:44
- (07:16) NSU TD – Quan Shorts 26-yard pass from Shelton Eppler, Ryan Gremillion kick
  Northwestern State 7–3; Drive: 5 plays, 61 yards, 1:54
- (03:49) SELA TD – Austin Mitchell 35-yard pass from Chason Virgil, Bryce Broussard kick
  Southeastern Louisiana 10–7; Drive: 8 plays, 85 yards, 3:27

Second quarter

- (09:17) NSU TD – Kendrick Price 19-yard pass from Shelton Eppler, Ryan Gremillion kick
  Northwestern State 14–10; Drive: 3 plays, 20 yards, 0:47
- (04:43) SELA TD – Cole Kelley 1-yard rush, Bryce Broussard kick
  Southeastern Louisiana 17–14; Drive: 10 plays, 71 yards, 4:27
- (00:00) NSU FG – Ryan Gremillion 24-yard field goal
  Tied 17–17; Drive: 15 plays, 72 yards, 4:37

Third quarter

- (09:12) NSU FG – Ryan Gremillion 25-yard field goal
  Northwestern State 20–17; Drive: 7 plays, 53 yards, 2:15
- (07:07) SELA TD – Taron Jones 5-yard rush, Bryce Broussard kick
  Southeastern Louisiana 24–20; Drive: 6 plays, 67 yards, 2:02
- (05:59) SELA TD – CJ Turner 46-yard pass from Cole Kelley, Bryce Broussard kick
  Southeastern Louisiana 31–20; Drive: 1 play, 46 yards, 0:07
- (00:52) SELA TD – Kendall Collins Jr. 25-yard rush, Bryce Broussard PAT failed
  Southeastern Louisiana 37–20; Drive: 8 plays, 86 yards, 3:51

Fourth quarter

- (04:30) NSU TD – Quan Shorts 17-yard pass from Shelton Eppler, Ryan Gremillion kick
  Southeastern Louisiana 37–27; Drive: 10 plays, 72 yards, 4:13
- (00:48) SELA TD – Taron Jones 2-yard rush, Bryce Broussard kick
  Southeastern Louisiana 44–27; Drive: 8 plays, 73 yards, 3:42

Top passers

- SELA – Chason Virgil – 24/32, 344 yards, TD
- NSU – Shelton Eppler – 35/55, 333 yards, 3 TD

Top rushers

- SELA – Taron Jones – 18 carries, 108 yards, 2 TD
- NSU – Jared West – 13 carries, 24 yards

Top receivers

- SELA – CJ Turner – 7 receptions, 128 yards, TD
- NSU – Quan Shorts – 11 receptions, 110 yards, 2 TD

Statistics	Southeastern Louisiana	Northwestern State
First downs	26	27
Total yards	537	378
Rushing yards	143	45
Passing yards	394	333
Turnovers	2	0
Time of possession	30:30	29:30

=== At McNeese State ===
Southeastern Louisiana at McNeese State – Game summary

Quarter	1	2	3	4	Total
No. 19 Lions	3	14	3	14	34
Cowboys	10	14	0	14	38

at Cowboy Stadium, Lake Charles, LA

- Date: October 5
- Game time: 4:00 p.m. CST
- Game weather: 92 °F (33 °C); sunny and humid
- Game attendance: 8,217
- Referee: Kevin Hassell

Game information

First quarter

- (09:48) MCNS TD – Davion Curtis 20-yard pass from Cody Orgeron, Bailey Raborn kick
  McNeese State 7–0; Drive: 7 plays, 36 yards, 2:30
- (04:45) MCNS FG – Bailey Raborn 21-yard field goal
  McNeese State 10–0; Drive: 10 plays, 36 yards, 3:37
- (00:07) SELA FG – Bryce Broussard 20-yard field goal
  McNeese State 10–3; Drive: 10 plays, 72 yards, 4:38

Second quarter

- (13:30) MCNS TD – Cyron Sutton 58-yard pas from Cody Orgeron, Bailey Raborn kick
  McNeese State 17–3; Drive: 6 plays, 83 yards, 1:33
- (05:35) MCNS TD – Elijah Mack 2-yard rush, Bailey Raborn kick
  McNeese State 24–3; Drive: 7 plays, 57 yards, 3:48
- (02:42) SELA TD – CJ Turner 10-yard pass from Chason Virgil, Bryce Broussard kick
  McNeese State 24–10; Drive: 7 plays, 62 yards, 2:48
- (00:23) SELA TD – Lorenzo Nunez 31-yard pass from Cole Kelley, Bryce Broussard kick
  Southeastern Louisiana 24–17; Drive: 13 plays, 94 yards, 1:37

Third quarter

- (01:09) SELA FG – Bryce Broussard 21-yard field goal
  McNeese State 24–20; Drive: 10 plays, 77 yards, 4:06

Fourth quarter

- (13:02) SELA TD – Lorenzo Nunez 60-yard pass from Chason Virgil, Bryce Broussard kick
  Southeastern Louisiana 27–24; Drive: 6 plays, 80 yards, 1:46
- (09:56) MCNS TD – Elijah Mack 1-yard rush, Bailey Raborn kick
  McNeese State 31–27; Drive: 8 plays, 77 yards, 3:00
- (07:06) SELA TD – Bransen Schwebel 2-yard pass from Cole Kelley, Bryce Broussard kick
  Southeastern Louisiana 34–31; Drive: 6 plays, 65 yards, 2:50
- (02:21) MCNS TD – Trevor Begue 33-yard pass from Cody Orgeron, Bailey Raborn kick
  McNeese State 38–34; Drive: 9 plays, 89 yards, 2:35

Top passers

- MCNS – Cody Orgeron – 12/29, 248 yards, 3 TD
- SELA – Chason Virgil – 27/49, 321 yards, 2 TD, INT

Top rushers

- MCNS – Elijah Mack – 28 carries, 142 yards, 2 TD
- SELA – Austin Mitchell – carry, 36 yards

Top receivers

- MCNS – Cyron Sutton – 4 receptions, 82 yards, TD
- SELA – Bransen Schwebel – 8 receptions, 94 yards, TD

Statistics	Southeastern Louisiana	McNeese State
First downs	19	23
Total yards	452	473
Rushing yards	86	225
Passing yards	366	248
Turnovers	2	0
Time of possession	28:57	31:03

=== Incarnate Word ===
Incarnate Word at Southeastern Louisiana – Game summary

Quarter	1	2	3	4	Total
Cardinals	3	14	3	7	27
No. 23 Lions	7	7	0	7	21

at Strawberry Stadium, Hammond, LA

- Date: October 12
- Game time: 4:00 p.m. CST
- Game weather: 72 °F (22 °C); cloudy
- Game attendance: 6,345
- Referee: Vidal Jones

Game information

First quarter

- (10:11) SELA TD – Austin Mitchell 48-yard pass from Chason Virgil, Bryce Broussard kick
  Southeastern Louisiana 7–0; Drive: 8 plays, 89 yards, 3:32
- (00:29) UIW FG – Carson Mohr 25-yard field goal
  Southeastern Louisiana 7–3; Drive: 6 plays, 25 yards, 2:09

Second quarter

- (14:49) UIW TD – Isaiah Paul 45-yard interception returned, Carson Mohr kick
  Incarnate Word 10–7; Drive: 3 plays, 5 yards, 0:33
- (04:09) UIW TD – Brady Rogers 18-yard pass from Jon Copeland, Carson Mohr kick
  Incarnate Word 17–7; Drive: 8 plays, 80 yards, 2:55
- (01:12) SELA TD – Cole Kelley 1-yard rush, Bryce Broussard kick
  Incarnate Word 17–14; Drive: 6 plays, 51 yards, 2:46

Third quarter

- (04:39) UIW FG – Carson Mohr 19-yard field goal
  Incarnate Word 20–14; Drive: 9 plays, 62 yards, 4:03

Fourth quarter

- (09:23) UIW TD – Lamont Johnson 21-yard pass from Jon Copeland, Carson Mohr kick
  Incarnate Word 27–14; Drive: 12 plays, 76 yards, 5:41
- (05:54) SELA TD – Marcus Cooper 16-yard rush, Bryce Broussard kick
  Incarnate Word 27–21; Drive: 9 plays, 84 yards, 2:05

Top passers

- UIW – Jon Copeland – 14/27, 147 yards, 2 TD
- SELA – Chason Virgil – 33/46, 337 yards, TD, 4 INT

Top rushers

- UIW – Ameer King – 18 carries, 94 yards
- SELA – Marcus Cooper – 9 carries, 59 yards, TD

Top receivers

- UIW – Lamont Johnson – 3 receptions, 37 yards, TD
- SELA – Austin Mitchell – 4 receptions, 87 yards, TD

Statistics	Incarnate Word	Southeastern Louisiana
First downs	20	24
Total yards	317	515
Rushing yards	170	178
Passing yards	147	337
Turnovers	0	6
Time of possession	29:42	30:18

=== At Houston Baptist ===
Southeastern Louisiana at Houston Baptist – Game summary

Quarter	1	2	3	4	Total
Lions	14	14	17	7	52
Huskies	6	7	0	0	13

at Husky Stadium, Houston, TX

- Date: October 26
- Game time: 2:00 p.m. CST
- Game weather: 60 °F (16 °C); partly cloudy
- Game attendance: 2,158
- Referee: Dan Lewis

Game information

First quarter

- (14:43) SELA TD – Lorenzo Nunez 80-yard pass from Chason Virgil, Bryce Broussard kick
  Southeastern Louisiana 7–0; Drive: 1 play, 80 yards, 0:17
- (11:32) HBU FG – Gino Garcia 43-yard field goal
  Southeastern Louisiana 7–3; Drive: 8 plays, 16 yards, 2:04
- (07:08) HBU FG – Gino Garcia 31-yard field goal
  Southeastern Louisiana 7–6; Drive: 7 plays, 17 yards, 2:41
- (02:32) SELA TD – Taron Jones 4-yard rush, Bryce Broussard kick
  Southeastern Louisiana 14–6; Drive: 11 plays, 75 yards, 4:36

Second quarter

- (04:18) SELA TD – Ferlando Jordan 97-yard interception returned, Bryce Broussard kick
  Southeastern Louisiana 21–6; Drive: 2 plays, 5 yards, 0:15
- (02:05) HBU TD – Jerreth Sterns 6-yard rush, Bryce Broussard kick
  Southeastern Louisiana 21–13; Drive: 8 plays, 59 yards, 2:03
- (00:39) SELA TD – CJ Turner 15-yard pass from Chason Virgil, Bryce Broussard kick
  Southeastern Louisiana 28–13; Drive: 10 plays, 63 yards, 1:16

Third quarter

- (14:29) SELA TD – Devonte Williams 25-yard rush, Bryce Broussard kick
  Southeastern Louisiana 35–13; Drive: 2 plays, 38 yards, 0:21
- (07:34) SELA FG – Bryce Broussard 24-yard field goal
  Southeastern Louisiana 38–13; Drive: 15 plays, 75 yards, 5:51
- (04:41) SELA TD – Austin Mitchell 70-yard pass from Chason Virgil, Bryce Broussard kick
  Southeastern Louisiana 45–13; Drive: 3 plays, 75 yards, 1:20

Fourth quarter

- (06:35) SELA TD – Matt DeBlaiso 21-yard pass from Cole Kelley, Bryce Broussard kick
  Southeastern Louisiana 52–13; Drive: 11 plays, 67 yards, 6:13

Top passers

- SELA - Chason Virgil - 22/31, 388 yards, 3 TD
- HBU - Bailey Zappe - 22/42, 156 yards, INT

Top rushers

- SELA - Devonte Williams - 11 carries, 51 yards, TD
- HBU - Ean Beek - 13 carries, 45 yards

Top receivers

- SELA - Austin Mitchell - 2 receptions, 89 yards, TD
- HBU - DJ Dormeus - 5 receptions, 62 yards

Statistics	Southeastern Louisiana	Houston Baptist
First downs	32	15
Total yards	634	259
Rushing yards	145	48
Passing yards	489	211
Turnovers	2	3
Time of possession	36:36	23:24

=== Stephen F. Austin ===
Stephen F. Austin at Southeastern Louisiana – Game summary

Quarter	1	2	3	4	Total
Lumberjacks	0	10	7	13	30
Lions	13	6	14	14	47

at Strawberry Stadium, Hammond, LA

- Date: November 2
- Game time: 4:00 p.m. CST
- Game weather: 64 °F (18 °C); clear
- Game attendance: 5,127
- Referee: Ed Bourgeois

Game information

First quarter

- (06:37) SELA TD – Cole Kelley 3-yard rush, Two-point conversion rush failed
  Southeastern Louisiana 6–0; Drive: 12 plays, 85 yards, 5:05
- (03:53) SELA TD – Ed Magee 8-yard rush, Bryce Broussard kick
  Southeastern Louisiana 13–0; Drive: 4 plays, 40 yards, 1:35

Second quarter

- (14:16) SFA TD – Allen Arclies III 27-yard pass from Trae Self, Storm Ruiz kick
  Southeastern Louisiana 13–7; Drive: 9 plays, 75 yards, 4:33
- (04:04) SELA TD – Cole Kelley 1-yard rush, Bryce Broussard PAT blocked
  Southeastern Louisiana 19–7; Drive: 10 plays, 76 yards, 4:30
- (00:00) SFA FG – Storm Ruiz 29-yard field goal
  Southeastern Louisiana 19–10; Drive: 8 plays, 32 yards, 1:16

Third quarter

- (09:44) SFA TD – Josh McGowen 2-yard rush, Storm Ruiz kick
  Southeastern Louisiana 19–17; Drive: 9 plays, 80 yards, 3:51
- (04:41) SELA TD – Devonte Williams 2-yard pass from Cole Kelley, Bryce Broussard kick
  Southeastern Louisiana 26–17; Drive: 10 plays, 65 yards, 5:03
- (01:26) SELA TD – Austin Mitchell 15-yard pass from Chason Virgil, Bryce Broussard kick
  Southeastern Louisiana 33–17; Drive: 6 plays, 70 yards, 2:16

Fourth quarter

- (13:34) SFA TD – Xavier Gipson 12-yard pass from Trae Self, Two-point conversion pass failed
  Southeastern Louisiana 33-23; Drive: 9 plays, 70 yards, 2:36
- (07:17) SELA TD – Ferlando Jordan 65-yard interception returned, Bryce Broussard kick
  Southeastern Louisiana 40–23; Drive: 11 plays, 59 yards, 4:49
- (05:31) SFA TD – Lar'Darion Cobb 20-yard pass from Cam Arnold, Storm Ruiz kick
  Southeastern Louisiana 40–30; Drive: 4 plays, 60 yards, 1:36
- (00:37) SELA TD – Taron Jones 1-yard rush, Bryce Broussard kick
  Southeastern Louisiana 47–30; Drive: 9 plays, 46 yards, 4:53

Top passers

- SELA – Chason Virgil – 15/21, 122 yards, TD, INT
- SFA – Trae Self – 25/39, 332 yards, 2 TD, INT

Top rushers

- SELA – Devonte Williams – 8 carries, 65 yards
- SFA – Josh McGowen – 16 carries, 63 yards, TD

Top receivers

- SELA – Devonte Williams – 11 receptions, 71 yards, TD
- SFA – Xavier Gipson – 8 receptions, 94 yards, TD

Statistics	Stephen F. Austin	Southeastern Louisiana
First downs	27	24
Total yards	471	421
Rushing yards	68	222
Passing yards	403	199
Turnovers	2	1
Time of possession	30:25	29:35

=== At Central Arkansas ===
Southeastern Louisiana at Central Arkansas – Game summary

Quarter	1	2	3	4	Total
Lions	7	14	6	7	34
No. 7 Bears	0	0	0	0	0

at Estes Stadium, Conway, AR

- Date: November 9
- Game time: 3:00 p.m. CST
- Game weather: 59 °F (15 °C); sunny
- Game attendance: 6,275
- Referee: David Alvarez

Game information

First quarter

- (05:52) SELA TD – Cole Kelley 9-yard rush, Bryce Broussard kick
  Southeastern Louisiana 7–0; Drive: 8 plays, 75 yards, 2:17

Second quarter

- (11:56) SELA TD – Cole Kelley 2-yard rush, Bryce Broussard kick
  Southeastern Louisiana 14–0; Drive: 9 plays, 80 yards, 4:04
- (00:07) SELA TD – Cole Kelley 2-yard rush, Bryce Broussard kick
  Southeastern Louisiana 21–0; Drive: 16 plays, 91 yards, 8:45

Third quarter

- (07:30) SELA TD – Javon Conner 6-yard pass from Cole Kelley, Bryce Broussard PAT blocked
  Southeastern Louisiana 27–0; Drive: 6 plays, 23 yards, 3:18

Fourth quarter

- (10:12) SELA TD – Cole Kelley 1-yard rush, Bryce Broussard kick
  Southeastern Louisiana 34–0; Drive: 8 plays, 75 yards, 4:06

Top passers

- SELA – Cole Kelley – 20/24, 273 yards, TD, INT
- UCA – Breylin Smith – 17/39, 193 yards, 3 INT

Top rushers

- SELA – Taron Jones – 16 carries, 69 yards
- UCA – D'erek Fernandez – 3 carries, 34 yards

Top receivers

- SELA – Devonte Williams – 6 receptions, 86 yards
- UCA – Jarrod Barnes – 3 receptions, 43 yards

Statistics	Southeastern Louisiana	Central Arkansas
First downs	26	13
Total yards	490	261
Rushing yards	153	68
Passing yards	337	193
Turnovers	2	4
Time of possession	38:08	21:52

=== At Abilene Christian ===
Southeastern Louisiana at Abilene Christian – Game summary

Quarter	1	2	3	4	Total
No. 23 Lions	14	21	0	7	42
Wildcats	0	7	0	7	14

at Wildcat Stadium, Abilene, TX

- Date: November 16
- Game time: 1:00 p.m. CST
- Game weather: 65 °F (18 °C); sunny, partly cloudy
- Game attendance: 4,981
- Referee: Vidal Jones

Game information

First quarter

- (11:23) SELA TD – Devonte Williams 6-yard rush, Bryce Broussard kick
  Southeastern Louisiana 7–0; Drive: 6 plays, 63 yards, 1:49
- (05:29) SELA TD – Matt DeBlaiso 53-yard pass from Chason Virgil, Bryce Broussard kick
  Southeastern Louisiana 14–0; Drive: 2 plays, 53 yards, 0:35

Second quarter

- (06:06) ACU TD – Sema'J Davis 2-yard rush, Blair Zepeda kick
  Southeastern Louisiana 14–7; Drive: 5 plays, 80 yards, 2:52
- (02:36) SELA TD – Chason Virgil 13-yard rush, Bryce Broussard kick
  Southeastern Louisiana 21–7; Drive: 8 plays, 37 yards, 3:25
- (00:53) SELA TD – Devonte Williams 9-yard rush, Bryce Broussard kick
  Southeastern Louisiana 28–7; Drive: 5 plays, 53 yards, 0:51
- (00:05) SELA TD – Javon Conner 4-yard pass from Chason Virgil, Bryce Broussard kick
  Southeastern Louisiana 35–7; Drive: 3 plays, 12 yards, 0:22

Fourth quarter

- (12:43) ACU TD – Branden Hohenstein 15-yard pass from Sema'J Davis, Blair Zepeda kick
  Southeastern Louisiana 35–14; Drive: 8 plays, 46 yards, 2:38

Top passers

- SELA – Chason Virgil – 19/30, 204 yards, 2 TD
- ACU – Sema'J Davis – 11/19, 195 yards, TD, 3 INT

Top rushers

- SELA – Devonte Williams – 9 carries, 48 yards, 2 TD
- ACU – Sema'J Davis – 17 carries, 33 yards, TD

Top receivers

- SELA – CJ Turner – 7 receptions, 74 yards
- ACU – Kobe Clark – 6 receptions, 104 yards

Statistics	Southeastern Louisiana	Abilene Christian
First downs	22	12
Total yards	432	283
Rushing yards	152	35
Passing yards	280	248
Turnovers	1	6
Time of possession	36:27	23:33

=== Nicholls ===
Nicholls at Southeastern Louisiana – Game summary

Quarter	1	2	3	4	Total
No. 23 Colonels	0	14	7	7	28
No. 21 Lions	14	0	0	13	27

at Strawberry Stadium, Hammond, LA

- Date: November 21
- Game time: 6:00 p.m. CST
- Game weather: 70 °F (21 °C); partly cloudy
- Game attendance: 10,071
- Referee: Ed Bourgeois

Game information

First quarter

- (04:45) SELA TD – Devonte Williams 2-yard pas from Cole Kelley, Bryce Broussard kick
  Southeastern Louisiana 7–0; Drive: 10 plays, 81 yards, 4:40
- (00:00) SELA TD – Devonte Williams 61-yard punt returned, Bryce Broussard kick
  Southeastern Louisiana 14–0; Drive: 3 plays, 1 yard, 1:41

Second quarter

- (11:43) NICH TD – Dai'Jean Dixon 48-yard pass from Chase Fourcade, Gavin Lasseigne kick
  Southeastern Louisiana 14–7; Drive: 6 plays, 88 yards, 3:10
- (05:34) NICH TD – Dai'Jean Dixon 2-yard pass from Chase Fourcade, Gavin Lasseigne kick
  Tied 14–14; Drive: 9 plays, 91 yards, 4:31

Third quarter

- (00:20) NICH TD – Julien Gums 5-yard rush, Gavin Lasseigne kick
  Nicholls 21–14; Drive: 9 plays, 66 yards, 4:38

Fourth quarter

- (11:34) SELA TD – Devonte Williams 4-yard rush, Bryce Broussard kick
  Tied 21–21; Drive: 10 plays, 82 yards, 3:40
- (02:21) SELA TD – Austin Mitchell 17-yard pass from Chason Virgil, Bryce Broussard PAT failed
  Southeastern Louisiana 27–21; Drive: 3 plays, 29 yards, 0:46
- (01:30) NICH TD – Dai'Jean Dixon 57-yard pass from Chase Fourcade, Gavin Lasseigne kick
  Nicholls 28–27; Drive: 3 plays, 78 yards, 0:45

Top passers

- NICH – Chase Fourcade – 19/27, 288 yards, 3 TD, INT
- SELA – Chason Virgil – 25/45, 321 yards, TD, INT

Top rushers

- NICH – Julien Gums – 18 carries, 133 yards, TD
- SELA – Devonte Williams – 16 carries, 75 yards, TD

Top receivers

- NICH – Dai'Jean Dixon – 9 receptions, 190 yards, 3 TD
- SELA – Austin Mitchell – 8 receptions, 99 yards, TD

Statistics	Nicholls	Southeastern Louisiana
First downs	17	26
Total yards	468	460
Rushing yards	180	113
Passing yards	288	347
Turnovers	2	2
Time of possession	31:15	28:45

== FCS Playoffs ==
The Lions were selected for the postseason tournament, with a first-round pairing against Villanova.

=== Villanova (first round) ===
Villanova at Southeastern Louisiana – Game summary

Quarter	1	2	3	4	Total
No. 8 Wildcats	10	21	0	13	44
No. 24 Lions	7	7	17	14	45

at Strawberry Stadium, Hammond, LA

- Date: November 30
- Game time: 3:00 p.m. CST
- Game weather: 83 °F (28 °C); mostly cloudy
- Game attendance: 4,173
- Referee: Kelly Holman

Game information

First quarter

- (06:56) NOVA FG – Drew Kresge 38-yard field goal
  Villanova 3–0; Drive: 11 plays, 43 yards, 5:21
- (04:30) SELA TD – Devonte Williams 10-yard rush, Bryce Broussard kick
  Southeastern Louisiana 7–3; Drive: 5 plays, 74 yards, 2:21
- (00:10) NOVA TD – Todd Summers 4-yard pass from Daniel Smith, Drew Kresge kick
  Villanova 10–7; Drive: 7 plays, 63 yards, 4:13

Second quarter

- (07:17) NOVA TD –Elijah Glover 78-yard interception returned, Drew Kresge kick
  Villanova 17–7; Drive: 8 plays, 46 yards, 3:40
- (03:28) NOVA TD – Daniel Smith 53-yard rush, Drew Kresge kick
  Villanova 24–7; Drive: 5 plays, 73 yards, 2:38
- (01:33) SELA TD – Cole Kelley 1-yard rush, Bryce Broussard kick
  Villanova 24–14; Drive: 6 plays, 69 yards, 1:47
- (00:28) NOVA TD – Jaaron Hayek 57-yard pass from Daniel Smith, Drew Kresge kick
  Villanova 31–14; Drive: 4 plays, 78 yards, 0:55

Third quarter

- (10:31) SELA TD – Cole Kelley 3-yard rush, Bryce Broussard kick
  Villanova 31–21; Drive: 8 plays, 90 yards, 2:50
- (06:31) SELA TD – CJ Turner 29-yard pass from Chason Virgil, Bryce Broussard kick
  Villanova 31–28; Drive: 4 plays, 85 yards, 1:02
- (01:29) SELA FG – Bryce Broussard 25-yard field goal
  Tied 31–31; Drive: 7 plays, 28 yards, 2:47

Fourth quarter

- (13:06) NOVA TD – Todd Summers 1-yard pass from Daniel Smith, Drew Kresge kick
  Villanova 38–31; Drive: 8 plays, 79 yards, 3:17
- (06:36) SELA TD – Javon Conner 4-yard pass from Chason Virgil, Bryce Broussard kick
  Tied 38–38; Drive: 11 plays, 65 yards, 4:06
- (04:36) NOVA TD – Changa Hodge 50-yard pass from Daniel Smith, Drew Kresge PAT failed
  Villanova 44–38; Drive: 4 plays, 75 yards, 1:53
- (02:56) SELA TD – CJ Turner 8-yard pass from Chason Virgil, Bryce Broussard kick
  Southeastern Louisiana 45–44; Drive: 7 plays, 75 yards, 1:40

Top passers

- SELA – Chason Virgil – 36/49, 474 yards, 3 TD, INT
- NOVA – Daniel Smith – 19/30, 283 yards, 4 TD

Top rushers

- SELA – Devonte Williams – 12 carries, 78 yards, TD
- NOVA – Daniel Smith – 7 carries, 90 yards, TD

Top receivers

- SELA – CJ Turner – 11 receptions, 173 yards, 2 TD
- NOVA – Jaaron Hayek – 6 receptions, 105 yards, TD

Statistics	Villanova	Southeastern Louisiana
First downs	21	31
Total yards	501	602
Rushing yards	218	94
Passing yards	283	508
Turnovers	0	3
Time of possession	32:44	27:16

=== At Montana (second round) ===
Southeastern Louisiana at Montana – Game summary

Quarter	1	2	3	4	Total
No. 24 Lions	7	14	7	0	28
No. 6 Grizzlies	10	28	20	15	73

at Washington–Grizzly Stadium, Missoula, MT

- Date: December 7
- Game time: 1:00 p.m. CST
- Game weather: 36 °F (2 °C); cloudy
- Game attendance: 16,550
- Referee: Joe Caruso

Game information

First quarter

- (09:27) SELA TD – Javon Conner 29-yard pas from Chason Virgil, Bryce Broussard kick
  Southeastern Louisiana 7–0; Drive: 11 plays, 75 yards, 5:33
- (09:13) MONT TD – Samori Toure 62-yard pass from Dalton Sneed, Brandon Purty kick
  Tied 7–7; Drive: 1 play, 62 yards, 0:07
- (01:20) MONT FG – Brandon Purty 32-yard field goal
  Montana 10–7; Drive: 11 plays, 61 yards, 4:02

Second quarter

- (09:34) MONT TD – Marcus Knight 4-yard rush, Brandon Purty kick
  Montana 17–7; Drive: 9 plays, 68 yards, 3:50
- (04:47) MONT TD – Mitch Roberts 15-yard pass from Dalton Sneed, Brandon Purty kick
  Montana 24–7; Drive: 6 plays, 82 yards, 2:19
- (02:05) SELA TD – Branson Schwebel 12-yard pass from Chason Virgil, Bryce Broussard kick
  Montana 24–14; Drive: 8 plays, 75 yards, 2:42
- (01:54) MONT TD – Malik Flowers 81-yard kickoff returned, Brandon Purty kick
  Montana 31–14; Drive: 0 plays, 0 yards, 0:00
- (01:17) SELA TD – Javon Conner 52-yard pass from Chason Virgil, Bryce Brousssard kick
  Montana 31–21; Drive: 5 plays, 75 yards, 0:37
- (00:08) MONT TD – Marcus Knight 7-yard pass from Dalton Sneed, Brandon Purty kick
  Montana 38–21; Drive: 7 plays, 71 yards, 1:03

Third quarter

- (14:03) MONT TD – Samori Toure 29-yard pass from Dalton Sneed, Brandon Purty kick
  Montana 45–21; Drive: 3 plays, 47 yards, 0:49
- (12:09) SELA TD – CJ Turner 18-yard pass from Chason Virgil, Bryce Broussard kick
  Montana 45–28; Drive: 5 plays, 75 yards, 1:54
- (07:00) MONT TD – Marcus Knight 7-yard rush, Brandon Purty kick
  Montana 51–28; Drive: 6 plays, 76 yards, 1:50
- (02:42) MONT TD – Marcus Knight 9-yard rush, Brandon Purty kick
  Montana 58–28; Drive: 10 plays, 53 yards, 3:21

Fourth quarter

- (13:11) MONT TD – Samori Toure 47-yard pass from Dalton Sneed, Brandon Purty kick
  Montana 65–28; Drive: 6 plays, 73 yards, 2:05
- (08:38) MONT SF – Team Safety
  Montana 67–28; Drive: 1 plays, -2 yards, 0:06
- (01:50) MONT TD – Corbin Walker 47-yard interception returned, Gabe Peppenger PAT failed
  Montana 73–28; Drive: 3 plays, 14 yards, 0:56

Top passers

- MONT – Dalton Sneed – 29/45, 459 yards, 5 TD
- SELA – Chason Virgil – 36/59, 436 yards, 4 TD, INT

Top rushers

- MONT – Marcus Knight – 16 carries, 75 yards, 3 TD
- SELA – Devonte Williams – 11 carries, 34 yards

Top receivers

- MONT – Samori Toure – 12 receptions, 303 yards, 3 TD
- SELA – Javon Conner – 9 receptions, 155 yards, 2 TD

Statistics	Southeastern Louisiana	Montana
First downs	23	30
Total yards	489	600
Rushing yards	22	123
Passing yards	467	477
Turnovers	1	0
Time of possession	30:44	29:16

== Rankings ==
Ranking movements Legend: ██ Increase in ranking ██ Decrease in ranking — = Not ranked RV = Received votes
	Week													
Poll	Pre	1	2	3	4	5	6	7	8	9	10	11	12	Final
STATS FCS	RV	23	23	21	19	17	23	RV	RV	RV	RV	23	21	19
Coaches	—	RV	24	23	22	19	25	—	—	—	RV	23	22	18
