= 2019 William & Mary Tribe football team =

American college football season

2019 William & Mary Tribe football
- Conference: Colonial Athletic Association
- Record: 5–7 (3–5 CAA)
- Head coach: Mike London (1st season)
- Offensive coordinator: Brennan Marion (1st season)
- Defensive coordinator: Vincent Brown (1st season)
- Captains: Nate Atkins; Bill Murray; Corey Parker; Mark Williamson
- Home stadium: Zable Stadium

2019 Colonial Athletic Association football standings
	Conf.			Overall
Team	W		L	W		L
No. 2 James Madison $^	8	–	0	14	–	2
No. 18 Albany ^	6	–	2	9	–	5
No. 15 Villanova ^	5	–	3	9	–	4
New Hampshire	5	–	3	6	–	5
Towson	4	–	4	7	–	5
Maine	4	–	4	6	–	6
Elon	4	–	4	5	–	6
Richmond	4	–	4	5	–	7
Delaware	3	–	5	5	–	7
William & Mary	3	–	5	5	–	7
Stony Brook	2	–	6	5	–	7
Rhode Island	0	–	8	2	–	10
$ – Conference champion; ^ – FCS playoff participant; Rankings from STATS Poll

The 2019 William & Mary Tribe football team represented the College of William & Mary as a member of the Colonial Athletic Association (CAA) in the 2019 NCAA Division I FCS football season. The Tribe, led by first-year head coach Mike London, played their home games at Zable Stadium. They finished the season 5–7 overall and 3–5 in CAA play to tie for ninth place.

== Preseason ==
=== CAA poll ===
In the CAA preseason poll released on July 23, 2019, the Tribe were predicted to finish in eleventh place.

=== Preseason All–CAA team ===
The Tribe had two players selected to the preseason all-CAA team.

Offense

Tyler Crist – FB

Defense

Isaiah Laster – S

== Schedule ==
Date	Time	Opponent	Site	TV	Result	Attendance
August 31	6:00 p.m.	Lafayette*	Zable Stadium; Williamsburg, VA	FloSports	W 30–17	10,176
September 6	8:00 p.m.	at Virginia*	Scott Stadium; Charlottesville, VA	ACCN	L 17–52	45,250
September 14	6:00 p.m.	Colgate*	Zable Stadium; Williamsburg, VA	FloSports	W 38–10	6,777
September 21	6:00 p.m.	at East Carolina*	Dowdy–Ficklen Stadium; Greenville, NC	ESPN3	L 7–19	38,004
September 29	3:30 p.m.	at Albany	Bob Ford Field; Albany, NY	FloSports	L 31–39	3,329
October 5	3:30 p.m.	No. 5 Villanova	Zable Stadium; Williamsburg, VA	FloSports	L 28–35	9,164
October 19	3:30 p.m.	No. 2 James Madison^{†}	Zable Stadium; Williamsburg, VA (rivalry)	FloSports	L 10–38	11,821
October 26	1:00 p.m.	at Maine	Alfond Stadium; Orono, ME	FloSports	L 25–34	8,123
November 2	2:00 p.m.	at Elon	Rhodes Stadium; Elon, NC	FloSports	W 31–29 ^{5OT}	9,216
November 9	1:00 p.m.	Rhode Island	Zable Stadium; Williamsburg, VA	FloSports	W 55–19	7,063
November 16	1:00 p.m.	No. 20 Towson	Zable Stadium; Williamsburg, VA	FloSports	L 10–31	6,738
November 23	12:00 p.m.	at Richmond	E. Claiborne Robins Stadium; Richmond, VA (Capital Cup)	FloSports	W 21–15 ^{OT}	7,020
*Non-conference game; ^{†}Homecoming; Rankings from STATS Poll released prior to the game; All times are in Eastern time

== Game summaries ==
=== Lafayette ===
	1	2	3	4	Total
Leopards	7	3	0	7	17
Tribe	6	0	24	0	30

=== At Virginia ===
	1	2	3	4	Total
Tribe	0	3	7	7	17
Cavaliers	21	14	7	10	52

=== Colgate ===
	1	2	3	4	Total
Raiders	0	7	3	0	10
Tribe	17	0	7	14	38

=== At East Carolina ===
	1	2	3	4	Total
Tribe	0	7	0	0	7
Pirates	7	3	3	6	19

=== At Albany ===
	1	2	3	4	Total
Tribe	14	3	7	7	31
Great Danes	3	9	10	17	39

=== Villanova ===
	1	2	3	4	Total
No. 5 Wildcats	14	7	0	14	35
Tribe	7	7	7	7	28

=== James Madison ===
	1	2	3	4	Total
No. 2 Dukes	7	14	10	7	38
Tribe	3	0	7	0	10

=== Maine ===
	1	2	3	4	Total
Tribe	6	6	0	13	25
Black Bears	0	21	10	3	34

=== At Elon ===
	1	2	3	4	OT	2OT	3OT	4OT	5OT	Total
Tribe	3	7	13	0	0	0	0	6	2	31
Phoenix	0	14	3	6	0	0	0	6	0	29

The five-overtime match-up against Elon marked the longest game in school history (the Tribe had never played in a game longer than two overtimes). This contest was also the first time a new NCAA football overtime rule was used (effected in 2019): starting with the fifth overtime period, each team will line up to attempt a two-point conversion instead of snapping the ball from the 25-yard-line. William & Mary converted their attempt while Elon did not.

=== Rhode Island ===
	1	2	3	4	Total
Rams	0	6	6	7	19
Tribe	21	14	7	13	55

=== Towson ===
	1	2	3	4	Total
No. 20 Tigers	14	10	7	0	31
Tribe	3	0	0	7	10

=== At Richmond ===
	1	2	3	4	OT	Total
Tribe	0	8	0	7	6	21
Spiders	0	10	2	3	0	15
