= 2019 Maine Black Bears football team =

American college football season

2019 Maine Black Bears football
- Conference: Colonial Athletic Association
- Record: 6–6 (4–4 CAA)
- Head coach: Nick Charlton (1st season)
- Offensive coordinator: Andrew Dresner (1st season)
- Defensive coordinator: Michael Ryan (1st season)
- Home stadium: Alfond Stadium

2019 Colonial Athletic Association football standings
	Conf.			Overall
Team	W		L	W		L
No. 2 James Madison $^	8	–	0	14	–	2
No. 18 Albany ^	6	–	2	9	–	5
No. 15 Villanova ^	5	–	3	9	–	4
New Hampshire	5	–	3	6	–	5
Towson	4	–	4	7	–	5
Maine	4	–	4	6	–	6
Elon	4	–	4	5	–	6
Richmond	4	–	4	5	–	7
Delaware	3	–	5	5	–	7
William & Mary	3	–	5	5	–	7
Stony Brook	2	–	6	5	–	7
Rhode Island	0	–	8	2	–	10
$ – Conference champion; ^ – FCS playoff participant; Rankings from STATS Poll

The 2019 Maine Black Bears football team represented the University of Maine in the 2019 NCAA Division I FCS football season. They played their home games at Alfond Stadium. They were a member of the Colonial Athletic Association. They were led by first-year head coach Nick Charlton. They finished the season 6–6, 4–4 in CAA play to finish in a four-way tie for fifth place.

== Preseason ==
=== CAA poll ===
In the CAA preseason poll released on July 23, 2019, the Black Bears were predicted to finish in third place.

=== Preseason All–CAA team ===
The Black Bears had six different players selected to the preseason all-CAA team.

Offense

Earnest Edwards – WR

Liam Dobson – OL

Defense

Kayon Whitaker – DL

Taji Lowe – LB

Deshawn Stevens – LB

Manny Patterson – CB

Special teams

Earnest Edwards – KR

== Schedule ==
Date	Time	Opponent	Rank	Site	TV	Result	Attendance
August 30	6:00 p.m.	Sacred Heart*	No. 7	Alfond Stadium; Orono, ME	FloSports	W 42–14	7,478
September 7	6:00 p.m.	at Georgia Southern*	No. 6	Paulson Stadium; Statesboro, GA	ESPN+	L 18–26	17,202
September 14	7:00 p.m.	No. 8 Towson	No. 7	Alfond Stadium; Orono, ME	FloSports	L 23–45	6,256
September 21	12:00 p.m.	at Colgate*	No. 12	Crown Field at Andy Kerr Stadium; Hamilton, NY	Stadium	W 35–21	5,606
September 28	3:30 p.m.	at No. 8 Villanova	No. 12	Villanova Stadium; Villanova, PA	FloSports	L 17–33	10,071
October 12	12:00 p.m.	Richmond	No. 18	Alfond Stadium; Orono, ME	FCS/WVII/WIPL	L 17–24	5,126
October 19	6:00 p.m.	at Liberty*		Williams Stadium; Lynchburg, VA	ESPN+	L 44–59	18,657
October 26	1:00 p.m.	William & Mary^{†}		Alfond Stadium; Orono, ME	FCS/WVII/WIPL	W 34–25	8,123
November 2	3:30 p.m.	at Albany		Bob Ford Field at Tom & Mary Casey Stadium; Albany, NY	FloSports	W 47–31	3,315
November 9	2:00 p.m.	at Elon		Rhodes Stadium; Elon, NC	FloSports	W 31–17	4,424
November 16	12:00 p.m.	Rhode Island		Alfond Stadium; Orono, ME	FCS/WVII/WIPL	W 34–30	4,908
November 23	1:00 p.m.	at New Hampshire		Wildcat Stadium; Durham, NH (Battle for the Brice-Cowell Musket)	FloSports	L 10–28	10,061
*Non-conference game; ^{†}Homecoming; Rankings from STATS Poll released prior to the game; All times are in Eastern time

== Game summaries ==
=== Sacred Heart ===
	1	2	3	4	Total
Pioneers	7	0	0	7	14
No. 7 Black Bears	21	21	0	0	42

=== At Georgia Southern ===
	1	2	3	4	Total
No. 6 Black Bears	3	0	0	15	18
Eagles	0	10	6	10	26

=== Towson ===
	1	2	3	4	Total
No. 8 Tigers	10	7	14	14	45
No. 7 Black Bears	6	7	3	7	23

=== At Colgate ===
	1	2	3	4	Total
No. 12 Black Bears	7	14	14	0	35
Raiders	0	7	7	7	21

=== At Villanova ===
	1	2	3	4	Total
No. 12 Black Bears	0	3	7	7	17
No. 8 Wildcats	16	14	0	3	33

=== Richmond ===
	1	2	3	4	Total
Spiders	0	7	14	3	24
No. 18 Black Bears	7	3	7	0	17

=== At Liberty ===
	1	2	3	4	Total
Black Bears	3	14	7	20	44
Flames	17	28	7	7	59

=== William & Mary ===
	1	2	3	4	Total
Tribe	6	6	0	13	25
Black Bears	0	21	10	3	34

=== At Albany ===
	1	2	3	4	Total
Black Bears	10	14	23	0	47
Great Danes	7	14	3	7	31

=== At Elon ===
	1	2	3	4	Total
Black Bears	28	0	0	3	31
Phoenix	0	3	7	7	17

=== Rhode Island ===
	1	2	3	4	Total
Rams	7	3	14	6	30
Black Bears	0	3	10	21	34

=== At New Hampshire ===
	1	2	3	4	Total
Black Bears	7	0	0	3	10
Wildcats	7	7	0	14	28

== Ranking movements ==
Ranking movements Legend: ██ Increase in ranking ██ Decrease in ranking — = Not ranked RV = Received votes т = Tied with team above or below
	Week													
Poll	Pre	1	2	3	4	5	6	7	8	9	10	11	12	Final
STATS FCS	7	6	7	12	12-T	20	18	RV						
Coaches	7	6	9	16	16	22	20	—						
