= 2019 Villanova Wildcats football team =

American college football season

2019 Villanova Wildcats football

FCS Playoffs First Round, L 44–45 vs. Southeastern Louisiana
- Conference: Colonial Athletic Association

Ranking
- STATS: No. 15
- FCS Coaches: No. 15
- Record: 9–4 (5–3 CAA)
- Head coach: Mark Ferrante (3rd season)
- Offensive coordinator: Chris Boden (1st season)
- Offensive scheme: Spread
- Defensive coordinator: Ola Adams (1st season)
- Base defense: 3–3–5
- Home stadium: Villanova Stadium

2019 Colonial Athletic Association football standings
	Conf.			Overall
Team	W		L	W		L
No. 2 James Madison $^	8	–	0	14	–	2
No. 18 Albany ^	6	–	2	9	–	5
No. 15 Villanova ^	5	–	3	9	–	4
New Hampshire	5	–	3	6	–	5
Towson	4	–	4	7	–	5
Maine	4	–	4	6	–	6
Elon	4	–	4	5	–	6
Richmond	4	–	4	5	–	7
Delaware	3	–	5	5	–	7
William & Mary	3	–	5	5	–	7
Stony Brook	2	–	6	5	–	7
Rhode Island	0	–	8	2	–	10
$ – Conference champion; ^ – FCS playoff participant; Rankings from STATS Poll

The 2019 Villanova Wildcats football team represented Villanova University in the 2019 NCAA Division I FCS football season. They were led by third-year head coach Mark Ferrante and played their home games at Villanova Stadium. They were a member of the Colonial Athletic Association. They finished the season 9–4, 5–3 in CAA play to finish in a tie for third place. They received an at-large bid to the FCS Playoffs where they lost in the first round to Southeastern Louisiana.

== Preseason ==
=== CAA poll ===
In the CAA preseason poll released on July 23, 2019, the Wildcats were predicted to finish in ninth place.

=== Preseason All–CAA team ===
The Wildcats did not have any players selected to the preseason all-CAA team.

== Schedule ==
Date	Time	Opponent	Rank	Site	TV	Result	Attendance
August 24	12:00 p.m.	at No. 13 Colgate*		Crown Field at Andy Kerr Stadium; Hamilton, NY	CBSSN	W 34–14	4,519
September 7	6:00 p.m.	Lehigh*	No. 24	Villanova Stadium; Villanova, PA	FloSports	W 38–10	8,319
September 14	6:00 p.m.	at Bucknell*	No. 22	Christy Mathewson-Memorial Stadium; Lewisburg, PA	Stadium	W 45–10	3,649
September 21	6:00 p.m.	at No. 5 Towson	No. 18	Johnny Unitas Stadium; Towson, MD	FloSports	W 52–45^{OT}	8,811
September 28	3:30 p.m.	No. 12 Maine	No. 8	Villanova Stadium; Villanova, PA	FloSports	W 33–17	10,071
October 5	3:30 p.m.	at William & Mary	No. 5	Zable Stadium; Williamsburg, VA	FloSports	W 35–28	9,164
October 12	1:30 p.m.	at No. 2 James Madison	No. 5	Bridgeforth Stadium; Harrisonburg, VA	FloSports	L 24–38	25,076
October 26	3:30 p.m.	Stony Brook	No. 5	Villanova Stadium; Villanova, PA	FloSports	L 35–36	7,720
November 2	1:00 p.m.	at New Hampshire	No. 11	Wildcat Stadium; Durham, NH	FloSports	L 20–28	7,895
November 9	1:00 p.m.	Richmond	No. 18	Villanova Stadium; Villanova, PA	FloSports	W 35–28	4,151
November 15	7:00 p.m.	LIU*	No. 13	Villanova Stadium; Villanova, PA	FloSport	W 35–7	3,051
November 23	1:00 p.m.	Delaware	No. 10	Villanova Stadium; Villanova, PA (Battle of the Blue)	FloSports	W 55–33	5,319
November 30	3:00 p.m.	at Southeastern Louisiana*	No. 8	Strawberry Stadium; Hammond, LA (NCAA Division I First Round)	ESPN3	L 44–45	4,173
*Non-conference game; Rankings from STATS Poll released prior to the game; All times are in Eastern time

== Game summaries ==
=== At Colgate ===
	1	2	3	4	Total
Wildcats	0	27	0	7	34
No. 13 Raiders	0	0	7	7	14

Scoring summary

Quarter	Time	Drive			Team	Scoring information	Score	
Quarter	Time	Plays	Yards	TOP	Team	Scoring information	NOVA	COLG
2	14:20	6	62	1:51	NOVA	Jalen Jackson 18-yard touchdown reception from Daniel Smith, Drew Kresge kick good	7	0
2	13:16				NOVA	Interception returned 27 yards for touchdown by Jaquan Amos, Drew Kresge kick good	14	0
2	2:07	8	91	4:26	NOVA	Changa Hodge 45-yard touchdown reception from Daniel Smith, Drew Kresge kick missed	20	0
2	0:12	6	61	0:43	NOVA	Andrew Perez 15-yard touchdown reception from Daniel Smith, Drew Kresge kick good	27	0
3	6:27	12	68	5:41	COLG	Nick Draught 10-yard touchdown reception from Grant Breneman, Chris Puzzi kick good	27	7
4	13:26	8	77	3:05	COLG	Grant Breneman 1-yard touchdown run, Chris Puzzi kick good	27	14
4	8:41	10	78	4:40	NOVA	Daniel Smith 9-yard touchdown run, Drew Kresge kick good	34	14
"TOP" = time of possession. For other American football terms, see Glossary of American football.							34	14

=== Lehigh ===
	1	2	3	4	Total
Mountain Hawks	0	3	7	0	10
No. 24 Wildcats	0	17	14	7	38

=== At Bucknell ===
	1	2	3	4	Total
No. 22 Wildcats	14	14	14	3	45
Bison	0	0	3	7	10

=== At Towson ===
	1	2	3	4	OT	Total
No. 18 Wildcats	14	7	14	10	7	52
No. 5 Tigers	7	21	0	17	0	45

=== Maine ===
	1	2	3	4	Total
No. 12 Black Bears	0	3	7	7	17
No. 8 Wildcats	16	14	0	3	33

=== At William & Mary ===
	1	2	3	4	Total
No. 5 Wildcats	14	7	0	14	35
Tribe	7	7	7	7	28

=== At James Madison ===
	1	2	3	4	Total
No. 5 Wildcats	0	10	14	0	24
No. 2 Dukes	7	10	0	21	38

=== Stony Brook ===
	1	2	3	4	Total
Seawolves	7	3	10	16	36
No. 5 Wildcats	7	21	0	7	35

=== At New Hampshire ===
	1	2	3	4	Total
No. 11 Nova Wildcats	7	13	0	0	20
UNH Wildcats	7	0	14	7	28

=== Richmond ===
	1	2	3	4	Total
Spiders	14	14	0	0	28
No. 18 Wildcats	14	7	0	14	35

=== LIU ===
	1	2	3	4	Total
Sharks	0	7	0	0	7
No. 13 Wildcats	14	14	7	0	35

=== Delaware ===
	1	2	3	4	Total
Fightin' Blue Hens	7	10	0	16	33
No. 10 Wildcats	20	14	14	7	55

== FCS Playoffs ==
The Wildcats were selected for the postseason tournament, with a first-round pairing against Southeastern Louisiana.

=== At Southeastern Louisiana–First Round ===
	1	2	3	4	Total
No. 8 Wildcats	10	21	0	13	44
Lions	7	7	17	14	45

== Ranking movements ==
Ranking movements Legend: ██ Increase in ranking ██ Decrease in ranking — = Not ranked RV = Received votes
	Week														
Poll	Pre	1	2	3	4	5	6	7	8	9	10	11	12	13	Final
STATS FCS	RV	24	22	18	8	5	5	7	5	11	18	13	10	8	15
Coaches	—	RV	23	18	13	8	7	7	6	11	19	16	14	10	15
