= 2019 James Madison Dukes football team =

American college football season

2019 James Madison Dukes football

CAA champion Lambert Cup winner

NCAA Division I Championship Game, L 20–28 vs. North Dakota State
- Conference: CAA Football

Ranking
- STATS: No. 2
- FCS Coaches: No. 2
- Record: 14–2 (8–0 CAA)
- Head coach: Curt Cignetti (1st season)
- Offensive coordinator: Shane Montgomery (1st season)
- Offensive scheme: Spread
- Defensive coordinator: Corey Hetherman (1st season)
- Base defense: 4–3
- Home stadium: Bridgeforth Stadium

2019 Colonial Athletic Association football standings
	Conf.			Overall
Team	W		L	W		L
No. 2 James Madison $^	8	–	0	14	–	2
No. 18 Albany ^	6	–	2	9	–	5
No. 15 Villanova ^	5	–	3	9	–	4
New Hampshire	5	–	3	6	–	5
Towson	4	–	4	7	–	5
Maine	4	–	4	6	–	6
Elon	4	–	4	5	–	6
Richmond	4	–	4	5	–	7
Delaware	3	–	5	5	–	7
William & Mary	3	–	5	5	–	7
Stony Brook	2	–	6	5	–	7
Rhode Island	0	–	8	2	–	10
$ – Conference champion; ^ – FCS playoff participant; Rankings from STATS Poll

The 2019 James Madison Dukes football team represented James Madison University during the 2019 NCAA Division I FCS football season. They were led by first-year head coach Curt Cignetti and played their home games at Bridgeforth Stadium. They competed as a member of CAA Football. (Note: CAA Football is operated by the multi-sports Colonial Athletic Association but is a separate legal entity.) They finished the season 14–2, 8–0 in CAA play to be CAA champions. They received the CAA's automatic bid to the FCS Playoffs where they defeated Monmouth, Northern Iowa, and Weber State to advance to the FCS National Championship Game where they lost to North Dakota State.

== Preseason ==
=== CAA poll ===
In the CAA preseason poll released on July 23, 2019, the Dukes were predicted to finish in first place.

=== Preseason All–CAA team ===
The Dukes had six players selected to the preseason all-CAA team.

Offense

Liam Fornadel – OL

Defense

Ron'Dell Carter – DL

Dimitri Holloway – LB

Adam Smith – S

Rashad Robinson – CB

Special teams

D'Angelo Amos – PR

== Schedule ==
Date	Time	Opponent	Rank	Site	TV	Result	Attendance
August 31	2:00 p.m.	at West Virginia*	No. 2	Mountaineer Field; Morgantown, WV	AT&TSN Pitt	L 13–20	61,891
September 7	6:00 p.m.	Saint Francis (PA)*	No. 2	Bridgeforth Stadium; Harrisonburg, VA	NBCS WA	W 44–7	22,422
September 14	3:30 p.m.	Morgan State*	No. 2	Bridgeforth Stadium; Harrisonburg, VA	NBCS WA	W 63–12	19,777
September 21	4:00 p.m.	at Chattanooga*	No. 2	Finley Stadium; Chattanooga, TN	ESPN+	W 37–14	8,795
September 28	2:00 p.m.	at No. 24 Elon	No. 2	Rhodes Stadium; Elon, NC	FloSports	W 45–10	11,926
October 5	6:00 p.m.	at No. 24 Stony Brook	No. 2	Kenneth P. LaValle Stadium; Stony Brook, NY	FloSports/SNY	W 45–38 ^{OT}	12,812
October 12	1:30 p.m.	No. 5 Villanova	No. 2	Bridgeforth Stadium; Harrisonburg, VA	MASN	W 38–24	25,076
October 19	3:30 p.m.	at William & Mary	No. 2	Zable Stadium; Williamsburg, VA (rivalry)	FloSports	W 38–10	11,821
October 26	3:30 p.m.	No. 16 Towson^{†}	No. 2	Bridgeforth Stadium; Harrisonburg, VA	MASN/SNY	W 27–10	23,983
November 9	3:30 p.m.	No. 23 New Hampshire	No. 2	Bridgeforth Stadium; Harrisonburg, VA	MASN/SNY	W 54–16	19,660
November 16	3:30 p.m.	Richmond	No. 2	Bridgeforth Stadium; Harrisonburg, VA (rivalry)	MASN/SNY	W 48–6	21,947
November 23	12:00 p.m.	at Rhode Island	No. 2	Meade Stadium; Kingston, RI	FloSports	W 55–21	2,815
December 7	1:00 p.m.	No. 14 Monmouth*	No. 2	Bridgeforth Stadium; Harrisonburg, VA (NCAA Division I Second Round)	ESPN3	W 66–21	10,881
December 13	7:00 p.m.	No. 6 Northern Iowa*	No. 2	Bridgeforth Stadium; Harrisonburg, VA (NCAA Division I Quarterfinal)	ESPN2	W 17–0	8,741
December 21	6:30 p.m.	No. 4 Weber State*	No. 2	Bridgeforth Stadium; Harrisonburg, VA (NCAA Division I Semifinal)	ESPNU	W 30–14	10,487
January 11	12:00 p.m.	No. 1 North Dakota State*	No. 2	Toyota Stadium; Frisco, TX (NCAA Division I Championship Game)	ABC	L 20–28	17,866
*Non-conference game; ^{†}Homecoming; Rankings from STATS Poll released prior to the game; All times are in Eastern time

== Game summaries ==
=== At West Virginia ===
	1	2	3	4	Total
No. 2 Dukes	7	0	3	3	13
Mountaineers	0	3	7	10	20

=== Saint Francis (PA) ===
	1	2	3	4	Total
Red Flash	0	0	0	7	7
No. 2 Dukes	14	13	10	7	44

=== Morgan State ===
	1	2	3	4	Total
Bears	0	3	0	9	12
No. 2 Dukes	7	21	0	35	63

=== At Chattanooga ===
	1	2	3	4	Total
No. 2 Dukes	14	6	10	7	37
Mocs	14	0	0	0	14

=== At Elon ===
	1	2	3	4	Total
No. 2 Dukes	14	7	17	7	45
No. 24 Phoenix	7	0	0	3	10

=== At Stony Brook ===
	1	2	3	4	OT	Total
No. 2 Dukes	14	14	3	7	7	45
No. 24 Seawolves	14	7	7	10	0	38

=== Villanova ===
	1	2	3	4	Total
No. 5 Wildcats	0	10	14	0	24
No. 2 Dukes	7	10	0	21	38

=== At William & Mary ===
	1	2	3	4	Total
No. 2 Dukes	7	14	10	7	38
Tribe	3	0	7	0	10

=== Towson ===
	1	2	3	4	Total
No. 16 Tigers	0	10	0	0	10
No. 2 Dukes	7	17	3	0	27

=== New Hampshire ===
	1	2	3	4	Total
No. 23 Wildcats	10	0	6	0	16
No. 2 Dukes	10	20	14	10	54

=== Richmond ===
	1	2	3	4	Total
Spiders	0	6	0	0	6
No. 2 Dukes	10	14	14	10	48

=== At Rhode Island ===
	1	2	3	4	Total
No. 2 Dukes	10	21	7	17	55
Rams	0	0	14	7	21

== FCS Playoffs ==
The Dukes entered the postseason tournament as the number two seed, with a first-round bye.

=== Monmouth–Second Round ===
	1	2	3	4	Total
No. 14 Hawks	14	7	0	0	21
No. 2 Dukes	21	17	14	14	66

=== Northern Iowa–Quarterfinals ===
	1	2	3	4	Total
No. 6 Panthers	0	0	0	0	0
No. 2 Dukes	7	3	0	7	17

=== Weber State–Semifinals ===
	1	2	3	4	Total
No. 4 Wildcats	0	7	0	7	14
No. 2 Dukes	10	14	3	3	30

=== Vs. North Dakota State–Championship ===
	1	2	3	4	Total
No. 2 Dukes	7	3	3	7	20
No. 1 Bison	7	14	0	7	28

== Ranking movements ==
Ranking movements Legend: ( ) = First-place votes
	Week														
Poll	Pre	1	2	3	4	5	6	7	8	9	10	11	12	13	Final
STATS FCS	2 (14)	2 (11)	2 (9)	2 (8)	2 (4)	2 (7)	2 (1)	2 (2)	2 (3)	2 (1)	2 (1)	2	2	2	2
Coaches	2 (1)	2 (1)	2	2	2	2	2	2	2	2	2	2	2	2	2

== Players drafted into the NFL ==
Round	Pick	Player	Position	NFL club
7	231	Ben DiNucci	QB	Dallas Cowboys
