= 2019 Albany Great Danes football team =

American college football season

2019 Albany Great Danes football

NCAA Division I Second Round, L 21–47 vs. Montana State
- Conference: Colonial Athletic Association

Ranking
- STATS: No. 18
- FCS Coaches: No. 20
- Record: 9–5 (6–2 CAA)
- Head coach: Greg Gattuso (6th season)
- Offensive coordinator: Joe Davis (2nd season)
- Co-defensive coordinators: Joe Bernard (2nd season); Keith Dudzinski (2nd season)
- Home stadium: Bob Ford Field at Tom & Mary Casey Stadium

2019 Colonial Athletic Association football standings
	Conf.			Overall
Team	W		L	W		L
No. 2 James Madison $^	8	–	0	14	–	2
No. 18 Albany ^	6	–	2	9	–	5
No. 15 Villanova ^	5	–	3	9	–	4
New Hampshire	5	–	3	6	–	5
Towson	4	–	4	7	–	5
Maine	4	–	4	6	–	6
Elon	4	–	4	5	–	6
Richmond	4	–	4	5	–	7
Delaware	3	–	5	5	–	7
William & Mary	3	–	5	5	–	7
Stony Brook	2	–	6	5	–	7
Rhode Island	0	–	8	2	–	10
$ – Conference champion; ^ – FCS playoff participant; Rankings from STATS Poll

The 2019 Albany Great Danes football team represented the University at Albany, SUNY as a member of the Colonial Athletic Association (CAA) during the 2019 NCAA Division I FCS football season. Led by sixth-year head coach Greg Gattuso, the Great Danes compiled an overall record of 9–5 with a mark of 6–2 in conference play, placing second in the CAA. Albany received an at-large bid to the NCAA Division I FCS Football Championship, where the Great Danes defeated Central Connecticut in the first round before losing to Montana State in the second round. The team played home games at Bob Ford Field at Tom & Mary Casey Stadium in Albany, New York.

== Preseason ==
=== CAA poll ===
In the CAA preseason poll released on July 23, 2019, the Great Danes were predicted to finish in twelfth place.

=== Preseason All–CAA team ===
The Great Danes did not have any players selected to the preseason all-CAA team.

== Schedule ==
Date	Time	Opponent	Rank	Site	TV	Result	Attendance
August 29	7:00 p.m.	at Central Michigan*		Kelly/Shorts Stadium; Mount Pleasant, MI	ESPN3	L 21–38	12,207
September 7	7:00 p.m.	Bryant*		Bob Ford Field at Tom & Mary Casey Stadium; Albany, NY	FloSports	W 45–3	5,014
September 14	1:00 p.m.	at Monmouth*		Kessler Field; West Long Branch, NJ	ESPN+	L 35–38	2,329
September 21	3:30 p.m.	Lafayette*		Bob Ford Field at Tom & Mary Casey Stadium; Albany, NY	FloSports	W 36–7	3,241
September 28	3:30 p.m.	at William & Mary		Zable Stadium; Williamsburg, VA	FloSports	W 39–31	3,329
October 5	2:00 p.m.	at Richmond		E. Claiborne Robins Stadium; Richmond, VA	FloSports	L 20–23	8,061
October 12	4:00 p.m.	at No. 9 Towson		Johnny Unitas Stadium; Towson, MD	FloSports	W 38–21	4,809
October 19	3:30 p.m.	Rhode Island		Bob Ford Field at Tom & Mary Casey Stadium; Albany, NY	FloSports	W 35–28	7,763
November 2	3:30 p.m.	Maine		Bob Ford Field at Tom & Mary Casey Stadium; Albany, NY	FloSports	L 31–47	3,315
November 9	1:00 p.m.	at Delaware		Delaware Stadium; Newark, DE	FloSports	W 21–17	13,472
November 16	1:00 p.m.	New Hampshire		Bob Ford Field at Tom & Mary Casey Stadium; Albany, NY	FloSports	W 24–17	2,486
November 23	2:00 p.m.	at Stony Brook		Kenneth P. Lavalle Stadium; Stony Brook, NY (rivalry)	FloSports	W 31–26	6,171
November 30	1:00 p.m.	No. 17 Central Connecticut*	No. 25	Bob Ford Field at Tom & Mary Casey Stadium; Albany, NY (NCAA Division I First Round)	ESPN3	W 42–14	1,660
December 7	3:00 p.m.	at No. 5 Montana State*	No. 25	Bobcat Stadium; Bozeman, MT (NCAA Division I Second Round)	ESPN3	L 21–47	12,947
*Non-conference game; Rankings from STATS Poll released prior to the game; All times are in Eastern time

== Game summaries ==
=== At Central Michigan ===
	1	2	3	4	Total
Great Danes	0	7	7	7	21
Chippewas	7	17	7	7	38

=== Bryant ===
	1	2	3	4	Total
Bulldogs	0	0	0	3	3
Great Danes	7	21	7	10	45

=== At Monmouth ===
	1	2	3	4	OT	Total
Great Danes	0	14	7	14	0	35
Hawks	7	14	7	7	3	38

=== Lafayette ===
	1	2	3	4	Total
Leopards	0	0	0	7	7
Great Danes	12	10	0	14	36

=== William & Mary ===
	1	2	3	4	Total
Tribe	14	3	7	7	31
Great Danes	3	9	10	17	39

=== At Richmond ===
	1	2	3	4	Total
Great Danes	7	6	0	7	20
Spiders	10	13	0	0	23

=== At Towson ===
	1	2	3	4	Total
Great Danes	7	10	14	7	38
No. 9 Tigers	7	7	7	0	21

=== Rhode Island ===
	1	2	3	4	Total
Rams	7	7	7	7	28
Great Danes	0	6	22	7	35

=== Maine ===
	1	2	3	4	Total
Black Bears	10	14	23	0	47
Great Danes	7	14	3	7	31

=== At Delaware ===
	1	2	3	4	Total
Great Danes	7	7	0	7	21
Fightin' Blue Hens	0	17	0	0	17

=== New Hampshire ===
	1	2	3	4	Total
Wildcats	7	7	0	3	17
Great Danes	7	10	0	7	24

=== At Stony Brook ===
	1	2	3	4	Total
Great Danes	21	3	0	7	31
Seawolves	0	14	0	12	26

== FCS Playoffs ==
The Great Danes were selected for the postseason tournament, with a first-round pairing against Central Connecticut.

=== Central Connecticut–First Round ===
	1	2	3	4	Total
No. 17 Blue Devils	7	0	0	7	14
No. 25 Great Danes	0	7	28	7	42

=== At Montana State–Second Round ===
	1	2	3	4	Total
No. 25 Great Danes	7	0	0	14	21
No. 5 Bobcats	16	10	14	7	47
