= 2019 Delaware Fightin' Blue Hens football team =

American college football season

2019 Delaware Fightin' Blue Hens football
- Conference: Colonial Athletic Association
- Record: 5–7 (3–5 CAA)
- Head coach: Danny Rocco (3rd season)
- Offensive coordinator: Jared Ambrose (1st season)
- Offensive scheme: Spread
- Defensive coordinator: Chris Cosh (3rd season)
- Base defense: 4–3
- Home stadium: Delaware Stadium

2019 Colonial Athletic Association football standings
	Conf.			Overall
Team	W		L	W		L
No. 2 James Madison $^	8	–	0	14	–	2
No. 18 Albany ^	6	–	2	9	–	5
No. 15 Villanova ^	5	–	3	9	–	4
New Hampshire	5	–	3	6	–	5
Towson	4	–	4	7	–	5
Maine	4	–	4	6	–	6
Elon	4	–	4	5	–	6
Richmond	4	–	4	5	–	7
Delaware	3	–	5	5	–	7
William & Mary	3	–	5	5	–	7
Stony Brook	2	–	6	5	–	7
Rhode Island	0	–	8	2	–	10
$ – Conference champion; ^ – FCS playoff participant; Rankings from STATS Poll

The 2019 Delaware Fightin' Blue Hens football team represented the University of Delaware as a member of the Colonial Athletic Association (CAA) during the 2019 NCAA Division I FCS football season. Led by third-year head coach Danny Rocco, the Fightin' Blue Hens compiled an overall record of 5–7 with a mark of 3–5 in conference play, tying for ninth place in the CAA. The team played home games at Delaware Stadium in Newark, Delaware. The stadium underwent renovations prior to the 2019 season.

== Preseason ==
=== CAA poll ===
In the CAA preseason poll released on July 23, 2019, the Fightin' Blue Hens were predicted to finish in fifth place.

=== Preseason All–CAA team ===
The Fightin' Blue Hens had two players selected to the preseason all-CAA team.

Offense

Mario Farinella – OL

Special teams

Nick Pritchard – P

== Schedule ==
Delaware scheduled 12 games in the 2019 season instead of the 11 normally allowed for FCS programs. Under a standard provision of NCAA rules, all FCS teams are allowed to schedule 12 regular-season games in years in which the period starting with Labor Day weekend and ending with the last Saturday of November contains 14 Saturdays.

Date	Time	Opponent	Rank	Site	TV	Result	Attendance
August 29	7:00 p.m.	Delaware State*	No. 22	Delaware Stadium; Newark, DE (Route 1 Rivalry)	FloSports	W 31–13	15,894
September 7	7:00 p.m.	at Rhode Island	No. 21	Meade Stadium; Kingston, RI	FloSports	W 44–36 ^{3OT}	8,511
September 14	1:00 p.m.	No. 1 North Dakota State*	No. 18	Delaware Stadium; Newark, DE	NBCSP	L 22–47	14,489
September 21	1:00 p.m.	Penn*	No. 20	Delaware Stadium; Newark, DE	YouTube	W 28–27	11,782
September 28	12:30 p.m.	at Pittsburgh*	No. 20	Heinz Field; Pittsburgh, PA	ACCRSN	L 14–17	68,400
October 12	2:00 p.m.	at Elon	No. 15	Rhodes Stadium; Elon, NC	FloSports	L 7–42	5,572
October 19	1:00 p.m.	No. 22 New Hampshire	No. 24	Delaware Stadium; Newark, DE	FloSports	W 16–10	16,730
October 26	1:00 p.m.	Richmond^{†}	No. 19	Delaware Stadium; Newark, DE	FloSports	L 25–35	15,308
November 2	2:00 p.m.	at No. 21 Towson		Johnny Unitas Stadium; Towson, MD	FloSports	L 24–31	5,522
November 9	1:00 p.m.	Albany		Delaware Stadium; Newark, DE	FloSports	L 17–21	13,742
November 16	1:00 p.m.	Stony Brook		Delaware Stadium; Newark, DE	FloSports	W 17–10	11,981
November 23	1:00 p.m.	at No. 10 Villanova		Villanova Stadium; Villanova, PA (Battle of the Blue)	FloSports	L 33–55	5,319
*Non-conference game; ^{†}Homecoming; Rankings from STATS Poll released prior to the game; All times are in Eastern time

== Coaching staff ==
Name	Position	Year	Alma mater
Danny Rocco	Head coach	3rd	Wake Forest (1984)
Jared Ambrose	Offensive coordinator	3rd	Shepherd (2007)
Chris Cosh	Defensive coordinator/defensive backs	3rd	Virginia Tech (1984)
Bill Cubit	Assistant head coach/running backs	1st	Delaware (1973)
Levern Belin	Defensive line coach	3rd	Wake Forest (1991)
Holman Copeland	Assistant coach - Corners	1st	
Jalen Kindle	Assistant coach	2nd	Delaware (2017)
Dave Legg	Assistant coach – Outside linebackers/special teams	1st	
Gregory Meyer	Tight ends coach	2nd	Buffalo State (2009)
Bill Polin	Offensive line coach/recruiting coordinator	3rd	Colby (2000)
Clint Sintim	Outside linebackers coach	3rd	Virginia (2009)
Alex Wood	Wide receivers coach	2nd	Iowa (1978)
Tony Palmieri	Video coordinator	3rd	North Florida (2009)
Carl Kotz	Director of football operations	3rd	Clemson (2003)
Chris Stewart	Strength and conditioning	3rd	Western Carolina (1998)
Felicia Bergman	Director of Football Advising	3rd	Colorado State (2009)
Jude Moser	Administrative Assistant	10th	University of Delaware (1984)

== Game summaries ==
=== Delaware State ===
	1	2	3	4	Total
Hornets	3	3	0	7	13
No. 22 Fightin' Blue Hens	3	13	9	6	31

=== At Rhode Island ===
	1	2	3	4	OT	2OT	3OT	Total
No. 21 Fightin' Blue Hens	0	0	14	8	7	7	8	44
Rams	3	10	0	9	7	7	0	36

=== North Dakota State ===
	1	2	3	4	Total
No. 1 Bison	10	17	6	14	47
No. 18 Fightin' Blue Hens	5	0	3	14	22

=== Penn ===
	1	2	3	4	Total
Quakers	7	7	7	6	27
No. 20 Fightin' Blue Hens	7	0	14	7	28

=== At Pittsburgh ===
	1	2	3	4	Total
No. 20 Fightin' Blue Hens	0	7	7	0	14
Panthers	0	10	0	7	17

=== At Elon ===
	1	2	3	4	Total
No. 15 Fightin' Blue Hens	0	0	0	7	7
Phoenix	7	0	21	14	42

=== New Hampshire ===
	1	2	3	4	Total
No. 22 Wildcats	0	10	0	0	10
No. 24 Fightin' Blue Hens	0	10	3	3	16

=== Richmond ===
	1	2	3	4	Total
Spiders	21	7	7	0	35
No. 19 Fightin' Blue Hens	7	3	15	0	25

=== At Towson ===
	1	2	3	4	Total
Fightin' Blue Hens	7	7	7	3	24
No. 21 Tigers	7	17	0	7	31

=== Albany ===
	1	2	3	4	Total
Great Danes	7	7	0	7	21
Fightin' Blue Hens	0	17	0	0	17

=== Stony Brook ===
	1	2	3	4	Total
Seawolves	0	10	0	0	10
Fightin' Blue Hens	7	3	0	7	17

=== At Villanova ===
	1	2	3	4	Total
Fightin' Blue Hens	7	10	0	16	33
No. 10 Wildcats	20	14	14	7	55

== Ranking movements ==
Ranking movements Legend: ██ Increase in ranking ██ Decrease in ranking RV = Received votes
	Week														
Poll	Pre	1	2	3	4	5	6	7	8	9	10	11	12	13	Final
STATS FCS	22	21	18	20	20	19	15	24	19	RV					
Coaches	23	21	18	20	19	18	15	24	19	RV					
