= 2019 New Hampshire Wildcats football team =

American college football season

2019 New Hampshire Wildcats football
- Conference: Colonial Athletic Association
- Record: 6–5 (5–3 CAA)
- Head coach: Ricky Santos (interim, 1st season)
- Defensive coordinator: John Lyons (8th season)
- Home stadium: Wildcat Stadium

2019 Colonial Athletic Association football standings
	Conf.			Overall
Team	W		L	W		L
No. 2 James Madison $^	8	–	0	14	–	2
No. 18 Albany ^	6	–	2	9	–	5
No. 15 Villanova ^	5	–	3	9	–	4
New Hampshire	5	–	3	6	–	5
Towson	4	–	4	7	–	5
Maine	4	–	4	6	–	6
Elon	4	–	4	5	–	6
Richmond	4	–	4	5	–	7
Delaware	3	–	5	5	–	7
William & Mary	3	–	5	5	–	7
Stony Brook	2	–	6	5	–	7
Rhode Island	0	–	8	2	–	10
$ – Conference champion; ^ – FCS playoff participant; Rankings from STATS Poll

The 2019 New Hampshire Wildcats football team represented the University of New Hampshire as a member of the Colonial Athletic Association (CAA) in the 2019 NCAA Division I FCS football season. They were led by interim head coach Ricky Santos, due to longtime head coach Sean McDonnell taking a leave of absence for medical reasons. The team played their home games at Wildcat Stadium. The Wildcats finished the season 6–5 overall and 5–3 in CAA play to tie for third place.

== Preseason ==
=== CAA poll ===
In the CAA preseason poll released on July 23, 2019, the Wildcats were predicted to finish in seventh place.

=== Preseason All–CAA team ===
The Wildcats had one player selected to the preseason all-CAA team.

Defense

Pop Lacey – S

== Schedule ==
Date	Time	Opponent	Rank	Site	TV	Result	Attendance	Source
September 7	1:00 p.m.	at Holy Cross*		Fitton Field; Worcester, MA	Stadium	L 10–13	8,372	
September 14	7:00 p.m.	at FIU*		Riccardo Silva Stadium; Miami, FL	ESPN3	L 17–30	11,756	
September 21	6:00 p.m.	Rhode Island		Wildcat Stadium; Durham, NH	NECN	W 27–24	7,519	
September 28	6:00 p.m.	Duquesne*		Wildcat Stadium; Durham, NH	NBCSB	W 23–6	7,920	
October 5	3:30 p.m.	Elon^{†}		Wildcat Stadium; Durham, NH	NBCSB	W 26–10	17,132	
October 12	6:00 p.m.	at No. 22 Stony Brook		Kenneth P. LaValle Stadium; Stony Brook, NY	FloSports	W 20–14	5,599	
October 19	1:00 p.m.	at No. 24 Delaware	No. 22	Delaware Stadium; Newark, DE	FloSports	L 10–16	16,730	
November 2	1:00 p.m.	No. 11 Villanova		Wildcat Stadium; Durham, NH	NBCSB	W 28–20	7,895	
November 9	3:30 p.m.	at No. 2 James Madison	No. 23	Bridgeforth Stadium; Harrisonburg, VA	FloSports	L 16–54	19,660	
November 16	1:00 p.m.	at Albany		Bob Ford Field at Tom & Mary Casey Stadium; Albany, NY	FloSports	L 17–24	2,486	
November 23	1:00 p.m.	Maine		Wildcat Stadium; Durham, NH (Battle for the Brice–Cowell Musket)	NBCSB	W 28–10	10,061	
*Non-conference game; ^{†}Homecoming; Rankings from STATS Poll released prior to the game; All times are in Eastern time

== Game summaries ==
=== At Holy Cross ===
	1	2	3	4	Total
Wildcats	0	0	3	7	10
Crusaders	0	3	0	10	13

=== At FIU ===
	1	2	3	4	Total
Wildcats	10	0	7	0	17
Panthers	7	6	7	10	30

=== Rhode Island ===
	1	2	3	4	Total
Rams	0	7	3	14	24
Wildcats	7	7	7	6	27

=== Duquesne ===
	1	2	3	4	Total
Dukes	0	0	0	6	6
Wildcats	10	3	3	7	23

=== Elon ===
	1	2	3	4	Total
Phoenix	3	7	0	0	10
Wildcats	13	7	0	6	26

=== At Stony Brook ===
	1	2	3	4	Total
Wildcats	7	0	3	10	20
No. 22 Seawolves	0	7	7	0	14

=== At Delaware ===
	1	2	3	4	Total
No. 22 Wildcats	0	10	0	0	10
No. 24 Fightin' Blue Hens	0	10	3	3	16

=== Villanova ===
	1	2	3	4	Total
No. 11 Nova Wildcats	7	13	0	0	20
UNH Wildcats	7	0	14	7	28

=== At James Madison ===
	1	2	3	4	Total
No. 23 Wildcats	10	0	6	0	16
No. 2 Dukes	10	20	14	10	54

=== At Albany ===
	1	2	3	4	Total
Wildcats	7	7	0	3	17
Great Danes	7	10	0	7	24

=== Maine ===
	1	2	3	4	Total
Black Bears	7	0	0	3	10
Wildcats	7	7	0	14	28

== Ranking movements ==
Ranking movements Legend: ██ Increase in ranking ██ Decrease in ranking RV = Received votes
	Week													
Poll	Pre	1	2	3	4	5	6	7	8	9	10	11	12	Final
STATS FCS	RV							22			23	RV		RV
Coaches	RV							23			25	RV		
