= 2019 Elon Phoenix football team =

American college football season

2019 Elon Phoenix football
- Conference: Colonial Athletic Association
- Record: 5–6 (4–4 CAA)
- Head coach: Tony Trisciani (1st season)
- Offensive coordinator: Drew Folmar (3rd season)
- Defensive coordinator: Billy Crocker (1st season)
- Home stadium: Rhodes Stadium

2019 Colonial Athletic Association football standings
	Conf.			Overall
Team	W		L	W		L
No. 2 James Madison $^	8	–	0	14	–	2
No. 18 Albany ^	6	–	2	9	–	5
No. 15 Villanova ^	5	–	3	9	–	4
New Hampshire	5	–	3	6	–	5
Towson	4	–	4	7	–	5
Maine	4	–	4	6	–	6
Elon	4	–	4	5	–	6
Richmond	4	–	4	5	–	7
Delaware	3	–	5	5	–	7
William & Mary	3	–	5	5	–	7
Stony Brook	2	–	6	5	–	7
Rhode Island	0	–	8	2	–	10
$ – Conference champion; ^ – FCS playoff participant; Rankings from STATS Poll

The 2019 Elon Phoenix football team represented Elon University in the 2019 NCAA Division I FCS football season. They were led by first-year head coach Tony Trisciani and played their home games at Rhodes Stadium. They were members of the Colonial Athletic Association (CAA). They finished the season 5–6, 4–4 in CAA play to finish in a four-way tie for fifth place.

== Preseason ==
=== CAA poll ===
In the CAA preseason poll released on July 23, 2019, the Phoenix were predicted to finish in fourth place.

=== Preseason All–CAA team ===
The Phoenix had two players selected to the preseason all-CAA team.

Offense

Jaylan Thomas – RB

Matt Foster – TE

== Schedule ==
Date	Time	Opponent	Rank	Site	TV	Result	Attendance
August 31	6:00 p.m.	at No. 20 North Carolina A&T*	No. 21	BB&T Stadium; Greensboro, NC	ESPN3	L 21–24	16,358
September 7	2:00 p.m.	The Citadel*		Rhodes Stadium; Elon, NC	FloSports	W 35–28	5,071
September 14	6:00 p.m.	at Richmond	No. 25	E. Claiborne Robins Stadium; Richmond, VA	FloSports	W 42–20	7,703
September 21	12:00 p.m.	at Wake Forest	No. 22	BB&T Field; Winston-Salem, NC	ACCRSN	L 7–49	24,079
September 28	2:00 p.m.	No. 2 James Madison	No. 24	Rhodes Stadium; Elon, NC	FloSports	L 10–45	11,926
October 5	3:30 p.m.	at New Hampshire		Wildcat Stadium; Durham, NH	FloSports	L 10–26	17,132
October 12	2:00 p.m.	No. 15 Delaware		Rhodes Stadium; Elon, NC	FloSports	W 42–7	5,572
October 26	1:00 p.m.	at Rhode Island		Meade Stadium; Kingston, RI	FloSports	W 38–13	8,911
November 2	2:00 p.m.	William & Mary^{†}		Rhodes Stadium; Elon, NC	FloSports	L 29–31 ^{5OT}	9,216
November 9	2:00 p.m.	Maine		Rhodes Stadium; Elon, NC	FloSports	L 17–31	4,424
November 23	2:00 p.m.	at No. 19 Towson		Johnny Unitas Stadium; Towson, MD	FloSports	W 25–23	4,537
*Non-conference game; ^{†}Homecoming; Rankings from STATS Poll released prior to the game; All times are in Eastern time

== Game summaries ==
=== At North Carolina A&T ===
	1	2	3	4	Total
No. 21 Phoenix	7	0	0	14	21
No. 20 Aggies	0	14	0	10	24

=== The Citadel ===
	1	2	3	4	Total
Bulldogs	0	7	7	14	28
Phoenix	7	14	7	7	35

=== At Richmond ===
	1	2	3	4	Total
No. 25 Phoenix	14	14	14	0	42
Spiders	0	7	6	7	20

=== At Wake Forest ===
	1	2	3	4	Total
No. 22 Phoenix	7	0	0	0	7
Demon Deacons	14	14	14	7	49

=== James Madison ===
	1	2	3	4	Total
No. 2 Dukes	14	7	17	7	45
No. 24 Phoenix	7	0	0	3	10

=== At New Hampshire ===
	1	2	3	4	Total
Phoenix	3	7	0	0	10
Wildcats	13	7	0	6	26

=== Delaware ===
	1	2	3	4	Total
No. 15 Fightin' Blue Hens	0	0	0	7	7
Phoenix	7	0	21	14	42

=== At Rhode Island ===
	1	2	3	4	Total
Phoenix	7	0	17	14	38
Rams	3	3	7	0	13

=== William & Mary ===
	1	2	3	4	OT	2OT	3OT	4OT	5OT	Total
Tribe	3	7	13	0	0	0	0	6	2	31
Phoenix	0	14	3	6	0	0	0	6	0	29

=== Maine ===
	1	2	3	4	Total
Black Bears	28	0	0	3	31
Phoenix	0	3	7	7	17

=== At Towson ===
	1	2	3	4	Total
Phoenix	0	3	16	6	25
No. 19 Tigers	14	3	3	3	23

== Ranking movements ==
Ranking movements Legend: ██ Increase in ranking ██ Decrease in ranking RV = Received votes
	Week													
Poll	Pre	1	2	3	4	5	6	7	8	9	10	11	12	Final
STATS FCS	21	RV	25	22	24									
Coaches	21	RV	RV	22	24									
