= Isaiah Coulter =

American football player (born 1998)

No. 5 – Fishers Freight
- Position: Wide receiver
- Roster status: Active

Personal information
- Born: September 18, 1998 (age 28); Columbia, Maryland, U.S.
- Listed height: 6 ft 2 in (1.88 m)
- Listed weight: 198 lb (90 kg)

Career information
- High school: Gwynn Park (Brandywine, Maryland)
- College: Rhode Island (2017–2019)
- NFL draft: 2020: 5th round, 171st overall pick

Career history
- Houston Texans (2020); Chicago Bears (2021–2022); Buffalo Bills (2022)*; Arizona Cardinals (2022)*; Buffalo Bills (2023)*; DC Defenders (2024)*; Winnipeg Blue Bombers (2024)*; Massachusetts Pirates (2025); Fishers Freight (2025–present)
- * Offseason or practice squad member only

Awards and highlights
- Second-team All-CAA (2019)
- Stats at Pro Football Reference

Isaiah Coulter (born September 18, 1998) is an American professional football wide receiver for the Fishers Freight of the Indoor Football League (IFL). He played college football for the Rhode Island Rams. He was selected 171 overall by the Houston Texans in the 2020 NFL draft.

== College career ==
Coulter played three years of high school football at Wilde Lake High School before transferring to Gwynn Park High School for his senior year. Coulter signed with Rhode Island, a Football Championship Subdivision school. He played linebacker before switching to wide receiver.

Coulter eclipsed the 1,000-yard receiving mark in his junior season, garnering 1,039 over the length of the schedule. In doing so, Coulter was the seventh Rams player to have a 1,000-yard receiving season. He was also named second-team all-Colonial Athletic Association.

After his junior season, Coulter participated in the 2020 NFL Combine, running the 40-yard dash in 4.45 seconds.

== Professional career ==
Pre-draft measurables
Height	Weight	Arm length	Hand span	Wingspan	40-yard dash	10-yard split	20-yard split	20-yard shuttle	Three-cone drill	Vertical jump	Broad jump
6 ft 1 7/8 in (1.88 m)	198 lb (90 kg)	31 3/4 in (0.81 m)	9 in (0.23 m)	6 ft 3 3/4 in (1.92 m)	4.45 s	1.51 s	2.59 s	4.62 s	7.28 s	36.0 in (0.91 m)	10 ft 1 in (3.07 m)
All values from NFL Combine

=== Houston Texans ===
Coulter was selected in the fifth round with the 171st overall pick in the 2020 NFL draft by the Houston Texans. He was placed on injured reserve on September 7, 2020. He was designated to return from injured reserve on October 7, and began practicing with the team again. He was activated on October 28. He was waived on August 16, 2021.

=== Chicago Bears ===
On August 22, 2021, Coulter signed with the Chicago Bears. He was waived on August 31, 2021, and re-signed to the practice squad the next day. He signed a reserve/future contract with the Bears on January 11, 2022.

On August 30, 2022, Coulter was waived by the Bears and signed to the practice squad the next day. On October 18, 2022, Coulter was promoted to the Bears' active roster. He was waived on November 1.

=== Buffalo Bills (first stint) ===
On November 3, 2022, Coulter was signed to the Buffalo Bills practice squad. He was released from the practice squad on December 9, 2022.

=== Arizona Cardinals ===
On January 4, 2023, Coulter signed with the Arizona Cardinals' practice squad. He was released three days later on January 7, 2023.

=== Buffalo Bills (second stint) ===
On January 9, 2023, Coulter signed a reserve/future contract with the Buffalo Bills. He was released on August 27, 2023.

=== DC Defenders ===
On March 6, 2024, Coulter signed with the DC Defenders of the United Football League (UFL). He was released on March 10.

=== Winnipeg Blue Bombers ===
On March 17, 2024, Coulter signed with the Winnipeg Blue Bombers of the Canadian Football League (CFL). He was released on June 2.

=== Massachusetts Pirates ===
On January 30, 2025, Coulter signed with the Massachusetts Pirates of the Indoor Football League (IFL).

=== Fishers Freight ===
On July 10, 2025, Coulter signed with the Fishers Freight of the IFL.
