= 2019 Missouri Valley Football Conference season =

American college football conference season

- League: NCAA Division I Football Championship Subdivision
- Sport: Football
- Duration: August 24, 2019 through January 11, 2020
- Teams: 10

2020 NFL Draft
- Top draft pick: Jeremy Chinn, S, Southern Illinois
- Picked by: Carolina Panthers (round 2, pick 64)

Regular season
- Champion Playoff Participants: North Dakota State South Dakota State; Illinois State; Northern Iowa

Football seasons
- 2018 2020

2019 Missouri Valley Football Conference standings
	Conf.			Overall
Team	W		L	W		L
No. 1 North Dakota State $^	8	–	0	16	–	0
No. 5 Northern Iowa ^	6	–	2	10	–	5
No. 7 Illinois State ^	5	–	3	10	–	5
No. 10 South Dakota State ^	5	–	3	8	–	5
Southern Illinois	5	–	3	7	–	5
South Dakota	4	–	4	5	–	7
Indiana State	3	–	5	5	–	7
Youngstown State	2	–	6	6	–	6
Missouri State	1	–	7	1	–	10
Western Illinois	1	–	7	1	–	11
$ – Conference champion; ^ – FCS playoff participant; Rankings from STATS Poll

The 2019 Missouri Valley Football Conference season was the 34th season of college football play for the Missouri Valley Football Conference and part of the 2019 NCAA Division I FCS football season. This was the MVFC's 8th consecutive season with 10 teams, and would be their last for now as they added North Dakota in the following offseason.

North Dakota State won the conference title and achieved the number 1 overall seed again in the 2019 FCS Playoffs. The Bison would go on to win their 8th National Championship in 9 years. South Dakota State, Illinois State, and Northern Iowa all made the playoffs, with the Jacks being the number 7 overall seed. Illinois State and Northern Iowa both played in the first round. Illinois State beat Southeast Missouri State and Northern Iowa beat San Diego to advance to the second round. In the second round, Illinois State beat 8th overall seed Central Arkansas and Northern Iowa upset South Dakota State to both advance to the quarterfinals. North Dakota State beat Nicholls to advance to the quarterfinals. In the quarterfinals, NDSU beat Illinois State to advance to the semifinals, and Northern Iowa lost to 2nd seeded James Madison. North Dakota State would beat Montana State in the semifinals, and James Madison in the championship.

== Coaching changes ==
=== North Dakota State ===
On December 13, 2018, Matt Entz was named the new head coach at North Dakota State. Entz takes over for Chris Klieman, who left the program for a head coaching job at Kansas State. The Wildcats allowed Klieman to finish out the 2018 playoffs at NDSU before heading to Manhattan.

== Preseason ==
=== MVFC Media Day ===
==== Preseason Poll ====
The annual preseason poll; voted on by conference coaches, athletic directors, and media members.

Predicted finish	Team	Points (1st place votes)
1	North Dakota State	392 (32)
2	South Dakota State	348 (4)
3	Illinois State	289 (3)
4	Indiana State	279 (1)
5	Northern Iowa	266
6	South Dakota	176
7	Youngstown State	153
8	Western Illinois	128
9	Southern Illinois	89
10	Missouri State	80

=== Preseason awards ===
==== Individual awards ====
Award	Player	School	Position	Year
Preseason Team Offense	Ryan Boyle	Indiana State	QB	Sr.
Preseason Team Offense	D.J. Davis	Southern Illinois	RB	Sr.
Preseason Team Offense	James Robinson	Illinois State	RB	Sr.
Preseason Team Offense	Pierre Strong Jr.	South Dakota State	RB	So.
Preseason Team Offense	Clint Ratkovich	Western Illinois	FB	Jr.
Preseason Team Offense	Dakarai Allen	South Dakota	WR	Sr.
Preseason Team Offense	Dante Hendrix	Indiana State	WR	So.
Preseason Team Offense	Cade Johnson	South Dakota State	WR	Jr.
Preseason Team Offense	Briley Moore	Northern Iowa	TE	Sr.
Preseason Team Offense	Drew Himmelman	Illinois State	OL	Jr.
Preseason Team Offense	Zack Johnson	North Dakota State	OL	Sr.
Preseason Team Offense	Dillon Radunz	North Dakota State	OL	Jr.
Preseason Team Offense	Jackson Scott-Brown	Northern Iowa	OL	Sr.
Preseason Team Offense	Wyatt Wozniak	Indiana State	OL	Sr.
Preseason Team Defense	Ryan Earith	South Dakota State	DL	Sr.
Preseason Team Defense	Darin Greenfield	South Dakota	DL	Sr.
Preseason Team Defense	Anthony Knighton	Southern Illinois	DL	Jr.
Preseason Team Defense	Derrek Tuszka	North Dakota State	DL	Sr.
Preseason Team Defense	Jabril Cox	North Dakota State	LB	Jr.
Preseason Team Defense	Angelo Garbutt	Missouri State	LB	Sr.
Preseason Team Defense	Jonas Griffith	Indiana State	LB	Sr.
Preseason Team Defense	Christian Rozeboom	South Dakota State	LB	Sr.
Preseason Team Defense	Jeremy Chinn	Southern Illinois	DB	Sr.
Preseason Team Defense	James Hendricks	North Dakota State	DB	Sr.
Preseason Team Defense	Luther Kirk	Illinois State	DB	Sr.
Preseason Team Defense	Devin Taylor	Illinois State	DB	Jr.
Preseason Team Defense	Xavior Williams	Northern Iowa	DB	Jr.
Preseason Team Special Teams	Bradey Sorensen	South Dakota State	LS	Jr.
Preseason Team Special Teams	Jerry Nunez	Indiana State	PK	Sr.
Preseason Team Special Teams	Garret Wegner	North Dakota State	P	Jr.
Preseason Team Special Teams	Je'Quan Burton	Southern Illinois	RS	So.

== Rankings ==
Legend
	Improvement in ranking
	Drop in ranking
	Not ranked previous week
	No change in ranking from previous week
RV	Received votes but were not ranked in Top 25 of poll
т	Tied with team above or below also with this symbol

		Pre	Wk 1	Wk 2	Wk 3	Wk 4	Wk 5	Wk 6	Wk 7	Wk 8	Wk 9	Wk 10	Wk 11	Wk 12	Wk 13	Final
Illinois State	STATS Perform	15	16	13	15	14	10	14	11	8	7	11	7	7	13	7
Illinois State	AFCA Coaches	13	16	12	10	8	6	13	10	7	7	12	8	6	14	7
Indiana State	STATS Perform	16	14													
Indiana State	AFCA Coaches	16	15													
Missouri State	STATS Perform															
Missouri State	AFCA Coaches															
North Dakota State	STATS Perform	1	1	1	1	1	1	1	1	1	1	1	1	1	1	1
North Dakota State	AFCA Coaches	1	1	1	1	1	1	1	1	1	1	1	1	1	1	1
Northern Iowa	STATS Perform	18	11	11	9	9	13	10	14	11	9	5	4	9	6	5
Northern Iowa	AFCA Coaches	20	12	10	8	7	13	10	15	12	10	7	5	10	6	5
South Dakota	STATS Perform															
South Dakota	AFCA Coaches															
South Dakota State	STATS Perform	3	3	3	3	3	3	3	3	3	4	4	8	5	10	10
South Dakota State	AFCA Coaches	4	3	3	3	3	3	3	3	3	5	4	9	5	12	12
Southern Illinois	STATS Perform															
Southern Illinois	AFCA Coaches													25т	25	
Western Illinois	STATS Perform															
Western Illinois	AFCA Coaches															
Youngstown State	STATS Perform				24	22	18	19	19							
Youngstown State	AFCA Coaches				21	20	17	17	18							

== Schedule ==
Index to colors and formatting
MVFC member won
MVFC member lost
MVFC teams in **bold**

All times Central time.

† denotes Homecoming game
^ denotes AP Poll ranking for FBS teams

=== Regular season schedule ===
==== Week 0 ====
Date	Time	Visiting team	Home team	Site	TV	Result	Attendance	Ref.
August 24	3:00 PM	Samford	**Youngstown State**	Cramton Bowl • Montgomery, AL		**W** 45–22	12,560	
^{#}Rankings from Stats Perform. All times are in Central Time.

==== Week 1 ====
Date	Time	Visiting team	Home team	Site	TV	Result	Attendance	Ref.
August 29	6:30 PM	**Southern Illinois**	No. 17 Southeast Missouri State	Houck Stadium • Cape Girardeau, MO	ESPN+	**L** 26–44	8,312	
August 29	7:00 PM	**Western Illinois**	North Alabama	Braly Municipal Stadium • Florence, AL	ESPN+	**L** 17–26	10,567	
August 29	8:00 PM	No. 3 **South Dakota State**	Minnesota	TCF Bank Stadium • Minneapolis, MN	FS1	**L** 21–28	49,112	
August 29	8:00 PM	**Missouri State**	Northern Arizona	Walkup Skydome • Flagstaff, AZ	Pluto TV	**L** 23–37	6,891	
August 31	11:00 AM	No. 16 **Indiana State**	Kansas	David Booth Kansas Memorial Stadium • Lawrence, KS	FOX	**L** 17–24	32,611	
August 31	11:00 AM	No. 18 **Northern Iowa**	No. 21^ Iowa State	Jack Trice Stadium • Ames, IA	Big 12 on ESPN+	**L** 26–29^{(3OT)}	61,500	
August 31	2:00 PM	No. 25 Montana	**South Dakota**	DakotaDome • Vermillion, SD	ESPN+	**L** 17–31	5,193	
August 31	3:00 PM	Butler	No. 1 **North Dakota State**	Target Field • Minneapolis, MN	ESPN+	**W** 57–10	34,544	
August 31	6:00 PM	No. 15 **Illinois State**	Northern Illinois	Huskie Stadium • DeKalb, IL	ESPN+	**L** 10–24	14,568	
^{#}Rankings from Stats Perform. All times are in Central Time.

==== Week 2 ====
Date	Time	Visiting team	Home team	Site	TV	Result	Attendance	Ref.
September 7	1:00 PM	Dayton	No. 14 **Indiana State**	Memorial Stadium • Terre Haute, IN		**L** 35–42	4,950	
September 7	2:00 PM	Howard	**Youngstown State**	Stambaugh Stadium • Youngstown, OH		**W** 54–28	12,390	
September 7	2:30 PM	North Dakota	No. 1 **North Dakota State**	Fargodome • Fargo, ND	ESPN+	**W** 38–7	18,923	
September 7	2:30 PM	**Southern Illinois**	UMass	McGuirk Stadium • Amherts, MA	FloSports	**W** 45–20	10,524	
September 7	3:00 PM	**Western Illinois**	Colorado State	Canvas Stadium • Fort Collins, CO		**L** 13–38	24	
September 7	4:00 PM	Southern Utah	No. 11 **Northern Iowa**	UNI-Dome • Cedar Falls, IA		**W** 34–14	9,241	
September 7	6:00 PM	**South Dakota**	No. 4^ Oklahoma	Gaylord Family Oklahoma Memorial Stadium • Norman, OK		**L** 14–70	82,181	
September 7	6:00 PM	Long Island	No. 3 **South Dakota State**	Dana J. Dykhouse Stadium • Brookings, SD		**W** 38–3	10,153	
September 7	6:30 PM	Morehead State	No. 16 **Illinois State**	Hancock Stadium • Normal, IL	ESPN+	**W** 42–14	11,256	
^{#}Rankings from Stats Perform. All times are in Central Time.

Date	Bye Week
September 7	Missouri State

==== Week 3 ====
Date	Time	Visiting team	Home team	Site	TV	Result	Attendance	Ref.
September 14	12:00 PM	No. 1 **North Dakota State**	No. 18 Delaware	Delaware Stadium • Newark, DE	FloSports	**W** 47–22	14,489	
September 14	1:00 PM	Eastern Kentucky	**Indiana State**	Memorial Stadium • Terre Haute, IN		**W** 19–7	4,416	
September 14	1:00 PM	Drake	No. 3 **South Dakota State**	Dana J. Dykhouse Stadium • Brookings, SD		**W** 38–10	11,565	
September 14	2:00 PM	Duquesne	**Youngstown State**	Stambaugh Stadium • Youngstown, OH		**W** 34–14	15,991	
September 14	2:00 PM	Houston Baptist	**South Dakota**	DakotaDome • Vermillion, SD	ESPN3	**L** 52–53	5,077	
September 14	2:00 PM	No. 13 **Illinois State**	Eastern Illinois	O'Brien Field • Charleston, IL	ESPN+	**W** 21–3	6,119	
September 14	3:00 PM	No. 10 Montana State	**Western Illinois**	Hanson Field • Macomb, IL	ESPN+	**L** 14–23	4,728	
September 14	6:00 PM	UT Martin	**Southern Illinois**	Saluki Stadium • Carbondale, IL	ESPN+	**W** 28–14	8,983	
September 14	7:00 PM	**Missouri State**	Tulane	Yulman Stadium • New Orleans, LA	ESPN3	**L** 6–58	18,746	
^{#}Rankings from Stats Perform. All times are in Central Time.

Date	Bye Week
September 14	Northern Iowa

==== Week 4 ====
Date	Time	Visiting team	Home team	Site	TV	Result	Attendance	Ref.
September 21	1:00 PM	Eastern Illinois	**Indiana State**	Memorial Stadium • Terre Haute, IN		**W** 16–6	6,216	
September 21	2:00 PM	No. 6 Kennesaw State	**Missouri State**	Robert W. Plaster Stadium • Springfield, MO	ESPN+	**L** 24–35	11,421	
September 21	2:30 PM	No. 4 UC Davis	No. 1 **North Dakota State**	Fargodome • Fargo, ND	ESPN+	**W** 27–16	18,425	
September 21	3:00 PM	**South Dakota**	Northern Colorado	Nottingham Field • Greeley, CO	Pluto TV	**W** 14–6	5,745	
September 21	3:00 PM	Tennessee Tech	**Western Illinois**	Hanson Field • Macomb, IL	ESPN3	**L** 24–38	1,594	
September 21	4:00 PM	Idaho State	No. 9 **Northern Iowa**	UNI-Dome • Cedar Falls, IA		**W** 13–6	8,339	
September 21	6:00 PM	**Southern Illinois**	Arkansas State	Centennial Bank Stadium • Jonesboro, AR	ESPN3	**L** 28–41	24,176	
September 21	6:00 PM	Southern Utah	No. 3 **South Dakota State**	Dana J. Dykhouse Stadium • Brookings, SD		**W** 43–7	14,269	
September 21	6:30 PM	Northern Arizona	No. 15 **Illinois State**	Hancock Stadium • Normal, IL	ESPN+	**W** 40–27	9,891	
^{#}Rankings from Stats Perform. All times are in Central Time.

Date	Bye Week
September 21	No. 24 Youngstown State

==== Week 5 ====
Date	Time	Visiting team	Home team	Site	TV	Result	Attendance	Ref.
September 28	6:00 PM	Robert Morris	No. 22 **Youngstown State**	Stambaugh Stadium • Youngstown, OH		**W** 45–10	12,659	
September 28	7:00 PM	No. 9 **Northern Iowa**	No. 5 Weber State	Stewart Stadium • Ogden, UT		**L** 17–29	6,582	
^{#}Rankings from Stats Perform. All times are in Central Time.

Date	Bye Week							
September 28	No. 1 North Dakota State	No. 3 South Dakota State	No. 14 Illinois State	Missouri State	Indiana State	South Dakota	Southern Illinois	Western Illinois

==== Week 6 ====
Date	Time	Visiting team	Home team	Site	TV	Result	Attendance	Ref.
October 5	12:00 PM	No. 1 **North Dakota State**	No. 10 **Illinois State**	Hancock Stadium • Normal, IL	ESPN+	**NDSU** 37–3	13,391	
October 5	2:00 PM	**Southern Illinois**	No. 3 **South Dakota State**	Dana J. Dykhouse Stadium • Brookings, SD	ESPN+	**SDSU** 38–10	13,776	
October 5	2:00 PM	**Indiana State**	**South Dakota**	DakotaDome • Vermillion, SD	ESPN+	**USD** 38–0	5,255	
October 5	3:00 PM	**Missouri State**	**Western Illinois**	Hanson Field • Macomb, IL	ESPN+	**MOST** 37–31^{(3OT)}	3,149	
October 5	4:00 PM	No. 18 **Youngstown State**	No. 13 **Northern Iowa**	UNI-Dome • Cedar Falls, IA	ESPN+	**UNI** 21–14	10,137	
^{#}Rankings from Stats Perform. All times are in Central Time.

==== Week 7 ====
Date	Time	Visiting team	Home team	Site	TV	Result	Attendance	Ref.
October 12	12:00 PM	**Western Illinois**	**Indiana State**	Memorial Stadium • Terre Haute, IN	ESPN+	**INST** 20–10	7,243	
October 12	1:00 PM	No. 10 **Northern Iowa**	No. 1 **North Dakota State**†	Fargodome • Fargo, ND	ESPN+	**NDSU** 46–14	18,178	
October 12	2:00 PM	**South Dakota**	**Missouri State**	Robert W. Plaster Stadium • Springfield, MO	ESPN3	**USD** 45–10	5,784	
October 12	5:00 PM	No. 3 **South Dakota State**	No. 19 **Youngstown State**	Stambaugh Stadium • Youngstown, OH	ESPN+	**SDSU** 38–28	12,381	
October 12	6:00 PM	No. 13 **Illinois State**	**Southern Illinois**	Saluki Stadium • Carbondale, IL	ESPN3	**ILST** 21–7	5,525	
^{#}Rankings from Stats Perform. All times are in Central Time.

==== Week 8 ====
Date	Time	Visiting team	Home team	Site	TV	Result	Attendance	Ref.
October 19	12:00 PM	No. 3 **South Dakota State**	**Indiana State**	Memorial Stadium • Terre Haute, IN	ESPN3	**SDSU** 42–23	4,642	
October 19	1:00 PM	No. 10 **Illinois State**	**Western Illinois**	Hanson Field • Macomb, IL	ESPN+	**ILST** 28–14	2,984	
October 19	2:00 PM	No. 18 **Youngstown State**	**Southern Illinois**†	Saluki Stadium • Carbondale, IL	ESPN+	**SIU** 35–10	7,670	
October 19	2:30 PM	**Missouri State**	No. 1 **North Dakota State**	Fargodome • Fargo, ND	ESPN+	**NDSU** 22–0	18,252	
October 19	4:00 PM	**South Dakota**	No. 14 **Northern Iowa**	UNI-Dome • Cedar Falls, IA	ESPN+	**UNI** 42–27	10,201	
^{#}Rankings from Stats Perform. All times are in Central Time.

==== Week 9 ====
In Week 9, the 2019 edition of the Dakota Marker was preceded by ESPN's College Gameday on the campus of South Dakota State University.

Date	Time	Visiting team	Home team	Site	TV	Result	Attendance	Ref.
October 26	1:00 PM	**Western Illinois**	**Youngstown State**	Stambaugh Stadium • Youngstown, OH	ESPN+	**YSU** 59–14	10,437	
October 26	2:00 PM	No. 11 **Northern Iowa**	**Missouri State**†	Robert W. Plaster Stadium • Springfield, MO	ESPN+	**UNI** 29–6	6,583	
October 26	2:00 PM	No. 1 **North Dakota State**	No. 3 **South Dakota State**	Dana J. Dykhouse Stadium • Brookings, SD	ESPN+	**NDSU** 23–16	19,371	
October 26	2:00 PM	**Indiana State**	No. 8 **Illinois State**	Hancock Stadium • Normal, IL	ESPN3	**ILST** 24–7	8,510	
October 26	4:00 PM	**Southern Illinois**	**South Dakota**	DakotaDome • Vermillion, SD	ESPN+	**SIU** 48–28	4,734	
^{#}Rankings from Stats Perform. All times are in Central Time.

==== Week 10 ====
Date	Time	Visiting team	Home team	Site	TV	Result	Attendance	Ref.
November 2	12:00 PM	No. 9 **Northern Iowa**	No. 7 **Illinois State**	Hancock Stadium • Normal, IL	ESPN+	**UNI** 27–10	6,705	
November 2	12:00 PM	**Southern Illinois**	**Indiana State**	Memorial Stadium • Terre Haute, IN	ESPN+	**MOST** 23–14	4,110	
November 2	1:00 PM	**South Dakota**	**Western Illinois**	Hanson Field • Macomb, IL	ESPN+	**WIU** 38–34	1,728	
November 2	2:00 PM	No. 4 **South Dakota State**	**Missouri State**	Robert W. Plaster Stadium • Springfield, MO	ESPN3	**SDSU** 35–14	5,108	
November 2	5:00 PM	No. 1 **North Dakota State**	**Youngstown State**	Stambaugh Stadium • Youngstown, OH	ESPN+	**NDSU** 56–17	11,102	
^{#}Rankings from Stats Perform. All times are in Central Time.

==== Week 11 ====
Date	Time	Visiting team	Home team	Site	TV	Result	Attendance	Ref.
November 9	2:00 PM	**Youngstown State**	**South Dakota**	DakotaDome • Vermillion, SD	ESPN+	**USD** 56–21	4,561	
November 9	2:00 PM	No. 11 **Illinois State**	No. 4 **South Dakota State**	Dana J. Dykhouse Stadium • Brookings, SD	ESPN+	**ILST** 27–18	7,211	
November 9	2:00 PM	**Missouri State**	**Southern Illinois**	Saluki Stadium • Carbondale, IL	ESPN3	**SIU** 37–14	4,678	
November 9	2:30 PM	**Western Illinois**	No. 1 **North Dakota State**	Fargodome • Fargo, ND	ESPN+	**NDSU** 57–21	17,441	
November 9	4:00 PM	**Indiana State**	No. 5 **Northern Iowa**	UNI-Dome • Cedar Falls, IA	ESPN+	**UNI** 17–9	8,442	
^{#}Rankings from Stats Perform. All times are in Central Time.

==== Week 12 ====
Date	Time	Visiting team	Home team	Site	TV	Result	Attendance	Ref.
November 16	1:00 PM	**Youngstown State**	**Indiana State**	Memorial Stadium • Terre Haute, IN		**INST** 24–17	3,645	
November 16	12:00 PM	**Missouri State**	No. 7 **Illinois State**	Hancock Stadium • Normal, IL	ESPN+	**ILST** 17–12	5,701	
November 16	1:00 PM	**Southern Illinois**	**Western Illinois**	Hanson Field • Macomb, IL	ESPN+	**SIU** 45–21	1,739	
November 16	2:00 PM	No. 4 **Northern Iowa**	No. 8 **South Dakota State**	Dana J. Dykhouse Stadium • Brookings, SD	ESPN3	**SDSU** 38–7	7,317	
November 16	2:30 PM	**South Dakota**	No. 1 **North Dakota State**	Fargodome • Fargo, ND	ESPN+	**NDSU** 49–14	17,844	
^{#}Rankings from Stats Perform. All times are in Central Time.

==== Week 13 ====
Date	Time	Visiting team	Home team	Site	TV	Result	Attendance	Ref.
November 23	11:00 AM	No. 7 **Illinois State**	**Youngstown State**	Stambaugh Stadium • Youngstown, OH	ESPN+	**YSU** 21–3	9,190	
November 23	1:00 PM	**Western Illinois**	No. 9 **Northern Iowa**	UNI-Dome • Cedar Falls, IA	ESPN+	**UNI** 38–7	8,920	
November 23	2:00 PM	No. 1 **North Dakota State**	**Southern Illinois**	Saluki Stadium • Carbondale, IL	ESPN+	**NDSU** 21–7	5,423	
November 23	2:00 PM	No. 5 **South Dakota State**	**South Dakota**	DakotaDome • Vermillion, SD	ESPN+	**USD** 24–21	5,405	
November 23	2:00 PM	**Indiana State**	**Missouri State**	Robert W. Plaster Stadium • Springfield, MO	ESPN+	**INST** 51–24	3,352	
^{#}Rankings from Stats Perform. All times are in Central Time.

== Postseason ==
In 2019, four MVFC teams made the FCS playoffs. North Dakota State (No. 1) and South Dakota State (No. 7) both received a first round bye. Illinois State and Northern Iowa both were unseeded and played in the first round.

Index to colors and formatting
MVFC member won
MVFC member lost
MVFC teams in **bold**

All times Central time. Tournament seedings in parentheses

=== First round ===
Date	Time	Visiting team	Home team	Site	TV	Result	Attendance	Ref.
November 30	1:00 PM	No. 13 **Illinois State**	No. 12 Southeast Missouri State (OVC)	Houck Stadium • Cape Girardeau, MO	ESPN3	**W** 24–6	3,274	
November 30	1:00 PM	San Diego (PFL)	No. 6 **Northern Iowa**	UNI-Dome • Cedar Falls, IA	ESPN+	**W** 17–3	3,743	
^{#}Rankings from Stats Perform. All times are in Central Time.

=== Second round ===
Date	Time	Visiting team	Home team	Site	TV	Result	Attendance	Ref.
December 7	1:00 PM	No. 6 **Northern Iowa**	No. 10 **South Dakota State**	Dana J. Dykhouse Stadium • Brookings, SD	ESPN3	**UNI** 13–10	4,102	
December 7	2:00 PM	No. 13 **Illinois State**	No. 9 **Central Arkansas** (ASUN)	Estes Stadium • Conway, AR	ESPN3	**W** 24–14	5,127	
December 7	2:30 PM	No. 19 Nicholls (Southland)	No. 1 (1) **North Dakota State**	Fargodome • Fargo, ND	ESPN3	**W** 37–13	15,690	
^{#}Rankings from Stats Perform. All times are in Central Time.

=== Quarterfinals ===
Date	Time	Visiting team	Home team	Site	TV	Result	Attendance	Ref.
December 13	6:00 PM	No. 6 **Northern Iowa**	No. 2 (2) James Madison (CAA)	Bridgeforth Stadium • Harrisonburg, VA	ESPN2	**L** 0–17	8,741	
December 14	11:00 AM	No. 13 **Illinois State**	No. 1 **North Dakota State**	Fargodome • Fargo, ND	ESPN	**NDSU** 9–3	14,132	
^{#}Rankings from Stats Perform. All times are in Central Time.

=== Semifinals ===
Date	Time	Visiting team	Home team	Site	TV	Result	Attendance	Ref.
December 21	1:00 PM	No. 5 (5) Montana State (Big Sky)	No. 1 (1) **North Dakota State**	Fargodome • Fargo, ND	ESPN2	**W** 42–14	18,077	
^{#}Rankings from Stats Perform. All times are in Central Time.

=== National Championship ===
Date	Time	Visiting team	Home team	Site	TV	Result	Attendance	Ref.
January 11	11:00 AM	No. 2 (2) James Madison (CAA)	No. 1 (1) **North Dakota State**	Toyota Stadium • Frisco, TX	ABC	**W** 28–20	17,866	
^{#}Rankings from Stats Perform. All times are in Central Time.

== MVFC records vs other conferences ==
2019-20 records against non-conference foes (through January 11, 2020):

FCS Power Conferences	Record
Big Sky	5–3
CAA	2–0
FCS Power Total	7–3
Other FCS Conferences	Record
ASUN	0–1
Big South	1–0
Ivy League	None
MEAC	1–0
Northeast	2–0
OVC	4–1
Patriot	None
PFL	4–0
SoCon	1–0
Southland	1–1
SWAC	None
WAC	2–0
FCS Independents	1–0
Other FCS Total	17–3
FBS Opponents	Record
Football Bowl Subdivision	1–7
Total Non-Conference Record	25–13

Post Season

FCS Power Conferences	Record
Big Sky	1–0
CAA	1–1
FCS Power Total	2–1
Other FCS Conferences	Record
ASUN	1–0
Big South	None
Ivy League	None
MEAC	None
Northeast	None
OVC	1–0
Patriot	None
PFL	1–0
SoCon	None
Southland	1–0
SWAC	None
WAC	None
Other FCS Total	4–0
Total Postseason Record	6–1

== Awards and honors ==
=== Player of the week honors ===
Week	Offensive			Defensive			Special Teams			Newcomer		
Week	Player	Position	Team	Player	Position	Team	Player	Position	Team	Player	Position	Team
Week 1 (Sept. 1)	Trey Lance	QB	NDSU	Kaleb Brewer	DL	INST	Matthew Cook	PK	UNI	Trey Lance	QB	NDSU
Week 2 (Sept. 8)	Javon Williams	RB	SIU	Christian Rozeboom	LB	SDSU	Jaxon Janke	PR/WR	SDSU	Will McElvain	QB	UNI
Week 3 (Sept. 15)	Austin Simmons	QB	USD	Inoke Moala	DL	INST	Griffin Crosa	K	NDSU	Tre' Strong	CB	SIU
Week 4 (Sept. 22)	Brady Davis	QB	ILST	Elerson G. Smith	DL	UNI	Sam Fenlason	PK	ILST	Avante Cox	WR	SIU
Week 5 (Sept. 29)	Joe Alessi	RB	YSU	Chris Kolarevic	LB	UNI	Jake Coates	PR	YSU	Will McElvian	QB	UNI
Week 6 (Oct. 6)	Austin Simmons	QB	USD	Elerson Smith	DE	UNI	Brendan Withrow	P	MOST	Trey Lance	QB	NDSU
Week 7 (Oct. 13)	J'Bore Gibbs	QB	SDSU	Clayton Glasco	LB	INST	Garret Wegner	PK	NDSU	J'Bore Gibbs	QB	SDSU
Week 8 (Oct. 20)	Isaiah Weston	WR	UNI	Chris Kolarevic	LB	UNI	Jack Colquhoun	P	SIU	Javon Williams	RB	SIU
Week 9 (Oct. 27)	Avante Cox	WR	SIU	Josh Hayes	CB	NDSU	Matthew Cook	PK	UNI	Avante Cox	WR	SIU
Week 10 (Nov. 3)	Connor Sampson	QB	WIU	Omar Brown	DB	UNI	Kobe Johnson	RB/KR	NDSU	Omar Brown	DB	UNI
Week 11 (Nov. 10)	Austin Simmons	QB	USD	Dylan Draka	LB	ILST	Sam Fenlason	PK	ILST	Jalen Bussey	RB	NDSU
Week 12 (Nov. 17)	D.J. Davis	RB	SIU	Devin Taylor	DB	ILST	Brendan Withrow	P	MOST	Javon Williams Jr.	RB	SIU
Week 12 (Nov. 17)	D.J. Davis	RB	SIU	Devin Taylor	DB	ILST	Brendan Withrow	P	MOST	Keaton Heide	QB	SDSU
Week 13 (Nov. 24)	Nathan Mays	QB	YSU	Justus Reed	DE	YSU	Dalton Godfrey	LS	USD	Dominique Dafney	WR	INST
Week 13 (Nov. 24)	Dominique Dafney	WR	INST	Justus Reed	DE	YSU	Dalton Godfrey	LS	USD	Dominique Dafney	WR	INST

=== Players of the Year ===
On November 27, 2021, the Missouri Valley Football Conference released their Players of the Year and All-Conference Honors.

==== Offensive Player of the Year ====
- Trey Lance, QB (Fr, North Dakota State)

==== Defensive Player of the Year ====
- Derrek Tuszka, DE (Sr, North Dakota State)

==== Newcomer of the Year ====
- Trey Lance, QB (Fr, North Dakota State)

==== Freshman of the Year ====
- Trey Lance, QB (North Dakota State)

==== Coach of the Year ====
- Matt Entz (North Dakota State)

=== All-Conference Teams ===
Award	Player	School	Position	Year
First Team Offense	Trey Lance	North Dakota State	QB	Fr.
First Team Offense	James Robinson	Illinois State	RB	Sr.
First Team Offense	Pierre Strong Jr.	South Dakota State	RB	So.
First Team Offense	Clint Ratkovich	Western Illinois	FB	Jr.
First Team Offense	Dante Hendrix	Indiana State	WR	So.
First Team Offense	Cade Johnson	South Dakota State	WR	Jr.
First Team Offense	Isaiah Weston	Northern Iowa	WR	So.
First Team Offense	Ben Ellefson	North Dakota State	TE	Sr.
First Team Offense	Drew Himmelman	Illinois State	OL	Jr.
First Team Offense	Zack Johnson	North Dakota State	OL	Sr.
First Team Offense	Dillon Radunz	North Dakota State	OL	Jr.
First Team Offense	Jackson Scott-Brown	Northern Iowa	OL	Sr.
First Team Offense	Cordell Volson	North Dakota State	OL	Jr.
First Team Defense	Romeo McKnight	Illinois State	DL	Jr.
First Team Defense	Justus Reed	Youngstown State	DL	Jr.
First Team Defense	Elerson Smith	Northern Iowa	DL	Jr.
First Team Defense	Derrek Tuszka	North Dakota State	DL	Sr.
First Team Defense	Jabril Cox	North Dakota State	LB	Jr.
First Team Defense	McNeece Egbim	Missouri State	LB	Sr.
First Team Defense	Jonas Griffith	Indiana State	LB	Sr.
First Team Defense	Christian Rozeboom	South Dakota State	LB	Sr.
First Team Defense	Omar Brown	Northern Iowa	DB	Fr.
First Team Defense	Jeremy Chinn	Southern Illinois	DB	Sr.
First Team Defense	James Hendricks	North Dakota State	DB	Sr.
First Team Defense	Luther Kirk	Illinois State	DB	Sr.
First Team Defense	Devin Taylor	Illinois State	DB	Jr.
First Team Special Teams	Matthew Cook	Northern Iowa	PK	Fr.
First Team Special Teams	Chandler Collins	Missouri State	LS	Sr.
First Team Special Teams	Brady Schutt	South Dakota	P	Jr.
First Team Special Teams	Dakota Caton	Indiana State	RS	So.

Award	Player	School	Position	Year
Second Team Offense	Austin Simmons	South Dakota	QB	Sr.
Second Team Offense	D.J. Davis	Southern Illinois	RB	Sr.
Second Team Offense	Javon Williams Jr.	Southern Illinois	RB	Fr.
Second Team Offense	Dominique Dafney	Indiana State	FB	Sr.
Second Team Offense	Luke Sellers	South Dakota State	FB	Sr.
Second Team Offense	Avante Cox	Southern Illinois	WR	So.
Second Team Offense	Caleb Vander Esch	South Dakota	WR	Jr.
Second Team Offense	Christian Watson	North Dakota State	WR	So.
Second Team Offense	Brett Samson	South Dakota	TE	Jr.
Second Team Offense	Spencer Brown	Northern Iowa	OL	Jr.
Second Team Offense	Matt Clark	South Dakota State	OL	Sr.
Second Team Offense	Ernest Dye Jr.	Southern Illinois	OL	Sr.
Second Team Offense	Zeveyon Furcron	Southern Illinois	OL	Jr.
Second Team Offense	Wyatt Wozniak	Indiana State	OL	Sr.
Second Team Defense	Jared Brinkman	Northern Iowa	DL	Jr.
Second Team Defense	Ryan Earith	South Dakota State	DL	Sr.
Second Team Defense	Darin Greenfield	South Dakota	DL	Sr.
Second Team Defense	Ma'Lik Richmond	Youngstown State	DL	Sr.
Second Team Defense	Jack Cochrane	South Dakota	LB	Jr.
Second Team Defense	Cody Crider	Southern Illinois	LB	Sr.
Second Team Defense	Ty DeForest	Illinois State	LB	Sr.
Second Team Defense	Chris Kolarevic	Northern Iowa	LB	So.
Second Team Defense	Marquise Bridges	North Dakota State	DB	Sr.
Second Team Defense	Qua Brown	Southern Illinois	DB	Jr.
Second Team Defense	Don Gardner	South Dakota State	DB	Jr.
Second Team Defense	Josh Hayes	North Dakota State	DB	Jr.
Second Team Defense	Xavior Williams	Northern Iowa	DB	Jr.
Second Team Special Teams	Jerry Nunez	Indiana State	PK	Sr.
Second Team Special Teams	Jared Drake	Western Illinois	LS	Sr.
Second Team Special Teams	Brendan Withrow	Missouri State	P	Sr.
Second Team Special Teams	Jake Coates	Youngstown State	RS	Jr.

=== All-Newcomer Team ===
Award	Player	School	Position	Year
Newcomer Team Offense	Trey Lance	North Dakota State	QB	Fr.
Newcomer Team Offense	J'Bore Gibbs	South Dakota State	QB	Fr.
Newcomer Team Offense	Will McElvain	Northern Iowa	QB	Fr.
Newcomer Team Offense	Kobe Johnson	North Dakota State	RB	Fr.
Newcomer Team Offense	Jeff Proctor	Illinois State	RB	Jr.
Newcomer Team Offense	Javon Williams Jr.	Southern Illinois	RB	Fr.
Newcomer Team Offense	Dominique Dafney	Indiana State	FB	Sr.
Newcomer Team Offense	Avante Cox	Southern Illinois	WR	So.
Newcomer Team Offense	Jaxon Janke	South Dakota State	WR	Fr.
Newcomer Team Offense	Kacper Rutkiewicz	Illinois State	WR	Fr.
Newcomer Team Offense	Adam Solomon	Illinois State	OL	Sr.
Newcomer Team Defense	Quinton Hicks	South Dakota State	DE	Fr.
Newcomer Team Defense	Aaron Mends	Illinois State	LB	Sr.
Newcomer Team Defense	Jakari Starling	South Dakota	LB	Fr.
Newcomer Team Defense	Omar Brown	Northern Iowa	DB	Fr.
Newcomer Team Defense	Keawvis Cummings	Indiana State	DB	Sr.
Newcomer Team Defense	Zaire Jones	Youngstown State	DB	Jr.
Newcomer Team Defense	Marquis Smith	Western Illinois	DB	Jr.
Newcomer Team Defense	Diamond Evans	South Dakota State	CB	Fr.
Newcomer Team Defense	Michael Griffin II	South Dakota State	S	Jr.
Newcomer Team Defense	Clayton Isbell	Illinois State	S	Fr.
Newcomer Team Special Teams	Matthew Cook	Northern Iowa	PK	Fr.
Newcomer Team Special Teams	Jack Colquhoun	Southern Illinois	P	Jr.
Newcomer Team Special Teams	Justin Hall	Western Illinois	RS/WR	Fr.

=== National awards ===
On November 25, 2019, STATS Perform released their list of finalists for the Walter Payton Award, Buck Buchanan Award, and the Jerry Rice Award, respectively.

==== Walter Payton Award ====
The Walter Payton Award is given to the best FCS offensive player. Trey Lance (QB) of North Dakota State won the award. Lance was also the first freshman to win the Walter Payton Award in its 33-year history. Here were the other MVFC finalists:

- Cade Johnson (WR - South Dakota State)
- James Robinson (RB - Illinois State)

==== Buck Buchanan Award ====
The Buck Buchanan Award is given to the best FCS defensive player. Here were the MVFC finalists:

- Jeremy Chinn (S - Southern Illinois)
- Christian Rozeboom (LB - South Dakota State)
- Elerson Smith (DL - Northern Iowa)
- Derrek Tuszka (DL - North Dakota State)

==== Jerry Rice Award ====
The Jerry Rice Award is given to the best FCS freshman. Trey Lance (QB) of North Dakota State won the award. Here were the other MVFC finalists:

- Omar Brown (DB - Northern Iowa)
- Javon Williams Jr. (RB - Southern Illinois)

==== FCS Coach of the Year ====
Matt Entz of North Dakota State was the only finalist for FCS Coach of the Year.

Finalists source:
Winners source:

=== All-Americans ===
	AP 1st Team	AP 2nd Team	AP 3rd Team	AFCA 1st Team	AFCA 2nd Team	STATS 1st Team	STATS 2nd Team	STATS 3rd Team	ADA	HERO 1st Team	HERO 2nd Team	HERO 3rd Team
Ben Ellefson, TE, North Dakota State					✓			✓				✓
Bradey Sorenson, LS, South Dakota State											✓	
Cade Johnson, WR, South Dakota State	✓						✓					✓
Chandler Collins, LS, Missouri State							✓					
Christian Rozeboom, LB, South Dakota State		✓		✓		✓				✓		
Derrek Tuszka, DL, North Dakota State	✓				✓	✓				✓		
Dillon Radunz, OL, North Dakota State	✓			✓		✓			✓	✓		
Drew Himmelman, OL, Illinois State	✓			✓		✓						✓
Elerson Smith, DL, Northern Iowa		✓		✓				✓				✓
Isaiah Weston, WR, Northern Iowa												✓
Jabril Cox, LB, North Dakota State			✓				✓			✓		
James Hendricks, DB, North Dakota State											✓	
James Robinson, RB, Illinois State	✓			✓		✓				✓		
Javon Williams Jr., WR, Southern Illinois							✓					
Jeremy Chinn, DB, Southern Illinois		✓			✓	✓				✓		
Jonas Griffith, LB, Indiana State							✓					✓
LaCale London, DL, Western Illinois												✓
Luther Kirk, DB, Illinois State			✓	✓			✓			✓		
Omar Brown, DB, Northern Iowa			✓									
Pierre Strong Jr., RB, South Dakota State			✓								✓	
Trey Lance, QB, North Dakota State		✓			✓		✓		✓	✓		
Zack Johnson, OL, North Dakota State		✓						✓		✓		

== Home attendance ==
Team	Stadium	Capacity	Game 1	Game 2	Game 3	Game 4	Game 5	Game 6	Game 7	Game 8	Game 9	Total	Average	% of Capacity
Illinois State	Hancock Stadium	13,391	11,256	9,891	**13,391**†	8,510	6,705	5,701				55,454	9,242	69.0%
Indiana State	Memorial Stadium	12,764	4,950	4,416	6,216	7,243†	4,642	4,110	3,645			35,222	5,031	39.4%
Missouri State	Robert W. Plaster Stadium	17,500	11,421†	5,784	6,583	5,108	3,352					32,248	6,449	36.9%
North Dakota State	Fargodome	18,700	**18,923**†	18,425	18,178	18,252	17,441	17,844	15,690‡	14,132‡	18,077‡	156,962	17,440	93.3%
Northern Iowa	UNI-Dome	16,324	9,241	8,339	10,137	10,201†	8,442	8,920	3,743‡			59,023	8,431	51.7%
South Dakota	DakotaDome	9,100	5,193	5,077	5,255	4,734	4,561	5,405†				30,225	5,037	55.4%
South Dakota State	Dana J. Dykhouse Stadium	19,340	10,153	11,565	14,269	13,776	**19,371**†	7,211	7,317	4,102‡		87,764	10,970	56.7%
Southern Illinois	Saluki Stadium	15,000	8,983†	5,525	7,670	4,678	5,423					32,279	6,455	43.0%
Western Illinois	Hanson Field	17,128	4,728†	1,594	3,149	2,984	1,728	1,739				15,922	2,653	15.5%
Youngstown State	Stambaugh Stadium	20,630	12,390	15,991†	12,659	12,381	10,437	11,102	9,190			84,150	12,021	58.3%

Bold - Exceed capacity
†Season high

== 2020 NFL draft ==
The following list includes all MVFC players who were drafted in the 2020 NFL draft.

Player	Position	School	Draft Round	Round Pick	Overall Pick	Team	Notes
Jeremy Chinn	S	Southern Illinois	2	32	64	Carolina Panthers	from Kansas City via Seattle
Derrek Tuszka	ILB	North Dakota State	7	40	254	Denver Broncos	Compensatory selection

=== Undrafted free agents ===
Player	Position	School	Team
Kameron Cline	DL	South Dakota	Indianapolis Colts
Dominique Dafney	TE	Indiana State	Indianapolis Colts
James Robinson	RB	Illinois State	Jacksonville Jaguars
Ben Ellefson	TE	North Dakota State	Jacksonville Jaguars
Zack Johnson	OL	North Dakota State	Green Bay Packers
Madre Harper	CB	Southern Illinois	Las Vegas Raiders
Luther Kirk	S	Illinois State	Dallas Cowboys
Luke Sellers	FB	South Dakota State	Detroit Lions
Mikey Daniel	FB	South Dakota State	Atlanta Falcons
Jermiah Braswell	WR	Youngstown State	Arizona Cardinals
Jonas Griffith	LB	Indiana State	San Francisco 49ers

== Head coaches ==
Through January 11, 2020

Team	Head coach	Years at school	Overall record	Record at school	MVFC record	MVFC titles	FCS playoff appearances	FCS playoff record	National Titles
Illinois State	Brock Spack	11	84–50 (.627)	84–50 (.627)	53–35 (.602)	2	5	7–5 (.583)	0
Indiana State	Curt Mallory	3	12–22 (.353)	12–22 (.353)	8–16 (.333)	0	0	0–0 (–)	0
Missouri State	Dave Steckel	5	13–42 (.236)	13–42 (.236)	7–33 (.175)	0	0	0–0 (–)	0
North Dakota State	Matt Entz	1	16–0 (1.000)	16–0 (1.000)	8–0 (1.000)	1	1	4–0 (1.000)	1
Northern Iowa	Mark Farley	19	159–83 (.657)	159–83 (.657)	99–45 (.688)	7	12	16–12 (.571)	0
South Dakota	Bob Nielson (Note: Bob Nielson coached Western Illinois from 2013-15, which included a run in the playoffs that ended in the second round. Nielson also coached Minnesota-Duluth from 1999-2003 and 2008-12, that second stint included five consecutive NCAA Division II playoff appearances highlighted by 2 National Titles. In the first stint at MN-Duluth included his first Division II playoff appearance. Nielson also coached Wisconsin-Eau Claire from 1996-98 that included one NCAA Division III playoff run that ended in the semifinals. Before that, he coached Wartburg from 1991-95, which included two Division III playoff runs as well. His first head coaching job was at Ripon from 1989-90.)	4	207–106–1 (.661)	21–26 (.447)	14–18 (.438)	0	1	1–1 (.500)	2
South Dakota State	John Stiegelmeier (Note: John Stiegelmeier has coached South Dakota State since 1997, when the school was still part of NCAA Division II. While in Division II, the school did not achieve any playoff appearances.)	23	166–102 (.619)	166–102 (.619)	66–30 (.688)	1	9	8–9 (.471)	0
Southern Illinois	Nick Hill	4	17–28 (.378)	17–28 (.378)	10–22 (.313)	0	0	0–0 (–)	0
Western Illinois	Jared Elliott	2	6–17 (.261)	6–17 (.261)	5–13 (.278)	0	0	0–0 (–)	0
Youngstown State	Bo Pelini (Note: Bo Pelini previously coached Nebraska of the FBS for 7 straight seasons between 2008-2014. He also coached the Cornhuskers for one game back in 2003. Pelini's teams at Nebraska finished with a 67-27 overall record and a 39-17 conference record between the Big 12 and the Big Ten, since the Cornhuskers moved to the Big Ten in 2011. While at Nebraska, his teams achieved bowl berths in all seven years he was a full-time head coach, including 3 bowl wins in the Gator and Holiday bowls.)	5	100–55 (.645)	33–28 (.541)	18–22 (.450)	0	1	4–1 (.800)	0
