= 2019 Illinois State Redbirds football team =

American college football season

2019 Illinois State Redbirds football

NCAA Division I Quarterfinal, L 3–9 vs. North Dakota State
- Conference: Missouri Valley Football Conference

Ranking
- STATS: No. 7
- FCS Coaches: No. 7
- Record: 10–5 (5–3 MVFC)
- Head coach: Brock Spack (11th season)
- Offensive coordinator: Kurt Beathard (4th season)
- Defensive coordinator: Travis Niekamp (2nd season)
- MVPs: Ty DeForest; James Robinson
- Captains: Brady Davis; Luther Kirk; JT Bohlken
- Home stadium: Hancock Stadium

2019 Missouri Valley Football Conference standings
	Conf.			Overall
Team	W		L	W		L
No. 1 North Dakota State $^	8	–	0	16	–	0
No. 5 Northern Iowa ^	6	–	2	10	–	5
No. 7 Illinois State ^	5	–	3	10	–	5
No. 10 South Dakota State ^	5	–	3	8	–	5
Southern Illinois	5	–	3	7	–	5
South Dakota	4	–	4	5	–	7
Indiana State	3	–	5	5	–	7
Youngstown State	2	–	6	6	–	6
Missouri State	1	–	7	1	–	10
Western Illinois	1	–	7	1	–	11
$ – Conference champion; ^ – FCS playoff participant; Rankings from STATS Poll

The 2019 Illinois State Redbirds football team represented Illinois State University as a member of the Missouri Valley Football Conference (MVFC) during the 2019 NCAA Division I FCS football season. Led by 11th-year head coach Brock Spack, the Redbirds compiled an overall record of 10–5 with a mark of 5–3 in conference play, placing in a three-way tie for third in the MVFC. Illinois State received an at-large bid to the NCAA Division I Football Championship playoffs, where the Redbirds beat Southeast Missouri State in the first round and Central Arkansas in the second round before losing to the eventual national champion, North Dakota State, in the quarterfinals. The team played home games at Hancock Stadium in Normal, Illinois.

== Preseason ==
=== MVFC poll ===
In the MVFC preseason poll released on July 29, 2019, the Redbirds were predicted to finish in third place.

=== Preseason All–MVFC team ===
The Redbirds had four players selected to the preseason all-MVFC team.

Offense

James Robinson – RB

Drew Himmelman – OL

Defense

Luther Kirk – DB

Devin Taylor – DB

== Schedule ==
Date	Time	Opponent	Rank	Site	TV	Result	Attendance
August 31	6:00 p.m.	at Northern Illinois*	No. 15	Huskie Stadium; DeKalb, IL	ESPN+	L 10–24	14,568
September 7	6:30 p.m.	Morehead State*	No. 16	Hancock Stadium; Normal, IL	NBCS CHIC+/ESPN+	W 42–14	11,256
September 14	2:00 p.m.	at Eastern Illinois*	No. 13	O'Brien Stadium; Charleston, IL (Mid-America Classic)	ESPN+	W 21–3	6,119
September 21	6:30 p.m.	Northern Arizona*	No. 15	Hancock Stadium; Normal, IL	ESPN+	W 40–27	9,891
October 5	12:00 p.m.	No. 1 North Dakota State	No. 10	Hancock Stadium; Normal, IL	NBCS CHIC/ESPN+	L 3–37	13,391
October 12	6:00 p.m.	at Southern Illinois	No. 14	Saluki Stadium; Carbondale, IL	ESPN3	W 21–7	5,525
October 19	1:00 p.m.	at Western Illinois	No. 11	Hanson Field; Macomb, IL	ESPN+	W 28–14	2,984
October 26	2:00 p.m.	Indiana State^{†}	No. 8	Hancock Stadium; Normal, IL	ESPN3	W 24–7	8,510
November 2	12:00 p.m.	No. 9 Northern Iowa	No. 7	Hancock Stadium; Normal, IL	NBCS CHIC	L 10–27	6,705
November 9	2:00 p.m.	at No. 4 South Dakota State	No. 11	Dana J. Dykhouse Stadium; Brookings, SD	ESPN+	W 27–18	7,211
November 16	12:00 p.m.	Missouri State	No. 7	Hancock Stadium; Normal, IL	NBCS CHIC/ESPN+	W 17–12	5,701
November 23	11:00 a.m.	at Youngstown State	No. 7	Stambaugh Stadium; Youngstown, OH	ESPN+	L 3–21	9,190
November 30	1:00 p.m.	at No. 12 Southeast Missouri State*	No. 13	Houck Stadium; Cape Girardeau, MO (NCAA Division I First Round)	ESPN3	W 24–6	3,274
December 7	2:00 p.m.	at No. 9 Central Arkansas*	No. 13	Estes Stadium; Conway, AR (NCAA Division I Second Round)	ESPN3	W 24–14	5,127
December 14	11:00 a.m.	at No. 1 North Dakota State*	No. 13	Fargodome; Fargo, ND (NCAA Division I Quarterfinal)	ESPN	L 3–9	14,132
*Non-conference game; ^{†}Homecoming; Rankings from STATS Poll released prior to the game; All times are in Central time

== Game summaries ==
=== At Northern Illinois ===
	1	2	3	4	Total
No. 15 Redbirds	0	3	0	7	10
Huskies	3	0	7	14	24

=== Morehead State ===
	1	2	3	4	Total
Eagles	0	0	7	7	14
No. 16 Redbirds	21	14	0	7	42

=== At Eastern Illinois ===
	1	2	3	4	Total
No. 13 Redbirds	7	7	7	0	21
Panthers	0	3	0	0	3

=== Northern Arizona ===
	1	2	3	4	Total
Lumberjacks	14	7	0	6	27
No. 15 Redbirds	10	13	14	3	40

=== North Dakota State ===
	1	2	3	4	Total
No. 1 Bison	16	7	7	7	37
No. 10 Redbirds	3	0	0	0	3

=== At Southern Illinois ===
	1	2	3	4	Total
No. 14 Redbirds	7	7	7	0	21
Salukis	0	0	7	0	7

=== At Western Illinois ===
	1	2	3	4	Total
No. 11 Redbirds	7	7	0	14	28
Leathernecks	0	0	7	7	14

=== Indiana State ===
	1	2	3	4	Total
Sycamores	0	7	0	0	7
No. 8 Redbirds	0	7	3	14	24

=== Northern Iowa ===
	1	2	3	4	Total
No. 9 Panthers	7	7	0	13	27
No. 7 Redbirds	0	7	3	0	10

=== At South Dakota State ===
	1	2	3	4	Total
No. 11 Redbirds	7	3	3	14	27
No. 4 Jackrabbits	3	8	7	0	18

=== Missouri State ===
	1	2	3	4	Total
Bears	6	3	0	3	12
No. 7 Redbirds	7	7	0	3	17

=== At Youngstown State ===
	1	2	3	4	Total
No. 7 Redbirds	0	3	0	0	3
Penguins	7	7	0	7	21

=== At Southeast Missouri State—NCAA Division I First Round ===
The Redbirds were selected for the postseason tournament, with a first-round pairing against Southeast Missouri State.

	1	2	3	4	Total
No. 13 Redbirds	14	7	0	3	24
No. 12 Redhawks	3	0	0	3	6

=== At Central Arkansas—NCAA Division I Second Round ===
	1	2	3	4	Total
No. 13 Redbirds	0	21	0	3	24
No. 9 Bears	0	7	0	7	14

=== At North Dakota State—NCAA Division I Quarterfinal ===
	1	2	3	4	Total
No. 13 Redbirds	3	0	0	0	3
No. 1 Bison	16	7	7	7	37

== Ranking movements ==
Ranking movements Legend: ██ Increase in ranking ██ Decrease in ranking
	Week														
Poll	Pre	1	2	3	4	5	6	7	8	9	10	11	12	13	Final
STATS FCS	15	16	13	15	14	10	14	11	8	7	11	7	7	13	7
Coaches	13	16	13	10	8	6	13	10	7	7	12	8	6	14	7
