= 2019 Missouri State Bears football team =

American college football season

2019 Missouri State Bears football
- Conference: Missouri Valley Football Conference
- Record: 1–10 (1–7 MVFC)
- Head coach: Dave Steckel (5th season)
- Offensive coordinator: Justin Kramer (1st season)
- Offensive scheme: Spread
- Defensive coordinator: Marcus Yokeley (4th season)
- Base defense: 4–3
- Captains: McNeese Egbim; Peyton Huslig; Titus Wall
- Home stadium: Robert W. Plaster Stadium

2019 Missouri Valley Football Conference standings
	Conf.			Overall
Team	W		L	W		L
No. 1 North Dakota State $^	8	–	0	16	–	0
No. 5 Northern Iowa ^	6	–	2	10	–	5
No. 7 Illinois State ^	5	–	3	10	–	5
No. 10 South Dakota State ^	5	–	3	8	–	5
Southern Illinois	5	–	3	7	–	5
South Dakota	4	–	4	5	–	7
Indiana State	3	–	5	5	–	7
Youngstown State	2	–	6	6	–	6
Missouri State	1	–	7	1	–	10
Western Illinois	1	–	7	1	–	11
$ – Conference champion; ^ – FCS playoff participant; Rankings from STATS Poll

The 2019 Missouri State Bears football team represented Missouri State University as a member of the Missouri Valley Football Conference (MVFC) during the 2019 NCAA Division I FCS football season. Led by Dave Steckel in his fifth and final season as head coach, the Bears compiled an overall record of 1–10 with a mark of 1–7 in conference play, tying for ninth place at the bottom of the MVFC standings. Missouri State played home games at Robert W. Plaster Stadium in Springfield, Missouri.

On January 10, 2020, Steckel was bought out of his contract with Missouri State.

== Schedule ==
Date	Time	Opponent	Site	TV	Result	Attendance
August 29	8:00 p.m.	at Northern Arizona*	Walkup Skydome; Flagstaff, AZ	Pluto TV	L 23–37	6,891
September 14	7:00 p.m.	at Tulane*	Yulman Stadium; New Orleans, LA	ESPN3	L 6–58	18,846
September 21	2:00 p.m.	Kennesaw State*	Robert W. Plaster Stadium; Springfield, MO	ESPN+	L 24–35	11,421
October 5	3:00 p.m.	at Western Illinois	Hanson Field; Macomb, IL	ESPN+	W 37–31 ^{3OT}	3,149
October 12	2:00 p.m.	South Dakota	Robert W. Plaster Stadium; Springfield, MO	ESPN+	L 10–45	5,784
October 19	2:30 p.m.	at No. 1 North Dakota State	Fargodome; Fargo, ND	ESPN+	L 0–22	18,252
October 26	2:00 p.m.	No. 11 Northern Iowa^{†}	Robert W. Plaster Stadium; Springfield, MO	ESPN+	L 6–29	6,583
November 2	2:00 p.m.	No. 4 South Dakota State	Robert W. Plaster Stadium; Springfield, MO	ESPN3	L 14–35	5,108
November 9	2:00 p.m.	at Southern Illinois	Saluki Stadium; Carbondale, IL	ESPN3	L 14–37	4,678
November 16	12:00 p.m.	at No. 7 Illinois State	Hancock Stadium; Normal, IL	ESPN+	L 12–17	5,701
November 23	2:00 p.m.	Indiana State	Robert W. Plaster Stadium; Springfield, MO	ESPN+	L 24–51	3,352
*Non-conference game; ^{†}Homecoming; Rankings from STATS Poll released prior to the game; All times are in Central time

== Preseason ==
=== MVFC poll ===
In the MVFC preseason poll released on July 29, 2019, the Bears were predicted to finish in tenth place.

=== Preseason All–MVFC team ===
The Bears had one player selected to the preseason all-MVFC team.

Defense

Angelo Garbutt – LB

== Game summaries ==
=== At Northern Arizona ===
	1	2	3	4	Total
Bears	3	3	10	7	23
Lumberjacks	3	17	14	3	37

=== At Tulane ===
	1	2	3	4	Total
Bears	0	6	0	0	6
Green Wave	10	28	13	7	58

=== Kennesaw State ===
	1	2	3	4	Total
No. 7 Owls	0	7	21	7	35
Bears	6	10	0	8	24

=== At Western Illinois ===
	1	2	3	4	OT	2OT	3OT	Total
Bears	0	7	0	14	7	3	6	37
Leathernecks	7	7	0	7	7	3	0	31

=== South Dakota ===
	1	2	3	4	Total
Coyotes	7	24	14	0	45
Bears	7	0	0	3	10

=== At North Dakota State ===
	1	2	3	4	Total
Bears	0	0	0	0	0
No. 1 Bison	8	7	0	7	22

=== Northern Iowa ===
	1	2	3	4	Total
No. 11 Panthers	0	19	10	0	29
Bears	0	0	0	6	6

=== South Dakota State ===
	1	2	3	4	Total
No. 4 Jackrabbits	6	8	7	14	35
Bears	0	0	0	14	14

=== At Southern Illinois ===
	1	2	3	4	Total
Bears	0	0	7	7	14
Salukis	13	17	0	7	37

=== At Illinois State ===
	1	2	3	4	Total
Bears	6	3	0	3	12
No. 7 Redbirds	7	7	0	3	17

=== Indiana State ===
	1	2	3	4	Total
Sycamores	7	14	23	7	51
Bears	0	7	7	10	24
