= 2019 Indiana State Sycamores football team =

American college football season

2019 Indiana State Sycamores football
- Conference: Missouri Valley Football Conference
- Record: 5–7 (3–5 MVFC)
- Head coach: Curt Mallory (3rd season)
- Offensive coordinator: Michael Switzer (1st season)
- Defensive coordinator: Brad Wilson (3rd season)
- Home stadium: Memorial Stadium

2019 Missouri Valley Football Conference standings
	Conf.			Overall
Team	W		L	W		L
No. 1 North Dakota State $^	8	–	0	16	–	0
No. 5 Northern Iowa ^	6	–	2	10	–	5
No. 7 Illinois State ^	5	–	3	10	–	5
No. 10 South Dakota State ^	5	–	3	8	–	5
Southern Illinois	5	–	3	7	–	5
South Dakota	4	–	4	5	–	7
Indiana State	3	–	5	5	–	7
Youngstown State	2	–	6	6	–	6
Missouri State	1	–	7	1	–	10
Western Illinois	1	–	7	1	–	11
$ – Conference champion; ^ – FCS playoff participant; Rankings from STATS Poll

The 2019 Indiana State Sycamores football team represented Indiana State University as a member of the Missouri Valley Football Conference (MVFC) for the 2019 NCAA Division I FCS football season. Led by third -year head coach Curt Mallory, the Sycamores compiled an overall record of 5–7 with a mark of 3–5 in conference play, placing seventh in the MVFC. Indiana State played home games at Memorial Stadium in Terre Haute, Indiana.

== Schedule ==
Date	Time	Opponent	Rank	Site	TV	Result	Attendance	Source
August 31	12:00 p.m.	at Kansas*	No. 16	David Booth Kansas Memorial Stadium; Lawrence, KS	FSN	L 17–24	32,611	
September 7	1:00 p.m.	Dayton*	No. 14	Memorial Stadium; Terre Haute, IN	ESPN+	L 35–42	4,950	
September 14	1:00 p.m.	Eastern Kentucky*		Memorial Stadium; Terre Haute, IN	ESPN+	W 19–7	4,590	
September 21	1:00 p.m.	Eastern Illinois*		Memorial Stadium; Terre Haute, IN	ESPN+	W 16–6	6,216	
October 5	3:00 p.m.	at South Dakota		DakotaDome; Vermillion, SD	ESPN+	L 0–38	5,255	
October 12	1:00 p.m.	Western Illinois^{†}		Memorial Stadium; Terre Haute, IN	ESPN+	W 20–10	7,243	
October 19	1:00 p.m.	No. 3 South Dakota State		Memorial Stadium; Terre Haute, IN	ESPN3	L 23–42	4,642	
October 26	3:00 p.m.	No. 8 Illinois State		Hancock Stadium; Normal, IL	ESPN3	L 7–24	8,510	
November 2	1:00 p.m.	Southern Illinois		Memorial Stadium; Terre Haute, IN	ESPN+	L 14–23	4,110	
November 9	5:00 p.m.	at No. 5 Northern Iowa		UNI-Dome; Cedar Falls, IA	ESPN+	L 9–17	8,442	
November 16	1:00 p.m.	Youngstown State		Memorial Stadium; Terre Haute, IN	ESPN+	W 24–17	3,645	
November 23	3:00 p.m.	at Missouri State		Robert W. Plaster Stadium; Springfield, MO	ESPN+	W 51–24	3,352	
*Non-conference game; ^{†}Homecoming; Rankings from STATS Poll released prior to the game; All times are in Eastern time

== Rankings ==
Ranking movements Legend: ██ Increase in ranking ██ Decrease in ranking
	Week													
Poll	Pre	1	2	3	4	5	6	7	8	9	10	11	12	Final
STATS	16	14												
Coaches	16	15												

== Preseason ==
=== MVFC poll ===
In the MVFC preseason poll released on July 29, 2019, the Sycamores were predicted to finish in fourth place.

=== Preseason All–MVFC team ===
The Sycamores had five players selected to the preseason all-MVFC team.

Offense

Ryan Boyle – QB

Dante Hendrix – WR

Wyatt Wozniak – OL

Jerry Nunez – K

Defense

Jonas Griffith – LB

=== Preseason All–American team ===
The Sycamores had one player, Jonas Griffith – LB, selected to the preseason All-American team. Griffith was also named to the Buck Buchanan Award-watch list.

Ryan Boyle was named to the "College Football Performance Award" Watch List.

== Game summaries ==
=== At Kansas ===
	1	2	3	4	Total
No. 16 Sycamores	0	3	0	14	17
Jayhawks	7	3	6	8	24

=== Dayton ===
	1	2	3	4	Total
Flyers	7	14	14	7	42
No. 14 Sycamores	7	7	7	14	35

=== Eastern Kentucky ===
	1	2	3	4	Total
Colonels	0	0	7	0	7
Sycamores	3	7	0	9	19

=== Eastern Illinois ===
	1	2	3	4	Total
Panthers	0	0	6	0	6
Sycamores	10	3	0	3	16

=== At South Dakota ===
	1	2	3	4	Total
Sycamores	0	0	0	0	0
Coyotes	14	10	14	0	38

=== Western Illinois ===
	1	2	3	4	Total
Leathernecks	0	10	0	0	10
Sycamores	0	0	10	10	20

=== South Dakota State ===
	1	2	3	4	Total
No. 3 Jackrabbits	7	28	0	7	42
Sycamores	7	3	7	6	23

=== At Illinois State ===
	1	2	3	4	Total
Sycamores	0	7	0	0	7
No. 8 Redbirds	0	7	3	14	24

=== Southern Illinois ===
	1	2	3	4	Total
Salukis	7	10	3	3	23
Sycamores	0	7	7	0	14

=== At Northern Iowa ===
	1	2	3	4	Total
Sycamores	3	3	3	0	9
No. 5 Panthers	7	10	0	0	17

=== Youngstown State ===
	1	2	3	4	Total
Penguins	0	10	0	7	17
Sycamores	3	14	7	0	24

=== At Missouri State ===
	1	2	3	4	Total
Sycamores	7	14	23	7	51
Bears	0	7	7	10	24
