= 2019 Western Illinois Leathernecks football team =

American college football season

2019 Western Illinois Leathernecks football
- Conference: Missouri Valley Football Conference
- Record: 1–11 (1–7 MVFC)
- Head coach: Jared Elliott (2nd season)
- Co-offensive coordinators: Ty Howle (2nd season); David Rocco (2nd season)
- Defensive coordinator: Tom Anthony (1st season)
- Home stadium: Hanson Field

2019 Missouri Valley Football Conference standings
	Conf.			Overall
Team	W		L	W		L
No. 1 North Dakota State $^	8	–	0	16	–	0
No. 5 Northern Iowa ^	6	–	2	10	–	5
No. 7 Illinois State ^	5	–	3	10	–	5
No. 10 South Dakota State ^	5	–	3	8	–	5
Southern Illinois	5	–	3	7	–	5
South Dakota	4	–	4	5	–	7
Indiana State	3	–	5	5	–	7
Youngstown State	2	–	6	6	–	6
Missouri State	1	–	7	1	–	10
Western Illinois	1	–	7	1	–	11
$ – Conference champion; ^ – FCS playoff participant; Rankings from STATS Poll

The 2019 Western Illinois Leathernecks football team represented Western Illinois University as member of the Missouri Valley Football Conference (MVFC) during the 2019 NCAA Division I FCS football season. Led by second-year head coach Jared Elliott, the Leathernecks compiled an overall record of 1–11 with a mark of 1–7 in conference play, tying for ninth place at the bottom of the MVFC standings. Western Illinois played home games at Hanson Field in Macomb, Illinois.

== Schedule ==
Date	Time	Opponent	Site	TV	Result	Attendance
August 29	7:00 p.m.	at North Alabama*	Braly Municipal Stadium; Florence, AL	ESPN+	L 17–26	10,567
September 7	3:00 p.m.	at Colorado State*	Canvas Stadium; Fort Collins, CO	AT&T RM	L 13–38	18,231
September 14	3:00 p.m.	No. 10 Montana State*	Hanson Field; Macomb, IL	ESPN+	L 14–23	4,728
September 21	3:00 p.m.	Tennessee Tech*	Hanson Field; Macomb, IL	ESPN3	L 24–38	1,594
October 5	3:00 p.m.	Missouri State	Hanson Field; Macomb, IL	ESPN+	L 31–37 ^{3OT}	3,149
October 12	12:00 p.m.	at Indiana State	Memorial Stadium; Terre Haute, IN	ESPN+	L 10–20	7,243
October 19	1:00 p.m.	No. 11 Illinois State	Hanson Field; Macomb, IL	ESPN+	L 14–28	2,984
October 26	1:00 p.m.	at Youngstown State	Stambaugh Stadium; Youngstown, OH	ESPN+	L 14–59	10,437
November 2	1:00 p.m.	South Dakota	Hanson Field; Macomb, IL	ESPN+	W 38–34	1,728
November 9	2:30 p.m.	at No. 1 North Dakota State	Fargodome; Fargo, ND	ESPN+	L 21–57	17,441
November 16	1:00 p.m.	Southern Illinois	Hanson Field; Macomb, IL	ESPN+	L 21–45	1,739
November 23	1:00 p.m.	at No. 9 Northern Iowa	UNI-Dome; Cedar Falls, IA	ESPN+	L 7–38	8,920
*Non-conference game; Rankings from STATS Poll released prior to the game; All times are in Eastern time

== Rankings ==
Ranking movements Legend: RV = Received votes
	Week													
Poll	Pre	1	2	3	4	5	6	7	8	9	10	11	12	Final
STATS FCS	RV													
Coaches														

== Preseason ==
=== MVFC poll ===
In the MVFC preseason poll released on July 29, 2019, the Leathernecks were predicted to finish in eighth place.

=== Preseason All–MVFC team ===
The Leathernecks had one player selected to the preseason all-MVFC team.

Offense

Clint Ratkovich – FB

== Game summaries ==
=== At North Alabama ===
	1	2	3	4	Total
Leathernecks	0	14	3	0	17
Lions	6	13	7	0	26

=== At Colorado State ===
	1	2	3	4	Total
Leathernecks	3	3	0	7	13
Rams	14	14	7	3	38

=== Montana State ===
	1	2	3	4	Total
No. 10 Bobcats	7	0	10	6	23
Leathernecks	0	7	7	0	14

=== Tennessee Tech ===
	1	2	3	4	Total
Golden Eagles	7	7	10	14	38
Leathernecks	0	3	7	14	24

=== Missouri State ===
	1	2	3	4	OT	2OT	3OT	Total
Bears	0	7	0	14	7	3	6	37
Leathernecks	7	7	0	7	7	3	0	31

=== At Indiana State ===
	1	2	3	4	Total
Leathernecks	0	10	0	0	10
Sycamores	0	0	10	10	20

=== Illinois State ===
	1	2	3	4	Total
No. 11 Redbirds	7	7	0	14	28
Leathernecks	0	0	7	7	14

=== At Youngstown State ===
	1	2	3	4	Total
Leathernecks	7	0	0	7	14
Penguins	28	17	14	0	59

=== South Dakota ===
	1	2	3	4	Total
Coyotes	7	10	3	14	34
Leathernecks	7	0	10	21	38

=== At North Dakota State ===
	1	2	3	4	Total
Leathernecks	0	0	7	14	21
No. 1 Bison	13	14	13	17	57

=== Southern Illinois ===
	1	2	3	4	Total
Salukis	7	3	21	14	45
Leathernecks	0	7	0	14	21

=== At Northern Iowa ===
	1	2	3	4	Total
Leathernecks	7	0	0	0	7
No. 9 Panthers	7	10	14	7	38
