= 2019 South Dakota Coyotes football team =

American college football season

2019 South Dakota Coyotes football
- Conference: Missouri Valley Football Conference
- Record: 5–7 (4–4 MVFC)
- Head coach: Bob Nielson (4th season)
- Offensive coordinator: Ted Schlafke (2nd season)
- Offensive scheme: Pro-style
- Defensive coordinator: Travis Johansen (1st season)
- Base defense: Multiple
- Home stadium: DakotaDome

2019 Missouri Valley Football Conference standings
	Conf.			Overall
Team	W		L	W		L
No. 1 North Dakota State $^	8	–	0	16	–	0
No. 5 Northern Iowa ^	6	–	2	10	–	5
No. 7 Illinois State ^	5	–	3	10	–	5
No. 10 South Dakota State ^	5	–	3	8	–	5
Southern Illinois	5	–	3	7	–	5
South Dakota	4	–	4	5	–	7
Indiana State	3	–	5	5	–	7
Youngstown State	2	–	6	6	–	6
Missouri State	1	–	7	1	–	10
Western Illinois	1	–	7	1	–	11
$ – Conference champion; ^ – FCS playoff participant; Rankings from STATS Poll

The 2019 South Dakota Coyotes football team represented the University of South Dakota in the 2019 NCAA Division I FCS football season. They were led by fourth-year head coach Bob Nielson and played their home games in the DakotaDome. They were a member of the Missouri Valley Football Conference. They finished the season 5–7, 4–4 in MVFC play to finish in sixth place.

== Preseason ==
=== MVFC poll ===
In the MVFC preseason poll released on July 29, 2019, the Coyotes were predicted to finish in sixth place.

=== Preseason All–MVFC team ===
The Coyotes had two players selected to the preseason all-MVFC team.

Offense

Darakai Allen – WR

Defense

Darin Greenfield – DL

== Schedule ==
Date	Time	Opponent	Site	TV	Result	Attendance
August 31	2:00 p.m.	No. 25 Montana*	DakotaDome; Vermillion, SD	ESPN+	L 17–31	5,193
September 7	6:00 p.m.	at No. 4 (FBS) Oklahoma*	Gaylord Family Oklahoma Memorial Stadium; Norman, OK	FSOK PPV	L 14–70	82,181
September 14	2:00 p.m.	Houston Baptist*	DakotaDome; Vermillion, SD	ESPN+	L 52–53	5,077
September 21	3:00 p.m.	at Northern Colorado*	Nottingham Field; Greeley, CO	Pluto TV	W 14–6	5,745
October 5	2:00 p.m.	Indiana State^{†}	DakotaDome; Vermillion, SD	ESPN+	W 38–0	5,255
October 12	2:00 p.m.	at Missouri State	Robert W. Plaster Stadium; Springfield, MO	ESPN+	W 45–10	5,784
October 19	4:00 p.m.	at No. 14 Northern Iowa	UNI-Dome; Cedar Falls, IA	ESPN+	L 27–42	10,201
October 26	4:00 p.m.	Southern Illinois	DakotaDome; Vermillion, SD	ESPN+	L 28–48	4,734
November 2	1:00 p.m.	at Western Illinois	Hanson Field; Macomb, IL	ESPN+	L 34–38	1,728
November 9	2:00 p.m.	Youngstown State	DakotaDome; Vermillion, SD	ESPN+	W 56–21	4,561
November 16	2:30 p.m.	at No. 1 North Dakota State	Fargodome; Fargo, ND	ESPN+	L 14–49	17,844
November 23	2:00 p.m.	No. 5 South Dakota State	DakotaDome; Vermillion, SD (rivalry)	ESPN+	W 24–21	5,405
*Non-conference game; ^{†}Homecoming; Rankings from STATS Poll released prior to the game; All times are in Central time

== Game summaries ==
=== Montana ===
	1	2	3	4	Total
No. 25 Grizzlies	0	17	14	0	31
Coyotes	0	10	7	0	17

=== At Oklahoma ===
	1	2	3	4	Total
Coyotes	0	0	14	0	14
No. 4 (FBS) Sooners	14	14	28	14	70

=== Houston Baptist ===
	1	2	3	4	Total
Huskies	0	17	21	15	53
Coyotes	10	14	14	14	52

=== At Northern Colorado ===
	1	2	3	4	Total
Coyotes	0	7	0	7	14
Bears	0	0	6	0	6

=== Indiana State ===
	1	2	3	4	Total
Sycamores	0	0	0	0	0
Coyotes	14	10	14	0	38

=== At Missouri State ===
	1	2	3	4	Total
Coyotes	10	21	14	0	45
Bears	7	0	0	3	10

=== At Northern Iowa ===
	1	2	3	4	Total
Coyotes	21	3	3	0	27
No. 14 Panthers	14	7	14	7	42

=== Southern Illinois ===
	1	2	3	4	Total
Salukis	7	27	7	7	48
Coyotes	7	0	14	7	28

=== At Western Illinois ===
	1	2	3	4	Total
Coyotes	7	10	3	14	34
Leathernecks	7	0	10	21	38

=== Youngstown State ===
	1	2	3	4	Total
Penguins	7	7	0	7	21
Coyotes	21	14	14	7	56

=== At North Dakota State ===
	1	2	3	4	Total
Coyotes	0	7	0	7	14
No. 1 Bison	14	14	14	7	49

=== South Dakota State ===
	1	2	3	4	Total
No. 5 Jackrabbits	7	0	7	7	21
Coyotes	0	10	14	0	24

== Ranking movements ==
Ranking movements Legend: RV = Received votes
	Week													
Poll	Pre	1	2	3	4	5	6	7	8	9	10	11	12	Final
STATS FCS	RV													
Coaches	RV													
