= 2019 Youngstown State Penguins football team =

American college football season

2019 Youngstown State Penguins football
- Conference: Missouri Valley Football Conference
- Record: 6–6 (2–6 MVFC)
- Head coach: Bo Pelini (5th season)
- Offensive coordinator: Brian Crist (2nd season)
- Offensive scheme: Spread
- Defensive coordinator: Donald D'Alesio (2nd season)
- Base defense: 4–3
- Home stadium: Stambaugh Stadium

2019 Missouri Valley Football Conference standings
	Conf.			Overall
Team	W		L	W		L
No. 1 North Dakota State $^	8	–	0	16	–	0
No. 5 Northern Iowa ^	6	–	2	10	–	5
No. 7 Illinois State ^	5	–	3	10	–	5
No. 10 South Dakota State ^	5	–	3	8	–	5
Southern Illinois	5	–	3	7	–	5
South Dakota	4	–	4	5	–	7
Indiana State	3	–	5	5	–	7
Youngstown State	2	–	6	6	–	6
Missouri State	1	–	7	1	–	10
Western Illinois	1	–	7	1	–	11
$ – Conference champion; ^ – FCS playoff participant; Rankings from STATS Poll

The 2019 Youngstown State Penguins football team represented Youngstown State University in the 2019 NCAA Division I FCS football season. They were led by fifth-year head coach Bo Pelini and played their home games at Stambaugh Stadium. They were a member of the Missouri Valley Football Conference. They finished the season 6–6, 2–6 in MVFC play to finish in eighth place.

== Preseason ==
=== MVFC poll ===
In the MVFC preseason poll released on July 29, 2019, the Penguins were predicted to finish in seventh place.

=== Preseason All–MVFC team ===
The Penguins did not have any players selected to the preseason all-MVFC team.

== Schedule ==
YSU has scheduled 12 games in the 2019 season instead of the 11 normally allowed for FCS programs. Under a standard provision of NCAA rules, all FCS teams are allowed to schedule 12 regular-season games in years in which the period starting with Labor Day weekend and ending with the last Saturday of November contains 14 Saturdays.

Date	Opponent	Rank	Site	TV	Result	Attendance
August 24	vs. Samford*		Cramton Bowl; Montgomery, AL (FCS Kickoff)	ESPN	W 45–22	12,560
September 7	Howard*		Stambaugh Stadium; Youngstown, OH	ESPN+	W 54–28	12,390
September 14	Duquesne*		Stambaugh Stadium; Youngstown, OH	ESPN+	W 34–14	15,991
September 28	Robert Morris*	No. 22	Stambaugh Stadium; Youngstown, OH	ESPN+	W 45–10	12,659
October 5	at No. 13 Northern Iowa	No. 18	UNI-Dome; Cedar Falls, IA	ESPN3	L 14–21	10,137
October 12	No. 3 South Dakota State^{†}	No. 19	Stambaugh Stadium; Youngstown, OH	ESPN+	L 28–38	12,381
October 19	at Southern Illinois	No. 19	Saluki Stadium; Carbondale, IL	ESPN+	L 10–35	7,670
October 26	Western Illinois		Stambaugh Stadium; Youngstown, OH	ESPN+	W 59–14	10,437
November 2	No. 1 North Dakota State		Stambaugh Stadium; Youngstown, OH	ESPN+	L 17–56	11,102
November 9	at South Dakota		DakotaDome; Vermillion, SD	ESPN+	L 21–56	4,561
November 16	at Indiana State		Memorial Stadium; Terre Haute, IN	ESPN+	L 17–24	3,645
November 23	No. 7 Illinois State		Stambaugh Stadium; Youngstown, OH	ESPN+	W 21–3	9,190
*Non-conference game; ^{†}Homecoming; Rankings from STATS Poll released prior to the game

== Game summaries ==
=== Vs. Samford ===
	1	2	3	4	Total
Penguins	14	10	0	21	45
Bulldogs	7	0	0	15	22

Scoring summary

Quarter	Time	Drive			Team	Scoring information	Score	
Quarter	Time	Plays	Yards	TOP	Team	Scoring information	YSU	SAM
1	9:09	5	85	1:22	SAM	Robert Adams 55-yard touchdown reception from Liam Welch, Mitchell Fineran kick good	0	7
1	2:12	13	83	6:57	YSU	Samuel St. Surin 16-yard touchdown reception from Nathan Mays, Colton McFadden kick good	7	7
1	1:29				YSU	Fumble recovery returned 25 yards for touchdown by Cash Mitchell, Colton McFadden kick good	14	7
2	10:57	8	41	3:55	YSU	43-yard field goal by Colton McFadden	17	7
2	0:36	12	90	2:46	YSU	Josh Burgett 4-yard touchdown reception from Nathan Mays, Colton McFadden kick good	24	7
4	14:29	8	63	3:45	YSU	Braxton Chapman 1-yard touchdown run, Colton McFadden kick good	31	7
4	13:37	3	70	0:52	SAM	Montrell Washington 64-yard touchdown reception from Chris Oladokun, 2-point run good	31	15
4	5:16	13	75	8:21	YSU	Braxton Champan 1-yard touchdown run, Colton McFadden kick good	38	15
4	3:17	6	36	1:59	SAM	Chris Oladokun 10-yard touchdown run, Mitchell Finehan kick good	38	22
4	2:16	3	44	1:01	YSU	Christian Turner 3-yard touchdown run, Colton McFadden kick good	45	22
"TOP" = time of possession. For other American football terms, see Glossary of American football.							45	22

=== Howard ===
	1	2	3	4	Total
Bison	14	0	7	7	28
Penguins	6	21	20	7	54

=== Duquesne ===
	1	2	3	4	Total
Dukes	0	7	0	7	14
Penguins	7	14	6	7	34

=== Robert Morris ===
	1	2	3	4	Total
Colonials	7	0	3	0	10
No. 22 Penguins	7	24	7	7	45

=== At Northern Iowa ===
	1	2	3	4	Total
No. 18 Penguins	0	7	7	0	14
No. 13 Panthers	7	14	0	0	21

=== South Dakota State ===
	1	2	3	4	Total
No. 3 Jackrabbits	3	0	13	22	38
No. 19 Penguins	7	7	7	7	28

=== At Southern Illinois ===
	1	2	3	4	Total
No. 19 Penguins	3	7	0	0	10
Salukis	14	14	7	0	35

=== Western Illinois ===
	1	2	3	4	Total
Leathernecks	7	0	0	7	14
Penguins	28	17	14	0	59

=== North Dakota State ===
	1	2	3	4	Total
No. 1 Bison	21	21	7	7	56
Penguins	0	7	3	7	17

=== At South Dakota ===
	1	2	3	4	Total
Penguins	7	7	0	7	21
Coyotes	21	14	14	7	56

=== At Indiana State ===
	1	2	3	4	Total
Penguins	0	10	0	7	17
Sycamores	3	14	7	0	24

=== Illinois State ===
	1	2	3	4	Total
No. 7 Redbirds	0	3	0	0	3
Penguins	7	7	0	7	21

== Ranking movements ==
Ranking movements Legend: ██ Increase in ranking ██ Decrease in ranking — = Not ranked RV = Received votes
	Week														
Poll	Pre	1	2	3	4	5	6	7	8	9	10	11	12	13	Final
STATS FCS	RV	RV	RV	24	22	18	19	19	RV	RV	RV	—	—	—	
Coaches	—	RV	RV	21	20	17	17	18	RV	RV	—	—	—	—	
