= 2019 Southern Illinois Salukis football team =

American college football season

2019 Southern Illinois Salukis football
- Conference: Missouri Valley Football Conference

Ranking
- FCS Coaches: No. T–25
- Record: 7–5 (5–3 MVFC)
- Head coach: Nick Hill (4th season)
- Offensive coordinator: Blake Rolan (1st season)
- Defensive coordinator: Jason Petrino (1st season)
- Home stadium: Saluki Stadium

2019 Missouri Valley Football Conference standings
	Conf.			Overall
Team	W		L	W		L
No. 1 North Dakota State $^	8	–	0	16	–	0
No. 5 Northern Iowa ^	6	–	2	10	–	5
No. 7 Illinois State ^	5	–	3	10	–	5
No. 10 South Dakota State ^	5	–	3	8	–	5
Southern Illinois	5	–	3	7	–	5
South Dakota	4	–	4	5	–	7
Indiana State	3	–	5	5	–	7
Youngstown State	2	–	6	6	–	6
Missouri State	1	–	7	1	–	10
Western Illinois	1	–	7	1	–	11
$ – Conference champion; ^ – FCS playoff participant; Rankings from STATS Poll

The 2019 Southern Illinois Salukis football team represented Southern Illinois University Carbondale as a member of the Missouri Valley Football Conference (MVFC) during the 2019 NCAA Division I FCS football season. Led by fourth-year head coach Nick Hill, the Salukis compiled an overall record of 7–5 with a mark of 5–3 in conference play, placing in a three-way tie for third in the MVFC. Southern Illinois played home games at Saluki Stadium in Carbondale, Illinois.

== Preseason ==
=== MVFC poll ===
In the MVFC preseason poll released on July 29, 2019, the Salukis were predicted to finish in ninth place.

=== Preseason All–MVFC team ===
The Salukis had four players selected to the preseason all-MVFC team.

Offense

D.J. Davis – RB

Defense

Anthony Knighton – DL

Jeremy Chinn – DB

Je'Quan Burton – RS

== Schedule ==
Date	Time	Opponent	Site	TV	Result	Attendance
August 29	6:30 p.m.	at No. 17 Southeast Missouri State*	Houck Stadium; Cape Girardeau, MO	ESPN+	L 26–44	8,312
September 7	2:30 p.m.	at UMass*	McGuirk Alumni Stadium; Amherst, MA	FloSports	W 45–20	10,524
September 14	6:00 p.m.	UT Martin*	Saluki Stadium; Carbondale, IL	ESPN+	W 28–14	8,983
September 21	6:00 p.m.	at Arkansas State*	Centennial Bank Stadium; Jonesboro, AR	ESPN3	L 28–41	24,176
October 5	2:00 p.m.	at No. 3 South Dakota State	Dana J. Dykhouse Stadium; Brookings, SD	ESPN+	L 10–28	13,776
October 12	6:00 p.m.	No. 14 Illinois State	Saluki Stadium; Carbondale, IL	ESPN+	L 7–21	5,525
October 19	2:00 p.m.	No. 19 Youngstown State^{†}	Saluki Stadium; Carbondale, IL	ESPN+	W 35–10	7,670
October 26	4:00 p.m.	at South Dakota	DakotaDome; Vermillion, SD	ESPN+	W 48–28	4,734
November 2	12:00 p.m.	at Indiana State	Memorial Stadium; Terre Haute, IN	ESPN+	W 23–14	4,110
November 9	2:00 p.m.	Missouri State	Saluki Stadium; Carbondale, IL	ESPN+	W 37–14	4,678
November 16	1:00 p.m.	at Western Illinois	Hanson Field; Macomb, IL	ESPN+	W 45–21	1,739
November 23	2:00 p.m.	No. 1 North Dakota State	Saluki Stadium; Carbondale, IL	ESPN+	L 7–21	5,423
*Non-conference game; ^{†}Homecoming; Rankings from STATS Poll released prior to the game; All times are in Central time

== Game summaries ==
=== At Southeast Missouri State ===
	1	2	3	4	Total
Salukis	7	7	0	12	26
No. 17 Redhawks	0	20	17	7	44

=== At UMass ===
	1	2	3	4	Total
Salukis	0	17	14	14	45
Minutemen	6	7	0	7	20

=== UT Martin ===
	1	2	3	4	Total
Skyhawks	7	7	0	0	14
Salukis	0	14	14	0	28

=== At Arkansas State ===
	1	2	3	4	Total
Salukis	14	0	14	0	28
Red Wolves	14	17	7	3	41

=== At South Dakota State ===
	1	2	3	4	Total
Salukis	3	7	0	0	10
No. 3 Jackrabbits	6	3	12	7	28

=== Illinois State ===
	1	2	3	4	Total
No. 14 Redbirds	7	7	7	0	21
Salukis	0	0	7	0	7

=== Youngstown State ===
	1	2	3	4	Total
No. 19 Penguins	3	7	0	0	10
Salukis	14	14	7	0	35

=== At South Dakota ===
	1	2	3	4	Total
Salukis	7	27	7	7	48
Coyotes	7	0	14	7	28

=== At Indiana State ===
	1	2	3	4	Total
Salukis	7	10	3	3	23
Sycamores	0	7	7	0	14

=== Missouri State ===
	1	2	3	4	Total
Bears	0	0	7	7	14
Salukis	13	17	0	7	37

=== At Western Illinois ===
	1	2	3	4	Total
Salukis	7	3	21	14	45
Leathernecks	0	7	0	14	21

=== North Dakota State ===
	1	2	3	4	Total
No. 1 Bison	7	0	7	7	21
Salukis	0	7	0	0	7

== Postseason ==
=== NFL draft ===
The following Saluki was drafted into the National Football League following the season.

Round	Pick	Player	Position	NFL team
2	64	Jeremy Chinn	Safety	Carolina Panthers
