= 2019 Northern Iowa Panthers football team =

American college football season

2019 Northern Iowa Panthers football

NCAA Division I Quarterfinal, L 0–17 at James Madison
- Conference: Missouri Valley Football Conference

Ranking
- STATS: No. 5
- FCS Coaches: No. 5
- Record: 10–5 (6–2 MVFC)
- Head coach: Mark Farley (19th season)
- Offensive coordinator: Ryan Mahaffey (2nd season)
- Defensive coordinator: Jeremiah Johnson (7th season)
- Home stadium: UNI-Dome

2019 Missouri Valley Football Conference standings
	Conf.			Overall
Team	W		L	W		L
No. 1 North Dakota State $^	8	–	0	16	–	0
No. 5 Northern Iowa ^	6	–	2	10	–	5
No. 7 Illinois State ^	5	–	3	10	–	5
No. 10 South Dakota State ^	5	–	3	8	–	5
Southern Illinois	5	–	3	7	–	5
South Dakota	4	–	4	5	–	7
Indiana State	3	–	5	5	–	7
Youngstown State	2	–	6	6	–	6
Missouri State	1	–	7	1	–	10
Western Illinois	1	–	7	1	–	11
$ – Conference champion; ^ – FCS playoff participant; Rankings from STATS Poll

The 2019 Northern Iowa Panthers football team represented the University of Northern Iowa as a member of the Missouri Valley Football Conference (MVFC) during the 2019 NCAA Division I FCS football season. Led by 19th-year head coach Mark Farley, the Panthers compiled an overall record of 10–5 with a mark of 6–2 in conference play, placing second in the MVFC. Northern Iowa received an at-large bid to NCAA Division I Football Championship playoffs, where the Panthers defeated San Diego in the first round and South Dakota State in second round before losing to the national runner-up James Madison, in the quarterfinals. The team played home games at the UNI-Dome in Cedar Falls, Iowa.

== Schedule ==
Date	Time	Opponent	Rank	Site	TV	Result	Attendance
August 31	11:00 a.m.	at No. 21 FBS Iowa State*	No. 18	Jack Trice Stadium; Ames, IA	FS1	L 26–29 ^{3OT}	61,500
September 7	4:00 p.m.	Southern Utah*	No. 11	UNI-Dome; Cedar Falls, IA	PSN (Note: Panther Sports Network involves these channels (CFU Ch. 15/HD415; KCRG-TV Ch. 9.2; WHO-DT Ch. 13.2; KGCW Ch. 26, (NBC Sports Chicago or NBC Sports Chicago Plus)), ESPN3	W 34–14	9,241
September 21	4:00 p.m.	Idaho State*	No. 9	UNI-Dome; Cedar Falls, IA	PSN, ESPN+	W 13–6	8,339
September 28	7:00 p.m.	at No. 5 Weber State*	No. 9	Stewart Stadium; Ogden, UT	Pluto TV	L 17–29	6,582
October 5	4:00 p.m.	No. 18 Youngstown State^{†}	No. 13	UNI-Dome; Cedar Falls, IA	PSN, ESPN3	W 21–14	10,137
October 12	1:00 p.m.	at No. 1 North Dakota State	No. 10	Fargodome; Fargo, ND	ESPN+	L 14–46	18,178
October 19	4:00 p.m.	South Dakota	No. 14	UNI-Dome; Cedar Falls, IA	PSN, ESPN+	W 42–27	10,201
October 26	2:00 p.m.	at Missouri State	No. 11	Robert W. Plaster Stadium; Springfield, MO	ESPN+	W 29–6	6,583
November 2	12:00 p.m.	at No. 7 Illinois State	No. 9	Hancock Stadium; Normal, IL	NBCCH, ESPN+	W 27–10	6,705
November 9	4:00 p.m.	Indiana State	No. 5	UNI-Dome; Cedar Falls, IA	PSN, ESPN+	W 17–9	8,442
November 16	2:00 p.m.	at No. 8 South Dakota State	No. 4	Dana J. Dykhouse Stadium; Brookings, SD	ESPN3	L 7–38	7,317
November 23	1:00 p.m.	Western Illinois	No. 9	UNI-Dome; Cedar Falls, IA	ESPN3	W 38–7	8,920
November 30	1:00 p.m.	San Diego*	No. 6	UNI-Dome; Cedar Falls, IA (NCAA Division I First Round)	ESPN3	W 17–3	3,743
December 7	1:00 p.m.	at No. 10 South Dakota State*	No. 6	Dana J. Dykhouse Stadium; Brookings, SD (NCAA Division I Second Round)	ESPN3	W 13–10	4,102
December 13	6:00 p.m.	at No. 2 James Madison*	No. 6	Bridgeforth Stadium; Harrisonburg, VA (NCAA Division I Quarterfinal)	ESPN2	L 0–17	8,741
*Non-conference game; ^{†}Homecoming; Rankings from STATS Poll released prior to the game; All times are in Central time

== Rankings ==
Ranking movements Legend: ██ Increase in ranking ██ Decrease in ranking
	Week														
Poll	Pre	1	2	3	4	5	6	7	8	9	10	11	12	13	Final
STATS FCS	18	11	11	9	9	13	10	14	11	9	5	4	9	6	5
Coaches	20	12	10	8	7	13	10	15	12	10	7	5	10	6	5

== Preseason ==
=== MVFC poll ===
In the MVFC preseason poll released on July 29, 2019, the Panthers were predicted to finish in fifth place.

=== Preseason All–MVFC team ===
The Panthers had three players selected to the preseason all-MVFC team.

Offense

Briley Moore – TE

Jackson Scott-Brown – OL

Defense

Xavior Williams – DB

== Game summaries ==
=== At Iowa State ===
	1	2	3	4	OT	2OT	3OT	Total
No. 18 Panthers	0	0	13	0	3	7	3	26
No. 21 (FBS) Cyclones	3	0	7	3	3	7	6	29

=== Southern Utah ===
	1	2	3	4	Total
Thunderbirds	0	0	7	7	14
No. 11 Panthers	7	17	10	0	34

=== Idaho State ===
	1	2	3	4	Total
Bengals	3	3	0	0	6
No. 9 Panthers	0	3	0	10	13

=== At Weber State ===
	1	2	3	4	Total
No. 9 Panthers	3	7	0	7	17
No. 5 Wildcats	20	7	2	0	29

=== Youngstown State ===
	1	2	3	4	Total
No. 18 Penguins	0	7	7	0	14
No. 13 Panthers	7	14	0	0	21

=== At North Dakota State ===
	1	2	3	4	Total
No. 10 Panthers	0	14	0	0	14
No. 1 Bison	15	3	7	21	46

=== South Dakota ===
	1	2	3	4	Total
Coyotes	21	3	3	0	27
No. 14 Panthers	14	7	14	7	42

=== At Missouri State ===
	1	2	3	4	Total
No. 11 Panthers	0	19	10	0	29
Bears	0	0	0	6	6

=== At Illinois State ===
	1	2	3	4	Total
No. 9 Panthers	7	7	0	13	27
No. 7 Redbirds	0	7	3	0	10

=== Indiana State ===
	1	2	3	4	Total
Sycamores	3	3	3	0	9
No. 5 Panthers	7	10	0	0	17

=== At South Dakota State ===
	1	2	3	4	Total
No. 4 Panthers	0	0	7	0	7
No. 8 Jackrabbits	0	7	10	21	38

=== Western Illinois ===
	1	2	3	4	Total
Leathernecks	7	0	0	0	7
No. 9 Panthers	7	10	14	7	38

=== San Diego—NCAA Division I First Round ===
	1	2	3	4	Total
Toreros	0	3	0	0	3
No. 6 Panthers	7	0	0	10	17

The Panthers were selected for the postseason tournament, with a first-round pairing against San Diego.

=== At South Dakota State—NCAA Division I Second Round ===
	1	2	3	4	Total
No. 6 Panthers	0	3	7	3	13
No. 10 Jackrabbits	10	0	0	0	10

=== At James Madison—NCAA Division I Quarterfinal ===
	1	2	3	4	Total
No. 6 Panthers	0	0	0	0	0
No. 2 Dukes	7	3	0	7	17
