= 2019 South Dakota State Jackrabbits football team =

American college football season

2019 South Dakota State Jackrabbits football

NCAA Division Second Round, L 10–13 vs. Northern Iowa
- Conference: Missouri Valley Football Conference

Ranking
- STATS: No. 10
- FCS Coaches: No. 12
- Record: 8–5 (5–3 MVFC)
- Head coach: John Stiegelmeier (23rd season)
- Offensive coordinator: Jason Eck (1st season)
- Co-defensive coordinators: Brian Bergstrom (1st season); Jimmy Rogers (1st season)
- Home stadium: Dana J. Dykhouse Stadium

2019 Missouri Valley Football Conference standings
	Conf.			Overall
Team	W		L	W		L
No. 1 North Dakota State $^	8	–	0	16	–	0
No. 5 Northern Iowa ^	6	–	2	10	–	5
No. 7 Illinois State ^	5	–	3	10	–	5
No. 10 South Dakota State ^	5	–	3	8	–	5
Southern Illinois	5	–	3	7	–	5
South Dakota	4	–	4	5	–	7
Indiana State	3	–	5	5	–	7
Youngstown State	2	–	6	6	–	6
Missouri State	1	–	7	1	–	10
Western Illinois	1	–	7	1	–	11
$ – Conference champion; ^ – FCS playoff participant; Rankings from STATS Poll

The 2019 South Dakota State Jackrabbits football team represented South Dakota State University as a member of the Missouri Valley Football Conference (MVFC) during the 2019 NCAA Division I FCS football season. Led by 23rd-year head coach John Stiegelmeier, the Jackrabbits compiled an overall record of 8–5 with a mark of 5–3 in conference play, placing in a three-way tie for third in the MVFC. South Dakota State received an at-large bid to the NCAA Division I Football Championship playoffs, where, after a first round bye, the Jackrabbits lost to Northern Iowa in the second round. The team played home games on campus at Dana J. Dykhouse Stadium in Brookings, South Dakota.

== Preseason ==
=== MVFC poll ===
In the MVFC preseason poll released on July 29, 2019, the Jackrabbits were predicted to finish in second place.

=== Preseason All–MVFC team ===
The Jackrabbits had five players selected to the preseason all-MVFC team.

Offense

Pierre Strong Jr. – RB

Cade Johnson – WR

Bradey Sorenson – LS

Defense

Ryan Earith – DL

Christian Rozeboom – LB

== Schedule ==
Date	Time	Opponent	Rank	Site	TV	Result	Attendance
August 29	9:00 p.m.	at Minnesota*	No. 3	TCF Bank Stadium; Minneapolis, MN	FS1	L 21–28	49,112
September 7	6:00 p.m.	LIU*	No. 3	Dana J. Dykhouse Stadium; Brookings, SD	ESPN3	W 38–3	10,153
September 14	1:00 p.m.	Drake*	No. 3	Dana J. Dykhouse Stadium; Brookings, SD	Midco	W 38–10	11,565
September 21	7:00 p.m.	Southern Utah*	No. 3	Dana J. Dykhouse Stadium; Brookings, SD	Midco	W 43–7	14,269
October 5	2:00 p.m.	Southern Illinois	No. 3	Dana J. Dykhouse Stadium; Brookings, SD	ESPN+	W 28–10	13,776
October 12	5:00 p.m.	at No. 19 Youngstown State	No. 3	Stambaugh Stadium; Youngstown, OH	ESPN+	W 38–28	12,381
October 19	12:00 p.m.	at Indiana State	No. 3	Memorial Stadium; Terre Haute, IN	ESPN3	W 42–23	4,642
October 26	2:00 p.m.	No. 1 North Dakota State	No. 3	Dana J. Dykhouse Stadium; Brookings, SD (Dakota Marker, College GameDay)	ESPN+, Midco	L 16–23	19,371
November 2	2:00 p.m.	at Missouri State	No. 4	Robert W. Plaster Stadium; Springfield, MO	ESPN3	W 35–14	5,108
November 9	2:00 p.m.	No. 11 Illinois State	No. 4	Dana J. Dykhouse Stadium; Brookings, SD	ESPN+	L 18–27	7,211
November 16	2:00 p.m.	No. 4 Northern Iowa	No. 8	Dana J. Dykhouse Stadium; Brookings, SD	ESPN3	W 38–7	7,317
November 23	2:00 p.m.	at South Dakota	No. 5	DakotaDome; Vermillion, SD (rivalry)	ESPN+, Midco	L 21–24	5,405
December 7	1:00 p.m.	No. 6 Northern Iowa*	No. 10	Dana J. Dykhouse Stadium; Brookings, SD (NCAA Division I Second Round)	ESPN3	L 10–13	4,102
*Non-conference game; Rankings from STATS Poll released prior to the game; All times are in Central time

== Game summaries ==
=== At Minnesota ===
	1	2	3	4	Total
No. 3 Jackrabbits	0	7	14	0	21
Golden Gophers	0	13	7	8	28

=== LIU ===
	1	2	3	4	Total
Sharks	0	3	0	0	3
No. 3 Jackrabbits	7	14	14	3	38

=== Drake ===
	1	2	3	4	Total
Bulldogs	0	3	0	7	10
No. 3 Jackrabbits	10	7	14	7	38

=== Southern Utah ===
	1	2	3	4	Total
Thunderbirds	0	7	0	0	7
No. 3 Jackrabbits	7	14	15	7	43

=== Southern Illinois ===
	1	2	3	4	Total
Salukis	3	7	0	0	10
No. 3 Jackrabbits	6	3	12	7	28

=== At Youngstown State ===
	1	2	3	4	Total
No. 3 Jackrabbits	3	0	13	22	38
No. 19 Penguins	7	7	7	7	28

=== At Indiana State ===
	1	2	3	4	Total
No. 3 Jackrabbits	7	28	0	7	42
Sycamores	7	3	7	6	23

=== North Dakota State ===
	1	2	3	4	Total
No. 1 Bison	0	3	13	7	23
No. 3 Jackrabbits	6	0	3	7	16

=== At Missouri State ===
	1	2	3	4	Total
No. 4 Jackrabbits	6	8	7	14	35
Bears	0	0	0	14	14

=== Illinois State ===
	1	2	3	4	Total
No. 11 Redbirds	7	3	3	14	27
No. 4 Jackrabbits	3	8	7	0	18

=== Northern Iowa ===
	1	2	3	4	Total
No. 4 Panthers	0	0	7	0	7
No. 8 Jackrabbits	0	7	10	21	38

=== At South Dakota ===
	1	2	3	4	Total
No. 5 Jackrabbits	7	0	7	7	21
Coyotes	0	10	14	0	24

== FCS Playoffs ==
The Jackrabbits entered the postseason tournament as the number seven seed, with a first-round bye.

=== Northern Iowa–Second Round ===
	1	2	3	4	Total
No. 6 Panthers	0	3	7	3	13
No. 10 Jackrabbits	10	0	0	0	10

== Ranking movements ==
Ranking movements Legend: ██ Increase in ranking ██ Decrease in ranking ( ) = First-place votes
	Week														
Poll	Pre	1	2	3	4	5	6	7	8	9	10	11	12	13	Final
STATS FCS	3 (1)	3	3	3	3	3	3	3	3	4	4	8	5	10	10
Coaches	4	3	3	3	3	3	3	3	3	5	4	9	5	12	12
