= Dave Steckel (American football) =

American football player and coach

Current position
- Title: Senior Defensive Analyst
- Team: Purdue
- Conference: Big Ten

Playing career
- 1979–1982: Kutztown
- Position: Offensive lineman

Coaching career (HC unless noted)
- 1982–1983: Miami (OH) (GA)
- 1984: Ball State (DL)
- 1985: Minnesota (GA)
- 1986–1987: Dickinson (AHC/OC)
- 1988–1991: Lehigh (STC/LB)
- 1992–1995: Toledo (DL)
- 1996–1998: Rutgers (DL)
- 1999–2000: Rutgers (LB)
- 2001–2008: Missouri (LB)
- 2009–2010: Missouri (DC/LB)
- 2011–2014: Missouri (AHC/DC/LB)
- 2015–2019: Missouri State
- 2023: St. Louis BattleHawks (LB)
- 2026–present: Purdue (DA)

Head coaching record
- Overall: 13–42 (college)

Dave Steckel is an American football coach and former player who is currently a Senior Defensive Analyst for Purdue University. He was recently the head coach at Missouri State University. Prior to that, he spent 14 seasons on the staff at the University of Missouri. His other coaching stops include Miami University of Ohio, Ball State University, the University of Minnesota, Dickinson College, Lehigh University, the University of Toledo, and Rutgers University.

== Early life and education ==
A native of Fullerton, Pennsylvania, Steckel enlisted in the United States Marine Corps after graduating from high school, and served from 1975 to 1978. He is the younger brother of Les Steckel, a former NFL coach. Steckel played four seasons as an offensive lineman at Kutztown University in Kutztown, Pennsylvania.

== Career ==
Steckel's began his coaching career in 1982, shortly after his playing career at Kutztown University ended. He was a graduate assistant coach at Miami (OH). Two years later, in 1984, he was hired as defensive line coach for Ball State.

Steckel spent the 1985 season as a graduate assistant at Minnesota.

From 1986 to 1987, Steckel was the associate head coach and offensive coordinator at Dickinson College in Dickinson, Pennsylvania. He was then joined the coaching staff at Lehigh University, in Bethlehem, Pennsylvania, where he served as the special teams coordinator and linebacker coach from 1988 to 1991.

In 1992, Steckel joined Gary Pinkel’s staff at Toledo coaching the defensive line, and served in that capacity for three seasons through 1995.

Steckel then joined the coaching staff at Rutgers for five seasons. He coached the defensive line from 1996 to 1998 and the linebackers in 1999 and 2000.

In 2001, Steckel reunited with Gary Pinkel at Missouri, joining the Tigers as the linebackers coach. Steckel would spend the next 14 years tutoring the Tigers linebackers, was promoted to defensive coordinator prior to the 2009 season, and was promoted to associate head coach prior to the 2011 season.

=== Missouri State ===
On December 14, 2014, Steckel was named the 20th head football coach at Missouri State.

On January 10, 2020, Steckel was bought out of his contract with Missouri State.

=== St. Louis BattleHawks ===
Steckle was hired by the St. Louis BattleHawks on September 13, 2022. He left the Team on March 2, 2023.

== Personal life ==
Steckel and his wife, Mary Beth, have one daughter, Amanda.

== Head coaching record ==
=== College ===
Year	Team	Overall	Conference	Standing	Bowl/playoffs
Missouri State Bears (Missouri Valley Football Conference) (2015–2019)
2015	Missouri State	1–10	0–8	10th	
2016	Missouri State	4–7	2–6	T–8th	
2017	Missouri State	3–8	2–6	T–8th	
2018	Missouri State	4–7	2–6	9th	
2019	Missouri State	1–10	1–7	T–9th	
Missouri State:		13–42	7–33		
Total:		13–42			
