= James Robinson (running back) =

American football player (born 1998)

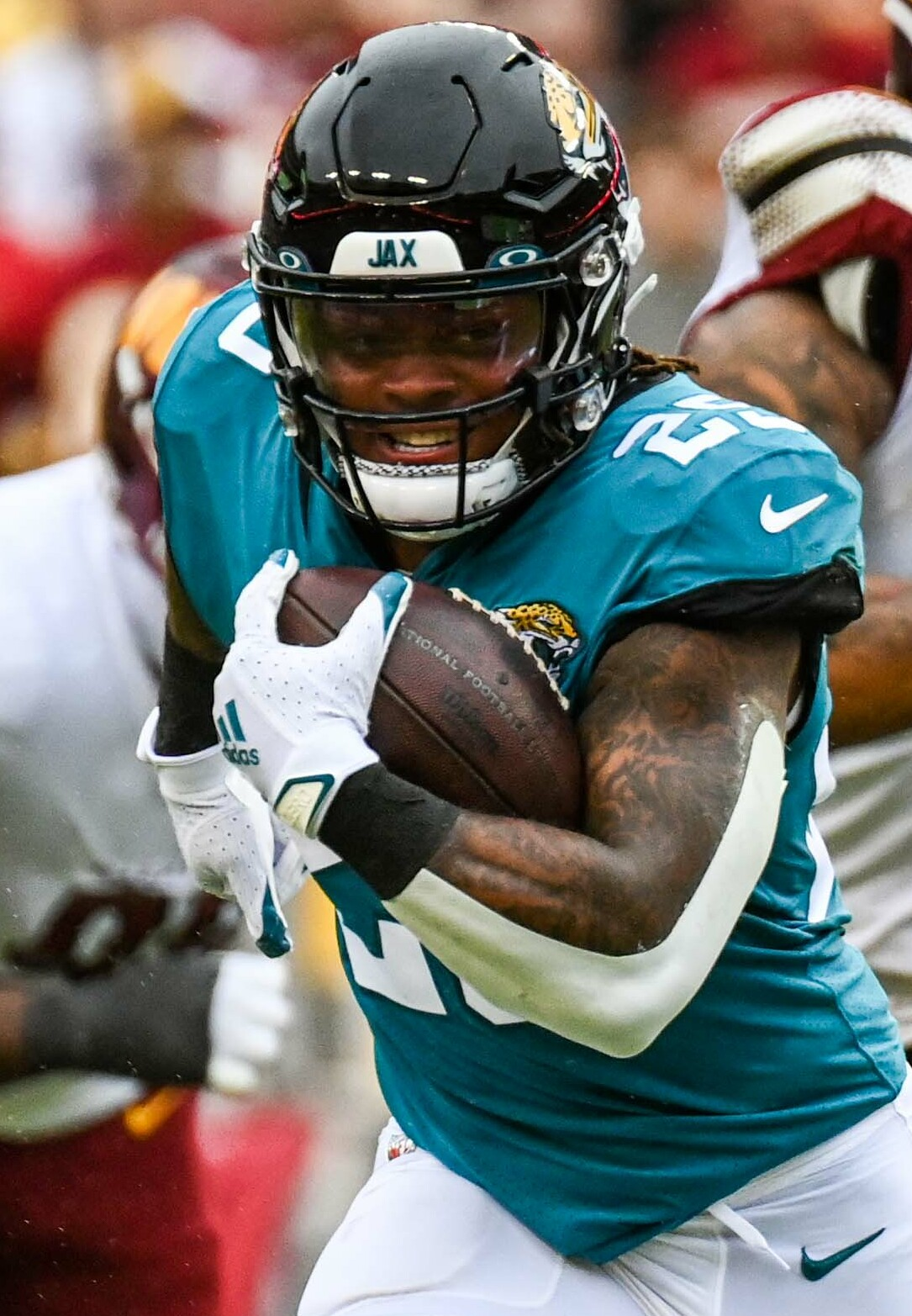
- Robinson with the Jacksonville Jaguars in 2022

No. 30 – Louisville Kings
- Position: Running back
- Roster status: Active

Personal information
- Born: August 9, 1998 (age 28); Rockford, Illinois, U.S.
- Listed height: 5 ft 9 in (1.75 m)
- Listed weight: 220 lb (100 kg)

Career information
- High school: Rockford Lutheran
- College: Illinois State (2016–2019)
- NFL draft: 2020: undrafted

Career history
- Jacksonville Jaguars (2020–2022); New York Jets (2022); New England Patriots (2023)*; New York Giants (2023)*; Green Bay Packers (2023); New Orleans Saints (2023)*; Louisville Kings (2026–present)
- * Offseason or practice squad member only

Awards and highlights
- UFL champion (2026); PFWA All-Rookie Team (2020); First-team FCS All-American (2019); 3× First-team All-MVFC (2017–2019)

Career NFL statistics
- Rushing yards: 2,264
- Rushing average: 4.4
- Rushing touchdowns: 18
- Receptions: 92
- Receiving yards: 615
- Receiving touchdowns: 5
- Stats at Pro Football Reference

James Robinson (born August 9, 1998) is an American professional football running back for the Louisville Kings of the United Football League (UFL). He played college football for the Illinois State Redbirds and signed with the Jacksonville Jaguars as an undrafted free agent in 2020, and was traded to the New York Jets in 2022. In 2020, Robinson broke the National Football League (NFL) record for most scrimmage yards of any undrafted rookie.

== Early life ==
Robinson was born and grew up in Rockford, Illinois. He attended Rockford Lutheran High School, where he played basketball and football. As a senior, he rushed 2,461 yards and 44 touchdowns and was named Class 4A All-State. Robinson set IHSA career records with 9,045 rushing yards and 158 rushing touchdowns.

== College career ==
Robinson started at Illinois State University as a true freshman in 2016 and played in nine games, missing three due to a calf injury. He was largely used in a reserve capacity and finished the season as the Redbirds' third-leading rusher, with 322 yards and two touchdowns on 63 touches.

Robinson became Illinois State’s starting running back as a sophomore in 2017 and quickly emerged as one of the top players in the Missouri Valley Football Conference (MVFC). He rushed for 933 yards and 12 touchdowns, helping lead the Redbirds to an MVFC championship and an appearance in the FCS playoffs. His performance earned him first-team All-MVFC honors.

During his junior season in 2018, Robinson raised his national status. He carried for 1,290 yards and 12 touchdowns, as well as many 100-yard rushing games, establishing his reputation as one of the FCS' most productive backs. Robinson was awarded first-team All-MVFC for the second straight season and earned All-American honors, including first-team honors from Phil Steele and third-team honors from the Associated Press. He was also nominated as a finalist for the Walter Payton Award.

As a senior in 2019, Robinson had one of the best rushing seasons in school history. He led the FCS with 1,899 rushing yards and added 18 touchdowns, earning consensus first-team FCS All-American honors and his third consecutive first-team All-MVFC selection. Robinson concluded his collegiate career with 4,444 rushing yards, the second-most in Illinois State history, and was widely regarded as one of the top FCS running backs heading into the NFL draft.

== Professional career ==
Pre-draft measurables
Height	Weight	Arm length	Hand span	Wingspan	40-yard dash	10-yard split	20-yard split	20-yard shuttle	Three-cone drill	Vertical jump	Broad jump	Bench press
5 ft 9 in (1.75 m)	219 lb (99 kg)	29 5/8 in (0.75 m)	8 3/4 in (0.22 m)	6 ft 0 1/2 in (1.84 m)	4.64 s	1.55 s	2.71 s	4.19 s	7.03 s	40.0 in (1.02 m)	10 ft 5 in (3.18 m)	24 reps
All values from NFL Combine

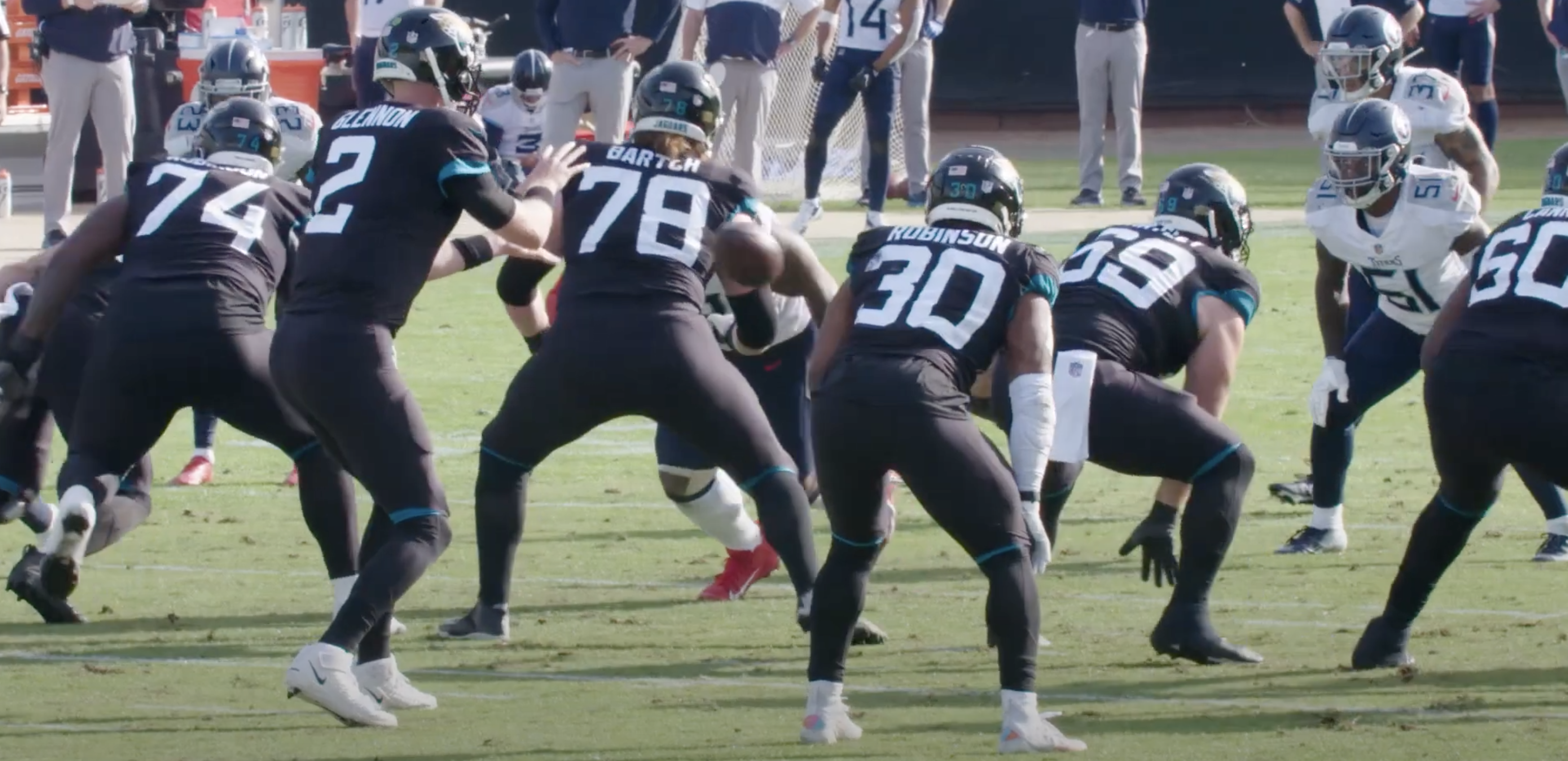
Robinson (#30) playing against the Tennessee Titans in 2020.

=== Jacksonville Jaguars ===
Robinson signed with the Jacksonville Jaguars as an undrafted free agent on April 27, 2020, shortly after the conclusion of the 2020 NFL draft. Robinson made the Jaguars' 53-man regular season roster out of training camp and was announced as the team's starting running back several days later.

Robinson made his NFL debut in Week 1 of the 2020 season against the Indianapolis Colts. He recorded 16 carries for 62 rushing yards and a reception in which he leapt over Colts safety Khari Willis for 28 receiving yards in the 27–20 victory. Robinson became the fourth undrafted rookie running back to start week one since 1970, and set the record for most rushing yards for an undrafted rookie in Week 1. He became the first running back from Illinois State to start a game since Aveion Cason in 2006. A week later, on September 20, 2020, Robinson tallied 120 all-purpose yards and scored his first career touchdown in a 33–30 loss to the Tennessee Titans. In Week 3, against the Miami Dolphins on Thursday Night Football, he had 129 scrimmage yards and two rushing touchdowns in the 31–13 loss. On October 1, 2020, Robinson was named the NFL Offensive Rookie of the Month for his performance in September. In Week 7 against the Los Angeles Chargers, he had 22 carries for 119 rushing yards and one rushing touchdown to go along with four receptions for 18 receiving yards and one receiving touchdown in the 39–29 loss. In Week 10, against the Green Bay Packers, he had 23 carries for 109 rushing yards in the 24–20 loss. In Week 12, against the Cleveland Browns, he had 22 carries for 128 rushing yards and one rushing touchdown to go along with five receptions for 31 receiving yards in the 27–25 loss.

Robinson is the fourth undrafted player in NFL history to rush for 1,000 yards in his rookie season, following Dominic Rhodes, LeGarrette Blount, and Phillip Lindsay. He also finished with the record for most scrimmage yards of any rookie free agent in NFL history. He was named to the PFWA All-Rookie Team. Robinson was ranked 100th on the NFL Top 100 Players of 2021 list.

Against the New York Jets in Week 16 of the 2021 season, Robinson tore his Achilles tendon in the first quarter, ending his season. He finished the season with 767 rushing yards and eight touchdowns through 14 games.

=== New York Jets ===
On October 25, 2022, Robinson was traded to the Jets in exchange for a conditional sixth-round pick following an ACL injury to Breece Hall that cut his 2022 season short. It came as 2021 first-round pick Travis Etienne replaced him as the starter in Jacksonville. Robinson only played in four games the rest of the season for the Jets. On the 2022 season, Robinson had 110 carries for 425 rushing yards and three rushing touchdowns to go along with 11 receptions for 51 receiving yards and two receiving touchdowns.

=== New England Patriots ===
On March 17, 2023, Robinson signed a two-year, $8 million contract with the New England Patriots. He was considered a possible short-yardage replacement for the departing Damien Harris, who had signed with the Buffalo Bills. However, on June 12, Robinson was released by the Patriots.

=== New York Giants ===
On July 21, 2023, Robinson signed with the New York Giants. He was released on August 27, 2023.

=== Green Bay Packers ===
On October 17, 2023, the Green Bay Packers signed Robinson to their practice squad. He was released on November 6. He was signed to the practice squad again on November 20, and signed to the active roster two days later. He was released on November 27. He was re-signed to the practice squad on November 29, 2023. He was released again on December 5, 2023.

=== New Orleans Saints ===
On December 13, 2023, the New Orleans Saints signed Robinson to their practice squad. Following the end of the 2023 regular season, the Saints signed him to a reserve/future contract on January 8, 2024. On August 27, the Saints released Robinson.

=== Louisville Kings ===
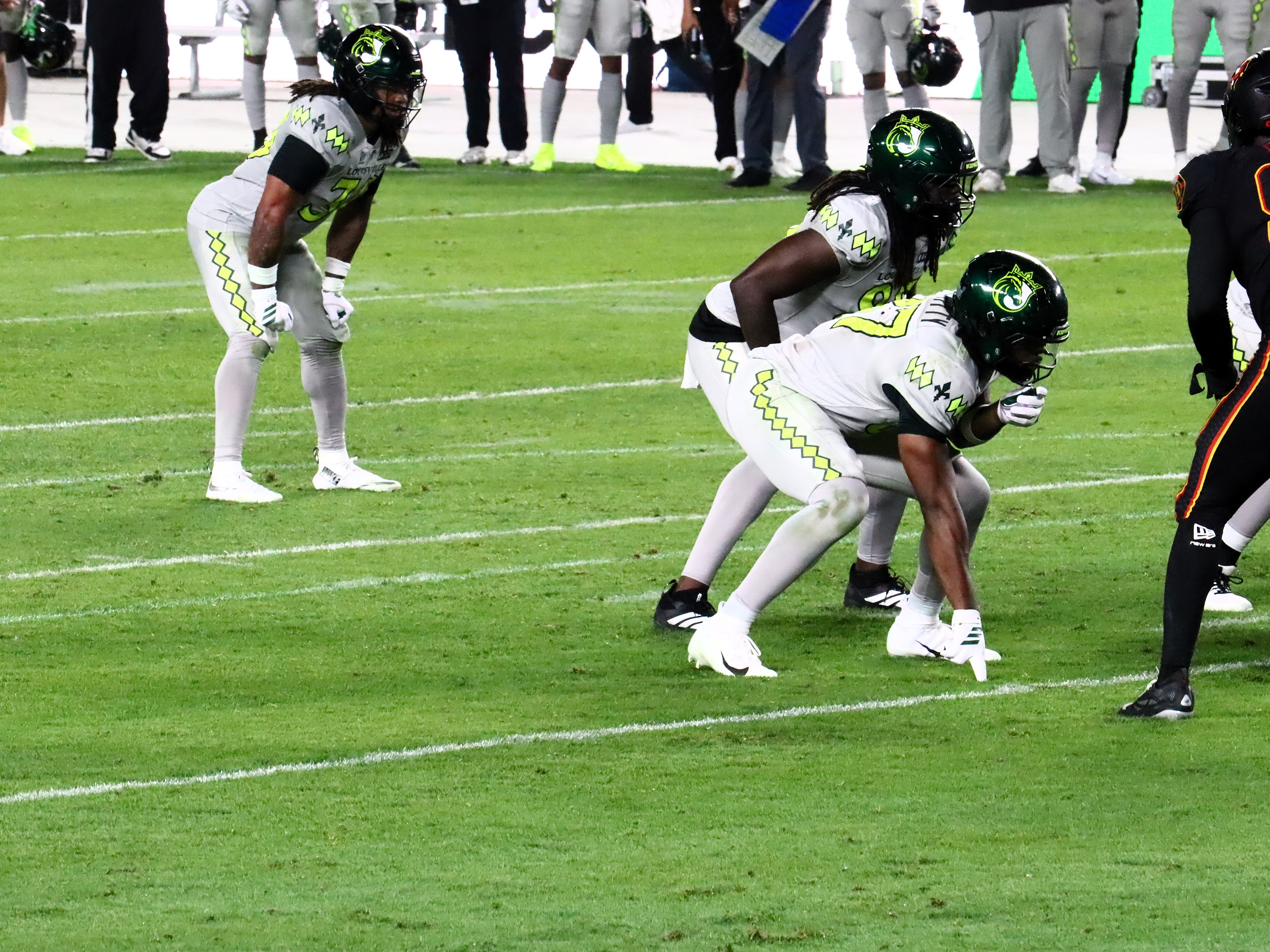
Robinson (backfield, No. 30) with Louisville Kings playing against the Houston Gamblers in 2026.

On March 2, 2026, Robinson signed with the Louisville Kings of the United Football League (UFL). He was released by the Kings on March 19, but was re-signed on April 13. After the Kings started the season 0–3, Robinson made his season debut against the Houston Gamblers in Week 4, serving as a backup to running backs Benny Snell and Ian Wheeler. In Louisville's 24–22 overtime victory, Robinson scored the first rushing touchdown in franchise history. Following the game, Snell was released and Robinson assumed the starting running back role for the remainder of the season. Robinson helped spark a turnaround as Louisville won six of its final seven regular-season games after his return. He finished the regular season with a league-leading 50.0 rushing yards per game, totaling 300 rushing yards and three touchdowns on 82 carries, helping the Kings clinch the No. 3 seed in the UFL playoffs. In the semifinal round against the St. Louis Battlehawks, Robinson recorded a 53-yard touchdown run in Louisville's 29–20 victory. In the 2026 United Bowl, he rushed for 69 yards and a touchdown on 16 carries as the Kings defeated the DC Defenders 27–20 to win the league championship.

== Career statistics ==
=== NFL ===
Year	Team	Games		Rushing					Receiving					Fumbles	
Year	Team	GP	GS	Att	Yds	Avg	Lng	TD	Rec	Yds	Avg	Lng	TD	Fum	Lost
2020	JAX	**14**	**14**	**240**	**1,070**	4.5	47	7	**49**	**344**	7.0	**28**	**3**	3	1
2021	JAX	14	13	164	767	**4.7**	**58**	**8**	31	222	**7.2**	26	0	**4**	**2**
2022	JAX	7	5	81	340	4.2	50T	3	9	46	5.1	10	1	1	0
2022	NYJ	4	0	29	85	2.9	16	0	2	5	2.5	7	1	0	0
2023	GB	1	0	1	2	2.0	2	0	1	−2	−2.0	−2.0	0	0	0
Career		40	32	515	2,264	4.4	58	18	92	615	6.7	28	5	8	3
Source: pro-football-reference.com

=== UFL ===
==== Regular season ====
Legend
	League champion
**Bold**	Career high

Year	Team	Games		Rushing				Receiving			
Year	Team	GP	GS	Att	Yds	Avg	TD	Rec	Yds	Avg	TD
2026	LOU	6	5	82	300	3.7	3	8	68	8.5	0
Career		6	5	82	300	3.7	3	8	68	8.5	0

==== Postseason ====
Year	Team	Games		Rushing				Receiving			
Year	Team	GP	GS	Att	Yds	Avg	TD	Rec	Yds	Avg	TD
2026	LOU	2	2	23	120	5.2	2	0	0	0.0	0
Career		2	2	23	120	5.2	2	0	0	0.0	0

=== College ===
Season	Team	GP	Rushing				Receiving			
Season	Team	GP	Att	Yds	Avg	TD	Rec	Yds	Avg	TD
2016	Illinois State	9	63	322	5.1	2	12	109	9.6	1
2017	Illinois State	11	165	933	5.7	12	9	75	8.3	0
2018	Illinois State	11	205	1,290	6.3	12	21	164	7.8	1
2019	Illinois State	15	364	2,010	5.2	18	16	80	5.0	0
Total		46	797	4,555	5.6	44	58	428	7.4	2
