= Jeremy Chinn =

American football player (born 1998)

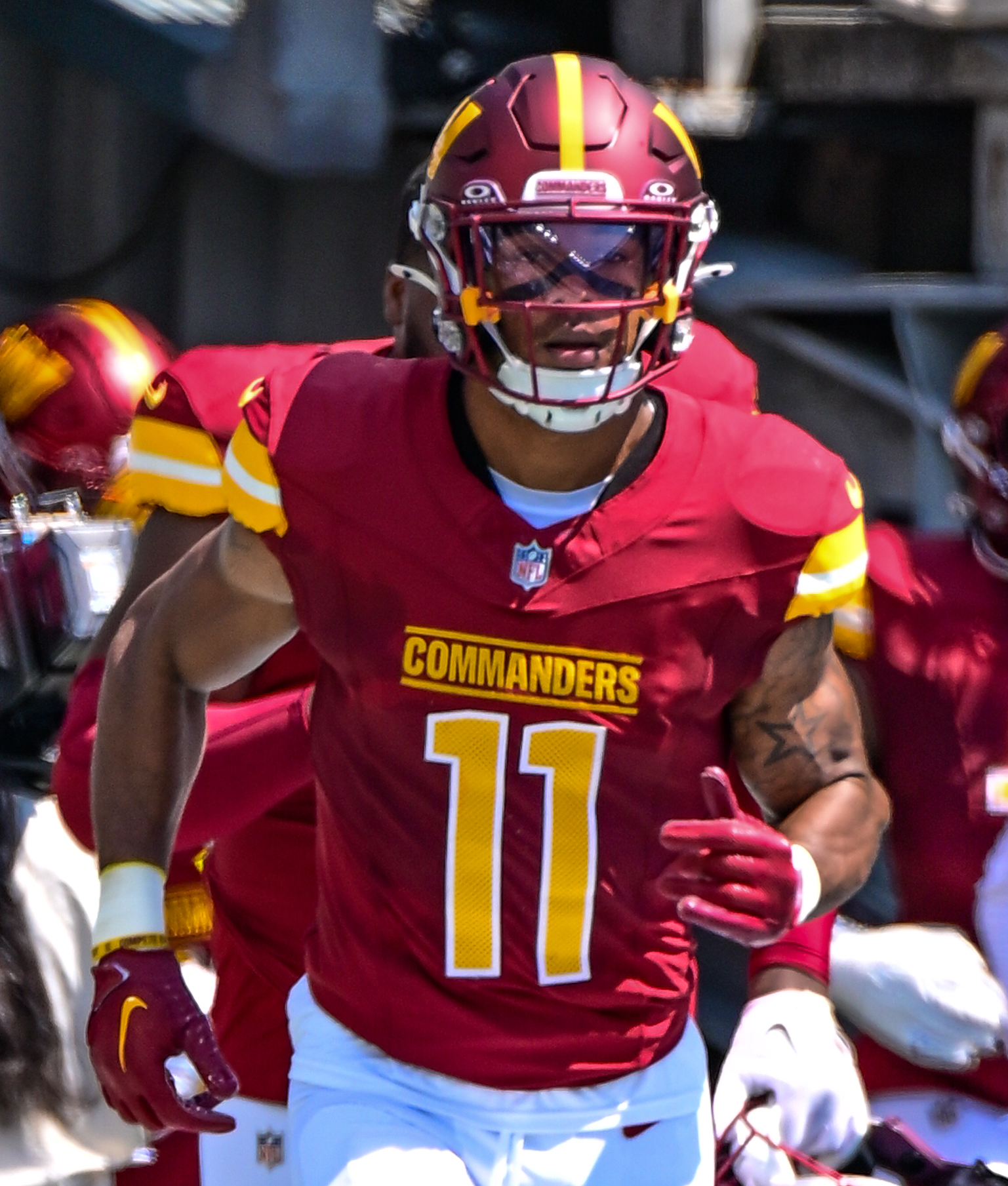
- Chinn with the Washington Commanders in 2024

No. 11 – Las Vegas Raiders
- Position: Safety
- Roster status: Active

Personal information
- Born: February 26, 1998 (age 28); Fishers, Indiana, U.S.
- Listed height: 6 ft 3 in (1.91 m)
- Listed weight: 220 lb (100 kg)

Career information
- High school: Fishers
- College: Southern Illinois (2016–2019)
- NFL draft: 2020: 2nd round, 64th overall pick

Career history
- Carolina Panthers (2020–2023); Washington Commanders (2024); Las Vegas Raiders (2025–present)

Awards and highlights
- PFWA All-Rookie Team (2020)

Career NFL statistics as of Week 8, 2026
- Tackles: 611
- Sacks: 8
- Forced fumbles: 8
- Fumble recoveries: 7
- Pass deflections: 26
- Interceptions: 4
- Touchdowns: 2
- Stats at Pro Football Reference

Jeremy Chinn (born February 26, 1998) is an American professional football safety for the Las Vegas Raiders of the National Football League (NFL). He played college football for the Southern Illinois Salukis and was selected by the Carolina Panthers in the second round of the 2020 NFL draft. Chinn has also played for the Washington Commanders.

== Early life ==
Chinn attended Fishers High School in Fishers, Indiana. He played cornerback and running back for the Tigers football team.

== College career ==
Chinn played at Southern Illinois from 2016 to 2019. He played both safety and cornerback. In 2016, Chinn was named to the Missouri Valley Football Conference (MVFC) All-Newcomer Team, and the Football Championship Subdivision (FCS) Freshman All-American first-team. In 2017, he was named to the All-MVFC second-team. In 2018 and 2019, he was named to the All-MVFC first-team. Chinn was also named a consensus FCS All-American in 2019. During his career, he started 27 of 38 games, recording 243 tackles, 13 interceptions, and one sack.

== Professional career ==
=== Pre-draft ===
On January 25, 2020, Chinn participated in the 2020 Senior Bowl and played under Detroit Lions' head coach Matt Patricia on the North as they defeated the South 34–17. He was able to increase his profile and was overall seen to be impressive, but considered as raw. He attended the NFL Scouting Combine and his 30 on the Wonderlic continued to impress teams, along with his personality. He was a sudden unexpected rising prospect in the 2020 NFL draft and was projected to possibly be a late first-round pick.

External videos
- NFL Combine workout: Jeremy Chinn
- NFL Draft Profile: Jeremy Chinn

NFL analyst Daniel Jeremiah ranked Chinn as the third best safety prospect (48th overall) in the draft. Former NFL executive Gil Brandt had Chinn ranked as the fifth best safety prospect (66th overall). Kevin Hanson of Sports Illustrated had him as the fifth best safety in the draft. Steven Ruiz of USA Today had Chinn as the sixth best safety available in the draft. He was ranked fifth among all safeties (50th overall) by the Draft Network. NFL draft analyst Lance Zierlein projected Chinn to be selected in the second round of the 2020 NFL draft. NFL draft analysts projected him to be a second- or third-round pick at the latest.

"Chinn is a fun player to study. He lined up all over the field in SIU’s scheme. He has an outstanding blend of size, speed and instincts. He is at his best when he’s in the box as a down safety/nickel linebacker. He has tremendous range to make plays sideline to sideline. He can locate and play the ball naturally (see:2019 UMass Minutemen football team the high-point INT vs. UMass). He does have a little tightness when he’s in space, but he recovers quickly. He is a very firm/reliable tackler. Overall, I believe Chinn is ideally suited to play WLB at the next level. He is exactly what teams are looking for in today’s NFL."

— Daniel Jeremiah (NFL Network Lead Analyst)

Pre-draft measurables
Height	Weight	Arm length	Hand span	Wingspan	40-yard dash	10-yard split	20-yard split	Vertical jump	Broad jump	Bench press	Wonderlic
6 ft 3 in (1.91 m)	221 lb (100 kg)	32 1/8 in (0.82 m)	9 5/8 in (0.24 m)	6 ft 5 5/8 in (1.97 m)	4.45 s	1.53 s	2.58 s	41.0 in (1.04 m)	11 ft 6 in (3.51 m)	20 reps	30
All values from NFL Combine

=== Carolina Panthers ===
The Carolina Panthers selected Chinn in the second round (64th overall) of the 2020 NFL draft. The Carolina Panthers orchestrated a trade in order to secure Chinn, agreeing to trade their third- (69th overall) and fifth-round picks (148th overall) in the 2020 NFL Draft to the Seattle Seahawks in exchange for their second-round pick (64th overall) in 2020. Chinn was the fifth safety drafted in 2020 and also became the highest draft pick from Southern Illinois since 1984. He also became the fifth highest pick in the NFL draft hailing from Southern Illinois and the highest drafted safety from his alma mater.

External videos
- Panthers draft Chinn 64th overall

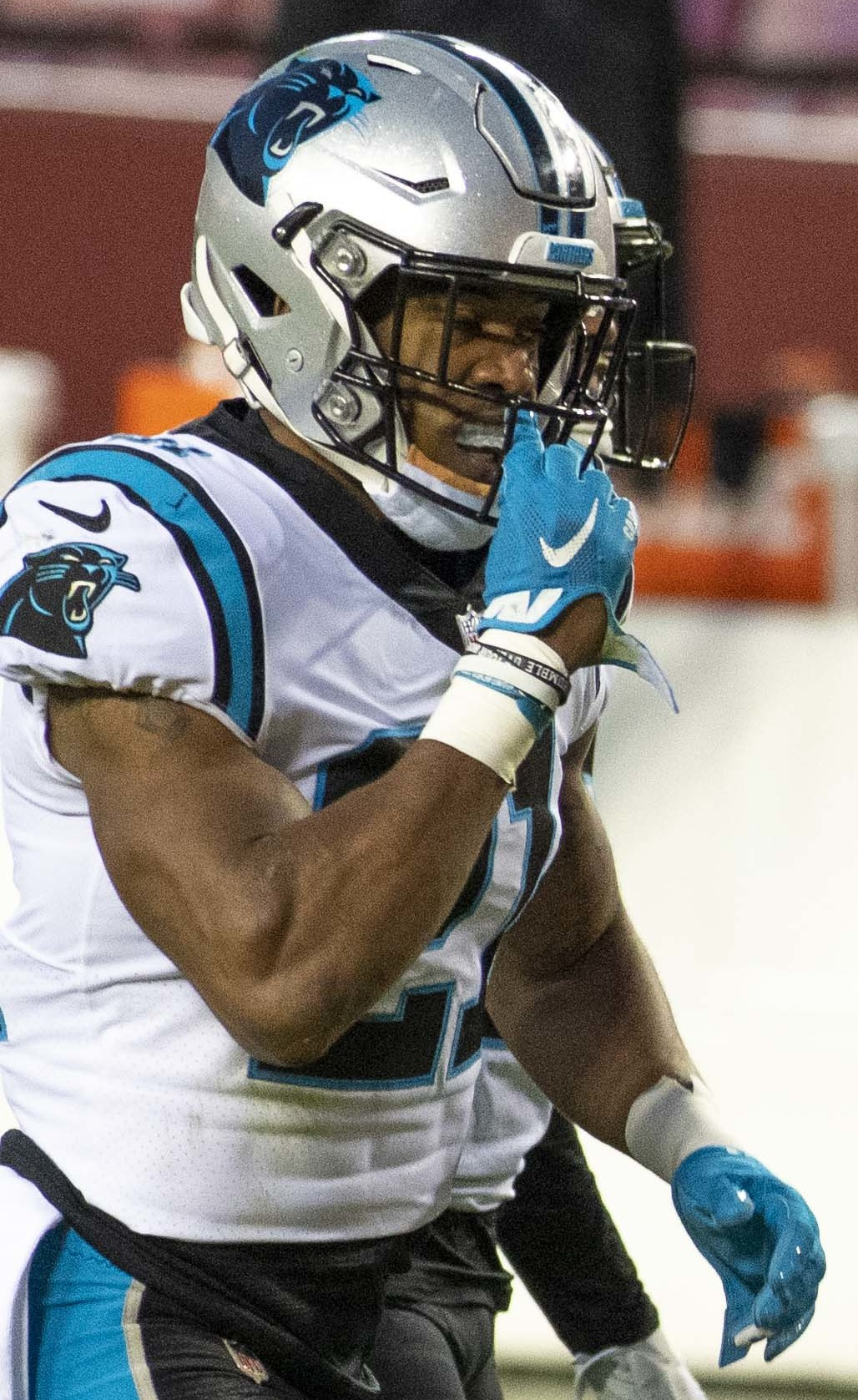
Chinn with the Carolina Panthers in 2020

==== 2020 ====
On June 21, 2020, the Carolina Panthers signed Chinn to a four–year, $5.24 million rookie contract that includes an initial signing bonus of $1.37 million.

Throughout training camp, Chinn competed against Juston Burris and Myles Hartsfield to be the starting strong safety after it was vacant following the departure of Eric Reid. Defensive coordinator Phil Snow had Chinn take reps and learn multiple positions throughout training camp, including as an extra defensive back in nickel and dime packages and at linebacker. Head coach Matt Rhule named Chinn the strong safety to begin 2020, alongside free safety Tre Boston. He was also listed as an option at strongside linebacker alongside Jermaine Carter.

On September 13, 2020, Chinn started in his professional regular season debut and made eight combined tackles (seven solo) in the Panthers' 30–34 home-opening lost to the Las Vegas Raiders. On October 18, 2020, Chinn made five combined tackles (four solo), a season-high two pass deflections, and had his first career interception on a pass attempt by Nick Foles intended for tight end Demetrius Harris during a 23–16 loss to the Chicago Bears. He was named Defensive Rookie of the Month in October after posting 30 tackles, four passes defensed, and an interception. He was inactive for the Panthers' Week 9 loss at the Kansas City Chiefs due to a knee injury. On November 29, 2020, Chinn collected a season-high 13 combined tackles (seven solo) and returned two fumble recoveries for touchdowns in a 28–27 loss at the Minnesota Vikings in Week 12. In the third quarter, defensive end Zach Kerr forced a fumble by Vikings' quarterback Kirk Cousins that Chinn recovered and returned 17–yards for a touchdown. The first play of the Vikings' following series, Chinn and Bravvion Roy forced a fumble by running back Dalvin Cook that was subsequently recovered by Chinn and was returned 28–yards for his second touchdown. Chinn was named the Defensive Rookie of the Month for his performance in November. He was named to the PFWA All-Rookie Team. He finished his rookie season in 2020 with 116 combined tackles (78 solo), five pass deflections, one interception, two forced fumbles, two fumble recoveries, two touchdowns, and a sack in 15 games and 15 starts.

==== 2021 ====
Defensive coordinator Phil Snow named Chinn the starting free safety, alongside Justin Burris to begin 2021. On November 21, 2021, Chinn collected a season-high 13 combined tackles (eight solo) during a 21–29 loss to the Atlanta Falcons. He was inactive for the Panthers' regular season finale at the Tampa Bay Buccaneers after rolling his ankle in practice. He finished with 107 combined tackles (75 solo), five pass deflections, one fumble recovery, one sack, and one interception in 16 games and 16 starts. He earned a career-high overall grade of 71.4 from Pro Football Focus in 2021. He received a coverage grade of 74.3 from PFF.

==== 2022 ====
On September 25, 2022, Chinn had eight combined tackles (six solo), a season-high two pass deflections, and one sack during a 22–14 win against the New Orleans Saints. The following week, Chinn played six snaps before exiting the Panthers' 16–26 loss to the Arizona Cardinals after injuring his hamstring in the first quarter. On October 5, 2022, the Carolina Panthers officially placed Chinn on injured reserve due to his hamstring injury. On October 10, 2022, the Carolina Panthers fired head coach Matt Rhule after starting the season 1–4. Secondary coach Steve Wilkes was named interim head coach for the rest of the 2022 NFL season. On November 19, 2022, Chinn was activated from injured reserve after missing six consecutive games (Weeks 5–10). In Week 15, he racked up a season-high 14 combined tackles (11 solo) and deflected a pass in a 16–24 loss against the Pittsburgh Steelers. He finished the season with 70 combined tackles (51 solo), six pass deflections, and one sack in 11 games and 11 starts. He received an overall grade of 54.9 from Pro Football Focus, which ranked 79th among 89 qualifying safeties.

==== 2023 ====
Chinn entered training camp without a solidified role after Vonn Bell was signed to be the starting strong safety. Ejiro Evero was hired as the defensive coordinator and opted for a base 3-4 defense. Chinn took reps at multiple positions as a linebacker and safety or a fifth or sixth defensive back in nickel and dime packages. Head coach Frank Reich named Vonn Bell and Xavier Woods the starting safeties with Chinn listed on the depth chart as the first team nickelback, but playing as a hybrid safety/linebacker.

On September 10, 2023, Chinn started in the Carolina Panthers' season-opener at nickelback and collected a season-high seven combined tackles (three solo) during a 10–24 loss at the Atlanta Falcons. In Week 4, he racked up a season-high six solo tackles and sacked Kirk Cousins during a 13–21 loss to the Minnesota Vikings. On October 15, 2023, Chinn exited in the first quarter of the Carolina Panthers' 21–42 loss at the Miami Dolphins due to an injury to his quadriceps. On October 24, 2023, the Carolina Panthers placed Chinn on injured reserve after it was discovered he had sustained a significant quad injury, but would not require surgery. He was inactive for the next five games (Weeks 8–12). He was activated on December 2. In his last season with the Panthers he finished with 30 combined tackles (18 solo), one pass deflection, and one sack in only 12 games and eight starts.

=== Washington Commanders ===
==== 2024 ====
On March 12, 2024, the Washington Commanders signed Chinn to a one–year, $4.10 million contract that includes $3.49 million guaranteed and an initial signing bonus of $2.37 million. Chinn stated he also received a higher valued contract offer from the Pittsburgh Steelers, but ultimately chose Washington to play under Dan Quinn and Joe Whitt Jr. He was also reunited with former Panthers' linebacker Frankie Luvu.

He entered training camp as the projected strong safety, replacing Kamren Curl who departed in free agency. Head coach Dan Quinn selected Chinn to open the season as the starting strong safety, alongside free safety Quan Martin.

On November 10, 2024, he tied his season-high of 13 combined tackles (seven solo), made one pass deflection, and intercepted a pass thrown by Russell Wilson intended for George Pickens during a 28–27 loss to the Pittsburgh Steelers. The following week, Chinn recorded a season-high ten solo tackles (13 combined) and had his third consecutive game with 13 tackles as the Commanders were defeated 18–26 in Week 11 at the Philadelphia Eagles. He started in all 17 games in 2024 and had a career-high 117 combined tackles (73 solo), five pass deflections, a career-high two sacks, one interception, two fumble recoveries, and one forced fumble. This marked his first full season playing all 17 games. He received an overall grade of 65.2 from Pro Football Focus.

With 32 seconds remaining in the Divisional round game, Chinn had the game-sealing interception on Detroit Lions quarterback, Jared Goff, that guaranteed the Commanders' 45–31 victory and advanced the team to the NFC Championship Game.

=== Las Vegas Raiders ===
==== 2025 ====
On March 13, 2025, the Las Vegas Raiders signed Chinn on a two-year, $16.25 million contract that includes $12.25 million guaranteed upon signing and an initial signing bonus of $4.00 million. He started all 15 of his appearances for the Raiders, compiling two pass deflections, two forced fumbles, one sack, and 114 combined tackles. On December 24, Chinn was placed on season-ending injured reserve due to a back injury.

==== 2026 ====
Entering the 2026 season, he was the starting strong safety with rookie Dalton Johnson as the backup. In Week 8 against the New York Jets, Chinn recorded a critical toe-tapping interception at the end zone off Geno Smith with 14 seconds left in the fourth quarter. This play helped the Raiders win the game and snapped a four-game losing streak, 38–33.

== NFL career statistics ==
Legend
	Led the league
**Bold**	Career high

=== Regular season ===
Year	Team	Games		Tackles						Interceptions						Fumbles			
Year	Team	GP	GS	Comb	Solo	Ast	Sck	TFL	Sfty	PD	Int	Yds	Avg	Lng	TD	FF	FR	Yds	TD
2020	CAR	15	15	116	67	49	1.0	2	0	5	**1**	0	0.0	0	0	**2**	**2**	**45**	**2**
2021	CAR	16	16	107	**75**	32	1.0	6	0	5	**1**	0	0.0	0	0	1	1	16	0
2022	CAR	11	11	70	51	19	1.0	2	0	**6**	0	0	0.0	0	0	0	0	0	0
2023	CAR	12	8	30	18	12	1.0	2	0	1	0	0	0.0	0	0	0	0	0	0
2024	WAS	**17**	**17**	**117**	73	44	**2.0**	**7**	0	5	**1**	0	0.0	0	0	1	**2**	0	0
2025	LV	15	15	114	63	**51**	1.0	3	0	2	0	0	0.0	0	0	**2**	0	0	0
2026	LV	8	8	56	38	18	1.0	1	0	2	**1**	0	0.0	0	0	**2**	**2**	43	0
Career		94	90	611	386	225	8.0	23	0	26	4	0	0.0	0	0	8	7	104	2

=== Postseason ===
Year	Team	Games		Tackles						Interceptions						Fumbles			
Year	Team	GP	GS	Comb	Solo	Ast	Sck	TFL	Sfty	PD	Int	Yds	Avg	Lng	TD	FF	FR	Yds	TD
2024	WAS	3	3	29	17	12	0.0	0	0	1	1	7	7.0	7	0	0	0	0	0
Career		3	3	29	17	12	0.0	0	0	1	1	7	7.0	7	0	0	0	0	0

== Personal life ==
Chinn's uncle is Pro Football Hall of Fame safety Steve Atwater, who played for the Denver Broncos in the 1990s.
