= Luther Kirk =

American football player (born 1996)

Profile
- Position: Safety

Personal information
- Born: November 7, 1996 (age 29); Garland, Texas, U.S.
- Listed height: 6 ft 2 in (1.88 m)
- Listed weight: 195 lb (88 kg)

Career information
- High school: Garland (TX)
- College: Illinois State
- NFL draft: 2020: undrafted

Career history
- Dallas Cowboys (2020)*; Minnesota Vikings (2020–2021); Atlanta Falcons (2021–2022); Cleveland Browns (2022)*
- * Offseason or practice squad member only

Awards and highlights
- All-MVFC (2018)

Career NFL statistics
- Games played: 1
- Stats at Pro Football Reference

Luther Kirk (born November 7, 1996) is an American football safety. He played college football at Illinois State and was signed by the Dallas Cowboys as an undrafted free agent in 2020.

== Early life ==
Kirk was born on November 7, 1996, in Garland, Texas. He attended Garland High School, and played quarterback and safety for their football team.

As a senior, he completed 87-of-165 passing attempts, throwing for 1,160 yards and 12 touchdowns, while also posting 93 carries for 798 rushing yards and five touchdowns.

== College career ==
Kirk accepted a football scholarship from Illinois State University. As a freshman in 2015, he appeared in 10 games as a backup safety, making a total of 18 tackles and 4 passes defensed.

As a sophomore in 2016, he played in all 12 games, finishing the year with 15 defensive tackles and leading the team with 9 special teams tackles.

Kirk stayed in school, but left the football team in 2017, returning for Spring 2018 workouts. He was named team captain that year, and started all 11 games at the safety position. His five interceptions tied for first in the Missouri Valley Football Conference (MVFC). He also placed second on the team with 61 tackles, and was named first-team all-conference at the end of the year.

As a senior in 2019, he started all 15 games at strong safety, leading the team with 89 tackles, while also making 6 passes defensed, 3 sacks and one forced fumble. He was named an AFCA FCS Coaches' and HERO Sports FCS All-America first-team selection and earned STATS FCS All-America second-team honors.

== Professional career ==
=== Dallas Cowboys ===
Kirk was signed as an undrafted free agent by the Dallas Cowboys after the 2020 NFL draft on April 26. He was waived at the final roster cuts on September 5, but re-signed to the practice squad a day later. He was released from the practice squad on September 15.

=== Minnesota Vikings ===
On September 28, Kirk was signed by the Minnesota Vikings to their practice squad. He was promoted to the active roster prior to their game against the Green Bay Packers, and reverted afterwards. Kirk was waived/injured after the final roster cuts in August 2021.

=== Atlanta Falcons ===
On October 25, 2021, Kirk was signed by the Atlanta Falcons to the practice squad. He was elevated to the active roster for their game against the Buffalo Bills, and made his NFL debut in the 15–29 loss.

On May 16, 2022, Kirk was waived by the Falcons.

=== Cleveland Browns ===
On May 17, 2022, Kirk was claimed off waivers by the Cleveland Browns. He was waived on August 22, 2022.
