= 2019 Montana Grizzlies football team =

American college football season

2019 Montana Grizzlies football

NCAA Division I Quarterfinal, L 10–17 at Weber State
- Conference: Big Sky Conference

Ranking
- STATS: No. 6
- FCS Coaches: No. 6
- Record: 10–4 (6–2 Big Sky)
- Head coach: Bobby Hauck (9th season)
- Offensive coordinator: Timm Rosenbach (3rd season)
- Offensive scheme: Spread
- Defensive coordinator: Kent Baer (2nd season)
- Base defense: 3–3–5
- Home stadium: Washington–Grizzly Stadium

2019 Big Sky Conference football standings
	Conf.			Overall
Team	W		L	W		L
No. 3 Weber State +^	7	–	1	11	–	4
No. 9 Sacramento State +^	7	–	1	9	–	4
No. 4 Montana State ^	6	–	2	11	–	4
No. 6 Montana ^	6	–	2	10	–	4
Eastern Washington	6	–	2	7	–	5
Idaho	3	–	5	5	–	7
Portland State	3	–	5	5	–	7
UC Davis	3	–	5	5	–	7
Northern Arizona	2	–	6	4	–	8
Cal Poly	2	–	6	3	–	8
Idaho State	2	–	6	3	–	9
Southern Utah	2	–	6	3	–	9
Northern Colorado	2	–	6	2	–	10
+ – Conference co-champions; ^ – FCS playoff participant; Although North Dakota was classified as an independent, games against them still counted as Big Sky Conference games.; Rankings from STATS Poll

The 2019 Montana Grizzlies football team represented the University of Montana in the 2019 NCAA Division I FCS football season. The Grizzlies were led by second-year head coach Bobby Hauck, ninth overall as he previously was head coach from 2003–2009, and played their home games on campus at Washington–Grizzly Stadium in Missoula, Montana as a charter member of the Big Sky Conference. They finished the season 10–4, 6–2 in Big Sky play to finish in a three-way tie for third place. They received an at-large bid to the FCS Playoffs where, after a first round bye, they defeated Southeastern Louisiana in the second round before losing to Weber State in the quarterfinals.

== Preseason ==
=== Big Sky preseason poll ===
The Big Sky released their preseason media and coaches' polls on July 15, 2019. The Grizzlies were picked to finish in fifth place by the media, and in fourth place by the coaches.

=== Preseason All–Big Sky team ===
The Grizzlies had three players selected to the preseason all-Big Sky team.

Offense

Samuel Akem – WR

Defense

Dante Olson – ILB

Special teams

Jace Lewis – ST

== Schedule ==
Date	Time	Opponent	Rank	Site	TV	Result	Attendance
August 31	1:00 p.m.	at South Dakota*	No. 25	DakotaDome; Vermillion, SD	KTMF	W 31–17	5,193
September 7	7:00 p.m.	North Alabama*	No. 22	Washington–Grizzly Stadium; Missoula, MT	KTMF	W 61–17	24,033
September 14	8:45 p.m.	at No. 15 (FBS) Oregon*	No. 20	Autzen Stadium; Eugene, OR	P12N	L 3–35	49,098
September 21	1:00 p.m.	Monmouth*	No. 19	Washington–Grizzly Stadium; Missoula, MT	KTMF	W 47–27	23,119
September 28	2:00 p.m.	at No. 4 UC Davis	No. 18	UC Davis Health Stadium; Davis, CA	RTNW	W 45–20	10,011
October 5	1:00 p.m.	Idaho State^{†}	No. 8	Washington–Grizzly Stadium; Missoula, MT	RTNW	W 59–20	25,023
October 19	7:00 p.m.	at No. 15 Sacramento State	No. 5	Hornet Stadium; Sacramento, CA	KTMF	L 22–49	15,140
October 26	12:00 p.m.	Eastern Washington	No. 10	Washington–Grizzly Stadium; Missoula, MT (EWU–UM Governors Cup)	RTNW	W 34–17	24,072
November 2	3:00 p.m.	at Portland State	No. 8	Hillsboro Stadium; Hillsboro, OR	KTMF	W 38–23	6,191
November 9	1:00 p.m.	Idaho	No. 6	Washington–Grizzly Stadium; Missoula, MT (Little Brown Stein)	RTNW	W 42–17	22,333
November 16	1:00 p.m.	No. 3 Weber State	No. 5	Washington–Grizzly Stadium; Missoula, MT	RTNW	W 35–16	22,682
November 23	12:00 p.m.	at No. 8 Montana State	No. 3	Bobcat Stadium; Bozeman, MT (rivalry)	RTNW	L 14–48	19,827
December 7	1:00 p.m.	Southeastern Louisiana*	No. 7	Washington–Grizzly Stadium; Missoula, MT (NCAA Division I Second Round)	ESPN3	W 73–28	16,550
December 13	8:00 p.m.	at No. 4 Weber State*	No. 7	Stewart Stadium; Ogden, UT (NCAA Division I Quarterfinal)	ESPN2	L 10–17	6,422
*Non-conference game; ^{†}Homecoming; Rankings from STATS Poll released prior to the game; All times are in Mountain time

== Game summaries ==
=== At South Dakota ===
	1	2	3	4	Total
No. 25 Grizzlies	0	17	14	0	31
Coyotes	0	10	7	0	17

=== North Alabama ===
	1	2	3	4	Total
Lions	7	10	0	0	17
No. 22 Grizzlies	10	6	24	21	61

=== At Oregon ===
	1	2	3	4	Total
No. 20 Grizzlies	0	0	3	0	3
No. 15 (FBS) Ducks	14	7	7	7	35

=== Monmouth ===
	1	2	3	4	Total
Hawks	0	14	6	7	27
No. 19 Grizzlies	0	21	12	14	47

=== At UC Davis ===
	1	2	3	4	Total
No. 18 Grizzlies	7	10	21	7	45
No. 4 Aggies	0	7	7	6	20

=== Idaho State ===
	1	2	3	4	Total
Bengals	10	7	3	0	20
No. 8 Grizzlies	0	24	14	21	59

=== At Sacramento State ===
	1	2	3	4	Total
No. 5 Grizzlies	7	8	7	0	22
No. 15 Hornets	18	17	14	0	49

=== Eastern Washington ===
	1	2	3	4	Total
Eagles	0	14	3	0	17
No. 10 Grizzlies	3	7	10	14	34

=== At Portland State ===
	1	2	3	4	Total
No. 8 Grizzlies	7	7	14	10	38
Vikings	0	17	6	0	23

=== Idaho ===
	1	2	3	4	Total
Vandals	3	7	0	7	17
No. 6 Grizzlies	0	14	14	14	42

=== Weber State ===
	1	2	3	4	Total
No. 3 Wildcats	3	0	0	13	16
No. 5 Grizzlies	14	7	14	0	35

=== At Montana State ===
	1	2	3	4	Total
No. 3 Grizzlies	0	14	0	0	14
No. 8 Bobcats	17	14	3	14	48

== FCS Playoffs ==
The Grizzlies entered the postseason tournament as the number six seed, with a first-round bye.

=== Southeastern Louisiana–Second Round ===
	1	2	3	4	Total
Lions	7	14	7	0	28
No. 7 Grizzlies	10	28	20	15	73

=== At Weber State–Quarterfinals ===
	1	2	3	4	Total
No. 7 Grizzlies	0	7	0	3	10
No. 4 Wildcats	0	3	7	7	17

== Ranking movements ==
Ranking movements Legend: ██ Increase in ranking ██ Decrease in ranking RV = Received votes т = Tied with team above or below
	Week														
Poll	Pre	1	2	3	4	5	6	7	8	9	10	11	12	13	Final
STATS FCS	25	22	20	19	18	8	8	5	10	8	6	5	3	7	6
Coaches	RV	23	18–T	19	17	9	8	6	11	8	5	4	3	8	6
