= 2019 Cal Poly Mustangs football team =

American college football season

2019 Cal Poly Mustangs football
- Conference: Big Sky Conference
- Record: 3–8 (2–6 Big Sky)
- Head coach: Tim Walsh (11th season)
- Offensive coordinator: Jim Craft (3rd season)
- Offensive scheme: Spread triple-option
- Defensive coordinator: Josh Brown (8th season)
- Base defense: 3–4
- Home stadium: Alex G. Spanos Stadium

2019 Big Sky Conference football standings
	Conf.			Overall
Team	W		L	W		L
No. 3 Weber State +^	7	–	1	11	–	4
No. 9 Sacramento State +^	7	–	1	9	–	4
No. 4 Montana State ^	6	–	2	11	–	4
No. 6 Montana ^	6	–	2	10	–	4
Eastern Washington	6	–	2	7	–	5
Idaho	3	–	5	5	–	7
Portland State	3	–	5	5	–	7
UC Davis	3	–	5	5	–	7
Northern Arizona	2	–	6	4	–	8
Cal Poly	2	–	6	3	–	8
Idaho State	2	–	6	3	–	9
Southern Utah	2	–	6	3	–	9
Northern Colorado	2	–	6	2	–	10
+ – Conference co-champions; ^ – FCS playoff participant; Although North Dakota was classified as an independent, games against them still counted as Big Sky Conference games.; Rankings from STATS Poll

The 2019 Cal Poly Mustangs football team represented California Polytechnic State University, San Luis Obispo as member of the Big Sky Conference during the 2019 NCAA Division I FCS football season. Led by Tim Walsh in his 11th and final season as head coach, Cal Poly compiled an overall record of 3–8 with a mark of 2–6 in conference play, placing in a five-way tie for ninth in the Big Sky. The Mustangs played home games at Mustang Stadium in San Luis Obispo, California.

On November 25, Walsh announced his retirement. He finished his 11-year tenure at Cal Poly with a record of 59–66.

== Schedule ==
Date	Time	Opponent	Site	TV	Result	Attendance	Source
August 31	2:05 p.m.	San Diego*	Alex G. Spanos Stadium; San Luis Obispo, CA	Pluto TV	W 52–34	5,779	
September 7	5:00 p.m.	at No. 7 Weber State*	Stewart Stadium; Ogden, UT	Pluto TV	L 24–41	8,792	
September 14	1:15 p.m.	at Oregon State*	Reser Stadium; Corvallis, OR	P12N	L 7–45	33,585	
September 28	5:05 p.m.	at Southern Utah	Eccles Coliseum; Cedar City, UT	Pluto TV	W 24–21	7,741	
October 5	5:05 p.m.	No. 6 Montana State	Alex G. Spanos Stadium; San Luis Obispo, CA	Pluto TV	L 28–34 ^{OT}	8,236	
October 12	4:05 p.m.	at No. 24 UC Davis	UC Davis Health Stadium; Davis, CA (Battle for the Golden Horseshoe)	Eleven	L 24–48	11,194	
October 19	5:05 p.m.	North Dakota	Alex G. Spanos Stadium; San Luis Obispo, CA	Pluto TV	L 26–30	5,186	
October 26	5:05 p.m.	No. 7 Sacramento State	Alex G. Spanos Stadium; San Luis Obispo, CA	Pluto TV	L 14–38	7,032	
November 2	2:05 p.m.	at Idaho	Kibbie Dome; Moscow, ID	Pluto TV	L 9–21	6,424	
November 16	5:05 p.m.	Eastern Washington^{†}	Alex G. Spanos Stadium; San Luis Obispo, CA	Pluto TV	L 41–42	6,582	
November 23	11:05 a.m.	at Northern Colorado	Nottingham Field; Greeley, CO	Pluto TV	W 28–21	2,854	
*Non-conference game; ^{†}Homecoming; Rankings from STATS Poll released prior to the game; All times are in Pacific time

The game with Weber State, fellow Big Sky Conference member, on September 7 was considered a non-conference game and had no effect on the Big Sky standings.

== Preseason ==
=== Big Sky preseason poll ===
The Big Sky released their preseason media and coaches' polls on July 15, 2019. The Mustangs were picked to finish in ninth place in both polls.

=== Preseason All–Big Sky team ===
The Mustangs did not have any players selected to the preseason all-Big Sky team.

== Game summaries ==
=== San Diego ===
	1	2	3	4	Total
Toreros	14	0	7	13	34
Mustangs	14	24	14	0	52

=== At Weber State ===
	1	2	3	4	Total
Mustangs	3	7	7	7	24
No. 7 Wildcats	3	14	14	10	41

=== At Oregon State ===
	1	2	3	4	Total
Mustangs	7	0	0	0	7
Beavers	21	17	7	0	45

=== At Southern Utah ===
	1	2	3	4	Total
Mustangs	3	14	0	7	24
Thunderbirds	0	7	6	8	21

=== Montana State ===
	1	2	3	4	OT	Total
No. 6 Bobcats	0	14	14	0	6	34
Mustangs	7	0	0	21	0	28

=== At UC Davis ===
	1	2	3	4	Total
Mustangs	0	10	7	7	24
No. 24 Aggies	24	10	0	14	48

=== North Dakota ===
	1	2	3	4	Total
Fighting Hawks	0	7	14	9	30
Mustangs	3	14	6	3	26

=== Sacramento State ===
	1	2	3	4	Total
No. 7 Hornets	0	17	7	14	38
Mustangs	0	0	7	7	14

=== At Idaho ===
	1	2	3	4	Total
Mustangs	3	0	0	6	9
Vandals	0	7	7	7	21

=== Eastern Washington ===
	1	2	3	4	Total
Eagles	14	14	7	7	42
Mustangs	0	14	14	13	41

=== At Northern Colorado ===
	1	2	3	4	Total
Mustangs	0	7	7	14	28
Bears	7	7	7	0	21
