= 2019 Idaho Vandals football team =

American college football season

2019 Idaho Vandals football
- Conference: Big Sky Conference
- Record: 5–7 (3–5 Big Sky)
- Head coach: Paul Petrino (7th season)
- Offensive coordinator: Kris Cinkovich (7th season)
- Offensive scheme: Multiple
- Defensive coordinator: Mike Breske (5th season)
- Base defense: Multiple 3–4
- Home stadium: Kibbie Dome

2019 Big Sky Conference football standings
| | Conf. | | | Overall |
| Team | W | | L | W | | L |
|---|---|---|---|---|---|---|
| No. 3 Weber State +^ | 7 | – | 1 | 11 | – | 4 |
| No. 9 Sacramento State +^ | 7 | – | 1 | 9 | – | 4 |
| No. 4 Montana State ^ | 6 | – | 2 | 11 | – | 4 |
| No. 6 Montana ^ | 6 | – | 2 | 10 | – | 4 |
| Eastern Washington | 6 | – | 2 | 7 | – | 5 |
| Idaho | 3 | – | 5 | 5 | – | 7 |
| Portland State | 3 | – | 5 | 5 | – | 7 |
| UC Davis | 3 | – | 5 | 5 | – | 7 |
| Northern Arizona | 2 | – | 6 | 4 | – | 8 |
| Cal Poly | 2 | – | 6 | 3 | – | 8 |
| Idaho State | 2 | – | 6 | 3 | – | 9 |
| Southern Utah | 2 | – | 6 | 3 | – | 9 |
| Northern Colorado | 2 | – | 6 | 2 | – | 10 |
+ – Conference co-champions; ^ – FCS playoff participant; Although North Dakota was classified as an independent, games against them still counted as Big Sky Conference games.; Rankings from STATS Poll

The 2019 Idaho Vandals football team represented the University of Idaho in the 2019 NCAA Division I FCS football season. The Vandals played their home games on campus at the Kibbie Dome in Moscow, Idaho, and were members of the Big Sky Conference. They were led by seventh-year head coach Paul Petrino. They finished the season 5–7, 3–5 in Big Sky play to finish in a three-way tie for sixth place.

== Preseason ==
=== Big Sky preseason poll ===
The Big Sky released their preseason media and coaches' polls on July 15, 2019. The Vandals were picked to finish in eighth place in both polls.

=== Preseason All–Big Sky team ===
The Vandals had two players selected to the preseason all-Big Sky team.

Offense – Noah Johnson – Guard
Special teams – Cade Coffey – Punter

== Schedule ==
| Date | Time | Opponent | Site | TV | Result | Attendance |
|---|---|---|---|---|---|---|
| August 31 | 12:30 p.m. | at No. 15 (FBS) Penn State* | Beaver Stadium; University Park, PA | BTN | L 7–79 | 104,527 |
| September 7 | 6:00 p.m. | Central Washington* | Kibbie Dome; Moscow, ID | Pluto TV | W 41–31 | 5,905 |
| September 14 | 2:00 p.m. | at Wyoming* | War Memorial Stadium; Laramie, WY | ESPN3 | L 16–21 | 28,814 |
| September 21 | 12:00 p.m. | No. 11 Eastern Washington* | Kibbie Dome; Moscow, ID | RTNW | W 35–27 | 6,567 |
| September 28 | 12:00 p.m. | at Northern Colorado | Nottingham Field; Greeley, CO | Eleven/Pluto TV | L 24–27 | 5,373 |
| October 5 | 2:00 p.m. | No. 4 Weber State | Kibbie Dome; Moscow, ID | Pluto TV/SWX | L 35–41 | 5,947 |
| October 12 | 2:00 p.m. | at Portland State | Hillsboro Stadium; Hillsboro, OR | Pluto TV | L 0–24 | 4,675 |
| October 19 | 2:30 p.m. | Idaho State^{†} | Kibbie Dome; Moscow, ID (rivalry) | RTNW | W 45–21 | 10,361 |
| November 2 | 2:00 p.m. | Cal Poly | Kibbie Dome; Moscow, ID | Pluto TV | W 21–9 | 6,424 |
| November 9 | 12:00 p.m. | at No. 6 Montana | Washington–Grizzly Stadium; Missoula, MT (Little Brown Stein) | RTNW | L 17–42 | 22,233 |
| November 16 | 2:00 p.m. | No. 6 Sacramento State | Kibbie Dome; Moscow, ID | Pluto TV/SWX | L 7–31 | 6,108 |
| November 23 | 1:00 p.m. | at Northern Arizona | Walkup Skydome; Flagstaff, AZ | Pluto TV | W 60–53 ^{OT} | 5,120 |
*Non-conference game; ^{†}Homecoming; Rankings from STATS Poll released prior to the game; All times are in Pacific time

- The Eastern Washington game was designated by the Big Sky as a non-conference game.

== Roster ==
2019 Idaho Vandals football team roster
Players
Coaches
Offense

| Pos. | # | Name | Class |
|---|---|---|---|
| RB | 3 | Marquese Albert | Fr |
| WR | 4 | Michael Noil | Fr |
| QB | 6 | Nikhil Nayar | Fr |
| WR | 7 | Cutrell Haywood | So |
| QB | 8 | Mason Petrino | Sr |
| WR | 11 | DJ Lee | So |
| TE | 12 | Connor Whitney | So |
| WR | 14 | Brandon Luckett | Jr |
| QB | 19 | Colton Richardson | Jr |
| RB | 22 | Aundre Carter | Fr |
| RB | 23 | Khalil Forehand | Fr |
| RB | 24 | Roshaun Johnson | So |
| WR | 26 | Jagger Jacobi | Fr |
| RB | 28 | Dylan Thigpen | Jr |
| FB | 32 | Logan Kendall | So |
| RB | 34 | Jack Bamis | Sr |
| FB | 36 | Drew Rice | Fr |
| WR | 39 | Jed Byers | Fr |
| OL | 43 | Carlos Collado III | So |
| TE | 47 | Luke Hyde | Sr |
| FB | 49 | Luke Johnson | Jr |
| OL | 50 | Noah Gunn | Fr |
| OL | 54 | Logan Floyd | So |
| OL | 61 | Bruce Burns | Jr |
| OL | 63 | Benjamin Hidalgo | So |
| OL | 66 | Conner Vrba | Jr |
| OL | 68 | Seth Carnahan | Fr |
| OL | 70 | Josh Guzik | Fr |
| OL | 71 | Edwin Grande | Sr |
| OL | 72 | Sean Tulette | Sr |
| OL | 73 | Darius Archie | So |
| OL | 74 | Noah Johnson | Sr |
| OL | 75 | Matthew Faupusa | Sr |
| OL | 77 | Brian Robinson | Sr |
| OL | 79 | Dylan Korte | So |
| TE | 80 | Hayden Hatten | Fr |
| WR | 82 | Collin Sather | Fr |
| TE | 86 | Dalton Cash | So |
| WR | 88 | Jeff Cotton | Sr |

Defense

| Pos. | # | Name | Class |
|---|---|---|---|
| LB | 1 | Christian Elliss | Jr |
| LB | 3 | Austin Holt | Jr |
| DB | 5 | Lloyd Hightower | Sr |
| DB | 6 | Wyryor Noil | So |
| LB | 7 | Charles Akanno | Jr |
| LB | 8 | Tre Walker | So |
| LB | 10 | Coleman Johnson | Fr |
| DB | 11 | Vaughn Daggs | Jr |
| LB | 11 | Jalan Jenkins | Jr |
| LB | 12 | Robert Miller | Jr |
| DB | 13 | Jante Boston | Sr |
| DB | 15 | Zach Borisch | Fr |
| DL | 16 | Theo Griffin | Jr |
| DB | 16 | Jaxon Woodward | Fr |
| DB | 19 | Tevin Duke | Jr |
| DB | 21 | Ryan Swanson | So |
| DB | 24 | Satchel Escalante | Jr |
| DB | 24 | D'Andrei Pittman | Fr |
| DB | 25 | Jalen Hoover | Jr |
| DB | 27 | Tyrese Dedman | Jr |
| LB | 28 | Christian Blackburn | So |
| DB | 29 | Sedrick Thomas | Sr |
| LB | 30 | Ross Chadderdon | Fr |
| LB | 31 | Talon Davis | So |
| LB | 35 | Kyle Perry | So |
| DB | 37 | Trae Nichols | Jr |
| LB | 40 | Edward Becker | Fr |
| DL | 41 | Dylan Beeler | Jr |
| LB | 45 | JT Mahon | So |
| LB | 46 | Hogan Hatten | Fr |
| LB | 52 | Talon Haskett | Fr |
| DL | 55 | Rahsaan Crawford | Jr |
| DL | 91 | Eric Hale | Sr |
| DL | 92 | Correy Quinn | Fr |
| DL | 93 | Cameron Townsend | Sr |
| DL | 94 | Nate DeGraw | So |
| DL | 95 | Bradley Noesen | So |
| DL | 97 | Vei Thomasi | Jr |

Special teams

| Pos. | # | Name | Class |
|---|---|---|---|
| K | 15 | Cade Coffey | Jr |
| LS | 42 | Cameron Lang | So |
| K | 48 | Noah Croninger | Sr |

Head coach

- Paul Petrino (7th year)

Coordinators/assistant coaches

- Kris Cinkovich (Assistant head coach / Offensive Coordinator / Offensive line)
- Mike Breske (Defensive Coordinator / Safeties)
- Brian Reader (Recruiting Coordinator / Running Backs)
- Adam Breske (Special Teams Coordinator / Outside Linebackers)
- Luther Elliss (Defensive line)
- Charley Molnar (Quarterbacks)
- Steve Oliver (Tight Ends)
- Vernon Smith (Cornerbacks)
- Tony Spencer (Wide Receivers)

Legend

- (C) Team captain
- (S) Suspended
- (I) Ineligible
- Injured
- Redshirt

Roster
Last update: April 1, 2019

Position key

| Back | B | Center | C | Cornerback | CB | Defensive back | DB |
| Defensive end | DE | Defensive lineman | DL | Defensive tackle | DT | End | E |
| Fullback | FB | Guard | G | Halfback | HB | Kicker | K |
| Kickoff returner | KR | Offensive tackle | OT | Offensive lineman | OL | Linebacker | LB |
| Long snapper | LS | Punter | P | Punt returner | PR | Quarterback | QB |
| Running back | RB | Safety | S | Tight end | TE | Wide receiver | WR |

== Game summaries ==
=== At Penn State ===
| | 1 | 2 | 3 | 4 | Total |
|---|---|---|---|---|---|
| Vandals | 0 | 0 | 0 | 7 | 7 |
| Nittany Lions | 20 | 24 | 14 | 21 | 79 |

=== Central Washington ===
| | 1 | 2 | 3 | 4 | Total |
|---|---|---|---|---|---|
| Wildcats | 0 | 17 | 7 | 7 | 31 |
| Vandals | 3 | 14 | 14 | 10 | 41 |

=== At Wyoming ===
| | 1 | 2 | 3 | 4 | Total |
|---|---|---|---|---|---|
| Vandals | 3 | 7 | 3 | 3 | 16 |
| Cowboys | 0 | 14 | 0 | 7 | 21 |

=== Eastern Washington ===
| | 1 | 2 | 3 | 4 | Total |
|---|---|---|---|---|---|
| No. 11 Eagles | 0 | 0 | 7 | 20 | 27 |
| Vandals | 14 | 14 | 0 | 7 | 35 |

=== At Northern Colorado ===
| | 1 | 2 | 3 | 4 | Total |
|---|---|---|---|---|---|
| Vandals | 3 | 14 | 7 | 0 | 24 |
| Bears | 0 | 7 | 10 | 10 | 27 |

=== Weber State ===
| | 1 | 2 | 3 | 4 | Total |
|---|---|---|---|---|---|
| No. 4 Wildcats | 10 | 10 | 14 | 7 | 41 |
| Vandals | 0 | 14 | 7 | 14 | 35 |

The loss was the 52nd for head coach Paul Petrino at Idaho, the most in Vandal history, passing Skip Stahley, whose record was 22–51–1 (.304) in eight seasons (1954–61).

=== At Portland State ===
| | 1 | 2 | 3 | 4 | Total |
|---|---|---|---|---|---|
| Vandals | 0 | 0 | 0 | 0 | 0 |
| Vikings | 0 | 0 | 10 | 14 | 24 |

Idaho was shut out by a Big Sky opponent for only the second time (1986) in over thirty years of league play.

=== Idaho State ===
| | 1 | 2 | 3 | 4 | Total |
|---|---|---|---|---|---|
| Bengals | 0 | 7 | 14 | 0 | 21 |
| Vandals | 17 | 7 | 21 | 0 | 45 |

=== Cal Poly ===
| | 1 | 2 | 3 | 4 | Total |
|---|---|---|---|---|---|
| Mustangs | 3 | 0 | 0 | 6 | 9 |
| Vandals | 0 | 7 | 7 | 7 | 21 |

=== At Montana ===
| | 1 | 2 | 3 | 4 | Total |
|---|---|---|---|---|---|
| Vandals | 3 | 7 | 0 | 7 | 17 |
| No. 6 Grizzlies | 0 | 14 | 14 | 14 | 42 |

=== Sacramento State ===
| | 1 | 2 | 3 | 4 | Total |
|---|---|---|---|---|---|
| No. 6 Hornets | 7 | 17 | 0 | 7 | 31 |
| Vandals | 0 | 0 | 7 | 0 | 7 |

=== At Northern Arizona ===
| | 1 | 2 | 3 | 4 | OT | Total |
|---|---|---|---|---|---|---|
| Vandals | 10 | 14 | 22 | 7 | 7 | 60 |
| Lumberjacks | 10 | 20 | 6 | 17 | 0 | 53 |

== Ranking movements ==
Ranking movements Legend: — = Not ranked RV = Received votes
| | Week | | | | | | | | | | | | | |
| Poll | Pre | 1 | 2 | 3 | 4 | 5 | 6 | 7 | 8 | 9 | 10 | 11 | 12 | Final |
|---|---|---|---|---|---|---|---|---|---|---|---|---|---|---|
| STATS FCS | — | | | | | | | | | | | | | |
| Coaches | RV | | | | | | | | | | | | | |

== NFL draft ==
No Vandals were selected in the 2020 NFL Draft. Jake Luton of Oregon State, a Vandal quarterback as a redshirt freshman in 2015, was taken by the Jacksonville Jaguars in the sixth round, 189th overall.

- List of Idaho Vandals in the NFL draft
