= 2019 Northern Arizona Lumberjacks football team =

American college football season

2019 Northern Arizona Lumberjacks football
- Conference: Big Sky Conference
- Record: 4–8 (2–6 Big Sky)
- Head coach: Chris Ball (1st season)
- Offensive coordinator: Aaron Pflugrad (2nd season)
- Defensive coordinator: Jerry Partridge (1st season)
- Home stadium: Walkup Skydome

2019 Big Sky Conference football standings
	Conf.			Overall
Team	W		L	W		L
No. 3 Weber State +^	7	–	1	11	–	4
No. 9 Sacramento State +^	7	–	1	9	–	4
No. 4 Montana State ^	6	–	2	11	–	4
No. 6 Montana ^	6	–	2	10	–	4
Eastern Washington	6	–	2	7	–	5
Idaho	3	–	5	5	–	7
Portland State	3	–	5	5	–	7
UC Davis	3	–	5	5	–	7
Northern Arizona	2	–	6	4	–	8
Cal Poly	2	–	6	3	–	8
Idaho State	2	–	6	3	–	9
Southern Utah	2	–	6	3	–	9
Northern Colorado	2	–	6	2	–	10
+ – Conference co-champions; ^ – FCS playoff participant; Although North Dakota was classified as an independent, games against them still counted as Big Sky Conference games.; Rankings from STATS Poll

The 2019 Northern Arizona Lumberjacks football team represented Northern Arizona University in the 2019 NCAA Division I FCS football season. They were led by 1st-year head coach Chris Ball and played their home games at the Walkup Skydome. They were members of the Big Sky Conference. They finished the season 4–8, 2–6 in Big Sky play to finish in a five-way tie for ninth place.

== Preseason ==
=== Big Sky preseason poll ===
The Big Sky released their preseason media and coaches' polls on July 15, 2019. The Lumberjacks were picked to finish in sixth place in both polls.

=== Preseason All–Big Sky team ===
The Lumberjacks had two players selected to the preseason all-Big Sky team.

Defense

Jalen Goss – DT

Khalil Dorsey – CB

== Schedule ==
Date	Time	Opponent	Site	TV	Result	Attendance	Source
August 29	6:00 p.m.	Missouri State*	Walkup Skydome; Flagstaff, AZ	Pluto TV	W 37–23	6,891	
September 7	7:45 p.m.	at Arizona*	Arizona Stadium; Tucson, AZ	P12N	L 41–65	40,741	
September 14	4:00 p.m.	Western New Mexico*	Walkup Skydome; Flagstaff, AZ	Pluto TV	W 55–21	5,823	
September 21	4:30 p.m.	at No. 15 Illinois State*	Hancock Stadium; Normal, IL	ESPN+	L 27–40	9,891	
September 28	12:00 p.m.	at No. 7 Montana State	Bobcat Stadium; Bozeman, MT	Pluto TV	L 31–49	19,257	
October 5	4:00 p.m.	Northern Colorado	Walkup Skydome; Flagstaff, AZ	Pluto TV	W 41–23	10,026	
October 19	1:00 p.m.	at No. 4 Weber State	Stewart Stadium; Ogden, UT	Pluto TV	L 28–51	4,421	
October 26	4:00 p.m.	Portland State^{†}	Walkup Skydome; Flagstaff, AZ	Pluto TV	W 31–29	7,324	
November 2	1:00 p.m.	at Eastern Washington	Roos Field; Cheney, WA	Pluto TV	L 38–66	8,602	
November 9	2:00 p.m.	No. 8 Sacramento State	Walkup Skydome; Flagstaff, AZ	Pluto TV	L 34–38	4,257	
November 16	2:00 p.m.	at Southern Utah	Eccles Coliseum; Cedar City, UT (Grand Canyon Rivalry)	Pluto TV	L 30–31	3,711	
November 23	2:00 p.m.	Idaho	Walkup Skydome; Flagstaff, AZ	Pluto TV	L 53–60 ^{OT}	5,120	
*Non-conference game; ^{†}Homecoming; Rankings from STATS Poll released prior to the game; All times are in Mountain time

== Game summaries ==
=== Missouri State ===
	1	2	3	4	Total
Bears	3	3	10	7	23
Lumberjacks	3	17	14	3	37

=== At Arizona ===
	1	2	3	4	Total
Lumberjacks	7	6	14	14	41
Wildcats	21	28	7	7	63

=== Western New Mexico ===
	1	2	3	4	Total
Mustangs	6	0	15	0	21
Lumberjacks	6	24	7	8	45

=== At Illinois State ===
	1	2	3	4	Total
Lumberjacks	14	7	0	6	27
No. 15 Redbirds	10	13	14	3	40

=== At Montana State ===
	1	2	3	4	Total
Lumberjacks	14	14	3	0	31
No. 7 Bobcats	0	14	7	28	49

=== Northern Colorado ===
	1	2	3	4	Total
Bears	3	10	7	3	23
Lumberjacks	0	10	24	7	41

=== At Weber State ===
	1	2	3	4	Total
Lumberjacks	7	14	0	7	28
No. 4 Wildcats	7	7	16	21	51

=== Portland State ===
	1	2	3	4	Total
Vikings	0	9	11	9	29
Lumberjacks	14	7	7	3	31

=== At Eastern Washington ===
	1	2	3	4	Total
Lumberjacks	14	10	7	7	38
Eagles	17	21	21	7	66

=== Sacramento State ===
	1	2	3	4	Total
No. 8 Hornets	14	3	7	14	38
Lumberjacks	0	17	0	17	34

=== At Southern Utah ===
	1	2	3	4	Total
Lumberjacks	3	17	7	3	30
Thunderbirds	3	14	14	0	31

=== Idaho ===
	1	2	3	4	OT	Total
Vandals	10	14	22	7	7	60
Lumberjacks	10	20	6	17	0	53

== Ranking movements ==
Ranking movements Legend: RV = Received votes
	Week													
Poll	Pre	1	2	3	4	5	6	7	8	9	10	11	12	Final
STATS FCS	RV													
Coaches	RV													
