= 2019 Montana State Bobcats football team =

American college football season

2019 Montana State Bobcats football
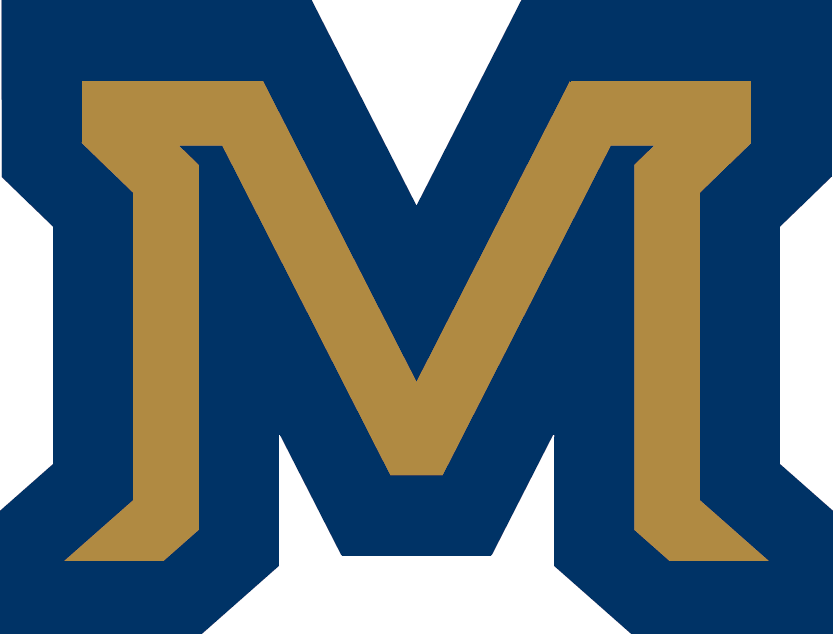

NCAA Division I Semifinal, L 14–42 vs. North Dakota State
- Conference: Big Sky Conference

Ranking
- STATS: No. 4
- FCS Coaches: No. 4
- Record: 11–4 (6–2 Big Sky)
- Head coach: Jeff Choate (4th season)
- Offensive coordinator: Matt Miller (2nd season)
- Offensive scheme: Multiple
- Defensive coordinator: Kane Ioane (1st season)
- Base defense: 4–2–5
- Home stadium: Bobcat Stadium

2019 Big Sky Conference football standings
	Conf.			Overall
Team	W		L	W		L
No. 3 Weber State +^	7	–	1	11	–	4
No. 9 Sacramento State +^	7	–	1	9	–	4
No. 4 Montana State ^	6	–	2	11	–	4
No. 6 Montana ^	6	–	2	10	–	4
Eastern Washington	6	–	2	7	–	5
Idaho	3	–	5	5	–	7
Portland State	3	–	5	5	–	7
UC Davis	3	–	5	5	–	7
Northern Arizona	2	–	6	4	–	8
Cal Poly	2	–	6	3	–	8
Idaho State	2	–	6	3	–	9
Southern Utah	2	–	6	3	–	9
Northern Colorado	2	–	6	2	–	10
+ – Conference co-champions; ^ – FCS playoff participant; Although North Dakota was classified as an independent, games against them still counted as Big Sky Conference games.; Rankings from STATS Poll

The 2019 Montana State Bobcats football team represented Montana State University as a member of the Big Sky Conference during the 2019 NCAA Division I FCS football season. Led by fourth-year head coach Jeff Choate, the Bobcats compiled an overall record of 11–4 with a mark of 6–2 in conference play, placing in a three-way tie for third in the Big Sky. Montana State received an at-large bid to the NCAA Division I Football Championship playoffs, where, after a first round bye, the Bobcats defeated Albany in the second round and Austin Peay in the quarterfinals before losing in the semifinals to the eventual national champion, North Dakota State. The team played home games at Bobcat Stadium in Bozeman, Montana.

== Preseason ==
=== Big Sky preseason poll ===
The Big Sky released their preseason media and coaches' polls on July 15, 2019. The Bobcats were picked to finish in fourth place by the media, and in fifth place by the coaches.

=== Preseason All–Big Sky team ===
The Bobcats had five players selected to the preseason all-Big Sky team.

Offense

Mitch Brott – OL

Troy Andersen – FB

Defense

Bryce Sterk – OLB

Greg Filer – CB

Brayden Konkol – S

== Schedule ==
Date	Time	Opponent	Rank	Site	TV	Result	Attendance
August 31	2:00 p.m.	at Texas Tech*	No. 14	Jones AT&T Stadium; Lubbock, TX	FSN	L 10–45	54,183
September 7	6:00 p.m.	No. 12 Southeast Missouri State*	No. 13	Bobcat Stadium; Bozeman, MT	SWX	W 38–17	19,497
September 14	2:00 p.m.	at Western Illinois*	No. 10	Hanson Field; Macomb, IL	ESPN+	W 23–14	4,728
September 21	1:00 p.m.	Norfolk State*	No. 8	Bobcat Stadium; Bozeman, MT	SWX	W 56–21	17,647
September 28	1:00 p.m.	Northern Arizona	No. 7	Bobcat Stadium; Bozeman, MT	SWX	W 49–31	19,257
October 5	6:05 p.m.	at Cal Poly	No. 6	Alex G. Spanos Stadium; San Luis Obispo, CA	SWX	W 34–28 ^{OT}	8,236
October 12	2:00 p.m.	Sacramento State^{†}	No. 6	Bobcat Stadium; Bozeman, MT	SWX	L 21–34	19,437
October 26	11:00 a.m.	at North Dakota	No. 9	Alerus Center; Grand Forks, ND	SWX/Pluto TV	L 12–16	8,594
November 2	12:00 p.m.	Southern Utah	No. 14	Bobcat Stadium; Bozeman, MT	RTNW	W 42–7	15,617
November 9	12:00 p.m.	at Northern Colorado	No. 12	Nottingham Field; Greeley, CO	SWX	W 45–14	4,442
November 16	5:00 p.m.	at UC Davis	No. 10	UC Davis Health Stadium; Davis, CA	SWX	W 27–17	8,284
November 23	12:00 p.m.	No. 3 Montana	No. 8	Bobcat Stadium; Bozeman, MT (rivalry)	RTNW	W 48–14	19,827
December 7	1:00 p.m.	No. 25 Albany*	No. 5	Bobcat Stadium; Bozeman, MT (NCAA Division I Second Round)	ESPN3	W 47–21	12,947
December 13	6:00 p.m.	No. 18 Austin Peay*	No. 5	Bobcat Stadium; Bozeman, MT (NCAA Division I Quarterfinal)	ESPN3	W 24–10	14,017
December 21	12:00 p.m.	at No. 1 North Dakota State*	No. 5	Fargodome; Fargo, ND (NCAA Division I Semifinal)	ESPN2	L 14–42	18,077
*Non-conference game; ^{†}Homecoming; Rankings from STATS Poll released prior to the game; All times are in Mountain time

== Game summaries ==
=== At Texas Tech ===
	1	2	3	4	Total
No. 14 Bobcats	0	7	0	3	10
Red Raiders	14	14	3	14	45

Statistics	MTST	TTU
First downs	8	35
Total yards	289	691
Rushing yards	127	255
Passing yards	162	436
Turnovers	0	1
Time of possession	29:19	30:41

Team	Category	Player	Statistics
Montana State	Passing	Casey Bauman	7/19, 120 yards, TD
Montana State	Rushing	Isaiah Ifanse	15 rushes, 77 yards
Montana State	Receiving	Coy Steel	3 receptions, 56 yards, TD
Texas Tech	Passing	Alan Bowman	40/53, 436 yards, 2 TD
Texas Tech	Rushing	Armand Shyne	11 rushes, 125 yards, TD
Texas Tech	Receiving	Xavier White	5 receptions, 107 yards, TD

=== Southeast Missouri State ===
	1	2	3	4	Total
No. 12 Redhawks	0	10	0	7	17
No. 13 Bobcats	10	0	28	0	38

Statistics	SEMO	MTST
First downs	12	21
Total yards	245	456
Rushing yards	131	265
Passing yards	114	191
Turnovers	1	1
Time of possession	28:40	31:20

Team	Category	Player	Statistics
Southeast Missouri State	Passing	Daniel Santacaterina	13/28, 114 yards, TD, INT
Southeast Missouri State	Rushing	Geno Hess	13 rushes, 90 yards
Southeast Missouri State	Receiving	Kristian Wilkerson	6 receptions, 77 yards, TD
Montana State	Passing	Casey Bauman	13/25, 136 yards
Montana State	Rushing	Isaiah Ifanse	11 rushes, 114 yards
Montana State	Receiving	Kevin Kassis	6 receptions, 85 yards

=== At Western Illinois ===
	1	2	3	4	Total
No. 10 Bobcats	7	0	10	6	23
Leathernecks	0	7	7	0	14

Statistics	MTST	WIU
First downs	18	15
Total yards	343	337
Rushing yards	194	56
Passing yards	149	281
Turnovers	1	3
Time of possession	29:06	30:54

Team	Category	Player	Statistics
Montana State	Passing	Casey Bauman	16/30, 149 yards
Montana State	Rushing	Logan Jones	21 rushes, 167 yards, 2 TD
Montana State	Receiving	Travis Jonsen	6 receptions, 71 yards
Western Illinois	Passing	Connor Sampson	18/35, 281 yards, TD, INT
Western Illinois	Rushing	Deontez Thompson	14 rushes, 39 yards
Western Illinois	Receiving	Dennis Houston	5 receptions, 141 yards, TD

=== Norfolk State ===
	1	2	3	4	Total
Spartans	7	7	7	0	21
No. 8 Bobcats	14	14	14	14	56

Statistics	NORF	MTST
First downs	15	39
Total yards	351	670
Rushing yards	108	449
Passing yards	243	221
Turnovers	1	0
Time of possession	28:07	31:53

Team	Category	Player	Statistics
Norfolk State	Passing	Juwan Carter	21/32, 243 yards, 2 TD
Norfolk State	Rushing	Kevin Johnson	8 rushes, 112 yards, TD
Norfolk State	Receiving	Dakendall James	5 receptions, 103 yards
Montana State	Passing	Tucker Rovig	21/27, 221 yards, 4 TD
Montana State	Rushing	Lane Sumner	11 rushes, 113 yards, 2 TD
Montana State	Receiving	Coy Steel	5 receptions, 80 yards, 2 TD

=== Northern Arizona ===
	1	2	3	4	Total
Lumberjacks	14	14	3	0	31
No. 7 Bobcats	0	14	7	28	49

=== At Cal Poly ===
	1	2	3	4	OT	Total
No. 6 Bobcats	0	14	14	0	6	34
Mustangs	7	0	0	21	0	28

=== Sacramento State ===
	1	2	3	4	Total
Hornets	7	14	13	0	34
No. 6 Bobcats	7	7	0	7	21

=== At North Dakota ===
	1	2	3	4	Total
No. 9 Bobcats	3	3	0	6	12
Fighting Hawks	7	0	3	6	16

=== Southern Utah ===
	1	2	3	4	Total
Thunderbirds	0	0	0	7	7
No. 14 Bobcats	21	21	0	0	42

=== At Northern Colorado ===
	1	2	3	4	Total
No. 12 Bobcats	7	17	14	7	45
Bears	7	0	0	7	14

=== At UC Davis ===
	1	2	3	4	Total
No. 10 Bobcats	7	7	0	13	27
Aggies	0	10	7	0	17

=== Montana ===
	1	2	3	4	Total
No. 3 Grizzlies	0	14	0	0	14
No. 8 Bobcats	17	14	3	14	48

== FCS Playoffs ==
The Bobcats entered the postseason tournament as the number five seed, with a first-round bye.

=== Albany (Second Round) ===
	1	2	3	4	Total
No. 25 Great Danes	7	0	0	14	21
No. 5 Bobcats	16	10	14	7	47

Statistics	ALB	MTST
First downs	19	28
Total yards	333	483
Rushing yards	60	203
Passing yards	273	280
Turnovers	2	1
Time of possession	26:09	33:51

Team	Category	Player	Statistics
Albany	Passing	Jeff Undercuffler Jr.	18/37, 273 yards, 2 TD, 2 INT
Albany	Rushing	Karl Mofor	12 rushes, 51 yards, TD
Albany	Receiving	Juwan Green	3 receptions, 123 yards, TD
Montana State	Passing	Tucker Rovig	24/30, 279 yards, 3 TD
Montana State	Rushing	Travis Jonsen	8 rushes, 85 yards, TD
Montana State	Receiving	Kevin Kassis	11 receptions, 131 yards, TD

=== Austin Peay (Quarterfinals) ===
	1	2	3	4	Total
No. 18 Governors	0	3	0	7	10
No. 5 Bobcats	10	0	14	0	24

Statistics	APSU	MTST
First downs	10	16
Total yards	197	386
Rushing yards	0	279
Passing yards	197	386
Turnovers	3	1
Time of possession	23:10	36:50

Team	Category	Player	Statistics
Austin Peay	Passing	Javaughn Craig	18/37, 173 yards, TD, 2 INT
Austin Peay	Rushing	Kentel Williams	7 rushes, 9 yards
Austin Peay	Receiving	DeAngelo Wilson	6 receptions, 118 yards, TD
Montana State	Passing	Tucker Rovig	13/20, 114 yards, TD
Montana State	Rushing	Isaiah Ifanse	26 rushes, 196 yards, TD
Montana State	Receiving	Coy Steel	2 receptions, 36 yards

=== At North Dakota State (Semifinals) ===
	1	2	3	4	Total
No. 5 Bobcats	0	7	7	0	14
No. 1 Bison	7	22	7	6	42

Statistics	MTST	NDSU
First downs	13	21
Total yards	298	541
Rushing yards	148	318
Passing yards	150	223
Turnovers	1	1
Time of possession	30:34	29:26

Team	Category	Player	Statistics
Montana State	Passing	Tucker Rovig	13/22, 150 yards, TD, INT
Montana State	Rushing	Isaiah Ifanse	11 rushes, 60 yards
Montana State	Receiving	Kevin Kassis	2 receptions, 45 yards, TD
North Dakota State	Passing	Trey Lance	15/21, 223 yards, 3 TD
North Dakota State	Rushing	Christian Watson	3 rushes, 86 yards, TD
North Dakota State	Receiving	Christian Watson	2 receptions, 88 yards, TD

== Ranking movements ==
Ranking movements Legend: ██ Increase in ranking ██ Decrease in ranking
	Week														
Poll	Pre	1	2	3	4	5	6	7	8	9	10	11	12	13	Final
STATS FCS	14	13	10	8	7	6	6	12	9	14	12	10	8	5	4
Coaches	15	19	15	14	11	7	6	12	9	15	14	10	8	5	4
