= 2019 Portland State Vikings football team =

American college football season

2019 Portland State Vikings football
- Conference: Big Sky Conference
- Record: 5–7 (3–5 Big Sky)
- Head coach: Bruce Barnum (5th season)
- Offensive coordinator: Matt Leunen (2nd season)
- Offensive scheme: Pro spread
- Defensive coordinator: Payam Saadat (2nd season)
- Base defense: 3–3–5
- Home stadium: Hillsboro Stadium

2019 Big Sky Conference football standings
	Conf.			Overall
Team	W		L	W		L
No. 3 Weber State +^	7	–	1	11	–	4
No. 9 Sacramento State +^	7	–	1	9	–	4
No. 4 Montana State ^	6	–	2	11	–	4
No. 6 Montana ^	6	–	2	10	–	4
Eastern Washington	6	–	2	7	–	5
Idaho	3	–	5	5	–	7
Portland State	3	–	5	5	–	7
UC Davis	3	–	5	5	–	7
Northern Arizona	2	–	6	4	–	8
Cal Poly	2	–	6	3	–	8
Idaho State	2	–	6	3	–	9
Southern Utah	2	–	6	3	–	9
Northern Colorado	2	–	6	2	–	10
+ – Conference co-champions; ^ – FCS playoff participant; Although North Dakota was classified as an independent, games against them still counted as Big Sky Conference games.; Rankings from STATS Poll

The 2019 Portland State Vikings football team represented Portland State University during the 2019 NCAA Division I FCS football season. They were led by fifth-year head coach Bruce Barnum and played their home games at Hillsboro Stadium. They were a member of the Big Sky Conference. They finished the season 5–7, 3–5 in Big Sky play to finish in a three-way tie for sixth place.

== Preseason ==
=== Big Sky preseason poll ===
The Big Sky released their preseason media and coaches' polls on July 15, 2019. The Vikings were picked to finish in tenth place in both polls.

=== Preseason All–Big Sky team ===
The Vikings had two players selected to the preseason all-Big Sky team.

Offense

Charlie Taumopeau – TE

Defense

Kenton Bartlett – DT

== Schedule ==
Date	Time	Opponent	Site	TV	Result	Attendance
August 31	1:00 p.m.	at Arkansas*	Donald W. Reynolds Razorback Stadium; Fayetteville, AR	SECN	L 13–20	61,055
September 7	2:05 p.m.	Simon Fraser*	Hillsboro Stadium; Hillsboro, OR	Pluto TV	W 70–7	3,217
September 14	7:15 p.m.	at No. 22 (FBS) Boise State*	Albertsons Stadium; Boise, ID	ESPN2	L 10–45	31,068
September 21	2:05 p.m.	Eastern Oregon*	Hillsboro Stadium; Hillsboro, OR		W 59–9	3,312
September 28	2:05 p.m.	at Idaho State	Holt Arena; Pocatello, ID	Pluto TV	L 24–51	6,398
October 5	2:05 p.m.	Southern Utah	Hillsboro Stadium; Hillsboro, OR	Pluto TV	W 52–31	3,222
October 12	2:05 p.m.	Idaho	Hillsboro Stadium; Hillsboro, OR	Pluto TV	W 24–0	4,675
October 19	12:05 p.m.	at Northern Colorado	Nottingham Field; Greeley, CO	Pluto TV	W 38–30	4,357
October 26	3:00 p.m.	at Northern Arizona	Walkup Skydome; Flagstaff, AZ	Pluto TV	L 29–31	7,234
November 2	2:05 p.m.	No. 8 Montana	Hillsboro Stadium; Hillsboro, OR	Pluto TV	L 23–38	6,191
November 9	2:05 p.m.	UC Davis	Hillsboro Stadium; Hillsboro, OR	Pluto TV	L 28–45	3,378
November 23	1:05 p.m.	at Eastern Washington	Roos Field; Cheney, WA (The Dam Cup)	Pluto TV	L 46–53	8,629
*Non-conference game; Rankings from STATS Poll released prior to the game; All times are in Pacific time

== Game summaries ==
=== At Arkansas ===
	1	2	3	4	Total
Vikings	3	3	0	7	13
Razorbacks	10	0	7	3	20

=== Simon Fraser ===
	1	2	3	4	Total
Clan	7	0	0	0	7
Vikings	7	14	35	14	70

=== At Boise State ===
	1	2	3	4	Total
Vikings	10	0	0	0	10
No. 22 (FBS) Broncos	14	14	10	7	45

=== Eastern Oregon ===
	1	2	3	4	Total
Mountaineers	0	0	6	3	9
Vikings	14	17	21	7	59

=== At Idaho State ===
	1	2	3	4	Total
Vikings	0	10	14	0	24
Bengals	20	21	7	3	51

=== Southern Utah ===
	1	2	3	4	Total
Thunderbirds	0	10	7	14	31
Vikings	10	28	7	7	52

=== Idaho ===
	1	2	3	4	Total
Vandals	0	0	0	0	0
Vikings	0	0	10	14	24

=== At Northern Colorado ===
	1	2	3	4	Total
Vikings	10	14	7	7	38
Bears	0	14	10	6	30

=== At Northern Arizona ===
	1	2	3	4	Total
Vikings	0	9	11	9	29
Lumberjacks	14	7	7	3	31

=== Montana ===
	1	2	3	4	Total
No. 8 Grizzlies	7	7	14	10	38
Vikings	0	17	6	0	23

=== UC Davis ===
	1	2	3	4	Total
Aggies	7	10	7	21	45
Vikings	0	14	7	7	28

=== At Eastern Washington–The Dam Cup ===
	1	2	3	4	Total
Vikings	7	10	8	21	46
Eagles	17	13	15	8	53
