= 2019 Sacramento State Hornets football team =

American college football season

2019 Sacramento State Hornets football

Big Sky co-champion

NCAA Division I Second Round, L 28–42 vs. Austin Peay
- Conference: Big Sky Conference

Ranking
- STATS: No. 9
- FCS Coaches: No. 9
- Record: 9–4 (7–1 Big Sky)
- Head coach: Troy Taylor (1st season)
- Offensive coordinator: Kris Richardson (1st season)
- Offensive scheme: West Coast
- Defensive coordinator: Andy Thompson (1st season)
- Base defense: 4–2–5
- Home stadium: Hornet Stadium

2019 Big Sky Conference football standings
	Conf.			Overall
Team	W		L	W		L
No. 3 Weber State +^	7	–	1	11	–	4
No. 9 Sacramento State +^	7	–	1	9	–	4
No. 4 Montana State ^	6	–	2	11	–	4
No. 6 Montana ^	6	–	2	10	–	4
Eastern Washington	6	–	2	7	–	5
Idaho	3	–	5	5	–	7
Portland State	3	–	5	5	–	7
UC Davis	3	–	5	5	–	7
Northern Arizona	2	–	6	4	–	8
Cal Poly	2	–	6	3	–	8
Idaho State	2	–	6	3	–	9
Southern Utah	2	–	6	3	–	9
Northern Colorado	2	–	6	2	–	10
+ – Conference co-champions; ^ – FCS playoff participant; Although North Dakota was classified as an independent, games against them still counted as Big Sky Conference games.; Rankings from STATS Poll

The 2019 Sacramento State Hornets football team represented California State University, Sacramento as a member of the Big Sky Conference during the 2019 NCAA Division I FCS football season. Led by first-year head coach Troy Taylor, the Hornets compiled an overall record of 9–4 with a mark of 7–1 in conference play, sharing the Big Sky title with Weber State. Sacramento State received an at-large bid to the NCAA Division I Football Championship playoffs where, after a first-round bye, they lost to Austin Peay in the second round. The Hornets played home games at Hornet Stadium in Sacramento, California.

== Preseason ==
=== Big Sky preseason poll ===
The Big Sky released their preseason media and coaches' polls on July 15, 2019. The Hornets were picked to finish in twelfth place by the media and in eleventh by the coaches.

=== Preseason All–Big Sky team ===
The Hornets had one player selected to the preseason all-Big Sky team.

Offense

Elijah Dotson – RB

== Schedule ==
Date	Time	Opponent	Rank	Site	TV	Result	Attendance
August 31	6:00 p.m.	Southern Oregon*		Hornet Stadium; Sacramento, CA	Pluto TV	W 77–19	8,843
September 6	7:00 p.m.	at Arizona State*		Sun Devil Stadium; Tempe, AZ	P12N	L 7–19	42,286
September 14	6:00 p.m.	Northern Colorado*		Hornet Stadium; Sacramento, CA	CW 31	W 50–0	6,753
September 21	7:00 p.m.	at Fresno State*		Bulldog Stadium; Fresno, CA	Stadium Facebook	L 20–34	31,034
October 5	6:00 p.m.	No. 22 Eastern Washington		Hornet Stadium; Sacramento, CA	CW 31/Eleven	W 48–27	9,640
October 12	1:00 p.m.	at No. 6 Montana State		Bobcat Stadium; Bozeman, MT	Pluto TV	W 34–21	19,437
October 19	6:00 p.m.	No. 5 Montana^{†}	No. 15	Hornet Stadium; Sacramento, CA	CW 31	W 49–22	15,140
October 26	5:05 p.m.	at Cal Poly	No. 7	Alex G. Spanos Stadium; San Luis Obispo, CA	Pluto TV	W 38–14	7,032
November 2	6:00 p.m.	No. 3 Weber State	No. 6	Hornet Stadium; Sacramento, CA	CW 31	L 17–36	11,253
November 9	1:00 p.m.	at Northern Arizona	No. 8	Walkup Skydome; Flagstaff, AZ	Pluto TV	W 38–34	4,257
November 16	2:00 p.m.	at Idaho	No. 6	Kibbie Dome; Moscow, ID	Pluto TV	W 31–7	6,108
November 23	2:00 p.m.	UC Davis	No. 4	Hornet Stadium; Sacramento, CA (Causeway Classic)	CW 31	W 27–17	19,882
December 7	5:00 p.m.	No. 18 Austin Peay*	No. 3	Hornet Stadium; Sacramento, CA (NCAA Division I Second Round)	ESPN3	L 28–42	5,140
*Non-conference game; ^{†}Homecoming; Rankings from STATS Poll released prior to the game; All times are in Pacific time

Despite Northern Colorado also being a member of the Big Sky Conference, the September 14 game against Sacramento State was considered a non-conference game.

== Game summaries ==
=== Southern Oregon ===
	1	2	3	4	Total
Raiders	10	3	6	0	19
Hornets	21	28	14	14	77

=== At Arizona State ===
	1	2	3	4	Total
Hornets	0	0	0	7	7
Sun Devils	0	3	6	10	19

=== Northern Colorado ===
	1	2	3	4	Total
Bears	0	0	0	0	0
Hornets	7	15	21	7	50

=== At Fresno State ===
	1	2	3	4	Total
Hornets	6	6	0	8	20
Bulldogs	7	7	0	20	34

=== Eastern Washington ===
	1	2	3	4	Total
No. 22 Eagles	7	7	6	7	27
Hornets	21	6	7	14	48

=== At Montana State ===
	1	2	3	4	Total
Hornets	7	14	13	0	34
No. 6 Bobcats	7	7	0	7	21

=== Montana ===
	1	2	3	4	Total
No. 5 Grizzlies	7	8	7	0	22
No. 15 Hornets	18	17	14	0	49

=== At Cal Poly ===
	1	2	3	4	Total
No. 7 Hornets	0	17	7	14	38
Mustangs	0	0	7	7	14

=== Weber State ===
	1	2	3	4	Total
No. 3 Wildcats	9	14	6	7	36
No. 6 Hornets	3	7	0	7	17

=== At Northern Arizona ===
	1	2	3	4	Total
No. 8 Hornets	14	3	7	14	38
Lumberjacks	0	17	0	17	34

=== At Idaho ===
	1	2	3	4	Total
No. 6 Hornets	7	17	0	7	31
Vandals	0	0	7	0	7

=== UC Davis ===
	1	2	3	4	Total
Aggies	7	10	0	0	17
No. 4 Hornets	3	7	3	14	27

== FCS Playoffs ==
The Hornets entered the postseason tournament as the number four seed, with a first-round bye.

=== Austin Peay–Second Round ===
	1	2	3	4	Total
No. 18 Governors	21	0	14	7	42
No. 3 Hornets	0	0	14	14	28

== Ranking movements ==
Ranking movements Legend: ██ Increase in ranking ██ Decrease in ranking — = Not ranked RV = Received votes
	Week														
Poll	Pre	1	2	3	4	5	6	7	8	9	10	11	12	13	Final
STATS FCS	—	RV	RV	RV	RV	RV	RV	15	7	6	8	6	4	3	9
Coaches	—	—	RV	RV	RV	RV	RV	17	8	6	8	6	4	3	9
