= 2019 Weber State Wildcats football team =

American college football season

2019 Weber State Wildcats football

Big Sky co-champion

FCS Playoffs Semifinals, L 14–30 vs. James Madison
- Conference: Big Sky Conference

Ranking
- STATS: No. 3
- FCS Coaches: No. 3
- Record: 11–4 (7–1 Big Sky)
- Head coach: Jay Hill (6th season)
- Offensive coordinator: Dave Schramm (2nd season)
- Home stadium: Stewart Stadium

2019 Big Sky Conference football standings
| | Conf. | | | Overall |
| Team | W | | L | W | | L |
|---|---|---|---|---|---|---|
| No. 3 Weber State +^ | 7 | – | 1 | 11 | – | 4 |
| No. 9 Sacramento State +^ | 7 | – | 1 | 9 | – | 4 |
| No. 4 Montana State ^ | 6 | – | 2 | 11 | – | 4 |
| No. 6 Montana ^ | 6 | – | 2 | 10 | – | 4 |
| Eastern Washington | 6 | – | 2 | 7 | – | 5 |
| Idaho | 3 | – | 5 | 5 | – | 7 |
| Portland State | 3 | – | 5 | 5 | – | 7 |
| UC Davis | 3 | – | 5 | 5 | – | 7 |
| Northern Arizona | 2 | – | 6 | 4 | – | 8 |
| Cal Poly | 2 | – | 6 | 3 | – | 8 |
| Idaho State | 2 | – | 6 | 3 | – | 9 |
| Southern Utah | 2 | – | 6 | 3 | – | 9 |
| Northern Colorado | 2 | – | 6 | 2 | – | 10 |
+ – Conference co-champions; ^ – FCS playoff participant; Although North Dakota was classified as an independent, games against them still counted as Big Sky Conference games.; Rankings from STATS Poll

The 2019 Weber State Wildcats football team represented Weber State University in the 2019 NCAA Division I FCS football season. The Wildcats were led by fifth-year head coach Jay Hill and played their games at Stewart Stadium as members of the Big Sky Conference. They finished the season 11–4, 7–1 in Big Sky play to finish in a two-way tie for the Big Sky championship with Sacramento State. They received the Big Sky's automatic bid to the FCS Playoffs where, after a first round bye, they defeated Kennesaw State in the second round and Montana in the quarterfinals before losing to James Madison in the semifinals.

== Preseason ==
=== Big Sky preseason poll ===
The Big Sky released their preseason media and coaches' polls on July 15, 2019. The Wildcats were picked to finish in third place in both polls.

=== Preseason All–Big Sky team ===
The Wildcats had seven players selected to the preseason all-Big Sky team, the most of any team in the conference.

Offense

Ty Whitworth – OG

Josh Davis – RB

Defense

Adam Rodriguez – DE

Jonah Williams – DE

Auston Tesch – OLB

Special teams

Trey Tuttle – K

Rashid Shaheed – RS

== Schedule ==
| Date | Time | Opponent | Rank | Site | TV | Result | Attendance | Source |
|---|---|---|---|---|---|---|---|---|
| August 31 | 7:00 p.m. | at San Diego State* | No. 8 | SDCCU Stadium; San Diego, CA | Stadium on Facebook | L 0–6 | 40,222 | |
| September 7 | 6:00 p.m. | Cal Poly* | No. 7 | Stewart Stadium; Ogden, UT | KJZZ/Pluto TV | W 41–24 | 8,792 | |
| September 14 | 5:00 p.m. | at Nevada* | No. 6 | Mackay Stadium; Reno, NV | ESPN3 | L 13–19 | 14,174 | |
| September 28 | 6:00 p.m. | No. 9 Northern Iowa* | No. 5 | Stewart Stadium; Ogden, UT | KJZZ/Pluto TV | W 29–17 | 6,582 | |
| October 5 | 3:00 p.m. | at Idaho | No. 4 | Kibbie Dome; Moscow, ID | Pluto TV | W 41–35 | 5,947 | |
| October 12 | 6:00 p.m. | Southern Utah^{†} | No. 4 | Stewart Stadium; Ogden, UT | KJZZ/Pluto TV | W 29–14 | 10,622 | |
| October 19 | 2:00 p.m. | Northern Arizona | No. 4 | Stewart Stadium; Ogden, UT | Pluto TV | W 51–28 | 4,421 | |
| October 26 | 5:00 p.m. | at No. 22 UC Davis | No. 4 | UC Davis Health Stadium; Davis, CA | Pluto TV | W 36–20 | 8,105 | |
| November 2 | 7:00 p.m. | at No. 6 Sacramento State | No. 3 | Hornet Stadium; Sacramento, CA | Pluto TV | W 36–17 | 11,253 | |
| November 9 | 2:00 p.m. | No. 22 North Dakota | No. 3 | Stewart Stadium; Ogden, UT | Pluto TV | W 30–27 | 9,622 | |
| November 16 | 1:00 p.m. | at No. 5 Montana | No. 3 | Washington–Grizzly Stadium; Missoula, MT | ROOT | L 16–35 | 22,682 | |
| November 23 | 2:00 p.m. | Idaho State | No. 6 | Stewart Stadium; Ogden, UT | Pluto TV | W 38–10 | 7,623 | |
| December 7 | 1:00 p.m. | Kennesaw State* | No. 4 | Stewart Stadium; Ogden, UT (FCS Playoffs Second Round) | ESPN3 | W 26–20 | 5,422 | |
| December 13 | 8:00 p.m. | No. 7 Montana* | No. 4 | Stewart Stadium; Ogden, UT (FCS Playoffs Quarterfinals) | ESPN2 | W 17–10 | 6,422 | |
| December 21 | 4:30 p.m. | at No. 2 James Madison* | No. 4 | Bridgeforth Stadium; Harrisonburg, VA (FCS Playoffs Semifinals) | ESPNU | L 14–30 | 10,487 | |
*Non-conference game; ^{†}Homecoming; Rankings from STATS Poll released prior to the game; All times are in Mountain time

The game against Cal Poly on September 7 was designated as a non-conference game, with no effect on the Big Sky standings.

== Game summaries ==
=== At San Diego State ===
| | 1 | 2 | 3 | 4 | Total |
|---|---|---|---|---|---|
| No. 8 Wildcats | 0 | 0 | 0 | 0 | 0 |
| Aztecs | 0 | 3 | 0 | 3 | 6 |

=== Cal Poly ===
| | 1 | 2 | 3 | 4 | Total |
|---|---|---|---|---|---|
| Mustangs | 3 | 7 | 7 | 7 | 24 |
| No. 7 Wildcats | 3 | 14 | 14 | 10 | 41 |

=== At Nevada ===
| | 1 | 2 | 3 | 4 | Total |
|---|---|---|---|---|---|
| No. 6 Wildcats | 0 | 10 | 3 | 0 | 13 |
| Wolf Pack | 3 | 6 | 7 | 3 | 19 |

=== Northern Iowa ===
| | 1 | 2 | 3 | 4 | Total |
|---|---|---|---|---|---|
| No. 9 Panthers | 3 | 7 | 0 | 7 | 17 |
| No. 5 Wildcats | 20 | 7 | 2 | 0 | 29 |

=== At Idaho ===
| | 1 | 2 | 3 | 4 | Total |
|---|---|---|---|---|---|
| No. 4 Wildcats | 10 | 10 | 14 | 7 | 41 |
| Vandals | 0 | 14 | 7 | 14 | 35 |

=== Southern Utah ===
| | 1 | 2 | 3 | 4 | Total |
|---|---|---|---|---|---|
| Thunderbirds | 0 | 7 | 0 | 7 | 14 |
| No. 4 Wildcats | 0 | 7 | 7 | 15 | 29 |

=== Northern Arizona ===
| | 1 | 2 | 3 | 4 | Total |
|---|---|---|---|---|---|
| Lumberjacks | 7 | 14 | 0 | 7 | 28 |
| No. 4 Wildcats | 7 | 7 | 16 | 21 | 51 |

=== At UC Davis ===
| | 1 | 2 | 3 | 4 | Total |
|---|---|---|---|---|---|
| No. 4 Wildcats | 7 | 9 | 10 | 10 | 36 |
| No. 22 Aggies | 7 | 0 | 7 | 6 | 20 |

=== At Sacramento State ===
| | 1 | 2 | 3 | 4 | Total |
|---|---|---|---|---|---|
| No. 3 Wildcats | 9 | 14 | 6 | 7 | 36 |
| No. 6 Hornets | 3 | 7 | 0 | 7 | 17 |

=== North Dakota ===
| | 1 | 2 | 3 | 4 | Total |
|---|---|---|---|---|---|
| No. 22 Fighting Hawks | 7 | 10 | 7 | 3 | 27 |
| No. 3 Wildcats | 14 | 6 | 0 | 10 | 30 |

=== At Montana ===
| | 1 | 2 | 3 | 4 | Total |
|---|---|---|---|---|---|
| No. 3 Wildcats | 3 | 0 | 0 | 13 | 16 |
| No. 5 Grizzlies | 14 | 7 | 14 | 0 | 35 |

=== Idaho State ===
| | 1 | 2 | 3 | 4 | Total |
|---|---|---|---|---|---|
| Bengals | 0 | 0 | 3 | 7 | 10 |
| No. 6 Wildcats | 7 | 24 | 7 | 0 | 38 |

== FCS Playoffs ==
The Wildcats entered the postseason tournament as the number three seed, with a first-round bye.

=== Kennesaw State–Second Round ===
| | 1 | 2 | 3 | 4 | Total |
|---|---|---|---|---|---|
| No. 15 Owls | 3 | 14 | 0 | 3 | 20 |
| No. 4 Wildcats | 3 | 9 | 14 | 0 | 26 |

=== Montana–Quarterfinals ===
| | 1 | 2 | 3 | 4 | Total |
|---|---|---|---|---|---|
| No. 7 Grizzlies | 0 | 7 | 0 | 3 | 10 |
| No. 4 Wildcats | 0 | 3 | 7 | 7 | 17 |

=== At James Madison–Semifinals ===
| | 1 | 2 | 3 | 4 | Total |
|---|---|---|---|---|---|
| No. 4 Wildcats | 0 | 7 | 0 | 7 | 14 |
| No. 2 Dukes | 10 | 14 | 3 | 3 | 30 |

== Ranking movements ==
Ranking movements Legend: ██ Increase in ranking ██ Decrease in ranking
| | Week | | | | | | | | | | | | | | |
| Poll | Pre | 1 | 2 | 3 | 4 | 5 | 6 | 7 | 8 | 9 | 10 | 11 | 12 | 13 | Final |
|---|---|---|---|---|---|---|---|---|---|---|---|---|---|---|---|
| STATS FCS | 8 | 7 | 6 | 6 | 5 | 4 | 4 | 4 | 4 | 3 | 3 | 3 | 6 | 4 | 3 |
| Coaches | 9 | 8 | 6 | 7 | 6 | 5 | 5 | 5 | 5 | 3 | 3 | 3 | 7 | 4 | 3 |
