= 2019 Northern Colorado Bears football team =

American college football season

2019 Northern Colorado Bears football
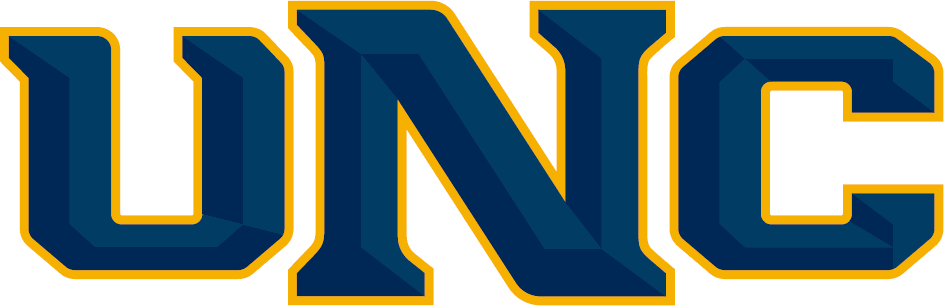
- Conference: Big Sky Conference
- Record: 2–10 (2–6 Big Sky)
- Head coach: Earnest Collins Jr. (9th season)
- Offensive coordinator: Nick Fulton (1st season)
- Offensive scheme: Spread
- Defensive coordinator: Marty English (2nd season)
- Base defense: 4–3
- Home stadium: Nottingham Field

2019 Big Sky Conference football standings
	Conf.			Overall
Team	W		L	W		L
No. 3 Weber State +^	7	–	1	11	–	4
No. 9 Sacramento State +^	7	–	1	9	–	4
No. 4 Montana State ^	6	–	2	11	–	4
No. 6 Montana ^	6	–	2	10	–	4
Eastern Washington	6	–	2	7	–	5
Idaho	3	–	5	5	–	7
Portland State	3	–	5	5	–	7
UC Davis	3	–	5	5	–	7
Northern Arizona	2	–	6	4	–	8
Cal Poly	2	–	6	3	–	8
Idaho State	2	–	6	3	–	9
Southern Utah	2	–	6	3	–	9
Northern Colorado	2	–	6	2	–	10
+ – Conference co-champions; ^ – FCS playoff participant; Although North Dakota was classified as an independent, games against them still counted as Big Sky Conference games.; Rankings from STATS Poll

The 2019 Northern Colorado Bears football team represented the University of Northern Colorado in the 2019 NCAA Division I FCS football season. They were led by ninth-year head coach Earnest Collins Jr. and played their home games at Nottingham Field. They were a member of the Big Sky Conference. They finished the season 2–10, 2–6 in Big Sky play to finish in a five-way tie for ninth place. On November 24, 2019, Earnest Collins Jr. was let go after nine seasons, he finished at Northern Colorado with a record of 28–72.

== Preseason ==
=== Big Sky preseason poll ===
The Big Sky released their preseason media and coaches' polls on July 15, 2019. The Bears were picked to finish in thirteenth place in both polls.

=== Preseason All-Big Sky team ===
The Bears did not have any players selected to the preseason all-Big Sky team.

== Schedule ==
Date	Time	Opponent	Site	TV	Result	Attendance
August 29	8:00 p.m.	at San Jose State*	CEFCU Stadium; San Jose, CA	GSF	L 18–35	13,480
September 7	3:00 p.m.	at No. 22 (FBS) Washington State*	Martin Stadium; Pullman, WA	P12N	L 17–59	27,585
September 14	7:00 p.m.	at Sacramento State*	Hornet Stadium; Sacramento, CA	Pluto TV	L 0–50	6,753
September 21	2:00 p.m.	South Dakota*	Nottingham Field; Greeley, CO	Pluto TV	L 6–14	5,745
September 28	1:05 p.m.	Idaho	Nottingham Field; Greeley, CO	Eleven/Pluto TV	W 27–24	5,373
October 5	5:00 p.m.	at Northern Arizona	Walkup Skydome; Flagstaff, AZ	Pluto TV	L 23–41	10,026
October 12	2:00 p.m.	at Eastern Washington	Roos Field; Cheney, WA	ATTSNRM	L 21–54	9,091
October 19	1:05 p.m.	Portland State^{†}	Nottingham Field; Greeley, CO	Eleven/Pluto TV	L 30–38	4,357
November 2	2:30 p.m.	at Idaho State	Holt Arena; Pocatello, ID	Pluto TV	W 26–20	5,369
November 9	1:05 p.m.	Montana State	Nottingham Field; Greeley, CO	Eleven/Pluto TV	L 14–45	4,442
November 16	12:00 p.m.	at North Dakota	Alerus Center; Grand Forks, ND	Pluto TV	L 38–45	7,732
November 23	12:05 p.m.	Cal Poly	Nottingham Field; Greeley, CO	Pluto TV	L 21–28	2,854
*Non-conference game; ^{†}Homecoming; Rankings from STATS Poll released prior to the game; All times are in Mountain time

- Source: Schedule

Despite also being a member of the Big Sky, the game at Sacramento State will be a non-conference game and will have no effect on the Big Sky standings.

== Game summaries ==
=== At San Jose State ===
	1	2	3	4	Total
Bears	3	3	9	3	18
Spartans	14	7	7	7	35

=== At Washington State ===
	1	2	3	4	Total
Bears	7	3	0	7	17
No. 22 (FBS) Cougars	14	10	21	14	59

=== At Sacramento State ===
	1	2	3	4	Total
Bears	0	0	0	0	0
Hornets	7	15	21	7	50

=== South Dakota ===
	1	2	3	4	Total
Coyotes	0	7	0	7	14
Bears	0	0	6	0	6

=== Idaho ===
	1	2	3	4	Total
Vandals	3	14	7	0	24
Bears	0	7	10	10	27

=== At Northern Arizona ===
	1	2	3	4	Total
Bears	3	10	7	3	23
Lumberjacks	0	10	24	7	41

=== At Eastern Washington ===
	1	2	3	4	Total
Bears	0	0	14	7	21
Eagles	10	30	14	0	54

=== Portland State ===
	1	2	3	4	Total
Vikings	10	14	7	7	38
Bears	0	14	10	6	30

=== At Idaho State ===
	1	2	3	4	Total
Bears	6	6	6	8	26
Bengals	0	10	7	3	20

=== Montana State ===
	1	2	3	4	Total
Bobcats	7	17	14	7	45
Bears	7	0	0	7	14

=== At North Dakota ===
	1	2	3	4	Total
Bears	7	14	10	7	38
Fighting Hawks	14	17	14	0	45

=== Cal Poly ===
	1	2	3	4	Total
Mustangs	0	7	7	14	28
Bears	7	7	7	0	21
