= 2019 Southern Utah Thunderbirds football team =

American college football season

2019 Southern Utah Thunderbirds football
- Conference: Big Sky Conference
- Record: 3–9 (2–6 Big Sky)
- Head coach: Demario Warren (4th season)
- Offensive coordinator: Justin Walterscheid (4th season)
- Defensive coordinator: Brandon Fisher (1st season)
- Home stadium: Eccles Coliseum

2019 Big Sky Conference football standings
	Conf.			Overall
Team	W		L	W		L
No. 3 Weber State +^	7	–	1	11	–	4
No. 9 Sacramento State +^	7	–	1	9	–	4
No. 4 Montana State ^	6	–	2	11	–	4
No. 6 Montana ^	6	–	2	10	–	4
Eastern Washington	6	–	2	7	–	5
Idaho	3	–	5	5	–	7
Portland State	3	–	5	5	–	7
UC Davis	3	–	5	5	–	7
Northern Arizona	2	–	6	4	–	8
Cal Poly	2	–	6	3	–	8
Idaho State	2	–	6	3	–	9
Southern Utah	2	–	6	3	–	9
Northern Colorado	2	–	6	2	–	10
+ – Conference co-champions; ^ – FCS playoff participant; Although North Dakota was classified as an independent, games against them still counted as Big Sky Conference games.; Rankings from STATS Poll

The 2019 Southern Utah Thunderbirds football team represented Southern Utah University in the 2019 NCAA Division I FCS football season. They were led by fourth-year head coach Demario Warren and played their home games at Eccles Coliseum in Cedar City, Utah as eighth-year members of the Big Sky Conference. They finished the season 3–9, 2–6 in Big Sky play to finish in a five-way tie for ninth place.

== Preseason ==
=== Big Sky preseason poll ===
The Big Sky released their preseason media and coaches' polls on July 15, 2019. The Thunderbirds were picked to finish in eleventh place by the media and in twelfth by the coaches.

=== Preseason All–Big Sky team ===
The Thunderbirds had one player selected to the preseason all-Big Sky team.

Offense

Zach Larsen – C

== Schedule ==
Date	Time	Opponent	Site	TV	Result	Attendance	Source
August 31	8:00 p.m.	at UNLV*	Sam Boyd Stadium; Whitney, NV	Stadium	L 23–56	17,421	
September 7	3:00 p.m.	at No. 11 Northern Iowa*	UNI-Dome; Cedar Falls, IA	ESPN3	L 14–34	9,241	
September 14	6:05 p.m.	Stephen F. Austin*	Eccles Coliseum; Cedar City, UT	Pluto TV	W 45–38 ^{OT}	5,568	
September 21	5:00 p.m.	at No. 3 South Dakota State*	Dana J. Dykhouse Stadium; Brookings, SD	Midco	L 7–43	14,269	
September 28	6:05 p.m.	Cal Poly^{†}	Eccles Coliseum; Cedar City, UT	Pluto TV	L 21–24	7,741	
October 5	3:00 p.m.	at Portland State	Hillsboro Stadium; Hillsboro, OR	Pluto TV	L 31–52	3,222	
October 12	6:00 p.m.	at No. 4 Weber State	Stewart Stadium; Ogden, UT (Beehive Bowl)	Pluto TV	L 14–29	10,622	
October 19	6:05 p.m.	No. 23 UC Davis	Eccles Coliseum; Cedar City, UT	Pluto TV	L 25–33	3,156	
October 26	2:05 p.m.	Idaho State	Eccles Coliseum; Cedar City, UT	Pluto TV	W 59–34	3,809	
November 2	12:00 p.m.	at No. 14 Montana State	Bobcat Stadium; Bozeman, MT	RTNW	L 7–42	15,617	
November 16	2:05 p.m.	Northern Arizona	Eccles Coliseum; Cedar City, UT (Grand Canyon Rivalry)	Pluto TV	W 31–30	3,711	
November 23	12:00 p.m.	at North Dakota	Alerus Center; Grand Forks, ND	Pluto TV	L 18–36	7,485	
*Non-conference game; ^{†}Homecoming; Rankings from STATS Poll released prior to the game; All times are in Mountain time

== Game summaries ==
=== At UNLV ===
	1	2	3	4	Total
Thunderbirds	0	7	0	16	23
Rebels	7	28	21	0	56

=== At Northern Iowa ===
	1	2	3	4	Total
Thunderbirds	0	0	7	7	14
No. 11 Panthers	7	17	10	0	34

=== Stephen F. Austin ===
	1	2	3	4	OT	Total
Lumberjacks	0	17	7	14	0	38
Thunderbirds	10	7	7	14	7	45

=== At South Dakota State ===
	1	2	3	4	Total
Thunderbirds	0	7	0	0	7
No. 3 Jackrabbits	7	14	15	7	43

=== Cal Poly ===
	1	2	3	4	Total
Mustangs	3	14	0	7	24
Thunderbirds	0	7	6	8	21

=== At Portland State ===
	1	2	3	4	Total
Thunderbirds	0	10	7	14	31
Vikings	10	28	7	7	52

=== At Weber State ===
	1	2	3	4	Total
Thunderbirds	0	7	0	7	14
No. 4 Wildcats	0	7	7	15	29

=== UC Davis ===
	1	2	3	4	Total
No. 23 Aggies	12	14	7	0	33
Thunderbirds	0	7	0	18	25

=== Idaho State ===
	1	2	3	4	Total
Bengals	14	6	0	14	34
Thunderbirds	28	3	14	14	59

=== At Montana State ===
	1	2	3	4	Total
Thunderbirds	0	0	0	7	7
No. 14 Bobcats	21	21	0	0	42

=== Northern Arizona ===
	1	2	3	4	Total
Lumberjacks	3	17	7	3	30
Thunderbirds	3	14	14	0	31

=== At North Dakota ===
	1	2	3	4	Total
Thunderbirds	0	15	3	0	18
Fighting Hawks	7	10	10	9	36
