= 2019 UC Davis Aggies football team =

American college football season

2019 UC Davis Aggies football
- Conference: Big Sky Conference
- Record: 5–7 (3–5 Big Sky)
- Head coach: Dan Hawkins (3rd season)
- Offensive coordinator: Tim Plough (3rd season)
- Defensive coordinator: Robert Tucker (3rd season)
- Home stadium: UC Davis Health Stadium

2019 Big Sky Conference football standings
	Conf.			Overall
Team	W		L	W		L
No. 3 Weber State +^	7	–	1	11	–	4
No. 9 Sacramento State +^	7	–	1	9	–	4
No. 4 Montana State ^	6	–	2	11	–	4
No. 6 Montana ^	6	–	2	10	–	4
Eastern Washington	6	–	2	7	–	5
Idaho	3	–	5	5	–	7
Portland State	3	–	5	5	–	7
UC Davis	3	–	5	5	–	7
Northern Arizona	2	–	6	4	–	8
Cal Poly	2	–	6	3	–	8
Idaho State	2	–	6	3	–	9
Southern Utah	2	–	6	3	–	9
Northern Colorado	2	–	6	2	–	10
+ – Conference co-champions; ^ – FCS playoff participant; Although North Dakota was classified as an independent, games against them still counted as Big Sky Conference games.; Rankings from STATS Poll

The 2019 UC Davis football team represented the University of California, Davis as a member of the Big Sky Conference during the 2019 NCAA Division I FCS football season. Led by third-year head coach Dan Hawkins, UC Davis compiled an overall record of 5–6 with a mark of 3–5 in conference play, placing in a three-way tie for sixth in the Big Sky. The Aggies played home games at UC Davis Health Stadium in Davis, California.

== Preseason ==
=== Big Sky preseason poll ===
The Big Sky released their preseason media and coaches' polls on July 15, 2019. The Aggies were picked to finish in second place in both polls.

=== Preseason All–Big Sky team ===
The Aggies had two players selected to the preseason all-Big Sky team.

Offense

Jake Maier – QB

Jared Harrell – WR

== Schedule ==
Date	Time	Opponent	Rank	Site	TV	Result	Attendance
August 31	3:30 p.m.	at California*	No. 5	California Memorial Stadium; Berkeley, CA	P12N	L 13–27	44,168
September 7	2:00 p.m.	at San Diego*	No. 5	Torero Stadium; San Diego, CA	WCC Network via Stadium	W 38–35	2,427
September 14	7:00 p.m.	Lehigh*	No. 5	UC Davis Health Stadium; Davis, CA	Pluto TV	W 41–13	9,908
September 21	12:30 p.m.	at No. 1 North Dakota State*	No. 4	Fargodome; Fargo, ND	ESPN+	L 16–27	18,425
September 28	1:00 p.m.	No. 18 Montana	No. 4	UC Davis Health Stadium; Davis, CA	RTNW	L 20–45	10,011
October 5	11:00 a.m.	at North Dakota	No. 12	Alerus Center; Grand Forks, ND	Pluto TV	L 36–38	8,987
October 12	4:00 p.m.	Cal Poly^{†}	No. 24	UC Davis Health Stadium; Davis, CA (Battle for the Golden Horseshoe)	Eleven	W 48–24	11,194
October 19	5:05 p.m.	at Southern Utah	No. 23	Eccles Coliseum; Cedar City, UT	Pluto TV	W 33–25	3,156
October 26	4:00 p.m.	No. 4 Weber State	No. 22	UC Davis Health Stadium; Davis, CA	Eleven	L 20–36	8,105
November 9	2:05 p.m.	at Portland State		Hillsboro Stadium; Hillsboro, OR	Pluto TV	W 45–28	3,378
November 16	4:00 p.m.	No. 10 Montana State		UC Davis Health Stadium; Davis, CA	Eleven	L 17–27	8,284
November 23	2:00 p.m.	at No. 4 Sacramento State		Hornet Stadium; Sacramento, CA (Causeway Classic)	Pluto TV	L 17–27	19,882
*Non-conference game; ^{†}Homecoming; Rankings from STATS Poll released prior to the game; All times are in Pacific time

== Game summaries ==
=== At California ===
	1	2	3	4	Total
No. 5 Aggies	10	0	3	0	13
Golden Bears	0	13	7	7	27

=== At San Diego ===
	1	2	3	4	Total
No. 5 Aggies	14	7	7	10	38
Toreros	7	7	14	7	35

=== Lehigh ===
	1	2	3	4	Total
Mountain Hawks	0	0	0	13	13
No. 5 Aggies	14	7	13	7	41

=== At North Dakota State ===
	1	2	3	4	Total
No. 4 Aggies	7	6	3	0	16
No. 1 Bison	7	10	3	7	27

=== Montana ===
	1	2	3	4	Total
No. 18 Grizzlies	7	10	21	7	45
No. 4 Aggies	0	7	7	6	20

=== At North Dakota ===
	1	2	3	4	Total
No. 12 Aggies	0	14	14	8	36
Fighting Hawks	14	14	7	3	38

=== Cal Poly ===
	1	2	3	4	Total
Mustangs	0	10	7	7	24
No. 24 Aggies	24	10	0	14	48

=== At Southern Utah ===
	1	2	3	4	Total
No. 23 Aggies	12	14	7	0	33
Thunderbirds	0	7	0	18	25

=== Weber State ===
	1	2	3	4	Total
No. 4 Wildcats	7	9	10	10	36
No. 22 Aggies	7	0	7	6	20

=== At Portland State ===
	1	2	3	4	Total
Aggies	7	10	7	21	45
Vikings	0	14	7	7	28

=== Montana State ===
	1	2	3	4	Total
No. 10 Bobcats	7	7	0	13	27
Aggies	0	10	7	0	17

=== At Sacramento State ===
	1	2	3	4	Total
Aggies	7	10	0	0	17
No. 4 Hornets	3	7	3	14	27

== Ranking movements ==
Ranking movements Legend: ██ Increase in ranking ██ Decrease in ranking RV = Received votes
	Week													
Poll	Pre	1	2	3	4	5	6	7	8	9	10	11	12	Final
STATS FCS	5	5	5	4	4	12	24	23	22	RV				
Coaches	5	4	4	4	5	12	21	22	22	RV				
