= 2019 Eastern Washington Eagles football team =

American college football season

2019 Eastern Washington Eagles football
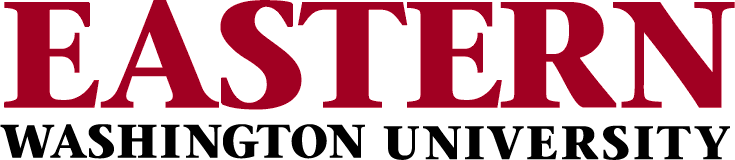
- Conference: Big Sky Conference
- Record: 7–5 (6–2 Big Sky)
- Head coach: Aaron Best (3rd season)
- Offensive coordinator: Ian Shoemaker (1st season)
- Offensive scheme: Multiple
- Defensive coordinator: Eti Ena (1st season)
- Base defense: 4-2-5
- Home stadium: Roos Field

2019 Big Sky Conference football standings
	Conf.			Overall
Team	W		L	W		L
No. 3 Weber State +^	7	–	1	11	–	4
No. 9 Sacramento State +^	7	–	1	9	–	4
No. 4 Montana State ^	6	–	2	11	–	4
No. 6 Montana ^	6	–	2	10	–	4
Eastern Washington	6	–	2	7	–	5
Idaho	3	–	5	5	–	7
Portland State	3	–	5	5	–	7
UC Davis	3	–	5	5	–	7
Northern Arizona	2	–	6	4	–	8
Cal Poly	2	–	6	3	–	8
Idaho State	2	–	6	3	–	9
Southern Utah	2	–	6	3	–	9
Northern Colorado	2	–	6	2	–	10
+ – Conference co-champions; ^ – FCS playoff participant; Although North Dakota was classified as an independent, games against them still counted as Big Sky Conference games.; Rankings from STATS Poll

The 2019 Eastern Washington Eagles football team represented Eastern Washington University in the 2019 NCAA Division I FCS football season. The team was coached by third year head coach Aaron Best. The Eagles played their home games at Roos Field in Cheney, Washington and were a member of the Big Sky Conference. They finished the season 7–5, 6–2 in Big Sky play to finish in a three-way tie for third place.

== Preseason ==
=== Polls ===
On July 15, 2019, during the Big Sky Kickoff in Spokane, Washington, the Eagles were predicted to win the Big Sky by both the coaches and media.

=== Preseason All-Conference Team ===
The Eagles had one player selected to the Preseason All-Conference Team.

Chris Schlichting – Sr. OT

=== Award watch lists ===
Award	Player	Position	Year
Walter Payton Award	Eric Barriere	QB	JR

=== Coaching and personnel changes ===
On January 18, defensive coordinator Jeff Schmedding left to take a position as linebackers coach/co-special teams coordinator with Boise State. Defensive line coach Eti Ena was promoted to replace Schmedding on January 23, 2019.

On February 9, former starting quarterback Gage Gubrud was granted a medical redshirt year by the NCAA after suffering a season-ending foot injury in a game against Montana State on September 29, 2018. He transferred to Washington State for his final year of eligibility.

On February 12, offensive coordinator Bodie Reeder left to become the co-offensive coordinator at North Texas. On February 25, Central Washington head coach Ian Shoemaker was hired to replace him.

== Schedule ==
EWU has scheduled 12 games in the 2019 season instead of the 11 normally allowed for FCS programs. Under a standard provision of NCAA rules, all FCS teams are allowed to schedule 12 regular-season games in years in which the period starting with Labor Day weekend and ending with the last Saturday of November contains 14 Saturdays.

Date	Time	Opponent	Rank	Site	TV	Result	Attendance
August 31	12:00 p.m.	at No. 13 (FBS) Washington*	No. 4	Husky Stadium; Seattle, WA	P12N	L 14–47	65,709
September 7	1:00 p.m.	Lindenwood*	No. 4	Roos Field; Cheney, WA	SWX	W 59–31	6,785
September 14	1:00 p.m.	at No. 17 Jacksonville State*	No. 4	Burgess–Snow Field at JSU Stadium; Jacksonville, AL	ESPN+	L 45–49	20,901
September 21	12:00 p.m.	at Idaho*	No. 11	Kibbie Dome; Moscow, ID	RTNW	L 27–35	6,567
September 28	2:05 p.m.	North Dakota	No. 21	Roos Field; Cheney, WA	SWX	W 35–20	8,726
October 5	6:05 p.m.	at Sacramento State	No. 22	Hornet Stadium; Sacramento, CA	ELVN	L 27–48	9,640
October 12	1:05 p.m.	Northern Colorado		Roos Field; Cheney, WA	RTNW	W 54–21	9,091
October 26	11:05 a.m.	at No. 10 Montana		Washington–Grizzly Stadium; Missoula, MT (EWU–UM Governors Cup)	RTNW	L 17–34	24,072
November 2	1:05 p.m.	Northern Arizona		Roos Field; Cheney, WA	SWX	W 66–38	8,602
November 9	1:35 p.m.	at Idaho State		Holt Arena; Pocatello, ID	Pluto TV	W 48–5	5,377
November 16	5:05 p.m.	at Cal Poly		Alex G. Spanos Stadium; San Luis Obispo, CA	Pluto TV	W 42–41	6,582
November 23	1:05 p.m.	Portland State		Roos Field; Cheney, WA (The Dam Cup)	SWX	W 53–46	8,629
*Non-conference game; Rankings from STATS FCS Poll released prior to game Poll released prior to the game; All times are in Pacific time

- Source: Schedule

Despite also being a member of the Big Sky, the game vs. Idaho will count as a non-conference game and will have no effect on the Big Sky standings.

Although North Dakota is classified as an FCS Independent, games against them still count as Big Sky conference games through the 2019 season.

== Game summaries ==
=== At Washington ===
Eastern Washington at Washington – Game summary

Quarter	1	2	3	4	Total
No. 4 Eagles	0	7	0	7	14
No. 13 (FBS) Huskies	21	7	14	5	47

at Husky Stadium • Seattle, WA

- Date: August 31, 2019
- Game time: 12:00 p.m. PDT
- Game weather: 74 °F (23 °C) • Hazy • Wind @ 0 mph (0 km/h)
- Game attendance: 65,709
- Referee: Kevin Mar
- TV announcers (P12N): Ted Robinson, Yogi Roth, and Lewis Johnson

Game information

Top passers

- EWU – Eric Barriere: 21/35, 211 yards, one touchdown
- UW – Jacob Eason: 27/36, 349 yards, four touchdowns

Top rushers

- EWU – Dennis Merritt: 5 attempts, 37 yards
- UW – Richard Newton: 12 attempts, 91 yards, one touchdown

Top receiving

- EWU – Andrew Boston: 6 receptions, 112 yards, one touchdown
- UW – Andre Baccellia: 5 receptions, 84 yards, one touchdown

=== Lindenwood ===
	1	2	3	4	Total
Lions	0	17	14	0	31
No. 4 Eagles	21	10	21	7	59

=== At Jacksonville State ===
	1	2	3	4	Total
No. 4 Eagles	28	7	10	0	45
No. 17 Gamecocks	7	14	7	21	49

=== At Idaho ===
	1	2	3	4	Total
No. 11 Eagles	0	0	7	20	27
Vandals	14	14	0	7	35

=== North Dakota ===
	1	2	3	4	Total
Fighting Hawks	7	0	7	6	20
No. 21 Eagles	14	14	0	7	35

=== At Sacramento State ===
	1	2	3	4	Total
No. 22 Eagles	7	7	6	7	27
Hornets	21	6	7	14	48

=== Northern Colorado ===
	1	2	3	4	Total
Bears	0	0	14	7	21
Eagles	10	30	14	0	54

=== At Montana ===
	1	2	3	4	Total
Eagles	0	14	3	0	17
No. 10 Grizzlies	3	7	10	14	34

=== Northern Arizona ===
	1	2	3	4	Total
Lumberjacks	14	10	7	7	38
Eagles	17	21	21	7	66

=== At Idaho State ===
	1	2	3	4	Total
Eagles	3	17	21	7	48
Bengals	2	0	3	0	5

=== At Cal Poly ===
	1	2	3	4	Total
Eagles	14	14	7	7	42
Mustangs	0	14	14	13	41

=== Portland State ===
	1	2	3	4	Total
Vikings	7	10	8	21	46
Eagles	17	13	15	8	53

== Ranking movements ==
Ranking movements Legend: ██ Increase in ranking ██ Decrease in ranking — = Not ranked RV = Received votes ( ) = First-place votes
	Week													
Poll	Pre	1	2	3	4	5	6	7	8	9	10	11	12	Final
STATS	4 (3)	4 (1)	4	11	21	22	RV	RV	RV	—	—	RV	RV	RV
Coaches	3 (2)	5	5	11	22	21	RV	RV	—	—	—	RV	RV	RV
