= 2019 Idaho State Bengals football team =

American college football season

2019 Idaho State Bengals football
- Conference: Big Sky Conference
- Record: 3–9 (2–6 Big Sky)
- Head coach: Rob Phenicie (3rd season)
- Offensive coordinator: Mike Ferriter (2nd season)
- Defensive coordinator: Roger Cooper (5th season)
- Home stadium: Holt Arena

2019 Big Sky Conference football standings
	Conf.			Overall
Team	W		L	W		L
No. 3 Weber State +^	7	–	1	11	–	4
No. 9 Sacramento State +^	7	–	1	9	–	4
No. 4 Montana State ^	6	–	2	11	–	4
No. 6 Montana ^	6	–	2	10	–	4
Eastern Washington	6	–	2	7	–	5
Idaho	3	–	5	5	–	7
Portland State	3	–	5	5	–	7
UC Davis	3	–	5	5	–	7
Northern Arizona	2	–	6	4	–	8
Cal Poly	2	–	6	3	–	8
Idaho State	2	–	6	3	–	9
Southern Utah	2	–	6	3	–	9
Northern Colorado	2	–	6	2	–	10
+ – Conference co-champions; ^ – FCS playoff participant; Although North Dakota was classified as an independent, games against them still counted as Big Sky Conference games.; Rankings from STATS Poll

The 2019 Idaho State Bengals football team represented Idaho State University as a member of the Big Sky Conference during the 2019 NCAA Division I FCS football season. Led by third-year head coach Rob Phenicie, the Bengals compiled an overall record of 3–9 with a mark of 2–6 in conference play, placing in a five-way tie for ninth in the Big Sky. Idaho State played their home games at Holt Arena in Pocatello, Idaho.

== Preseason ==
=== Big Sky preseason poll ===
The Big Sky released their preseason media and coaches' polls on July 15, 2019. The Bengals were picked to finish in seventh place in both polls.

=== Preseason All–Big Sky team ===
The Bengals had three players selected to the preseason all-Big Sky team.

Offense

Mitch Gueller – WR

Defense

Kody Graves – ILB

Adkin Agguirre – S

== Schedule ==
Date	Time	Opponent	Site	TV	Result	Attendance
September 5	6:35 p.m.	Western Colorado*	Holt Arena; Pocatello, ID	Pluto TV	W 38–13	4,770
September 14	2:15 p.m.	at No. 11 (FBS) Utah*	Rice–Eccles Stadium; Salt Lake City, UT	P12N	L 0–31	45,989
September 21	3:00 p.m.	at No. 9 Northern Iowa*	UNI-Dome; Cedar Falls, IA	ESPN+	L 6–13	8,339
September 28	3:05 p.m.	Portland State	Holt Arena; Pocatello, ID	Pluto TV	W 51–24	6,398
October 5	1:00 p.m.	at No. 8 Montana	Washington–Grizzly Stadium; Missoula, MT	RTNW	L 20–59	25,023
October 12	1:05 p.m.	North Dakota^{†}	Holt Arena; Pocatello, ID	Pluto TV	W 55–20	8,731
October 19	3:30 p.m.	at Idaho	Kibbie Dome; Moscow, ID (rivalry)	RTNW	L 21–45	10,361
October 26	2:05 p.m.	at Southern Utah	Eccles Coliseum; Cedar City, UT	Pluto TV	L 34–59	3,809
November 2	2:30 p.m.	Northern Colorado	Holt Arena; Pocatello, ID	Pluto TV	L 20–26	5,369
November 9	2:30 p.m.	Eastern Washington	Holt Arena; Pocatello, ID	Pluto TV	L 5–48	5,377
November 16	1:00 p.m.	at BYU*	LaVell Edwards Stadium; Provo, UT	BYUtv	L 10–42	57,379
November 23	2:00 p.m.	at No. 6 Weber State	Stewart Stadium; Ogden, UT	Pluto TV	L 10–38	7,623
*Non-conference game; ^{†}Homecoming; Rankings from STATS Poll released prior to the game; All times are in Mountain time

== Game summaries ==
=== Western State ===
	1	2	3	4	Total
Mountaineers	0	3	3	7	13
Bengals	7	7	10	14	38

=== At Utah ===
	1	2	3	4	Total
Bengals	0	0	0	0	0
No. 11 (FBS) Utes	17	7	7	0	31

=== At Northern Iowa ===
	1	2	3	4	Total
Bengals	3	3	0	0	6
No. 9 Panthers	0	3	0	10	13

=== Portland State ===
	1	2	3	4	Total
Vikings	0	10	14	0	24
Bengals	20	21	7	3	51

=== At Montana ===
	1	2	3	4	Total
Bengals	10	7	3	0	20
No. 8 Grizzlies	0	24	14	21	59

=== North Dakota ===
	1	2	3	4	Total
Fighting Hawks	7	0	6	7	20
Bengals	3	28	10	14	55

=== At Idaho ===
	1	2	3	4	Total
Bengals	0	7	14	0	21
Vandals	17	7	21	0	45

=== At Southern Utah ===
	1	2	3	4	Total
Bengals	14	6	0	14	34
Thunderbirds	28	3	14	14	59

=== Northern Colorado ===
	1	2	3	4	Total
Bears	6	6	6	8	26
Bengals	0	10	7	3	20

=== Eastern Washington ===
	1	2	3	4	Total
Eagles	3	17	21	7	48
Bengals	2	0	3	0	5

=== At BYU ===
	1	2	3	4	Total
Bengals	0	3	7	0	10
Cougars	7	21	14	0	42

=== At Weber State ===
	1	2	3	4	Total
Bengals	0	0	3	7	10
No. 6 Wildcats	7	24	7	0	38

== Ranking movements ==
Ranking movements Legend: RV = Received votes
	Week													
Poll	Pre	1	2	3	4	5	6	7	8	9	10	11	12	Final
STATS FCS	RV													
Coaches														
