= UC Davis Health Stadium =

Stadium in University of California, Davis

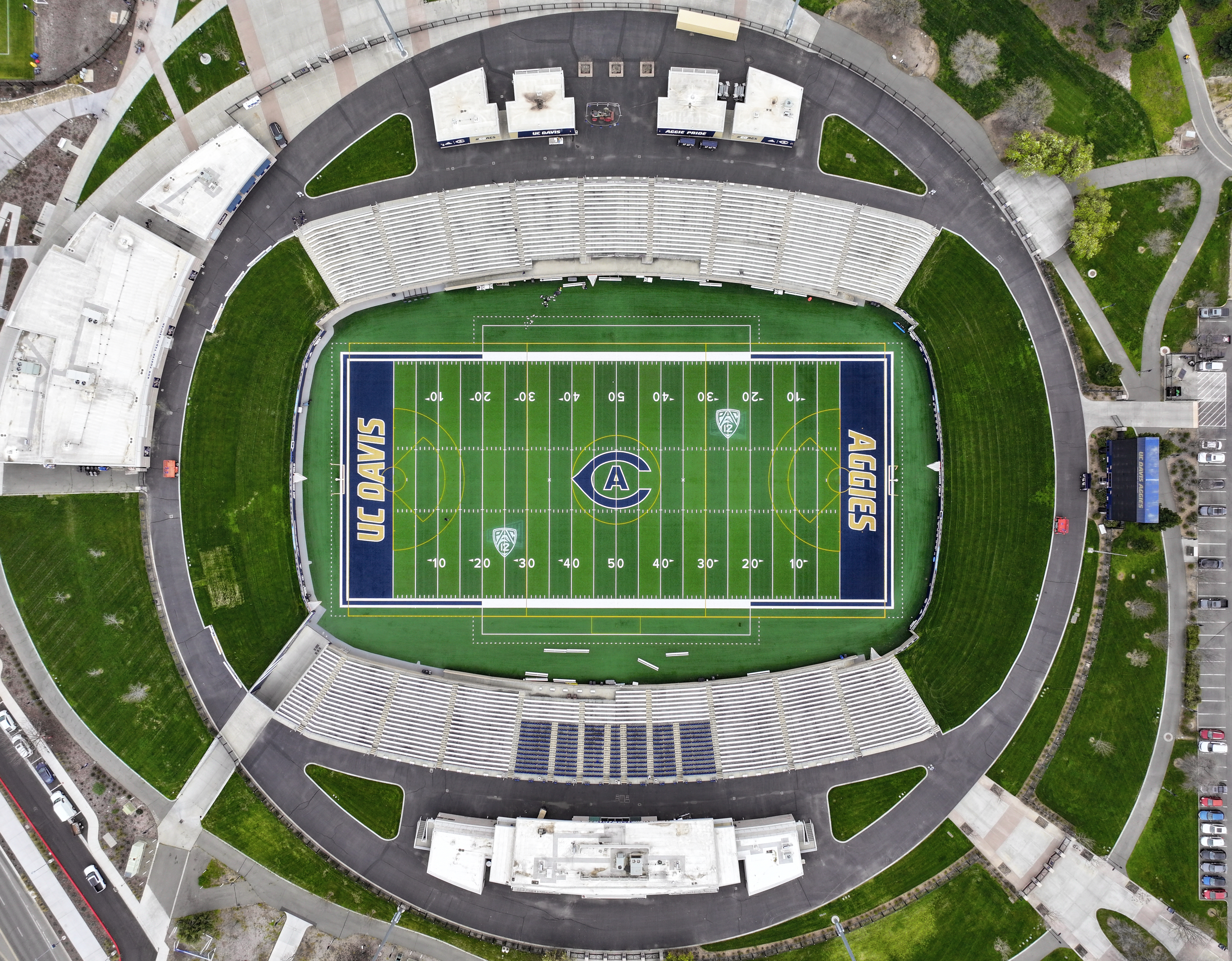
- View from above in 2024

- Location in the United States Location in California
- Interactive map of UC Davis Health Stadium
- Former names: Aggie Stadium (2007–2018)
- Address: 864 La Rue Road
- Location: University of California, Davis; Davis, California, U.S.
- Coordinates: 38°32′11.42″N 121°45′46″W
- Elevation: 55 feet (17 m) AMSL
- Owner: University of California, Davis
- Operator: University of California, Davis
- Capacity: 10,743
- Surface: Shaw Sports Turf
- Record attendance: 17,217 (vs. Southern Utah, September 22, 2025)

Construction
- Groundbreaking: 2005
- Opened: April 1, 2007; 19 years ago
- Cost: $30 million ($46.6 million in 2025)
- Architect: Ellerbe Becket

Tenants
- UC Davis Aggies football (NCAA) (2007–present); UC Davis Aggies women’s lacrosse (NCAA) (2007–present); FC Davis (NPSL) (2018)

UC Davis Health Stadium (also and formerly known as Aggie Stadium) is an outdoor multi-purpose stadium located on the campus of the University of California, Davis in unincorporated Yolo County, California.

Opened as Aggie Stadium on April 1, 2007, the venue currently seats 10,743 for football. It replaced the 10,000 seat Toomey Field and is the home to the UC Davis Aggies football of the Big Sky Conference and women's lacrosse team of the Big 12. Plans call for the stadium to eventually be built out to 30,000 seats.

The artificial turf playing field is named Jim Sochor Field, after the Aggie's College Football Hall of Fame coach of the same name. It is aligned north-south at an approximate elevation of 55 feet (17 m) above sea level.

== History ==
=== Before Aggie Stadium ===
Prior to becoming a Division I school, UC Davis played at various venues throughout Yolo and Sacramento Counties. For several years after the founding of the football program in 1915, the football team played in Sacramento, specifically at Moreing Field and Sacramento Stadium.

In 1932, the Cal Aggies would begin playing home games at A Street Field, near where the current Toomey Field stands. In 1949, a permanent football and track and field stadium would be built, with permanent seating to be 10,011 (expandable to 12,800). The first game, was on November 18th of that year and was a 12-3 victory over Chico State. The record for attendance was set on November 12, 1977, with 12,800 for a 37–21 victory over Nevada. In 1962 the stadium was renamed in honor of Crip Toomey who served as athletic director at UC Davis from 1928 until his death in 1961. The Aggie's all time record at Toomey Field stands was 192–86–7 (.686).

Toomey Field continues to be the home for the UC Davis Aggies Track and Field teams, and alongside UC Davis Health Stadium, is slated to receive a major renovation.

=== New Division, New Stadium ===
The stadium was originally scheduled for completion in time for the 2006 football season, but due to owner requested changes the stadium did not open until 2007.

In the first sporting event held in the new stadium, the UCD women's lacrosse team beat St. Mary's 17–5 on April 1, and Aggie sophomore Patrice Clark scored the first goal. Its first football game was on September 1 against Western Washington; the Aggies lost 28–21.

As part of a partnership with the UC Davis Health System, announced at the Causeway Classic Luncheon on November 15, 2018, the facility was renamed UC Davis Health Stadium on August 1, 2019, for a period of 20 years. Along with this development, renovation plans for a 38,000-square-foot (3,500 m^{2}) student-athlete performance center and practice field, and 16,000 square feet (1,500 m^{2}) of the Bob Foster Team Center, located behind the north end zone, were announced.

In November 2025, UC Davis announced a $50 million renovation to the stadium. The renovation will include six suites, lounge and club seating, and concourse and press box renovations. These renovations also include a new 8,500-square-foot banquet space for 500 guests, with a kitchen, two bars, and restrooms.

== Features ==
The Tavernetti Bell, also known as the "Victory Bell," greets fans entering Aggie Stadium. The bell is named after Thomas Tavernetti (1889–1934) and is rung once for every point scored after an Aggie victory. With the construction of Aggie Stadium, the bell followed from its previous location at Toomey Field.

== Gallery ==
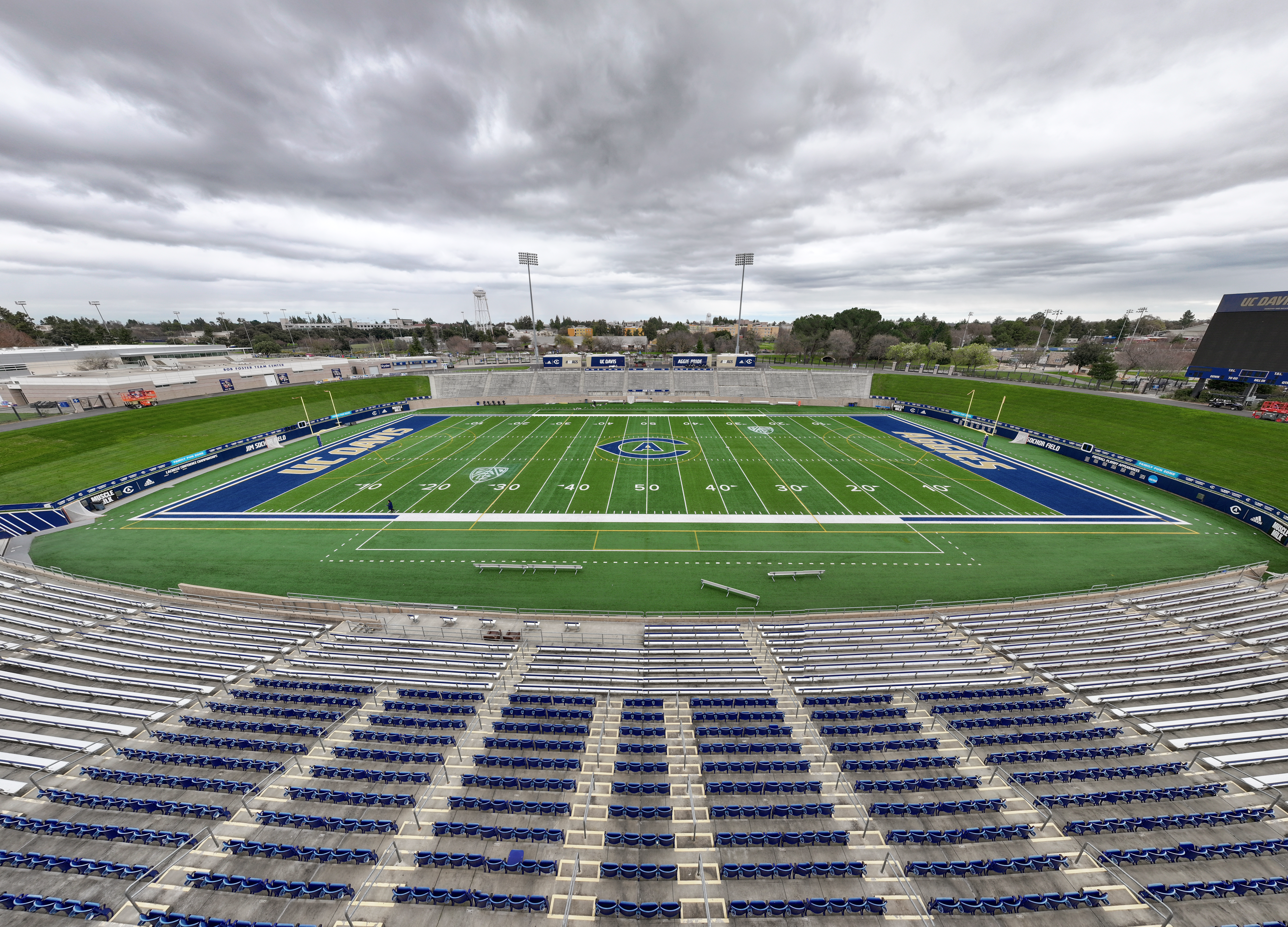
View from press box

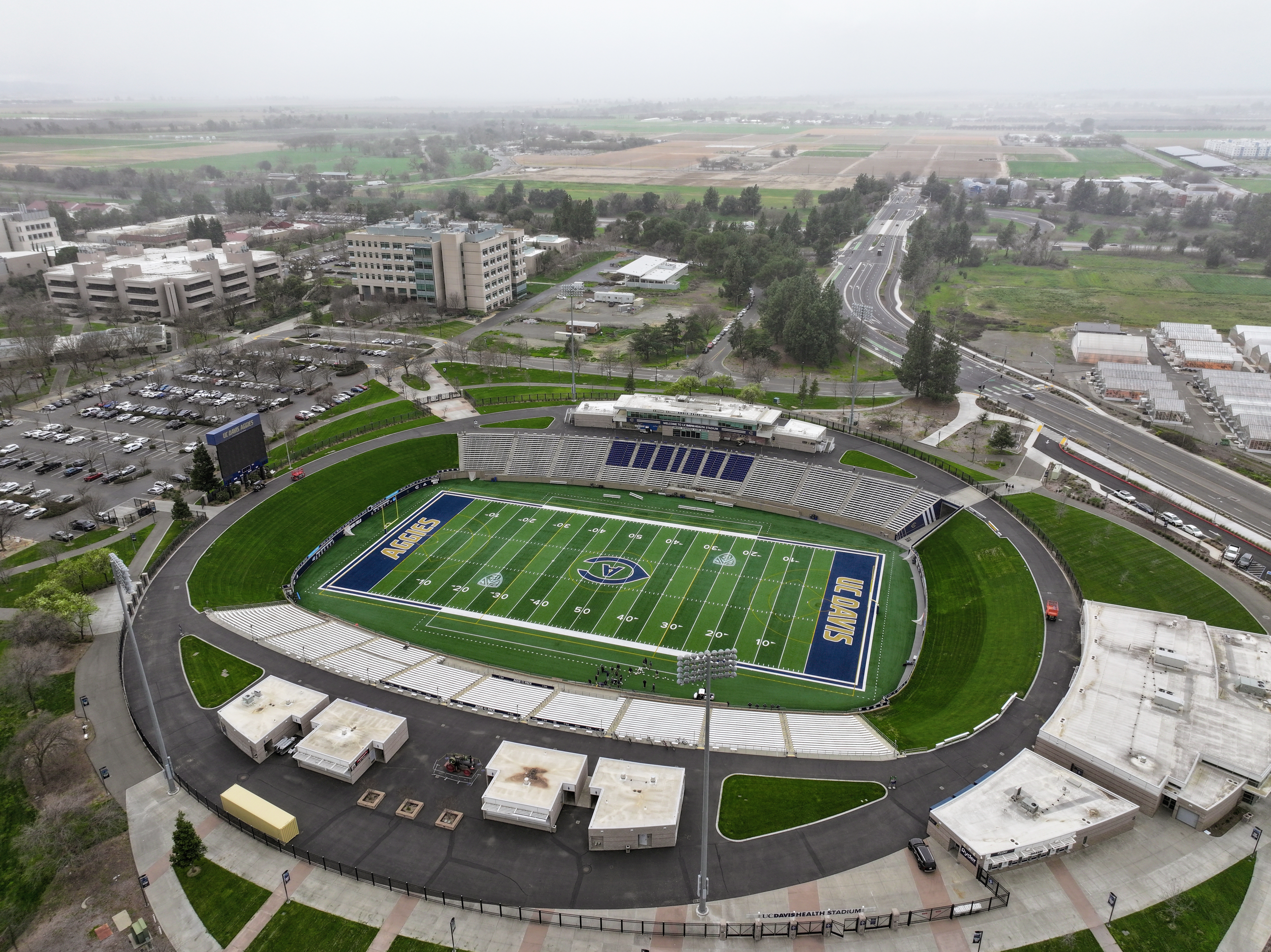
Drone shot

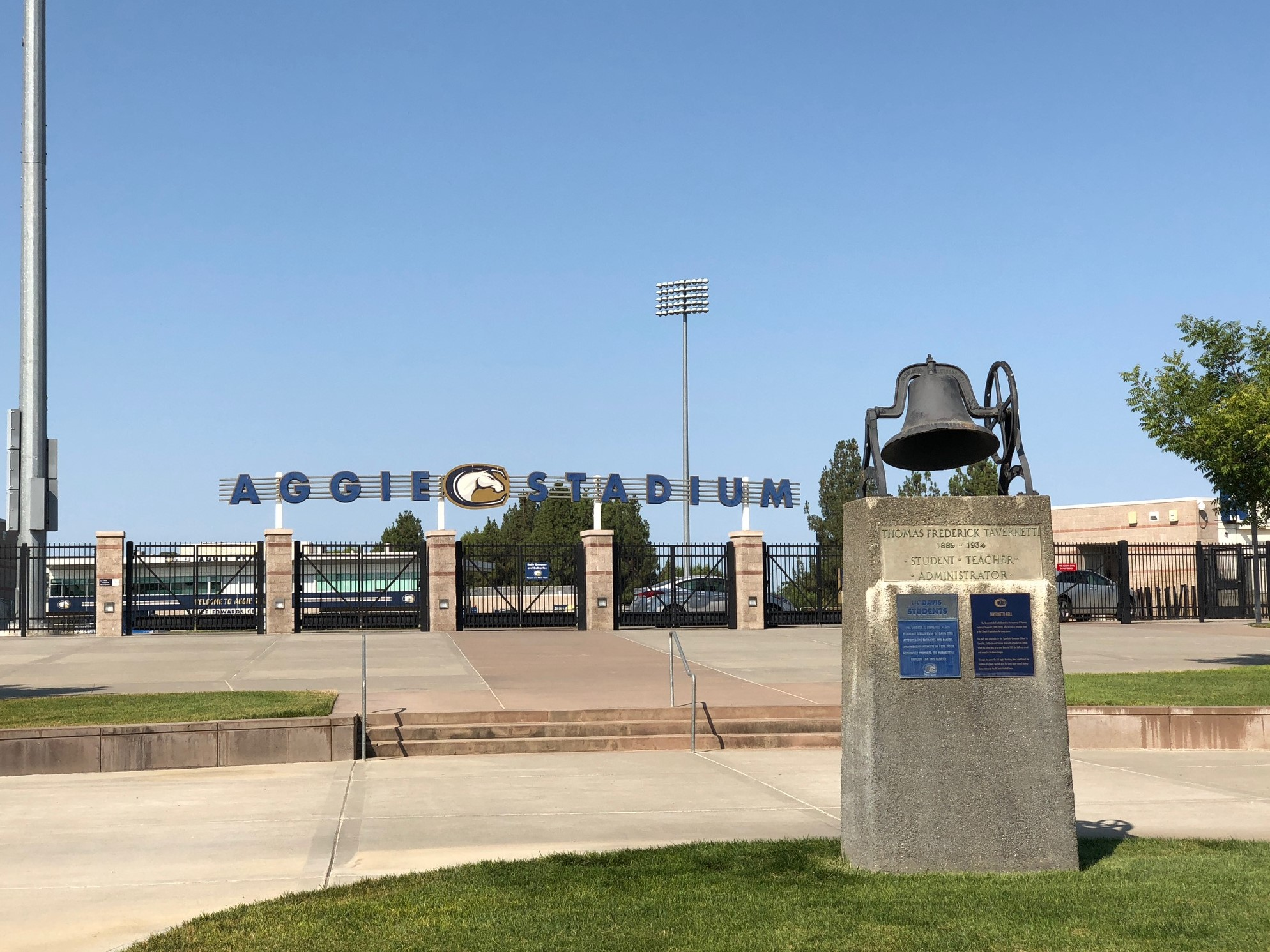
UC Davis Health Stadium entrance

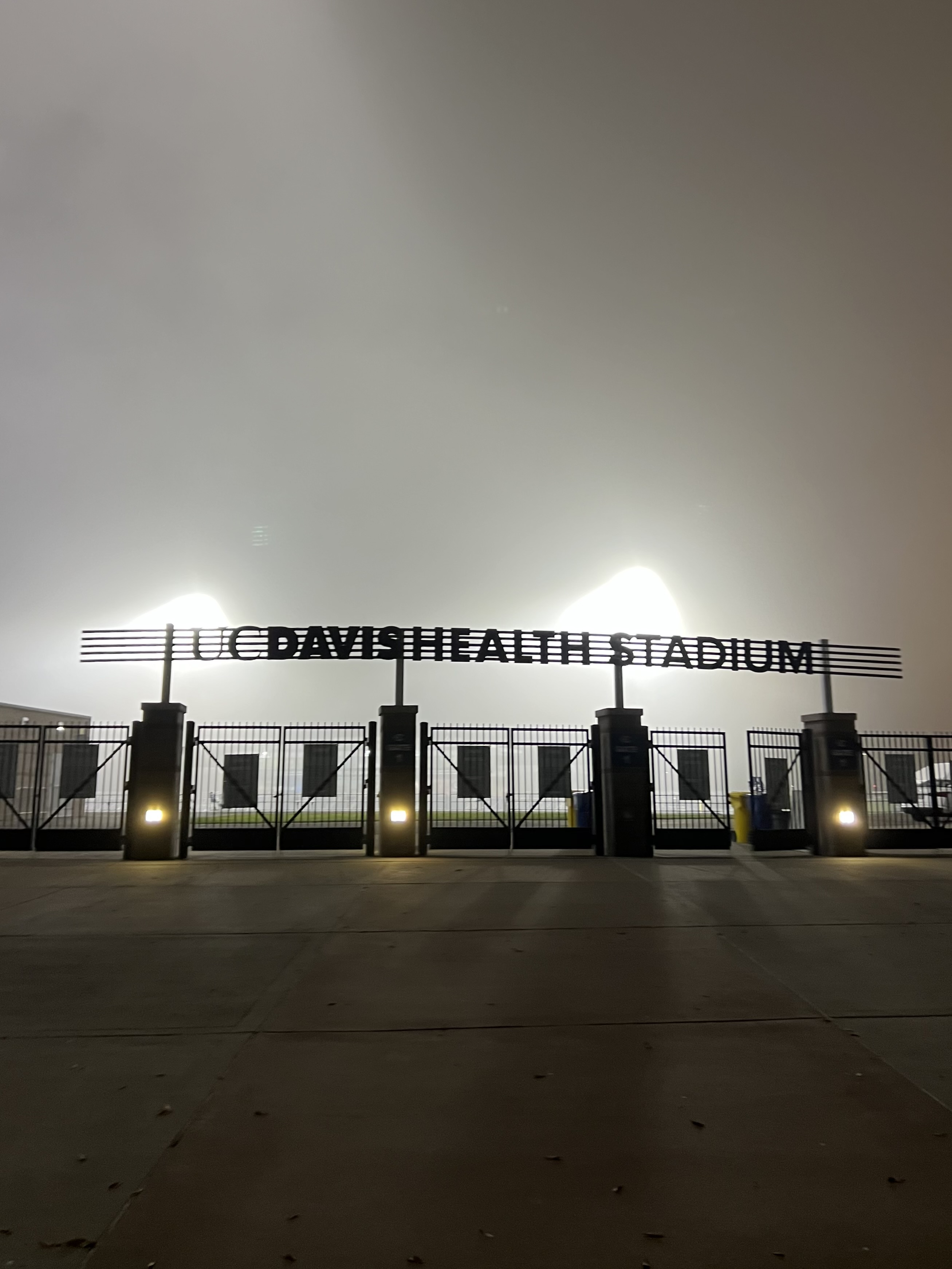
UC Davis Health Stadium entrance with tule fog in December 2025

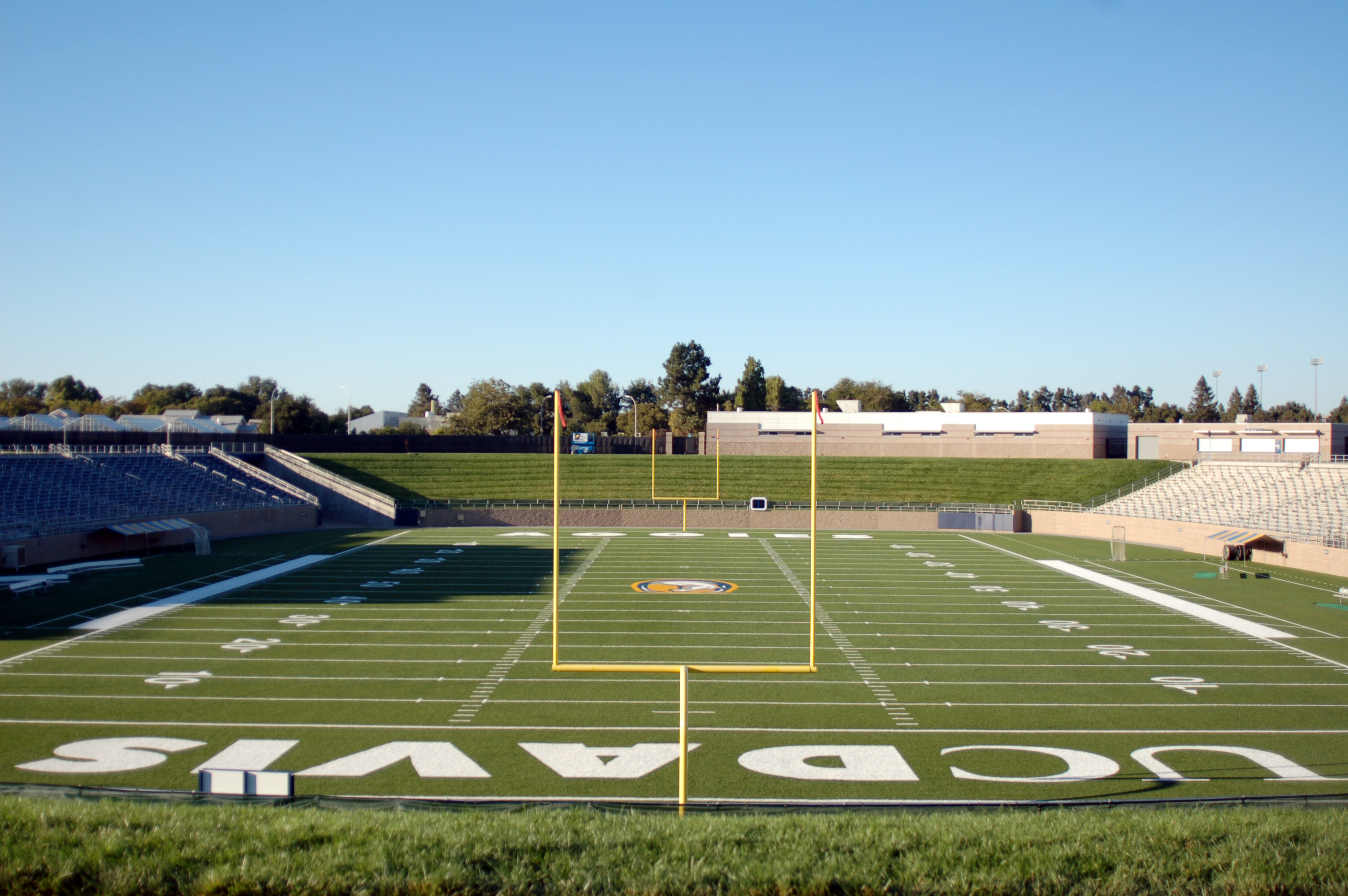
Jim Sochor Field

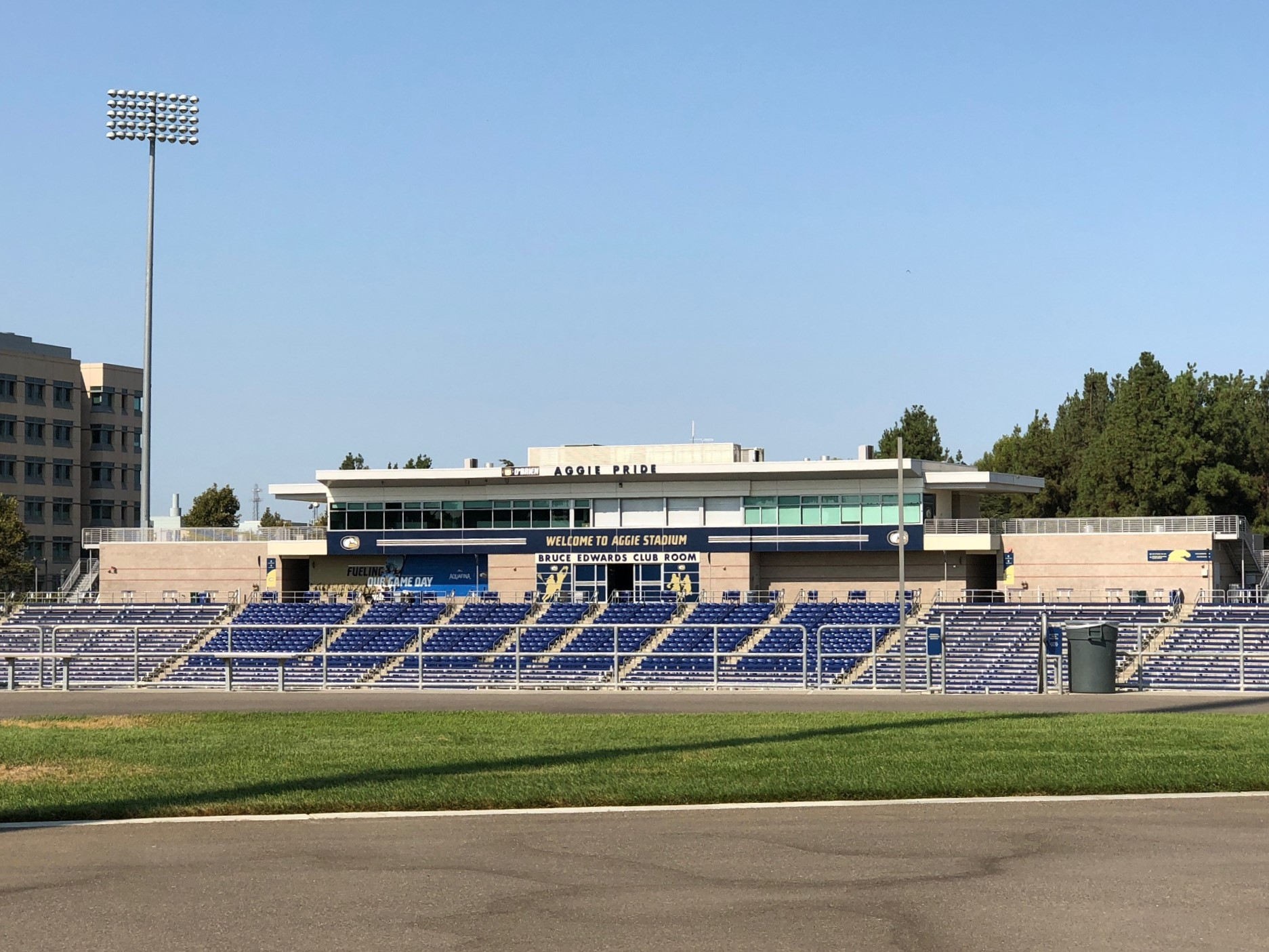
UC Davis Health Stadium press box

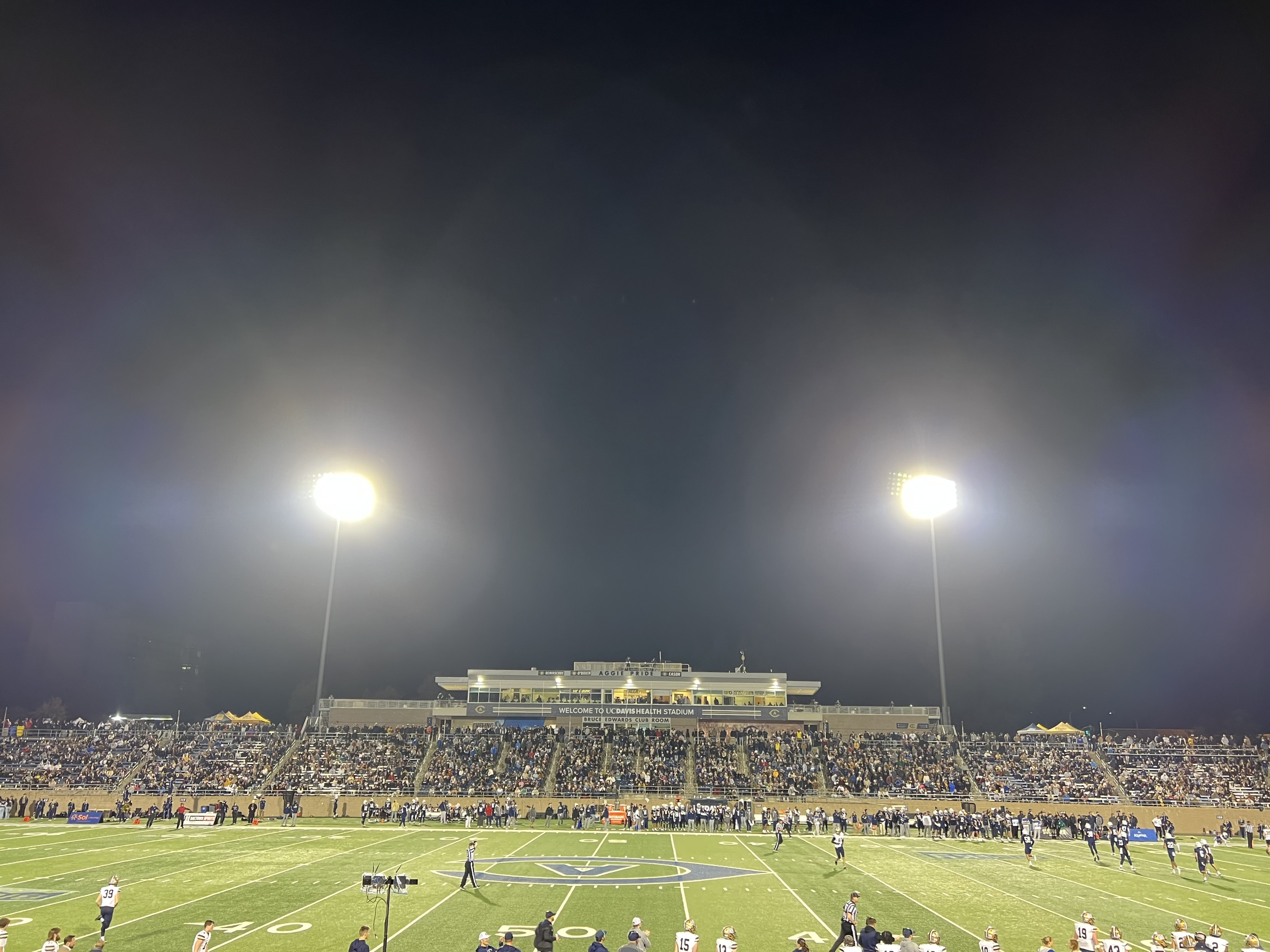
UC Davis vs Montana State during a home game in the 2024 Season

== Attendance records ==
Rank	Attendance	Date	Game Result
1	17,217	September 20, 2025	9 UC Davis 50, Southern Utah 27
2	15,270	September 19, 2026	11 UC Davis 45, Stetson 7
3	14,832	September 21, 2024	13 UC Davis 32, Utah Tech 14
4	14,724	September 23, 2023	15 UC Davis 24, Eastern Washington 27
5	14,590	November 22, 2025	15 UC Davis 31, Sacramento State 27
6	14,394	September 17, 2022	24 UC Davis 43, San Diego 13
7	13,947	November 16, 2024	4 UC Davis 28, 2 Montana State 30
8	12,315	November 20, 2021	10 UC Davis 7, 11 Sacramento State 27
9	12,238	September 27, 2025	9 UC Davis 34, Weber State 12
10^{T}	11,622	October 2, 2021	8 UC Davis 27, Idaho 20
10^{T}	11,622	November 18, 2023	UC Davis 31, 8 Sacramento State 21
12	11,194	October 12, 2019	24 UC Davis 48, Cal Poly 24
13	10,973	November 1, 2025	6 UC Davis 36, Idaho State 38
14	10,963	October 16, 2021	13 UC Davis 32, Northern Colorado 3
15^{T}	10,849	October 13, 2018	14 UC Davis 44, Idaho State 37^{OT}
15^{T}	10,849	November 7, 2009	UC Davis 23, Cal Poly 10
15^{T}	10,849	October 11, 2008	UC Davis 49, Southern Utah 26
18	10,743	October 13, 2007	UC Davis 28, 22 Cal Poly 63
19	10,638	November 2, 2024	4 UC Davis 59, Northern Colorado 7
20	10,515	October 12, 2024	6 UC Davis 56, Cal Poly 10

== See also ==
- List of NCAA Division I FCS football stadiums
