= 2019 North Dakota Fighting Hawks football team =

American college football season

2019 North Dakota Fighting Hawks football

FCS Playoffs First Round, L 6–24 vs. Nicholls
- Conference: Independent
- Record: 7–5
- Head coach: Bubba Schweigert (6th season)
- Offensive coordinator: Danny Freund (1st season)
- Offensive scheme: Pistol
- Defensive coordinator: Eric Schmidt (6th season)
- Base defense: 3–4
- Home stadium: Alerus Center

2019 NCAA Division I FCS independents football standings
	Conf.			Overall
Team	W		L	W		L
North Dakota ^		–		7	–	5
^ – FCS playoff participant

The 2019 North Dakota Fighting Hawks football team represented the University of North Dakota during the 2019 NCAA Division I FCS football season. Led by sixth-year head coach Bubba Schweigert, they played their home games at the Alerus Center. They finished the season 7–5. They received an at-large bid to the FCS Playoffs, where they would lose to Nicholls in the first round.

The Fighting Hawks left the Big Sky Conference in 2018 to join the non-football Summit League, with the football program joining the Missouri Valley Football Conference in 2020. Although being classified as an independent for football in 2018 and 2019, they continued to play a full Big Sky schedule, and their games counted in the conference standings for their opponents. The Fighting Hawks were ineligible to win the conference championship.

== Schedule ==
Date	Time	Opponent	Rank	Site	TV	Result	Attendance
August 31	4:00 p.m.	Drake		Alerus Center; Grand Forks, ND	Pluto TV	W 47–7	8,545
September 7	2:30 p.m.	at No. 1 North Dakota State		Fargodome; Fargo, ND (Nickel Trophy)	ESPN+	L 7–38	18,923
September 14	4:00 p.m.	No. 24 Sam Houston State		Alerus Center; Grand Forks, ND	Pluto TV	W 27–23	8,697
September 28	4:05 p.m.	at No. 21 Eastern Washington		Roos Field; Cheney, WA	Pluto TV	L 20–35	8,726
October 5	1:00 p.m.	No. 12 UC Davis^{†}		Alerus Center; Grand Forks, ND	Pluto TV	W 38–36	8,987
October 12	2:05 p.m.	at Idaho State		Holt Arena; Pocatello, ID	Pluto TV	L 20–55	8,731
October 19	7:05 p.m.	at Cal Poly		Alex G. Spanos Stadium; San Luis Obispo, CA	Pluto TV	W 30–26	5,186
October 26	12:00 p.m.	No. 9 Montana State		Alerus Center; Grand Forks, ND	Pluto TV	W 16–12	8,594
November 9	3:00 p.m.	at No. 3 Weber State	No. 22	Stewart Stadium; Ogden, UT	Pluto TV	L 27–30	9,622
November 16	1:00 p.m.	Northern Colorado		Alerus Center; Grand Forks, ND	Pluto TV	W 45–38	7,732
November 23	1:00 p.m.	Southern Utah		Alerus Center; Grand Forks, ND	Pluto TV	W 36–18	7,485
November 30	3:00 p.m.	at No. 19 Nicholls	No. 24	John L. Guidry Stadium; Thibodaux, LA (NCAA Division I First Round)	ESPN3	L 6–24	7,569
^{†}Homecoming; Rankings from STATS Poll released prior to the game; All times are in Central time

== Game summaries ==
=== Drake ===
	1	2	3	4	Total
Bulldogs	0	0	7	0	7
Fighting Hawks	10	2	21	14	47

=== At North Dakota State ===
	1	2	3	4	Total
Fighting Hawks	0	7	0	0	7
No. 1 Bison	14	7	10	7	38

=== Sam Houston State ===
	1	2	3	4	Total
No. 24 Bearkats	0	14	0	9	23
Fighting Hawks	14	0	13	0	27

=== At Eastern Washington ===
	1	2	3	4	Total
Fighting Hawks	7	0	7	6	20
No. 21 Eagles	14	14	0	7	35

=== UC Davis ===
	1	2	3	4	Total
Aggies	0	14	14	8	36
Fighting Hawks	14	14	7	3	38

=== At Idaho State ===
	1	2	3	4	Total
Fighting Hawks	7	0	6	7	20
Bengals	3	28	10	14	55

=== At Cal Poly ===
	1	2	3	4	Total
Fighting Hawks	0	7	14	9	30
Mustangs	3	14	6	3	26

=== Montana State ===
	1	2	3	4	Total
No. 9 Bobcats	3	3	0	6	12
Fighting Hawks	7	0	3	6	16

=== At Weber State ===
	1	2	3	4	Total
No. 22 Fighting Hawks	7	10	7	3	27
No. 3 Wildcats	14	6	0	10	30

=== Northern Colorado ===
	1	2	3	4	Total
Bears	7	14	10	7	38
Fighting Hawks	14	17	14	0	45

=== Southern Utah ===
	1	2	3	4	Total
Thunderbirds	0	15	3	0	18
Fighting Hawks	7	10	10	9	36

== FCS Playoffs ==
The Fighting Hawks were selected for the postseason tournament, with a first-round pairing against Nicholls.

=== At Nicholls–First Round ===
	1	2	3	4	Total
No. 24 Fighting Hawks	0	3	3	0	6
No. 19 Colonels	3	7	7	7	24

== Ranking movements ==
Ranking movements Legend: ██ Increase in ranking ██ Decrease in ranking — = Not ranked RV = Received votes
	Week														
Poll	Pre	1	2	3	4	5	6	7	8	9	10	11	12	13	Final
STATS FCS	RV	RV	—	RV	RV	RV	RV	RV	RV	24	22	RV	RV	24	
Coaches	RV	RV	RV	RV	25	RV	RV	—	RV	23	22	RV	RV	RV	
