= 2019 VMI Keydets football team =

Virginia Military Institute in the 2019 NCAA Division I FCS football season

2019 VMI Keydets football
- Conference: Southern Conference
- Record: 5–7 (4–4 SoCon)
- Head coach: Scott Wachenheim (5th season)
- Offensive coordinator: Brian Sheppard (2nd season)
- Defensive coordinator: Tom Clark (5th season)
- Base defense: 3–4
- Home stadium: Alumni Memorial Field

2019 Southern Conference football standings
	Conf.			Overall
Team	W		L	W		L
No. 16 Wofford $^	7	–	1	8	–	3
No. 21 Furman ^	6	–	2	8	–	4
Chattanooga	5	–	3	6	–	6
The Citadel	4	–	4	6	–	6
Samford	4	–	4	5	–	7
VMI	4	–	4	5	–	7
Mercer	3	–	5	4	–	8
Western Carolina	2	–	6	3	–	9
East Tennessee State	1	–	7	3	–	9
$ – Conference champion; ^ – FCS playoff participant; Rankings from STATS Poll

The 2019 VMI Keydets football team represented the Virginia Military Institute in the 2019 NCAA Division I FCS football season. It was VMI's 129th football season. The Keydets were led by fifth-year head coach Scott Wachenheim. They played their home games at 10,000–seat Alumni Memorial Field at Foster Stadium. They were a member of the Southern Conference (SoCon). They finished the season 5–7, 4–4 in SoCon play to finish in a three-way tie for fourth place. Their 5 wins were the most achieved in a single season since finishing 6–6 in 2003.

== Preseason ==
=== Preseason media and coaches polls ===
The SoCon released their preseason media poll and coaches poll on July 22, 2019. The Keydets were picked to finish in ninth place in both polls.

=== Preseason All-SoCon teams ===
The Keydets placed four players on the preseason all–SoCon teams.

Offense

1st team

Javeon Lara – WR

2nd team

Reece Udinski – QB

Defense

1st team

A.J. Smith – DB

Specialists

2nd team

Rohan Martin – RS

== Schedule ==
Date	Time	Opponent	Site	TV	Result	Attendance
August 31	6:30 p.m.	at Marshall*	Joan C. Edwards Stadium; Huntington, WV	Stadium	L 17–56	23,875
September 7	1:30 p.m.	Mars Hill*	Alumni Memorial Field; Lexington, VA	ESPN3	W 63–21	3,484
September 14	7:30 p.m.	at East Tennessee State	William B. Greene Jr. Stadium; Johnson City, TN	ESPN+	W 31–24 ^{OT}	9,150
September 21	1:30 p.m.	Robert Morris*	Alumni Memorial Field; Lexington, VA	ESPN+	L 21–31	3,900
September 28	1:30 p.m.	Wofford	Alumni Memorial Field; Lexington, VA	ESPN+	L 36–51	3,300
October 5	2:00 p.m.	at The Citadel	Johnson Hagood Stadium; Charleston, SC (Military Classic of the South)	ESPN+	W 34–21	12,126
October 12	1:30 p.m.	Samford	Alumni Memorial Field; Lexington, VA	ESPN+	W 48–41 ^{OT}	5,300
October 19	3:00 p.m.	at Mercer	Five Star Stadium; Macon, GA	ESPN+	L 27–34	5,714
November 2	1:30 p.m.	Western Carolina	Alumni Memorial Field; Lexington, VA	ESPN+	L 35–43	4,568
November 9	1:00 p.m.	at No. 9 Furman	Paladin Stadium; Greenville, SC	ESPN+	L 21–60	7,229
November 16	12:00 p.m.	at Army*	Michie Stadium; West Point, NY	CBSSN	L 6–47	25,747
November 23	1:00 p.m.	Chattanooga	Alumni Memorial Field; Lexington, VA	ESPN3	W 31–24	3,576
*Non-conference game; Rankings from STATS Poll released prior to the game; All times are in Eastern time

== Projected depth chart ==
Defense

FS
A.J. Smith
Tim Smith

OLB	ILB	ILB	OLB
Tyren Cloyd	Elliott Brewster	Liam Kauthen	Ethan Casselberry
Connor Riddle	Carter Johnson	Brett Howell	Aljareek Malry

S
Josh Sarratt
DJ Dennis

CB
Kaleb Tucker
Will Bunton

DE	NT	DE
Jarrod Richmond	Warren Dabney	Jordan Ward
Chuck Weatherman	Eric Weaver	Ryan Clark

CB
Riuq Trotman
Tamar Teague

Offense

WR
Javeon Lara
Christopher Owens

WR
Jakob Herres
Leroy Thomas

LT	LG	C	RG	RT
Marshall Gill	Nick Hartnett	Brad Davis	Josh Andre	Critt Johnson
Jarvis Chandler	Sawaar Canady	Aaron Gallagher	Jacob Peace	Shane Strand

TE
Colby Rider
Tristan Mann

WR
Rohan Martin
Max Brimigion

QB
Reece Udinski
Chance Newman

RB
Alex Ramsey
Tyain Smith

Special teams
PK Grant Clemons
PK Camden Murphy
P Reed King
P Aaron Vardell
KR Leroy Thomas
PR Rohan Martin
LS Robert Soderholm
H Reed King

== Game summaries ==
=== At Marshall ===
VMI Keydets at Marshall Thundering Herd

Quarter	1	2	3	4	Total
Keydets	0	7	0	10	17
Thundering Herd	14	21	14	7	56

at Joan C. Edwards Stadium, Huntington, WV

- Date: August 31, 2019
- Game time: 6:30 PM EDT
- Game weather: Temperature: 86 °F (30 °C) • Wind: NNE 6 mph • Weather: Partly Cloudy
- Game attendance: 23,875
- Referee: Kevin Randall
- TV announcers (Stadium): Chris Hassell (play-by-play) & A. J. Hawk (analyst)
- ESPN – Green helps lead Marshall to 56–17 victory over VMI /// Box Score, VMI at Marshall /// Pregame Notes /// Postgame Notes

Game information

First Quarter

- (03:09) MAR TD – Willie Johnson 29-yard pass from Isaiah Green, Justin Rohrwasser kick
  Drive: 6 plays, 60 yards, 2:40; Marshall 7–0
- (01:42) MAR TD – Talik Keaton 67-yard punt return, Justin Rohrwasser kick
  Drive: 0 plays, 0 yards, 0:00; Marshall 14–0

Second Quarter

- (13:24) MAR TD – Artie Henry 51-yard pass from Isaiah Green, Justin Rohrwasser kick
  Drive: 7 plays, 89 yards, 2:14; Marshall 21–0
- (13:10) VMI TD – Javeon Lara 50-yard pass from Reece Udinski, Grant Clemons kick
  Drive: 1 play, 65 yards, 0:14; Marshall 21–7
- (04:14) MAR TD – Xavier Gaines 4-yard pass from Isaiah Green, Justin Rohrwasser kick
  Drive: 6 plays, 87 yards, 2:42; Marshall 28–7
- (00:00) MAR TD – Brenden Knox 1-yard rush, Justin Rohrwasser kick
  Drive: 14 plays, 83 yards, 2:27; Marshall 35–7

Third Quarter

- (09:58) MAR TD – Corey Gammage33-yard pass from Isaiah Green, Justin Rohrwasser kick
  Drive: 11 plays, 82 yards, 5:02; Marshall 42–7
- (04:25) MAR TD – Brenden Knox 1-yard rush, Justin Rohrwasser kick
  Drive: 7 plays, 99 yards, 3:26; Marshall 49–7

Fourth Quarter

- (14:37) VMI FG – Grant Clemons 28-yard field goal
  Drive: 19 plays, 64 yards, 4:48; Marshall 49–10
- (08:48) VMI TD – Seth Morgan 3-yard rush, Grant Clemons kick
  Drive: 8 plays, 45 yards, 3:08; Marshall 49–17
- (04:31) MAR TD – Garet Morrell 11-yard pass from Alex Thomson, Justin Rohrwasser kick
  Drive: 8 plays, 73 yards, 4:17; Marshall 56–17

Passing

- VMI – Reece Udinski: 20/35, 192 yards, 1 TD
- MAR – Isaiah Green: 18/28, 238 yards, 4 TD, 1 INT

Rushing

- VMI – Alex Ramsey: 11 carries, 45 yards
- MAR – Tyler King: 10 carries, 75 yards

Receiving

- VMI – Javeon Lara: 5 receptions, 72 yards, 1 TD
- MAR – Corey Gammage: 5 receptions, 82 yards, 1 TD

=== Mars Hill ===
Mars Hill Mountain Lions at VMI Keydets

Quarter	1	2	3	4	Total
Mountain Lions	0	14	0	7	21
Keydets	21	7	22	13	63

at Alumni Memorial Field, Lexington, VA

- Date: September 7, 2019
- Game time: 1:30 PM EDT
- Game attendance: 3,483
- Referee: Bruce Austin
- TV announcers (ESPN3): Pete Yannity (play-by-play) & Jared Singleton (analyst)
- ESPN – Udinski throws 4 TD passes, VMI routs Mars Hill, 63–21 /// Box Score, Mars Hill at VMI /// Pregame Notes /// Postgame Notes

Game information

First Quarter

- (12:12) VMI TD – Javeon Lara 26-yard pass from Reece Udinski, Grant Clemons kick
  Drive: 4 plays, 51 yards, 1:10; VMI 7–0
- (06:35) VMI TD – Alex Ramsey 8-yard rush, Grant Clemons kick
  Drive: 4 plays, 20 yards, 1:19; VMI 14–0
- (03:32) VMI TD – Leroy Thomas 7-yard pass from Reece Udinski, Grant Clemons kick
  Drive: 6 plays, 28 yards, 1:29; VMI 21–0

Second Quarter

- (13:55) MHU TD – Javon Harbison 5-yard pass from Jimmy Urzua, Tanner Fox kick
  Drive: 7 plays, 33 yards, 2:38; VMI 21–7
- (10:31) MHU TD – Craig Rucker 8-yard pass from Jimmy Urzua, Tanner Fox kick
  Drive: 7 plays, 72 yards, 2:13; VMI 21–14
- (08:01) VMI TD – Jakob Herres 36-yard pass from Reece Udinski, Grant Clemons kick
  Drive: 7 plays, 76 yards, 2:30; VMI 28–14

Third Quarter

- (13:56) VMI TD – Alex Ramsey 6-yard rush, Grant Clemons kick
  Drive: 4 plays, 65 yards, 1:04; VMI 35–14
- (10:35) VMI TD – Javeon Lara 12-yard pass from Reece Udinski, Alex Ramsey rush
  Drive: 4 plays, 47 yards, 0:55; VMI 43–14
- (00:53) VMI TD – Max Brimigion 32-yard pass from Chance Newman, Grant Clemons kick
  Drive: 6 plays, 53 yards, 2:06; VMI 50–14

Fourth Quarter

- (03:43) VMI TD – Seth Morgan 6-yard rush, Camden Murphy kick failed
  Drive: 4 plays, 29 yards, 1:21; VMI 56–14
- (03:32) MHU TD – Javon Harbison 65-yard pass from Cody Boynton, Tanner Fox kick
  Drive: 1 play, 65 yards, 0:11; VMI 56–21
- (03:19) VMI TD – Chima Kpaduwa 75-yard rush, Camden Murphy kick
  Drive: 1 play, 75 yards, 0:13; VMI 63–21

Passing

- MHU – Jimmy Urzua: 13/25, 156 yards, 2 TD, 2 INT
- VMI – Reece Udinski: 17/29, 264 yards, 4 TD

Rushing

- MHU – Rolous Frazier: 10 carries, 48 yards
- VMI – Alex Ramsey: 15 carries, 88 yards, 2 TD

Receiving

- MHU – Javon Harbison: 7 receptions, 131 yards, 2 TD
- VMI – Alex Ramsey: 3 receptions, 95 yards

=== At East Tennessee State ===
VMI Keydets at East Tennessee State Buccaneers

Quarter	1	2	3	4	OT	Total
Keydets	0	7	7	10	7	31
Buccaneers	0	7	3	14	0	24

at William B. Greene Jr. Stadium, Johnson City, TN

- Date: September 14, 2019
- Game time: 7:30 PM EDT
- Game weather: Temperature: 87 °F (31 °C) • Wind: SSW 4 mph • Weather: Cloudy, humid
- Game attendance: 9,150
- Referee: Larry Adcock
- TV announcers (ESPN+): David Jackson (play-by-play) & Mark Hutsell (analyst)
- ESPN – VMI at East Tennessee State /// Box Score, VMI at East Tennessee State /// Pregame Notes /// Postgame Notes

Game information

First Quarter
No scoring
Second Quarter

- (05:34) ETSU TD – Keith Coffee 57-yard pass from Trey Mitchell, Tyler Keltner kick
  Drive: 2 plays, 71 yards, 0:47; East Tennessee State 7–0
- (01:41) VMI TD – Rohan Martin 13-yard pass from Reece Udinski, Grant Clemons kick
  Drive: 11 plays, 65 yards, 3:53; Tied 7–7

Third Quarter

- (11:32) VMI TD – Alex Ramsey 3-yard rush, Grant Clemons kick
  Drive: 4 plays, 59 yards, 1:49; VMI 14–7
- (06:14) ETSU FG – Tyler Keltner 37-yard field goal
  Drive: 12 plays, 51 yards, 5:09; VMI 14–10

Fourth Quarter

- (10:29) ETSU TD – Anthony Spagnoletti 20-yard pass from Trey Mitchell, Tyler Keltner kick
  Drive: 6 plays, 90 yards, 2:53; East Tennessee State 17–14
- (06:47) VMI TD – Alex Ramsey 1-yard rush, Grant Clemons kick
  Drive: 11 plays, 75 yards, 3:42; VMI 21–17
- (05:59) ETSU TD – Jacob Saylors 61-yard rush, Tyler Keltner kick
  Drive: 3 plays, 75 yards, 0:48; East Tennessee State 24–21
- (00:10) VMI FG – Grant Clemons 30-yard field goal
  Drive: 11 plays, 64 yards, 2:17; Tied 24–24

Overtime

- VMI TD – Javeon Lara 21-yard pass from Reece Udinski, Grant Clemons kick
  Drive: 3 plays, 25 yards, 00:00; VMI 31–24

Passing

- VMI – Reece Udinski: 38/64, 281 yards, 2 TD
- ETSU – Trey Mitchell: 17/38, 250 yards, 2 TD, 1 INT

Rushing

- VMI – Alex Ramsey: 16 carries, 57 yards, 2 TD
- ETSU – Jacob Saylors: 9 carries, 112 yards, 1 TD

Receiving

- VMI – Jakob Harris: 8 receptions, 79 yards
- ETSU – Keith Coffee: 2 receptions, 72 yards, 1 TD

=== Robert Morris ===
Robert Morris Colonials at VMI Keydets

Quarter	1	2	3	4	Total
Colonials	14	7	7	3	31
Keydets	3	5	6	7	21

at Alumni Memorial Field, Lexington, VA

- Date: September 21, 2019
- Game time: 1:30 PM EDT
- Game attendance: 3,900
- Referee: Scott Broadway
- TV announcers (ESPN+): Wade Branner (play-by-play) & Cal Murray (analyst)
- ESPN – Robert Morris earns its first win, holds off VMI 31–21 /// Box Score, Robert Morris at VMI /// Pregame Notes /// Postgame Notes

Game information

First Quarter

- (10:34) RMU TD – Alijah Jackson 47-yard rush, Nick Bisceglia kick
  Drive: 2 plays, 52 yards, 0:47; Robert Morris 7–0
- (04:29) VMI FG – Grant Clemons 36-yard field goal
  Drive: 15 plays, 56 yards, 6:05; Robert Morris 7–3
- (02:51) RMU TD – Garrett Houser 15-yard pass from Caleb Lewis, Nick Bisceglia kick
  Drive: 3 plays, 23 yards, 1:21; Robert Morris 14–3

Second Quarter

- (12:07) VMI FG – Grant Clemons 29-yard field goal
  Drive: 13 plays, 64 yards, 5:44; Robert Morris 14–6
- (10:26) VMI SF – Aljareek Malry safety
  Drive: 0 plays, 0 yards, 0:00; Robert Morris 14–8
- (01:26) RMU TD – Teren Stephens 6-yard rush, Nick Bisceglia kick
  Drive: 10 plays, 66 yards, 5:13; Robert Morris 21–8

Third Quarter

- (10:33) VMI TD – Jakob Herres 21-yard pass from Reece Udinski, Reed King rush failed
  Drive: 8 plays, 55 yards, 2:34; Robert Morris 21–14
- (06:44) RMU TD – Teren Stephens 2-yard rush, Nick Bisceglia kick
  Drive: 8 plays, 75 yards, 3:49; Robert Morris 28–14

Fourth Quarter

- (14:53) VMI TD – Alex Ramsey 2-yard rush, Grant Clemons kick
  Drive: 7 plays, 80 yards, 1:55; Robert Morris 28–21
- (09:11) RMU FG – Nick Bisceglia 25-yard field goal
  Drive: 10 plays, 67 yards, 5:42; Robert Morris 31–21

Passing

- RMU – Caleb Lewis: 12/17, 214 yards, 1 TD, 1 INT
- VMI – Reece Udinski: 30/51, 274 yards, 1 TD

Rushing

- RMU – Alijah Jackson: 20 carries, 125 yards, 1 TD
- VMI – Alex Ramsey: 24 carries, 153 yards, 1 TD

Receiving

- RMU – Matthew Gonzalez: 3 receptions, 126 yards
- VMI – Leroy Thomas: 7 receptions, 97 yards

=== Wofford ===
Wofford Terriers at VMI Keydets

Quarter	1	2	3	4	Total
Terriers	21	14	6	10	51
Keydets	10	14	0	12	36

at Alumni Memorial Field, Lexington, VA

- Date: September 28, 2019
- Game time: 1:30 PM EDT
- Game attendance: 3,300
- Referee: Thomas Graham
- TV announcers (ESPN+): Wade Branner (Play-by-play) & Chip Tarkenton (color)
- ESPN – Newman, Morgan carry Wofford past VMI in SoCon battle, 51–36 /// Box Score, Wofford at VMI /// Pregame Notes /// Postgame Notes

Game information

First Quarter

- (12:11) VMI TD – Alex Ramsey 1-yard rush, Grant Clemons kick
  Drive: 8 plays, 68 yards, 2:49; VMI 7–0
- (09:33) WOF TD – Ryan Lovelace 37-yard rush, Luke Carter kick
  Drive: 6 plays, 75 yards, 2:38; Tied 7–7
- (06:36) VMI FG – Grant Clemons 37-yard field goal
  Drive: 8 plays, 35 yards, 2:57; VMI 10–7
- (04:21) WOF TD – D'mauriae VanCleave 41-yard pass from Joe Newman, Luke Carter kick
  Drive: 4 plays, 65 yards, 2:15; Wofford 14–10
- (00:11) WOF TD – Joe Newman 6-yard rush, Luke Carter kick
  Drive: 4 plays, 39 yards, 1:34; Wofford 21–10

Second Quarter

- (09:53) WOF TD – Blake Morgan 3-yard rush, Luke Carter kick
  Drive: 9 plays, 60 yards, 4:42; Wofford 28–10
- (07:32) WOF TD – TJ Luther 71-yard pass from Joe Newman, Luke Carter kick
  Drive: 2 plays, 80 yards, 0:53; Wofford 35–10
- (03:41) VMI TD – Alex Ramsey 1-yard rush, Grant Clemons kick
  Drive: 10 plays, 41 yards, 3:51; Wofford 35–17
- (00:10) VMI TD – Alex Ramsey 2-yard rush, Grant Clemons kick
  Drive: 9 plays, 89 yards, 1:20; Wofford 35–24

Third Quarter

- (09:46) WOF FG – Luke Carter 23-yard field goal
  Drive: 10 plays, 71 yards, 5:14; Wofford 38–24
- (00:44) WOF FG – Luke Carter 39-yard field goal
  Drive: 11 plays, 55 yards, 5:12; Wofford 41–24

Fourth Quarter

- (03:35) WOF TD – Blake Morgan 3-yard rush, Luke Carter kick
  Drive: 13 plays, 75 yards, 6:44; Wofford 48–24
- (01:54) VMI TD – Leroy Thomas 4-yard pass from Reece Udinski, Reece Udinski pass failed
  Drive: 7 plays, 75 yards, 1:41; Wofford 48–30
- (01:14) WOF FG – Luke Carter 30-yard field goal
  Drive: 5 plays, 33 yards, 0:40; Wofford 51–30
- (00:08) VMI TD – Colby Rider 1-yard pass from Reece Udinski, Alex Ramsey rush failed
  Drive: 6 plays, 72 yards, 1:06; Wofford 51–36

Passing

- WOF – Joe Newman: 5/8, 142 yards, 2 TD
- VMI – Reece Udinski: 25/38, 315 yards, 2 TD

Rushing

- WOF – Joe Newman: 10 carries, 97 yards, 1 TD
- VMI – Alex Ramsey: 28 carries, 207 yards, 3 TD

Receiving

- WOF – TJ Luther: 2 receptions, 82 yards, 1 TD
- VMI – Leroy Thomas: 10 receptions, 123 yards, 1 TD

=== At The Citadel ===
VMI Keydets at The Citadel Bulldogs

Quarter	1	2	3	4	Total
Keydets	7	10	7	10	34
Bulldogs	7	0	7	7	21

at Johnson Hagood Stadium, Charleston, SC

- Date: October 5, 2019
- Game time: 2:00 PM EDT
- Game weather: Temperature: Low 80's • Wind: Calm ENE • Weather: Overcast, Showers
- Game attendance: 12,126
- Referee: Jeff Page
- TV announcers (ESPN+): Pete Yannity (play-by-play) & Jared Singleton (analyst)
- ESPN – VMI snaps 12-game losing streak vs. The Citadel, wins 34–21 /// Box Score, VMI at The Citadel (75th Military Classic of the South) /// Pregame Notes /// Postgame Notes

Game information

First Quarter

- (10:40) CIT TD – Brandon Rainey 2-yard rush, Jacob Godek kick
  Drive: 8 plays, 75 yards, 4:20; The Citadel 7–0
- (01:07) VMI TD – Jakob Herres 9-yard pass from Reece Udinski, Grant Clemons kick
  Drive: 9 plays, 54 yards, 3:04; Tied 7–7

Second Quarter

- (05:37) VMI TD – Alex Ramsey 1-yard rush, Grant Clemons kick
  Drive: 10 plays, 73 yards, 2:57; VMI 14–7
- (00:00) VMI FG – Grant Clemons 22-yard field goal
  Drive: 7 plays, 75 yards, 1:20; VMI 17–7

Third Quarter

- (11:50) VMI TD – Javeon Lara 28-yard pass from Reece Udinski, Grant Clemons kick
  Drive: 7 plays, 75 yards, 3:10; VMI 24–7
- (05:53) CIT TD – Brandon Rainey 3-yard rush, Jacob Godek kick
  Drive: 12 plays, 75 yards, 5:57; VMI 24–14

Fourth Quarter

- (12:30) VMI FG – Grant Clemons 46-yard field goal
  Drive: 11 plays, 71 yards, 4:03; VMI 27–14
- (03:22) CIT TD – Brandon Rainey 3-yard rush, Jacob Godek kick
  Drive: 8 plays, 75 yards, 2:35; VMI 27–21
- (02:18) VMI TD – Jakob Herres 61-yard pass from Reece Udinski, Grant Clemons kick
  Drive: 3 plays, 66 yards, 1:01; VMI 34–21

Passing

- VMI – Reece Udinski: 25/35, 335 yards, 3 TD
- CIT – Brandon Rainey: 19/34, 233 yards

Rushing

- VMI – Alex Ramsey: 27 carries, 97 yards, 1 TD
- CIT – Logan Billings: 13 carries, 51 yards

Receiving

- VMI – Jakob Herres: 8 receptions, 175 yards, 2 TD
- CIT – Raleigh Webb: 10 receptions, 110 yards

=== Samford ===
Samford Bulldogs at VMI Keydets

Quarter	1	2	3	4	OT	Total
Bulldogs	14	10	14	3	0	41
Keydets	14	14	0	13	7	48

at Alumni Memorial Field, Lexington, VA

- Date: October 12, 2019
- Game time: 1:30 PM EDT
- Game attendance: 5,300
- Referee: Bruce Austin
- TV announcers (ESPN+): Pete Yannity (play-by-play) & Jared Singleton (analyst)
- ESPN – Record-setting Ramsey scores 6 TD's; VMI downs Samford in OT /// Box Score, Samford at VMI /// Pregame Notes /// Postgame Notes

Game information

First Quarter

- (08:21) VMI TD – Alex Ramsey 1-yard rush, Grant Clemons kick
  Drive: 11 plays, 84 yards, 3:39; VMI 7–0
- (05:35) SAM TD – Montrell Washington 10-yard rush, Mitchell Fineran kick
  Drive: 8 plays, 75 yards, 2:46; Tied 7–7
- (02:57) VMI TD – Alex Ramsey 2-yard rush, Grant Clemons kick
  Drive: 7 plays, 75 yards, 2:38; VMI 14–7
- (00:06) SAM TD – Montrell Washington 15-yard pass from Chris Oladokun, Mitchell Fineran kick
  Drive: 10 plays, 82 yards, 2:51; Tied 14–14

Second Quarter

- (09:35) VMI TD – Alex Ramsey 1-yard rush, Grant Clemons kick
  Drive: 15 plays, 77 yards, 5:31; VMI 21–14
- (08:02) SAM TD – Torrence Pollard 0-yard fumble return, Mitchell Fineran kick
  Drive: 0 plays, 0 yards, 0:00; Tied 21–21
- (03:00) VMI TD – Alex Ramsey 5-yard rush, Grant Clemons kick
  Drive: 12 plays, 75 yards, 5:02; VMI 28–21
- (00:11) SAM FG – Mitchell Fineran 23-yard field goal
  Drive: 12 plays, 76 yards, 2:49; VMI 28–24

Third Quarter

- (09:15) SAM TD – Jay Stanton 19-yard pass from Chris Oladokun, Mitchell Fineran kick
  Drive: 13 plays, 86 yards, 5:45; Samford 31–28
- (01:39) SAM TD – Chris Shelling 13-yard pass from Chris Oladokun, Mitchell Fineran kick
  Drive: 12 plays, 69 yards, 3:19; Samford 38–28

Fourth Quarter

- (13:03) VMI FG – Grant Clemons 33-yard field goal
  Drive: 10 plays, 59 yards, 3:36; Samford 38–31
- (04:16) VMI TD – Alex Ramsey 1-yard rush, Grant Clemons kick
  Drive: 9 plays, 50 yards, 2:32; Tied 38–38
- (00:41) SAM FG – Mitchell Fineran 45-yard field goal
  Drive: 10 plays, 47 yards, 3:35; Samford 41–38
- (00:00) VMI FG – Grant Clemons 56-yard field goal
  Drive: 5 plays, 26 yards, 0:41; Tied 41–41

Overtime

- VMI TD – Alex Ramsey 25-yard rush, Grant Clemons kick
  Drive: 1 play, 25 yards, 0:00; VMI 48–41

Passing

- SAM – Chris Oladokun: 31/46, 294 yards, 3 TD
- VMI – Reece Udinski: 37/46, 390 yards

Rushing

- SAM – Chris Oladokun: 16 carries, 84 yards
- VMI – Alex Ramsey: 37 carries, 163 yards, 6 TD

Receiving

- SAM – Montrell Washington: 8 receptions, 96 yards, 1 TD
- VMI – Jakob Herres: 10 receptions, 172 yards

=== At Mercer ===
VMI Keydets at Mercer Bears

Quarter	1	2	3	4	Total
Keydets	3	3	0	21	27
Bears	3	10	14	7	34

at Five Star Stadium, Macon, GA

- Date: October 19, 2019
- Game time: 3:00 PM EDT
- Game weather: Temperature: 60 °F (16 °C) • Wind: N 11 mph • Weather: Rainy
- Game attendance: 5,714
- Referee: Bob Johnson
- TV announcers (ESPN+): Frank Malloy (play-by-play), Jason Patterson (analyst) & Kristin Banks (sideline)
- ESPN – Devezin runs for 193 yards, leads Mercer over VMI 34–27 /// Box Score, VMI at Mercer /// Pregame Notes /// Postgame Notes

Game information

First Quarter

- (10:33) MER FG – Caleb Dowden 40-yard field goal
  Drive: 8 plays, 43 yards, 2:28; Mercer 3–0
- (08:32) VMI FG – Grant Clemons 37-yard field goal
  Drive: 7 plays, 60 yards, 1:54; Tied 3–3

Second Quarter

- (13:20) VMI FG – Grant Clemons 20-yard field goal
  Drive: 13 plays, 92 yards, 2:42; VMI 6–3
- (09:37) MER TD – Steven Peterson 5-yard pass from Robert Riddle, Caleb Dowden kick
  Drive: 9 plays, 75 yards, 3:43; Mercer 10–6
- (05:21) MER FG – Caleb Dowden 39-yard field goal
  Drive: 7 plays, 30 yards, 2:53; Mercer 13–6

Third Quarter

- (09:28) MER TD – Chris Ellington 9-yard pass from Harrison Frost, Caleb Dowden kick
  Drive: 13 plays, 75 yards, 5:32; Mercer 20–6
- (04:10) MER TD – Yahsyn McKee 12-yard pass from Kaelan Riley, Caleb Dowden kick
  Drive: 9 plays, 71 yards, 4:38; Mercer 27–6

Fourth Quarter

- (14:56) VMI TD – Alex Ramsey 1-yard rush, Grant Clemons kick
  Drive: 11 plays, 53 yards, 4:14; Mercer 27–13
- (10:08) VMI TD – Colby Rider 2-yard pass from Reece Udinski, Grant Clemons kick
  Drive: 9 plays, 70 yards, 2:59; Mercer 27–20
- (03:01) MER TD – Tyray Devezin 56-yard rush, Caleb Dowden kick
  Drive: 3 plays, 64 yards, 1:00; Mercer 34–20
- (00:56) VMI TD – Alex Ramsey 1-yard rush, Grant Clemons kick
  Drive: 11 plays, 69 yards, 2:05; Mercer 34–27

Passing

- VMI – Reece Udinski: 26/46, 263 yards, 1 TD
- MER – Robert Riddle: 12/18, 132 yards, 1 TD, 1 INT

Rushing

- VMI – Alex Ramsey: 27 carries, 125 yards, 2 TD
- MER – Tyray Devezin: 25 carries, 193 yards, 1 TD

Receiving

- VMI – Leroy Thomas: 7 receptions, 70 yards
- MER – Chris Ellington: 6 receptions, 74 yards, 1 TD

=== Western Carolina ===
Western Carolina Catamounts at VMI Keydets

Quarter	1	2	3	4	Total
Catamounts	14	6	7	16	43
Keydets	13	6	3	13	35

at Alumni Memorial Field, Lexington, VA

- Date: November 2, 2019
- Game time: 1:30 PM EDT
- Game attendance: 4,568
- Referee: Scott Broadway
- TV announcers (ESPN+): Wade Branner (play-by-play) & Chip Tarkenton (analyst)
- ESPN – Adams, Spencer lead Western Carolina victory /// Box Score, Western Carolina at VMI /// Pregame Notes /// Postgame Notes

Game information

First Quarter

- (12:02) VMI TD – Alex Ramsey 1-yard rush, Grant Clemons kick
  Drive: 9 plays, 60 yards, 2:58; VMI 7–0
- (11:45) WCU TD – Donnavan Spencer 78-yard pass from Tyrie Adams, Julian Pletz kick
  Drive: 1 play, 78 yards, 0:17; Tied 7–7
- (05:42) WCU TD – D.J. Thorpe 13-yard pass from Tyrie Adams, Julian Pletz kick
  Drive: 8 plays, 38 yards, 4:41; Western Carolina 14–7
- (03:59) VMI TD – Alex Ramsey 11-yard rush, Grant Clemons kick failed
  Drive: 5 plays, 46 yards, 1:43; Western Carolina 14–13

Second Quarter

- (14:50) WCU FG – Julian Pletz 44-yard field goal
  Drive: 10 plays, 48 yards, 4:09; Western Carolina 17–13
- (11:11) VMI TD – Alex Ramsey 3-yard rush, Reed King rush failed
  Drive: 9 plays, 63 yards, 3:39; VMI 19–17
- (05:22) WCU FG – Julian Pletz 41-yard field goal
  Drive: 11 plays, 55 yards, 5:49; Western Carolina 20–19

Third Quarter

- (10:22) WCU TD – Donnavan Spencer 1-yard rush, Julian Pletz kick
  Drive: 9 plays, 75 yards, 4:38; Western Carolina 27–19
- (03:20) VMI FG – Grant Clemons 30-yard field goal
  Drive: 16 plays, 57 yards, 7:02; Western Carolina 27–22

Fourth Quarter

- (14:15) WCU FG – Julian Pletz 26-yard field goal
  Drive: 5 plays, 32 yards, 2:25; Western Carolina 30–22
- (08:06) WCU TD – Donnavan Spencer 42-yard rush, Julian Pletz kick
  Drive: 6 plays, 91 yards, 3:31; Western Carolina 37–22
- (06:39) VMI TD – Jakob Herres 10-yard pass from Reece Udinski, Grant Clemons kick
  Drive: 6 plays, 70 yards, 1:27; Western Carolina 37–29
- (03:10) VMI TD – Leroy Thomas 62-yard pass from Reece Udinski, Reece Udinski pass failed
  Drive: 2 plays, 62 yards, 0:18; Western Carolina 37–35
- (00:00) WCU TD – Daquan Patten 42-yard pass from Tyrie Adams
  Drive: 7 plays, 62 yards, 3:10; Western Carolina 43–35

Passing

- WCU – Tyrie Adams: 14/22, 322 yards, 3 TD
- VMI – Reece Udinski: 23/31, 317 yards, 2 TD, 1 INT

Rushing

- WCU – Donnavan Spencer: 28 carries, 137 yards, 2 TD
- VMI – Alex Ramsey: 29 carries, 143 yards, 3 TD

Receiving

- WCU – Donnavan Spencer: 2 receptions, 110 yards, 1 TD
- VMI – Jakob Herres: 7 receptions, 105 yards, 1 TD

=== At Furman ===
VMI Keydets at No. 9 Furman Paladins

Quarter	1	2	3	4	Total
Keydets	7	14	0	0	21
No. 9 Paladins	15	17	14	14	60

at Paladin Stadium, Greenville, SC

- Date: November 9, 2019
- Game time: 1:00 PM EDT
- Game weather: Temperature: 48 °F (9 °C) • Wind: W 2 mph • Weather: Sunny
- Game attendance: 7,229
- Referee: Bruce Austin
- TV announcers (ESPN+): Bob Mihalic (play-by-play) & Sam Wyche (analyst)
- ESPN – Wynn scores 5 times to lead Furman past VMI 60–21 /// Box Score, VMI at No. 9 Furman /// Pregame Notes /// Postgame Notes

Game information

First Quarter

- (10:06) FUR TD – Devin Wynn 1-yard rush, Grayson Atkins kick
  Drive: 7 plays, 52 yards, 3:11; Furman 7–0
- (04:05) FUR TD – Devin Wynn 1-yard rush, Jack Hardin rush
  Drive: 7 plays, 80 yards, 3:23; Furman 15–0
- (01:50) VMI TD – Jakob Herres 45-yard pass from Reece Udinski, Grant Clemons kick
  Drive: 6 plays, 70 yards, 2:07; Furman 15–7

Second Quarter

- (12:43) VMI TD – Alex Ramsey 49-yard rush, Grant Clemons kick
  Drive: 5 plays, 78 yards, 1:53; Furman 15–14
- (08:39) FUR TD – Devin Wynn 4-yard rush, Grayson Atkins kick
  Drive: 9 plays, 75 yards, 4:04; Furman 22–14
- (03:36) VMI TD – Alex Ramsey 1-yard rush, Grant Clemons kick
  Drive: 13 plays, 76 yards, 4:56; Furman 22–21
- (01:06) FUR TD – Devin Wynn 2-yard pass from Hamp Sisson, Grayson Atkins kick
  Drive: 7 plays, 75 yards, 2:30; Furman 29–21
- (00:00) FUR FG – Grayson Atkins 48-yard field goal
  Drive: 5 plays, 21 yards, 0:30; Furman 32–21

Third Quarter

- (09:07) FUR TD – Dominic Roberto 1-yard rush, Grayson Atkins kick
  Drive: 12 plays, 80 yards, 5:48; Furman 39–21
- (06:57) FUR TD – Devin Abrams 71-yard pass from Hamp Sisson, Grayson Atkins kick
  Drive: 2 plays, 72 yards, 0:55; Furman 46–21

Fourth Quarter

- (14:07) FUR TD – Devin Wynn 59-yard rush, Grayson Atkins kick
  Drive: 2 plays, 65 yards, 0:53; Furman 53–21
- (04:20) FUR TD – Jeff McElveen 1-yard rush, Timmy Bleekrode kick
  Drive: 6 plays, 38 yards, 3:25; Furman 60–21

Passing

- VMI – Reece Udinski: 23/34, 213 yards, 1 TD, 2 INT
- FUR – Hamp Sisson: 17/22, 277 yards, 2 TD

Rushing

- VMI – Alex Ramsey: 20 carries, 132 yards, 2 TD
- FUR – Devin Wynn: 15 carries, 102 yards, 4 TD

Receiving

- VMI – Jakob Herres: 8 receptions, 102 yards, 1 TD
- FUR – Thomas Gordon: 10 receptions, 148 yards

=== At Army ===
VMI Keydets at Army Black Knights

Quarter	1	2	3	4	Total
Keydets	3	3	0	0	6
Black Knights	7	7	19	14	47

at Michie Stadium, West Point, NY

- Date: November 16, 2019
- Game time: 12:00 PM EST
- Game attendance: 25,747
- Referee: Riley Johnson
- TV announcers (CBSSN): Ben Holden (play-by-play), Ross Tucker (analyst) & Tina Cervasio (sideline)
- ESPN – Army closes home slate with 47–6 win over VMI /// Box Score, VMI at Army /// Pregame Notes /// Postgame Notes

Game information

First Quarter

- (11:44) VMI FG – Grant Clemons 47-yard field goal
  Drive: 8 plays, 22 yards, 3:16; VMI 3–0
- (07:17) ARMY TD – Jabari Laws 4-yard rush, Cole Talley kick
  Drive: 9 plays, 75 yards, 4:27; Army 7–3

Second Quarter

- (06:34) VMI FG – Grant Clemons 37-yard field goal
  Drive: 16 plays, 60 yards, 5:57; Army 7–6
- (03:08) ARMY TD – Connor Slomka 3-yard rush, David Cooper kick
  Drive: 7 plays, 64 yards, 3:17; Army 14–6

Third Quarter

- (07:46) ARMY TD – Kell Walker 59-yard rush, David Cooper kick
  Drive: 10 plays, 99 yards, 5:21; Army 21–6
- (05:07) ARMY TD – Connor Slomka 3-yard rush, David Cooper kick failed
  Drive: 3 plays, 27 yards, 1:24; Army 27–6
- (01:30) ARMY TD – Kelvin Hopkins Jr. 63-yard rush, Zach Potter kick failed
  Drive: 2 plays, 65 yards, 1:07; Army 33–6

Fourth Quarter

- (14:23) ARMY TD – Connor Slomka 8-yard rush, David Cooper kick
  Drive: 4 plays, 39 yards, 1:54; Army 40–6
- (05:17) ARMY TD – Christian Anderson 4-yard rush, David Cooper kick
  Drive: 12 plays, 90 yards, 7:20; Army 47–6

Passing

- VMI – Reece Udinski: 22/34, 218 yards
- ARMY – Kelvin Hopkins Jr.: 4/7, 49 yards, 1 INT

Rushing

- VMI – Alex Ramsey: 14 carries, 50 yards
- ARMY – Kelvin Hopkins Jr.: 16 carries, 208 yards, 1 TD

Receiving

- VMI – Jakob Herres: 7 receptions, 83 yards
- ARMY – Cam Harrison: 3 receptions, 48 yards

=== Chattanooga ===
Chattanooga Mocs at VMI Keydets

Quarter	1	2	3	4	Total
Mocs	10	0	7	7	24
Keydets	3	14	14	0	31

at Alumni Memorial Field, Lexington, VA

- Date: November 23, 2019
- Game time: 1:00 PM EST
- Game attendance: 3,576
- Referee: Larry Adcock
- TV announcers (ESPN3): Pete Yannity (play-by-play) & Jared Singleton (analyst)
- ESPN – Big plays help VMI top Chattanooga 31–24 /// Box Score, Chattanooga at VMI /// Pregame Notes /// Postgame Notes

Game information

First Quarter

- (10:05) UTC FG – Victor Ulmo 37-yard field goal
  Drive: 12 plays, 55 yards, 4:55; Chattanooga 3–0
- (08:21) VMI FG – Grant Clemons 29-yard field goal
  Drive: 5 plays, 30 yards, 1:44; Tied 3–3
- (03:23) UTC TD – Chris James 15-yard pass from Nick Tiano, Victor Ulmo kick
  Drive: 11 plays, 65 yards, 4:58; Chattanooga 10–3

Second Quarter

- (11:33) VMI TD – Jakob Herres 13-yard pass from Reece Udinski, Grant Clemons kick
  Drive: 7 plays, 88 yards, 2:50; Tied 10–10
- (10:07) VMI TD – Carter Johnson 2-yard blocked punt return, Grant Clemons kick
  Drive: 0 plays, 0 yards, 0:00; VMI 17–10

Third Quarter

- (14:13) VMI TD – Jakob Herres 54-yard pass from Reece Udinski, Grant Clemons kick
  Drive: 2 plays, 49 yards, 0:47; VMI 24–10
- (09:22) VMI TD – Jarrod Richmond 64-yard fumble return, Grant Clemons kick
  Drive: 0 plays, 0 yards, 0:00; VMI 31–10
- (02:42) UTC TD – Chris James 9-yard pass from Nick Tiano, Victor Ulmo kick
  Drive: 7 plays, 74 yards, 2:35; VMI 31–17

Fourth Quarter

- (04:43) UTC TD – Nick Tiano 8-yard rush, Victor Ulmo kick
  Drive: 12 plays, 89 yards, 4:22; VMI 31–24

Passing

- UTC – Nick Tiano: 19/39, 230 yards, 2 TD
- VMI – Reece Udinski: 20/36, 214 yards, 2 TD, 2 INT

Rushing

- UTC – Elijah Ibitokun-Hanks: 28 carries, 132 yards
- VMI – Alex Ramsey: 18 carries, 66 yards

Receiving

- UTC – Bryce Nunnelly: 6 receptions, 94 yards
- VMI – Jakob Herres: 8 receptions, 153 yards, 2 TD
