= 2019 Chattanooga Mocs football team =

American college football season

2019 Chattanooga Mocs football
- Conference: Southern Conference
- Record: 6–6 (5–3 SoCon)
- Head coach: Rusty Wright (1st season)
- Offensive coordinator: Joe Pizzo (1st season)
- Defensive coordinator: Lorenzo Ward (1st season)
- Home stadium: Finley Stadium

2019 Southern Conference football standings
	Conf.			Overall
Team	W		L	W		L
No. 16 Wofford $^	7	–	1	8	–	3
No. 21 Furman ^	6	–	2	8	–	4
Chattanooga	5	–	3	6	–	6
The Citadel	4	–	4	6	–	6
Samford	4	–	4	5	–	7
VMI	4	–	4	5	–	7
Mercer	3	–	5	4	–	8
Western Carolina	2	–	6	3	–	9
East Tennessee State	1	–	7	3	–	9
$ – Conference champion; ^ – FCS playoff participant; Rankings from STATS Poll

The 2019 Chattanooga Mocs football team represented the University of Tennessee at Chattanooga in the 2019 NCAA Division I FCS football season as a member of the Southern Conference (SoCon). The Mocs were led by first-year head coach Rusty Wright and played their home games at Finley Stadium in Chattanooga, Tennessee. They finished the season 6–6 overall and 5–3 in SoCon play to place third.

== Preseason ==
=== Preseason polls ===
The SoCon released their preseason media poll and coaches poll on July 22, 2019. The Mocs were picked to finish in fifth place by the media and in fourth by the coaches.

=== Preseason All-SoCon Teams ===
The Mocs placed six players on the preseason all-SoCon teams.

Offense

1st team

Bryce Nunnelly – WR

2nd team

Tyrell Price – RB

Cole Strange – OL

Defense

1st team

Marshall Cooper – LB

Brandon Dowdell – DB

Jerrell Lawson – DB

== Schedule ==
Date	Time	Opponent	Site	TV	Result	Attendance
August 29	7:00 p.m.	Eastern Illinois*	Finley Stadium; Chattanooga, TN	ESPN3	W 24–10	8,254
September 7	7:00 p.m.	at No. 18 Jacksonville State*	JSU Stadium; Jacksonville, AL	ESPN+	L 20–41	19,428
September 14	12:00 p.m.	at Tennessee*	Neyland Stadium; Knoxville, TN	SECN	L 0–45	86,208
September 21	4:00 p.m.	No. 2 James Madison*	Finley Stadium; Chattanooga, TN	ESPN+	L 14–37	8,795
September 28	4:00 p.m.	Western Carolina^{†}	Finley Stadium; Chattanooga, TN	ESPN+	W 60–36	7,636
October 5	4:00 p.m.	at Mercer	Moye Complex; Macon, GA	ESPN+	W 34–17	8,972
October 17	7:00 p.m.	East Tennessee State	Finley Stadium; Chattanooga, TN	ESPN+	W 16–13	7,124
October 26	1:30 p.m.	at Wofford	Gibbs Stadium; Spartanburg, SC	ESPN+	L 34–35 ^{OT}	4,445
November 2	2:00 p.m.	No. 13 Furman	Finley Stadium; Chattanooga, TN	ESPN+	L 20–35	7,431
November 9	2:00 p.m.	at Samford	Seibert Stadium; Homewood, AL	ESPN3	W 35–27	4,835
November 16	2:00 p.m.	The Citadel	Finley Stadium; Chattanooga, TN	ESPN+	W 34–33	7,363
November 23	1:30 p.m.	at VMI	Alumni Memorial Field; Lexington, VA	ESPN+	L 24–31	
*Non-conference game; ^{†}Homecoming; Rankings from STATS Poll released prior to the game; All times are in Eastern time

== Game summaries ==
=== Eastern Illinois ===
	1	2	3	4	Total
Panthers	3	7	0	0	10
Mocs	7	10	7	0	24

=== At Jacksonville State ===
	1	2	3	4	Total
Mocs	3	3	14	0	20
No. 18 Gamecocks	7	14	6	14	41

=== At Tennessee ===
	1	2	3	4	Total
Mocs	0	0	0	0	0
Volunteers	21	17	7	0	45

=== James Madison ===
	1	2	3	4	Total
No. 2 Dukes	14	6	10	7	37
Mocs	14	0	0	0	14

=== Western Carolina ===
	1	2	3	4	Total
Catamounts	7	14	15	0	36
Mocs	6	31	7	16	60

=== At Mercer ===
	1	2	3	4	Total
Mocs	7	10	10	7	34
Bears	14	0	0	3	17

=== East Tennessee State ===
	1	2	3	4	Total
Buccaneers	0	13	0	0	13
Mocs	7	0	6	3	16

=== At Wofford ===
	1	2	3	4	OT	Total
Mocs	7	7	0	14	6	34
Terriers	0	14	7	7	7	35

=== Furman ===
	1	2	3	4	Total
No. 13 Paladins	0	14	7	14	35
Mocs	3	9	0	8	20

=== At Samford ===
	1	2	3	4	Total
Mocs	7	21	7	0	35
Bulldogs	7	0	13	7	27

=== The Citadel ===
	1	2	3	4	Total
Bulldogs	2	7	17	7	33
Mocs	12	0	0	22	34

=== At VMI ===
	1	2	3	4	Total
Mocs	10	0	7	7	24
Keydets	3	14	14	0	31

== Ranking movements ==
Ranking movements Legend: RV = Received votes
	Week													
Poll	Pre	1	2	3	4	5	6	7	8	9	10	11	12	Final
STATS FCS	RV													
Coaches	RV													
