= 2019 Samford Bulldogs football team =

American college football season

2019 Samford Bulldogs football
- Conference: Southern Conference
- Record: 5–7 (4–4 SoCon)
- Head coach: Chris Hatcher (5th season)
- Offensive coordinator: Russ Callaway (4th season)
- Offensive scheme: Air raid
- Defensive coordinator: Bill D'Ottavio (13th season)
- Base defense: 4–3
- Home stadium: Seibert Stadium

2019 Southern Conference football standings
	Conf.			Overall
Team	W		L	W		L
No. 16 Wofford $^	7	–	1	8	–	3
No. 21 Furman ^	6	–	2	8	–	4
Chattanooga	5	–	3	6	–	6
The Citadel	4	–	4	6	–	6
Samford	4	–	4	5	–	7
VMI	4	–	4	5	–	7
Mercer	3	–	5	4	–	8
Western Carolina	2	–	6	3	–	9
East Tennessee State	1	–	7	3	–	9
$ – Conference champion; ^ – FCS playoff participant; Rankings from STATS Poll

The 2019 Samford Bulldogs football team represented Samford University in the 2019 NCAA Division I FCS football season. They were led by fifth-year head coach Chris Hatcher and played their home games at Seibert Stadium. They were a member of the Southern Conference (SoCon).

== Preseason ==
=== Preseason media poll ===
The SoCon released their preseason media poll and coaches poll on July 22, 2019. The Bulldogs were picked to finish in sixth place in both polls.

=== Preseason All-SoCon Teams ===
The Bulldogs placed four players on the preseason all-SoCon teams.

Offense

1st team

Nick Nixon – OL

Defense

2nd team

Justin Foster – DL

Nelson Jordan – DL

Specialists

1st team

Mitchell Fineran – K

== Schedule ==
Date	Time	Opponent	Site	TV	Result	Attendance
August 24	2:00 p.m.	vs. Youngstown State*	Crampton Bowl; Montgomery, AL (FCS Kickoff)	ESPN	L 22–45	12,560
August 31	6:00 p.m.	at Tennessee Tech*	Tucker Stadium; Cookeville, TN	ESPN+	L 58–59 ^{2OT}	7,806
September 14	5:00 p.m.	at No. 21 Wofford	Gibbs Stadium; Spartanburg, SC	Nexstar/ESPN3	W 21–14	3,463
September 21	6:00 p.m.	Alabama A&M*	Seibert Stadium; Homewood, AL	ESPN3	W 55–21	5,934
September 28	2:00 p.m.	No. 25 The Citadel	Seibert Stadium; Homewood, AL	ESPN+	W 61–55 ^{4OT}	3,524
October 5	2:00 p.m.	No. 14 Furman	Seibert Stadium; Homewood, AL	ESPN+	L 14–58	6,169
October 12	12:30 p.m.	at VMI	Alumni Memorial Field; Lexington, VA	Nexstar/ESPN+	L 41–48 ^{OT}	5,300
October 26	12:00 p.m.	East Tennessee State	Seibert Stadium; Homewood, AL	ESPN+	W 24–17	1,521
November 2	6:00 p.m.	at Mercer	Five Star Stadium; Macon, GA	ESPN+	L 33–36 ^{3OT}	
November 9	2:00 p.m.	Chattanooga	Seibert Stadium; Homewood, AL	ESPN3	L 27–35	4,835
November 16	1:00 p.m.	at Western Carolina	E. J. Whitmire Stadium; Cullowhee, NC	ESPN+	W 31–13	
November 23	11:00 a.m.	at No. 15 (FBS) Auburn*	Jordan–Hare Stadium; Auburn, AL	SECN	L 0–52	80,692
*Non-conference game; Rankings from STATS Poll released prior to the game; All times are in Central time

== Game summaries ==
=== Vs. Youngstown State ===
	1	2	3	4	Total
Penguins	14	10	0	21	45
Bulldogs	7	0	0	15	22

Scoring summary

Quarter	Time	Drive			Team	Scoring information	Score	
Quarter	Time	Plays	Yards	TOP	Team	Scoring information	YSU	SAM
1	9:09	5	85	1:22	SAM	Robert Adams 55-yard touchdown reception from Liam Welch, Mitchell Fineran kick good	0	7
1	2:12	13	83	6:57	YSU	Samuel St. Surin 16-yard touchdown reception from Nathan Mays, Colton McFadden kick good	7	7
1	1:29				YSU	Fumble recovery returned 25 yards for touchdown by Cash Mitchell, Colton McFadden kick good	14	7
2	10:57	8	41	3:55	YSU	43-yard field goal by Colton McFadden	17	7
2	0:36	12	90	2:46	YSU	Josh Burgett 4-yard touchdown reception from Nathan Mays, Colton McFadden kick good	24	7
4	14:29	8	63	3:45	YSU	Braxton Chapman 1-yard touchdown run, Colton McFadden kick good	31	7
4	13:37	3	70	0:52	SAM	Montrell Washington 64-yard touchdown reception from Chris Oladokun, 2-point run good	31	15
4	5:16	13	75	8:21	YSU	Braxton Champan 1-yard touchdown run, Colton McFadden kick good	38	15
4	3:17	6	36	1:59	SAM	Chris Oladokun 10-yard touchdown run, Mitchell Finehan kick good	38	22
4	2:16	3	44	1:01	YSU	Christian Turner 3-yard touchdown run, Colton McFadden kick good	45	22
"TOP" = time of possession. For other American football terms, see Glossary of American football.							45	22

=== At Tennessee Tech ===
	1	2	3	4	OT	2OT	Total
Bulldogs	7	17	14	6	7	7	58
Golden Eagles	12	0	10	22	7	8	59

=== At Wofford ===
	1	2	3	4	Total
Bulldogs	14	0	7	0	21
No. 21 Terriers	14	0	0	0	14

=== Alabama A&M ===
	1	2	3	4	Total
AAMU Bulldogs	7	7	0	7	21
SAM Bulldogs	10	21	10	14	55

=== The Citadel ===
	1	2	3	4	OT	2OT	3OT	4OT	Total
No. 25 CIT Bulldogs	7	7	7	17	7	7	3	0	55
SAM Bulldogs	7	3	14	14	7	7	3	6	61

=== Furman ===
	1	2	3	4	Total
No. 14 Paladins	28	14	10	6	58
Bulldogs	7	7	0	0	14

=== At VMI ===
	1	2	3	4	OT	Total
Bulldogs	14	10	14	3	0	41
Keydets	14	14	0	13	7	48

=== East Tennessee State ===
	1	2	3	4	Total
Buccaneers	0	14	0	3	17
Bulldogs	7	0	10	7	24

=== At Mercer ===
	1	2	3	4	OT	2OT	3OT	Total
Bulldogs	7	3	7	6	7	3	0	33
Bears	3	7	6	7	7	3	3	36

=== Chattanooga ===
	1	2	3	4	Total
Mocs	7	21	7	0	35
Bulldogs	7	0	13	7	27

=== At Western Carolina ===
	1	2	3	4	Total
Bulldogs	7	10	7	7	31
Catamounts	10	3	0	0	13

=== At Auburn ===
Samford Bulldogs at No. 15 (FBS) Auburn Tigers – Game summary

Quarter	1	2	3	4	Total
Bulldogs	0	0	0	0	0
No. 15 (FBS) Tigers	7	24	7	14	52

at Jordan–Hare Stadium • Auburn, Alabama

- Date: November 23, 2019
- Game time: 11:06 a.m.
- Game weather: Temperature: 65° • Wind: S 11 mph • Weather: Rain
- Game attendance: 80,692
- Referee: Marc Curles
- TV announcers (SEC Network): Taylor Zarzour (play-by-play), Matt Stinchcomb (analyst), Alyssa Lang (sideline reporter)

Game information

First Quarter

- AUB – JaTarvious Whitlow 1 yd run (Anders Carlson kick), 8:13 (AUB 7–0)

Second Quarter

- AUB – JaTarvious Whitlow 3 yd run (Anders Carlson kick), 14:08 (AUB 14–0)
- AUB – Harold Joiner 10 yd pass from Bo Nix (Anders Carlson kick), 9:37 (AUB 21–0)
- AUB – Shaun Shivers 4 yd run (Anders Carlson kick), 7:14 (AUB 28–0)
- AUB – Anders Carlson 29 yd field goal, 1:16 (AUB 31–0)

Third Quarter

- AUB – D.J. Williams 2 yd run (Anders Carlson kick), 12:35 (AUB 38–0)

Fourth Quarter

- AUB – Zach Farrar 27 yd pass from Cord Sandberg (Josh Marsh kick), 13:32 (AUB 45–0)
- AUB – Zach Farrar 4 yd pass from Cord Sandberg (Josh Marsh kick), 9:23 (AUB 52–0)

Top Passers

- SAM – Liam Welch – 12–23, 66 yds, 2 INT
- AUB – Bo Nix – 15–23, 150 yds, 1 TD

Top Rushers

- SAM – Jay Stanton – 10 rushes, 19 yds
- AUB – Shaun Shivers – 9 rushes, 55 yds, 1 TD

Top Receivers

- SAM – Kendall Watson – 3 receptions, 17 yds
- AUB – Seth Williams – 4 receptions, 45 yds

== Ranking movements ==
Ranking movements Legend: — = Not ranked RV = Received votes
	Week													
Poll	Pre	1	2	3	4	5	6	7	8	9	10	11	12	Final
STATS FCS	RV													
Coaches	—													
