= 2019 Mercer Bears football team =

American college football season

2019 Mercer Bears football
- Conference: Southern Conference
- Record: 4–8 (3–5 SoCon)
- Head coach: Bobby Lamb (7th season)
- Offensive coordinator: Bill Legg (1st season)
- Defensive coordinator: Mike Adams (1st season)
- Home stadium: Five Star Stadium

2019 Southern Conference football standings
	Conf.			Overall
Team	W		L	W		L
No. 16 Wofford $^	7	–	1	8	–	3
No. 21 Furman ^	6	–	2	8	–	4
Chattanooga	5	–	3	6	–	6
The Citadel	4	–	4	6	–	6
Samford	4	–	4	5	–	7
VMI	4	–	4	5	–	7
Mercer	3	–	5	4	–	8
Western Carolina	2	–	6	3	–	9
East Tennessee State	1	–	7	3	–	9
$ – Conference champion; ^ – FCS playoff participant; Rankings from STATS Poll

The 2019 Mercer Bears football team represented Mercer University as a member the Southern Conference (SoCon) during the 2019 NCAA Division I FCS football season. They were led by seventh-year head coach Bobby Lamb and played their home games at the Five Star Stadium in Macon, Georgia. Mercer finished the season 4–8 overall and 3–5 in SoCon play to place seventh.

== Preseason ==
=== Preseason media poll ===
The SoCon released their preseason media poll and coaches poll on July 22, 2019. The Bears were picked to finish in fourth place by the media and in fifth place by the coaches.

=== Preseason All-SoCon Teams ===
The Bears placed seven different players on the preseason all-SoCon teams.

Offense

1st team

Tyray Devezin – RB

Austin Sanders – OL

2nd team

Chris Ellington – TE

David Durden – WR

Defense

2nd team

Dorian Kithcart – DL

Will Coneway – LB

Malique Fleming – DB

Specialists

1st team

David Durden – RS

== Schedule ==
Date	Time	Opponent	Site	TV	Result	Attendance
August 31	6:00 p.m.	at Western Carolina	E. J. Whitmire Stadium; Cullowhee, NC	Nexstar/ESPN+	W 49–27	10,542
September 7 (Note: On September 2, it was announced that Mercer had added an away game against Presbyterian; the date was originally a bye week for Mercer and was scheduled after Presbyterian's week 1 game against Stetson was cancelled.)	2:00 p.m.	at Presbyterian*	Bailey Memorial Stadium; Clinton, SC	ESPN+	W 45–7	1,264
September 14	7:00 p.m.	Austin Peay*	Five Star Stadium; Macon, GA	ESPN+	L 34–48	11,478
September 21	1:00 p.m.	at No. 17 Furman	Paladin Stadium; Greenville, SC	Nexstar/ESPN+	L 10–45	7,667
September 28	7:00 p.m.	Campbell*	Five Star Stadium; Macon, GA	ESPN3	L 27–34	11,272
October 5	4:00 p.m.	Chattanooga	Five Star Stadium; Macon, GA	ESPN+	L 17–34	8,972
October 19	3:00 p.m.	VMI	Five Star Stadium; Macon, GA	ESPN+	W 34–27	5,714
October 26	2:00 p.m.	at The Citadel	Johnson Hagood Stadium; Charleston, SC	ESPN+	L 24–35	11,439
November 2	7:00 p.m.	Samford	Five Star Stadium; Macon, GA	ESPN+	W 36–33 ^{3OT}	8,272
November 9	3:00 p.m.	No. 24 Wofford	Five Star Stadium; Macon, GA	ESPN+	L 7–41	10,729
November 16	1:00 p.m.	at East Tennessee State	William B. Greene Jr. Stadium; Johnson City, TN	ESPN3	L 33–38	7,121
November 23	3:30 p.m.	at North Carolina*	Kenan Memorial Stadium; Chapel Hill, NC	ACCRSN	L 7–56	50,500
*Non-conference game; Rankings from STATS Poll released prior to the game; All times are in Eastern time

== Game summaries ==
=== At Western Carolina ===
	1	2	3	4	Total
Bears	14	28	7	0	49
Catamounts	7	7	7	6	27

=== At Presbyterian ===
	1	2	3	4	Total
Bears	21	7	14	3	45
Blue Hose	0	0	0	7	7

=== Austin Peay ===
	1	2	3	4	Total
Governors	7	6	14	21	48
Bears	10	3	7	14	34

=== At Furman ===
	1	2	3	4	Total
Bears	0	10	0	0	10
No. 17 Paladins	14	14	17	0	45

=== Campbell ===
	1	2	3	4	Total
Fighting Camels	6	7	7	14	34
Bears	0	6	7	14	27

=== Chattanooga ===
	1	2	3	4	Total
Mocs	7	10	10	7	34
Bears	14	0	0	3	17

=== VMI ===
	1	2	3	4	Total
Keydets	3	3	0	21	27
Bears	3	10	14	7	34

=== At The Citadel ===
	1	2	3	4	Total
Bears	0	10	14	0	24
Bulldogs	7	7	7	14	35

=== Samford ===
	1	2	3	4	OT	2OT	3OT	Total
Bulldogs	7	3	7	6	7	3	0	33
Bears	3	7	6	7	7	3	3	36

=== Wofford ===
	1	2	3	4	Total
Terriers	3	17	14	7	41
Bears	0	7	0	0	7

=== At East Tennessee State ===
	1	2	3	4	Total
Bears	7	7	6	13	33
Buccaneers	10	21	0	7	38

=== At North Carolina ===
	1	2	3	4	Total
Bears	0	0	0	7	7
Tar Heels	21	21	14	0	56

== Ranking movements ==
Ranking movements Legend: RV = Received votes
	Week													
Poll	Pre	1	2	3	4	5	6	7	8	9	10	11	12	Final
STATS FCS	RV													
Coaches														
