= 2019 Western Carolina Catamounts football team =

American college football season

2019 Western Carolina Catamounts football
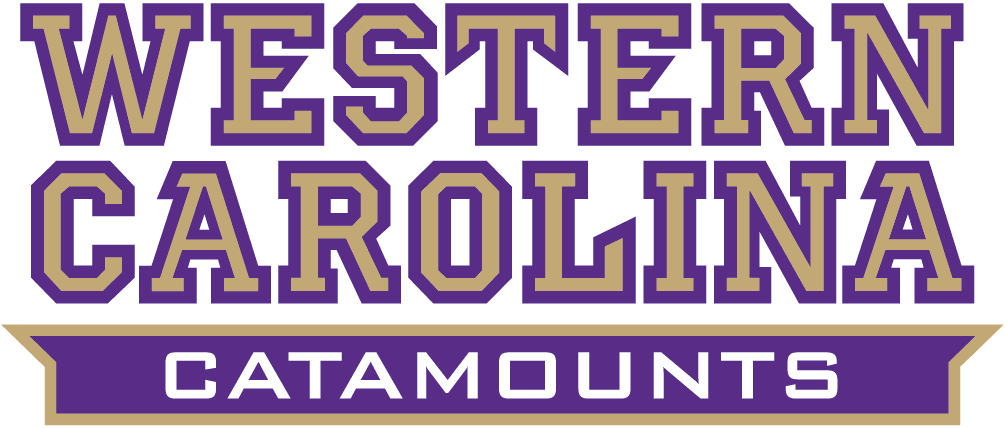
- Conference: Southern Conference
- Record: 3–9 (2–6 SoCon)
- Head coach: Mark Speir (8th season)
- Co-offensive coordinators: John Holt (1st season); Tyler Carlton (1st season)
- Defensive coordinator: John Wiley (3rd season)
- Home stadium: Bob Waters Field at E. J. Whitmire Stadium

2019 Southern Conference football standings
	Conf.			Overall
Team	W		L	W		L
No. 16 Wofford $^	7	–	1	8	–	3
No. 21 Furman ^	6	–	2	8	–	4
Chattanooga	5	–	3	6	–	6
The Citadel	4	–	4	6	–	6
Samford	4	–	4	5	–	7
VMI	4	–	4	5	–	7
Mercer	3	–	5	4	–	8
Western Carolina	2	–	6	3	–	9
East Tennessee State	1	–	7	3	–	9
$ – Conference champion; ^ – FCS playoff participant; Rankings from STATS Poll

The 2019 Western Carolina Catamounts team represented Western Carolina University as a member of the Southern Conference (SoCon) during the 2019 NCAA Division I FCS football season. Led by eighth-year head coach Mark Speir, the Catamounts compiled an overall record of 3–9 with a mark of 2–6 in conference play, placing eighth in the SoCon. Western Carolina played home games at Bob Waters Field at E. J. Whitmire Stadium in Cullowhee, North Carolina.

== Preseason ==
=== Preseason polls ===
The SoCon released their preseason media poll and coaches poll on July 22, 2019. The Catamounts were picked to finish in eighth place in both polls.

=== Preseason All-SoCon Teams ===
The Catamounts placed three players on the preseason all-SoCon teams.

Offense

1st team

Tyrie Adams – QB

Owen Cosenke – TE

Defense

1st team

Ronald Kent – DB

== Schedule ==
Date	Time	Opponent	Site	TV	Result	Attendance
August 31	6:00 p.m.	Mercer	E. J. Whitmire Stadium; Cullowhee, NC	Nexstar/ESPN+	L 27–49	10,542
September 7	12:30 p.m.	at NC State*	Carter–Finley Stadium; Raleigh, NC	FSS	L 0–41	55,681
September 14	3:30 p.m.	North Greenville*	E. J. Whitmire Stadium; Cullowhee, NC	ESPN+	W 20–17	7,216
September 28	4:00 p.m.	at Chattanooga	Finley Stadium; Chattanooga, TN	ESPN+	L 36–60	7,636
October 5	3:30 p.m.	Gardner–Webb*	E. J. Whitmire Stadium; Cullowhee, NC	ESPN+	L 21–24	11,865
October 12	2:00 p.m.	at The Citadel	Johnson Hagood Stadium; Charleston, SC	ESPN3	L 17–35	8,023
October 19	1:30 p.m.	at Wofford	Gibbs Stadium; Spartanburg, SC	Nexstar/ESPN+	L 7–59	5,733
October 26	3:30 p.m.	No. 14 Furman^{†}	E. J. Whitmire Stadium; Cullowhee, NC	ESPN3	L 7–28	8,174
November 2	1:30 p.m.	at VMI	Alumni Memorial Field; Lexington, VA	ESPN+	W 43–35	4,568
November 9	3:30 p.m.	East Tennessee State	E. J. Whitmire Stadium; Cullowhee, NC	Nexstar/ESPN+	W 23–20 ^{OT}	7,681
November 16	2:00 p.m.	Samford	E. J. Whitmire Stadium; Cullowhee, NC	ESPN+	L 13–31	7,336
November 23	12:00 pm	at No. 5 FBS Alabama*	Bryant–Denny Stadium; Tuscaloosa, AL	ESPN	L 3–66	101,821
*Non-conference game; ^{†}Homecoming; Rankings from STATS Poll released prior to the game; All times are in Eastern time

== Game summaries ==
=== Mercer ===
	1	2	3	4	Total
Bears	14	28	7	0	49
Catamounts	7	7	7	6	27

=== At NC State ===
	1	2	3	4	Total
Catamounts	0	0	0	0	0
Wolfpack	3	21	10	7	41

=== North Greenville ===
	1	2	3	4	Total
Crusaders	0	7	10	0	17
Catamounts	3	3	7	7	20

=== At Chattanooga ===
	1	2	3	4	Total
Catamounts	7	14	15	0	36
Mocs	6	31	7	16	60

=== Gardner–Webb ===
	1	2	3	4	Total
Runnin' Bulldogs	7	7	7	3	24
Catamounts	14	0	0	7	21

=== At The Citadel ===
	1	2	3	4	Total
Catamounts	3	7	7	0	17
Bulldogs	14	14	0	7	35

=== At Wofford ===
	1	2	3	4	Total
Catamounts	7	0	0	0	7
Terriers	7	28	14	10	59

=== Furman ===
	1	2	3	4	Total
No. 14 Paladins	3	10	15	0	28
Catamounts	7	0	0	0	7

=== At VMI ===
	1	2	3	4	Total
Catamounts	14	6	7	16	43
Keydets	13	6	3	13	35

=== East Tennessee State ===
	1	2	3	4	OT	Total
Buccaneers	3	0	7	7	3	20
Catamounts	3	7	0	7	6	23

=== Samford ===
	1	2	3	4	Total
Bulldogs	7	10	7	7	31
Catamounts	10	3	0	0	13

=== At Alabama ===
	1	2	3	4	Total
Catamounts	0	0	0	3	3
No. 5 (FBS) Crimson Tide	17	21	21	7	66
