= 2019 East Tennessee State Buccaneers football team =

American college football season

2019 East Tennessee State Buccaneers football
- Conference: Southern Conference
- Record: 3–9 (1–7 SoCon)
- Head coach: Randy Sanders (2nd season)
- Offensive coordinator: Mike Rader (2nd season)
- Defensive coordinator: Billy Taylor (5th season)
- Home stadium: William B. Greene Jr. Stadium

2019 Southern Conference football standings
	Conf.			Overall
Team	W		L	W		L
No. 16 Wofford $^	7	–	1	8	–	3
No. 21 Furman ^	6	–	2	8	–	4
Chattanooga	5	–	3	6	–	6
The Citadel	4	–	4	6	–	6
Samford	4	–	4	5	–	7
VMI	4	–	4	5	–	7
Mercer	3	–	5	4	–	8
Western Carolina	2	–	6	3	–	9
East Tennessee State	1	–	7	3	–	9
$ – Conference champion; ^ – FCS playoff participant; Rankings from STATS Poll

The 2019 East Tennessee State Buccaneers football team represented East Tennessee State University (ETSU) in the 2019 NCAA Division I FCS football season and were in the fourth year of their second stint as football members of the Southern Conference (SoCon). They were led by second-year head coach Randy Sanders and played their home games at William B. Greene Jr. Stadium.

== Preseason ==
=== Preseason media poll ===
The SoCon released their preseason media poll and coaches poll on July 22, 2019. The Buccaneers were picked to finish in third place in both polls.

=== Preseason All-SoCon Teams ===
The Buccaneers placed seven players on the preseason all-SoCon teams.

Offense

1st team

Quay Holmes – RB

2nd team

Ben Blackmon – OL

Tre'mond Shorts – OL

Defense

1st team

Jason Maduafokwa – DL

Nasir Player – DL

Tyree Robinson – DB

2nd team

Jeremy Lewis – DB

== Schedule ==
Date	Time	Opponent	Site	TV	Result	Attendance
August 31	3:30 p.m.	at Appalachian State*	Kidd Brewer Stadium; Boone, NC	ESPN+	L 7–42	25,147
September 7	7:30 p.m.	Shorter*	William B. Greene Jr. Stadium; Johnson City, TN	ESPN+	W 48–10	8,615
September 14	7:30 p.m.	VMI	William B. Greene Jr. Stadium; Johnson City, TN	ESPN+	L 24–31 ^{OT}	9,150
September 21	7:30 p.m.	Austin Peay*	William B. Greene Jr. Stadium; Johnson City, TN	ESPN+	W 20–14	9,350
September 28	1:00 p.m.	at No. 16 Furman	Paladin Stadium; Greenville, SC	Nexstar/ESPN+	L 10–17	5,031
October 5	3:30 p.m.	Wofford	William B. Greene Jr. Stadium; Johnson City, TN	ESPN3	L 17–35	8,242
October 17	7:00 p.m.	at Chattanooga	Finley Stadium; Chattanooga, TN	ESPN+	L 13–16	7,124
October 26	1:00 p.m.	at Samford	Seibert Stadium; Homewood, AL	ESPN+	L 17–24	1,521
November 2	3:30 p.m.	The Citadel^{†}	William B. Greene Jr. Stadium; Johnson City, TN	Nexstar/ESPN+	L 27–31	8,674
November 9	3:30 p.m.	at Western Carolina	E. J. Whitmire Stadium; Cullowhee, NC	Nexstar/ESPN+	L 20–23 ^{OT}	7,681
November 16	1:00 p.m.	Mercer	William B. Greene Jr. Stadium; Johnson City, TN	ESPN3	W 38–33	7,121
November 23	2:30 p.m.	at Vanderbilt*	Vanderbilt Stadium; Nashville, TN	SEC Alt.	L 0–38	19,863
*Non-conference game; ^{†}Homecoming; Rankings from STATS Poll released prior to the game; All times are in Eastern time

== Game summaries ==
=== At Appalachian State ===
	1	2	3	4	Total
Buccaneers	0	0	7	0	7
Mountaineers	7	7	14	14	42

=== Shorter ===
	1	2	3	4	Total
Hawks	0	3	0	7	10
Buccaneers	17	8	14	7	46

=== VMI ===
	1	2	3	4	OT	Total
Keydets	0	7	7	10	7	31
Buccaneers	0	7	3	14	0	24

=== Austin Peay ===
	1	2	3	4	Total
Governors	7	7	0	0	14
Buccaneers	3	7	0	10	20

=== At Furman ===
	1	2	3	4	Total
Buccaneers	0	7	3	0	10
No. 16 Paladins	7	3	0	7	17

=== Wofford ===
	1	2	3	4	Total
Terriers	7	21	0	7	35
Buccaneers	0	3	7	7	17

=== At Chattanooga ===
	1	2	3	4	Total
Buccaneers	0	13	0	0	13
Mocs	7	0	6	3	16

=== At Samford ===
	1	2	3	4	Total
Buccaneers	0	14	0	3	17
Bulldogs	7	0	10	7	24

=== The Citadel ===
	1	2	3	4	Total
Bulldogs	7	3	7	14	31
Buccaneers	10	3	7	7	27

=== At Western Carolina ===
	1	2	3	4	OT	Total
Buccaneers	3	0	7	7	3	20
Catamounts	3	7	0	7	6	23

=== Mercer ===
	1	2	3	4	Total
Bears	7	7	6	13	33
Buccaneers	10	21	0	7	38

=== At Vanderbilt ===
	1	2	3	4	Total
Buccaneers	0	0	0	0	0
Commodores	7	7	17	7	38
