= 2019 The Citadel Bulldogs football team =

American college football season

2019 The Citadel Bulldogs football
- Conference: Southern Conference
- Record: 6–6 (4–4 SoCon)
- Head coach: Brent Thompson (4th season)
- Offensive coordinator: Lou Conte (4th season)
- Offensive scheme: Triple option
- Defensive coordinator: Tony Grantham (1st season)
- Base defense: 3–4
- Home stadium: Johnson Hagood Stadium

2019 Southern Conference football standings
	Conf.			Overall
Team	W		L	W		L
No. 16 Wofford $^	7	–	1	8	–	3
No. 21 Furman ^	6	–	2	8	–	4
Chattanooga	5	–	3	6	–	6
The Citadel	4	–	4	6	–	6
Samford	4	–	4	5	–	7
VMI	4	–	4	5	–	7
Mercer	3	–	5	4	–	8
Western Carolina	2	–	6	3	–	9
East Tennessee State	1	–	7	3	–	9
$ – Conference champion; ^ – FCS playoff participant; Rankings from STATS Poll

The 2019 The Citadel Bulldogs football team represented The Citadel, The Military College of South Carolina in the 2019 NCAA Division I FCS football season. The Bulldogs were led by fourth-year head coach Brent Thompson and played their home games at Johnson Hagood Stadium. They were members of the Southern Conference (SoCon).

== Preseason ==
=== Preseason media poll ===
The SoCon released their preseason media poll and coaches poll on July 22, 2019. The Bulldogs were picked to finish in 7th place in both polls.

=== Preseason All-SoCon Teams ===
The Bulldogs placed six players on the preseason all-SoCon teams.

Offense

2nd team

Haden Haas – OL

Drew McEntyre – OL

Defense

1st team

Joseph Randolph II – DL

Willie Eubanks III – LB

Specialists

1st team

Matthew Campbell – P

2nd team

Jacob Godek – PK

== Schedule ==
Date	Time	Opponent	Rank	Site	TV	Result	Attendance
August 31	3:00 p.m.	No. 11 Towson*		Johnson Hagood Stadium; Charleston, SC	ESPN+	L 21–28	8,008
September 7	2:00 p.m.	at Elon*		Rhodes Stadium; Elon, NC	FloSports	L 28–35	5,071
September 14	12:30 p.m.	at Georgia Tech*		Bobby Dodd Stadium; Atlanta, GA	ACCRSN	W 27–24 ^{OT}	42,871
September 21	6:00 p.m.	Charleston Southern*	No. 25	Johnson Hagood Stadium; Charleston, SC	ESPN+	W 22–13	9,626
September 28	3:00 p.m.	at Samford	No. 25	Seibert Stadium; Birmingham, AL	ESPN+	L 55–61 ^{4OT}	3,524
October 5	2:00 p.m.	VMI		Johnson Hagood Stadium; Charleston, SC (Military Classic of the South)	ESPN+	L 21–34	12,126
October 12	2:00 p.m.	Western Carolina		Johnson Hagood Stadium; Charleston, SC	ESPN3	W 35–17	8,023
October 19	1:00 p.m.	at No. 8 Furman		Paladin Stadium; Greenville, SC (rivalry)	ESPN3	W 27–10	6,603
October 26	2:00 p.m.	Mercer^{†}		Johnson Hagood Stadium; Charleston, SC	ESPN+	W 35–24	11,439
November 2	3:30 p.m.	at East Tennessee State		William B. Greene Jr. Stadium; Johnson City, TN	ESPN3	W 31–27	8,674
November 16	2:00 p.m.	at Chattanooga		Finley Stadium; Chattanooga, TN	ESPN+	L 33–34	7,363
November 23	12:00 p.m.	No. 14 Wofford		Johnson Hagood Stadium; Charleston, SC (rivalry)	ESPN+	L 11–31	6,844
*Non-conference game; ^{†}Homecoming; Rankings from STATS Poll released prior to the game; All times are in Eastern time

== Roster ==
2019 The Citadel Bulldogs football team roster
Players
Coaches
Offense

Pos.	#	Name	Class
QB	1	Evan Schickel	Fr
FB	5	Clay Harris	So
RB	8	Keyonte Sessions	Jr
QB	11	Cooper Wallace	Fr
WR	12	Ryan McCarthy	So
WR	13	Cole Owens	So
WR	15	Jalen Smith	Fr
QB	16	Brandon Rainey	Jr
FB	18	Dante Smith	So
QB	19	Brian Murdaugh	Jr
FB	21	Remus Butler	Sr
WR	22	Raleigh Webb	Jr
FB	23	Keefe White	Fr
FB	28	Nkem Nkoju	So
FB	32	Emeka Nwanze	Fr
RB	33	Darique Hampton	Fr
FB	34	Sam Llewellyn	Fr
RB	37	Stephon Eugene	Jr
FB	38	Logan Billings	Fr
FB	43	Hoss Smith	Jr
FB	46	Donnie Brechtel III	So
OL	52	Jon Barrett Lewis	Jr
OL	53	Tereis Drayton	Fr
OL	54	Haden Haas	So
OL	56	Ronald Prince	Fr
OL	57	Blake Harrison	So
OL	58	Denzel Wright	Jr
OL	59	Kevin Wilson	So
OL	61	Mark Weakland	Jr
OL	63	Drew McIntyre	Sr
OL	64	Stephon Stokes	Fr
OL	65	Johnathan Toole	Fr
OL	67	Prince Howard-Whitaker	Jr
OL	69	Tyrell Earl	Fr
OL	71	Charley Conley	Jr
OL	73	Ben Brockington	Fr
OL	74	Nick Hudgens	Jr
OL	78	Thomas Crawford	So
TE	80	Thomas Wyatt	Fr
WR	82	Rashad Riley	Jr
WR	84	Laim Reid	So
WR	87	Cameron Roberts	So
TE	89	Elijah Lowe	Jr
RB		Jack Alvarez	Fr
QB		Nathan Cronic	Fr
WR		Damian Crowson	So
RB		Dexter Freeman	So
TE		Daniel Hollister	Fr
WR		Carter Moody	So
WR		Steven White	Fr
TE		Jeffrey Wood	So

Defense

Pos.	#	Name	Class
DB	2	Andy Davis	Fr
LB	3	Airan Reed	Sr
LB	4	Phil Davis	Sr
DB	6	Lane Botkin	So
DB	7	Destin Mack	So
LB	9	Willie Eubanks III	Jr
DB	10	Torian Spencer	Fr
DB	11	Phil Barrett	Jr
DB	17	Chris Beverly	So
DB	20	Jay Howard	So
DB	24	Jay Girdner	Fr
LB	25	Sean-Thomas Faulkner	So
DB	26	Bud Chaney	Fr
DB	27	Jaylan Adams	Fr
DB	29	Ryland Akers	So
DB	30	Jake Kenison	Fr
LB	31	Von Ramsey	Fr
CB	33	Javonte Middleton	Fr
DB	35	Antareus Pressley	Fr
LB	36	Joe Douglas	So
DB	39	Nehemiah McIntosh	Fr
LB	40	Hayden Williamson	Fr
LB	41	Kyler Estes	So
DB	42	Nic Trocha	Sr
LB	43	Logan Braucht	Fr
DL	44	Nick Grier	Fr
LB	45	Brian Horn	So
LB	47	Jay Lagroon	Fr
DL	48	Gunner Covey	Jr
LB	49	Marquise Blount	So
LB	50	Caleb Devoux	Fr
LB	51	Collin Flanders	So
LB	55	Eric Vettel	Jr
DL	60	Jay Smith	So
DL	68	Sidney Starr	Fr
DL	70	Robert Harbor	Fr
DL	72	Dalton Owens	So
DL	75	Hi'Keem Elmore	Fr
DL	76	Dewey Greene IV	Fr
LB	77	Palmer Story	So
DL	79	Jeb Lawson	Fr
LB	81	Ronald Reid	Fr
LB	83	Michael McDowell	Fr
LB	88	Anthony Britton Jr.	Fr
DL	92	Aaron Brawley	Jr
DL	94	Brian Bowersox	Fr
DL	95	Blake Oliveira	So
DL	96	Hasan Black	Fr
DL	97	Jabauri Garner	So
DL	98	Joseph Randolph II	Sr
DL	99	Christian Weyrich	So
DL		Wes Carlay	So
LB		Robert Demarre	So
LB		Robert Fisher	So
DB		Huw Meredith	Fr
DB		Nate Thomas	So
LB		Jackson Watson	Fr

Special teams

Pos.	#	Name	Class
LS	62	Trey Gable	Fr
K	69	Joshua Roides	Jr
LS	85	Patrick Keefe	Sr
K	86	Jacob Godek	Sr
P	90	Matt Campbell	So
P	93	Gage Russell	Jr
LS		Steele Judy	Fr

Head coach

- Brent Thompson (4th season)

Coordinators/assistant coaches

- Tony Grantham – Defensive Coordinator / Linebackers
- Lou Conte - Offensive Coordinator / QBs / B-Backs
- Turner West - Special Teams / Recruiting Coordinator
- Ron Boyd - Offensive Line
- Orlando Mitjans Jr. - Cornerbacks
- Brian Rucker - Wide Receivers
- John Ward - Defensive Line
- Ben Hodges - Inside Linebackers
- Kevin Westin - Outside Linebackers
- Bobby Ruff - Tackles / Tight Ends
- Donnell Boucher - Strength and Conditioning
- Floris Mendonca - Video Coordinator
- Kate Yeager - Director of Personnel
- Will Christopher - Director of Football Operations

Legend

- (C) Team captain
- (S) Suspended
- (I) Ineligible
- Injured
- Redshirt

Roster
Last update: July 1, 2020

== Game summaries ==
=== Towson ===
	1	2	3	4	Total
No. 11 Tigers	7	10	0	11	28
Bulldogs	0	14	0	7	21

=== At Elon ===
	1	2	3	4	Total
Bulldogs	0	7	7	14	28
Phoenix	7	14	7	7	35

=== At Georgia Tech ===
	1	2	3	4	OT	Total
Bulldogs	7	7	7	3	3	27
Yellow Jackets	0	6	8	10	0	24

=== Charleston Southern ===
	1	2	3	4	Total
Buccaneers	0	3	3	7	13
No. 25 Bulldogs	0	7	13	2	22

=== At Samford ===
	1	2	3	4	OT	2OT	3OT	4OT	Total
No. 25 CIT Bulldogs	7	7	7	17	7	7	3	0	55
SAM Bulldogs	7	3	14	14	7	7	3	6	61

=== VMI ===
	1	2	3	4	Total
Keydets	7	10	7	10	34
Bulldogs	7	0	7	7	21

=== Western Carolina ===
	1	2	3	4	Total
Catamounts	3	7	7	0	17
Bulldogs	14	14	0	7	35

=== At Furman ===
	1	2	3	4	Total
Bulldogs	7	0	14	6	27
No. 8 Paladins	3	0	0	7	10

=== Mercer ===
	1	2	3	4	Total
Bears	0	10	14	0	24
Bulldogs	7	7	7	14	35

=== At East Tennessee State ===
	1	2	3	4	Total
Bulldogs	7	3	7	14	31
Buccaneers	10	3	7	7	27

=== At Chattanooga ===
	1	2	3	4	Total
Bulldogs	2	7	17	7	33
Mocs	12	0	0	22	34

=== Wofford ===
	1	2	3	4	Total
No. 14 Terriers	14	0	14	3	31
Bulldogs	0	0	3	8	11

== Ranking movements ==
Ranking movements Legend: ██ Increase in ranking ██ Decrease in ranking — = Not ranked RV = Received votes
	Week													
Poll	Pre	1	2	3	4	5	6	7	8	9	10	11	12	Final
STATS FCS	RV	RV	RV	25	25									
Coaches	RV	RV	—	RV	RV									
