= 2019 Wofford Terriers football team =

American college football season

2019 Wofford Terriers football

SoCon champion

FCS Playoffs First Round, L 21–28 vs. Kennesaw State
- Conference: Southern Conference

Ranking
- STATS: No. 16
- FCS Coaches: No. 17
- Record: 8–4 (7–1 SoCon)
- Head coach: Josh Conklin (2nd season)
- Offensive coordinator: Wade Lang (32nd season)
- Defensive coordinator: Sam Siefkes (2nd season)
- Home stadium: Gibbs Stadium

2019 Southern Conference football standings
	Conf.			Overall
Team	W		L	W		L
No. 16 Wofford $^	7	–	1	8	–	3
No. 21 Furman ^	6	–	2	8	–	4
Chattanooga	5	–	3	6	–	6
The Citadel	4	–	4	6	–	6
Samford	4	–	4	5	–	7
VMI	4	–	4	5	–	7
Mercer	3	–	5	4	–	8
Western Carolina	2	–	6	3	–	9
East Tennessee State	1	–	7	3	–	9
$ – Conference champion; ^ – FCS playoff participant; Rankings from STATS Poll

The 2019 Wofford Terriers football team represented Wofford College in the 2019 NCAA Division I FCS football season. They were led by second-year head coach Josh Conklin and played their home games at Gibbs Stadium. They were a member of the Southern Conference (SoCon).

== Preseason ==
=== Preseason polls ===
The SoCon released their preseason media poll and coaches poll on July 22, 2019. The Terriers were picked to finish in first place in both polls.

=== Preseason All-SoCon Teams ===
The Terriers placed nine players on the preseason all-SoCon teams.

Offense

1st team

Justus Basinger – OL

Michael Ralph – OL

2nd team

Blake Jeresaty – OL

Defense

1st team

Thad Mangum – DL

2nd team

Mikel Horton – DL

Jireh Wilson – LB

Mason Alstatt – DB

George Gbesee – DB

Specialists

2nd team

Luke Carter – P

== Schedule ==
Date	Time	Opponent	Rank	Site	TV	Result	Attendance
August 31	6:00 p.m.	at South Carolina State*	No. 9	Oliver C. Dawson Stadium; Orangeburg, SC	ESPN3	L 13–28	8,187
September 14	6:00 p.m.	Samford*	No. 21	Gibbs Stadium; Spartanburg, SC	ESPN3/Nexstar	L 14–21	3,463
September 21	6:00 p.m.	Gardner–Webb*		Gibbs Stadium; Spartanburg, SC	ESPN+	W 49–10	3,777
September 28	1:30 p.m.	at VMI		Alumni Memorial Field; Lexington, VA	ESPN+	W 51–36	3,300
October 5	3:30 p.m.	at East Tennessee State		William B. Greene Jr. Stadium; Johnson City, TN	ESPN3	W 35–17	8,242
October 19	1:30 p.m.	Western Carolina^{†}		Gibbs Stadium; Spartanburg, SC	ESPN+/Nexstar	W 59–7	5,733
October 26	1:30 p.m.	Chattanooga		Gibbs Stadium; Spartanburg, SC	ESPN+/Nexstar	W 35–34 ^{OT}	4,445
November 2	4:00 p.m.	at No. 5 FBS Clemson*	No. 23	Memorial Stadium; Clemson, SC	ACCN	L 14–59	81,500
November 9	3:00 p.m.	at Mercer	No. 24	Five Star Stadium; Macon, GA	ESPN+	W 41–7	10,729
November 16	1:30 p.m.	No. 9 Furman	No. 21	Gibbs Stadium; Spartanburg, SC (rivalry)	ESPN+/Nexstar	W 24–7	6,457
November 23	12:00 p.m.	at The Citadel	No. 14	Johnson Hagood Stadium; Charleston, SC (rivalry)	ESPN+	W 31–11	6,844
November 30	3:00 p.m.	No. 15 Kennesaw State*	No. 11	Gibbs Stadium; Spartanburg, SC (NCAA Division I First Round)	ESPN3	L 21–28	1,992
*Non-conference game; ^{†}Homecoming; Rankings from STATS Poll released prior to the game; All times are in Eastern time

== Game summaries ==
=== At South Carolina State ===
	1	2	3	4	Total
No. 9 Terriers	3	0	3	7	13
Bulldogs	7	7	7	7	28

=== Samford ===
	1	2	3	4	Total
Bulldogs	14	0	7	0	21
No. 21 Terriers	14	0	0	0	14

=== Gardner–Webb ===
	1	2	3	4	Total
Runnin' Bulldogs	0	3	0	7	10
Terriers	14	14	0	21	49

=== At VMI ===
	1	2	3	4	Total
Terriers	21	14	6	10	51
Keydets	10	14	0	12	36

=== At East Tennessee State ===
	1	2	3	4	Total
Terriers	7	21	0	7	35
Buccaneers	0	3	7	7	17

=== Western Carolina ===
	1	2	3	4	Total
Catamounts	7	0	0	0	7
Terriers	7	28	14	10	59

=== Chattanooga ===
	1	2	3	4	OT	Total
Mocs	7	7	0	14	6	34
Terriers	0	14	7	7	7	35

=== At Clemson ===
	1	2	3	4	Total
No. 23 Terriers	0	0	14	0	14
No. 4 (FBS) Tigers	21	21	14	3	59

=== At Mercer ===
	1	2	3	4	Total
Terriers	3	17	14	7	41
Bears	0	7	0	0	7

=== Furman ===
	1	2	3	4	Total
No. 9 Paladins	7	0	0	0	7
No. 21 Terriers	7	7	7	3	24

=== At The Citadel ===
	1	2	3	4	Total
No. 14 Terriers	14	0	14	3	31
Bulldogs	0	0	3	8	11

== FCS Playoffs ==
The Terriers received an automatic bid (due to winning their conference) for the postseason tournament, with a first-round pairing against Kennesaw State.

=== Kennesaw State–First Round ===
	1	2	3	4	Total
No. 15 Owls	0	7	7	14	28
No. 11 Terriers	7	0	7	7	21

== Rankings ==
Ranking movements Legend: ██ Increase in ranking ██ Decrease in ranking
	Week													
Poll	Pre	1	2	3	4	5	6	7	8	9	10	11	12	Final
STATS FCS	9	19												
Coaches	8	20												
