= 2019 Furman Paladins football team =

American college football season

2019 Furman Paladins football

NCAA Division I First Round, L 6–42 vs. Austin Peay
- Conference: Southern Conference

Ranking
- STATS: No. 21
- FCS Coaches: No. 19
- Record: 8–5 (6–2 SoCon)
- Head coach: Clay Hendrix (3rd season)
- Offensive coordinator: George Quarles (2nd season)
- Defensive coordinator: Duane Vaughn (1st season)
- Captains: Andy Godwin; Bo Layton; Donavan Perryman; Jordan Willis
- Home stadium: Paladin Stadium

2019 Southern Conference football standings
	Conf.			Overall
Team	W		L	W		L
No. 16 Wofford $^	7	–	1	8	–	3
No. 21 Furman ^	6	–	2	8	–	4
Chattanooga	5	–	3	6	–	6
The Citadel	4	–	4	6	–	6
Samford	4	–	4	5	–	7
VMI	4	–	4	5	–	7
Mercer	3	–	5	4	–	8
Western Carolina	2	–	6	3	–	9
East Tennessee State	1	–	7	3	–	9
$ – Conference champion; ^ – FCS playoff participant; Rankings from STATS Poll

The 2019 Furman Paladins team represented Furman University as a member of the Southern Conference (SoCon) during the 2019 NCAA Division I FCS football season. Led by third-year head coach Clay Hendrix, the Paladins compiled an overall record of 8–5 with a mark of 6–2 in conference play, placing second in the SoCon. Furman received an at-large bid to the NCAA Division I Football Championship playoffs, where they lost to Austin Peay in the first round. The team played home games at Paladin Stadium in Greenville, South Carolina.

== Preseason ==
=== Preseason polls ===
The SoCon released their preseason media poll and coaches poll on July 22, 2019. The Paladins were picked to finish in second place in both polls.

=== Preseason All-SoCon Teams ===
The Paladins placed seven players on the preseason all-SoCon teams.

Offense

1st team

Bo Layton – OL

2nd team

Devin Wynn – RB

Andy Godwin – OL

Thomas Gordon – WR

Defense

1st team

Adrian Hope – LB

2nd team

Elijah McKoy – LB

Specialists

1st team

Grayson Atkins – K

== Schedule ==
Date	Time	Opponent	Rank	Site	TV	Result	Attendance
August 31	1:00 p.m.	Charleston Southern*	No. 19	Paladin Stadium; Greenville, SC	ESPN+	W 46–13	6,146
September 7	7:00 p.m.	at Georgia State*	No. 17	Georgia State Stadium; Atlanta, GA	ESPN3	L 42–48	20,351
September 14	12:00 p.m.	at Virginia Tech*	No. 16	Lane Stadium; Blacksburg, VA	ACCN	L 17–24	52,314
September 21	1:00 p.m.	Mercer	No. 17	Paladin Stadium; Greenville, SC	Nexstar/ESPN+	W 45–10	7,667
September 28	1:00 p.m.	East Tennessee State	No. 16	Paladin Stadium; Greenville, SC	Nexstar/ESPN+	W 17–10	5,031
October 5	3:00 p.m.	at Samford	No. 14	Seibert Stadium; Homewood, AL	Nexstar/ESPN+	W 58–14	6,169
October 19	1:00 p.m.	The Citadel^{†}	No. 8	Paladin Stadium; Greenville, SC (rivalry)	ESPN3	L 10–27	6,603
October 26	3:30 p.m.	at Western Carolina	No. 14	E.J. Whitmire Stadium; Cullowhee, NC	ESPN3	W 28–7	8,174
November 2	2:00 p.m.	at Chattanooga	No. 13	Finley Stadium; Chattanooga, TN	ESPN+	W 35–20	7,431
November 9	1:00 p.m.	VMI	No. 9	Paladin Stadium; Greenville, SC	ESPN+	W 60–21	7,229
November 16	1:30 p.m.	at No. 21 Wofford	No. 9	Gibbs Stadium; Spartanburg, SC (rivalry)	Nexstar/ESPN+	L 7–24	6,457
November 23	1:00 p.m.	Point*	No. 17	Paladin Stadium; Greenville, SC	ESPN+	W 64–7	3,207
November 30	1:00 p.m.	at No. 18 Austin Peay*	No. 16	Fortera Stadium; Clarksville, TN (NCAA Division I First Round)	ESPN3	L 6–42	3,559
*Non-conference game; ^{†}Homecoming; Rankings from STATS Poll released prior to the game; All times are in Eastern time

== Game summaries ==
=== Charleston Southern ===
	1	2	3	4	Total
Buccaneers	0	6	7	0	13
No. 19 Paladins	7	17	8	14	46

=== At Georgia State ===
	1	2	3	4	Total
No. 17 Paladins	13	7	8	14	42
Panthers	3	14	21	10	48

=== At Virginia Tech ===
	1	2	3	4	Total
No. 16 Paladins	0	14	0	3	17
Hokies	3	0	14	7	24

=== Mercer ===
	1	2	3	4	Total
Bears	0	10	0	0	10
No. 17 Paladins	14	14	17	0	45

=== East Tennessee State ===
	1	2	3	4	Total
Buccaneers	0	7	3	0	10
No. 16 Paladins	7	3	0	7	17

=== At Samford ===
	1	2	3	4	Total
No. 14 Paladins	28	14	10	6	58
Bulldogs	7	7	0	0	14

=== The Citadel ===
	1	2	3	4	Total
Bulldogs	7	0	14	6	27
No. 8 Paladins	3	0	0	7	10

=== At Western Carolina ===
	1	2	3	4	Total
No. 14 Paladins	3	10	15	0	28
Catamounts	7	0	0	0	7

=== At Chattanooga ===
	1	2	3	4	Total
No. 13 Paladins	0	14	7	14	35
Mocs	3	9	0	8	20

=== VMI ===
	1	2	3	4	Total
Keydets	7	14	0	0	21
No. 9 Paladins	15	17	14	14	60

=== At Wofford ===
	1	2	3	4	Total
No. 9 Paladins	7	0	0	0	7
No. 21 Terriers	7	7	7	3	24

=== Point ===
	1	2	3	4	Total
Skyhawks	0	7	0	0	7
No. 17 Paladins	21	22	14	7	64

=== At Austin Peay—FCS First Round ===
	1	2	3	4	Total
No. 16 Paladins	0	3	0	3	6
No. 18 Governors	7	0	28	7	42

The Paladins were selected for the postseason tournament, with a first-round pairing against Austin Peay.

== Rankings ==
Ranking movements Legend: ██ Increase in ranking ██ Decrease in ranking
	Week														
Poll	Pre	1	2	3	4	5	6	7	8	9	10	11	12	13	Final
STATS FCS	19	17	16	17	16	14	11	8	14	13	9	9	17	16	
Coaches	17	11	13	15	15	14	11	8	14	13	10	7	15	16	
