= Tyrie Adams =

American gridiron football player (born 1997)

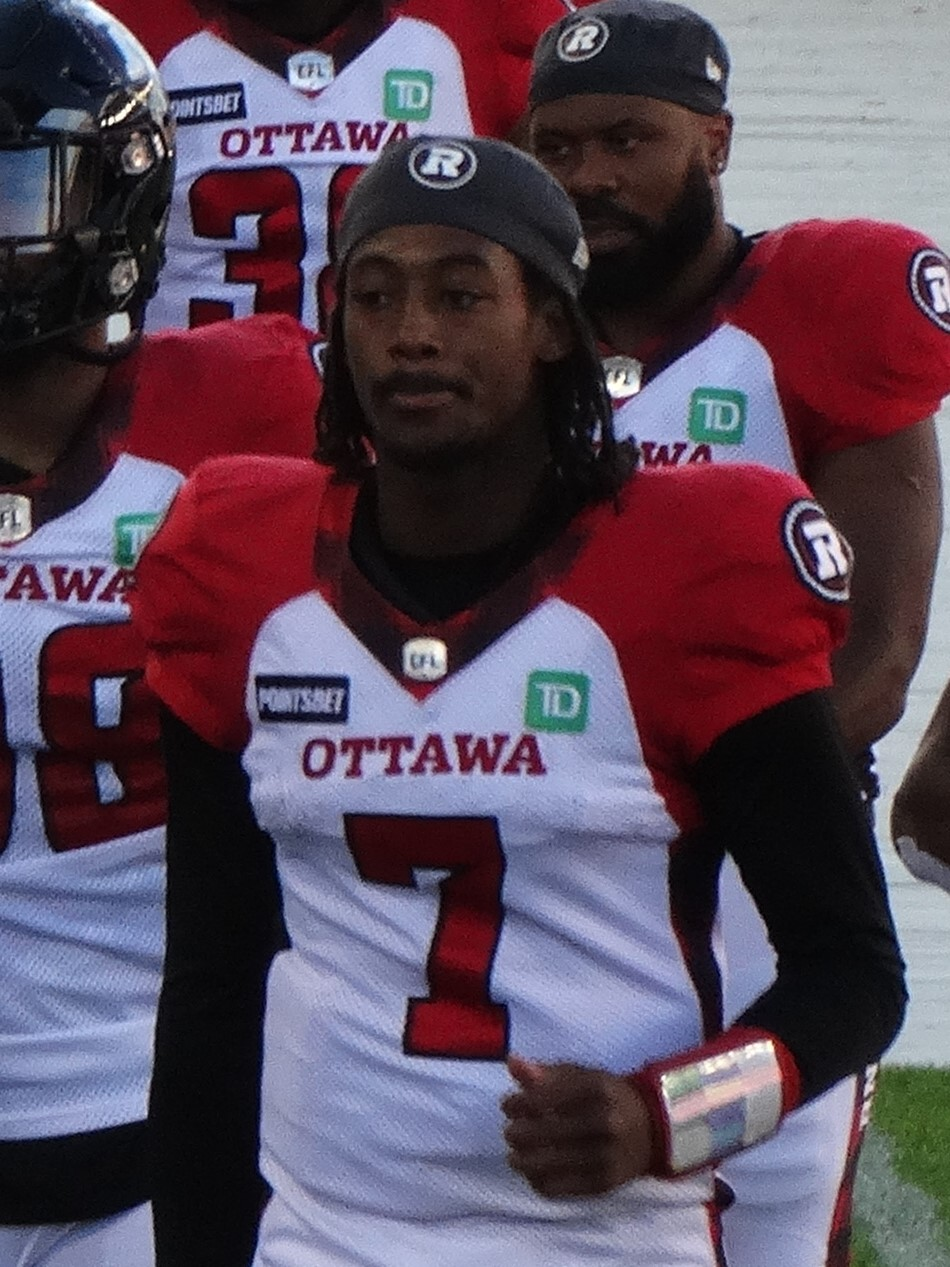
- Adams with the Ottawa Redblacks in 2022

Profile
- Position: Quarterback

Personal information
- Born: May 26, 1997 (age 29); St. Petersburg, Florida, U.S.
- Listed height: 6 ft 2 in (1.88 m)
- Listed weight: 185 lb (84 kg)

Career information
- High school: Dixie M. Hollins High
- College: Western Carolina
- NFL draft: 2020: undrafted

Career history
- 2021–2022: Salina Liberty
- 2022–2025: Ottawa Redblacks
- 2026: Salina Liberty
- 2026: BC Lions

Career CFL statistics as of 2025
- Games played: 23
- Pass completions: 67
- Pass attempts: 107
- Passing yards: 817
- TD–INT: 5–6
- Rushing yards: 116
- Stats at CFL.ca

Tyrie Andrico Adams (born May 26, 1997) is an American professional football quarterback. He was most recently a member of the BC Lions of the Canadian Football League (CFL).

== Early life ==
Adams attended Hollins High School in St. Petersburg, Florida. During high school, he played football and basketball quarterback and did the high jump. He was named to the Tampa Tribune All-Pinellas County football second team. As a senior, he threw for 2,802 yards and 30 touchdowns. He was named first team All-Tampa in track and field in the high jump.

== College career ==
After using a redshirt season in 2015, Adams played college football for the Western Carolina Catamounts from 2016 to 2019. He played in 44 games with the team where he finished as the program's all-time leader in pass completions (739), pass attempts (1,172), passing yards (8,978), passing touchdowns (64), and total offensive yards (11,525). He also finished fifth in program history in career rushing yards with 2,547, which was also the most by a quarterback.

== Professional career ==
=== Salina Liberty (first stint) ===
In 2021, Adams signed with the Salina Liberty of Champions Indoor Football (CIF). He competed with fellow quarterback Mitch Kidd for the starting job. In the non-conference season opener against the Arlington Longhorns, Adams relieved Kidd and played until leaving the game in the second quarter with a minor injury. Kidd started the conference season opener, but Adams replaced him in the second half and was later named the starter moving forward. He led the Liberty to five consecutive wins before suffering an injury in a Week 8 matchup against the Sioux City Bandits that sidelined him for the next three games. Adams returned in Week 10 for the regular-season finale against the Wichita Force, completing eight of 12 passes for 81 yards and three touchdowns in a 54–33 victory. The Liberty finished the regular season with a 10–1 overall record and a 9–1 conference record. In the semifinals against the Dodge City Law, Adams completed 12 of 16 passes for 113 yards and five touchdowns in a 51–31 victory, advancing the Liberty to the championship game. In Champions Bowl VI against the Omaha Beef, he completed five of nine passes for 40 yards with one touchdown and one interception while adding 26 rushing yards and a rushing touchdown as the Liberty fell 40–39. On the season, Adams completed 83 of 117 passes for 944 yards, 25 touchdowns, and three interceptions, earning Champions Indoor Football Offensive Rookie of the Year honors.

In 2022, Adams returned as the Liberty's starting quarterback. In the season-opening win against the Topeka Tropics, he completed 15 of 20 passes for 183 yards and three touchdowns while rushing for 26 yards and a touchdown. The following week, in a rematch of the previous season's championship game against the Omaha Beef, Adams completed 17 of 25 passes for 118 yards and two touchdowns while rushing for a team-high 60 yards and a touchdown in a 36–31 victory. Adams appeared in four games, posting a 3–1 overall record and a 2–1 conference record before signing with the Canadian Football League. The Liberty later finished the season with a 7–3 record and defeated Omaha again in Champions Bowl VII, winning 38–34.

=== Ottawa Redblacks ===
On April 21, 2022, it was announced that Adams had signed with the Ottawa Redblacks. Following 2022 training camp, he made the team's active roster as the third-string quarterback and dressed for his first CFL game on June 10, against the Winnipeg Blue Bombers. Aside from being used in short yardage situations, Adams saw his first meaningful game action in the final game of the regular season on October 29, where he completed eight of 12 passes for 98 yards and had three rush attempts for 30 yards. He dressed in six regular season games in 2022 while spending the rest of the season on the practice roster.

In 2023, Adams once again began the season as the team's third-string quarterback. However, as starting quarterback Jeremiah Masoli was not healthy to begin the season and backup Nick Arbuckle struggled, Adams was called into action in Week 2. He completed seven of 13 pass attempts for 88 yards. He was announced as the team's starting quarterback for Week 4. In his first career start, on June 30, 2023, Adams completed 14 of 20 pass attempts for 185 yards and one touchdown and had three carries for 31 yards to lead the Redblacks to a victory over the Edmonton Elks. On July 5, 2023, the Redblacks announced that Adams would miss the remainder of the season with a torn ACL.

On October 9, 2024, the Redblacks signed Adams to a one-year contract extension. Adams became a free agent upon the expiry of his contract on February 10, 2026.

=== Salina Liberty (second stint) ===
On May 21, 2026, Adams re-signed with the Salina Liberty of the National Arena League (NAL). He joined the Liberty with just two weeks remaining in the regular season and the team holding a 6–3 record. Just two days after signing, he started the Week 11 game against the Sioux City Bandits, completing nine of 16 passes for 98 yards, three touchdowns, and two interceptions. He also rushed for 36 yards and three touchdowns, accounting for six total touchdowns in a 39–11 victory. Adams and the Liberty then lost their regular-season finale to the Colorado Spartans. In the quarterfinals, a rematch against the Spartans, Adams completed nine of 10 passes for 70 yards and three touchdowns while adding a rushing touchdown in a 50–48 victory. In the semifinal against the Pueblo Punishers, he completed nine of 12 passes for 63 yards, three touchdowns, and one interception while rushing for a team-high 71 yards and another touchdown in a 43–41 win. On the final play of the game, Adams threw the game-winning touchdown pass to Ed Smith to send the Liberty to the NAL championship game. In the championship game against the Southwest Kansas Storm, Adams completed 11 of 15 passes for 107 yards and two touchdowns while adding 50 rushing yards and a rushing touchdown as the Liberty fell 42–38.

=== BC Lions ===
On July 20, 2026, Adams was signed by the BC Lions, following an injury to starting quarterback Nathan Rourke. On August 4, Adams was assigned to the Lions' practice roster. He dressed in two games as the third string quarterback and was later released on August 19.

== Career statistics ==
=== CFL ===
Year	Team	Games			Passing								Rushing			
Year	Team	GD	GS	Record	Cmp	Att	Pct	Yds	Y/A	TD	Int	Rtg	Att	Yds	Avg	TD
2022	OTT	6	0	—	8	12	66.7	98	8.2	0	0	91.7	4	31	7.8	0
2023	OTT	3	1	1–0	23	37	62.2	314	8.5	1	1	87.0	7	50	7.1	0
2024	OTT	6	0	—	DNP											
2025	OTT	8	2	0–2	36	58	62.1	405	7.0	4	5	70.0	10	35	3.5	0
2026	BC	2	0	—	DNP											
Career		25	3	1–2	67	107	62.1	817	7.6	5	6	78.3	21	116	5.5	0

=== Indoor ===
Year	Team	League	Games			Passing								Rushing			
Year	Team	League	GP	GS	Record	Cmp	Att	Pct	Yds	Y/A	TD	Int	Rtg	Att	Yds	Avg	TD
2021	Salina	CIF	9	8	7–1	83	117	70.9	944	8.1	25	3	204.1	42	145	3.5	6
2022	Salina	CIF	3	3	2–1	37	63	58.7	349	5.5	5	1	128.3	20	118	5.9	4
2026	Salina	NAL	5	5	3–2	50	72	69.4	431	6.0	13	5	165.4	40	197	4.9	6
Career			17	16	12–4	170	252	67.4	1,724	6.8	43	9	174.1	102	460	4.5	16

Sources: 2021, 2022, 2026. Postseason totals are included for the 2021 Champions Indoor Football (CIF) season and 2026 National Arena League (NAL) season. Non-conference statistics are not included. In 2021, Adams appeared in the non-conference game against the Arlington Longhorns, completing 2 of 4 passes for 22 yards and rushing three times for 21 yards after relieving Mitch Kidd. In 2022, Adams started the non-conference game against the Queen City Asylum, completing 9 of 10 passes for 118 yards and three touchdowns while adding one rushing attempt for 10 yards.

=== College ===
Year	Team	Games			Passing								Rushing			
Year	Team	GP	GS	Record	Cmp	Att	Pct	Yds	Y/A	TD	Int	Rtg	Att	Yds	Avg	TD
2015	Western Carolina	0	0	—	Redshirted (redshirt)											
2016	Western Carolina	11	10	2–8	217	342	63.5	2,568	7.5	15	9	135.7	123	358	2.9	1
2017	Western Carolina	12	12	7–5	189	305	62.0	2,294	7.5	22	8	143.7	155	746	4.8	2
2018	Western Carolina	11	11	3–8	188	300	62.7	2,417	8.1	16	6	143.9	194	1,016	5.2	10
2019	Western Carolina	10	9	2–7	145	225	64.4	1,699	7.6	11	9	136.0	122	437	3.6	5
Career		44	42	14−28	739	1,172	63.1	8,978	7.7	64	32	140.0	594	2,557	4.3	18

== Coaching career ==
In 2021, Adams joined Dodge City Community College football staff as a running backs coach.

== Personal life ==
Adams was born to parents Nikki and Andrico Adams. He has an older sister, Ciara, and a younger brother, Anquan.
