= 2019 NCAA Division I FCS football rankings =

- Season: 2019
- Postseason: Single-elimination
- Preseason No. 1: North Dakota State
- National champions: North Dakota State
- Conference with most teams in final poll: Big Sky, MVFC (4)

The 2019 National Collegiate Athletic Association (NCAA) Division I Football Championship Subdivision (FCS) football rankings consists of two human polls, in addition to various publications' preseason polls. Unlike the Football Bowl Subdivision (FBS), college football's governing body, the NCAA, bestows the national championship title through a 24-team tournament. The following weekly polls determine the top 25 teams at the NCAA Division I Football Championship Subdivision level of college football for the 2019 season. The STATS Poll is voted by media members while the Coaches Poll is determined by coaches at the FCS level.

The STATS preseason poll was released on August 5, 2019, with defending champions North Dakota State earning 142 of the 160 allotted first-place votes, while James Madison earned fourteen, defending runners-up Eastern Washington earned three, and South Dakota State earned one.

== Legend ==
Legend
	Increase in ranking
	Decrease in ranking
	Not ranked previous week
	Selected for NCAA FCS Playoffs
Italics	Number of first place votes
(#–#)	Win–loss record
т	Tied with team above or below also with this symbol

== STATS Poll ==
	Preseason August 5	Week 1 September 2	Week 2 September 9	Week 3 September 16	Week 4 September 23	Week 5 September 30	Week 6 October 7	Week 7 October 14	Week 8 October 21	Week 9 October 28	Week 10 November 4	Week 11 November 11	Week 12 November 18	Week 13 November 24	Week 14 (Final) January 13	
1.	North Dakota State 142	North Dakota State 148 (1–0)	North Dakota State 149 (2–0)	North Dakota State 150 (3–0)	North Dakota State 153 (4–0)	North Dakota State 152 (4–0)	North Dakota State 155 (5–0)	North Dakota State 155 (6–0)	North Dakota State 156 (7–0)	North Dakota State 154 (8–0)	North Dakota State 155 (9–0)	North Dakota State 153 (10–0)	North Dakota State 156 (11–0)	North Dakota State 152 (12–0)	North Dakota State 153 (16–0)	1.
2.	James Madison 14	James Madison 11 (0–1)	James Madison 9 (1–1)	James Madison 8 (2–1)	James Madison 4 (3–1)	James Madison 7 (4–1)	James Madison 1 (5–1)	James Madison 2 (6–1)	James Madison 3 (7–1)	James Madison 1 (8–1)	James Madison 1 (8–1)	James Madison (9–1)	James Madison (10–1)	James Madison (11–1)	James Madison (14–2)	2.
3.	South Dakota State 1	South Dakota State (0–1)	South Dakota State (1–1)	South Dakota State (2–1)	South Dakota State (3–1)	South Dakota State (3–1)	South Dakota State (4–1)	South Dakota State (5–1)	South Dakota State (6–1)	Weber State (6–2)	Weber State (7–2)	Weber State (8–2)	Montana (9–2)	Sacramento State (9–3)	Weber State (11–4)	3.
4.	Eastern Washington 3	Eastern Washington 1 (0–1)	Eastern Washington (1–1)	UC Davis (2–1)	UC Davis (2–2)	Weber State (2–2)	Weber State (3–2)	Weber State (4–2)	Weber State (5–2)	South Dakota State (6–2)	South Dakota State (7–2)	Northern Iowa (7–3)	Sacramento State (8–3)	Weber State (9–3)	Montana State (11–4)	4.
5.	UC Davis	UC Davis (0–1)	UC Davis (1–1)	Towson (3–0)	Weber State (1–2)	Villanova (5–0)	Villanova (6–0)	Montana (5–1)	Villanova (6–1)	Kennesaw State (7–1)	Northern Iowa (6–3)	Montana (8–2)	South Dakota State (8–3)	Montana State (9–3)	Northern Iowa (10–5)	5.
6.	Jacksonville State	Maine (1–0)	Weber State (1–1)	Weber State (1–2)	Kennesaw State (3–1)	Montana State (4–1)	Montana State (5–1)	Kennesaw State (5–1)	Kennesaw State (6–1)	Sacramento State (6–2)	Montana (7–2)	Sacramento State (7–3)	Weber State (8–3)	Northern Iowa (8–4)	Montana (10–4)	6.
7.	Maine	Weber State (0–1)	Maine (1–1)	Kennesaw State (2–1)	Montana State (3–1)	Kennesaw State (4–1)	Kennesaw State (4–1)	Villanova (6–1)	Sacramento State (5–2)	Illinois State (6–2)	Central Arkansas (7–2)	Illinois State (7–3)	Illinois State (8–3)	Montana (9–3)	Illinois State (10–5)	7.
8.	Weber State	Towson (1–0)	Towson (2–0)	Montana State (2–1)	Villanova (4–0)	Montana (4–1)	Montana (5–1)	Furman (4–2)	Illinois State (5–2)	Montana (6–2)	Sacramento State (6–3)	South Dakota State (7–3)	Montana State (8–3)	Villanova (9–3)	Austin Peay (11–4)	8.
9.	Wofford	Kennesaw State (1–0)	Kennesaw State (1–1)	Northern Iowa (1–1)	Northern Iowa (2–1)	Towson (3–2)	Towson (3–2)	Nicholls (4–2)	Montana State (5–2)	Northern Iowa (5–3)	Furman (6–3)	Furman (7–3)	Northern Iowa (7–4)	Central Arkansas (9–3)	Sacramento State (9–4)	9.
10.	Kennesaw State	Nicholls (0–1)	Montana State (1–1)	Jacksonville State (2–1)	Towson (3–1)	Illinois State (3–1)	Northern Iowa (3–2)	North Carolina A&T (4–1)	Montana (5–2)	Central Arkansas (6–2)	Princeton (7–0)	Montana State (7–3)	Villanova (8–3)	South Dakota State (8–4)	South Dakota State (8–5)	10.
11.	Towson	Northern Iowa (0–1)	Northern Iowa (1–1)	Eastern Washington (1–2)	Jacksonville State (3–1)	Central Arkansas (3–1)	Furman (4–2)	Illinois State (4–2)	Northern Iowa (4–3)	Villanova (6–2)	Illinois State (6–3)	Dartmouth (8–0)	Central Arkansas (8–3)	Wofford (8–3)	Central Arkansas (9–4)	11.
12.	Nicholls	Southeast Missouri State (1–0)	Nicholls (0–1)	Maine (1–2)	Nicholls (2–1) т	UC Davis (2–3)	Nicholls (3–2)	Montana State (5–2)	Central Arkansas (5–2)	Princeton (6–0)	Montana State (6–3)	Florida A&M (8–1)	Florida A&M (9–1)	Southeast Missouri State (9–3)	Monmouth (11–3)	12.
13.	Colgate	Montana State (0–1)	Illinois State (1–1)	Nicholls (1–1)	Maine (2–2) т	Northern Iowa (2–2)	North Carolina A&T (4–1)	Central Arkansas (4–2)	Princeton (5–0)	Furman (5–3)	Dartmouth (7–0)	Villanova (7–3)	Southeast Missouri State (8–3)	Illinois State (8–4)	Kennesaw State (11–3)	13.
14.	Montana State	Indiana State (0–1)	Central Arkansas (2–0)	Central Arkansas (3–0)	Illinois State (3–1)	Furman (3–2)	Illinois State (3–2)	Northern Iowa (3–3)	Furman (4–3)	Montana State (5–3)	North Carolina A&T (6–2)	Central Arkansas (7–3)	Wofford (7–3)	Monmouth (10–2)	Nicholls (9–5)	14.
15.	Illinois State	North Carolina A&T (1–0)	North Carolina A&T (1–1)	Illinois State (2–1)	Central Arkansas (3–1)	North Carolina A&T (3–1)	Delaware (3–2)	Sacramento State (4–2)	Nicholls (4–3)	Dartmouth (6–0)	Kennesaw State (7–2)	Southeast Missouri State (7–3)	Monmouth (9–2)	Kennesaw State (10–2)	Villanova (9–4)	15.
16.	Indiana State	Illinois State (0–1)	Furman (1–1)	North Carolina A&T (2–1)	Furman (2–2)	Nicholls (2–2)	Central Arkansas (3–2)	Jacksonville State (5–2)	Towson (4–3)	North Carolina A&T (5–2)	Florida A&M (8–1)	Kennesaw State (8–2)	Kennesaw State (9–2)	Furman (8–4)	Wofford (8–4)	16.
17.	Southeast Missouri State	Furman (1–0)	Jacksonville State (1–1)	Furman (1–2)	North Carolina A&T (2–1)	Southeastern Louisiana (3–1)	Jacksonville State (4–2)	Princeton (4–0)	Dartmouth (5–0)	Florida A&M (7–1)	Southeast Missouri State (6–3)	Monmouth (8–2)	Furman (7–4)	Central Connecticut (11–1)	Southeast Missouri State (9–4)	17.
18.	Northern Iowa	Jacksonville State (0–1)	Delaware (2–0)	Villanova (3–0)	Montana (3–1)	Youngstown State (4–0)	Maine (2–3)	Towson (3–3)	North Carolina A&T (4–2)	Southeast Missouri State (5–3)	Villanova (6–3)	Princeton (7–1)	Central Connecticut (10–1)	Austin Peay (9–3)	Albany (9–5)	18.
19.	Furman	Wofford (0–1)	Southeast Missouri State (1–1)	Montana (2–1)	Southeastern Louisiana (2–1)	Delaware (3–2)	Youngstown State (4–1)	Youngstown State (4–2)	Delaware (4–3)	Central Connecticut (7–1)	Monmouth (7–2)	Central Connecticut (9–1)	Towson (7–4)	Nicholls (8–4)	Southeastern Louisiana (8–5)	19.
20.	North Carolina A&T	Central Arkansas (1–0)	Montana (2–0)	Delaware (2–1)	Delaware (3–1)	Maine (2–3)	Southeast Missouri State (3–2)	Austin Peay (4–2)	Florida A&M (6–1)	Stony Brook (5–3)	Central Connecticut (8–1)	Towson (6–4)	Austin Peay (8–3)	Florida A&M (9–2)	North Carolina A&T (9–3)	20.
21.	Elon	Delaware (1–0)	Wofford (0–1)	Southeastern Louisiana (1–1)	Eastern Washington (1–3)	Jacksonville State (3–2)	Princeton (3–0)	Dartmouth (4–0)	Sam Houston State (5–3)	Towson (4–4)	Towson (5–4)	Wofford (6–3)	Southeastern Louisiana (7–3)	Dartmouth (9–1)	Furman (8–5)	21.
22.	Delaware	Montana (1–0)	Villanova (2–0)	Elon (2–1)	Youngstown State (3–0)	Eastern Washington (2–3)	Stony Brook (4–2)	New Hampshire (4–2)	UC Davis (4–4)	Jacksonville State (6–3)	North Dakota (5–3)	Austin Peay (7–3)	Dartmouth (8–1)	Yale (9–1)	Dartmouth (9–1)	22.
23.	Sam Houston State	Southeastern Louisiana (1–0)	Southeastern Louisiana (1–0)	Southeast Missouri State (1–2)	Southeast Missouri State (2–2)	Southeast Missouri State (2–2)	Southeastern Louisiana (3–2)	UC Davis (3–4)	Central Connecticut (6–1)	Wofford (5–2)	New Hampshire (5–3)	Southeastern Louisiana (6–3)	Nicholls (7–4)	North Carolina A&T (8–3)	Central Connecticut (11–2)	23.
24.	Princeton	Villanova (1–0)	Sam Houston State (1–1)	Youngstown State (3–0)	Elon (2–2)	Stony Brook (4–1)	UC Davis (2–4)	Delaware (3–3)	Southeast Missouri State (4–3)	North Dakota (5–3)	Wofford (5–3)	Nicholls (6–4)	Yale (8–1)	North Dakota (7–4)	Florida A&M (9–2)	24.
25.	Montana	Sam Houston State (0–1)	Elon (1–1)	The Citadel (1–2)	The Citadel (2–2)	Princeton (2–0)	Sam Houston State (4–2)	Central Connecticut (5–1)	Jacksonville State (5–3)	Nicholls (4–4)	Nicholls (5–4)	North Carolina A&T (6–3)	North Carolina A&T (7–3)	Albany (8–4)	Yale (9–1)	25.
	Preseason August 5	Week 1 September 2	Week 2 September 9	Week 3 September 16	Week 4 September 23	Week 5 September 30	Week 6 October 7	Week 7 October 14	Week 8 October 21	Week 9 October 28	Week 10 November 4	Week 11 November 11	Week 12 November 18	Week 13 November 24	Week 14 (Final) January 13	
		Dropped: No. 13 Colgate; No. 21 Elon; No. 24 Princeton	Dropped: No. 14 Indiana State	Dropped: No. 21 Wofford; No. 24 Sam Houston State	None	Dropped: 24. Elon; 25. The Citadel	Dropped: 22. Eastern Washington	Dropped: 18. Maine; 20. Southeast Missouri State; 22. Stony Brook; 23. Southeastern Louisiana; 25. Sam Houston State	Dropped: 19. Youngstown State; 20. Austin Peay; 22. New Hampshire	Dropped: 19. Delaware; 21. Sam Houston State; 22. UC Davis	Dropped: 20. Stony Brook; 22. Jacksonville State	Dropped: 22. North Dakota; 23. New Hampshire	Dropped: 18. Princeton	Dropped: 19. Towson; 21. Southeastern Louisiana	Dropped: 24. North Dakota	

== Coaches Poll ==
	Preseason August 19	Week 1 September 2	Week 2 September 9	Week 3 September 16	Week 4 September 23	Week 5 September 30	Week 6 October 7	Week 7 October 14	Week 8 October 21	Week 9 October 28	Week 10 November 4	Week 11 November 11	Week 12 November 18	Week 13 November 25	Week 14 (Final) January 13	
1.	North Dakota State 23	North Dakota State 25 (1–0)	North Dakota State 26 (2–0)	North Dakota State 26 (3–0)	North Dakota State 26 (4–0)	North Dakota State 26 (4–0)	North Dakota State 26 (5–0)	North Dakota State 26 (6–0)	North Dakota State 26 (7–0)	North Dakota State 26 (8–0)	North Dakota State 26 (9–0)	North Dakota State 26 (10–0)	North Dakota State 26 (11–0)	North Dakota State 26 (12–0)	North Dakota State 25 (16–0)	1.
2.	James Madison 1	James Madison 1 (0–1)	James Madison (1–1)	James Madison (2–1)	James Madison (3–1)	James Madison (4–1)	James Madison (5–1)	James Madison (6–1)	James Madison (7–1)	James Madison (8–1)	James Madison (8–1)	James Madison (9–1)	James Madison (10–1)	James Madison (11–1)	James Madison (14–2)	2.
3.	Eastern Washington 2	South Dakota State (0–1)	South Dakota State (1–1)	South Dakota State (2–1)	South Dakota State (3–1)	South Dakota State (3–1)	South Dakota State (4–1)	South Dakota State (5–1)	South Dakota State (6–1)	Weber State (6–2)	Weber State (7–2)	Weber State (8–2)	Montana (9–2)	Sacramento State (9–3)	Weber State (11–4)	3.
4.	South Dakota State	UC Davis (0–1)	UC Davis (1–1)	UC Davis (2–1)	Kennesaw State (3–1)	Kennesaw State (4–1)	Kennesaw State (4–1)	Kennesaw State (5–1)	Kennesaw State (6–1)	Kennesaw State (7–1)	South Dakota State (7–2)	Montana (8–2)	Sacramento State (8–3)	Weber State (9–3)	Montana State (11–4)	4.
5.	UC Davis	Eastern Washington (0–1)	Eastern Washington (1–1)	Towson (3–0)	UC Davis (2–2)	Weber State (2–2)	Weber State (3–2)	Weber State (4–2)	Weber State (5–2)	South Dakota State (6–2)	Montana (7–2)	Northern Iowa (7–3)	South Dakota State (8–3)	Montana State (9–3)	Northern Iowa (10–5)	5.
6.	Jacksonville State	Maine (1–0)	Weber State (1–1)	Kennesaw State (2–1)	Weber State (1–2)	Illinois State (3–1)	Montana State (5–1)	Montana (5–1)	Villanova (6–1)	Sacramento State (6–2)	Central Arkansas (7–2)	Sacramento State (7–3)	Illinois State (8–3)	Northern Iowa (8–4)	Montana (10–4)	6.
7.	Maine	Kennesaw State (1–0)	Kennesaw State (1–1)	Weber State (1–2)	Northern Iowa (2–1)	Montana State (4–1)	Villanova (6–0)	Villanova (6–1)	Illinois State (5–2)	Illinois State (6–2)	Northern Iowa (6–3)	Furman (7–3)	Weber State (8–3)	Central Arkansas (9–3)	Illinois State (10–5)	7.
8.	Wofford	Weber State (0–1)	Towson (2–0)	Northern Iowa (1–1)	Illinois State (3–1)	Villanova (5–0)	Montana (5–1)	Furman (4–2)	Sacramento State (5–2)	Montana (6–2)	Sacramento State (6–3)	Illinois State (7–3)	Montana State (8–3)	Montana (9–3)	Kennesaw State (11–3)	8.
9.	Weber State	Towson (1–0)	Maine (1–1)	Nicholls (1–1)	Nicholls (2–1)	Montana (4–1)	Towson (3–2)	Nicholls (4–2)	Montana State (5–2)	Central Arkansas (6–2)	Princeton (7–0)	South Dakota State (7–3)	Kennesaw State (9–2)	Kennesaw State (10–2)	Sacramento State (9–4)	9.
10.	Kennesaw State	Nicholls (0–1)	Northern Iowa (1–1)	Illinois State (2–1)	Towson (3–1)	Central Arkansas (2–2) т	Northern Iowa (3–2)	Illinois State (4–2)	Central Arkansas (5–2)	Northern Iowa (5–3)	Furman (6–3)	Montana State (7–3)	Northern Iowa (7–4)	Villanova (9–3)	Austin Peay (11–4)	10.
11.	Nicholls	Furman (1–0)	Nicholls (0–1)	Eastern Washington (1–2)	Montana State (3–1)	Towson (3–2) т	Furman (4–2)	North Carolina A&T (4–1)	Montana (5–2)	Villanova (6–2)	Kennesaw State (7–2)	Kennesaw State (8–2)	Central Arkansas (8–3)	Monmouth (10–2)	Central Arkansas (9–4)	11.
12.	Towson	Northern Iowa (0–1)	Illinois State (1–1)	Central Arkansas (3–0)	Jacksonville State (3–1)	UC Davis (2–3)	Nicholls (3–2)	Montana State (5–2)	Northern Iowa (4–3)	Princeton (6–0)	Illinois State (6–3)	Dartmouth (8–0)	Monmouth (9–2)	South Dakota State (8–4)	South Dakota State (8–5)	12.
13.	Illinois State	Southeast Missouri State (1–0)	Furman (1–1)	Jacksonville State (2–1)	Villanova (4–0)	Northern Iowa (2–2)	Illinois State (3–2)	Central Arkansas (4–2)	Princeton (5–0)	Furman (5–3)	Dartmouth (7–0)	Central Arkansas (7–3)	Florida A&M (9–1)	Southeast Missouri State (9–3)	Monmouth (11–3)	13.
14.	Colgate	North Carolina A&T (1–0)	Central Arkansas (2–0)	Montana State (2–1)	Central Arkansas (3–1)	Furman (3–2)	North Carolina A&T (4–1)	Jacksonville State (5–2)	Furman (4–3)	Dartmouth (6–0)	Montana State (6–3)	Florida A&M (8–1)	Villanova (8–3)	Illinois State (8–4)	Nicholls (9–5)	14.
15.	Montana State	Indiana State (0–1)	Montana State (1–1)	Furman (1–2)	Furman (2–2)	Nicholls (2–2)	Delaware (3–2)	Northern Iowa (3–3)	Nicholls (4–3)	Montana State (5–3)	Florida A&M (8–1) т	Monmouth (8–2)	Furman (7–4)	Wofford (8–3)	Villanova (9–4)	15.
16.	Indiana State	Illinois State (0–1)	Jacksonville State (1–1)	Maine (1–2)	Maine (2–2)	North Carolina A&T (3–1)	Central Arkansas (2–3)	Princeton (4–0)	Dartmouth (5–0)	North Carolina A&T (5–2)	North Carolina A&T (6–2) т	Villanova (7–3)	Southeast Missouri State (8–3)	Furman (8–4)	Southeast Missouri State (9–4)	16.
17.	Furman	Jacksonville State (0–1)	North Carolina A&T (1–1)	North Carolina A&T (2–1)	Montana (3–1)	Youngstown State (4–0)	Youngstown State (4–1)	Sacramento State (4–2)	Towson (4–3)	Florida A&M (7–1)	Central Connecticut (8–1)	Southeast Missouri State (7–3)	Wofford (7–3)	Austin Peay (9–3)	Wofford (8–4)	17.
18.	Southeast Missouri State	Central Arkansas (1–0)	Delaware (2–0) т	Villanova (3–0)	North Carolina A&T (2–1)	Delaware (3–2)	Jacksonville State (4–2)	Youngstown State (4–2)	North Carolina A&T (4–2)	Jacksonville State (6–3)	Southeast Missouri State (6–3)	Central Connecticut (9–1)	Central Connecticut (10–1)	Central Connecticut (11–1)	Southeastern Louisiana (8–5)	18.
19.	North Carolina A&T	Montana State (0–1)	Montana (2–0) т	Montana (2–1)	Delaware (3–1)	Southeastern Louisiana (3–1)	Princeton (3–0)	Austin Peay (4–2)	Delaware (4–3)	Central Connecticut (7–1)	Villanova (6–3)	Princeton (7–1)	Austin Peay (8–3)	Nicholls (8–4)	Furman (8–5)	19.
20.	Northern Iowa	Wofford (0–1)	Southeast Missouri State (1–1)	Delaware (2–1)	Youngstown State (3–0)	Jacksonville State (3–2)	Maine (2–3)	Towson (3–3)	Incarnate Word (5–2)	Wofford (5–2)	Monmouth (7–2)	Wofford (6–3)	Towson (7–4)	Dartmouth (9–1)	Albany (9–5)	20.
21.	Elon	Delaware (1–0)	Sam Houston State (1–1)	Youngstown State (3–0)	Eastern Washington (1–3)	Eastern Washington (2–3)	UC Davis (2–4)	Dartmouth (4–0)	Jacksonville State (5–3)	Southeast Missouri State (5–3)	Towson (5–4)	Towson (6–4)	Dartmouth (8–1)	Florida A&M (9–2)	Dartmouth (9–1)	21.
22.	Sam Houston State	Sam Houston State (0–1)	Wofford (0–1)	Elon (2–1)	Southeastern Louisiana (2–1)	Maine (2–3)	Southeast Missouri State (3–2)	UC Davis (3–4)	UC Davis (4–4)	Towson (4–4)	North Dakota (5–3)	Austin Peay (7–3)	Southeastern Louisiana (7–3)	North Carolina A&T (8–3)	Central Connecticut (11–2)	22.
23.	Delaware	Montana (1–0)	Villanova (2–0)	Southeastern Louisiana (1–1)	Princeton (1–0)	Princeton (2–0)	Stony Brook (4–2)	New Hampshire (4–2)	Florida A&M (6–1)	North Dakota (5–3)	Wofford (5–3)	Southeastern Louisiana (6–3)	Nicholls (7–4)	Yale (9–1)	North Carolina A&T (9–3)	23.
24.	Princeton	Colgate (0–2)	Southeastern Louisiana (1–0)	Princeton (0–0)	Elon (2–2)	Stony Brook (4–1)	Sam Houston State (4–2)	Delaware (3–3)	Central Connecticut (6–1)	Nicholls (4–4)	Austin Peay (6–3)	Nicholls (6–4)	North Carolina A&T (7–3)	Southeastern Louisiana (7–4)	Yale (9–1)	24.
25.	Central Arkansas	Princeton (0–0)	Princeton (0–0)	Southeast Missouri State (1–2)	North Dakota (2–1)	Houston Baptist (4–1) т Southeast Missouri State (2–2) т	Southeastern Louisiana (3–2)	Incarnate Word (4–2)	Sam Houston State (5–3)	Austin Peay (5–3)	New Hampshire (5–3)	North Carolina A&T (6–3)	Southern Illinois (7–4) т Yale (8–1) т	Southern Illinois (7–5)	Florida A&M (9–2)	25.
	Preseason August 19	Week 1 September 2	Week 2 September 9	Week 3 September 16	Week 4 September 23	Week 5 September 30	Week 6 October 7	Week 7 October 14	Week 8 October 21	Week 9 October 28	Week 10 November 4	Week 11 November 11	Week 12 November 18	Week 13 November 25	Week 14 (Final) January 13	
		Dropped: No. 21 Elon	Dropped: No. 15 Indiana State; No. 24 Colgate	Dropped: No. 21 Sam Houston State; No. 22 Wofford	Dropped: No. 25 Southeast Missouri State	Dropped: 24. Elon; 25. North Dakota	Dropped: 21. Eastern Washington; 25. Houston Baptist	Dropped: 20. Maine; 22. Southeast Missouri State; 23. Stony Brook; 24. Sam Houston State; 25. Southeastern Louisiana	Dropped: 18. Youngstown State; 19. Austin Peay; 23. New Hampshire	Dropped: 19. Delaware; 20. Incarnate Word; 22. UC Davis; 25. Sam Houston State	Dropped: 18. Jacksonville State; 24. Nicholls	Dropped: 22. North Dakota; 25. New Hampshire	Dropped: 19. Princeton	Dropped: 20. Towson	Dropped: 25. Southern Illinois	
