= Austin Peay Governors football =

Football team for Austin Peay State University

2026 Austin Peay Governors football team
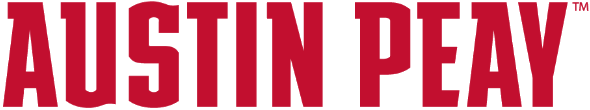
- First season: 1930; 96 years ago
- Head coach: Jeff Faris; 3rd season, 11–13 (.458)
- Location: Clarksville, Tennessee
- Stadium: Fortera Stadium (capacity: 10,000)
- NCAA division: Division I FCS
- Conference: UAC
- Colors: Red and white
- All-time record: 334–572–16 (.371)

Conference championships
- VSAC: 1948 OVC: 1977, 2019 ASUN: 2022 UAC: 2023
- Website: letsgopeay.com

The Austin Peay Governors football program is the college football team for Austin Peay State University (Peay or APSU), located in the U.S. state of Tennessee. The team competes in the NCAA Division I Football Championship Subdivision (FCS) as a member of the United Athletic Conference (UAC). In July 2026, the Western Athletic Conference (WAC) rebranded as the UAC, absorbing a football-only UAC that operated in the 2023–2025 seasons as an alliance between the WAC and Atlantic Sun Conference (ASUN). Peay was one of five ASUN members, all of which had played in the football-only UAC, to join the all-sports UAC.

Before joining the football-only UAC, Peay played the 2022 season in the ASUN. Before that time, Peay was previously a member of the Ohio Valley Conference (1963–1996, 2007–2021) and the Pioneer Football League (2001–2005). The school's first football team was fielded in 1930. Austin Peay Governors football plays its home games at the 10,000 seat Fortera Stadium.

== History ==
=== Classifications ===
- 1957–1972: NCAA College Division
- 1973–1977: NCAA Division II
- 1978–present: NCAA Division I–AA/FCS

=== Conference memberships ===
- 1930–1946: Independent
- 1947–1962: Volunteer State Athletic Conference
- 1963–1996: Ohio Valley Conference
- 1997–2000: NCAA Division I–AA Independent
- 2001–2005: Pioneer Football League
- 2006: NCAA Division I FCS Independent
- 2007–2021: Ohio Valley Conference
- 2022: ASUN Conference
- 2023–2025: United Athletic Conference (football-only)
- 2026–present: United Athletic Conference (all-sports)

Though not competing in OVC football from 1997 to 2006, Peay remained a full OVC member during this period.

=== Rivalries ===
==== Sgt. York Trophy ====
The trophy goes to the team in Tennessee that has the best record against the other three teams. Austin Peay has won the trophy three times, in 2017, 2018, and 2019.

==== Battle of the Border ====
The battle of the border is a trophy awarded to the team with the most points based on wins between all the sporting events between Austin Peay and Murray State. Murray State leads the series 36–16.

== Notable former players ==
Notable alumni include:

- Jeff Gooch
- Michael Swift
- Kirk Pointer
- Kyran Moore
- Bonnie Sloan, first deaf player in NFL history
- Percy Howard (whose only NFL TD catch came in Super Bowl X, as a member of the Dallas Cowboys)
- Lewis Lastik, featured actor in Remember the Titans, offensive lineman. (Also member of the APSU track and field teams, shot put, and javelin.)

== Retired numbers ==
Austin Peay Governors retired numbers
No.	Player	Pos.	Tenure	Ref.
30	John Ogles	RB	1963–1966	
84	Harold Roberts	WR	1967–1970	

=== Honored jerseys ===
Numbers honored, but not retired and available for any player:

Austin Peay Governors honored jerseys
No.	Player	Pos.	Tenure
3	Terrence Holt	RB	2007–2010
8	Chris Fletcher	RB	2004–2007
10	Carolton Flatt	QB	1963–1964
13	Kordell Jackson	RB	2017-2021
44	Jay Bailey	RB	2000–2002
46	Bob Bible	LB	1974–1978

== Conference championships ==
Austin Peay has won five conference championships, three outright, and two shared with Southeast Missouri State in the OVC, Central Arkansas and Eastern Kentucky in the ASUN

Year	Coach	Conference	Record	Conference record
1948	David B. Aaron	Volunteer State Athletic Conference	8–2	2–0
1977	Boots Donnelly	Ohio Valley Conference	8–3	6–1
2019	Mark Hudspeth	Ohio Valley Conference	11–4	7–1
2022	Scotty Walden	ASUN Conference	7–4	3–2
2023	Scotty Walden	United Athletic Conference	9–3	6–0

== Postseason ==
=== FCS playoffs ===
The Governors have made two appearances in the FCS Playoffs, their first being in 2019; their record is 2–2.

Year	Round	Opponent	Result
2019	First Round; Second Round; Quarterfinals	Furman; Sacramento State; Montana State	W 42–6; W 42–28; L 10–24
2023	First Round	Chattanooga	L 21–24
2026	First Round	#14 Illinois State	

== Future non-conference opponents ==
Future non-conference opponents announced as of August 7, 2026.

2026	2027	2028	2029	2030	2031	2032	2033	2034	2035	2036	2037
Gardner–Webb	Davidson	Butler	at Murray State	Murray State	at Tennessee	Murray State	at Murray State	Murray State	at Murray State	Murray State	at Murray State
at Vanderbilt	at Murray State	at Indiana	at Troy	at Marshall	at Murray State						
Morehead State	at Auburn	Murray State									
UT Martin	at UT Martin	at Samford									
New Haven											
