= 2019 Tennessee Tech Golden Eagles football team =

American college football season

2019 Tennessee Tech Golden Eagles football
- Conference: Ohio Valley Conference
- Record: 6–6 (3–5 OVC)
- Head coach: Dewayne Alexander (2nd season)
- Offensive coordinator: Tre Lamb (2nd season)
- Defensive coordinator: Donnie Suber (2nd season)
- Home stadium: Tucker Stadium

2019 Ohio Valley Conference football standings
| | Conf. | | | Overall |
| Team | W | | L | W | | L |
|---|---|---|---|---|---|---|
| No. 8 Austin Peay +^ | 7 | – | 1 | 9 | – | 3 |
| No. 17 Southeast Missouri State +^ | 7 | – | 1 | 9 | – | 3 |
| UT Martin | 6 | – | 2 | 7 | – | 5 |
| Eastern Kentucky | 5 | – | 3 | 7 | – | 5 |
| Tennessee Tech | 3 | – | 5 | 6 | – | 6 |
| Jacksonville State | 3 | – | 5 | 6 | – | 6 |
| Murray State | 2 | – | 6 | 4 | – | 8 |
| Tennessee State | 2 | – | 6 | 3 | – | 9 |
| Eastern Illinois | 1 | – | 7 | 1 | – | 11 |
+ – Conference co-champions; ^ – FCS playoff participant; Rankings from STATS Poll

The 2019 Tennessee Tech Golden Eagles football team represented Tennessee Technological University as a member of Ohio Valley Conference (OVC) during the 2019 NCAA Division I FCS football season. Led by second-year head coach Dewayne Alexander, the Golden Eagles compiled an overall record of 6–6 overall with a mark of 3–5 in conference play, tying for fifth place in the OVC. Tennessee Tech played home games at Tucker Stadium in Cookeville, Tennessee.

== Preseason ==
=== Preseason coaches' poll ===
The OVC released their preseason coaches' poll on July 22, 2019. The Golden Eagles were picked to finish in ninth place.

=== Preseason All-OVC team ===
The Golden Eagles did not have any players selected to the preseason all-OVC team.

== Schedule ==
| Date | Time | Opponent | Site | TV | Result | Attendance |
|---|---|---|---|---|---|---|
| August 31 | 6:00 p.m. | Samford* | Tucker Stadium; Cookeville, TN | ESPN+ | W 59–58 ^{2OT} | 7,806 |
| September 7 | 1:30 p.m. | at Miami (OH)* | Yager Stadium; Oxford, OH | ESPN+ | L 17–48 | 16,022 |
| September 14 | 6:00 p.m. | Virginia–Wise* | Tucker Stadium; Cookeville, TN | ESPN+ | W 31–14 | 10,436 |
| September 21 | 3:00 p.m. | at Western Illinois* | Hanson Field; Macomb, IL | ESPN3 | W 38–24 | 1,594 |
| September 28 | 4:00 p.m. | at Eastern Illinois | O'Brien Field; Charleston, IL | ESPN3 | W 40–29 | 7,055 |
| October 5 | 6:00 p.m. | at No. 23 Southeast Missouri State | Houck Stadium; Cape Girardeau, MO | ESPN+ | L 37–43 ^{2OT} | 4,373 |
| October 12 | 6:00 p.m. | UT Martin | Tucker Stadium; Cookeville, TN (Sgt. York Trophy) | ESPN+ | L 14–55 | 5,330 |
| October 26 | 1:30 p.m. | Austin Peay | Tucker Stadium; Cookeville, TN (Sgt. York Trophy) | ESPN+ | L 21–58 | 2,572 |
| November 2 | 1:00 p.m. | at Murray State | Roy Stewart Stadium; Murray, KY | ESPN+ | W 17–7 | 5,302 |
| November 9 | 1:30 p.m. | Jacksonville State^{†} | Tucker Stadium; Cookeville, TN | ESPN+ | W 37–27 | 11,331 |
| November 16 | 12:00 p.m. | at Eastern Kentucky | Roy Kidd Stadium; Richmond, KY | ESPN+ | L 10–22 | 2,987 |
| November 23 | 1:30 p.m. | Tennessee State | Tucker Stadium; Cookeville, TN (Sgt. York Trophy) | ESPN+ | L 27–37 | 2,728 |
*Non-conference game; ^{†}Homecoming; Rankings from STATS Poll released prior to the game; All times are in Central time

== Game summaries ==
=== Samford ===
| | 1 | 2 | 3 | 4 | OT | 2OT | Total |
|---|---|---|---|---|---|---|---|
| Bulldogs | 7 | 17 | 14 | 6 | 7 | 7 | 58 |
| Golden Eagles | 12 | 0 | 10 | 22 | 7 | 8 | 59 |

=== At Miami (OH) ===
| | 1 | 2 | 3 | 4 | Total |
|---|---|---|---|---|---|
| Golden Eagles | 3 | 0 | 0 | 14 | 17 |
| RedHawks | 10 | 31 | 0 | 7 | 48 |

=== Virginia–Wise ===
| | 1 | 2 | 3 | 4 | Total |
|---|---|---|---|---|---|
| Cavaliers | 7 | 0 | 7 | 0 | 14 |
| Golden Eagles | 7 | 21 | 0 | 3 | 31 |

=== At Western Illinois ===
| | 1 | 2 | 3 | 4 | Total |
|---|---|---|---|---|---|
| Golden Eagles | 7 | 7 | 10 | 14 | 38 |
| Leathernecks | 0 | 3 | 7 | 14 | 24 |

=== At Eastern Illinois ===
| | 1 | 2 | 3 | 4 | Total |
|---|---|---|---|---|---|
| Golden Eagles | 0 | 21 | 13 | 6 | 40 |
| Panthers | 7 | 0 | 7 | 15 | 29 |

=== At Southeast Missouri State ===
| | 1 | 2 | 3 | 4 | OT | 2OT | Total |
|---|---|---|---|---|---|---|---|
| Golden Eagles | 7 | 13 | 7 | 3 | 7 | 0 | 37 |
| No. 23 Redhawks | 6 | 14 | 3 | 7 | 7 | 6 | 43 |

=== UT Martin ===
| | 1 | 2 | 3 | 4 | Total |
|---|---|---|---|---|---|
| Skyhawks | 10 | 17 | 21 | 7 | 55 |
| Golden Eagles | 0 | 0 | 0 | 14 | 14 |

=== Austin Peay ===
| | 1 | 2 | 3 | 4 | Total |
|---|---|---|---|---|---|
| Governors | 20 | 24 | 7 | 7 | 58 |
| Golden Eagles | 7 | 7 | 0 | 7 | 21 |

=== At Murray State ===
| | 1 | 2 | 3 | 4 | Total |
|---|---|---|---|---|---|
| Golden Eagles | 3 | 7 | 7 | 0 | 17 |
| Racers | 7 | 0 | 0 | 0 | 7 |

=== Jacksonville State ===
| | 1 | 2 | 3 | 4 | Total |
|---|---|---|---|---|---|
| Gamecocks | 7 | 0 | 7 | 13 | 27 |
| Golden Eagles | 10 | 14 | 7 | 6 | 37 |

=== At Eastern Kentucky ===
| | 1 | 2 | 3 | 4 | Total |
|---|---|---|---|---|---|
| Golden Eagles | 7 | 0 | 3 | 0 | 10 |
| Colonels | 7 | 9 | 0 | 6 | 22 |

=== Tennessee State ===
| | 1 | 2 | 3 | 4 | Total |
|---|---|---|---|---|---|
| Tigers | 0 | 10 | 13 | 14 | 37 |
| Golden Eagles | 14 | 13 | 0 | 0 | 27 |
