= 2019 Hampton Pirates football team =

American college football season

2019 Hampton Pirates football
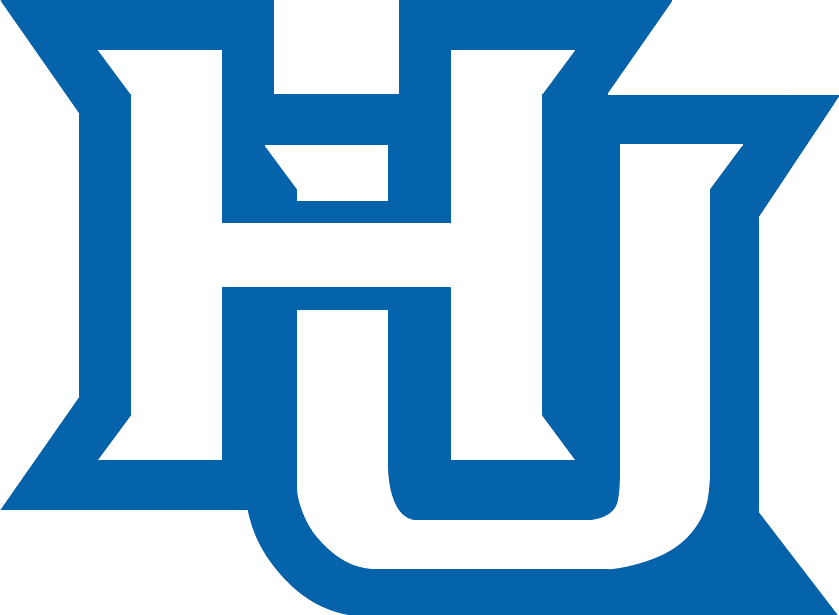
- Conference: Big South Conference
- Record: 5–7 (1–5 Big South)
- Head coach: Robert Prunty (2nd season)
- Home stadium: Armstrong Stadium

2019 Big South Conference football standings
	Conf.			Overall
Team	W		L	W		L
No. 12 Monmouth $^	6	–	0	11	–	3
No. 13 Kennesaw State ^	5	–	1	11	–	3
Charleston Southern	4	–	2	6	–	6
Campbell	3	–	3	6	–	5
Hampton	1	–	5	5	–	7
Gardner–Webb	1	–	5	3	–	9
Presbyterian	1	–	5	2	–	10
North Alabama *	0	–	0	4	–	7
$ – Conference champion; ^ – FCS playoff participant; * North Alabama ineligible for FCS postseason play due to transition to NCAA Division I; Rankings from STATS Poll

The 2019 Hampton Pirates football team represented Hampton University in the 2019 NCAA Division I FCS football season. They were led by second-year head coach Robert Prunty and played their home games at Armstrong Stadium. They were first-year members of the Big South Conference. They finished the season 5–7, 1–5 in Big South play to finish in a three-way tie for fifth place.

== Preseason ==
=== Big South poll ===
In the Big South preseason poll released on July 21, 2019, the Pirates were predicted to finish in sixth place.

=== Preseason All–Big South team ===
The Pirates had one player selected to the preseason all-Big South team.

Offense

Gibril Ghee – OL

=== Headlines ===
On August 2, 2019, it was announced that former Florida State quarterback Deondre Francois had completed a graduate transfer to Hampton and would be immediately eligible for the upcoming season.

== Schedule ==
Date	Time	Opponent	Site	TV	Result	Attendance
August 31	6:00 p.m.	Elizabeth City State*	Armstrong Stadium; Hampton, VA	ESPN+	W 65–7	8,234
September 7	6:00 p.m.	Virginia Union*	Armstrong Stadium; Hampton, VA	ESPN+	L 17–36	8,127
September 14	4:30 p.m.	vs. Howard*	Soldier Field; Chicago, IL (Battle of the Real HU)	NBC 5 Chicago	W 41–20	19,425
September 21	6:00 p.m.	at Liberty*	Williams Stadium; Lynchburg, VA	ESPN+	L 27–62	18,944
October 5	2:00 p.m.	North Alabama	Armstrong Stadium; Hampton, VA	ESPN+	W 40–34	4,213
October 12	1:30 p.m.	at Gardner–Webb	Spangler Stadium; Boiling Springs, NC	ESPN+	L 27–35	6,300
October 19	4:00 p.m.	at Campbell	Barker–Lane Stadium; Buies Creek, NC	ESPN+	L 16–31	6,783
October 26	2:00 p.m.	Virginia–Lynchburg*^{†}	Armstrong Stadium; Hampton, VA	ESPN+	W 56–6	15,000
November 2	1:00 p.m.	Presbyterian	Armstrong Stadium; Hampton, VA	ESPN+	W 40–17	4,123
November 9	6:00 p.m.	at Charleston Southern	Buccaneer Field; North Charleston, SC	ESPN3	L 20–27 ^{OT}	2,476
November 16	1:00 p.m.	No. 16 Kennesaw State	Armstrong Stadium; Hampton, VA	ESPN+	L 7–50	3,612
November 23	12:00 p.m.	at No. 15 Monmouth	Kessler Field; West Long Branch, NJ	ESPN+	L 13–48	2,331
*Non-conference game; ^{†}Homecoming; Rankings from STATS Poll released prior to the game; All times are in Eastern time

== Game summaries ==
=== Elizabeth City State ===
	1	2	3	4	Total
Vikings	0	0	7	0	7
Pirates	20	24	14	7	65

=== Virginia Union ===
	1	2	3	4	Total
Panthers	14	0	9	13	36
Pirates	0	17	0	0	17

=== Vs. Howard ===
	1	2	3	4	Total
Bison	3	10	0	7	20
Pirates	0	20	14	7	41

=== At Liberty ===
	1	2	3	4	Total
Pirates	12	0	8	7	27
Flames	27	14	7	14	62

=== North Alabama ===
	1	2	3	4	Total
Lions	2	0	13	19	34
Pirates	6	14	3	17	40

=== At Gardner–Webb ===
	1	2	3	4	Total
Pirates	3	21	0	3	27
Runnin' Bulldogs	14	7	7	7	35

=== At Campbell ===
	1	2	3	4	Total
Pirates	3	7	0	6	16
Fighting Camels	7	10	0	14	31

=== Virginia–Lynchburg ===
	1	2	3	4	Total
Dragons	0	6	0	0	6
Pirates	17	18	14	7	56

=== Presbyterian ===
	1	2	3	4	Total
Blue Hose	3	0	14	0	17
Pirates	6	14	7	13	40

=== At Charleston Southern ===
	1	2	3	4	OT	Total
Pirates	13	0	0	7	0	20
Buccaneers	3	7	7	3	7	27

=== Kennesaw State ===
	1	2	3	4	Total
No. 16 Owls	21	10	12	7	50
Pirates	0	0	7	0	7

=== At Monmouth ===
	1	2	3	4	Total
Pirates	7	6	0	0	13
No. 15 Hawks	14	17	14	3	48
