= 2019 North Alabama Lions football team =

American college football season

2019 North Alabama Lions football
- Conference: Big South Conference
- Record: 4–7 (0–0 Big South)
- Head coach: Chris Willis (3rd season)
- Offensive coordinator: Ryan Aplin (2nd season)
- Defensive coordinator: Steadman Campbell (2nd season)
- Home stadium: Braly Municipal Stadium

2019 Big South Conference football standings
	Conf.			Overall
Team	W		L	W		L
No. 12 Monmouth $^	6	–	0	11	–	3
No. 13 Kennesaw State ^	5	–	1	11	–	3
Charleston Southern	4	–	2	6	–	6
Campbell	3	–	3	6	–	5
Hampton	1	–	5	5	–	7
Gardner–Webb	1	–	5	3	–	9
Presbyterian	1	–	5	2	–	10
North Alabama *	0	–	0	4	–	7
$ – Conference champion; ^ – FCS playoff participant; * North Alabama ineligible for FCS postseason play due to transition to NCAA Division I; Rankings from STATS Poll

The 2019 North Alabama Lions football team represented the University of North Alabama as a first-year member of the Big South Conference during the 2019 NCAA Division I FCS football season. Led by third-year head coach Chris Willis, the Lions compiled an overall record of 4–7 with a mark of 3–4 against Big South opponents. However, due to North Alabama's transition from NCAA Division II to NCAA Division I Football Championship Subdivision (FCS) competition, the team's official conference record was 0–0. The Lions played home games at Braly Municipal Stadium in Florence, Alabama.

== Schedule ==
Date	Time	Opponent	Site	TV	Result	Attendance
August 29	7:00 p.m.	Western Illinois*	Braly Municipal Stadium; Florence, AL	ESPN+	W 26–17	10,576
September 7	8:00 p.m.	at No. 22 Montana*	Washington–Grizzly Stadium; Missoula, MT	Pluto TV	L 17–61	24,023
September 14	6:00 p.m.	Alabama A&M*	Braly Municipal Stadium; Florence, AL	ESPN+	L 24–31	12,767
September 21	6:00 p.m.	at No. 10 Jacksonville State*	JSU Stadium; Jacksonville, AL	ESPN+	L 12–30	21,976
September 28	3:00 p.m.	Presbyterian^{†}	Braly Municipal Stadium; Florence, AL	ESPN+	W 41–21	8,573
October 5	1:00 p.m.	at Hampton	Armstrong Stadium; Hampton, VA	ESPN+	L 34–40	4,213
October 19	6:00 p.m.	Charleston Southern	Braly Municipal Stadium; Florence, AL	ESPN+	L 20–25	6,878
October 26	2:00 p.m.	at No. 6 Kennesaw State	Fifth Third Stadium; Kennesaw, GA	ESPN3	L 17–41	4,546
November 2	1:30 p.m.	Campbell	Braly Municipal Stadium; Florence, AL	ESPN+	W 25–24	8,953
November 9	11:00 a.m.	at No. 19 Monmouth	Kessler Stadium; West Long Branch, NJ	ESPN+	L 38–49	3,132
November 16	12:30 p.m.	at Gardner–Webb	Ernest W. Spangler Stadium; Boiling Springs, NC	ESPN+	W 34–30	1,486
*Non-conference game; ^{†}Homecoming; Rankings from STATS Poll released prior to the game; All times are in Central time

== Preseason ==
=== Big South poll ===
The Big South preseason poll was released on July 21, 2019. Due to their transition to NCAA Division I, North Alabama was not ranked.

=== Preseason All–Big South team ===
The Lions had one player selected to the preseason all-Big South team.

Offense

Jakobi Byrd – WR

== Game summaries ==
=== Western Illinois ===
	1	2	3	4	Total
Leathernecks	0	14	3	0	17
Lions	6	13	7	0	26

=== At Montana ===
	1	2	3	4	Total
Lions	7	10	0	0	17
Grizzlies	10	6	24	21	61

=== Alabama A&M ===
	1	2	3	4	Total
Bulldogs	0	0	21	10	31
Lions	9	9	3	3	24

=== At Jacksonville State ===
	1	2	3	4	Total
Lions	0	6	6	0	12
No. 10 Gamecocks	7	16	0	7	30

=== Presbyterian ===
	1	2	3	4	Total
Blue Hose	2	7	6	6	21
Lions	7	14	17	3	41

=== At Hampton ===
	1	2	3	4	Total
Lions	2	0	13	19	34
Pirates	6	14	3	17	40

=== Charleston Southern ===
	1	2	3	4	Total
Buccaneers	10	3	3	9	25
Lions	11	0	6	3	20

=== At Kennesaw State ===
	1	2	3	4	Total
Lions	7	10	0	0	17
No. 6 Owls	6	21	7	7	41

=== Campbell ===
	1	2	3	4	Total
Fighting Camels	0	14	7	3	24
Lions	0	15	7	3	25

=== At Monmouth ===
	1	2	3	4	Total
Lions	0	7	10	21	38
No. 19 Hawks	7	7	21	14	49

=== At Gardner–Webb ===
	1	2	3	4	Total
Lions	0	14	7	13	34
Runnin' Bulldogs	7	13	3	7	30
