= 2019 Austin Peay Governors football team =

American college football season

2019 Austin Peay Governors football

Ohio Valley Conference co-champion

NCAA Division I Quarterfinals, L 10–24 vs. Montana State
- Conference: Ohio Valley Conference

Ranking
- STATS: No. 8
- FCS Coaches: No. 10
- Record: 11–4 (7–1 OVC)
- Head coach: Mark Hudspeth (1st season)
- Offensive coordinator: Tim Zetts (1st season)
- Defensive coordinator: Mark Powell (1st season)
- Home stadium: Fortera Stadium

2019 Ohio Valley Conference football standings
	Conf.			Overall
Team	W		L	W		L
No. 8 Austin Peay +^	7	–	1	9	–	3
No. 17 Southeast Missouri State +^	7	–	1	9	–	3
UT Martin	6	–	2	7	–	5
Eastern Kentucky	5	–	3	7	–	5
Tennessee Tech	3	–	5	6	–	6
Jacksonville State	3	–	5	6	–	6
Murray State	2	–	6	4	–	8
Tennessee State	2	–	6	3	–	9
Eastern Illinois	1	–	7	1	–	11
+ – Conference co-champions; ^ – FCS playoff participant; Rankings from STATS Poll

The 2019 Austin Peay Governors football team represented Austin Peay State University during the 2019 NCAA Division I FCS football season. The Governors, led by first-year head coach Mark Hudspeth, played their home games at Fortera Stadium as members of the Ohio Valley Conference.

== Preseason ==
=== Preseason coaches' poll ===
The OVC released their preseason coaches' poll on July 22, 2019. The Governors were picked to finish in fourth place.

=== Preseason All-OVC team ===
The Governors had two players at two positions selected to the preseason all-OVC team.

Offense

Kentel Williams – RB

Kyle Anderton – OT

== Coaching staff ==
- Head coach – Mark Hudspeth
- Associate head coach/defensive line coach – Marquase Lovings
- Offensive coordinator/quarterbacks coach – Tim Zetts
- Defensive coordinator/linebackers coach – Mark Powell
- Co-defensive coordinator/secondary Coach – Dominique Brown
- Wide receivers coach – Chad Bumphis
- Running backs coach – Craig Candeto
- Offensive line coach – Eddy Morrissey
- Nickels coach – Keith Scott
- Assistant defensive line coach – Kevon Beckwith

== Schedule ==
Date	Time	Opponent	Rank	Site	TV	Result	Attendance
August 29	7:00 p.m.	North Carolina Central*		Fortera Stadium; Clarksville, TN	ESPN+	W 41–10	7,512
September 7	2:00 p.m.	No. 20 Central Arkansas*		Fortera Stadium; Clarksville, TN	ESPN+	L 16–24	7,523
September 14	6:00 p.m.	at Mercer*		Five Star Stadium; Macon, GA	ESPN+	W 48–34	11,478
September 21	6:30 p.m.	at East Tennessee State*		William B. Greene Jr. Stadium; Johnson City, TN	ESPN+	L 14–20	9,350
September 28	2:00 p.m.	No. 11 Jacksonville State		Fortera Stadium; Clarksville, TN	ESPN+	W 52–33	7,027
October 12	2:00 p.m.	No. 20 Southeast Missouri State		Fortera Stadium; Clarksville, TN	ESPN+	W 28–24	6,343
October 19	4:30 p.m.	at Tennessee State	No. 20	Nissan Stadium; Nashville, TN (Sgt. York Trophy)	ESPN+	L 24–26	16,389
October 26	1:30 p.m.	at Tennessee Tech		Tucker Stadium; Cookeville, TN (Sgt. York Trophy)	ESPN+	W 58–21	2,572
November 2	12:00 p.m.	at Eastern Kentucky		Roy Kidd Stadium; Richmond, KY	ESPN+	W 28–21 ^{OT}	7,330
November 9	3:00 p.m.	UT Martin^{†}		Fortera Stadium; Clarksville, TN (Sgt. York Trophy)	ESPN+	W 38–24	8,369
November 16	12:00 p.m.	at Murray State	No. 22	Roy Stewart Stadium; Murray, KY	ESPN+	W 42–7	6,116
November 23	2:00 p.m.	Eastern Illinois	No. 20	Fortera Stadium; Clarksville, TN	ESPN+	W 35–7	6,818
November 30	12:00 p.m.	No. 16 Furman*	No. 18	Fortera Stadium; Clarksville, TN (NCAA Division I First Round)	ESPN3	W 42–6	3,559
December 7	8:00 p.m.	at No. 3 Sacramento State*	No. 18	Hornet Stadium; Sacramento, CA (NCAA Division I Second Round)	ESPN3	W 42–28	5,140
December 13	7:00 p.m.	at No. 5 Montana State*	No. 18	Bobcat Stadium; Bozeman, MT (NCAA Division I Quarterfinals)	ESPN3	L 10–24	14,017
*Non-conference game; ^{†}Homecoming; Rankings from STATS Poll released prior to the game; All times are in Central time

== Game summaries ==
=== North Carolina Central ===
	1	2	3	4	Total
Eagles	3	0	0	7	10
Governors	7	24	3	7	41

=== Central Arkansas ===
	1	2	3	4	Total
No. 20 Bears	0	3	7	14	24
Governors	0	0	13	3	16

=== At Mercer ===
	1	2	3	4	Total
Governors	7	6	14	21	48
Bears	10	3	7	14	34

=== At East Tennessee State ===
	1	2	3	4	Total
Governors	7	7	0	0	14
Buccaneers	3	7	0	10	20

=== Jacksonville State ===
	1	2	3	4	Total
No. 11 Gamecocks	7	0	7	19	33
Governors	10	21	14	7	52

=== Southeast Missouri State ===
	1	2	3	4	Total
No. 20 Redhawks	3	0	14	7	24
Governors	0	7	7	14	28

=== At Tennessee State ===
	1	2	3	4	Total
No. 20 Governors	10	7	7	0	24
Tigers	0	9	7	10	26

=== At Tennessee Tech ===
	1	2	3	4	Total
Governors	20	24	7	7	58
Golden Eagles	7	7	0	7	21

=== At Eastern Kentucky ===
	1	2	3	4	OT	Total
Governors	7	0	7	7	7	28
Colonels	10	0	0	11	0	21

=== UT Martin ===
	1	2	3	4	Total
Skyhawks	0	3	7	14	24
Governors	0	17	7	14	38

=== At Murray State ===
	1	2	3	4	Total
No. 22 Governors	7	7	7	21	42
Racers	0	0	7	0	7

=== Eastern Illinois ===
	1	2	3	4	Total
Panthers	0	7	0	0	7
No. 20 Governors	7	14	14	0	35

== FCS Playoffs ==
The Governors, even though the team shared the OVC title, APSU held the tiebreaker due to defeating SEMO in the regular season therefore receiving the automatic bid for the postseason tournament, with a first-round pairing against Furman.

=== Furman–First Round ===
	1	2	3	4	Total
No. 16 Paladins	0	3	0	3	6
No. 18 Governors	7	0	28	7	42

=== At Sacramento State–Second Round ===
	1	2	3	4	Total
No. 18 Governors	21	0	14	7	42
No. 3 Hornets	0	0	14	14	28

=== At Montana State–Quarterfinals ===
	1	2	3	4	Total
No. 18 Governors	0	3	0	7	10
No. 5 Bobcats	10	0	14	0	24

== Media Affiliates ==
=== Radio ===
- ESPN Radio Clarksville 104.1 and 540 AM

=== TV ===
- OVC on ESPN+
