= 2019 Charleston Southern Buccaneers football team =

American college football season

2019 Charleston Southern Buccaneers football
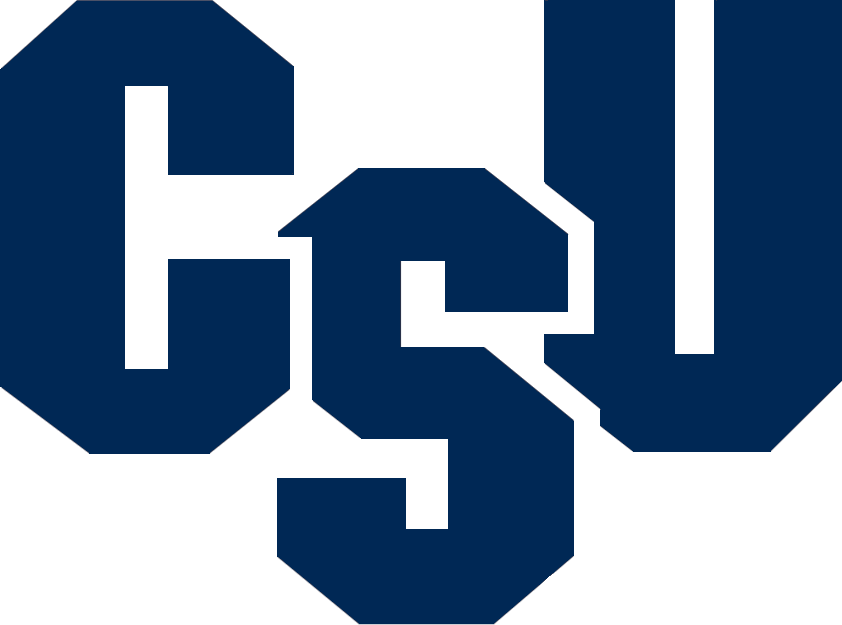
- Conference: Big South Conference
- Record: 6–6 (4–2 Big South)
- Head coach: Autry Denson (1st season)
- Offensive coordinator: Felton Huggins (1st season)
- Co-defensive coordinators: Zane Vance (3rd season); Bryant Foster (1st season)
- Home stadium: Buccaneer Field

2019 Big South Conference football standings
	Conf.			Overall
Team	W		L	W		L
No. 12 Monmouth $^	6	–	0	11	–	3
No. 13 Kennesaw State ^	5	–	1	11	–	3
Charleston Southern	4	–	2	6	–	6
Campbell	3	–	3	6	–	5
Hampton	1	–	5	5	–	7
Gardner–Webb	1	–	5	3	–	9
Presbyterian	1	–	5	2	–	10
North Alabama *	0	–	0	4	–	7
$ – Conference champion; ^ – FCS playoff participant; * North Alabama ineligible for FCS postseason play due to transition to NCAA Division I; Rankings from STATS Poll

The 2019 Charleston Southern Buccaneers football team represented Charleston Southern University as a member of the Big South Conference during the 2019 NCAA Division I FCS football season. Led by first-year head coach Autry Denson, the Buccaneers compiled an overall record of 6–6 with a mark of 4–2 in conference play, placing third in the Big South. Charleston Southern played home games at Buccaneer Field in Charleston, South Carolina.

== Preseason ==
=== Big South poll ===
In the Big South preseason poll released on July 21, 2019, the Buccaneers were predicted to finish in third place.

=== Preseason All–Big South team ===
The Buccaneers had three players selected to the preseason all-Big South team.

Offense

Zack Evans – OL

Defense

J.D. Sosebee – LB

Special teams

Ethan Ray – LS

== Schedule ==
Date	Time	Opponent	Site	TV	Result	Attendance
August 31	1:00 p.m.	at No. 19 Furman*	Paladin Stadium; Greenville, SC	ESPN3	L 13–46	6,146
September 7	12:00 p.m.	at South Carolina*	Williams-Brice Stadium; Columbia, SC	SEC Net.	L 10–72	70,698
September 14	6:00 p.m.	No. 15 North Carolina A&T*	Buccaneer Field; North Charleston, SC	ESPN+	L 21–27	5,112
September 21	6:00 p.m.	at No. 25 The Citadel*	Johnson Hagood Stadium; Charleston, SC	ESPN+	L 13–22	9,626
October 5	6:00 p.m.	Savannah State*	Buccaneer Field; North Charleston, SC	ESPN+	W 24–19	3,608
October 12	3:00 p.m.	at No. 7 Kennesaw State	Fifth Third Bank Stadium; Kennesaw, GA	ESPN+	L 23–45	8,258
October 19	7:00 p.m.	at North Alabama	Braly Municipal Stadium; Florence, AL	ESPN+	W 25–20	6,878
October 26	6:00 p.m.	Monmouth	Buccaneer Field; North Charleston, SC	ESPN+	L 13–35	3,358
November 2	1:30 p.m.	at Gardner–Webb	Ernest W. Spangler Stadium; Boiling Springs, NC	ESPN+	W 30–27	1,538
November 9	6:00 p.m.	Hampton	Buccaneer Field; North Charleston, SC	ESPN+	W 27–20 ^{OT}	2,746
November 16	1:00 p.m.	at Presbyterian	Bailey Memorial Stadium; Clinton, SC	ESPN+	W 27–7	1,834
November 23	3:30 p.m.	Campbell	Buccaneer Field; North Charleston, SC	ESPN+	W 41–31	3,208
*Non-conference game; Rankings from STATS Poll released prior to the game; All times are in Eastern time

== Game summaries ==
=== At Furman ===
	1	2	3	4	Total
Buccaneers	0	6	7	0	13
No. 19 Paladins	7	17	8	14	46

=== At South Carolina ===
	1	2	3	4	Total
Buccaneers	3	0	0	7	10
Gamecocks	21	23	7	21	72

=== North Carolina A&T ===
	1	2	3	4	Total
No. 15 Aggies	0	6	0	21	27
Buccaneers	7	7	0	7	21

=== At The Citadel ===
	1	2	3	4	Total
Buccaneers	0	3	3	7	13
No. 25 Bulldogs	0	7	13	2	22

=== Savannah State ===
	1	2	3	4	Total
Tigers	7	9	3	0	19
Buccaneers	7	0	7	10	24

=== At Kennesaw State ===
	1	2	3	4	Total
Buccaneers	0	6	7	10	23
No. 7 Owls	14	14	3	14	45

=== At North Alabama ===
	1	2	3	4	Total
Buccaneers	10	3	3	9	25
Lions	11	0	6	3	20

=== Monmouth ===
	1	2	3	4	Total
Hawks	7	7	14	7	35
Buccaneers	3	3	0	7	13

=== At Gardner–Webb ===
	1	2	3	4	Total
Buccaneers	10	14	6	0	30
Runnin' Bulldogs	0	0	7	20	27

=== Hampton ===
	1	2	3	4	OT	Total
Pirates	13	0	0	7	0	20
Buccaneers	3	7	7	3	7	27

=== At Presbyterian ===
	1	2	3	4	Total
Buccaneers	14	7	3	3	27
Blue Hose	0	0	0	7	7

=== Campbell ===
	1	2	3	4	Total
Fighting Camels	7	7	17	0	31
Buccaneers	14	13	7	7	41
