= 2019 Campbell Fighting Camels football team =

American college football season

2019 Campbell Fighting Camels football
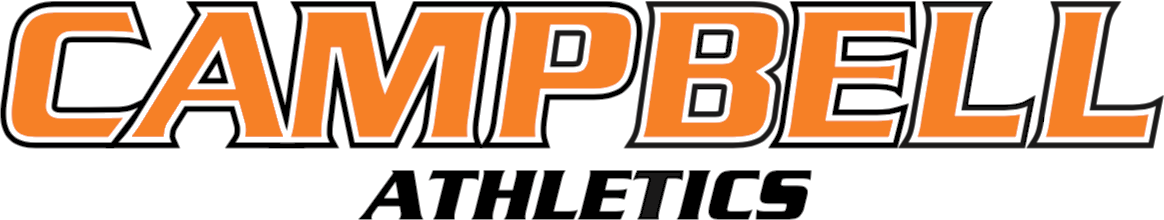
- Conference: Big South Conference
- Record: 6–5 (3–3 Big South)
- Head coach: Mike Minter (7th season)
- Offensive coordinator: Nick Grimes (1st season)
- Defensive coordinator: Weston Glaser (1st season)
- Home stadium: Barker–Lane Stadium

2019 Big South Conference football standings
| | Conf. | | | Overall |
| Team | W | | L | W | | L |
|---|---|---|---|---|---|---|
| No. 12 Monmouth $^ | 6 | – | 0 | 11 | – | 3 |
| No. 13 Kennesaw State ^ | 5 | – | 1 | 11 | – | 3 |
| Charleston Southern | 4 | – | 2 | 6 | – | 6 |
| Campbell | 3 | – | 3 | 6 | – | 5 |
| Hampton | 1 | – | 5 | 5 | – | 7 |
| Gardner–Webb | 1 | – | 5 | 3 | – | 9 |
| Presbyterian | 1 | – | 5 | 2 | – | 10 |
| North Alabama * | 0 | – | 0 | 4 | – | 7 |
$ – Conference champion; ^ – FCS playoff participant; * North Alabama ineligible for FCS postseason play due to transition to NCAA Division I; Rankings from STATS Poll

The 2019 Campbell Fighting Camels football team represented Campbell University in the 2019 NCAA Division I FCS football season. They were led by seventh-year head coach Mike Minter and played their home games at Barker–Lane Stadium. They were second-year members of the Big South Conference. They finished the season 6–5, 3–3 in Big South play to finish in fourth place.

== Preseason ==
=== Big South poll ===
In the Big South preseason poll released on July 21, 2019, the Camels were predicted to finish in fourth place.

=== Preseason All–Big South team ===
The Fighting Camels had seven players selected to the preseason all-Big South team.

Offense

Caleb Snead – WR

Michael Wooten – TE

Jacob Cuddington – OL

Matt Price – OL

Defense

Damien Dozier – DL

Dorian Jones – DB

Special teams

Brad Dennis – P

== Schedule ==
| Date | Time | Opponent | Site | TV | Result | Attendance |
|---|---|---|---|---|---|---|
| August 31 | 6:00 p.m. | at Troy* | Veterans Memorial Stadium; Troy, AL | ESPN+ | L 14–43 | 23,172 |
| September 7 | 6:00 p.m. | Shaw* | Barker–Lane Stadium; Buies Creek, NC | ESPN+ | W 38–14 | 6,047 |
| September 21 | 6:00 p.m. | Davidson* | Barker–Lake Stadium; Buies Creek, NC | ESPN+ | W 31–29 | 5,393 |
| September 28 | 7:00 p.m. | at Mercer* | Five Star Stadium; Macon, GA | ESPN3 | W 34–27 | 11,272 |
| October 5 | 1:00 p.m. | Presbyterian | Barker–Lake Stadium; Buies Creek, NC | ESPN3 | W 28–14 | 5,673 |
| October 19 | 4:00 p.m. | Hampton | Barker–Lake Stadium; Buies Creek, NC | ESPN+ | W 31–16 | 6,783 |
| October 26 | 1:30 p.m. | at Gardner–Webb | Ernest W. Spangler Stadium; Boiling Springs, NC | ESPN+ | W 49–47 ^{3OT} | 1,980 |
| November 2 | 2:30 p.m. | at North Alabama | Braly Municipal Stadium; Florence, AL | ESPN+ | L 24–25 | 8,953 |
| November 9 | 1:00 p.m. | No. 15 Kennesaw State | Barker–Lake Stadium; Buies Creek, NC | ESPN+ | L 35–38 | 5,039 |
| November 16 | 1:00 p.m. | No. 17 Monmouth | Barker–Lake Stadium; Buies Creek, NC | ESPN3 | L 10–47 | 3,468 |
| November 23 | 3:30 p.m. | at Charleston Southern | Buccaneer Field; North Charleston, SC | ESPN3/ESPN+ | L 31–41 | 3,208 |
*Non-conference game; Rankings from STATS Poll released prior to the game; All times are in Eastern time

== Game summaries ==
=== At Troy ===
| | 1 | 2 | 3 | 4 | Total |
|---|---|---|---|---|---|
| Fighting Camels | 7 | 0 | 0 | 7 | 14 |
| Trojans | 17 | 3 | 16 | 7 | 43 |

=== Shaw ===
| | 1 | 2 | 3 | 4 | Total |
|---|---|---|---|---|---|
| Bears | 7 | 0 | 0 | 7 | 14 |
| Fighting Camels | 7 | 21 | 0 | 10 | 38 |

=== Davidson ===
| | 1 | 2 | 3 | 4 | Total |
|---|---|---|---|---|---|
| Wildcats | 7 | 0 | 7 | 15 | 29 |
| Fighting Camels | 0 | 21 | 0 | 10 | 31 |

=== At Mercer ===
| | 1 | 2 | 3 | 4 | Total |
|---|---|---|---|---|---|
| Fighting Camels | 6 | 7 | 7 | 14 | 34 |
| Bears | 0 | 6 | 7 | 14 | 27 |

=== Presbyterian ===
| | 1 | 2 | 3 | 4 | Total |
|---|---|---|---|---|---|
| Blue Hose | 7 | 0 | 0 | 7 | 14 |
| Fighting Camels | 7 | 7 | 0 | 14 | 28 |

=== Hampton ===
| | 1 | 2 | 3 | 4 | Total |
|---|---|---|---|---|---|
| Pirates | 3 | 7 | 0 | 6 | 16 |
| Fighting Camels | 7 | 10 | 0 | 14 | 31 |

=== At Gardner–Webb ===
| | 1 | 2 | 3 | 4 | OT | 2OT | 3OT | Total |
|---|---|---|---|---|---|---|---|---|
| Fighting Camels | 0 | 13 | 0 | 14 | 7 | 7 | 8 | 49 |
| Runnin' Bulldogs | 10 | 14 | 3 | 0 | 7 | 7 | 6 | 47 |

=== At North Alabama ===
| | 1 | 2 | 3 | 4 | Total |
|---|---|---|---|---|---|
| Fighting Camels | 0 | 14 | 7 | 3 | 24 |
| Lions | 0 | 15 | 7 | 3 | 25 |

=== Kennesaw State ===
| | 1 | 2 | 3 | 4 | Total |
|---|---|---|---|---|---|
| No. 15 Owls | 0 | 17 | 14 | 7 | 38 |
| Fighting Camels | 7 | 14 | 0 | 14 | 35 |

=== Monmouth ===
| | 1 | 2 | 3 | 4 | Total |
|---|---|---|---|---|---|
| No. 17 Hawks | 0 | 17 | 16 | 14 | 47 |
| Fighting Camels | 7 | 3 | 0 | 0 | 10 |

=== At Charleston Southern ===
| | 1 | 2 | 3 | 4 | Total |
|---|---|---|---|---|---|
| Fighting Camels | 7 | 7 | 17 | 0 | 31 |
| Buccaneers | 14 | 13 | 7 | 7 | 41 |
