= 2019 UT Martin Skyhawks football team =

American college football season

2019 UT Martin Skyhawks football
- Conference: Ohio Valley Conference
- Record: 7–5 (6–2 OVC)
- Head coach: Jason Simpson (14th season)
- Offensive coordinator: Kevin Bannon (4th season)
- Defensive coordinator: Jordon Hankins (3rd season)
- Home stadium: Graham Stadium

2019 Ohio Valley Conference football standings
	Conf.			Overall
Team	W		L	W		L
No. 8 Austin Peay +^	7	–	1	9	–	3
No. 17 Southeast Missouri State +^	7	–	1	9	–	3
UT Martin	6	–	2	7	–	5
Eastern Kentucky	5	–	3	7	–	5
Tennessee Tech	3	–	5	6	–	6
Jacksonville State	3	–	5	6	–	6
Murray State	2	–	6	4	–	8
Tennessee State	2	–	6	3	–	9
Eastern Illinois	1	–	7	1	–	11
+ – Conference co-champions; ^ – FCS playoff participant; Rankings from STATS Poll

The 2019 UT Martin Skyhawks football team represented the University of Tennessee at Martin as a member of the Ohio Valley Conference (OVC) during the 2019 NCAA Division I FCS football season. Led by 14th-year head coach Jason Simpson, the Skyhawks compiled an overall record of 7–5 with a mark of 6–2 in conference play, placing third in the OVC. UT Martin played home games at Graham Stadium in Martin, Tennessee.

== Preseason ==
=== Preseason coaches' poll ===
The OVC released their preseason coaches' poll on July 22, 2019. The Skyhawks were picked to finish in sixth place.

=== Preseason All-OVC team ===
The Skyhawks had three players at two positions selected to the preseason all-OVC team.

Offense

Terry Fultz – OT

Defense

Julian Crutchfield – DL

Austin Pickett – DL

== Schedule ==
Date	Time	Opponent	Site	TV	Result	Attendance
August 29	6:30 p.m.	Northwestern State*	Graham Stadium; Martin, TN	ESPN+	W 42–20	3,008
September 7	6:30 p.m.	at No. 11 (FBS) Florida*	Ben Hill Griffin Stadium; Gainesville, FL	ESPNU	L 0–45	80,007
September 14	6:00 p.m.	at Southern Illinois*	Saluki Stadium; Carbondale, IL	ESPN+	L 14–28	8,983
September 28	6:00 p.m.	Murray State	Graham Stadium; Martin, TN	ESPN+	W 40–7	4,612
October 5	2:00 p.m.	at Eastern Kentucky	Roy Kidd Stadium; Richmond, KY	ESPN3	W 38–28	11,260
October 12	6:00 p.m.	at Tennessee Tech	Tucker Stadium; Cookeville, TN (Sgt. York Trophy)	ESPN+	W 55–14	5,330
October 19	2:00 p.m.	Eastern Illinois	Graham Stadium; Martin, TN	ESPN+	W 27–18	2,004
October 26	1:00 p.m.	at No. 24 Southeast Missouri State	Houck Stadium; Cape Girardeau, MO	ESPN+	L 10–17	2,467
November 2	2:00 p.m.	No. 22 Jacksonville State^{†}	Graham Stadium; Martin, TN	ESPN+	W 22–17	4,169
November 9	3:00 p.m.	at Austin Peay	Fortera Stadium; Clarksville, TN (Sgt. York Trophy)	ESPN+	L 24–38	8,679
November 16	2:00 p.m.	Tennessee State	Graham Stadium; Martin, TN (Sgt. York Trophy)	ESPN+	W 28–17	1,776
November 23	3:30 p.m.	at Kentucky*	Kroger Field; Lexington, KY	SECN	L 7–50	41,495
*Non-conference game; ^{†}Homecoming; Rankings from STATS Poll released prior to the game; All times are in Central time

== Game summaries ==
=== Northwestern State ===
	1	2	3	4	Total
Demons	7	13	0	0	20
Skyhawks	14	0	14	14	42

=== At Florida ===
	1	2	3	4	Total
Skyhawks	0	0	0	0	0
No. 11 (FBS) Gators	3	14	14	14	45

=== At Southern Illinois ===
	1	2	3	4	Total
Skyhawks	7	7	0	0	14
Salukis	0	14	14	0	28

=== Murray State ===
	1	2	3	4	Total
Racers	0	7	0	0	7
Skyhawks	14	10	3	13	40

=== At Eastern Kentucky ===
	1	2	3	4	Total
Skyhawks	7	10	14	7	38
Colonels	7	7	7	7	28

=== At Tennessee Tech ===
	1	2	3	4	Total
Skyahawks	10	17	21	7	55
Golden Eagles	0	0	0	14	14

=== Eastern Illinois ===
	1	2	3	4	Total
Panthers	11	0	0	7	18
Skyhawks	14	7	0	6	27

=== At Southeast Missouri State ===
	1	2	3	4	Total
Skyhawks	7	3	0	0	10
No. 24 Redhawks	3	0	7	7	17

=== Jacksonville State ===
	1	2	3	4	Total
No. 22 Gamecocks	7	7	0	3	17
Skyhawks	0	13	6	3	22

=== At Austin Peay ===
	1	2	3	4	Total
Skyhawks	0	3	7	14	24
Governors	0	17	7	14	38

=== Tennessee State ===
	1	2	3	4	Total
Tigers	7	3	7	0	17
Skyhawks	7	0	7	14	28

=== At Kentucky ===
	1	2	3	4	Total
Skyhawks	0	0	0	7	7
Wildcats	16	13	7	14	50
