= 2019 Eastern Illinois Panthers football team =

American college football season

2019 Eastern Illinois Panthers football
- Conference: Ohio Valley Conference
- Record: 1–11 (1–7 OVC)
- Head coach: Adam Cushing (1st season)
- Offensive coordinator: John Kuceyeski (1st season)
- Defensive coordinator: Chris Bowers (1st season)
- Home stadium: O'Brien Field

2019 Ohio Valley Conference football standings
| | Conf. | | | Overall |
| Team | W | | L | W | | L |
|---|---|---|---|---|---|---|
| No. 8 Austin Peay +^ | 7 | – | 1 | 9 | – | 3 |
| No. 17 Southeast Missouri State +^ | 7 | – | 1 | 9 | – | 3 |
| UT Martin | 6 | – | 2 | 7 | – | 5 |
| Eastern Kentucky | 5 | – | 3 | 7 | – | 5 |
| Tennessee Tech | 3 | – | 5 | 6 | – | 6 |
| Jacksonville State | 3 | – | 5 | 6 | – | 6 |
| Murray State | 2 | – | 6 | 4 | – | 8 |
| Tennessee State | 2 | – | 6 | 3 | – | 9 |
| Eastern Illinois | 1 | – | 7 | 1 | – | 11 |
+ – Conference co-champions; ^ – FCS playoff participant; Rankings from STATS Poll

The 2019 Eastern Illinois Panthers football team represented Eastern Illinois University as a member of the Ohio Valley Conference (OVC) during the 2019 NCAA Division I FCS football season. Led by first-year head coach Adam Cushing, the Panthers compiled an overall record of 1–11 overall with a mark of 1–7 in conference play, placing last out of nine teams in the OVC. Eastern Illinois played home games at O'Brien Field in Charleston, Illinois.

== Preseason ==
=== Preseason coaches' poll ===
The OVC released their preseason coaches' poll on July 22, 2019. The Panthers were picked to finish in eighth place.

=== Preseason All-OVC team ===
The Panthers had one player selected to the preseason all-OVC team.

Defense

Terrell Greer – DL

== Schedule ==
| Date | Time | Opponent | Site | TV | Result | Attendance |
|---|---|---|---|---|---|---|
| August 29 | 6:00 p.m. | at Chattanooga* | Finley Stadium; Chattanooga, TN | ESPN3 | L 10–24 | 8,254 |
| September 7 | 2:30 p.m. | at Indiana* | Memorial Stadium; Bloomington, IN | BTN | L 0–52 | 37,784 |
| September 14 | 2:00 p.m. | No. 13 Illinois State* | O'Brien Field; Charleston, IL (Mid-America Classic) | ESPN+ | L 3–21 | 6,119 |
| September 21 | 12:00 p.m. | at Indiana State* | Memorial Stadium; Terre Haute, IN | ESPN+ | L 6–16 | 6,216 |
| September 28 | 4:00 p.m. | Tennessee Tech | O'Brien Field; Charleston, IL | ESPN3 | L 29–40 | 7,055 |
| October 5 | 1:00 p.m. | at Murray State | Roy Stewart Stadium; Murray, KY | ESPN+ | L 17–24 | 4,205 |
| October 12 | 12:00 p.m. | No. 17 Jacksonville State | O'Brien Field; Charleston, IL | ESPN+ | L 20–28 | 3,170 |
| October 19 | 2:00 p.m. | at UT Martin | Graham Stadium; Martin, TN | ESPN+ | L 18–27 | 2,004 |
| October 26 | 2:00 p.m. | Eastern Kentucky^{†} | O'Brien Field; Charleston, IL | ESPN+ | L 6–33 | 4,000 |
| November 9 | 2:00 p.m. | at Tennessee State | Hale Stadium; Nashville, TN | ESPN+ | W 49–38 | 4,131 |
| November 16 | 12:00 p.m. | No. 15 Southeast Missouri State | O'Brien Field; Charleston, IL | ESPN+ | L 12–26 | 4,069 |
| November 23 | 2:00 p.m. | at No. 20 Austin Peay | Fortera Stadium; Clarksville, TN | ESPN+ | L 7–35 | 6,818 |
*Non-conference game; ^{†}Homecoming; Rankings from STATS Poll released prior to the game; All times are in Central time

== Game summaries ==
=== At Chattanooga ===
| | 1 | 2 | 3 | 4 | Total |
|---|---|---|---|---|---|
| Panthers | 3 | 7 | 0 | 0 | 10 |
| Mocs | 7 | 10 | 7 | 0 | 24 |

=== At Indiana ===
Eastern Illinois Panthers (0–1) vs Indiana Hoosiers (1–0) – Game summary

| Quarter | 1 | 2 | 3 | 4 | Total |
|---|---|---|---|---|---|
| Panthers | 0 | 0 | 0 | 0 | 0 |
| Hoosiers | 21 | 14 | 7 | 10 | 52 |

at Memorial Stadium • Bloomington, Indiana

- Date: September 7, 2019
- Game time: 3:30 p.m.
- Game weather: Partly cloudy, 72 °F (22 °C)
- Game attendance: 37,784
- Referee: Larry Smith
- TV announcers (BTN): Joe Beninati (play-by-play), Chuck Long (analyst)

Game information

First quarter

- (11:05) IU – Miles Marshall 10-yard pass from Michael Penix Jr., Logan Justus kick (Drive: 10 plays, 59 yards, 3:55; Indiana 7–0)
- (4:28) IU – Stevie Scott III 5-yard run, Logan Justus kick (Drive: 9 plays, 68 yards, 4:18; Indiana 14–0)
- (1:34) IU – Cole Gest 3-yard run (Drive: 2 plays, 32 yards, 0:29; Indiana 21–0)

Second quarter

- (1:44) IU – Peyton Hendershot 8-yard pass from Michael Penix Jr., Logan Justus kick (Drive: 10 plays, 80 yards, 4:41; Indiana 28–0)
- (1:07) IU – Ronnie Walker 64-yard pass from Peyton Ramsey, Logan Justus kick (Drive: 1 play, 64 yards, 8:33; Indiana 35–0)

Third quarter

- (7:19) IU – Donovan Hale 43-yard pass from Peyton Ramsey, Logan Justus kick (Drive: 6 plays, 96 yards, 3:07; Indiana 42–0)

Fourth quarter

- (13:28) IU – Sampson James 1-yard run, Logan Justus kick (Drive: 7 plays, 55 yards, 2:37; Indiana 49–0)
- (11:54) IU – Charles Campbell 48-yard field goal (Drive: 4 plays, 1 yard, 0:45; Indiana 52–0)

| Statistics | EIU | IU |
|---|---|---|
| First downs | 5 | 26 |
| Total yards | 116 | 555 |
| Rushes/yards | 31–52 | 34–114 |
| Passing yards | 64 | 441 |
| Passing: Comp–Att–Int | 11–25–0 | 30–41–0 |
| Time of possession | 27:25 | 32:35 |

| Team | Category | Player | Statistics |
|---|---|---|---|
| Eastern Illinois | Passing | Johnathan Brantley | 8/17, 49 yards |
| Eastern Illinois | Rushing | Darshon McCullough | 6 carries, 17 yards |
| Eastern Illinois | Receiving | James Sheehan | 2 receptions, 18 yards |
| Indiana | Passing | Peyton Ramsey | 13/14, 226 yards, 2 TD |
| Indiana | Rushing | Stevie Scott III | 12 carries, 61 yards, TD |
| Indiana | Receiving | Donavan Hale | 5 receptions, 110 yards, TD |

=== Illinois State ===
| | 1 | 2 | 3 | 4 | Total |
|---|---|---|---|---|---|
| No. 13 Redbirds | 7 | 7 | 7 | 0 | 21 |
| Panthers | 0 | 3 | 0 | 0 | 3 |

=== At Indiana State ===
| | 1 | 2 | 3 | 4 | Total |
|---|---|---|---|---|---|
| Panthers | 0 | 0 | 6 | 0 | 6 |
| Sycamores | 10 | 3 | 0 | 3 | 16 |

=== Tennessee Tech ===
| | 1 | 2 | 3 | 4 | Total |
|---|---|---|---|---|---|
| Golden Eagles | 0 | 21 | 13 | 6 | 40 |
| Panthers | 7 | 0 | 7 | 15 | 29 |

=== At Murray State ===
| | 1 | 2 | 3 | 4 | Total |
|---|---|---|---|---|---|
| Panthers | 0 | 7 | 3 | 7 | 17 |
| Racers | 7 | 2 | 7 | 8 | 24 |

=== Jacksonville State ===
| | 1 | 2 | 3 | 4 | Total |
|---|---|---|---|---|---|
| No. 17 Gamecocks | 7 | 14 | 0 | 7 | 28 |
| Panthers | 7 | 0 | 7 | 6 | 20 |

=== At UT Martin ===
| | 1 | 2 | 3 | 4 | Total |
|---|---|---|---|---|---|
| Panthers | 11 | 0 | 0 | 7 | 18 |
| Skyhawks | 14 | 7 | 0 | 6 | 27 |

=== Eastern Kentucky ===
| | 1 | 2 | 3 | 4 | Total |
|---|---|---|---|---|---|
| Colonels | 7 | 7 | 3 | 16 | 33 |
| Panthers | 0 | 0 | 0 | 6 | 6 |

=== At Tennessee State ===
| | 1 | 2 | 3 | 4 | Total |
|---|---|---|---|---|---|
| Panthers | 14 | 7 | 14 | 14 | 49 |
| Tigers | 14 | 21 | 3 | 0 | 38 |

=== Southeast Missouri State ===
| | 1 | 2 | 3 | 4 | Total |
|---|---|---|---|---|---|
| No. 15 Redhawks | 0 | 6 | 7 | 13 | 26 |
| Panthers | 7 | 0 | 3 | 2 | 12 |

=== At Austin Peay ===
| | 1 | 2 | 3 | 4 | Total |
|---|---|---|---|---|---|
| Panthers | 0 | 7 | 0 | 0 | 7 |
| No. 20 Governors | 7 | 14 | 14 | 0 | 35 |
