= 2019 Monmouth Hawks football team =

American college football season

2019 Monmouth Hawks football
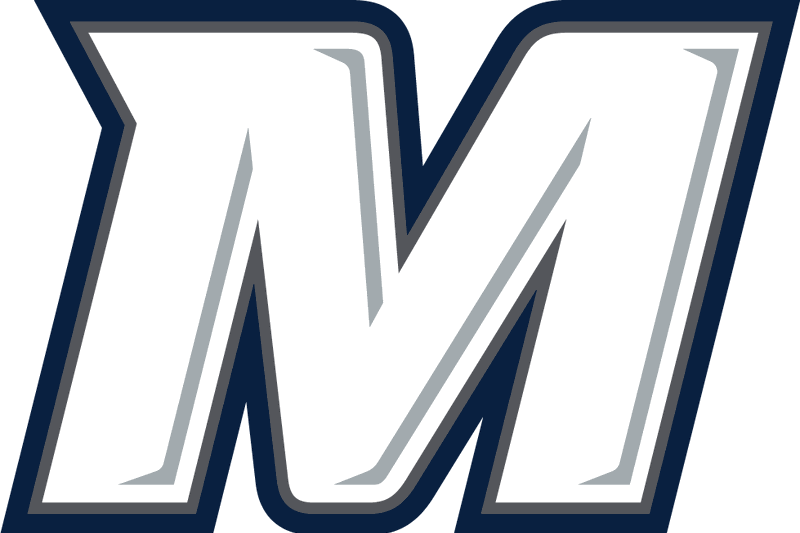

Big South champion

NCAA Division I Second Round, L 21–66 vs. James Madison
- Conference: Big South Conference

Ranking
- STATS: No. 12
- FCS Coaches: No. 13
- Record: 11–3 (6–0 Big South)
- Head coach: Kevin Callahan (27th season)
- Offensive coordinator: Jeff Gallo (1st season)
- Offensive scheme: Air raid
- Defensive coordinator: Andy Bobik (26th season)
- Base defense: 4–3
- Home stadium: Kessler Stadium

2019 Big South Conference football standings
| | Conf. | | | Overall |
| Team | W | | L | W | | L |
|---|---|---|---|---|---|---|
| No. 12 Monmouth $^ | 6 | – | 0 | 11 | – | 3 |
| No. 13 Kennesaw State ^ | 5 | – | 1 | 11 | – | 3 |
| Charleston Southern | 4 | – | 2 | 6 | – | 6 |
| Campbell | 3 | – | 3 | 6 | – | 5 |
| Hampton | 1 | – | 5 | 5 | – | 7 |
| Gardner–Webb | 1 | – | 5 | 3 | – | 9 |
| Presbyterian | 1 | – | 5 | 2 | – | 10 |
| North Alabama * | 0 | – | 0 | 4 | – | 7 |
$ – Conference champion; ^ – FCS playoff participant; * North Alabama ineligible for FCS postseason play due to transition to NCAA Division I; Rankings from STATS Poll

The 2019 Monmouth Hawks football team represented Monmouth University in the 2019 NCAA Division I FCS football season as a member of the Big South Conference. They were led by 27th-year head coach Kevin Callahan and played their home games at Kessler Field in West Long Branch, New Jersey. Monmouth finished the season 11–3 overall and 6–0 in Big South play to win the conference title. The Hawks received the Big South's automatic bid to the FCS Playoffs. They defeated Holy Cross in the first round before losing to James Madison in the second round.

== Preseason ==
=== Big South poll ===
In the Big South preseason poll released on July 21, 2019, the Hawks were predicted to finish in second place.

=== Preseason All–Big South team ===
The Hawks had five players selected to the preseason all-Big South team.

Offense

Kenji Bahar – QB

Juwon Farri – RB

Pete Guerriero – RB

Defense

Tymere Berry – DB

Special teams

Matt Mosquera – K

== Schedule ==
| Date | Time | Opponent | Rank | Site | TV | Result | Attendance |
|---|---|---|---|---|---|---|---|
| August 31 | 7:00 p.m. | at Western Michigan* | | Waldo Stadium; Kalamazoo, MI | ESPN3 | L 13–48 | 15,021 |
| September 7 | 1:00 p.m. | Lafayette* | | Kessler Stadium; West Long Branch, NJ | ESPN+ | W 24–21 | 2,955 |
| September 14 | 1:00 p.m. | Albany* | | Kessler Stadium; West Long Branch, NJ | ESPN+ | W 38–35 ^{OT} | 2,329 |
| September 21 | 3:00 p.m. | at No. 19 Montana* | | Washington–Grizzly Stadium; Missoula, MT | Pluto TV | L 27–47 | 23,119 |
| October 5 | 6:00 p.m. | at Wagner* | | Wagner College Stadium; Staten Island, NY | NEC Front Row | W 16–14 | 2,843 |
| October 12 | 1:00 p.m. | Presbyterian | | Kessler Stadium; West Long Branch, NJ | ESPN+ | W 45–0 | 2,433 |
| October 19 | 1:00 p.m. | Gardner–Webb | | Kessler Stadium; West Long Branch, NJ | ESPN3 | W 49–28 | 3,466 |
| October 26 | 6:00 p.m. | at Charleston Southern | | Buccaneer Field; Charleston, SC | ESPN+ | W 35–13 | 3,358 |
| November 2 | 2:00 p.m. | at No. 5 Kennesaw State | | Fifth Third Bank Stadium; Kennesaw, GA | ESPN3 | W 45–21 | 4,464 |
| November 9 | 12:00 p.m. | North Alabama | No. 19 | Kessler Stadium; West Long Branch, NJ | ESPN+ | W 49–38 | 3,132 |
| November 16 | 1:00 p.m. | at Campbell | No. 17 | Barker–Lane Stadium; Buies Creek, NC | ESPN3 | W 47–10 | 3,468 |
| November 23 | 12:00 p.m. | Hampton | No. 15 | Kessler Stadium; West Long Branch, NJ | ESPN+ | W 48–13 | 2,331 |
| November 30 | 12:00 p.m. | Holy Cross* | No. 14 | Kessler Stadium; West Long Branch, NJ (NCAA Division I First Round) | ESPN3 | W 44–27 | 2,817 |
| December 7 | 1:00 p.m. | at No. 2 James Madison* | No. 14 | Bridgeforth Stadium; Harrisonburg, VA (NCAA Division I Second Round) | ESPN3 | L 21–66 | 10,881 |
*Non-conference game; Rankings from STATS Poll released prior to the game; All times are in Eastern time

== Game summaries ==
=== At Western Michigan ===
| | 1 | 2 | 3 | 4 | Total |
|---|---|---|---|---|---|
| Hawks | 0 | 7 | 6 | 0 | 13 |
| Broncos | 21 | 10 | 14 | 3 | 48 |

=== Lafayette ===
| | 1 | 2 | 3 | 4 | Total |
|---|---|---|---|---|---|
| Leopards | 0 | 7 | 7 | 7 | 21 |
| Hawks | 7 | 14 | 0 | 3 | 24 |

=== Albany ===
| | 1 | 2 | 3 | 4 | OT | Total |
|---|---|---|---|---|---|---|
| Great Danes | 0 | 14 | 7 | 14 | 0 | 35 |
| Hawks | 7 | 14 | 7 | 7 | 3 | 38 |

=== At Montana ===
| | 1 | 2 | 3 | 4 | Total |
|---|---|---|---|---|---|
| Hawks | 0 | 14 | 6 | 7 | 27 |
| No. 19 Grizzlies | 0 | 21 | 12 | 14 | 47 |

=== At Wagner ===
| | 1 | 2 | 3 | 4 | Total |
|---|---|---|---|---|---|
| Hawks | 3 | 0 | 7 | 6 | 16 |
| Seahawks | 0 | 7 | 0 | 7 | 14 |

=== Presbyterian ===
| | 1 | 2 | 3 | 4 | Total |
|---|---|---|---|---|---|
| Blue Hose | 0 | 0 | 0 | 0 | 0 |
| Hawks | 21 | 17 | 7 | 0 | 45 |

=== Gardner–Webb ===
| | 1 | 2 | 3 | 4 | Total |
|---|---|---|---|---|---|
| Runnin' Bulldogs | 7 | 0 | 14 | 7 | 28 |
| Hawks | 7 | 14 | 21 | 7 | 49 |

=== At Charleston Southern ===
| | 1 | 2 | 3 | 4 | Total |
|---|---|---|---|---|---|
| Hawks | 7 | 7 | 14 | 7 | 35 |
| Buccaneers | 3 | 3 | 0 | 7 | 13 |

=== At Kennesaw State ===
| | 1 | 2 | 3 | 4 | Total |
|---|---|---|---|---|---|
| Hawks | 3 | 28 | 14 | 0 | 45 |
| No. 5 Owls | 7 | 0 | 7 | 7 | 21 |

=== North Alabama ===
| | 1 | 2 | 3 | 4 | Total |
|---|---|---|---|---|---|
| Lions | 0 | 7 | 10 | 21 | 38 |
| No. 19 Hawks | 7 | 7 | 21 | 14 | 49 |

=== At Campbell ===
| | 1 | 2 | 3 | 4 | Total |
|---|---|---|---|---|---|
| No. 17 Hawks | 0 | 17 | 16 | 14 | 47 |
| Fighting Camels | 7 | 3 | 0 | 0 | 10 |

=== Hampton ===
| | 1 | 2 | 3 | 4 | Total |
|---|---|---|---|---|---|
| Pirates | 7 | 6 | 0 | 0 | 13 |
| No. 15 Hawks | 14 | 17 | 14 | 3 | 48 |

== FCS Playoffs ==
The Hawks received an automatic bid (due to winning their conference) for the postseason tournament, with a first-round pairing against Holy Cross.

=== Holy Cross–First Round ===
| | 1 | 2 | 3 | 4 | Total |
|---|---|---|---|---|---|
| Crusaders | 0 | 7 | 6 | 14 | 27 |
| No. 14 Hawks | 7 | 19 | 11 | 7 | 44 |

=== At James Madison–Second Round ===
| | 1 | 2 | 3 | 4 | Total |
|---|---|---|---|---|---|
| No. 14 Hawks | 14 | 7 | 0 | 0 | 21 |
| No. 2 Dukes | 21 | 17 | 14 | 14 | 66 |

== Ranking movements ==
Ranking movements Legend: ██ Increase in ranking ██ Decrease in ranking — = Not ranked RV = Received votes
| | Week | | | | | | | | | | | | | | |
| Poll | Pre | 1 | 2 | 3 | 4 | 5 | 6 | 7 | 8 | 9 | 10 | 11 | 12 | 13 | Final |
|---|---|---|---|---|---|---|---|---|---|---|---|---|---|---|---|
| STATS FCS | RV | RV | RV | RV | — | — | — | RV | RV | RV | 19 | 17 | 15 | 14 | 12 |
| Coaches | RV | RV | — | — | — | — | — | — | RV | RV | 20 | 15 | 12 | 11 | 13 |
