= 2019 Tennessee State Tigers football team =

American college football season

2019 Tennessee State Tigers football
- Conference: Ohio Valley Conference
- Record: 3–9 (2–6 OVC)
- Head coach: Rod Reed (10th season)
- Offensive coordinator: Shannon Harris (1st season)
- Defensive coordinator: Garry Fisher (3rd season)
- Home stadium: Nissan Stadium; Hale Stadium

2019 Ohio Valley Conference football standings
	Conf.			Overall
Team	W		L	W		L
No. 8 Austin Peay +^	7	–	1	9	–	3
No. 17 Southeast Missouri State +^	7	–	1	9	–	3
UT Martin	6	–	2	7	–	5
Eastern Kentucky	5	–	3	7	–	5
Tennessee Tech	3	–	5	6	–	6
Jacksonville State	3	–	5	6	–	6
Murray State	2	–	6	4	–	8
Tennessee State	2	–	6	3	–	9
Eastern Illinois	1	–	7	1	–	11
+ – Conference co-champions; ^ – FCS playoff participant; Rankings from STATS Poll

The 2019 Tennessee State Tigers football team represented Tennessee State University as a member of the Ohio Valley Conference (OVC) in the 2019 NCAA Division I FCS football season. They were led by tenth-year head coach Rod Reed and played their home games at Nissan Stadium and Hale Stadium. Tennessee State finished the season 3–9 overall and 2–6 in OVC play to tie for seventh place.

== Preseason ==
=== Preseason coaches' poll ===
The OVC released their preseason coaches' poll on July 22, 2019. The Tigers were picked to finish in fifth place.

=== Preseason All-OVC team ===
The Tigers had four players selected to the preseason all-OVC team.

Offense

Chris Rowland – WR

Thomas Burton – C

Raekwon Allen – OG

Defense

Dajour Nesbeth – DB

=== Headlines ===
On August 20, 2019, it was announced that starting quarterback Demry Croft had been charged with six counts of felony rape and two counts of sexual battery, from an incident that took place on December 1, 2018.

== Schedule ==
Date	Time	Opponent	Site	TV	Result	Attendance
August 31	6:00 p.m.	Mississippi Valley State*	Nissan Stadium; Nashville, TN (John Merritt Classic)	ESPN+	W 26–20	13,458
September 7	6:00 p.m.	at Middle Tennessee*	Johnny "Red" Floyd Stadium; Murfreesboro, TN	ESPN3	L 26–45	20,912
September 14	6:00 p.m.	vs. Jackson State*	Liberty Bowl Memorial Stadium; Memphis, TN (Southern Heritage Classic)		L 44–49	48,347
September 21	2:00 p.m.	Arkansas–Pine Bluff	Hale Stadium; Nashville, TN	ESPN+	L 31–37	8,683
September 28	5:00 p.m.	at Eastern Kentucky	Roy Kidd Stadium; Richmond, KY	ESPN+	L 16–42	8,861
October 5	6:00 p.m.	at No. 21 Jacksonville State	JSU Stadium; Jacksonville, AL	ESPN+	L 23–31	16,589
October 12	2:00 p.m.	Murray State	Hale Stadium; Nashville, TN	ESPN+	L 17–31	5,324
October 19	4:30 p.m.	No. 20 Austin Peay	Nissan Stadium; Nashville, TN (Sgt. York Trophy)	ESPN+	W 26–24	16,389
November 2	2:00 p.m.	No. 18 Southeast Missouri State	Hale Stadium; Nashville, TN	ESPN3	L 13–32	4,378
November 9	2:00 p.m.	Eastern Illinois	Hale Stadium; Nashville, TN	ESPN+	L 38–49	4,131
November 16	2:00 p.m.	at UT Martin	Graham Stadium; Martin, TN (Sgt. York Trophy)	ESPN+	L 17–28	1,776
November 23	1:30 p.m.	at Tennessee Tech	Tucker Stadium; Cookeville, TN (Sgt. York Trophy)	ESPN+	W 37–27	2,728
*Non-conference game; Rankings from STATS Poll released prior to the game; All times are in Central time

== Game summaries ==
=== Mississippi Valley State ===
	1	2	3	4	Total
Delta Devils	0	6	7	7	20
Tigers	7	3	10	6	26

=== At Middle Tennessee ===
	1	2	3	4	Total
Tigers	6	0	13	7	26
Blue Raiders	0	10	14	21	45

=== Vs. Jackson State ===
	1	2	3	4	Total
JSU Tigers	21	7	14	7	49
TSU Tigers	7	7	9	21	44

=== Arkansas–Pine Bluff ===
	1	2	3	4	Total
Golden Lions	7	12	6	12	37
Tigers	7	3	14	7	31

=== At Eastern Kentucky ===
	1	2	3	4	Total
Tigers	3	6	7	0	16
Colonels	7	14	7	14	42

=== At Jacksonville State ===
	1	2	3	4	Total
Tigers	17	3	3	0	23
No. 21 Gamecocks	3	14	7	7	31

=== Murray State ===
	1	2	3	4	Total
Racers	7	14	0	10	31
Tigers	7	3	0	7	17

=== Austin Peay ===
	1	2	3	4	Total
No. 20 Governors	10	7	7	0	24
Tigers	0	9	7	10	26

=== Southeast Missouri State ===
	1	2	3	4	Total
No. 18 Redhawks	9	6	10	7	32
Tigers	0	0	7	6	13

=== Eastern Illinois ===
	1	2	3	4	Total
Panthers	14	7	14	14	49
Tigers	14	21	3	0	38

=== At UT Martin ===
	1	2	3	4	Total
Tigers	7	3	7	0	17
Skyhawks	7	0	7	14	28

=== At Tennessee Tech ===
	1	2	3	4	Total
Tigers	0	10	13	14	37
Golden Eagles	14	13	0	0	27

== Players drafted into the NFL ==
Round	Pick	Player	Position	NFL Club
7	227	Lachavious Simmons	OG	Chicago Bears
