= 2019 Gardner–Webb Runnin' Bulldogs football team =

American college football season

2019 Gardner–Webb Runnin' Bulldogs football
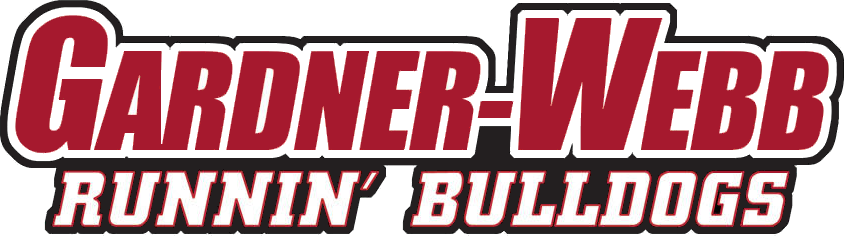
- Conference: Big South Conference
- Record: 3–9 (1–5 Big South)
- Head coach: Carroll McCray (7th season)
- Offensive coordinator: Brett Nichols (5th season)
- Co-defensive coordinators: Chris Grimes (1st season); Dennis Thomas (1st season)
- Home stadium: Ernest W. Spangler Stadium

2019 Big South Conference football standings
	Conf.			Overall
Team	W		L	W		L
No. 12 Monmouth $^	6	–	0	11	–	3
No. 13 Kennesaw State ^	5	–	1	11	–	3
Charleston Southern	4	–	2	6	–	6
Campbell	3	–	3	6	–	5
Hampton	1	–	5	5	–	7
Gardner–Webb	1	–	5	3	–	9
Presbyterian	1	–	5	2	–	10
North Alabama *	0	–	0	4	–	7
$ – Conference champion; ^ – FCS playoff participant; * North Alabama ineligible for FCS postseason play due to transition to NCAA Division I; Rankings from STATS Poll

The 2019 Gardner–Webb Runnin' Bulldogs football team represented Gardner–Webb University as a member of the Big South Conference during the 2019 NCAA Division I FCS football season. Led by Carroll McCray in his seventh and final season as head coach, the Runnin' Bulldogs compiled an overall record of 3–9 with a mark of 1–5 in conference play, placing in three-way tie for fifth place in the Big South. Gardner–Webb played home games at Ernest W. Spangler Stadium in Boiling Springs, North Carolina.

On November 24, McCray was fired. He finished his seven-season tenure at Gardner–Webb with a record of 27–53.

== Preseason ==
=== Big South poll ===
In the Big South preseason poll released on July 21, 2019, the Runnin' Bulldogs were predicted to finish in fifth place.

=== Preseason All–Big South team ===
The Runnin' Bulldogs had three players selected to the preseason all-Big South team.

Offense

Brandon Leahey – OL

Defense

John Singleton – DL

Darien Reynolds – LB

== Schedule ==
Date	Time	Opponent	Site	TV	Result	Attendance
August 29	7:30 p.m.	at Charlotte*	Jerry Richardson Stadium; Charlotte, NC	ESPN+	L 28–49	16,119
September 7	6:00 p.m.	at East Carolina*	Dowdy-Ficklen Stadium; Greenville, NC	ESPN3	L 9–48	34,118
September 14	6:00 p.m.	North Carolina Central*	Spangler Stadium; Boiling Springs, NC	ESPN+	W 21–12	5,012
September 21	6:00 p.m.	at Wofford*	Gibbs Stadium; Spartanburg, SC	ESPN+	L 10–49	3,777
October 5	3:00 p.m.	at Western Carolina*	E.J. Whitmire Stadium; Cullowhee, NC	ESPN+	W 24–21	11,865
October 12	1:30 p.m.	Hampton	Spangler Stadium; Boiling Springs, NC	ESPN+	W 35–27	6,300
October 19	1:00 p.m.	at Monmouth	Kessler Stadium; West Long Branch, NJ	ESPN3	L 28–49	3,466
October 26	1:30 p.m.	Campbell	Spangler Stadium; Boiling Springs, NC	ESPN+	L 47–49 ^{3OT}	1,980
November 2	1:30 p.m.	Charleston Southern	Spangler Stadium; Boiling Springs, NC	ESPN+	L 27–30	1,538
November 9	1:00 p.m.	at Presbyterian	Bailey Memorial Stadium; Clinton, SC	ESPN+	L 14–24	1,509
November 16	1:30 p.m.	North Alabama	Spangler Stadium; Boiling Springs, NC	ESPN+	L 30–34	1,486
November 23	2:00 p.m.	at No. 16 Kennesaw State	Fifth Third Bank Stadium; Kennesaw, GA	ESPN3/ESPN+	L 14–42	4,383
*Non-conference game; Rankings from STATS Poll released prior to the game; All times are in Eastern time

== Game summaries ==
=== At Charlotte ===
	1	2	3	4	Total
Runnin' Bulldogs	0	14	7	7	28
49ers	7	28	7	7	49

=== At East Carolina ===
	1	2	3	4	Total
Runnin' Bulldogs	0	7	2	0	9
Pirates	17	14	7	10	48

=== North Carolina Central ===
	1	2	3	4	Total
Eagles	3	6	0	3	12
Runnin' Bulldogs	0	7	7	7	21

=== At Wofford ===
	1	2	3	4	Total
Runnin' Bulldogs	0	3	0	7	10
Terriers	14	14	0	21	49

=== At Western Carolina ===
	1	2	3	4	Total
Runnin' Bulldogs	7	7	7	3	24
Catamounts	14	0	0	7	21

=== Hampton ===
	1	2	3	4	Total
Pirates	3	21	0	3	27
Runnin' Bulldogs	14	7	7	7	35

=== At Monmouth ===
	1	2	3	4	Total
Runnin' Bulldogs	7	0	14	7	28
Hawks	7	14	21	7	49

=== Campbell ===
	1	2	3	4	OT	2OT	3OT	Total
Fighting Camels	0	13	0	14	7	7	8	49
Runnin' Bulldogs	10	14	3	0	7	7	6	47

=== Charleston Southern ===
	1	2	3	4	Total
Buccaneers	10	14	6	0	30
Runnin' Bulldogs	0	0	7	20	27

=== At Presbyterian ===
	1	2	3	4	Total
Runnin' Bulldogs	0	14	0	0	14
Blue Hose	3	7	7	7	24

=== North Alabama ===
	1	2	3	4	Total
Lions	0	14	7	13	34
Runnin' Bulldogs	7	13	3	7	30

=== At Kennesaw State ===
	1	2	3	4	Total
Runnin' Bulldogs	7	0	0	7	14
No. 16 Owls	7	7	14	14	42
