= 2019 Presbyterian Blue Hose football team =

American college football season

2019 Presbyterian Blue Hose football
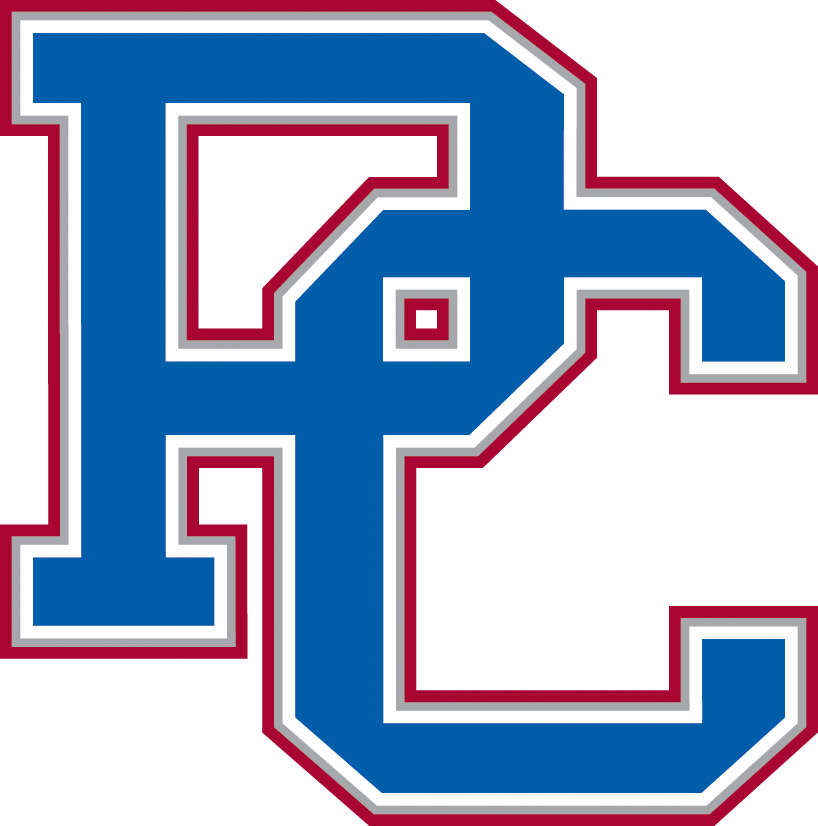
- Conference: Big South Conference
- Record: 2–10 (1–5 Big South)
- Head coach: Tommy Spangler (3rd season of stint, 9th overall season)
- Home stadium: Bailey Memorial Stadium

2019 Big South Conference football standings
	Conf.			Overall
Team	W		L	W		L
No. 12 Monmouth $^	6	–	0	11	–	3
No. 13 Kennesaw State ^	5	–	1	11	–	3
Charleston Southern	4	–	2	6	–	6
Campbell	3	–	3	6	–	5
Hampton	1	–	5	5	–	7
Gardner–Webb	1	–	5	3	–	9
Presbyterian	1	–	5	2	–	10
North Alabama *	0	–	0	4	–	7
$ – Conference champion; ^ – FCS playoff participant; * North Alabama ineligible for FCS postseason play due to transition to NCAA Division I; Rankings from STATS Poll

The 2019 Presbyterian Blue Hose football team represented Presbyterian College in the 2019 NCAA Division I FCS football season. They were led by third-year head coach Tommy Spangler, in his second stint as PC head coach, as he coached the Blue Hose from 2001–06. The Blue Hose played their home games at Bailey Memorial Stadium in their 13th and final season as members of the Big South Conference. They finished the season 2–10, 1–5 in Big South play to finish in a three-way tie for fifth place.

PC announced in 2017 that it had started a transition to non-scholarship football. After the 2019 season, PC will leave Big South football, though remaining a conference member in other sports. The Blue Hose will play the 2020 football season as an FCS independent, and will join the Pioneer Football League, a single-sport conference whose members do not award football scholarships, in 2021.

== Preseason ==
=== Big South poll ===
In the Big South preseason poll released on July 21, 2019, the Blue Hose were predicted to finish in seventh place.

=== Preseason All–Big South team ===
The Blue Hose had two players selected to the preseason all-Big South team.

Offense

Keith Pearson – WR

Defense

Colby Campbell – LB

== Schedule ==
Date	Time	Opponent	Site	TV	Result	Attendance
~~August 31~~	~~7:00 p.m.~~	~~at Stetson*~~	~~Spec Martin Stadium~~; ~~DeLand, FL~~	~~ESPN+~~	Cancelled (Note: The game against Stetson was cancelled on Saturday morning over safety concerns due to Hurricane Dorian.)	
September 7 (Note: On September 2, it was announced that Presbyterian had added a home game against Mercer to make up for the previous week's cancellation.)	2:00 p.m.	Mercer*	Bailey Memorial Stadium; Clinton, SC	ESPN+	L 7–45	1,264
September 14	7:00 p.m.	Jacksonville*	Bailey Memorial Stadium; Clinton, SC	ESPN+	L 20–30	2,208
September 21	1:00 p.m.	Eastern Kentucky*	Bailey Memorial Stadium; Clinton, SC	ESPN+	L 10–35	2,152
September 28	4:00 p.m.	at North Alabama	Braly Municipal Stadium; Florence, AL	ESPN+	L 21–41	8,573
October 5	1:00 p.m.	at Campbell	Barker–Lane Stadium; Buies Creek, NC	ESPN3	L 14–28	5,673
October 12	1:00 p.m.	at Monmouth	Kessler Field; West Long Branch, NJ	ESPN+	L 0–45	2,433
October 19	2:30 p.m.	No. 6 Kennesaw State^{†}	Bailey Memorial Stadium; Clinton, SC	ESPN+	L 10–55	1,635
October 26	1:00 p.m.	at Merrimack*	Duane Stadium; North Andover, MA	NEC Front Row	L 21–24	1,721
November 2	1:00 p.m.	at Hampton	Armstrong Stadium; Hampton, VA	ESPN+	L 17–40	4,123
November 9	1:00 p.m.	Gardner–Webb	Bailey Memorial Stadium; Clinton, SC	ESPN+	W 24–14	1,509
November 16	1:00 p.m.	Charleston Southern	Bailey Memorial Stadium; Clinton, SC	ESPN+	L 7–27	1,834
November 23	1:00 p.m.	St. Andrews*	Bailey Memorial Stadium; Clinton, SC	ESPN+	W 52–14	1,208
*Non-conference game; ^{†}Homecoming; Rankings from STATS Poll released prior to the game; All times are in Eastern time

== Game summaries ==
=== Mercer ===
	1	2	3	4	Total
Bears	21	7	14	3	45
Blue Hose	0	0	0	7	7

=== Jacksonville ===
	1	2	3	4	Total
Dolphins	0	7	3	20	30
Blue Hose	3	10	0	7	20

=== Eastern Kentucky ===
	1	2	3	4	Total
Colonels	7	14	0	14	35
Blue Hose	10	0	0	0	10

=== At North Alabama ===
	1	2	3	4	Total
Blue Hose	2	7	6	6	21
Lions	7	14	17	3	41

=== At Campbell ===
	1	2	3	4	Total
Blue Hose	7	0	0	7	14
Fighting Camels	7	7	0	14	28

=== At Monmouth ===
	1	2	3	4	Total
Blue Hose	0	0	0	0	0
Hawks	21	17	7	0	45

=== Kennesaw State ===
	1	2	3	4	Total
No. 6 Owls	14	14	27	0	55
Blue Hose	7	3	0	0	10

=== At Merrimack ===
	1	2	3	4	Total
Blue Hose	7	7	0	7	21
Warriors	7	7	0	10	24

=== At Hampton ===
	1	2	3	4	Total
Blue Hose	3	0	14	0	17
Pirates	6	14	7	13	40

=== Gardner–Webb ===
	1	2	3	4	Total
Runnin' Bulldogs	0	14	0	0	14
Blue Hose	3	7	7	7	24

=== Charleston Southern ===
	1	2	3	4	Total
Buccaneers	14	7	3	3	27
Blue Hose	0	0	0	7	7

=== St. Andrews ===
	1	2	3	4	Total
Knights	0	14	0	0	14
Blue Hose	21	14	17	0	52
