= 2019 Eastern Kentucky Colonels football team =

American college football season

2019 Eastern Kentucky Colonels football
- Conference: Ohio Valley Conference
- Record: 7–5 (5–3 OVC)
- Head coach: Mark Elder (4th season)
- Offensive coordinator: Adam Austin (1st season)
- Defensive coordinator: Kurt Maddix (4th season)
- Co-defensive coordinator: Shannon Morrison (4th season)
- Home stadium: Roy Kidd Stadium

2019 Ohio Valley Conference football standings
| | Conf. | | | Overall |
| Team | W | | L | W | | L |
|---|---|---|---|---|---|---|
| No. 8 Austin Peay +^ | 7 | – | 1 | 9 | – | 3 |
| No. 17 Southeast Missouri State +^ | 7 | – | 1 | 9 | – | 3 |
| UT Martin | 6 | – | 2 | 7 | – | 5 |
| Eastern Kentucky | 5 | – | 3 | 7 | – | 5 |
| Tennessee Tech | 3 | – | 5 | 6 | – | 6 |
| Jacksonville State | 3 | – | 5 | 6 | – | 6 |
| Murray State | 2 | – | 6 | 4 | – | 8 |
| Tennessee State | 2 | – | 6 | 3 | – | 9 |
| Eastern Illinois | 1 | – | 7 | 1 | – | 11 |
+ – Conference co-champions; ^ – FCS playoff participant; Rankings from STATS Poll

The 2019 Eastern Kentucky Colonels football team represented Eastern Kentucky University during the 2019 NCAA Division I FCS football season. They were led by fourth-year head coach Mark Elder and played their home games at Roy Kidd Stadium as a member of the Ohio Valley Conference. They finished the season 7–5, 5–3 in OVC play to finish in fourth place. Elder was fired following the season. He finished with a record of 21–24.

== Preseason ==
=== Preseason coaches' poll ===
The OVC released their preseason coaches' poll on July 22, 2019. The Colonels were picked to finish in third place.

=== Preseason All-OVC team ===
The Colonels had three players at three positions selected to the preseason all-OVC team.

Offense

Daryl McCleskey Jr. – RB

Defense

Aaron Patrick – DL

Leodis Moore III – DB

== Schedule ==
| Date | Time | Opponent | Site | TV | Result | Attendance |
|---|---|---|---|---|---|---|
| August 29 | 7:00 p.m. | Valparaiso* | Roy Kidd Stadium; Richmond, KY | ESPN+ | W 53–7 | 11,130 |
| September 7 | 7:00 p.m. | at Louisville* | Cardinal Stadium; Louisville, KY | ACCN Extra | L 0–42 | 48,808 |
| September 14 | 1:00 p.m. | at Indiana State* | Memorial Stadium; Terre Haute, IN | ESPN+ | L 7–19 | 4,416 |
| September 21 | 1:00 p.m. | at Presbyterian* | Bailey Memorial Stadium; Clinton, SC | ESPN+ | W 35–10 | 2,152 |
| September 28 | 6:00 p.m. | Tennessee State | Roy Kidd Stadium; Richmond, KY | ESPN+ | W 42–16 | 8,861 |
| October 5 | 3:00 p.m. | UT Martin^{†} | Roy Kidd Stadium; Richmond, KY | ESPN3 | L 28–38 | 11,260 |
| October 19 | 3:00 p.m. | at Murray State | Roy Stewart Stadium; Murray, KY | ESPN+ | W 34–27 | 9,029 |
| October 26 | 3:00 p.m. | at Eastern Illinois | O'Brien Field; Charleston, IL | ESPN+ | W 33–6 | 4,000 |
| November 2 | 1:00 p.m. | Austin Peay | Roy Kidd Stadium; Richmond, KY | ESPN+ | L 21–28 ^{OT} | 7,330 |
| November 9 | 2:00 p.m. | at No. 17 Southeast Missouri State | Houck Stadium; Cape Girardeau, MO | ESPN3 | L 31–38 | 3,750 |
| November 16 | 1:00 p.m. | Tennessee Tech | Roy Kidd Stadium; Richmond, KY | ESPN+ | W 22–10 | 2,987 |
| November 23 | 2:00 p.m. | at Jacksonville State | JSU Stadium; Jacksonville, AL | ESPN3 | W 29–23 | 14,477 |
*Non-conference game; ^{†}Homecoming; Rankings from STATS Poll released prior to the game; All times are in Eastern time

== Game summaries ==
=== Valparaiso ===
| | 1 | 2 | 3 | 4 | Total |
|---|---|---|---|---|---|
| Crusaders | 0 | 0 | 7 | 0 | 7 |
| Colonels | 15 | 17 | 7 | 14 | 53 |

=== At Louisville ===
| | 1 | 2 | 3 | 4 | Total |
|---|---|---|---|---|---|
| Colonels | 0 | 0 | 0 | 0 | 0 |
| Cardinals | 14 | 0 | 14 | 14 | 42 |

=== At Indiana State ===
| | 1 | 2 | 3 | 4 | Total |
|---|---|---|---|---|---|
| Colonels | 0 | 0 | 7 | 0 | 7 |
| Sycamores | 3 | 7 | 0 | 9 | 19 |

=== At Presbyterian ===
| | 1 | 2 | 3 | 4 | Total |
|---|---|---|---|---|---|
| Colonels | 7 | 14 | 0 | 14 | 35 |
| Blue Hose | 10 | 0 | 0 | 0 | 10 |

=== Tennessee State ===
| | 1 | 2 | 3 | 4 | Total |
|---|---|---|---|---|---|
| Tigers | 3 | 6 | 7 | 0 | 16 |
| Colonels | 7 | 14 | 7 | 14 | 42 |

=== UT Martin ===
| | 1 | 2 | 3 | 4 | Total |
|---|---|---|---|---|---|
| Skyhawks | 7 | 10 | 14 | 7 | 38 |
| Colonels | 7 | 7 | 7 | 7 | 28 |

=== At Murray State ===
| | 1 | 2 | 3 | 4 | Total |
|---|---|---|---|---|---|
| Colonels | 7 | 10 | 17 | 0 | 34 |
| Racers | 3 | 7 | 7 | 10 | 27 |

=== At Eastern Illinois ===
| | 1 | 2 | 3 | 4 | Total |
|---|---|---|---|---|---|
| Colonels | 7 | 7 | 3 | 16 | 33 |
| Panthers | 0 | 0 | 0 | 6 | 6 |

=== Austin Peay ===
| | 1 | 2 | 3 | 4 | OT | Total |
|---|---|---|---|---|---|---|
| Governors | 7 | 0 | 7 | 7 | 7 | 28 |
| Colonels | 10 | 0 | 0 | 11 | 0 | 21 |

=== At Southeast Missouri State ===
| | 1 | 2 | 3 | 4 | Total |
|---|---|---|---|---|---|
| Colonels | 7 | 17 | 7 | 0 | 31 |
| No. 17 Redhawks | 7 | 7 | 7 | 17 | 38 |

=== Tennessee Tech ===
| | 1 | 2 | 3 | 4 | Total |
|---|---|---|---|---|---|
| Golden Eagles | 7 | 0 | 3 | 0 | 10 |
| Colonels | 7 | 9 | 0 | 6 | 22 |

=== At Jacksonville State ===
| | 1 | 2 | 3 | 4 | Total |
|---|---|---|---|---|---|
| Colonels | 6 | 3 | 14 | 6 | 29 |
| Gamecocks | 6 | 3 | 7 | 7 | 23 |

== Ranking movements ==
Ranking movements Legend: RV = Received votes
| | Week | | | | | | | | | | | | | |
| Poll | Pre | 1 | 2 | 3 | 4 | 5 | 6 | 7 | 8 | 9 | 10 | 11 | 12 | Final |
|---|---|---|---|---|---|---|---|---|---|---|---|---|---|---|
| STATS FCS | RV | | | | | | | | | | | | | |
| Coaches | RV | | | | | | | | | | | | | |
