= 2019 Murray State Racers football team =

American college football season

2019 Murray State Racers football
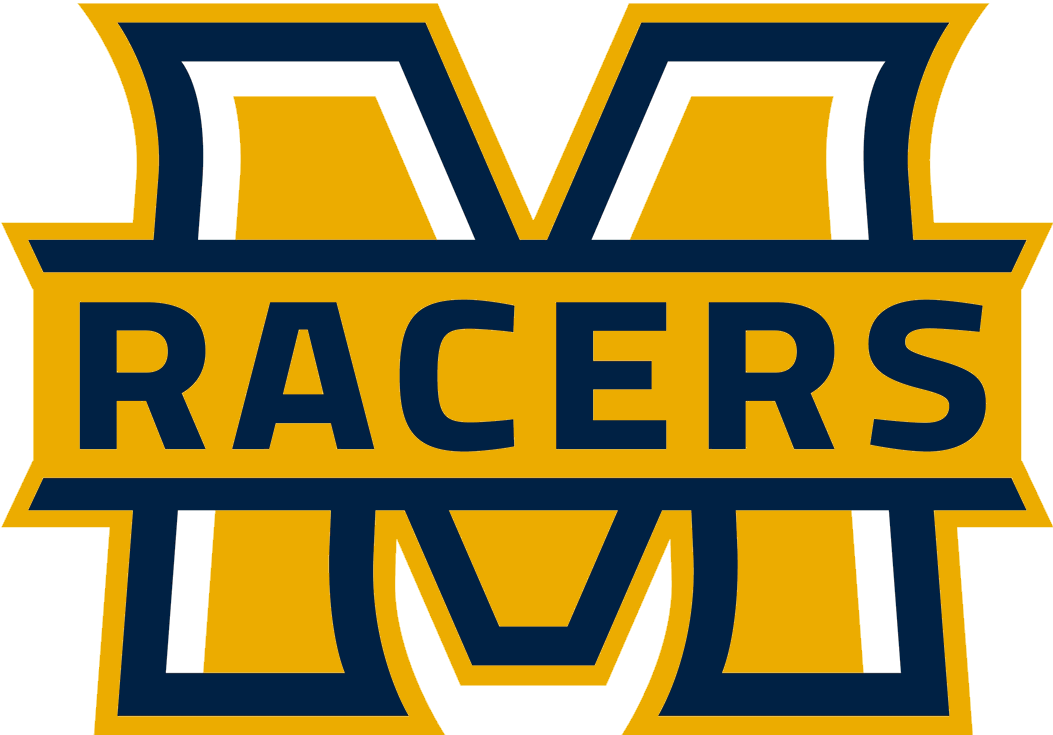
- Conference: Ohio Valley Conference
- Record: 4–8 (2–6 OVC)
- Head coach: Mitch Stewart (5th season)
- Offensive coordinator: Nick Coleman (2nd season)
- Defensive coordinator: Jake Johnson (2nd season)
- Home stadium: Roy Stewart Stadium

2019 Ohio Valley Conference football standings
	Conf.			Overall
Team	W		L	W		L
No. 8 Austin Peay +^	7	–	1	9	–	3
No. 17 Southeast Missouri State +^	7	–	1	9	–	3
UT Martin	6	–	2	7	–	5
Eastern Kentucky	5	–	3	7	–	5
Tennessee Tech	3	–	5	6	–	6
Jacksonville State	3	–	5	6	–	6
Murray State	2	–	6	4	–	8
Tennessee State	2	–	6	3	–	9
Eastern Illinois	1	–	7	1	–	11
+ – Conference co-champions; ^ – FCS playoff participant; Rankings from STATS Poll

The 2019 Murray State Racers football team represented Murray State University in the 2019 NCAA Division I FCS football season. They were led by fifth-year head coach Mitch Stewart and played their home games at Roy Stewart Stadium. They were members of the Ohio Valley Conference. They finished the season 4–8, 2–6 in OVC play to finish in a tie for seventh place. Stewart was reassigned to a new position within the athletic department following the season, he finished with a record of 19–37.

== Preseason ==
=== Preseason coaches' poll ===
The OVC released their preseason coaches' poll on July 22, 2019. The Racers were picked to finish in seventh place.

=== Preseason All-OVC team ===
The Racers had three players selected to the preseason all-OVC team.

Special teams

Gabriel Vicente – K

Steve Dawson – P

Malik Honeycutt – RS

== Schedule ==
Date	Time	Opponent	Site	TV	Result	Attendance
August 29	6:00 p.m.	Pikeville*	Roy Stewart Stadium; Murray, KY	ESPN+	W 59–20	6,829
September 7	3:00 p.m.	at No. 3 (FBS) Georgia*	Sanford Stadium; Athens, GA	ESPN2	L 17–63	92,746
September 14	6:00 p.m.	at Toledo*	Glass Bowl; Toledo, OH	ESPN3	L 0–45	25,361
September 21	6:00 p.m.	Morehead State*	Roy Stewart Stadium; Murray, KY	ESPN+	W 59–7	11,921
September 28	6:00 p.m.	at UT Martin	Graham Stadium; Martin, TN	ESPN+	L 7–40	4,612
October 5	1:00 p.m.	Eastern Illinois	Roy Stewart Stadium; Murray, KY	ESPN+	W 24–17	4,205
October 12	2:00 p.m.	at Tennessee State	Hale Stadium; Nashville, TN	ESPN+	W 31–17	5.324
October 19	2:00 p.m.	Eastern Kentucky^{†}	Roy Stewart Stadium; Murray, KY	ESPN+	L 27–34	9,029
October 26	3:00 p.m.	at No. 25 Jacksonville State	JSU Stadium; Jacksonville, AL	ESPN3	L 12–14	10,786
November 2	1:00 p.m.	Tennessee Tech	Roy Stewart Stadium; Murray, KY	ESPN+	L 7–17	5,302
November 16	12:00 p.m.	No. 22 Austin Peay	Roy Stewart Stadium; Murray, KY	ESPN3	L 7–42	
November 23	1:00 p.m.	at No. 13 Southeast Missouri State	Houck Stadium; Cape Girardeau, MO	ESPN+	L 24–31	
*Non-conference game; ^{†}Homecoming; Rankings from STATS Poll released prior to the game; All times are in Central time

== Game summaries ==
=== Pikeville ===
	1	2	3	4	Total
Bears	3	14	3	0	20
Racers	17	14	14	14	59

=== Week 2: at #3 Georgia ===
Week 2: Murray State Racers at #3 Georgia Bulldogs

Quarter	1	2	3	4	Total
Murray State	7	0	10	0	17
#3 Georgia	7	35	7	14	63

at Sanford Stadium, Athens, Georgia

- Date: September 7, 2019
- Game time: 4:00 pm
- Game attendance: 92,746
- TV announcers (ESPN2): Rocky Boiman, Anthony Becht and Beth Mowins
- Recap, Box Score

Game information

First quarter

- UGA –D'Andre Swift 3-yard run (Rodrigo Blankenship kick), 13:37. #3 Georgia 7–0. Drive: 4 plays, 56 yards, 1:23.
- MURR – Daquon Green 60-yard pass from Preston Rice (Gabriel Vincente kick), 6:36. Tied 7–7. Drive: 3 plays, 72 yards, 1:26.

Second quarter

- UGA – Brian Herrien 2-yard run (Rodrigo Blankenship kick), 14:24. #3 Georgia 14–7. Drive: 7 plays, 78 yards, 2:38.
- UGA – J.R. Reed 14-yard fumble return (Rodrigo Blankenship kick), 13:51. #3 Georgia 21–7.
- UGA – D'Andre Swift 10-yard run (Rodrigo Blankenship kick), 9:07. #3 Georgia 28–7. Drive: 4 plays, 41 yards, 2:18.
- UGA – George Pickens 15-yard pass from Jake Fromm (Rodrigo Blankenship kick), 6:11. #3 Georgia 35–7. Drive: 3 plays, 80 yards, 0:46.
- UGA – Zamir White 6-yard run (Rodrigo Blankenship kick), 2:11. #3 Georgia 42–7. Drive: 4 plays, 36 yards, 1:34.

Third quarter

- MURR – Nigel Walton 35-yard interception return (Gabriel Vincente kick), 9:33. #3 Georgia 42–14.
- UGA – Demetris Robertson 15-yard pass from Stetson Bennett (Rodrigo Blankenship kick), 5:22. #3 Georgia 49–14. Drive: 8 plays, 75 yards, 4:11.
- MURR – Gabriel Vincente 26-yard field goal, 1:18. #3 Georgia 49–17. Drive: 10 plays, 66 yards, 4:04.

Fourth quarter

- UGA – Dominick Blaylock 25-yard pass from Stetson Bennett (Rodrigo Blankenship kick), 10:49. #3 Georgia 56–17. Drive: 12 plays, 75 yards, 5:29.
- UGA – Stetson Bennett 1-yard run (Rodrigo Blankenship kick), 7:42. #3 Georgia 63–17. Drive: 3 plays, 30 yards, 1:27.

Top passers

- MURR – Preston Rice – 20/25, 216 yards, TD
- UGA – Jake Fromm – 10/11, 166 yards, TD

Top rushers

- MURR – Rodney Castille – 5 rushes, 8 yards
- UGA – Zamir White – 8 rushes, 72 yards, TD

Top receivers

- MURR – Daquon Green – 5 receptions, 101 yards, TD
- UGA – George Pickens – 4 receptions, 78 yards, TD

=== At Toledo ===
	1	2	3	4	Total
Racers	0	0	0	0	0
Rockets	3	14	21	7	45

=== Morehead State ===
	1	2	3	4	Total
Eagles	0	0	7	0	7
Racers	14	17	21	7	59

=== At UT Martin ===
	1	2	3	4	Total
Racers	0	7	0	0	7
Skyhawks	14	10	3	13	40

=== Eastern Illinois ===
	1	2	3	4	Total
Panthers	0	7	3	7	17
Racers	7	2	7	8	24

=== At Tennessee State ===
	1	2	3	4	Total
Racers	7	14	0	10	31
Tigers	7	3	0	7	17

=== Eastern Kentucky ===
	1	2	3	4	Total
Colonels	7	10	17	0	34
Racers	3	7	7	10	27

=== At Jacksonville State ===
	1	2	3	4	Total
Racers	0	0	7	5	12
No. 25 Gamecocks	7	7	0	0	14

=== Tennessee Tech ===
	1	2	3	4	Total
Golden Eagles	3	7	7	0	17
Racers	7	0	0	0	7

=== Austin Peay ===
	1	2	3	4	Total
No. 22 Governors	7	7	7	21	42
Racers	0	0	7	0	7

=== At Southeast Missouri State ===
	1	2	3	4	Total
Racers	7	17	0	0	24
No. 13 Redhawks	3	14	0	14	31
