= 2019 Jacksonville State Gamecocks football team =

American football team

2019 Jacksonville State Gamecocks football
- Conference: Ohio Valley Conference
- Record: 6–6 (3–5 OVC)
- Head coach: John Grass (6th season)
- Offensive coordinator: Jimmy Ogle (20th season)
- Co-defensive coordinators: William Green (1st season); Owen Kilgore (1st season)
- Home stadium: Burgess–Snow Field at JSU Stadium

2019 Ohio Valley Conference football standings
	Conf.			Overall
Team	W		L	W		L
No. 8 Austin Peay +^	7	–	1	9	–	3
No. 17 Southeast Missouri State +^	7	–	1	9	–	3
UT Martin	6	–	2	7	–	5
Eastern Kentucky	5	–	3	7	–	5
Tennessee Tech	3	–	5	6	–	6
Jacksonville State	3	–	5	6	–	6
Murray State	2	–	6	4	–	8
Tennessee State	2	–	6	3	–	9
Eastern Illinois	1	–	7	1	–	11
+ – Conference co-champions; ^ – FCS playoff participant; Rankings from STATS Poll

The 2019 Jacksonville State Gamecocks football team represented Jacksonville State University as a member of the Ohio Valley Conference (OVC) during the 2019 NCAA Division I FCS football season. Led by sixth-year head coach John Grass, the Gamecocks compiled an overall record of 6–6, with a mark of 3–5 conference play, tying for fifth place in the OVC. Jacksonville State played home games at Burgess–Snow Field at JSU Stadium in Jacksonville, Alabama.

== Preseason ==
=== Preseason coaches' poll ===
The OVC released their preseason coaches' poll on July 22, 2019. The Gamecocks were picked to finish in first place.

=== Preseason All-OVC team ===
The Gamecocks had seven players at seven positions selected to the preseason all-OVC team.

Offense

Zerrick Cooper – QB

Josh Pearson – WR

Trae Berry – TE

Darius Anderson – OG

Hunter Sosebee – OT

Defense

Jalen Choice – LB

Marlon Bridges – DB

== Schedule ==
Date	Time	Opponent	Rank	Site	TV	Result	Attendance
August 29	7:00 p.m.	at Southeastern Louisiana*	No. 6	Strawberry Stadium; Hammond, LA	ESPN+	L 14–35	7,116
September 7	6:00 p.m.	Chattanooga*	No. 18	Burgess–Snow Field at JSU Stadium; Jacksonville, AL	ESPN+	W 41–20	19,428
September 14	3:00 p.m.	No. 4 Eastern Washington*	No. 17	Burgess–Snow Field at JSU Stadium; Jacksonville, AL	ESPN+	W 49–45	20,901
September 21	6:00 p.m.	North Alabama*	No. 10	Burgess–Snow Field at JSU Stadium; Jacksonville, AL	ESPN+	W 30–12	21,976
September 28	2:00 p.m.	at Austin Peay	No. 11	Fortera Stadium; Clarksville, TN	ESPN+	L 33–52	7,027
October 5	6:00 p.m.	Tennessee State	No. 21	Burgess–Snow Field at JSU Stadium; Jacksonville, AL	ESPN+	W 31–23	16,589
October 12	12:00 p.m.	at Eastern Illinois	No. 17	O'Brien Field; Charleston, IL	ESPN+	W 28–20	3,170
October 19	3:00 p.m.	Southeast Missouri State^{†}	No. 16	Burgess–Snow Field at JSU Stadium; Jacksonville, AL	ESPN3	L 21–24	13,643
October 26	3:00 p.m.	Murray State	No. 25	Burgess–Snow Field at JSU Stadium; Jacksonville, AL	ESPN3	W 14–12	10,786
November 2	2:00 p.m.	at UT Martin	No. 22	Graham Stadium; Martin, TN	ESPN+	L 17–22	4,169
November 9	1:30 p.m.	at Tennessee Tech		Tucker Stadium; Cookeville, TN	ESPN+	L 27–37	11,331
November 23	1:00 p.m.	Eastern Kentucky		Burgess–Snow Field at JSU Stadium; Jacksonville, AL	ESPN3	L 23–29	14,477
*Non-conference game; ^{†}Homecoming; Rankings from STATS Poll released prior to the game; All times are in Central time

== Game summaries ==
=== At Southeastern Louisiana ===
	1	2	3	4	Total
No. 6 Gamecocks	0	7	0	7	14
Lions	14	7	7	7	35

=== Chattanooga ===
	1	2	3	4	Total
Mocs	3	3	14	0	20
No. 18 Gamecocks	7	14	6	14	41

=== Eastern Washington ===
	1	2	3	4	Total
No. 4 Eagles	28	7	10	0	45
No. 17 Gamecocks	7	14	7	21	49

=== North Alabama ===
	1	2	3	4	Total
Lions	0	6	6	0	12
No. 10 Gamecocks	7	16	0	7	30

=== At Austin Peay ===
	1	2	3	4	Total
No. 11 Gamecocks	7	0	7	19	33
Governors	10	21	14	7	52

=== Tennessee State ===
	1	2	3	4	Total
Tigers	17	3	3	0	23
No. 21 Gamecocks	3	14	7	7	31

=== At Eastern Illinois ===
	1	2	3	4	Total
No. 17 Gamecocks	7	14	0	7	28
Panthers	7	0	7	6	20

=== Southeast Missouri State ===
	1	2	3	4	Total
Redhawks	0	7	3	14	24
No. 16 Gamecocks	0	7	0	14	21

=== Murray State ===
	1	2	3	4	Total
Racers	0	0	7	5	12
No. 25 Gamecocks	7	7	0	0	14

=== At UT Martin ===
	1	2	3	4	Total
No. 22 Gamecocks	7	7	0	3	17
Skyhawks	0	13	6	3	22

=== At Tennessee Tech ===
	1	2	3	4	Total
Gamecocks	7	0	7	13	27
Golden Eagles	10	14	7	6	37

=== Eastern Kentucky ===
	1	2	3	4	Total
Colonels	6	3	14	6	29
Gamecocks	6	3	7	7	23

== Ranking movements ==
Ranking movements Legend: ██ Increase in ranking ██ Decrease in ranking — = Not ranked RV = Received votes
	Week														
Poll	Pre	1	2	3	4	5	6	7	8	9	10	11	12	13	Final
STATS FCS	6	18	17	10	11	21	17	16	25	22	RV	—	—	—	
Coaches	6	17	16	13	12	20	18	14	21	18	RV	—	—	—	
