= 2019 Kennesaw State Owls football team =

American college football season

2019 Kennesaw State Owls football

FCS Playoffs Second Round, L 20–26 vs. Weber State
- Conference: Big South Conference

Ranking
- STATS: No. 13
- FCS Coaches: No. 8
- Record: 11–3 (5–1 Big South)
- Head coach: Brian Bohannon (5th season)
- Offensive coordinator: Grant Chesnut (5th season)
- Offensive scheme: Flexbone option
- Defensive coordinator: Blake Harrell (1st season)
- Base defense: 4–2–5
- Home stadium: Fifth Third Bank Stadium

2019 Big South Conference football standings
	Conf.			Overall
Team	W		L	W		L
No. 12 Monmouth $^	6	–	0	11	–	3
No. 13 Kennesaw State ^	5	–	1	11	–	3
Charleston Southern	4	–	2	6	–	6
Campbell	3	–	3	6	–	5
Hampton	1	–	5	5	–	7
Gardner–Webb	1	–	5	3	–	9
Presbyterian	1	–	5	2	–	10
North Alabama *	0	–	0	4	–	7
$ – Conference champion; ^ – FCS playoff participant; * North Alabama ineligible for FCS postseason play due to transition to NCAA Division I; Rankings from STATS Poll

The 2019 Kennesaw State Owls football team represented Kennesaw State University in the 2019 NCAA Division I FCS football season. They were led by fifth-year head coach Brian Bohannon and played their home games at Fifth Third Bank Stadium in Kennesaw, Georgia as fifth-year members of the Big South Conference. They finished the season 11–3, 5–1 in Big South play to finish in second place. The Owls received an at-large bid to the FCS Playoffs. They defeated Wofford in the first round before losing to Weber State in the second round.

== Preseason ==
=== Big South poll ===
In the Big South preseason poll released on July 21, 2019, the Owls were predicted to finish in first place.

=== Preseason All–Big South team ===
The Owls had six players selected to the preseason all-Big South team.

Defense

Desmond Johnson – DL

Andrew Butcher – DL

Bryson Armstrong – LB

Dorian Walker – DB

Cincere Mason – DB

Special teams

Isaac Foster – KR/PR

== Schedule ==
Date	Time	Opponent	Rank	Site	TV	Result	Attendance
August 31	6:00 p.m.	Point*	No. 10	Fifth Third Bank Stadium; Kennesaw, GA	ESPN+	W 59–0	8,300
September 7	12:00 p.m.	at Kent State*	No. 9	Dix Stadium; Kent, OH	ESPN3	L 23–26 ^{OT}	18,679
September 14	6:00 p.m.	at Alabama State*	No. 9	New ASU Stadium; Montgomery, AL	ASU All Access	W 42–7	15,887
September 21	3:00 p.m.	at Missouri State*	No. 7	Plaster Stadium; Springfield, MO	ESPN+	W 35–24	11,421
September 28	6:00 p.m.	Reinhardt*	No. 6	Fifth Third Bank Stadium; Kennesaw, GA	ESPN+	W 31–7	6,978
October 12	3:00 p.m.	Charleston Southern	No. 7	Fifth Third Bank Stadium; Kennesaw, GA	ESPN3	W 45–23	8,258
October 19	2:30 p.m.	at Presbyterian	No. 6	Bailey Memorial Stadium; Clinton, SC	ESPN+	W 55–10	1,635
October 26	3:00 p.m.	North Alabama	No. 6	Fifth Third Bank Stadium; Kennesaw, GA	ESPN3	W 41–17	4,546
November 2	2:00 p.m.	Monmouth	No. 5	Fifth Third Bank Stadium; Kennesaw, GA	ESPN3	L 21–45	4,464
November 9	1:00 p.m.	at Campbell	No. 15	Barker–Lane Stadium; Buies Creek, NC	ESPN+	W 38–35	5,039
November 16	1:00 p.m.	at Hampton	No. 16	Armstrong Stadium; Hampton, VA	ESPN+	W 50–7	3,612
November 23	2:00 p.m.	Gardner–Webb	No. 16	Fifth Third Bank Stadium; Kennesaw, GA	ESPN3/ESPN+	W 42–14	4,383
November 30	3:00 p.m	at No. 11 Wofford*	No. 15	Gibbs Stadium; Spartanburg, SC (FCS Playoffs First Round)	ESPN3	W 28–21	1,992
December 7	3:00 p.m.	at No. 4 Weber State*	No. 15	Stewart Stadium; Ogden, UT (FCS Playoffs Second Round)	ESPN3	L 20–26	5,422
*Non-conference game; Rankings from STATS Poll released prior to the game; All times are in Eastern time

== Game summaries ==
=== Point ===
	1	2	3	4	Total
Skyhawks	0	0	0	0	0
No. 10 Owls	28	14	14	3	59

=== At Kent State ===
	1	2	3	4	OT	Total
No. 9 Owls	3	13	0	7	0	23
Golden Flashes	3	7	7	6	3	26

=== At Alabama State ===
	1	2	3	4	Total
No. 9 Owls	21	7	14	0	42
Hornets	0	0	7	0	7

=== At Missouri State ===
	1	2	3	4	Total
No. 7 Owls	0	7	21	7	35
Bears	6	10	0	8	24

=== Reinhardt ===
	1	2	3	4	Total
Eagles	0	7	0	0	7
No. 6 Owls	14	17	0	0	31

=== Charleston Southern ===
	1	2	3	4	Total
Buccaneers	0	6	7	10	23
No. 7 Owls	14	14	3	14	45

=== At Presbyterian ===
	1	2	3	4	Total
No. 6 Owls	14	14	27	0	55
Blue Hose	7	3	0	0	10

=== North Alabama ===
	1	2	3	4	Total
Lions	7	10	0	0	17
No. 6 Owls	6	21	7	7	41

=== Monmouth ===
	1	2	3	4	Total
Hawks	3	28	14	0	45
No. 5 Owls	7	0	7	7	21

=== At Campbell ===
	1	2	3	4	Total
No. 15 Owls	0	17	14	7	38
Fighting Camels	7	14	0	14	35

=== At Hampton ===
	1	2	3	4	Total
No. 16 Owls	21	10	12	7	50
Pirates	0	0	7	0	7

=== Gardner–Webb ===
	1	2	3	4	Total
Runnin' Bulldogs	7	0	0	7	14
No. 16 Owls	7	7	14	14	42

== FCS Playoffs ==
The Owls were selected for the postseason tournament, with a first-round pairing against Wofford.

=== At Wofford–First Round ===
	1	2	3	4	Total
No. 15 Owls	0	7	7	14	28
No. 11 Terriers	7	0	7	7	21

=== At Weber State–Second Round ===
	1	2	3	4	Total
No. 15 Owls	3	14	0	3	20
No. 4 Wildcats	3	9	14	0	26

== Ranking movements ==
Ranking movements Legend: ██ Increase in ranking ██ Decrease in ranking
	Week														
Poll	Pre	1	2	3	4	5	6	7	8	9	10	11	12	13	Final
STATS FCS	10	9	9	7	6	7	7	6	6	5	15	16	16	15	13
Coaches	10	7	7	6	4	4	4	4	4	4	11	11	9	9	8
