= 2019 Southeast Missouri State Redhawks football team =

American college football season

2019 Southeast Missouri State Redhawks football
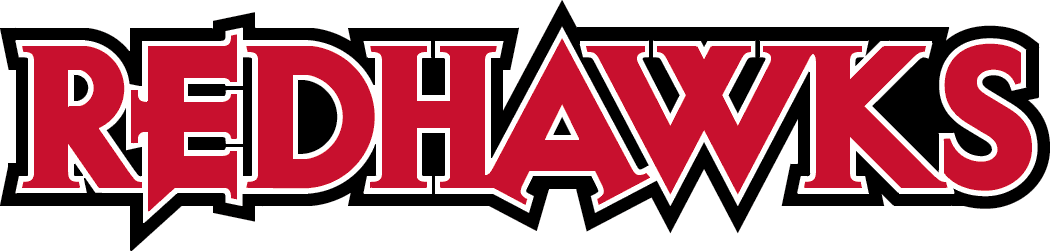

OVC co-champion

NCAA Division I First Round, L 6–24 vs. Illinois State
- Conference: Ohio Valley Conference

Ranking
- STATS: No. 17
- FCS Coaches: No. 16
- Record: 9–4 (7–1 OVC)
- Head coach: Tom Matukewicz (6th season)
- Offensive coordinator: Jeromy McDowell (2nd season)
- Defensive coordinator: Bryce Saia (6th season)
- Home stadium: Houck Stadium

2019 Ohio Valley Conference football standings
	Conf.			Overall
Team	W		L	W		L
No. 8 Austin Peay +^	7	–	1	9	–	3
No. 17 Southeast Missouri State +^	7	–	1	9	–	3
UT Martin	6	–	2	7	–	5
Eastern Kentucky	5	–	3	7	–	5
Tennessee Tech	3	–	5	6	–	6
Jacksonville State	3	–	5	6	–	6
Murray State	2	–	6	4	–	8
Tennessee State	2	–	6	3	–	9
Eastern Illinois	1	–	7	1	–	11
+ – Conference co-champions; ^ – FCS playoff participant; Rankings from STATS Poll

The 2019 Southeast Missouri State Redhawks football team represented Southeast Missouri State University as a member of the Ohio Valley Conference (OVC) during the 2019 NCAA Division I FCS football season. Led by sixth-year head coach Tom Matukewicz, the Redhawks compiled an overall record of 9–4 with a mark of 7–1 in conference play, sharing the OVC title with Austin Peay. Southeast Missouri State received an at-large bid to the NCAA Division I Football Championship playoffs, where the Redhawks lost to Illinois State in the first round. The team played home games at Houck Stadium in Cape Girardeau, Missouri.

== Preseason ==
=== Preseason coaches' poll ===
The OVC released their preseason coaches' poll on July 22, 2019. The Redhawks were picked to finish in second place.

=== Preseason All-OVC team ===
The Redhawks had six players at five positions selected to the preseason all-OVC team.

Offense

Daniel Santacaterina – QB

Kristian Wilkerson – WR

Defense

Clarence Thornton – DL

Zach Hall – LB

Justin Swift – LB

Bydarrius Knighten – DB

== Schedule ==
Date	Time	Opponent	Rank	Site	TV	Result	Attendance
August 29	6:30 p.m.	Southern Illinois*	No. 17	Houck Stadium; Cape Girardeau, MO	ESPN+	W 44–26	8,312
September 7	7:00 p.m.	at No. 13 Montana State*	No. 12	Bobcat Stadium; Bozeman, MT	Pluto TV	L 17–38	19,497
September 14	6:30 p.m.	at Missouri*	No. 19	Faurot Field; Columbia, MO	SECN Alt.	L 0–50	56,620
September 21	1:00 p.m.	West Virginia State*	No. 23	Houck Stadium; Cape Girardeau, MO	ESPN+	W 56–10	5,324
October 5	6:00 p.m.	Tennessee Tech	No. 23	Houck Stadium; Cape Girardeau, MO	ESPN+	W 43–37 ^{2OT}	4,373
October 12	2:00 p.m.	at Austin Peay	No. 20	Fortera Stadium; Clarksville, TN	ESPN+	L 24–28	6,343
October 19	3:00 p.m.	at No. 16 Jacksonville State		JSU Stadium; Jacksonville, AL	ESPN3	W 24–21	13,643
October 26	1:00 p.m.	UT Martin^{†}	No. 24	Houck Stadium; Cape Girardeau, MO	ESPN+	W 17–10	2,467
November 2	2:00 p.m.	at Tennessee State	No. 18	Hale Stadium; Nashville, TN	ESPN3	W 32–13	4,738
November 9	1:00 p.m.	Eastern Kentucky	No. 17	Houck Stadium; Cape Girardeau, MO	ESPN3	W 38–31	3,750
November 16	1:00 p.m.	at Eastern Illinois	No. 15	O'Brien Field; Charleston, IL	ESPN+	W 26–12	4,069
November 23	1:00 p.m.	Murray State	No. 13	Houck Stadium; Cape Girardeau, MO	ESPN+	W 31–24	2,764
November 30	1:00 p.m.	No. 13 Illinois State*	No. 12	Houck Stadium; Cape Girardeau, MO (NCAA Division I First Round)	ESPN3	L 6–24	3,274
*Non-conference game; ^{†}Homecoming; Rankings from STATS Poll released prior to the game; All times are in Central time

== Game summaries ==
=== Southern Illinois ===
	1	2	3	4	Total
Salukis	7	7	0	12	26
No. 17 Redhawks	0	20	17	7	44

=== At Montana State ===
	1	2	3	4	Total
No. 12 Redhawks	0	10	0	7	17
No. 13 Bobcats	10	0	28	0	38

=== At Missouri ===
	1	2	3	4	Total
No. 19 Redhawks	0	0	0	0	0
Tigers	27	10	10	3	50

=== West Virginia State ===
	1	2	3	4	Total
Yellow Jackets	0	0	10	0	10
No. 23 Redhawks	14	14	7	21	56

=== Tennessee Tech ===
	1	2	3	4	OT	2OT	Total
Golden Eagles	7	13	7	3	7	0	37
No. 23 Redhawks	6	14	3	7	7	6	43

=== At Austin Peay ===
	1	2	3	4	Total
No. 20 Redhawks	3	0	14	7	24
Governors	0	7	7	14	28

=== At Jacksonville State ===
	1	2	3	4	Total
Redhawks	0	7	3	14	24
No. 16 Gamecocks	0	7	0	14	21

=== UT Martin ===
	1	2	3	4	Total
Skyhawks	7	3	0	0	10
No. 24 Redhawks	3	0	7	7	17

=== At Tennessee State ===
	1	2	3	4	Total
No. 18 Redhawks	9	6	10	7	32
Tigers	0	0	7	6	13

=== Eastern Kentucky ===
	1	2	3	4	Total
Colonels	7	17	7	0	31
No. 17 Redhawks	7	7	7	17	38

=== At Eastern Illinois ===
	1	2	3	4	Total
No. 15 Redhawks	0	6	7	13	26
Panthers	7	0	3	2	12

=== Murray State ===
	1	2	3	4	Total
Racers	7	17	0	0	24
No. 13 Redhawks	3	14	0	14	31

=== Illinois State–NCAA Division I First Round ===
The Redhawks received an at-large bid to the NCAA Division I Football Championship playoffs, with a first-round pairing against Illinois State.

	1	2	3	4	Total
No. 13 Redbirds	14	7	0	3	24
No. 12 Redhawks	3	0	0	3	6

== Ranking movements ==
Ranking movements Legend: ██ Increase in ranking ██ Decrease in ranking RV = Received votes т = Tied with team above or below
	Week														
Poll	Pre	1	2	3	4	5	6	7	8	9	10	11	12	13	Final
STATS FCS	17	12	19	23	23	23	20	RV	24	18	17	15	13	12	
Coaches	18	13	20	25	RV	25-T	22	RV	RV	21	18	17	16	13	
