= 2019 Incarnate Word Cardinals football team =

American college football season

2019 Incarnate Word Cardinals football
- Conference: Southland Conference
- Record: 5–7 (4–5 Southland)
- Head coach: Eric Morris (2nd season)
- Offensive coordinator: Cody Crill (2nd season)
- Offensive scheme: Air raid
- Defensive coordinator: Justin Deason (2nd season)
- Base defense: Multiple
- Home stadium: Gayle and Tom Benson Stadium

2019 Southland Conference football standings
	Conf.			Overall
Team	W		L	W		L
No. 14 Nicholls +^	7	–	2	8	–	4
No. 11 Central Arkansas +^	7	–	2	9	–	3
No. 19 Southeastern Louisiana ^	6	–	3	8	–	5
Sam Houston State	6	–	3	7	–	5
McNeese State	5	–	4	7	–	5
Incarnate Word	4	–	5	5	–	7
Abilene Christian	4	–	5	5	–	7
Northwestern State	3	–	6	3	–	9
Stephen F. Austin	3	–	6	3	–	9
Houston Baptist	2	–	6	5	–	7
Lamar	2	–	7	4	–	8
+ – Conference co-champions; ^ – FCS playoff participant; Rankings from STATS poll

The 2019 Incarnate Word Cardinals football team represented the University of the Incarnate Word (UIW) in the 2019 NCAA Division I FCS football season as a member of the Southland Conference. The Cardinals played their home games at Gayle and Tom Benson Stadium in San Antonio, Texas. They were led by second-year head coach Eric Morris. They finished the season 5–7, 4–5 in Southland play to finish in a tie for 6th place.

== Preseason ==
=== Preseason All-Conference Teams ===
On July 11, 2019, the Southland Conference announced their Preseason All-Conference Teams, with the Cardinals having five players selected.

Offense First Team
- OL Brandon Floores – Senior
- OL Terence Hickman II – Senior

Offense Second Team

- QB Jon Copeland – Sophomore
- OL Uzoma Okere – Junior
- P David Balcomb – Senior

=== Preseason poll ===
On July 18, 2019, the Southland announced their preseason poll, with the Cardinals predicted to finish in third place. UIW also received one first place vote.

== Schedule ==
UIW announced its 2019 football schedule on February 13, 2019. The schedule consists of 6 home games and 6 away games.

Date	Time	Opponent	Site	TV	Result	Attendance
August 31	5:00 p.m.	at UTSA*	Alamodome; San Antonio, TX (Hometown Showdown)	ESPN3	L 7–35	26,787
September 7	6:00 p.m.	Texas Southern*	Gayle and Tom Benson Stadium; San Antonio, TX	ESPN+	W 63–44	3,637
September 21	6:00 p.m.	at Sam Houston State	Bowers Stadium; Huntsville, TX	ESPN3	L 6–45	8,196
September 28	6:00 p.m.	Abilene Christian	Gayle and Tom Benson Stadium; San Antonio, TX	UIWtv	W 31–24	2,989
October 5	6:00 p.m.	at Houston Baptist	Husky Stadium; Houston, TX	ESPN3	W 38–36	2,289
October 12	4:00 p.m.	at No. 23 Southeastern Louisiana	Strawberry Stadium; Hammond, LA	ESPN+	W 27–21	6,345
October 19	4:00 p.m.	Lamar	Gayle and Tom Benson Stadium; San Antonio, TX	ESPN3	W 35–17	3,048
October 26	4:00 p.m.	Northwestern State^{†}	Gayle and Tom Benson Stadium; San Antonio, TX	UIWtv	L 41–44 ^{OT}	3,373
November 2	4:00 p.m.	No. 25 Nicholls	Gayle and Tom Benson Stadium; San Antonio, TX	ESPN3	L 23–27	3,928
November 9	3:00 p.m.	at Stephen F. Austin	Homer Bryce Stadium; Nacogdoches, TX	ESPN3	L 24–31	6,321
November 16	1:00 p.m.	at New Mexico State*	Aggie Memorial Stadium; Las Cruces, NM	FloSports	L 28–41	25,804
November 22	6:30 p.m.	No. 11 Central Arkansas	Gayle and Tom Benson Stadium; San Antonio, TX	ESPN+	L 35–52	2,668
*Non-conference game; ^{†}Homecoming; Rankings from STATS Poll released prior to the game; All times are in Central time

== Personnel ==
=== Coaching staff ===
Name	Position	Alma mater	Joined staff
Eric Morris	Head coach	Texas Tech (2008)	2018
Josh Kirkland	Assistant head coach / Running Backs	West Texas A&M (2010)	2018
Cody Crill	Offensive coordinator	Angelo State (2002)	2018
Justin Deason	Defensive coordinator	Central Oklahoma (2003)	2018
Brandon Lechtenberg	Linebackers / Special Teams Coordinator	Nebraska	2018
Brett Watson	Interior Defensive Line / Academic Coordinator	West Texas A&M (2009)	2018
Darren Garrigan	Defensive backs / Pass Game Coordinator	West Texas A&M (2009)	2018
Steve Foley	Defensive ends	Louisiana-Monroe (1997)	2018
Jordan Shoemaker	Offensive line / Run Game Coordinator	Houston (2011)	2018
Jordan Davis	Wide receivers / Academic Coordinator	Texas Tech (2014)	2018
Mack Leftwich	Quarterbacks	UTEP (2017)	2018
Clint Killough	Quality control / On Campus Recruiting Coordinator	Incarnate Word (2015)	2018
Scotty Yates	Quality control	Texas A&M University–Commerce (2015)	2019
Beau Blair	Football Assistant – Offensive Line	Stephen F. Austin (2014)	2019
Bret Huth	Director of Strength and Conditioning	John Carroll (2010)	2018
Tad Blaylock	Assistant AD / Football Operations	Mississippi State (2012)	2018
Miguel Rodriguez	Player Personnel	UTSA (2014)	2017

=== Roster ===
2019 Incarnate Word Cardinals football
Quarterback: 1 Jon Copeland – sophomore (6'0, 194); 3 Sean Brophy – senior (6'2, 218); 5 Kevin Yeager – freshman (6'1, 204); 7 Taylor Brown – graduate Senior (6'1, 220); 10 Chandler Herman – junior (6'2, 240); Running back: 4 Kevin Brown – junior (5'9, 204); 13 Kenneth Bivins, Jr. – freshman (5'10, 198); 21 Roger McCuller – ATH – junior (6'1, 216); 22 Ameer King – sophomore (5'8, 180); 26 Kaleb Ducros – freshman (5'11, 197); 29 Keyondrick Philio – junior (6'0, 210); 35 Chance Trentman–Rosas – freshman (6'2, 230); 38 Antonio Arredondo – sophomore (5'9, 209); 46 Phillip Higgins – senior (6'0, 252); Wide receiver: 2 CJ Hardy – freshman (5'11, 189); 6 Lamont Johnson – (redshirt) senior (6'0, 167); 8 Gunnar Henderson – sophomore (5'9, 169); 11 Kamden Perry – freshman (6'0, 190); 12 Brandon McDuffie – (redshirt) freshman (6'3, 202); 14 Kam Williams – senior (6'2, 232); 15 Jaelin Campbell – sophomore (6'1, 182); 17 Mark Sullivan – sophomore (6'2, 163); 18 Hunter Cheek – freshman (6'1, 183); 19 Marquez Perez – (redshirt) freshman (5'11, 184); 30 Eric Phillips – freshman; 80 Deuce Caston – freshman (5'8, 186); 81 Brady Rogers – freshman (6'4, 192); 82 Colby Anthony – senior (5'10, 197); 83 Kristian Drake – freshman (6'2, 214); 87 Cole Brownholtz – senior (6'3, 192); 88 Liam Capobianco – freshman (6'3, 179); 89 Lanir Shabazz – freshman (6'0, 185); Kicker: 49 Tucker Littleton – freshman (5'9, 162); 50 David Albert – senior (5'11, 190); 59 Andrew Schreiner – freshman (5'11, 167); 92 Chase Franks – freshman (5'11, 150); 92 Carson Mohr – freshman (5'8, 143)	Offensive line: 60 Reid Francis – freshman (6'4, 307); 61 Matthew Alvarez – sophomore (6'4, 300); 62/98 Dawson Kier – C/FB – (redshirt) junior (6'3, 279); 63 Connor Homeyer – freshman (6'6, 274); 64 Jayden Borjas – freshman (6'5, 294); 65 Richard LeFevre – sophomore (6'4, 330); 67 Peter Gonzalez – freshman (6'0, 289); 68 Jhase Edwards – freshman (6'3, 279); 70 Ryan Carlson – junior (6'7, 289); 71 Cameron Wilson – senior (6'5, 303); 72 Brandon Floores – senior (6'4, 294); 73 Jeremiah Williams – sophomore (6'1, 292); 74 Caleb Johnson – sophomore (6'6, 306); 75 Jeremy Jones – senior (6'5, 303); 76 Jeriel Cervantes – (redshirt) sophomore (6'5, 283); 77 Terence Hickman II – senior (6'3, 285); 78 Uzoma Okere – junior (6'2, 292); Defensive line: 11 Lukas Termin – DT – senior (6'2, 280); 41 Darius Richmond – DT – freshman (6'2, 269); 42 Brian Lee – DT – senior (6'0, 271); 43 Mason Meyer – DE – freshman (6'3, 254); 45 Jared Soyring – DT – sophomore (6'3, 274); 47 Seth Jaquess – DE – freshman (6'4, 229); 53 Gabe Matous – DE – freshman (5'9, 222); 58 Axel Andrade – DE – freshman (5'11, 222); 66 Brendan Herring – DT – freshman (6'2, 278); 90 Sam Latham – DE – freshman (6'6, 253); 93 Cameron Preston – DT – sophomore (6'2, 298); 94 Markail Williams – DE – junior (6'3, 269); 95 Chance Main – DE – sophomore (6'5, 245); 96 Maverick McCaskill – DT – junior (6'3, 283); 97 Josh Jackson – DT – sophomore (6'0, 301); 99 TJ Wright – DE – (redshirt) sophomore (6'5, 259); Punter: 37 Cade Kostroun – junior (6'3, 178); 52 David Balcomb – senior (6'0, 193); Long snapper: 91 Josh Wells – (redshirt) sophomore (6'2, 237)	Linebacker: 9 Mar’kel Cooks – senior (6'0, 220); 21 Isaiah Paul – (redshirt) freshman (6'2, 241); 24 Matt Gaca – freshman (6'3, 215); 31 Mason Barnes – sophomore (5'10, 188); 32 Gerald Bowie – sophomore (6'1, 234); 33 Jerick Pitre – (redshirt) junior (5'11, 201); 44 Kelechi Anyalebechi – LB/DE – sophomore (6'1, 262); 47 Raynard Taylor – senior (5'8, 238); 54 Josh Centeno – sophomore (6'0, 208); 55 Urijah Marrow – freshman (5'9, 164); 56 Andy Jennings – LB/DE – (redshirt) senior (6'2, 233); 57 Ian Irby – (redshirt) freshman (6'0, 211); Defensive back: 1 Jaylon Jimmerson – ATH – freshman (6'0, 189); 3 Chris Thomas – CB – senior (6'2, 195); 4 Jaden Smith – CB – freshman (5'9, 172); 5 Dalvin Fillmore – S – sophomore (6'0, 190); 6 Ce'Cori Tolds – ATH – sophomore (5'10, 151); 7 Malick Phillips – ATH – junior (5'10, 172); 10 Louis Otis – CB – senior (6'3, 190); 13 Shaquirius Miller – S – junior (5'10, 177); 14 Jacob Harper – S – senior (6'2, 193); 16 Dante Heaggans – ATH – freshman (6'0, 182); 18 Reese Watson – CB – freshman (6'0, 176); 19 Tre Richardson – CB – freshman (6'1, 167); 20 Ian Peterson – S – (redshirt) junior (5'11, 179); 23 Kyle Covington – S – senior (6'2, 202); 25 Brandon Richard – CB – freshman (5'11, 183); 27 Ashton Preston – S – senior (6'0, 194); 28 Jaylen Stanford – CB – freshman (5'11, 188); 34 Shawn Holton – S – freshman (5'10, 166); 36 Payton Bourquin – S – freshman (6'1, 189); 39 Brandon Sanders – S – junior (6'0, 199); 40 Javier Macias – CB – junior (5'8, 183); 49 Hilario Gomez – CB – freshman (5'9, 182); Legend: (C) Team captain; (S) Suspended; (I) Ineligible; Injured; Redshirt

== Depth chart ==
Defense

FS
20 Ian Peterson, R-Jr
23 Kyle Covington, Sr

STAR	MIKE	MO	W
5 Dalvin Fillmore, So	32 Gerald Bowie, So	9 Mar'kel Cooks, Sr	56 Andy Jennings, R-Sr
1 Jaylon Jimmerson, Fr	21 Isaiah Paul, R-Fr	31 Mason Barnes, So	14 Jacob Harper, Sr

SS
27 Ashton Preston, Sr
6 Ce'Cori Tolds, So

CB
10 Louis Otis, Sr
25 Brandon Richard, Fr

DE	NT	DE
11 Lukas Termin, Sr	42 Brian Lee, Sr	94 Markail Williams, Jr
45 Jared Soyring, So	93 Cameron Preston, So	44 Kelechi Anyalebechi, So

CB
19 Tre Richardson, Fr
16 Dante Heaggans, Fr

Offense

X
6 Lamont Johnson, R-Sr
12 Brandon McDuffie, R-Fr

Z
15 Jaelin Campbell, So
17 Mark Sullivan, Jr

LT	LG	C	RG	RT
77 Terence Hickman, Sr	73 Jeremiah Williams, So	72 Brandon Floores, Sr	78 Uzoma Okere, Jr	75 Jeremy Jones, Sr
71 Cameron Wilson, Sr	64 Jayden Borjas, Fr	62 Dawson Kier, R-Fr	65 Richard LeFevre, So	70 Ryan Carlson, Jr

H
82 Colby Anthony, Sr
19 Marquez Perez, R-Fr

Y
14 Kam Williams, Sr
2 CJ Hardy, Fr

QB
1 Jon Copeland, So
3 Sean Brophy, Sr

Key reserves
RB 4 Kevin Brown, Jr
CB 7 Malick Phillips, Jr
S 34 Shawn Holton, Fr
DL 95 Chance Main, So
DL 99 TJ Wright, R-So

RB
22 Ameer King, So
29 Keyondrick Philio, Jr

Special teams
PK 92 Carson Mohr, Fr
PK 50 David Albert, Sr
P 52 David Balcomb, Sr
P 37 Cade Kostroun, Jr
KR 4 Jaden Smith, Fr
PR 4 Jaden Smith, Fr
LS 91 Josh Wells, R-So

== Postseason honors ==
The following Cardinals received postseason honors for the 2019 season:

All–Southland Conference Third–Team
OL Terence Hickman II – Senior
OL Brandon Floores – Senior
LB Kelechi Anyalebechi – Sophomore
DB Jaylon Jimmerson – Freshman

== Game summaries ==
=== @ UTSA ===
Hometown Showdown
Incarnate Word Cardinals at UTSA Roadrunners

Quarter	1	2	3	4	Total
Cardinals	0	7	0	0	7
Roadrunners	7	14	7	7	35

at Alamodome, San Antonio, Texas

- Date: August 31, 2019
- Game time: 5:00 p.m.
- Game weather: Indoors
- Game attendance: 26,787
- Referee: Joe Lehring
- TV announcers (ESPN3): Lincoln Rose (play-by-play), LaDarrin McLane (analyst)
- Box Score

Game information

First Quarter

- UTSA – 9:18 Carlos Strickland II 16 yard pass from Frank Harris, Hunter Duplessis kick
  UTSA 7–0 Drive: 5 plays, 40 yards, 2:24

Second Quarter

- UTSA – 14:27 Brenden Brady 10 yard run, Hunter Duplessis kick
  UTSA 14–0 Drive: 14 plays, 78 yards, 7:10
- UIW – 12:12 Ameer King 11 yard pass from Jon Copeland, Carson Mohr kick
  UTSA 14–7 Drive: 5 plays, 75 yards, 2:15
- UTSA – 7:38 Deven Boston 6 yard run, Hunter Duplessis kick
  UTSA 21–7 Drive: 10 plays, 65 yards, 4:34

Third Quarter

- UTSA – 9:26 Gavin Sharp 5 yard pass from Frank Harris, Hunter Duplessis kick
  UTSA 28–7 Drive: 7 plays, 59 yards, 3:31

Fourth Quarter

- UTSA – 9:53 Tykee Ogle-Kellogg 36 yard pass from Frank Harris, Hunter Duplessis kick
  UTSA 35–7 Drive: 7 plays, 91 yards, 3:36

Passing

- UIW – Jon Copeland 15/31, 181 YDS, 1 TD, 1 INT
- UTSA – Frank Harris 28/36, 206 YDS, 3 TD, 1 INT

Rushing

- UIW – Kevin Brown 6 ATT, 36 YDS
- UTSA – Frank Harris 15 ATT, 123 YDS

Receiving

- UIW – Lamont Johnson 5 REC, 70 YDS
- UTSA – Brenden Brady 5 REC, 47 YDS

=== Texas Southern ===
Texas Southern Tigers at Incarnate Word Cardinals

Quarter	1	2	3	4	Total
Tigers	7	10	20	7	44
Cardinals	14	28	7	14	63

at Gayle and Tom Benson Stadium, San Antonio, Texas

- Date: September 7, 2019
- Game time: 6:00 p.m.
- Game weather: Temperature: 100 • Wind: SSE 8 mph • Weather: Sunny
- Game attendance: 3,637
- Referee: Michael Vanderv
- TV announcers (ESPN+): Mike Lefko (play-by-play), Hector Ledesma (analyst), Jill Jelnick (sideline)
- Box Score

Game information

First Quarter

- UIW – 13:18 Keyondrick Philio 5 yard run, Carson Mohr kick
  UIW 7–0 Drive: 4 plays, 59 yards, 1:42
- UIW – 8:44 Kam Williams 12 yard pass from Jon Copeland, Carson Mohr kick
  UIW 14–0 Drive: 8 plays, 60 yards, 2:58
- TSU – 6:59 Chris Long 15 yard pass from De'Andre Johnson, Richard Garcia III kick
  UIW 14–7 Drive: 6 plays, 72 yards, 1:39

Second Quarter

- TSU – 14:51 Richard Garcia III 25 yard field goal
  UIW 14–10 Drive: 14 plays, 82 yards, 5:05
- UIW – 13:10 Kevin Brown 32 yard run, Carson Mohr kick
  UIW 21–10 Drive: 5 plays, 67 yards, 1:50
- UIW – 13:01 Shawn Holton 30 yard fumble return, Carson Mohr kick
  UIW 28–10
- UIW – 8:01 Ameer King 3 yard pass from Jon Copeland, Carson Mohr kick
  UIW 35–10 Drive: 5 plays, 85 yards, 2:09
- TSU – 5:02 Tren'Davian Dickson 87 yard pass from De'Andre Johnson, Richard Garcia III kick
  UIW 35–17 Drive: 2 plays, 88 yards, 0:25
- UIW – 2:42 Marquez Perez 25 yard pass from Jon Copeland, Carson Mohr kick
  UIW 42–17 Drive: 2 plays, 25 yards, 0:16

Third Quarter

- TSU – 12:32 Tren'Davian Dickson 15 yard pass from De'Andre Johnson, Richard Garcia III kick
  UIW 42–24 Drive: 6 plays, 75 yards, 2:28
- UIW – 9:50 Kam Williams 20 yard pass from Jon Copeland, Carson Mohr kick
  UIW 49–24 Drive: 9 plays, 70 yards, 2:42
- TSU – 8:43 LaDarius Owens 49 yard run, Richard Garcia III kick failed
  UIW 49–31 Drive: 3 plays, 75 yards, 1:07
- TSU – 6:10 LaDarius Owens 1 yard run, Richard Garcia III kick
  UIW 49–37 Drive: 4 plays, 54 yards, 1:11

Fourth Quarter

- UIW – 9:53 Kam Williams 70 yard pass from Jon Copeland, Carson Mohr kick
  UIW 56–37 Drive: 3 plays, 64 yards, 1:29
- UIW – 3:06 Keyondrick Philio 1 yard run, Carson Mohr kick
  UIW 63–37 Drive: 9 plays, 72 yards, 5:58
- TSU – 0:15 Roylain Oliver 3 yard pass from Devin Williams, Richard Garcia III kick
  UIW 63–44 Drive: 12 plays, 75 yards, 2:51

Passing

- TSU – De'Andre Johnson 20/30, 331 YDS, 3 TD, 1 INT
- UIW – Jon Copeland 25/40, 344 YDS, 5 TD

Rushing

- TSU – LaDarius Owens 14 ATT, 94 YDS, 2 TD
- UIW – Ameer King 14 ATT, 157 YDS

Receiving

- TSU – Tren'Davian Dickson 8 REC, 221 YDS, 2 TD
- UIW – Kam Williams 6 REC, 146 YDS, 3 TD

=== @ Sam Houston State ===
Incarnate Word Cardinals at Sam Houston State Bearkats

Quarter	1	2	3	4	Total
Cardinals	0	0	0	6	6
Bearkats	14	17	7	7	45

at Bowers Stadium, Huntsville, Texas

- Date: September 21, 2019
- Game time: 6:00 p.m.
- Game weather: Temperature: 85 • Wind: SE 8 mph • Weather: Partly cloudy
- Game attendance: 8,196
- Referee: Kevin Hassell
- TV announcers (ESPN3): Tom Franklin (play-by-play), Shea Walker (analyst)
- Box Score

Game information

First Quarter

- SHSU – 10:43 Dee Bowens 64 yard pass from Eric Schmid, Connor Crow kick
  SHSU 7–0 Drive: 1 play, 64 yards, 0:11
- SHSU – 0:00 Nathan Stewart 49 yard pass from Eric Schmid, Connor Crow kick
  SHSU 14–0 Drive: 8 plays, 83 yards, 3:21

Second Quarter

- SHSU – 9:00 Nathan Stewart 20 yard pass from Eric Schmid, Connor Crow kick
  SHSU 21–0 Drive: 4 plays, 74 yards, 1:26
- SHSU – 3:03 Connor Crow 22 yard field goal
  SHSU 24–0 Drive: 11 plays, 61 yards, 4:50
- SHSU – 0:57 Nathan Stewart 32 yard pass from Eric Schmid, Connor Crow kick
  SHSU 31–0 Drive: 6 plays, 65 yards, 0:57

Third Quarter

- SHSU – 3:50 Ife Adeyi 80 yard pass from Eric Schmid, Connor Crow kick
  SHSU 38–0 Drive: 1 play, 80 yards, 0:11

Fourth Quarter

- SHSU – 11:29 Donovan Williams 1 yard run, Connor Crow kick
  SHSU 45–0 Drive: 13 plays, 79 yards, 4:29
- UIW – 2:38 Kaleb Ducros 1 yard run, Carson Mohr kick failed
  SHSU 45–6 Drive: 8 plays, 30 yards, 2:23

Passing

- UIW – Jon Copeland 23/47, 257 YDS, 2 INT
- SHSU – Eric Schmid 29/44, 531 YDS, 5 TD, 1 INT

Rushing

- UIW – Ameer King 10 ATT, 54 YDS
- SHSU – Toneil Carter 6 ATT, 26 YDS

Receiving

- UIW – Kam Williams 6 REC, 118 YDS
- SHSU – Nathan Stewart 9 REC, 187 YDS, 3 TD

=== Abilene Christian ===
Abilene Christian Wildcats at Incarnate Word Cardinals

Quarter	1	2	3	4	Total
Wildcats	0	3	14	7	24
Cardinals	7	6	7	11	31

at Gayle and Tom Benson Stadium, San Antonio, Texas

- Date: September 28, 2019
- Game time: 6:00 p.m.
- Game attendance: 2,989
- Referee: Dan Lewis
- TV announcers (UIWtv): Scott Mandziara (play-by-play), Jaime Valdes (analyst), Angela Mitchell (sideline)
- Box Score

Game information

First Quarter

- UIW – 3:05 Keyondrick Philio 5 yard run, Carson Mohr kick
  UIW 7–0 Drive: 19 plays, 91 yards, 7:36

Second Quarter

- UIW – 4:53 Keyondrick Philio 1 yard run, PAT failed
  UIW 13–0 Drive: 13 plays, 56 yards, 4:26
- ACU – 0:06 Blair Zepeda 23 yard field goal
  UIW 13–3 Drive: 14 plays, 54 yards, 4:39

Third Quarter

- UIW – 11:52 Ameer King 1 yard run, Carson Mohr kick
  UIW 20–3 Drive: 5 plays, 39 yards, 1:24
- ACU – 7:23 Josh Fink 15 yard pass from Luke Anthony, Blair Zepeda kick
  UIW 20–10 Drive: 11 plays, 59 yards, 4:24
- ACU – 3:42 Justus Lee 14 yard pass from Luke Anthony, Blair Zepeda kick
  UIW 20–17 Drive: 5 plays, 40 yards, 1:48

Fourth Quarter

- UIW – 14:28 Carson Mohr 36 yard field goal
  UIW 23–17 Drive: 4 plays, −7 yards, 0:38
- UIW – 7:32 Keyondrick Philio 1 yard run, Keyondrick Philio 2-pt rush
  UIW 31–17 Drive: 10 plays, 46 yards, 5:10
- ACU – 2:40 Tracy James 1 yard run, Blair Zepeda kick
  UIW 31–24 Drive: 14 plays, 70 yards, 4:52

Passing

- ACU – Luke Anthony 26/16, 197 YDS, 2 TD, 3 INT
- UIW – Jon Copeland 18/35, 170 YDS, 1 INT

Rushing

- ACU – Tracy James 22 ATT, 97 YDS, 1 TD
- UIW – Ameer King 17 ATT, 61 YDS, 1 TD

Receiving

- ACU – Josh Fink 6 REC, 66 YDS, 1 TD
- UIW – Kam Williams 7 REC, 105 YDS

=== @ Houston Baptist ===
Incarnate Word Cardinals at Houston Baptist Huskies

Quarter	1	2	3	4	Total
Cardinals	14	14	10	0	38
Huskies	7	13	10	6	36

at Husky Stadium, Houston, Texas

- Date: October 5, 2019
- Game time: 6:00 p.m.
- Game weather: Temperature: 90 • Wind: SW 1 mph • Weather: Scattered clouds
- Game attendance: 2,289
- Referee: C. Watson
- TV: ESPN3
- Box Score

Game information

First Quarter

- UIW – 12:02 Lamont Johnson 32 yard pass from Jon Copeland, Carson Mohr kick
  UIW 7–0 Drive: 9 plays, 75 yards, 2:58
- HBU – 11:48 Gamar Girdy Brito 87 yard kickoff return, Gino Garcia kick
  Tied 7–7
- UIW – 8:58 Mark Sullivan 31 yard pass from Jon Copeland, Carson Mohr kick
  UIW 14–7 Drive: 4 plays, 48 yards, 1:08

Second Quarter

- HBU – 13:39 Gino Garcia 49 yard field goal
  UIW 14–10 Drive: 9 plays, 14 yards, 1:51
- UIW – 10:25 Marquez Perez 6 yard run, Carson Mohr kick
  UIW 21–10 Drive: 11 plays, 65 yards, 3:14
- HBU – 4:13 Ben Ratzlaff 8 yard pass from Bailey Zappe, Gino Garcia kick
  UIW 21–17 Drive: 15 plays, 65 yards, 6:08
- UIW – 1:43 Keyondrick Philio 2 yard run, Carson Mohr kick
  UIW 28–17 Drive: 9 plays, 75 yards, 2:24
- HBU – 0:13 Gino Garcia 26 yard field goal
  UIW 28–20 Drive: 10 plays, 43 yards, 1:25

Third Quarter

- HBU – 10:50 Gino Garcia 32 yard field goal
  UIW 28–23 Drive: 11 plays, 43 yards, 4:03
- UIW – 6:55 Kam Williams 4 yard pass from Jon Copeland, Carson Mohr kick
  UIW 35–23 Drive: 10 plays, 75 yards, 3:55
- HBU – 4:58 Jerreth Sterns 6 yard pass from Bailey Zappe, Gino Garcia kick
  UIW 35–30 Drive: 7 plays, 75 yards, 1:50
- UIW – 2:37 Carson Mohr 31 yard field goal
  UIW 38–30 Drive: 7 plays, 61 yards, 2:21

Fourth Quarter

- HBU – 3:14 Gamar Girdy Brito 17 yard pass from Bailey Zappe, Bailey Zappe pass failed
  UIW 38–36 Drive: 12 plays, 63 yards, 3:24

Passing

- UIW – Jon Copeland 33/44, 342 YDS, 3 TD
- HBU – Bailey Zappe 49/69, 390 YDS, 3 TD, 2 INT

Rushing

- UIW – Kevin Brown 11 ATT, 104 YDS
- HBU –Ean Beek 20 ATT, 96 YDS

Receiving

- UIW – Kam Williams 9 REC, 101 YDS, 1 TD
- HBU – Jerreth Sterns 18 REC, 136 YDS, 1 TD

=== @ Southeastern Louisiana ===
Incarnate Word Cardinals at Southeastern Louisiana Lions

Quarter	1	2	3	4	Total
Cardinals	3	14	3	7	27
No. 23 Lions	7	7	0	7	21

at Strawberry Stadium, Hammond, Louisiana

- Date: October 12, 2019
- Game time: 4:00 p.m.
- Game weather: Temperature: 72 • Wind: N 10 mph • Weather: Cloudy
- Game attendance: 6,345
- Referee: Vidal Jones
- TV announcers (ESPN+): John Satori (play-by-play), Richie Solares (analyst)
- Box Score

Game information

First Quarter

- SLU – 10:11 Austin Mitchell 48 yard pass from Chason Virgil, Bryce Broussard kick
  SLU 7–0 Drive: 8 plays, 89 yards, 3:32
- UIW – 0:29 Carson Mohr 25 yard field goal
  SLU 7–3 Drive: 6 plays, 25 yards, 2:09

Second Quarter

- UIW – 14:49 Isaiah Paul 45 yard interception return, Carson Mohr kick
  UIW 10–7
- UIW – 4:09 Brady Rogers 18 yard pass from Jon Copeland, Carson Mohr kick
  UIW 17–7 Drive: 8 plays, 80 yards, 2:55
- SLU – 1:12 Cole Kelley 1 yard run, Bryce Broussard kick
  UIW 17–14 Drive: 6 plays, 51 yards, 2:46

Third Quarter

- UIW – 4:39 Carson Mohr 19 yard field goal
  UIW 20–14 Drive: 9 plays, 62 yards, 4:03

Fourth Quarter

- UIW – 9:23 Lamont Johnson 21 yard pass from Jon Copeland, Carson Mohr kick
  UIW 27–14 Drive: 12 plays, 76 yards, 5:41
- SLU – 5:54 Marcus Cooper 16 yard run, Bryce Broussard kick
  UIW 27–21 Drive: 9 plays, 84 yards, 2:05

Passing

- UIW – Jon Copeland 14/27, 147 YDS, 2 TD
- SLU – Chason Virgil 33/46, 337 YDS, 1 TD, 4 INT

Rushing

- UIW – Ameer King 18 ATT, 94 YDS
- SLU – Marcus Cooper 9 ATT, 59 YDS, 1 TD

Receiving

- UIW – Lamont Johnson 3 REC, 37 YDS, 1 TD
- SLU – Austin Mitchell 4 REC, 87 YDS, 1 TD

=== Lamar ===
Lamar Cardinals at Incarnate Word Cardinals

Quarter	1	2	3	4	Total
Cardinals (LU)	7	0	7	3	17
Cardinals (UIW)	14	14	7	0	35

at Gayle and Tom Benson Stadium, San Antonio, Texas

- Date: October 19, 2019
- Game time: 4:00 p.m.
- Game weather: Temperature: 92 • Wind: 3 mph • Weather: Sunny
- Game attendance: 3,048
- Referee: Dan Lewis
- TV announcers (ESPN3): Ted Emrich (play-by-play), Shea Walker (analyst), Taylor Verrico (sideline)
- Box Score

Game information

First Quarter

- UIW – 13:06 Ameer King 26 yard pass from Jon Copeland, Carson Mohr kick
  UIW 7–0 Drive: 6 plays, 75 yards, 1:54
- LU – 12:25 Jordan Hoy 73 yard run, Bailey Giffen kick
  Tied 7–7 Drive: 2 plays, 75 yards, 0:41
- UIW – 2:30 Brady Rogers 24 yard pass from Jon Copeland, Carson Mohr kick
  UIW 14–7 Drive: 7 plays, 45 yards, 3:28

Second Quarter

- UIW – 9:09 Keyondrick Philio 2 yard run, Carson Mohr kick failed
  UIW 20–7 Drive: 2 plays, 92 yards, 0:59
- UIW – 0:08 Lamont Johnson 32 yard pass from Jon Copeland, Jon Copeland pass to Kam Williams
  UIW 28–7 Drive: 4 plays, 48 yards, 0:29

Third Quarter

- LU – 10:04 Myles Wanza 10 yard run, Bailey Giffen kick
  UIW 28–14 Drive: 5 plays, 30 yards, 2:23
- UIW – 6:59 Mark Sullivan 32 yard pass from Jon Copeland, Carson Mohr kick
  UIW 35–14 Drive: 8 plays, 75 yards, 3:05

Fourth Quarter

- LU – 14:56 Bailey Giffen 28 yard field goal
  UIW 35–17 Drive: 12 plays, 88 yards, 5:34

Passing

- LU – Shane Johnson 9/18, 124 YDS, 1 INT
- UIW – Jon Copeland 24/35, 376 YDS, 4 TD, 1 INT

Rushing

- LU – Myles Wanza 16 ATT, 80 YDS, 1 TD
- UIW – Kevin Brown 13 ATT, 59 YDS

Receiving

- LU – Myles Wanza 5 REC, 68 YDS
- UIW – Ameer King 4 REC, 124 YDS, 1 TD

=== Northwestern State ===
Northwestern State Demons at Incarnate Word Cardinals

Quarter	1	2	3	4	OT	Total
Demons	7	9	7	15	6	44
Cardinals	7	10	14	7	3	41

at Gayle and Tom Benson Stadium, San Antonio, Texas

- Date: October 26, 2019
- Game time: 4:00 p.m.
- Game weather: Temperature: 73 • Wind: SW 8 mph • Weather: Sunny
- Game attendance: 3,373
- Referee: Vidal Jones
- TV announcers (UIWtv): Scott Mandziara (play-by-play), Jaime Valdes (analyst), Angela Mitchell (sideline)
- Box Score

Game information

First Quarter

- NSU – 8:49 Jared West 3 yard run, Rya Gremillion kick
  NSU 7–0 Drive: 11 plays, 55 yards, 5:25
- UIW – 4:40 Jon Copeland 4 yard run, Carson Mohr kick
  Tied 7–7 Drive: 10 plays, 81 yards, 3:58

Second Quarter

- UIW – 13:34 Carson Mohr 46 yard field goal
  UIW 10–7 Drive: 10 plays, 39 yards, 4:32
- UIW – 11:33 Keyondrick Philio 3 yard run, Carson Mohr kick
  UIW 17–7 Drive: 6 plays, 27 yards, 1:56
- NSU – 7:27 Jared West 2 yard run, Rya Gremillion kick failed
  UIW 17–13 Drive: 9 plays, 70 yards, 4:01
- NSU – 0:00 Daniel Justino 29 yard field goal
  UIW 17–16 Drive: 8 plays, 37 yards, 1:01

Third Quarter

- UIW – 13:46 Jerick Pitre 32 yard interception return, Carson Mohr kick
  UIW 24–16
- UIW – 9:23 Mark Sullivan 39 yard pass from Jon Copeland, Carson Mohr kick
  UIW 31–16 Drive: 7 plays, 67 yards, 2:44
- NSU – 6:31 Stadford Anderson 2 yard run, Daniel Justino kick
  UIW 31–23 Drive: 2 plays, 6 yards, 0:21

Fourth Quarter

- NSU – 8:27 Jared West 5 yard run, Daniel Justino kick
  UIW 31–30 Drive: 13 plays, 72 yards, 7:46
- UIW – 2:42 Brady Rogers 8 yard pass from Jon Copeland, Carson Mohr kick
  UIW 38–30 Drive: 12 plays, 82 yards, 5:37
- NSU – 0:19 Tanner Ash 19 yard pass from Shelton Eppler, Akile Davis pass
  Tied 38–38 Drive: 12 plays, 75 yards, 2:23

Overtime

- UIW – 0:00 Carson Mohr 26 yard field goal
  UIW 41–38
- NSU – 0:00 Quan Shorts 1 yard pass from Shelton Eppler
  NSU 44–41

Passing

- NSU – Shelton Eppler 30/40, 259 YDS, 2 TD, 1 INT
- UIW – Jon Copeland 27/36, 275 YDS, 2 TD, 1 INT

Rushing

- NSU – Stadford Anderson 13 ATT, 60 YDS, 1 TD
- UIW – Kevin Brown 21 ATT, 116 YDS

Receiving

- NSU – Quan Shorts 11 REC, 99 YDS, 1 TD
- UIW – C.J. Hardy 4 REC, 84 YDS

=== Nicholls ===
Nicholls Colonels at Incarnate Word Cardinals

Quarter	1	2	3	4	Total
No. 25 Colonels	6	14	0	7	27
Cardinals	6	10	0	7	23

at Gayle and Tom Benson Stadium, San Antonio, Texas

- Date: November 2, 2019
- Game time: 4:00 p.m.
- Game weather: Temperature: 69 • Wind: NE 7 mph • Weather: Mostly sunny
- Game attendance: 3,928
- Referee: Christian Watso
- TV announcers (ESPN3): David Saltzman (play-by-play), Shea Walker (analyst), Taylor Verrico (sideline)
- Box Score

Game information

First Quarter

- UIW – 11:00 Carson Mohr 29 yard field goal
  UIW 3–0 Drive: 13 plays, 73 yards, 4:00
- UIW – 7:25 Carson Mohr 40 yard field goal
  UIW 6–0 Drive: 7 plays, 4 yards, 2:03
- NSU – 4:44 Julien Gums 9 yard run, Gunnar Jones kick failed
  Tied 6–6 Drive: 9 plays, 65 yards, 2:35

Second Quarter

- UIW – 13:40 Ameer King 1 yard pass from Jon Copeland, Carson Mohr kick
  UIW 13–6 Drive: 6 plays, 61 yards, 2:21
- NSU – 12:26 KJ Franklin 32 yard pass from Chase Fourcade, Gunnar Jones kick
  Tied 13–13 Drive: 3 plays, 64 yards, 1:08
- UIW – 6:37 Carson Mohr 27 yard field goal
  UIW 16–13 Drive: 8 plays, 60 yards, 2:25
- NSU – 1:24 Chase Fourcade 64 yard run, Gunnar Jones kick
  NSU 20–16 Drive: 8 plays, 89 yards, 2:41

Fourth Quarter

- UIW – 7:49 Kevin Brown 1 yard run, Carson Mohr kick
  UIW 23–20 Drive: 6 plays, 74 yards, 1:50
- NSU – 3:27 Julien Gums 1 yard run, Gunnar Jones kick
  NSU 27–23 Drive: 9 plays, 74 yards, 4:16

Passing

- NSU – Chase Fourcade 10/21, 150 YDS, 1 TD
- UIW – Jon Copeland 34/55, 381 YDS, 1 TD

Rushing

- NSU – Julien Gums 23 ATT, 178 YDS, 2 TD
- UIW – Kevin Brown 9 ATT, 59 YDS, 1 TD

Receiving

- NSU – KJ Franklin 3 REC, 81 YDS, 1 TD
- UIW – CJ Hardy 7 REC, 102 YDS

=== @ Stephen F. Austin ===
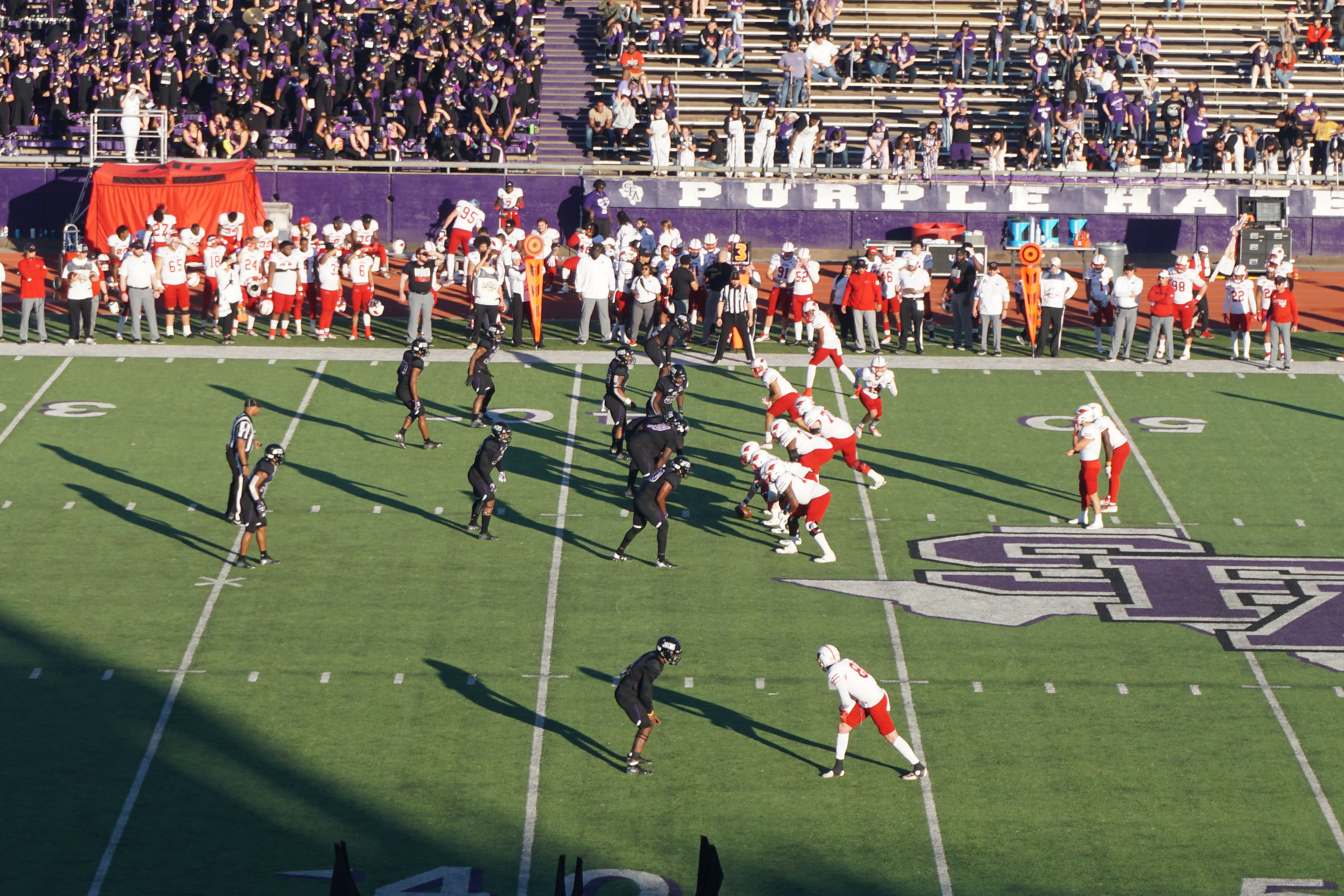
Incarnate Word in action at Stephen F. Austin

Incarnate Word Cardinals at Stephen F. Austin Lumberjacks

Quarter	1	2	3	4	Total
Cardinals	0	21	0	3	24
Lumberjacks	14	0	7	10	31

at Homer Bryce Stadium, Nacogdoches, Texas

- Date: November 9, 2019
- Game time: 3:00 p.m.
- Game attendance: 6,321
- Referee: Dan Lewis
- TV announcers (ESPN3): Luke Hamilton (play-by-play), John Wilkowski (analyst)
- Box Score

Game information

First Quarter

- SFA – 12:10 Thomas Hutchings 2 yard run, Storm Ruiz kick
  SFA 7–0 Drive: 6 plays, 34 yards, 2:16
- SFA – 0:09 Cam Arnold 20 yard run, Storm Ruiz kick
  SFA 14–0 Drive: 4 plays, 29 yards, 2:02

Second Quarter

- UIW – 12:46 Andy Jennings 0 yard fumble recovery, Carson Mohr kick
  SFA 14–7
- UIW – 8:18 Jon Copeland 1 yard run, Carson Mohr kick
  Tied 14–14 Drive: 9 plays, 61 yards, 2:56
- UIW – 0:30 Jaelin Campbell 7 yard pass from Jon Copeland, Carson Mohr kick
  UIW 21–14 Drive: 8 plays, 87 yards, 1:13

Third Quarter

- SFA – 11:26 Thomas Hutchings 21 yard run, Storm Ruiz kick
  Tied 21–21 Drive: 9 plays, 73 yards, 3:24

Fourth Quarter

- SFA – 13:26 Xavier Gipson 70 yard pass from Cam Arnold, Storm Ruiz kick
  SFA 28–21 Drive: 2 plays, 70 yards, 0:14
- SFA – 7:27 Storm Ruiz 38 yard field goal
  SFA 31–21 Drive: 9 plays, 35 yards, 5:04
- UIW – 5:19 Carson Mohr 32 yard field goal
  SFA 31–24 Drive: 10 plays, 48 yards, 2:00

Passing

- UIW – Jon Copeland 35/62, 349 YDS, 1 TD, 1 INT
- SFA – Cam Arnold 15/22, 201 YDS, 1 TD, 1 INT

Rushing

- UIW – Kevin Brown 8 ATT, 44 YDS
- SFA – Thomas Hutchings 20 ATT, 74 YDS, 2 TD

Receiving

- UIW – Kamden Perry 11 REC, 105 YDS
- SFA – Xavier Gipson 4 REC, 132 YDS, 1 TD

=== @ New Mexico State ===
Incarnate Word Cardinals at New Mexico State Aggies

Quarter	1	2	3	4	Total
Cardinals	0	7	7	14	28
Aggies	14	10	3	14	41

at Aggie Memorial Stadium, Las Cruces, New Mexico

- Date: November 16, 2019
- Game time: 1:00 p.m.
- Game attendance: 25,804
- Referee: Scott Campbell
- TV announcers (FloSports): Adam Young (play-by-play), Danny Knee (analyst)
- Box Score

Game information

First Quarter

- NMSU – 4:38 Tony Nicholson 34 yard pass from Josh Adkins, Dylan Brown kick
  NMSU 7–0 Drive: 6 plays, 58 yards, 2:27
- NMSU – 1:23 Tony Nicholson 42 yard pass from Josh Adkins, Dylan Brown kick
  NMSU 14–0 Drive: 3 plays, 44 yards, 0:43

Second Quarter

- NMSU – 14:42 OJ Clark 77 yard punt return, Dylan Brown kick
  NMSU 21–0
- UIW – 9:31 Keyondrick Philio 1 yard run, Carson Mohr kick
  NMSU 21–7 Drive: 4 plays, 50 yards, 1:17
- NMSU – 4:40 Dylan Brown 30 yard field goal
  NMSU 24–7 Drive: 9 plays, 31 yards, 3:21

Third Quarter

- NMSU – 4:46 Dylan Brown 28 yard field goal
  NMSU 27–7 Drive: 10 plays, 44 yards, 3:44
- UIW – 0:24 Ameer King 11 yard pass from Jon Copeland, Carson Mohr kick
  NMSU 27–14 Drive: 13 plays, 75 yards, 4:22

Fourth Quarter

- NMSU – 13:53 Jason Huntley 1 yard run, Dylan Brown kick
  NMSU 34–14 Drive: 4 plays, 47 yards, 1:23
- UIW – 13:41 Ce'Cori Tolds 100 yard kickoff return, Carson Mohr kick
  NMSU 34–21
- NMSU – 3:49 C. Gibson 2 yard run, Dylan Brown kick
  NMSU 41–21 Drive: 11 plays, 83 yards, 5:29
- UIW – 0:57 Jon Copeland 1 yard run, Carson Mohr kick
  NMSU 41–28 Drive: 12 plays, 75 yards, 2:52

Passing

- UIW – Jon Copeland 18/40, 181 YDS, 1 TD, 2 INT
- NMST – Josh Adkins 28/38, 316 YDS, 2 TD

Rushing

- UIW – Kevin Brown 9 ATT, 31 YDS
- NMST – Jason Huntley 25 ATT, 174 YDS, 1 TD

Receiving

- UIW – Mark Sullivan 3 REC, 48 YDS
- NMST – Tony Nicholson 5 REC, 98 YDS, 2 TD

=== Central Arkansas ===
Central Arkansas Bears at Incarnate Word Cardinals

Quarter	1	2	3	4	Total
No. 11 Bears	3	21	7	21	52
Cardinals	0	14	14	7	35

at Gayle and Tom Benson Stadium, San Antonio, Texas

- Date: November 22, 2019
- Game time: 6:30 p.m.
- Game weather: Temperature: 61 • Wind: N 9 mph • Weather: Clear
- Game attendance: 2,668
- Referee: Christian Watso
- TV announcers (ESPN+): David Saltzman (play-by-play), Taylor McHargue (analyst), Lainie Fritz (sideline)
- Box Score

Game information

First Quarter

- UCA – 5:50 Hayden Ray 42 yard field goal
  UCA 3–0 Drive: 9 plays, 45 yards, 4:28

Second Quarter

- UCA – 14:03 Jarrod Barnes 4 yard pass from Breylin Smith, Hayden Ray kick
  UCA 10–0 Drive: 12 plays, 75 yards, 5:57
- UIW – 12:27 Jaelin Campbell 21 yard pass from Jon Copeland, Carson Mohr kick
  UCA 10–7 Drive: 4 plays, 81 yards, 1:25
- UCA – 5:18 Joe Hampton 9 yard pass from Breylin Smith, Hayden Ray kick
  UCA 17–7 Drive: 12 plays, 77 yards, 4:57
- UCA – 0:57 Tyler Hudson 14 yard pass from Breylin Smith, Hayden Ray kick
  UCA 24–7 Drive: 5 plays, 66 yards, 0:46
- UIW – 0:43 Ce'Cori Tolds 94 yard kickoff return, Carson Mohr kick
  UCA 24–14

Third Quarter

- UCA – 12:21 Tyler Hudson 44 yard pass from Breylin Smith, Hayden Ray kick
  UCA 31–14 Drive: 3 plays, 57 yards, 1:16
- UIW – 8:16 Colby Anthony 3 yard pass from Jon Copeland, Carson Mohr kick
  UCA 31–21 Drive: 11 plays, 90 yards, 3:58
- UIW – 3:52 Jon Copeland 8 yard run, Carson Mohr kick
  UCA 31–28 Drive: 8 plays, 82 yards, 2:42

Fourth Quarter

- UCA – 12:21 Carlos Blackman 18 yard run, Hayden Ray kick
  UCA 38–28 Drive: 7 plays, 58 yards, 2:39
- UCA – 5:30 Tyler Hudson 27 yard pass from Breylin Smith, Hayden Ray kick
  UCA 45–28 Drive: 11 plays, 66 yards, 6:27
- UIW – 2:25 Kevin Brown 4 yard run, Carson Mohr kick
  UCA 45–35 Drive: 12 plays, 75 yards, 3:05
- UCA – 2:18 Carlos Blackman 46 yard kickoff return, Hayden Ray kick
  UCA 52–35

Passing

- UCA – Breylin Smith 25/38, 296 YDS, 5 TD
- UIW – Jon Copeland 32/55, 338 YDS, 2 TD

Rushing

- UCA – Carlos Blackman 18 ATT, 80 YDS, 1 TD
- UIW – Kevin Brown 14 ATT, 85 YDS, 1 TD

Receiving

- UCA – Tyler Hudson 9 REC, 161 YDS, 3 TD
- UIW – Brady Rogers 7 REC, 68 YDS

== Rankings ==
Ranking movements Legend: ██ Increase in ranking ██ Decrease in ranking — = Not ranked RV = Received votes
	Week														
Poll	Pre	1	2	3	4	5	6	7	8	9	10	11	12	13	Final
STATS FCS	RV	RV	—	RV	—	—	RV	RV	RV	RV	—	—	—	—	
Coaches	RV	RV	RV	—	—	—	—	25	20	RV	—	—	—	—	
