= 2019 Stephen F. Austin Lumberjacks football team =

American college football season

2019 Stephen F. Austin Lumberjacks football
- Conference: Southland Conference
- Record: 3–9 (3–6 Southland)
- Head coach: Colby Carthel (1st season)
- Offensive coordinator: Matt Storm (1st season)
- Offensive scheme: Spread
- Defensive coordinator: Scott Power (1st season)
- Base defense: 4–3
- Home stadium: Homer Bryce Stadium

2019 Southland Conference football standings
	Conf.			Overall
Team	W		L	W		L
No. 14 Nicholls +^	7	–	2	8	–	4
No. 11 Central Arkansas +^	7	–	2	9	–	3
No. 19 Southeastern Louisiana ^	6	–	3	8	–	5
Sam Houston State	6	–	3	7	–	5
McNeese State	5	–	4	7	–	5
Incarnate Word	4	–	5	5	–	7
Abilene Christian	4	–	5	5	–	7
Northwestern State	3	–	6	3	–	9
Stephen F. Austin	3	–	6	3	–	9
Houston Baptist	2	–	6	5	–	7
Lamar	2	–	7	4	–	8
+ – Conference co-champions; ^ – FCS playoff participant; Rankings from STATS poll

The 2019 Stephen F. Austin football team represented Stephen F. Austin State University in the 2019 NCAA Division I FCS football season as a member of the Southland Conference. The Lumberjacks wereled by first-year head coach Colby Carthel and played their home games at Homer Bryce Stadium.

== Preseason ==
=== Preseason poll ===
The Southland Conference released their preseason poll on July 18, 2019. The Lumberjacks were picked to finish in ninth place.

=== Preseason All–Southland Teams ===
The Lumberjacks placed three players on the preseason all–Southland teams.

Offense

1st team

Storm Ruiz – K

2nd team

Tamrick Pace – WR

Defense

2nd team

Alize Ward – DB

== Schedule ==
Date	Time	Opponent	Site	TV	Result	Attendance
August 31	6:00 p.m.	at Baylor*	McLane Stadium; Waco, TX	ESPN+	L 17–56	43,013
September 7	6:00 p.m.	Tarleton State*	Homer Bryce Stadium; Nacogdoches, TX	ESPN3	L 26–37	8,334
September 14	7:00 p.m.	at Southern Utah*	Eccles Coliseum; Cedar City, UT	Pluto TV	L 38–45 ^{OT}	5,568
September 21	6:00 p.m.	No. 13 Nicholls	Homer Bryce Stadium; Nacogdoches, TX	ESPN+	L 30–48	10,304
September 28	6:00 p.m.	at Lamar	Provost Umphrey Stadium; Beaumont, TX	ESPN+	W 24–17	9,218
October 5	3:00 p.m.	vs. Sam Houston State	NRG Stadium; Houston, TX (Battle of the Piney Woods)	ESPN+	L 20–31	24,008
October 19	3:00 p.m.	at Abilene Christian	Wildcat Stadium; Abilene, TX	ESPN+	L 24–31 ^{2OT}	11,096
October 26	3:00 p.m.	McNeese State^{†}	Homer Bryce Stadium; Nacogdoches, TX	ESPN+	L 10–33	8,335
November 2	4:00 p.m.	at Southeastern Louisiana	Strawberry Stadium; Hammond, LA	Southeastern Sports Network	L 30–47	5,127
November 9	3:00 p.m.	Incarnate Word	Homer Bryce Stadium; Nacogdoches, TX	ESPN3	W 31–24	6,321
November 16	3:00 p.m.	at No. 14 Central Arkansas	Estes Stadium; Conway, AR	ESPN+	L 7–30	5,527
November 21	6:00 p.m.	at Northwestern State	Harry Turpin Stadium; Natchitoches, LA (Battle for Chief Caddo)	DemonTV	W 32–20	5,822
*Non-conference game; ^{†}Homecoming; Rankings from STATS Poll released prior to the game; All times are in Central time

== Game summaries ==
=== At Baylor ===
	1	2	3	4	Total
Lumberjacks	7	0	0	10	17
Bears	14	21	14	7	56

=== Tarleton State ===
	1	2	3	4	Total
Texans	14	7	6	10	37
Lumberjacks	14	6	6	0	26

=== At Southern Utah ===
	1	2	3	4	OT	Total
Lumberjacks	0	17	7	14	0	38
Thunderbirds	10	7	7	14	7	45

=== Nicholls ===
	1	2	3	4	Total
No. 13 Colonels	7	21	7	14	49
Lumberjacks	7	16	0	7	30

=== At Lamar ===
	1	2	3	4	Total
Lumberjacks	3	10	0	11	24
Cardinals	3	0	0	14	17

=== Vs. Sam Houston State ===
	1	2	3	4	Total
Bearkats	0	14	0	17	31
Lumberjacks	7	3	0	10	20

=== At Abilene Christian ===
	1	2	3	4	OT	2OT	Total
Lumberjacks	7	7	0	10	0	0	24
Wildcats	0	14	10	0	0	7	31

=== McNeese State ===
	1	2	3	4	Total
Cowboys	3	7	3	20	33
Lumberjacks	7	0	3	0	10

=== At Southeastern Louisiana ===
	1	2	3	4	Total
Lumberjacks	0	10	7	13	30
Lions	13	6	14	14	47

=== Incarnate Word ===
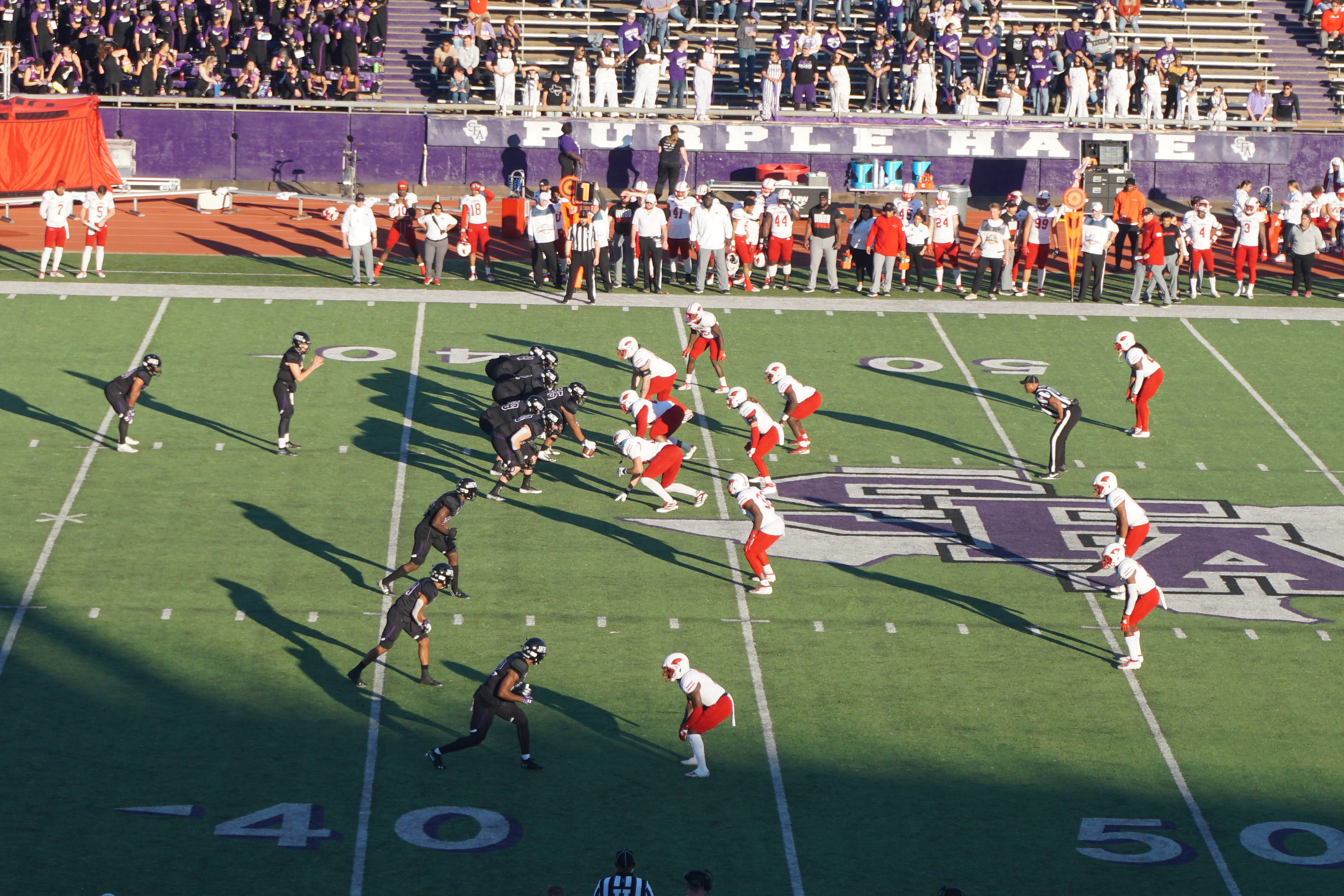
Stephen F. Austin in action against Incarnate Word

	1	2	3	4	Total
Cardinals	0	21	0	3	24
Lumberjacks	14	0	7	10	31

=== At Central Arkansas ===
	1	2	3	4	Total
Lumberjacks	0	7	0	0	7
No. 14 Bears	3	10	10	7	30

=== At Northwestern State ===
	1	2	3	4	Total
Lumberjacks	13	14	5	0	32
Demons	0	7	7	6	20
