= 2019 Central Arkansas Bears football team =

American college football season

2019 Central Arkansas Bears football

Southland Conference co-champion

NCAA Division I Second Round, L 14–24 vs. Illinois State
- Conference: Southland Conference

Ranking
- STATS: No. 11
- FCS Coaches: No. 11
- Record: 9–4 (7–2 Southland)
- Head coach: Nathan Brown (2nd season)
- Offensive coordinator: Ken Collums (2nd season)
- Offensive scheme: Spread
- Defensive coordinator: Chad Williams (1st season)
- Base defense: 4–2–5
- Home stadium: Estes Stadium

2019 Southland Conference football standings
	Conf.			Overall
Team	W		L	W		L
No. 14 Nicholls +^	7	–	2	8	–	4
No. 11 Central Arkansas +^	7	–	2	9	–	3
No. 19 Southeastern Louisiana ^	6	–	3	8	–	5
Sam Houston State	6	–	3	7	–	5
McNeese State	5	–	4	7	–	5
Incarnate Word	4	–	5	5	–	7
Abilene Christian	4	–	5	5	–	7
Northwestern State	3	–	6	3	–	9
Stephen F. Austin	3	–	6	3	–	9
Houston Baptist	2	–	6	5	–	7
Lamar	2	–	7	4	–	8
+ – Conference co-champions; ^ – FCS playoff participant; Rankings from STATS poll

The 2019 Central Arkansas Bears football team represented the University of Central Arkansas in the 2019 NCAA Division I FCS football season as a member of the Southland Conference. The Bears were led by second-year head coach Nathan Brown and played their home games at Estes Stadium. UCA finished the regular season 9–3 overall, 7–2 in Southland Conference play, earning a share of the 2019 Southland Conference championship, and a first round bye in the FCS playoffs with a #8 seeding.

== Preseason ==
=== Preseason poll ===
The Southland Conference released their preseason poll on July 18, 2019. The Bears were picked to finish in second place.

=== Preseason All–Southland Teams ===
The Bears placed seven players on the preseason all–Southland teams.

Offense

1st team

Carlos Blackman – RB

Hunter Watts – OL

2nd team

Toby Sanderson – OL

Defense

1st team

Chris Terrell – DL

Juan Jackson – DB

2nd team

Jackie Harvell – DB

Robert Rochell – DB

== Schedule ==
Date	Time	Opponent	Rank	Site	TV	Result	Attendance
August 29	6:30 p.m.	at Western Kentucky*		Houchens Industries–L. T. Smith Stadium; Bowling Green, KY	ESPN+	W 35–28	17,120
September 7	2:00 p.m.	at Austin Peay*	No. 20	Fortera Stadium; Clarksville, TN	ESPN+	W 24–16	7,523
September 14	6:00 p.m.	Abilene Christian	No. 14	Estes Stadium; Conway, AR	ESPN3	W 31–30	10,123
September 21	10:59 p.m.	at Hawaii*	No. 14	Aloha Stadium; Halawa, HI	Spectrum Sports	L 16–35	23,465
October 5	3:00 p.m.	at No. 16 Nicholls	No. 11	John L. Guidry Stadium; Thibodaux, LA	YouTube	L 14–34	7,021
October 12	6:00 p.m.	McNeese State	No. 16	Estes Stadium; Conway, AR (Red Beans and Rice Bowl)	ESPN+	W 40–31	11,237
October 19	6:00 p.m.	at Northwestern State	No. 13	Harry Turpin Stadium; Natchitoches, LA	CST, ESPN+	W 31–30	7,584
October 26	6:00 p.m.	No. 21 Sam Houston State^{†}	No. 12	Estes Stadium; Conway, AR	ESPN+	W 29–25	9,363
November 2	3:00 p.m.	at Lamar	No. 10	Provost Umphrey Stadium; Beaumont, TX	ESPN+	W 45–17	5,913
November 9	3:00 p.m.	Southeastern Louisiana	No. 7	Estes Stadium; Conway, AR	ESPN+	L 0–34	6,275
November 16	3:00 p.m.	Stephen F. Austin	No. 14	Estes Stadium; Conway, AR	ESPN+	W 30–7	5,527
November 22	6:30 p.m.	at Incarnate Word	No. 11	Gayle and Tom Benson Stadium; San Antonio, TX	ESPN+	W 52–35	2,668
December 7	2:00 p.m.	No. 13 Illinois State*	No. 9	Estes Stadium; Conway, AR (NCAA Division I Second Round)	ESPN3	L 14–24	5,127
*Non-conference game; ^{†}Homecoming; Rankings from STATS Poll released prior to the game; All times are in Central time

== Game summaries ==
=== At Western Kentucky ===
	1	2	3	4	Total
Bears	0	14	0	21	35
Hilltoppers	14	7	7	0	28

=== At Austin Peay ===
	1	2	3	4	Total
No. 20 Bears	0	3	7	14	24
Governors	0	0	13	3	16

=== Abilene Christian ===
	1	2	3	4	Total
Wildcats	7	3	7	13	30
No. 14 Bears	3	6	0	22	31

=== At Hawaii ===
	1	2	3	4	Total
No. 14 Bears	0	9	0	7	16
Rainbow Warriors	14	14	0	7	35

=== At Nicholls ===
	1	2	3	4	Total
No. 11 Bears	0	0	7	7	14
No. 16 Colonels	6	14	7	7	34

=== McNeese State ===
	1	2	3	4	Total
Cowboys	10	14	0	7	31
No. 16 Bears	10	10	14	6	40

=== At Northwestern State ===
	1	2	3	4	Total
No. 13 Bears	7	7	10	7	31
Demons	14	10	0	6	30

=== Sam Houston State ===
	1	2	3	4	Total
No. 21 Bearkats	7	9	6	3	25
No. 12 Bears	0	0	14	15	29

=== At Lamar ===
	1	2	3	4	Total
No. 10 Bears	14	10	21	0	45
Cardinals	0	10	0	7	17

=== Southeastern Louisiana ===
	1	2	3	4	Total
Lions	7	14	6	7	34
No. 7 Bears	0	0	0	0	0

=== Stephen F. Austin ===
	1	2	3	4	Total
Lumberjacks	0	7	0	0	7
No. 14 Bears	3	10	10	7	30

=== At Incarnate Word ===
	1	2	3	4	Total
No. 11 Bears	3	21	7	21	52
Cardinals	0	14	14	7	35

== FCS Playoffs ==
The Bears enter the postseason tournament as the number eight seed, with a first-round bye. They will play Illinois State at Estes Stadium in Conway on December 7.

=== Illinois State–Second Round ===
	1	2	3	4	Total
No. 13 Redbirds	0	21	0	3	24
No. 9 Bears	0	7	0	7	14

== Ranking movements ==
Ranking movements Legend: ██ Increase in ranking ██ Decrease in ranking RV = Received votes т = Tied with team above or below
	Week														
Poll	Pre	1	2	3	4	5	6	7	8	9	10	11	12	13	Final
STATS FCS	RV	20	14	14	15	11	16	13	12	10	7	14	11	9	
Coaches	25	18	14	12	14	10-T	16	13	10	9	6	13	11	7	
