= 2019 Abilene Christian Wildcats football team =

American college football season

2019 Abilene Christian Wildcats football
- Conference: Southland Conference
- Record: 5–7 (4–5 Southland)
- Head coach: Adam Dorrel (3rd season)
- Offensive coordinator: Josh Lamberson (3rd season)
- Offensive scheme: Single set back
- Defensive coordinator: Clint Brown (1st season)
- Base defense: 4–3
- Home stadium: Anthony Field at Wildcat Stadium

2019 Southland Conference football standings
	Conf.			Overall
Team	W		L	W		L
No. 14 Nicholls +^	7	–	2	8	–	4
No. 11 Central Arkansas +^	7	–	2	9	–	3
No. 19 Southeastern Louisiana ^	6	–	3	8	–	5
Sam Houston State	6	–	3	7	–	5
McNeese State	5	–	4	7	–	5
Incarnate Word	4	–	5	5	–	7
Abilene Christian	4	–	5	5	–	7
Northwestern State	3	–	6	3	–	9
Stephen F. Austin	3	–	6	3	–	9
Houston Baptist	2	–	6	5	–	7
Lamar	2	–	7	4	–	8
+ – Conference co-champions; ^ – FCS playoff participant; Rankings from STATS poll

The 2019 Abilene Christian Wildcats football team represented Abilene Christian University in the 2019 NCAA Division I FCS football season as a member of the Southland Conference. The Wildcats were led by third-year head coach Adam Dorrel and played their home games at Anthony Field at Wildcat Stadium.

== Preseason ==
=== Preseason poll ===
The Southland Conference released their preseason poll on July 18, 2019. The Wildcats were picked to finish in seventh place.

=== Preseason All–Southland Teams ===
The Wildcats placed five players on the preseason all–Southland teams.

Offense

1st team

Billy McCrary – RB

2nd team

Josh Fink – WR

Kade Parmelly – OL

Defense

1st team

Jeremiah Chambers – LB

2nd team

Bolu Onifade – DB

== Schedule ==
Date	Time	Opponent	Site	TV	Result	Attendance
August 31	6:30 p.m.	at North Texas*	Apogee Stadium; Denton, TX	ESPN+	L 31–51	23,057
September 7	6:00 p.m.	Arizona Christian*	Wildcat Stadium; Abilene, TX	ESPN+	W 66–14	7,463
September 14	6:00 p.m.	at No. 14 Central Arkansas	Estes Stadium; Conway, AR	ESPN3	L 30–31	10,123
September 21	6:00 p.m.	McNeese State	Wildcat Stadium; Abilene, TX	ESPN+	W 17–10	9,624
September 28	6:00 p.m.	at Incarnate Word	Gayle and Tom Benson Stadium; San Antonio, TX	UIWtv	L 24–31	2,989
October 5	6:00 p.m.	at Lamar	Provost Umphrey Stadium; Beaumont, TX	ESPN3	L 24–27	6,016
October 12	6:00 p.m.	Houston Baptist	Wildcat Stadium; Abilene, TX	ESPN3	W 45–20	7,636
October 19	3:00 p.m.	Stephen F. Austin^{†}	Wildcat Stadium; Abilene, TX	ESPN+	W 31–24 ^{2OT}	11,096
October 26	3:00 p.m.	at No. 15 Nicholls	John L. Guidry Stadium; Thibodaux, LA	CST/ESPN+	W 37–31 ^{OT}	5,012
November 9	3:00 p.m.	Sam Houston State	Wildcat Stadium; Abilene, TX	ESPN+	L 10–24	6,491
November 16	1:00 p.m.	No. 23 Southeastern Louisiana	Wildcat Stadium; Abilene, TX	ESPN+	L 14–35	4,981
November 23	6:30 p.m	at Mississippi State*	Davis Wade Stadium; Starkville, MS	SECN	L 7–45	54,683
*Non-conference game; ^{†}Homecoming; Rankings from STATS Poll released prior to the game; All times are in Central time

== Game summaries ==
=== At North Texas ===
	1	2	3	4	Total
Wildcats	0	10	7	14	31
Mean Green	17	21	10	3	51

=== Arizona Christian ===
	1	2	3	4	Total
Firestorm	0	0	7	7	14
Wildcats	14	31	7	14	66

=== At Central Arkansas ===
	1	2	3	4	Total
Wildcats	7	3	7	13	30
No. 14 Bears	3	6	0	22	31

=== McNeese State ===
	1	2	3	4	Total
Cowboys	3	0	0	7	10
Wildcats	3	7	0	7	17

=== At Incarnate Word ===
	1	2	3	4	Total
Wildcats	0	3	14	7	24
Cardinals	7	6	7	11	31

=== At Lamar ===
	1	2	3	4	Total
Wildcats	0	13	11	0	24
Cardinals	7	3	7	10	27

=== Houston Baptist ===
	1	2	3	4	Total
Huskies	0	6	14	0	20
Wildcats	14	7	17	7	45

=== Stephen F. Austin ===
	1	2	3	4	OT	2OT	Total
Lumberjacks	7	7	0	10	0	0	24
Wildcats	0	14	10	0	0	7	31

=== At Nicholls ===
	1	2	3	4	OT	Total
Wildcats	0	17	14	0	6	37
No. 15 Colonels	7	7	7	10	0	31

=== Sam Houston State ===
	1	2	3	4	Total
Bearkats	0	14	10	0	24
Wildcats	10	0	0	0	10

=== Southeastern Louisiana ===
	1	2	3	4	Total
No. 23 Lions	14	21	0	0	35
Wildcats	0	7	0	7	14

=== At Mississippi State ===
	1	2	3	4	Total
Wildcats	0	7	0	0	7
Bulldogs	7	14	7	17	45
