= 2019 Texas Southern Tigers football team =

American college football season

2019 Texas Southern Tigers football
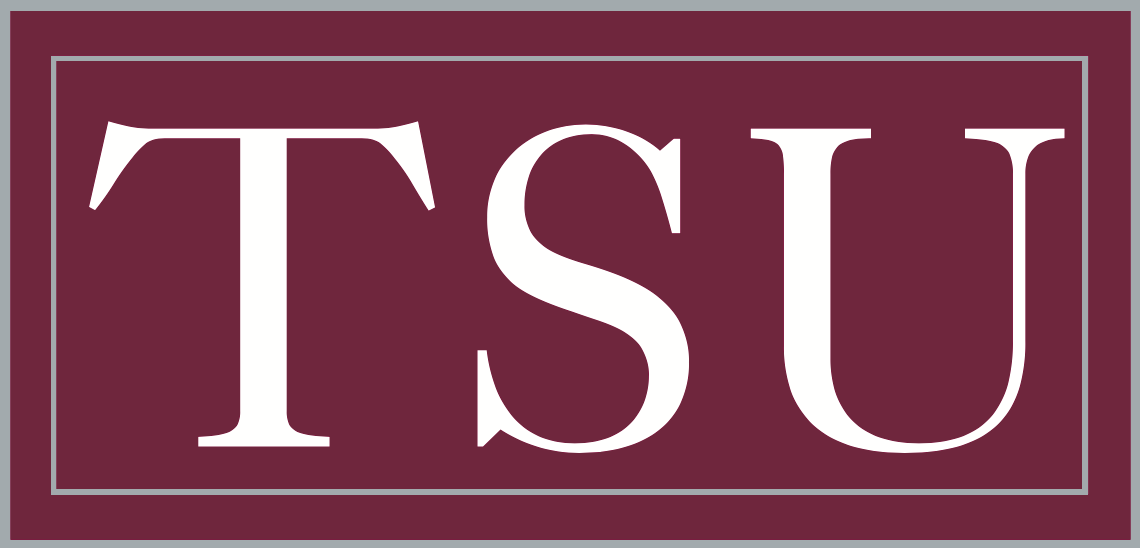
- Conference: Southwestern Athletic Conference
- West Division
- Record: 0–11 (0–7 SWAC)
- Head coach: Clarence McKinney (1st season)
- Offensive coordinator: David Marsh (1st season)
- Defensive coordinator: Jeffery Caesar (1st season)
- Home stadium: BBVA Compass Stadium

2019 Southwestern Athletic Conference football standings
	Conf.			Overall
Team	W		L	W		L
East Division
Alcorn State x$	6	–	1	9	–	4
Alabama A&M	4	–	3	7	–	5
Alabama State	4	–	3	5	–	6
Jackson State	3	–	4	4	–	8
Mississippi Valley State	1	–	6	2	–	9
West Division
Southern x	6	–	1	8	–	5
Prairie View A&M	4	–	3	6	–	5
Grambling State	4	–	3	6	–	5
Arkansas–Pine Bluff	3	–	4	6	–	5
Texas Southern	0	–	7	0	–	11
Championship: Alcorn State 39, Southern 24
$ – Conference champion; x – Division champion/co-champions

The 2019 Texas Southern Tigers football team represented Texas Southern University a member of the West Division of the Southwestern Athletic Conference (SWAC) during the 2019 NCAA Division I FCS football season. Led first-year head coach Clarence McKinney, the Tigers compiled an overall record of 0–11 with a mark of 0–7 in conference play, placing last out of five teams in the SWAC's West Division. Texas Southern played home games at BBVA Compass Stadium in Houston.

== Schedule ==
Date	Time	Opponent	Site	TV	Result	Attendance
August 31	7:00 p.m.	Prairie View A&M	BBVA Compass Stadium; Houston, TX (Labor Day Classic)	ESPN3	L 23–44	16,407
September 7	6:00 p.m.	at Incarnate Word*	Gayle and Tom Benson Stadium; San Antonio, TX	ESPN+	L 44–63	3,637
September 14	7:30 p.m.	at Louisiana*	Cajun Field; Lafayette, LA	ESPN3	L 6–77	18,183
September 28	6:00 p.m.	at Houston Baptist*	Husky Stadium; Houston, TX	ESPN3	L 31–68	3,215
October 5	2:00 p.m.	at Alabama A&M	Louis Crews Stadium; Huntsville, AL	YouTube	L 28–35 ^{OT}	14,626
October 12	2:00 p.m.	Missouri S&T*^{†}	Alexander Durley Sports Complex; Houston, TX		L 20–23	8,300
October 19	2:00 p.m.	vs. Southern	Cotton Bowl; Dallas, TX (State Fair Showdown)		L 21–28	5,136
October 26	1:00 p.m.	at Mississippi Valley State	Rice–Totten Stadium; Itta Bena, MS	YouTube	L 14–35	2,679
November 2	2:00 p.m.	at Grambling State	Eddie Robinson Stadium; Grambling, LA	YouTube	L 20–55	14,562
November 9	2:00 p.m.	Alabama State	BBVA Stadium; Houston, TX	AT&T SportsNet Southwest	L 21–27	2,422
November 23	1:00 p.m.	at Arkansas–Pine Bluff	Simmons Bank Field; Pine Bluff, AR	Golden Lions All-Access	L 13–45	5,329
*Non-conference game; ^{†}Homecoming; All times are in Central time

== Preseason ==
=== Preseason polls ===
The SWAC released their preseason poll on July 16, 2019. The Tigers were picked to finish in fourth place in the West Division.

=== Preseason all–SWAC teams ===
The Tigers placed two players on the preseason all–SWAC teams.

Offense

2nd team

Tren'Davian Dixon – WR

Defense

2nd team

Julian Marcantel – LB

== Game summaries ==
=== Prairie View A&M ===
Prairie View A&M at Texas Southern – Game summary

Quarter	1	2	3	4	Total
Panthers	6	17	14	7	44
Tigers	13	0	10	0	23

at BBVA Stadium, Houston, TX

- Date: August 31
- Game time: 5:30 p.m. CDT
- Game weather: 90 °F (32 °C); humid
- Game attendance: 16,407
- Referee: Marty Adams
- TV: ESPNU

Game information

First quarter

- (08:16) TXSO FG – Richard Garcia III 33-yard field goal
  Texas Southern 3–0; Drive: 5 plays, 14 yards, 1:44
- (06:14) PVAMU TD – Caleb Broach 1-yard rush, Zach Elder PAT blocked
  Prairie View A&M 6–3; Drive: 6 plays, 71 yards, 1:55
- (02:09) TXSO FG – Richard Garcia III 28-yard field goal
  Tied 6–6; Drive: 15 plays, 60 yards, 4:05
- (00:13) TXSO TD – Tren'Davian Dickson 12-yard pass from De'Andre Johnson, Richard Garcia III kick
  Texas Southern 13–6; Drive: 3 plays, 43 yards, 0:50

Second quarter

- (09:18) PVAMU TD – Dawonya Tucker 17-yard rush, Zach Elder kick
  Tied 13–13; Drive: 9 plays, 73 yards, 3:11
- (03:19) PVAMU TD – Dawonya Tucker 66-yard rush, Zach Elder kick
  Prairie View A&M 20–13; Drive: 2 plays, 75 yards, 0:34
- (00:00) PVAMU FG – Zach Elder 23-yard field goal
  Prairie View A&M 23–13; Drive: 7 plays, 27 yards, 2:30

Third quarter

- (09:41) PVAMU TD – Kalen Riles 10-yard pass from Jalen Morton, Zach Elder kick
  Prairie View A&M 30–13; Drive: 14 plays, 65 yards, 5:19
- (02:37) TXSO FG – Richard Garcia III 21-yard field goal
  Prairie View A&M 30–16; Drive: 11 plays, 37 yards, 3:34
- (01:48) PVAMU TD – Tony Mullins 48-yard pass from Jalen Morton, Zach Elder kick
  Prairie View A&M 37–16; Drive: 2 plays, 51 yards, 0:51
- (00:15) TXSO TD – Chris Long 40-yard pass from DeAndre Johnson, Richard Garcia III kick
  Prairie View A&M 37–23; Drive: 5 plays, 68 yards, 1:26

Fourth quarter

- (14:50) PVAU TD – Dawonya Tucker 58-yard rush, Zach Elder kick
  Prairie View A&M 44–23; Drive: 3 plays, 72 yards, 0:25

Top passers

- PVAMU – Jalen Morton – 24/42, 350 yards, 2 TD, INT
- TXSO – De'Andre Johnson – 22/37, 259 yards, 2 TD, INT

Top rushers

- PVAMU – Dawonya Tucker – 11 carries, 188 yards, 3 TD
- TXSO – LaDarius Owens – 15 carries, 95 yards

Top receivers

- PVAMU – Tony Mullins – 6 receptions, 141 yards, TD
- TXSO – Donnie Corley – 7 receptions, 92 yards

Statistics	Prairie View A&M	Texas Southern
First downs	23	23
Total yards	615	423
Rushing yards	265	164
Passing yards	350	259
Turnovers	1	2
Time of possession	29:18	30:42

=== At Incarnate Word ===
Texas Southern at Incarnate Word – Game summary

Quarter	1	2	3	4	Total
Tigers	7	10	20	7	44
Cardinals	14	28	7	14	63

at Gayle and Tom Benson Stadium, San Antonio, TX

- Date: September 7
- Game time: 6:00 p.m. CDT
- Game weather: 100 °F (38 °C); sunny; SSE 8 mph
- Game attendance: 3,637
- Referee: Michael Vanderv
- TV announcers (ESPN+): Mike Lefko (play-by-play), Hector Ledesma (analyst), Jill Jelnick (sideline)

Game information

First quarter

- (13:18) UIW TD – Keyondrick Philio 5-yard rush, Carson Mohr kick
  Incarnate Word 7–0; Drive: 4 plays, 59 yards, 1:42
- (08:44) UIW TD – Kam Williams 12-yard pass from Jon Copeland, Carson Mohr kick
  Incarnate Word 14–0; Drive: 8 plays, 60 yards, 2:58
- (06:59) TXSO TD – Chris Long 15-yard pass from De'Andre Johnson, Richard Garcia III kick
  Incarnate Word 14–7; Drive: 6 plays, 72 yards, 1:39

Second quarter

- (14:51) TXSO FG – Richard Garcia III 25-yard field goal
  Incarnate Word 14–10; Drive: 14 plays, 82 yards, 5:05
- (13:10) UIW TD – Kevin Brown 32-yard rush, Carson Mohr kick
  Incarnate Word 21–10; Drive: 5 plays, 67 yards, 1:50
- (13:01) UIW TD – Shawn Holton 30-yard fumble returned, Carson Mohr kick
  Incarnate Word 28–10; Drive: 0 plays, -1 yard, 0:09
- (08:01) UIW TD – Ameer King 3-yard pass from Jon Copeland, Carson Mohr kick
  Incarnate Word 35–10; Drive: 5 plays, 85 yards, 2:09
- (05:02) TXSO TD – Tren'Davian Dickson 87-yard pass from De'Andre Johnson, Richard Garcia III kick
  Incarnate Word 35–17; Drive: 2 plays, 88 yards, 0:25
- (02:42) UIW TD – Marquez Perez 25-yard pass from Jon Copeland, Carson Mohr kick
  Incarnate Word 42–17; Drive: 2 plays, 25 yards, 0:16

Third quarter

- (12:32) TXSO TD – Tren'Davian Dickson 15-yard pass from De'Andre Johnson, Richard Garcia III kick
  Incarnate Word 42–24; Drive: 6 plays, 75 yards, 2:28
- (09:50) UIW TD – Kam Williams 20-yard pass from Jon Copeland, Carson Mohr kick
  Incarnate Word 49–24; Drive: 9 plays, 70 yards, 2:42
- (08:43) TXSO TD – Ladarius Owens 49-yard rush, Richard Garcia III PAT failed
  Incarnate Word 49–31; Drive: 3 plays, 75 yards, 1:07
- (06:10) TXSO TD – Ladarius Owens 1-yard rush, Richard Garcia III kick
  Incarnate Word 49–37; Drive: 4 plays, 54 yards, 1:11

Fourth quarter

- (09:53) UIW TD – Kam Williams 70-yard pass from Jon Copeland, Carson Mohr kick
  Incarnate Word 56–37; Drive: 3 plays, 64 yards, 1:29
- (03:06) UIW TD – Keyondrick Philio 1-yard rush, Carson Mohr kick
  Incarnate Word 63–37; Drive: 9 plays, 72 yards, 5:58
- (00:15) TXSO TD – Roylain Oliver 3-yard pass from Devin Williams, Richard Garcia III kick
  Incarnate Word 63–44; Drive: 12 plays, 75 yards, 2:51

Top passers

- TXSO – DeAndre Johnson – 20/30, 331 yards, 3 TD, INT
- UIW – Jon Copeland – 25/40, 344 yards, 5 TD

Top rushers

- TXSO – LaDarius Owens – 14 carries, 94 yards, 2 TD
- UIW – Ameer King – 14 carries, 157 yards

Top receivers

- TXSO – Tren'Davian Dickson – 8 receptions, 221 yards, 2 TD
- UIW – Kam Williams – 6 receptions, 146 yards, 3 TD

Statistics	Texas Southern	Incarnate Word
First downs	26	30
Total yards	505	726
Rushing yards	148	402
Passing yards	357	344
Turnovers	3	1
Time of possession	27:48	32:12

=== At Louisiana ===
Texas Southern at Louisiana – Game summary

Quarter	1	2	3	4	Total
Tigers	3	3	0	0	6
Ragin' Cajuns	28	28	7	14	77

at Cajun Field, Lafayette, LA

- Date: September 14
- Game time: 6:30 p.m. CST
- Game weather: 91 °F (33 °C); sunny
- Game attendance: 18,183
- Referee: Wayne Winkler
- TV: ESPN3

Game information

First quarter

- (13:18) LA TD – Elijah Mitchell 3-yard rush, Stevie Artigue kick
  Louisiana 7–0; Drive: 5 plays, 63 yards, 1:42
- (09:46) LA TD – Raymond Calais 2-yard rush, Stevie Artigue kick
  Louisiana 14–0; Drive: 8 plays, 62 yards, 2:35
- (07:14) TXSO FG – Richard Garcia III 44-yard field goal
  Louisiana 14–3; Drive: 12 plays, 61 yards, 2:25
- (06:09) LA TD – Trey Ragas 9-yard pass from Levi Lewis, Stevie Artigue kick
  Louisiana 21–3; Drive: 3 plays, 42 yards, 0:54
- (00:39) LA TD – Raymond Calais 16-yard rush, Stevie Artigue kick
  Louisiana 28–3; Drive: 6 plays, 51 yards, 1:55

Second quarter

- (13:08) LA TD – Trey Ragas 34-yard rush, Stevie Artigue kick
  Louisiana 35–3; Drive: 4 plays, 49 yards, 1:13
- (10:56) LA TD – Elijah Mitchell 17-yard rush, Stevie Artigue kick
  Louisiana 42–3; Drive: 3 plays, 44 yards, 1:01
- (08:16) LA TD – Peter LeBlanc 53-yard pass from Levi Lewis, Stevie Artigue kick
  Louisiana 49–3; Drive: 2 plays, 53 yards, 1:04
- (06:07) TXSO FG – Richard Garcia III 40-yard field goal
  Louisiana 49–6; Drive: 9 plays, 53 yards, 2:09
- (04:42) LA TD – Chris Smith 24-yard rush, Stevie Artigue kick
  Louisiana 56–6; Drive: 4 plays, 36 yards, 1:15

Third quarter

- (02:12) LA TD – Cassius Allen 3-yard pass from Jai'Ave Magalei, Stevie Artigue kick
  Louisiana 63–6; Drive: 10 plays, 80 yards, 5:23

Fourth quarter

- (06:27) LA TD – Michael Orphey Jr. 16-yard rush, Stevie Artigue kick
  Louisiana 70–6; Drive: 9 plays, 77 yards, 9:09
- (04:12) LA TD – Ashton Johnson 32-yard rush, Stevie Artigue kick
  Louisiana 77–6; Drive: 4 plays, 59 yards, 1:31

Top passers

- TXSO – De'Andre Johnson – 16/30, 151 yards
- LA – Levi Lewis – 10/13, 181 yards, 2 TD

Top rushers

- TXSO – Tylor Cook – 6 carries, 31 yards
- LA – T. J. Wisham – 10 carries, 103 yards

Top receivers

- TXSO – Donnie Corley – 6 receptions, 62 yards
- LA – Peter LeBlanc – 1 reception, 53 yards, TD

Statistics	Texas Southern	Louisiana
First downs	15	34
Total yards	236	748
Rushing yards	72	440
Passing yards	164	308
Turnovers	0	0
Time of possession	21:52	38:08

=== At Houston Baptist ===
Texas Southern at Houston Baptist – Game summary

Quarter	1	2	3	4	Total
Tigers	0	21	3	7	31
Huskies	17	20	31	0	68

at Husky Stadium, Houston, TX

- Date: September 28
- Game time: 6:00 p.m. CST
- Game weather: 89 °F (32 °C); warm, partly cloudy
- Game attendance: 3,215
- Referee: Vidal Jones

Game information

First quarter

- (12:09) HBU TD – Dreshawn Minnieweather 22-yard rush, Gino Garcia kick
  Houston Baptist 7–0; Drive: 9 plays, 94 yards, 1:55
- (08:07) HBU TD – Jaylon Johnson 15-yard pass from Bailey Zappe, Gino Garcia kick
  Houston Baptist 14–0; Drive: 7 plays, 65 yards, 2:23
- (00:28) HBU FG – Gino Garcia 30-yard field goal
  Houston Baptist 17–0; Drive: 10 plays, 69 yards, 1:47

Second quarter

- (13:02) HBU TD – Jerreth Sterns 10-yard pass from Bailey Zappe, Gino Garcia PAT failed
  Houston Baptist 23–0; Drive: 4 plays, 21 yards, 0:57
- (10:26) HBU TD – Dreshawn Minnieweather 18-yard pass from Bailey Zappe, Gino Garcia kick
  Houston Baptist 30–0; Drive: 8 plays, 62 yards, 1:51
- (08:06) TXSO TD – Tylor Cook 8-yard rush, Richard Garcia III kick
  Houston Baptist 30–7; Drive: 10 plays, 78 yards, 2:13
- (07:43) HBU TD – Ben Ratzlaff 43-yard pass from Bailey Zappe, Gino Garcia kick
  Houston Baptist 37–7; Drive: 3 plays, 65 yards, 0:23
- (05:16) TXSO TD – Tren'Davian Dickson 32-yard pass from De'Andre Johnson, Richard Garcia III kick
  Houston Baptist 37–14; Drive: 8 plays, 75 yards, 2:21
- (01:30) TXSO TD – Donnie Corley 84-yard pass from De'Andre Johnson, Richard Garcia III kick
  Houston Baptist 37–21; Drive: 3 plays, 80 yards, 0:44

Third quarter

- (13:13) HBU TD – Ben Ratzlaff 8-yard pass from Bailey Zappe, Gino Garcia kick
  Houston Baptist 44–21; Drive: 7 plays, 75 yards, 1:47
- (10:17) HBU TD – Ean Beek 52-yard pass from Bailey Zappe, Gino Garcia kick
  Houston Baptist 51–21; Drive: 4 plays, 72 yards, 1:24
- (08:18) HBU TD – Dreshawn Minnieweather 1-yard rush, Gino Garcia kick
  Houston Baptist 58–21; Drive: 3 plays, 34 yards, 1:05
- (07:44) HBU TD – Jerreth Sterns 11-yard pass from Bailey Zappe, Gino Garcia kick
  Houston Baptist 65–21; Drive: 2 plays, 22 yards, 0:20
- (05:25) TXSO FG – Richard Garcia III 33-yard field goal
  Houston Baptist 65–24; Drive: 7 plays, 60 yards, 2:19
- (00:53) HBU FG – Gino Garcia 54-yard field goal
  Houston Baptist 68–24; Drive: 5 plays, 21 yards, 2:06

Fourth quarter

- (14:08) TXSO TD – Tylor Cook 2-yard rush, Richard Garcia III kick
  Houston Baptist 68–31; Drive: 5 plays, 75 yards, 1:45

Top passers

- TXSO – De'Andre Johnson – 25/37, 420 yards, 2 TD
- HBU – Bailey Zappe – 43/59, 498 yards, 7 TD, INT

Top rushers

- TXSO – Tylor Cook – 16 carries, 58 yards, 2 TD
- HBU – Dreshawn Minnieweather – 14 carries, 125 yards, 2 TD

Top receivers

- TXSO – Donnie Corley – 12 receptions, 198 yards, TD
- HBU – Ben Ratzlaff – 8 receptions, 131 yards, 2 TD

Statistics	Texas Southern	Houston Baptist
First downs	25	40
Total yards	503	749
Rushing yards	83	250
Passing yards	420	499
Turnovers	4	1
Time of possession	28:48	31:12

=== At Alabama A&M ===
Texas Southern at Alabama A&M – Game summary

Quarter	1	2	3	4	OT	Total
Tigers	0	13	7	8	0	28
Bulldogs	7	7	14	0	7	35

at Louis Crews Stadium, Normal, AL

- Date: October 5
- Game time: 2:00 p.m. CST
- Game weather: 93 °F (34 °C); sunny and humid
- Game attendance: 14,626
- Referee: Jesse Harris

Game information

First quarter

- (04:16) AAMU TD – Kendric Johnson 20-yard pass from Aqeel Glass, Spencer Corey kick
  Alabama A&M 7–0; Drive: 6 plays, 39 yards, 2:08

Second quarter

- (12:10) TXSO TD – Devin Williams 2-yard rush, Richard Garcia III kick
  Tied 7–7; Drive: 9 plays, 62 yards, 2:50
- (06:51) TXSO FG – Richard Garcia III 24-yard field goal
  Texas Southern 10–7; Drive: 11 plays, 59 yards, 3:54
- (05:10) AAMU TD – Abdul-Fatai Ibrahim 57-yard pass from Aqeel Glass, Spencer Corey kick
  Alabama A&M 14–10; Drive: 4 plays, 84 yards, 1:33
- (02:04) TXSO FG – Richard Garcia III 37-yard field goal
  Alabama A&M 14–13; Drive: 9 plays, 66 yards, 2:13

Third quarter

- (12:07) AAMU TD – Jordan Bentley 4-yard rush, Spencer Corey kick
  Alabama A&M 21–13; Drive: 7 plays, 55 yards, 2:43
- (10:12) AAMU TD – Zabrian Moore 73-yard pass from Aqeel Glass, Spencer Corey kick
  Alabama A&M 28–13; Drive: 1 play, 73 yards, 0:13
- (05:22) TXSO TD – Donnie Corley 50-yard pass from Devin Williams, Richard Garcia III kick
  Alabama A&M 28–20; Drive: 3 plays, 59 yards, 0:50

Fourth quarter

- (11:57) TXSO TD – Ke'Lenn Davis 40-yard pass from Devin Williams, Devin Williams two-point conversion rush
  Tied 28–28; Drive: 9 plays, 77 yards, 3:13

First overtime

- AAMU TD – Abdul-Fatai Ibrahim 12-yard pass from Aqeel Glass, Spencer Corey kick
  Alabama A&M 35–28

Top passers

- TXSO – De'Andre Johnson – 25/40, 252 yards, 2 TD, INT
- AAMU – Aqeel Glass – 28/28, 377 yards, 4 TD

Top rushers

- TXSO – LaDarius Owens – 5 carries, 70 yards
- AAMU – Jordan Bentley – 25 carries, 74 yards, TD

Top receivers

- TXSO – Donnie Corley – 8 receptions, 104 yards, TD
- AAMU – Zabrian Moore – 5 receptions, 93 yards, TD

Statistics	Texas Southern	Alabama A&M
First downs	18	28
Total yards	464	497
Rushing yards	212	120
Passing yards	252	377
Turnovers	2	1
Time of possession	39:37	35:23

=== Missouri S&T ===
Missouri S&T at Texas Southern – Game summary

Quarter	1	2	3	4	Total
Miners	10	7	6	0	23
Tigers	7	10	0	3	20

at Alexander Durley Sports Complex, Houston, TX

- Date: October 12
- Game time: 2:00 p.m. CST
- Game weather: 65 °F (18 °C); sunny and windy
- Game attendance: 8,300
- Referee: Y. N. Myers III
- TV: AT&T SportsNet

Game information

First quarter

- (12:09) MUST TD – Ryan Kirkendall 18-yard interception returned, Benjamin Styron kick
  Missouri S&T 7–0; Drive: 4 plays, 11 yards, 0:57
- (08:25) TXSO TD – Dominic Franklin 8-yard rush, Richard Garcia III kick
  Tied 7–7; Drive: 5 plays, 60 yards, 1:14
- (04:19) MUST FG – Benjamin Styron 32-yard field goal
  Missouri S&T 10–7; Drive: 12 plays, 73 yards, 3:58

Second quarter

- (11:43) TXSO FG – Richard Garcia III 45-yard field goal
  Tied 10–10; Drive: 15 plays, 68 yards, 5:06
- (06:42) TXSO TD – Dominic Franklin 1-yard rush, Richard Garcia III kick
  Texas Southern 17–10; Drive: 9 plays, 75 yards, 2:48
- (02:38) MUST TD – Brennan Simms 1-yard rush, Benjamin Styron kick
  Tied 17–17; Drive: 11 plays, 75 yards, 4:04

Third quarter

- (11:40) MUST FG – Benjamin Styron 31-yard field goal
  Missouri S&T 20–17; Drive: 9 plays, 51 yards, 3:20
- (03:51) MUST FG – Benjamin Styron 41-yard field goal
  Missouri S&T 23–17; Drive: 12 plays, 49 yards, 5:42

Fourth quarter

- (09:36) TXSO FG – Richard Garcia III 24-yard field goal
  Missouri S&T 23–20; Drive: 7 plays, 75 yards, 1:57

Top passers

- MUST – Brennan Simms – 14/34, 219 yards, INT
- TXSO – Devin Williams – 25/37, 273 yards, INT

Top rushers

- MUST – Deshawn Jones – 17 carries, 77 yards
- TXSO – Dominic Franklin – 22 carries, 114 yards, 2 TD

Top receivers

- MUST – Logan Armontrout – 4 receptions, 59 yards
- TXSO – Donnie Corley – 10 receptions, 152 yards

Statistics	Missouri S&T	Texas Southern
First downs	22	22
Total yards	397	446
Rushing yards	178	173
Passing yards	219	273
Turnovers	1	1
Time of possession	31:58	28:02

=== Vs. Southern ===
Southern vs. Texas Southern – Game summary

Quarter	1	2	3	4	Total
Jaguars	7	0	14	7	28
Tigers	7	0	0	14	21

at Cotton Bowl, Dallas, TX

- Date: October 19
- Game time: 2:00 p.m. CST
- Game weather: 83 °F (28 °C); sunny
- Game attendance: 9,685
- Referee: Marty Adams

Game information

First quarter

- (11:54) SOU TD – Jamar Washington 12-yard rush, Martel Fontenot kick
  Southern 7–0; Drive: 9 plays, 65 yards, 2:22
- (05:05) TXSO TD – Dominic Franklin 39-yard rush, Richard Garcia III kick
  Tied 7–7; Drive: 3 plays, 45 yards, 0:54

Third quarter

- (13:34) SOU TD – Jamar Washington 35-yard pass from Glendon McDaniel, Martel Fontenot kick
  Southern 14–7; Drive: 4 plays, 75 yards, 1:26
- (09:21) SOU TD – Hunter Register 31-yard pass from Glendon McDaniel, Martel Fontenot kick
  Southern 21–7; Drive: 6 plays, 66 yards, 2:03

Fourth quarter

- (13:55) TXSO TD – Devin Williams 14-yard rush, Richard Garcia III kick
  Southern 21–14; Drive: 3 plays, 18 yards, 0:31
- (11:57) SOU TD – Jaearion Davis 7-yard pass from Glendon McDaniel, Martel Fontenot kick
  Southern 28–14; Drive: 5 plays, 48 yards, 1:50
- (05:57) TXSO TD – Devin Williams 4-yard rush, Richard Garcia III kick
  Southern 28–21; Drive: 9 plays, 90 yards, 3:05

Top passers

- SOU – Glendon McDaniel – 17/26, 252 yards, 3 TD
- TXSO – Devin Williams – 29/44, 335 yards, INT

Top rushers

- SOU – Devon Benn – 13 carries, 81 yards
- TXSO – Dominic Franklin – 17 carries, 110 yards, TD

Top receivers

- SOU – Hunter Register – 5 receptions, 93 yards, TD
- TXSO – Donnie Corley – 6 receptions, 115 yards

Statistics	Southern	Texas Southern
First downs	28	22
Total yards	295	516
Rushing yards	194	181
Passing yards	295	335
Turnovers	3	2
Time of possession	33:04	26:56

=== At Mississippi Valley State ===
Texas Southern at Mississippi Valley State – Game summary

Quarter	1	2	3	4	Total
Tigers	7	0	0	7	14
Delta Devils	0	19	0	16	35

at Rice–Totten Stadium, Itta Bena, MS

- Date: October 26
- Game time: 2:00 p.m. CST
- Game weather: 60 °F (16 °C); cloudy
- Game attendance: 2,679
- Referee: John Allemand

Game information

First quarter

- (13:19) TXSO TD – Ke'Lenn Davis 5-yard punt block returned, Richard Garcia III kick
  Texas Southern 7–0; Drive: 0 plays, 0 yards, 0:00

Second quarter

- (10:55) MVSU TD – Malik Myers 5-yard pass from Dejerric Bryant, Hayden Schuster PAT failed
  Texas Southern 7–6; Drive: 8 plays, 89 yards, 3:16
- (03:47) MVSU TD – Caleb Johnson 3-yard rush, Hayden Schuster kick
  Mississippi Valley State 13–7; Drive: 8 plays, 89 yards, 3:16

Third quarter

- (09:01) MVSU TD – Tadarius Davis 12-yard interception returned, Dejerric Bryant two-point pass conversion attempt failed
  Mississippi Valley State 19–7; Drive: 0 plays, 0 yards, 0:00

Fourth quarter

- (12:26) MVSU SF – Jerry Garner 4-yard team safety
  Mississippi Valley State 21–7; Drive: 0 plays, 0 yards, 0:00
- (09:03) MVSU TD – Dejerric Bryant 2-yard rush, Hayden Schuster kick
  Mississippi Valley State 28–7; Drive: 7 plays, 47 yards, 3:07
- (02:31) TXSO TD – Malik Webb 12-yard pass from Devin Williams, Richard Garcia III kick
  Mississippi Valley State 28–14; Drive: 6 plays, 34 yards, 1:53
- (00:35) MVSU TD – Jerry Garner 0-yard fumble recovered, Hayden Schuster kick
  Mississippi Valley State 35–14; Drive: 0 plays, 0 yards, 0:00

Top passers

- TXSO – Devin Williams – 9/17, 94 yards, TD, 2 INT
- MVSU – Dejerric Bryant – 7/14, 57 yards, TD

Top rushers

- TXSO – Dominic Franklin – 22 carries, 79 yards
- MVSU – Caleb Johnson – 26 carries, 121 yards, TD

Top receivers

- TXSO – Thurman Morbley – 4 receptions, 49 yards
- MVSU – Johnny Wilson – 2 receptions, 25 yards

Statistics	Texas Southern	Mississippi Valley State
First downs	17	13
Total yards	296	307
Rushing yards	169	250
Passing yards	127	57
Turnovers	6	0
Time of possession	26:05	33:55

=== At Grambling State ===
Texas Southern at Grambling State – Game summary

Quarter	1	2	3	4	Total
TXSO Tigers	0	14	6	0	20
GRAM Tigers	21	20	0	14	55

at Eddie Robinson Stadium, Grambling, LA

- Date: November 2
- Game time: 2:00 p.m. CST
- Game weather: 61 °F (16 °C); cold
- Game attendance: 14,562

Game information

First quarter

- (13:51) GRAM TD – Geremy Hickbottom 73-yard rush, Miguel Mendez kick
  Grambling State 7–0; Drive: 3 plays, 80 yards, 1:19
- (09:23) GRAM TD – Lyndon Rash 38-yard pass from Geremy Hickbottom, Miguel Mendez kick
  Grambling State 14–0; Drive: 6 plays, 67 yards, 2:14
- (04:36) GRAM TD – Geremy Hickbottom 67-yard rush, Miguel Mendez kick
  Grambling State 21–0; Drive: 3 plays, 62 yards, 0:46

Second quarter

- (14:19) GRAM TD – Nicholas Hunter 10-yard pass from Geremy Hickbottom, Miguel Mendez kick
  Grambling State 28–0; Drive: 3 plays, 65 yards, 1:01
- (12:27) TXSO TD – Donnie Corley 35-yard pass from De'Andre Johnson, Brady Obholtz PAT failed
  Grambling State 28–6; Drive: 2 plays, 47 yards, 0:31
- (08:45) GRAM TD – Geremy Hickbottom 1-yard rush, Miguel Mendez PAT blocked
  Grambling State 34–6; Drive: 9 plays, 49 yards, 3:31
- (06:20) GRAM TD – Keilon Elder 5-yard rush, Miguel Mendez kick
  Grambling State 41–6; Drive: 4 plays, 55 yards, 1:20
- (02:30) TXSO TD – De'Andre Johnson 7-yard rush, De'Andre Johnson two-point conversion pass from Thurman Morbley
  Grambling State 41–14; Drive: 13 plays, 85 yards, 3:44

Third quarter

- (11:36) TXSO TD – Tylor Cook 7-yard rush, two-point conversion pass attempt good kick
  Grambling State 41–20; Drive: 10 plays, 75 yards, 4:58

Fourth quarter

- (12:43) GRAM TD – Anfernee Mullins 51-yard interception returned, Miguel Mendez kick
  Grambling State 48–20; Drive: 9 plays, 45 yards, 2:51
- (09:58) GRAM TD – Kevin Dominique 2-yard rush, Miguel Mendez kick
  Grambling State 55–20; Drive: 7 plays, 35 yards, 2:36

Top passers

- TXSO – De'Andre Johnson – 21/40, 351 yards, TD, 2 INT
- GRAM – Geremy Hickbottom – 16/23, 268 yards, 2 TD

Top rushers

- TXSO – De'Andre Johnson – 21 carries, 133 yards, TD
- GRAM – Geremy Hickbottom – 15 carries, 185 yards, 3 TD

Top receivers

- TXSO – Donnie Corley – 11 receptions, 170 yards, TD
- GRAM – Devante Davis – 4 receptions, 80 yards

Statistics	Texas Southern	Grambling State
First downs	34	22
Total yards	637	597
Rushing yards	280	307
Passing yards	357	290
Turnovers	6	0
Time of possession	37:09	22:51

=== Alabama State ===
Alabama State at Texas Southern – Game summary

Quarter	1	2	3	4	Total
Hornets	14	13	0	0	27
Tigers	0	7	7	7	21

at BBVA Stadium, Houston, TX

- Date: November 9
- Game time: 2:00 p.m. CST
- Game weather: 58 °F (14 °C); clear & sunny
- Game attendance: 2,422
- Referee: Tony Ross

Game information

First quarter

- (12:10) ALST TD – Michael Jefferson 53-yard pass from KHA'Darris Davis, Hunter Hanson kick
  Alabama State 7–0; Drive: 3 plays, 82 yards, 1:06
- (05:39) ALST TD – Jacory Merritt 3-yard rush, Hunter Hanson kick
  Alabama State 14–0; Drive: 7 plays, 58 yards, 2:38

Second quarter

- (14:48) TXSO TD – Tariq Buchanan 11-yard pass from De'Andre Johnson, Brady Obholtz kick
  Alabama State 14–7; Drive: 3 plays, 8 yards, 0:37
- (07:03) ALST TD – Michael Jefferson 8-yard pass from KHA'Darris Davis, Hunter Hanson kick
  Alabama State 21–7; Drive: 4 plays, 55 yards, 1:32
- (00:23) ALST TD – Michael Jefferson 6-yard pass from KHA'Darris Davis, Hunter Hanson PAT blocked
  Alabama State 27–7; Drive: 10 plays, 80 yards, 2:19

Third quarter

- (04:00) TXSO TD – De'Andre Johnson 15-yard rush, Brady Obholtz kick
  Alabama State 27–14; Drive: 8 plays, 59 yards, 3:11

Fourth quarter

- (12:27) TXSO TD – Dominic Franklin 34-yard rush, Brady Obholtz kick
  Alabama State 27–21; Drive: 4 plays, 55 yards, 1:38

Top passers

- ALST – KHA'Darris Davis – 14/26, 226 yards, 3 TD, INT
- TXSO – De'Andre Johnson – 16/26, 160 yards, TD

Top rushers

- ALST – Ezra Gray – 24 carries, 154 yards
- TXSO – LaDarius Owens – 17 carries, 78 yards

Top receivers

- ALST – Michael Jefferson – 5 receptions, 102 yards, 3 TD
- TXSO – Donnie Corley – 4 receptions, 65 yards

Statistics	Alabama State	Texas Southern
First downs	18	17
Total yards	403	270
Rushing yards	177	110
Passing yards	226	160
Turnovers	4	0
Time of possession	30:47	29:13

=== At Arkansas–Pine Bluff ===
Texas Southern at Arkansas–Pine Bluff – Game summary

Quarter	1	2	3	4	Total
Tigers	0	7	0	6	13
Golden Lions	10	21	0	14	45

at Simmons Bank Field, Pine Bluff, AR

- Date: November 23
- Game time: 3:00 p.m. CST
- Game weather: 47 °F (8 °C); cloudy
- Game attendance: 5,329
- Referee: John Allmon

Game information

First quarter

- (11:41) UAPB TD – Tyrin Ralph 7-yard pass from Skylar Perry, Zach Piwniczka kick
  Arkansas–Pine Bluff 7–0; Drive: 10 plays, 77 yards, 3:19
- (06:10) UAPB FG – Zach Piwniczka 19-yard field goal
  Arkansas–Pine Bluff 10–0; Drive: 11 plays, 74 yards, 4:14

Second quarter

- (14:35) UAPB TD – Taeyler Porter 5-yard rush, Zach Piwniczka kick
  Arkansas–Pine Bluff 17–0; Drive: 9 plays, 91 yards, 3:55
- (11:41) UAPB TD – Tyrin Ralph 7-yard pass from Skylar Perry, Zach Piwniczka kick
  Arkansas–Pine Bluff 24–0; Drive: 1 play, 41 yards, 0:06
- (06:52) TXSO TD – Ke'Lenn Davis 11-yard pass from De'Andre Johnson, Richard Garcia III kick
  Arkansas–Pine Bluff 24–7; Drive: 3 plays, 22 yards, 0:46
- (05:17) UAPB TD – Daryl Carter 21-yard pass from Shannon Patrick, Zach Piwniczka kick
  Arkansas–Pine Bluff 31–7; Drive: 6 plays, 64 yards, 1:24

Fourth quarter

- (12:32) TXSO TD – De'Andre Johnson 2-yard rush, two-point rush conversion failed
  Arkansas–Pine Bluff 31–13; Drive: 19 plays, 74 yards, 6:50
- (08:23) UAPB TD – Taeyler Porter 1-yard rush, Zach Piwniczka kick
  Arkansas–Pine Bluff 38–13; Drive: 4 plays, 22 yards, 1:12
- (05:04) UAPB TD – Dejuan Miller 71-yard pass from Taylor Holston, Zach Piwniczka kick
  Arkansas–Pine Bluff 45–13; Drive: 3 plays, 65 yards, 2:02

Top passers

- TXSO – De'Andre Johnson – 29/43, 222 yards, TD
- UAPB – Skyler Perry – 9/20, 163 yards, 2 TD

Top rushers

- TXSO – Darius Mitchell – 5 carries, 28 yards
- UAPB – Taeyler Porter – 30 carries, 197 yards, 2 TD

Top receivers

- TXSO – Donnie Corley – 7 receptions, 69 yards
- UAPB – Dejuan Miller – 3 receptions, 106 yards, TD

Statistics	Texas Southern	Arkansas–Pine Bluff
First downs	20	23
Total yards	283	550
Rushing yards	61	273
Passing yards	222	227
Turnovers	2	1
Time of possession	31:39	28:21

== Roster ==
2019 Texas Southern Tigers football team roster
Players
Coaches
Offense

Pos.	#	Name	Class
QB	2	Devin Williams	Jr
RB	3	Tylor Cook	Sr
WR	4	DeAndre Angelle	Jr
WR	5	Thurman Morbley	Jr
WR	6	Malik Webb	Sr
WR	7	Jonathan Giles	Sr
RB	8	Benjamin Hawkins	Sr
WR	9	Donnie Corley	Jr
WR	10	Ke'Lenn Davis	Jr
WR	11	Tren'Davian Dickson	Jr
QB	13	Brysen McKinney	Fr
QB	14	De'Andre Johnson	Sr
QB	16	Jordan Davis	Fr
WR	17	Roylain Oliver	Jr
WR	18	Tariq Buchanan	So
RB	23	Jacorey Howard	Fr
FB	27	Darius Mitchell	Jr
RB	30	Dominic Franklin	So
RB	33	Rajan Cunningham	So
RB	36	Kingston Griffin	Fr
WR	40	Terrence Franklin	Jr
FB	46	Jalen McLin	Fr
FB	52	Adrian Carter	Jr
OL	53	Ray Clayborn	Jr
OL	60	Nate Thompson	Jr
OL	61	Jimmy White	Jr
OL	62	Jack Nance	Fr
OL	63	Kwentin Huddleston	Fr
OL	64	Tate McConnell	Fr
OL	65	Treyvon Robinson	Fr
OL	68	Anthony Phillips	Jr
OL	69	Demetrick Merida	So
OL	70	Skyron Littleton	Fr
OL	71	Soloman Mays	Fr
OL	72	Nathaniel Hines	Jr
OL	73	Dominic Deriggi	Sr
OL	74	Marque Johnson Jr.	Fr
OL	76	Ethan George	Fr
OL	77	Drake Centers	So
OL	78	Aidan Hemphill	Fr
OL	79	Xavier Rodriguez	Jr
OL	80	Lezra Dews	So
WR	82	Montel Parker	Fr
WR	84	Bryston Cummings	Jr
TE	85	Chris Long	Sr
WR	86	Derek Morton	Fr
TE	87	Donald Narcisse	Sr
WR	88	Roderick Howard	Fr

Defense

Pos.	#	Name	Class
DL	1	Michael Badejo	Jr
DB	12	Joshua Murray	Jr
LB	15	Tim Walton Jr.	Sr
DB	19	Matthew Williams	Jr
DB	20	Ja'Corey Benjamin	Fr
DB	21	Matthew Stephenson	Jr
DB	24	Kenterious Walker	Jr
DB	25	Jacob Anderson	Jr
DB	26	Marquel Daigle	Jr
LB	28	Patrick Howell	Jr
LB	29	Paul Favorite	Jr
DB	31	Byron Edwards	Sr
DB	32	Alec Prince	So
DB	35	Dallas Blacklock Jr.	So
DB	38	Marquis Walker	Jr
LB	39	Sherry Durand	Jr
LB	41	Demontario Anderson	Jr
LB	42	JaDarian McGraw	Fr
DB	43	Jude Keelen	Fr
LB	44	Micah Minter	Sr
DB	45	Chrishon Frazier	Jr
DB	47	Rodney Veasey	Sr
DB	48	Anthony Fletcher	So
DB	49	Travaris Achane	Fr
LB	51	Mene Khepera	Jr
LB	54	Julian Marcantel	Sr
DT	55	Kevin Dove	Jr
DL	56	Jarryl Taylor	Sr
LB	57	Drew Robinson	Jr
DT	66	Thomathon Good	Fr
DT	89	Viramontes Pippens	Fr
DL	90	Tobias Marshall	Fr
DB	91	Isaiah Chance	Fr
DL	92	Ike Onwuasoanya	Jr
DL	93	Tyler Martinez	Fr
DL	94	Quincey Williams	So
DE	96	Jason Briggs	So
DL	97	Erick Garcia	Sr
DT	98	Jadon McConnell	Jr
DT	99	Michael Johnson	Jr

Special teams

Pos.	#	Name	Class
LS	50	Tyler Boudreaux	Sr
K	58	Brady Obholtz	Fr
K	59	Richard Garcia III	Fr
P	81	Nic Russo	Fr

Head coach

- Clarence McKinney (Prairie View A&M)

Coordinators/assistant coaches

- David Marsh (Grand Canyon)
  Offensive coordinator, quarterbacks
- Jeffery Ceasar (Grambling State)
  Defensive coordinator, defensive line
- J. B. Brown (Pacific)
  Special teams coordinator
- Dallas Blacklock (Sam Houston State)
  Running backs, recruiting coordinator
- Manny Martinez (Houston)
  Offensive line
- Jerwin Wilson (Louisiana Tech)
  Wide receivers
- Michael Allen II (Lamar)
  Linebackers
- Justin Sanders (Illinois)
  Defensive backs

Legend

- (C) Team captain
- (S) Suspended
- (I) Ineligible
- Injured
- Redshirt

Roster
Last update: May 8, 2020
