= 2019 Lamar Cardinals football team =

American college football season

2019 Lamar Cardinals football
- Conference: Southland Conference
- Record: 4–8 (2–7 Southland)
- Head coach: Mike Schultz (3rd season)
- Co-offensive coordinators: Bill Bleil (1st season); Larry Edmondson (1st season)
- Offensive scheme: Spread
- Co-defensive coordinators: Troy Douglas (3rd season); Cam Clark (2nd season)
- Base defense: 4–3
- Home stadium: Provost Umphrey Stadium

2019 Southland Conference football standings
	Conf.			Overall
Team	W		L	W		L
No. 14 Nicholls +^	7	–	2	8	–	4
No. 11 Central Arkansas +^	7	–	2	9	–	3
No. 19 Southeastern Louisiana ^	6	–	3	8	–	5
Sam Houston State	6	–	3	7	–	5
McNeese State	5	–	4	7	–	5
Incarnate Word	4	–	5	5	–	7
Abilene Christian	4	–	5	5	–	7
Northwestern State	3	–	6	3	–	9
Stephen F. Austin	3	–	6	3	–	9
Houston Baptist	2	–	6	5	–	7
Lamar	2	–	7	4	–	8
+ – Conference co-champions; ^ – FCS playoff participant; Rankings from STATS poll

The 2019 Lamar Cardinals football team represented Lamar University in the 2019 NCAA Division I FCS football season as a member of the Southland Conference. The Cardinals were led by third-year head coach Mike Schultz and played their home games at Provost Umphrey Stadium. The Cardinals played a twelve game regular season schedule in 2019. The schedule included three non-conference and nine conference games.

== TV and radio media ==
All Lamar games were broadcast on KLVI, also known as News Talk 560.

== Preseason ==
=== Preseason poll ===
The Southland Conference released their preseason poll on July 18, 2019. The Cardinals were picked to finish in fifth place.

=== Preseason All–Southland Teams ===
The Cardinals placed three players on the preseason all–Southland teams.

Defense

1st team

Daniel Crosley – DL

Offense

2nd team

Myles Wanza – RB

Elvin Martinez – PK

== Schedule ==
Date	Time	Opponent	Site	TV	Result	Attendance
August 29	7:00 p.m.	Bethel (TN)*	Provost Umphrey Stadium; Beaumont, TX	ESPN3	W 65–16	7,298
September 7	6:00 p.m.	Mississippi Valley State*	Provost Umphrey Stadium; Beaumont, TX	ESPN+	W 23–20 ^{OT}	7,285
September 14	6:00 p.m.	at No. 16 (FBS) Texas A&M*	Kyle Field; College Station, TX	ESPNU/ESPN2	L 3–62	97,195
September 21	7:00 p.m.	at No. 21 Southeastern Louisiana	Strawberry Stadium; Hammond, LA	ESPN+	L 34–45	6,352
September 28	6:00 p.m.	Stephen F. Austin^{†}	Provost Umphrey Stadium; Beaumont, TX	ESPN+	L 17–24	9,218
October 5	6:00 p.m.	Abilene Christian	Provost Umphrey Stadium; Beaumont, TX	ESPN3	W 27–24	6,016
October 12	2:00 p.m.	at No. 25 Sam Houston State	Bowers Stadium; Huntsville, TX	ESPN+	W 20–17 ^{3OT}	4,047
October 19	4:00 p.m.	at Incarnate Word	Gayle and Tom Benson Stadium; San Antonio, TX	ESPN3	L 17–35	3,048
November 2	3:00 p.m.	No. 10 Central Arkansas	Provost Umphrey Stadium; Beaumont, TX	ESPN+	L 17–45	5,913
November 9	6:00 p.m.	at Northwestern State	Harry Turpin Stadium; Natchitoches, LA	CST/ESPN+	L 13–34	5,122
November 16	2:00 p.m.	at Houston Baptist	Husky Stadium; Houston, TX	ESPN3	L 26–31	2,126
November 23	3:00 p.m.	McNeese State	Provost Umphrey Stadium; Beaumont, TX (Battle of the Border)	ESPN3	L 3–27	7,307
*Non-conference game; ^{†}Homecoming; Rankings from STATS Poll released prior to the game; All times are in Central time

== Game summaries ==
=== Bethel (TN) ===
See also Bethel Wildcats

Bethel (TN) at Lamar

Team	1	2	3	4	Total
Wildcats	3	10	0	3	16
• Cardinals	14	27	17	7	65

- Date: August 29
- Location: Provost Umphrey Stadium
  Beaumont, TX
- Game start: 7:00 pm CDT
- Elapsed time: 3:11
- Game attendance: 7,298
- Game weather: 87 • SE 5 MPH • Cloudy and humid
- Referee: Ed Bourgeois
- Television network: ESPN3

=== Mississippi Valley State ===
Mississippi Valley State at Lamar

Team	1	2	3	4	OT	Total
Delta Devils	0	7	6	7	0	20
• Cardinals	0	7	3	10	3	23

- Date: September 7
- Location: Provost Umphrey Stadium
  Beaumont, TX
- Game start: 6:00 pm CDT
- Elapsed time: 3:37
- Game attendance: 7,285
- Game weather: 93 • SW 6 MPH • Clear and humid
- Referee: Vidal Jones
- Television network: ESPN+

=== At Texas A&M ===
Lamar at Texas A&M

Team	1	2	3	4	Total
Cardinals	0	0	3	0	3
• No. 16 (FBS) Aggies	13	14	21	14	62

- Date: September 14
- Location: Kyle Field
  College Station, TX
- Game start: 6:00 p.m. CDT
- Elapsed time: 3:19
- Game attendance: 97,195
- Game weather: 94 • E 9 MPH • 32% humidity
- Referee: Jason Autrey
- Television network: ESPNU/ESPN2

=== At Southeastern Louisiana ===
Lamar at Southeastern Louisiana

Team	1	2	3	4	Total
Cardinals	7	17	3	7	34
• No. 21 Lions	7	14	21	3	45

- Date: September 21
- Location: Strawberry Stadium
  Hammond, LA
- Game start: 7:00 p.m. CDT
- Elapsed time: 3:24
- Game attendance: 6,352
- Game weather: 76 • SE 7 MPH • Mostly Cloudy
- Referee: Dan Lewis
- Television network: ESPN+

=== Stephen F. Austin ===
Stephen F. Austin at Lamar

Team	1	2	3	4	Total
• Lumberjacks	3	10	0	11	24
Cardinals	3	0	0	14	17

- Date: September 28
- Location: Provost Umphrey Stadium
  Beaumont, TX
- Game start: 6:00 pm CDT
- Elapsed time: 3:32
- Game attendance: 9,218
- Game weather: 88 • 12 MPH • Cloudy
- Referee: C. Watson
- Television network: ESPN+

=== Abilene Christian ===
Abilene Christian at Lamar

Team	1	2	3	4	Total
Wildcats	0	13	11	0	24
• Cardinals	7	3	7	10	27

- Date: October 5
- Location: Provost Umphrey Stadium
  Beaumont, TX
- Game start: 6:00 pm CDT
- Elapsed time: 3:18
- Game attendance: 6,016
- Game weather: 85 • 4 MPH • Mostly Clear
- Referee: Dan Lewis
- Television network: ESPN3

=== At Sam Houston State ===
Lamar at Sam Houston State

Team	1	2	3	4	OT	2OT	3OT	Total
• Cardinals	0	7	0	0	3	7	3	20
No. 25 Bearkats	7	0	0	0	3	7	0	17

- Date: October 12
- Location: Bowers Stadium
  Huntsville, TX
- Game start: TBA CDT
- Elapsed time: 3:42
- Game attendance: 4,047
- Game weather: 63 • N 5 MPH • Clear and Sunny
- Referee: Reggie Smith
- Television network: ESPN+

=== At Incarnate Word ===
Lamar at Incarnate Word

Team	1	2	3	4	Total
Cardinals (LU)	7	0	7	3	17
• Cardinals (UIW)	14	14	7	0	35

- Date: October 19
- Location: Gayle and Tom Benson Stadium
  San Antonio, TX
- Game start: 4:00 p.m. CDT
- Elapsed time: 3:18
- Game attendance: 3,048
- Game weather: 92 • 3 MPH • Sunny
- Referee: Dan Lewis
- Television network: ESPN3

=== Central Arkansas ===
Central Arkansas at Lamar

Team	1	2	3	4	Total
• No. 10 Bears	14	10	21	0	45
Cardinals	0	10	0	7	17

- Date: November 2
- Location: Provost Umphrey Stadium
  Beaumont, TX
- Game start: 3:00 pm CDT
- Elapsed time: 3:12
- Game attendance: 5,913
- Game weather: 67 • NNE 10 MPH
- Referee: Vidal Jones
- Television network: ESPN+

=== At Northwestern State ===
Lamar at Northwestern State

Team	1	2	3	4	Total
Cardinals	3	7	3	0	13
• Demons	7	7	7	13	34

- Date: November 9
- Location: Harry Turpin Stadium
  Natchitoches, LA
- Game start: 6:00 p.m. CDT
- Elapsed time: 3:11
- Game attendance: 5,122
- Game weather: 52 • Calm • Clear
- Referee: Cooper Castlebe
- Television network: CST/ESPN+

=== At Houston Baptist ===
Lamar at Houston Baptist

Team	1	2	3	4	Total
Cardinals	6	10	7	3	26
• Huskies	7	17	7	0	31

- Date: November 16
- Location: Husky Stadium
  Houston, TX
- Game start: 2:00 p.m. CST
- Elapsed time: 3:15
- Game attendance: 2,126
- Game weather: 62 • E 2 mph • Clear
- Referee: Ed Bourgeois
- Television network: ESPN3

=== McNeese State ===
McNeese at Lamar

Team	1	2	3	4	Total
• Cowboys	7	0	0	20	27
Cardinals	0	0	0	3	3

- Date: November 23
- Location: Provost Umphrey Stadium
  Beaumont, TX
- Game start: 3:00 pm CST
- Elapsed time: 3:07
- Game attendance: 7,307
- Game weather: 62 • 9 mph • Clear
- Referee: Dan Lewis
- Television network: ESPN3

== Ranking movements ==
Ranking movements Legend: ██ Increase in ranking ██ Decrease in ranking — = Not ranked RV = Received votes
	Week													
Poll	Pre	1	2	3	4	5	6	7	8	9	10	11	12	Final
STATS FCS	RV	RV	RV	RV										
Coaches	RV	RV	RV	—										
