= Clarence McKinney =

American football player and coach (born 1970)

Biographical details
- Born: December 26, 1970 (age 54); Houston, Texas, U.S.

Playing career
- 1989–1991: Montana State
- 1991–1993: Mary
- Position(s): Quarterback, Wide receiver

Coaching career (HC unless noted)
- 1997–2003: Booker T. Washington HS (TX) (assistant)
- 2003–2005: North Shore HS (TX) (assistant)
- 2005–2007: Yates HS (TX)
- 2008–2009: Houston (RB)
- 2010–2011: Houston (RB/RC)
- 2012: Texas A&M (RB)
- 2013: Texas A&M (OC/RB)
- 2014–2017: Texas A&M (RB)
- 2018: Arizona (AHC/RB)
- 2019–2023: Texas Southern

Head coaching record
- Overall: 12–35 (college)

Clarence McKinney (born December 26, 1970) is an American football coach. He was the head football coach at Texas Southern University from 2019-2023, and has served as an assistant coach for Houston Cougars, Texas A&M Aggies, and Arizona Wildcats.

== Early years ==
McKinney played football at Montana State for three years before transferring to the University of Mary Marauders, where he achieved a bachelor's degree in elementary education.

== Coaching career ==
McKinney's first head coaching job was at Jack Yates High School in Houston, Texas, where he compiled a record of 30–8. McKinney then began a long tenure as an assistant for Kevin Sumlin, being on Sumlin's staffs at Houston, Texas A&M, and Arizona.

McKinney was named the head coach of Texas Southern on December 3, 2018.

== Influences ==
In addition to Kevin Sumlin, McKinney said he learned from Dana Holgorsen and Kliff Kingsbury.

== Head coaching record ==
=== College ===
Year	Team	Overall	Conference	Standing	Bowl/playoffs
Texas Southern Tigers (Southwestern Athletic Conference) (2019–2023)
2019	Texas Southern	0–11	0–7	5th (West)	
2020–21	Texas Southern	1–2	1–2	4th (West)	
2021	Texas Southern	3–8	2–6	5th (West)	
2022	Texas Southern	5–6	4–4	T–3rd (West)	
2023	Texas Southern	3–8	2–6	5th (West)	
Texas Southern:		12–35	9–26		
Total:		12–35			
