= 2019 Houston Baptist Huskies football team =

American college football season

2019 Houston Baptist Huskies football
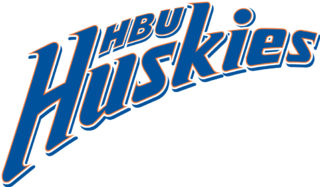
- Conference: Southland Conference
- Record: 5–7 (2–6 Southland)
- Head coach: Vic Shealy (7th season)
- Offensive coordinator: Zach Kittley (2nd season)
- Offensive scheme: Air raid
- Co-defensive coordinators: Roger Hinshaw (7th season); Jeff Mills (2nd season)
- Base defense: 3–4 or 4–3
- Home stadium: Husky Stadium

2019 Southland Conference football standings
	Conf.			Overall
Team	W		L	W		L
No. 14 Nicholls +^	7	–	2	8	–	4
No. 11 Central Arkansas +^	7	–	2	9	–	3
No. 19 Southeastern Louisiana ^	6	–	3	8	–	5
Sam Houston State	6	–	3	7	–	5
McNeese State	5	–	4	7	–	5
Incarnate Word	4	–	5	5	–	7
Abilene Christian	4	–	5	5	–	7
Northwestern State	3	–	6	3	–	9
Stephen F. Austin	3	–	6	3	–	9
Houston Baptist	2	–	6	5	–	7
Lamar	2	–	7	4	–	8
+ – Conference co-champions; ^ – FCS playoff participant; Rankings from STATS poll

The 2019 Houston Baptist Huskies football team represented Houston Baptist University—now known as Houston Christian University—as a member of the Southland Conference during the 2019 NCAA Division I FCS football season. Led by seventh-year head coach Vic Shealy the Huskies compiled an overall record of 5–7 with a mark of 2–6 in conference play, placing tenth in the Southland. Houston Baptist played home games at Husky Stadium in Houston.

The Huskies' five wins set a new program record.

== Preseason ==
=== Preseason poll ===
The Southland Conference released their preseason poll on July 18, 2019. The Huskies were picked to finish in eleventh place.

=== Preseason All–Southland Teams ===
The Huskies placed three players on the preseason all–Southland teams.

Offense

2nd team

Jerreth Sterns – WR

Defense

2nd team

Andre Walker – DL

Caleb Johnson – LB

== Schedule ==
Date	Time	Opponent	Site	TV	Result	Attendance
August 31	7:00 p.m.	at UTEP*	Sun Bowl; El Paso, TX	ESPN+	L 34–36	34,646
September 7	6:00 p.m.	Texas Wesleyan*	Husky Stadium; Houston, TX	Husky SN	W 58–13	2,203
September 14	2:00 p.m.	at South Dakota*	DakotaDome; Vermillion, SD	ESPN3	W 53–52	5,077
September 21	6:00 p.m.	Northwestern State	Husky Stadium; Houston, TX	ESPN3	W 48–21	1,941
September 28	6:00 p.m.	Texas Southern*	Husky Stadium; Houston, TX	ESPN3	W 68–31	3,215
October 5	6:00 p.m.	Incarnate Word	Husky Stadium; Houston, TX	ESPN3	L 36–38	2,289
October 12	6:00 p.m.	at Abilene Christian	Wildcat Stadium; Abilene, TX	ESPN3	L 20–45	7,636
October 19	4:00 p.m.	at McNeese State	Cowboy Stadium; Lake Charles, LA	COWBOYINSIDER	L 27–42	8,083
October 26	2:00 p.m.	Southeastern Louisiana^{†}	Husky Stadium; Houston, TX	ESPN3	L 13–52	2,158
November 9	3:00 p.m.	at No. 25 Nicholls	John L. Guidry Stadium; Thibodaux, LA	CST/ESPN+	L 27–48	4,558
November 16	2:00 p.m.	Lamar	Husky Stadium; Houston, TX	ESPN3	W 31–26	2,126
November 23	2:00 p.m.	at Sam Houston State	Bowers Stadium; Huntsville, TX	ESPN+	L 14–37	3,849
*Non-conference game; ^{†}Homecoming; Rankings from STATS Poll released prior to the game; All times are in Central time

== Game summaries ==
=== At UTEP ===
	1	2	3	4	Total
Huskies	0	17	11	6	34
Miners	3	17	13	3	36

=== Texas Wesleyan ===
	1	2	3	4	Total
Rams	7	0	0	6	13
Huskies	14	30	7	7	58

=== At South Dakota ===
	1	2	3	4	Total
Huskies	0	17	21	15	53
Coyotes	10	14	14	14	52

=== Northwestern State ===
	1	2	3	4	Total
Demons	0	0	14	7	21
Huskies	14	10	17	7	48

=== Texas Southern ===
	1	2	3	4	Total
Tigers	0	21	3	7	31
Huskies	17	20	31	0	68

=== Incarnate Word ===
	1	2	3	4	Total
Cardinals	14	14	10	0	38
Huskies	7	13	10	6	36

=== At Abilene Christian ===
	1	2	3	4	Total
Huskies	0	6	14	0	20
Wildcats	14	7	17	7	45

=== At McNeese State ===
	1	2	3	4	Total
Huskies	7	13	0	7	27
Cowboys	14	14	7	7	42

=== Southeastern Louisiana ===
	1	2	3	4	Total
Lions	14	14	17	7	52
Huskies	6	7	0	0	13

=== At Nicholls ===
	1	2	3	4	Total
Huskies	10	10	0	7	27
No. 25 Colonels	13	14	14	7	48

=== Lamar ===
	1	2	3	4	Total
Cardinals	6	10	7	3	26
Huskies	7	17	7	0	31

=== At Sam Houston State ===
	1	2	3	4	Total
Huskies	0	7	7	0	14
Bearkats	20	7	0	10	37
