= 2019 Sam Houston State Bearkats football team =

American college football season

2019 Sam Houston State Bearkats football
- Conference: Southland Conference
- Record: 7–5 (6–3 Southland)
- Head coach: K. C. Keeler (6th season)
- Offensive coordinator: Ryan Carty (2nd season)
- Offensive scheme: No-huddle spread option
- Defensive coordinator: Clayton Carlin (3rd season season)
- Base defense: 4–2–5
- Home stadium: Bowers Stadium

2019 Southland Conference football standings
	Conf.			Overall
Team	W		L	W		L
No. 14 Nicholls +^	7	–	2	8	–	4
No. 11 Central Arkansas +^	7	–	2	9	–	3
No. 19 Southeastern Louisiana ^	6	–	3	8	–	5
Sam Houston State	6	–	3	7	–	5
McNeese State	5	–	4	7	–	5
Incarnate Word	4	–	5	5	–	7
Abilene Christian	4	–	5	5	–	7
Northwestern State	3	–	6	3	–	9
Stephen F. Austin	3	–	6	3	–	9
Houston Baptist	2	–	6	5	–	7
Lamar	2	–	7	4	–	8
+ – Conference co-champions; ^ – FCS playoff participant; Rankings from STATS poll

The 2019 Sam Houston State Bearkats football team represented Sam Houston State University as a member of the Southland Conference during the 2019 NCAA Division I FCS football season. Led by sixth-year head coach K. C. Keeler, the Bearkats compiled an overall record of 7–5 with a mark of 6–3 in conference play, tying for third place in the Southland. Sam Houston State played home games at Bowers Stadium in Huntsville, Texas.

== Preseason ==
=== Preseason poll ===
The Southland Conference released their preseason poll on July 18, 2019. The Bearkats were picked to finish in fourth place.

=== Preseason All–Southland Teams ===
The Bearkats placed six players on the preseason all–Southland teams.

Offense

1st team

Nathan Stewart – WR

2nd team

Woody Brandom – TE/HB

Defense

1st team

Zyon McCollum – DB

2nd team

Erick Fowler – DL

Hunter Brown – LB

Royce See – LB

=== Post season All–Southland Teams ===
Offense

1st team

Woody Brandom – TE/HB

2nd team

Nathan Stewart – WR

Defense

1st team

Royce See – LB

Zyon McCollum – DB

2nd team

Erick Fowler – DL

Hunter Brown – LB

== Schedule ==
Sam Houston State has scheduled 12 games in the 2019 season instead of the 11 normally allowed for FCS programs. Under a standard provision of NCAA rules, all FCS teams are allowed to schedule 12 regular-season games in years in which the period starting with Labor Day weekend and ending with the last Saturday of November contains 14 Saturdays.

Date	Time	Opponent	Rank	Site	TV	Result	Attendance
August 31	5:00 p.m.	at New Mexico*	No. 23	Dreamstyle Stadium; Albuquerque, NM	LOBOTV	L 31–39	13,749
September 7	6:00 p.m.	Oklahoma Panhandle State*	No. 25	Bowers Stadium; Huntsville, TX	ESPN+	W 77–0	4,942
September 14	4:00 p.m.	at North Dakota*	No. 24	Alerus Center; Grand Forks, ND	Pluto	L 23–27	8,697
September 21	6:00 p.m.	Incarnate Word		Bowers Stadium; Huntsville, TX	ESPN3	W 45–6	8,196
September 28	6:00 p.m.	at McNeese State		Cowboy Stadium; Lake Charles, LA	ESPN+	W 28–17	9,107
October 5	3:00 p.m.	vs. Stephen F. Austin		NRG Stadium; Houston, TX (Battle of the Piney Woods)	ESPN+	W 31–20	24,008
October 12	2:00 p.m.	Lamar	No. 25	Bowers Stadium; Huntsville, TX	ESPN+	L 17–20 ^{3OT}	4,047
October 19	2:00 p.m.	No. 9 Nicholls^{†}		Bowers Stadium; Huntsville, TX	ESPN+	W 17–0	3,953
October 26	6:00 p.m.	at No. 12 Central Arkansas	No. 21	Estes Stadium; Conway, AR	ESPN+	L 25–29	9,363
November 9	3:00 p.m.	at Abilene Christian		Wildcat Stadium; Abilene, TX	ESPN+	W 24–10	6,491
November 16	2:00 p.m.	Northwestern State		Bowers Stadium; Huntsville, TX	ESPN+	L 28–31	4,280
November 23	2:00 p.m.	Houston Baptist		Bowers Stadium; Huntsville, TX	ESPN+	W 37–14	3,849
*Non-conference game; ^{†}Homecoming; Rankings from STATS Poll released prior to the game; All times are in Central time

== Game summaries ==
=== At New Mexico ===
	1	2	3	4	Total
No. 23 Bearkats	0	16	7	8	31
Lobos	13	9	10	7	39

=== Oklahoma Panhandle State ===
	1	2	3	4	Total
Aggies	0	0	0	0	0
No. 25 Bearkats	42	21	14	0	77

=== At North Dakota ===
	1	2	3	4	Total
No. 24 Bearkats	0	14	0	9	23
Fighting Hawks	14	0	13	0	27

=== Incarnate Word ===
	1	2	3	4	Total
Cardinals	0	0	0	6	6
Bearkats	14	17	7	7	45

=== At McNeese State ===
	1	2	3	4	Total
Bearkats	0	9	6	13	28
Cowboys	7	7	3	0	17

=== Vs. Stephen F. Austin ===
	1	2	3	4	Total
Bearkats	0	14	0	17	31
Lumberjacks	7	3	0	10	20

=== Lamar ===
	1	2	3	4	OT	2OT	3OT	Total
Cardinals	0	7	0	0	3	7	3	20
No. 25 Bearkats	7	0	0	0	3	7	0	17

=== Nicholls ===
	1	2	3	4	Total
No. 9 Colonels	0	0	0	0	0
Bearkats	7	3	7	0	17

=== At Central Arkansas ===
	1	2	3	4	Total
No. 21 Bearkats	7	9	6	3	25
No. 12 Bears	0	0	14	15	29

=== At Abilene Christian ===
	1	2	3	4	Total
Bearkats	0	14	10	0	24
Wildcats	10	0	0	0	10

=== Northwestern State ===
	1	2	3	4	Total
Demons	7	17	7	0	31
Bearkats	21	0	7	0	28

=== Houston Baptist ===
	1	2	3	4	Total
Huskies	0	7	7	0	14
Bearkats	20	7	0	10	37

== Ranking movements ==
Ranking movements Legend: ██ Increase in ranking ██ Decrease in ranking RV = Received votes
	Week													
Poll	Pre	1	2	3	4	5	6	7	8	9	10	11	12	Final
STATS FCS	23	25	24	RV	RV	RV	25	RV	21	RV				
Coaches	22	22	21	RV	RV	RV	24	RV	25	RV				
