= De'Andre Johnson =

American football player (born 1996)

No. 1
- Position: Quarterback

Personal information
- Born: February 2, 1996 (age 30); Jacksonville, Florida, U.S.
- Listed height: 6 ft 2 in (1.88 m)
- Listed weight: 230 lb (104 kg)

Career information
- High school: First Coast (Jacksonville)
- College: East Mississippi CC (2016); Florida Atlantic (2017–2018); Texas Southern (2019)
- NFL draft: 2020: undrafted

Career history

Playing
- TSL Sea Lions (2021); New Jersey Generals (2022–2023)

Coaching
- Holmes CC (MS) (2024) Offensive assistant & running backs coach

Awards and highlights
- MACJC North MVP (2017); Offensive MVP and NJCAA Region 23 MVP (2017)

Career USFL statistics as of Week 1, 2023
- Passing attempts: 88
- Passing completions: 58
- Completion percentage: 65.9%
- TD–INT: 2–2
- Passing yards: 772
- Passer rating: 102.8

De'Andre Johnson (born February 2, 1996) is an American football coach and former quarterback who is the offensive assistant and running backs coach at Holmes Community College, a position he has held since 2024.

Johnson played college football for the Florida Atlantic Owls and the Texas Southern Tigers, as well as junior college football for the East Mississippi Lions. He played two seasons in the United States Football League (USFL) with the New Jersey Generals.

== Early life ==
Johnson grew up in Jacksonville, Florida and attended First Coast High School. As a senior, he completed 215 of 328 pass attempts for 3,710 yards and 47 touchdowns while rushing for 398 yards and nine touchdowns and was named the Class 8A Player of the Year and Florida's "Mr. Football". Johnson committed to play college football at Florida State during the summer before his sophomore year over offers from Clemson and Florida.

== College career ==
Johnson began his collegiate career at Florida State University to play for the Florida State Seminoles, and joined the team as an early enrollee. During the summer before his freshman season, he was charged with misdemeanor battery for punching a woman during an argument. Johnson was ultimately dismissed from the team on July 6, 2015.

Following his dismissal, Johnson enrolled at East Mississippi Community College. While at East Mississippi, he was featured in the second season of the Netflix documentary series Last Chance U, where he played under head coach Buddy Stephens. In his only season with the Lions, Johnson passed for 2,646 yards and 26 touchdowns. He committed to transfer to Florida Atlantic University to continue his college football career.

In his first season with the Florida Atlantic Owls, Johnson completed 2 of 3 pass attempts for five yards with one interception and rushed four times for 31 yards in the team's season opener against the Navy Midshipmen. Several hours after the game, he was hospitalized due to blood clots in his arm and missed the remainder of his redshirt sophomore season. After his redshirt junior season, Johnson announced that he would be transferring to Texas Southern University as a graduate student. In his only season with the Texas Southern Tigers, he completed 132 of 215 pass attempts for 1,575 yards with nine touchdowns and three interceptions.

=== College statistics ===
Year	Team	Games		Passing								Rushing			
Year	Team	GP	GS	Cmp	Att	Pct	Yds	Y/A	TD	Int	Rtg	Att	Yds	Avg	TD
2016	East Mississippi CC	11	11	212	350	60.6	2,646	7.6	26	6	145.2	138	834	6.0	5
2017	Florida Atlantic	4	0	2	3	66.7	5	1.7	0	1	14.0	4	31	7.8	0
2018	Florida Atlantic	8	0	13	23	56.5	161	7.0	2	1	135.3	8	35	5.1	1
2019	Texas Southern	10	8	132	215	60.0	1,575	7.6	9	3	132.5	111	187	1.68	3
Career		33	21	352	591	243.8	4,387	23.9	37	11	427.0	261	1,087	20.58	9

== Professional career ==
Johnson went unselected in the 2020 NFL draft. In 2021, he played in The Spring League for the Sea Lions and passed for 574 yards with 5 touchdowns and 7 interceptions over six games.

Johnson was selected in the 12th round of the 2022 USFL draft by the New Jersey Generals. He was named the backup, behind Luis Perez. In the USFL opener, Johnson was used regularly in various offensive packages and rushed for a game-high 98 yards and one touchdown on 12 carries and completing 3 of 8 passes for 59 yards in a 24–28 loss to the Birmingham Stallions. Johnson became a free agent after the 2023 season.

=== Statistics ===
USFL statistics
Year	Team	Games		Passing								Rushing			
Year	Team	GP	GS	Cmp	Att	Pct	Yds	Y/A	TD	Int	Rtg	Att	Yds	Avg	TD
2022	NJ	9	4	54	75	72.0	772	10.3	2	2	102.8	64	310	4.8	4
2023	NJ	8	7	73	128	57.0	940	7.3	4	2	84.1	56	361	6.4	2

== Coaching career ==
On August 21, 2024, Johnson was named as the offensive assistant and running backs coach at Holmes Community College.
