= 2019 McNeese State Cowboys football team =

American college football season

2019 McNeese State Cowboys football
- Conference: Southland Conference
- Record: 7–5 (5–4 Southland)
- Head coach: Sterlin Gilbert (1st season)
- Offensive coordinator: Matt Mattox (1st season)
- Defensive coordinator: Jim Gush (1st season)
- Home stadium: Cowboy Stadium

2019 Southland Conference football standings
	Conf.			Overall
Team	W		L	W		L
No. 14 Nicholls +^	7	–	2	8	–	4
No. 11 Central Arkansas +^	7	–	2	9	–	3
No. 19 Southeastern Louisiana ^	6	–	3	8	–	5
Sam Houston State	6	–	3	7	–	5
McNeese State	5	–	4	7	–	5
Incarnate Word	4	–	5	5	–	7
Abilene Christian	4	–	5	5	–	7
Northwestern State	3	–	6	3	–	9
Stephen F. Austin	3	–	6	3	–	9
Houston Baptist	2	–	6	5	–	7
Lamar	2	–	7	4	–	8
+ – Conference co-champions; ^ – FCS playoff participant; Rankings from STATS poll

The 2019 McNeese State Cowboys football team represented McNeese State University as a member of the Southland Conference during the 2019 NCAA Division I FCS football season. Led by Sterlin Gilbert in his first and only season as head coach, the Cowboys compiled an overall record of 7–5 with a mark of 5–4 in conference play, placing fifth in the Southland. McNeese State played home games at Cowboy Stadium in Lake Charles, Louisiana.

On November 20, 2018, head coach Lance Guidry was fired. He finished at McNeese State with a three-year record of 21–12. On December 5, the school hired South Florida offensive coordinator Sterlin Gilbert as head coach.

== Preseason ==
=== Preseason poll ===
The Southland Conference released their preseason poll on July 18, 2019. The Cowboys were picked to finish in sixth place.

=== Preseason All–Southland Teams ===
The Cowboys placed three players on the preseason all–Southland teams.

Offense

1st team

Grant Burguillos – OL

Defense

1st team

Chris Livings – DL

Colby Burton – DB

== Schedule ==
Date	Time	Opponent	Site	TV	Result	Attendance
August 31	6:00 p.m.	Southern*	Cowboy Stadium; Lake Charles, LA	CST/ESPN+	W 34–28	20,437
September 7	6:00 p.m.	at Oklahoma State*	Boone Pickens Stadium; Stillwater, OK	ESPN+	L 14–56	55,509
September 14	6:00 p.m.	Alcorn State*	Cowboy Stadium; Lake Charles, LA	COWBOYINSIDER	W 17–14	10,127
September 21	6:00 p.m.	at Abilene Christian	Wildcat Stadium; Abilene, TX	ESPN+	L 10–17	9,624
September 28	6:00 p.m.	Sam Houston State	Cowboy Stadium; Lake Charles, LA	ESPN+	L 17–28	9,107
October 5	4:00 p.m.	No. 19 Southeastern Louisiana	Cowboy Stadium; Lake Charles, LA	CST/ESPN+	W 38–34	8,217
October 12	4:00 p.m.	No. 16 Central Arkansas	Estes Stadium; Conway, AR (Red Beans and Rice Bowl)	ESPN+	L 31–40	11,237
October 19	4:00 p.m.	Houston Baptist^{†}	Cowboy Stadium; Lake Charles, LA	COWBOYINSIDER	W 42–27	8,083
October 26	3:00 p.m.	at Stephen F. Austin	Homer Bryce Stadium; Nacogdoches, TX	ESPN+	W 33–10	8,335
November 2	4:00 p.m.	Northwestern State	Cowboy Stadium; Lake Charles, LA (rivalry)	CST/ESPN+	W 30–20	9,295
November 16	3:00 p.m.	at No. 24 Nicholls	Manning Field at John L. Guidry Stadium; Thibodaux, LA	CST/ESPN+	L 20–34	8,958
November 23	3:00 p.m.	at Lamar	Provost Umphrey Stadium; Beaumont, TX (Battle of the Border)	ESPN3	W 27–3	7,307
*Non-conference game; ^{†}Homecoming; Rankings from STATS Poll released prior to the game; All times are in Central time

== Game summaries ==
=== Southern ===
Southern at McNeese State – Game summary

Quarter	1	2	3	4	Total
Jaguars	7	7	0	14	28
RV Cowboys	7	10	7	10	34

at Cowboy Stadium, Lake Charles, LA

- Date: August 31
- Game time: 6:00 p.m. CST
- Game weather: 93 °F (34 °C); fair skies
- Game attendance: 20,437
- Referee: C. Watson
- TV: CST

Game information

First quarter

- (06:11) MCNS TD – J'Cobi Skinner 1-yard rush, Noah Anderson kick
  McNeese State 7–0; Drive: 6 plays, 29 yards, 1:41
- (03:22) SOU TD – Timothy Bedford 33-yard pass from Ladarius Skelton, Martel Fontenot kick
  Tied 7–7; Drive: 7 plays, 75 yards, 2:49

Second quarter

- (14:52) SOU TD – Hunter Register 43-yard pass from Ladarius Skelton, Martel Fontenot kick
  Southern 14–7; Drive: 4 plays, 79 yards, 1:06
- (09:38) MCNS FG – Noah Anderson 37-yard field goal
  Southern 14–10; Drive: 15 plays, 57 yards, 5:08
- (01:49) MCNS TD – Trevor Begue 12-yard pass from Cody Orgeron, Noah Anderson kick
  McNeese State 17–14; Drive: 3 plays, 13 yards, 3:51

Third quarter

- (10:16) MCNS TD – Trevor Begue 24-yard pass from Cody Orgeron, Noah Anderson kick
  McNeese State 24–14; Drive: 7 plays, 36 yards, 2:59

Fourth quarter

- (10:38) MCNS FG – Noah Anderson 29-yard field goal
  McNeese State 27–14; Drive: 8 plays, 50 yards, 3:31
- (05:25) MCNS TD – Elijah Mack 3-yard rush, Noah Anderson kick
  McNeese State 34–14; Drive: 11 plays, 76 yards, 4:13
- (03:41) SOU TD – Hunter Register 17-yard pass from Glendon McDaniel, Martel Fontenot kick
  McNeese State 34–21; Drive: 4 plays, 75 yards, 1:44
- (00:32) SOU TD – Glendon McDaniel 1-yard rush, Martel Fontenot kick
  McNeese State 34–28; Drive: 10 plays, 99 yards, 1:59

Top passers

- MCNS - Cody Orgeron - 15/22, 147 yards, 2 TD
- SOU - Glendon McDaniel - 11/19, 135 yards, TD

Top rushers

- MCNS - Elijah Mack - 12 carries, 45 yards, TD
- SOU - Devon Benn - 11 carries, 33 yards

Top receivers

- MCNS - Cyron Sutton - 3 receptions, 51 yards
- SOU - Hunter Register - 4 receptions, 82 yards, 2 TD

Statistics	Southern	McNeese State
First downs	29	18
Total yards	342	303
Rushing yards	103	154
Passing yards	239	149
Turnovers	5	0
Time of possession	26:35	33:25

=== At Oklahoma State ===
McNeese State at Oklahoma State – Game summary

Quarter	1	2	3	4	Total
MCNS Cowboys	0	0	7	7	14
OSU Cowboys	14	14	28	0	56

at Boone Pickens Stadium, Stillwater, OK

- Date: September 7
- Game time: 6:00 p.m. CST
- Game weather: 95 °F (35 °C); sunny; SE 12 MPH
- Game attendance: 55,509
- Referee: Christian Watson
- TV announcers (ESPN+): Dave LaMont (Play-By-Play) & Barrett Brooks (Analysts)

Game information

First quarter

- (15:00) OSU TD – A. J. Green 27-yard interception returned, Matt Ammendola kick
  Oklahoma State 7–0; Drive: 2 plays, 1 yards, 0:45
- (01:29) OSU TD – Tylan Wallace 69-yard pass from Spencer Sanders, Matt Ammendola kick
  Oklahoma State 14–0; Drive: 2 plays, 73 yards, 0:30

Second quarter

- (07:43) OSU TD – Chuba Hubbard 4-yard rush, Matt Ammendola kick
  Oklahoma State 21–0; Drive: 15 plays, 91 yards, 4:13
- (01:29) OSU TD – Tylan Wallace 4-yard pass from Spencer Sanders, Matt Ammendola kick
  Oklahoma State 28–0; Drive: 11 plays, 91 yards, 3:30

Third quarter

- (14:48) OSU TD – Tylan Wallace 75-yard pass from Spencer Sanders, Matt Ammendola kick
  Oklahoma State 35–0; Drive: 1 play, 75 yards, 0:12
- (11:15) MCNS TD – D'Andre Hicks 16-yard pass from Cody Orgeron, Noah Anderson kick
  Oklahoma State 35–7; Drive: 7 plays, 82 yards, 3:33
- (09:15) OSU TD – C. J. Moore 59-yard pass from Dru Brown, Matt Ammendola kick
  Oklahoma State 42–7; Drive: 5 plays, 75 yards, 2:00
- (06:52) OSU TD – Braydon Johnson 69-yard pass from Dru Brown, Matt Ammendola kick
  Oklahoma State 49–7; Drive: 2 plays, 72 yards, 0:34
- (06:04) OSU TD – Micah Cooper 1-yard rush, Matt Ammendola kick
  Oklahoma State 56–7; Drive: 1 play, 1 yard, 0:03

Fourth quarter

- (05:34) MCNS TD – Marcus Foster 32-yard fumble returned, Noah Anderson kick
  Oklahoma State 56–14; Drive: 5 plays, 26 yards, 2:13

Top passers

- OSU - Spencer Sanders - 12/18, 250 yards, 3 TD
- MCNS - Cody Orgeron - 11/22, 151 yards, TD, 2 INT

Top rushers

- OSU - Spencer Sanders - 12 carries, 51 yards
- MCNS - Cody Orgeron - 16 carries, 89 yards

Top receivers

- OSU - Tylan Wallace - 5 receptions, 180 yards, 3 TD
- MCNS - D'Andre Hicks - 3 receptions, 69 yards, TD

Statistics	McNeese State	Oklahoma State
First downs	13	25
Total yards	318	580
Rushing yards	161	167
Passing yards	157	413
Turnovers	2	2
Time of possession	31:45	28:15

=== Alcorn State ===
Alcorn State at McNeese State – Game summary

Quarter	1	2	3	4	Total
Braves	0	0	0	14	14
Cowboys	7	10	0	0	17

at Cowboy Stadium, Lake Charles, LA

- Date: September 14
- Game time: 6:00 p.m. CST
- Game weather: 95 °F (35 °C); fair skies
- Game attendance: 10,127
- Referee: Christian Watson

Game information

First quarter

- (06:27) MCNS TD – Cyron Sutton 19-yard pass from Cody Orgeron, Noah Anderson kick
  McNeese State 7–0; Drive: 6 plays, 65 yards, 1:12

Second quarter

- (13:42) MCNS TD – Trevor Begue 13-yard pass from Cody Orgeron, Noah Anderson kick
  McNeese State 14–0; Drive: 3 plays, 25 yards, 0:50
- (08:52) MCNS FG – Noah Anderson 37-yard field goal
  McNeese State 17–0; Drive: 10 plays, 52 yards, 3:24

Fourth quarter

- (06:27) ALCN TD – Chris Blair 13-yard pass from Felix Harper, Corey McCullough PAT failed
  McNeese State 17–6; Drive: 1 plays, 25 yards, 0:06
- (06:27) ALCN TD – Niko Duffey 14-yard pass from Felix Harper, Felix Harper two-point conversion pass to LeCharles Pringle
  McNeese State 17–14; Drive: 10 plays, 57 yards, 1:01

Top passers

- MCNS - Cody Orgeron - 19/29, 191 yards, 2 TD
- ALCN - Felix Harper - 13/28, 132 yards, 2 TD, 2 INT

Top rushers

- MCNS - J'Cobi Skinner - 14 carries, 52 yards
- ALCN - De'Shawn Waller - 18 carries, 77 yards

Top receivers

- MCNS - Trevor Begue - 8 receptions, 94 yards, TD
- ALCN - Niko Duffey - 5 receptions, 54 yards, TD

Statistics	Alcorn State	McNeese State
First downs	22	14
Total yards	318	324
Rushing yards	154	133
Passing yards	164	191
Turnovers	3	2
Time of possession	32:05	27:55

=== At Abilene Christian ===
McNeese State at Abilene Christian – Game summary

Quarter	1	2	3	4	Total
Cowboys	3	0	0	7	10
Wildcats	3	7	0	7	17

at Anthony Field at Wildcat Stadium, Abilene, TX

- Date: September 21
- Game time: 6:00 p.m. CST
- Game weather: 91 °F (33 °C); mostly cloudy
- Game attendance: 9,624
- Referee: Cal McNeill
- TV: ESPN+

Game information

First quarter

- (04:50) ACU FG – Blair Zepeda 25-yard field goal
  Abilene Christian 3–0; Drive: 9 plays, 50 yards, 3:51
- (00:16) MCNS FG – Noah Anderson 23-yard field goal
  Tied 3–3; Drive: 13 plays, 70 yards, 4:34

Second quarter

- (07:33) ACU TD – Tracy James 59-yard pass from Luke Anthony, Blair Zepeda kick
  Abilene Christian 10–3; Drive: 8 plays, 90 yards, 3:13

Fourth quarter

- (01:53) MCNS TD – Cyron Sutton 28-yard pass from Cody Orgeron, Noah Anderson kick
  Tied 10–10; Drive: 9 plays, 62 yards, 2:38
- (00:13) ACU TD – Tracy James 1-yard rush, Blair Zepeda kick
  Abilene Christian 17–10; Drive: 8 plays, 37 yards, 0:40

Top passers

- ACU - Luke Anthony - 26/44, 313 yards, TD
- MCNS - Cody Orgeron - 17/33, 189 yards, TD, INT

Top rushers

- ACU - Tracy James - 15 carries, 36 yards, TD
- MCNS - Elijah Mack - 18 carries, 125 yards

Top receivers

- ACU - Josh Fink - 9 receptions, 123 yards
- MCNS - Cyron Sutton - 5 receptions, 101 yards, TD

Statistics	McNeese State	Abilene Christian
First downs	18	16
Total yards	383	415
Rushing yards	194	85
Passing yards	189	330
Turnovers	3	0
Time of possession	30:12	29:48

=== Sam Houston State ===
Sam Houston State at McNeese State – Game summary

Quarter	1	2	3	4	Total
Bearkats	0	9	6	13	28
Cowboys	7	7	3	0	17

at Cowboy Stadium, Lake Charles, LA

- Date: September 28
- Game time: 6:00 p.m. CST
- Game attendance: 9,107
- Referee: Brandon Cruse
- TV: ESPN+

Game information

First quarter

- (03:07) MCNS TD – Cyron Sutton 67-yard pass from Cody Orgeron, Bailey Raborn kick
  McNeese State 7–0; Drive: 2 plays, 67 yards, 0:17

Second quarter

- (12:00) SHSU TD – Nathan Stewart 21-yard pass from Ty Brock, Connor Crow kick
  Tied 7–7; Drive: 6 plays, 84 yards, 2:14
- (07:43) MCNS TD – Draysean Hudson 27-yard pass from Cody Orgeron, Bailey Raborn kick
  McNeese State 14–7; Drive: 6 plays, 69 yards, 1:33
- (04:17) SHSU SF – Team Safety
  McNeese State 14–9; Drive: 6 plays, 74 yards, 2:33

Third quarter

- (08:45) SHSU TD – Noah Smith 61-yard pass from Ty Brock, two-point conversion pass failed
  Sam Houston State 15–14; Drive: 5 plays, 89 yards, 2:27
- (03:47) MCNS FG – Bailey Raborn 43-yard field goal
  McNeese State 17–15; Drive: 10 plays, 35 yards, 2:17

Fourth quarter

- (11:13) SHSU TD – Chandler Harvin 12-yard pass from Ty Brock, two-point conversion pass failed
  Sam Houston State 21–17; Drive: 18 plays, 73 yards, 7:27
- (09:38) SHSU TD – Kyran Jackson 5-yard rush, Connor Crow kick
  Sam Houston State 28–17; Drive: 3 plays, 43 yards, 0:59

Top passers

- SHSU - Ty Brock - 14/29, 262 yards, 3 TD, 2 INT
- MCNS - Cody Orgeron - 18/40, 280 yards, 2 TD, 2 INT

Top rushers

- SHSU - Kyran Jackson - 20 carries, 111 yards, TD
- MCNS - Cody Orgeron - 12 carries, 17 yards

Top receivers

- SHSU - Nathan Stewart - 6 receptions, 157 yards, TD
- MCNS - Cyron Sutton - 10 receptions, 160 yards, TD

Statistics	Sam Houston State	McNeese State
First downs	18	14
Total yards	416	318
Rushing yards	89	38
Passing yards	327	280
Turnovers	3	2
Time of possession	37:36	22:24

=== Southeastern Louisiana ===
Southeastern Louisiana at McNeese State – Game summary

Quarter	1	2	3	4	Total
No. 19 Lions	3	14	3	14	34
Cowboys	10	14	0	14	38

at Cowboy Stadium, Lake Charles, LA

- Date: October 5
- Game time: 4:00 p.m. CST
- Game weather: 92 °F (33 °C); sunny & humid
- Game attendance: 8,217
- Referee: Kevin Hassell
- TV: CST

Game information

First quarter

- (09:48) MCNS TD – Davion Curtis 20-yard pass from Cody Orgeron, Bailey Raborn kick
  McNeese State 7–0; Drive: 7 plays, 36 yards, 2:30
- (04:45) MCNS FG – Bailey Raborn 21-yard field goal
  McNeese State 10–0; Drive: 10 plays, 36 yards, 3:37
- (00:07) SELA FG – Bryce Broussard 20-yard field goal
  McNeese State 10–3; Drive: 10 plays, 72 yards, 4:38

Second quarter

- (13:30) MCNS TD – Cyron Sutton 58-yard pass from Cody Orgeron, Bailey Raborn kick
  McNeese State 17–3; Drive: 6 plays, 83 yards, 1:33
- (05:35) MCNS TD – Elijah Mack 2-yard rush, Bailey Raborn kick
  McNeese State 24–3; Drive: 7 plays, 57 yards, 3:48
- (02:42) SELA TD – CJ Turner 10-yard pass from Chason Virgil, Bryce Broussard kick
  McNeese State 24–10; Drive: 7 plays, 62 yards, 2:48
- (00:23) SELA TD – Lorenzo Nunez 31-yard pass from Cole Kelley, Bryce Broussard kick
  McNeese State 24–17; Drive: 13 plays, 94 yards, 1:37

Third quarter

- (01:09) SELA FG – Bryce Broussard 21-yard field goal
  McNeese State 24–20; Drive: 10 plays, 77 yards, 4:06

Fourth quarter

- (13:02) SELA TD – Lorenzo Nunez 60-yard pass from Chason Virgil, Bryce Broussard kick
  Southeastern Louisiana 27–24; Drive: 6 plays, 80 yards, 1:46
- (09:56) MCNS TD – Elijah Mack 1-yard rush, Bailey Raborn kick
  McNeese State 31–27; Drive: 8 plays, 77 yards, 3:00
- (07:06) SELA TD – Bransen Schwebel 2-yard pass from Cole Kelley, Bryce Broussard kick
  Southeastern Louisiana 34–31; Drive: 6 plays, 65 yards, 2:50
- (02:21) MCNS TD – Trevor Begue 33-yard pass from Cody Orgeron, Bailey Raborn kick
  McNeese State 38–34; Drive: 9 plays, 89 yards, 2:35

Top passers

- MCNS – Cody Orgeron – 12/29, 248 yards, 3 TD
- SELA – Chason Virgil – 27/49, 321 yards, 2 TD, INT

Top rushers

- MCNS – Elijah Mack – 28 carries, 142 yards, 2 TD
- SELA – Austin Mitchell – carry, 36 yards

Top receivers

- MCNS – Cyron Sutton – 4 receptions, 82 yards, TD
- SELA – Bransen Schwebel – 8 receptions, 94 yards, TD

Statistics	Southeastern Louisiana	McNeese State
First downs	19	23
Total yards	452	473
Rushing yards	86	225
Passing yards	366	248
Turnovers	2	0
Time of possession	28:57	31:03

=== At Central Arkansas ===
McNeese State at Central Arkansas – Game summary

Quarter	1	2	3	4	Total
Cowboys	10	14	0	7	31
No. 16 Bears	10	10	14	6	40

at Estes Stadium, Conway, AR

- Date: October 12
- Game time: 4:00 p.m. CST
- Game weather: 62 °F (17 °C); sunny
- Game attendance: 11,237
- Referee: Michael Vanderv
- TV: ESPN+

Game information

First quarter

- (14:26) MCNS TD – Cyron Sutton 31-yard pass from Cody Orgeron, Bailey Raborn kick
  McNeese State 7–0; Drive: 2 plays, 34 yards, 0:23
- (09:10) UCA FG – Hayden Ray 34-yard field goal
  McNeese State 7–3; Drive: 12 plays, 59 yards, 5:16
- (06:30) MCNS FG – Bailey Raborn 25-yard field goal
  McNeese State 10–3; Drive: 7 plays, 58 yards, 2:40
- (05:01) UCA TD – Carlos Blackman 17-yard pass from Breylin Smith, Hayden Ray kick
  Tied 10–10; Drive: 5 plays, 75 yards, 1:29

Second quarter

- (11:49) MCNS TD – Cyron Sutton 5-yard pass from Cody Orgeron, Bailey Raborn kick
  McNeese State 17–10; Drive: 9 plays, 66 yards, 3:26
- (05:50) UCA FG – Hayden Ray 39-yard field goal
  McNeese State 17–13; Drive: 11 plays, 52 yards, 4:45
- (01:56) UCA TD – Joe Hampton 38-yard pass from Breylin Smith, Hayden Ray kick
  Central Arkansas 20–17; Drive: 7 plays, 80 yards, 1:54
- (00:25) MCNS TD – Trevor Begue 32-yard pass from Cody Orgeron, Bailey Raborn kick
  McNeese State 24–20; Drive: 9 plays, 65 yards, 1:31

Third quarter

- (07:56) UCA TD – Tyler Hudson 78-yard pass from Breylin Smith, Hayden Ray kick
  Central Arkansas 27–24; Drive: 1 play, 78 yards, 0:12
- (02:26) UCA TD – Tyler Hudson 19-yard pass from Luke Hales, Hayden Ray kick
  Central Arkansas 34–24; Drive: 3 plays, 7 yards, 1:16

Fourth quarter

- (12:10) MCNS TD – Louis Conerly 4-yard pass from Cody Orgeron, Bailey Raborn kick
  Central Arkansas 34–31; Drive: 14 plays, 75 yards, 5:36
- (07:41) UCA FG – Hayden Ray 25-yard field goal
  Central Arkansas 37–31; Drive: 9 plays, 68 yards, 4:36
- (06:42) UCA FG – Hayden Ray 39-yard field goal
  Central Arkansas 40–31; Drive: 4 plays, 0 yards, 0:52

Top passers

- UCA – Breylin Smith – 28/41, 369 yards, 3 TD, 2 INT
- MCNS – Cody Orgeron – 26/41, 344 yards, 4 TD, INT

Top rushers

- UCA – Carlos Blackman – 15 carries, 64 yards
- MCNS – Elijah Mack – 20 carries, 70 yards

Top receivers

- UCA – Tyler Hudson – 4 receptions, 113 yards, 2 TD
- MCNS – Cyron Sutton – 13 receptions, 156 yards, 2 TD

Statistics	McNeese State	Central Arkansas
First downs	19	23
Total yards	452	473
Rushing yards	86	225
Passing yards	366	248
Turnovers	2	0
Time of possession	28:57	31:03

=== Houston Baptist ===
Houston Baptist at McNeese State – Game summary

Quarter	1	2	3	4	Total
Huskies	7	13	0	7	27
Cowboys	14	14	7	7	42

at Cowboy Stadium, Lake Charles, LA

- Date: October 19
- Game time: 4:00 p.m. CST
- Game weather: 85 °F (29 °C); partly cloudy
- Game attendance: 8,083
- Referee: Ed Bourgeois
- TV: ESPN+

Game information

First quarter

- (10:39) MCNS TD – Elijah Mack 1-yard rush, Bailey Raborn kick
  McNeese State 7–0; Drive: 13 plays, 75 yards, 4:21
- (05:44) MCNS TD – Trevor Begue 31-yard pass from Cody Orgeron, Bailey Raborn kick
  McNeese State 14–0; Drive: 8 plays, 79 yards, 3:53
- (02:37) HBU TD – Trevor Larkin 5-yard pass from Bailey Zappe, Gino Garcia kick
  McNeese State 14–7; Drive: 9 plays, 71 yards, 2:59

Second quarter

- (14:48) MCNS TD – Cyron Sutton 68-yard pass from Cody Orgeron, Bailey Raborn kick
  McNeese State 21–7; Drive: 6 plays, 75 yards, 2:49
- (11:04) HBU TD – Ean Beek 15-yard pass from Bailey Zappe, Gino Garcia kick
  McNeese State 21–14; Drive: 11 plays, 75 yards, 3:44
- (06:03) MCNS TD – Jovon Burriss 11-yard fumble returned, Bailey Raborn kick
  McNeese State 28–14; Drive: 3 plays, -9 yards, 1:10
- (00:13) HBU TD – Jaylon Johnson 13-yard pass from Bailey Zappe, Gino Garcia PAT failed
  McNeese State 28–20; Drive: 13 plays, 80 yards, 2:37

Third quarter

- (01:59) MCNS TD – Justin Pratt 13-yard rush, Bailey Raborn kick
  McNeese State 35–20; Drive: 8 plays, 66 yards, 2:45

Fourth quarter

- (02:56) MCNS TD – Cody Orgeron 69-yard rush, Bailey Raborn kick
  McNeese State 42–20; Drive: 6 plays, 90 yards, 1:36
- (02:11) HBU TD – Ben Ratzlaff 2-yard pass from Bailey Zappe, Gino Garcia kick
  McNeese State 42–27; Drive: 4 plays, 75 yards, 0:45

Top passers

- MCNS – Cody Orgeron – 24/31, 303 yards, 2 TD, INT
- HBU – Bailey Zappe – 32/52, 317 yards, 4 TD, INT

Top rushers

- MCNS – Justin Pratt – 11 carries, 100 yards, TD
- HBU – Ean Beek – 13 carries, 52 yards

Top receivers

- MCNS – Trevor Begue – 9 receptions, 121 yards, TD
- HBU – Jaylon Johnson – 4 receptions, 90 yards, TD

Statistics	Houston Baptist	McNeese State
First downs	24	30
Total yards	347	567
Rushing yards	30	264
Passing yards	317	303
Turnovers	2	1
Time of possession	25:08	34:52

=== At Stephen F. Austin ===
McNeese State at Stephen F. Austin – Game summary

Quarter	1	2	3	4	Total
Cowboys	3	7	3	20	33
Lumberjacks	7	0	3	0	10

at Homer Bryce Stadium, Nacogdoches, TX

- Date: October 26
- Game time: 3:00 p.m. CST
- Game attendance: 8,335
- Referee: Christian Watso
- TV: ESPN+

Game information

First quarter

- (10:34) SFA TD – Josh McGowen 8-yard pass from Trae Self, Storm Ruiz kick
  Stephen F. Austin 7–0; Drive: 11 plays, 75 yards, 4:26
- (02:16) MCNS FG – Bailey Raborn 21-yard field goal
  Stephen F. Austin 7–3; Drive: 10 plays, 66 yards, 4:26

Second quarter

- (04:56) MCNS TD – Cyron Sutton 3-yard pass from Cody Orgeron, Bailey Raborn kick
  McNeese State 10–7; Drive: 9 plays, 38 yards, 2:40

Third quarter

- (06:13) MCNS FG – Bailey Raborn 39-yard field goal
  McNeese State 13–7; Drive: 10 plays, 47 yards, 4:20
- (00:18) SFA FG – Storm Ruiz 40-yard field goal
  McNeese State 13–10; Drive: 12 plays, 42 yards, 4:13

Fourth quarter

- (11:57) MCNS TD – Cody Orgeron 30-yard rush, Bailey Raborn kick
  McNeese State 20–10; Drive: 10 plays, 65 yards, 3:21
- (08:10) MCNS TD – Cyron Sutton 63-yard pass from Cody Orgeron, Bailey Raborn PAT failed
  McNeese State 26–10; Drive: 7 plays, 55 yards, 2:32
- (02:16) MCNS TD – Justin Pratt 21-yard rush, Bailey Raborn kick
  McNeese State 33–10; Drive: 9 plays, 73 yards, 3:55

Top passers

- MCNS – Cody Orgeron – 12/25, 162 yards, 2 TD
- SFA – Trae Self – 21/41, 175 yards, TD, INT

Top rushers

- MCNS – Justin Pratt – 21 carries, 133 yards, TD
- SFA – Josh McGowen – 12 carries, 46 yards

Top receivers

- MCNS – Cyron Sutton – 5 receptions, 55 yards, 2 TD
- SFA – Xavier Gipson – 6 receptions, 72 yards

Statistics	McNeese State	Stephen F. Austin
First downs	21	17
Total yards	408	254
Rushing yards	246	79
Passing yards	162	175
Turnovers	0	1
Time of possession	32:08	27:52

=== Northwestern State ===
Northwestern State at McNeese State – Game summary

Quarter	1	2	3	4	Total
Demons	10	7	3	0	20
Cowboys	6	3	8	13	30

at Cowboy Stadium, Lake Charles, LA

- Date: November 2
- Game time: 4:00 p.m. CST
- Game weather: 62 °F (17 °C); fair & cool
- Game attendance: 9,295
- Referee: Mike Defee
- TV: CST/ESPN+

Game information

First quarter

- (11:22) NSU TD – Justin West 9-yard rush, Daniel Justino kick
  Northwestern State 7–0; Drive: 8 plays, 53 yards, 2:41
- (11:09) MCNS TD – D'Andre Hicks 96-yard kickoff returned, Bailey Raborn PAT blocked
  Northwestern State 7–6; Drive: 0 plays, 0 yards, 0:00
- (03:07) NSU FG – Daniel Justino 37-yard field goal
  Northwestern State 10–6; Drive: 10 plays, 51 yards, 4:05

Second quarter

- (14:14) MCNS FG – Bailey Raborn 23-yard field goal
  Northwestern State 10–9; Drive: 7 plays, 24 yards, 2:46
- (10:27) NSU TD – Quan Shorts 22-yard pass from Shelton Eppler, Daniel Justino kick
  Northwestern State 17–9; Drive: 2 plays, 22 yards, 0:12

Third quarter

- (10:34) NSU FG – Daniel Justino 21-yard field goal
  Northwestern State 20–9; Drive: 11 plays, 71 yards, 4:26
- (02:45) MCNS TD – Trevor Begue 27-yard pass from Cody Orgeron, Cody Orgeron two-point conversion pass to J'Uan Gross
  Northwestern State 20–17; Drive: 4 plays, 54 yards, 1:21

Fourth quarter

- (14:57) MCNS TD – Trevor Begue 3-yard pass from Cody Orgeron, Bailey Raborn kick
  McNeese State 24–20; Drive: 6 plays, 17 yards, 2:41
- (08:14) MCNS FG – Bailey Raborn 20-yard field goal
  McNeese State 27–20; Drive: 9 plays, 56 yards, 4:52
- (01:06) MCNS FG – Bailey Raborn 29-yard field goal
  McNeese State 30–20; Drive: 4 plays, 5 yards, 0:58

Top passers

- MCNS – Cody Orgeron – 16/18, 191 yards, 2 TD
- NSU – Shelton Eppler – 28/53, 294 yards, TD, 2 INT

Top rushers

- MCNS – Justin Pratt – 29 carries, 87 yards
- NSU – Jared West – 8 carries, 31 yards, TD

Top receivers

- MCNS – Cyron Sutton – 7 receptions, 71 yards
- NSU – Akile Davis – 4 receptions, 73 yards

Statistics	Northwestern State	McNeese State
First downs	18	14
Total yards	314	308
Rushing yards	20	117
Passing yards	294	191
Turnovers	3	2
Time of possession	27:19	32:41

=== At Nicholls ===
McNeese State at Nicholls – Game summary

Quarter	1	2	3	4	Total
Cowboys	7	0	7	6	20
No. 24 Colonels	10	17	0	7	34

at Manning Field at John L. Guidry Stadium, Thibodaux, LA

- Date: November 16
- Game time: 3:00 p.m. CST
- Game weather: 63 °F (17 °C); clear
- Game attendance: 8,958
- Referee: Mike Vandervelde
- TV: CST

Game information

First quarter

- (11:57) NICH FG – Gavin Lasseigne 25-yard field goal
  Nicholls 3–0; Drive: 7 plays, 67 yards, 3:03
- (07:39) NICH TD – Dion Ray 55-yard pass from Chase Fourcade, Gavin Lasseigne kick
  Nicholls 10–0; Drive: 6 plays, 81 yards, 2:21
- (07:25) MCNS TD – Mason Pierce 95-yard kickoff returned, Bailey Raborn kick
  Nicholls 10–7; Drive: 0 plays, 0 yards, 0:00

Second quarter

- (14:08) NICH TD – Jordan Talley 14-yard pass from Chase Fourcade, Gavin Lasseigne kick
  Nicholls 17–7; Drive: 4 plays, 57 yards, 1:23
- (10:29) NICH TD – Dai'Jean Dixon 55-yard pass from Chase Fourcade, Gavin Lasseigne kick
  Nicholls 24–7; Drive: 2 plays, 55 yards, 0:13
- (00:04) NICH FG – Gavin Lasseigne 26-yard field goal
  Nicholls 27–7; Drive: 10 plays, 71 yards, 2:11

Third quarter

- (06:25) MCNS TD – Trevor Begue 5-yard pass from Cody Orgeron, Bailey Raborn kick
  Nicholls 27–14; Drive: 5 plays, 28 yards, 1:43

Fourth quarter

- (05:45) NICH TD – Julien Gums 2-yard rush, Gavin Lasseigne kick
  Nicholls 34–14; Drive: 11 plays, 88 yards, 6:27
- (03:09) MCNS TD – Draysean Hudson 4-yard pass from Cody Orgeron, Bailey Raborn PAT blocked
  Nicholls 34–20; Drive: 11 plays, 91 yards, 2:31

Top passers

- NICH – Chase Fourcade – 21/35, 374 yards, 3 TD, INT
- MCNS – Cody Orgeron – 18/36, 184 yards, 2 TD

Top rushers

- NICH – Julien Gums – 17 carries, 56 yards, TD
- MCNS – Justin Pratt – 10 carries, 24 yards

Top receivers

- NICH – Dai'Jean Dixon – 7 receptions, 185 yards, TD
- MCNS – Trevor Begue – 6 receptions, 67 yard, TD

Statistics	McNeese State	Nicholls
First downs	14	24
Total yards	236	519
Rushing yards	52	145
Passing yards	184	374
Turnovers	1	2
Time of possession	27:12	32:48

=== At Lamar ===
McNeese State at Lamar – Game summary

Quarter	1	2	3	4	Total
Cowboys	7	0	0	20	27
Cardinals	0	0	0	3	3

at Provost Umphrey Stadium, Beaumont, TX

- Date: November 23
- Game time: 3:00 p.m. CST
- Game weather: 62 °F (17 °C); clear skies
- Game attendance: 7,307
- Referee: Dan Lewis
- TV: ESPN3

Game information

First quarter

- (13:03) MCNS TD – Trevor Begue 54-yard TD pass from Cody Orgeron, Bailey Raborn kick
  McNeese State 7–0; Drive: 3 plays, 66 yards, 0:39

Fourth quarter

- (14:09) LAMR FG – Bailey Griffen 39-yard field goal
  McNeese State 7–3; Drive: 11 plays, 58 yards, 4:55
- (12:15) MCNS TD – JCody Orgeron 41-yard rush, Bailey Raborn kick
  McNeese State 14–3; Drive: 5 plays, 75 yards, 1:54
- (09:26) MCNS TD – Justin Pratt 1-yard rush, Bailey Raborn PAT failed
  McNeese State 20–3; Drive: 5 plays, 49 yards, 2:14
- (05:14) MCNS TD – Justin Pratt 1-yard rush, Bailey Raborn kick
  McNeese State 27–3; Drive: 6 plays, 53 yards, 2:11

Top passers

- MCNS – Cody Orgeron – 14/22, 238 yards, TD, 2 INT
- LAMR – Shane Johnson – 6/16, 110 yards

Top rushers

- MCNS – Justin Pratt – 27 carries, 206 yards, 2 TD
- LAMR – Chaz Ward – 15 carries, 33 yards

Top receivers

- MCNS – Trevor Begue – 5 receptions, 105 yards, TD
- LAMR – Kenny Allen – reception, 45 yards

Statistics	McNeese State	Lamar
First downs	19	11
Total yards	518	210
Rushing yards	280	96
Passing yards	238	114
Turnovers	2	1
Time of possession	30:34	29:26

== Ranking movements ==
Ranking movements Legend: RV = Received votes
	Week													
Poll	Pre	1	2	3	4	5	6	7	8	9	10	11	12	Final
STATS FCS	RV													
Coaches	RV													

== Roster ==
2019 McNeese State Cowboys football team roster
Players
Coaches
Offense

Pos.	#	Name	Class
WR	1	Cyron Sutton	Jr
QB	2	Cade Bartlett	Fr
WR	3	Davion Curtis	Jr
RB	4	Elijah Mack	Jr
WR	5	Rashid Bonnette	Sr
QB	8	Cody Orgeron	Jr
QB	10	Matt Keller	Jr
QB	12	Matt Gardner	So
WR	13	Nate Briscoe	So
WR	14	Draysean Hudson	Jr
WR	15	Zach Hayes	Fr
WR	19	Tyler Washington	Fr
WR	20	Justin Pratt	Sr
RB	22	D'Andre Hicks	So
RB	33	J'Uan Gross	So
RB	34	J'Cobi Skinner	So
TE	36	Dontay Hargrove	Jr
RB	37	Carlos Williams	Fr
TE	40	Dominic Prudhomme	Fr
TE	44	Jacob Logan	Jr
RB	47	McCaylon Thibeaux	Fr
OL	53	Kyle Herridge	So
OL	55	Cutter Leftwich	So
OL	57	Aaron McDaniel	Fr
OL	58	Tanner Pugh	So
OL	61	Collin Fountain	Jr
OL	62	Joe Latronico	Jr
OL	63	Charley Zeno	Fr
OL	64	Jack Zelezinski	Fr
OL	66	Juwan Felix	Fr
OL	68	Caleb Gary	Jr
OL	70	Grant Burguillos	Sr
OL	71	Jamarius Bolding	Jr
OL	72	Tre Newton	Sr
OL	73	Calvin Barkat	So
OL	74	Blaise Scriber	Sr
OL	75	Zach Jones	Sr
OL	77	DeMarcus Thomas	Fr
OL	78	Hayden Shaw	Fr
OL	79	Nick Holiday	Fr
TE	80	Louis Conerly	Sr
WR	81	Deon Cormier	Fr
WR	83	Trevor Begue	Jr
TE	84	KJ Brown	Fr
WR	86	Markel Cotten	Fr
WR	87	Markquell Stewart	Fr
WR	88	Tylin Bryant	Fr
WR	89	Mason Pierce	Fr
QB		Morgan Clark	Fr
RB		Ivory Roberts	Fr

Defense

Pos.	#	Name	Class
DB	1	Darion Dunn	Jr
DB	2	Cory McCoy	Jr
DB	4	Colby Burton	Sr
DB	5	Jovon Burriss	Sr
DB	6	Calum Foster	Sr
DB	7	Gabe Foster	Jr
DL	8	Damien DeGruy	So
DL	9	Cody Roscoe	Jr
LB	10	Darius Daniels	So
LB	11	Kody Fulp	So
DB	16	Colby Richardson	So
DB	17	Darius Johnson	Jr
DB	18	Eli Johnson	Fr
DB	21	Andre Sam	So
LB	23	Kordell Williams	So
DB	25	Darius Shields	Fr
LB	26	Keshon Bell	So
DB	27	Enos Lewis	So
DB	28	Andrew Croker	Fr
LB	29	Jake LaFleur	Fr
DE	30	Marcus Foster	Sr
LB	31	Dorion Pollard	Jr
LB	32	Carlos Scott	Jr
DB	35	Anthony Johnson	Fr
LB	41	Eric Rene	Fr
DE	42	Earenest Grayson, III	Fr
LB	43	Tyrell Flugence	Fr
LB	45	Tahj Samuel	Fr
LB	48	Andrew Hyacinth	Jr
DE	49	Chris Livings	Sr
DL	54	Jonathon Hageon	Fr
LB	56	Brayden Adams	Fr
DL	90	Jonta Jones	Sr
DL	91	Tyrique Gibson	So
DL	92	Arthur Lott	Fr
DL	93	Steven Conerly	So
DL	94	Kaleb Wenson	Fr
DL	95	Chase Davis	So
DL	96	C. J. Semien	So
DL	97	Camron Peterson	So
DE	98	Logan Sonnier	Fr
DL	99	Marval Bourgeois	Sr
LB		Trey Clark	Fr
LB		Blake Robinson	Fr

Special teams

Pos.	#	Name	Class
K	11	Kade Dixon	So
K	26	Eric Martin	Fr
P	38	Bailey Raborn	Jr
LS	39	Jake Smith	Sr
LS	51	Trey Vondenstein	Fr
LS	65	Chandler Perer	Fr

Head coach

- Sterlin Gilbert (Angelo State)

Coordinators/assistant coaches

- Matt Mattox (Houston)
  Offensive coordinator/offensive line
- Jim Gush (Bucknell)
  Defensive coordinator
- Landon Hoefer (Texas Tech)
  Running backs
- Ben Olson (Eastern Illinois)
  Defensive line
- Marcus Walker (Oklahoma)
  Co-defensive backs
- Nick Graham (Tulsa)
  Co-defensive backs
- Cris Dishman (Purdue)
  Safeties
- Brody Trahan (Baylor)
  Linebackers
- Derek Shay (Eastern Illinois)
  Tight ends
- Lanear Sampson (Baylor)
  Co-wide receivers
- Jeff Lepak (Eastern Illinois)
  Co-wide receivers
- Kyle Washington (Angelo State)
  Offensive quality control
- Zach Colvin (Bowling Green)
  Defensive quality control

Legend

- (C) Team captain
- (S) Suspended
- (I) Ineligible
- Injured
- Redshirt

Roster
Last update: April 25, 2020
