= 2019 Northwestern State Demons football team =

American college football season

2019 Northwestern State Demons football
- Conference: Southland Conference
- Record: 3–9 (3–6 Southland)
- Head coach: Brad Laird (2nd season)
- Offensive coordinator: Brad Smiley (2nd season)
- Offensive scheme: Spread
- Defensive coordinator: Mike Lucas (3rd season)
- Base defense: 3–4
- Home stadium: Harry Turpin Stadium

2019 Southland Conference football standings
	Conf.			Overall
Team	W		L	W		L
No. 14 Nicholls +^	7	–	2	8	–	4
No. 11 Central Arkansas +^	7	–	2	9	–	3
No. 19 Southeastern Louisiana ^	6	–	3	8	–	5
Sam Houston State	6	–	3	7	–	5
McNeese State	5	–	4	7	–	5
Incarnate Word	4	–	5	5	–	7
Abilene Christian	4	–	5	5	–	7
Northwestern State	3	–	6	3	–	9
Stephen F. Austin	3	–	6	3	–	9
Houston Baptist	2	–	6	5	–	7
Lamar	2	–	7	4	–	8
+ – Conference co-champions; ^ – FCS playoff participant; Rankings from STATS poll

The 2019 Northwestern State Demons football team represented Northwestern State University as a member of the Southland Conference during the 2019 NCAA Division I FCS football season. Led by second-year head coach Brad Laird, the Demons compiled an overall record of 3–9 with a mark of 3–6 in conference play, tying for eighth place in the Southland. Northwestern State played home games at Harry Turpin Stadium in Natchitoches, Louisiana.

== Preseason ==
=== Preseason poll ===
The Southland Conference released their preseason poll on July 18, 2019. The Demons were picked to finish in tenth place.

=== Preseason All–Southland Teams ===
The Demons placed four players on the preseason all–Southland teams.

Offense

2nd team

Chris Zirkle – OL

Defense

1st team

Hayden Bourgeois – DB

2nd team

O'Shea Jackson – DL

Myles Ward – KR

== Schedule ==
Date	Time	Opponent	Site	TV	Result	Attendance
August 29	6:30 p.m.	at UT Martin*	Graham Stadium; Martin, TN	ESPN+	L 20–42	3,008
September 7	6:00 p.m.	Midwestern State*	Harry Turpin Stadium; Natchitoches, LA	DemonTV	L 7–33	7,010
September 14	6:30 p.m.	at No. 4 (FBS) LSU*	Tiger Stadium; Baton Rouge, LA	SECN	L 14–65	100,334
September 21	6:00 p.m.	at Houston Baptist	Husky Stadium; Houston, TX	ESPN3	L 21–48	1,941
September 28	6:00 p.m.	No. 19 Southeastern Louisiana	Harry Turpin Stadium; Natchitoches, LA (rivalry)	CST/ESPN+	L 27–44	7,584
October 12	3:00 p.m.	at No. 12 Nicholls	John L. Guidry Stadium; Thibodaux, LA (NSU Challenge)	CST/ESPN+	L 35–45	8,103
October 19	6:00 p.m.	No. 13 Central Arkansas^{†}	Harry Turpin Stadium; Natchitoches, LA	CST/ESPN+	L 30–31	7,584
October 26	4:00 p.m.	at Incarnate Word	Gayle and Tom Benson Stadium; San Antonio, TX	UIWtv	W 44–41 ^{OT}	3,373
November 2	4:00 p.m.	at McNeese State	Cowboy Stadium; Lake Charles, LA (rivalry)	CST/ESPN+	L 20–30	9,295
November 9	6:00 p.m.	Lamar	Harry Turpin Stadium; Natchitoches, LA	CST/ESPN+	W 34–13	5,122
November 16	2:00 p.m.	at Sam Houston State	Bowers Stadium; Huntsville, TX	ESPN+	W 31–28	4,280
November 21	6:00 p.m.	Stephen F. Austin	Harry Turpin Stadium; Natchitoches, LA (Chief Caddo)	DemonTV	L 20–32	5,822
*Non-conference game; ^{†}Homecoming; Rankings from STATS Poll released prior to the game; All times are in Central time

== Game summaries ==
=== At UT Martin ===
Statistics	Northwestern State	UT Martin
First downs	28	17
Total yards	483	309
Rushing yards	96	179
Passing yards	387	130
Turnovers	2	1
Time of possession	35:53	24:07

Northwestern State at Tennessee–Martin – Game summary

Quarter	1	2	3	4	Total
Demons	7	13	0	0	20
Skyhawks	14	0	14	14	42

at Graham Stadium, Martin, TN

- Date: August 29
- Game time: 6:30 p.m. CST
- Game weather: 80 °F (27 °C); sunny
- Game attendance: 3,008
- Referee: Drew Myers
- TV: ESPN+

Game information

First quarter

- (09:53) NSU TD – Quan Shorts 14-yard pass from Shelton Eppler, Scotty Roblow kick
  Northwestern State 7–0; Drive: 10 plays, 88 yards, 5:07
- (06:02) UTM TD – Colton Dowell 39-yard pass from John Bachus III, Ryan Courtright kick
  Tied 7–7; Drive: 8 plays, 78 yards, 3:46
- (02:17) UTM TD – Jaylon Moore 43-yard pass from John Bachus III, Ryan Courtright kick
  Tennessee–Martin 14–7; Drive: 4 plays, 58 yards, 2:11

Second quarter

- (11:11) NSU TD – Quan Shorts 7-yard pass from Shelton Eppler, Scotty Roblow kick
  Tied 14–14; Drive: 14 plays, 75 yards, 6:06
- (06:35) NSU TD – Corey Smallwood 26-yard pass from Shelton Eppler, Scotty Roblow PAT failed
  Northwestern State 20–14; Drive: 7 plays, 62 yards, 3:02

Third quarter

- (04:22) UTM TD – Payton Logan 21-yard rush, Ryan Courtright kick
  Tennessee–Martin 21–20; Drive: 2 plays, 25 yards, 0:42
- (02:13) UTM TD – Terry Williams 55-yard punt returned, Ryan Courtright kick
  Tennessee–Martin 28–20; Drive: 3 plays, 6 yards, 2:04

Fourth quarter

- (05:06) UTM TD – Wanya Moton 78-yard interception returned, Ryan Courtright kick
  Tennessee–Martin 35–20; Drive: 7 plays, 40 yards, 2:18
- (02:53) UTM TD – Payton Logan 53-yard rush, Ryan Courtright kick
  Tennessee–Martin 42–20; Drive: 2 plays, 53 yards, 0:54

Top passers

- NSU – Shelton Eppler – 43/62, 387 yards, 3 TD, INT
- UTM – John Bachus III – 8/20, 130 yards, 2 TD, INT

Top rushers

- NSU – Shelton Eppler – 9 carries, 45 yards
- UTM – Payton Logan – 13 carries, 149 yards, 2 TD

Top receivers

- NSU – Quan Shorts – 12 receptions, 111 yards, 2 TD
- UTM – Jaylon Moore – 1 reception, 43 yards, TD

=== Midwestern State ===
Statistics	Midwestern State	Northwestern State
First downs	22	14
Total yards	425	243
Rushing yards	102	58
Passing yards	323	185
Turnovers	0	1
Time of possession	33:35	26:25

Midwestern State at Northwestern State – Game summary

Quarter	1	2	3	4	Total
No. 20 (DII) Mustangs	13	13	0	7	33
Demons	0	7	0	0	7

at Harry Turpin Stadium, Natchitoches, LA

- Date: September 7
- Game time: 6:00 p.m. CST
- Game weather: 102 °F (39 °C); hot
- Game attendance: 7,010
- Referee: Mike Cuttone

Game information

First quarter

- (05:50) MID TD – Tyrique Edwards 38-yard pass from Zach Purceli, Jacob Rowland PAT blocked
  Midwestern State 6–0; Drive: 5 plays, 80 yards, 2:15
- (01:03) MID TD – Kylan Harrison 25-yard pass from Zach Purceli, Jacob Rowland kick
  Midwestern State 13–0; Drive: 6 plays, 55 yards, 3:01

Second quarter

- (08:25) MID FG – Jaron Imbriani 28-yard field goal
  Midwestern State 16–0; Drive: 12 plays, 55 yards, 5:45
- (05:35) MID FG – Jaron Imbriani 25-yard field goal
  Midwestern State 19–0; Drive: 7 plays, 48 yards, 1:53
- (01:07) NSU TD – Jared West 10-yard rush, Scotty Roblow kick
  Midwestern State 19–7; Drive: 12 plays, 75 yards, 4:28
- (00:00) MID TD – Juwan Johnson 32-yard pass from Zach Purceli, Jaron Imbriani kick
  Midwestern State 26–7; Drive: 3 plays, 32 yards, 0:13

Fourth quarter

- (11:05) MID TD – Zach Purceli 7-yard rush, Jaron Imbriani kick
  Midwestern State 33–7; Drive: 9 plays, 70 yards, 4:18

Top passers

- MID – Zach Purceli – 26/40, 323 yards, 3 TD
- NSU – Shelton Eppler – 28/42, 177 yards, INT

Top rushers

- MID – Lazarus Fisher – 15 carries, 69 yards
- NSU – Jared West – 10 carries, 27 yards, TD

Top receivers

- MID – Tyrique Edwards – 5 receptions, 76 yards, TD
- NSU – Quan Shorts – 8 receptions, 60 yards

=== At LSU ===
Statistics	Northwestern State	LSU
First downs	15	31
Total yards	278	610
Rushing yards	46	122
Passing yards	232	488
Turnovers	0	1
Time of possession	33:38	26:22

Northwestern State at Louisiana State – Game summary

Quarter	1	2	3	4	Total
Demons	7	7	0	0	14
No. 4 (FBS) Tigers	3	21	27	14	65

at Tiger Stadium, Baton Rouge, LA

- Date: September 14
- Game time: 6:30 p.m. CST
- Game weather: 87 °F (31 °C); partly cloudy
- Game attendance: 100,334
- Referee: Lee Hedrick
- TV: SEC Network

Game information

First quarter

- (05:30) LSU FG – Cade York 26-yard field goal
  LSU 3–0; Drive: 10 plays, 57 yards, 4:19
- (00:16) NSU TD – Quan Shorts 17-yard pass from Shelton Eppler, Scotty Roblow kick
  Northwestern State 7–3; Drive: 8 plays, 75 yards, 5:14

Second quarter

- (12:38) LSU TD – Clyde Edwards-Helaire 4-yard rush, Cade York kick
  LSU 10–7; Drive: 8 plays, 69 yards, 2:38
- (08:50) LSU TD – Terrace Marshall Jr. 14-yard pass from Joe Burrow, Cade York kick
  LSU 17–7; Drive: 7 plays, 77 yards, 2:44
- (05:38) NSU TD – David Fitzwater 26-yard pass from Shelton Eppler, Scotty Roblow kick
  LSU 17–14; Drive: 6 plays, 75 yards, 3:12
- (03:27) LSU TD – Clyde Edwards-Helaire 3-yard rush, Cade York kick
  LSU 24–14; Drive: 6 plays, 70 yards, 2:11

Third quarter

- (13:19) LSU TD – Joe Burrow 5-yard rush, Cade York PAT failed
  LSU 30–14; Drive: 4 plays, 74 yards, 1:41
- (09:36) LSU TD – Terrace Marshall Jr. 6-yard pass from Joe Burrow, Cade York kick
  LSU 37–14; Drive: 7 plays, 33 yards, 2:28
- (06:26) LSU TD – John Emery Jr. 4-yard rush, Cade York kick
  LSU 44–14; Drive: 4 plays, 78 yards, 1:32
- (02:16) LSU TD – Tyrion Davis-Price 1-yard rush, Cade York kick
  LSU 51–14; Drive: 8 plays, 69 yards, 2:38

Fourth quarter

- (07:22) LSU TD – Trey Palmer 54-yard punt returned, Cade York kick
  LSU 58–14; Drive: 3 plays, 2 yards, 2:33
- (02:12) LSU TD – Tyrion Davis-Price 2-yard rush, Cade York kick
  LSU 65–14; Drive: 7 plays, 62 yards, 3:23

Top passers

- NSU – Shelton Eppler – 21/38, 225 yards, 2 TD
- LSU – Joe Burrow – 21/24, 373 yards, 2 TD, INT

Top rushers

- NSU – Stadford Anderson – 9 carries, 40 yards
- LSU – Clyde Edwards-Helaire – 13 carries, 50 yards, 2 TD

Top receivers

- NSU – David Fitzwater – 3 receptions, 68 yards, TD
- LSU – Justin Jefferson – 5 receptions, 124 yards

=== At Houston Baptist ===
Statistics	Northwestern State	Houston Baptist
First downs	25	27
Total yards	447	532
Rushing yards	146	266
Passing yards	301	266
Turnovers	3	1
Time of possession	30:36	29:24

Northwestern State at Houston Baptist – Game summary

Quarter	1	2	3	4	Total
Demons	0	0	14	7	21
Huskies	14	10	17	7	48

at Husky Stadium, Houston, TX

- Date: September 21
- Game time: 6:00 p.m. CST
- Game weather: 86 °F (30 °C); sunny, some clouds
- Game attendance: 1,941
- Referee: Ed Bourgeois
- TV: ESPN3

Game information

First quarter

- (13:05) HBU TD – Jerreth Sterns 12-yard pass from Bailey Zappe, Gino Garcia kick
  Houston Baptist 7–0; Drive: 5 plays, 64 yards, 1:00
- (08:28) HBU TD – Ean Beek 52-yard rush, Gino Garcia kick
  Houston Baptist 14–0; Drive: 5 plays, 74 yards, 1:46

Second quarter

- (13:08) HBU TD – Dreshawn Minnieweather 4-yard pass from Bailey Zappe, Gino Garcia kick
  Houston Baptist 21–0; Drive: 9 plays, 52 yards, 2:53
- (00:48) HBU FG – Gino Garcia 33-yard field goal
  Houston Baptist 24–0; Drive: 10 plays, 36 yards, 3:31

Third quarter

- (11:58) HBU TD – Ben Ratzlaff 9-yard pass from Jerreth Sterns, Gino Garcia kick
  Houston Baptist 31–0; Drive: 9 plays, 52 yards, 2:53
- (08:36) NSU TD – Jared West 7-yard rush, Ryan Gremillion kick
  Houston Baptist 31–7; Drive: 11 plays, 75 yards, 3:22
- (07:40) HBU TD – Ben Ratzlaff 66-yard pass from Bailey Zappe, Gino Garcia kick
  Houston Baptist 38–7; Drive: 2 plays, 70 yards, 0:41
- (05:20) NSU TD – Akile Davis 30-yard pass from Shelton Eppler, Ryan Gremillion kick
  Houston Baptist 38–14; Drive: 7 plays, 79 yards, 2:14
- (01:15) HBU FG – Gino Garcia 51-yard field goal
  Houston Baptist 41–14; Drive: 10 plays, 42 yards, 4:05

Fourth quarter

- (14:06) NSU TD – Akile Davis 26-yard pass from Shelton Eppler, Ryan Gremillion kick
  Houston Baptist 41–21; Drive: 7 plays, 75 yards, 2:09
- (09:57) HBU TD – Coleman Robinson 2-yard pass from Bailey Zappe, Gino Garcia kick
  Houston Baptist 48–21; Drive: 9 plays, 61 yards, 4:02

Top passers

- NSU – Shelton Eppler – 26/42, 287 yards, 2 TD, 3 INT
- HBU – Bailey Zappe – 22/37, 257 yards, 4 TD, INT

Top rushers

- NSU – Jared West – 17 carries, 80 yards, TD
- HBU – Ean Beek – 17 carries, 131 yards, TD

Top receivers

- NSU – Akile Davis – 3 receptions, 68 yards, 2 TD
- HBU – Ben Ratzlaff – 5 receptions, 117 yards, 2 TD

=== Southeastern Louisiana ===
Statistics	Southeastern Louisiana	Northwestern State
First downs	26	27
Total yards	537	378
Rushing yards	143	45
Passing yards	394	333
Turnovers	2	0
Time of possession	30:30	29:30

Southeastern Louisiana at Northwestern State – Game summary

Quarter	1	2	3	4	Total
No. 19 Lions	10	7	20	7	44
Demons	7	10	3	7	27

at Harry Turpin Stadium, Natchitoches, LA

- Date: September 28
- Game time: 6:00 p.m. CST
- Game weather: 87 °F (31 °C); sunny and warm
- Game attendance: 7,584
- Referee: Ed Bourgeois
- TV: CST

Game information

First quarter

- (09:18) SELA FG – Bryce Broussard 34-yard field goal
  Southeastern Louisiana 3–0; Drive: 8 plays, 65 yards, 3:44
- (07:16) NSU TD – Quan Shorts 26-yard pass from Shelton Eppler, Ryan Gremillion kick
  Northwestern State 7–3; Drive: 5 plays, 61 yards, 1:54
- (03:49) SELA TD – Austin Mitchell 35-yard pass from Chason Virgil, Bryce Broussard kick
  Southeastern Louisiana 10–7; Drive: 8 plays, 85 yards, 3:27

Second quarter

- (09:17) NSU TD – Kendrick Price 19-yard pass from Shelton Eppler, Ryan Gremillion kick
  Northwestern State 14–10; Drive: 3 plays, 20 yards, 0:47
- (04:43) SELA TD – Cole Kelley 1-yard rush, Bryce Broussard kick
  Southeastern Louisiana 17–14; Drive: 10 plays, 71 yards, 4:27
- (00:00) NSU FG – Ryan Gremillion 24-yard field goal
  Tied 17–17; Drive: 15 plays, 72 yards, 4:37

Third quarter

- (09:12) NSU FG – Ryan Gremillion 25-yard field goal
  Northwestern State 20–17; Drive: 7 plays, 53 yards, 2:15
- (07:07) SELA TD – Taron Jones 5-yard rush, Bryce Broussard kick
  Southeastern Louisiana 24–20; Drive: 6 plays, 67 yards, 2:02
- (05:59) SELA TD – CJ Turner 46-yard pass from Cole Kelley, Bryce Broussard kick
  Southeastern Louisiana 31–20; Drive: 1 play, 42 yards, 0:07
- (00:52) SELA TD – Kendall Collins Jr. 25-yard rush, Bryce Broussard PAT failed
  Southeastern Louisiana 37–20; Drive: 8 plays, 86 yards, 3:51

Fourth quarter

- (04:30) NSU TD – Quan Shorts 17-yard pass from Shelton Eppler, Ryan Gremillion kick
  Southeastern Louisiana 37–27; Drive: 10 plays, 72 yards, 4:13
- (00:48) SELA TD – Taron Jones 2-yard rush, Bryce Broussard kick
  Southeastern Louisiana 44–27; Drive: 8 plays, 73 yards, 3:42

Top passers

- SELA – Chason Virgil – 24/32, 344 yards, TD
- NSU – Shelton Eppler – 35/55, 333 yards, 3 TD

Top rushers

- SELA – Taron Jones – 18 carries, 108 yards, 2 TD
- NSU – Jared West – 13 carries, 24 yards

Top receivers

- SELA – CJ Turner – 7 receptions, 128 yards, TD
- NSU – Quan Shorts – 11 receptions, 110 yards, 2 TD

=== At Nicholls ===
Statistics	Northwestern State	Nicholls
First downs	21	30
Total yards	428	537
Rushing yards	41	349
Passing yards	387	188
Turnovers	1	1
Time of possession	22:32	37:28

Northwestern State at Nicholls – Game summary

Quarter	1	2	3	4	Total
Demons	0	7	14	14	35
No. 12 Colonels	14	10	7	14	45

at Manning Field at John L. Guidry Stadium, Thibodaux, LA

- Date: October 12
- Game time: 3:00 p.m. CST
- Game weather: 70 °F (21 °C); overcast
- Game attendance: 8,103
- Referee: Dan Lewis
- TV: CST

Game information

First quarter

- (12:25) NICH TD – Chase Fourcade 13-yard rush, Gunnar Jones kick
  Nicholls 7–0; Drive: 4 plays, 32 yards, 1:50
- (01:33) NICH TD – Dontrell Taylor 1-yard rush, Gunnar Jones kick
  Nicholls 14–0; Drive: 12 plays, 74 yards, 6:43

Second quarter

- (14:56) NSU TD – Jared West 1-yard rush, Ryan Gremillion kick
  Nicholls 14–7; Drive: 5 plays, 75 yards, 1:37
- (04:57) NICH TD – Chase Fourcade 29-yard rush, Gunnar Jones kick
  Nicholls 21–7; Drive: 11 plays, 77 yards, 5:15
- (00:00) NICH FG – Gunnar Jones 20-yard field goal
  Nicholls 24–7; Drive: 8 plays, 60 yards, 3:21

Third quarter

- (11:27) NICH TD – Julien Gumms 10-yard pass from Chase Fourcade, Gunnar Jones kick
  Nicholls 31–7; Drive: 7 plays, 33 yards, 3:21
- (10:13) NSU TD – Quan Shorts 23-yard pass from Shelton Eppler, Ryan Gremillion kick
  Nicholls 31–14; Drive: 4 plays, 69 yards, 1:09
- (03:12) NSU TD – Gavin Landry 6-yard pass from Shelton Eppler, Ryan Gremillion kick
  Nicholls 31–21; Drive: 7 plays, 67 yards, 2:40

Fourth quarter

- (14:23) NICH TD – Dontrell Taylor 27-yard rush, Gunnar Jones kick
  Nicholls 38–21; Drive: 8 plays, 75 yards, 3:49
- (10:09) NSU TD – Akile Davis 9-yard pass from Shelton Eppler, Ryan Gremillion kick
  Nicholls 38–28; Drive: 8 plays, 75 yards, 4:08
- (02:31) NICH TD – Dontrell Taylor 3-yard rush, Gunnar Jones kick
  Nicholls 45–28; Drive: 8 plays, 62 yards, 3:32
- (00:32) NSU TD – Quan Shorts 1-yard pass from Shelton Eppler, Ryan Gremillion kick
  Nicholls 45–35; Drive: 7 plays, 77 yards, 1:51

Top passers

- NSU – Shelton Eppler – 27/37, 387 yards, 4 TD
- NICH – Chase Fourcade – 20/29, 188 yards, TD, INT

Top rushers

- NSU – Jared West – 10 carries, 33 yards, TD
- NICH – Chase Fourcade – 14 carries, 135 yards, 2 TD

Top receivers

- NSU – Akile Davis – 7 receptions, 155 yards, TD
- NICH – Tahj Smith – 4 receptions, 70 yards

=== Central Arkansas ===
Statistics	Central Arkansas	Northwestern State
First downs	23	22
Total yards	388	406
Rushing yards	89	96
Passing yards	299	310
Turnovers	4	2
Time of possession	30:42	29:18

Central Arkansas at Northwestern State – Game summary

Quarter	1	2	3	4	Total
No. 13 Bears	7	7	10	7	31
Demons	14	10	0	6	30

at Harry Turpin Stadium, Natchitoches, LA

- Date: October 19
- Game time: 6:00 p.m. CST
- Game weather: 80 °F (27 °C); sunny
- Game attendance: 7,584
- Referee: Christian Watso
- TV: CST

Game information

First quarter

- (10:07) NSU TD – Jared West 2-yard rush, Ryan Gremillion kick
  Northwestern State 7–0; Drive: 12 plays, 73 yards, 4:53
- (08:26) NSU TD – Gavin Landry 54-yard pass from Shelton Eppler, Ryan Gremillion kick
  Northwestern State 14–0; Drive: 3 plays, 57 yards, 0:53
- (04:59) UCA TD – Carlos Blackman 14-yard rush, Hayden Ray kick
  Northwestern State 14–7; Drive: 9 plays, 75 yards, 3:27

Second quarter

- (12:10) NSU TD – Jared West 12-yard pass from Shelton Eppler, Ryan Gremillion kick
  Northwestern State 21–7; Drive: 7 plays, 30 yards, 2:50
- (07:32) UCA TD – Joshua Nix 2-yard pass from Breylin Smith, Hayden Ray kick
  Northwestern State 21–14; Drive: 7 plays, 70 yards, 4:24
- (01:22) NSU FG – Ryan Gremillion 22-yard field goal
  Northwestern State 24–14; Drive: 10 plays, 54 yards, 4:02

Third quarter

- (11:21) UCA FG – Hayden Ray 28-yard field goal
  Northwestern State 24–17; Drive: 9 plays, 60 yards, 3:33
- (10:24) UCA TD – Carlos Blackman 5-yard pass from Breylin Smith, Hayden Ray kick
  Tied 24–24; Drive: 5 plays, 43 yards, 0:56

Fourth quarter

- (13:20) UCA TD – Lujuan Winingham 25-yard pass from Breylin Smith, Hayden Ray kick
  Central Arkansas 31–24; Drive: 4 plays, 33 yards, 1:22
- (01:30) NSU TD – Akile Davis 9-yard pass from Shelton Eppler, two-point pass conversion attempt failed
  Central Arkansas 31–30; Drive: 11 plays, 70 yards, 3:09

Top passers

- UCA – Breylin Smith – 30/43, 299 yards, 3 TD, 2 INT
- NSU – Shelton Eppler – 26/49, 310 yards, 3 TD, 2 INT

Top rushers

- UCA – Carlos Blackman – 11 carries, 44 yards, TD
- NSU – Jared West – 13 carries, 56 yards, TD

Top receivers

- UCA – Lujuan Winningham – 9 receptions, 168 yards, TD
- NSU – Quan Shorts – 11 receptions, 106 yards

=== At Incarnate Word ===
Statistics	Northwestern State	Incarnate Word
First downs	19	28
Total yards	358	422
Rushing yards	99	147
Passing yards	259	275
Turnovers	2	3
Time of possession	29:20	30:40

Northwestern State at Incarnate Word – Game summary

Quarter	1	2	3	4	OT	Total
Demons	7	9	7	15	6	44
No. 20 Cardinals	7	10	14	7	3	41

at Gayle and Tom Benson Stadium, San Antonio, TX

- Date: October 26
- Game time: 4:00 p.m. CST
- Game weather: 73 °F (23 °C); sunny
- Game attendance: 3,373
- Referee: Vidal Jones

Game information

First quarter

- (08:49) NSU TD – Jared West 3-yard rush, Ryan Gremillion kick
  Northwestern State 7–0; Drive: 11 plays, 55 yards, 5:25
- (04:40) UIW TD – Jon Copeland 4-yard rush, Carson Mohr kick
  Tied 7–7; Drive: 10 plays, 81 yards, 3:58

Second quarter

- (13:34) UIW FG – Carson Mohr 46-yard field goal
  Incarnate Word 10–7; Drive: 10 plays, 39 yards, 4:32
- (11:33) UIW TD – Keyondrick Philio 3-yard rush, Carson Mohr kick
  Incarnate Word 17–7; Drive: 6 plays, 27 yards, 1:56
- (07:27) NSU TD – Jared West 2-yard rush, Ryan Gremillion PAT failed
  Incarnate Word 17–13; Drive: 9 plays, 70 yards, 4:01
- (00:00) NSU FG – Daniel Justino 29-yard field goal
  Incarnate Word 17–16; Drive: 8 plays, 37 yards, 1:01

Third quarter

- (13:46) UIW TD – Jerick Pitre 32-yard interception returned, Carson Mohr kick
  Incarnate Word 24–16; Drive: 3 plays, -2 yards, 1:14
- (09:23) UIW TD – Mark Sullivan 39-yard pass from Jon Copeland, Carson Mohr kick
  Incarnate Word 31–16; Drive: 7 plays, 67 yards, 2:44
- (06:31) NSU TD – Stadford Anderson 2-yard rush, Daniel Justino kick
  Incarnate Word 31–23; Drive: 2 plays, 6 yards, 0:21

Fourth quarter

- (08:27) NSU TD – Jared West 5-yard rush, Daniel Justino kick
  Incarnate Word 31–30; Drive: 13 plays, 72 yards, 7:46
- (02:42) UIW TD – Brady Rogers 8-yard pass from Jon Copeland, Carson Mohr kick
  Incarnate Word 38–30; Drive: 12 plays, 82 yards, 5:37
- (00:19) NSU TD – Tanner Ash 19-yard pass from Shelton Eppler, Shelton Eppler two-point conversion pass to Akile Davis
  Tied 38–38; Drive: 12 plays, 75 yards, 2:23

First overtime

- UIW FG – Carson Mohr 26-yard field goal
  Incarnate Word 41–38; Drive: 16 plays, 0 yards, 0:13
- NSU TD – Quan Shorts 1-yard pass from Shelton Eppler
  Northwestern State 44–41; Drive: 16 plays, 0 yards, 0:13

Top passers

- NSU – Shelton Eppler – 30/40, 259 yards, 2 TD, INT
- UIW – Jon Copeland – 27/36, 275 yards, 2 TD, INT

Top rushers

- NSU – Stadford Anderson –13 carries, 60 yards, TD
- UIW – Kevin Brown – 21 carries, 116 yards

Top receivers

- NSU – Quan Shorts – 11 receptions, 99 yards, TD
- UIW – CJ Hardy – 4 receptions, 84 yards

=== At McNeese State ===
Statistics	Northwestern State	McNeese State
First downs	18	14
Total yards	314	308
Rushing yards	20	117
Passing yards	294	191
Turnovers	3	2
Time of possession	27:19	32:41

Northwestern State at McNeese State – Game summary

Quarter	1	2	3	4	Total
Demons	10	7	3	0	20
Cowboys	6	3	8	13	30

at Cowboy Stadium, Lake Charles, LA

- Date: November 2
- Game time: 4:00 p.m. CST
- Game weather: 62 °F (17 °C); fair and cool
- Game attendance: 9,295
- Referee: Mike Defee
- TV: CST

Game information

First quarter

- (11:22) NSU TD – Jared West 9-yard rush, Daniel Justino kick
  Northwestern State 7–0; Drive: 8 plays, 53 yards, 2:41
- (11:09) MCNS TD – D'Andre Hicks 96-yard kickoff returned, Bailey Raborn PAT blocked
  Northwestern State 7–6; Drive: 0 plays, 0 yards, 0:00
- (06:59) NSU FG – Daniel Justino 37-yard field goal
  Northwestern State 10–6; Drive: 10 plays, 51 yards, 4:05

Second quarter

- (14:14) MCNS FG – Bailey Raborn 23-yard field goal
  Northwestern State 10–9; Drive: 7 plays, 24 yards, 2:46
- (10:27) NSU TD – Quan Shorts 22-yard pass from Shelton Eppler, Daniel Justino kick
  Northwestern State 17–9; Drive: 2 plays, 22 yards, 0:12

Third quarter

- (10:34) NSU FG – Daniel Justino 21-yard field goal
  Northwestern State 20–9; Drive: 11 plays, 71 yards, 4:26
- (02:45) MCNS TD – Trevor Begue 27-yard pass from Cody Orgeron, Cody Orgeron two-point conversion pass to J'Uan Gross
  Northwestern State 20–17; Drive: 4 plays, 54 yards, 1:21

Fourth quarter

- (14:57) MCNS TD – Trevor Begue 3-yard pass from Cody Orgeron, Bailey Raborn kick
  McNeese State 24–20; Drive: 6 plays, 17 yards, 2:41
- (08:14) MCNS FG – Bailey Raborn 20-yard field goal
  McNeese State 27–20; Drive: 9 plays, 56 yards, 4:52
- (01:06) MCNS FG – Bailey Raborn 29-yard field goal
  McNeese State 30–20; Drive: 4 plays, 5 yards, 0:58

Top passers

- NSU – Shelton Eppler – 28/53, 294 yards, TD, 2 INT
- MCNS – Cody Orgeron – 16/18, 191 yards, 2 TD

Top rushers

- NSU – Jared West – 8 carries, 31 yards, TD
- MCNS – Justin Pratt – 29 carries, 87 yards

Top receivers

- NSU – Akile Davis – 4 receptions, 73 yards
- MCNS – Cyron Sutton – 7 receptions, 71 yards

=== Lamar ===
Statistics	Lamar	Northwestern State
First downs	12	22
Total yards	200	466
Rushing yards	93	177
Passing yards	107	289
Turnovers	2	2
Time of possession	26:44	33:16

Lamar at Northwestern State – Game summary

Quarter	1	2	3	4	Total
Cardinals	3	7	3	0	13
Demons	7	7	7	13	34

at Harry Turpin Stadium, Natchitoches, LA

- Date: November 9
- Game time: 6:30 p.m. CST
- Game weather: 52 °F (11 °C); clear and calm
- Game attendance: 5,122
- Referee: Cooper Castlebe
- TV: CST

Game information

First quarter

- (07:22) LAMR FG – Bailey Giffen 37-yard field goal
  Lamar 3–0; Drive: 10 plays, 45 yards, 5:28
- (04:35) NSU TD – Miles Ward 39-yard pass from Shelton Eppler, Daniel Justino kick
  Northwestern State 7–3; Drive: 6 plays, 75 yards, 2:47

Second quarter

- (08:25) NSU TD – Kendrick Price 4-yard pass from Shelton Eppler, Daniel Justino kick
  Northwestern State 14–3; Drive: 10 plays, 65 yards, 3:20
- (03:34) LAMR TD – Michael Lawson 15-yard interception returned, Bailey Giffen kick
  Northwestern State 14–10; Drive: 2 plays, 3 yards, 0:35

Third quarter

- (08:29) LAMR FG – Bailey Giffen 25-yard field goal
  Northwestern State 14–13; Drive: 7 plays, 52 yards, 3:13
- (01:09) NSU TD – Tanner Ash 2-yard pass from Shelton Eppler, Daniel Justino kick
  Northwestern State 21–13; Drive: 3 plays, 1 yards, 1:14

Fourth quarter

- (12:00) NSU TD – Kendrick Price 12-yard pass from Shelton Eppler, Daniel Justino kick
  Northwestern State 28–13; Drive: 8 plays, 74 yards, 3:30
- (06:10) NSU TD – Stadford Anderson 40-yard rush, Daniel Justino PAT failed
  Northwestern State 34–13; Drive: 6 plays, 73 yards, 3:52

Top passers

- LAMR – Marcellus Johnson – 5/20, 107 yards, INT
- NSU – Shelton Eppler – 24/35, 289 yards, 4 TD, 2 INT

Top rushers

- LAMR – Marcellus Johnson – 15 carries, 57 yards
- NSU – Stadford Anderson – 13 carries, 84 yards, TD

Top receivers

- LAMR – Kirkland Banks – 1 reception, 43 yards
- NSU – Kendrick Price – 6 receptions, 69 yards, 2 TD

=== At Sam Houston State ===
Statistics	Northwestern State	Sam Houston State
First downs	21	19
Total yards	380	359
Rushing yards	74	135
Passing yards	306	224
Turnovers	1	4
Time of possession	34:17	25:43

Northwestern State at Sam Houston State – Game summary

Quarter	1	2	3	4	Total
Demons	7	17	7	0	31
Bearkats	21	0	7	0	28

at Bowers Stadium, Huntsville, TX

- Date: November 16
- Game time: 12:00 p.m. CST
- Game weather: 58 °F (14 °C); sunny and clear
- Game attendance: 4,280
- Referee: Dan Lewis
- TV: ESPN+

Game information

First quarter

- (12:06) SHSU TD – Donovan Williams 12-yard rush, Hunter Pinegar kick
  Sam Houston State 7–0; Drive: 10 plays, 65 yards, 2:54
- (09:48) NSU TD – Kendrick Price 67-yard pass from Shelton Eppler, Daniel Justino kick
  Tied 7–7; Drive: 6 plays, 89 yards, 2:14
- (06:38) SHSU TD – Donovan Williams 1-yard rush, Hunter Pinegar kick
  Sam Houston State 14–7; Drive: 8 plays, 57 yards, 3:03
- (06:02) SHSU TD – Dwayne Williams 23-yard interception returned, Hunter Pinegar kick
  Sam Houston State 21–7; Drive: 2 plays, 10 yards, 0:36

Second quarter

- (07:27) NSU TD – Quan Shorts 1-yard pass from Shelton Eppler, Daniel Justino kick
  Sam Houston State 21–14; Drive: 14 plays, 78 yards, 5:52
- (02:52) NSU FG – Daniel Justino 43-yard field goal
  Sam Houston State 21–17; Drive: 7 plays, 49 yards, 2:59
- (00:19) NSU TD – Shemar Bartholomew 96-yard interception returned, Daniel Justino kick
  Northwestern State 24–21; Drive: 9 plays, 73 yards, 2:28

Third quarter

- (09:57) SHSU TD – Donovan Williams 10-yard rush, Hunter Pinegar kick
  Sam Houston State 28–24; Drive: 2 plays, 59 yards, 0:38
- (08:03) NSU TD – Shelton Eppler 5-yard rush, Daniel Justino kick
  Northwestern State 31–28; Drive: 6 plays, 75 yards, 1:54

Top passers

- NSU – Shelton Eppler – 26/42 306 yards, 2 TD, INT
- SHSU – Ty Brock – 10/20, 146 yards, 3 INT

Top rushers

- NSU – Stadford Anderson – 15 carries, 62 yards
- SHSU – Donovan Williams – 23 carries, 152 yards, 3 TD

Top receivers

- NSU – Kendrick Price – 4 receptions, 114 yards, TD
- SHSU – Chandler Harvin – 4 receptions, 108 yards

=== Stephen F. Austin ===
Statistics	Stephen F. Austin	Northwestern State
First downs	21	20
Total yards	418	389
Rushing yards	232	56
Passing yards	186	333
Turnovers	3	3
Time of possession	36:37	23:23

Stephen F. Austin at Northwestern State – Game summary

Quarter	1	2	3	4	Total
Lumberjacks	13	14	5	0	32
Demons	0	7	7	6	20

at Harry Turpin Stadium, Natchitoches, LA

- Date: November 21
- Game time: 6:00 p.m. CST
- Game weather: 69 °F (21 °C); cloudy and calm
- Game attendance: 5,822
- Referee: Vidal Jones

Game information

First quarter

- (08:07) SFA FG – Storm Ruiz 54-yard field goal
  Stephen F. Austin 3–0; Drive: 6 plays, 15 yards, 2:17
- (05:38) SFA TD – Thomas Hutchings 7-yard rush, Storm Ruiz kick
  Stephen F. Austin 10–0; Drive: 3 plays, 13 yards, 1:10
- (00:28) SFA FG – Storm Ruiz 41-yard field goal
  Stephen F. Austin 13–0; Drive: 9 plays, 47 yards, 2:57

Second quarter

- (10:47) SFA TD – Josh McGowen 20-yard rush, Storm Ruiz kick
  Stephen F. Austin 20–0; Drive: 7 plays, 46 yards, 3:19
- (10:39) SFA TD – Xavier Gipson 55-yard pass from Trae Self, Storm Ruiz kick
  Stephen F. Austin 27–0; Drive: 1 play, 55 yards, 0:08
- (02:24) NSU TD – Kendrick Price 15-yard pass from Shelton Eppler, Daniel Justino kick
  Stephen F. Austin 27–7; Drive: 4 plays, 33 yards, 1:06

Third quarter

- (11:09) SFA SF – Team Safety
  Stephen F. Austin 29–7; Drive: 1 play, -2 yards, 0:09
- (08:48) SFA FG – Storm Ruiz 44-yard field goal
  Stephen F. Austin 32–7; Drive: 6 plays, 23 yards, 2:21
- (00:27) NSU TD – Quan Shorts 15-yard pass from Shelton Eppler, Daniel Justino kick
  Stephen F. Austin 32–14; Drive: 6 plays, 71 yards, 3:15

Fourth quarter

- (09:22) NSU TD – Jared West 10-yard rush, two-point pass conversion attempt failed
  Stephen F. Austin 32–20; Drive: 5 plays, 90 yards, 1:38

Top passers

- SFA – Trae Self – 15/29, 177 yards, TD, 2 INT
- NSU – Shelton Eppler – 27/50, 333 yards, 2 TD, INT

Top rushers

- SFA – Josh McGowen – 22 carries, 158 yards, TD
- NSU – Stadford Anderson – 6 carries, 35 yards

Top receivers

- SFA – Xavier Gipson – 7 receptions, 98 yards, TD
- NSU – Quan Shorts – 9 receptions, 132 yards, TD

== Roster ==
2019 Northwestern State Demons football team roster
Players
Coaches
Offense

Pos.	#	Name	Class
WR	1	Quan Shorts	Sr
QB	2	Kaleb Fletcher	So
RB	3	Stadford Anderson	Jr
WR	4	Benaiah Franklin	Jr
QB	5	Shelton Eppler	Sr
WR	6	Robbie Wiliams III	Fr
QB	7	Bryce Waters	So
WR	8	Levar Gumms	So
WR	9	Akile Davis	Sr
WR	10	Myles Ward	So
WR	11	Tanner Ash	So
QB	13	Zachary Clement	Fr
WR	14	Coby McGee	So
WR	15	Jalen Willis	Fr
TE	17	David Fitzwater	Jr
WR	18	Kendrick Price	Jr
WR	19	Curtis Williams	Fr
RB	20	Trevor Morgan	So
RB	21	Jared West	Sr
RB	25	JaQuan Jackson	Fr
RB	27	Erik Hart	Fr
WR	35	T. K. Hamilton	Fr
RB	42	Matthew Nelson	Fr
OL	56	Kenny Sheldon	So
OL	57	Brody Griffin	Jr
OL	59	Jalen Haydel	Jr
OL	60	Tyler Rapp	Sr
OL	61	Spencer Cody	Fr
OL	62	Jake Gore	So
OL	63	Alyzcha Ulufale-Hentz	Fr
OL	64	Reggie Young	Fr
OL	67	Jordan Cooper	Fr
OL	69	Jakob Sell	So
OL	70	Jonathan Hubbard	Sr
OL	72	Khalil Corbett-Canada	So
OL	74	Chris Zirkle	Sr
OL	75	Dustin Burns	Sr
OL	76	Christian Mobley	Fr
OL	77	Parker Fink	So
OL	78	Cody Coleman	So
OL	79	Clay Cotten	Fr
TE	82	Aaron Howell	Fr
WR	83	Jacob Sylvia	Fr
WR	84	Gavin Landry	Jr
WR	85	Gabriel Ernest	Fr
WR	86	Patrick Heard	Fr
TE	88	Tyler O'Donoghue	Sr
WR	89	McKane Kinchen	So

Defense

Pos.	#	Name	Class
CB	1	Tobias Williams	Fr
CB	2	D'Ronne Littleton	Sr
CB	3	Shemar Bartholomew	So
S	4	Cedric Anderson	Fr
ILB	5	Jalen Angelle	Fr
CB	6	Kunta Hester	Fr
S	7	Kevin Ratliff	Sr
S	8	Ryan Reed	Sr
LB	10	Ja'Quay Pough	Jr
OLB	11	Jomard Valsin Jr.	So
S	14	Isaiah Armstrong	Sr
CB	15	William Hooper	So
CB	16	Fredrick Lee Jr.	Fr
S	18	Ronald Malbrough	Sr
OLB	19	Tevyn Johnson	Jr
CB	20	Malik Sonnier	Jr
ILB	21	Jared Pedraza	Fr
ILB	22	Adrion Robertson	Jr
S	23	Nicholas Forde	Sr
S	24	Ian Edwards	Sr
S	25	Hayden Bourgeois	Jr
CB	26	Keldrick Ward	So
CB	28	Dylan Wilson	Sr
CB	29	Trey Williams	So
ILB	30	Bishop Breaux	Fr
CB	31	Jalen Garrison	Fr
OLB	32	Landon King	So
ILB	33	Isaiah Longino	Jr
OLB	35	Kyle Moore	Jr
ILB	36	Corban James	Jr
OLB	38	Quindarrius Whitley	Sr
OLB	39	Chandler Moncrief	Fr
S	40	TK Evans	Fr
ILB	43	Blake Stephenson	Sr
CB	45	Tyson Ford	Fr
CB	46	Ray Johnson	Fr
OLB	47	Rashuad Powell	So
DE	48	Johnathan Daigle	Fr
S	49	Keenan Leachman	Fr
ILB	50	Ricky Chatman	Jr
DT	51	Nathalohn Nanai	So
DE	52	Desmond Prejean	Sr
ILB	53	Brice Borgeson	Sr
OLB	54	Matthew Pajinag	Fr
DT	55	O'Shea Jackson	Sr
OLB	57	Jackson Matthews	So
DT	58	Myles Mitchell	So
NT	70	Khalil Sumlin	Jr
DL	71	Devin Gabriel	Fr
DE	90	Darius Whitfield	Jr
DE	91	Jarviar Wade	Fr
DE	93	Ty Cormier	Fr
DT	94	Ja'Quez Jackson	Fr
NT	95	Joey McNeely	Fr
DT	96	Jabralen Yarber	Fr
DE	97	John-Alex Perkins	So
DT	98	Tyrus Butler	Jr
NT	99	Damian Thompson	Jr

Special teams

Pos.	#	Name	Class
P	9	Parker Pastorello	Sr
K	37	Daniel Justino	Jr
K, P	43	Scotty Roblow	Fr
LS	55	Evan Gibson	Fr
K	94	Ryan Gremillion	Fr

Head coach

- Brad Laird (Northwestern State)

Coordinators/assistant coaches

- Brad Smiley (Baylor)
  Offensive coordinator, tight ends
- Mike Lucas (William & Mary)
  Defensive coordinator, inside linebackers
- De'Von Lockett (Northwestern State)
  Defensive backs
- Gerald Howse (Georgia)
  Running backs
- Ledell Love (Northwestern State)
  Defensive line
- Jake Olsen (Valley City State)
  Safeties, recruiting coordinator
- J Pond (Texas A&M)
  Offensive line
- Anthony Scelfo (Tulane)
  Quarterbacks
- Alvin Slaughter (Clarion)
  Wide receivers

Legend

- (C) Team captain
- (S) Suspended
- (I) Ineligible
- Injured
- Redshirt

Roster
Last update: May 5, 2020
