= Sterlin Gilbert =

American football player and coach (born 1978)

Biographical details
- Born: August 11, 1978 (age 48); San Angelo, Texas, U.S.

Playing career
- 1999–2002: Angelo State
- Position: Quarterback

Coaching career (HC unless noted)
- 2003: Springtown HS (TX) (RB)
- 2004: Springtown HS (TX) (QB)
- 2005: Houston (GA)
- 2006–2007: Cooper HS (TX) (OC/QB)
- 2008–2010: Lake View HS (TX)
- 2011: Temple HS (TX) (OC/QB)
- 2012–2013: Eastern Illinois (OC/QB)
- 2014: Bowling Green (OC/QB)
- 2015: Tulsa (co-OC/QB)
- 2016: Texas (OC/QB)
- 2017–2018: South Florida (OC/QB)
- 2019: McNeese State
- 2020–2021: Syracuse (OC/QB)
- 2023: Ole Miss (OA)
- 2024: California (PGC/QB)

Head coaching record
- Overall: 7–5 (college); 9–23 (high school)

Accomplishments and honors

Awards
- 2× All-Lone Star Conference

Sterlin Gilbert (born August 11, 1978) is an American football coach and former player who most recently served as the passing game coordinator and quarterbacks coach for the California Golden Bears in 2024. Gilbert played college football at Angelo State University, where was a two-time All-Lone Star Conference selection at quarterback. He served as the offensive coordinator at Eastern Illinois University from 2012 to 2013, Bowling Green State University in 2014, the University of Tulsa in 2015, the University of Texas at Austin in 2016, and the University of South Florida from 2017 to 2018.

== Coaching career ==
=== Texas ===
In 2015, Gilbert was hired by Charlie Strong at the University of Texas at Austin as offensive coordinator and quarterbacks coach until the end of the 2016 season.

=== University of South Florida ===
After Charlie Strong's termination from the University of Texas, Gilbert followed Strong to USF. His overall offensive style received criticism, as he was over reliant on halfback dive plays and did not attempt to open up the field, causing breakdowns against better defenses. In 2018, Gilbert's offense experienced early success with transfer QB Blake Barnett, before his scheme and injuries along the OL resulted in frequent sacks and eventual injury to Barnett, resulting in widespread calls for Gilbert's termination.

=== McNeese State ===
On December 5, 2018, Sterlin Gilbert was named the head football coach at McNeese State University, consequently avoiding potential termination by USF. In 2019, Gilbert led McNeese State to a 7–5 record.

=== Syracuse ===
In January 2020, Gilbert was hired by Dino Babers at Syracuse University as offensive coordinator and quarterbacks coach. He was not retained on staff after the 2021 season.

=== California ===
In December 2023, Gilbert joined the California Golden Bears as their passing game coordinator and quarterbacks coach for the 2024 season, but was not retained after that season.

== Head coaching record ==
=== College ===
Year	Team	Overall	Conference	Standing	Bowl/playoffs
McNeese State Cowboys (Southland Conference) (2019)
2019	McNeese State	7–5	5–4	5th	
McNeese State:		7–5	5–4		
Total:		7–5			
