= 2019 Nicholls Colonels football team =

American college football season

2019 Nicholls Colonels football

Southland co-champion

NCAA Division I Second Round, L 13–37 at North Dakota State
- Conference: Southland Conference

Ranking
- STATS: No. 14
- FCS Coaches: No. 14
- Record: 9–5 (7–2 Southland)
- Head coach: Tim Rebowe (5th season)
- Offensive coordinator: Rob Christophel (5th season)
- Offensive scheme: Spread
- Defensive coordinator: Tommy Rybacki (5th season)
- Base defense: Multiple 4–3
- Home stadium: John L. Guidry Stadium

2019 Southland Conference football standings
	Conf.			Overall
Team	W		L	W		L
No. 14 Nicholls +^	7	–	2	8	–	4
No. 11 Central Arkansas +^	7	–	2	9	–	3
No. 19 Southeastern Louisiana ^	6	–	3	8	–	5
Sam Houston State	6	–	3	7	–	5
McNeese State	5	–	4	7	–	5
Incarnate Word	4	–	5	5	–	7
Abilene Christian	4	–	5	5	–	7
Northwestern State	3	–	6	3	–	9
Stephen F. Austin	3	–	6	3	–	9
Houston Baptist	2	–	6	5	–	7
Lamar	2	–	7	4	–	8
+ – Conference co-champions; ^ – FCS playoff participant; Rankings from STATS poll

The 2019 Nicholls State Colonels football team represented Nicholls State University as a member of the Southland Conference during the 2019 NCAA Division I FCS football season. Led by fifth-year head coach Tim Rebowe, the Colonels compiled an overall record of 9–5 with a mark of 7–2 in conference play, sharing the Southland title with Central Arkansas. Nicholls State received the Southland's automatic bid to the NCAA Division I Football Championship, beating North Dakota in the first round before losing to the eventual national champion, North Dakota State, in the second round. The team played home games at John L. Guidry Stadium in Thibodaux, Louisiana.

== Preseason ==
=== Preseason poll ===
The Southland Conference released their preseason poll on July 18, 2019. The Colonels were picked to finish in first place.

=== Preseason All–Southland Teams ===
The Colonels placed eleven players on the preseason all–Southland teams.

Offense

1st team

Chase Fourcade – QB

Dai'Jean Dixon – WR

P.J. Burkhalter – OL

Winston Jones – P

2nd team

Dontrell Taylor – RB

Jair Joseph – OL

Defense

1st team

Sully Laiche – DL

Evan Veron – LB

Allen Pittman – LB

Darren Evans – DB

2nd team

Khristian Mims – DB

== Roster ==
2019 Nicholls Colonels football team roster
Players
Coaches
Offense

Pos.	#	Name	Class
RB	1	Dontrell Taylor	Sr
RB	2	Kendall Bussey	Sr
WR	5	Dai'Jean Dixon	Jr
QB	9	Chase Fourcade	Sr
WR	10	Charles Brooks	Sr
QB	11	Caleb Lee	Fr
QB	12	Andrew Robison	Fr
WR	13	Mason Roberts	Sr
WR	14	Arron McKenney	Jr
QB	15	Kohen Granier	So
TE	18	Jordan Talley	Sr
QB	19	Cameron Dartez	Fr
RB	20	Ronnie Jackson	Fr
WR	21	Dion Ray	Sr
RB	22	Jeremy Rounds	Jr
WR	23	Brooks Thomas	Fr
WR	24	Justin Rivet	Fr
WR	26	Tahj Smith	Jr
RB	27	Devin Briscoe	So
RB	28	Julien Gums	So
WR	33	Stefano Guarisco	Sr
RB	35	Donnell Adair	Jr
RB	37	John Carrington III	Fr
WR	38	Lance Williams	Fr
TE	40	Garret LeBlanc	Sr
TE	44	Codi Willis	Fr
OL	57	Jeremiah James	Fr
OL	60	David Mosley	Jr
OL	61	Alex Beier	Fr
OL	62	Zach Trahan	So
OL	64	P. J. Burkhalter	Jr
OL	65	Matthew Williams	Fr
OL	66	Tyrin Arceneaux	Jr
OL	67	Owen Melville	Fr
OL	68	Leonard Hickman	Fr
OL	69	Zakk McKeehan	Fr
OL	71	Cameron Carrier	Jr
OL	72	Ja'Cobey Lee	Fr
OL	73	Jair Joseph	Jr
OL	74	Bradston Burnside	Sr
OL	77	Mikhail Hill	So
TE	80	Morell Bartholomew	Sr
WR	81	David Robinson Jr.	Fr
TE	82	Levon Williams	Fr
WR	83	Darrion Cook	Sr
WR	84	Brooks Rayburn	Fr
WR	85	Dontaze Costly	So
WR	87	Quincy Cage Jr.	Fr
TE	88	Bry'Kiethon Mouton	Sr
TE	89	Hoxie Brown	Fr
QB		Lindsey Scott Jr.	Jr

Defense

Pos.	#	Name	Class
DL	3	Tahj Brown	Fr
LB	4	Giovanni LaFrance	Jr
DB	6	Anfernee Poindexter	Jr
DB	7	Kevin Moore III	Jr
DB	8	Alonzo Craighton	Sr
DB	10	Anthony Ruffin	Fr
LB	11	Aquindas Steib	Jr
DB	13	Dede Gant	Fr
DB	14	Bryce Authement	Fr
DB	16	Jordan Jackson	Fr
DB	17	Lloyd Nash	Fr
LB	20	Mikey Corcoran	Sr
DB	21	Jamal Walter	So
LB	23	Korey Louis	Jr
DB	24	Darren Evans	Jr
LB	25	Laryon James	Sr
DB	27	Christopher Boutte	Fr
DB	29	Chase Brown	So
DB	30	Kairon Brooks	Jr
DB	31	William Black	Fr
DB	31	K. J. Franklin	Fr
DB	32	Shawn Hall	Fr
DB	34	Khristian Mims	Sr
DB	35	Keith Henderson	Fr
DB	38	Kevin Johnson	Jr
DB	40	Jarvais Robinson	So
DB	41	Zane McCrary	Fr
DB	42	Jarius Monroe	Fr
DL	43	Patrick Riley	Sr
DB	45	Brennan Patterson	Fr
DB	46	Chris Duplantis	Jr
LB	47	Allen Pittman	Sr
LB	48	Evan Veron	Sr
DL	50	Omar Pew	Fr
LB	51	Michael Mosley	Sr
LB	52	Dellary Oubre	Fr
LB	54	Aaron Buckwalter	Fr
DL	55	Sully Laiche	Sr
LB	56	Noah Mariana	Fr
LB	56	Jacob Parker	Fr
LB	57	Myles Guidry	Fr
DL	58	Chris Welch	Fr
LB	59	Cullen Butler	Fr
DL	70	Zach Gremillion	Fr
DL	89	Devin Edinburgh	Jr
DL	90	Chris Thomas	Fr
DL	91	Elijah Reames	Fr
DL	92	Danquan Edwards	So
DL	93	Caleb Jackson	Fr
DL	94	Brandon Fontenot	Sr
DL	96	Glen Thurmond	So
DL	97	Aaron Kent	Jr
DL	98	Perry Ganci	Fr

Special teams

Pos.	#	Name	Class
P	22	Matthew Alfonso	Fr
K	36	Gunnar Jones	Jr
K	39	Matthew Martin	So
K	45	Alec Bland	Fr
K	46	Gavin Lasseigne	Fr
LS	53	Dominic Brocato	So
LS	54	Andrea Dragna	Fr
LS	61	Jalen Himel	Fr
P	99	Winston Jones	Sr

Head coach

- Tim Rebowe (LSU)

Coordinators/assistant coaches

- Rob Christophel (Austin Peay)
  Offensive coordinator
- Tommy Rybacki (Jacksonville State)
  Defensive coordinator
- Russ Gisclair (Nicholls State)
  Tight ends
- Sammy Joseph (LSU)
  Running backs
- Sean Murphy (Millsaps)
  Wide receivers
- Marcel Andry (Nicholls State)
  Defensive line
- Chris Thompson (Nicholls State)
  Cornerbacks
- Brian Wallace (Louisiana College)
  Safeties
- Lee Roussel (Southeastern Louisiana)
  Offensive line

Legend

- (C) Team captain
- (S) Suspended
- (I) Ineligible
- Injured
- Redshirt

Roster
Last update: May 7, 2020

== Schedule ==
Date	Time	Opponent	Rank	Site	TV	Result	Attendance
August 31	6:00 p.m.	at Kansas State*	No. 12	Bill Snyder Family Stadium; Manhattan, KS	ESPN+	L 14–49	51,189
September 14	6:00 p.m.	at Prairie View A&M*	No. 12	Panther Stadium; Prairie View, TX	PVAMU SN	W 42–35	8,756
September 21	6:00 p.m.	at Stephen F. Austin	No. 13	Homer Bryce Stadium; Nacogdoches, TX	ESPN+	W 48–30	14,575
September 28	6:00 p.m.	at Texas State*	No. 12	Bobcat Stadium; San Marcos (Battle for the Paddle)	ESPN+	L 3–24	19,159
October 5	3:00 p.m.	No. 11 Central Arkansas	No. 16	John L. Guidry Stadium; Thibodaux, LA	YouTube	W 34–14	7,021
October 12	3:00 p.m.	Northwestern State	No. 12	John L. Guidry Stadium; Thibodaux, LA (NSU Challenge)	Cox/ESPN+	W 45–35	8,103
October 19	2:00 p.m.	at Sam Houston State	No. 9	Bowers Stadium; Huntsville, TX	ESPN+	L 0–17	3,953
October 26	3:00 p.m.	Abilene Christian	No. 15	John L. Guidry Stadium; Thibodaux, LA	Cox/ESPN+	L 31–37^{OT}	5,012
November 2	4:00 p.m.	at Incarnate Word	No. 25	Gayle and Tom Benson Stadium; San Antonio, TX	ESPN3	W 27–23	3,928
November 9	3:00 p.m.	Houston Baptist	No. 25	John L. Guidry Stadium; Thibodaux, LA	Cox/ESPN+	W 48–27	4,558
November 16	3:00 p.m.	McNeese State	No. 24	John L. Guidry Stadium; Thibodaux, LA	Cox/ESPN+	W 34–20	8,958
November 21	6:00 p.m.	at No. 21 Southeastern Louisiana	No. 23	Strawberry Stadium; Hammond, LA (River Bell Classic)	Cox/ESPN+	W 28–27	10,071
November 30	3:00 p.m.	No. 24 North Dakota*	No. 19	John L. Guidry Stadium; Thibodaux, LA (NCAA Division I First Round)	ESPN3	W 24–6	7,569
December 7	2:00 p.m.	at No. 1 North Dakota State*	No. 19	Fargodome; Fargo, ND (NCAA Division I Second Round)	ESPN3	L 13–37	15,690
*Non-conference game; Rankings from STATS Poll released prior to the game; All times are in Central time

== Game summaries ==
=== At Kansas State ===
Nicholls at Kansas State – Game summary

Quarter	1	2	3	4	Total
No. 12 (FCS) Colonels	0	0	7	7	14
Wildcats	14	14	0	21	49

at Bill Snyder Family Football Stadium, Manhattan, KS

- Date: August 31
- Game time: 6:00 p.m. CDT
- Game weather: 73 °F (23 °C); partly cloudy
- Game attendance: 51,189
- Referee: Tuta Salaam
- TV: ESPN+

Game information

First quarter

- (08:45) KSU TD – Harry Trotter 9-yard rush, Black Lynch kick
  Kansas State 7–0; Drive: 12 plays, 72 yards, 6:15
- (05:45) KSU TD – Skyler Thompson 17-yard rush, Blake Lynch kick
  Kansas State 14–0; Drive: 5 plays, 28 yards, 2:21

Second quarter

- (13:35) KSU TD – Josh Brown 14-yard rush, Blake Lynch kick
  Kansas State 21–0; Drive: 10 plays, 71 yards, 4:47
- (06:21) KSU TD – James Gilbert 24-yard rush, Blake Lynch kick
  Kansas State 28–0; Drive: 10 plays, 73 yards, 5:20

Third quarter

- (12:46) NICH TD – Kendall Bussey 26-yard rush, Gunner Jones kick
  Kansas State 28–7; Drive: 5 plays, 75 yards, 2:14

Fourth quarter

- (14:52) KSU TD – Dalton Schoen 38-yard pass from Skylar Thompson, Blake Lynch kick
  Kansas State 35–7; Drive: 10 plays, 97 yards, 5:09
- (14:36) KSU TD – Jonathan Alexander 25-yard fumble returned, Blake Lynch kick
  Kansas State 42–7; Drive: 2 plays, 0 yards, 0:16
- (06:41) KSU TD – Tyler Burns 1-yard rush, Blake Lynch kick
  Kansas State 49–7; Drive: 10 plays, 59 yards, 6:05
- (03:01) NICH TD – Julien Gums 3-yard rush, Gunner Jones kick
  Kansas State 49–14; Drive: 7 plays, 75 yards, 3:40

Top passers

- KSU - Skylar Thompson - 16/22, 212 yards, TD
- NICH - Chase Fourcade - 10/18, 126 yards, INT

Top rushers

- KSU - James Gilbert - 18 carries, 115 yards, TD
- NICH - Julien Gums - 12 carries, 75 yards, TD

Top receivers

- KSU - Dalton Schoen - 3 receptions, 65 yards, TD
- NICH - Dai'Jean Dixon - 5 receptions, 92 yards

Statistics	Nicholls	Kansas State
First downs	11	33
Total yards	276	575
Rushing yards	150	361
Passing yards	126	212
Turnovers	2	0
Time of possession	18:51	41:09

Kansas State scored touchdowns on their first four possessions and were successful 10 of 12 attempts on third down in 80 offensive plays. Kansas State also managed the clock, being on offense for more than 41 minutes. For Nicholls, this was largely different compared to last year's opener when they defeated the Kansas Jayhawks. The Colonel's Kendall Bussey and Julien Gums both produced second-half touchdown runs to put their team on the board, but it wasn't nearly enough. Despite the loss, Nicholls managed to move up in the FCS coaches poll, going from #11 to #10. They also jumped two spots to #10 in the FCS STATS Poll.

=== At Prairie View A&M ===
Nicholls at Prairie View A&M – Game summary

Quarter	1	2	3	4	Total
No. 12 Colonels	6	0	29	7	42
Panthers	0	21	0	14	35

at Panther Stadium at Blackshear Field, Prairie View, TX

- Date: September 14
- Game time: 6:00 p.m. CDT
- Game weather: 99 °F (37 °C); clear & sunny
- Game attendance: 8,756
- Referee: Ver Breakfield

Game information

First quarter

- (08:29) NICH TD – Dion Ray 15-yard rush, Gavin Lasseigne PAT failed
  Nicholls 6–0; Drive: 10 plays, 90 yards, 4:56

Second quarter

- (11:48) PVAMU TD – Jalen Morton 23-yard rush, Amaury Martinez kick
  Prairie View A&M 7–6; Drive: 6 plays, 61 yards, 2:19
- (03:52) PVAMU TD – Tony Mullins 16-yard pass from Jalen Morton, Amaury Martinez kick
  Prairie View A&M 14–6; Drive: 6 plays, 80 yards, 2:20
- (00:52) PVAMU TD – Kalen Riles 39-yard pass from Jalen Morton, Amaury Martinez kick
  Prairie View A&M 21–6; Drive: 6 plays, 74 yards, 2:33

Third quarter

- (10:28) NICH TD – Chase Fourcade 5-yard rush, Gavin Lasseigne kick
  Prairie View A&M 21–13; Drive: 11 plays, 93 yards, 4:21
- (05:33) NICH TD – Dai'Jean Dixon 14-yard pass from Chase Fourcade, Kendall Bussey two-point conversion rush
  Tied 21–21; Drive: 6 plays, 49 yards, 2:32
- (03:46) NICH TD – Chase Fourcade 3-yard rush, Gavin Lasseigne kick
  Nicholls 28–21; Drive: 3 plays, 3 yards, 1:26
- (03:22) NICH TD – Dai'Jean 36-yard pass from Chase Fourcade, Gavin Lasseigne kick
  Nicholls 35–21; Drive: 1 play, 36 yards, 0:10

Fourth quarter

- (13:11) PVAMU TD – Jalen Morton 1-yard rush, Amaury Martinez kick
  Nicholls 35–28; Drive: 13 plays, 73 yards, 5:01
- (06:41) NICH TD – Julien Gums 2-yard rush, Gavin Lasseigne kick
  Nicholls 42–28; Drive: 10 plays, 66 yards, 6:29
- (05:50) PVAMU TD – Tony Mullins 36-yard pass from Jalen Morton, Amaury Martinez kick
  Nicholls 42–35; Drive: 3 plays, 64 yards, 0:45

Top passers

- NICH - Chase Fourcade - 17/22, 224 yards, 2 TD
- PVAMU - Jalen Morton - 23/36, 327 yards, 3 TD, 2 INT

Top rushers

- NICH - Kendall Bussey - 18 carries, 84 yards
- PVAMU - Jalen Morton - 14 carries, 80 yards, 2 TD

Top receivers

- NICH - Dai'Jean Dixon - 7 receptions, 126 yards, 2 TD
- PVAMU - Tony Mullins - 5 receptions, 90 yards, 2 TD

Statistics	Nicholls	Prairie View A&M
First downs	30	28
Total yards	463	463
Rushing yards	239	136
Passing yards	224	327
Turnovers	0	4
Time of possession	39:14	20:46

=== At Stephen F. Austin ===
Nicholls at Stephen F. Austin – Game summary

Quarter	1	2	3	4	Total
No. 13 Colonels	7	21	7	13	48
Lumberjacks	7	16	0	7	30

at Homer Bryce Stadium, Nacogdoches, TX

- Date: September 21
- Game time: 6:00 p.m. CDT
- Game weather: 86 °F (30 °C); clear skies
- Game attendance: 10,304
- Referee: Vidal Jones

Game information

First quarter

- (12:07) SFA TD – Trae Self 21-yard rush, Storm Ruiz kick
  Stephen F. Austin 7–0; Drive: 7 plays, 84 yards, 2:53
- (08:04) NICH TD – Julien Gums 21-yard rush, Gunner Jones kick
  Tied 7–7; Drive: 7 plays, 77 yards, 3:57

Second quarter

- (14:12) NICH TD – Stefano Guarisco 14-yard pass from Chase Fourcade, Gunner Jones kick
  Nicholls 14–7; Drive: 12 plays, 98 yards, 6:43
- (10:55) SFA FG – Storm Ruiz 21-yard field goal
  Nicholls 14–10; Drive: 9 plays, 71 yards, 3:12
- (07:13) SFA FG – Storm Ruiz 22-yard field goal
  Nicholls 14–13; Drive: 6 plays, 34 yards, 2:48
- (05:14) NICH TD – Jeremy Rounds 4-yard rush, Gunner Jones kick
  Nicholls 21–13; Drive: 7 plays, 75 yards, 1:59
- (04:39) SFA TD – Xavier Gipson 47-yard pass from Trae Self, Storm Ruiz kick
  Nicholls 21–20; Drive: 2 plays, 58 yards, 0:24
- (01:20) NICH TD – Julien Gums 9-yard rush, Gunner Jones kick
  Nicholls 28–20; Drive: 9 plays, 75 yards, 3:19
- (00:17) SFA FG – Storm Ruiz 35-yard field goal
  Nicholls 28–23; Drive: 7 plays, 23 yards, 0:55

Third quarter

- (11:35) NICH TD – Chase Fourcade 19-yard rush, Gunner Jones kick
  Nicholls 35–23; Drive: 7 plays, 75 yards, 3:25

Fourth quarter

- (09:48) SFA TD – Allen Arclies III 10-yard pass from Trae Self, Storm Ruiz kick
  Nicholls 35–30; Drive: 3 plays, 56 yards, 1:04
- (03:29) NICH TD – Chase Fourcade 6-yard rush, Gunner Jones kick
  Nicholls 41–30; Drive: 6 plays, 57 yards, 2:52
- (01:54) NICH TD – Julien Gums 4-yard rush, Gunner Jones kick
  Nicholls 48–30; Drive: 3 plays, 22 yards, 1:08

Top passers

- NICH - Chase Fourcade - 12/16, 145 yards, TD, INT
- SFA - Trae Self - 24/43, 354 yards, 2 TD, INT

Top rushers

- NICH - Julien Gums - 22 carries, 135 yards, 3 TD
- SFA - Da'Leon Ward - 12 carries, 26 yards

Top receivers

- NICH - Stefano Guarisco - 4 receptions, 51 yards, TD
- SFA - Calvin Clater - 5 receptions, 80 yards

Statistics	Nicholls	Stephen F. Austin
First downs	31	17
Total yards	436	414
Rushing yards	291	58
Passing yards	145	356
Turnovers	1	1
Time of possession	35:31	24:29

=== At Texas State ===
Nicholls at Texas State – Game summary

Quarter	1	2	3	4	Total
No. 12 (FCS) Colonels	0	3	0	0	3
Bobcats	3	0	14	7	24

at Bobcat Stadium, San Marcos, TX

- Date: September 28
- Game time: 6:00 p.m. CDT
- Game weather: 86 °F (30 °C); partly cloudy
- Game attendance: 19,159
- Referee: Kyle Olson
- TV: ESPN3

Game information

First quarter

- (08:15) TXST FG – Joshua Rowland 36-yard field goal
  Texas State 3–0; Drive: 9 plays, 46 yards, 5:12

Second quarter

- (13:05) NICH FG – Gunner Jones 39-yard field goal
  Tied 3–3; Drive: 14 plays, 60 yards, 6:42

Third quarter

- (09:20) TXST TD – Micah Hilts 12-yard pass from Gresch Jensen, Joshua Rowland kick
  Texas State 10–3; Drive: 14 plays, 78 yards, 5:32
- (06:42) TXST TD – Gresch Jensen 1-yard rush, Joshua Rowland kick
  Texas State 17–3; Drive: 6 plays, 56 yards, 1:56

Fourth quarter

- (14:02) TXST TD – Javen Banks 77-yard pass from Gresch Jensen, Joshua Rowland kick
  Texas State 24–3; Drive: 2 plays, 80 yards, 0:45

Top passers

- TXST - Gresch Jensen - 22/29, 253 yards, 2 TD, INT
- NICH - Chase Fourcade - 15/27, 145 yards, INT

Top rushers

- TXST - Caleb Twyford - 17 carries, 73 yards
- NICH - Chase Fourcade - 8 carries, 25 yards

Top receivers

- TXST - Javen Banks - reception, 77 yards, TD
- NICH - Dai'Jean Dixon - 5 receptions, 54 yards

Statistics	Nicholls	Texas State
First downs	12	16
Total yards	220	362
Rushing yards	75	109
Passing yards	145	253
Turnovers	2	1
Time of possession	27:17	32:43

=== Central Arkansas ===
Central Arkansas at Nicholls – Game summary

Quarter	1	2	3	4	Total
No. 11 Bears	0	0	7	7	14
No. 16 Colonels	6	14	7	7	34

at Manning Field at John L. Guidry Stadium, Thibodaux, LA

- Date: October 5
- Game time: 3:00 p.m. CDT
- Game weather: 91 °F (33 °C); clear
- Game attendance: 7,021
- Referee: Vidal Jones

Game information

First quarter

- (10:58) NICH TD – Chase Fourcade 1-yard rush, Gunnar Jones PAT failed
  Nicholls 6–0; Drive: 9 plays, 90 yards, 4:02

Second quarter

- (14:56) NICH TD – Julien Gums 8-yard rush, Gunnar Jones kick
  Nicholls 13–0; Drive: 3 plays, 15 yards, 0:57
- (04:02) NICH TD – Julien Gums 36-yard rush, Gunnar Jones kick
  Nicholls 20–0; Drive: 6 plays, 75 yards, 2:27

Third quarter

- (09:50) UCA TD – Lujuan Winningham 4-yard pass from Breylin Smith, Hayden Ray kick
  Nicholls 20–7; Drive: 12 plays, 75 yards, 5:10
- (03:03) NICH TD – Jordan Talley 26-yard pass from Chase Fourcade, Gunnar Jones kick
  Nicholls 27–7; Drive: 8 plays, 73 yards, 4:21

Fourth quarter

- (11:33) NICH TD – Kendall Bussey 8-yard rush, Gunnar Jones kick
  Nicholls 34–7; Drive: 9 plays, 49 yards, 4:28
- (00:06) UCA TD – Kylan Robinson 44-yard pass from Breylin Smith, Hayden Ray kick
  Nicholls 34–14; Drive: 7 plays, 67 yards, 1:43

Top passers

- NICH - Chase Fourcade - 24/29, 327 yards, TD, INT
- UCA - Breylin Smith - 20/27, 182 yards, 2 TD, INT

Top rushers

- NICH - Julien Gums - 5 carries, 51 yards, 2 TD
- UCA - Kierre Crossley - 11 carries, 66 yards

Top receivers

- NICH - Dai'Jean Dixon - 5 receptions, 140 yards
- UCA - Kylan Robinson - reception, 44 yards, TD

Statistics	Central Arkansas	Nicholls
First downs	18	23
Total yards	320	477
Rushing yards	138	150
Passing yards	182	327
Turnovers	2	2
Time of possession	26:18	33:42

=== Northwestern State ===
Northwestern State at Nicholls – Game summary

Quarter	1	2	3	4	Total
Demons	0	7	14	14	35
No. 12 Colonels	14	10	7	14	45

at Manning Field at John L. Guidry Stadium, Thibodaux, LA

- Date: October 12
- Game time: 3:00 p.m. CDT
- Game weather: 70 °F (21 °C); overcast
- Game attendance: 8,103
- Referee: Dan Lewis
- TV: CST

Game information

First quarter

- (12:25) NICH TD – Chase Fourcade 13-yard rush, Gunnar Jones kick
  Nicholls 7–0; Drive: 4 plays, 32 yards, 1:50
- (01:33) NICH TD – Dontrell Taylor 1-yard rush, Gunnar Jones kick
  Nicholls 14–0; Drive: 12 plays, 74 yards, 6:43

Second quarter

- (14:56) NSU TD – Jared West 1-yard rush, Ryan Gremillion kick
  Nicholls 14–7; Drive: 5 plays, 75 yards, 1:37
- (04:57) NICH TD – Chase Fourcade 29-yard rush, Gunnar Jones kick
  Nicholls 21–7; Drive: 11 plays, 77 yards, 5:15
- (00:00) NICH FG – Gunnar Jones 20-yard field goal
  Nicholls 24–7; Drive: 8 plays, 60 yards, 3:21

Third quarter

- (11:27) NICH TD – Julien Gums 10-yard pass from Chase Fourcade, Gunnar Jones kick
  Nicholls 31–7; Drive: 7 plays, 33 yards, 3:21
- (10:13) NSU TD – Quan Shorts 23-yard pass from Shelton Eppler, Ryan Gremillion kick
  Nicholls 31–14; Drive: 4 plays, 69 yards, 1:09
- (03:12) NSU TD – Gavin Landry 6-yard pass from Shelton Eppler, Ryan Gremillion kick
  Nicholls 31–21; Drive: 7 plays, 67 yards, 2:40

Fourth quarter

- (14:23) NICH TD – Dontrell Taylor 27-yard rush, Gunnar Jones kick
  Nicholls 38–21; Drive: 8 plays, 75 yards, 3:49
- (10:09) NSU TD – Akile Davis 9-yard pass from Shelton Eppler, Ryan Gremillion kick
  Nicholls 38–28; Drive: 8 plays, 75 yards, 4:08
- (02:31) NICH TD – Dontrell Taylor 3-yard rush, Gunnar Jones kick
  Nicholls 45–28; Drive: 8 plays, 62 yards, 3:32
- (00:32) NSU TD – Quan Shorts 1-yard pass from Shelton Eppler, Ryan Gremillion kick
  Nicholls 45–35; Drive: 7 plays, 77 yards, 1:51

Top passers

- NICH – Chase Fourcade – 20/29, 188 yards, TD, INT
- NSU – Shelton Eppler – 27/37, 387 yards, 4 TD

Top rushers

- NICH – Chase Fourcade – 14 carries, 135 yards, 2 TD
- NSU – Jared West – 10 carries, 33 yards, TD

Top receivers

- NICH – Tahj Smith – 4 receptions, 70 yards
- NSU – Akile Davis – 7 receptions, 155 yards, TD

Statistics	Northwestern State	Nicholls
First downs	21	30
Total yards	428	537
Rushing yards	41	349
Passing yards	387	188
Turnovers	1	1
Time of possession	22:32	37:28

=== At Sam Houston State ===
Nicholls at Sam Houston State – Game summary

Quarter	1	2	3	4	Total
No. 9 Colonels	0	0	0	0	0
Bearkats	7	3	7	0	17

at Bowers Stadium, Huntsville, TX

- Date: October 19
- Game time: 2:00 p.m. CDT
- Game weather: 83 °F (28 °C); sunny & clear
- Game attendance: 3,953
- Referee: Brad Van Vark
- TV: ESPN+

Game information

First quarter

- (07:53) SHSU TD – Brennon Tibbs 15-yard pass from Ty Brock, Hunter Pinegar kick
  Sam Houston State 7–0; Drive: 10 plays, 80 yards, 3:46

Second quarter

- (13:30) SHSU TD – Hunter Pinegar 40-yard field goal
  Sam Houston State 10–0; Drive: 6 plays, 53 yards, 2:40

Third quarter

- (00:43) SHSU TD – Ife Adeyi 47-yard pass from Ryan Humphries, Hunter Pinegar kick
  Sam Houston State 17–0; Drive: 1 play, 47 yards, 0:16

Top passers

- SHSU – Ty Brock – 6/13, 116 yards, TD
- NICH – Chase Fourcade – 19/34, 212 yards, INT

Top rushers

- SHSU – Ryan Humphries – 11 carries, 39 yards
- NICH – Julien Gums – 9 carries, 25 yards

Top receivers

- SHSU – Woody Brandom – 5 receptions, 90 yards
- NICH – Dion Ray – 3 receptions, 60 yards

Statistics	Nicholls	Sam Houston State
First downs	14	13
Total yards	271	295
Rushing yards	55	104
Passing yards	216	191
Turnovers	3	0
Time of possession	29:26	30:34

=== Abilene Christian ===
Abilene Christian at Nicholls – Game summary

Quarter	1	2	3	4	OT	Total
Wildcats	0	17	14	0	6	37
No. 15 Colonels	7	7	7	10	0	31

at Manning Field at John L. Guidry Stadium, Thibodaux, LA

- Date: October 26
- Game time: 3:00 p.m. CDT
- Game weather: 65 °F (18 °C); cloudy
- Game attendance: 5,012
- Referee: Ed Bourgeois
- TV: CST

Game information

First quarter

- (05:57) NICH TD – Julien Gums 2-yard rush, Gunnar Jones kick
  Nicholls 7–0; Drive: 5 plays, 82 yards, 2:10

Second quarter

- (14:09) ACU FG – Blair Zepeda 22-yard field goal
  Nicholls 7–3; Drive: 15 plays, 67 yards, 6:41
- (11:25) NICH TD – Julien Gums 21-yard rush, Gunnar Jones kick
  Nicholls 14–3; Drive: 6 plays, 75 yards, 2:44
- (07:35) ACU TD – Sema'J Davis 13-yard rush, Blair Zepeda kick
  Nicholls 14–10; Drive: 9 plays, 75 yards, 3:43
- (00:00) ACU TD – Tracy James 1-yard rush, Blair Zepeda kick
  Abilene Christian 17–14; Drive: 17 plays, 61 yards, 5:17

Third quarter

- (10:22) ACU TD – Josh Finks 11-yard pass from Luke Anthony, Blair Zepeda kick
  Abilene Christian 24–14; Drive: 12 plays, 73 yards, 4:32
- (04:24) NICH TD – Bry'Kiethon Mouton 1-yard pass from Chase Fourcade, Gunnar Jones kick
  Abilene Christian 24–21; Drive: 4 plays, 5 yards, 1:49
- (03:14) ACU TD – Sema'J Davis 4-yard rush, Blair Zepeda kick
  Abilene Christian 31–21; Drive: 3 plays, 44 yards, 1:01

Fourth quarter

- (12:09) NICH TD – Chase Fourcade 1-yard rush, Gunnar Jones kick
  Abilene Christian 31–28; Drive: 5 plays, 39 yards, 1:52
- (01:53) NICH TD – Gunnar Jones 19-yard field goal
  Tied 31–31; Drive: 10 plays, 73 yards, 3:37

First overtime

- ACU TD – Tracy James 5-yard rush
  Abilene Christian 37–31; Drive: 5 plays, 25 yards

Top passers

- ACU – Luke Anthony – 25/37, 181 yards, TD, 2 INT
- NICH – Chase Fourcade – 17/22, 216 yards, TD, INT

Top rushers

- ACU – Sema'J Davis – 19 carries, 146 yards, 2 TD
- NICH – Julien Gums – 15 carries, 79 yards, 2 TD

Top receivers

- ACU – Kobe Clark – 11 receptions, 72 yards
- NICH – Dion Ray – 6 receptions, 128 yards°

Statistics	Abilene Christian	Nicholls
First downs	33	19
Total yards	472	369
Rushing yards	282	153
Passing yards	190	216
Turnovers	2	4
Time of possession	36:47	23:13

=== At Incarnate Word ===
Nicholls at Incarnate Word – Game summary

Quarter	1	2	3	4	Total
No. 25 Colonels	6	14	0	7	27
Cardinals	6	10	0	7	23

at Gayle and Tom Benson Stadium, San Antonio, TX

- Date: November 2
- Game time: 4:00 p.m. CDT
- Game weather: 69 °F (21 °C); mostly sunny
- Game attendance: 3,928
- Referee: Christian Watso

Game information

First quarter

- (11:00) UIW FG – Carson Mohr 29-yard field goal
  Incarnate Word 3–0; Drive: 13 plays, 73 yards, 4:00
- (07:25) UIW FG – Carson Mohr 40-yard field goal
  Incarnate Word 6–0; Drive: 7 plays, 4 yards, 2:03
- (04:44) NICH TD – Julien Gums 9-yard rush, Gunnar Jones PAT failed
  Tied 6–6; Drive: 9 plays, 65 yards, 2:35

Second quarter

- (13:40) UIW TD – Ameer King 1-yard pass from Jon Copeland, Carson Mohr kick
  Incarnate Word 13–6; Drive: 6 plays, 61 yards, 2:21
- (12:26) NICH TD – K. J. Franklin 32-yard pass from Chase Fourcade, Gunnar Jones kick
  Tied 13–13; Drive: 3 plays, 64 yards, 1:08
- (06:37) UIW FG – Carson Mohr 27-yard field goal
  Incarnate Word 16–13; Drive: 8 plays, 60 yards, 2:25
- (01:24) NICH TD – Chase Fourcade 64-yard rush, Gunnar Jones kick
  Nicholls 20–16; Drive: 8 plays, 89 yards, 2:41

Fourth quarter

- (07:49) UIW TD – Kevin Brown 1-yard rush, Carson Mohr kick
  Incarnate Word 23–20; Drive: 6 plays, 74 yards, 1:50
- (03:27) NICH TD – Julien Gums 1-yard rush, Gunnar Jones kick
  Nicholls 27–23; Drive: 9 plays, 74 yards, 4:16

Top passers

- NICH – Chase Fourcade – 10/21, 150 yards, TD
- UIW – Jon Copeland – 34/55, 381 yards, TD

Top rushers

- NICH – Julien Gums – 23 carries, 178 yards, 2 TD
- UIW – Kevin Brown – 9 carries, 59 yards, TD

Top receivers

- NICH – K. J. Franklin – 3 receptions, 81 yards, TD
- UIW – CJ Hardy – 7 receptions, 102 yards

Statistics	Nicholls	Incarnate Word
First downs	17	27
Total yards	424	483
Rushing yards	274	102
Passing yards	150	381
Turnovers	2	0
Time of possession	28:51	31:09

=== Houston Baptist ===
Houston Baptist at Nicholls – Game summary

Quarter	1	2	3	4	Total
Huskies	10	10	0	7	27
No. 25 Colonels	13	14	14	7	48

at Manning Field at John L. Guidry Stadium, Thibodaux, LA

- Date: November 9
- Game time: 3:00 p.m. CDT
- Game weather: 65 °F (18 °C); clear & sunny
- Game attendance: 4,558
- Referee: Vidal Jones
- TV: CST

Game information

First quarter

- (12:01) NICH TD – Julien Gums 1-yard rush, Gunnar Jones PAT failed
  Nicholls 6–0; Drive: 7 plays, 75 yards, 2:59
- (07:03) HBU FG – Gino Garcia 30-yard field goal
  Nicholls 6–3; Drive: 13 plays, 62 yards, 4:52
- (01:01) NICH TD – Julien Gums 10-yard rush, Gavin Lasseigne kick
  Nicholls 13–3; Drive: 8 plays, 86 yards, 3:16
- (00:49) HBU TD – Gamar Girdy Brito 93-yard kickoff returned; Gino Garcia kick
  Nicholls 13–10; Drive: 0 plays, 0 yards, 0:00

Second quarter

- (11:59) HBU TD – Terry Tillmon 17-yard pass from Bailey Zappe, Gino Garcia kick
  Houston Baptist 17–13; Drive: 7 plays, 92 yards, 1:34
- (04:50) NICH TD – Julien Gums 4-yard rush, Gavin Lasseigne kick
  Nicholls 20–17; Drive: 2 plays, 19 yards, 0:31
- (01:50) HBU FG – Gino Garcia 31-yard field goal
  Tied 20–20; Drive: 4 plays, 6 yards, 1:29
- (01:00) NICH TD – David Robinson Jr. 38-yard pass from Chase Fourcade, Gavin Lasseigne kick
  Nicholls 27–20; Drive: 4 plays, 64 yards, 0:40

Third quarter

- (05:23) NICH TD – Jordan Talley 8-yard pass from Chase Fourcade, Gavin Lasseigne kick
  Nicholls 34–20; Drive: 11 plays, 64 yards, 5:41
- (02:03) NICH TD – Chase Fourcade 2-yard rush, Gavin Lasseigne kick
  Nicholls 41–20; Drive: 6 plays, 60 yards, 2:37

Fourth quarter

- (10:15) HBU TD – Dreshawn Minnieweather 2-yard rush, Gino Garcia kick
  Nicholls 41–27; Drive: 1 play, 2 yards, 0:07
- (03:26) NICH TD – Chase Fourcade 1-yard rush, Gavin Lasseigne kick
  Nicholls 48–27; Drive: 12 plays, 75 yards, 6:49

Top passers

- NICH – Chase Fourcade – 17/23, 294 yards, 2 TD, INT
- HBU – Bailey Zappe – 26/41, 246 yards, TD, INT

Top rushers

- NICH – Julien Gums – 22 carries, 104 yards, 3 TD
- HBU – Dreshawn Minnieweather – 15 carries, 145 yards, TD

Top receivers

- NICH – Dion Ray – 7 receptions, 145 yards
- HBU – Jerreth Sterns – 8 receptions, 88 yards

Statistics	Houston Baptist	Nicholls
First downs	21	26
Total yards	428	515
Rushing yards	182	207
Passing yards	246	308
Turnovers	3	1
Time of possession	23:02	36:58

=== McNeese State ===
McNeese State at Nicholls – Game summary

Quarter	1	2	3	4	Total
Cowboys	7	0	7	6	20
No. 24 Colonels	10	17	0	7	34

at Manning Field at John L. Guidry Stadium, Thibodaux, LA

- Date: November 16
- Game time: 3:00 p.m. CDT
- Game weather: 63 °F (17 °C); clear
- Game attendance: 8,958
- Referee: Mike Vandervelde
- TV: CST

Game information

First quarter

- (11:57) NICH FG – Gavin Lasseigne 25-yard field goal
  Nicholls 3–0; Drive: 7 plays, 67 yards, 3:03
- (07:39) NICH TD – Dion Ray 55-yard pass from Chase Fourcade, Gavin Lasseigne kick
  Nicholls 10–0; Drive: 6 plays, 81 yards, 2:21
- (07:25) MCNS TD – Mason Pierce 95-yard kickoff returned, Bailey Raborn kick
  Nicholls 10–7; Drive: 0 plays, 0 yards, 0:00

Second quarter

- (14:08) NICH TD – Jordan Talley 14-yard pass from Chase Fourcade, Gavin Lasseigne kick
  Nicholls 17–7; Drive: 4 plays, 57 yards, 1:23
- (10:29) NICH TD – Dai'Jean Dixon 55-yard pass from Chase Fourcade, Gavin Lasseigne kick
  Nicholls 24–7; Drive: 2 plays, 55 yards, 0:13
- (00:04) NICH FG – Gavin Lasseigne 26-yard field goal
  Nicholls 27–7; Drive: 10 plays, 71 yards, 2:11

Third quarter

- (06:25) MCNS TD – Trevor Begue 5-yard pass from Cody Orgeron, Bailey Raborn kick
  Nicholls 27–14; Drive: 5 plays, 28 yards, 1:43

Fourth quarter

- (05:45) NICH TD – Julien Gums 2-yard rush, Gavin Lasseigne kick
  Nicholls 34–14; Drive: 11 plays, 88 yards, 6:27
- (03:09) MCNS TD – Draysean Hudson 4-yard pass from Cody Orgeron, Bailey Raborn PAT blocked
  Nicholls 34–20; Drive: 11 plays, 91 yards, 2:31

Top passers

- NICH – Chase Fourcade – 21/35, 374 yards, 3 TD, INT
- MCNS – Cody Orgeron – 18/36, 184 yards, 2 TD

Top rushers

- NICH – Julien Gums – 17 carries, 56 yards, TD
- MCNS – Justin Pratt – 10 carries, 24 yards

Top receivers

- NICH – Dai'Jean Dixon – 7 receptions, 185 yards, TD
- MCNS – Trevor Begue – 6 receptions, 67 yards, TD

Statistics	McNeese State	Nicholls
First downs	14	24
Total yards	236	519
Rushing yards	52	145
Passing yards	184	374
Turnovers	1	2
Time of possession	27:12	32:48

=== At Southeastern Louisiana ===
Nicholls at Southeastern Louisiana – Game summary

Quarter	1	2	3	4	Total
No. 23 Colonels	0	14	7	7	28
No. 21 Lions	14	0	0	13	27

at Strawberry Stadium, Hammond, LA

- Date: November 21
- Game time: 6:00 p.m. CDT
- Game weather: 70 °F (21 °C); partly cloudy
- Game attendance: 10,071
- Referee: Ed Bourgeois
- TV: CST

Game information

First quarter

- (04:45) SELA TD – Devonte Williams 2-yard pass from Cole Kelley, Bryce Broussard kick
  Southeastern Louisiana 7–0; Drive: 10 plays, 81 yards, 4:40
- (00:00) SELA TD – Devonte Williams 61-yard punt returned, Bryce Broussard kick
  Southeastern Louisiana 14–0; Drive: 3 plays, 1 yard, 1:41

Second quarter

- (11:43) NICH TD – Dai'Jean Dixon 48-yard pass from Chase Fourcade, Gavin Lasseigne kick
  Southeastern Louisiana 14–7; Drive: 6 plays, 88 yards, 3:10
- (05:34) NICH TD – Dai'Jean Dixon 2-yard pass from Chase Fourcade, Gavin Lasseigne kick
  Tied 14–14; Drive: 9 plays, 91 yards, 4:31

Third quarter

- (00:20) NICH TD – Julien Gums 5-yard rush, Gavin Lasseigne kick
  Nicholls 21–14; Drive: 9 plays, 66 yards, 4:38

Fourth quarter

- (11:34) SELA TD – Devonte Williams 4-yard rush, Bryce Broussard kick
  Tied 21–21; Drive: 10 plays, 82 yards, 3:40
- (02:21) SELA TD – Austin Mitchell 17-yard pass from Chason Virgil, Bryce Broussard PAT failed
  Southeastern Louisiana 27–21; Drive: 3 plays, 29 yards, 0:46
- (01:30) NICH TD – Dai'Jean Dixon 57-yard pass from Chase Fourcade, Gavin Lasseigne kick
  Nicholls 28–27; Drive: 3 plays, 78 yards, 0:45

Top passers

- NICH – Chase Fourcade – 19/27, 288 yards, 3 TD, INT
- SELA – Chason Virgil – 25/45, 321 yards, TD, INT

Top rushers

- NICH – Julien Gums – 18 carries, 133 yards, TD
- SELA – Devonte Williams – 16 carries, 75 yards, TD

Top receivers

- NICH – Dai'Jean Dixon – 9 receptions, 190 yards, 3 TD
- SELA – Austin Mitchell – 8 receptions, 99 yards, TD

Statistics	Nicholls	Southeastern Louisiana
First downs	17	26
Total yards	468	460
Rushing yards	180	113
Passing yards	228	347
Turnovers	2	2
Time of possession	31:15	28:45

=== North Dakota—NCAA Division I First Round ===
The Colonels received an automatic bid (due to winning their conference) for the postseason tournament, with a first-round pairing against North Dakota.

North Dakota at Nicholls – Game summary

Quarter	1	2	3	4	Total
No. 24 Fighting Hawks	0	3	3	0	6
No. 19 Colonels	3	7	7	7	24

at Manning Field at John L. Guidry Stadium, Thibodaux, LA

- Date: November 30
- Game time: 3:00 p.m. CDT
- Game weather: 78 °F (26 °C); overcast
- Game attendance: 7,569
- Referee: Nathan Black
- TV: ESPN3

Game information

First quarter

- (06:34) NICH FG – Gavin Lasseigne 27-yard field goal
  Nicholls 3–0; Drive: 11 plays, 60 yards, 5:40

Second quarter

- (02:12) NICH TD – Chase Fourcade 1-yard rush, Gavin Lasseigne kick
  Nicholls 10–0; Drive: 1 play, 1 yard, 0:05
- (00:00) UND FG – Brady Leach 34-yard field goal
  Nicholls 10–3; Drive: 7 plays, 46 yards, 2:06

Third quarter

- (06:50) UND FG – Brady Leach 42-yard field goal
  Nicholls 10–6; Drive: 10 plays, 55 yards, 3:47
- (04:22) NICH TD – Dai'Jean Dixon 45-yard pass from Chase Fourcade, Gavin Lasseigne kick
  Nicholls 17–6; Drive: 5 plays, 75 yards, 2:28

Fourth quarter

- (02:28) NICH TD – Dontrell Taylor 2-yard rush, Gavin Lasseigne kick
  Nicholls 24–6; Drive: 7 plays, 51 yards, 3:56

Top passers

- NICH – Chase Fourcade – 14/16, 165 yards, TD
- UND – Nate Ketteringham – 27/47, 269 yards, INT

Top rushers

- NICH – Julien Gums – 16 carries, 172 yards
- UND – Nate Ketteringham – 7 carries, 20 yards

Top receivers

- NICH – Dai'Jean Dixon – 8 receptions, 122 yards, TD
- UND – Travis Toivonen – 10 receptions, 121 yards

Statistics	North Dakota	Nicholls
First downs	21	23
Total yards	316	481
Rushing yards	44	316
Passing yards	272	165
Turnovers	2	1
Time of possession	25:02	34:58

=== At North Dakota State—NCAA Division I Second Round ===
Nicholls at North Dakota State – Game summary

Quarter	1	2	3	4	Total
No. 19 Colonels	3	7	3	0	13
No. 1 Bison	7	7	10	13	37

at Fargodome, Fargo, ND

- Date: December 7
- Game time: 2:30 p.m. CDT
- Game weather: 70 °F (21 °C); N/A (indoors)
- Game attendance: 15,690
- Referee: Bob Johnson
- TV: ESPN3

Game information

First quarter

- (03:03) NICH FG – Gavin Lasseigne 35-yard field goal
  Nicholls 3–0; Drive: 9 plays, 62 yards, 3:17
- (00:00) NDSU TD – Phoenix Sproles 55-yard rush, Will Cardinal kick
  North Dakota State 7–3; Drive: 6 plays, 84 yards, 0:00

Second quarter

- (12:53) NICH TD – Dai'Jean Dixon 25-yard pass from Chase Fourcade, Gavin Lasseigne kick
  Nicholls 10–7; Drive: 12 plays, 82 yards, 0:00
- (04:13) NDSU TD – Jimmy Kepouros 43-yard pass from Trey Lance, Will Cardinal kick
  North Dakota State 14–10; Drive: 6 plays, 80 yards, 3:36

Third quarter

- (10:36) NICH FG – Gavin Lasseigne 23-yard field goal
  North Dakota State 14–13; Drive: 8 plays, 69 yards, 4:24
- (06:26) NDSU FG – Will Cardinal 32-yard field goal
  North Dakota State 17–13; Drive: 4 plays, 2 yards, 1:26
- (02:58) NDSU TD – Noah Gindorff 3-yard pass from Trey Lance, Will Cardinal kick
  North Dakota State 24–13; Drive: 4 plays, 13 yards, 1:55

Fourth quarter

- (08:21) NDSU TD – Trey Lance 6-yard rush, Will Cardinal kick
  North Dakota State 31–13; Drive: 12 plays, 85 yards, 6:30
- (03:12) NDSU TD – Dimitri Williams 3-yard rush, Will Cardinal PAT failed
  North Dakota State 37–13; Drive: 5 plays, 44 yards, 2:58

Top passers

- NDSU – Trey Lance – 10/16, 169 yards, 2 TD
- NICH – Chase Fourcade – 11/15, 94 yards, TD, 2 INT

Top rushers

- NDSU – Trey Lance – 11 carries, 88 yards, TD
- NICH – Julien Gums – 15 carries, 77 yards

Top receivers

- NDSU – Jimmy Kepouros – 2 receptions, 62 yards, TD
- NICH – Dai'Jean Dixon – 4 receptions, 66 yards, TD

Statistics	Nicholls	North Dakota State
First downs	18	21
Total yards	265	434
Rushing yards	171	265
Passing yards	94	169
Turnovers	2	0
Time of possession	26:31	33:29

== Ranking movements ==
Ranking movements Legend: ██ Increase in ranking ██ Decrease in ranking RV = Received votes т = Tied with team above or below
	Week														
Poll	Pre	1	2	3	4	5	6	7	8	9	10	11	12	13	Final
STATS FCS	12	10	12	13	12-T	16	12	9	15	25	25	24	23	19	
Coaches	11	10	11	9	9	15	12	9	15	24	RV	24	23	19	
