= John Mitchell (American football) =

American football player and coach (born 1951)

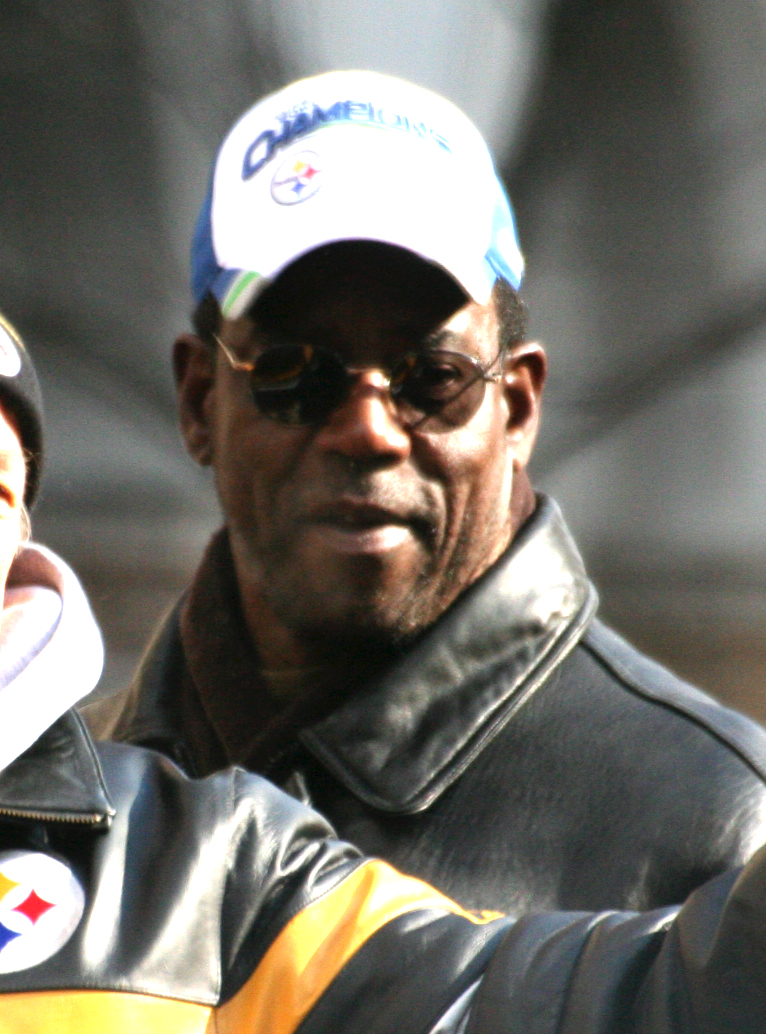
- Mitchell in Pittsburgh's Super Bowl XLIII parade

Personal information
- Born: October 14, 1951 (age 75); Mobile, Alabama, U.S.
- Listed height: 6 ft 3 in (1.91 m)
- Listed weight: 230 lb (104 kg)

Career information
- High school: Williamson (Mobile)
- College: Alabama; Eastern Arizona
- NFL draft: 1973: 7th round, 174th overall pick

Career history

Playing
- San Francisco 49ers (1973)*
- * Offseason or practice squad member only

Coaching
- Alabama (1973–1976) Defensive ends coach; Arkansas (1977–1982) Defensive line coach; Birmingham Stallions (1983–1985) Linebackers coach; Temple (1986) Defensive line coach; LSU (1987–1989) Outside linebackers coach; LSU (1990) Defensive coordinator and linebackers coach; Cleveland Browns (1991–1993) Defensive line coach; Pittsburgh Steelers (1994–2006) Defensive line coach; Pittsburgh Steelers (2007–2017) Assistant head coach and defensive line coach; Pittsburgh Steelers (2018–2022) Assistant head coach

Awards and highlights
- As coach: 2× Super Bowl champion (as coach) — XL (2005), XLIII (2008); 2012 Pittsburgh Pro Football Hall of Fame; NCAA Football National Champion (as coach) — 1973 (Alabama); As player: First-team All-American (1972); First-team All-SEC (1972); 2× Junior College All-America selection — 1969 & 1970; Alabama Sports Hall of Fame inductee (class of 2009)

Career NFL statistics
- Tackles: 125
- Sacks: 8
- Forced fumbles: 5
- Fumble recoveries: 1

John Mitchell Jr. (born October 14, 1951) is an American former football coach and collegiate player. Over the course of his career, Mitchell has broken several racial barriers, one of which was being the first black player for the Alabama Crimson Tide. He served on the staff of the Pittsburgh Steelers from 1994 until his retirement following the 2022 season.

As a player, Mitchell was the first African-American to play football for the storied Alabama Crimson Tide. In his second year with the program he became the first African-American co-captain at the school. The next year, he became the team's first black assistant coach and also the youngest coach to have ever been hired at Alabama. Later he would break another barrier by becoming the first black defensive coordinator in the Southeastern Conference.

His coaching career spanned 50 years during which time he worked with several icons of the football coaching pantheon, including college coaching greats Bear Bryant and Lou Holtz as well as Bill Belichick, Bill Cowher, and Mike Tomlin in the pros. Teams he has coached have won championships at both the college and professional levels.

== Early life ==
Mitchell was born in Mobile, Alabama, on October 14, 1951; the third of five children of Helen and John Mitchell Sr. His father worked as a civil engineer for the United States Coast Guard.

At Williamson High School in Mobile, which was an all-black school, Mitchell played football and basketball. As a senior, he played on the offensive line. Though standing 6 feet 3 inches (191 cm), he weighed just 195 pounds (88 kg), which major colleges considered too light for the position. His lack of size explains why he was not offered a football scholarship out of high school by any major colleges in his home state. He did, however, field football scholarship offers from historically black powerhouses like Grambling State University and Tennessee State University.

Sports were not everything for Mitchell; he finished third in the nation in a science fair with a group of classmates. All five members of the science fair team were offered academic scholarships by the University of Alabama and Auburn University. Although these were the two schools Mitchell had dreamed of playing football for, neither was recruiting black football players at the time, and Mitchell very much wanted to play "big-time college football".

Mitchell determined that his best chance of eventually playing Division I football was by going the junior college route. He accepted a football scholarship from Eastern Arizona Junior College in Thatcher, Arizona.

== Playing career ==
Mitchell played on both the offensive and defensive lines at Eastern Arizona. He was named a Junior College All-American in each of his two years in the program. More significantly, he added 35 pounds (16 kg) of muscle to his frame in the school's weight training program, which was an amenity his high school lacked. Even with the added bulk, he showed no appreciable loss of speed. He also earned an associate's degree in social work from Eastern Arizona.

Based on his junior college performance and increased bulk, Mitchell was recruited by several major college programs, but he originally committed to John McKay at the University of Southern California. While on the golf course with University of Alabama coach Paul "Bear" Bryant, McKay casually mentioned that he had received a commitment from an Alabama native. McKay assumed that Bryant would not be interested in Mitchell because he was black and Alabama had no black players on their roster. Bryant swooped in and recruited Mitchell aggressively. Although Mitchell originally was a bit nervous about the reception he would receive at Alabama, as well as the amount of playing time he could garner, his family encouraged him to return home and accept Bryant's scholarship offer. Besides his family's encouragement and Bryant's assurances that his race would not be a problem, Mitchell's opinion that Alabama's School of Social Work was an easy route was a big factor in his decision.

In 1971 Mitchell, along with Wilbur Jackson, became the first African-American to play football for the Crimson Tide. He started all 24 games in his two seasons at Alabama, during which time the team compiled a 21–3 record and won two Southeastern Conference championships. In 1972, Mitchell became the first African-American to be named a co-captain at Alabama. The same year he was named an All-American by the American Football Coaches Association. He was selected to the All-SEC team in each of his two seasons at Alabama. Mitchell earned a B.S. in social welfare, completing his degree requirements a semester early.

The San Francisco 49ers selected Mitchell 174th overall in the seventh round of the 1973 NFL draft. Although he played primarily defensive end in college, he was once again considered undersized to fill that role in the pro game; the 49ers wanted to make him a linebacker. He signed a contract with the 49ers and attended training camp, but after being slowed in camp by an illness he was cut by the team prior to the season.

Upon being cut by the 49ers, Mitchell chose to close the book on this playing career even though he may have been able to pursue an opportunity in the fledgling World Football League, saying, "I had a chance, whatever happened, good or bad, and I figured a guy's got to work someday."

== Coaching career ==
=== Alabama ===
Mitchell decided to return to Alabama to attend law school in the fall of 1973. When he asked coach Bryant for help in finding a campus job to make ends meet while he worked on his graduate degree, Bryant instead offered him a full-time coaching position. In giving up his law school plans to accept the offer to coach defensive ends, Mitchell became the first African-American assistant coach for the Crimson Tide. He was also the youngest coach to have been hired by the school. In addition to coaching, he was instrumental in the recruiting of top African-American players to play football at Alabama. One player whom Mitchell helped recruit was Ozzie Newsome, who went on to have a Hall of Fame career.

In Mitchell's first year of coaching at Alabama, the team compiled an 11–1 record and won the national championship in addition to the SEC championship. Over each of the next two seasons, they matched that 11–1 record, added two more SEC titles and finished inside the top-five in the polls. In 1976, which would be Mitchell's last with the team, they fell off a bit with a 9–3 record, but they still remained in the top-fifteen nationwide. Mitchell helped develop Leroy Cook who was a two-time All-America selection drafted in the 10th round of the 1976 NFL draft by the Dallas Cowboys and selected as one of two defensive ends on the All-time Alabama team named by Sports Illustrated in 2006.

=== Arkansas ===
In early 1977, Mitchell accepted a position coaching defensive ends at the University of Arkansas under Lou Holtz, after deciding the move was "at least horizontal". Following his first season with the Razorbacks in which the team went 11–1 and beat second-ranked Oklahoma in the Orange Bowl, Holtz gushed,

John Mitchell is without a doubt one of the brightest young assistant coaches in the nation. He should become a tremendous head coach one day. I even fear for my job after people realize his contribution to us winning this year.

In the course of the six years Mitchell would spend at Arkansas, the team compiled a record of 54–16–2, won a Southwest Conference championship, played in a bowl game each year and failed to finish in the top-20 in the polls only once. Among the defensive linemen who came through the Arkansas program during Mitchell's tenure were future Pro Football Hall of Fame member Dan Hampton and Ron Faurot an All-American who was drafted in the second round and played two seasons in the NFL. During his time in Arkansas, Mitchell regularly participated in pick-up basketball games with Bill Clinton, who was at the time a law professor at the school.

=== USFL ===
Mitchell left Arkansas in 1983 to pursue an opportunity to coach at the professional level in his home state with the Birmingham Stallions of the newly created United States Football League (USFL). He coached linebackers for the Stallions for the team's (and league's) entire three-year existence. In 1985, outside linebacker Herb Spencer made the All-League team. When the team quit paying its coaches on New Year's Day in 1986, Mitchell returned to the college ranks, taking at a job at Temple University.

=== Temple ===
At Temple Mitchell coached defensive tackles and defensive ends under head coach Bruce Arians, with whom he would later work on the Steelers coaching staff. Arians called Mitchell "a super football coach and a great person", adding "I think we had more quarterback sacks this year in our third game than we had all last year." At Temple, Mitchell coached Ralph Jarvis whom the Chicago Bears chose in the third round of the 1988 NFL draft.

=== Louisiana State ===
After a single season at Temple, Mitchell returned to the SEC in 1987 at Louisiana State University (LSU) where he served as outside linebackers coach under Mike Archer. After two seasons coaching linebackers Mitchell was promoted to defensive coordinator in early 1990 succeeding Pete Jenkins and becoming the first African-American to serve in that capacity in the SEC.

Mitchell resigned his position at LSU in March 1990 due to improper accounting of some hotel expenses over the previous two years. He was reinstated two months later following an investigation and repayment of the disputed funds.

With Mitchell leading the defense, the Tigers finished a disappointing 5–6 in 1990 (including 2–5 in the SEC) leading to the firing of head coach Archer following the season. Mitchell was offered a chance to return to his post coaching outside linebackers by Archer's replacement, Curley Hallman, with whom Mitchell had coached at Alabama. However, Mitchell chose to leave LSU a couple of months later to return to the professional ranks.

=== NFL ===
==== Cleveland Browns ====
After leaving LSU, Mitchell was hired as defensive line coach of the Cleveland Browns of the National Football League (NFL) in 1991. He coached for the Browns under head coach Bill Belichick for three seasons, helping to develop Michael Dean Perry (who twice made the Pro Bowl in Mitchell's three seasons with the team) and Rob Burnett (who made his only Pro Bowl in Mitchell's final year with the club).

==== Pittsburgh Steelers ====
"Every player he gets, he makes better. I don't know of a stronger testimony for a coach. Everybody he touches, he makes better."

— Steelers defensive coordinator, Dick LeBeau on Mitchell's contribution as a coach

In 1994, he moved on to become the defensive line coach of the Pittsburgh Steelers under Bill Cowher, replacing Steve Furness. He's been with the Steelers ever since, making him the club's longest tenured coach, and one of the longest serving coaches with his current team in the NFL. With the arrival of Mike Tomlin in 2007, Mitchell replaced Russ Grimm as the team's assistant head coach while retaining his responsibilities in coaching the defensive line.

The Steelers led the league in stopping the run four times in the first fifteen years of Mitchell's tenure (through 2008). Steelers defensive linemen have participated in the Pro Bowl eight times since Mitchell's arrival: Casey Hampton (five Pro Bowls), Aaron Smith (once), Brett Keisel (once) and Joel Steed (once). The team as a whole has also had tremendous success during Mitchell's tenure, making the playoff eleven times and reaching the AFC Championship Game eight times in his first 18 years. They've also made it to four Super Bowls, winning the championship in 2005 and again in 2008.

In Super Bowl XL in February 2006, the Steelers faced a tough test in slowing Seattle Seahawks All-Pro running back Shaun Alexander who ran for 1,880 yards and scored an NFL record 28 touchdowns in the regular season behind an offensive line that featured All-Pro linemen Walter Jones and Steve Hutchinson on the left side. The defensive line would need to slow down the Seahawks running attack to keep the Steelers in the game, a challenge which Mitchell took personally. The players came through holding Alexander under the 100-yard plateau and most importantly preventing him from scoring, which was crucial to a Steelers win. After the game, Mitchell said of the strategy, "Our thing was 'keep him out of the end zone.' We didn't care if he got 300 yards; don't let him in the end zone."

In Super Bowl XLIII in 2009, they again faced a formidable offense in the Arizona Cardinals. The defensive line once again came through with a great performance, holding the Cardinals to just 33 yards on the ground.

Mitchell coaches in a quiet and cerebral style which he picked up from the first head coach under who he worked, saying with typical understatement, "Coach Bryant wasn't a screamer, and I noticed he had some success." He has further described his approach to coaching thusly:

I care for my players. They're not only good football players, they're good people. With my guys I don't have to yell. I don't use profanity with them. They're men, and that's how I treat them. I respect them, they respect me.

This style and the results it has brought have earned Mitchell the respect of his peers in the NFL. Clarence Brooks coaches defensive linemen for the Steeler division rival the Baltimore Ravens and thus meets the Steelers at least twice a year. Brooks assessed his counterpart saying,

When I wonder how good a coach a guy is, I watch his players, watch how they play, watch how they respond to adversity, watch what they do, watch how they play techniquewise. And forever his guys are always sound techniquewise, always play very hard, look like they're disciplined in drills.

Mitchell is held in extremely high regard by his fellow Steelers coaches as well. Steelers defensive coordinator Dick LeBeau has said he's "always had great confidence in him". Head coach Mike Tomlin has called Mitchell a "trailblazer" and described him as "a very respected coach in this league and well respected in this organization".

Mitchell retired from coaching following the 2022 season, after 28 years with the Steelers.

=== Personal life ===
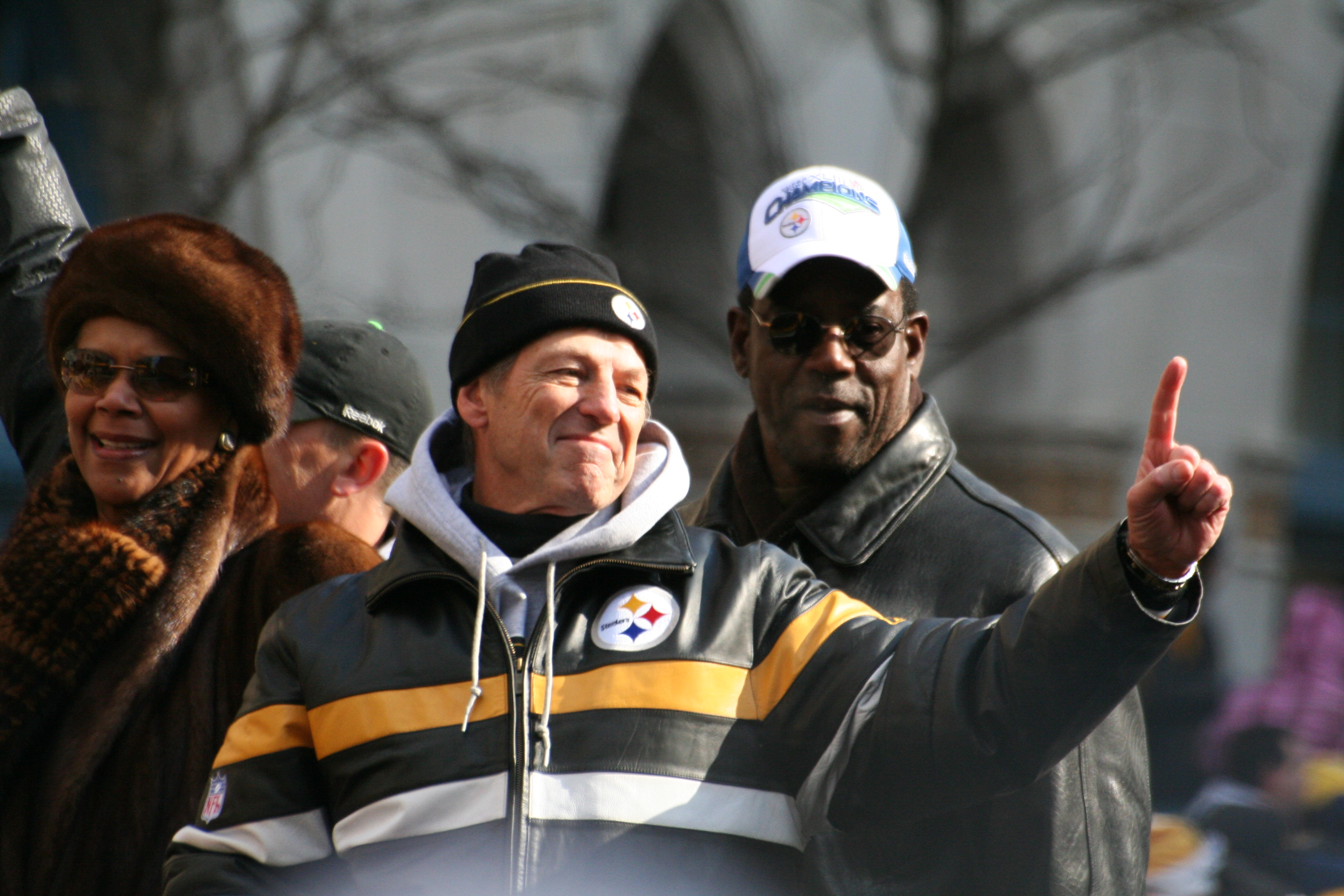
Joyce and John Mitchell flanking Dick Lebeau.

Mitchell lives with his wife, Joyce, in Pittsburgh, Pennsylvania; the couple have no children. Mitchell had expressed interest in becoming the head football coach at Alabama when that position had been open in the past. However, despite this interest and his connection with the program he has never been pursued for the position.

Away from football, Mitchell's avocations include collecting art, fine wine and vintage jazz as well as studying history. He has stated that he plans to retire around 2012 to 2013, at which time he will return to Birmingham, Alabama. He was elected to the Alabama Sports Hall of Fame with the class of 2009. Mitchell said of his selection: "I'm from the state of Alabama, and this is big. The state of Alabama is putting me, John Mitchell, a black kid from Mobile, in their sports hall of fame. There's nothing bigger in my life."
