= 2019 Grambling State Tigers football team =

American college football season

2019 Grambling State Tigers football
- Conference: Southwestern Athletic Conference
- West Division
- Record: 6–5 (4–3 SWAC)
- Head coach: Broderick Fobbs (6th season)
- Offensive coordinator: Mark Orlando (1st season)
- Defensive coordinator: Everett Todd (6th season)
- Home stadium: Eddie Robinson Stadium

2019 Southwestern Athletic Conference football standings
	Conf.			Overall
Team	W		L	W		L
East Division
Alcorn State x$	6	–	1	9	–	4
Alabama A&M	4	–	3	7	–	5
Alabama State	4	–	3	5	–	6
Jackson State	3	–	4	4	–	8
Mississippi Valley State	1	–	6	2	–	9
West Division
Southern x	6	–	1	8	–	5
Prairie View A&M	4	–	3	6	–	5
Grambling State	4	–	3	6	–	5
Arkansas–Pine Bluff	3	–	4	6	–	5
Texas Southern	0	–	7	0	–	11
Championship: Alcorn State 39, Southern 24
$ – Conference champion; x – Division champion/co-champions

The 2019 Grambling State Tigers football team represented Grambling State University in the 2019 NCAA Division I FCS football season. The Tigers were led by sixth-year head coach Broderick Fobbs and played their home games at Eddie Robinson Stadium in Grambling, Louisiana as members of the West Division of the Southwestern Athletic Conference (SWAC).

== Preseason ==
=== Recruiting class ===
College recruiting information
Name	Hometown	School	Height	Weight	40^{‡}	Commit date
Kash Foley; Wide Receiver	LaPlace, LA	Riverside HS	6 ft 0 in (1.83 m)	180 lb (82 kg)	-	Dec 18, 2019
Kash Foley; Wide Receiver	Recruit ratings: Scout: Rivals: 247Sports: ESPN:					
Jordan Ighofose; Offensive Line	Detroit, MI	Martin Luther King HS; Northeast Oklahoma CC	6 ft 3 in (1.91 m)	315 lb (143 kg)	-	Dec 18, 2019
Jordan Ighofose; Offensive Line	Recruit ratings: Scout: Rivals: 247Sports: ESPN:					
Kyle Sullivan–Jones; Offensive Line	Los Angeles, CA	Cathedral HS	6 ft 2 in (1.88 m)	275 lb (125 kg)	-	Dec 18, 2019
Kyle Sullivan–Jones; Offensive Line	Recruit ratings: Scout: Rivals: 247Sports: ESPN:					
Jaye Patrick; Tight End	Detroit, MI	Western International HS; College of the Desert	6 ft 6 in (1.98 m)	245 lb (111 kg)	-	Dec 18, 2019
Jaye Patrick; Tight End	Recruit ratings: Scout: Rivals: 247Sports: ESPN:					
Toddrick Paul; Defensive End	Jeanerette, LA	Jeanerette HS	6 ft 4 in (1.93 m)	235 lb (107 kg)	-	Dec 18, 2019
Toddrick Paul; Defensive End	Recruit ratings: Scout: Rivals: 247Sports: ESPN:					
CJ Russell; Running Back	Arcadia, LA	Arcadia HS	6 ft 0 in (1.83 m)	185 lb (84 kg)	-	Dec 18, 2019
CJ Russell; Running Back	Recruit ratings: Scout: Rivals: 247Sports: ESPN:					
William Savala; Defensive Back	Dallas, TX	Dallas Carter HS	6 ft 1 in (1.85 m)	190 lb (86 kg)	-	Dec 18, 2019
William Savala; Defensive Back	Recruit ratings: Scout: Rivals: 247Sports: ESPN:					
Marquez Tatum; Defensive End	Mobile, AL	LeFlore HS	6 ft 4 in (1.93 m)	265 lb (120 kg)	-	Dec 18, 2019
Marquez Tatum; Defensive End	Recruit ratings: Scout: Rivals: 247Sports: ESPN:					
Kyree Wade–McLeod; Offensive Line	Philadelphia, PA	Delaware Valley Charter; ASA CC	6 ft 4 in (1.93 m)	315 lb (143 kg)	-	Dec 18, 2019
Kyree Wade–McLeod; Offensive Line	Recruit ratings: Scout: Rivals: 247Sports: ESPN:					
Calvin Watson Jr. Defensive Back	Walker, LA	Walker HS	5 ft 11 in (1.80 m)	180 lb (82 kg)	-	Dec 18, 2019
Calvin Watson Jr. Defensive Back	Recruit ratings: Scout: Rivals: 247Sports: ESPN:					
Damon Wilson; Linebacker	Shreveport, LA	Woodlawn HS	6 ft 0 in (1.83 m)	225 lb (102 kg)	-	Dec 18, 2019
Damon Wilson; Linebacker	Recruit ratings: Scout: Rivals: 247Sports: ESPN:					

=== Preseason polls ===
The SWAC released their preseason poll on July 16, 2019. The Tigers were picked to finish in third place in the West Division.

=== Preseason all–SWAC teams ===
The Tigers placed four players on the preseason all–SWAC teams.

Offense

2nd team

William Waddell – OL

Defense

1st team

Anferenee Mullins – DL

Joseph McWilliams – DB

2nd team

Daquarian Williams – DB

== Schedule ==
Date	Time	Opponent	Site	TV	Result	Attendance
August 31	7:00 p.m.	at Louisiana–Monroe*	Malone Stadium; Monroe, LA	ESPN3	L 9–31	28,327
September 7	2:30 p.m.	at Louisiana Tech*	Joe Aillet Stadium; Ruston, LA	NFLN	L 14–20	23,174
September 21	5:00 p.m.	at Alabama State	New ASU Stadium; Montgomery, AL	ASU All Access	L 20–23	17,309
September 28	4:00 p.m.	vs. Prairie View A&M	Cotton Bowl; Dallas, TX (State Fair Classic)		L 36–42	52,315
October 5	6:00 p.m.	at Jackson State*	Mississippi Veterans Memorial Stadium; Jackson, MS	ESPN3	W 44–21	32,265
October 12	2:00 p.m.	Alabama A&M*	Eddie Robinson Stadium; Grambling, LA		W 23–10	9,072
October 26	1:00 p.m.	at Arkansas–Pine Bluff	Simmons Bank Field; Pine Bluff, AR	Golden Lions All-Access	W 39–33	7,513
November 2	2:00 p.m.	Texas Southern^{†}	Eddie Robinson Stadium; Grambling, LA	YouTube	W 55–20	14,562
November 9	2:00 p.m.	Alcorn State	Eddie Robinson Stadium; Grambling, LA	ESPN3	W 19–16 ^{OT}	7,554
November 16	1:00 p.m.	at Mississippi Valley State	Rice–Totten Stadium; Itta Bena, MS	YouTube	W 40–0	1,978
November 30	4:00 p.m.	vs. Southern	Mercedes-Benz Superdome; New Orleans, LA (Bayou Classic)	NBCSN	L 28–30	68,314
*Non-conference game; ^{†}Homecoming; Rankings from STATS Poll released prior to the game; All times are in Central time

== Game summaries ==
=== At Louisiana–Monroe ===
Grambling State at Louisiana–Monroe – Game summary

Quarter	1	2	3	4	Total
Tigers	6	3	0	0	9
Warhawks	7	10	7	7	31

at JPS Field at Malone Stadium, Monroe, LA

- Date: August 31
- Game time: 7:00 p.m. CDT
- Game weather: 93 °F (34 °C); clear
- Game attendance: 28,327
- Referee: Marshall Lewis
- TV: ESPN3

Game information

First quarter

- (05:42) ULM TD – Josh Johnson 51-yard rush, Jacob Meeks kick
  Louisiana–Monroe 7–0; Drive: 1 play, 46 yards, 0:11
- (00:31) GRAM TD – Lyndon Rash 15-yard pass from Geremy Hickbottom, Garrett Urban PAT failed
  Louisiana–Monroe 7–6; Drive: 12 plays, 76 yards, 5:11

Second quarter

- (12:50) ULM TD – Xavier Brown 16-yard pass from Caleb Evans, Jacob Meeks kick
  Louisiana–Monroe 14–6; Drive: 6 plays, 67 yards, 2:41
- (01:16) ULM FG – Jacob Meeks 40-yard field goal
  Louisiana–Monroe 17–6; Drive: 9 plays, 40 yards, 4:14
- (00:07) GRAM FG – Garrett Urban 41-yard field goal
  Louisiana–Monroe 17–9; Drive: 8 plays, 46 yards, 1:09

Third quarter

- (11:59) ULM TD – Austin Vaughn 1-yard rush, Jacob Meeks kick
  Louisiana–Monroe 24–9; Drive: 7 plays, 76 yards, 3:01

Fourth quarter

- (14:52) ULM TD – Josh Johnson 37-yard rush, Jacob Meeks kick
  Louisiana–Monroe 31–9; Drive: 6 plays, 97 yards, 2:08

Top passers

- ULM – Caleb Evans – 19/25, 183 yards, TD, INT
- GRAM – Geremy Hickbottom – 18/31, 157 yards, TD

Top rushers

- ULM – Josh Johnson – 10 carries, 173 yards, 2 TD
- GRAM – Keilon Elder – 6 carries, 82 yards

Top receivers

- ULM – Xavier Brown – 6 receptions, 68 yards, TD
- GRAM – Devante Davis – 5 receptions, 44 yards

Statistics	Grambling State	Louisiana–Monroe
First downs	21	24
Total yards	407	501
Rushing yards	243	315
Passing yards	164	186
Turnovers	1	1
Time of possession	29:36	30:24

=== At Louisiana Tech ===
Grambling State at Louisiana Tech – Game summary

Quarter	1	2	3	4	Total
Tigers	0	0	7	7	14
Bulldogs	7	13	0	0	20

at Joe Aillet Stadium, Ruston, LA

- Date: September 7
- Game time: 2:30 p.m. CDT
- Game weather: 98 °F (37 °C); sunny
- Game attendance: 23,174
- Referee: Kevin Randall
- TV: NFL Network

Game information

First quarter

- (01:34) LT TD – Justin Henderson 7-yard rush, Bailey Hale kick
  Louisiana Tech 7–0; Drive: 9 plays, 80 yards, 4:09

Second quarter

- (10:13) LT FG – Bailey Hale 33-yard field goal
  Louisiana Tech 10–0; Drive: 11 plays, 45 yards, 4:57
- (04:38) LT TD – Griffin Hebert 40-yard pass from J'Mar Smith, Bailey Hale kick
  Louisiana Tech 17–0; Drive: 5 plays, 69 yards, 2:04
- (02:16) LT FG – Bailey Hale 48-yard field goal
  Louisiana Tech 20–0; Drive: 4 plays, 2 yards, 0:51

Third quarter

- (07:01) GRAM TD – Raylon Richardson 23-yard pass from Geremy Hickbottom, Garrett Urban kick
  Louisiana Tech 20–7; Drive: 12 plays, 93 yards, 3:52

Fourth quarter

- (03:23) GRAM TD – Jakarie Nichols 2-yard rush, Garrett Urban kick
  Louisiana Tech 20–14; Drive: 9 plays, 72 yards, 2:39

Top passers

- LT – J'Mar Smith – 17/25, 220 yards, TD
- GRAM – Geremy Hickbottom – 26/40, 239 yards, TD

Top rushers

- LT – Israel Tucker – 16 carries, 71 yards
- GRAM – Damien Crumitie – 16 carries, 68 yards

Top receivers

- LT – Griffin Hebert – 3 receptions, 68 yards, TD
- GRAM – Raylon Richardson – 4 receptions, 63 yards, TD

Statistics	Grambling State	Louisiana Tech
First downs	32	20
Total yards	455	390
Rushing yards	216	170
Passing yards	239	220
Turnovers	1	0
Time of possession	30:45	29:15

=== At Alabama State ===
Grambling State at Alabama State – Game summary

Quarter	1	2	3	4	Total
Tigers	7	3	10	0	20
Hornets	3	7	7	6	23

at New ASU Stadium, Montgomery, AL

- Date: September 21
- Game time: 5:00 p.m. CDT
- Game weather: 92 °F (33 °C); clear
- Game attendance: 17,309
- Referee: V. Breakfield

Game information

First quarter

- (07:22) ALST FG – Hunter Hanson 32-yard field goal
  Alabama State 3–0; Drive: 4 plays, 5 yards, 1:10
- (00:41) GRAM TD – Keilon Elder 6-yard rush, Garrett Urban kick
  Grambling State 7–3; Drive: 9 plays, 45 yards, 3:13

Second quarter

- (05:44) ALST TD – Jacory Merritt 4-yard rush, Hunter Hanson kick
  Alabama State 10–7; Drive: 9 plays, 70 yards, 4:21
- (01:33) GRAM FG – Garrett Urban 21-yard field goal
  Tied 10–10; Drive: 10 plays, 74 yards, 4:11

Third quarter

- (10:49) GRAM FG – Garrett Urban 21-yard field goal
  Grambling State 13–10; Drive: 6 plays, 65 yards, 2:11
- (09:32) ALST TD – Jeremiah Hixon 23-yard pass from KHA'Darris Davis kick
  Alabama State 17–13; Drive: 3 plays, 65 yards, 1:17
- (00:00) GRAM TD – Lyndon Rash 15-yard pass from Geremy Hickbottom, Garrett Urban kick
  Grambling State 20–17; Drive: 10 plays, 78 yards, 2:56

Fourth quarter

- (09:55) ALST TD – KHA'Darris Davis 1-yard rush, Garrett Urban kick
  Alabama State 23–20; Drive: 12 plays, 75 yards, 5:05

Top passers

- GRAM – Geremy Hickbottom – 19/30, 184 yards, TD, INT
- ALST – KHA'Darris Davis – 19/31, 224 yards, TD, INT

Top rushers

- GRAM – Jakarie Nichols – 11 carries, 91 yards
- ALST – Ezra Gray – 14 carries, 41 yards

Top receivers

- GRAM – Lyndon Rash – 5 receptions, 55 yards, TD
- ALST – Michael Jefferson – 8 receptions, 81 yards

Statistics	Grambling State	Alabama State
First downs	24	18
Total yards	425	301
Rushing yards	241	77
Passing yards	184	224
Turnovers	2	1
Time of possession	28:33	31:27

=== Vs. Prairie View A&M ===
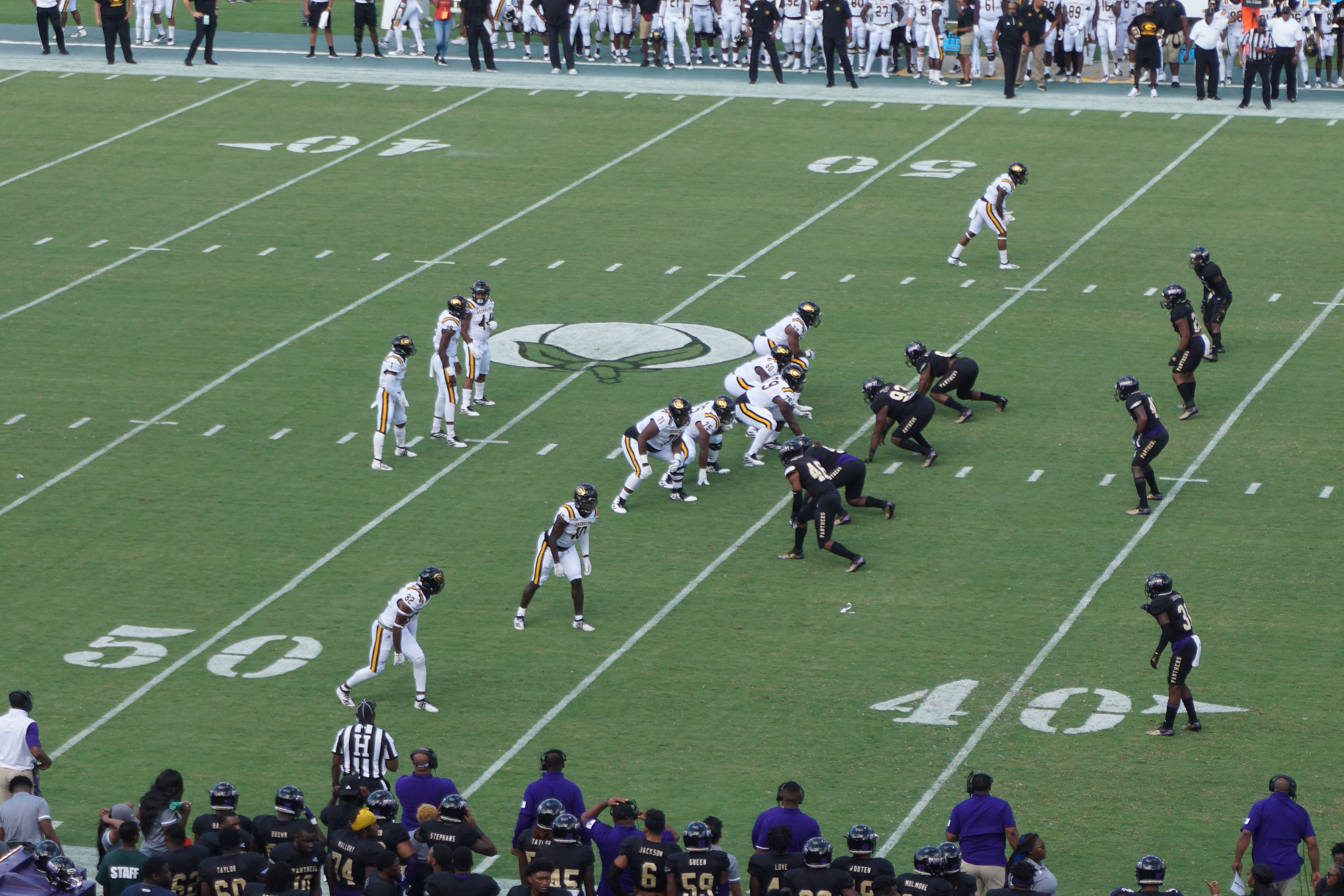
Grambling in action against Prairie View

Prairie View A&M vs. Grambling State – Game summary

Quarter	1	2	3	4	Total
Panthers	14	17	0	11	42
Tigers	17	6	0	13	36

at Cotton Bowl, Dallas, TX

- Date: September 21
- Game time: 4:00 p.m. CDT
- Game weather: 90 °F (32 °C); partly cloudy
- Game attendance: 52,315

Game information

First quarter

- (12:38) GRAM TD – Quintin Guice 14-yard pass from Geremy Hickbottom, Miguel Mendez kick
  Grambling State 7–0; Drive: 5 plays, 55 yards, 2:22
- (08:48) PVAMU TD – Dawonya Tucker 60-yard rush, Amaury Martinez kick
  Tied 7–7; Drive: 3 plays, 69 yards, 1:05
- (04:22) GRAM FG – Miguel Mendez 24-yard field goal
  Grambling State 10–7; Drive: 14 plays, 70 yards, 4:22
- (02:10) GRAM TD – Katrelle Starks 10-yard rush, Miguel Mendez kick
  Grambling State 17–7; Drive: 6 plays, 41 yards, 1:54
- (00:14) PVAMU TD – Dawonya Tucker 13-yard rush, Miguel Mendez kick
  Grambling State 17–14; Drive: 6 plays, 75 yards, 1:56

Second quarter

- (08:11) PVAMU FG – Amaury Martinez 27-yard field goal
  Tied 17–17; Drive: 9 plays, 66 yards, 2:03
- (05:36) GRAM TD – Joseph McWilliams 42-yard interception returned, Miguel Mendez PAT failed
  Grambling State 23–17; Drive: 4 plays, 11 yards, 1:38
- (03:18) PVAMU TD – Jalen Morton 3-yard rush, Amaury Martinez kick
  Prairie View A&M 24–23; Drive: 6 plays, 75 yards, 2:18
- (01:40) PVAMU TD – Chris Johnson 20-yard pass from Jalen Morton, Amaury Martinez kick
  Prairie View A&M 31–23; Drive: 3 plays, 56 yards, 0:59

Fourth quarter

- (08:32) PVAMU TD – Jalen Morton 1-yard rush, Jalen Morton two-point conversion pass to Dejohn Jones
  Prairie View A&M 39–23; Drive: 9 plays, 84 yards, 4:11
- (05:23) PVAMU FG – Amaury Jones 36-yard field goal
  Prairie View A&M 42–23; Drive: 6 plays, 13 yards, 2:33
- (02:34) GRAM TD – Charles Wright 2-yard rush, two-point conversion pass failed
  Prairie View A&M 42–29; Drive: 7 plays, 78 yards, 2:41
- (01:25) GRAM TD – Quincy Mitchell 55-yard return of blocked punt, Miguel Mendez kick
  Prairie View A&M 42–36; Drive: 3 plays, 9 yards, 1:09

Top passers

- PVAMU – Jalen Morton – 16/21, 192 yards, TD, INT
- GRAM – Geremy Hickbottom – 21/37, 158 yards, TD, INT

Top rushers

- PVAMU – Dawonya Tucker – 26 carries, 263 yards, 2 TD
- GRAM – CJ Russell – 7 carries, 38 yards

Top receivers

- PVAMU – Tristen Wallace – 4 receptions, 71 yards
- GRAM – Devante Davis – 2 receptions, 31 yards

Statistics	Prairie View A&M	Grambling State
First downs	28	24
Total yards	607	327
Rushing yards	390	130
Passing yards	217	197
Turnovers	2	2
Time of possession	32:22	27:38

=== At Jackson State ===
Grambling State at Jackson State – Game summary

Quarter	1	2	3	4	Total
GRAM Tigers	0	10	14	20	44
JSU Tigers	0	7	7	7	21

at Mississippi Veterans Memorial Stadium, Jackson, MS

- Date: October 5
- Game time: 6:00 p.m. CDT
- Game weather: 88 °F (31 °C); clear
- Game attendance: 32,265
- Referee: Scott Johnson
- TV: ESPN3

Game information

Second quarter

- (14:53) JSU TD – Jordan Johnson 2-yard rush, Josh Littles kick
  Jackson State 7–0; Drive: 13 plays, 78 yards, 6:20
- (06:41) GRAM FG – Miguez Mendez 27-yard field goal
  Jackson State 7–3; Drive: 15 plays, 67 yards, 4:22
- (00:00) GRAM TD – Devanir Martin 70-yard return of blocked field goal, Miguel Mendez kick
  Grambling State 10–7; Drive: 3 plays, 6 yards, 0:39

Third quarter

- (06:57) GRAM TD – Lyndon Rash 6-yard pass from Geremy Hickbottom, Miguel Mendez kick
  Grambling State 17–7; Drive: 7 plays, 37 yards, 2:40
- (04:52) GRAM TD – Kevin Dominique 59-yard rush, Miguel Mendez kick
  Grambling State 24–7; Drive: 2 plays, 63 yards, 0:29
- (03:09) JSU TD – Ra'Meik Wallace 52-yard pass from Derrick Ponder, Adrian Salazar kick
  Jackson State 24–14; Drive: 4 plays, 65 yards, 1:43

Fourth quarter

- (11:11) GRAM TD – Lyndon Rash 10-yard pass from Geremy Hickbottom, Miguel Mendez kick
  Grambling State 31–14; Drive: 10 plays, 66 yards, 3:57
- (09:48) GRAM TD – Joseph McWilliams 56-yard interception returned, Miguel Mendez PAT failed
  Grambling State 37–14; Drive: 4 plays, 27 yards, 1:23
- (08:16) GRAM TD – Kevin Dominique 31-yard rush, Miguel Mendez kick
  Grambling State 44–14; Drive: 3 plays, 39 yards, 0:39
- (03:58) JSU TD – Warren Newman 10-yard pass from Derrick Ponder, Adrian Salazar kick
  Grambling State 44–21; Drive: 13 plays, 75 yards, 4:18

Top passers

- GRAM – Geremy Hickbottom – 14/22, 97 yards, 2 TD, INT
- JSU – Derrick Ponder – 13/24, 158 yards, 2 TD, INT

Top rushers

- GRAM – Kevin Dominique – 10 carries, 129 yards, 2 TD
- JSU – Jalon Jones – 14 carries, 65 yards

Top receivers

- GRAM – Lyndon Rash – 4 receptions, 39 yards, 2 TD
- JSU – Warren Newman – 8 receptions, 55 yards, TD

Statistics	Grambling State	Jackson State
First downs	16	18
Total yards	422	310
Rushing yards	325	124
Passing yards	97	186
Turnovers	2	1
Time of possession	27:24	32:36

=== Alabama A&M ===
Alabama A&M at Grambling State – Game summary

Quarter	1	2	3	4	Total
Bulldogs	0	0	10	0	10
Tigers	0	7	3	13	23

at Eddie Robinson Stadium, Grambling, LA

- Date: October 12
- Game time: 2:00 p.m. CDT
- Game weather: 63 °F (17 °C); clear
- Game attendance: 9,072
- Referee: Tony Ross

Game information

Second quarter

- (01:37) GRAM TD – Keilon Elder 1-yard rush, Miguel Mendez kick
  Grambling State 7–0; Drive: 7 plays, 55 yards, 2:29

Third quarter

- (11:17) GRAM FG – Miguel Mendez 40-yard field goal
  Grambling State 10–0; Drive: 10 plays, 41 yards, 3:43
- (10:00) AAMU TD – Abdul–Fatai Ibrahim 69-yard pass from Aqeel Glass, Spencer Corey kick
  Grambling State 10–7; Drive: 3 plays, 70 yards, 1:17
- (00:06) AAMU FG – Spencer Corey 37-yard field goal
  Tied 10–10; Drive: 4 plays, 9 yards, 1:17

Fourth quarter

- (02:11) GRAM TD – Jakarie Nichols 4-yard rush, Miguel Mendez kick
  Grambling State 17–10; Drive: 9 plays, 27 yards, 3:18
- (00:52) GRAM TD – Koby Foster 46-yard fumble returned, Miguel Mendez kick
  Grambling State 23–10; Drive: 0 plays, 0 yards, 0:00

Top passers

- AAMU – Aqeel Glass – 19/41, 225 yards, TD, INT
- GRAM – Charles Wright – 13/19, 98 yards

Top rushers

- AAMU – Jordan Bentley – 19 carries, 76 yards
- GRAM – Keilon Elder – 9 carries, 74 yards, TD

Top receivers

- AAMU – Abdul–Fatai Ibrahim – 4 receptions, 87 yards, TD
- GRAM – Lyndon Rash – 3 receptions, 44 yards

Statistics	Alabama A&M	Grambling State
First downs	12	20
Total yards	273	358
Rushing yards	48	230
Passing yards	225	128
Turnovers	4	3
Time of possession	29:41	30:19

=== At Arkansas–Pine Bluff ===
Grambling State at Arkansas–Pine Bluff – Game summary

Quarter	1	2	3	4	Total
Tigers	9	13	7	10	39
Golden Lions	12	7	7	7	33

at Simmons Bank Field, Pine Bluff, AR

- Date: October 26
- Game time: 1:00 p.m. CDT
- Game weather: 52 °F (11 °C); cloudy
- Game attendance: 7,513
- Referee: Tony Ross

Game information

First quarter

- (08:16) GRAM TD – Jakarie Nichols 4-yard rush, Miguel Mendez kick
  Grambling State 7–0; Drive: 3 plays, 30 yards, 0:32
- (04:26) UAPB TD – DeJuan Miller 17-yard pass from Shannon Patrick, Zack Piwniczka PAT blocked
  Grambling State 7–6; Drive: 7 plays, 75 yards, 3:50
- (02:52) GRAM SF – Team Safety
  Grambling State 9–6; Drive: 1 play, -2 yards, 0:07
- (01:42) UAPB TD – Taeyler Porter 1-yard rush, Zack Piwniczka kick
  Arkansas–Pine Bluff 12–9; Drive: 4 plays, 57 yards, 0:49

Second quarter

- (11:52) GRAM TD – Geremy Hickbottom 14-yard rush, two-point conversion rush attempt failed
  Grambling State 15–12; Drive: 13 plays, 75 yards, 4:46
- (08:38) GRAM TD – Lyndon Rash 31-yard pass from Geremy Hickbottom, Miguel Mendez kick
  Grambling State 22–12; Drive: 5 plays, 45 yards, 1:38
- (02:01) UAPB TD – DeJuan Miller 24-yard pass from Shannon Patrick, Zack Piwniczka kick
  Grambling State 22–19; Drive: 6 plays, 57 yards, 2:30

Third quarter

- (08:19) UAPB TD – Harry Ballard III 5-yard pass from Shannon Patrick, Zack Piwniczka kick
  Arkansas–Pine Bluff 26–22; Drive: 15 plays, 69 yards, 6:35
- (05:08) GRAM TD – Kevin Dominique 40-yard pass from Geremy Hickbottom, Miguel Mendez kick
  Grambling State 29–26; Drive: 7 plays, 66 yards, 3:11

Fourth quarter

- (12:11) GRAM FG – Miguel Mendez 34-yard field goal
  Grambling State 32–26; Drive: 10 plays, 39 yards, 2:52
- (07:57) GRAM TD – Joseph McWilliams 0-yard interception returned, Miguel Mendez kick
  Grambling State 39–26; Drive: 2 plays, 4 yards, 0:48
- (04:03) UAPB TD – Harry Ballard III 24-yard pass from Shannon Patrick, Zack Piwniczka kick
  Grambling State 39–33; Drive: 10 plays, 65 yards, 3:46

Top passers

- GRAM – Geremy Hickbottom – 19/33, 248 yards, 2 TD, INT
- UAPB – Shannon Patrick – 22/35, 291 yards, 4 TD, 3 INT

Top rushers

- GRAM – Geremy Hickbottom – 14 carries, 21 yards, TD
- UAPB – Taeyler Porter – 28 carries, 79 yards, TD

Top receivers

- GRAM – Lyndon Rash – 3 receptions, 74 yards, TD
- UAPB – Harry Ballard III – 9 receptions, 144 yards, 2 TD

Statistics	Grambling State	Arkansas–Pine Bluff
First downs	17	20
Total yards	292	439
Rushing yards	44	148
Passing yards	248	291
Turnovers	2	3
Time of possession	25:09	34:51

=== Texas Southern ===
Texas Southern at Grambling State – Game summary

Quarter	1	2	3	4	Total
TSU Tigers	0	14	6	0	20
GRAM Tigers	21	20	0	14	55

at Eddie Robinson Stadium, Grambling, LA

- Date: November 2
- Game time: 2:00 p.m. CDT
- Game weather: 61 °F (16 °C); cold and windy
- Game attendance: 14,562

Game information

First quarter

- (13:51) GRAM TD – Geremy Hickbottom 73-yard rush, Miguel Mendez kick
  Grambling State 7–0; Drive: 3 plays, 80 yards, 1:19
- (09:23) GRAM TD – Lyndon Rash 38-yard pass from Geremy Hickbottom, Miguel Mendez kick
  Grambling State 14–0; Drive: 6 plays, 67 yards, 2:14
- (04:36) GRAM TD – Geremy Hickbottom 67-yard rush, Miguel Mendez kick
  Grambling State 21–0; Drive: 3 plays, 62 yards, 0:46

Second quarter

- (14:19) GRAM TD – Nicholas Hunter 10-yard pass from Geremy Hickbottom, Miguel Mendez kick
  Grambling State 28–0; Drive: 3 plays, 65 yards, 1:01
- (12:27) TXSO TD – Donnie Corley 35-yard pass from De'Andre Johnson, Brady Obholtz PAT failed
  Grambling State 28–6; Drive: 2 plays, 47 yards, 0:31
- (08:45) GRAM TD – Geremy Hickbottom 1-yard rush, Miguel Mendez PAT blocked
  Grambling State 34–6; Drive: 9 plays, 49 yards, 3:31
- (06:20) GRAM TD – Keilon Elder 5-yard rush, Miguel Mendez kick
  Grambling State 41–6; Drive: 4 plays, 55 yards, 1:20
- (02:30) TXSO TD – De'Andre Johnson 7-yard rush, De'Andre Johnson two-point conversion pass from Thurman Morbley
  Grambling State 41–14; Drive: 13 plays, 85 yards, 3:44

Third quarter

- (11:36) TXSO TD – Tylor Cook 7-yard rush, two-point conversion pass attempt good kick
  Grambling State 41–20; Drive: 10 plays, 75 yards, 4:58

Fourth quarter

- (12:43) GRAM TD – Anfernee Mullins 51-yard interception returned, Miguel Mendez kick
  Grambling State 48–20; Drive: 9 plays, 45 yards, 2:51
- (09:58) GRAM TD – Kevin Dominique 2-yard rush, Miguel Mendez kick
  Grambling State 55–20; Drive: 7 plays, 35 yards, 2:36

Top passers

- TXSO – De'Andre Johnson – 21/40, 351 yards, TD, 2 INT
- GRAM – Geremy Hickbottom – 16/23, 268 yards, 2 TD

Top rushers

- TXSO – De'Andre Johnson – 21 carries, 133 yards, TD
- GRAM – Geremy Hickbottom – 15 carries, 185 yards, 3 TD

Top receivers

- TXSO – Donnie Corley – 11 receptions, 170 yards, TD
- GRAM – Devante Davis – 4 receptions, 80 yards

Statistics	Texas Southern	Grambling State
First downs	34	22
Total yards	637	597
Rushing yards	280	307
Passing yards	357	290
Turnovers	6	0
Time of possession	37:09	22:51

=== Alcorn State ===
Alcorn State at Grambling State – Game summary

Quarter	1	2	3	4	OT	Total
Braves	0	10	6	0	0	16
Tigers	0	10	0	6	3	19

at Eddie Robinson Stadium, Grambling, LA

- Date: November 9
- Game time: 2:00 p.m. CDT
- Game weather: 55 °F (13 °C); sunny
- Game attendance: 7,554
- Referee: Jesse Harris
- TV: ESPN3

Game information

Second quarter

- (14:55) ALCN FG – Corey McCullough 20-yard field goal
  Alcorn State 3–0; Drive: 10 plays, 70 yards, 3:55
- (11:39) GRAM FG – Miguel Mendez 32-yard field goal
  Tied 3–3; Drive: 9 plays, 47 yards, 3:11
- (07:57) GRAM TD – Dequarius Thomas 11-yard pass from Geremy Hickbottom, Miguel Mendez kick
  Grambling State 10–3; Drive: 5 plays, 34 yards, 2:13
- (02:10) ALCN TD – Raidarious Anderson 19-yard pass from Felix Harper, Corey McCullough kick
  Tied 10–10; Drive: 7 plays, 75 yards, 1:58

Third quarter

- (11:44) ALCN FG – Corey McCullough 40-yard field goal
  Alcorn State 13–10; Drive: 4 plays, -6 yards, 0:54
- (01:34) TULN TD – Corey McCullough 41-yard field goal
  Alcorn State 16–10; Drive: 6 plays, 23 yards, 2:35

Fourth quarter

- (01:07) GRAM TD – Kobe' Ross 29-yard pass from Charles Wright, Miguel Mendez PAT failed
  Tied 16–16; Drive: 8 plays, 80 yards, 2:44

First overtime

- GRAM FG – Miguel Mendez 45-yard field goal
  Grambling State 19–16; Drive: 12 plays, 0 yards, 0:14

Top passers

- ALCN – Felix Harper – 24/48, 269 yards, TD, 2 INT
- GRAM – Geremy Hickbottom – 15/23, 157 yards, TD, INT

Top rushers

- ALCN – Niko Duffey – 20 carries, 106 yards
- GRAM – Kevin Dominique – 11 carries, 69 yards

Top receivers

- ALCN – Raidarious Anderson – 6 receptions, 103 yards, TD
- GRAM – Raylon Richardson – 6 receptions, 101 yards

Statistics	Alcorn State	Grambling State
First downs	20	20
Total yards	385	353
Rushing yards	116	133
Passing yards	269	220
Turnovers	2	2
Time of possession	30:34	29:26

=== At Mississippi Valley State ===
Grambling State at Mississippi Valley State – Game summary

Quarter	1	2	3	4	Total
Tigers	14	3	10	13	40
Delta Devils	0	0	0	0	0

at Rice–Totten Stadium, Itta Bena, MS

- Date: November 16
- Game time: 1:00 p.m. CDT
- Game attendance: 1,978
- Referee: Joe Harris

Game information

First quarter

- (10:55) GRAM TD – Devante Davis 27-yard pass from Charles Wright, Miguel Mendez kick
  Grambling State 7–0; Drive: 12 plays, 72 yards, 3:58
- (01:01) GRAM TD – Dequarius Thomas 25-yard pass from Charles Wright, Miguel Mendez kick
  Grambling State 14–0; Drive: 3 plays, 58 yards, 0:56

Second quarter

- (00:00) GRAM FG – Miguel Mendez 20-yard field goal
  Grambling State 17–0; Drive: 9 plays, 33 yards, 3:00

Third quarter

- (11:44) GRAM FG – Miguel Mendez 23-yard field goal
  Grambling State 20–0; Drive: 7 plays, 38 yards, 2:17
- (06:22) GRAM TD – Geremy Hickbottom 5-yard rush, Miguel Mendez kick
  Grambling State 27–0; Drive: 4 plays, 57 yards, 1:49

Fourth quarter

- (10:06) GRAM TD – Kevin Dominique 23-yard rush, Miguel Mendez kick
  Grambling State 34–0; Drive: 7 plays, 60 yards, 2:23
- (04:30) GRAM TD – Keilon Elder 34-yard rush, Miguel Mendez PAT failed
  Grambling State 40–0; Drive: 7 plays, 73 yards, 3:38

Top passers

- GRAM – Charles Wright – 14/24, 132 yards, 2 TD
- MVSU – Roger Totten II – 4/12, 18 yards, INT

Top rushers

- GRAM – Kevin Dominique – 18 carries, 128 yards, TD
- MVSU – Caleb Johnson – 3 carries, 28 yards

Top receivers

- GRAM – Devante Davis – 6 receptions, 87 yards, TD
- MVSU – Malik Myers – 4 receptions, 22 yards

Statistics	Grambling State	Mississippi Valley State
First downs	22	9
Total yards	521	134
Rushing yards	256	96
Passing yards	265	38
Turnovers	2	4
Time of possession	33:41	26:19

=== Vs. Southern ===
Southern vs. Grambling State – Game summary

Quarter	1	2	3	4	Total
Jaguars	3	14	7	6	30
Tigers	7	14	0	7	28

at Mercedes-Benz Superdome, New Orleans, LA

- Date: November 30
- Game time: 4:00 p.m. CDT
- Game weather: 79 °F (26 °C); mostly cloudy, strong winds
- Game attendance: 68,314
- Referee: Tony Ross
- TV: NBC Sports Network

Game information

First quarter

- (10:34) GRAM TD – Devante Davis 13-yard pass from Geremy Hickbottom, Miguel Mendez kick
  Grambling State 7–0; Drive: 8 plays, 42 yards, 3:17
- (02:52) SOU FG – Cesar Barajas 19-yard field goal
  Grambling State 7–3; Drive: 10 plays, 64 yards, 4:45

Second quarter

- (09:30) GRAM TD – CJ Russell 27-yard rush, Miguel Mendez kick
  Grambling State 14–3; Drive: 5 plays, 63 yards, 1:35
- (08:45) GRAM TD – Keilon Elder 1-yard rush, Miguel Mendez kick
  Grambling State 21–3; Drive: 3 plays, 24 yards, 0:39
- (03:38) SOU TD – Hunter Register 3-yard pass from Ladarius Skelton, Martel Fontenot kick
  Grambling State 21–10; Drive: 12 plays, 75 yards, 5:07
- (00:00) SOU TD – Jarod Sims 1-yard rush, Martel Fontenot kick
  Grambling State 21–17; Drive: 6 plays, 71 yards, 0:50

Third quarter

- (04:40) SOU TD – Hunter Register 5-yard pass from Ladarius Skelton, Martel Fontenot kick
  Southern 24–21; Drive: 13 plays, 77 yards, 5:01

Fourth quarter

- (14:56) GRAM TD – Geremy Hickbottom 3-yard rush, Miguel Mendez kick
  Grambling State 28–24; Drive: 11 plays, 75 yards, 4:40
- (14:11) SOU TD – Jarod Sims 36-yard rush, Martel Fontenot PAT blocked
  Southern 30–28; Drive: 2 plays, 74 yards, 0:39

Top passers

- SOU – Ladarius Skelton – 18/25, 181 yards, 2 TD
- GRAM – Geremy Hickbottom – 15/28, 155 yards, TD

Top rushers

- SOU – Jarod Sims – 7 carries, 89 yards, 2 TD
- GRAM – Keilon Elder – 19 carries, 112 yards, TD

Top receivers

- SOU – Hunter Register – 7 receptions, 75 yards, 2 TD
- GRAM – Lyndon Rash – 4 receptions, 49 yards

Statistics	Southern	Grambling State
First downs	21	20
Total yards	389	364
Rushing yards	208	209
Passing yards	181	155
Turnovers	1	0
Time of possession	30:16	29:44

== Roster ==
2019 Grambling State Tigers football team roster
Players
Coaches
Offense

Pos.	#	Name	Class
WR	1	Donald Johnson III	Fr
QB	2	Aldon Clark	So
QB	3	Charles Wright	Sr
RB	4	Kevin Dominique	So
WR	6	Lyndemian Brooks	Sr
TE	8	Jaye Patrick	So
RB	9	CJ Russell	Fr
WR	10	Lyndon Rash	So
QB	11	John–Paul Pierce	Fr
WR	13	Quintin Guice	Sr
WR	14	Darqueze Brutton	Fr
WR	16	Nicholas Hunter	Fr
WR	17	Darrell Clark	Sr
WR	18	Raylon Richardson	Jr
QB	19	Geremy Hickbottom	Jr
RB	20	Tiger Geeslin	So
RB	23	Keilon Elder	Fr
RB	27	Justin Richard	So
RB	43	Freddie Mango	Fr
RB	44	Jakarie Nichols	So
OL	52	Che' Manning	Sr
OL	60	David Moore	Jr
OL	61	Kyrie Wade–McLeod	Jr
OL	62	Clarence Comeaux	Jr
OL	64	Kyle Jones–Sullivan	Fr
OL	65	Jordan Ighofose	Jr
OL	66	Cameron Davis	Fr
OL	68	Edgard Franklin	So
OL	70	Joseph Garza	So
OL	71	Fred Williams	Sr
OL	72	Juac Angoi	So
OL	73	Carl Wilmer	Sr
OL	74	Kyle Davis	Jr
OL	75	William Waddell	Jr
OL	79	William Jefferson	Sr
TE	80	Dorrell James	Jr
WR	81	Kobe' Ross	Jr
WR	82	DeVante Davis
WR	83	Kash Foley	Fr
TE	84	Joshua Quiett	So
WR	85	Joshua Andrews	Sr
WR	86	DeQuarius Thomas	Sr
TE	87	Casey Warming	Jr
TE	88	Kalif Jackson	GS
WR	89	Zavier Cooper	So

Defense

Pos.	#	Name	Class
DB	4	Damien Crumitie	Jr
DB	5	Quincy Mitchell	Fr
DB	7	Danquarian Fields	Sr
DL	8	Anfernee Mullins	Sr
DL	9	Sundiata Anderson	So
DB	15	Tre'Von Cherry	GS
DB	21	Ryan Fields	Fr
DB	23	Kenan Fontenot	So
DB	24	Diante Bridgewater	Sr
DB	25	Devanir Martin	So
DB	26	Katrelle Starks	Fr
DB	28	Xavier Lodge	Fr
DB	29	Joseph McWilliams	Sr
DB	31	Calvin Watson Jr.	Fr
LB	32	De'Andre Hogues	Sr
LB	34	Jeremy Carter	Sr
DB	35	Chris Grant	Sr
DB	36	William Savala	Fr
DB	37	Javonte Hopkins	Fr
DB	38	Deuntae Youngblood	Jr
LB	39	Treylan Dunn	Jr
LB	40	Brendan Vaughn	So
LB	41	Jakai Thurmond	Fr
LB	42	Marchael Jackson	Sr
LB	45	Najee Gordon	Sr
DB	46	Anthony Boston Jr.	Fr
DL	47	Danrieze Scott	Fr
DB	48	Marquis Britten	So
DB	49	Phillip Lee	So
LB	51	Brandon Wiggs	Sr
LB	53	DeAndre McCarthy	Sr
LB	54	Simeon Nwokenkwo	So
DL	55	Chaz Crawford	Fr
LB	56	Damon Wilson	Fr
LB	57	Lewis Matthews	Fr
LB	58	Matthew Cormier	Fr
LB	59	Donald Freeman	Sr
DL	77	Demontrey Jacobs	So
DL	90	Kendarius Jones	Jr
DL	91	Cameron Richardson	So
DL	92	Wesley Green	So
DL	93	Syemere Roberts	Fr
DL	94	Koby Foster	Jr
DL	95	Jakarie Ceasar	So
DL	96	Toddrick Paul	Fr
DL	97	Marquez Tatum	Fr
DL	98	Cody Dillard	Jr
DL	99	Martavius Dotson	Jr
DB		Devin Brown	Jr
DB		Langdon Golston	Fr
DB		Reggie Shallowhorn	Fr
DB		Terry Walker	Fr
LB		Zach Williams	Fr

Special teams

Pos.	#	Name	Class
K, P	30	Garrett Urban	So
K, P	33	Miguel Mendez	GS
LS	50	Trevor Fleming	Jr

Head coach

- Broderick Fobbs (Grambling State)

Coordinators/assistant coaches

- Mark Orlando (Florida State)
  Offensive coordinator
- Everett Todd (Rice)
  Defensive coordinator, defensive line
- Reginald Nelson (McNeese State)
  Offensive line
- Terrence Graves (Winston-Salem State)
  Assistant coach, linebackers, special teams coordinator
- Kendrick Nord (Grambling State)
  Assistant coach, quarterbacks
- Dre Fusilier (Grambling State)
  Assistant coach, running backs
- Quentin Burrell (Notre Dame)
  Assistant coach, wide receivers
- Brian Ware (Texas Lutheran)
  Assistant coach, safeties
- Andre Fuller (McNeese State)
  Assistant coach, cornerbacks

Legend

- (C) Team captain
- (S) Suspended
- (I) Ineligible
- Injured
- Redshirt

Roster
Last update: April 24, 2020
