= Williamson High School (Alabama) =

Coordinates: 30°40′11″N 88°4′27″W

Location
- 1567 E. Dublin Street; Mobile, Alabama 36605; United States

Information
- Type: Public
- Established: 1916 (110 years ago)
- CEEB code: 011838
- Principal: Kirven Lang
- Teaching staff: 52.00 (FTE)
- Grades: 6–12
- Enrollment: 889 (2024–2025)
- Student to teacher ratio: 17.10
- Campus type: Urban
- Colors: Black, gold, and white
- Mascot: Lion
- Website: www.williamsonlions.com

L. B. Williamson High School (WHS) is a public high school in the Maysville community in Mobile, Alabama, United States. It is a part of the Mobile County Public School System.

== History ==
Williamson High School began in 1916 as a small neighborhood school, the first in Maysville. It was housed in the Sons and Daughters of Honor Hall located on Weinacker Avenue near Virginia Street.

George Hall, the first teacher, led the school until his death, then Louella Banks became principal. Lillie B. Williamson and a faculty of six teachers succeeded her. After Miss Williamson’s death, the school was renamed in her honor.

Eliza Thompson was principal for the next 27 years until she retired in 1948. Lemuel K. Keeby then became principal of Williamson, which only served grades one through seven.

Over the next few years, a high school was added to accommodate growth in the Maysville community. The high school saw its first graduating class in 1958.

In 1968 the building was expanded to its present capacity. Enrollment rose to more than 1200 students with 67 faculty members.

Keeby served as principal of Williamson for 30 years until his death in 1978.

The next principal was Fred N. Green Jr., who retired in July 1996 after 18 years as principal.

In July 1996, Robert Likely became principal.

That fall, Williamson was re-evaluated by the Southern Association of Colleges and Schools (SACS) and met all requirements for accreditation. In the fall of 1996, Williamson faced a new challenge-preparing students to pass the Alabama Graduation Exit Exam mandated by the state legislature. That year, Mobile County Public Schools also abandoned the traditional 50-minute class periods for the 98-minute block schedule.

Kim D. Staley was principal for the 1999–2000 school year, also the first year of the Comprehensive School Reform Demonstration Grant based on the High Schools That Work model.

In July 2000, Terrence S. Mixon, Sr., was named principal of Williamson High School.

A $5 million remodeling project was started in the fall of 2001.

From 2010 to 2011 the school lost 29% of its students and was one of the two county public schools with the most severe population declines. The No Child Left Behind Act required the school, which was underperforming academically, to offer transfers to students, contributing to the population decline.

== Notable alumni ==
- Rich Caster, former NFL player
- Antonio Coleman, former NFL player
- Nick Fairley, former NFL player
- Vivian Davis Figures, state senator
- Leon Garror, former NFL player
- Geremy Hickbottom, former professional football player
- Jesse James, former NFL player
- Lonnie Johnson, inventor
- Tee Martin, former NFL player, current quarterbacks coach for the Baltimore Ravens
- Matt McCants, football player
- Roger McCreary, professional football player for the Tennessee Titans
- John Mitchell, former NFL player, coach
- Pete Myers, former NBA player, coach
- Greg Richardson, former NFL player
- JaMarcus Russell, former NFL player
- Robert Woodyard Jr., college football player
