= Matt McCants =

American football player (born 1989)

UAB Blazers
- Title: Offensive line coach

Personal information
- Born: August 18, 1989 (age 37); Mobile, Alabama, U.S.
- Listed height: 6 ft 5 in (1.96 m)
- Listed weight: 309 lb (140 kg)

Career information
- High school: Williamson (Mobile)
- College: UAB
- NFL draft: 2012: 6th round, 201st overall pick

Career history

Playing
- New York Giants (2012–2013)*; Oakland Raiders (2013–2016); Cleveland Browns (2016); Chicago Bears (2016); Cleveland Browns (2017); Chicago Bears (2018)*; Birmingham Iron (2019); St. Louis BattleHawks (2020)
- * Offseason or practice squad member only

Coaching
- UAB (2021–2022, 2024–present); Volunteer assistant (2021); Strength and conditioning (2022); Offensive line coach (2024–present)

Operations
- UAB (2023) Director of player development

Awards and highlights
- 2× First-team All-C-USA (2010, 2011)

Career NFL statistics
- Games played: 30
- Games started: 3
- Stats at Pro Football Reference

Matthew Jamaal McCants (born August 18, 1989) is an American former professional football player who was an offensive tackle in the National Football League (NFL). He played college football for the UAB Blazers, starting 42 games at left tackle.

== Early life ==
McCants attended Williamson High School and received honorable mention on the Mobile Press-Register All-Region team as a senior. He helped Williamson High School advance to the class 5A state playoffs. He started one season under head coach Bobby Parrish and only played football his senior year. He played tuba in the high school band before joining the football team prior to his senior year.

== Professional career ==
=== New York Giants ===
McCants was selected by the New York Giants in the sixth round, 201st overall, in the 2012 NFL draft. However, on August 31, 2012, before the beginning of the 2012 NFL season McCants was cut in final roster cuts and was signed to the practice squad, where he spent his entire rookie season.

Before the start of the 2013 NFL season, on August 31, 2013, the New York Giants cut McCants in final roster cuts to get to the regular season roster limit of 53 players.

=== Oakland Raiders ===
On September 2, 2013, McCants was signed to the Oakland Raiders' practice squad. On September 7, 2013, he was promoted to the active roster.

McCants was released by the Raiders on November 26, 2016.

=== Cleveland Browns (first stint) ===
McCants was claimed off waivers by the Browns on November 28, 2016. McCants was waived by the Browns on December 9, 2016.

=== Chicago Bears (first stint) ===
McCants was claimed off waivers by the Bears on December 12, 2016.

=== Cleveland Browns (second stint) ===
On March 27, 2017, McCants re-signed with the Browns. On August 23, 2017, McCants was placed on injured reserve after suffering an ankle injury in the team's second preseason game. He was released on October 10, 2017.

=== Chicago Bears (second stint) ===
On May 14, 2018, McCants signed with the Bears. He was released on September 1, 2018.

=== Birmingham Iron ===
McCants signed with the Birmingham Iron of the Alliance of American Football (AAF) on March 12, 2019, and remained with the team until the league ceased operations in April 2019.

=== St. Louis BattleHawks ===
McCants was selected in the first round, 3rd overall by the St. Louis BattleHawks of the 2020 XFL draft in October 2019. He had his contract terminated when the league suspended operations on April 10, 2020.

== Coaching career ==
McCants spent the 2021 spring season at Fairfield High School and then joined the UAB staff in the summer of 2021 as a volunteer coach. Last season in 2022, he was a strength and conditioning coach who focused on the offensive line. In December 2022, McCants was named UAB's Director of Character Development by Head Coach Trent Dilfer, and enters his third season on staff.
