= Geremy Hickbottom =

American football player (born 1997)

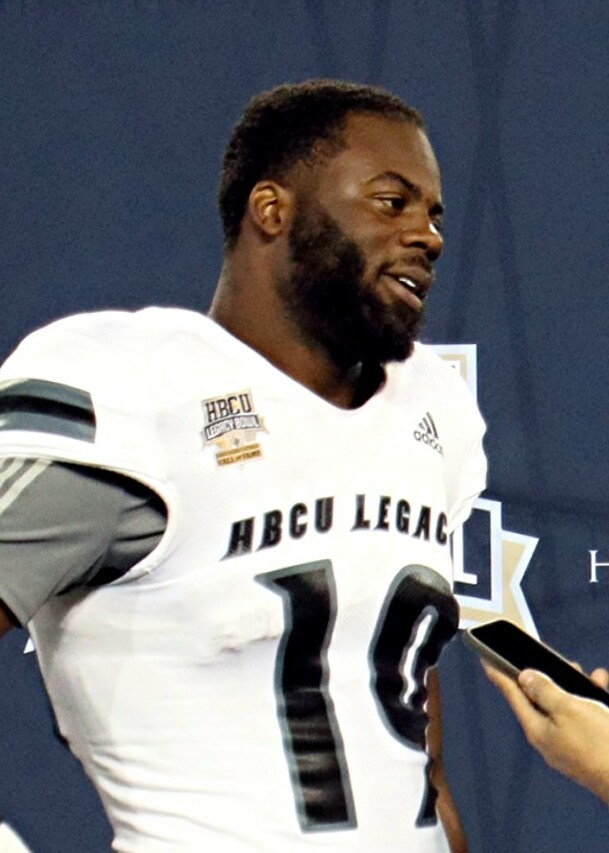
- Hickbottom at the 2022 HBCU Legacy Bowl

No. 19
- Position: Quarterback

Personal information
- Born: July 7, 1997 (age 29); Mobile, Alabama, U.S.
- Listed height: 6 ft 4 in (1.93 m)
- Listed weight: 225 lb (102 kg)

Career information
- High school: Williamson (Mobile)
- College: Grambling State (2017–2020); Tennessee State (2021)
- NFL draft: 2022: undrafted

Career history
- Cologne Crocodiles (2023)*; Massachusetts Pirates (2023)*; DC Defenders (2023); Tucson Sugar Skulls (2024); Duke City Gladiators (2024)
- * Offseason or practice squad member only

Geremy Hickbottom (born July 7, 1997) is an American former football quarterback. He played college football for the Grambling State Tigers and Tennessee State Tigers.

== Early life ==
Hickbottom grew up in Mobile, Alabama, and attended Williamson High School. He played high school football for four years and also was on the track and field team for three. In his sophomore season he rushed for 816 yards and 1,236 passing yards while also earning All-County and First-Team honors. In his junior year he ran for 600 yards and 1,336 passing yards and once again was named to the All-County and First-Team teams. He also earned the Scholar Athlete of the Year. In his senior year in 2016 he rushed for 786 yardsa and passed for a career-high 1,365 yards and his third-consecutive First-Team All-County selection.

== College career ==
=== Grambling State ===
In 2017, Hickbottom appeared in nine games at quarterback for Grambling State. He ran 23 times for 98 yards and scored one touchdown. Through the air he finished thirteen of 29 for 104 yards and two touchdowns.

=== Tennessee State ===
In 2021, Hickbottom played for Tennessee State. He played and started all eleven games for the team and led them to a 5–5 record.

=== Statistics ===
Year	Team	Games		Passing								Rushing			
Year	Team	GP	Record	Comp	Att	Pct	Yards	Avg	TD	Int	Rate	Att	Yards	Avg	TD
2017	Grambling State	9	0–0	13	29	44.8	104	3.6	2	0	97.1	23	98	4.3	1
2018	Grambling State	11	6–5	145	259	56.0	1,945	7.5	16	9	132.5	123	500	4.1	8
2019	Grambling State	11	6–5	171	285	60.0	1,804	6.3	12	7	122.2	124	668	5.4	6
2020	Grambling State	3	0–3	40	61	65.6	380	6.2	1	2	115.4	30	58	1.9	1
2021	Tennessee State	10	5–5	139	241	57.7	1,816	7.5	12	4	134.1	67	270	4.0	7
Career		44	17−18	508	875	58.1	6,049	6.9	43	22	127.3	367	1,594	4.3	23

== Professional career ==
=== Cologne Crocodiles ===
On February 6, 2023, Hickbottom signed with the Cologne Crocodiles of the German Football League (GFL). He opted not to play for the team with the expected birth of his child.

=== Massachusetts Pirates ===
On April 13, 2023, Hickbottom signed with the Massachusetts Pirates of the Indoor Football League (IFL). On April 20, 2023, he was placed on the team's XFL exempt list.

=== DC Defenders ===
On April 19, 2023, Hickbottom signed with the DC Defenders of the XFL. He was listed as inactive for the team's opening playoff game against the Seattle Sea Dragons. He was not part of the roster after the 2024 UFL dispersal draft on January 15, 2024.

=== Tucson Sugar Skulls ===
On February 5, 2024, Hickbottom signed with the Tucson Sugar Skulls of the IFL. He was released on March 25.

=== Duke City Gladiators ===
On March 27, 2024, Hickbottom signed with the IFL's Duke City Gladiators. He was released on May 2.

Hickbottom retired from professional football on November 6, 2024.
