= Donta Simpson =

American football player

No. 8 – Missouri Tigers
- Position: Defensive tackle
- Class: Sophomore

Personal information
- Listed height: 6 ft 4 in (1.93 m)
- Listed weight: 300 lb (136 kg)

Career information
- High school: Chaminade–Madonna (Hollywood, Florida)
- College: Miami (FL) (2025); Missouri (2026–present)
- Stats at ESPN

Donta Simpson is an American college football defensive tackle for the Missouri Tigers. He previously played for the Miami Hurricanes.

== Early life ==
Simpson attended Chaminade–Madonna College Preparatory School in Hollywood, Florida. As a senior, he was the Broward 4A-1A Football Defensive Player of the Year after recording 60 tackles and 15 sacks. He originally committed to the University of Maryland, College Park to play college football before flipping his commitment to the University of Miami.

== College career ==
In his lone season with the Hurricanes in 2025, Simpson played in eight games and had four tackles. After the season, he entered the transfer portal and committed to the University of Missouri. Simpson missed time during the Summer due to a medical condition but returned prior to his first season with the Tigers in 2026.
