= Antonio Coleman =

American football player (born 1986)

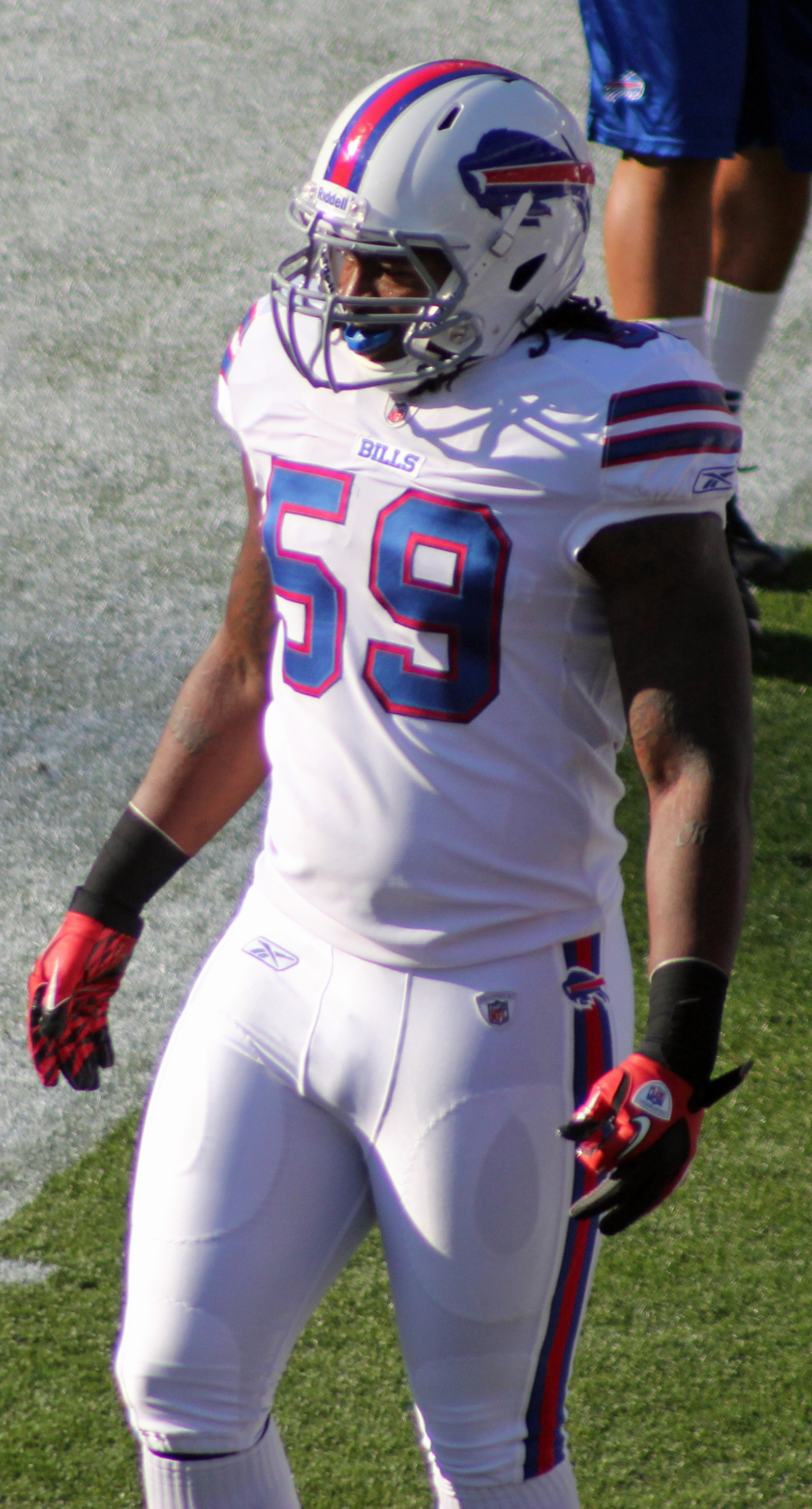
- Coleman with the Buffalo Bills in 2011

No. 59, 90, 94, 92
- Position: Defensive end

Personal information
- Born: September 1, 1986 (age 40); Mobile, Alabama, U.S.
- Listed height: 6 ft 2 in (1.88 m)
- Listed weight: 255 lb (116 kg)

Career information
- High school: Williamson (Mobile)
- College: Auburn
- NFL draft: 2010: undrafted

Career history
- Buffalo Bills (2010); New York Giants (2011)*; Buffalo Bills (2011)*; Arizona Cardinals (2011); Sacramento Mountain Lions (2012); Saskatchewan Roughriders (2013); Hamilton Tiger-Cats (2014–2015)
- * Offseason or practice squad member only

Awards and highlights
- 2× First-team All-SEC (2008, 2009)

Career NFL statistics
- Total tackles: 16
- Stats at Pro Football Reference

Antonio Coleman (born September 1, 1986) is an American former professional football player who was a defensive end in the National Football League (NFL). He played college football for the Auburn Tigers, was named to the Associated Press All-Southeastern Conference football first-team in 2008 and was considered one of the top outside linebacker prospects for the 2010 NFL draft.

He was a member of the Buffalo Bills, New York Giants and Arizona Cardinals of the National Football League (NFL), the Sacramento Mountain Lions of the United Football League (UFL), and the Saskatchewan Roughriders and Hamilton Tiger-Cats of the Canadian Football League (CFL).

== College career ==
Coleman led Auburn with six sacks and 10.5 tackles for loss in 2008. He finished the season with 46 tackles (29 solo, 17 assists) and had a team-high 13 quarterback hurries, as well as a forced fumble and a pass break-up. He was named the SEC's Defensive Lineman of the Week following Auburn's 14–12 victory over Tennessee September 27 after completing four tackles including a sack and 1.6 tackles for loss.

Coleman was named to the ESPN.com 2009 preseason All-SEC first-team. Despite having a cast on his right hand the first 7 weeks of the season, Coleman still finished as the best pass rusher in the SEC, finishing the 2009 season ranked first in sacks and second in tackles for loss.

== Professional career ==
=== Buffalo Bills ===
Coleman was signed as an undrafted rookie free agent by the Buffalo Bills on April 25, 2010. He was waived by the team on September 3, 2011.

=== New York Giants ===
On September 28, Coleman was signed to the New York Giants' practice squad.

=== Return to Buffalo ===
The Buffalo Bills signed Coleman off of the Giants' practice squad on October 25 after a season-ending injury to Shawne Merriman. He was released on December 17, 2011.

=== Saskatchewan Roughriders ===
On April 29, 2013, he signed with the Saskatchewan Roughriders of the Canadian Football League (CFL).

=== Hamilton Tiger-Cats ===
He signed with the Hamilton Tiger-Cats of the CFL on May 31, 2014.
