= Maysville Historic District (Mobile, Alabama) =

Historic district in Alabama, United States

- U.S. National Register of Historic Places
- U.S. Historic district
- Location within Mobile, Alabama Location within Alabama Location within the United States
- Location: Bounded by Virginia, Ann, Duval & Houston Sts., Mobile, Alabama
- Coordinates: 30°40′9″N 88°4′36″W
- Area: 451 acres (183 ha)
- NRHP reference No.: 13000959
- Added to NRHP: December 25, 2013

The Maysville Historic District is a historic district in Mobile, Alabama, United States. The district covers 451 acres (183 ha) and contains 1121 properties located southwest of downtown and directly south of the Leinkauf Historic District. Platted in 1871 in the midst of a recession in Mobile, the neighborhood did not begin to develop until the late 1890s. Maysville has long been a working class neighborhood; many late 1890s and early 1900s houses were bungalows and cottages, some with modest Victorian influences. Some larger and more decorated houses were built in the northeastern portion of the neighborhood. In the early 20th century and into World War I and World War II, the Port of Mobile and its shipyards became a focus of Mobile's economy, and the population grew in response. The early 20th century saw many craftsman-style bungalows and four square houses built. Minimalist Traditional and some ranch-style houses became popular around and after World War II. Notable contributing buildings in the district are Ladd–Peebles Stadium, built in 1948, and Williamson High School, built in 1965. The district was listed on the National Register of Historic Places in 2013.
