= Chaminade–Madonna College Preparatory School =

Private school in Hollywood, Florida, US

Coordinates: 26.015°N 80.196°W

Location
- 500 East Chaminade Drive; Hollywood, Broward County, Florida 33021; United States

Information
- Type: Private, coeducational
- Motto: Ad Mundum Meliorem (Toward a Better World)
- Religious affiliations: Catholic, Marianist
- Patron saint: William Joseph Chaminade
- Established: August 1960
- Oversight: Marianist Province of the United States
- Principal: N/A
- Head of school: Dr. Judith Mucheck
- Chaplain: Fr. Robert Boufet, S.M.
- Grades: 9–12
- Gender: Co-ed
- Enrollment: 630 (2024-2025)
- Average class size: 20
- Colors: Scarlet, white, and blue
- Mascot: Lion
- Accreditation: Southern Association of Colleges and Schools
- Website: cmlions.org

Chaminade–Madonna College Preparatory (CMCP) is a private Marianist school located in Hollywood, Florida, United States, on Chaminade Drive, in front of Nativity Catholic School in the Roman Catholic Archdiocese of Miami. Covering high school and college preparatory curricula, it runs from 9th grade to 12th grade. The school has been accredited by the Southern Association of Colleges and Schools since 1921 and is a Blue Ribbon School of Excellence.

== History ==
=== 1960-1988 ===
In response to the growing population, the Archdiocese of Miami invited the Marianists and the School Sisters of Notre Dame to establish a school for boys, Chaminade High School, and a school for girls, Madonna Academy. Under the direction of Bro. Joseph Spehar, S.M., and Sister Eugene Marie, SSND, Chaminade High School and Madonna Academy became operational in 1960.

In 1963, Bro. Donald Gaskill, S.M. was appointed principal of Chaminade High School to continue to operate the school. He would remain until 1969, with the appointment of Bro. Michael Galvin, S.M.. He was primarily responsible for obtaining accreditation from the Southern Association of Colleges and Schools. Chaminade High School was accredited for the first time in 1973. In 1973, Fr. Richard Knuge, S.M. was appointed principal. Under his administration, construction of a school chapel and library was completed. The school's fifth principal, Bro. Donald Winfree, S.M., supervised the construction of the Strickroth Classroom building, named in honor of Bro. John Strickroth, S.M.

In 1982, Fr. Chris Conlon, S.M., was appointed principal. This same year, Bro. John Campbell, S.M., was appointed the school's first President. His primary responsibility was to handle the finances of the school.

In the mid-80s parts of the movie Aladdin were filmed at the gym of the Chaminade Lions.

In 1986, Bro. Raymond Purcell, S.M., succeeded Fr. Conlon as the leader of the school. Facing declining enrollment and financial difficulties, in 1988, the Archdiocese of Miami, the Superior General of the Marianists and the School Sisters of Notre Dame agreed to merge Chaminade High School and Madonna Academy.

=== 1988-present ===
In August 1988, Chaminade–Madonna College Preparatory was established as a coed high school. Longtime Chaminade High School teacher, counselor, and administrator, Robert Minnaugh, was named principal and charged with forming a new vision. Fr. Dan Doyle, S.M., was named the first president of the new school. Fr. Richard Knuge, S.M. succeeded Fr. Doyle in 1992. In that year, Chaminade–Madonna was honored by the Department of Education with the Blue Ribbon School of Excellence Award. Four years later, Bro. John Campbell, S.M. was appointed president. During his tenure as president, he worked diligently with Mr. Minnaugh to complete construction of the Einstein Building and the renovation of Marianist Hall (which contains the department chair offices).

In 1998, Robert Minnaugh announced his retirement. Longtime assistant principal Ann McGrath was named the interim principal through the 1997/1998 school year. Under some criticism, Patrick Snay was appointed principal in the summer of 1999. Under his leadership, the school's focus turned to the development of a sports program. This included the construction of a multimillion-dollar sports complex, increased scholarship availability and other improvements that led to an award-winning program. In addition, the Learning Center was established to help students suffering from learning disabilities.

In 2002, Fr. John Thompson, S.M., was appointed president of the school. His initial focus was the construction of the athletic fields. The newly renovated athletic complex was completed in December 2004. He led the school through its first Capital Campaign, highlighted by the construction of a new Fine Arts Center, a project that had initially been proposed in 1998.

In July 2003, the first Hispanic principal of the school, and first woman, Gloria Ramos, was appointed.

In the fall of 2007, the house system was implemented. This complements the formal system of classroom education by organizing students into small groups to develop leadership skills and foster the Marianist commitment to community.

On May 15, 2007, Mark Guandolo resigned as the athletic director and head football coach one year after his son graduated from C-M; he took the head coaching job at Cypress Bay High School. Guandolo had success as the football coach with a record of 81-13 and two state championships over seven years.

In July 2008, Father Larry Doersching, S.M., was appointed president.

The 2009–2010 school year marked Chaminade–Madonna's 50th anniversary. It began in August 2009 with a cake cutting ceremony, and an aerial photograph of students, faculty, and staff forming a "50." C-M traditions and events throughout the school year continued to commemorate the rich history of Chaminade High School, Madonna Academy, and Chaminade–Madonna College Preparatory over the previous 50 years.

In October 2010, Chaminade–Madonna was voted the "Best School in Hollywood second to South Broward High School" in the "Best of Hollywood" contest sponsored by the Hollywood Gazette.

In July 2011, Teresita Vazquez Wardlow (class of 1981) was appointed as the new principal.

In 2012–2013, Chaminade–Madonna announced its new educational technology initiative, which required all students to have iPads.

In 2015 a new president was announced. Dr. Judith Mucheck was the first lady president of Chaminade–Madonna since its founding in 1960. All previous presidents were professed Brothers or Priests of the Society of Mary (Marianists).

In September 2025, assistant head of school Raiza Echemendia was arrested and charged with felony grand theft after, according to police documents, she "attempted to conceal 11 items of clothing and shoes, worth more than $876, inside her Coach bag." Police said that Echemendia was caught as soon as she walked out the door. Echemendia, who had been working at Chaminade–Madonna for 26 years in various capacities, was terminated weeks after the incident. Families and students where shocked to hear of Echemendia's arrest.

== About ==
The school currently offers remedial classes in numerous subjects, including both honors and AP courses to qualifying students. A unique "Spring Session" program takes place each February, allowing students to engage in numerous on and off campus activities. These range from painting, to bioethics, to trips abroad.

The Chaminade–Madonna Theatre Company currently produces two productions each year, down from the four produced in years past.

== Notable alumni ==
Sports

- D'Angelo Ponds '23 - NFL: New York Jets, defensive back
- Andy Borregales '21 NFL: New England Patriots, place kicker
- Josh Ali '17 - NFL: Atlanta Falcons, wide receiver
- Anthony Johnson '17 - NFL: New Orleans Saints, cornerback
- Marquise Brown '15 - NFL: Baltimore Ravens, wide receiver
- Kamar Aiken '07 - NFL: Baltimore Ravens, wide receiver
- Jon Beason '03 - NFL: New York Giants, linebacker
- Cary Williams '03 - NFL: Seattle Seahawks, cornerback
- Bill Capece '77 - NFL: Tampa Bay Buccaneers, place kicker
- David Shula '77 - NFL: Coach
- Joe Klink - Major League Baseball, pitcher
- Toumani Camara '19 - NBA: Portland Trail Blazers, forward
- Derrek Cooper '26 – Texas Longhorns football team running back
- Koby Howard '25 - Penn State Nittany Lions football team wide receiver
- Donta Simpson '25 – Missouri Tigers football team defensive tackle
- Jeremiah Smith '24 - Ohio State University football team, wide receiver
- CJ Bailey '24 - North Carolina State University football team, quarterback
- Joshisa Trader '24 - NC State Wolfpack, wide receiver
- Edwin Joseph '23 – Ole Miss Rebels, defensive back
- Kenyatta Jackson '22 – Ohio State University football team, defensive lineman
- Henry Colombi '17 - Marshall University football team quarterback
- Billy Mitchell '83 - professional video game player and hot sauce company owner
- Sean White - Auburn Tigers football quarterback

Theater

- Bobby Pearce '79 - Broadway costume designer

Music

- Cyrus Bolooki '98 - drummer for New Found Glory

Broadcasting and journalism

- Dan Le Batard - Miami Herald columnist
- Chris Myers '76 - Fox sportscaster-commentator

Politics

- Sheila Cherfilus-McCormick - Member of the U.S. House of Representatives from Florida's 20th district

Television

- Chris Nuñez - tattoo artist on TLC reality show Miami Ink

== See also ==
- William Joseph Chaminade
- Marianists
