= Greg Richardson (American football) =

American football player (born 1964)

No. 89
- Position: Wide receiver

Personal information
- Born: October 6, 1964 (age 62); Mobile, Alabama, U.S.
- Listed height: 5 ft 7 in (1.70 m)
- Listed weight: 171 lb (78 kg)

Career information
- High school: Williamson (Mobile)
- College: Alabama
- NFL draft: 1987: 6th round, 156th overall pick

Career history
- Minnesota Vikings (1987), (1988); Tampa Bay Buccaneers (1988)

Career NFL statistics
- Return yards: 95
- Stats at Pro Football Reference

Gregory Lamar Richardson (born October 6, 1964) is an American former professional football player who was a wide receiver in the National Football League (NFL) for the Minnesota Vikings and Tampa Bay Buccaneers. He played college football for the Alabama Crimson Tide.

== Early life ==
Richardson was born and raised in Mobile, Alabama, and attended Lillie B. Williamson High School.

== College ==
Richardson attended the University of Alabama, he played college football for the Crimson Tide. He was a starter on the team for three years, and he lettered in all four. Richardson led the SEC in punts received his freshman, sophomore, and senior seasons. During his senior year, Richardson led the SEC in punt return yards with 329. Richardson returned a SEC leading one punt return in his Freshman and Senior seasons.

== Career ==
=== Professional athlete ===
Pre-draft measurables
Height	Weight	40-yard dash	10-yard split	20-yard split	20-yard shuttle	Vertical jump	Broad jump	Bench press
5 ft 7 1/4 in (1.71 m)	184 lb (83 kg)	4.35 s	1.55 s	2.54 s	4.21 s	28.0 in (0.71 m)	9 ft 5 in (2.87 m)	1 reps
All values from NFL Combine

In the 1987 NFL draft, Richardson was selected 156th overall in the sixth round by the Minnesota Vikings. Richardson played in two games his rookie year. Richardson received four punts for a total of 19 yards. He also received four kick returns for a total of 76 yards.

The following year, he appeared in two games for the Tampa Bay Buccaneers.

Richardson retired in 1988.

=== Post-athletic career ===
Richardson has worked for the Mobile County Department of Public Works.

== Personal life ==
Richardson is married. He has five children including a set of twins.
