= Roger McCreary =

American football player (born 2000)

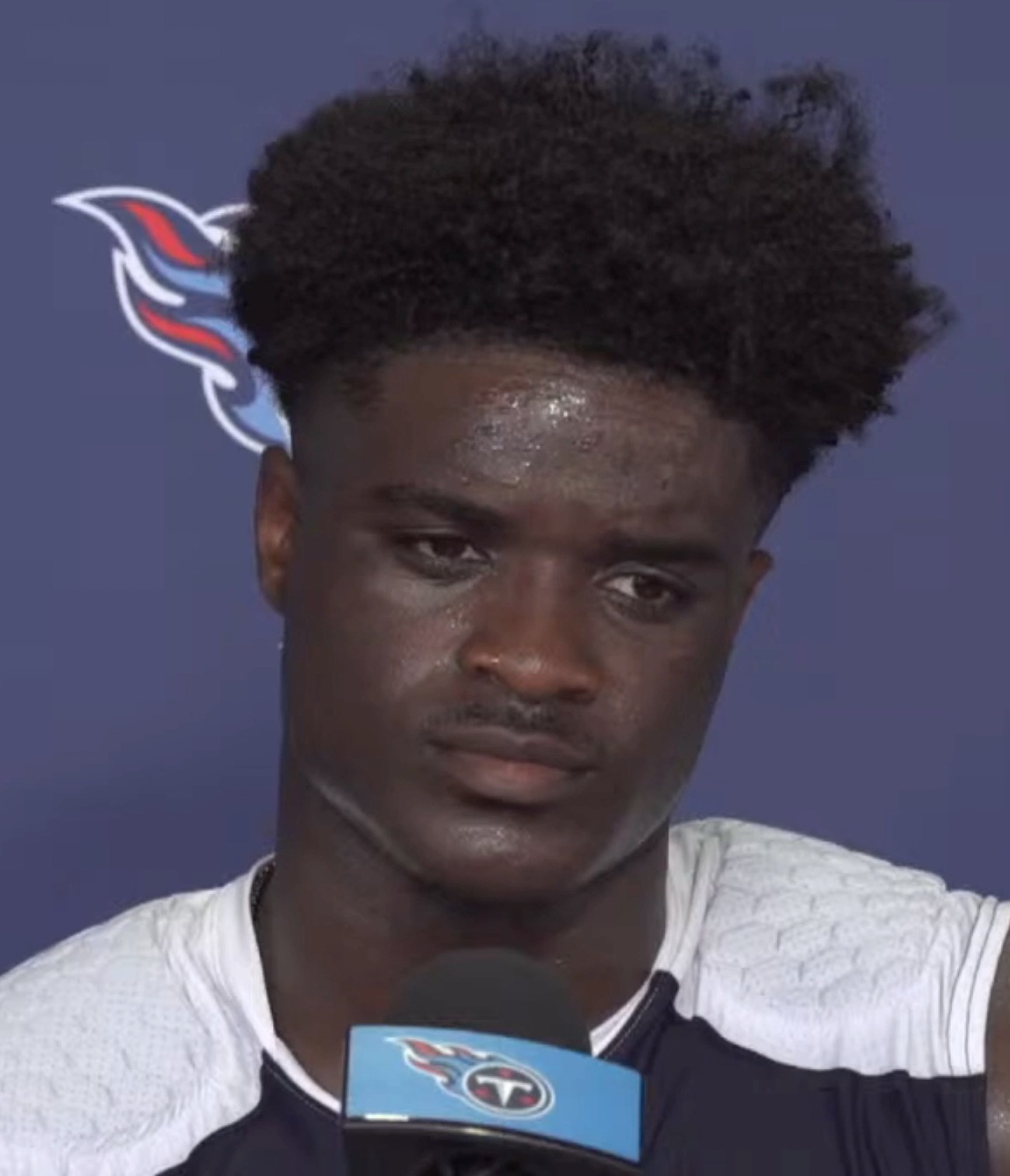
- McCreary with the Tennessee Titans in 2022

No. 21 – Detroit Lions
- Position: Cornerback
- Roster status: Active

Personal information
- Born: February 10, 2000 (age 26); Mobile, Alabama, U.S.
- Listed height: 5 ft 11 in (1.80 m)
- Listed weight: 190 lb (86 kg)

Career information
- High school: Williamson (Mobile)
- College: Auburn (2018–2021)
- NFL draft: 2022: 2nd round, 35th overall pick

Career history
- Tennessee Titans (2022–2025); Los Angeles Rams (2025); Detroit Lions (2026–present)

Awards and highlights
- First-team All-American (2021); First-team All-SEC (2021)

Career NFL statistics as of Week 5, 2026
- Tackles: 275
- Sacks: 5
- Forced fumbles: 2
- Pass deflections: 24
- Interceptions: 3
- Stats at Pro Football Reference

Roger Lee McCreary (born February 10, 2000) is an American professional football cornerback for the Detroit Lions of the National Football League (NFL). He played college football for the Auburn Tigers. McCreary was drafted by the Tennessee Titans in the second round of the 2022 NFL draft.

== Early life ==
McCreary attended Williamson High School in Mobile, Alabama. Coming out of high school, McCreary was a 3 star prospect and was the 87th ranked cornerback. He committed to Auburn University to play college football after de-committing from South Alabama.

== College career ==
McCreary played in seven games as a true freshman at Auburn in 2018. He played in all 13 games in 2019, recording 36 tackles and one interception. McCreary became a full time starter during his junior year in 2020. In 10 games, he had 45 tackles and three interceptions.

He returned to Auburn for his senior year in 2021, rather than enter the 2021 NFL draft. In 2021, McCreary recorded 49 tackles, two interceptions and an SEC best 14 pass breakups. Following his senior season, McCreary was named as a First-team All-American by both the Associated Press and ESPN, as well as being selected consensus First-team All-SEC by both coaches and the AP.

== Professional career ==
Pre-draft measurables
Height	Weight	Arm length	Hand span	Wingspan	40-yard dash	10-yard split	20-yard split	20-yard shuttle	Three-cone drill	Vertical jump	Broad jump	Bench press
5 ft 11 3/8 in (1.81 m)	190 lb (86 kg)	28 7/8 in (0.73 m)	9 in (0.23 m)	5 ft 10 5/8 in (1.79 m)	4.50 s	1.59 s	2.63 s	4.29 s	6.96 s	31.5 in (0.80 m)	9 ft 8 in (2.95 m)	19 reps
All values from NFL Combine/Pro Day

=== Tennessee Titans ===
The Tennessee Titans selected McCreary in the second round (35th overall) of the 2022 NFL draft. He was the fifth cornerback selected.

He started all 17 games in his rookie season, finishing with 84 total tackles, one interception, and eight passes defensed. McCreary also helped force a notable turnover on Week 15 against the Los Angeles Chargers, by jumping out of bounds to tip a pass mid-air by Justin Herbert, which was received by Joshua Kalu for an assisted interception.

McCreary moved into the starting nickelback position for the 2023 season. He played in 15 games with 11 starts, recording 86 tackles, two sacks, six passes defensed, one interception, and a forced fumble.

During the 2024 season, McCreary appeared in 15 games, recording 50 tackles, a pass deflection, three pressures, and a sack.

=== Los Angeles Rams ===
On October 27, 2025, McCreary and a conditional 2026 sixth-round pick were traded to the Los Angeles Rams in exchange for a conditional fifth-round pick. He was placed on injured reserve on November 26 after suffering a hip injury in Week 12 against the Tampa Bay Buccaneers. McCreary was activated on December 29, ahead of the team's Week 17 matchup against the Atlanta Falcons.

=== Detroit Lions ===
On March 13, 2026, McCreary signed with the Detroit Lions on a one-year contract.

== NFL career statistics ==
Legend
**Bold**	Career high

=== Regular season ===
Year	Team	Games		Tackles					Interceptions						Fumbles			
Year	Team	GP	GS	Comb	Solo	Ast	Sck	TFL	PD	Int	Yds	Avg	Lng	TD	FF	FR	Yds	TD
2022	TEN	**17**	**17**	84	**70**	14	0.0	2	**8**	**1**	4	4.0	4	0	0	0	0	0
2023	TEN	15	11	**86**	62	**24**	**2.0**	7	6	**1**	**18**	**18.0**	**18**	0	1	0	0	0
2024	TEN	15	7	50	43	7	1.0	**12**	1	0	0	0.0	0	0	0	0	0	0
2025	TEN	8	3	33	21	12	1.0	1	2	**1**	0	0.0	0	0	**2**	0	0	0
2025	LAR	6	0	4	2	2	0.0	0	0	0	0	0.0	0	0	0	0	0	0
2026	DET	5	3	18	14	4	1.0	1	7	0	0	0.0	0	0	1	0	0	0
Career		66	41	275	212	63	5.0	23	24	3	22	7.3	18	0	2	0	0	0

=== Postseason ===
Year	Team	Games		Tackles					Interceptions						Fumbles			
Year	Team	GP	GS	Cmb	Solo	Ast	Sck	TFL	Int	Yds	Avg	Lng	TD	PD	FF	FR	Yds	TD
2025	LAR	3	1	8	5	3	0.0	0	0	0	0.0	0	0	1	0	0	0	0
Career		3	1	8	5	3	0.0	0	0	0	0.0	0	0	1	0	0	0	0

== Personal life ==
McCreary's pregame meal is two plates of baked beans with eight packets of sugar.
