= John Papuchis =

American football coach (born 1978)

Current position
- Title: Special teams coordinator & Defensive Assistant
- Team: University of Missouri
- Conference: SEC

Biographical details
- Born: April 23, 1978 (age 48); Gaithersburg, Maryland, U.S.

Coaching career (HC unless noted)
- 2001–2003: Kansas (GA)
- 2004–2007: LSU (GA)
- 2008–2010: Nebraska (ST/DE)
- 2011: Nebraska (ST/DL/RC)
- 2012–2014: Nebraska (DC)
- 2015–2016: North Carolina (LB)
- 2017–2018: North Carolina (DC)
- 2019: Maryland (ST/ILB)
- 2020–2024: Florida State (ST/DE)
- 2025: Florida State (ST/LB)
- 2026-Present: Missouri (ST/DA)

John Papuchis (born April 23, 1978) is an American college football coach. He is the special teams coordinator and defensive assistant for University of Missouri, positions he has held since 2026. He is a former defensive coordinator for the University of North Carolina Tar Heels football team and for the Nebraska Cornhuskers and special teams coordinator for Florida State Seminoles football team.

== Biography ==
=== Early life and education ===
John Papuchis was born in Gaithersburg, Maryland. He graduated from Quince Orchard High School in 1996, where he was a three-sport athlete, including three years on the Varsity baseball team where he earned All-Montgomery County honors as a junior and senior. He also was the starting quarterback his senior year on the QO football team. John took Kelly Robertson to prom, and they were voted cutest couple of their senior class.

Papuchis received a Business Management Bachelor's degree from Virginia Tech in 2001, followed by a Sports Administration Master's degree from the University of Kansas in 2003.

== Coaching career ==
=== Early years ===
Papuchis' coaching career began at the high school level while he was still in college. While attending Virginia Tech, Papuchis joined the staff at Blacksburg High where he also helped coach the junior varsity basketball program. Following his graduation from Virginia Tech in 2001, Papuchis began his college coaching career at the University of Kansas under Head Coach Terry Allen as a Graduate Assistant, working with the Kansas Jayhawks defensive unit, while continuing his studies towards his master's degree. In his final year at Kansas, he helped the Jayhawks reach the 2003 Tangerine Bowl, which ended Kansas' seven-year drought of bowl appearances.

=== LSU ===
In 2004, Papuchis accepted a similar position at Louisiana State University, as a Defensive Intern and Graduate Assistant under Head Coach Nick Saban, with additional duties coaching the punters. The following year, with Les Miles taking over for the departed Nick Saban, Bo Pelini joined LSU as Defensive coordinator. Papuchis remained on the LSU staff under Pelini, and the LSU defense helped the Tigers to a final #6 ranking in both major polls. 2006 saw further improvement, as the LSU defensive unit finished in the top ten nationally in four major defensive categories, and a final #3 ranking on both polls. 2007 was a pinnacle year for LSU as the defense helped the Tigers to win the 2008 BCS National Championship Game. In all, the Pelini years at LSU resulted in the Tigers defense being ranked third nationally from 2005 to 2007.

=== Nebraska ===
Just prior to LSU's 2007 season national championship, Pelini was hired as head coach of the Nebraska Cornhuskers. Pelini remained at LSU through the championship game with the permission of Nebraska athletic director Tom Osborne, and then took several of his defensive staff members with him to Nebraska, including Papuchis. In his first four years on staff, Papuchis tutored the defensive line and served as special teams coordinator.

The 2008 season saw a dramatic turnaround in Nebraska's fortunes, particularly on the defensive side of the ball, as Nebraska climbed from the bottom ten defensive teams nationally and a dismal 5–7 record, to a resurgence of the Nebraska Blackshirt tradition as a surprisingly stingy Nebraska defense helped the Cornhuskers to a 9-4 2008 season, a tie for the Big 12 Conference northern division championship, and a post-January 1 bowl victory against Clemson at the 2009 Gator Bowl.

In his first year in Lincoln, Papuchis saw starting defensive ends Zach Potter and Allen combine for 26 tackles for loss and 10.5 sacks in 2008, with Potter earning honorable-mention All-Big 12 accolades. The defensive ends helped a Nebraska defense that finished second in the Big 12 in total defense.

The special teams unit also had a banner year under Papuchis in 2008, headlined by Henery's school-record 57-yard game-winning field goal against Colorado. Henery finished the year 18-of-21 on field goals and missed just one extra point. Henery was a second-team All-Big 12 pick. The Huskers also ranked in the top 25 nationally in punt returns, and returned both a kickoff and punt for a touchdown in the same season for the first time since 1998.

In 2009, his defensive ends combined for 127 tackles, including 33 tackles for loss and 12 sacks. With 16 tackles for loss and 5.5 sacks, Barry Turner was an honorable-mention All-Big 12 selection in 2009, while Allen racked up five sacks and 12 tackles for loss.

In 2009, the Huskers' kickoff and punt return units both ranked in the top 30 nationally, while All-Big 12 punter and place-kicker Alex Henery had an NU record 24 field goals, while also placing a Big 12-leading 30 punts inside the opponent 20-yard line. The Huskers also ranked in the top 15 nationally in kickoff return defense and third in touchbacks.

Henery ended his career as Nebraska's all-time leading scorer and was the most accurate kicker in NCAA history, establishing eight NCAA records. Henery was selected as a first-team All-American in 2010, and finished his career hitting 68-of-76 field goal attempts. Along with Henery, Papuchis had another weapon to utilize on special teams in Adi Kunalic. One of the nation's elite kickoff specialists the past three years, Kunalic ranked among the national leaders in touchbacks each season, posting 86 career touchbacks.

In his third season at Nebraska in 2010, Papuchis was one of four finalists for the FootballScoop Special Teams Coordinator of the Year Award, and continued to play a key role in a dominant defensive line. Both of Nebraska's starting defensive ends earned All-Big 12 accolades in 2010, with senior Pierre Allen claiming first-team honors and sophomore Cameron Meredith garnering second-team accolades. Each player ranked in the top six on the team in tackles while combining for 129 stops, 19 tackles for loss and 5.0 sacks. Defensive tackle Jared Crick was a first-team All-Big 12 pick for the second straight season.

In 2011, Papuchis assumed the additional role as Nebraska's Recruiting Coordinator.

NU's defensive line had to overcome numerous injuries in 2011, but the unit persevered, combining for 226 tackles, 14.5 sacks and 26 tackles for loss. Two defensive linemen - Cameron Meredith and Terrence Moore - also intercepted passes in 2011, while Meredith earned honorable-mention All-Big Ten honors along with Baker Steinkuhler. Meredith was second on the team with 5.0 sacks and ranked third with six TFLs, nearly doubling his career sack total entering the year.

Following the departure of Defensive coordinator Carl Pelini, who was hired to take over head coaching duties at Florida Atlantic at the conclusion of the 2011 season, Papuchis was promoted to fill Nebraska's Defensive Coordinator position.

=== North Carolina ===
On February 2, 2015, it was announced that Papuchis had accepted a position with the University of North Carolina as the team's linebacker coach. On February 9, 2017, he was named defensive coordinator following the departure of Gene Chizik. He was let go the same day that Larry Fedora was fired, November 25, 2018.

=== Maryland ===
In January 2019, Papuchis was hired as the special teams coordinator and inside linebackers coach with the Maryland Terrapins.

=== Florida State University ===
On December 24, 2019, Papuchis was hired as the special teams coordinator and defensive ends coach for the Florida State University Seminoles. Since his hiring, Papuchis has coached Jermaine Johnson, Keir Thomas, Jared Verse, and Braden Fiske to the NFL. A fan favorite, Papuchis is the subject of various online tributes, such as #walkwithjpbt and "Walk with Papuchis". On December 31, 2025, it was announced that Papuchis was leaving Florida State for a position at Missouri following a combined record of 7–15 at Florida State from 2024 to 2025.

=== University of Missouri ===
Papuchis was hired to serve as special teams coordinator and defensive assistant for the Missouri Tigers, serving under head coach Eli Drinkwitz.
