= Robert Woodyard Jr. =

American football player (born 2003)

No. 0 – Missouri Tigers
- Position: Linebacker
- Class: (redshirt) Senior

Personal information
- Born: July 10, 2003 (age 23)
- Listed height: 6 ft 0 in (1.83 m)
- Listed weight: 245 lb (111 kg)

Career information
- High school: Williamson (Mobile, Alabama)
- College: Auburn (2022–2025); Missouri (2026–present)
- Stats at ESPN

Robert Woodyard Jr. (born July 10, 2003) is an American football linebacker for the Missouri Tigers. He previously played for the Auburn Tigers.

== Early life ==
Woodyard Jr. attended Williamson High School in Mobile, Alabama. He was rated as a four-star recruit and the fifth overall player in the state of Alabama by 247Sports, where he committed to play college football for the Alabama Crimson Tide over offers from Auburn and Georgia. However, Woodyard Jr. flipped his commitment and signed to play for the Auburn Tigers.

== College career ==
=== Auburn ===
In his first three seasons from 2022 to 2024, Woodyard Jr. recorded 21 tackles with three going for a loss, and a pass deflection in 17 games. In week 4 of the 2025 season, Woodyard Jr. racked up five tackles in a loss against Oklahoma. In week 8, he notched 11 tackles with four going for a loss in a double-overtime loss against Missouri. Woodyard Jr. finished the 2025 season with 67 tackles with seven being for a loss, and two sacks in 11 starts. After the conclusion of the season, he entered the NCAA transfer portal.

=== Missouri ===
Woodyard Jr. transferred to play for the Missouri.
