= 2020 Grambling State Tigers football team =

American college football season

2020 Grambling State Tigers football
- Conference: Southwestern Athletic Conference
- West Division
- Record: 0–4 (0–4 SWAC)
- Head coach: Broderick Fobbs (7th season)
- Home stadium: Eddie Robinson Stadium

2020 Southwestern Athletic Conference football standings
	Conf.			Overall
Team	W		L	W		L
East Division
No. 24 Alabama A&M x$	3	–	0	5	–	0
Alabama State	3	–	2	3	–	3
Jackson State	3	–	2	4	–	3
Mississippi Valley State	1	–	3	1	–	3
West Division
Arkansas–Pine Bluff x	4	–	0	4	–	1
Southern	4	–	1	5	–	1
Prairie View A&M*	2	–	1	2	–	1
Texas Southern	1	–	2	1	–	2
Grambling State	0	–	4	0	–	4
Championship: Alabama A&M 40, Arkansas–Pine Bluff 33
$ – Conference champion; x – Division champion/co-champions; Note: The SWAC played a spring conference-only schedule (February–May 2021) due to COVID-19 pandemic. Alcorn State opted out of the spring season; all of their scheduled games were counted as forfeit wins for their opponents. * – Ineligible for FCS postseason play due to NCAA sanctions.; Rankings from STATS Poll

The 2020 Grambling State Tigers football team represented Grambling State University in the 2020–21 NCAA Division I FCS football season. The Tigers were led by seventh-year head coach Broderick Fobbs and played their home games at Eddie Robinson Stadium in Grambling, Louisiana as members of the West Division of the Southwestern Athletic Conference (SWAC).

On July 20, 2020, the Southwestern Athletic Conference announced that it would not play fall sports due to the COVID-19 pandemic, which includes the football program. The conference is formalizing plans to conduct a competitive schedule for football during the 2021 spring semester.

== Preseason ==
=== Recruiting class ===
College recruiting information (2020)
Name	Hometown	School	Height	Weight	40^{‡}	Commit date
Lawrence Asiedu; Safety	Cedar Park, TX	Vista Ridge HS; Fort Scott CC	5 ft 11 in (1.80 m)	195 lb (88 kg)	-	Dec 18, 2019
Lawrence Asiedu; Safety	Recruit ratings: Scout: Rivals: 247Sports: ESPN:					
Egan Atkins; Offensive Lne	Tampa, FL	Blake HS; ASA CC	6 ft 3 in (1.91 m)	315 lb (143 kg)	-	Feb 5, 2020
Egan Atkins; Offensive Lne	Recruit ratings: Scout: Rivals: 247Sports: ESPN:					
Dayron Butler; Cornerback	Manor, TX	Manor HS	5 ft 10 in (1.78 m)	175 lb (79 kg)	-	Feb 5, 2020
Dayron Butler; Cornerback	Recruit ratings: Scout: Rivals: 247Sports: ESPN:					
Zion Cage; Defensive Line	Pflugerville, TX	Pflugerville HS; Navarro College	6 ft 7 in (2.01 m)	260 lb (120 kg)	-	Dec 18, 2019
Zion Cage; Defensive Line	Recruit ratings: Scout: Rivals: 247Sports: ESPN:					
Javon Cox; Defensive Line	Lemanville, LA	East Ascension HS	6 ft 3 in (1.91 m)	245 lb (111 kg)	-	Feb 5, 2020
Javon Cox; Defensive Line	Recruit ratings: Scout: Rivals: 247Sports: ESPN:					
Demarion Cleaves; Linebacker	Memphis, TN	Freedom Prep	6 ft 2 in (1.88 m)	210 lb (95 kg)	-	Feb 5, 2020
Demarion Cleaves; Linebacker	Recruit ratings: Scout: Rivals: 247Sports: ESPN:					
Isaiah Conner; Linebacker	Memphis, TN	Freedom Prep	6 ft 2 in (1.88 m)	210 lb (95 kg)	-	Feb 5, 2020
Isaiah Conner; Linebacker	Recruit ratings: Scout: Rivals: 247Sports: ESPN:					
Riyan Cotton; Linebacker	Baton Rouge, LA	Central HS	5 ft 11 in (1.80 m)	230 lb (100 kg)	-	Feb 5, 2020
Riyan Cotton; Linebacker	Recruit ratings: Scout: Rivals: 247Sports: ESPN:					
Keelan Cox; Defensive Line	Manvel, TX	Manvel HS	6 ft 4 in (1.93 m)	220 lb (100 kg)	-	Feb 5, 2020
Keelan Cox; Defensive Line	Recruit ratings: Scout: Rivals: 247Sports: ESPN:					
Josh Darling; Linebacker	Gordo, AL	Gordo HS	6 ft 0 in (1.83 m)	215 lb (98 kg)	-	Feb 5, 2020
Josh Darling; Linebacker	Recruit ratings: Scout: Rivals: 247Sports: ESPN:					
Reyondous Estes; Cornerbacker	East St. Louis, IL	East St. Louis HS; Minnesota; Riverside CC	6 ft 0 in (1.83 m)	175 lb (79 kg)	-	Feb 5, 2020
Reyondous Estes; Cornerbacker	Recruit ratings: Scout: Rivals: 247Sports: ESPN:					
Walter Forte; Linebacker	Jonesboro, GA	Jonesboro HS	6 ft 2 in (1.88 m)	195 lb (88 kg)	-	Feb 5, 2020
Walter Forte; Linebacker	Recruit ratings: Scout: Rivals: 247Sports: ESPN:					
Trenton Grow; Wide Receiver	Edgard, LA	West St. John HS	6 ft 3 in (1.91 m)	185 lb (84 kg)	-	Feb 5, 2020
Trenton Grow; Wide Receiver	Recruit ratings: Scout: Rivals: 247Sports: ESPN:					
Tyron Hall; Cornerback	Frisco, TX	Lone Star HS	6 ft 2 in (1.88 m)	185 lb (84 kg)	-	Feb 5, 2020
Tyron Hall; Cornerback	Recruit ratings: Scout: Rivals: 247Sports: ESPN:					
Josh Jefferson; Offensive Line	Edgewood, MD	St. John's College HS; Massachusetts; ASA CC	6 ft 4 in (1.93 m)	295 lb (134 kg)	-	Feb 5, 2020
Josh Jefferson; Offensive Line	Recruit ratings: Scout: Rivals: 247Sports: ESPN:					
Marquise McKnight; Kicker/Punter	Baton Rouge, LA	Madison Prep	5 ft 10 in (1.78 m)	190 lb (86 kg)	-	Feb 5, 2020
Marquise McKnight; Kicker/Punter	Recruit ratings: Scout: Rivals: 247Sports: ESPN:					
Bryan Powell; Linebacker	Decauter, GA	Southwest DeKalb HS; ASA CC	6 ft 3 in (1.91 m)	210 lb (95 kg)	-	Feb 5, 2020
Bryan Powell; Linebacker	Recruit ratings: Scout: Rivals: 247Sports: ESPN:					
Josh Reed; Linebacker	Houston, TX	Heights HS; Blinn CC	6 ft 0 in (1.83 m)	235 lb (107 kg)	-	Feb 5, 2020
Josh Reed; Linebacker	Recruit ratings: Scout: Rivals: 247Sports: ESPN:					
Jaxson Sanders; Offensive Line	White Hall, AR	White Hall HS	6 ft 3 in (1.91 m)	303 lb (137 kg)	-	Feb 5, 2020
Jaxson Sanders; Offensive Line	Recruit ratings: Scout: Rivals: 247Sports: ESPN:					
Jalon Sheffield; Defensive Line	Tallahassee, FL	Tallahassee Leon HS; Florida Atlantic; South Alabama	6 ft 2 in (1.88 m)	255 lb (116 kg)	-	Dec 18, 2019
Jalon Sheffield; Defensive Line	Recruit ratings: Scout: Rivals: 247Sports: ESPN:					
Myron Stewart; Safety	Port Gibson, MS	Port Gibson HS; Mississippi Gulf Coast CC	6 ft 1 in (1.85 m)	190 lb (86 kg)	-	Dec 18, 2019
Myron Stewart; Safety	Recruit ratings: Scout: Rivals: 247Sports: ESPN:					
DeMarcus Tinsley; Offensive Line	Newnan, GA	Newnan HS; Dodge City CC	6 ft 4 in (1.93 m)	325 lb (147 kg)	-	Dec 18, 2019
DeMarcus Tinsley; Offensive Line	Recruit ratings: Scout: Rivals: 247Sports: ESPN:					
Willie "Trey" Truitt; Wide Receiver	Snellville, GA	South Gwinnett HS	6 ft 3 in (1.91 m)	185 lb (84 kg)	-	Feb 5, 2020
Willie "Trey" Truitt; Wide Receiver	Recruit ratings: Scout: Rivals: 247Sports: ESPN:					
Elijah Walker; Quarterback	Amite, LA	Amite HS; Hinds CC; Louisiana Tech	6 ft 1 in (1.85 m)	190 lb (86 kg)	-	Dec 18, 2019
Elijah Walker; Quarterback	Recruit ratings: Scout: Rivals: 247Sports: ESPN:					
Hurshie Williams; Safety	Harker Heights, TX	Harker Heights HS; Cisco CC; North Texas	6 ft 0 in (1.83 m)	195 lb (88 kg)	-	Dec 18, 2019
Hurshie Williams; Safety	Recruit ratings: Scout: Rivals: 247Sports: ESPN:					

=== Preseason polls ===
The SWAC will release their polls in July 2020.

West Division
Predicted finish	Team	Votes
1		
2		
3		
4		
5		

East Division
Predicted finish	Team	Votes
1		
2		
3		
4		
5		

=== Preseason all–SWAC teams ===
Offense

Defense

== Schedule ==
Due to the SWAC's postponement of the 2020 football season to spring 2021, games against South Alabama, South Carolina State and UTSA were canceled. The SWAC released updated spring schedules on August 17.

Date	Time	Opponent	Site	TV	Result	Attendance
March 6	12:00 p.m.	Jackson State	Eddie Robinson Stadium; Grambling, LA	ESPN3	L 28–33	6,340
March 13	3:00 p.m.	vs. Prairie View A&M	Globe Life Park; Arlington, TX (State Fair Classic)		L 10–17	10,500
March 20	12:00 p.m.	Arkansas–Pine Bluff	Eddie Robinson Stadium; Grambling, LA		L 21–48	5,105
April 17	1:30 p.m.	vs. Southern	Independence Stadium; Shreveport, LA (Bayou Classic)	NBCSN	L 7–49	11,312
All times are in Central time

== Game summaries ==
=== Jackson State ===
Jackson State at Grambling State

Team	1	2	3	4	Total
• JSU Tigers	7	20	0	6	33
GRAM Tigers	14	0	7	7	28

- Date: March 6, 2021
- Location: Eddie Robinson Stadium
  Grambling, LA
- Game start: 12:00 p.m. CST
- Elapsed time: 3 hours and 58 minutes
- Game attendance: 6,340
- Game weather: 60 °F (16 °C)
- TV announcers (ESPN3): Tiffany Greene (play-by-play) and Jay Walker (analyst)

Scoring summary
1	11:34	JSU	Corey Reed Jr. 13-yard pass from Jalon Jones (Noah Anderson kick) (3 plays, 10 yards, 1:17)	JSU 7–0
1	08:04	GRAM	Geremy Hickbottom 2-yard rush (Garrett Urban kick) (9 plays, 61 yards, 3:23)	TIE 7–7
1	04:07	GRAM	Keilon Elder 1-yard rush (Garrett Urban kick)br/>(7 play, 51 yards, 2:30)	GRAM 14–7
2	10:48	JSU	Jalon Jones 4-yard rush (Noah Anderson PAT failed) (9 plays, 67 yards, 4:02)	GRAM 14–13
2	09:05	JSU	Daylen Baldwin 64-yard pass from Jalon Jones (Glenn Misiak kick) (2 plays, 68 yards, 0:44)	JSU 20–14
2	05:00	JSU	Tyson Alexander 33-yard rush (Glenn Misiak kick) (5 plays, 62 yards, 1:39)	JSU 27–14
3	08:50	GRAM	Darrell Clark 15-yard pass from Geremy Hickbottom (Garrett Urban kick) (11 plays, 67 yards, 4:00)	JSU 27–21
4	13:55	GRAM	Keilon Elder 2-yard rush (Garrett Urban kick) (16 plays, 80 yard, 5:45)	GRAM 28–27
4	12:35	JSU	Warren Newman 20-yard pass from Jalon Jones (Noah Anderson PAT failed) (4 plays, 50 yards, 1:13)	JSU 33–28

Statistics	Jackson State	Grambling State
First downs	21	29
Total yards	473	422
Rushing yards	293	182
Passing yards	180	240
Turnovers	2	1
Time of possession	28:06	31:54

Team	Category	Player	Statistics
Jackson State	Passing	Jalon Jones	12/18, 180 yards, 3 TDs
Jackson State	Rushing	Tyson Alexander	17 carries, 184 yards, 1 TD
Jackson State	Receiving	Daylen Baldwin	4 receptions, 95 yards, 1 TD
Grambling State	Passing	Geremy Hickbottom	24/35, 237 yards, 1 TD
Grambling State	Rushing	Geremy Hickbottom	16 carries, 81 yards, 1 TD
Grambling State	Receiving	Dorrell James	6 receptions, 87 yards

=== Vs. Prairie View A&M ===
Prairie View A&M vs. Grambling State

Team	1	2	3	4	Total
• Panthers	3	7	7	0	17
Tigers	0	0	10	0	10

- Date: March 13, 2021
- Location: Globe Life Park
  Arlington, TX
- Game start: 3:00 p.m. CST
- Elapsed time: 3 hours and 20 minutes
- Game attendance: 10,500
- Game weather: 75 °F (24 °C) • Weather: Light Rain
- Referee: Tony Ross

Scoring summary
1	05:10	PVAMU	Luis Reyes 36-yard field goal (19 plays, 59 yards, 6:50)	PVAMU 3–0
2	14:31	PVAMU	TJ Starks 6-yard rush (Luis Reyes kick) (9 plays, 67 yards, 3:29)	PVAMU 10–0
3	10:27	GRAM	Garrett Urban 46-yard field goal (12 plays, 64 yards, 4:24)	PVAMU 10–3
3	08:21	PVAMU	Chris Johnson 60-yard pass from Trazon Connley (Luis Reyes kick) (5 plays, 69 yards, 2:06)	PVAMU 17–3
3	00:58	GRAM	Lyndemian Brooks 1-yard rush (Garrett Urban kick) (3 plays, 41 yards, 0:56)	PVAMU 17–10

Statistics	Prairie View A&M	Grambling State
First downs	18	17
Total yards	370	308
Rushing yards	153	105
Passing yards	217	203
Turnovers	2	1
Time of possession	43:05	28:46

Team	Category	Player	Statistics
Prairie View A&M	Passing	Trazon Connley	8/12, 152 yards, 1 TD
Prairie View A&M	Rushing	Kristian Mosley	18 carries, 74 yards
Prairie View A&M	Receiving	Chris Johnson	3 receptions, 108 yards, 1 TD
Grambling State	Passing	Geremy Hickbottom	11/16, 113 yards, 2 INTs
Grambling State	Rushing	Lyndemian Brooks	11 carries, 61 yards
Grambling State	Receiving	Darrell Clark	6 receptions, 91 yards

=== Arkansas–Pine Bluff ===
Arkansas–Pine Bluff at Grambling State

Team	1	2	3	4	Total
• Golden Lions	7	7	28	6	48
Tigers	0	7	7	7	21

- Date: March 20, 2021
- Location: Eddie Robinson Stadium
  Grambling, LA
- Game start: 12:00 p.m. CDT
- Elapsed time: 3 hours and 15 minutes
- Game attendance: 5,105
- Game weather: 54 °F (12 °C)
- Referee: Gary Leeper

Scoring summary
1	12:14	UAPB	Jalon Thigpen 35-yard interception returned (Zach Piwniczka kick) (0 plays, 0 yards, 0:00)	UAPB 7–0
2	04:18	GRAM	CJ Russell 4-yard rush (Garrett Urban kick) (7 plays, 75 yards, 1:57)	TIE 7–7
2	03:34	UAPB	Harry Ballard III 58-yard pass from Skyler Perry (Zach Piwniczka kick)br/>(2 play, 60 yards, 0:38)	UAPB 14–7
3	13:58	UAPB	Josh Wilkes 60-yard pass from Skyler Perry (Zach Piwniczka kick) (3 plays, 60 yards, 1:02)	UAPB 21–7
3	09:29	UAPB	Mattias Clark 4-yard rush (Zach Piwniczka kick) (10 plays, 61 yards, 3:24)	UAPB 28–7
3	07:23	GRAM	Kobe' Ross 39-yard pass from Elijah Walker (Garrett Urban kick) (7 plays, 73 yards, 1:59)	UAPB 28–14
3	03:09	UAPB	Terrill McCray III 7-yard blocked punt returned (Zach Piwniczka kick) (0 plays, 0 yards, 0:00)	UAPB 35–14
3	00:48	UABP	Jeremy Brown 28-yard pass from Skyler Perry (Zach Piwniczka kick) (2 play, 36 yards, 0:52)	UAPB 42–14
4	12:00	UAPB	Jeremy Brown 31-yard pass from Skyler Perry (Zach Pwiniczka kick) (10 plays, 70 yards, 1:50)	UAPB 48–14
4	09:04	GRAM	Kash Foley 77-yard pass from Keilon Elder (Garrett Urban kick) (2 plays, 77 yards, 0:58)	UAPB 48–21

Statistics	Arkansas–Pine Bluff	Grambling State
First downs	18	16
Total yards	402	368
Rushing yards	56	87
Passing yards	346	281
Turnovers	1	1
Time of possession	27:53	32:07

Team	Category	Player	Statistics
Arkansas–Pine Bluff	Passing	Skyler Perry	18/30, 346 yards, 4 TDs, 1 INT
Arkansas–Pine Bluff	Rushing	Omar Allen Jr.	11 carries, 42 yards
Arkansas–Pine Bluff	Receiving	Josh Wilkes	6 receptions, 131 yards, 1 TD
Grambling State	Passing	Elijah Walker	13/26, 174 yards, 1 TD, 1 INT
Grambling State	Rushing	Keilon Elder	11 carries, 65 yards
Grambling State	Receiving	Kash Foley	5 receptions, 111 yards, 1 TD

=== Vs. Southern ===
Grambling State vs. Southern

Team	1	2	3	4	Total
Tigers	0	0	7	0	7
• Jaguars	14	14	14	7	49

- Date: April 17, 2021
- Location: Independence Stadium
  Shreveport, LA
- Game start: 1:30 p.m. CDT
- Elapsed time: 3 hours and 24 minutes
- Game attendance: 11,312
- Game weather: 61 °F (16 °C) • Weather: Cloudy • Wind: NNW 11 MPH
- Referee: Y. N. Meyers
- Television network: NBC Sports Network

Scoring summary
1	08:48	SOU	Ladarius Skelton 3-yard rush (Cesar Barajas kick) (12 plays, 75 yards, 4:46)	SOU 7–0
1	03:01	SOU	Craig Nelson 4-yard rush (Cesar Barajas kick) (10 plays, 57 yards, 4:55)	SOU 14–0
2	11:24	SOU	Travis Tucker 22-yard pass from John Lampley (Cesar Barajas kick)br/>(8 plays, 82 yards, 3:29)	SOU 21–0
2	00:11	SOU	Jerodd Sims 1-yard rush (Cesar Barajas kick) (5 plays, 78 yards, 3:11)	SOU 28–0
3	11:40	SOU	Ladarius Skelton 3-yard rush (Cesar Barajas kick) (6 plays, 69 yards, 3:11)	SOU 35–0
3	09:01	GRAM	Raylon Richardson 13-yard pass from Elijah Walker (Garrett Urban kick) (7 plays, 75 yards, 2:39)	SOU 35–7
3	03:22	SOU	Marquis McClain 5-yard rush (Cesar Barajas kick) (9 plays, 68 yards, 5:33)	SOU 42–7
4	13:46	SOU	Glendon McDaniels 5-yard rush (Cesar Barajas kick) (3 plays, 50 yards, 1:01)	SOU 49–7

Statistics	Grambling State	Southern
First downs	13	19
Total yards	208	520
Rushing yards	143	232
Passing yards	65	288
Turnovers	0	0
Time of possession	25:51	34:09

Team	Category	Player	Statistics
Grambling State	Passing	Elijah Walker	9/14, 65 yards, 1 TD
Grambling State	Rushing	Lyndemian Brooks	9 carries, 71 yards
Grambling State	Receiving	Raylon Richardson	3 receptions, 51 yards, 1 TD
Southern	Passing	John Lampley	8/11, 143 yards, 1 TDs
Southern	Rushing	Ladarius Skelton	7 carries, 76 yards, 2 TDs
Southern	Receiving	Ethan Howard	5 receptions, 80 yards
