= 2019 Alabama A&M Bulldogs football team =

American college football season

2019 Alabama A&M Bulldogs football
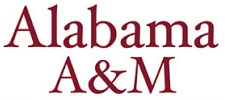
- Conference: Southwestern Athletic Conference
- East Division
- Record: 7–5 (4–3 SWAC)
- Head coach: Connell Maynor (2nd season)
- Offensive coordinator: Duane Taylor (2nd season)
- Defensive coordinator: Granville Eastman (1st season)
- Home stadium: Louis Crews Stadium

2019 Southwestern Athletic Conference football standings
	Conf.			Overall
Team	W		L	W		L
East Division
Alcorn State x$	6	–	1	9	–	4
Alabama A&M	4	–	3	7	–	5
Alabama State	4	–	3	5	–	6
Jackson State	3	–	4	4	–	8
Mississippi Valley State	1	–	6	2	–	9
West Division
Southern x	6	–	1	8	–	5
Prairie View A&M	4	–	3	6	–	5
Grambling State	4	–	3	6	–	5
Arkansas–Pine Bluff	3	–	4	6	–	5
Texas Southern	0	–	7	0	–	11
Championship: Alcorn State 39, Southern 24
$ – Conference champion; x – Division champion/co-champions

The 2019 Alabama A&M Bulldogs football team represented Alabama Agricultural and Mechanical University as a member of the East Division of the Southwestern Athletic Conference during the 2019 NCAA Division I FCS football season. Led by second-year head coach Connell Maynor, the Bulldogs compiled an overall record of 7–5 with a mark of 4–3 in conference play, tying for second place in the SWAC's East Division. The team played its home games at Louis Crews Stadium in Huntsville, Alabama .

== Coaching staff ==
Name	Position	Year at Alabama A&M	Alma Mater (Year)
Connell Maynor	Head coach	2nd	North Carolina A&T (1991)
Duane Taylor	Associate head coach/offensive coordinator	2nd	Fayetteville State (2005)
Granville Eastman	Defensive coordinator	1st	Saint Mary's (1992)
Markus Lawrence	Offensive line	2nd	Winston Salem State (2012)
Jason Mai	Quarterbacks	2nd	Southwest Minnesota State (2005)
Fred Farrier	Running backs/recruiting coordinator	1st	Holy Cross (1993)
Charles Huff	Defensive line	2nd	Presbyterian College (1985)
Kenyatta McCoy	Cornerbacks	1st	UT-Chattanooga (2001)
Chris Shelling	Outside linebackers/safeties	1st	Auburn (1995)
Bobby Turner	Tight ends/Fullbacks	1st	UT-Chattanooga (2013)
Richard Wilson	Kickers	2nd	North Alabama (Unknown)

== Preseason ==
=== Preseason polls ===
The SWAC released their preseason poll on July 16, 2019. The Bulldogs were picked to finish in second place in the East Division.

=== Preseason All–SWAC teams ===
The Bulldogs placed five players on the preseason all–SWAC teams.

- All SWAC First Team
  - TE Kendric Johnson
  - Armoni Holloway – LB

- All SWAC Second Team
  - Aqeel Glass – QB
  - Shonye Reams – OL
  - Brian Jenkins – WR

== Postseason ==
- SWAC Freshman of the Year - WR Abdul Fatai-Ibrahim
- All SWAC First Team
  - RB Jordan Bentley (BoxToRow All-American)
  - WR Abdul Fatai-Ibrahim
  - DE Marcus Cushine (BoxToRow All-American)
  - PK Spencer Corey
- All SWAC Second Team
  - QB Aqeel Glass
  - WR Zabrian Moore
  - TE Kendric Johnson
  - OL Shonye Reams
  - OL Tevoris Butler
  - LB Armoni Holloway

Bentley broke several Alabama A&M records: Single-season rushing yards, career rushing yards (3,204), single-game rushing yards (245), rushing touchdowns (18), career touchdowns (43), single-season points (122) and career points (260). Ibrahim finished the season with 1,004 receiving yards and 11 touchdowns on 59 receptions. Cushine, a 6-2 and 220-pound defensive end from Broward County, Fla., emerged this season as one of the conference's top pass rushers, leading Alabama A&M with seven sacks and 13 tackles for loss. Corey finished the season 49 of 50 on extra point attempts, and he made 5-of-9 field goal attempts, including a 44-yarder.

Glass led the SWAC in passing while setting a new Alabama A&M records with 3,600 passing yards and 32 passing touchdowns. Zabrian Moore led the SWAC in receiving with 1,057 yards and nine touchdowns on 58 receptions. Johnson finished the season with 275 yards and four touchdowns on 24 receptions. Holloway set a new Alabama A&M record with 114 tackles, averaging 9.5 tacklers per game and led the team with 14 tackles for loss.

== Schedule ==
Date	Time	Opponent	Site	TV	Result	Attendance
September 1	2:30 p.m.	vs. Morehouse*	Tom Benson Hall of Fame Stadium; Canton, OH (Black College Football Hall of Fame Classic)	NFLN	W 35–30	9,776
September 7	6:00 p.m.	Arkansas–Pine Bluff	Louis Crews Stadium; Huntsville, AL	YouTube	L 34–52	11,340
September 14	6:00 p.m.	at North Alabama*	Braly Municipal Stadium; Florence, AL	ESPN+	W 31–24	12,767
September 21	6:00 p.m.	at Samford*	Seibert Stadium; Homewood, AL	ESPN3	L 21–55	5,934
September 28	4:30 p.m.	vs. Central State (OH)*	Ladd–Peebles Stadium; Mobile, AL		W 63–20	11,590
October 5	2:00 p.m.	Texas Southern^{†}	Louis Crews Stadium; Huntsville, AL	AAMU Sports Network	W 35–28 ^{OT}	14,626
October 12	2:00 p.m.	at Grambling State*	Eddie Robinson Stadium; Grambling, LA		L 10–23	9,072
October 26	2:30 p.m.	vs. Alabama State	Legion Field; Birmingham, AL (Magic City Classic)	ESPN3	W 43-41 ^{3OT}	53,217
November 2	4:00 p.m.	at Southern	Ace W. Mumford Stadium; Baton Rouge, LA	ESPN3	L 31–35	20,344
November 9	1:00 p.m.	Jackson State	Louis Crews Stadium; Huntsville, AL	YouTube	W 48–43	5,326
November 16	2:00 p.m.	at Alcorn State	Spinks-Casem Stadium; Lorman, MS	Alcorn All Access	L 28–34	5,513
November 23	1:00 p.m.	Mississippi Valley State	Louis Crews Stadium; Huntsville, AL	YouTube	W 30–13	1,235
*Non-conference game; ^{†}Homecoming; All times are in Central time

== Game summaries ==
=== Vs. Morehouse ===
	1	2	3	4	Total
Maroon Tigers	0	10	7	13	30
Bulldogs	7	7	14	7	35

Scoring summary

Quarter	Time	Drive			Team	Scoring information	Score	
Quarter	Time	Plays	Yards	TOP	Team	Scoring information	MORE	AAMU
1	14:45	1	40	0:15	AAMU	Zabrian Moore 40-yard touchdown reception from Aqeel Glass, Spencer Corey kick good	0	7
2	8:17	7	84	3:14	MORE	Frank Bailey Jr. 59-yard touchdown reception from Michael Sims, Fernando Sdelamora kick good	7	7
2	5:59	8	66	2:17	AAMU	Jordan Bentley 1-yard touchdown run, Spencer Corey kick good	7	14
2	0:00	6	30	0:36	MORE	42-yard field goal by Fernando Sdelamora	10	14
3	11:37	6	50	1:39	AAMU	Anthony Howard 6-yard touchdown reception from Aqeel Glass, Spencer Corey kick good	10	21
3	4:28	8	87	2:55	AAMU	Kendric Johnson 43-yard touchdown reception from Aqeel Glass, Spencer Corey kick good	10	28
3	0:30	4	43	1:17	MORE	Santo Dunn 36-yard touchdown reception from Jalen Brown, Fernando Sdelamora kick good	17	28
4	11:30	5	22	2:25	MORE	Tremell Gooden 5-yard touchdown reception from Jalen Brown, Fernando Sdelamora kick good	24	28
4	1:01	8	53	4:38	MORE	Santo Dunn 1-yard touchdown run, Fernando Sdelamora kick missed	30	28
4	0:03	6	61	0:49	AAMU	Brian Jenkins Jr. 20-yard touchdown reception from Aqeel Glass, Spencer Corey kick good	30	35
"TOP" = time of possession. For other American football terms, see Glossary of American football.							30	35

=== Arkansas–Pine Bluff ===
	1	2	3	4	Total
Golden Lions	17	14	21	0	52
Bulldogs	14	0	20	0	34

=== At North Alabama ===
	1	2	3	4	Total
Bulldogs	0	0	21	10	31
Lions	9	9	3	3	24

=== At Samford ===
	1	2	3	4	Total
AAMU Bulldogs	7	7	0	7	21
SAM Bulldogs	10	21	10	14	55

=== Vs. Central State ===
	1	2	3	4	Total
Marauders	7	7	0	6	20
Bulldogs	14	28	14	7	63

=== Texas Southern ===
	1	2	3	4	OT	Total
Tigers	0	13	7	8	0	28
Bulldogs	7	7	14	0	7	35

=== At Grambling State ===
	1	2	3	4	Total
Bulldogs	0	0	10	0	10
Tigers	0	7	3	13	23

=== Vs. Alabama State ===
	1	2	3	4	OT	2OT	3OT	Total
Bulldogs	7	0	7	7	7	7	8	43
Hornets	0	21	0	0	7	7	6	41

=== At Southern ===
	1	2	3	4	Total
Bulldogs	0	7	14	10	31
Jaguars	7	7	7	14	35

=== Jackson State ===
	1	2	3	4	Total
Tigers	7	7	16	13	43
Bulldogs	3	10	7	28	48

=== At Alcorn State ===
	1	2	3	4	Total
Bulldogs	7	7	7	7	28
Braves	7	14	6	7	34

=== Mississippi Valley State ===
	1	2	3	4	Total
Delta Devils	7	0	0	6	13
Bulldogs	7	21	0	2	30
