= 2019 Alabama State Hornets football team =

American college football season

2019 Alabama State Hornets football
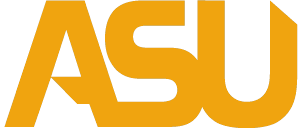
- Conference: Southwestern Athletic Conference
- East Division
- Record: 5–6 (4–3 SWAC)
- Head coach: Donald Hill-Eley (2nd season)
- Offensive coordinator: Joe Blackwell (1st season)
- Defensive coordinator: Travis Pearson (1st season)
- Home stadium: New ASU Stadium

2019 Southwestern Athletic Conference football standings
	Conf.			Overall
Team	W		L	W		L
East Division
Alcorn State x$	6	–	1	9	–	4
Alabama A&M	4	–	3	7	–	5
Alabama State	4	–	3	5	–	6
Jackson State	3	–	4	4	–	8
Mississippi Valley State	1	–	6	2	–	9
West Division
Southern x	6	–	1	8	–	5
Prairie View A&M	4	–	3	6	–	5
Grambling State	4	–	3	6	–	5
Arkansas–Pine Bluff	3	–	4	6	–	5
Texas Southern	0	–	7	0	–	11
Championship: Alcorn State 39, Southern 24
$ – Conference champion; x – Division champion/co-champions

The 2019 Alabama State Hornets football team represented Alabama State University as a member of the East Division of the Southwestern Athletic Conference (SWAC) during 2019 NCAA Division I FCS football season. Led by second-year head coach Donald Hill-Eley, the Hornets compiled an overall record of 5–6 with a mark of 4–3 in conference play, tying for second place in the SWAC East Division. Alabama State played home games at New ASU Stadium in Montgomery, Alabama.

== Preseason ==
=== Preseason polls ===
The SWAC released their preseason poll on July 16, 2019. The Hornets were picked to finish in fourth place in the East Division.

=== Preseason all–SWAC teams ===
The Hornets placed five players on the preseason all–SWAC teams.

Defense

1st team

Christian Clark – DL

Darron Johnson – LB

2nd team

Joshua Hill – DB

Specialists

1st team

Anthony Craven – P

Ezra Gray – RS

== Schedule ==
Date	Time	Opponent	Site	TV	Result	Attendance
August 29	7:00 p.m.	at UAB*	Legion Field; Birmingham, AL	ESPN+	L 19–24	39,165
September 7	5:00 p.m.	Tuskegee*	New ASU Stadium; Montgomery, AL	ASU All Access	W 38–31	27,828
September 14	5:00 p.m.	No. 9 Kennesaw State*	New ASU Stadium; Montgomery, AL	ASU All Access	L 7–42	15,887
September 21	5:00 p.m.	Grambling State	New ASU Stadium; Montgomery, AL	ASU All Access	W 23–20	17,309
October 5	2:00 p.m.	Alcorn State	New ASU Stadium; Montgomery, AL	ASU All Access	L 7–35	12,721
October 12	2:00 p.m.	at Jackson State	Mississippi Veterans Memorial Stadium; Jackson, MS	JSUTV	W 31–16	35,013
October 26	2:30 p.m.	vs. Alabama A&M	Legion Field; Birmingham, AL (Magic City Classic)	ESPN3	L 41–43 ^{3OT}	53,217
November 2	1:00 p.m.	at Mississippi Valley State	Rice–Totten Stadium; Itta Bena, MS	YouTube	W 27–0	2,967
November 9	2:00 p.m.	at Texas Southern	BBVA Compass Stadium; Houston, TX	A&T SportsNet SW	W 27–21	2,422
November 16	11:00 a.m.	at Florida State*	Doak Campbell Stadium; Tallahassee, FL	ACCRSN	L 12–49	52,857
November 28	2:00 p.m.	Prairie View A&M	New ASU Stadium; Montgomery, AL (Turkey Day Classic)	ASU All Access	L 17–20	15,252
*Non-conference game; Rankings from STATS Poll released prior to the game; All times are in Central time

== Game summaries ==
=== At UAB ===
	1	2	3	4	Total
Hornets	13	0	6	0	19
Blazers	14	10	0	0	24

=== Tuskegee ===
	1	2	3	4	Total
Golden Tigers	7	14	10	0	31
Hornets	7	13	11	7	38

=== Kennesaw State ===
	1	2	3	4	Total
No. 9 Owls	21	7	14	0	42
Hornets	0	0	7	0	7

=== Grambling State ===
	1	2	3	4	Total
Tigers	7	3	10	0	20
Hornets	3	7	7	6	23

=== Alcorn State ===
	1	2	3	4	Total
Braves	14	14	0	7	35
Hornets	0	0	7	0	7

=== At Jackson State ===
	1	2	3	4	Total
Hornets	7	7	10	7	31
Tigers	3	7	0	6	16

=== Vs. Alabama A&M ===
	1	2	3	4	OT	2OT	3OT	Total
Bulldogs	7	0	7	7	7	7	8	43
Hornets	0	21	0	0	7	7	6	41

=== At Mississippi Valley State ===
	1	2	3	4	Total
Hornets	0	14	10	3	27
Delta Devils	0	0	0	0	0

=== At Texas Southern ===
	1	2	3	4	Total
Hornets	14	13	0	0	27
Tigers	0	7	7	7	21

=== At Florida State ===
	1	2	3	4	Total
Hornets	3	3	6	0	12
Seminoles	14	7	14	14	49

=== Prairie View A&M ===
	1	2	3	4	Total
Panthers	0	14	6	0	20
Hornets	0	3	6	8	17
