= 2019 Prairie View A&M Panthers football team =

American college football season

2019 Prairie View A&M Panthers football
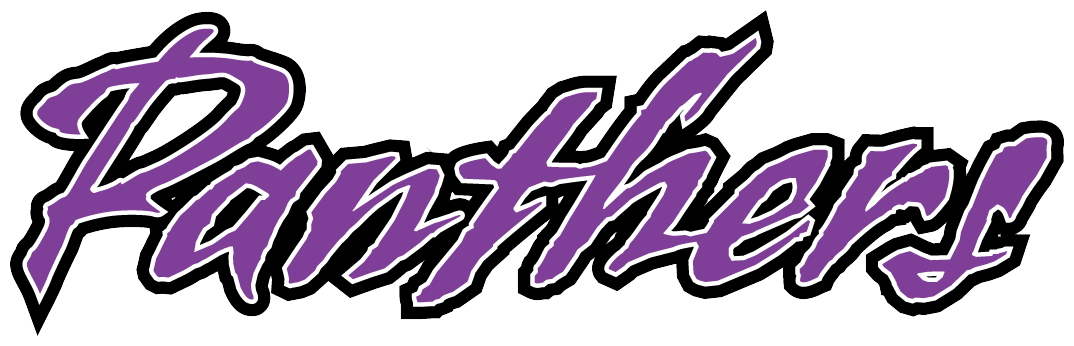
- Conference: Southwestern Athletic Conference
- West Division
- Record: 6–5 (4–3 SWAC)
- Head coach: Eric Dooley (2nd season)
- Home stadium: Panther Stadium at Blackshear Field

2019 Southwestern Athletic Conference football standings
	Conf.			Overall
Team	W		L	W		L
East Division
Alcorn State x$	6	–	1	9	–	4
Alabama A&M	4	–	3	7	–	5
Alabama State	4	–	3	5	–	6
Jackson State	3	–	4	4	–	8
Mississippi Valley State	1	–	6	2	–	9
West Division
Southern x	6	–	1	8	–	5
Prairie View A&M	4	–	3	6	–	5
Grambling State	4	–	3	6	–	5
Arkansas–Pine Bluff	3	–	4	6	–	5
Texas Southern	0	–	7	0	–	11
Championship: Alcorn State 39, Southern 24
$ – Conference champion; x – Division champion/co-champions

The 2019 Prairie View A&M Panthers football team represented Prairie View A&M University in the 2019 NCAA Division I FCS football season. The Panthers were led by second-year head coach Eric Dooley and played their home games at Panther Stadium at Blackshear Field in Prairie View, Texas as members of the West Division of the Southwestern Athletic Conference (SWAC).

== Preseason ==
=== Preseason polls ===
The SWAC released their preseason poll on July 16, 2019. The Panthers were picked to finish in second place in the West Division.

=== Preseason all–SWAC teams ===
The Tigers placed eight players on the preseason all–SWAC teams.

Offense

1st team

DeJohn Jones – OL

Tristen Wallace – WR

2nd team

Dawonya Tucker – RB

Christian Rice – OL

Danny Garza – OL

Defense

1st team

Ju'Anthony Parker – DB

2nd team

Ron Collins – DL

Specialists

2nd team

Zack Elder – K

== Schedule ==
Date	Time	Opponent	Site	TV	Result	Attendance
August 31	5:30 p.m.	at Texas Southern	BBVA Stadium; Houston, TX (Labor Day Classic)	ESPN3	W 44–23	16,407
September 7	7:00 p.m.	at Houston*	TDECU Stadium; Houston, TX	ESPN3	L 17–37	29,360
September 14	6:00 p.m.	No. 12 Nicholls*	Panther Stadium; Prairie View, TX	PVAMU SN	L 35–42	8,756
September 21	5:00 p.m.	at Alcorn State	Spinks-Casem Stadium; Lorman, MS	ESPN3	L 41–45	15,958
September 28	4:00 p.m.	vs. Grambling State	Cotton Bowl; Dallas, TX (State Fair Classic)		W 42–36	52,315
October 12	6:00 p.m.	at Southern	Ace W. Mumford Stadium; Baton Rouge, LA	ESPN3	L 28–34	16,248
October 19	2:00 p.m.	Virginia–Lynchburg*^{†}	Panther Stadium; Prairie View, TX	PVAMU SN	W 51–0	13,626
October 24	6:30 p.m.	Jackson State	Panther Stadium; Prairie View, TX	ESPNU	L 35–38 ^{2OT}	1,614
November 9	2:00 p.m.	Arkansas–Pine Bluff	Panther Stadium; Prairie View, TX	PVAMU SN	W 37–20	2,764
November 16	2:00 p.m.	Edward Waters*	Panther Stadium; Prairie View, TX	PVAMU SN	W 41–14	3,354
November 28	2:00 p.m.	at Alabama State	New ASU Stadium; Montgomery, AL	ASU All Access	W 20–17	15,252
*Non-conference game; ^{†}Homecoming; Rankings from STATS Poll released prior to the game; All times are in Central time

== Game summaries ==
=== At Texas Southern ===
Prairie View A&M at Texas Southern – Game summary

Quarter	1	2	3	4	Total
Panthers	6	17	14	7	44
Tigers	13	0	10	0	23

at BBVA Stadium, Houston, TX

- Date: August 31
- Game time: 5:30 p.m. CDT
- Game weather: 90 °F (32 °C); humid
- Game attendance: 16,407
- Referee: Marty Adams
- TV: ESPNU

Game information

First quarter

- (08:16) TXSO FG – Richard Garcia III 33-yard field goal
  Texas Southern 3–0; Drive: 5 plays, 14 yards, 1:44
- (06:14) PVAMU TD – Caleb Broach 1-yard rush, Zach Elder PAT blocked
  Prairie View A&M 6–3; Drive: 6 plays, 71 yards, 1:55
- (02:09) TXSO FG – Richard Garcia III 28-yard field goal
  Tied 6–6; Drive: 15 plays, 60 yards, 4:05
- (00:13) TXSO TD – Tren'Davian Dickson 12-yard pass from De'Andre Johnson, Richard Garcia III kick
  Texas Southern 13–6; Drive: 3 plays, 43 yards, 0:50

Second quarter

- (09:18) PVAMU TD – Dawonya Tucker 17-yard rush, Zach Elder kick
  Tied 13–13; Drive: 9 plays, 73 yards, 3:11
- (03:19) PVAMU TD – Dawonya Tucker 66-yard rush, Zach Elder kick
  Prairie View A&M 20–13; Drive: 2 plays, 75 yards, 0:34
- (00:00) PVAMU FG – Zach Elder 23-yard field goal
  Prairie View A&M 23–13; Drive: 7 plays, 27 yards, 2:30

Third quarter

- (09:41) PVAMU TD – Kalen Riles 10-yard pass from Jalen Morton, Zach Elder kick
  Prairie View A&M 30–13; Drive: 14 plays, 65 yards, 5:19
- (02:37) TXSO FG – Richard Garcia III 21-yard field goal
  Prairie View A&M 30–16; Drive: 11 plays, 37 yards, 3:34
- (01:48) PVAMU TD – Tony Mullins 48-yard pass from Jalen Morton, Zach Elder kick
  Prairie View A&M 37–16; Drive: 2 plays, 51 yards, 0:51
- (00:15) TXSO TD – Chris Long 40-yard pass from DeAndre Johnson, Richard Garcia III kick
  Prairie View A&M 37–23; Drive: 5 plays, 68 yards, 1:26

Fourth quarter

- (14:50) PVAU TD – Dawonya Tucker 58-yard rush, Zach Elder kick
  Prairie View A&M 44–23; Drive: 3 plays, 72 yards, 0:25

Top passers

- PVAMU – Jalen Morton – 24/42, 350 yards, 2 TD, INT
- TXSO – De'Andre Johnson – 22/37, 259 yards, 2 TD, INT

Top rushers

- PVAMU – Dawonya Tucker – 11 carries, 188 yards, 3 TD
- TXSO – Ladarius Owens – 15 carries, 95 yards

Top receivers

- PVAMU – Tony Mullins – 6 receptions, 141 yards, TD
- TXSO – Donnie Corley – 7 receptions, 92 yards

Statistics	Prairie View A&M	Texas Southern
First downs	23	23
Total yards	615	423
Rushing yards	265	164
Passing yards	350	259
Turnovers	1	2
Time of possession	29:18	30:42

=== At Houston ===
	1	2	3	4	Total
Panthers	3	7	0	7	17
Cougars	24	10	3	0	37

=== Nicholls ===
	1	2	3	4	Total
No. 12 Colonels	6	0	29	7	42
Panthers	0	21	0	14	35

=== At Alcorn State ===
	1	2	3	4	Total
Panthers	0	19	15	7	41
Braves	17	7	7	14	45

=== Vs. Grambling State ===
	1	2	3	4	Total
Panthers	14	17	0	11	42
Tigers	17	6	0	13	36

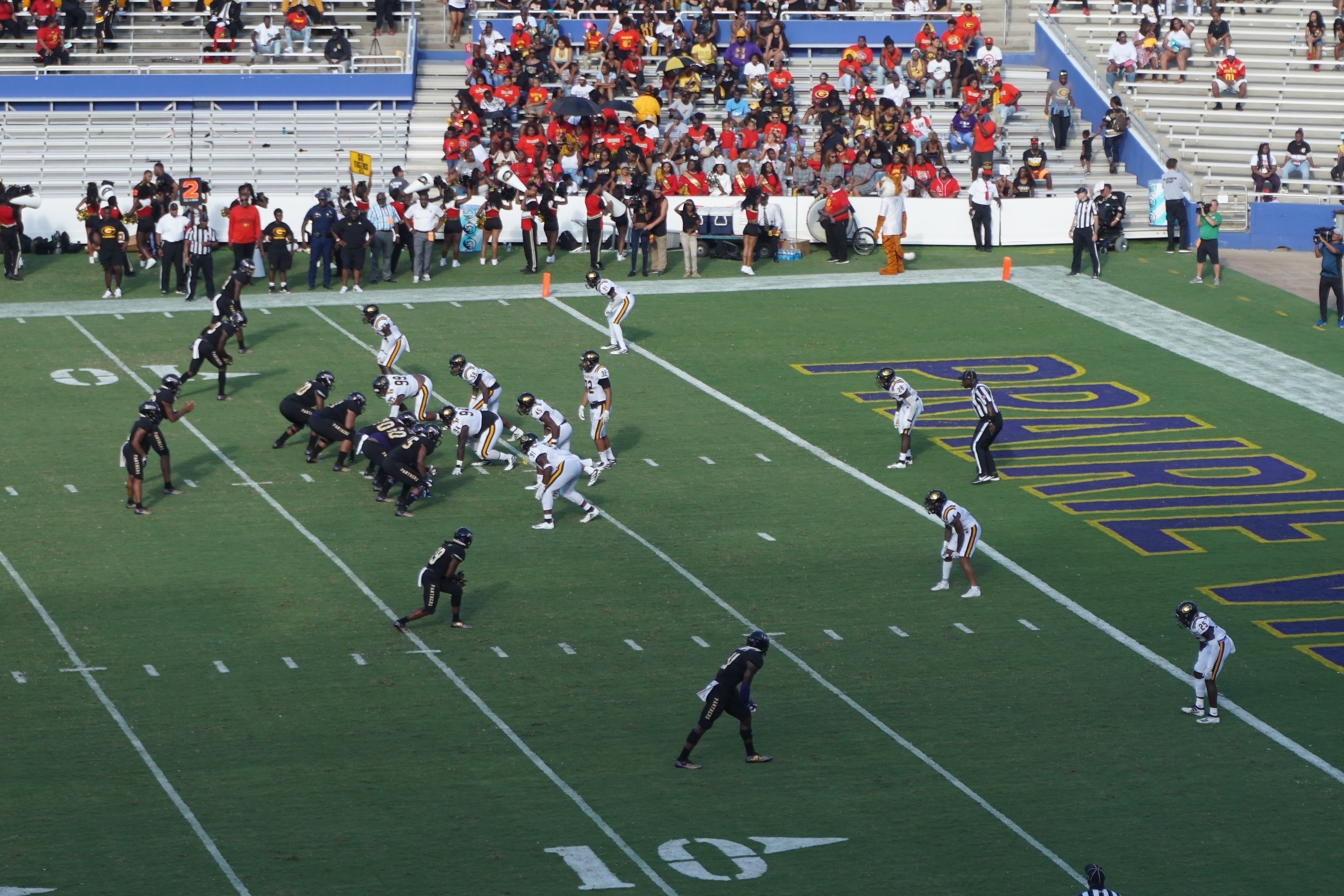
Prairie View in action against Grambling

=== At Southern ===
	1	2	3	4	Total
Panthers	7	0	7	14	28
Jaguars	7	7	3	17	34

=== Virginia–Lynchburg ===
	1	2	3	4	Total
Dragons	0	0	0	0	0
Panthers	13	10	7	21	51

=== Jackson State ===
	1	2	3	4	OT	2OT	Total
Tigers	6	16	3	3	7	3	38
Panthers	7	7	0	14	7	0	35

=== Arkansas–Pine Bluff ===
	1	2	3	4	Total
Golden Lions	0	0	7	13	20
Panthers	0	16	7	14	37

=== Edward Waters ===
	1	2	3	4	Total
Tigers	7	0	7	0	14
Panthers	7	20	0	14	41

=== At Alabama State ===
	1	2	3	4	Total
Panthers	0	14	6	0	20
Hornets	0	3	6	8	17
