= 2019 Mississippi Valley State Delta Devils football team =

American college football season

2019 Mississippi Valley State Delta Devils football
- Conference: Southwestern Athletic Conference
- East Division
- Record: 2–9 (1–6 SWAC)
- Head coach: Vincent Dancy (2nd season)
- Offensive coordinator: Maurice Flowers (2nd season)
- Defensive coordinator: Derek Welch (2nd season)
- Home stadium: Rice–Totten Stadium

2019 Southwestern Athletic Conference football standings
	Conf.			Overall
Team	W		L	W		L
East Division
Alcorn State x$	6	–	1	9	–	4
Alabama A&M	4	–	3	7	–	5
Alabama State	4	–	3	5	–	6
Jackson State	3	–	4	4	–	8
Mississippi Valley State	1	–	6	2	–	9
West Division
Southern x	6	–	1	8	–	5
Prairie View A&M	4	–	3	6	–	5
Grambling State	4	–	3	6	–	5
Arkansas–Pine Bluff	3	–	4	6	–	5
Texas Southern	0	–	7	0	–	11
Championship: Alcorn State 39, Southern 24
$ – Conference champion; x – Division champion/co-champions

The 2019 Mississippi Valley State Delta Devils football team represented Mississippi Valley State University as a member of the East Division of the Southwestern Athletic Conference (SWAC) during the 2019 NCAA Division I FCS football season. Led by second-year head coach Vincent Dancy, the Delta Devils compiled an overall record of 2–9 and a mark of 1–6 in conference play, placing last out of five teams in the SWAC's East Division. Mississippi Valley State played home games at Rice–Totten Stadium in Itta Bena, Mississippi.

== Preseason ==
=== Preseason polls ===
The SWAC released their preseason poll on July 16, 2019. The Delta Devils were picked to finish in fifth place in the East Division.

=== Preseason all-SWAC teams ===
The Delta Devils did not place any players on the preseason all-SWAC teams.

== Schedule ==
Date	Time	Opponent	Site	TV	Result	Attendance
August 31	6:00 p.m.	at Tennessee State*	Nissan Stadium; Nashville, TN	ESPN+	L 20–26	13,458
September 7	6:00 p.m.	at Lamar*	Provost Umphrey Stadium; Beaumont, TX	ESPN+	L 20–23 ^{OT}	7,285
September 21	6:00 p.m.	Bethune–Cookman*	Rice–Totten Stadium; Itta Bena, MS	Youtube	L 6–22	6,487
September 28	6:00 p.m.	at Alcorn State	Spinks-Casem Stadium; Lorman, MS	Alcorn All Access	L 19–45	7,593
October 5	3:00 p.m.	Virginia–Lynchburg*	Rice–Totten Stadium; Itta Bena, MS	Youtube	W 31–23	3,289
October 12	1:00 p.m.	at Arkansas–Pine Bluff	Simmons Bank Field; Pine Bluff, AR	UAPB All Access	L 6–38	6,225
October 19	2:00 p.m.	Jackson State	Rice–Totten Stadium; Itta Bena, MS	ESPN3	L 28–31 ^{OT}	9,093
October 26	1:00 p.m.	Texas Southern	Rice–Totten Stadium; Itta Bena, MS	Youtube	W 35–14	2,679
November 2	1:00 p.m.	Alabama State	Rice–Totten Stadium; Itta Bena, MS	Youtube	L 0–27	2,967
November 16	1:00 p.m.	Grambling State	Rice–Totten Stadium; Itta Bena, MS	Youtube	L 0–40	1,978
November 23	1:00 p.m.	at Alabama A&M	Louis Crews Stadium; Huntsville, AL	Youtube	L 13–30	1,235
*Non-conference game; All times are in Central time

== Game summaries ==
=== At Tennessee State ===
	1	2	3	4	Total
Delta Devils	0	6	7	7	20
Tigers	7	3	10	6	26

=== At Lamar ===
	1	2	3	4	OT	Total
Delta Devils	0	7	6	7	0	20
Cardinals	0	7	3	10	3	23

=== Bethune–Cookman ===
	1	2	3	4	Total
Wildcats	2	13	0	7	22
Delta Devils	6	0	0	0	6

=== At Alcorn State ===
	1	2	3	4	Total
Delta Devils	0	13	6	0	19
Braves	7	14	17	7	45

=== Virginia–Lynchburg ===
	1	2	3	4	Total
Dragons	0	7	7	9	23
Delta Devils	7	10	7	7	31

=== At Arkansas–Pine Bluff ===
	1	2	3	4	Total
Delta Devils	6	0	0	0	6
Golden Lions	7	14	7	10	38

=== Jackson State ===
	1	2	3	4	OT	Total
Tigers	0	7	13	8	3	31
Delta Devils	7	14	0	7	0	28

=== Texas Southern ===
	1	2	3	4	Total
Tigers	7	0	0	7	14
Delta Devils	0	13	6	16	35

=== Alabama State ===
	1	2	3	4	Total
Hornets	0	14	10	3	27
Delta Devils	0	0	0	0	0

=== Grambling State ===
	1	2	3	4	Total
Tigers	14	3	10	13	40
Delta Devils	0	0	0	0	0

=== At Alabama A&M ===
	1	2	3	4	Total
Delta Devils	7	0	0	6	13
Bulldogs	7	21	0	2	30
