= 2019 Southern Jaguars football team =

American college football season

2019 Southern Jaguars football
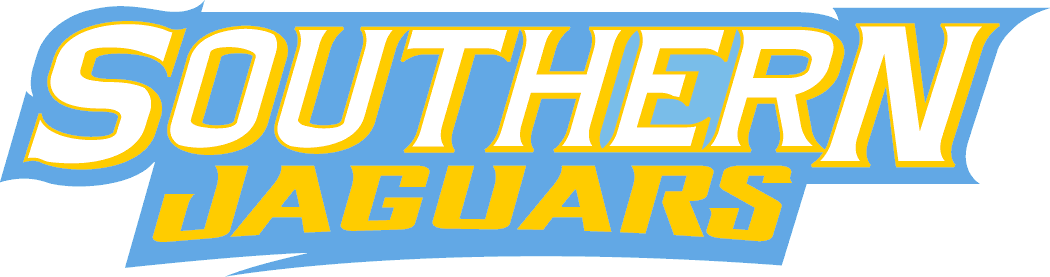

SWAC West Division champion

SWAC Championship Game, L 24–39 vs. Alcorn State
- Conference: Southwestern Athletic Conference
- West Division
- Record: 8–5 (6–1 SWAC)
- Head coach: Dawson Odums (7th season)
- Offensive coordinator: Chennis Berry (7th season)
- Defensive coordinator: Lionel Washington (1st season)
- Home stadium: Ace W. Mumford Stadium

2019 Southwestern Athletic Conference football standings
	Conf.			Overall
Team	W		L	W		L
East Division
Alcorn State x$	6	–	1	9	–	4
Alabama A&M	4	–	3	7	–	5
Alabama State	4	–	3	5	–	6
Jackson State	3	–	4	4	–	8
Mississippi Valley State	1	–	6	2	–	9
West Division
Southern x	6	–	1	8	–	5
Prairie View A&M	4	–	3	6	–	5
Grambling State	4	–	3	6	–	5
Arkansas–Pine Bluff	3	–	4	6	–	5
Texas Southern	0	–	7	0	–	11
Championship: Alcorn State 39, Southern 24
$ – Conference champion; x – Division champion/co-champions

The 2019 Southern Jaguars football team represented Southern University in the 2019 NCAA Division I FCS football season. The Jaguars were led by seventh-year head coach Dawson Odums and played their home games at Ace W. Mumford Stadium in Baton Rouge, Louisiana as members of the West Division of the Southwestern Athletic Conference (SWAC).

== Preseason ==
=== Preseason polls ===
The SWAC released their preseason poll on July 16, 2019. The Jaguars were picked to finish in first place in the West Division.

=== Preseason all–SWAC teams ===
The Jaguars placed six players on the preseason all–SWAC teams.

Offense

1st team

Jodeci Harris – OL

2nd team

Devon Benn – RB

Jaylon Brinson – OL

Jeremias Houston – TE

Defense

1st team

Jordan Lewis – DL

2nd team

Montavious Gaines – DB

== Roster ==
2019 Southern Jaguars football team roster
Players
Coaches
Offense

Pos.	#	Name	Class
WR	4	Hunter Register	Sr
WR	6	Jamar Washington	Jr
QB	8	Ladarius Skelton	Jr
RB	9	Devon Benn	Jr
QB	11	John Lampley	Jr
QB	12	Glendon McDaniel	Jr
RB	15	Darbbeon Profit	Jr
RB	20	Jamarqueza Mims	Sr
RB	24	Carlos Stephens	Jr
WR	25	Cameron Mackey	Jr
RB	27	Shontega Thomas	Fr
WR	28	Christopher Chaney	Jr
TE	35	Reggie Wilson	So
RB	39	Jordan Davis	Sr
OL	58	Jaylon Brinson	Sr
OL	60	Bernard Childs	So
OL	62	Dallas Black	Fr
C	63	Christopher Nash	Fr
OL	64	Jeremiah Abby	Sr
OL	65	Johnathan Bishop	Jr
OL	66	Mason Sims	Jr
OL	67	August Walker	Sr
OL	69	Elijah Jordan	Jr
OL	70	Kennedy Madison	Fr
OL	71	Maurice Campbell	Jr
OL	74	Garrick Breaux	So
OT	75	Brian Williams	Jr
OL	77	Jodeci Harris	Sr
OT	78	J'Atrye Carter	Jr
WR	80	Norman Price	Fr
WR	81	Christian Branch	Jr
WR	83	Jamel Byrd	So
WR	84	Kobe Hartman	So
WR	86	Daelon Richardson	Sr
TE	88	Jeremias Houston	Sr
WR	89	Tyler Brown	Sr

Defense

Pos.	#	Name	Class
LB	1	Calvin Lunkins	Sr
DB	3	Elijah Small	Sr
DB	5	Montavius Gaines	Sr
DB	13	Arvin Huff	Sr
DB	16	Kaycee Ntukogu	Jr
DB	17	Andre Augustine	Sr
LB	18	Benjamin Harris	Sr
DB	22	Glen Brown, III	So
DB	23	Chase Foster	Jr
DB	26	Torriando Sims, II	So
DB	29	Robert Rhem	So
S	31	Jakobi Jones	Jr
DB	33	Jakoby Pappillion	Jr
LB	34	Keyshawn Akers	Jr
S	37	Kordell Caldwell	Jr
LB	40	Jordan Williams	Sr
DL	42	Joe Davis	Sr
LB	46	Darrell Hardnett	Jr
LB	47	Caleb Carter	Sr
LB	48	Darrell Lewis	Sr
LB	49	Brad Porter	Sr
LB	50	Kyle McGregor	Sr
LB	51	Jordan Lewis	So
LB	55	Kennen Tate	Fr
LB	57	Landon Auzenne	Jr
DL	79	Jamil Abdul-aziz	Jr
DL	90	Dylan Walker	Jr
DT	91	Dakavion Champion	Sr
DL	92	Colyn Givens	So
DL	93	CeaJae Bryant	Sr
DL	94	Christopher Thomas	So
DL	95	Tyran Nash	Sr
LB	96	Jalen Ivy	Jr
DL	96	Robert Square III	Fr
DT	99	Hunter Clay	Jr

Special teams

Pos.	#	Name	Class
K	30	Cesar Barajas	Jr
K, P	85	Taylor Merritt	Sr

Head coach

- Dawson Odums (North Carolina Central)

Coordinators/assistant coaches

- Chennis Berry (Savannah State)
  Offensive coordinator, offensive line
- Lionel Washington (Tulane)
  Defensive coordinator, cornerbacks
- Wayne Cordova (McNeese State)
  Safeties
- Macander Dieudonne (Webber International)
  Tight ends
- Chris Coleman (North Carolina State)
  Wide receivers
- Skyler Jones (Southern)
  Defensive line
- Matt Leone (Webber International)
  Quarterbacks
- Ashton Warner (Bethany)
  Running backs

Legend

- (C) Team captain
- (S) Suspended
- (I) Ineligible
- Injured
- Redshirt

Roster
Last update: April 25, 2020

== Schedule ==
Date	Time	Opponent	Site	TV	Result	Attendance	Source
August 31	6:00 p.m.	at McNeese State*	Cowboy Stadium; Lake Charles, LA	ESPN+	L 28–34	20,437	
September 7	11:00 a.m.	at Memphis*	Liberty Bowl Memorial Stadium; Memphis, TN	ESPN3	L 24–55	34,487	
September 14	6:00 p.m.	Edward Waters*	Ace W. Mumford Stadium; Baton Rouge, LA		W 61–0	14,377	
September 21	6:00 p.m.	at Florida A&M*	Bragg Memorial Stadium; Tallahassee, FL	ESPN3/ESPN+	L 21–27		
September 28	6:00 p.m.	at Arkansas–Pine Bluff	Simmons Bank Field; Pine Bluff, AR	ESPN3	W 31–7	6,863	
October 12	6:00 p.m.	Prairie View A&M	Ace W. Mumford Stadium; Baton Rouge, LA	ESPN3	W 34–28	16,248	
October 19	2:00 p.m.	vs. Texas Southern	Cotton Bowl; Dallas, TX (State Fair Showdown)		W 28–21	5,136	
October 26	2:00 p.m.	at Alcorn State	Spinks-Casem Stadium; Lorman, MS	Braves All-Access	L 13–27	15,993	
November 2	4:00 p.m.	Alabama A&M^{†}	Ace W. Mumford Stadium; Baton Rouge, LA	ESPN3	W 35–31		
November 9	4:00 p.m.	Virginia–Lynchburg*	Ace W. Mumford Stadium; Baton Rouge, LA		W 58–7		
November 16	2:00 p.m.	at Jackson State	Mississippi Veterans Memorial Stadium; Jackson, MS	Facebook	W 40–34		
November 30	4:00 p.m.	vs. Grambling State	Mercedes-Benz Superdome; New Orleans, LA (Bayou Classic)	NBCSN	W 30–28	70,112	
December 7	3:00 p.m.	at Alcorn State	Jack Spinks Stadium; Lorman, MS (SWAC Championship Game)	ESPNU	L 24–39		
*Non-conference game; ^{†}Homecoming; Rankings from STATS Poll released prior to the game; All times are in Central time

== Game summaries ==
=== At McNeese State ===
Statistics	Southern	McNeese State
First downs	29	18
Total yards	342	303
Rushing yards	103	154
Passing yards	239	149
Turnovers	5	0
Time of possession	26:35	33:25

Southern at McNeese State – Game summary

Quarter	1	2	3	4	Total
Jaguars	7	7	0	14	28
Cowboys	7	10	7	10	34

at Cowboy Stadium, Lake Charles, LA

- Date: August 31
- Game time: 6:00 p.m. CDT
- Game weather: 93 °F (34 °C); fair skies
- Game attendance: 20,437
- Referee: C. Watson
- TV: ESPN+

Game information

First quarter

- (06:11) MCNS TD – J'Cobi Skinner 1-yard rush, Noah Anderson kick
  McNeese State 7–0; Drive: 6 plays, 29 yards, 1:41
- (03:22) SOU TD – Timothy Bedford 33-yard pass from Ladarius Skelton, Martel Fontenot kick
  Tied 7–7; Drive: 7 plays, 75 yards, 2:49

Second quarter

- (14:52) SOU TD – Hunter Register 43-yard pass from Ladarius Skelton, Martel Fontenot kick
  Southern 14–7; Drive: 4 plays, 79 yards, 1:06
- (09:38) MCNS FG – Noah Anderson 37-yard field goal
  Southern 14–10; Drive: 15 plays, 57 yards, 5:08
- (01:49) MCNS TD – Trevor Begue 12-yard pass from Cody Orgeron, Noah Anderson kick
  McNeese State 17–14; Drive: 3 plays, 13 yards, 3:51

Third quarter

- (10:12) MCNS TD – Trevor Begue 24-yard pass from Cody Orgeron, Noah Anderson kick
  McNeese State 24–14; Drive: 7 plays, 36 yards, 2:59

Fourth quarter

- (10:38) MCNS FG – Noah Anderson 29-yard field goal
  McNeese State 27–14; Drive: 8 plays, 50 yards, 3:31
- (05:25) MCNS TD – Elijah Mack 3-yard rush, Noah Anderson kick
  McNeese State 34–14; Drive: 11 plays, 76 yards, 4:13
- (03:41) SOU TD – Hunter Register 17-yard pass from Glendon McDaniel, Martel Fontenot kick
  McNeese 34–21; Drive: 4 plays, 75 yards, 1:44
- (00:32) SOU TD – Glendon McDaniel 1-yard rush, Martel Fontenot kick
  McNeese State 34–28; Drive: 10 plays, 99 yards, 1:59

Top passers

- SOU – Glendon McDaniel – 11/19, 135 yards, TD
- MCNS – Cody Orgeron – 15/22, 147 yards, 2 TD

Top rushers

- SOU – Devon Benn – 11 carries, 33 yards
- MCNS – Elijah Mack – 12 carries, 45 yards, TD

Top receivers

- SOU – Hunter Register – 4 receptions, 82 yards, 2 TD
- MCNS – Cyron Sutton – 3 receptions, 51 yards

=== At Memphis ===
Statistics	Southern	Memphis
First downs	14	23
Total yards	258	575
Rushing yards	168	177
Passing yards	90	398
Turnovers	0	1
Time of possession	29:02	30:58

Southern at Memphis – Game summary

Quarter	1	2	3	4	Total
Jaguars	7	10	7	0	24
Tigers	17	10	21	7	55

at Liberty Bowl Memorial Stadium, Memphis, TN

- Date: September 7
- Game time: 11:00 a.m. CDT
- Game weather: 84 °F (29 °C); calm, sunny
- Game attendance: 34,487
- Referee: Edwin Lee
- TV: ESPN3

Game information

First quarter

- (13:28) SOU TD – Jamar Washington 7-yard rush, Martel Fontenot kick
  Southern 7–0; Drive: 5 plays, 75 yards, 1:32
- (11:29) MEM FG – Riley Patterson 23-yard field goal
  Southern 7–3; Drive: 6 plays, 66 yards, 1:55
- (09:38) MEM TD – Antonio Gibson 55-yard pass from Brady White, Riley Patterson kick
  Memphis 10–7; Drive: 3 plays, 55 yards, 0:48
- (00:30) MEM TD – Keith Brown, Jr. 27-yard blocked punt returned, Riley Patterson kick
  Memphis 17–7; Drive: 8 plays, 29 yards, 5:22

Second quarter

- (05:22) SOU TD – Jeremias Houston 4-yard pass from Ladarius Skelton, Martel Fontenot kick
  Memphis 17–14; Drive: 17 plays, 75 yards, 10:08
- (03:46) MEM TD – Kenneth Gainwell 46-yard rush, Riley Patterson kick
  Memphis 24–14; Drive: 4 plays, 60 yards, 1:31
- (01:07) SOU FG – Martel Fontenot 34-yard field goal
  Memphis 24–17; Drive: 9 plays, 58 yards, 2:39
- (00:02) MEM FG – Riley Patterson 49-yard field goal
  Memphis 27–17; Drive: 7 plays, 34 yards, 1:05

Third quarter

- (10:03) MEM TD – Kylan Watkins 6-yard rush, Riley Patterson kick
  Memphis 34–17; Drive: 12 plays, 64 yards, 4:53
- (04:51) SOU TD – Jordan Lewis 74-yard fumble returned, Martel Fontenot kick
  Memphis 34–24; Drive: 9 plays, 59 yards, 3:41
- (02:31) MEM TD – Kenneth Gainwell 1-yard rush, Riley Patterson kick
  Memphis 41–24; Drive: 5 plays, 65 yards, 2:16
- (00:36) MEM TD – Kenneth Gainwell 21-yard pass from Brady White, Riley Patterson kick
  Memphis 48–24; Drive: 1 play, 21 yards, 0:07

Fourth quarter

- (08:46) MEM TD – Rodrigues Clark 10-yard rush, Riley Patterson kick
  Memphis 55–24; Drive: 11 plays, 75 yards, 5:19

Top passers

- SOU – Ladarius Skelton – 7/15, 86 yards, TD
- MEM – Brady White – 17/21, 337 yards, 2 TD

Top rushers

- SOU – Ladarius Skelton – 15 carries, 75 yards
- MEM – Kenneth Gainwell – 16 carries, 85 yards, 2 TD

Top receivers

- SOU – Hunter Register – 2 receptions, 46 yards
- MEM – Damonte Coxie – 6 receptions, 112 yards

=== Edward Waters ===
Statistics	Edward Waters	Southern
First downs	15	32
Total yards	263	489
Rushing yards	78	407
Passing yards	185	82
Turnovers	4	0
Time of possession	28:21	31:39

Edward Waters at Southern – Game summary

Quarter	1	2	3	4	Total
Tigers	7	10	7	0	24
Jaguars	17	10	21	7	55

at A. W. Mumford Stadium, Baton Rouge, LA

- Date: September 14
- Game time: 6:00 p.m. CDT
- Game weather: 90 °F (32 °C);
- Game attendance: 14,377
- Referee: Jesse Harris

Game information

First quarter

- (12:10) SOU TD – Devon Benn 3-yard rush, Martel Fontenot kick
  Southern 3–0; Drive: 4 plays, 15 yards, 1:08
- (08:55) SOU TD – Ladarius Skelton 13-yard rush, Martel Fontenot kick
  Southern 10–0; Drive: 8 plays, 54 yards, 2:14
- (08:35) SOU SF – Team Safety
  Southern 16–0; Drive: 0 plays, 0 yards, 0:00

Second quarter

- (12:57) SOU FG – Martel Fontenot 33-yard field goal
  Southern 19–0; Drive: 6 plays, 36 yards, 2:07
- (12:07) SOU TD – Christopher Chaney 3-yard rush, Cesar Barajas kick
  Southern 26–0; Drive: 3 plays, 28 yards, 0:42
- (09:45) SOU TD – Devon Benn 3-yard rush, Cesar Barajas kick
  Southern 33–0; Drive: 1 play, 6 yards, 0:05
- (00:52) SOU TD – Devon Benn 1-yard rush, Cesar Barajas kick
  Southern 40–0; Drive: 11 plays, 94 yards, 5:02

Third quarter

- (07:21) SOU TD – Jordan Lewis 95-yard interception returned, Cesar Barajas kick
  Southern 47–0; Drive: 0 plays, 00 yards, 0:00

Fourth quarter

- (13:53) SOU TD – Glendon McDaniel 16-yard rush, Cesar Barajas kick
  Southern 54–0; Drive: 7 plays, 72 yards, 2:50
- (03:41) SOU TD – Darbbeon Profit 5-yard rush, Martel Fontenot kick
  Southern 61–0; Drive: 12 plays, 95 yards, 8:36

Top passers

- EWC – Jayshawn Francis – 12/23, 107 yards, 2 INT
- SOU – Ladarius Skelton – 10/19, 64 yards

Top rushers

- EWC – Eric Stowers – 10 carries, 51 yards
- SOU – Devon Benn – 17 carries, 120 yards, 3 TD

Top receivers

- EWC – Uveekie Fields – 5 receptions, 47 yards
- SOU – Cameron Mackey – 4 receptions, 25 yards

=== At Florida A&M ===
Statistics	Southern	Florida A&M
First downs	15	24
Total yards	256	433
Rushing yards	69	78
Passing yards	187	355
Turnovers	2	1
Time of possession	26:42	33:18

Southern at Florida A&M – Game summary

Quarter	1	2	3	4	Total
Jaguars	0	7	7	7	21
Rattlers	17	2	0	8	27

at Bragg Memorial Stadium, Tallahassee, FL

- Date: September 21
- Game time: 5:00 p.m. CDT
- Game weather: 85 °F (29 °C); partly cloudy
- Game attendance: 27,191
- Referee: Jason Soistman

Game information

First quarter

- (10:02) FAMU TD – George Webb 26-yard pass from Ryan Stanley, Yahia Aly kick
  Florida A&M 7–0; Drive: 8 plays, 87 yards, 3:25
- (09:54) FAMU SF – Derrick Mayweather safety
  Florida A&M 9–0; Drive: 0 plays, 0 yards, 0:00
- (02:17) FAMU TD – Azende Rey 2-yard rush, Chis Faddoul two-point conversion rush
  Florida A&M 17–0; Drive: 5 plays, 60 yards, 2:26

Second quarter

- (08:14) SOU TD – Glendon McDaniel 1-yard rush, Martel Fontenot kick
  Florida A&M 17–7; Drive: 10 plays, 99 yards, 5:07
- (03:51) FAMU SF – Team Safety
  Florida A&M 19–7; Drive: 0 plays, 0 yards, 0:00

Third quarter

- (03:02) SOU TD – Jamar Washington 23-yard pass from Ladarius Skelton, Martel Fontenot kick
  Florida A&M 19–14; Drive: 7 plays, 75 yards, 2:46

Fourth quarter

- (14:53) SOU TD – Ladarius Skelton 9-yard rush, Martel Fontenot kick
  Southern 21–19; Drive: 8 plays, 40 yards, 2:56
- (03:32) FAMU TD – Xavier Smith 17-yard pass from Ryan Stanley, Azende Rey two-point conversion pass to Kamari Young
  Florida A&M 27–21; Drive: 9 plays, 97 yards, 4:31

Top passers

- SOU – Ladarius Skelton – 11/18, 114 yards, TD
- FAMU – Ryan Stanley – 24/39, 355 yards, 2 TD, INT

Top rushers

- SOU – Devon Benn – 9 carries, 39 yards
- FAMU – Davonne Kendrick – 10 carries, 36 yards

Top receivers

- SOU – Jamar Washington – 5 receptions, 109 yards, TD
- FAMU – Xavier Smith – 9 receptions, 201 yards, TD

=== At Arkansas–Pine Bluff ===
Statistics	Southern	Arkansas–Pine Bluff
First downs	26	22
Total yards	426	336
Rushing yards	269	61
Passing yards	157	275
Turnovers	2	4
Time of possession	34:58	25:02

Southern at Arkansas–Pine Bluff – Game summary

Quarter	1	2	3	4	Total
Jaguars	14	0	7	10	31
Golden Lions	0	7	0	0	7

at Golden Lion Stadium, Pine Bluff, AR

- Date: September 28
- Game time: 6:00 p.m. CDT
- Game attendance: 6,863
- Referee: Jesse Harris
- TV: ESPN3

Game information

First quarter

- (03:46) SOU TD – Ladarius Skelton 4-yard rush, Martel Fontenot kick
  Southern 7–0; Drive: 12 plays, 83 yards, 4:20
- (00:40) SOU TD – Jarod Sims 3-yard rush, Martel Fontenot kick
  Southern 14–0; Drive: 6 plays, 34 yards, 2:15

Second quarter

- (12:14) UAPB TD – Omar Allen 13-yard rush, Zack Piwniczka kick
  Southern 14–7; Drive: 3 plays, 25 yards, 0:50

Third quarter

- (03:48) SOU TD – Ladarius Skelton 19-yard rush, Martel Fontenot kick
  Southern 21–7; Drive: 7 plays, 55 yards, 2:40

Fourth quarter

- (08:17) SOU TD – Ladarius Skelton 5-yard rush, Martel Fontenot kick
  Southern 28–7; Drive: 11 plays, 95 yards, 6:03
- (01:14) SOU FG – Martel Fontenot 46-yard field goal
  Southern 31–7; Drive: 10 plays, 32 yards, 4:30

Top passers

- SOU – Ladarius Skelton – 17/25, 157 yards, 2 INT
- UAPB – Shannon Patrick – 16/26, 159 yards, 3 INT

Top rushers

- SOU – Christopher Chaney – 12 carries, 107 yards
- UAPB – Taeyler Porter – 19 carries, 59 yards

Top receivers

- SOU – Timothy Bedford – 9 receptions, 83 yards
- UAPB – Dejuan Miller – 6 receptions, 87 yards

=== Prairie View A&M ===
Statistics	Prairie View A&M	Southern
First downs	18	22
Total yards	455	334
Rushing yards	168	238
Passing yards	287	96
Turnovers	1	2
Time of possession	25:50	34:10

Prairie View A&M at Southern – Game summary

Quarter	1	2	3	4	Total
Panthers	7	0	7	14	28
Jaguars	7	7	3	17	34

at A. W. Mumford Stadium, Baton Rouge, LA

- Date: October 12
- Game time: 6:00 p.m. CDT
- Game weather: 69 °F (21 °C)
- Game attendance: 16,248
- Referee: Marty Adams
- TV: ESPN3

Game information

First quarter

- (11:48) SOU TD – Jamar Washington 11-yard rush, Martel Fontenot kick
  Southern 7–0; Drive: 8 plays, 53 yards, 3:12
- (08:05) PVAMU TD – Kalen Riles 26-yard pass from Jalen Morton, Amaury Martinez kick
  Tied 7–7; Drive: 7 plays, 75 yards, 3:43

Second quarter

- (11:15) SOU TD – Hunter Register 3-yard pass from Ladarius Skelton, Martel Fontenot kick
  Southern 14–7; Drive: 9 plays, 75 yards, 4:34

Third quarter

- (08:09) PVAMU TD – Jaylen Harris 33-yard interception returned, Amaury Martinez kick
  STied 14–14; Drive: 0 plays, 0 yards, 0:00
- (02:17) SOU FG – Martel Fontenot 44-yard field goal
  Southern 17–14; Drive: 14 plays, 64 yards, 5:47

Fourth quarter

- (13:00) SOU TD – Ladarius Skelton 5-yard rush, Martel Fontenot kick
  Southern 24–14; Drive: 5 plays, 17 yards, 2:19
- (10:32) PVAMU TD – Jalen Morton 47-yard rush, Amaury Martinez kick
  Southern 24–21; Drive: 6 plays, 75 yards, 2:28
- (08:57) SOU TD – Devon Benn 29-yard rush, Martel Fontenot kick
  Southern 31–21; Drive: 3 plays, 60 yards, 1:25
- (07:50) PVAMU – Tony Mullins 5-yard rush, Martel Fontenot kick
  Southern 31–28; Drive: 3 plays, 75 yards, 1:07
- (01:59) SOU FG – Martel Fontenot 29-yard field goal
  Southern 34–28; Drive: 10 plays, 19 yards, 5:41

Top passers

- PVAMU – Jalen Morton – 17/31, 287 yards, TD, INT
- SOU – Ladarius Skelton – 11/20, 96 yards, TD, 2 INT

Top rushers

- PVAMU – Jalen Morton – 12 carries, 133 yards, TD
- SOU – Devon Benn – 15 carries, 87 yards, TD

Top receivers

- PVAMU – Kalen Riles – 2 reception, 100 yards, TD
- SOU – Timothy Bedford – 4 receptions, 71 yards

=== Vs. Texas Southern ===
Statistics	Texas Southern	Southern
First downs	22	28
Total yards	516	489
Rushing yards	181	194
Passing yards	335	295
Turnovers	2	3
Time of possession	26:56	33:04

Texas Southern vs. Southern – Game summary

Quarter	1	2	3	4	Total
Tigers	7	0	0	15	22
Jaguars	7	0	14	7	28

at Cotton Bowl, Dallas, TX

- Date: October 19
- Game time: 2:00 p.m. CDT
- Game weather: 83 °F (28 °C); sunny
- Game attendance: 5,136
- Referee: Marty Adams

Game information

First quarter

- (11:54) SOU TD – Jamar Washington 12-yard rush, Martel Fontenot kick
  Southern 7–0; Drive: 9 plays, 65 yards, 2:22
- (05:05) TXSO TD – Dominic Franklin 39-yard rush, Richard Garcia III kick
  Tied 7–7; Drive: 3 plays, 45 yards, 0:54

Third quarter

- (13:34) SOU TD – Jamar Washington 35-yard pass from Glendon McDaniel, Martel Fontenot kick
  Southern 14–7; Drive: 4 plays, 75 yards, 1:26
- (09:21) SOU TD – Hunter Register 31-yard pass from Glendon McDaniel, Martel Fontenot kick
  Southern 21–7; Drive: 6 plays, 66 yards, 2:03

Fourth quarter

- (13:55) TXSO TD – Devin Williams 14-yard rush, Richard Garcia III kick
  Southern 21–14; Drive: 3 plays, 18 yards, 0:31
- (11:57) SOU TD – Jaearion Davis 7-yard pass from Glendon McDaniel, Martel Fontenot kick
  Southern 28–14; Drive: 5 plays, 48 yards, 1:50
- (05:57) TXSO TD – Devin Williams 4-yard rush, Martel Fontenot kick
  Southern 28–21; Drive: 9 plays, 90 yards, 3:05

Top passers

- TXSO – Devin Williams – 29/44, 335 yards, INT
- SOU – Glendon McDaniel – 17/26, 252 yards, 3 TD

Top rushers

- TXSO – Dominic Franklin – 17 carries, 110 yards, TD
- SOU – Devon Benn – 13 carries, 81 yards

Top receivers

- TXSO – Donnie Corley – 6 receptions, 115 yards
- SOU – Hunter Register – 5 receptions, 93 yards, TD

=== At Alcorn State ===
Statistics	Southern	Alcorn State
First downs	21	22
Total yards	284	377
Rushing yards	75	100
Passing yards	209	277
Turnovers	2	1
Time of possession	27:33	33:27

Southern at Alcorn State – Game summary

Quarter	1	2	3	4	Total
Jaguars	0	6	0	7	13
Braves	0	3	14	10	27

at Jack Spinks Stadium, Lorman, MS

- Date: October 26
- Game time: 6:00 p.m. CDT
- Game weather: 61 °F (16 °C); dark skies, cloudy
- Game attendance: 15,993
- Referee: Marty Adams

Game information

Second quarter

- (14:07) ALCN FG – Corey McCullough 37-yard field goal
  Alcorn State 3–0; Drive: 11 plays, 44 yards, 4:43
- (04:03) SOU TD – Glendon McDaniel 2-yard rush, Martel Fontenot two-point conversion rush failed
  Southern 6–3; Drive: 20 plays, 84 yards, 9:59

Third quarter

- (12:48) ALCN TD – Felix Harper 1-yard rush, Corey McCullough kick
  Alcorn State 10–6; Drive: 5 plays, 75 yards, 2:12
- (05:29) ALCN TD – De'Shawn Waller 4-yard pass from Felix Harper, Corey McCullough kick
  Alcorn State 17–6; Drive: 9 plays, 43 yards, 4:40

Fourth quarter

- (11:20) ALCN FG – Corey McCullough 31-yard field goal
  Alcorn State 20–6; Drive: 14 plays, 85 yards, 6:32
- (05:53) ALCN TD – LeCharles Pringle 11-yard pass from Felix Harper, Corey McCullough kick
  Alcorn State 27–6; Drive: 7 plays, 40 yards, 4:22
- (03:29) SOU TD – Hunter Register 12-yard pass from Ladarius Skelton, Martel Fontenot kick
  Alcorn State 27–13; Drive: 8 plays, 65 yards, 2:18

Top passers

- SOU – Ladarius Skelton – 13/20, 114 yards
- ALCN – Felix Harper – 19/26, 277 yards, 2 Td

Top rushers

- SOU – Devon Benn – 11 carries, 38 yards
- ALCN – De'Shawn Waller – 22 carries, 81 yards

Top receivers

- SOU – Hunter Register – 8 receptions, 70 yards, TD
- ALCN – Chris Blair – 3 receptions, 108 yards

=== Alabama A&M ===
Statistics	Alabama A&M	Southern
First downs	23	28
Total yards	427	558
Rushing yards	71	355
Passing yards	356	203
Turnovers	0	1
Time of possession	24:49	35:11

Alabama A&M at Southern – Game summary

Quarter	1	2	3	4	Total
Bulldogs	0	7	14	10	31
Jaguars	7	7	7	14	35

at A. W. Mumford Stadium, Baton Rouge, LA

- Date: November 2
- Game time: 4:00 p.m. CDT
- Game weather: 63 °F (17 °C)
- Game attendance: 20,344
- Referee: Y. N. Meyers

Game information

First quarter

- (13:30) SOU TD – Ladarius Skelton 28-yard rush, Martel Fontenot kick
  Southern 7–0; Drive: 4 plays, 66 yards, 1:30

Second quarter

- (04:55) AAMU TD – Abdul–Fatai Ibrahim 6-yard pass from Aqeel Glass, Spencer Corey kick
  Tied 7–7; Drive: 7 plays, 29 yards, 3:00
- (01:20) SOU TD – Devon Benn 16-yard rush, Martel Fontenot kick
  Southern 14–7; Drive: 8 plays, 71 yards, 3:30

Third quarter

- (13:54) AAMU TD – Zabrian Moore 22-yard pass from Aqeel Glass, Spencer Corey kick
  Tied 14–14; Drive: 4 plays, 75 yards, 1:01
- (03:20) SOU TD – Hunter Register 31-yard pass from Ladarius Skelton, Martel Fontenot kick
  Southern 21–14; Drive: 7 plays, 72 yards, 3:21
- (02:36) AAMU TD – Abdul–Fatai Ibrahim 60-yard pass from Aqeel Glass, Spencer Corey kick
  Tied 21–21; Drive: 3 plays, 76 yards, 0:39

Fourth quarter

- (12:54) SOU TD – Ladarius Skelton 6-yard rush, Martel Fontenot kick
  Southern 28–21; Drive: 12 plays, 75 yards, 4:42
- (08:32) AAMU TD – Zabrian Moore 28-yard pass from Aqeel Glass, Spencer Corey kick
  Tied 28–28; Drive: 9 plays, 75 yards, 4:22
- (04:20) AAMU FG – Spencer Corey 44-yard field goal
  Alabama A&M 31–28; Drive: 9 plays, 24 yards, 3:13
- (00:28) SOU TD – Hunter Register 2-yard pass from Ladarius Skelton, Martel Fontenot kick
  Southern 35–31; Drive: 11 plays, 55 yards, 3:44

Top passers

- AAMU – Aqeel Glass – 29/37, 356 yards, 4 TD
- SOU – Ladarius Skelton – 16/25, 198 yards, 2 TD

Top rushers

- AAMU – Jordan Bentley – 20 carries, 71 yards
- SOU – Ladarius Skelton – 34 carries, 238 yards, 2 TD

Top receivers

- AAMU – Abdul–Fatai Ibrahim – 7 receptions, 128 yards, 2 TD
- SOU – Hunter Register – 7 receptions, 95 yards, 2 TD

=== Virginia–Lynchburg ===
Statistics	Virginia–Lynchburg	Southern
First downs	9	29
Total yards	147	596
Rushing yards	–16	363
Passing yards	163	233
Turnovers	1	1
Time of possession	27:54	32:06

Virginia–Lynchburg at Southern – Game summary

Quarter	1	2	3	4	Total
Dragons	7	0	0	0	7
Jaguars	21	10	10	7	48

at A. W. Mumford Stadium, Baton Rouge, LA

- Date: November 9
- Game time: 4:00 p.m. CDT
- Game weather: 64 °F (18 °C); fair
- Game attendance: 16,857

Game information

First quarter

- (10:07) SOU TD – Ladarius Skelton 8-yard rush, Cesar Barajas kick
  Southern 7–0; Drive: 8 plays, 68 yards, 3:27
- (07:56) SOU TD – Brandon Hinton 43-yard punt returned, Cesar Barajas kick
  Southern 14–0; Drive: 0 plays, 0 yards, 0:00
- (05:54) SOU TD – Hunter Register 53-yard pass from Ladarius Skelton, Cesar Barajas kick
  Southern 21–0; Drive: 1 play, 53 yards, 0:10
- (04:39) VUL TD – Joshua Gray 25-yard pass from Sherman Brown, Jerry Sandefor kick
  Southern 21–7; Drive: 3 plays, 81 yards, 1:09

Second quarter

- (09:37) SOU TD – Devon Benn 6-yard rush, Cesar Barajas PAT failed
  Southern 27–7; Drive: 3 plays, 55 yards, 1:06
- (04:56) SOU TD – Craig Nelson 6-yard rush, Martel Fontenot kick
  Southern 34–7; Drive: 8 plays, 62 yards, 3:44
- (01:54) SOU TD – Kendrick Jones 25-yard pass from Ladarius Skelton, Martel Fontenot kick
  Southern 41–7; Drive: 5 plays, 55 yards, 1:35

Third quarter

- (12:12) SOU TD – Devon Benn 2-yard rush, Martel Fontenot kick
  Southern 48–7; Drive: 7 plays, 56 yards, 2:37
- (07:49) SOU FG – Cesar Barajas 20-yard field goal
  Southern 51–7; Drive: 8 plays, 35 yards, 3:08

Fourth quarter

- (14:55) SOU TD – Craig Nelson 3-yard rush, Martel Fontenot kick
  Southern 58–7; Drive: 10 plays, 78 yards, 5:41

Top passers

- VUL – Sherman Brown – 13/27, 163 yards, TD, INT
- SOU – Ladarius Skelton – 10/12, 193 yards, 2 TD

Top rushers

- VUL – Thomas Newman – 8 carries, 9 yards
- SOU – Devon Benn – 16 carries, 120 yards, 2 TD

Top receivers

- VUL – Said Sidebe – 2 receptions, 63 yards
- SOU – Cameron Mackey – 3 receptions, 68 yards, TD

=== At Jackson State ===
Statistics	Southern	Jackson State
First downs	19	22
Total yards	397	532
Rushing yards	264	308
Passing yards	133	224
Turnovers	2	1
Time of possession	27:21	32:39

Southern at Jackson State – Game summary

Quarter	1	2	3	4	Total
Jaguars	7	10	16	7	40
Tigers	10	14	3	7	34

at Mississippi Veterans Memorial Stadium, Jackson, MS

- Date: November 16
- Game time: 2:00 p.m. CDT
- Game weather: 55 °F (13 °C); sunny
- Game attendance: 40,085

Game information

First quarter

- (13:10) JSU FG – Adrian Salazar 26-yard field goal
  Jackson State 3–0; Drive: 5 plays, 67 yards, 1:50
- (09:24) SOU TD – Hunter Register 6-yard pass from Ladarius Skelton, Martel Fontenot kick
  Southern 7–3; Drive: 7 plays, 65 yards, 3:46
- (02:55) JSU TD – D. D. Bowie 2-yard pass from Jalon Jones, Adrian Salazar kick
  Jackson State 10–7; Drive: 15 plays, 85 yards, 6:22

Second quarter

- (09:57) SOU FG – Cesar Barajas 40-yard field goal
  Tied 10–10; Drive: 11 plays, 66 yards, 4:15
- (03:41) SOU TD – Ladarius Skelton 29-yard rush, Martel Fontenot kick
  Southern 17–10; Drive: 9 plays, 80 yards, 5:06
- (01:44) JSU TD – Terrell Kennedy III 23-yard pass from Jalon Jones, Adrian Salazar kick
  Tied 17–17; Drive: 5 plays, 65 yards, 2:12
- (00:45) JSU TD – Ra'Mei Wallace 34-yard pass from Jalon Jones, Adrian Salazar kick
  Jackson State 24–17; Drive: 3 plays, 29 yards, 0:44

Third quarter

- (06:33) SOU SF – Team safety
  Jackson State 24–19; Drive: 1 play, -12 yards, 0:00
- (04:41) SOU TD – Ladarius Skelton 22-yard rush, Martel Fontenot kick
  Southern 26–24; Drive: 4 plays, 39 yards, 1:45
- (01:38) JSU FG – Zach Gleaton 25-yard field goal
  Jackson State 27–26; Drive: 6 plays, 82 yards, 2:53
- (01:24) SOU TD – Brandon Hinton 87-yard kickoff returned, Martel Fontenot kick
  Southern 33–27; Drive: 0 plays, 0 yards, 0:00

Fourth quarter

- (06:24) SOU TD – Ladarius Skelton 7-yard rush, Martel Fontenot kick
  Southern 40–27; Drive: 7 plays, 61 yards, 3:09
- (00:50) JSU TD – Ra'Mei Wallace 4-yard pass from Jalon Jones, Adrian Salazar kick
  Southern 40–34; Drive: 10 plays, 93 yards, 2:43

Top passers

- SOU – Ladarius Skelton – 12/23, 133 yards, TD, INT
- JSU – Jalon Jones – 16/30, 224 yards, 4 TD, INT

Top rushers

- SOU – Ladarius Skelton – 21 carries, 171 yards, 3 TD
- JSU – Keshawn Harper – 22 carries, 208 yards

Top receivers

- SOU – Hunter Register – 3 receptions, 66 yards, TD
- JSU – D. D. Bowie – 6 receptions, 89 yards, TD

=== Vs. Grambling State ===
Statistics	Grambling State	Southern
First downs	20	21
Total yards	364	389
Rushing yards	209	208
Passing yards	181	155
Turnovers	0	1
Time of possession	29:44	30:16

Grambling State vs. Southern – Game summary

Quarter	1	2	3	4	Total
Tigers	7	14	0	7	28
Jaguars	3	14	7	6	30

at Mercedes–Benz Superdome, New Orleans, LA

- Date: November 30
- Game time: 4:00 p.m. CDT
- Game weather: 79 °F (26 °C); strong winds, mostly cloudy
- Game attendance: 68,314
- Referee: Tony Ross
- TV: NBC Sports Network

Game information

First quarter

- (10:34) GRAM TD – Devante Davis 13-yard pass from Geremy Hickbottom, Miguel Mendez kick
  Grambling State 7–0; Drive: 8 plays, 42 yards, 3:17
- (02:52) SOU FG – Cesar Barajas 19-yard field goal
  Grambling State 7–3; Drive: 10 plays, 64 yards, 4:45

Second quarter

- (09:30) GRAM TD – CJ Russell 27-yard rush, Miguel Mendez kick
  Grambling State 14–3; Drive: 5 plays, 63 yards, 1:35
- (08:45) GRAM TD – Keilon Elder 1-yard rush, Miguel Mendez kick
  Grambling State 21–3; Drive: 3 plays, 24 yards, 0:39
- (03:38) SOU TD – Hunter Register 3-yard pass from Ladarius Skelton, Martel Fontenot kick
  Grambling State 21–10; Drive: 23 plays, 75 yards, 5:07
- (00:00) SOU TD – Jarod Sims 1-yard rush, Martel Fontenot kick
  Grambling State 21–17; Drive: 6 plays, 71 yards, 0:50

Third quarter

- (04:40) SOU TD – Hunter Register 5-yard pass from Ladarius Skelton, Martel Fontenot kick
  Southern 24–21; Drive: 13 plays, 77 yards, 5:01

Fourth quarter

- (14:56) GRAM TD – Geremy Hickbottom 3-yard rush, Miguel Mendez kick
  Grambling State 28–24; Drive: 11 plays, 75 yards, 4:40
- (14:11) SOU TD – Jarod Sims 36-yard rush, Martel Fontenot PAT blocked
  Southern 30–28; Drive: 2 plays, 74 yards, 0:39

Top passers

- GRAM – Geremy Hickbottom – 15/28, 155 yards, TD
- SOU – Ladarius Skelton – 18/25, 181 yards, 2 TD

Top rushers

- GRAM – Keilon Elder – 19 carries, 112 yards, TD
- SOU – Jarod Sims – 7 carries, 89 yards, 2 TD

Top receivers

- GRAM – Lyndon Rash – 4 receptions, 49 yards
- SOU – Hunter Register – 7 receptions, 75 yards, 2 TD

=== At Alcorn State (SWAC Championship) ===
Statistics	Southern	Alcorn State
First downs	27	18
Total yards	419	347
Rushing yards	251	121
Passing yards	168	226
Turnovers	6	3
Time of possession	36:18	23:42

Southern at Alcorn State – Game summary

Quarter	1	2	3	4	Total
Jaguars	7	7	3	7	24
Braves	9	7	0	23	39

at Jack Spinks Stadium, Lorman, MS

- Date: December 7
- Game time: 3:00 p.m. CDT
- Game weather: 62 °F (17 °C); clear
- Game attendance: 22,365
- Referee: Marty Adams
- TV: ESPNU

Game information

First quarter

- (02:07) SOU TD – Jarod Sims 32-yard rush, Martel Fontenot kick
  Southern 7–0; Drive: 6 plays, 87 yards, 2:26
- (01:56) ALCN TD – Javen Morrison 89-yard kickoff returned, Corey McCullough kick
  Tied 7–7; Drive: 0 plays, 0 yards, 0:00
- (01:06) ALCN SF – Team safety
  Alcorn State 9–7; Drive: 0 plays, 0 yards, 0:00

Second quarter

- (10:33) SOU TD – Ladarius Skelton 3-yard rush, Martel Fontenot kick
  Southern 14–9; Drive: 9 plays, 70 yards, 4:27
- (08:58) ALCN TD – Trey Turner 3-yard rush, Corey McCullough kick
  Alcorn State 16–14; Drive: 4 plays, 75 yards, 1:33

Third quarter

- (06:44) SOU FG – Cesar Barajas 41-yard field goal
  Southern 17–16; Drive: 6 plays, 30 yards, 2:12

Fourth quarter

- (06:44) ALCN TD – LeCharles Pringle 56-yard pass from Felix Harper, Felix Harper two-point pass conversion attempt failed
  Alcorn State 22–17; Drive: 4 plays, 60 yards, 1:23
- (08:43) SOU TD – Ladarius Skelton 8-yard rush, Cesar Barajas kick
  Southern 24–22; Drive: 12 plays, 80 yards, 5:12
- (05:07) ALCN FG – Corey McCullough 23-yard field goal
  Alcorn State 25–24; Drive: 12 plays, 63 yards, 3:32
- (01:57) ALCN TD – De'Shawn Waller 6-yard rush, Corey McCullough kick
  Southern 32–24; Drive: 3 plays, 48 yards, 1:23
- (01:12) ALCN TD – Taurence Wilson 53-yard interception returned, Corey McCullough kick
  Southern 39–24; Drive: 0 plays, 0 yards, 0:00

Top passers

- SOU – Ladarius Skelton – 18/30, 159 yards, 3 INT
- ALCN – Felix Harper – 12/25, 226 yards, TD, 2 INT

Top rushers

- SOU – Jarod Sims – 20 carries, 149 yards, TD
- ALCN – Niko Duffey – 15 carries, 63 yards

Top receivers

- SOU – Brandon Hinton – 5 receptions, 40 yards
- ALCN – LeCharles Pringle – 5 receptions, 145 yards, TD

== Ranking movements ==
Ranking movements Legend: RV = Received votes
	Week													
Poll	Pre	1	2	3	4	5	6	7	8	9	10	11	12	Final
STATS FCS	RV													
Coaches	RV													
