= John Hendrick (American football) =

American football player and coach

Current position
- Title: Defensive coordinator
- Team: Hinds
- Conference: MACCC

Playing career
- 1978–1981: Pittsburgh
- Position: Defensive lineman

Coaching career (HC unless noted)
- 1983: Delaware State (assistant)
- 1984–1985: Pittsburgh (assistant)
- 1986: Southern (assistant)
- 1987–1988: Texas A&M (assistant)
- 1989–1990: LSU (OT/TE)
- 1991–1992: Kansas State (DL)
- 1993–1994: Temple (DL)
- 1995–2002: Mississippi State (DL/ST)
- 2003–2006: Benedict
- 2007: South Carolina State (DC)
- 2008–2010: South Florida (DL/ST)
- 2011: Tulane (DL/ST)
- 2012–2013: Alabama State (DE/ST)
- 2014: Arkansas–Pine Bluff (ST)
- 2015: Alabama State (DE/ST)
- 2016–2018: Jackson State (DC)
- 2018: Jackson State (interim HC)
- 2019: Jackson State
- 2021–present: Hinds (DC)

Head coaching record
- Overall: 24–34

John Hendrick is an American college football coach and former professional player. He is the defensive coordinator at Hinds Community College, a position he has held since 2021. He is the former head football coach at Jackson State University in Jackson, Mississippi, a position he had assumed midway through the 2018 season and maintained throughout the 2019 season. Hendrick served as the head football coach at Benedict College in Columbia, South Carolina from 2003 to 2006.

Hendrick was a four-year letter winner at the University of Pittsburgh from 1978 to 1981 as a defensive lineman under head coach Jackie Sherrill, where he was a teammate of quarterback Dan Marino.

== Head coaching record ==
Year	Team	Overall	Conference	Standing	Bowl/playoffs
Benedict Tigers (Southern Intercollegiate Athletic Conference) (2003–2006)
2003	Benedict	6–5	4–4	T–5th	
2004	Benedict	3–8	2–6	7th	
2005	Benedict	6–5	4–5	6th	
2006	Benedict	3–7	2–5	8th	
Benedict:		18–25	11–21		
Jackson State Tigers (Southwestern Athletic Conference) (2018–2019)
2018	Jackson State	2–1 (Note: Tony Hughes served as the head football coach for the first seven games of the 2018 before he was fired. Jackson State finished the season with an overall record of 5–5 and a mark of 4–3 in Southwestern Athletic Conference play.)	2–1	3rd (East)	
2019	Jackson State	4–8	3–4	4th (East)	
Jackson State:		6–9	5–5		
Total:		24–34			
