= 2019 Arkansas–Pine Bluff Golden Lions football team =

American college football season

2019 Arkansas–Pine Bluff Golden Lions football
- Conference: Southwestern Athletic Conference
- West Division
- Record: 6–5 (3–4 SWAC)
- Head coach: Cedric Thomas (2nd season)
- Offensive coordinator: Jermaine Gales (2nd season)
- Defensive coordinator: Jonathan Bradley (1st season)
- Home stadium: Simmons Bank Field

2019 Southwestern Athletic Conference football standings
	Conf.			Overall
Team	W		L	W		L
East Division
Alcorn State x$	6	–	1	9	–	4
Alabama A&M	4	–	3	7	–	5
Alabama State	4	–	3	5	–	6
Jackson State	3	–	4	4	–	8
Mississippi Valley State	1	–	6	2	–	9
West Division
Southern x	6	–	1	8	–	5
Prairie View A&M	4	–	3	6	–	5
Grambling State	4	–	3	6	–	5
Arkansas–Pine Bluff	3	–	4	6	–	5
Texas Southern	0	–	7	0	–	11
Championship: Alcorn State 39, Southern 24
$ – Conference champion; x – Division champion/co-champions

The 2019 Arkansas–Pine Bluff Golden Lions football team represented the University of Arkansas at Pine Bluff in the 2019 NCAA Division I FCS football season. The Golden Lions were led by second-year head coach Cedric Thomas and played their home games at Simmons Bank Field in Pine Bluff, Arkansas as members of the West Division of the Southwestern Athletic Conference (SWAC).

== Preseason ==
=== Preseason polls ===
The SWAC released their preseason poll on July 16, 2019. The Golden Lions were picked to finish in fifth place in the West Division.

=== Preseason all–SWAC teams ===
The Golden Lions placed four players on the preseason all–SWAC teams.

Offense

1st team

Taeyler Porter – RB

DeJuan Miller – WR

Defense

1st team

Jalen Steward – DL

Specialists

2nd team

Tyrin Ralph – RS

== Schedule ==
Date	Time	Opponent	Site	TV	Result	Attendance
August 31	7:00 p.m.	at TCU*	Amon G. Carter Stadium; Fort Worth, TX	FSN	L 7–39	40,422
September 7	6:00 p.m.	at Alabama A&M	Louis Crews Stadium; Huntsville, AL	YouTube	W 52–34	11,340
September 14	6:00 p.m.	Langston*	Simmons Bank Field; Pine Bluff, AR	Golden Lions All-Access	W 53–15	9,613
September 21	2:00 p.m.	at Tennessee State*	Hale Stadium; Nashville, TN	ESPN+	W 37–31	8,683
September 28	6:00 p.m.	Southern	Simmons Bank Field; Pine Bluff, AR	ESPN3	L 7–31	6,863
October 5	3:00 p.m.	Lane*^{†}	Simmons Bank Field; Pine Bluff, AR	UAPB All Access	W 45–38	1,328
October 12	1:00 p.m.	Mississippi Valley State	Simmons Bank Field; Pine Bluff, AR	Golden Lions All-Access	W 38–6	6,225
October 26	1:00 p.m.	Grambling State	Simmons Bank Field; Pine Bluff, AR	Golden Lions All-Access	L 33–39	7,513
November 2	6:00 p.m.	at Jackson State	Mississippi Veterans Memorial Stadium; Jackson, MS	JSUTV Facebook	L 12–21	
November 9	2:00 p.m.	at Prairie View A&M	Panther Stadium; Prairie View, TX	PVAMU SN	L 20–37	
November 23	1:00 p.m.	Texas Southern	Simmons Bank Field; Pine Bluff, AR	Golden Lions All Access	W 45–13	5,329
*Non-conference game; ^{†}Homecoming; All times are in Central time

== Game summaries ==
=== At TCU ===
	1	2	3	4	Total
Golden Lions	0	0	7	0	7
Horned Frogs	10	6	13	10	39

=== At Alabama A&M ===
	1	2	3	4	Total
Golden Lions	17	14	21	0	52
Bulldogs	14	0	20	0	34

=== Langston ===
	1	2	3	4	Total
Lions	0	6	3	6	15
Golden Lions	6	28	19	0	53

=== At Tennessee State ===
	1	2	3	4	Total
Golden Lions	7	12	6	12	37
Tigers	7	3	14	7	31

=== Southern ===
	1	2	3	4	Total
Jaguars	14	0	7	10	31
Golden Lions	0	7	0	0	7

=== Lane ===
	1	2	3	4	Total
Dragons	3	3	25	7	38
Golden Lions	0	24	7	14	45

=== Mississippi Valley State ===
	1	2	3	4	Total
Delta Devils	6	0	0	0	6
Golden Lions	7	14	7	10	38

=== Grambling State ===
	1	2	3	4	Total
Tigers	9	13	7	10	39
Golden Lions	12	7	7	7	33

=== At Jackson State ===
	1	2	3	4	Total
Golden Lions	0	0	12	0	12
Tigers	0	7	14	0	21

=== At Prairie View A&M ===
	1	2	3	4	Total
Golden Lions	0	0	7	13	20
Panthers	0	16	7	14	37

=== Texas Southern ===
	1	2	3	4	Total
Tigers	0	7	0	6	13
Golden Lions	10	21	0	14	45
