= 2019 Alcorn State Braves football team =

American college football season

2019 Alcorn State Braves football

SWAC champion SWAC East Division champion

SWAC Championship Game, W 39–24 vs. Southern

Celebration Bowl, L 44–64 vs. North Carolina A&T
- Conference: Southwestern Athletic Conference
- East Division
- Record: 9–4 (6–1 SWAC)
- Head coach: Fred McNair (4th season)
- Offensive coordinator: Elliott Wratten (1st season)
- Offensive scheme: Spread option
- Defensive coordinator: Cedric Thornton (2nd season)
- Base defense: Multiple 4–2–5
- Home stadium: Casem-Spinks Stadium

2019 Southwestern Athletic Conference football standings
	Conf.			Overall
Team	W		L	W		L
East Division
Alcorn State x$	6	–	1	9	–	4
Alabama A&M	4	–	3	7	–	5
Alabama State	4	–	3	5	–	6
Jackson State	3	–	4	4	–	8
Mississippi Valley State	1	–	6	2	–	9
West Division
Southern x	6	–	1	8	–	5
Prairie View A&M	4	–	3	6	–	5
Grambling State	4	–	3	6	–	5
Arkansas–Pine Bluff	3	–	4	6	–	5
Texas Southern	0	–	7	0	–	11
Championship: Alcorn State 39, Southern 24
$ – Conference champion; x – Division champion/co-champions

The 2019 Alcorn State Braves football team represented Alcorn State University in the 2019 NCAA Division I FCS football season. The Braves were led by fourth-year head coach Fred McNair and played their home games at Casem-Spinks Stadium. They were members of the East Division of the Southwestern Athletic Conference (SWAC).

== Preseason ==
=== Preseason polls ===
The SWAC released their preseason poll on July 16, 2019. The Braves were picked to finish in first place in the East Division.

=== Preseason all–SWAC teams ===
The Braves placed thirteen different players on the preseason all–SWAC teams.

Offense

1st team

Noah Johnson – QB

De'Shawn Waller – RB

Deonte Brooks – OL

Mustaffa Ibrahim – OL

Kevin Hall – OL

Defense

1st team

Solomon Muhammad – LB

Javen Morrison – DB

Qwynnterrio Cole – DB

2nd team

Darrell Henderson – DL

Theron Bonds – DL

Brelion Hollis – LB

Daylon Burks – DB

Specialists

1st team

Corey McCullough – K

2nd team

Corey McCullough – P

== Schedule ==
Date	Time	Opponent	Site	TV	Result	Attendance
August 31	6:00 p.m.	at Southern Miss*	M. M. Roberts Stadium; Hattiesburg, MS	ESPN+	L 10–38	31,076
September 7	6:00 p.m.	Mississippi College*	Casem-Spinks Stadium; Lorman, MS	Braves All Access	W 45–7	7,358
September 14	6:00 p.m.	at McNeese State*	Cowboy Stadium; Lake Charles, LA	COWBOYINSIDER	L 14–17	10,127
September 21	5:00 p.m.	Prairie View A&M	Casem-Spinks Stadium; Lorman, MS	ESPN3	W 45–41	15,958
September 28	6:00 p.m.	Mississippi Valley State	Casem-Spinks Stadium; Lorman, MS	Braves All Access	W 45–19	7,593
October 5	2:00 p.m.	at Alabama State	New ASU Stadium; Montgomery, AL	ASU All Access	W 35–7	12,721
October 12	2:00 p.m.	Savannah State*^{†}	Casem-Spinks Stadium; Lorman, MS	Braves All Access	W 42–17	17,593
October 26	2:00 p.m.	Southern	Casem-Spinks Stadium; Lorman, MS	Braves All Access	W 27–13	15,993
November 9	2:00 p.m.	at Grambling State	Eddie Robinson Stadium; Grambling, LA	ESPN3	L 16–19 ^{OT}	7,554
November 16	2:00 p.m.	Alabama A&M	Casem-Spinks Stadium; Lorman, MS	Braves All Access	W 34–28	1,978
November 23	2:00 p.m.	at Jackson State	Mississippi Veterans Memorial Stadium; Jackson, MS (Soul Bowl)	ESPN3	W 41–6	35,104
December 7	3:00 p.m.	Southern	Casem-Spinks Stadium; Lorman, MS (SWAC Championship Game)	ESPNU	W 39–24	22,365
December 21	11:00 a.m.	vs. No. 23 North Carolina A&T*	Mercedes-Benz Stadium; Atlanta, GA (Celebration Bowl)	ABC	L 44–64	32,968
*Non-conference game; ^{†}Homecoming; Rankings from STATS Poll released prior to the game; All times are in Central time

== Game summaries ==
=== At Southern Miss ===
	1	2	3	4	Total
Braves	0	0	10	0	10
Golden Eagles	10	3	15	10	38

Statistics	ALCN	USM
First downs	15	16
Total yards	229	389
Rushing yards	80	96
Passing yards	149	293
Turnovers	2	2
Time of possession	34:07	25:53

Team	Category	Player	Statistics
Alcorn State	Passing	Noah Johnson	17/31, 148 yards, INT
Alcorn State	Rushing	De'Shawn Waller	16 rushes, 56 yards, TD
Alcorn State	Receiving	Chris Blair	4 receptions, 67 yards
Southern Miss	Passing	Jack Abraham	18/28, 293 yards, TD, INT
Southern Miss	Rushing	Dee Baker	8 rushes, 35 yards
Southern Miss	Receiving	Jordan Mitchell	7 receptions, 133 yards

=== Mississippi College ===
	1	2	3	4	Total
Choctaws	0	0	0	7	7
Braves	21	7	3	14	45

Statistics	MIS	ALCN
First downs	9	22
Total yards	242	465
Rushing yards	117	324
Passing yards	125	141
Turnovers	2	1
Time of possession	31:29	28:31

Team	Category	Player	Statistics
Mississippi College	Passing	DeAnte' Smith-Moore	3/3, 68 yards, TD
Mississippi College	Rushing	Detric Hawthorn	11 rushes, 26 yards
Mississippi College	Receiving	Rondell Cole	2 receptions, 49 yards, TD
Alcorn State	Passing	Noah Johnson	15/23, 132 yards, TD
Alcorn State	Rushing	Niko Duffey	13 rushes, 138 yards, 2 TD
Alcorn State	Receiving	Niko Duffey	3 receptions, 38 yards, TD

=== At McNeese State ===
	1	2	3	4	Total
Braves	0	0	0	14	14
Cowboys	7	10	0	0	17

Statistics	ALCN	MCN
First downs	22	14
Total yards	318	324
Rushing yards	154	133
Passing yards	164	191
Turnovers	3	2
Time of possession	32:05	27:55

Team	Category	Player	Statistics
Alcorn State	Passing	Felix Harper	13/28, 132 yards, 2 TD, 2 INT
Alcorn State	Rushing	De'Shawn Waller	18 rushes, 77 yards
Alcorn State	Receiving	Niko Duffey	5 receptions, 54 yards, TD
McNeese State	Passing	Cody Orgeron	19/29, 191 yards, 2 TD
McNeese State	Rushing	J'Cobi Skinner	14 rushes, 52 yards
McNeese State	Receiving	Trevor Begue	8 receptions, 94 yards, TD

=== Prairie View A&M ===
	1	2	3	4	Total
Panthers	0	19	15	7	41
Braves	17	7	7	14	45

Statistics	PV	ALCN
First downs	33	27
Total yards	508	405
Rushing yards	187	125
Passing yards	321	280
Turnovers	4	1
Time of possession	30:59	29:01

Team	Category	Player	Statistics
Prairie View A&M	Passing	Jalen Morton	23/35, 321 yards, 4 TD, 3 INT
Prairie View A&M	Rushing	Dawonya Tucker	22 rushes, 128 yards, 2 TD
Prairie View A&M	Receiving	Tony Mullins	4 receptions, 84 yards, TD
Alcorn State	Passing	Felix Harper	25/37, 280 yards, 2 TD
Alcorn State	Rushing	Niko Duffey	22 rushes, 86 yards, 2 TD
Alcorn State	Receiving	LeCharles Pringle	8 receptions, 144 yards, TD

=== Mississippi Valley State ===
	1	2	3	4	Total
Delta Devils	0	13	6	0	19
Braves	7	14	17	7	45

Statistics	MVST	ALCN
First downs	21	25
Total yards	307	549
Rushing yards	145	153
Passing yards	162	396
Turnovers	0	5
Time of possession	30:04	29:56

Team	Category	Player	Statistics
Mississippi Valley State	Passing	Dejerric Bryant	17/36, 162 yards, 2 TD
Mississippi Valley State	Rushing	Dejerric Bryant	22 rushes, 92 yards, TD
Mississippi Valley State	Receiving	Johnny Wilson	3 receptions, 42 yards, TD
Alcorn State	Passing	Felix Harper	21/30, 396 yards, 2 TD
Alcorn State	Rushing	Trey Turner	14 rushes, 64 yards
Alcorn State	Receiving	Chris Blair	3 receptions, 144 yards, 2 TD

=== At Alabama State ===
	1	2	3	4	Total
Braves	14	14	0	7	35
Hornets	0	0	7	0	7

Statistics	ALCN	ALST
First downs	16	17
Total yards	359	258
Rushing yards	213	67
Passing yards	146	191
Turnovers	0	5
Time of possession	29:43	30:17

Team	Category	Player	Statistics
Alcorn State	Passing	Felix Harper	10/17, 146 yards, 3 TD
Alcorn State	Rushing	Niko Duffey	9 rushes, 101 yards, TD
Alcorn State	Receiving	LeCharles Pringle	3 receptions, 57 yards, TD
Alabama State	Passing	Khadarris Davis	12/26, 161 yards, TD, 4 INT
Alabama State	Rushing	Ezra Gray	9 rushes, 46 yards
Alabama State	Receiving	Moses Marshall IV	4 receptions, 73 yards

=== Savannah State ===
	1	2	3	4	Total
Tigers	3	14	0	0	17
Braves	14	14	14	0	42

Statistics	SAV	ALCN
First downs	22	21
Total yards	262	488
Rushing yards	175	164
Passing yards	87	324
Turnovers	3	2
Time of possession	37:01	22:59

Team	Category	Player	Statistics
Savannah State	Passing	D'Vonn Gibbons	6/11, 87 yards, TD, INT
Savannah State	Rushing	Dangelo Durham	23 rushes, 94 yards
Savannah State	Receiving	Cameron White	3 receptions, 44 yards, TD
Alcorn State	Passing	Felix Harper	16/21, 324 yards, 5 TD
Alcorn State	Rushing	De'Shawn Waller	16 rushes, 90 yards
Alcorn State	Receiving	Juan Anthony Jr.	7 receptions, 140 yards, TD

=== Southern ===
	1	2	3	4	Total
Jaguars	0	6	0	7	13
Braves	0	3	14	10	27

Statistics	SOU	ALCN
First downs	21	22
Total yards	284	377
Rushing yards	75	100
Passing yards	209	277
Turnovers	2	1
Time of possession	27:33	32:27

Team	Category	Player	Statistics
Southern	Passing	Ladarius Skelton	13/20, 114 yards
Southern	Rushing	Devon Benn	11 rushes, 38 yards
Southern	Receiving	Hunter Register	8 receptions, 70 yards, TD
Alcorn State	Passing	Felix Harper	19/26, 277 yards, 2 TD
Alcorn State	Rushing	De'Shawn Miller	22 rushes, 81 yards
Alcorn State	Receiving	Chris Blair	3 receptions, 108 yards

=== At Grambling State ===
	1	2	3	4	OT	Total
Braves	0	10	6	0	0	16
Tigers	0	10	0	6	3	19

Statistics	ALCN	GRAM
First downs	20	20
Total yards	385	353
Rushing yards	116	133
Passing yards	269	220
Turnovers	2	2
Time of possession	30:34	29:26

Team	Category	Player	Statistics
Alcorn State	Passing	Felix Harper	24/48, 269 yards, TD, 2 INT
Alcorn State	Rushing	Niko Duffey	20 rushes, 106 yards
Alcorn State	Receiving	Raidarious Anderson	6 receptions, 103 yards, TD
Grambling State	Passing	Geremy Hickbottom	15/23, 157 yards, TD, INT
Grambling State	Rushing	Kevin Dominique	11 rushes, 69 yards
Grambling State	Receiving	Raylon Richardson	6 receptions, 101 yards

=== Alabama A&M ===
	1	2	3	4	Total
Bulldogs	7	7	7	7	28
Braves	7	14	6	7	34

Statistics	AAMU	ALCN
First downs	32	27
Total yards	531	522
Rushing yards	259	234
Passing yards	272	288
Turnovers	2	2
Time of possession	32:32	27:28

Team	Category	Player	Statistics
Alabama A&M	Passing	Aqeel Glass	26/48, 264 yards, 2 INT
Alabama A&M	Rushing	Jordan Bentley	29 rushes, 245 yards, 4 TD
Alabama A&M	Receiving	Abdul-Fatai Ibrahim	9 receptions, 112 yards
Alcorn State	Passing	Felix Harper	18/27, 288 yards, 4 TD, INT
Alcorn State	Rushing	Niko Duffey	17 rushes, 100 yards, TD
Alcorn State	Receiving	LeCharles Pringle	4 receptions, 113 yards, 3 TD

=== At Jackson State ===
	1	2	3	4	Total
Braves	7	24	7	3	41
Tigers	0	0	6	0	6

Statistics	ALCN	JKST
First downs	22	9
Total yards	390	146
Rushing yards	116	6
Passing yards	274	140
Turnovers	1	4
Time of possession	34:07	25:53

Team	Category	Player	Statistics
Alcorn State	Passing	Felix Harper	20/35, 274 yards, 4 TD
Alcorn State	Rushing	Niko Duffey	15 rushes, 73 yards
Alcorn State	Receiving	Chris Blair	6 receptions, 136 yards, TD
Jackson State	Passing	Jalon Jones	7/16, 102 yards, 2 INT
Jackson State	Rushing	Kymani Clarke	5 rushes, 17 yards
Jackson State	Receiving	Warren Newman	2 receptions, 67 yards

=== Southern (SWAC Championship) ===
	1	2	3	4	Total
Jaguars	7	7	3	7	24
Braves	9	7	0	23	39

Statistics	SOU	ALCN
First downs	27	18
Total yards	419	347
Rushing yards	251	121
Passing yards	168	226
Turnovers	6	3
Time of possession	36:18	23:42

Team	Category	Player	Statistics
Southern Jaguars	Passing	Ladarius Skelton	18/30, 159 yards, 3 INT
Southern Jaguars	Rushing	Jerodd Sims	20 rushes, 149 yards, TD
Southern Jaguars	Receiving	Brandon Hinton	5 receptions, 40 yards
Alcorn State	Passing	Felix Harper	12/25, 226 yards, TD, 2 INT
Alcorn State	Rushing	Niko Duffey	15 rushes, 63 yards
Alcorn State	Receiving	LeCharles Pringle	5 receptions, 145 yards, TD

=== Vs. No. 23 North Carolina A&T (Celebration Bowl) ===
	1	2	3	4	Total
Braves	3	7	21	13	44
No. 23 Aggies	0	24	28	12	64

Statistics	ALCN	NCAT
First downs	24	21
Total yards	460	574
Rushing yards	119	210
Passing yards	341	364
Turnovers	1	2
Time of possession	29:36	30:24

Team	Category	Player	Statistics
Alcorn State	Passing	Felix Harper	25/42, 341 yards, 3 TD, INT
Alcorn State	Rushing	De'Shawn Waller	13 rushes, 59 yards, TD
Alcorn State	Receiving	Chris Blair	7 receptions, 150 yards, TD
North Carolina A&T	Passing	Kylil Carter	18/30, 364 yards, 6 TD
North Carolina A&T	Rushing	Jah-Maine Martin	15 rushes, 110 yards, 2 TD
North Carolina A&T	Receiving	Korey Banks	6 receptions, 122 yards, 2 TD
