= Cedric Thomas =

American football coach and player

Current position
- Title: Head coach
- Team: Alcorn State
- Conference: SWAC
- Record: 11–12

Playing career
- 1997–1998: Mississippi Delta
- 1999–2000: Arkansas–Pine Bluff
- Position: Defensive back

Coaching career (HC unless noted)
- 2001: Alcorn State (GA)
- 2002: UT–Martin (RB)
- 2003–2004: Mississippi Delta (DC)
- 2005–2006: Itawamba (DB)
- 2007–2011: Mississippi Delta (DC)
- 2012–2015: Alcorn State (DB)
- 2016–2017: Alcorn State (DC)
- 2018–2019: Arkansas–Pine Bluff
- 2020: Southern Miss (DB)
- 2021: Mississippi Delta
- 2022–2023: Alcorn State (DC)
- 2024–present: Alcorn State

Head coaching record
- Overall: 19–27 (college); 5–4 (junior college)

Cedric Thomas is an American college football coach and former player. He is the head coach at Alcorn State University in Lorman, Mississippi, a position he has held since December 2023. Thomas previously served as the defensive coordinator at Alcorn State and was appointed to the Head Coach position after the resignation of long-time coach Fred McNair. Thomas served as the head football coach at the University of Arkansas–Pine Bluff from 2018 to 2019 and Mississippi Delta Community College in 2021. Thomas played college football at Arkansas–Pine Bluff, before graduating in 2001.

The former MDCC and UAPB standout earned an Associate of Arts degree from MDCC in 1998, a bachelor's degree in recreation in 2001 from UAPB, and a master's degree in administration from Alcorn State in 2015.

The former East Side High School graduate is married to Kelunda, and the couple has one daughter, Loegan. Thomas also has a son, Cedric Jr.

== Head coaching record ==
=== College ===
Year	Team	Overall	Conference	Standing	Bowl/playoffs
Arkansas–Pine Bluff Golden Lions (Southwestern Athletic Conference) (2018–2019)
2018	Arkansas–Pine Bluff	2–9	1–6	T–4th (West)	
2019	Arkansas–Pine Bluff	6–5	3–4	4th (West)	
Arkansas–Pine Bluff:		8–14	4–10		
Alcorn State Braves (Southwestern Athletic Conference) (2024–present)
2024	Alcorn State	6–6	5–3	2nd (West)	
2025	Alcorn State	5–7	4–4	T–3rd (West)	
Alcorn State:		11–12	9–7		
Total:		19–27			

=== Junior college ===
Year	Team	Overall	Conference	Standing	Bowl/playoffs
Mississippi Delta Trojans (Mississippi Association of Community and Junior Colleges) (2021)
2021	Mississippi Delta	5–4	3–3	3rd (North)	
Mississippi Delta:		5–4	3–3		
Total:		5–4			
