= 2019 Jackson State Tigers football team =

American college football season

2019 Jackson State Tigers football
- Conference: Southwestern Athletic Conference
- East Division
- Record: 4–8 (3–4 SWAC)
- Head coach: John Hendrick (1st season)
- Offensive coordinator: Ron Dickerson Jr. (1st season)
- Offensive scheme: Spread
- Defensive coordinator: Lionel Stokes (1st season)
- Base defense: 3–4
- Home stadium: Mississippi Veterans Memorial Stadium

2019 Southwestern Athletic Conference football standings
	Conf.			Overall
Team	W		L	W		L
East Division
Alcorn State x$	6	–	1	9	–	4
Alabama A&M	4	–	3	7	–	5
Alabama State	4	–	3	5	–	6
Jackson State	3	–	4	4	–	8
Mississippi Valley State	1	–	6	2	–	9
West Division
Southern x	6	–	1	8	–	5
Prairie View A&M	4	–	3	6	–	5
Grambling State	4	–	3	6	–	5
Arkansas–Pine Bluff	3	–	4	6	–	5
Texas Southern	0	–	7	0	–	11
Championship: Alcorn State 39, Southern 24
$ – Conference champion; x – Division champion/co-champions

The 2019 Jackson State Tigers football team represented Jackson State University in the 2019 NCAA Division I FCS football season. The Tigers were led by first-year head coach John Hendrick and played their home games at Mississippi Veterans Memorial Stadium in Jackson, Mississippi as members of the East Division of the Southwestern Athletic Conference (SWAC).

== Preseason ==
=== Preseason polls ===
The SWAC released their preseason poll on July 16, 2019. The Tigers were picked to finish in third place in the East Division.

=== Preseason all–SWAC teams ===
The Tigers placed two players on the preseason all–SWAC teams.

Defense

2nd team

Khalil Johnson – DL

Keonte Hampton – LB

== Schedule ==
Date	Time	Opponent	Site	TV	Result	Attendance
September 1	2:00 p.m.	vs. Bethune–Cookman*	Georgia State Stadium; Atlanta, GA (MEAC/SWAC Challenge)	ESPN2	L 15–36	23,333
September 7	6:00 p.m.	at South Alabama*	Ladd–Peebles Stadium; Mobile, AL	ESPN+	L 14–37	14,511
September 14	6:00 p.m.	vs. Tennessee State*	Liberty Bowl Memorial Stadium; Memphis, TN (Southern Heritage Classic)		W 49–44	48,347
September 28	3:00 p.m.	vs. Kentucky State*	Lucas Oil Stadium; Indianapolis, IN (Circle City Classic)	Facebook	L 25–33	10,345
October 5	6:00 p.m.	Grambling State*	Mississippi Veterans Memorial Stadium; Jackson, MS	ESPN3	L 21–44	32,265
October 12	2:00 p.m.	Alabama State^{†}	Mississippi Veterans Memorial Stadium; Jackson, MS	Facebook	L 16–31	35,013
October 19	2:00 p.m.	at Mississippi Valley State	Rice–Totten Stadium; Itta Bena, MS	ESPN3	W 31–28 ^{OT}	9,093
October 24	6:30 p.m.	at Prairie View A&M	Panther Stadium; Prairie View, TX	ESPNU	W 38–35 ^{2OT}	1,614
November 2	6:00 p.m.	Arkansas–Pine Bluff	Mississippi Veterans Memorial Stadium; Jackson, MS	Facebook	W 21–12	26,341
November 9	1:00 p.m.	at Alabama A&M	Louis Crews Stadium; Huntsville, AL	YouTube	L 43–48	5,326
November 16	2:00 p.m.	Southern	Mississippi Veterans Memorial Stadium; Jackson, MS (BoomBox Classic)	JSUTV	L 34–40	40,085
November 23	2:00 p.m.	Alcorn State	Mississippi Veterans Memorial Stadium; Jackson, MS (Soul Bowl)	ESPN3	L 6–41	35,104
*Non-conference game; ^{†}Homecoming; Rankings from STATS Poll released prior to the game; All times are in Central time

Schedule source:

== Game summaries ==
=== Vs. Bethune–Cookman ===
DATE: 9/1/2019

SITE: Atlanta, Ga.

STADIUM: GSU Stadium

ATTENDANCE: 23333

KICKOFF TIME: 3:00 pm

Bethune-Cookman defeated Jackson State 36-15 Sunday at the 15th MEAC/SWAC Challenge from Georgia State University Stadium. The Tigers' offense started quickly and showcased their ability to create the big play. On the second play of the game freshman quarterback Quincy Casey was flushed to the right and found Terrell Kennedy III wide open along the hash and put the Tigers in the red zone. Senior Adrian Salazar converted a field goal and put the Tigers up 3-0. The Tigers' defense controlled the game throughout the first half and held the Wildcats to 105 yards of total offense and forced four punts. On the Tigers second drive of the third quarter freshman quarterback Jalon Jones found Warren Newman for a 33-yard pitch and catch to put the Tigers up 15-7.

Despite the setback, JSU totaled 506 yards in total offense. That was the most since Oct. 24, 2015 when JSU defeated UAPB 37-3 and tallied 469 yards of offense. The last time the Tigers produced 500 yards of total offense was October 26, 2013 when JSU defeated Prairie View A&M 51-38. Nearly half of the 506 yards came on the ground. Senior Jordan Johnson rushed for a game-high 81 yards and scored a touchdown. Junior Keyshawn Harper added 60 yards and freshman Tyson Alexander rushed for 43 yards, including a long of 36 yards. The team finished with 233 rushing yards. Sophomore DD Bowie tallied a game-high 105 yards on five receptions and Newman added 49 yards receiving.

Junior quarterback Derrick Ponder passed for 130 yards and did not throw an interception. All-American linebacker Keonte Hampton added a game-high 11 tackles – seven solo stops and one tackle for loss. Seniors Quedarrion Barnett and CJ Anderson each sacked the quarterback. Senior Tyler Rogers and junior Jakaiszer Glass each finished with five tackles.

Game Recap: Dennis Driscoll, JSU Associate Athletic Director

	1	2	3	4	Total
Wildcats	0	0	22	14	36
Tigers	3	0	12	0	15

Scoring summary

Quarter	Time	Drive			Team	Scoring information	Score	
Quarter	Time	Plays	Yards	TOP	Team	Scoring information	COOK	JSU
1	12:35	6	60	2:25	JSU	25-yard field goal by Adrian Salazar	0	3
3	10:10	6	60	3:12	JSU	Jordan Johnson 8-yard touchdown run, Adrian Salazar kick blocked	0	9
3	7:18				COOK	Interception returned 50 yards for touchdown by Trevor Merritt, Xavier McDonald kick good	7	9
3	5:34	3	60	1:44	JSU	Warren Newman 34-yard touchdown reception from Jalon Jones, Adrian Salazar kick missed	7	12
3	4:09	5	57	1:25	COOK	Akevious Williams 20-yard touchdown run, Xavier McDonald kick good	14	15
3	2:33	3	9	0:59	COOK	Taron Mallard 1-yard touchdown reception from Akevious Williams, 2-point pass good	22	15
4	11:16	5	47	1:34	COOK	LaDerrien Wilson 5-yard touchdown run, Xavier McDonald kick good	29	15
4	9:01				COOK	Fumble recovery returned 96 yards for touchdown by Sam Marc, Xavier McDonald kick good	36	15
"TOP" = time of possession. For other American football terms, see Glossary of American football.							36	15

=== At South Alabama ===
	1	2	3	4	Total
Tigers	7	0	0	7	14
Jaguars	13	6	6	10	35

On the road and playing an opponent from the FBS, the Tigers played with the Jaguars from the opening kickoff until the final seconds melted off the clock.

South Alabama needed a huge second half to escape JSU 37-14. USA scored on its first possession of the game, but JSU countered with a drive of its own. The JSU offense orchestrated a 11-play, 75-yard drive that finished with a 6-yard touchdown pass from Derrick Ponder to Warren Newman. The Jaguars added two more scores (failed on both extra-point attempts) and went into halftime with a 19-7 advantage.

USA outscored JSU 18-7 in the second half to close-out the contest. Mobile native Keshawn Harper ran with pride and gutted the Jaguars for 77 yards on 10 carries, which accounted for 7.5 yards per carry. True freshman Tyson Alexander rushed for 44 yards and scored his first-career touchdown in the fourth quarter on a 30-yard dash down the USA sideline.

One JSU's goals was to limit USA dual-threat quarterback Cephus Johnson and for the most part did. Johnson, who accounted for over 250 yards of total offense and scored three touchdowns last week at Nebraska, was held to 150 yards and turned the ball over twice. JSU's defense forced three turnovers. CJ Holmes and Tenoa Alex each recorded an interception. Alex also forced a fumble and Jakaiszer Glass recovered it.

All-American linebacker Keonte Hampton finished with a game-high 15 tackles. Tyler Rogers added 10 stops and Quedarrion Barnett made seven tackles.

=== Vs. Tennessee State ===
	1	2	3	4	Total
JSU Tigers	21	7	14	7	49
TSU Tigers	7	7	9	21	44

Jackson State gashed Tennessee State for 338 yards on the ground and rolled to a 49-44 win at the 30th Southern Heritage Classic at the Liberty Bowl. The 49 points was the most points by Jackson State in the Southern Heritage Classic and ended a six-game losing streak in the series to TSU.

"I'm very proud of this team," JSU head coach John Hendrick said. "It wasn't pretty, but we did not give up and left it all on the field. We faced adversity and responded in a positive manner. We'll enjoy this win and take a week off, get better, and get ready for Kentucky State in the Circle City Classic." The first quarter started off with bang. Josh Littles took the opening kickoff back 100 yards, however, TSU responded with a 96-yard kickoff return of its own to knot the game at 7-7. The Tigers' remaining touchdowns in the first half were via the ground game.

Facing a third and long, the Tigers dialed up a designed quarterback draw and Derrick Ponder scampered for a 23-yard touchdown – untouched – as the momentum began to swing in favor of the Blue & White. With 1:08 remaining in the first quarter, Tyson Alexander scored on a 52-yard touchdown and JSU led 21-7. Jordan Johnson, who rushed for a game-high 141 yards and was named Southern Heritage Classic MVP, scored from four yards out with 1:18 remaining in the half. TSU scored in the waning moments of the half and JSU led 28-17 at the break.

The halftime didn't cool the offenses for either team. TSU opened the third quarter with a field goal and JSU countered with a five play, 39-yard drive that ended with a DD Bowie six-yard touchdown off an end-around. Bowie scored JSU's next touchdown, also a six-yard rush, but on a reverse to open a 42-30 lead. The Tigers final scoring drive of the game took 5:38 off the clock and Ponder found tight end Kyland Richey on a 16-yard pitch and catch. Keshawn Harper finished with 71 yards on seven carries from an average of 7.9 yards per attempt. All-American linebacker Keonte Hampton finished with a game-high nine tackles and added a sack. Tyler Rogers notched six stops and one sack.

Notes:

- The 49 point was the most points scored in a win since Sept. 6, 2014 when JSU defeated Virginia Lynchburg 59-0
- Jordan Johnson collected MVP honors for his 141-yard, one touchdown effort
- JSU won the possession battle 33:51 to 26:09
- The Blue & White was 10-of-14 on third down
- Neither team committed a turnover

=== Vs. Kentucky State ===
	1	2	3	4	Total
Thorobreds	6	14	13	0	33
Tigers	10	0	0	15	25

=== Grambling State ===
	1	2	3	4	Total
GRAM Tigers	0	10	14	20	44
JSU Tigers	0	7	7	7	21

=== Alabama State ===
	1	2	3	4	Total
Hornets	7	7	10	7	31
Tigers	3	7	0	6	16

=== At Mississippi Valley State ===
	1	2	3	4	OT	Total
Tigers	0	7	13	8	3	31
Delta Devils	7	14	0	7	0	28

=== At Prairie View A&M ===
	1	2	3	4	OT	2OT	Total
Tigers	6	16	3	3	7	3	38
Panthers	7	7	0	14	7	0	35

=== Arkansas–Pine Bluff ===
	1	2	3	4	Total
Golden Lions	0	0	12	0	12
Tigers	0	7	14	0	21

=== At Alabama A&M ===
	1	2	3	4	Total
Tigers	7	7	16	13	43
Bulldogs	3	10	7	28	48

=== Southern ===
	1	2	3	4	Total
Jaguars	7	10	16	7	40
Tigers	10	14	3	7	34

=== Alcorn State ===
	1	2	3	4	Total
Braves	7	24	7	3	41
Tigers	0	0	6	0	6
