= Jalon Daniels =

American football player (born 2002)

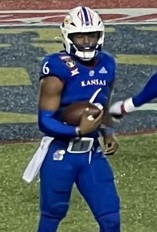
- Daniels with the Kansas Jayhawks in 2022

No. 10 – Tampa Bay Buccaneers
- Position: Quarterback
- Roster status: Active

Personal information
- Born: October 29, 2002 (age 24); Lawndale, California, U.S.
- Listed height: 6 ft 1 in (1.85 m)
- Listed weight: 219 lb (99 kg)

Career information
- High school: Lawndale
- College: Kansas (2020–2025)
- NFL draft: 2026: undrafted

Career history
- Tampa Bay Buccaneers (2026–present)

Awards and highlights
- Second-team All-Big 12 (2022)

Career NFL statistics as of Week 6, 2026
- Passing attempts: 98
- Passing completions: 60
- Completion percentage: 61.2%
- TD–INT: 3–5
- Passing yards: 501
- Passer rating: 63.4
- Stats at Pro Football Reference

Jalon Daniels (born October 29, 2002) is an American professional football quarterback for the Tampa Bay Buccaneers of the National Football League (NFL). He played college football for the Kansas Jayhawks and earned second-team All-Big 12 honors in 2022.

== Early life ==
Daniels was born in Lawndale, California, later attending Lawndale High School. He committed to the University of Kansas to play college football after previously committing to Middle Tennessee State University. Daniels also received offers from Air Force, Army, Louisiana, and Syracuse, among others, with Kansas and Syracuse being the only Power Five conference schools.

== College career ==
=== 2020 season ===
Daniels started six games for the Jayhawks his freshman year. Kansas went 0–9 that season. He completed 76 of 152 passes for 718 yards and threw for one touchdown and four interceptions.

=== 2021 season ===
Daniels lost out to Jason Bean for the starting quarterback position during camp. Following an injury to Bean in a November 6, game against Kansas State, Daniels filled in for Bean. He started for the Jayhawks the remainder of the season defeating Texas for only the second time since 1938, and the first time ever in Austin. The victory over Texas also ended multiple losing streaks: 8 straight overall losses, 18 straight within the Big 12, 20 straight to FBS opponents, and 56 straight in road conference games. The Jayhawks offense improved drastically after he became the starter in 2021, going from averaging 15.1 points per game to averaging 37.7. Despite the 1–2 record in his 3 starts, the Jayhawks were competitive in all three games, losing the two games by a combined score of 9. He finished the season with 860 yards, 7 touchdowns, and three interceptions.

=== 2022 season ===
Daniels earned the starting position entering his junior year. The Jayhawks 3–0 start was their best start since 2009. They also won their Big 12 conference opener for the first time since 2009. Daniels recorded five total touchdowns against Houston and 100 yards rushing. For his performance, he won multiple player of the week awards: Walter Camp Offensive Player of the Week, the Big 12 Offensive Player of the Week, and Manning Award Star of the Week. Kansas also received votes to be ranked for the first time since 2009. In the Jayhawks September 23 game against Duke, he threw for a what was at the time a career high in yards and passing touchdowns with 324 yards and 4 touchdowns. Following the performance, some sports writers called Daniels a candidate for the Heisman Trophy.

After leading the Jayhawks to a 5–0 record and their first ranking in the AP Poll since 2009, Daniels suffered a shoulder injury against TCU in the sixth game of the season. The injury was initially reported as season ending, but Daniels denied the report. He returned for the Jayhawks November 19 game against Texas. Following the conclusion of the regular season, he was named second-team All-Big 12, despite missing four games due to his shoulder injury. In the Jayhawks' 55–53 loss to Arkansas in the 2022 Liberty Bowl, Daniels set a program record for passing yards in a game with 544 yards. His performance was also a Liberty Bowl record.

=== 2023 season ===
Daniels was selected as the 2023 Big 12 Preseason Player of the Year, the first Kansas player to receive the award. He was also selected as a preseason First Team All-Big 12 quarterback. Daniels was named to the watch lists for the Davey O'Brien Award, the Walter Camp Award, and the Manning Award before the season. He missed the Jayhawks' opening game of the season due to an injury suffered during camp in the summer. He returned for the Jayhawks' second game against Illinois. He re-aggravated the back injury during warmups in the Jayhawks game against Texas causing him to miss the game. Daniels missed the rest of the season with the injury.

=== 2024 season ===
Daniels announced on November 16, 2023, he would return to Kansas for the 2024 season. The Jayhawks beat three ranked teams in a row and Devin Neal became the program's all-time leading rusher and set the school record for rushing touchdowns.

=== Statistics ===
Season	Team	Games			Passing								Rushing			
Season	Team	GP	GS	Record	Cmp	Att	Pct	Yds	Y/A	TD	Int	Rtg	Att	Yds	Avg	TD
2020	Kansas	7	6	0–6	76	152	50.0	718	4.7	1	4	86.6	74	24	0.3	3
2021	Kansas	6	3	1–2	81	117	69.2	860	7.4	7	3	145.6	33	83	2.5	3
2022	Kansas	9	9	5–4	152	230	66.1	2,014	8.8	18	4	152.0	77	425	5.5	7
2023	Kansas	3	3	3–0	56	75	74.7	705	9.4	5	1	173.0	27	74	2.7	0
2024	Kansas	12	12	5–7	171	300	57.0	2,454	8.2	14	12	133.1	93	439	4.7	6
2025	Kansas	12	12	5–7	198	319	62.1	2,531	7.9	22	7	147.1	117	404	3.5	4
Career		49	45	19–26	734	1,193	61.5	9,282	7.8	67	31	140.2	420	1,445	3.4	23

== Professional career ==
Pre-draft measurables
Height	Weight	Arm length	Hand span	Wingspan	40-yard dash	10-yard split	20-yard split
6 ft 0 5/8 in (1.84 m)	219 lb (99 kg)	30 3/8 in (0.77 m)	9 5/8 in (0.24 m)	6 ft 4 3/4 in (1.95 m)	4.65 s	1.63 s	2.69 s
All values from NFL Combine

Daniels signed with the Tampa Bay Buccaneers as an undrafted free agent on May 8, 2026. Daniels won the backup quarterback role in the preseason, beating out veteran Jake Browning. Daniels made his NFL debut on September 27, after Baker Mayfield was injured late in the 4th quarter against the Minnesota Vikings. Daniels threw an interception on a Hail Mary to end the game. Daniels made his first career start against the Green Bay Packers on October 4, completing 19–of–27 passes for 148 yards, one touchdown, and two interceptions in the 17–14 defeat. On October 8, Daniels won his first game as an NFL starter, completing 19–of–25 passes for 189 yards and a touchdown in a 24–16 upset win over the Dallas Cowboys; it was Tampa Bay's first win of the season.

== Career statistics ==
=== Regular season ===
Year	Team	Games			Passing									Rushing					Sacked		Fum	
Year	Team	GP	GS	Record	Cmp	Att	Pct	yds	Y/A	Lng	TD	Int	RTG	Att	yds	Y/A	Lng	TD	fmb	yds	fmb	lost
2026	TB	4	3	1–2	60	98	61.2	501	125.3	64	3	5	63.4	20	126	6.3	21	0	9	67	0	0
Career		4	3	1-2	60	98	61.2	501	125.3	64	3	5	63.4	20	126	6.3	21	0	9	67	0	0
