= 2023 Kansas Jayhawks football team =

American college football season

2023 Kansas Jayhawks football

Guaranteed Rate Bowl champion

Guaranteed Rate Bowl, W 49–36 vs. UNLV
- Conference: Big 12 Conference

Ranking
- Coaches: No. 23
- AP: No. 23
- Record: 9–4 (5–4 Big 12)
- Head coach: Lance Leipold (3rd season)
- Offensive coordinator: Andy Kotelnicki (Note: Kotelnicki served as offensive coordinator through the regular season. He was hired by Penn State in December. Jeff Grimes was hired as the replacement for the bowl game and the following season.) (3rd season)
- Co-offensive coordinator: Jim Zebrowski (1st (Note: Promoted to co-offensive coordinator for bowl game.) season)
- Offensive scheme: Multiple pro-style
- Defensive coordinator: Brian Borland (3rd season)
- Base defense: 4–3
- Captain: Jalon Daniels; Mike Novitsky; Mason Fairchild; Rich Miller
- Home stadium: David Booth Kansas Memorial Stadium

2023 Big 12 Conference football standings
	Conf.			Overall
Team	W		L	W		L
No. 3 Texas y$^	8	–	1	12	–	2
No. 16 Oklahoma State y	7	–	2	10	–	4
No. 15 Oklahoma	7	–	2	10	–	3
Iowa State	6	–	3	7	–	6
No. 18 Kansas State	6	–	3	9	–	4
West Virginia	6	–	3	9	–	4
Texas Tech	5	–	4	7	–	6
No. 23 Kansas	5	–	4	9	–	4
UCF	3	–	6	6	–	7
TCU	3	–	6	5	–	7
Houston	2	–	7	4	–	8
BYU	2	–	7	5	–	7
Baylor	2	–	7	3	–	9
Cincinnati	1	–	8	3	–	9
Championship: Texas 49, Oklahoma State 21
^ – College Football Playoff participant; $ – Conference champion; y – Championship game participant; Rankings from AP Poll

The 2023 Kansas Jayhawks football team represented the University of Kansas as a member of the Big 12 Conference during the 2023 NCAA Division I FBS football season. It was the 134th season of play in program history. Led by third-year head coach Lance Leipold, Kansas finished the season 9–4 overall and 5–4 in conference play, placing seventh in the Big 12. The Jayhawks defeated UNLV in the 2023 Guaranteed Rate Bowl for the program's first bowl game victory in 15 years. The team played home games at David Booth Kansas Memorial Stadium in Lawrence, Kansas.

The Jayhawks entered the season with their highest expectations in several years. They were picked ninth out of 14 teams in the conference, their highest selection since the Big 12 eliminated divisions. In the preseason Coaches poll released on August 7, Kansas received a vote to be ranked, marking their first appearance in a preseason poll since 2009. They also received 10 votes in the AP poll. They had four different players selected to the watch lists of seven awards and five preseason All-Big 12 selections. Quarterback Jalon Daniels was also named the preseason Player of the Year for the Big 12.

The Jayhawks won their first four games to start 4–0 in back-to-back seasons for the first time since starting 4–0 in three straight seasons from 1913 to 1915. After defeating sixth-ranked Oklahoma on October 28, Kansas became bowl eligible for the second consecutive season, which was the first time the Jayhawks were bowl eligible in back-to-back seasons since 2007 and 2008. The victory also gave the Jayhawks their first win over the Sooners since 1997, their first win over a top-ten team since defeating third-ranked Virginia Tech in the 2008 Orange Bowl, and their first win over a top-ten team at home since defeating second-ranked Oklahoma in 1984. The Jayhawks achieved a winning season in conference play, their first since 2007. Kansas finished the season ranked 23rd in the AP poll, their first time being ranked in the final AP poll since the 2007 season.

== Offseason ==
=== Coaching staff changes ===
The Jayhawks did not lose any members of their coaching staff from the previous season.

=== Starters lost ===
Starters are based on starters from the final game of the 2022 season. Players listed below have run out of eligibility. In total, the Jayhawks had four players run out of eligibility.

Name	Position
Earl Bostick Jr.	OL
Sam Burt	DL
Caleb Sampson	DL
Malcolm Lee	DE

=== Entered NFL draft ===
Name	Position
Lonnie Phelps	DE

=== Transfer portal ===
Incoming

Name	Position	Old school
Austin Booker	DE	Minnesota
Dylan Brooks	DE	Auburn
J. B. Brown	LB	Bowling Green
Logan Brown	T	Wisconsin
Patrick Joyner	ED	Utah State
Seth Keller	K	Texas State
Gage Keys	DL	Minnesota
Spencer Lowell	OT	California
Dylan McDuffie	RB	Georgia Tech
Damarius McGhee	CB	LSU
Devin Phillips	DL	Colorado State
Charlie Weinrich	K	Nebraska

Outgoing

Transfers listed below are only players who announced intention to transfer after the final regular season game of 2022.

Name	Position	New school
Jacob Borcila	K	Vanderbilt
Cam'ron Dabney	CB	Northern Illinois
Eriq Gilyard	LB	UConn
Steven McBride	WR	Hawaii
Jarrett Paul	S	Appalachian State
Gavin Potter	LB	Arkansas State
Ky Thomas	RB	Kent State
Edwin White	S	North Alabama

=== Recruiting ===
Website	4 star recruits	3 star recruits	Total recruits	Overall rank	Big 12 rank
247 Sports	0	12	12	76	14*
Rivals	0	12	12	81	14*

*Rivals and 247 Sports do not include the new teams joining the Big 12, however, their ranks in the overall rankings are being factored into the rank for Kansas.

Highest rated recruit

College recruiting
Name	Hometown	School	Height	Weight	Commit date
Jameel Croft; ATH	Detroit, MI	Martin Luther King	6 ft 2 in (1.88 m)	180 lb (82 kg)	Nov 3, 2022
Jameel Croft; ATH	Recruit ratings: Rivals: 247Sports:				

== Preseason ==
=== Big 12 preseason poll ===
The Big 12 preseason poll was released on July 6. Kansas was picked ninth in the conference, their first time not being selected in last place since the Big 12 eliminated divisions in 2010.

First place votes in parentheses.

Big 12 media poll
Predicted finish	Team	Points
1	Texas (41)	886
2	Kansas State (14)	858
3	Oklahoma (4)	758
4	Texas Tech (4)	729
5	TCU (3)	727
6	Baylor	572
7	Oklahoma State (1)	470
8	UCF	463
9	Kansas	461
10	Iowa State	334
11	BYU	318
12	Houston	215
13	Cincinnati	202
14	West Virginia	129

=== Preseason awards ===
QB Jalon Daniels

- 1st Team All-Big 12
- Big 12 Player of the Year
- Walter Camp Award watch list
- Davey O'Brien Award watch list
- Manning Award watch list

CB Cobee Bryant

- 1st Team All-Big 12
- Jim Thorpe Award watch list
- Bednarik Award watch list

RB Devin Neal

- 1st Team All-Big 12
- Doak Walker Award watch list

RB Daniel Hishaw Jr.

- Doak Walker Award watch list

C Mike Novitsky

- 1st team All-Big 12

== Schedule ==
Date	Time	Opponent	Rank	Site	TV	Result	Attendance
September 1	7:00 pm	Missouri State*		David Booth Kansas Memorial Stadium; Lawrence, KS	ESPN+	W 48–17	41,091
September 8	6:30 pm	Illinois*		David Booth Kansas Memorial Stadium; Lawrence, KS	ESPN2	W 34–23	45,809
September 16	9:30 pm	at Nevada*		Mackay Stadium; Reno, NV	CBSSN	W 31–24	16,890
September 23	2:30 pm	BYU		David Booth Kansas Memorial Stadium; Lawrence, KS	ESPN	W 38–27	47,233
September 30	2:30 pm	at No. 3 Texas	No. 24	Darrell K Royal–Texas Memorial Stadium; Austin, TX	ABC	L 14–40	102,986
October 7	3:00 pm	UCF		David Booth Kansas Memorial Stadium; Lawrence, KS	Fox	W 51–22	46,107
October 14	2:30 pm	at Oklahoma State	No. 23	Boone Pickens Stadium; Stillwater, OK	FS1	L 32–39	53,855
October 28	11:00 am	No. 6 Oklahoma^{†}		David Booth Kansas Memorial Stadium; Lawrence, KS (Big Noon Kickoff)	Fox	W 38–33	47,233
November 4	6:00 pm	at Iowa State	No. 21	Jack Trice Stadium; Ames, IA	ESPN	W 28–21	61,500
November 11	11:00 am	Texas Tech	No. 16	David Booth Kansas Memorial Stadium; Lawrence, KS	FS1	L 13–16	47,233
November 18	6:00 pm	No. 21 Kansas State	No. 25	David Booth Kansas Memorial Stadium; Lawrence, KS (Sunflower Showdown)	FS1	L 27–31	47,233
November 25	6:30 pm	at Cincinnati		Nippert Stadium; Cincinnati, OH	ESPN2	W 49–16	38,193
December 26	8:00 pm	vs. UNLV		Chase Field; Phoenix, AZ (Guaranteed Rate Bowl)	ESPN	W 49–36	26,478
*Non-conference game; ^{†}Homecoming; Rankings from AP Poll (and CFP Rankings, after October 31) - Released prior to game; All times are in Central time

== Rankings ==
Ranking movements Legend: ██ Increase in ranking ██ Decrease in ranking — = Not ranked RV = Received votes
	Week															
Poll	Pre	1	2	3	4	5	6	7	8	9	10	11	12	13	14	Final
AP	RV	—	RV	RV	24	RV	23	RV	—	22	19	RV	RV	RV	RV	23
Coaches	RV	RV	RV	RV	24	RV	24	RV	RV	23	18	RV	RV	RV	RV	23
CFP	Not released									21	16	25	—	—	—	Not released

== Game summaries ==
Rankings are from AP poll through Oklahoma game and the College Football Playoff poll beginning with the Iowa State game through the end of the season.

=== Missouri State ===
Favorite	Spread
Kansas	–32

Missouri State Bears at Kansas Jayhawks

Quarter	1	2	3	4	Total
Bears	7	3	0	7	17
Jayhawks	7	10	10	21	48

at David Booth Kansas Memorial Stadium • Lawrence, Kansas

- Date: Friday, September 1, 2023
- Game time: 7:00 pm CDT
- Game weather: Sunny • Temperature: 89 °F (32 °C)
- Game attendance: 41,091
- Referee: Henry Johns
- TV announcers (ESPN+): Chuckie Kempf, Ahman Green
- Gamebook

Game information

First quarter

- 11:26 KU Devin Neal 48 yard run (Seth Keller kick good), 4–70, 1:49 KU 7–0
- 2:24 MSU Jmariyae Robinson 2 yard pass from Jacob Clark (Owen Rozanc kick good), 10–46, 5:37 7–7

Second quarter

- 12:12 MSU Owen Rozanc 37 yard field goal, 7–53, 3:10 MSU 10–7
- 11:03 KU Luke Grimm 14 yard pass from Jason Bean (Seth Keller kick good), 3–75, 1:11 KU 14–10
- 1:05 KU Seth Keller 28 yard field goal, 10–75, 1:02 KU 17–10

Third quarter

- 10:29 KU Dylan McDuffie 17 yard run (Seth Keller kick good), 9–69, 4:22 KU 24–10
- 3:18 KU Seth Keller 35 yard field goal, 10–55, 5:07 KU 27–10

Fourth quarter

- 14:57 MSU Jmariyae Robinson 5 yard run (Owen Rozanc kick good), 6–75, 3:21 KU 27–17
- 10:18 KU Daniel Hishaw Jr. 24 yard run (Seth Keller kick good), 8–75, 4:39 KU 34–17
- 7:49 KU Devin Neal 6 yard pass from Jason Bean (Owen Piepergerdes kick good), 5–28, 2:21 KU 41–17
- 4:57 KU Sevion Morrison 5 yard Run (Seth Keller kick), 4–23, 2:14 KU 48–17

Statistics	MSU	KU
First downs	10	27
Plays–yards	48–217	66–521
Rushes–yards	27–74	38–245
Passing yards	143	276
Passing: comp–att–int	14–21–2	22–28–0
Turnovers		
Time of possession	26:13	33:47

Team	Category	Player	Statistics
Missouri State	Passing	Jacob Clark	14/21 143 yards 1 TD 2 INTa
Missouri State	Rushing	Jacob Clark	8 carries 36 yards
Missouri State	Receiving	Celdon Manning	2 receptions 31 yards
Kansas	Passing	Jason Bean	22/28 276 yards 2 TDs
Kansas	Rushing	Devin Neal	13 carries 94 yards 1 TD
Kansas	Receiving	Lawrence Arnold; Quentin Skinner	4 receptions 77 yards

The Jayhawks were without preseason conference player of the year Jalon Daniels who was still nursing an injury suffered in the Jayhawks bowl game the previous season. After trailing 10–7 early, the Jayhawks never trailed again. They would outscore the Bears 41–7 for the remainder of the game. It was the Jayhawks 3rd straight opening game win.

=== Illinois ===
Favorite	Spread
Kansas	–3.5

Illinois Fighting Illini at Kansas Jayhawks

Quarter	1	2	3	4	Total
Fighting Illini	0	7	8	8	23
Jayhawks	14	14	6	0	34

at David Booth Kansas Memorial Stadium • Lawrence, Kansas

- Date: Friday, September 8, 2023
- Game time: 6:30 pm CDT
- Game weather: Sunny • Temperature: 84 °F (29 °C)
- Game attendance: 45,809
- Referee: Larry Smith
- TV announcers (ESPN2): Anish Shroff, Andre Ware, Paul Carcaterra
- Gamebook

Game information

First quarter

- 9:20 KU Jalon Daniels 4 yard pass to Torry Locklin (Seth Keller kick good), 10—82, 4:21 KU 7–0
- 0:07 KU Jalon Daniels 5 yard pass to Jared Casey (Seth Keller kick good), 13–85, 6:35 KU 14–0

Second quarter

- 3:12 KU Devin Neal 5 yard run (Seth Keller kick good), 11–94, 6:35 KU 21–0
- 0:41 IU Luke Altmyer 4 yard pass to Tip Reiman (Caleb Griffin kick good), 7–75, 2:31 KU 21–7
- 0:05 KU Daniel Hishaw Jr. 1 yard run (Seth Keller kick good), 4–75, 0:36 KU 28–7

Third quarter

- 13:14 KU Seth Keller 41 yard field goal 5–45, 1:37 KU 31–7
- 3:46 KU Seth Keller 30 yard field goal 7–37, 3:14 KU 34–7
- 1:35 IU Luke Altmyer 72 yard run (Josh McCray run good), 5–75, 2:11 KU 34–15

Fourth quarter

- 8:08 IU KU Luke Altmyer 6 yard run (Reggie Love III pass to Luke Altmyer good) 11–80, 4:47 KU 34–23

Statistics	UI	KU
First downs	19	27
Plays–yards	56–341	65–539
Rushes–yards	18–139	44–262
Passing yards	202	277
Passing: comp–att–int	19–28–2	21–29–1
Turnovers		
Time of possession	23:21	36:39

Team	Category	Player	Statistics
Illinois	Passing	Luke Altmyer	19/28 202 yards 1 TD 2 INTs
Illinois	Rushing	Luke Altmyer	13 carries 70 yards 2 TDs
Illinois	Receiving	Isaiah Williams	6 receptions 99 yards
Kansas	Passing	Jalon Daniels	21/29 277 yards 2 TDs 1 INT
Kansas	Rushing	Devin Neal	10 carries 120 yards 1 TD
Kansas	Receiving	Lawrence Arnold	5 receptions 89 yards

The Jayhawks raced out to a 21–0 first half lead before allowing a touchdown, but Kansas responded to their first touchdown allowed with one themselves. The Illini would outscore the Jayhawks in the 2nd half 16-6 but it wouldn't be enough as the Jayhawks won 34–23.

=== at Nevada ===
Favorite	Spread
Kansas	–28

Kansas Jayhawks at Nevada Wolf Pack

Quarter	1	2	3	4	Total
Jayhawks	7	3	14	7	31
Wolf Pack	0	10	7	7	24

at Mackay Stadium • Reno, Nevada

- Date: Saturday, September 16, 2023
- Game time: 9:30 pm CDT / 7:30 pm PDT
- Game weather: Sunny • Temperature: 76 °F (24 °C)
- Game attendance: 16,890
- Referee: Derek Anderson
- TV announcers (CBSSN): Rich Waltz, Aaron Taylor
- Gamebook

Game information

First quarter

- KU 9:46 Devin Neal 3 yard run (Seth Keller kick good), 9–75, 5:14 KU 7–0

Second quarter

- UN 14:49 Brandon Talton 42 yard field goal, 9–24, 4:00 KU 7–3
- KU 8:55 Seth Keller 44 yard field goal 13–47, 5:54 KU 10–7
- UN 0:29 Sean Dollars 3 yard run (Brandon Talton kick good) 10–78, 4:55 10–10

Third quarter

- KU 5:07 Daniel Hishaw Jr. 1 yard run (Seth Keller kick good), 11–84, 4:41 KU 17–10
- UN 3:33 Brendon Lewis 6 yard run (Brandon Talton kick good) 4–65, 1:34 17–17
- KU 3:00 Devin Neal 1 yard run (Seth Keller kick good) 2–75, 0:33 KU 24–17

Fourth quarter

- UN 10:37 Brendon Lewis 2 yard run (Brandon Talton kick good) 14–75, 7:23 24–24
- KU 6:20 Devin Neal 3 yard run (Seth Keller kick good) 9–75, 4:17 KU 31–24

Statistics	KU	UN
First downs	24	14
Plays–yards	67–441	59–263
Rushes–yards	40–143	37–150
Passing yards	298	113
Passing: comp–att–int	21–27–0	15–22–0
Turnovers		
Time of possession	31:51	28:09

Team	Category	Player	Statistics
Kansas	Passing	Jalon Daniels	21/27 298 yards
Kansas	Rushing	Devin Neal	17 carries 89 yards 3 TDs
Kansas	Receiving	Mason Fairchild	5 receptions 74 yards
Nevada	Passing	Brendon Lewis	15/22 113 carries
Nevada	Rushing	Brendon Lewis	11 carries 58 yards
Nevada	Receiving	Dalevon Campbell	1 reception 53 yards

Despite entering the game as a 4 touchdown favorite, the Jayhawks struggled early in the game. It was 10–10 at halftime. In the second half, the teams traded touchdowns, but in the end the Jayhawks would score the game winning touchdown with 6 minutes left to win.

=== BYU ===
Favorite	Spread
Kansas	–9

BYU Cougars at Kansas Jayhawks

Quarter	1	2	3	4	Total
Cougars	7	10	3	7	27
Jayhawks	14	0	14	10	38

at David Booth Kansas Memorial Stadium • Lawrence, Kansas

- Date: Saturday, September 23, 2023
- Game time: 2:30 pm CDT
- Game weather: Cloudy • Temperature: 80 °F (27 °C)
- Game attendance: 47,233
- Referee: Stephen Baron
- TV announcers (ESPN): Mark Jones, Louis Riddick, Quint Kessenich
- Gamebook

Game information

First quarter

- KU 10:38 Cobee Bryant 22 yard fumble return (Seth Keller kick good) KU 7–0
- BYU 5:48 Kedon Slovis 7 yard pass to Darius Lassiter (Will Ferrin kick good) 10–75, 4:50 7–7
- KU 1:33 Jalon Daniels 15 yard pass to Trevor Kardell (Seth Keller kick good) 8–86, 4:15 KU 14–7

Second quarter

- BYU 11:00 Kedon Slovis 10 yard pass to L. J. Martin (Will Ferrin kick good) 13–75, 5:33 14–14
- BYU 0:13 Will Ferrin 33 yard field goal 12–68, 4:05 BYU 17–14

Third quarter

- KU 14:38 Kenny Logan Jr. 30 yard interception return (Seth Keller kick good) KU 21–17
- BYU 10:55 Will Ferrin 34 yard field goal 8–58, 3:43 KU 21–21
- KU 4:53 Jalon Daniels 5 yard pass to Luke Grimm (Seth Keller kick good) 10–75, 6:05 KU 28–20

Third quarter

- KU 13:36 Jalon Daniels pass to Luke Grimm (Seth Keller kick good) 7–64, 3:38 KU 35–20
- BYU 8:02 Keelan Marion 6 yard run (Will Ferrin kick good) 12–75, 5:34 KU 35–27
- KU 1:33 Seth Keller 23 yard field goal 12–69, 6:26 KU 38–27

Statistics	BYU	KU
First downs	23	23
Plays–yards	56–351	73–366
Rushes–yards	22–9	37–221
Passing yards	357	130
Passing: comp–att–int	30–51–2	14–19–0
Turnovers		
Time of possession	30:05	29:55

Team	Category	Player	Statistics
BYU	Passing	Kedon Slovis	30/51 357 yards 2 TDs 2 INTs
BYU	Rushing	L. J. Martin	11 carries 28 yards
BYU	Receiving	Chase Roberts	5 receptions 89 yards
Kansas	Passing	Jalon Daniels	14/19 130 yards 3 TDs
Kansas	Rushing	Devin Neal	17 carries 91 yards
Kansas	Receiving	Lawrence Arnold	4 receptions 31 yards

Kansas was Big 12 newcomer BYU's first conference game. The teams traded touchdown early before BYU took a 3-point halftime lead. The Jayhawks would go on a 21–3 run to take the lead. Kansas would win 38–27 to start the season 4–0.

=== at No. 3 Texas ===
Favorite	Spread
Texas	–15.5

No. 24 Kansas Jayhawks at No. 3 Texas Longhorns

Quarter	1	2	3	4	Total
No. 24 Jayhawks	0	7	7	0	14
No. 3 Longhorns	10	3	13	14	40

at Darrell K Royal–Texas Memorial Stadium • Austin, Texas

- Date: Saturday, September 30, 2023
- Game time: 2:30 pm CDT
- Game weather: Sunny • Temperature: 91 °F (33 °C)
- Game attendance: 102,986
- Referee: Kevin Boitmann
- TV announcers (ABC): Sean McDonough, Greg McElroy, Molly McGrath
- Gamebook

Game information

First quarter

- UT 10:06 Quinn Ewers run for 30 yards for a touchdown (Bert Auburn kick good) 7–88, 2:45 UT 7–0
- UT 1:52 Bert Auburn 26 yard field goal 14–76, 6:26 UT 10–0

Second quarter

- KU 14:05 Daniel Hishaw Jr. 18 yard run (Seth Keller kick good) 5–75, 2:02 UT 10–7
- UT 11:15 Bert Auburn 30 yard field goal 5–63, 3:35 UT 13–7

Third quarter

- UT 13:28 Jonathon Brooks 54 yard run (Bert Auburn kick good) 4–71, 1:32 UT 20–7
- KU 11:36 Jason Bean 58 yard pass to Trevor Wilson (Seth Keller kick good) 4–75, 1:52 UT 20–14
- UT 2:33 Jonathon Brooks 1 yard run (Quinn Ewers pass incomplete) 5–32, 1:52 UT 26–14

Fourth quarter

- UT 13:06 Quinn Ewers 9 yard pass (Bert Auburn kick good) 8–72, 3:25 UT 33–14
- 5:34 Quinn Ewers 1 yard run (Bert Auburn kick good) 12–75, 5:51 UT 40–14

Statistics	KU	UT
First downs	11	33
Plays–yards	46–260	86–661
Rushes–yards	25–124	51–335
Passing yards	136	325
Passing: comp–att–int	9–21–0	25–35–1
Turnovers		
Time of possession	20:19	39:41

Team	Category	Player	Statistics
Kansas	Passing	Jason Bean	9/21 136 yards 1 TD
Kansas	Rushing	Devin Neal	8 carries 45 yards
Kansas	Receiving	Trevor Wilson	1 reception 58 yards 1 TD
Texas	Passing	Quinn Ewers	25/35 325 yards 1 TD 1 INT
Texas	Rushing	Jonathan Brooks	21 carries 218 yards 2 TDs
Texas	Receiving	Adonai Mitchell	10 receptions 141 yards 1 TD

The Jayhawks and Longhorns played each other as ranked teams for the first time in the history of the series. It was also the final matchup before Texas leaves the Big 12 for the SEC. Quarterback Jalon Daniels re-aggravated a preseason back injury in warmups and did not play. The Jayhawks kept the game close early, until the second half when they were outscored 27–7 giving the Jayhawks their first loss of the season.

=== UCF ===
Favorite	Spread
UCF	–2

UCF Knights at Kansas Jayhawks

Quarter	1	2	3	4	Total
Knights	0	0	8	14	22
Jayhawks	3	21	13	14	51

at David Booth Kansas Memorial Stadium • Lawrence, Kansas

- Date: Saturday, October 7, 2023
- Game time: 3:00 pm CDT
- Game weather: Sunny • Temperature: 64 °F (18 °C)
- Game attendance: 46,107
- Referee: Tutashinda Salaam
- TV announcers (Fox): Jason Benetti, Brock Huard
- Gamebook

Game information

First quarter

- 3:43 KU Seth Keller 25 yard field goal 13–82, 7:03 KU 3–0

Second quarter

- 13:43 KU Jason Bean 5 yard pass to Lawrence Arnold (Seth Keller kick good) 9–69, 4:22 KU 10–0
- 6:31 KU Daniel Hishaw Jr. 3 yard run (Seth Keller kick good) 12–72, 6:13 KU 17–0
- 3:26 KU Trevor Wilson 82 yard punt return (Seth Keller kick good) KU 24–0

Third quarter

- 14:48 KU Devin Neal 75 run (Seth Keller kick good) 1–75, 0:12 KU 31–0
- 13:01 UCF Timmy McClain 13 yard pass to Alec Holler (Timmy McClain pass incomplete) 4–75, 1:47 KU 31–6
- 7:02 KU Dylan McDuffie 1 yard run 4–17, 3:05 KU 37–6
- UCF Demari Henderson blocked extra point attempt returned for 2 point conversion KU 37–8

Fourth quarter

- 13:55 UCF R. J. Harvey 4 yard run (Colton Boomer kick good) 17–75, 8:07 KU 37–15
- 11:47 KU Daniel Hishaw Jr. 7 yard run (Seth Keller kick good) 4–54, 2:02 KU 44–15
- 10:09 UCF Timmy McClain 23 yard pass (Colton Boomer kick good) 5–75, 1:39 KU 44–22
- 0:53 KU Dylan McDuffie 1 yard (Owen Piepergerdes kick good) 7–35, 3:20 KU 51–22

Statistics	UCF	KU
First downs	21	25
Plays–yards	81–371	63–490
Rushes–yards	38–202	51–399
Passing yards	169	91
Passing: comp–att–int	15–23–0	8–12–0
Turnovers		
Time of possession	25:35	34:25

Team	Category	Player	Statistics
UCF	Passing	Timmy McClain	12/15 136 yards 2 TDs
UCF	Rushing	R. J. Harvey	16 carries 133 yards 1 TD
UCF	Receiving	Javon Baker	4 receptions 85 yards
Kansas	Passing	Jason Bean	8/12 91 yards 1 TD
Kansas	Rushing	Devin Neal	12 carries 154 yards 1 TD
Kansas	Receiving	Luke Grimm	2 receptions 41 yards

In the Jayhawks first ever meeting with new Big 12 member UCF, they jumped out to an early 31–0 lead despite Jalon Daniels being out for the 2nd straight week. UCF would only manage 3 touchdowns, while the Jayhawks would score 51 points. Their 28 point margin of victory was the largest in a conference game since defeated rival Kansas State by 31 in 2008.

=== at Oklahoma State ===
Favorite	Spread
Kansas	–3

No. 23 Kansas Jayhawks at Oklahoma State Cowboys

Quarter	1	2	3	4	Total
No. 23 Jayhawks	7	18	7	0	32
Cowboys	17	7	3	12	39

at Boone Pickens Stadium • Stillwater, Oklahoma

- Date: Saturday, October 14, 2023
- Game time: 2:30 pm CDT
- Game weather: Sunny • Temperature: 62 °F (17 °C)
- Game attendance: 53,855
- Referee: Kevin Mar
- TV announcers (FS1): Jeff Levering, Mark Helfrich
- Gamebook

Game information

First quarter

- 13:11 OSU Alan Bowman 17 yard pass to Ollie Gordon II (Alex Hale kick good) 5–77, 1:45 OSU 7–0
- 7:25 OSU Alan Bowman 20 yard pass to Brennan Presley (Alex Hale kick good) 9–83, 3:00 OSU 14–0
- 5:14 KU Jason Bean 47 yard pass to Trevor Wilson (Seth Keller kick good) 5—75, 2:11 OSU 14–6

Second quarter

- 12:42 KU Jason Bean 30 yard pass to Mason Fairchild (Seth Keller kick blocked) 9–75, 4:28 OSU 14–13
- 10:41 KU Jason Bean 44 yard pass to Mason Fairchild (Grayden Addison run failed) 2–72, 0:44 KU 19–14
- 2:52 OSU Ollie Gordon II 42 yard run (Alex Hale kick good) 2–53 0:48, OSU 21–19
- 2:10 OSU Alex Hale 28 yard field goal 8–64, 3;04 OSU 24–19
- 1:06 KU Jason Bean 49 pass to Quentin Skinner (Jason Bean pass no good) 5–75, 1:46 KU 25–24

Third quarter

- 11:13 KU Jason Bean 42 yard pass to Quentin Skinner (Owen Piepergerdes kick good) 8–75, 3:42 KU 32–24
- 5:28 OSU Alex Hale 26 yard field goal 13–66, 5:28 KU 32–27

Fourth quarter

- 11:32 OSU Alex Hale 21 yard field goal 10–74, 4:52 KU 32–30
- 2:33 OSU Brennan Presley 6 yard run (Alan Bowman pass failed) 9–50, 3:50 OSU 36–32
- 0:15 OSU Alex Hale 46 yard field goal 4–9, 1:42 OSU 39–32

Statistics	KU	OSU
First downs	19	27
Plays–yards	63–500	79–554
Rushes–yards	29–90	38–219
Passing yards	410	336
Passing: comp–att–int	23–34–2	28–41–0
Turnovers		
Time of possession	28:29	31:31

Team	Category	Player	Statistics
Kansas	Passing	Jason Bean	23/34 410 yards 5 TDs 2 INTs
Kansas	Rushing	Devin Neal	13 carries 66 yards
Kansas	Receiving	Mason Fairchild	5 receptions 92 yards 2 TDs
Oklahoma State	Passing	Alan Bowman	28/41 336 yards 2 TDs
Oklahoma State	Rushing	Ollie Gordon II	29 carries 168 yards 1 TD
Oklahoma State	Receiving	Ollie Gordon II	6 carries 116 yards 1 TD

The Jayhawks fell into an early 14–0 deficit. Despite two special teams miscues resulting in mixed extra points, they fought back to gain a 19–17 lead. After trading touchdowns but KU missing a 2-point conversion attempt, the Jayhawks took a slim 2 point into halftime. The Cowboys outscored the Jayhawks 15–7 in the second half, partially due to two interceptions from quarterback Jason Bean leading to the Jayhawks loss.

=== No. 6 Oklahoma ===
Favorite	Spread
Oklahoma	–8

No. 6 Oklahoma Sooners at Kansas Jayhawks

Quarter	1	2	3	4	Total
No. 6 Sooners	0	21	6	6	33
Jayhawks	7	10	9	12	38

at David Booth Kansas Memorial Stadium • Lawrence, Kansas

- Date: Saturday, October 28, 2023
- Game time: 11:00 am CDT
- Game weather: Cloudy • Temperature: 38 °F (3 °C)
- Game attendance: 47,233
- Referee: Michael VanderVelde
- TV announcers (Fox): Jason Benetti, Brock Huard, Allison Williams
- Gamebook

Game information

First quarter

- 9:25 KU Mello Dotson 37 yard interception return (Seth Keller kick good) KU 7–0

Second quarter

- 14:06 KU Daniel Hishaw 9 yard run (Seth Keller kick good) 10–79, 14:06 KU 14–0
- 10:15 OU Dillon Gabriel 7 yard run (Zach Schmidt kick good) 10–75, 3:54 KU 14–7
- 6:05 OU Tawee Walker 2 yard run (Zach Schmidt kick good) 9–66, 3:11 14–14
- 4:23 OU Dillon Gabriel 9 yard run (Zach Schmidt kick good) 4–17, 1:38 OU 21–14
- 0:50 KU Seth Keller 24 yard field goal 12–79, 3:26 OU 21–17

Third quarter

- 4:01 KU Seth Keller 29 yard field goal 5–45, 2:45 OU 21–20
- 3:03 KU Jason Bean 38 yard run (Jason Bean pass failed) 1–38, 0:08 KU 26–21
- 0:35 OU Gavin Sawchuk 3 yard run (Dillon Gabriel pass failed) 7–75, 2:28 OU 27–26

Fourth quarter

- 12:25 KU Daniel Hishaw 1 yard run (Jason Bean pass failed) 7–65, 3:03 KU 32–27
- 5:22 OU Dillon Gabriel 1 yard run (Dillon Gabriel pass failed) 4–14, 1:23 OU 33–32
- 0:55 KU Devin Neal 9 yard run (Devin Neal run failed) 7–80, 1:01 KU 38–33

Statistics	OU	KU
First downs	19	25
Plays–yards	74–440	73–443
Rushes–yards	55–269	41–225
Passing yards	171	218
Passing: comp–att–int	14–19–1	15–32–2
Turnovers		
Time of possession	28:50	31:10

Team	Category	Player	Statistics
Oklahoma	Passing	Dillon Gabriel	14/19 171 yards 1 INT
Oklahoma	Rushing	Tawee Walker	23 carries 146 yards 1 TD
Oklahoma	Receiving	Drake Stoops	4 receptions 76 yards
Kansas	Passing	Jason Bean	15/32 218 yards 2 INTs
Kansas	Rushing	Devin Neal	25 carries 112 yards 1 TD
Kansas	Receiving	Lawrence Arnold	3 receptions 79 yards

In the last matchup with the Sooners before they leave for the SEC, Kansas got out to a 14–0 lead. Oklahoma responded with a 21–0 run to take a 21–17 lead into halftime. KU would go on a 9–0 run to start the second half. The teams traded touchdowns. Kansas got the ball with 1:56 left. They marched down the field to score the game winning touchdown with 55 seconds left to become bowl eligible. The win was also the Jayhawks first win over Oklahoma since 1997, first win over top 10 team at home since 1984, and first win over a top 10 team period since 2008.

=== at Iowa State ===
Favorite	Spread
Iowa State	–3

No. 21 Kansas Jayhawks at Iowa State Cyclones

Quarter	1	2	3	4	Total
No. 21 Jayhawks	7	7	7	7	28
Cyclones	0	3	8	10	21

at Jack Trice Stadium • Ames, Iowa

- Date: Saturday, November 4, 2023
- Game time: 6:00 pm CDT
- Game weather: Clear • Temperature: 58 °F (14 °C)
- Game attendance: 61,500
- Referee: Tutashinda Salaam
- TV announcers (ESPN): Mike Monaco, Robert Griffin III

Game information

First quarter

KU ISU

- 8:40 KU Devin Neal 6 yard run (Seth Keller kick good) 9–86, 4:32 KU 7–0

Second quarter

- 10:21 KU Mello Dotson 50 yard interception return (Seth Keller kick good) KU 14–0
- 0:03 ISU Chase Contreraz 35 yard field goal 7–50, 0:38 KU 14–3

Third quarter

- 9:24 KU Devin Neal 1 yard run (Owen Piepergerdes kick) 11–75, 5:36 KU 21–3
- 3:59 ISU Eli Sanders 6 yard run (Eli Sanders run good) 9–75, 5:25 KU 21–11

Fourth quarter

- 8:11 ISU Rocco Becht 2 yard run (Chase Contreraz kick good) 12–90, 6:57 KU 21–18
- 7:51 KU Jason Bean 80 yard pass to Lawrence Arnold (Owen Piepergerdes kick good) 1–80, 0:20 KU 28–18
- 4:53 ISU Chase Contreraz 29 yard field goal 7–64, 2:58 KU 28–21

Statistics	KU	ISU
First downs	16	16
Plays–yards	58–361	56–333
Rushes–yards	35–74	29–75
Passing yards	287	258
Passing: comp–att–int	14–23–0	21–27–1
Turnovers		
Time of possession	30:27	29:33

Team	Category	Player	Statistics
Kansas	Passing	Jason Bean	14/23 287 yards 1 TD
Kansas	Rushing	Devin Neal	21 carries 57 yards 2 TDs
Kansas	Receiving	Lawrence Arnold	3 receptions 112 yards 1 TD
Iowa State	Passing	Rocco Becht	20/26 216 yards 1 INT
Iowa State	Rushing	Eli Sanders	14 carries 57 yards 1 TD
Iowa State	Receiving	Dimitri Stanley	5 receptions 58 yards

The Jayhawks jumped out to a 14 point lead before Iowa State scored their first points, a field goal. Kansas would open the 2nd half with a touchdown to take a 21–3 lead. Iowa State responded with a 15–0 to make the game 21–18. Kansas followed up an Iowa State touchdown and 2 point conversion with an 80 yard touchdown to take a 28–18 lead. Iowa State would kick a field goal but wouldn't have enough in the end. It was KU's first road win against Iowa State since 2008 and first win as a ranked team since 2009. The win also gave KU their first 7 win season since 2008.

=== Texas Tech ===
Favorite	Spread
Kansas	–4

Texas Tech at No. 16 Kansas Jayhawks

Quarter	1	2	3	4	Total
Red Raiders	10	0	3	3	16
No. 16 Jayhawks	0	0	0	13	13

at David Booth Kansas Memorial Stadium • Lawrence, Kansas

- Date: Saturday, November 11, 2023
- Game time: 11:00 am CST
- Game weather: Cloudy • Temperature: 53 °F (12 °C)
- Game attendance: 47,233
- Referee: Derek Anderson
- TV announcers (FS1): Eric Collins, Devin Gardner
- Game summary

Game information

First quarter

- 10:18 TTU Tahj Brooks 5 yard run (Gino Garcia kick good) 7–50, 2:54 TTU 7–0
- 3:24 TTU Gino Garcia 32 yard field goal 15–42, 5:22 TTU 10–0

Second quarter

No scoring

Third quarter

- 2:56 TTU Gino Garcia 31 yard field goal 8–22, 3:42 TTU 13–0

Fourth quarter

- 12:12 KU Devin Neal 60 yard run (Seth Keller kick good) 4–70, 1:42 TTU 13–7
- 4:42 KU Seth Keller 24 yard field goal 11–71, 4:57 TTU 13–10
- 0:25 KU Seth Keller 22 yard field goal 14–77, 1:55 13–13
- 0:03 TTY Gino Garcia 30 yard field goal 4–63, 0:26 TTU 16–13

Statistics	TTU	KU
First downs	21	18
Plays–yards	69–312	70–344
Rushes–yards	44–136	45–207
Passing yards	176	137
Passing: comp–att–int	19–25–1	10–25–1
Turnovers		
Time of possession	31:23	28:37

Team	Category	Player	Statistics
Texas Tech	Passing	Behren Morton	19/25 176 yards 1 INT
Texas Tech	Rushing	Tahj Brooks	33 carries 133 yards 1 TD
Texas Tech	Receiving	Jerand Bradley	4 receptions 91 yards
Kansas	Passing	Cole Ballard	9/24 120 yards 1 INT
Kansas	Rushing	Devin Neal	19 carries 137 yards 1 TD
Kansas	Receiving	Lawrence Arnold	2 receptions 44 yards

The Jayhawks, already down starter Jalon Daniels, lost backup Jason Bean to injury early in the game. Texas Tech jumped to an early 13–0 lead before Kansas scored their first points on a 60 yard touchdown. After two Seth Keller field goals, the score was tied with 25 seconds left. Texas Tech would march down the field quickly to kick a game winning field goal with 3 seconds.

=== No. 21 Kansas State ===
Favorite	Spread
Kansas State	–6.5

No. 21 Kansas State Wildcats at No. 25 Kansas Jayhawks

Quarter	1	2	3	4	Total
No. 21 Wildcats	7	9	8	7	31
No. 25 Jayhawks	7	13	7	0	27

at David Booth Kansas Memorial Stadium • Lawrence, Kansas

- Date: Saturday, November 18, 2023
- Game time: 6:00 pm CST
- Game weather: Sunny • Temperature: 55 °F (13 °C)
- Game attendance: 47,233
- Referee: David Alvarez
- TV announcers (FS1): Alex Faust, Petros Papadakis
- Game summary

Game information

First quarter

- 13:44 KSU Will Howard 11 yard pass Ben Sinnott (Chris Tennant kick good) 5–75, 1:16 KSU 7–0
- 2:05 KU Devin Neal 36 yard run (Seth Keller kick good) 11–82, 6:10 7–7

Second quarter

- 10:55 KU Devin Neal 9 yard run (Seth Keller kick blocked) 8–76, 4:28 KU 13–7
- KSU Keenan Garber blocked extra point returned for a two point conversion KU 13–9
- 7:24 KSU Will Howard 11 pass to Keagan Johnson (Chris Tennant kick good) 8–75, 3:33 KSU 16–13
- 0:26 KU Cole Ballard 5 yard pass to Lawrence Arnold (Seth Keller kick good) 13–75, 7:00 KU 20–16

Third quarter

- 13:28 KU Devin Neal 2 yard run (Seth Keller kick good) 3–65, 1:32 KU 27–16
- 6:35 KU D. J. Giddens 1 yard run (Will Howard run good) 10–87, 4:01 KU 27–24

Fourth quarter

- 10:22 KSU Will Howard 15 yard run (Chris Tennant kick good) 6–55, 3:01 KSU 31–27

Statistics	KSU	KU
First downs	20	19
Plays–yards	61–331	57–396
Rushes–yards	37–166	41–234
Passing yards	165	162
Passing: comp–att–int	13–24–1	11–16–2
Turnovers		
Time of possession	26:40	33:20

Team	Category	Player	Statistics
Kansas State	Passing	Will Howard	13/24 165 yards 2 TDs 1 INT
Kansas State	Rushing	D. J. Giddens	21 carries 102 yards 1 TD
Kansas State	Receiving	Jayce Brown	4 receptions 96 yards
Kansas	Passing	Cole Ballard	11/16 162 yards 1 TD 2 INTs
Kansas	Rushing	Devin Neal	18 carries 138 yards 3 TD
Kansas	Receiving	Mason Fairchild	1 reception 59 yards

In the first matchup in Sunflower Showdown with both teams ranked in 28 years, the teams traded scores early in the game. In the beginning of the second half, Kansas took an 11 point lead. K-State would come back to win the game. It was the 15th straight loss for KU in the rivalry. The loss also officially eliminated Kansas' slim hopes to play in the Big 12 championship game.

=== at Cincinnati ===
Favorite	Spread
Kansas	–7

Kansas Jayhawks at Cincinnati Bearcats

Quarter	1	2	3	4	Total
Jayhawks	0	21	7	21	49
Bearcats	3	7	0	6	16

at Nippert Stadium • Cincinnati, Ohio

- Date: Saturday, November 25, 2023
- Game time: 6:30 pm CST / 7:30 pm EST
- Game weather: Clear • Temperature: 39 °F (4 °C)
- Game attendance: 38,193
- Referee: Kevin Boitman
- TV announcers (ESPN2): John Schriffen, Rocky Boiman
- Gamebook

Game information

First quarter

- 8:12 UC Carter Brown 49 yard field goal 12–44, 6:48 UC 3–0

Second quarter

- 8:55 KU Devin Neal 13 yard run (Seth Keller kick good) 5–77, 2:38 KU 7–3
- 5:31 KU Jason Bean 15 yard pass to Jared Casey (Seth Keller kick good) 5–66, 2:22 KU 14–3
- 0:26 UC Emory Jones 11 yard pass Ryan Montgomery (Carter Brown kick good) 13–75, 5:05 KU 14–10
- 0:05 KU Jason Bean 26 yard pass to Mason Fairchild (Seth Keller kick good) 2–56, 0:17 KU 21–10

Third quarter

- 11:53 KU Devin Neal 30 yard run (Seth Keller kick good) 8–75, 3:07 KU 28–10

Fourth quarter

- 13:23 UC Ryan Montgomery 7 yard pass to Dee Wiggins (Emory Jones run no good) 12–67, 5:58 KU 28–16
- 11:39 KU Jason Bean 43 yard run (Seth Keller kick good) 3–79, 1:37 KU 35—16
- 9:52 KU Jason Bean 50 yard run (Seth Keller kick good) 2–59, 0:55 KU 42–16
- 0:47 KU Dylan McDuffie 6 yard run (Owen Piepergerdes kick good) 11–61, 7:01 KU 49–16

Statistics	KU	UC
First downs	23	21
Plays–yards	51–562	73–342
Rushes–yards	34–312	42–231
Passing yards	250	111
Passing: comp–att–int	13–17–0	16–31–1
Turnovers		
Time of possession	27:19	32:41

Team	Category	Player	Statistics
Kansas	Passing	Jason Bean	13/17 250 yards 2 TDs
Kansas	Rushing	Devin Neal	10 carries 106 yards 2 TDs
Kansas	Receiving	Lawrence Arnold	3 receptions 74 yards
Cincinnati	Passing	Emory Jones	15/27 104 yards 1 TD 1 INT
Cincinnati	Rushing	Corey Kiner	18 carries 106 yards
Cincinnati	Receiving	Dee Wiggins	4 receptions 27 yards

In their first conference game again Big 12 newcomer Cincinnati, Kansas would only trail for briefly. The Jayhawks scored their first touchdown halfway through the second quarter and followed it up with another touchdown. The Jayhawks would pull away in the 4th quarter following two Jason Bean touchdown runs to win 49–16. The win gave the Jayhawks their first 8 more win regular season since 2007. It also gave the Jayhawks their most conference wins since winning 7 in 2007. It also gave the Jayhawks as many conference wins as the previous four seasons combined.

=== UNLV ===
Favorite	Spread
KU	–10.5

2023 Guaranteed Rate Bowl Kansas Jayhawks vs UNLV Rebels

Quarter	1	2	3	4	Total
Jayhawks	7	21	0	21	49
Rebels	7	3	14	12	36

at Chase Field • Phoenix, Arizona

- Date: Tuesday, December 26, 2023
- Game time: 8:00 pm CST / 7:00 pm MST
- Game weather: None (retractable roof closed)
- Game attendance: 26,478
- Referee: Tim Hedgepeth
- TV announcers (ESPN): Beth Mowins, Kirk Morrison
- Gamebook

Game information

First quarter

- UNLV 11:07 Vincent Davis Jr. 3 yard run (Jose Pizano kick good) 8–65, 3:53 UNLV 7–0
- KU 2:05 Jason Bean 6 yard pass Luke Grimm (Seth Keller kick good) 9–98, 4:48 7–7

Second quarter

- KU 11:37 Jason Bean 60 yard pass to Luke Grimm (Seth Keller kick good) 4–65 yards, 2:38 KU 14–7
- KU 7:57 Jason Bean 15 yard pass to Lawrence Arnold (Seth Keller kick good) 5–66 yards, 1:19 KU 21–7
- KU 1:21 Devin Neal 1 yard run (Seth Keller kick good) 8–70 yards, 3:42 KU 28–7
- UNLV 0:00 Jose Pizano 40 yard field goal 5–38, 1:21 KU 28–10

Third quarter

- UNLV 12:15 Jayden Maiava 5 yard pass to Shelton Zeon III (Jose Pizano kick good) 5–42, 1:44 KU 28–17
- UNLV 10:30 Jayden Maiava 37 yard pass to (Jose Pizano kick good) 1–37, 0:07 KU 28–24

Fourth quarter

- KU 14:52 Jason Bean 40 yard pass to Lawrence Arnold (Seth Keller kick good) 10–99, 6:53 KU 35–24
- UNLV 12:06 Jacob De Jesus 11 yard run (Jayden Maiava run failed) 7–88, 2:46 KU 35–30
- KU 11:10 Jason Bean 56 yard pass to Lawrence Arnold (Seth Keller kick good) 2–61, 0:56 KU 42–30
- KU 8:16 Jason Bean 43 yard pass to Luke Grimm (Seth Keller kick good) 3–46, 1:33 49–30
- UNLV 6:27 Jayden Maiava 50 yard pass to Senika McKie (Vincent Davis run failed) 5–80, 1:49 KU 49–36

Statistics	KU	UNLV
First downs	22	22
Plays–yards	591	386
Rushes–yards	142	95
Passing yards	449	291
Passing: comp–att–int	19–28–3	24–35–2
Turnovers		
Time of possession	34:06	25:54

Team	Category	Player	Statistics
Kansas	Passing	Jason Bean	19/28 449 yards 6 TDs 3 INTs
Kansas	Rushing	Devin Neal	20 carries 71 yards 1 TD
Kansas	Receiving	Luke Grimm	4 receptions 160 yards 3 TDs
UNLV	Passing	Jayden Maiava	24/35 291 yards 3 TDs 2 INTs
UNLV	Rushing	Jacob De Jesus	6 carries 40 yards 1 TD
UNLV	Receiving	Ricky White	7 receptions 97 yards 1 TD

After giving up a touchdown on their first drive on defense and then punting on their first drive on offense, the Jayhawks went on to score 28 unanswered points before UNLV kicked a field goal as time expired in the first half. UNLV started the 2nd half on a 14–0 run to pull within 4 points. The teams traded touchdowns at the beginning of the 4th quarter before the Jayhawks would put the game away with a 14–0 run. The Jayhawks won 49–36 despite 18 penalties for 216 yards, the majority of which were personal fouls and unsportsmanlike conduct. Senior quarterback Jason Bean tied a program record for passing touchdowns with 6. The win gave the Jayhawks their first bowl victory since they won the same bowl game, when it was known as the Insight Bowl, in 2008.

== Roster ==
2023 Kansas Jayhawks Football
Quarterback: 6 Jalon Daniels Junior; 9 Jason Bean RS-Senior; 14 Mikey Pauley RS–Freshman; 15 Cole Ballard Freshman; 16 Ben Easters RS-Sophomore; 18 Jack Jackson RS-Sophomore; 19 TJ Crews IV Freshman; Running back: 4 Devin Neal Junior; 12 Torry Locklin RS-Junior; 20 Daniel Hishaw Jr. RS-Sophomore; 25 Dylan McDuffie RS-Senior; 26 Johnny Thompson Jr. Freshman; 28 Sevion Morrison Junior; 30 Carson Morgan Freshman; 35 Billy Conaway RS-Junior; 38 Jack Schneider Freshman; Wide receiver: 0 Quentin Skinner Junior; 2 Lawrence Arnold Junior; 3 Tanaka Scott RS-Sophomore; 5 Doug Emilien RS-Sophomore; 7 Trevor Wilson RS-Junior; 11 Luke Grimm Junior; 13 Keaton Kubecka Freshman; 29 Reece Thomas RS-Sophomore; 36 Isaiah Coppage Freshman; 41 Hunter Luke Freshman; 80 Mack Moeller RS-Sophomore; 82 Isreal Moses Freshman; 84 Griffin Koch RS–Freshman; 85 Jarred Sample Freshman; 86 Surahz Buncom Freshman; Tight end: 17 Jaden Hamm Freshman; 45 Trevor Kardell Junior; 46 Dillon Mong Freshman; 47 Jared Casey Junior; 81 Quinton Conley RS-Freshman; 87 Will Huggins RS-Sophomore; 88 Tevita Ahoafi-Noa RS–Senior; 89 Mason Fairchild Senior	Offensive line: 50 Mike Novitsky RS-Senior; 52 Logan Brown RS-Junior; 54 Michael Ford Jr. Junior; 55 Ar'maj Reed-Adams RS-Sophomore; 57 Hank Kelly RS-Sophomore; 58 Kael Farkes RS-Freshman; 59 Nolan Gorczyca RS-Sophomore; 63 Jake Eisenhauer RS-Sophomore; 67 Dominick Puni RS-Senior; 70 Kobe Baynes RS-Sophomore; 71 James Livingston RS-Freshman; 72 Danny Robinson RS-Sophomore; 73 Dre Doiron RS-Sophomore; 74 De'Kedrick Sterns RS-Sophomore; 75 Calvin Clements Freshman; 76 Spencer Lovell RS-Junior; 77 Bryce Cabeldue Junior; Defensive end: 13 Dylan Brooks RS–Sophomore; 35 Tony Terry Freshman; 36 Patrick Joyner Jr. RS-Senior; 37 Hayden Hatcher RS-Senior; 45 Dean Miller RS-Sophomore; 46 Davion Westmoreland RS-Sophomore; 59 Jaydon Brittingham Freshman; 96 Cole Petrus RS-Sophomore; Defensive line: 7 Gage Keys RS-Sophomore; 9 Austin Booker RS-Sophomore; 40 Devin Phillips RS-Senior; 52 D.J. Withers RS-Sophomore; 53 Caleb Taylor Junior; 56 Marcus Calvin Freshman; 71 Grady Seyfert Freshman; 90 Jereme Robinson Junior; 92 Tommy Dunn Jr. RS-Sophomore; 94 Blake Herold Freshman; 97 Kenean Caldwell RS-Sophomore; 98 Lance Bassett Freshman; 99 Ronald McGee RS-Senior	Linebacker: 6 Taiwan Berryhill Jr. Junior; 10 Jayson Gilliom RS-Sophomore; 15 Craig Young RS-Senior; 16 Logan Brantley Freshman; 19 Tristian Fletcher RS-Sophomore; 20 Donovan Gaines RS-Sophomore; 26 Krishawn Brown RS-Sophomore; 28 J. B. Brown Junior; 30 Rich Miller Senior; 32 Dylan Downing RS-Junior; 34 Alex Raich Junior; 39 Cole Mondi RS-Sophomore; 41 Ezra Vedral Freshman; 44 Cornell Wheeler Linebacker; Cornerback: 2 Cobee Bryant Junior; 3 Mello Dotson Junior; 8 Kwinton Lassiter Senior; 18 Kalon Gervin RS-Senior; 22 Brian Dilworth RS-Freshman; 24 Damarius McGhee RS-Sophomore; 29 Jameel Croft Freshman; 47 Jacoby Davis Freshman; Safety: 1 Kenny Logan Jr. Senior; 4 Marvin Grant RS-Junior; 5 O.J. Burroughs Junior; 14 Jalen Dye RS-Sophomore; 17 Akili Hubbard Junior; 23 Mason Ellis RS-Freshman; 25 Kaleb Purdy RS-Freshman; 27 Taylor Davis Freshman; 31 Landon Nelson RS-Sophomore; 43 Andrew Russell RS-Senior; Special teams: 24 Reis Vernon P Junior; 34 Owen Piepergerdes K RS-Sophomore; 37 Grayden Addison P RS-Sophomore; 40 Tabor Allen K Junior; 51 Emory Duggar LS RS-Sophomore; 60 Luke Hosford LS RS-Junior; 91 Seth Keller K RS-Senior; 93 Charlie Weinrich K RS-Freshman; 99 Damon Greaves P Freshman; Roster updated: September 5, 2023

== Coaching staff ==
Name	Position
Lance Leipold	Head coach
Andy Kotelnicki	Offensive coordinator
Brian Borland	Defensive coordinator
Jake Schoonover	Special teams coordinator
Jim Zebrowski	Quarterbacks
Terrence Samuel	Wide receivers
Jonathan Wallace	Running backs
Jordan Peterson	Defensive backs
Taiwo Onatolu	Defensive ends
Scott Fuchs	Offensive line
Chris Simpson	Linebackers
Jim Panagos	Defensive tackles

== Regular season awards ==
=== All-Big 12 ===
==== First team ====
- OL Dominick Puni
- DL Austin Booker
- DB Cobee Bryant

==== Second team ====
- RB Devin Neal
- DB Kenny Logan

==== Honorable mention ====
- WR Lawrence Arnold
- QB Jason Bean
- DB Mello Dotson
- TE Mason Fairchild
- OL Mike Novitsky
- DL Jereme Robinson

=== Conference awards ===
Austin Booker

- Defensive Newcomer of the Year
