= 2022 Liberty Bowl =

Postseason college football bowl game

2022 AutoZone Liberty Bowl
- 64th Liberty Bowl
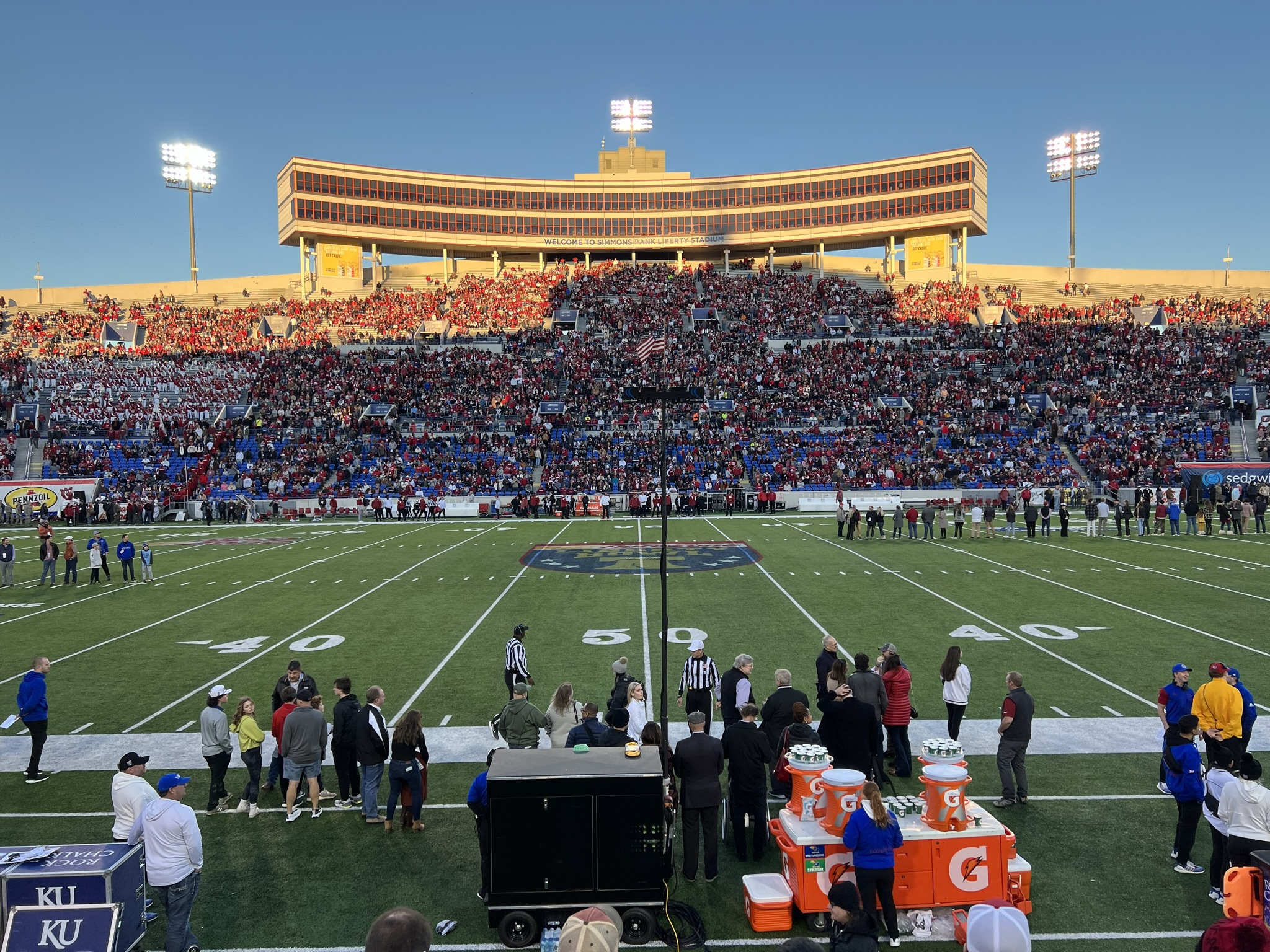
- The stands and press boxes prior to kickoff
Kansas Jayhawks	Arkansas Razorbacks
(6–6)	(6–6)
Big 12	SEC
53	55
Head coach: Lance Leipold	Head coach: Sam Pittman
	1	2	3	4	OT	2OT	3OT	Total
Kansas	7	6	7	18	7	8	0	53
Arkansas	24	7	7	0	7	8	2	55
- Date: December 28, 2022
- Season: 2022
- Stadium: Simmons Bank Liberty Stadium
- Location: Memphis, Tennessee
- MVP: KJ Jefferson (QB, Arkansas)
- Favorite: Arkansas by 2.5
- Referee: Matthew Richards (Pac-12)
- Attendance: 52,847
- Payout: US$4,700,000

United States TV coverage
- Network: ESPN
- Announcers: Dave O'Brien (play-by-play), Dan Mullen (analyst), and Taylor McGregor (sideline)

The 2022 Liberty Bowl (officially known as the AutoZone Liberty Bowl for sponsorship reasons) was a college football bowl game played on December 28, 2022, at Simmons Bank Liberty Stadium in Memphis, Tennessee, United States. The 64th annual Liberty Bowl, game featured the Kansas Jayhawks from the Big 12 Conference and the Arkansas Razorbacks from the Southeastern Conference (SEC). The game began at 4:35 p.m. CST and was aired on ESPN. It was one of the 2022–23 bowl games concluding the 2022 FBS football season.

Both teams entered having started the season well but finished poorly: Kansas won their first five games and were ranked in the AP Poll for the first time since 2009, but finished 6–6 after losing their last three games and six of their final seven. Arkansas received a preseason ranking of No. 19 and started the year 3–0 before losing three straight and finishing the year 1–3 in their final four games. Kansas made their first bowl appearance since the 2008 Insight Bowl while Arkansas made their second straight after playing in the 2022 Outback Bowl. Previews praised both quarterbacks, as Jalon Daniels returned from injury to a productive end to the season and KJ Jefferson ranked highly in the SEC in passing yardage. The Razorbacks saw some personnel changes leading up to the game: defensive coordinator Barry Odom became the head coach at UNLV and both sides of the ball saw departures and opt-outs, including Drew Sanders, Bumper Pool, and Jadon Haselwood.

After the teams traded touchdowns to begin the game, Arkansas scored four unanswered touchdowns, two passing and two rushing, to give themselves a 31–7 lead with five minutes remaining in the second quarter. Kansas scored a second touchdown of their own a minute before halftime, cutting the Razorbacks' advantage to eighteen points. After Rashod Dubinion opened the scoring in the third quarter for Arkansas the momentum shifted and Kansas scored 25 unanswered points, finishing with a Luke Grimm reception and a subsequent two-point conversion that tied the score at 38 points apiece with 41 seconds remaining. The game went to overtime where each team scored a touchdown and made their extra point; in double overtime, each team scored again and successfully converted their two-point try. Under NCAA overtime rules, starting in the third overtime period, teams only alternate two-point attempts rather than entire drives starting from the opponents' 25-yard line. Arkansas scored theirs but Kansas was unable to do the same after Jason Bean's pass fell incomplete, giving the Razorbacks a 55–53 triple overtime victory.

== Teams ==
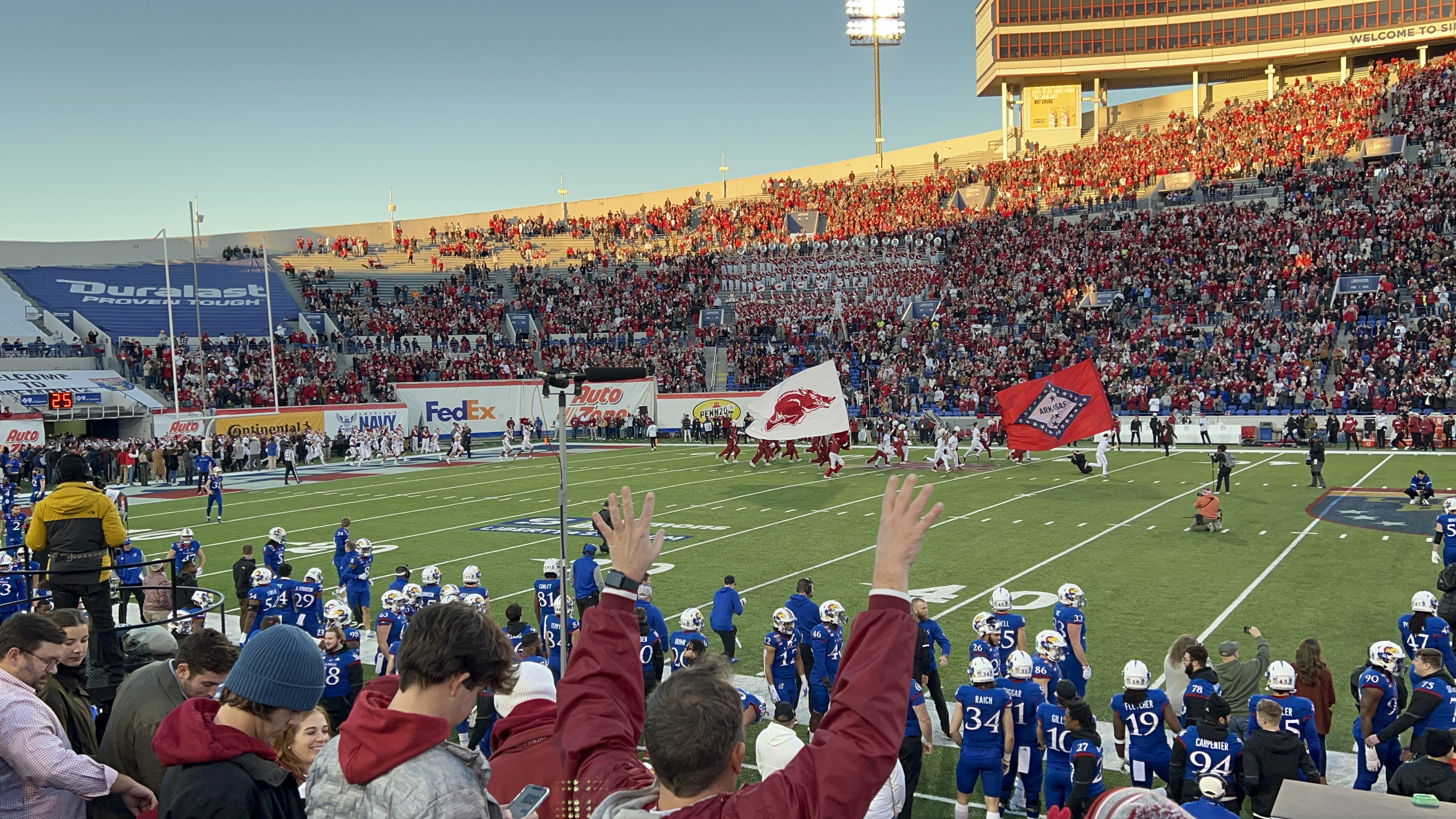
Arkansas enters the field as Kansas stands on their sideline

The Liberty Bowl featured the Kansas Jayhawks from the Big 12 Conference and the Arkansas Razorbacks from the Southeastern Conference. The Jayhawks and Razorbacks had previously only met twice, in 1905 and 1906, with the Jayhawks winning both games. Both teams became bowl eligible by beating a ranked team: Kansas beat No. 18 Oklahoma State and Arkansas beat No. 14 Ole Miss.

Previews of the game viewed the teams similarly, with both offenses generally praised and expected to do well against each other's defenses. CBS Sports said that quarterback play would be a high point for each team, with Jalon Daniels and KJ Jefferson each performing well over the course of the season. Further, they gave Kansas the advantage in momentum despite the disappointing end to both teams' seasons, since the Jayhawks' appearance ended their bowl drought of 14 years. Overall, Arkansas was favored to win the game by 2.5 points.

=== Kansas ===
The Jayhawks entered the game with a 6–6 record and a 3–5 mark in Big 12 Conference games. They started the season with a 5–0 record and were ranked for the first time since 2009, but fell out of the rankings after losing back-to-back games. The Jayhawks made their first bowl game appearance since the 2008 Insight Bowl and their second all-time appearance in the Liberty Bowl, with the first in 1973.

Sports Illustrated praised Kansas quarterback Jalon Daniels for his performance early in the season, but he suffered an injury during the Jayhawks' game against TCU and missed four weeks before returning to action. Athlon Sports, in their preview of the game, said that he had been one of the best quarterbacks in the country prior to his injury, and he finished the regular season having totaled nearly 1,500 passing yards and 400 rushing yards in addition to 19 total touchdowns. College Football News said that Kansas's defense was a potential weak point for the team, though the contrast between the Kansas offense and the opposing Arkansas defense was viewed favorably for Kansas; Athlon Sports further wrote that Daniels' ability to run and pass would be an advantage over an Arkansas defense that entered the game ranked 13th of 14 in their conference in pass efficiency defense, 13th in yards per play allowed and 11th in overall scoring defense. The Jayhawks had relatively little concern regarding opt-outs, especially as compared to Arkansas.

=== Arkansas ===
Arkansas began the season ranked No. 19 and won their first three contests but lost their next three and finished the season losing three of their last four games; they entered the game with a record of 6–6 and 3–5 in SEC contests. This was Arkansas' 44th bowl appearance all-time and their second in a row after playing in the 2022 Outback Bowl. This was the Razorbacks' sixth appearance in the Liberty Bowl, with their last coming in the January 2016 edition against Kansas State.

Quarterback KJ Jefferson announced on December 3 that he would forgo the NFL draft in favor of a final year at Arkansas. Running back Raheim Sanders finished in second place in the SEC for total rushing yards during the season. College Football News said that the Razorback defense could have a "slew of problems" with Kansas's offense as they gave up a large number of yards to many opponents in the regular season. The Razorbacks were missing several players for the game due to either the NCAA transfer portal, injury, or NFL draft preparation; on offense, wide receiver Ketron Jackson and tight end Trey Knox transferred after the end of the regular season and wide receiver Jadon Haselwood decided to opt out of the game for the draft. On defense, linebackers Bumper Pool and Drew Sanders did not play due to injury and draft preparation, respectively, while tackle Isaiah Nichols opted to transfer. In total, only 51 scholarship players dressed for the game for Arkansas. Additionally, Arkansas was without former defensive coordinator Barry Odom, who accepted the head coaching position at UNLV on December 6.

== Game summary ==
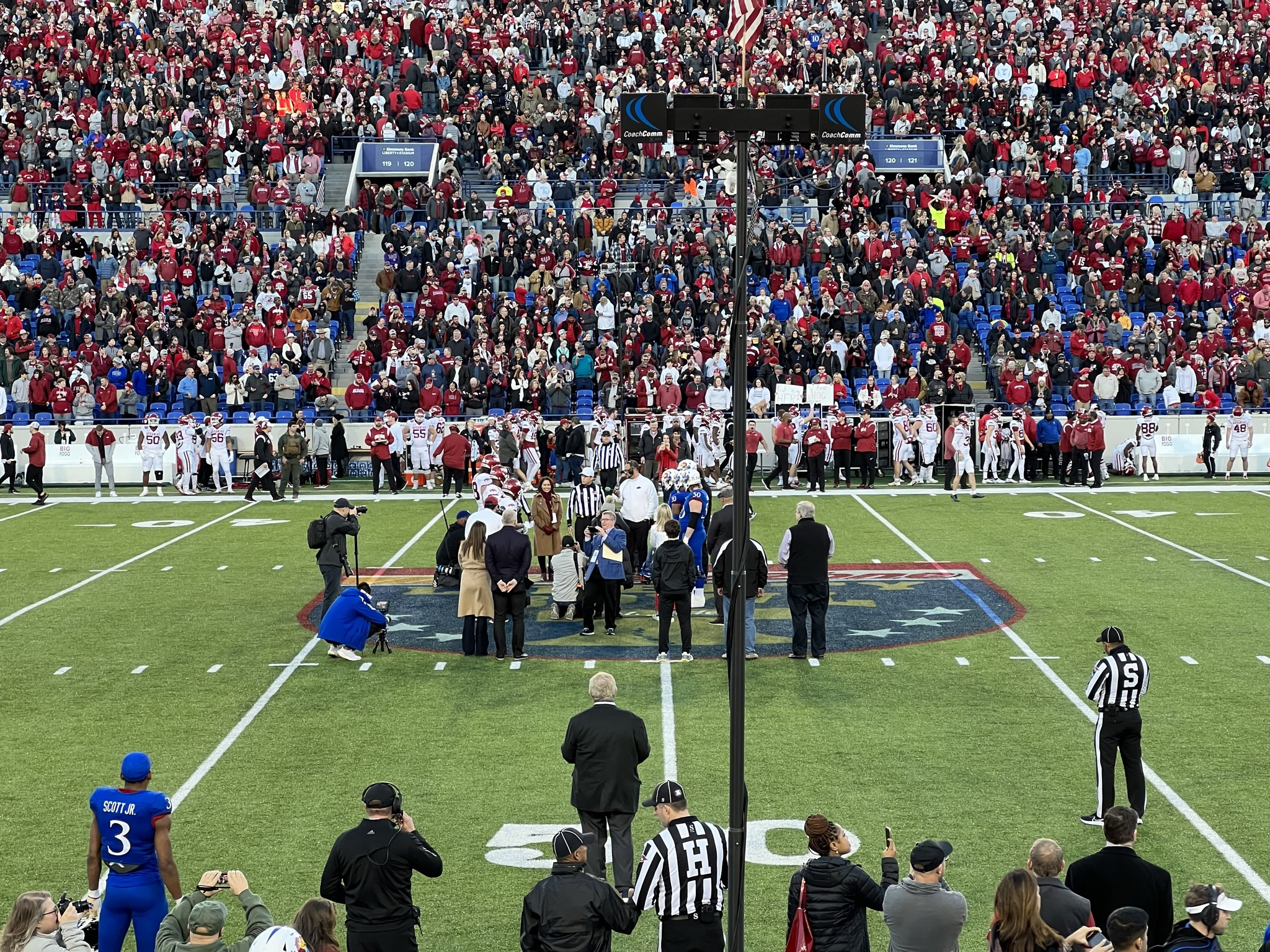
The team captains and referees perform the coin toss before the game

The Liberty Bowl was televised by ESPN, with a commentary team of Dave O'Brien, Dan Mullen, and Taylor McGregor. The ESPN Radio broadcast was commentated by Clay Matvick, Rocky Boiman, and Tera Talmadge. The game's officiating crew, representing the Pac-12 Conference, was led by referee Matthew Richards and umpire Michael Stephens. The game was played at Simmons Bank Liberty Stadium in Memphis, Tennessee, where the weather at kickoff was sunny and 61 °F (16 °C).

=== First half ===
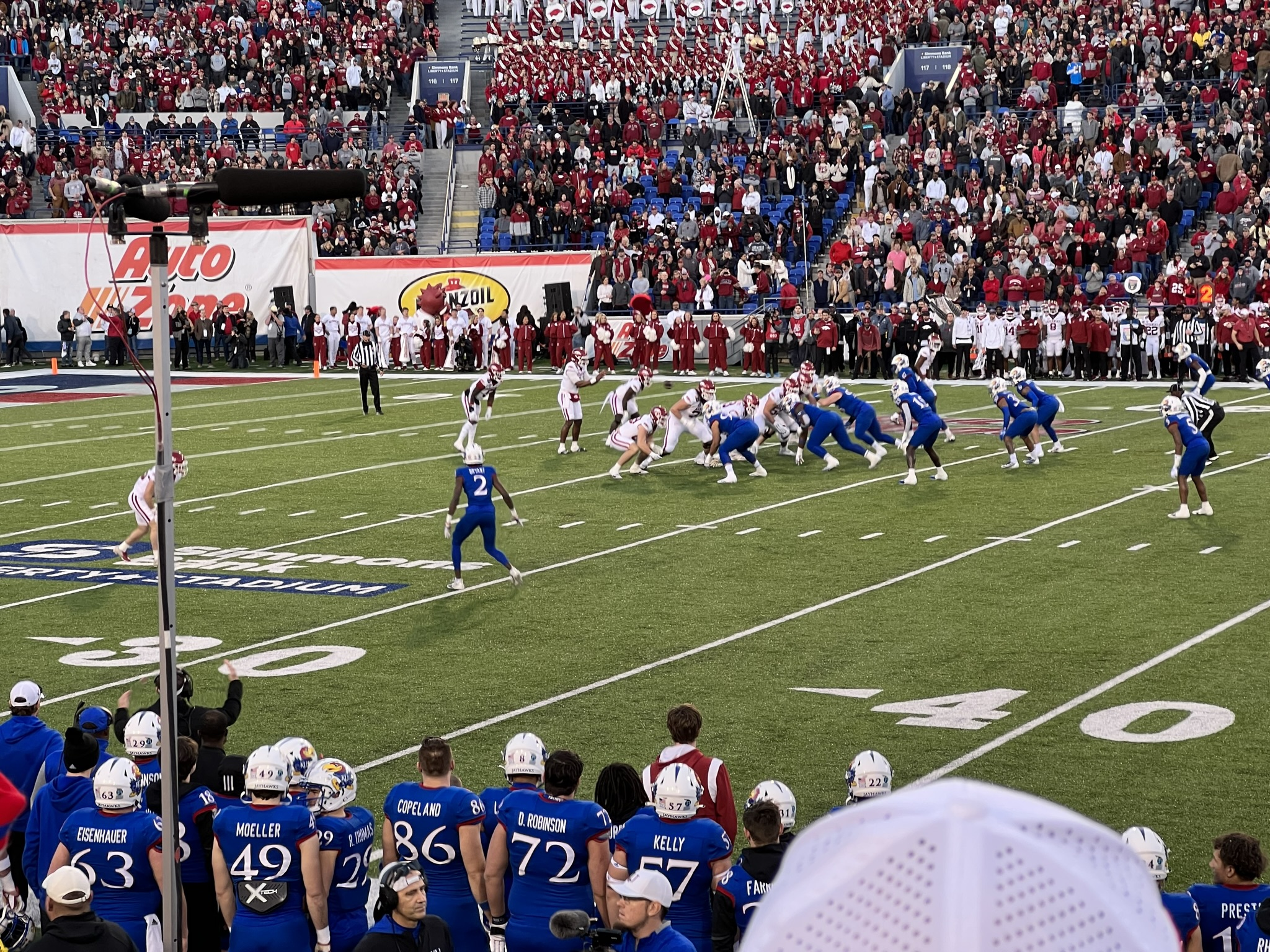
Arkansas on offense during the first quarter

Arkansas got the ball to begin the game as Tabor Allen's opening kickoff was fair caught for a touchback. Arkansas faced 3rd & 5 early but converted it with a 10-yard pass from KJ Jefferson to Harper Cole, which was followed shortly by rushes of 15 yards from Jefferson and 12 yards by Raheim Sanders. After a pair of short gains, placekicker Cam Little made a 37-yard field goal to open the scoring and take a 3–0 lead. Kansas opened their first drive with a pair of gains, first for 7 yards on a Devin Neal rush and then for 24 yards on a pass from Jalon Daniels to Luke Grimm. After a 10-yard Daniels rush two plays later, Daniels passed to Ky Thomas for a 29-yard touchdown, giving the Jayhawks the lead. On their second drives, both teams traded three-and-outs; Arkansas gained seven yards on a Jefferson rush but were unable to pick up the remaining three yards and punted to the Kansas 37-yard line, but a fumble on Kansas' first play set them back four yards and they punted after two incomplete passes. Arkansas took possession at their own 32-yard line and began with a 9-yard rush by AJ Green, after which Jefferson found Matt Landers for a 59-yard touchdown pass that gave Arkansas the lead. Cam Little's extra point gave the Razorbacks a three-point lead. The ensuing kickoff was muffed by Sevion Morrison and recovered by Cole for Arkansas at the Kansas 17-yard line. The Razorbacks scored in one play as Jefferson passed to Ty Washington for a touchdown, making the score 17–7 Arkansas. Jake Bates' kickoff went out for a touchback and Daniels completed a pass for 35 yards to Lawrence Arnold to quickly advance into Arkansas territory. After a 12-yard pass to Torry Locklin, Daniels' pass was intercepted by Quincey McAdoo, who returned it 17 yards to the Arkansas 27-yard line. Rashod Dubinion lost 4 yards on a rush on the first play of Arkansas' ensuing drive, but Jefferson passed to Jaedon Wilson for a 30-yard gain two plays later to reach Kansas territory. Jefferson gained another first down on the ground two plays later with an 8-yard gain, and he rushed for 15 yards several plays later to reach the Kansas 7-yard line. The Razorbacks concluded the drive with 23 seconds left as Jefferson rushed for a 3-yard touchdown, stretching the lead to seventeen points. Kansas got one play off before the end of the quarter, as Daniels passed to Neal for a 15-yard gain before time expired.

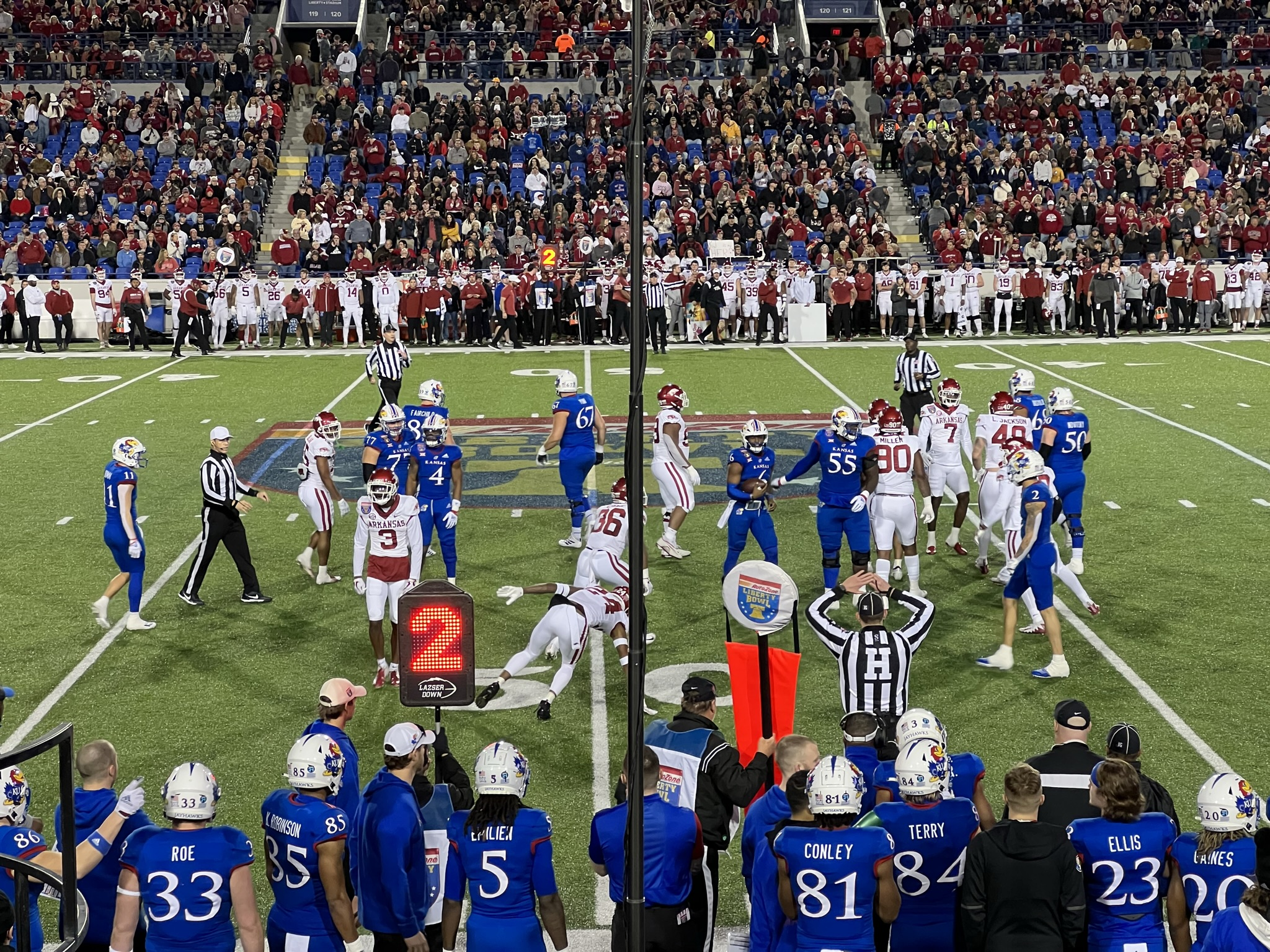
Kansas quarterback Jalon Daniels (blue, No. 6) after gaining a first down during the second quarter

Kansas began the second quarter with a pass completed from Daniels to Arnold that reached the Kansas 49-yard line, and Daniels rushed for a first down on the next play. After moderate gains on the next few plays, Daniels was intercepted by Dwight McGlothern at the Arkansas 35-yard line, though he was penalized for unsportsmanlike conduct back to the Arkansas 15-yard line. The Razorbacks started their next drive with a 12-yard pass from Jefferson to Green but they stalled from there and punted after gaining five yards on their next three plays. The punt was downed at the Kansas 45-yard line, though the Jayhawks were similarly unproductive as Daniels rushed for a loss of 5 yards on first down and was sacked by Jordan Domineck and Terry Hampton, losing 3 yards, on third down. Grayden Addison punted for the Jayhawks on fourth down, and the kick was fair caught on the Arkansas 22-yard line. Dubinion rushed for 2 yards before Jefferson passed for 17 yards to Bryce Stephens, earning a first down; Dubinion gained 26 yards on a rush several plays later to reach Kansas territory at the 35-yard line. After a timeout, Jefferson passed to Green for 10 yards and Green scored on a 20-yard rush on the next play; Little's extra point made the Arkansas lead 24 points. The ensuing kickoff by Bates went out for a touchback and Daniels completed an 11-yard pass to Arnold to convert a third down after a pair of short rushes by Neal. Grimm was the recipient of a 17-yard pass from Daniels later in the drive, and the Jayhawks found the end zone four plays later with a 24-yard pass to Mason Fairchild. Kansas opted to try a two-point conversion, which was unsuccessful. Arkansas started their next drive with 78 seconds left in the half at their own 25-yard line; Dubinion rushed for 13 yards on the first play of the drive and for 12 yards two plays later. On the next play, Jefferson rushed for 32 yards and advanced the ball to the Kansas 9-yard line with a personal foul after the play, though his pass into the end zone was intercepted by O.J. Burroughs for a touchback. Kansas took a knee to end the half on their next play.

=== Second half ===
Kansas got the ball to begin the second half as Bates' kickoff went out for a touchback. Daniels' pass to Grimm lost 7 yards on their second play but they made up for it with a 27-yard pass to Arnold to earn a first down. They gained 6 yards on a Neal rush but were unable to pick up any additional yardage and pooch punted on 4th & 4, which went out for a touchback. Three rushes for 11 yards earned the Razorbacks a first down before a pair of rushes, the first by Dubinion for 17 yards and the second to Bryce Stephens for 21. Jefferson passed to Jaedon Wilson for a 17-yard gain to enter the red zone and Dubinion reached the Kansas 7-yard line with a rush on the next play. He carried for 5 yards and then for 2 yards to score a touchdown, giving Arkansas a 25-point lead just under halfway through the third quarter. Kansas was unable to respond as they went three-and-out, gaining only one yard on three plays, and their punt was returned to the Arkansas 48-yard line. Arkansas was not able to do any better, as they were set back fifteen yards by an unsportsmanlike conduct penalty and were unable to earn back the yardage required and punted back to the Jayhawks at the Kansas 14-yard line. A 9-yard pass and a 6-yard rush began Kansas' next drive before Daniels passed to Grimm for a gain of 45 yards. He followed with a 20-yard pass to Fairchild before a pass interference call gave Kansas the ball on the Arkansas 2-yard line. Ky Thomas rushed for a touchdown on the next play, and Owen Piepergerdes kicked the extra point. Arkansas started with two Dubinion rushes on their next series which went for no gain and one yard, respectively, but an incomplete pass on third down forced the Razorbacks to punt again; this kick was downed on the Kansas 37-yard line. Daniels started quickly with a 28-yard pass to Locklin and another 10-yard completion to Locklin converted a third down several plays later. Kansas were not able to run another play before the clock expired for the end of the third quarter.

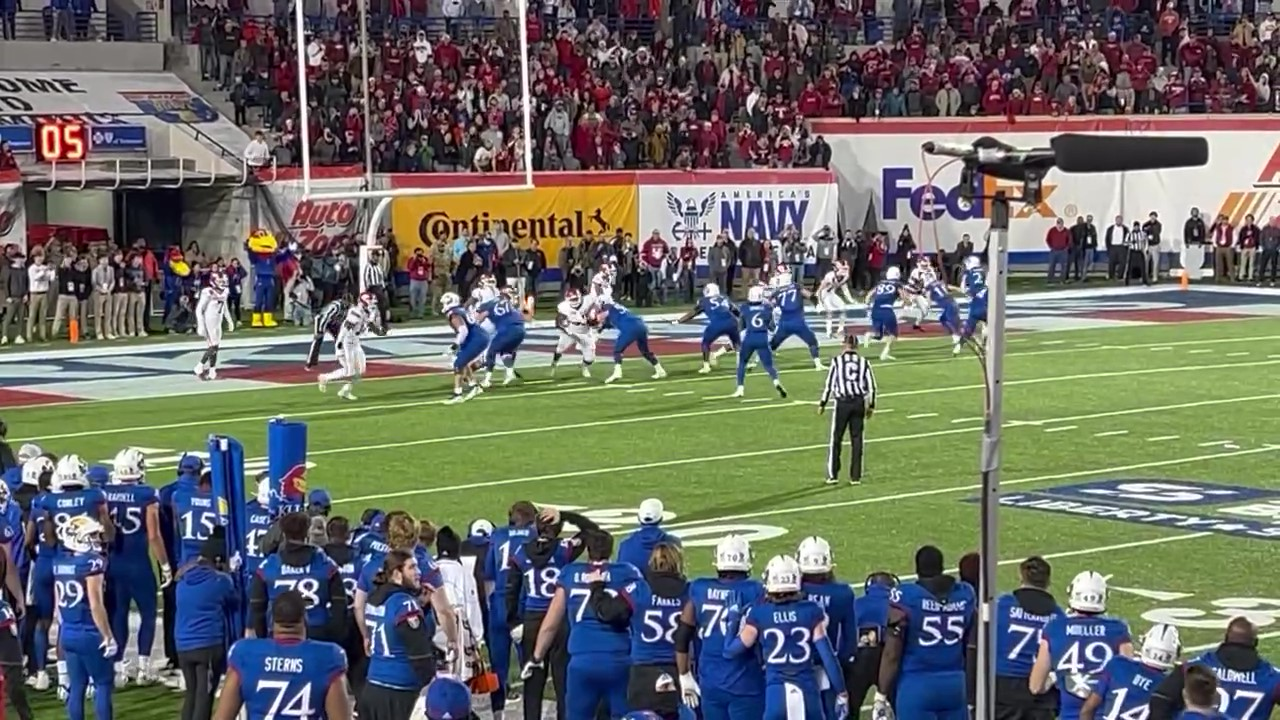
Kansas successfully attempts a two-point conversion that tied the game during the fourth quarter

The Jayhawks offense began the fourth quarter with an incomplete pass from Daniels intended for Tanaka Scott, and they settled for a field goal which brought their deficit down to 15 points. Arkansas gained 11 yards on a Jefferson rush on their first play and 8 yards on two Green rushes but an offensive pass interference penalty on 3rd & 2 brought the ball back to the Arkansas 29-yard line for 3rd & 17. Jefferson passed to Hudson Henry for a gain of 11 yards but Max Fletcher was forced to come on to punt, and the kick was downed at the Kansas 16-yard line. The teams then traded three-and-outs: Kansas lost 4 yards on the first play of their next series and were unable to gain any yardage, prompting them to punt and down the kick at the Arkansas 35-yard line. Arkansas rushed for 8 yards in their first two plays but gained no yards on 3rd & 2 and punted back to Kansas; the kick was fair caught at the Kansas 22-yard line by Burroughs. Kansas started with a 20-yard pass from Daniels to Scott, and Daniels gained a first down with an 8-yard rush several plays later. The Jayhawks converted third down on their next series with a 6-yard pass from Daniels to Thomas, but were pushed back with a sack on the next play for a loss of four yards. A 14-yard pass to Arnold gained a first down but three incompletions on their next four plays resulted in a turnover on downs at the Arkansas 21-yard line. Green carried on the first two plays of the Razorbacks' ensuing drive, gaining 7 yards in total, before Jefferson converted third down with a 43-yard pass to Landers. Landers gained 15 yards on a rush but fumbled and the ball was recovered by Cobee Bryant and returned to the Arkansas 48-yard line. Daniels passed to Fairchild for 15 yards to reach the Arkansas 33-yard line on Kansas's first play, and several more rushes gave Kansas another first down. After a sack by Jordan Domineck, Daniels found Kevin Terry for 30 yards and then passed to Douglass Emilien for a 10-yard touchdown, pulling Kansas within eight points. The ensuing onside kick was recovered by Kansas at midfield and the Jayhawks struck quickly with a 34-yard pass to Grimm on their first play. Two incomplete passes followed before Kansas was called for a delay of game penalty that pushed them back to 3rd & 15 from the Arkansas 21-yard line, but Daniels passed to Grimm for a touchdown on the next play, bringing them to within two points, and a successful pass on the two-point conversion tied the game with 41 seconds remaining. Dubinion rushed for 11 yards on Arkansas' second play and Green gained 9 yards and a first down several plays later, giving the Razorbacks two seconds remaining to run a play; Green got the carry and gained 35 yards but the clock ran out and the game went to overtime.

=== Overtimes ===
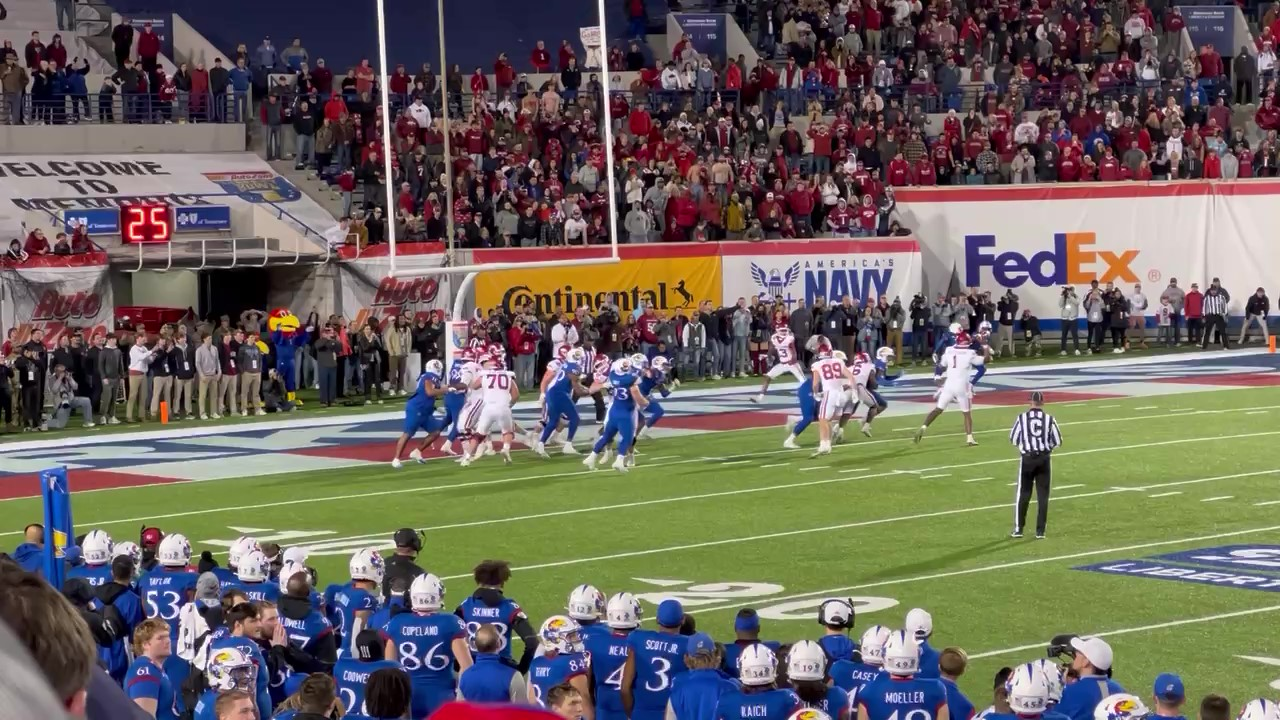
Arkansas scores a two-point conversion in double overtime

Arkansas won the coin toss and chose to play defense first, so Kansas started the first overtime period on offense. Daniels started quickly as he passed to Grimm for a 17-yard gain on the first play of overtime, and three straight rushes by Thomas advanced the Jayhawks to the Arkansas 2-yard line. On 4th & Goal, Daniels completed a pass to Jared Casey in the end zone for a touchdown, and Piepergerdes added the extra point to put Kansas ahead by seven. On their corresponding overtime possession, Jefferson began with a 19-yard pass to Landers and handed the ball off to Dubinion on the next play, who was able to find the end zone for a touchdown. Little tied the game with an extra point of his own, sending the game to double overtime.

Arkansas had the first possession of double overtime, and their first play was a 5-yard pass from Jefferson to Green. On second down, Jefferson kept it on the ground and ran for a 20-yard touchdown; he followed that up with a completed pass to Wilson for a two-point conversion. Daniels started Kansas's possession with a 3-yard rush and the Jayhawks were called for holding on the next play, bringing them back to the Arkansas 32-yard line for 2nd & 17. Daniels responded well with an 11-yard pass to Fairchild and a 19-yard pass to Arnold to set up a 2-yard rush of his own for a touchdown. On the two point-conversion, Daniels rushed and was stopped short but a targeting penalty called on McAdoo gave Kansas another try. Daniels then passed to Casey, tying the game again and sending it to a third overtime.

In the third overtime and beyond, teams have one play each, a two-point conversion from the 3-yard line, rather than full possessions from the opponents' 25-yard line; Arkansas scored theirs, with a Jefferson pass to Dubinion, to take the lead again and force Kansas to convert theirs in order to stay in the game. They failed, on an incomplete pass by backup quarterback Jason Bean, and the game ended after three overtimes with Arkansas defeating Kansas, 55–53. The total duration of the game was four hours and sixteen minutes.

=== Scoring summary ===
2022 AutoZone Liberty Bowl

Quarter	1	2	3	4	OT	2OT	3OT	Total
Kansas	7	6	7	18	7	8	0	53
Arkansas	24	7	7	0	7	8	2	55

at Simmons Bank Liberty Stadium • Memphis, Tennessee

- Date: Wednesday, December 28, 2022
- Game time: 4:30 p.m. CST
- Game weather: Sunny • Temperature: 61 °F (16 °C) • Wind: South 13 mph (21 km/h)
- Game attendance: 52,847
- Referee: Matthew Richards
- TV announcers (ESPN): Dave O'Brien (play-by-play), Dan Mullen (analyst), and Taylor McGregor (sideline)
- Box score

Scoring summary

Quarter	Time	Drive			Team	Scoring information	Score	
Quarter	Time	Plays	Yards	TOP	Team	Scoring information	Kansas	Arkansas
1	11:12	10	56	3:48	Arkansas	37-yard field goal by Cam Little	0	3
1	8:40	6	75	2:32	Kansas	Ky Thomas 29-yard touchdown reception from Jalon Daniels, Owen Piepergerdes kick good	7	3
1	6:05	2	68	0:30	Arkansas	Matt Landers 59-yard touchdown reception from KJ Jefferson, Cam Little kick good	7	10
1	5:57	1	17	0:05	Arkansas	Ty Washington 17-yard touchdown reception from KJ Jefferson, Cam Little kick good	7	17
1	0:23	11	73	4:11	Arkansas	KJ Jefferson 3-yard touchdown run, Cam Little kick good	7	24
2	5:02	8	78	3:13	Arkansas	AJ Green 20-yard touchdown run, Cam Little kick good	7	31
2	1:18	10	75	3:44	Kansas	Mason Fairchild 29-yard touchdown reception from Jalon Daniels, 2-point pass failed	13	31
3	8:43	10	80	3:16	Arkansas	Rashod Dubinion 2-yard touchdown run, Cam Little kick good	13	38
3	3:15	5	86	2:26	Kansas	Ky Thomas 2-yard touchdown run, Owen Piepergerdes kick good	20	38
4	14:07	8	44	2:47	Kansas	36-yard field goal by Owen Piepergerdes	23	38
4	1:05	7	48	1:38	Kansas	Douglas Emilien 10-yard touchdown reception from Jalon Daniels, Owen Piepergerdes kick good	30	38
4	0:41	4	50	0:24	Kansas	Luke Grimm 21-yard touchdown reception from Jalon Daniels, 2-point pass good	38	38
OT					Kansas	Jared Casey 2-yard touchdown reception from Jalon Daniels, Owen Piepergerdes kick good	45	38
OT					Arkansas	Rashod Dubinion 8-yard touchdown run, Cam Little kick good	45	45
2OT					Arkansas	KJ Jefferson 20-yard touchdown run, 2-point pass good	45	53
2OT					Kansas	Jalon Daniels 2-yard touchdown run, 2-point pass good	53	53
3OT					Arkansas	2-point pass good (KJ Jefferson pass to Rashod Dubinion)	53	55
"TOP" = time of possession. For other American football terms, see Glossary of American football.							53	55

== Statistics ==
Team statistical comparison
Statistic	Kansas	Arkansas
First downs	32	29
First downs rushing	5	18
First downs passing	25	10
First downs penalty	2	1
Third down efficiency	9–17	8–15
Fourth down efficiency	1–2	0–0
Total plays–net yards	90–603	81–681
Rushing attempts–net yards	34–59	52–394
Yards per rush	1.7	7.6
Yards passing	544	287
Pass completions–attempts	37–56	19–29
Interceptions thrown	2	1
Punt returns–total yards	0–0	1–3
Kickoff returns–total yards	1–7	2–38
Punts–average yardage	5–41.2	6–37.0
Fumbles–lost	3–1	1–1
Penalties–yards	4–34	7–60
Time of possession	30:52	29:08

Kansas statistics
Jayhawks passing
	C–A	Yds	TD–INT
Jalon Daniels	37–55	544	5–2
Jason Bean	0–1	0	0–0
Jayhawks rushing
	Car	Yds	TD
Devin Neal	9	29	0
Jalon Daniels	14	21	1
Ky Thomas	10	11	1
TEAM	1	−2	0
Jayhawks receiving
	Rec	Yds	TD
Luke Grimm	10	167	1
Lawrence Arnold	8	119	0
Mason Fairchild	6	80	1
Torry Locklin	3	50	0
Ky Thomas	2	35	1
Kevin Terry	1	30	0
Devin Neal	2	23	0
Tanaka Scott	1	20	0
Douglas Emilien	1	10	1
Jared Casey	2	6	1
Quentin Skinner	1	4	0

Arkansas statistics
Razorbacks passing
	C–A	Yds	TD–INT
KJ Jefferson	19–29	287	2–1
Razorbacks rushing
	Car	Yds	TD
KJ Jefferson	14	130	2
Rashod Dubinion	20	112	2
AJ Green	13	99	1
Bryce Stephens	1	21	0
Raheim Sanders	3	17	0
Matt Landers	1	15	0
Razorbacks receiving
	Rec	Yds	TD
Matt Landers	3	121	1
Jaedon Wilson	2	47	0
AJ Green	4	30	0
Rashod Dubinion	3	19	0
Ty Washington	1	17	1
Bryce Stephens	1	17	0
Hudson Henry	2	13	0
Nathan Bax	1	11	0
Harper Cole	1	10	0
Isaiah Sategna	1	2	0

== Aftermath ==
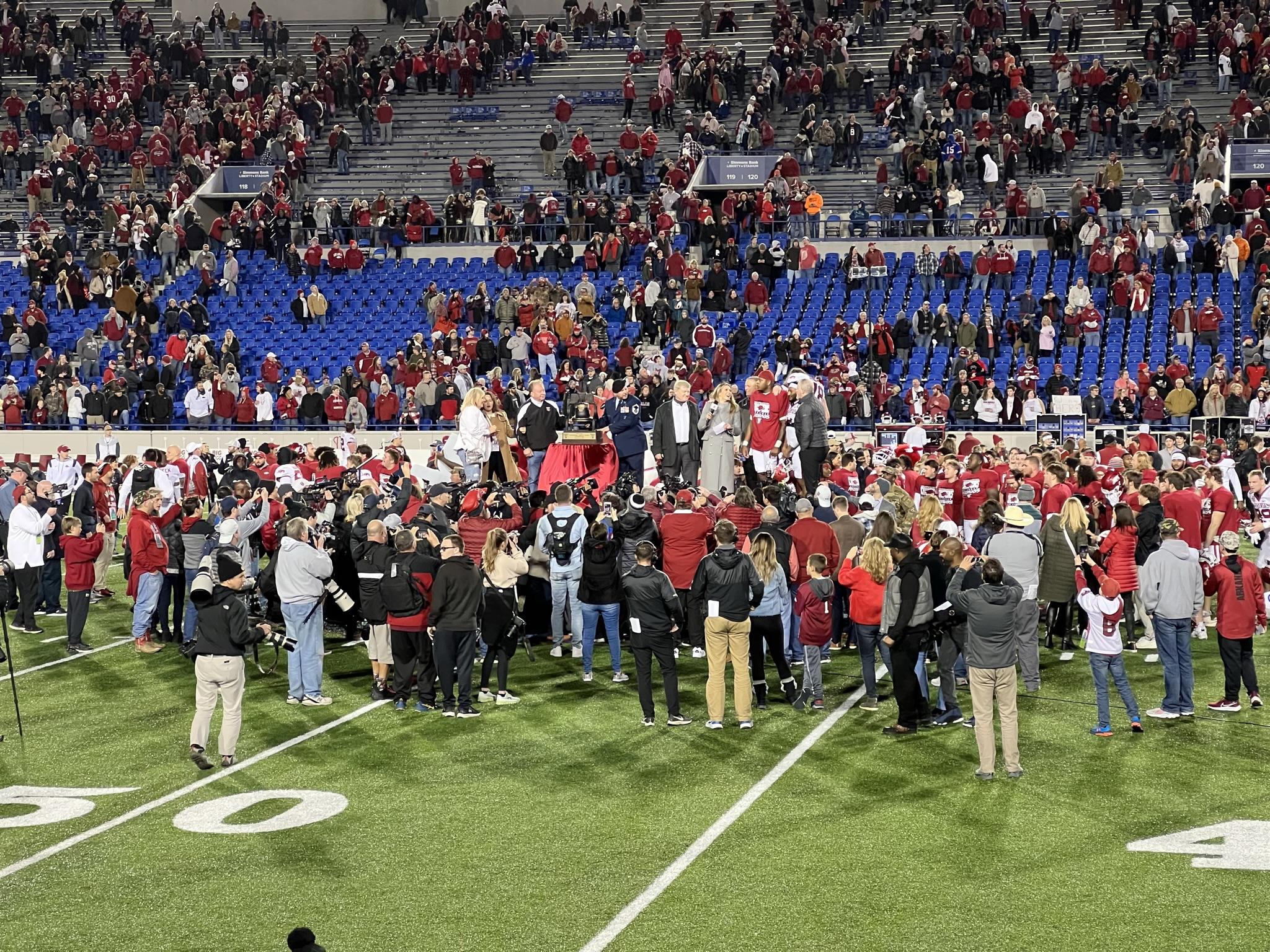
Liberty Bowl officials present the trophy to Arkansas

As a result of the game, Arkansas finished with a winning season and a final record of 7–6, while Kansas finished a losing season with a final record of 6–7. Kansas quarterback Jalon Daniels set a Liberty Bowl record and a Kansas program record with 544 passing yards, and his 37 completions, five touchdown passes, and six total touchdowns (including his one rushing touchdown) all set Liberty Bowl records as well. Kansas drew the game even from an 18-point deficit entering the fourth quarter, and they would have become the second team to overcome a deficit of 18 points or more during the 2022 season, after Houston did so against Memphis on October 8, had they won the game.

Arkansas quarterback KJ Jefferson was named the game's most valuable player, having completed 19 of 29 pass attempts (65.5%) for 287 yards with two touchdowns and one interception, plus 130 yards and 2 touchdowns on 14 carries.

On December 29, the day following the game, the targeting call on Arkansas cornerback Quincey McAdoo in double overtime was overturned following a review of the play by the NCAA Football Rules Committee and coordinator of officials Steve Shaw. The conclusion of the review was that the play by McAdoo was not targeting and that he should not have been disqualified for the remainder of the game; additionally, he did not have to sit out the first half of Arkansas' 2023 opener against Western Carolina.
