= 2023 Guaranteed Rate Bowl =

Postseason college football bowl game

- 34th Guaranteed Rate Bowl
Kansas Jayhawks	UNLV Rebels
(8–4)	(9–4)
Big 12	Mountain West
49	36
Head coach: Lance Leipold	Head coach: Barry Odom
	1	2	3	4	Total
Kansas	7	21	0	21	49
UNLV	7	3	14	12	36
- Date: December 26, 2023
- Season: 2023
- Stadium: Chase Field
- Location: Phoenix, Arizona
- MVP: Jason Bean (QB, Kansas) & Kenny Logan (S, Kansas)
- Favorite: Kansas by 10.5
- Referee: Tim Hedgepeth (ACC)
- Attendance: 26,478

United States TV coverage
- Network: ESPN; ESPN Radio
- Announcers: Beth Mowins (play-by-play), Kirk Morrison (analyst), and Stormy Buonantony (sideline) (ESPN); Jorge Sedano (play-by-play) and Max Starks (analyst) (ESPN Radio)

The 2023 Guaranteed Rate Bowl was a college football bowl game played on December 26, 2023, at Chase Field in Phoenix, Arizona. The 34th annual Guaranteed Rate Bowl featured Kansas of the Big 12 Conference and UNLV of the Mountain West Conference. The game began at approximately 7:10 p.m. MST and was aired on ESPN. The Guaranteed Rate Bowl was one of the 2023–24 bowl games concluding the 2023 FBS football season. The game's title sponsor was residential mortgage company Guaranteed Rate.

Kansas won the game 49–36. Kansas quarterback Jason Bean, who won offensive MVP, set the Guaranteed Rate Bowl record for passing touchdowns with 6, split between receivers Luke Grimm and Lawrence Arnold who both had 3, tying former Jayhawk Dezmon Briscoe's record for receiving touchdowns.

== Teams ==
The game featured the Kansas Jayhawks of the Big 12 Conference and the UNLV Rebels of the Mountain West Conference.

The game was the third meeting between Kansas and UNLV with the all-time series tied at 1–1 prior to the game. The teams' had previously met in 2003 with the Jayhawks winning 46–24.

=== Kansas Jayhawks ===
The Jayhawks entered the game with an 8–4 record (5–4 in Big 12), tied for seventh place in their conference.

This was Kansas' second Guaranteed Rate Bowl; they previously won the 2008 Insight Bowl when the bowl was known by that name. It was the Jayhawks' second consecutive season playing in a bowl game, something only accomplished once before in program history (2007–2008).

=== UNLV Rebels ===
The Rebels entered the game with a 9–4 record (6–2 in Mountain West). Winning the three-way tiebreaker for first place in their conference, the Rebels hosted the 2023 Mountain West Championship Game, losing to Boise State, 44–20.

This was UNLV's first Guaranteed Rate Bowl. It was also the Rebel's first bowl appearance since the 2014 Heart of Dallas Bowl, following the 2013 season.

== Game summary ==
2023 Guaranteed Rate Bowl

Quarter	1	2	3	4	Total
Kansas	7	21	0	21	49
UNLV	7	3	14	12	36

at Chase Field • Phoenix, Arizona

- Date: Tuesday, December 26, 2023
- Game time: 7:00 p.m. MST
- Game weather: None (retractable roof closed)
- Game attendance: 26,478
- Referee: Tim Hedgepeth
- TV announcers (ESPN): Beth Mowins (play-by-play), Kirk Morrison (analyst), and Stormy Buonantony (sideline)
- Box score

Game information

First Quarter

- (11:07) UNLV – Vincent Davis Jr. 3 yard run, Jose Pizano kick (Drive: 8 plays, 65 yards, 3:53; UNLV 7–0)
- (2:05) KU – Luke Grimm 6 yard pass from Jason Bean, Seth Keller kick (Drive: 9 plays, 98 yards, 4:48; Tied 7–7)

Second Quarter

- (11:37) KU – Luke Grimm 60 yard pass from Jason Bean, Seth Keller kick (Drive: 4 plays, 65 yards, 2:38; Kansas 14–7)
- (7:57) KU – Lawrence Arnold 15 yard pass from Jason Bean, Seth Keller kick (Drive: 5 plays, 66 yards, 1:19; Kansas 21–7)
- (1:21) KU – Devin Neal 1 yard run, Seth Keller kick (Drive: 8 plays, 70 yards, 3:42; Kansas 28–7)
- (0:00) UNLV – Jose Pizano 40 yard field goal (Drive: 5 plays, 38 yards, 1:21; Kansas 28–10)

Third Quarter

- (12:15) UNLV – Shelton Zeon III 5 yard pass from Jayden Maiava, Jose Pizano kick (Drive: 5 plays, 42 yards, 1:44; Kansas 28–17)
- (10:30) UNLV – Ricky White 37 yard pass from Jayden Maiava, Jose Pizano kick (Drive: 1 plays, 37 yards, 0:07; Kansas 28–24)

Fourth Quarter

- (14:52) KU – Lawrence Arnold 40 yard pass from Jason Bean, Seth Keller kick (Drive: 10 plays, 99 yards, 6:53; Kansas 35–24)
- (12:06) UNLV – Jacob De Jesus 11 yard run, two-point run conversion failed (Drive: 7 plays, 88 yards, 2:46; Kansas 35–30)
- (11:10) KU – Lawrence Arnold 56 yard pass from Jason Bean, Seth Keller kick (Drive: 2 plays, 61 yards, 0:56; Kansas 42–30)
- (8:16) KU – Luke Grimm 43 yard pass from Jason Bean, Seth Keller kick (Drive: 3 plays, 46 yards, 1:33; Kansas 49–30)
- (6:27) UNLV – Senika McKie 50 yard pass from Jayden Maiava, two-point run conversion failed (Drive: 5 plays, 80 yards, 1:49; Kansas 49–36)

=== Statistics ===
Statistics	KU	UNLV
First downs	22	23
Plays–yards	67–591	59–386
Rushes–yards	39–142	24–95
Passing yards	449	291
Passing: comp–att–int	19–28–3	24–35–2
Time of possession	34:06	25:54

Team	Category	Player	Statistics
Kansas	Passing	Jason Bean	19/28, 449 yards, 6 TD, 3 INT
Kansas	Rushing	Devin Neal	20 carries, 71 yards, 1 TD
Kansas	Receiving	Luke Grimm	4 receptions, 160 yards, 3 TD
UNLV	Passing	Jayden Maiava	24/35, 291 yards, 3 TD, 2 INT
UNLV	Rushing	Jacob De Jesus	6 carries, 40 yards, 1 TD
UNLV	Receiving	Ricky White	7 receptions, 97 yards, TD
