= Austin Booker =

American football player (born 2002)

- Booker (wearing #94) playing for the Bears in 2026

No. 94 – Chicago Bears
- Position: Defensive end
- Roster status: Active

Personal information
- Born: December 14, 2002 (age 23); Greenwood, Indiana, U.S.
- Listed height: 6 ft 5 in (1.96 m)
- Listed weight: 245 lb (111 kg)

Career information
- High school: Center Grove (Greenwood, Indiana)
- College: Minnesota (2021–2022); Kansas (2023)
- NFL draft: 2024: 5th round, 144th overall pick

Career history
- Chicago Bears (2024–present)

Awards and highlights
- Big 12 Defensive Newcomer of the Year (2023); First-team All-Big 12 (2023)

Career NFL statistics as of Week 9, 2026
- Total tackles: 83
- Sacks: 11
- Forced fumbles: 2
- Pass deflections: 4
- Stats at Pro Football Reference

Austin Booker (born December 14, 2002) is an American professional football defensive end for the Chicago Bears of the National Football League (NFL). He played college football for the Minnesota Golden Gophers and Kansas Jayhawks.

== Early life ==
Booker attended Center Grove High School in Greenwood, Indiana. As a junior, he had 67 tackles and eight sacks. He committed to the University of Minnesota to play college football.

== College career ==
Booker played at Minnesota from 2021 to 2022. After redshirting his first year, he played in six games in 2022 and had two tackles. After the season, he entered the transfer portal and transferred to the University of Kansas. In his lone season at Kansas, he played in 12 games and had 56 tackles and eight sacks. After the season, he entered the 2024 NFL draft. He sat out the 2023 Guaranteed Rate Bowl in order to prepare for the draft.

== Professional career ==
Pre-draft measurables
Height	Weight	Arm length	Hand span	Wingspan	40-yard dash	10-yard split	20-yard split	20-yard shuttle	Three-cone drill	Vertical jump	Broad jump
6 ft 4 1/2 in (1.94 m)	240 lb (109 kg)	33 7/8 in (0.86 m)	9 1/4 in (0.23 m)	6 ft 9 3/8 in (2.07 m)	4.78 s	1.69 s	2.80 s	4.47 s	7.28 s	32.5 in (0.83 m)	10 ft 0 in (3.05 m)
All values from NFL Combine/Pro Day

Booker was selected by the Chicago Bears in the fifth round with the 144th overall pick of the 2024 NFL draft. He signed a four-year contract with the team on May 16.

Booker began the 2025 season on injured reserve due to a knee injury suffered in the preseason. He was activated on October 28, 2025, ahead of the team's Week 9 matchup against the Cincinnati Bengals. During the 2025 season, Booker was fined four separate fines from the NFL for unnecessary roughness. Three of them were in games against the Green Bay Packers, and one of those caused the Green Bay Packers quarterback, Jordan Love, to receive a concussion that caused him to miss two games.

== NFL career statistics ==
Legend
**Bold**	Career high

=== Regular season ===
Year	Team	Games		Tackles					Interceptions						Fumbles				
Year	Team	GP	GS	Cmb	Solo	Ast	Sck	TFL	Int	Yds	Avg	Lng	TD	PD	FF	Fmb	FR	Yds	TD
2024	CHI	17	0	21	14	7	1.5	3	0	0	0.0	0	0	0	0	0	0	0	0
2025	CHI	10	9	**35**	**19**	**16**	**4.5**	**5**	0	0	0.0	0	0	**3**	**1**	0	0	0	0
Career		27	9	56	33	23	6.0	8	0	0	0.0	0	0	3	1	0	0	0	0

=== Postseason ===
Year	Team	Games		Tackles					Interceptions						Fumbles				
Year	Team	GP	GS	Cmb	Solo	Ast	Sck	TFL	Int	Yds	Avg	Lng	TD	PD	FF	Fmb	FR	Yds	TD
2025	CHI	2	2	9	3	6	1.0	1	0	0	0.0	0	0	0	0	0	0	0	0
Career		2	2	9	3	6	1.0	1	0	0	0.0	0	0	0	0	0	0	0	0
