= Lawrence Arnold =

American football player

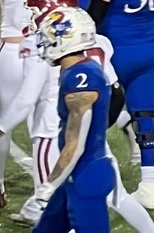
- Arnold with Kansas in 2022

No. 2 – Kansas Jayhawks
- Position: Wide receiver
- Class: Senior

Personal information
- Listed height: 6 ft 2 in (1.88 m)
- Listed weight: 197 lb (89 kg)

Career information
- High school: DeSoto (DeSoto, Texas)
- College: Kansas (2020–2024)
- Stats at ESPN

Lawrence Arnold is an American college football wide receiver for the Kansas Jayhawks.

== Early life ==
Arnold attended DeSoto High School in DeSoto, Texas, where he caught 109 passes for 1,635 yards and 25 touchdowns. A three-star recruit, he committed to play college football at the University of Kansas over other schools such as California, Colorado, Kansas State, Missouri, and Wisconsin.

== College career ==
As a freshman in 2020, Arnold hauled in six receptions for 45 yards. He caught three passes for 33 yards and two touchdown in the 2021 season opener, a 17–14 win over South Dakota 17–14. Arnold finished the season with 27 receptions for 316 yards and three touchdowns. In week 4 of the 2022 season, he made four receptions for 84 yards and a touchdown in a 35–27 win over Duke. In week 7, Arnold brought in five receptions for 113 yards and two touchdowns in a 52–42 loss to Oklahoma. In the 2022 Liberty Bowl, he made eight catches for 119 yards, but the Jayhawks lost in triple overtime versus Arkansas. Arnold finished the 2022 season with 44 receptions for 716 yards and four touchdowns. Ahead of the 2023 season, Arnold was named to the Earl Campbell Tyler Rose Award watchlist.

=== College statistics ===
Year	Team	Receiving					Rushing		
Year	Team	GP	Rec	Yds	Avg	TD	Att	Yds	TD
2020	Kansas	3	6	45	7.5	0	0	0	0
2021	Kansas	10	27	362	11.7	3	0	0	0
2022	Kansas	12	44	716	16.3	4	0	0	0
2023	Kansas	13	44	782	17.8	6	1	10	0
2024	Kansas	12	26	360	13.8	1	2	28	1
Career		53	147	2,219	15.1	14	3	38	1

== Professional career ==
Pre-draft measurables
Height	Weight	40-yard dash	20-yard shuttle	Three-cone drill	Vertical jump	Broad jump
6 ft 2 1/2 in (1.89 m)	197 lb (89 kg)	4.73 s	4.46 s	7.21 s	30.5 in (0.77 m)	9 ft 9 in (2.97 m)
All values from Pro Day
