= Mason Fairchild =

American football player (born 2001)

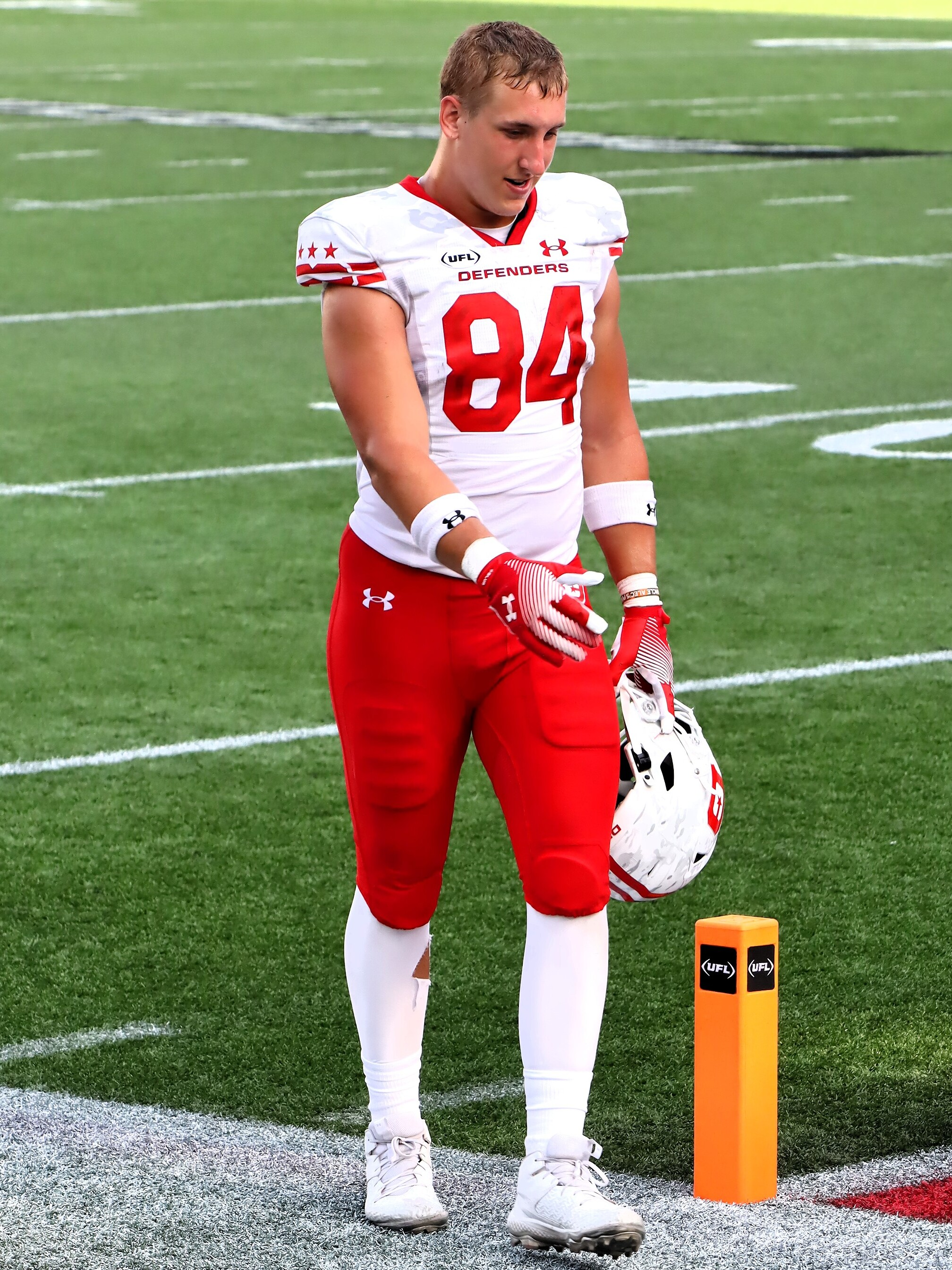
- Fairchild with the DC Defenders in 2025

No. 84 – DC Defenders
- Position: Tight end
- Roster status: Active

Personal information
- Born: August 30, 2001 (age 25)
- Listed height: 6 ft 4 in (1.93 m)
- Listed weight: 256 lb (116 kg)

Career information
- High school: Andale (Andale, Kansas)
- College: Kansas (2019–2023)
- NFL draft: 2024: undrafted

Career history
- New Orleans Saints (2024)*; DC Defenders (2025–present)
- * Offseason or practice squad member only

Awards and highlights
- UFL champion (2025); Second-team All-Big 12 (2022)
- Stats at Pro Football Reference

Mason Fairchild (born August 30, 2001) is an American professional football tight end for the DC Defenders of the United Football League (UFL). He played in college at Kansas.

== Early life ==
Fairchild grew up in Andale, Kansas and attended Andale High School. In Fairchild's high school career he played both ways racking up 630 yards and 35 tackles. Fairchild would decide to commit to play college football at the University of Kansas.

== College career ==
In Fairchild's first season in 2019, he caught two passes for 32 yards. In the 2020 season, Fairchild would haul in five receptions for 57 yards. In week eleven of the 2021 season, Fairchild would bring in two receptions for 31 yards and his first career touchdown, as he helped the Jayhawks stun Texas 57–56. Fairchild would finish the 2021 season with 13 receptions for 128 yards and one touchdown. In week six of the 2022 season, Fairchild would have an excellent performance, making three catches for 80 yards and a touchdown, but Kansas would narrowly fall to TCU 38–31. In the following week, in week seven, Fairchild would have another amazing showing, hauling in six passes for 106 yards and two touchdown, but again the Jayhawks would fall, this time to Oklahoma 52–42. Fairchild would have another great game in the 2022 Liberty Bowl, where he brought in six receptions for 80 yards and a touchdown, but the Jayhawks could not pull off the win, losing 55–53 in triple overtime against Arkansas. Fairchild would finish his breakout 2022 season with 35 receptions for 443 yards and six touchdowns. For his performance on the season, Fairchild was named second team all Big-12. Ahead of the 2023 season, Fairchild was named a preseason third-team all-Big 12 selection by Phil Steele and Athlon Sports. Fairchild would also be named to the John Mackey Award watch list, which is given to the nation's best tight end.

== Professional career ==
Pre-draft measurables
Height	Weight	Arm length	Hand span	Wingspan	40-yard dash	10-yard split	20-yard split	20-yard shuttle	Three-cone drill	Vertical jump	Broad jump	Bench press
6 ft 4 in (1.93 m)	249 lb (113 kg)	31 1/4 in (0.79 m)	9 3/4 in (0.25 m)	6 ft 5 in (1.96 m)	4.91 s	1.77 s	2.80 s	4.46 s	7.19 s	31.5 in (0.80 m)	9 ft 8 in (2.95 m)	27 reps
All values from Pro Day

=== New Orleans Saints ===
On August 3, 2024, Fairchild signed with the New Orleans Saints as an undrafted free agent. He was waived by the Saints on August 7, but re–signed with the team on August 14. He was waived on August 27, and re-signed to the practice squad, but released the next day.

=== DC Defenders ===
On December 12, 2024, Fairchild signed with the DC Defenders of the United Football League (UFL).
