= Luke Grimm =

American football player (born 2001)

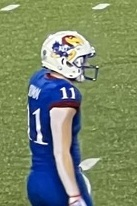
- Grimm with the Kansas Jayhawks in 2022

No. 39 – Los Angeles Chargers
- Position: Wide receiver
- Roster status: Practice squad

Personal information
- Born: August 8, 2001 (age 25); Raymore, Missouri, U.S.
- Listed height: 6 ft 0 in (1.83 m)
- Listed weight: 190 lb (86 kg)

Career information
- High school: Raymore–Peculiar (Peculiar, Missouri)
- College: Kansas (2020–2024)
- NFL draft: 2025: undrafted

Career history
- Los Angeles Chargers (2025–present)*
- * Offseason or practice squad member only
- Stats at Pro Football Reference

Luke Grimm (born August 8, 2001) is an American football wide receiver for the Los Angeles Chargers of the National Football League (NFL). He played college football for the Kansas Jayhawks.

== Early life ==
Grimm attended Raymore–Peculiar High School in Raymore, Missouri, where he hauled in 138 receptions for 2,443 yards and 25 touchdowns, while also rushing for 559 yards and six touchdowns. He also notched 12 tackles, two interceptions and a fumble recovery. Grimm committed to play college football for the Kansas Jayhawks over other schools such as Army, Ball State, Tulane, and Western Michigan.

== College career ==
In week 12 of the 2020 season, Grimm hauled in four passes for 72 yards and two touchdowns in a loss to TCU. He finished his first season in 2020 with 19 receptions for 255 yards and two touchdowns. In week 8 of the 2021 season, Grimm brought in three passes for 50 yards and a touchdown in a 35–23 loss to No. 3 Oklahoma. He finished the season with 22 receptions for 349 yards and three touchdowns. In week 6 of the 2022 season, Grimm racked up six receptions for 73 yards and a touchdown in a 38–31 loss to TCU. In the 2022 Liberty Bowl, he hauled in ten receptions for 167 yards and a touchdown in a triple overtime loss to Arkansas. Grimm finished his 2022 season with 52 receptions for 623 yards and six touchdowns.

=== College statistics ===
| Year | Team | Receiving | | | | | Rushing | | |
| Year | Team | GP | Rec | Yds | Avg | TD | Att | Yds | TD |
|---|---|---|---|---|---|---|---|---|---|
| 2020 | Kansas | 6 | 19 | 255 | 13.4 | 2 | 3 | 10 | 0 |
| 2021 | Kansas | 10 | 22 | 349 | 15.9 | 3 | 0 | 0 | 0 |
| 2022 | Kansas | 12 | 52 | 623 | 12.0 | 6 | 0 | 0 | 0 |
| 2023 | Kansas | 13 | 33 | 555 | 16.8 | 6 | 1 | -6 | 0 |
| 2024 | Kansas | 12 | 51 | 690 | 13.5 | 6 | 11 | 135 | 1 |
| Career | | 53 | 177 | 2,472 | 14.0 | 23 | 15 | 135 | 1 |

== Professional career ==
Pre-draft measurables
| Height | Weight | Arm length | Hand span | Wingspan | 40-yard dash | 10-yard split | 20-yard split | 20-yard shuttle | Three-cone drill | Vertical jump | Broad jump |
|---|---|---|---|---|---|---|---|---|---|---|---|
| 5 ft 10 5/8 in (1.79 m) | 189 lb (86 kg) | 29 in (0.74 m) | 9 in (0.23 m) | 6 ft 0 in (1.83 m) | 4.46 s | 1.52 s | 2.63 s | 4.11 s | 6.78 s | 35.5 in (0.90 m) | 9 ft 11 in (3.02 m) |
All values from Pro Day

Grimm signed with the Los Angeles Chargers as an undrafted free agent on April 26, 2025. On August 26, Grimm was waived and re-signed to the practice squad five days later. He signed a reserve/futures contract with Los Angeles on January 13, 2026.

On August 19, 2026, Grimm was waived/injured by the Chargers and reverted to injured reserve the next day. On August 25, Grimm was waived with an injury settlement. On October 13, Grimm signed with the practice squad.
