= Jason Bean (American football) =

American football player (born 1999)

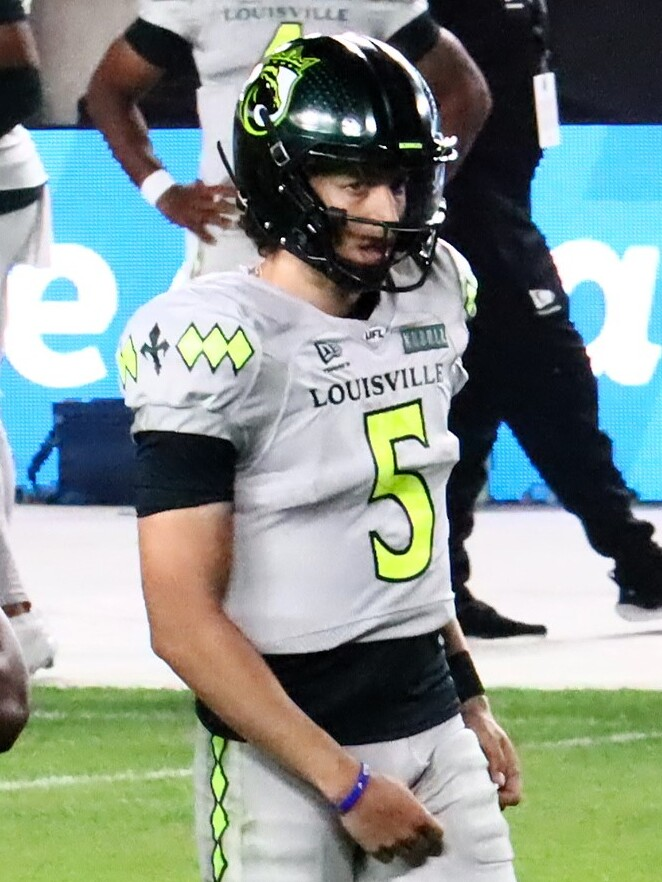
- Bean with the Louisville Kings in 2026

No. 12 – DC Defenders
- Position: Quarterback
- Roster status: Active

Personal information
- Born: June 9, 1999 (age 27)
- Listed height: 6 ft 2 in (1.88 m)
- Listed weight: 200 lb (91 kg)

Career information
- High school: Lake Ridge (Mansfield, Texas)
- College: North Texas (2018–2020); Kansas (2021–2023)
- NFL draft: 2024: undrafted

Career history
- Indianapolis Colts (2024)*; Louisville Kings (2026); DC Defenders (2026–present)
- * Offseason or practice squad member only
- Stats at Pro Football Reference

Jason Bean (born June 9, 1999) is an American professional football quarterback for the DC Defenders of the United Football League (UFL). He played college football for the North Texas Mean Green and the Kansas Jayhawks. He was drafted first overall in the 2024 UFL draft by the Memphis Showboats.

== Early life ==
Bean attended Lake Ridge High School in Mansfield, Texas. After graduation, he committed to playing college football at the University of North Texas.

== College career ==
=== North Texas ===
Bean attended the University of North Texas from 2018 to 2020, during which time he played for the university's football team, the Mean Green. He played in only one game his first year on campus, thus returning as a redshirt freshman his second year. He received various accolades in his third year, including being named Conference USA Offensive Player of the Week, Manning Award Star of the Week, and Earl Campbell Tyler Rose Award Player of the Week. He was also included on the Davey O’Brien Award Great 8 list.

After the conclusion of the 2020 season, Bean entered the NCAA transfer portal.

=== Kansas ===
Bean transferred to the University of Kansas in the spring of 2021 to continue his collegiate career. He was made the starter the 2023 season opener and completed 22 of 28 passing attempts for 276 yards and two touchdowns, while also adding 41 yards on the ground, as he helped the Jayhawks beat Missouri State. In the 2023 Guaranteed Rate Bowl, Bean threw for 449 yards and six passing touchdowns, which were the most passing touchdowns by a Big 12 player in a bowl game in conference history.

=== College statistics ===
Season	Team	Games			Passing								Rushing			
Season	Team	GP	GS	Record (Note: Accounts for only GS as a QB. On 9/8/23 Bean started at WR.)	Cmp	Att	Pct	Yds	Y/A	TD	Int	Rtg	Att	Yds	Avg	TD
2018	North Texas	1	0	—	0	2	0.0	0	0.0	0	1	-100.0	4	14	3.5	0
2019	North Texas	7	0	—	22	35	62.9	176	5.0	3	3	116.2	14	80	5.7	0
2020	North Texas	8	7	3–4	79	155	54.5	1,131	7.8	14	5	145.0	56	346	6.2	5
2021	Kansas	11	9	1–8	102	182	56.0	1,252	6.9	6	6	118.1	92	400	4.3	2
2022	Kansas	12	4	1–3	87	136	64.0	1,280	9.4	14	4	171.1	38	222	5.8	4
2023	Kansas	12	10	6–3	124	199	62.3	2,130	10.7	18	7	175.0	47	280	6.0	3
Career		51	30	11–18	414	699	5,969	59.2	8.5	55	26	149.5	251	1,342	5.3	14

== Professional career ==
Pre-draft measurables
Height	Weight	Arm length	Hand span	Wingspan	40-yard dash	10-yard split	20-yard split	20-yard shuttle	Three-cone drill	Vertical jump	Broad jump
6 ft 1 3/4 in (1.87 m)	196 lb (89 kg)	31 3/4 in (0.81 m)	9 1/8 in (0.23 m)	6 ft 6 1/4 in (1.99 m)	4.56 s	1.62 s	2.63 s	4.45 s	7.07 s	30.5 in (0.77 m)	9 ft 10 in (3.00 m)
All values from Pro Day

=== Indianapolis Colts ===
Bean signed with the Indianapolis Colts as an undrafted free agent on May 9, 2024. On July 17, he was drafted first overall by the Memphis Showboats in the 2024 UFL draft. Bean was waived by the Colts on August 27, during roster cuts and signed with the teams' practice squad the next day. He was listed on the Colts' roster as a quarterback/wide receiver. He signed a reserve/future contract with Indianapolis on January 6, 2025. Despite being under contract with the Colts, Bean has been incorrectly written about by multiple press outlets as being a member of the Showboats in the lead-up to the 2025 UFL season, including ESPN.

On August 26, 2025, Bean was waived by the Colts as part of final roster cuts.

=== Louisville Kings ===
On January 12, 2026, Bean was allocated to the Louisville Kings of the United Football League (UFL). Unlike with the Showboats, Bean agreed to report to Kings training camp and was named the team's starting quarterback. Bean started the Kings' first four games of the season before being traded.

=== DC Defenders ===
On April 19, 2026, Bean was traded to the DC Defenders in exchange for quarterback Mike DiLiello. In the 2026 United Bowl, Bean was forced out of the game due to a left shoulder separation that would ultimately require surgery; the Louisville Kings would go on to beat the Defenders, 27—20.

== UFL career statistics ==
=== Regular season ===
Season	Team	Games			Passing								Rushing			
Season	Team	GP	GS	Record	Cmp	Att	Pct	Yds	Y/A	TD	Int	Rtg	Att	Yds	Avg	TD
2026	LOU	4	4	1–3	58	122	47.5	819	6.7	4	3	70.4	16	63	3.9	0
2026	DC	1	1	0–1	13	28	46.4	165	5.9	1	2	47.5	11	116	10.6	0
Career		5	5	1–4	71	150	47.3	984	6.6	5	5	66.1	27	179	6.6	0
