= Devin Neal =

American football player (born 2003)

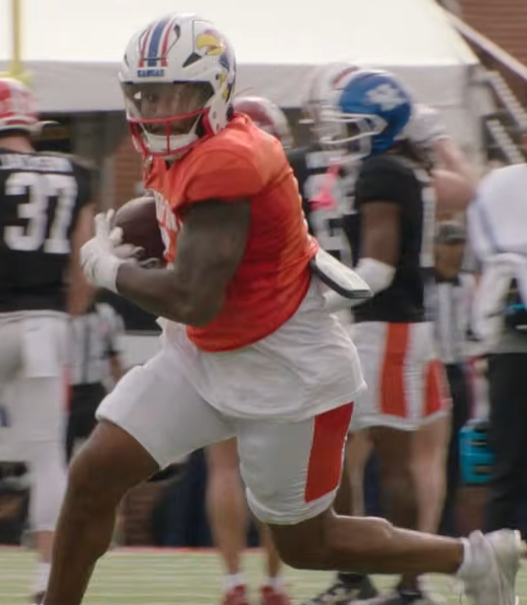
- Neal at the 2025 Senior Bowl

No. 31 – Washington Commanders
- Position: Running back
- Roster status: Practice squad

Personal information
- Born: August 12, 2003 (age 23); Lawrence, Kansas, U.S.
- Listed height: 5 ft 11 in (1.80 m)
- Listed weight: 213 lb (97 kg)

Career information
- High school: Lawrence (KS)
- College: Kansas (2021–2024)
- NFL draft: 2025: 6th round, 184th overall pick

Career history
- New Orleans Saints (2025); Minnesota Vikings (2026)*; Washington Commanders (2026–present)*
- * Offseason or practice squad member only

Awards and highlights
- 2× Second-team All-Big 12 (2023, 2024)

Career NFL statistics as of 2025
- Rushing yards: 206
- Rushing average: 3.6
- Rushing touchdowns: 2
- Receptions: 17
- Receiving yards: 104
- Stats at Pro Football Reference

Devin Marques Neal (born August 12, 2003) is an American professional football running back for the Washington Commanders of the National Football League (NFL). He played college football for the Kansas Jayhawks and was selected by the New Orleans Saints in the sixth round of the 2025 NFL draft.

== Early life ==
Neal grew up in Lawrence, Kansas and attended Lawrence High School. As a senior, he rushed for 1,327 yards and 20 touchdowns and was named first team Class 6A All-State. Neal was rated a four-star recruit and committed to play both football and baseball at the University of Kansas over football offers from Iowa, Kansas State, Nebraska and Oklahoma State.

== College career ==
=== Freshman year ===
Neal played in all 12 of Kansas's games during his freshman season and rushed for 707 yards and eight touchdowns on 158 carries. He became the first freshman in school history to be named the Big 12 Conference Offensive Player of the Week after rushing 24 times for 143 yards and three touchdowns and also catching two passes for 26 yards and one touchdown. Neal finished his freshman year with 158 carries for 707 yards and 8 touchdowns rushing, along with 7 catches for 57 yards and 1 touchdown. He also played in seven games for Kansas's baseball team as a freshman.

=== Sophomore year ===
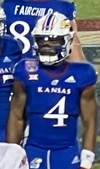
Neal with the Kansas Jayhawks in 2022

Neal was named the Jayhawks' starting running back entering his sophomore season. He was named the Doak Walker Award national running back of the week and the Big 12 Offensive Player of the Week after gaining 224 yards and scoring a touchdown on 32 carries and 110 yards on six receptions in a 37-16 over Oklahoma State. Neal was the first player to have at least 200 rushing yards and 100 receiving yards in the same game and the win made the Jayhawks bowl-eligible for the first time since 2008. Neal played in all 13 of the Jayhawks' games in 2022, rushing 180 times for 1,090 yards and 9 touchdowns while adding 21 catches for 183 yards and 1 touchdown.

=== Junior year ===
Neal played every game for the Jayhawks during his junior season. In a game against Nevada, Neal rushed for 89 yards and scored three touchdowns and also had a career-high 59-yard reception. Against Central Florida, Neal ran the ball 12 times for 154 yards, averaging 12.8 yards per carry with one touchdown. In the game against Oklahoma, Neal had 25 rushes for a total of 112 yards and a touchdown. Against Texas, he rushed for 137 yards on 19 carries and scored three touchdowns. He rushed 18 times against Kansas State for 138 yards and tied his career-high with three touchdowns. Neal had 10 carries against Cincinnati for 108 yards, averaging 10.8 yards per carry and scored two touchdowns in a road victory. In total, Neal rushed 203 times for 1,280 yards and 16 touchdowns, as well as 1 receiving touchdown.

=== Senior year ===
Neal started every game for the Jayhawks during his senior season. In their game against #17 Iowa State, Neal passed June Henley to become Kansas' all-time leader in rushing yards and rushing touchdowns, finishing the game with 116 yards and two touchdowns In his final home game, Neal had one of the defining games of his career, finishing with 287 total yards from scrimmage and four touchdowns against #16 ranked Colorado. Neal finished his career with 4,343 rushing yards and 49 rushing touchdowns, both school records. Neal graduated from Kansas with a Bachelor's Degree in Sports Management and a minor in Business.

=== Statistics ===
Season	Team	Games		Rushing				Receiving			
Season	Team	GP	GS	Att	Yards	Avg	TD	Rec	Yards	Avg	TD
2021	Kansas	11	8	158	707	4.5	8	7	57	8.1	1
2022	Kansas	13	12	180	1,090	6.1	9	21	183	8.7	1
2023	Kansas	13	11	203	1,280	6.3	16	25	217	8.7	1
2024	Kansas	12	12	219	1,266	5.8	16	24	254	10.6	1
Career		49	43	760	4,343	5.7	49	77	711	9.2	4

== Professional career ==
Pre-draft measurables
Height	Weight	Arm length	Hand span	Wingspan	40-yard dash	10-yard split	20-yard split	20-yard shuttle	Vertical jump	Broad jump
5 ft 11 1/8 in (1.81 m)	213 lb (97 kg)	29 5/8 in (0.75 m)	8 1/2 in (0.22 m)	5 ft 11 3/4 in (1.82 m)	4.58 s	1.59 s	2.68 s	4.53 s	37.5 in (0.95 m)	10 ft 4 in (3.15 m)
All values from NFL Combine/Pro Day

=== New Orleans Saints ===
Neal was selected by the New Orleans Saints in the sixth round with the 184th overall pick in the 2025 NFL draft. On May 9, 2025, Neal signed a four-year contract worth $4,451,312. In a Week 14 victory over the Tampa Bay Buccaneers, Neal scored his first career touchdown on a three-yard rush. He played in 10 games for New Orleans during his rookie campaign, including three starts, recording 206 rushing yards and two touchdowns along with 17 catches for 104 yards.

On August 30, 2026, Neal was placed on season–ending injured reserve due to a hamstring injury. On September 3, Neal was released by New Orleans with an injury settlement.

=== Minnesota Vikings ===
On September 30, 2026, Neal was signed to the Minnesota Vikings practice squad. On October 6, he was released from the practice squad.

=== Washington Commanders ===
On October 13, 2026, Neal was signed to the Washington Commanders practice squad.

== NFL career statistics ==
Year	Team	Games		Rushing					Receiving					Kick returns					Fumbles	
Year	Team	GP	GS	Att	Yds	Avg	Lng	TD	Rec	Yds	Avg	Lng	TD	Ret	Yds	Avg	Lng	TD	Fum	Lost
2025	NO	10	3	57	206	3.6	21	2	17	104	6.1	18	0	7	152	21.7	31	0	0	0
Career		10	3	57	206	3.6	21	2	17	104	6.1	18	0	7	152	21.7	31	0	0	0
