= List of Cory Booker 2020 presidential campaign endorsements =

- Campaign: 2020 United States presidential election (Democratic Party primaries)
- Candidate: Cory Booker; U.S. Senator from New Jersey (2013–present); Mayor of Newark, New Jersey (2006–2013)
- Status: Filed at the FEC
- Headquarters: Newark, New Jersey
- Key people: Addisu Demissie (campaign manager); Jenna Lowenstein (deputy campaign manager); Matt Klapper (senior advisor); Modia Butler; Tamia Booker (national political director); Jeff Giertz (national communications director); Michael Tyler (deputy national communications director)
- Slogan(s): Together, America, We Will Rise

Website
- corybooker.com

This is a list of notable individuals and organizations who voiced their endorsement of Cory Booker's campaign for the Democratic Party's nomination for the 2020 U.S. presidential election.

== Federal legislative officials ==
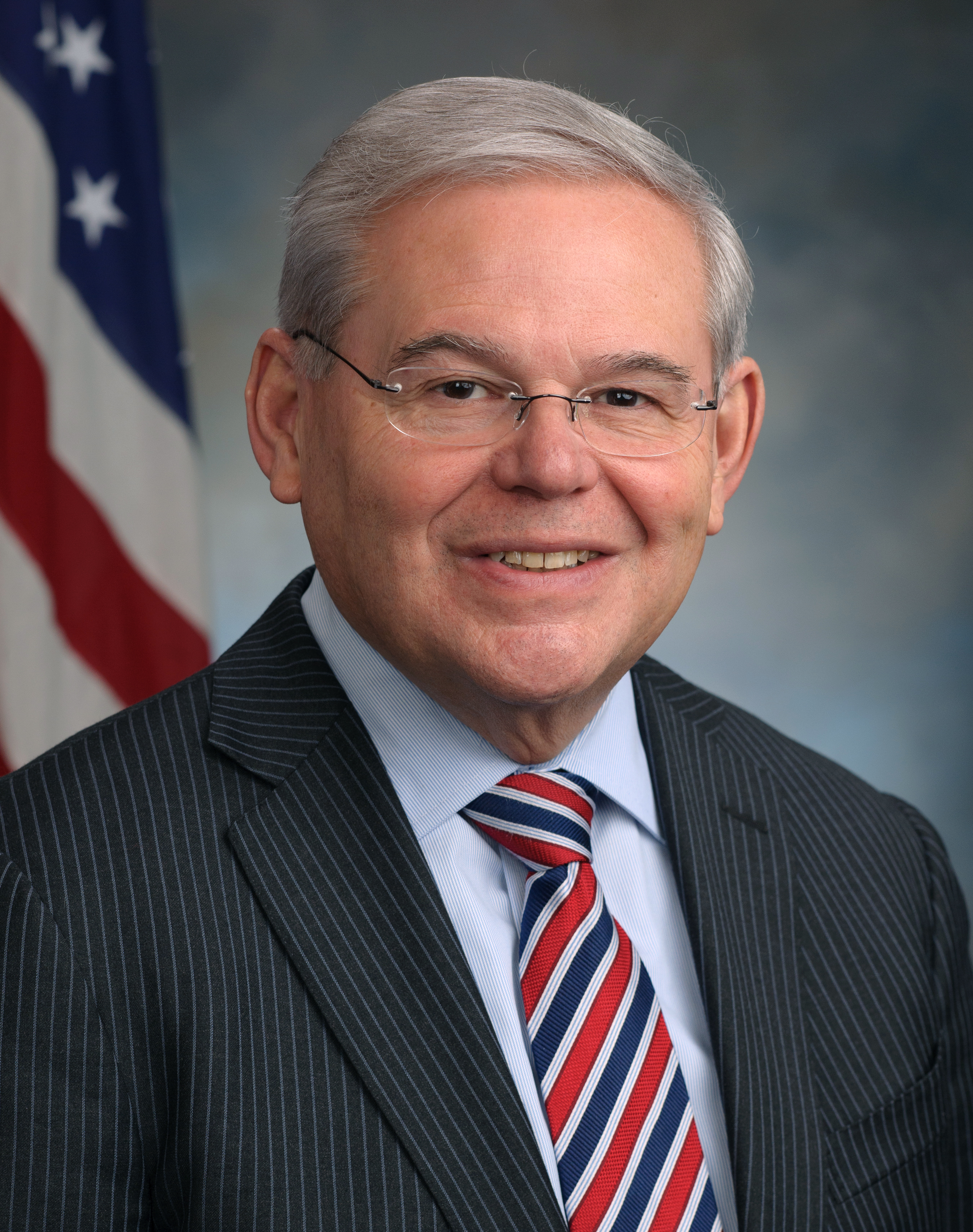
Bob Menendez

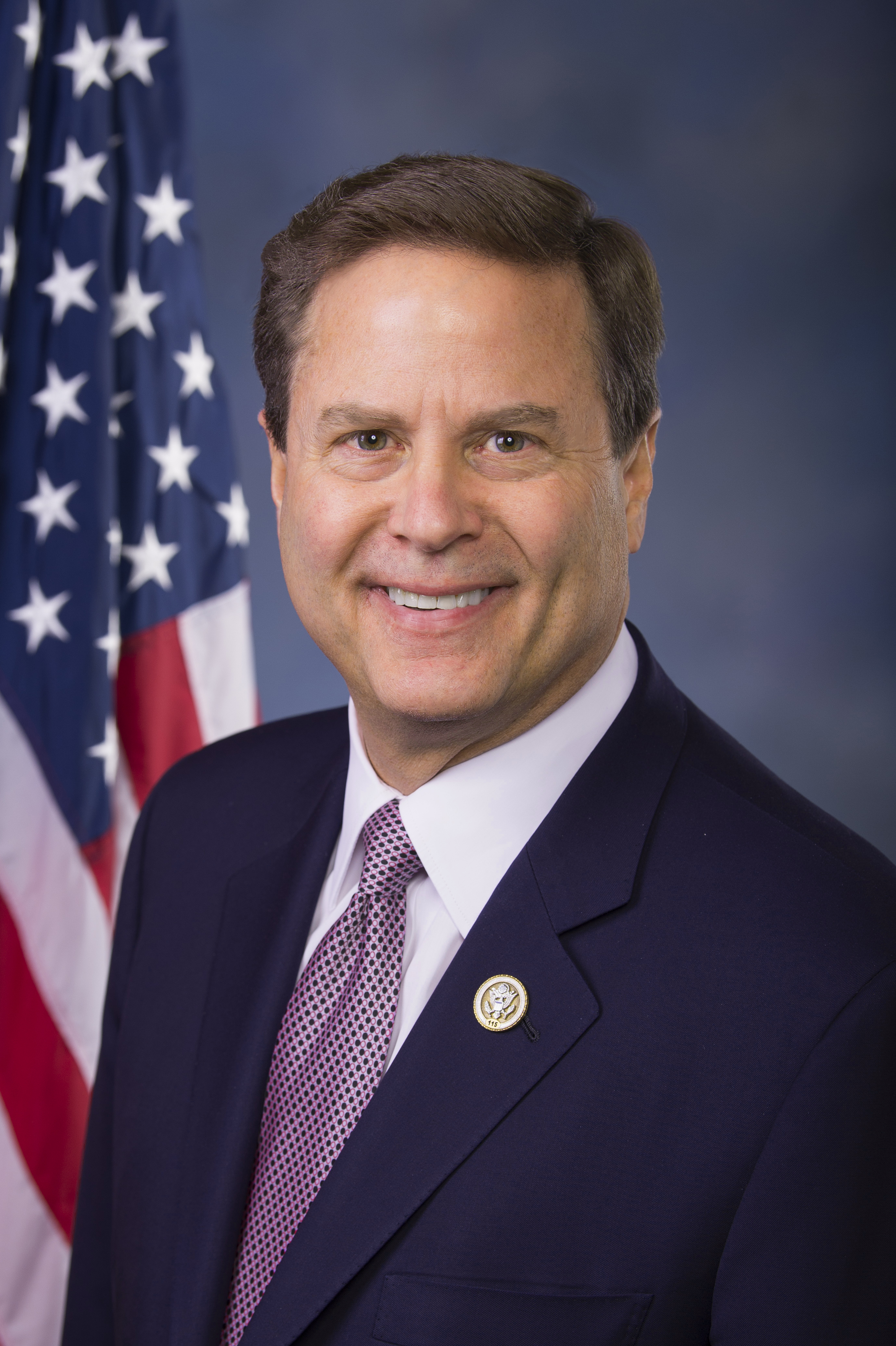
Donald Norcross

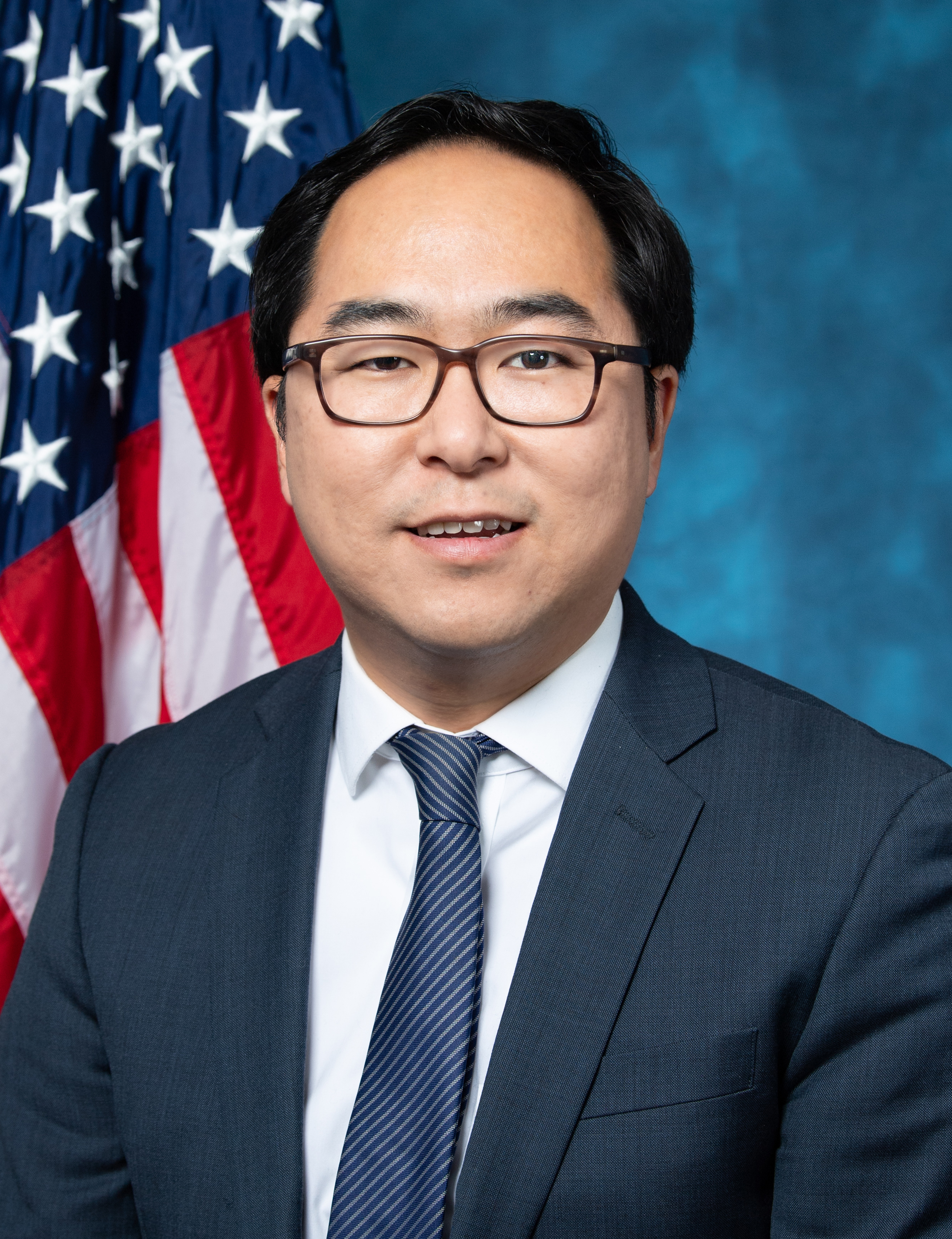
Andy Kim

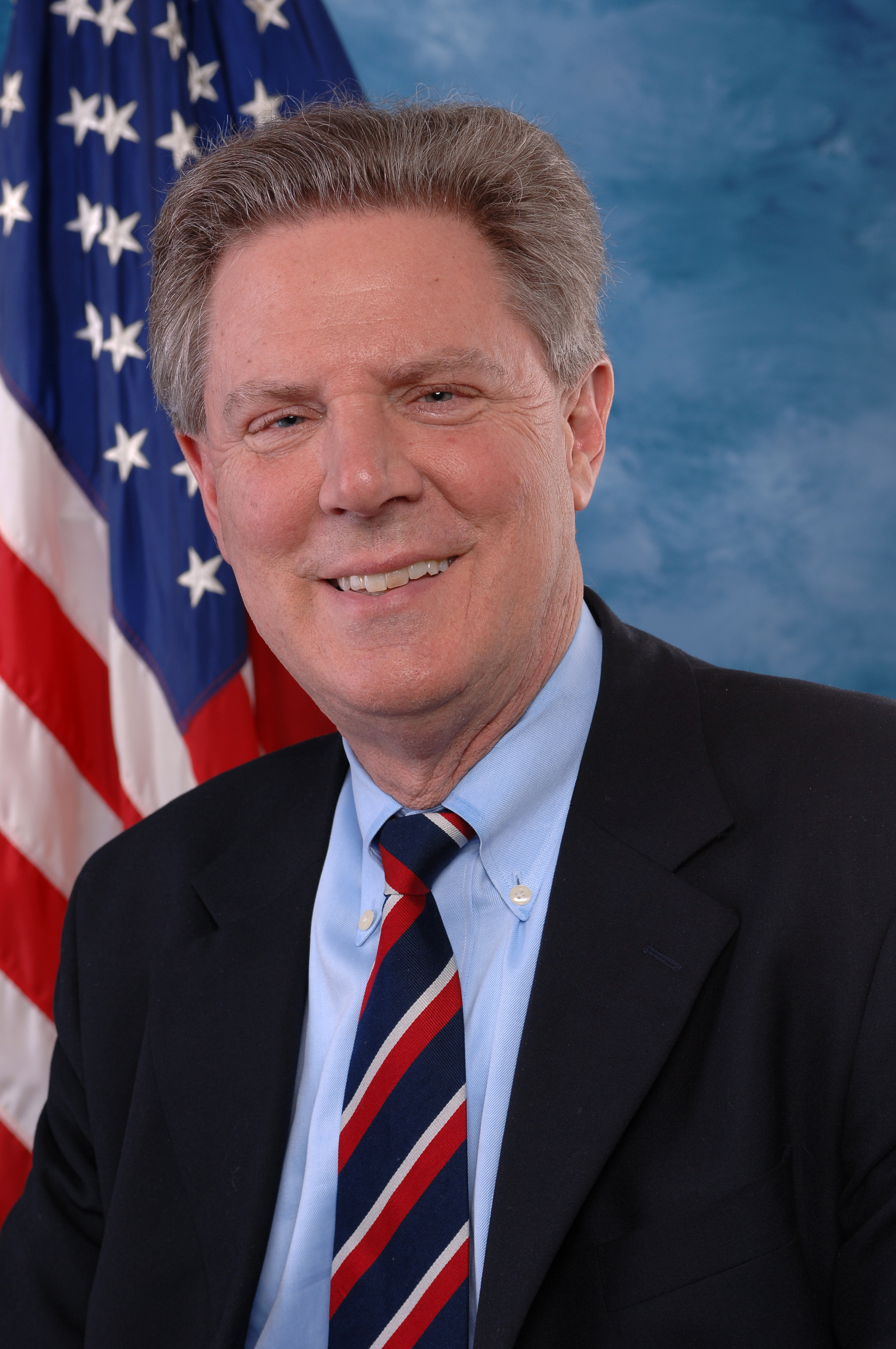
Frank Pallone

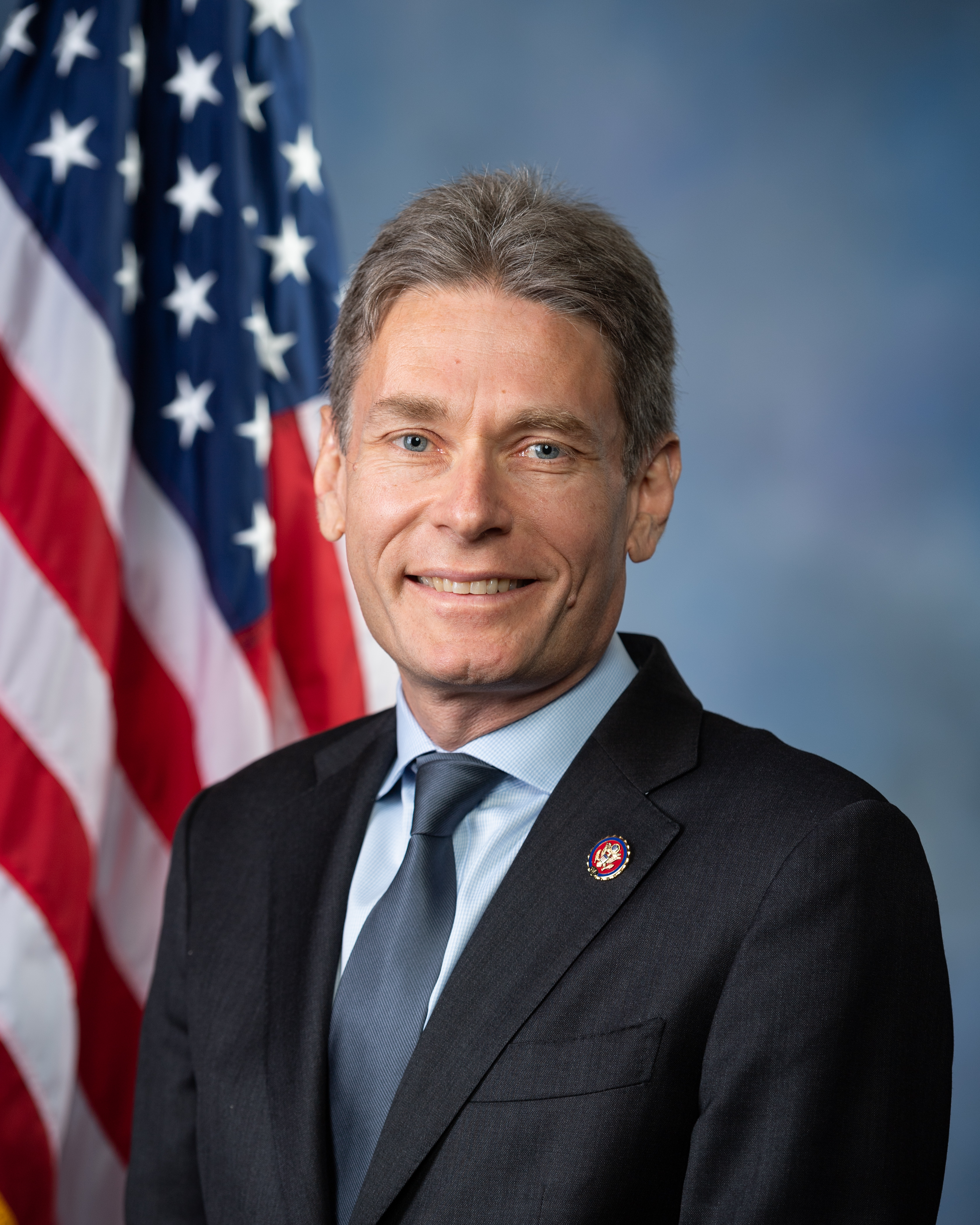
Tom Malinowski

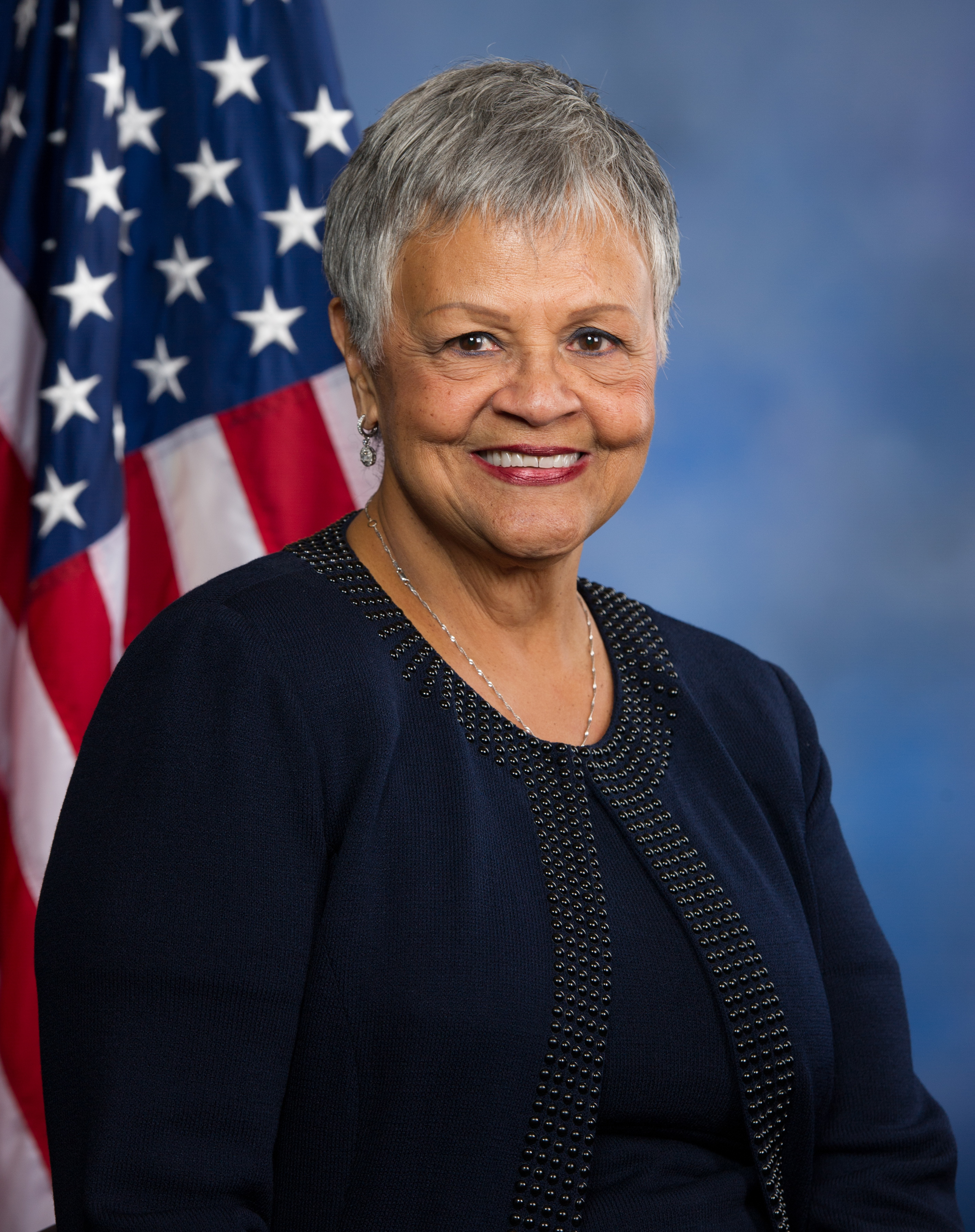
Bonnie Watson Coleman

=== U.S. senators ===
==== Former ====
- Bob Menendez, U.S. Senator from New Jersey (2006-2024); former U.S. Representative from NJ-13 (1993–2006)

=== U.S. representatives ===
==== Current ====
- Donald Norcross, U.S. Representative from NJ-01 since 2014
- ~~Jeff Van Drew, U.S. Representative from NJ-02 since 2019~~ (switched endorsement to President Donald Trump)
- Andy Kim, U.S. Representative from NJ-03 since 2019 (endorsed Pete Buttigieg after Booker withdrew from the race)
- Josh Gottheimer, U.S. Representative from NJ-05 since 2017 (endorsed Mike Bloomberg after Booker withdrew from the race)
- Frank Pallone, U.S. Representative from NJ-06 since 1988; candidate for U.S. Senate in 2013
- Tom Malinowski, U.S. Representative from NJ-07 since 2019 (endorsed Joe Biden after Booker withdrew from the race)
- Albio Sires, U.S. Representative from NJ-08 since 2006
- Bill Pascrell, U.S. Representative from NJ-09 since 1997
- Donald Payne Jr., U.S. Representative from NJ-10 since 2012 (endorsed Joe Biden after Booker withdrew from the race)
- Mikie Sherrill, U.S. Representative from NJ-11 since 2019 (endorsed Mike Bloomberg after Booker withdrew from the race)
- Bonnie Watson Coleman, U.S. Representative from NJ-12 since 2015

== State officials ==
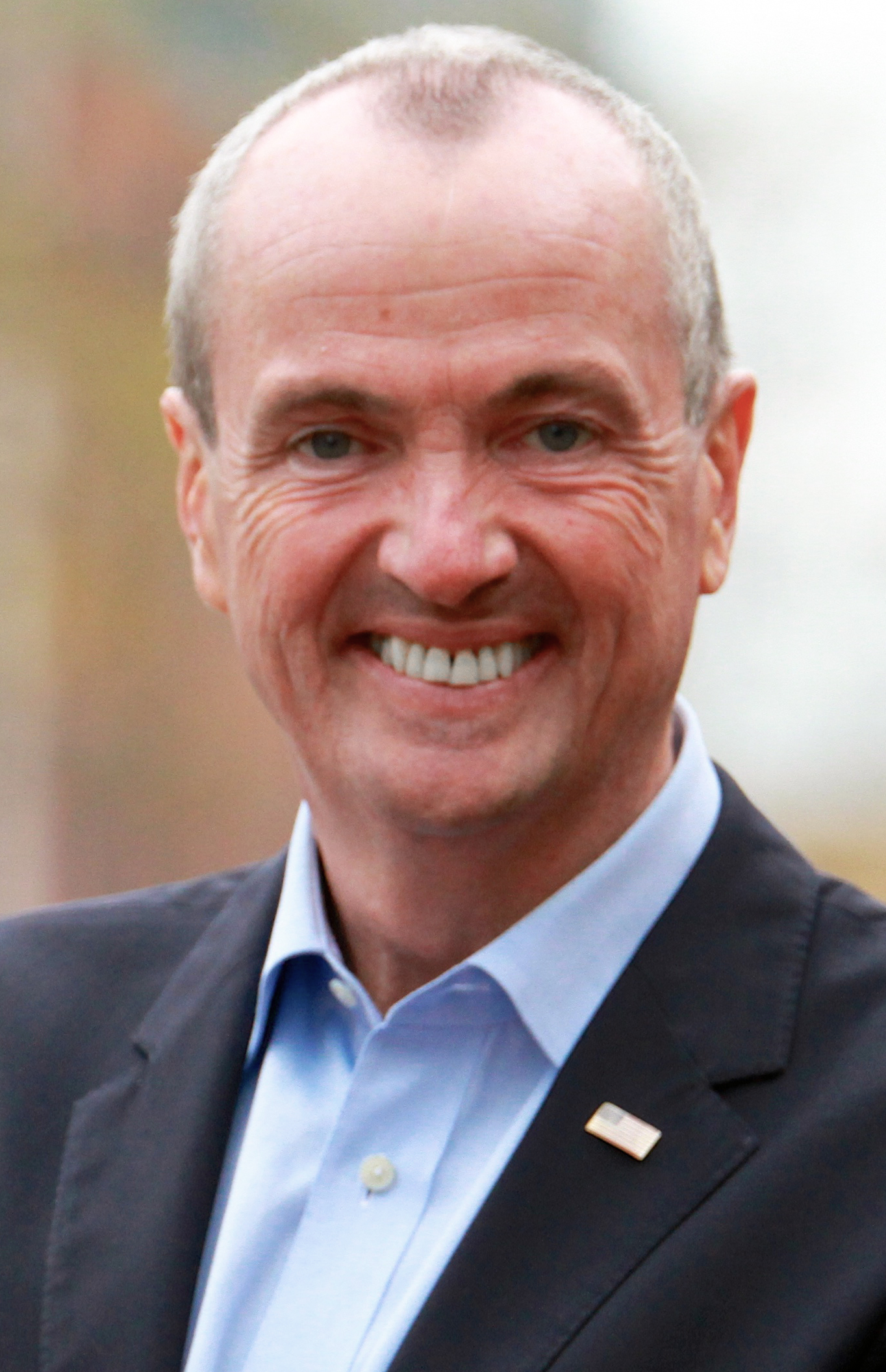
Phil Murphy

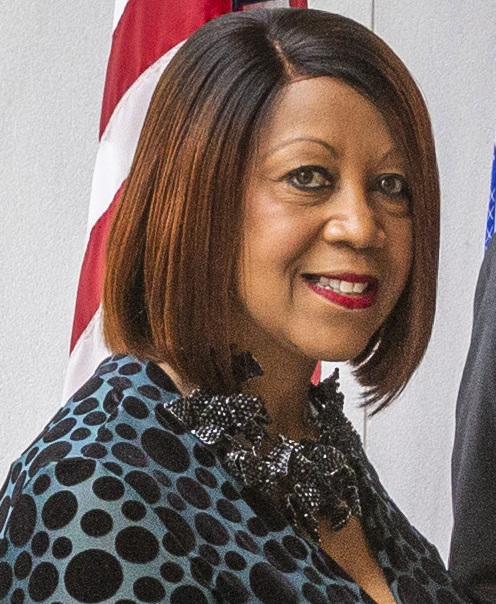
Sheila Oliver

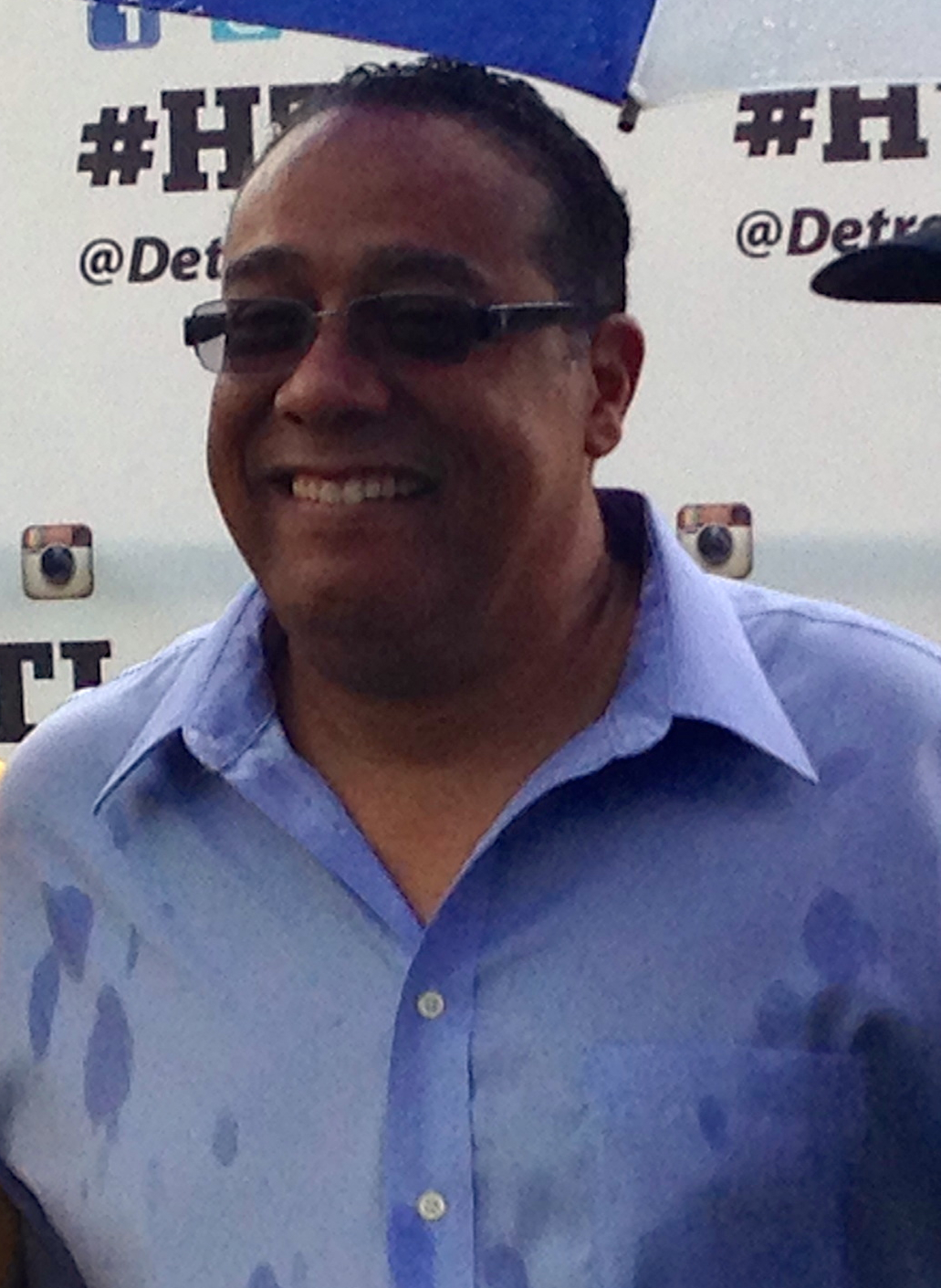
Benny Napoleon

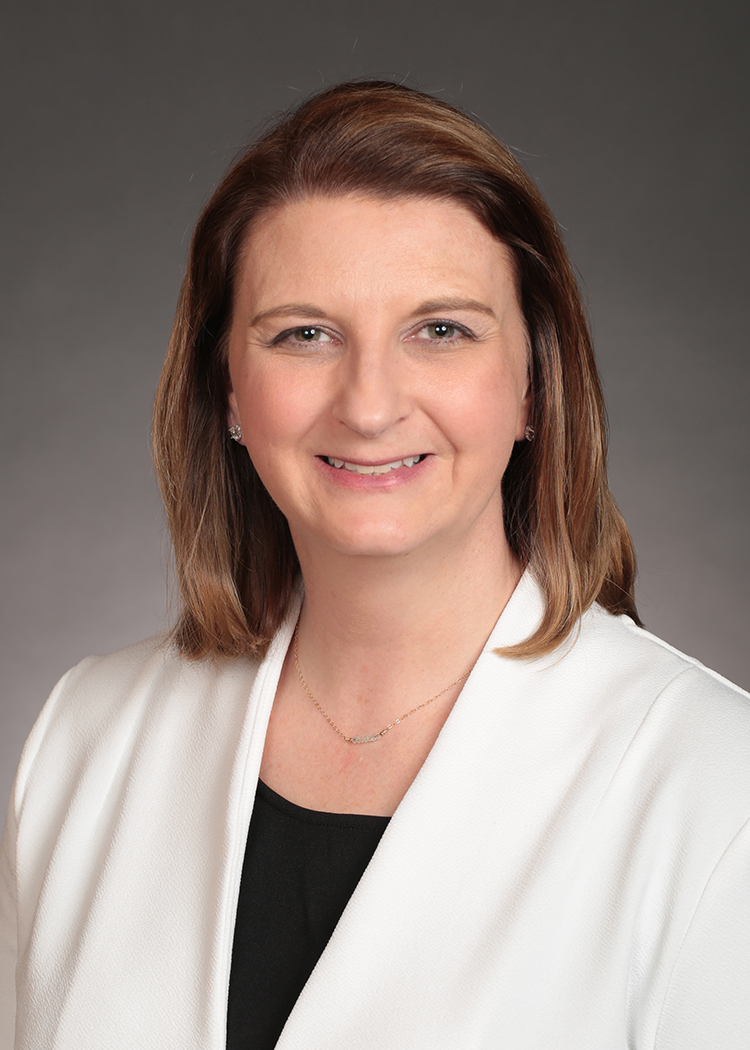
Amy Nielsen

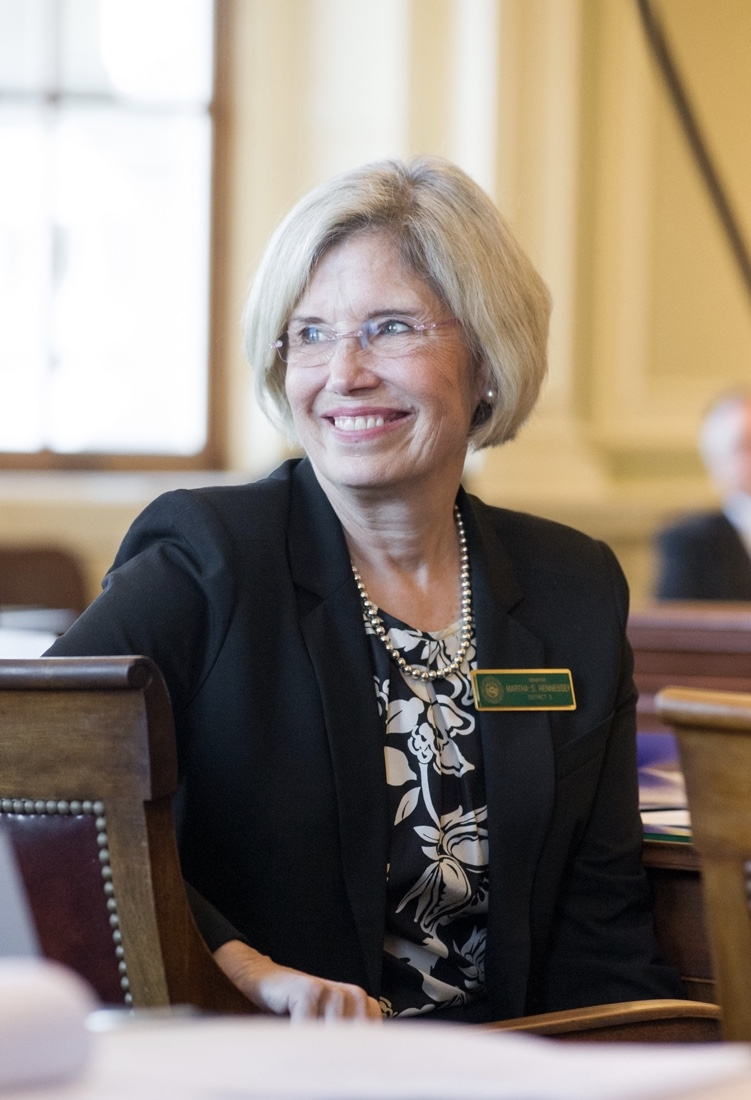
Martha Hennessey

=== Governors ===
==== Former ====
- Phil Murphy, former Governor of New Jersey (2018-2026)

=== Lieutenant governors ===
==== Current ====
- Sheila Oliver, Lieutenant Governor of New Jersey since 2018

=== State executive officials ===
==== Current ====
- Tom DeGise, Hudson County Executive since 2002
- Joseph N. DiVincenzo Jr., Essex County Executive since 2003
- Brian Hughes, Mercer County Executive since 2004
- Benny Napoleon, Sheriff of Wayne County, Michigan since 2009
- James Tedesco, Bergen County Executive since 2015

=== State legislators ===
==== Current ====
- Lester Jackson, Georgia State Senator from District 2 since 2009
- David Dreyer, Georgia State Representative from District 59 since 2017
- Charlie McConkey, Iowa State Representative from District 15 since 2019 (endorsed Amy Klobuchar after Cory Booker withdrew from the race)
- Heather Matson, Iowa State Representative from District 38 since 2019 (endorsed Elizabeth Warren after Booker withdrew from the race)
- Jennifer Konfrst, Iowa State Representative from District 43 since 2019 (endorsed Elizabeth Warren after Booker withdrew from the race)
- Kenan Judge, Iowa State Representative from District 44 since 2019
- Beth Wessel-Kroeschell, Iowa State Representative from District 45 since 2005 (endorsed Elizabeth Warren after Booker withdrew from the race)
- Mark Smith, Iowa State Representative from District 71 since 2001 and former Minority Leader of the Iowa House of Representatives (2013–2019) (endorsed Joe Biden after Booker withdrew from the race)
- Amy Nielsen, Iowa State Representative from District 77 since 2017 (endorsed Joe Biden after Booker withdrew from the race)
- Monica Kurth, Iowa State Representative from District 89 since 2017 (endorsed Amy Klobuchar after Booker withdrew from the race)
- Selena Torres, Nevada Assemblywoman from District 3 since 2018 (co-endorsed Castro, who dropped out first; Torres endorsed Joe Biden after Booker withdrew from the race)
- David H. Watters, New Hampshire State Senator from District 4 since 2012; former New Hampshire State Representative from Stafford's 4th District (2008–2012) (endorsed Deval Patrick after Booker withdrew from the race)
- Martha Hennessey, New Hampshire State Senator from District 5 since 2016 (endorsed Pete Buttigieg after Booker withdrew from the race)
- Jon Morgan, New Hampshire State Senator for District 23 since 2018
- Jacqueline Cali-Pitts, New Hampshire State Senator for Rockingham District 30 since 1998 (endorsed Joe Biden after Booker withdrew from the race)
- Anita Burroughs, New Hampshire State Representative from the Carroll 1 District since 2018 (endorsed Joe Biden after Booker withdrew from the race)
- Bruce Tatro, New Hampshire State Representative from the Cheshire District 15 since 2010
- Roger Dontonville, New Hampshire State Representative from Grafton District 10 since 2016
- Donald Bouchard, New Hampshire State Representative from Hillsborough District 11 since 2018
- Peter Leishman, New Hampshire State Representative from various districts (1996–2002), from Hillsborough District 6 (2006–2008), Hillsborough District 3 (2008–2010) and Hillsborough District 24 since 2011
- Patricia Klee, New Hampshire State Representative from Hillsborough District 30 since 2016
- Latha Mangipudi, New Hampshire State Representative from Hillsborough District 35 since 2013 (endorsed Amy Klobuchar after Booker withdrew from the race)
- Christy Bartlett, New Hampshire State Representative from Merrimack District 19 since 2012
- Katherine Rogers, New Hampshire State Representative from the Merrimack 28 District since 2012
- Kate Murray, New Hampshire State Representative from Rockingham District 24
- Jeffrey Salloway, New Hampshire State Representative from the Strafford District 5 since 2016 (endorsed Elizabeth Warren after Booker withdrew from the race)
- Timothy Horrigan, New Hampshire State Representative from Strafford District 6 since 2010
- Linn Opderbecke, New Hampshire State Representative from the Strafford District 15 since 2016 (endorsed Amy Klobuchar after Booker withdrew from the race)
- Gerri Cannon, New Hampshire State Representative from the Strafford District 18 since 2018
- Cecilia Rich, New Hampshire State Representative from the Strafford District 18 since 2018 (endorsed Bernie Sanders after Booker withdrew from the race)
- Lee Walker Oxenham, New Hampshire State Representative from the Sullivan 1 District since 2014 (endorsed Elizabeth Warren after Booker withdrew from the race)
- John Knowles, former New Hampshire State Representative from Hillsborough District 27 (2006–2010)
- Stephen M. Sweeney, New Jersey State Senator from District 3 since 2002; President of the Senate since 2010
- Fred H. Madden, New Jersey State Senator from District 4 since 2004
- James Beach, New Jersey State Senator from District 6 since 2009
- Nicholas Scutari, New Jersey State Senator from District 22 since 2004
- Craig Coughlin, New Jersey Assemblyman from District 19 since 2010; Speaker of the Assembly since 2018
- Leola Robinson-Simpson, South Carolina State Representative from District 25 since 2013 (endorsed Tom Steyer after Booker withdrew from the race)
- John Richard C. King, South Carolina State Representative from District 49 since 2009
- Davis Crowley, Wisconsin State Representative from District 17 since 2016

==== Former ====
- Nate Willems, former Iowa State Representative from District 29 (2009–2013) (Previously endorsed Beto O'Rourke; endorsed Biden after Booker withdrew from the race)
- Katie Wheeler, former New Hampshire State Senator for District 21 (1996–2002); former New Hampshire State Representative (1988–1996)
- Ben Nesselhuf, former South Dakota State Senator from District 17 (2005–2011) and former South Dakota State Representative from District 17 (2001–2005); former Chair of the South Dakota Democratic Party (2011–2013)

== Local and municipal officials ==
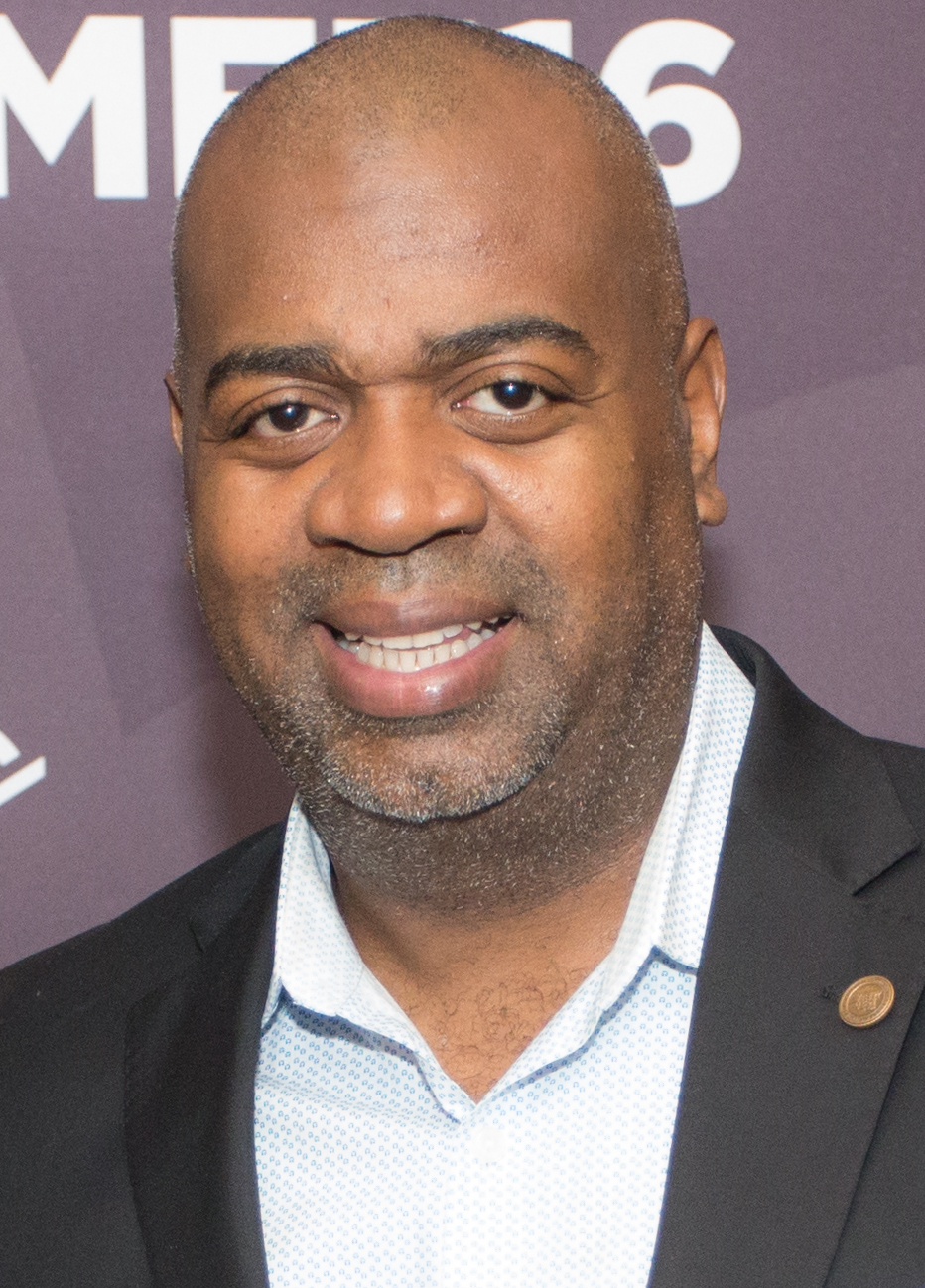
Ras Baraka

=== Mayors ===
==== Current ====
- Ras Baraka, Mayor of Newark, New Jersey since 2014
- Jim Bouley, Mayor of Concord, New Hampshire since 2008
- Courtney Clarke, Mayor of Waukee, Iowa since 2020
- Terrence Culbreath, Mayor of Johnston, South Carolina since 2014
- Gregory Ginyard, Mayor of Jenkinsville, South Carolina
- Julia Nelson, Mayor of Manning, South Carolina since 2011
- Terence Roberts, Mayor of Anderson, South Carolina since 2006 (endorsed Pete Buttigieg after Booker withdrew from the race)
- Bruce Teague, Mayor of Iowa City, Iowa since 2020 (endorsed Pete Buttigieg after Booker withdrew from the race)
- Harold Thompson, Mayor of Union, South Carolina

==== Former ====
- Samuel Murray, Mayor of Port Royal, South Carolina (1995–2019)

=== Municipal legislators ===
==== Current ====
- Mildred Crump, Newark City Council president from 2006 to 2010 and from 2013
- Carlos Gonzalez, Newark City Council member from 2006 to 2010 and from 2013
- Pamela Goynes-Brown, North Las Vegas, Nevada city council member from District 2 since 2011
- John Sharpe James, Newark City Council member since 2013
- Joe McCallum, Newark City Council member from 2014
- LaMonica McIver, Newark City Council member from 2018
- Eddie Osbourne, Newark City Council member from 2014
- Luis A. Quintana, At-large Newark, New Jersey City Councilman 1994–2013 and since 2014; former Mayor (2013–2014)
- Anibal Ramos, Newark City Council member from 2006

==== Former ====
- Theron Goynes, former North Las Vegas, Nevada city council member (1979–1997), president pro tempore of the council (1985–1997)

== Party officials ==
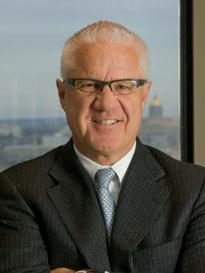
Jerry Crawford

=== Current ===
- Nikki Ford Barnes, DNC member
- Clay Middleton, DNC member and later South Carolina state representative since 2026
- Khary Penebaker, DNC member (endorsed Michael Bloomberg after Booker with drew from the race)
- Melinda Jones, member of the Iowa Democratic Party State Central Committee; former Chair of the Wapello County, Iowa Democratic Party
- Bryce Smith, Chairman of the Dallas County, Iowa Democratic Party
- Michelle Smith, Chairwoman of the Jasper County, Iowa Democratic Party
- Joe Andal, Burlington County, New Jersey Democratic Party chair since 2010
- Jerry Crawford, attorney, former chair of the Polk County, Iowa Democratic Party, and Democratic campaign operative
- Dave Brown, Chairman of the Monmouth County, New Jersey Democratic Party since 2017
- John Currie, Chairman of the New Jersey Democratic Party
- Steve Errickson, Chairman of the Cumberland County, New Jersey Democratic Party since 2018
- Steve Caltaiano, Salem County, New Jersey Democratic Party chair since 2008
- Amy DeGise, Hudson County, New Jersey Democratic Party chair since 2018
- Wyatt Earp, Ocean County, New Jersey Democratic Party chair since 2005
- LeRoy J. Jones Jr., Chairman of the Essex County, New Jersey Democratic Party
- Kevin McCabe, Middlesex County, New Jersey Democratic Party chair since 2013
- Janice Mironov, Mercer County, New Jersey Democratic Party chair since 2018
- Chip Morrison, Morris County, New Jersey Democratic Party chair since 2014
- Tom Palmieri, Warren County, New Jersey Democratic Party chair since 2013
- Arlenes Quinones Perez, Chairwoman of the Hunterdon County, New Jersey Democratic Party since 2006
- Brendan Sciarra, Cape May County, New Jersey Democratic Party chair since 2017
- Marguerite Schaffer, Somerset County, New Jersey Democratic Party chair since and DNC member from 2008 at the latest (Note: Date at which she became chair unclear)
- Mike Suleiman, Atlantic County, New Jersey Democratic Party chair since 2016

=== Former ===
- Joan Amos, former Lucas County, Iowa Democratic Party Chair (previously endorsed John Delaney)
- David Betsworth, former Warren County, Iowa Democratic Party Chair
- Julie Stewart, former Dallas County, Iowa Democratic Party Chair
- Paul Drager, former Chair of the Somersworth, New Hampshire Democratic Party
- Leslie Huhn, former Sussex County, New Jersey Democratic Party chair (2015–2019)
- Lou Stellato, former Bergen County, New Jersey Democratic Party chair (2011–2019)
- Christale Spain, former Executive Director of the South Carolina Democratic Party (2016–? (Note: Either 2018 or 2019)) (Note: Unclear, but term ended by February 2019)

== Individuals ==
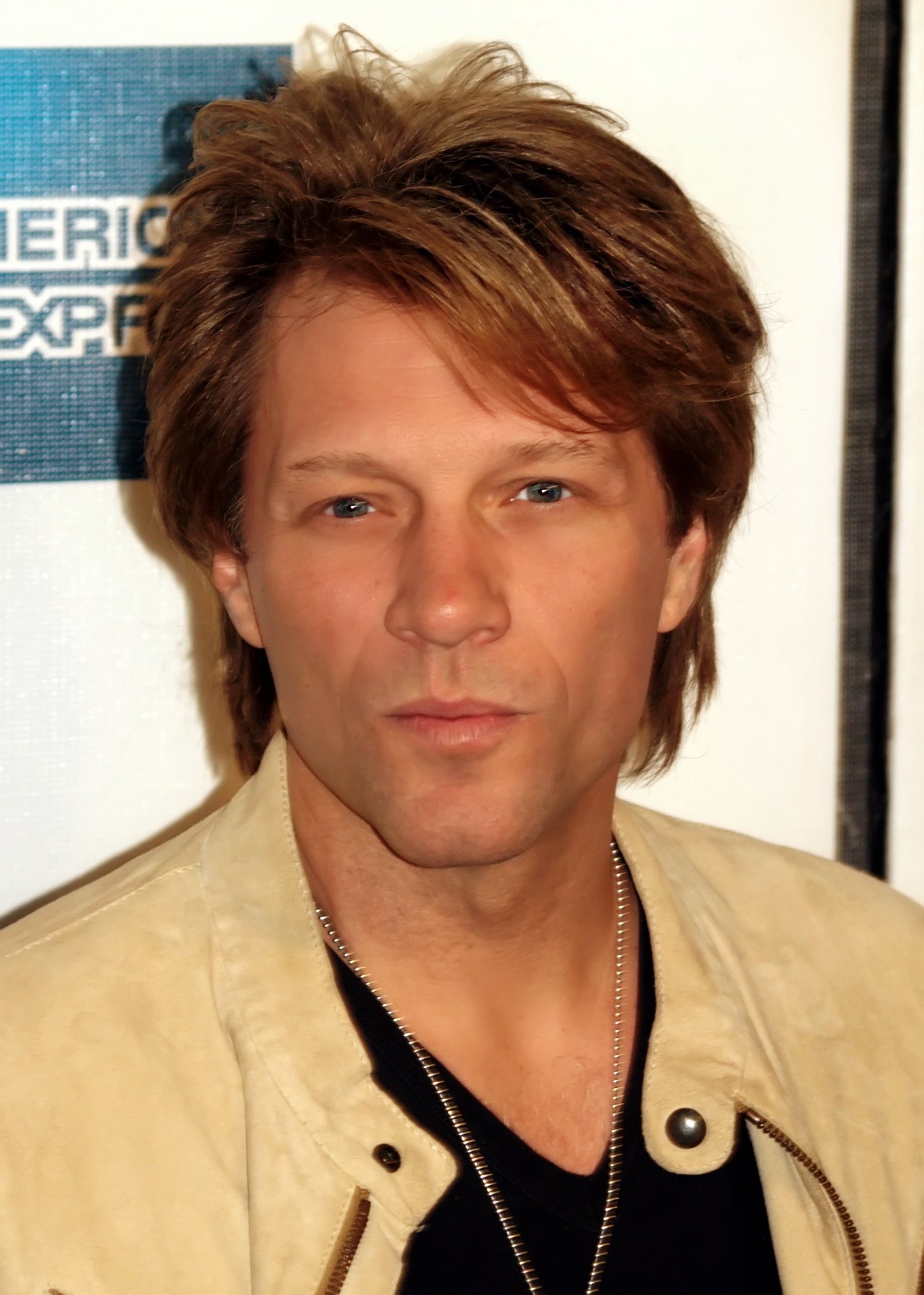
Jon Bon Jovi

- Jon Bon Jovi, American singer and musician
- Rosario Dawson, actress (endorsed Bernie Sanders after Cory Booker withdrew from the race)
- Tammy Murphy, banker; First Lady of New Jersey since 2018
