= Oxaal =

Oxaal is a surname. Notable people with the surname include:

- Adrian Oxaal (born 1965), American-born English musician and music educator
- Ariel Oxaal, American politician
- Thomas Oxaal (born 1999), Norwegian skier

== See also ==
- Oxalis
