= Iowa's 77th House of Representatives district =

American legislative district

House District 77
- Type: District of the Lower house
- Location: Iowa
- Representative: Jeff Cooling
- Parent organization: Iowa General Assembly

The 77th District of the Iowa House of Representatives in the state of Iowa is part of Linn County.

== Current elected officials ==
Jeff Cooling is the representative currently representing the district.

== Past representatives ==
The district has previously been represented by:

- Byron G. Allen, 1927–1933
- Daniel L. Bray, 1971–1973
- Jay Mennenga, 1973–1977
- John Pelton, 1977–1983
- Mark A. Haverland, 1983–1993
- Wayne H. McKinney, 1993–1995
- David G. Lord, 1995–2001
- Jodi Tymeson, 2001–2003
- Mary Mascher, 2003–2013
- Sally Stutsman, 2013–2017
- Amy Nielsen, 2017–2023
