= Prairie High School (Iowa) =

Public secondary school in Cedar Rapids, Iowa, United States

Location
- 401 76th Avenue SW; Cedar Rapids, Iowa 52404; United States; 41°54′12.8″N 91°40′10.5″W

Information
- Type: Public Secondary
- Opened: 1956
- School district: College Community School District
- Superintendent: Doug Wheeler
- Principal: Spence Evans
- Staff: 72.72 (FTE)
- Grades: 10-12
- Student to teacher ratio: 17.48
- Colours: Orange and Black
- Slogan: Success For All
- Fight song: Prairie High March
- Athletics conference: Mississippi Valley Conference
- Sports: 19
- Mascot: Harvey the Hawk
- Nickname: Hawks
- Newspaper: Hawk Talk
- Yearbook: Hawk
- Website: Official website
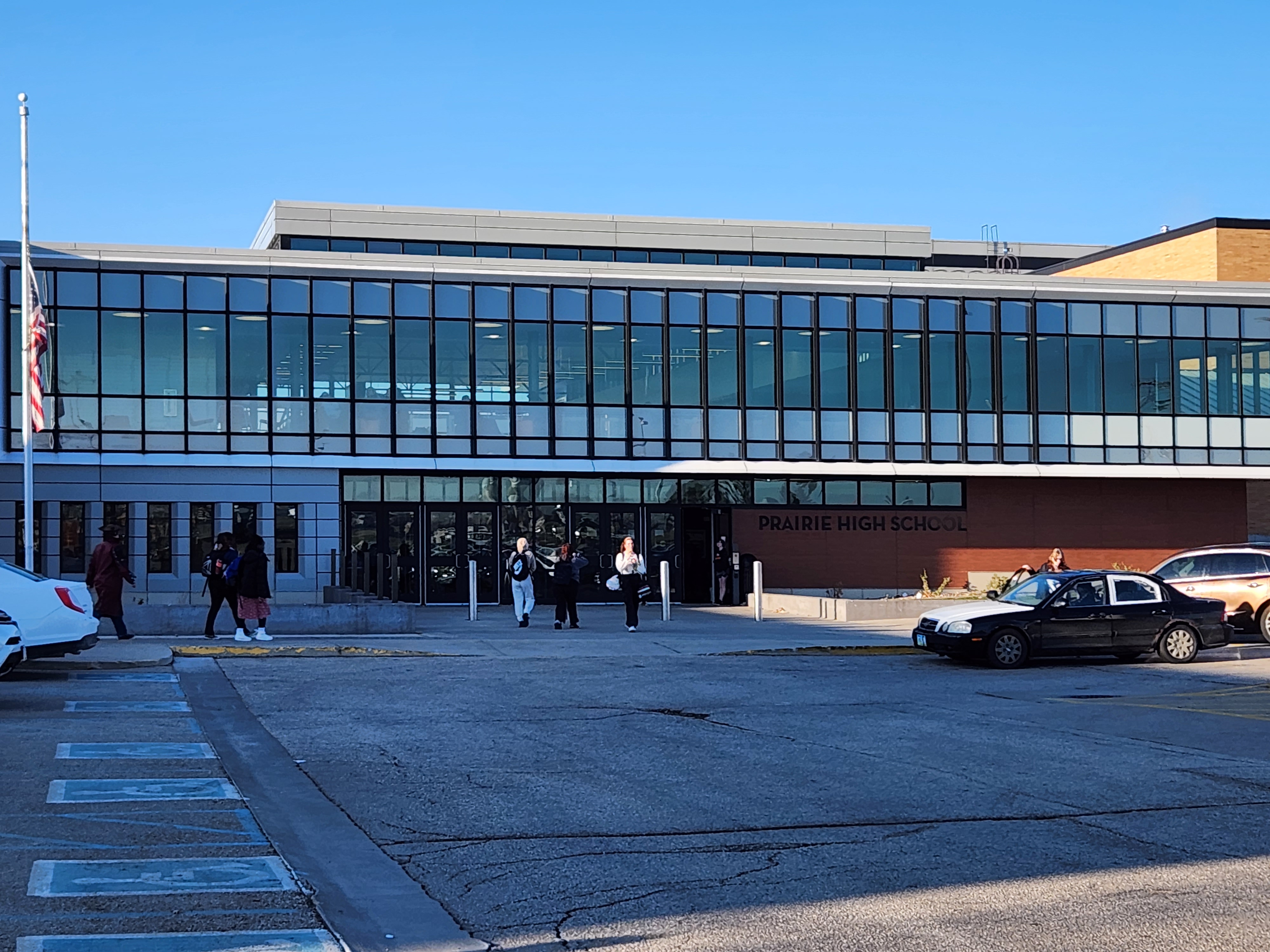

Prairie High School is a public high school in the College Community School District in Cedar Rapids, Iowa. The school opened in 1956 after the consolidation of multiple schools in the Cedar Rapids Metropolitan Area. Prairie High School serves the communities of Walford, Fairfax, Swisher, Shueyville, Ely, Southwest Cedar Rapids, and surrounding areas.

== History ==
In the spring of 1953, voters in Fairfax, College, and Putnam Townships voted to consolidate into 1 school district named the College Community School District. In 1954, the school board purchased 40 acres of land across the road from College Township Elementary to build a new high school. This remains the site of Prairie High School.

=== 1956-1959 ===
At the start of the second semester for the 1956-57 school year, Prairie High School opened for 8th, 9th, and 10th grades. The School Board chose the name "Prairie High School" based on an essay written by an eighth grade student, Kathleen Booth. A gymnasium was built for the 57-58 school year, and basketball and football programs began. 11th and 12th graders joined in the 58-59 school year, and on May 28, 1959, 61 students graduated in Prairie's first commencement ceremony.

=== 1960-1989 ===
Freshman move to the new junior high in 1961.

The Minervian Chapter of National Honor Society was established at Prairie High School with the first induction of students being held on April 19, 1961.

On September 15, 1967, the football field was dedicated and officially named John W. Wall Field in memory of Prairie High School graduate, John Wall, who was killed in action during the Vietnam War.

In October 1973, the school board and Kirkwood Community College school board reached an agreement in which approved PHS students could attend certain KCC classes. The College Community School district would pay the tuition for these students.

The Loren Slycord Memorial Smoking Lounge for students was established in the outdoor courtyard between two wings of the high school (Current D and C hallways) during the 73-74 school year.

Freshman would rejoin the high school in 1989.

=== Fire of 1974 ===
On March 4, 1974, there was a significant fire in the high school building with damage exceeding $100,000. Arson was suspected and later investigation established that a night watchman, provided by the security company that the school district had engaged for protection, had set the fire. The largest amount of the damage was from smoke, which enveloped the whole building. Classes were suspended for one week for cleanup.

=== 1990–present ===
In 1990, a $10.6 million addition was constructed which included: a new media center, cafeteria, kitchen, industrial technology labs and classrooms, art and consumer science labs and classrooms, Success Center study/resource area, 2000 seat gym, 525 seat auditorium, locker rooms, wrestling rooms and all classrooms were carpeted and air conditioned. The former auditorium was converted into what is known as the "Circle." The circle houses band and choir rooms, as well as storage and practice rooms.

In 1999, a $9 million bond referendum was approved to construct: 12 new classrooms, 4 new computer labs, a 100-seat AV presentation room, 200 seat student life area, expanded Success Center and guidance area, technology storage and work area, an addition to the cafeteria, new weight and wellness room, 2 additional lighted tennis courts, and an additional 250 car parking lot.

On January 24, 2006 the voters of the College Community School district approved issuance of general obligation bonds to finance the construction of a new 1,000 seat performing arts auditorium. The Concert Hall at College Community, which is located on the west end of the high school, held its inaugural performance on December 8, 2008. The 525 seat auditorium built in 1990 is now known as the College Community Theatre and hosts Speech and Drama events, as well as smaller music events and some assemblies.

Freshman leave the high school for the new Prairie Point in 2009.

John Wall Field was heavily renovated in the summer of 2011 in preparation for the 2011-12 school year. Improvements include a new storage building and ticket booth behind the north end zone, a new entrance area for the home stands, expanded seating on the home bleachers, brand new bleachers for visiting team fans, and a new Field Turf playing surface, designed for both football and soccer.

It was announced on April 11, 2012, that all Prairie High School students will be issued a district-owned computer, starting the 2012-13 school year. All Prairie High School students are provided with 11-inch MacBook Air laptops, to use at school and at home.

On January 31, 2013, district superintendent John Speer told media that Principal Mark Gronemeyer was going to resign from his position, effective immediately. Gronemeyer was subsequently reassigned to a newly created job in the district office for the remainder of the year, given the title of Secondary Curriculum Specialist. Both resignations and the reassignment were approved on February 1. Many in the community began to wonder why the district would unexpectedly reassign the principal in the middle of the term to a newly created position, knowing he would resign at the end of the year, and rumors began that an incident occurred that forced the school board to remove him from Prairie High School. Speer said he could not directly comment on the suspicious nature of the situation.

Associate Principal Erik Anderson was named Principal on an interim basis on February 1, 2013. On May 3, 2013, after 3 months of work as the interim principal, Erik Anderson was named the new principal of Prairie High School.

== Athletics ==
Prairie High School's first athletic programs were the football and boys' basketball programs, both beginning in the 1957-58 school year. The first gym, known as the North Gym, was opened on January 15, 1958 with a basketball game. Girls' athletics began in 1969 with the establishment of golf, tennis, and the now-defunct gymnastics team.

Prairie remained unaffiliated to an athletic conference until becoming a charter member of the East Central Iowa Conference. They remained there until the conference dissolved after the 1985-86 school year. They then joined the Mississippi Valley Conference, where they remain as a member in all sports but boys and girls swimming.

Prairie is currently the largest high school in Iowa that does not have its own swim team. This is largely due to the lack of an on-campus pool. The school established a girls swim team was established in 1970, who competed at the Cedar Rapids YMCA. The team later went into a co-op agreement with Williamsburg High School, and now swims with Jefferson High School in Cedar Rapids. However, this is a case of Prairie students on the Jefferson team, not a joint Prairie-Jefferson team. When the girls began their co-op agreement with Jefferson in 2011-2012, Prairie boys were given a chance to swim competitively for the first time in school history.

The wrestling team was established in 1960 with 24 wrestlers participating. Since then, the team has won 4 IHSAA championships, two at the traditional state tournament, two at the State Team Duals. The team has 26 individual championships. Throughout the history of the East Central Iowa Conference, Prairie was the powerhouse wrestling team, winning 19 of 20 conference team titles. The team has won numerous MVC dual titles, and won their first Mississippi Valley Conference meet of the 21st century in the 2013 season, ending a 17-year drought and a 9-year win streak by Iowa City West High School. They have since won 3 consecutive Mississippi Valley Conference tournament titles.

Prairie's two main rivals (in many activities, including athletics and competitive music) are Linn-Mar High School in Marion and Jefferson High School in Cedar Rapids. Linn-Mar is Prairie's longest-held rivalry, as both schools were charter members of the East Central Iowa Conference and together moved to the Mississippi Valley when the conference dissolved in 1986. The Jefferson rivalry has been dubbed the "Kolach Bowl", as both schools are on Cedar Rapids' southwest side, were the Czech Village is located. Though not as intense as the rivalries with Jefferson and Linn-Mar, Prairie also holds a rivalry with Cedar Rapids Kennedy.

=== Notable Athletes and Championship History ===
Athlete	Sport	College	Professional Career
Keegan Murray	Basketball	University of Iowa	Sacramento Kings, 4th Overall Selection in 2022 NBA draft
Kris Murray	Basketball	University of Iowa	Portland Trail Blazers, 23rd Overall Selection in 2023 NBA draft
Scott Schebler	Baseball	DMACC, Wichita State University	Los Angeles Dodgers, Cincinnati Reds, Atlanta Braves, Los Angeles Angels
Levi Usher	Baseball	Kirkwood Community College, University of Louisville	Kansas City Royals, 10th round selection, 295th overall
Justin Wessel	Basketball	University of Arizona Wildcats	1996 Iowa Mr. Basketball, 1997 NCAA National Champion
Barry Davis	Wrestling	University of Iowa	Olympic Silver Medalist, 3x NCAA Champion, Head Coach: University of Wisconsin
Jim Zalesky	Wrestling	University of Iowa	3x NCAA Champion, Head Coach: University of Iowa, Oregon State University, University of Jamestown
Hannah Kousheh	Soccer	University of Iowa	Midfielder for the Jordan women's national team
Gabe Burkle	Football	Iowa State University, Pennsylvania State University	Tight End for the Iowa State Cyclones, Penn State Nittany Lions

Titles	Sport	Year
State Championships
4	Wrestling	State Tournament : 1979 (3A), 1995 (3A) State Team Duals : 1994 (3A), 1998 (3A)
2	Boys' Cross Country	2010 (4A), 2013 (4A)
1	Boys' Track and Field	2016 (4A)
1	Girls' Tennis	2016 (2A)
1	Baseball	2016 (4A)
1	Boys' Basketball	1998 (3A)
1	Football	1981 (3A)
11 Total State Championships

== Performing arts ==
=== Band ===
The Prairie High School Band program was started with the addition of music practice rooms in 1963. A Prairie High Marching Band was formed in 1967 with 67 members. The 9-12 grade bands have won many Division I Ratings at Iowa High School Music Association State Contest.

The band program is made up of several bands, including the Wind Ensemble, Symphonic Band, Concert Band, the Prairie "Hawks" Marching Band, Jazz Band One, Jazz Band Two, several Percussion Ensembles, and "The Art of Noiz!" Pep Band. A freshman concert band was introduced in the early 2000s, but was previously housed at the Prairie Point Middle School 2009–2023. Is now housed at the 9th Grade Center.

Students in Prairie band are selected to several honor bands annually, including the All-State Festival. The music department travels to a nationally adjudicated festival every three years. Past trips include performances in Anaheim, Orlando and the Bahamas.

=== Concert Choir ===
The choir program is directed by Justin Sands and Grace Huber. Many members from the Chamber Choir audition and are selected to the Iowa High School Music Association All-State Chorus every year. The choirs travel to a nationally adjudicated festival every three years, along with the bands. Unlike the bands, the choirs perform at state contest on an irregular basis The choir system at Prairie High School is divided up by three levels:

- Concert Choir, accessible to everyone, is less advanced and more focused on development of music skills.
- Concert Chorale, the next level up, is available by audition and the passing of a musical theory test.
- Chamber Choir is the highest level of choir at Prairie, is highly selective in choice, and requires audition also.

=== Show choir ===
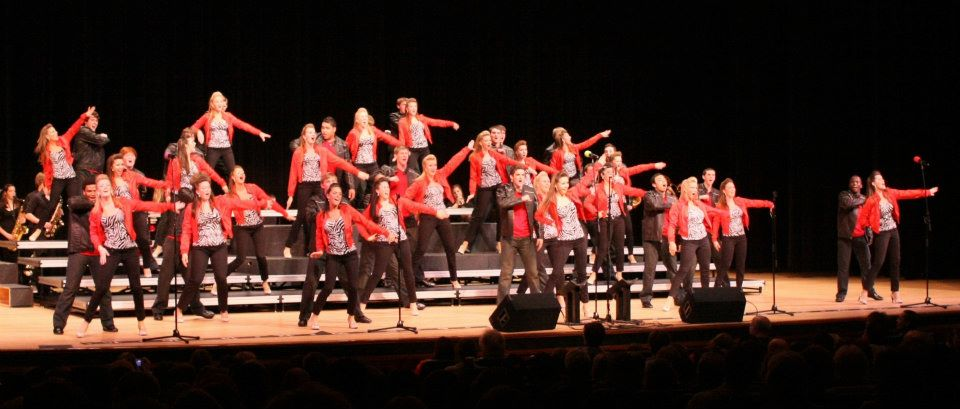
The 2011–2012 Ambassadors performing at Prairie's Concert Hall

Prairie High School show choir started in 1971 with the 76th Street Coalition Show Choir.

2011 marked the first time Prairie show choir was represented on a national level, with the Ambassadors qualifying for the Show Choir National Championship Series' FAME Chicago. There, they finished in third, winning the Best Technical Crew award and qualifying for the National Championships. In the 2012-13 season, Prairie hosted the inaugural Prairie Premiere show choir invitational. But the most notable event of the season would happen on January 12, when the Ambassadors upset national powers Resonance from Lincoln Southwest and Visual Adrenaline from Ankeny High School to win the Midwest Cup at the University of Nebraska–Lincoln.

In addition to the Ambassadors, Prairie is home to the prep show choir Focal Point. A short-lived women's show choir, Prairie Lights, performed in the mid-2000s, before being dropped as Prairie transitioned to a 10-12 school.

== Student life ==
Homecoming is celebrated with a parade through the Campus during the day, and during the football game there are fireworks shows, including buckets of gunpowder exploding as the team marches on to the field. One of the most popular traditions is the burning of a large 'P,' lit by the previous year's Homecoming Queen while the Prairie Alma Mater is playing.

The school has a popular podcast, called "The Hawks' Nest", which can be downloaded from the school's website. The school's student publication is called "The Hawk Talk".

=== List of student clubs ===
Some student clubs available at Prairie High School:

- Best Buddies
- Electric Car
- Key Club
- Science National Honor Society
- Book Club
- Chess Club
- Young Democrats

== Notable alumni and faculty ==
- Jeff Cooling – member of the Iowa House of Representatives
- Benny Johnson - political commentator
- Keegan Murray – professional basketball player for Sacramento Kings
- Kris Murray – professional basketball player for Portland Trail Blazers
- Hailey Whitters – Country Music, Grammy nominated singer/songwriter
- Scott Schebler - Major League Baseball player for the Los Angeles Dodgers, Cincinnati Reds, Atlanta Braves, and Los Angeles Angels
- Jim Zalesky - 3x NCAA Champion at University of Iowa, former head coach at Iowa, Oregon State, & the University of Jamestown
- Barry Davis - Olympic Silver Medalist & 3x NCAA Champion at Iowa, former head coach at Wisconsin
- Hannah Kousheh - professional soccer player for the Jordan women's national team
- Brent Metcalf - volunteer wrestling coach from August 2016 - November 2016
- Gabe Burkle - tight end for Penn State Nittany Lions

== Alternative program ==
Prairie has an alternative high school program located on Kirkwood Boulevard less than a mile from the high school campus. The Principal at Prairie Edge, Stephanie Van Hemert, with the help Jillian O'Rourke and Kindee Weldon, lead the students through a less-structured version of the regular high school. Opportunities are presented to "at-risk students" to make their high school experiences more enjoyable and present ways to graduate on time.

== See also ==
- List of high schools in Iowa
