= College Community School District =

School district near Cedar Rapids, Iowa, USA

Coordinates: 41.901507°N 91.662564°W

Location
- 401 76th Avenue SW, Cedar Rapids, IA Linn, Johnson, and Benton counties United States
- Coordinates: 41.901507, -91.662564

District information
- Type: Local School District (Public)
- Grades: Pre-K through 12
- Established: 1954
- Superintendent: Dr. Douglas Wheeler
- Schools: 7
- Budget: $94,636,000 (2020-21)
- NCES District ID: 1907860

Students and staff
- Students: 5740 (2022-23)
- Teachers: 371.13 FTE
- Staff: 523.97 FTE
- Student–teacher ratio: 15.47
- Athletic conference: Mississippi Valley
- District mascot: Hawks
- Colors: Orange and Black

Other information
- Website: www.crprairie.org

The College Community School District is a public school district serving communities of Linn, Johnson, and Benton counties in east central Iowa. The district was established in 1954 after the consolidation of several township schools. Based on a 381-acre (154 ha) campus in the southern part of Cedar Rapids, the district encompasses 137 square miles (350 km^{2}) including the communities of Walford, Fairfax, Swisher, Shueyville, Ely, Southwest Cedar Rapids, and surrounding areas.

== History ==
=== Establishment ===
The Iowa State Legislature started a series of laws beginning in 1947 to have the Iowa educational system reorganized. At this point in time, there were individual township school districts in existence. In the geographical area that later became the College Community School District, there were three townships involved in the discussion leading to reorganization: Fairfax, College and Putnam Townships. The Fairfax School housed primary through tenth grades, with eleventh and twelfth grades paying tuition to go to Cedar Rapids schools. College Township had 14 one-room school houses that housed primary through tenth grades. Those schools were going to consolidate into one College Township Elementary. Putnam Township had several schools, most notably Ely School.

In the early 1950s, the Cedar Rapids School District sent a notification to the school boards of the three townships and indicated that they would no longer accept students from its neighboring school districts for high school. They would be willing, however, to merge those township schools into the Cedar Rapids School District. An election was held in the spring of 1953 to create a new school district instead of merging into the Cedar Rapids District. Thus, in 1954, the College Community School District was established with 3 schools: Ely School in Putnam Township, College Township Elementary in College Township, and Fairfax School in Fairfax.

=== 1954–1979 ===
In 1954, the School Board along with the advice of several citizen committees, decided to purchase 40 acres of farmland and build a high school across the road from the current College Township Elementary and a few hundred yards west. This remains the site of the current Prairie High School. The elementary schools hosted grades K-7, the high school hosted grades 8-10 (later 8-12).

In 1958, 7th through 12th grade students from the Swisher Independent School District attended the College Community Schools for the first time on a tuition basis. Swisher and Jefferson Township (Present-day Shueyville) consolidated into College Community in 1960. Elementary students were taught Swisher and Shueyville schools for the time being.

In 1960, a bond issue passed to build a junior high school next to Prairie High School. Prairie Junior High School opened in 1961, housing grades seven through nine. Junior High Schools attended the first Outdoor Education Program at Camp Wapsie in 1962. This program continues in 2011, however, students now attend Outdoor Education week at Camp Io-dis-e-ca south of the district.

A bond issue was passed in the spring of 1961 and 25 acres of land east of the high school was purchased for the construction of a new elementary which opened as Prairie Intermediate in 1962. College Township Elementary is renamed Prairie Elementary.

Students from Walford started attending College Community Schools in the fall of 1966.

On November 18, 1969, a bond issue is passed, authorizing the construction of a new elementary next to Prairie Intermediate. Prairie View opened in 1972, and schools in Swisher, Shueyville, Ely, and Farifax closed, making all schools in the district based on a central campus. In August 1977, the District gave the old College Township Hall to Usher’s Ferry. That building, as well as the old Fairfax Township Cherry Valley country school building, exists at Ushers Ferry today.

In 1975, elementary grades were reconfigured, making Prairie Elementary and Prairie View K-3 schools, and Prairie Intermediate a 4-6 school. The Junior High remained 7-9, and Prairie High School remained 10-12.

=== 1980–1999 ===
In February 1981, the College Community Schools Foundation was established. It was the first foundation established in Iowa to support a public school district. The name was later changed to “Prairie School Foundation.”

In 1989, freshman leave the Junior High for Prairie High School, and the junior high is renamed Prairie Middle School.

In 1993, grade levels are reconfigured again. Prairie Elementary, Prairie Intermediate, and Prairie View house grades K-5, and Prairie Middle School houses grades 6-8. Prairie Elementary is renamed Prairie Heights, and Prairie Intermediate is renamed Prairie Crest.

Prairie Oaks, is added at Four Oaks campus on Kirkwood Blvd. in 1996. The name was later changed to Prairie Edge.

=== 2000–present ===
A bond issue was passed on March 13, 2001, to build a new elementary and for additions to be made at Prairie Heights and Prairie View elementary buildings. In the fall of 2003, Prairie Ridge opened.

The largest grade reorganization in district history occurs before the 2009-10 school year. All four elementary schools now house grades PK-4, Prairie Middle School becomes Prairie Creek Intermediate and houses grades five and six, the new Prairie Point Middle School & Ninth Grade Academy houses grades 7-9, and the High School houses grades 10-12. Staggered school start times were initiated to accommodate transportation needs with Prairie Creek Intermediate and Prairie Point Middle School & 9th Grade Academy starting classes at 8:00 am and Prairie Crest, Heights, Ridge and View Elementary buildings and Prairie High School starting classes at 9:00 am.

John Wall Field was heavily renovated in the summer of 2011 in preparation for the 2011-12 school year. Improvements include a new storage building and ticket booth behind the north end zone, a new entrance area for the home stands, expanded seating on the home bleachers, brand new bleachers for visiting team fans, and a new Field Turf playing surface, designed for both football and soccer.

On April 3, 2012, a bond issue passed, authorizing the building of a fifth elementary to be placed on the old youth baseball complex. A new baseball complex is being built on the far south edge of campus. In late January, the School Board approved the proposed design of the new elementary by OPN Architects. The design is similar to that of Prairie Ridge Elementary. Shortly thereafter, a contest to name the school began. On March 11, 2013, the school board approved naming the new building Prairie Hill Elementary.

It was announced on April 11, 2012, that students will be issued a district-owned computer, starting the 2012-13 school year. All students in grades 9-12 are provided with 11-inch MacBook Air laptops, to use at school and at home.

On January 31, 2013, district superintendent John Speer told media that Prairie High School Principal Mark Gronemeyer was going to resign from his position, effective immediately. Gronemeyer was subsequently reassigned to a newly created job in the district office for the remainder of the year, given the title of Secondary Curriculum Specialist. Both resignations and the reassignment were approved on February 1. Many in the community began to wonder why the district would unexpectedly reassign the principal in the middle of the term to a newly created position, knowing he would resign at the end of the year, and rumors began that an incident occurred that forced the school board to remove him from Prairie High School. Speer said he could not directly comment on the suspicious nature of the situation. Associate Principal Erik Anderson was named Principal on an interim basis on February 1.

=== Future ===
In 2004, a Citizen's Advisory Committee on School Facilities was formed to determine the district's future. Phase 1 of the plan was to open the new Concert Hall at College community, and to reorganize grade levels with the opening of Prairie Point. Phase 2 is to build Prairie Hill Elementary and open the new baseball complex. Phase 3 of the plan was to expand Prairie High School by building more classrooms and lockers, demolishing the music 'Circle' and building new rehearsal rooms, building new office space where the circle was, and converting the old office into classroom space. However, a new Advisory committee will be established in the fall to determine a new long-term plan, putting the 2004 committee's phase 3 in jeopardy.

== Schools ==
=== Prairie High School ===
Prairie High School opened in 1956. Originally holding grades 8-10, it has gone from being a 10-12 school to a 9-12 school to currently being a 10-12 school again. The high school is home to the Concert Hall at College Community and the College Community Theatre, as well as offices for the school board. Construction has occurred in 1957, 1963, 1989, 1990, 2000, 2001, and 2006.

=== Prairie Point Middle School & Ninth Grade Academy ===
Prairie Point opened in 2009, housing grades 7-8. Many traditions from the old middle school (7th grade outdoor education week, 8th grade Washington, D.C. trip) have been continued on to the new building.

=== Prairie Creek Intermediate ===
Prairie Creek opened in 1961 as Prairie Junior High, housing grades 7-9. In 1989, the building became Prairie Middle School, housing grades seven and eight until sixth graders joined in 1993. In 2009, the building became Prairie Creek Intermediate, hosting grades five and six. Construction has occurred in this building in 1962, 1987, 1998, and during the 2022 - 2023 school year. A new building was being built, as the old building was being reconstructed to a 9th grade academy.

=== Prairie Heights Elementary ===
Opening in 1954 as College Township Elementary, Prairie Heights is the oldest active building in the district. College Township Elementary was renamed Prairie Elementary in 1962, then Prairie Heights Elementary in 1993. A famous wooden playground was built in four days in 1988 by volunteers, students and parents. This playground was worn out and replaced in the summer of 2010, much to the chagrin of students and alumni. Construction occurred here in 1961, 1995, and 2002.

=== Prairie Crest Elementary ===
Opening as Prairie Intermediate in 1962, the school hosted grades 4-6 until 1993, when it held grades K-5 and was renamed Prairie Crest. The school currently hosts grades PK-4. Construction occurred here in 1965, 1969, 1997, and 2022.

=== Prairie View Elementary ===
Opening in 1972, Prairie View originally hosted grades K-3. From 1993 to 2009, the school hosted grades K-5. The school currently hosts grades PK-4. Construction occurred in 1995 and 2002.

=== Prairie Ridge Elementary ===
Opening in 2003, Ridge housed grades K-5 until 2009, when the school became a PK-4 school.

=== Prairie Hill Elementary ===
On April 3, 2012, a bond issue passed, authorizing the building of a fifth elementary to be placed on the old youth baseball complex. In late January, the School Board approved the proposed design of the new elementary by OPN Architects. The design is similar to that of Prairie Ridge Elementary. Shortly thereafter, a contest to name the school began. On March 11, 2013, the school board approved the new school to be named Prairie Hill Elementary, after it overwhelmingly won a student vote, earning 737 votes compared to the 388 votes garnered by the second most popular name, Prairie Peak. Other finalists included Summit, Grove, and Fields. Prairie Hill houses grades PK-4, and opened in time for the 2014-2015 school year.
