= John Knowles (American politician) =

American politician

Member of New Hampshire House of Representatives for Hillsborough 27
- In office 2006–2010

Personal details
- Party: Democratic

John Knowles is an American politician. He was a member of the New Hampshire House of Representatives and represented Hillsborough's 27th district.

Knowles endorsed the Cory Booker 2020 presidential campaign.
