= Hannah Kousheh =

Jordanian footballer

Personal information
- Full name: Hannah Ibrahim Deifallah Al-Kousheh
- Date of birth: 21 January 1997 (age 29)
- Place of birth: Cedar Rapids, Iowa, U.S.
- Height: 1.63 m (5 ft 4 in)
- Position: Midfielder

Youth career
- Prairie High School

College career
Years	Team	Apps	(Gls)
2015	Iowa Hawkeyes		

Senior career*
Years	Team	Apps	(Gls)
- PSC Iowa

International career^{‡}
2017–2018	Jordan	12	(2)
- * Club domestic league appearances and goals ‡ National team caps and goals as of 12 April 2018

Hannah Ibrahim Deifallah Al-Kousheh (born 21 January 1997), known as Hannah Kousheh (Arabic: هناء الكوشة), is an American-born Jordanian footballer who plays as a midfielder. She has been a member of the Jordan women's national team.

== Early life ==
Kousheh hails from Cedar Rapids, Iowa.

== International goals ==
No.	Date	Venue	Opponent	Score	Result	Competition
1.	2 February 2018	Petra Stadium, Amman, Jordan	Afghanistan	2–0	5–0	Friendly
