= Amy Nielsen =

Member of the Iowa House of Representatives

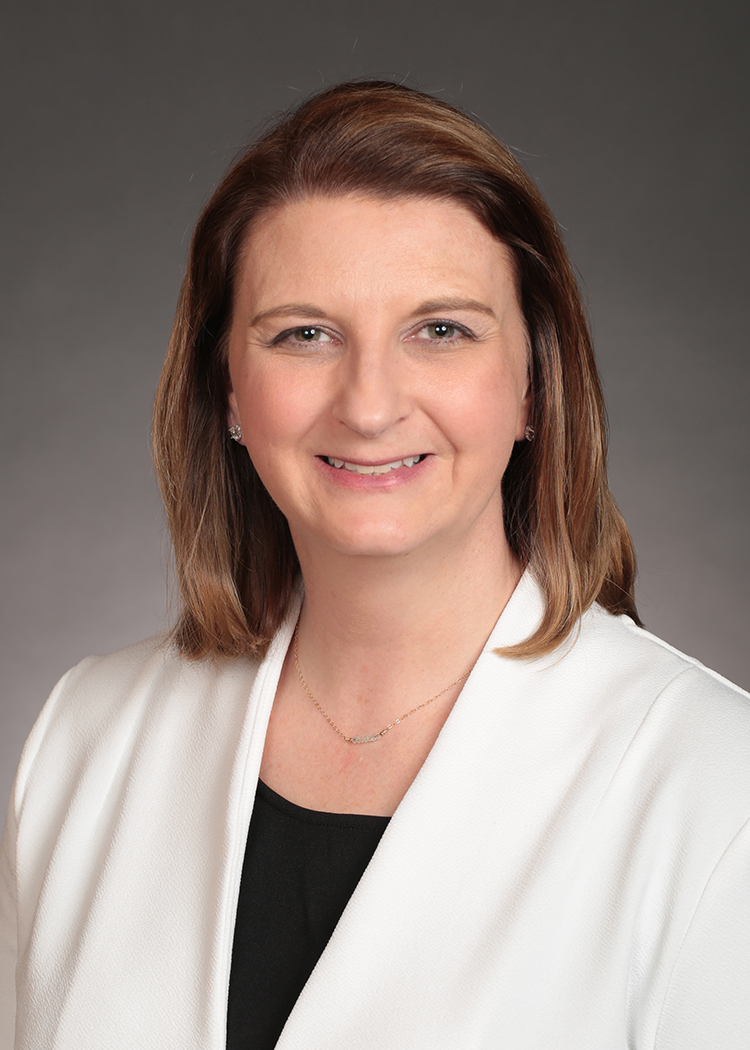

Member of the Iowa House of Representatives from the 85th district
- Incumbent
- Assumed office January 9, 2017
- Preceded by: Sally Stutsman

Mayor of North Liberty
- In office November 4, 2014 – December 31, 2016
- Preceded by: Gerry Kuhl
- Succeeded by: Terry Donahue

Personal details
- Born: 1977 (age 48–49) Keokuk, Iowa, U.S.
- Party: Democratic
- Education: Kirkwood Community College
- Website: http://www.amyforiowa.com/

Amy Nielsen is a Democratic member of the Iowa House of Representatives. She has represented the 85th district, which encompasses the cities of North Liberty, Tiffin, Oxford, Swisher, Shueyville, and Lone Tree as well as rural areas surrounding Iowa City to the west and south, since January 2017. Prior to her election to the House, she was Mayor of North Liberty from November 2014 to December 2016.

== Early life, education, and career ==
Nielsen was born in Keokuk, Iowa, in 1978. Due to her father's job in the auto industry, the family moved to Tennessee for a brief time before relocating back to the Iowan community of Hills outside of Iowa City, where both of her parents ended up working for local banks. She attended Iowa City West High School, graduating in 1995. After two years at Kirkwood Community College, she and her husband left Iowa and began to move around the country for his job at Kimberly Clark.

Now a stay-at-home mother of three children, she and her family made it back to Iowa, settling down in North Liberty. There, she began serving on the PTO of her children's school and worked on a revenue purpose campaign with the Iowa City School District. Nielsen also sat on the board of directors for the North Liberty Community Pantry and served as member of the Iowa City Community School District's Equity Advisory Committee.

This experience motivated her to apply for a city council seat that had opened up upon the passing of North Liberty's mayor. Although she wasn't selected, she decided to run for mayor the following year. Despite her relative inexperience and her opponent's stellar record of 15 years public service, Nielsen won with 55% of the vote.

== State House Career ==
After Sally Stutsman announced that she would not seek reelection in 2015, House leadership reached out to Nielsen, who initially declined. However, after reconsideration, she ultimately agreed and decided to launch a campaign around school funding. She defeated former Tiffin Mayor, Royce Phillips, for a seat in the 77th District. After redistricting, Nielsen was elected to the 85th District in 2022 and reelected in 2024.

=== 2025-2027 Committee assignments ===
- State Government (ranking member)
- Appropriations
- Local Government
- Natural Resources
- Administrative Rules Review Committee
- State Government Efficiency Review Committee

== Electoral history ==
Election	Political result	Candidate	Party	Votes	%
North Liberty's mayoral election, 2014	win	Amy Nielsen		2,609	55.11
North Liberty's mayoral election, 2014	win	Gerry Kuhl		2,125	44.89
Iowa's 77th District primary election, 2016	Democratic win	Amy Nielsen	Democratic	667	63.46
Iowa's 77th District primary election, 2016	Democratic win	Abbie Weipert	Democratic	384	36.54
Iowa's 77th District election, 2016	Democratic hold	Amy Nielsen	Democratic	10,217	57.79
Iowa's 77th District election, 2016	Democratic hold	Royce Phillips	Republican	7,461	42.21

== Political endorsement ==
She recorded a video in support of Cory 2020,

When he was mayor of Newark, Cory was able to bring people together to accomplish things ... As a former mayor myself, I know the types of tough decisions that you must make when you are the city's Chief Executive Officer, and how that prepares you to tackle big things in the future ...

Iowa House of Representatives
Preceded by Christina Bohannan	85th District; 2023-Present	Succeeded by Incumbent
Preceded by Sally Stutsman	77th District; 2017 – 2023	Succeeded by Jeff Cooling
