= Bill Conlin (politician) =

American politician

Member of the New Hampshire House of Representatives from the Strafford 15th district
- In office December 7, 2022 – December 4, 2024
- Preceded by: Ariel Oxaal
- Succeeded by: Alice Wade

Personal details
- Party: Democratic
- Education: University of Massachusetts, Amherst (BS)

Bill Conlin is an American politician. He served as a Democratic member for the Strafford 15th district of the New Hampshire House of Representatives for one term, from 2022 to 2024.
