= Jeff Cooling =

American politician (born 1987)

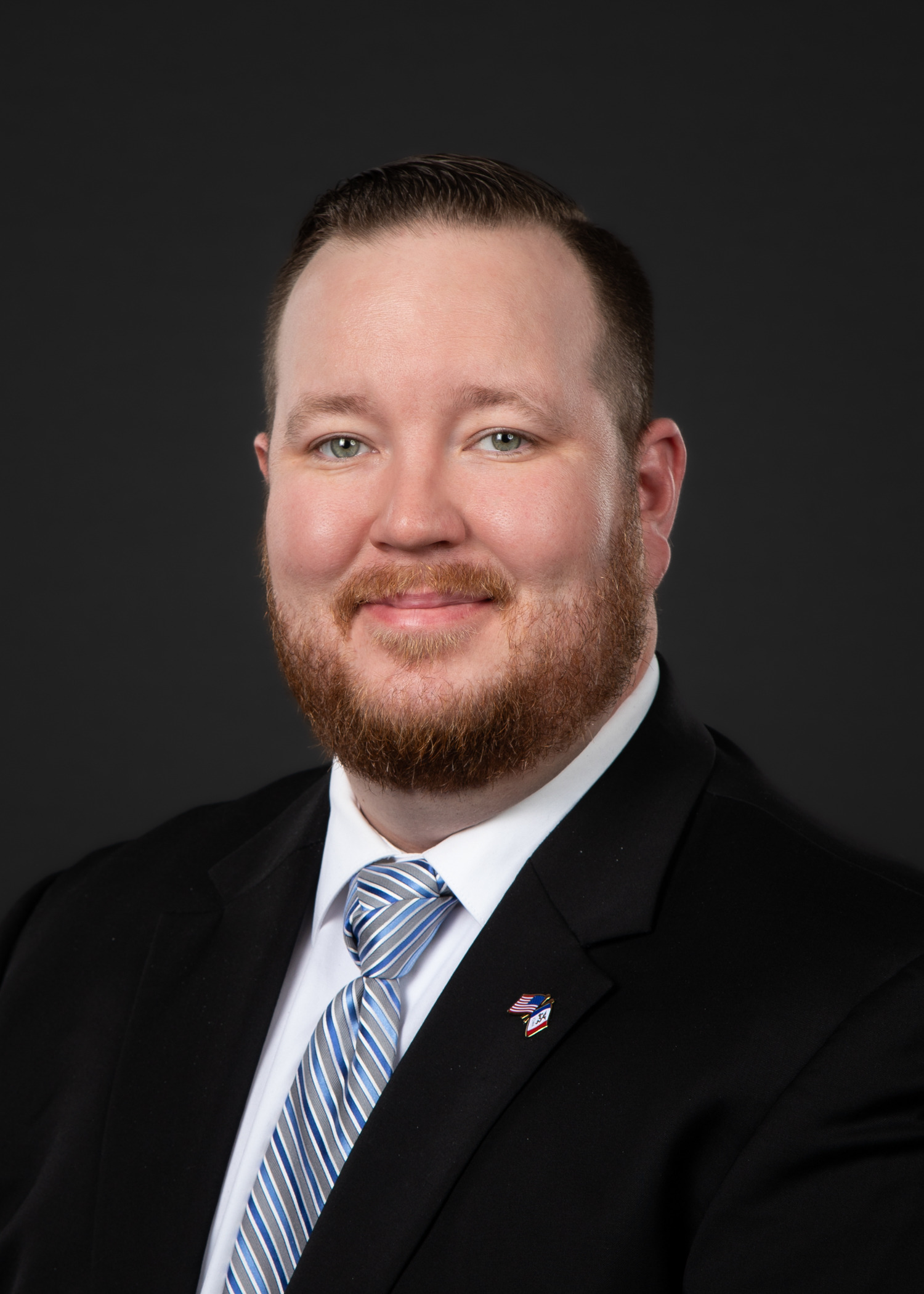

Member of the Iowa House of Representatives from the 77th district
- Incumbent
- Assumed office January 9, 2023
- Preceded by: Amy Nielsen (redistricting)

Personal details
- Born: 1987 (age 38–39) Cedar Rapids, Iowa, U.S.
- Party: Democratic
- Spouse: Amanda
- Children: 2
- Education: IBEW apprenticeship
- Occupation: Electrician

Jeff Cooling (born 1987) is an American politician and electrician who has represented the 77th district of the Iowa House of Representatives since January 2023, which consists of parts of southern Linn County, including parts of southern Cedar Rapids. He is a member of the Democratic Party.

== Early life ==
Cooling was born in 1987 in Cedar Rapids, Iowa, and was raised in Shueyville, Iowa. He graduated from Prairie High School in 2006 and completed his apprenticeship through IBEW Local 405.

== Political career ==
Following decennial redistricting in 2021, Cooling announced his candidacy for the open 77th district seat of the Iowa House of Representatives in early 2022. He won the Democratic primaries unopposed on June 7, 2022, and won the general election on November 8 unopposed with over 95 percent of the vote.

In 2024, Cooling filed to run for reelection. He won the Democratic primaries unopposed on June 4, 2024, and will again run unopposed in the general election on November 5, 2024.

Cooling currently serves on the Local Government, State Government, Transportation, and Labor and Workforce committees, the lattermost of which he is the ranking member.

Cooling has said that his priorities include workers' rights, childcare and education.

== Personal life ==
Cooling has a wife, Amanda, and two children. He resides in Cedar Rapids. He is the president of IBEW Local 405 and vice president of the Hawkeye Area Labor Council.

== Electoral history ==
Election	Political result	Candidate	Party	Votes	%
Iowa House of Representatives Democratic primary elections, 2022; District 77; Turnout: 1,612	Democratic (newly redistricted)	Jeff Cooling	Democratic	1,609	99.8
Iowa House of Representatives Democratic primary elections, 2022; District 77; Turnout: 1,612	Democratic (newly redistricted)	Other/Write-in votes		3	0.2
Iowa House of Representatives general elections, 2022; District 77; Turnout: 7,298	Democratic (newly redistricted)	Jeff Cooling	Democratic	6,951	95.2
Iowa House of Representatives general elections, 2022; District 77; Turnout: 7,298	Democratic (newly redistricted)	Other/Write-in votes		347	4.8
