= Samuel Chouinard (politician) =

American politician

Member-elect of the New Hampshire House of Representatives from the Strafford 15th district
- Assuming office December 2026
- Succeeding: Alice Wade

Personal details
- Party: Democratic

Samuel Chouinard is an American politician. A member of the Democratic Party, he is the member-elect for the Strafford 15th district of the New Hampshire House of Representatives.
