= Alice Wade =

American politician

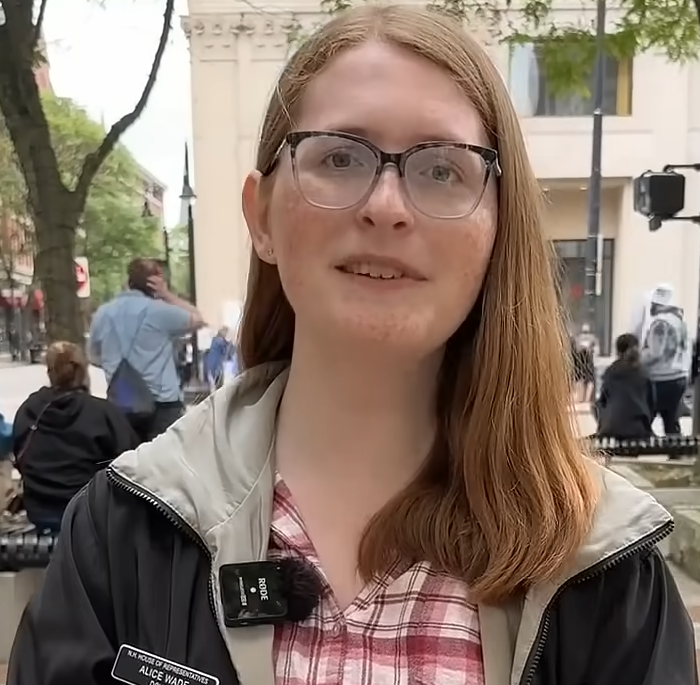

Member of the New Hampshire House of Representatives from the Strafford 15th district
- Incumbent
- Assumed office December 4, 2024
- Preceded by: Bill Conlin
- Succeeded by: Samuel Chouinard (elect)

Personal details
- Born: 2001 or 2002 (age 24–25)
- Party: Democratic
- Education: University of New Hampshire (BS)
- Website: Official website

Alice Wade (born 2001/2002) is an American aerospace engineer and politician serving as a member for the Strafford 15th district of the New Hampshire House of Representatives. A Democrat, she is openly transgender.

When elected in 2024, Wade became one of the few members of Generation Z serving within the New Hampshire House of Representatives.

== Career ==
Wade was elected to the New Hampshire House of Representatives in 2024.

In June 2025, Wade opened an exploratory committee to run for the 2026 U.S. House of Representatives election in New Hampshire's 1st congressional district, where incumbent Democrat Chris Pappas is retiring to run in the concurrent U.S. Senate election.

== See also ==
- List of transgender public officeholders in the United States
