= Matthew Klapper =

American attorney

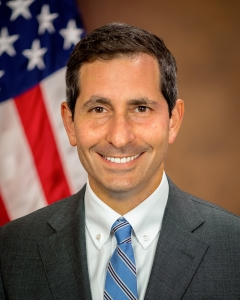

Personal details
- Education: University of Pennsylvania (BA); Yale University (JD)

Matthew Bennett Klapper (Born December 16) is an American attorney who served as Chief of Staff and Senior Counselor to the Attorney General at the United States Department of Justice. He is among the longest-serving chiefs of staff in the history of the department.

Klapper previously served on the Biden-Harris Transition Team as the "navigator" for the attorney general nominee and met Attorney General Merrick Garland through that work. He has also served in various roles under United States Senator Cory Booker, including as his long-time chief of staff and his 2020 presidential campaign senior advisor. Klapper served for over a decade as a firefighter and emergency medical technician, including over three years in a full-time capacity, and several more as a volunteer. He received recognition for returning to service as an EMT in one of New Jersey's hardest hit counties at the height of COVID-19 when Governor Phil Murphy called upon retired medical and emergency services personnel to return to duty to fill severe staffing shortfalls.

== Early life and education ==
Born in Brooklyn to parents Carlton Barry and Joanne Susan (Klein), Klapper attended Saint Ann's School for elementary school. He and his family moved to Summit, New Jersey in 1993. As a student at the Pingry School, Klapper made a number of films and was recognized at the New York National High School Film Festival as the most entertaining film in 1999 and as best of festival in 2001.

He earned a Bachelor of Arts from the University of Pennsylvania and a Juris Doctor degree from Yale Law School.

Klapper is Jewish. He met his wife, Victoria, in 2013 through JDate, after his platoon at his firehouse signed him up as a Hanukkah gift.

== DOJ Chief of Staff ==
Klapper was appointed as Chief of Staff on January 20, 2021, under Acting Attorney General Robert "Monty" Wilkinson, and led the Senate confirmation process for Attorney General Merrick Garland before becoming his chief of staff. The appointment of Klapper received widespread praise with press accounts describing him as a "gregarious personality with credibility across the aisle." Jonathan Martin, Politico's politics bureau chief and senior political columnist stated Klapper was "a highly respected" Senate Chief of Staff. In addition, Senator Cory Booker noted that Klapper has "a fierce view of the need for justice in this world" and went on to call him "Jiminy Cricket" and "one of these rare people that lives with such a high frequency of integrity."

Klapper was subsequently promoted to Chief of Staff and Counselor to the Attorney General in June 2022, and to Chief of Staff and Senior Counselor to the Attorney General in March 2024.

Klapper supervised the work of the Attorney General's office, led priority initiatives for the Attorney General, assisted in the management of the Department's 115,000-strong workforce, participated in a wide range of the Department's civil, criminal, and national security matters, and provided advice on legal, policy, legislative, communications, and operational issues to his colleagues on the department's senior leadership team.

== Senator Cory Booker ==
Prior to his service at the Department of Justice, Klapper most recently served for over six years as chief of staff to United States Senator Cory Booker. Klapper began his work for Booker in high school when, as an aspiring civil rights documentarian, Booker saw a documentary film that Klapper had made about Martin Luther King Jr. and went on to hire him. Klapper made a campaign film for Booker when he was the Central Ward Councilman in Newark, New Jersey. Klapper went on to serve on several of Booker's campaigns, including on two of his mayoral races, as policy director on his 2013 Senate campaign, on two subsequent senate reelection campaigns, and as the Senior Advisor for his unsuccessful 2020 presidential campaign. Klapper led preparation for Booker's debates in the 2020 presidential primary campaign. In addition to serving as Booker's Senate chief of staff, Klapper served in other official roles under Booker, including as his lead staffer for Judiciary Committee issues, as the Chief Policy Advisor for the City of Newark, and as the policy advisor responsible for public safety policy for the City of Newark.

== Emergency services ==
Klapper served for over a decade as a firefighter and emergency medical technician, including for over three years as a full-time firefighter in Summit, New Jersey, and as a volunteer with an ambulance squad in nearby Springfield Township.
