= Linn Opderbecke =

American politician

Member of the New Hampshire House of Representatives from the Strafford 15 district
- In office 2016 – December 2, 2020
- Succeeded by: Ariel Oxaal

Personal details
- Party: Democratic
- Education: St. Olaf College (BA)

Linn Opderbecke is a New Hampshire politician.

== Education ==
Opderbecke earned a B.A. in social psychology from St. Olaf College.

== Career ==
Opderbecke is a retired Lutheran pastor. On November 8, 2016, Opderbecke was elected to the New Hampshire House of Representatives where he represented the Strafford 15 district until December 2, 2020. Opderbecke is a Democrat.

== Personal life ==
Opderbecke resides in Dover, New Hampshire. Opderbecke is married and has two children.
