= Sally Stutsman =

American politician (born 1946)

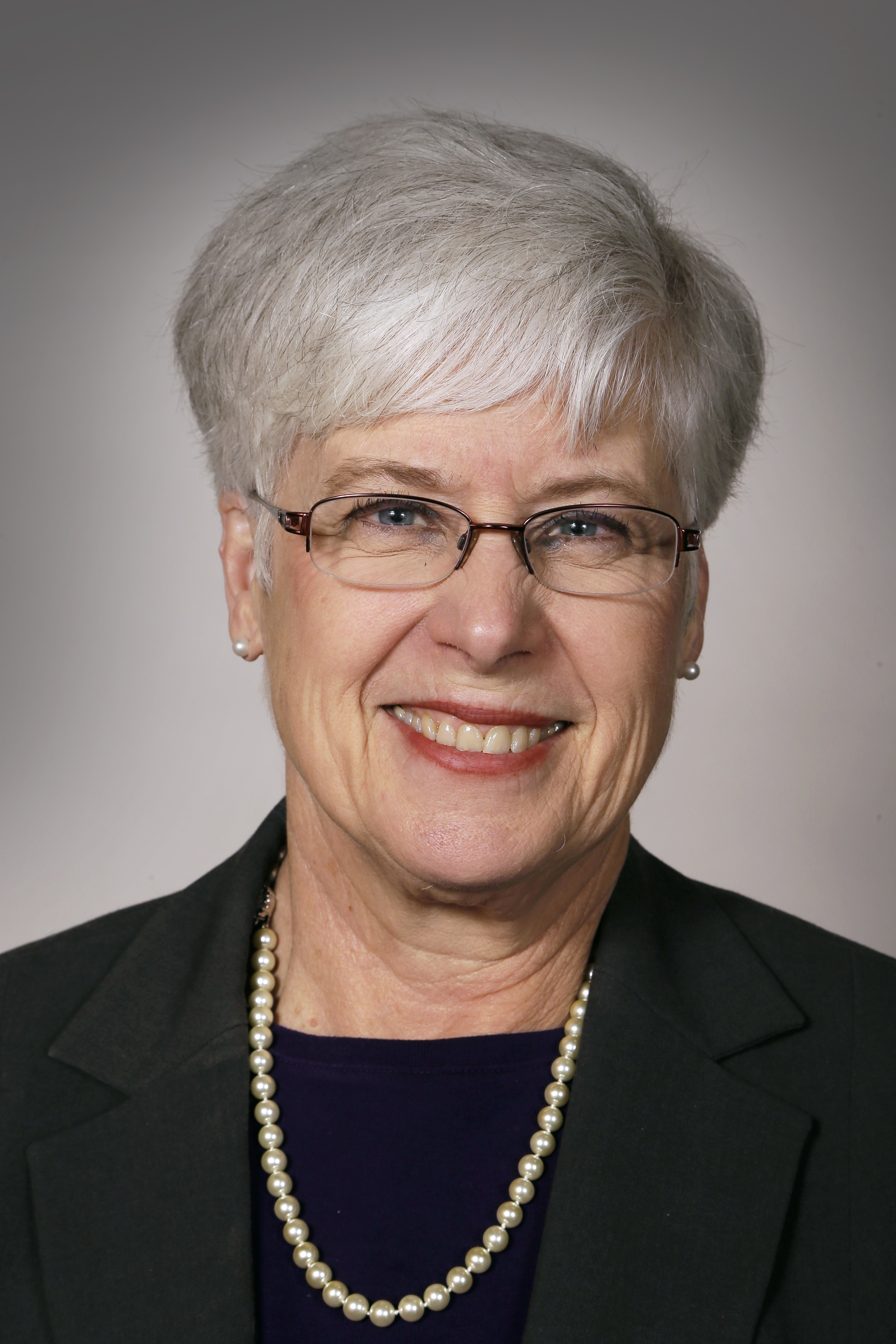

Member of the Iowa House of Representatives from the 77th district
- In office January 14, 2013 – 2017
- Succeeded by: Amy Nielsen

Personal details
- Born: November 26, 1946 (age 79) Fort Dodge, Iowa, U.S.
- Party: Democratic
- Spouse: Roger Stutsman
- Children: one

Sally Stutsman (née Jackowell; November 27, 1946) was the Iowa State Representative from the 77th District. A Democrat, she has served in the Iowa House of Representatives since 2013.
