= Ariel Oxaal =

American politician

Member of the New Hampshire House of Representatives
- In office December 2, 2020 – December 7, 2022
- Preceded by: Linn Opderbecke
- Succeeded by: Bill Conlin
- Constituency: Strafford 15

Personal details
- Born: Glendale, California
- Party: Democratic

Ariel Oxaal is an American politician from New Hampshire. She served in the New Hampshire House of Representatives.
