= Jerry Crawford (lawyer) =

American lawyer

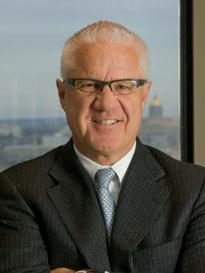

Jerry Crawford (born October 26, 1949) is a United States lawyer and leader in the Democratic Party from Des Moines, Iowa. Crawford has also worked for the Democratic Party as fundraiser and lobbyist. Crawford has helped every Democratic presidential nominee succeed in the Iowa Caucus. He had been working for Hillary Clinton's 2016 presidential campaign in Iowa since 2014.

== Early life and education ==
Crawford was born into a family involved in Iowa politics, growing up on a farm in Warren County, Iowa. sharing his grandfather's love of horses. According to the bio on his webpage he attended Macalester College, graduating with a B.A. in Political Science in 1971, then the University of Iowa College of Law, earning his J.D. degree in 1975, after which he was admitted to the Iowa Bar.

== Career ==
Crawford established Crawford & Mauro Law Firm in Des Moines Iowa, and specializes in civil litigation, personal injury, sports law, racing and gaming. In 1976, he won the chairmanship of the Polk County Democrats "in a landslide". He became a "state Democratic power player, a strategist and tactician".

Since 1980, Crawford has worked for the Democratic Party as fundraiser and lobbyist. He has helped every Democratic presidential nominee succeed in the Iowa Caucus, including John Kerry, Al Gore, Bill Clinton twice, Michael Dukakis and Hillary Clinton in 2016. During Hillary Clinton's 2008 presidential bid he co-chaired her Midwest campaign.

Since at least 2014, he had been working for Hillary Clinton's 2016 presidential campaign in Iowa.

Crawford's work as a lobbyist for Monsanto has been discussed in connection with his work with Clinton's campaign and issues of lobbyist influence on elections.

== Personal life and business activities ==
In 2007, Crawford founded the Iowa Energy basketball team, which he has owned through Iowa Basketball, LLC since. In 2011, the Iowa Energy won the NBDL Championship.

In 2008 he founded Donegal Racing, a company that owns thoroughbred racehorses, some of which have participated in the Kentucky Derby. In 2015, Donegal horse Keen Ice defeated triple crown winner American Pharoah in the Travers Stakes.

In 2014, Crawford invested in a little known play called, "A Gentleman's Guide to Love and Murder" which went on to win a Tony Award for "Best Musical". In 2016 Crawford served as Chairman of the Board of Trustees for Macalester College.
