= Addisu Demissie =

American political strategist

- Born: Canada
- Education: Yale University (BA, JD)
- Years active: 2001-present
- Political party: Democratic

Addisu Demissie is an American Democratic Party political strategist. He managed Rahm Emanuel's 2011 Chicago mayoral campaign, David Chiu's 2011 San Francisco mayoral campaign, Cory Booker's 2013 U.S. Senate campaign, Gavin Newsom's 2018 California gubernatorial campaign, and Cory Booker's 2020 presidential campaign. He also worked on the 2008 presidential campaigns of Hillary Clinton and Barack Obama, Clinton's 2016 presidential campaign, and John Kerry's 2004 presidential campaign. He worked for Organizing for America. He also founded 50+1 Strategies.

== Early life and education ==
Born in Canada, Demissie immigrated to the United States.

Demissie received a bachelor degree in political science from Yale University in 2001, and a Juris Doctor from Yale Law School in 2008.

== Career ==
Before attending law school, Demissie started his political career working on John Kerry's 2004 presidential campaign. He both worked in Iowa and served as its Georgia field director at points in the campaign. During the 2008 United States presidential election, Demissie first worked on Hillary Clinton's campaign in the Democratic primaries. Clinton would lose the primaries to Barack Obama. During the general election, he worked as the Ohio get out the vote director for Obama's campaign, holding that position from August 2008 through the November election.

In 2009, Demissie was named as a political director for the Organizing for America community organizing project of the Democratic National Committee.

From May 2010, he became a policy counsel at Google. He left Google in October 2010 to work as the field director of Rahm Emanuel's successful campaign in the 2011 Chicago mayoral election, holding that position through the election day in February 2011. In 2011 and 2012, he worked for a number of campaigns in California. This included David Chiu's unsuccessful campaign in the 2011 San Francisco mayoral election. He also co-founded 50+1 Strategies, a consulting firm based in California.

In 2013, Demissie served as the campaign manager of Cory Booker's successful campaign in the 2013 United States Senate special election in New Jersey.

In February 2014, he became vice president and director of grassroots advocacy of The Messina Group, a position he would hold until February 2017.

During the 2016 United States presidential election, Demissie served as the national voter outreach and mobilization director of Hillary Clinton's presidential campaign.

Demissie served as campaign manager of Gavin Newsom's successful campaign in the 2018 California gubernatorial election. He held this position from September 2017 through the election in November 2018.

In 2019, he began working in the position of principal consultant at his firm 50+1 Strategies.

In 2019, Demissie became the campaign manager of Cory Booker's ultimately unsuccessful 2020 presidential campaign. After Joe Biden became the presumptive nominee for the Democratic Party, in June 2020, Biden named Demissie to be a senior advisor involved in coordinating the 2020 Democratic National Convention.

In February 2021, Demissie and a number of other Democratic strategist launched the group Building Back Together, planning to run ads promoting the agenda of the Biden administration.

In 2023, Demissie was selected as a Fellow at the USC Center for the Political Future .
