= Shueyville, Iowa =

- City
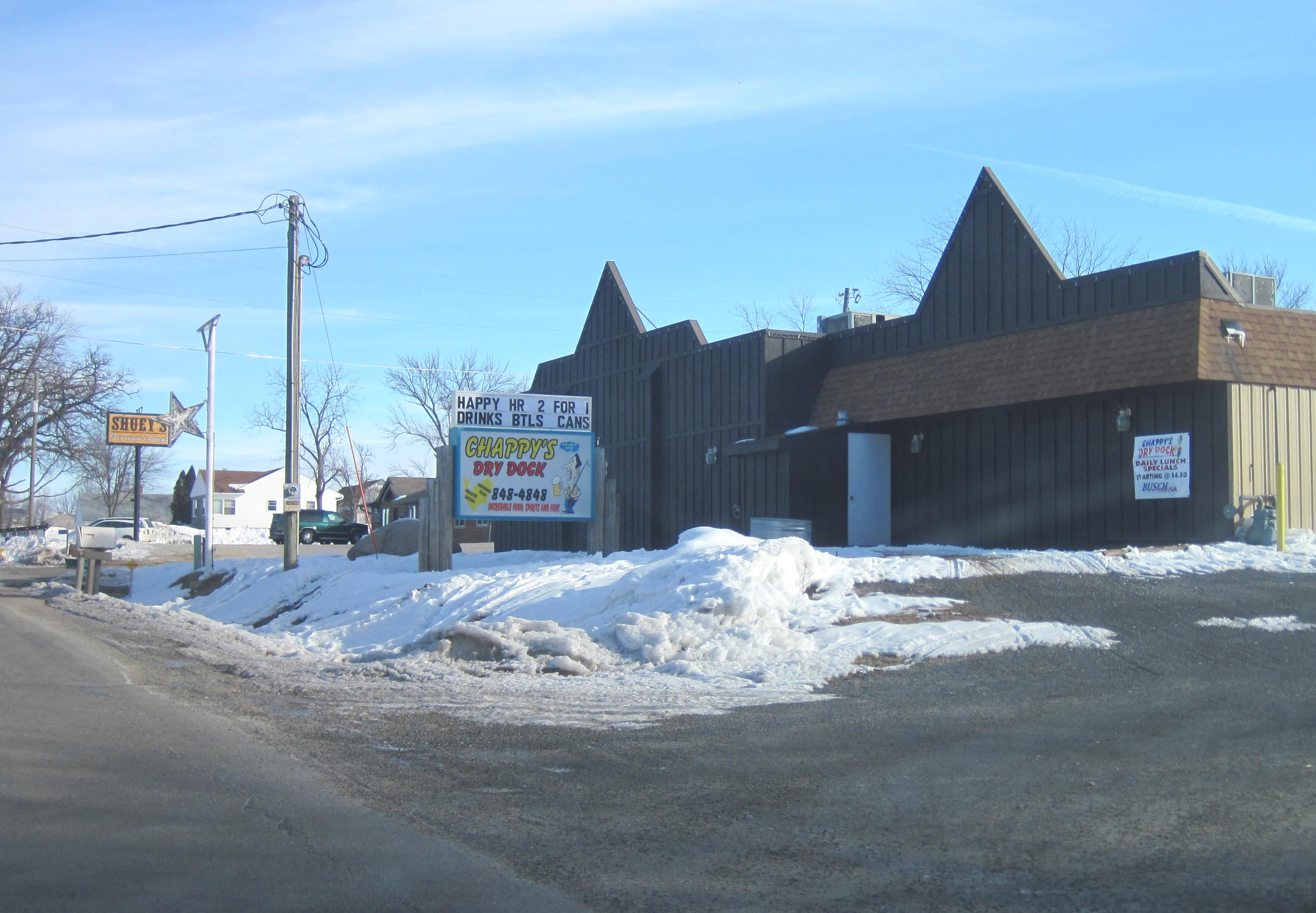
- Buildings on Club Road Northeast in downtown Shueyville in February 2010

- Location of Shueyville, Iowa
- Coordinates: 41°50′47″N 91°39′04″W
- Country: United States
- State: Iowa
- County: Johnson
- Incorporated: March 8, 1968

Government
  - Type: Mayor - council
  - Mayor: Chase Lang

Area
  - Total: 1.86 sq mi (4.83 km^{2})
  - Land: 1.86 sq mi (4.83 km^{2})
  - Water: 0 sq mi (0.00 km^{2})
- Elevation: 833 ft (254 m)

Population (2020)
  - Total: 731
  - Density: 392.3/sq mi (151.45/km^{2})
- Time zone: UTC-6 (Central (CST))
  - Summer (DST): UTC-5 (CDT)
- FIPS code: 19-72840
- GNIS feature ID: 2395879

Shueyville is a city in Johnson County, Iowa, United States. It is part of the Iowa City, Iowa Metropolitan Statistical Area. The population was 731 at the time of the 2020 census.

== History ==
Shueyville was founded in 1855 by Jacob Shuey, who emigrated from Augusta County, Virginia. The initial population of the town was Shuey and his extended family. Shuey also donated the land on which was built Western College, which later became Leander Clark College.

== Geography ==
According to the United States Census Bureau, the city has a total area of 1.79 square miles (4.64 km^{2}), all land.

== Demographics ==
Historical populations
Year	Pop.	±%
1880	108	—
1890	115	+6.5%
1900	136	+18.3%
1910	142	+4.4%
1920	132	−7.0%
1930	127	−3.8%
1940	115	−9.4%
1950	127	+10.4%
1960	132	+3.9%
1970	154	+16.7%
1980	287	+86.4%
1990	223	−22.3%
2000	250	+12.1%
2010	577	+130.8%
2020	731	+26.7%
Source:"U.S. Census website". United States Census Bureau. and Iowa Data Center; Source: U.S. Decennial Census

=== 2020 census ===
As of the census of 2020, there were 731 people, 244 households, and 214 families residing in the city. The population density was 390.9 inhabitants per square mile (150.9/km^{2}). There were 258 housing units at an average density of 138.0 per square mile (53.3/km^{2}). The racial makeup of the city was 94.3% White, 0.4% Black or African American, 0.3% Native American, 2.5% Asian, 0.0% Pacific Islander, 0.3% from other races and 2.3% from two or more races. Hispanic or Latino persons of any race comprised 0.7% of the population.

Of the 244 households, 44.7% of which had children under the age of 18 living with them, 79.1% were married couples living together, 4.5% were cohabitating couples, 9.8% had a female householder with no spouse or partner present and 6.6% had a male householder with no spouse or partner present. 12.3% of all households were non-families. 7.4% of all households were made up of individuals, 3.7% had someone living alone who was 65 years old or older.

The median age in the city was 43.0 years. 30.4% of the residents were under the age of 20; 4.1% were between the ages of 20 and 24; 19.7% were from 25 and 44; 33.2% were from 45 and 64; and 12.6% were 65 years of age or older. The gender makeup of the city was 49.1% male and 50.9% female.

=== 2010 census ===
As of the census of 2010, there were 577 people, 204 households, and 173 families living in the city. The population density was 322.3 inhabitants per square mile (124.4/km^{2}). There were 210 housing units at an average density of 117.3 per square mile (45.3/km^{2}). The racial makeup of the city was 97.1% White, 0.3% African American, 0.2% Native American, 1.4% Asian, and 1.0% from two or more races. Hispanic or Latino of any race were 1.0% of the population.

There were 204 households, of which 42.6% had children under the age of 18 living with them, 78.9% were married couples living together, 3.9% had a female householder with no husband present, 2.0% had a male householder with no wife present, and 15.2% were non-families. 10.8% of all households were made up of individuals, and 1.5% had someone living alone who was 65 years of age or older. The average household size was 2.83 and the average family size was 3.06.

The median age in the city was 40.6 years. 28.2% of residents were under the age of 18; 4.6% were between the ages of 18 and 24; 24.8% were from 25 to 44; 36.6% were from 45 to 64; and 5.9% were 65 years of age or older. The gender makeup of the city was 47.7% male and 52.3% female.

=== 2000 census ===
As of the census of 2000, there were 250 people, 95 households, and 70 families living in the city. The population density was 167.6 inhabitants per square mile (64.7/km^{2}). There were 97 housing units at an average density of 65.0 per square mile (25.1/km^{2}). The racial makeup of the city was 99.20% White, 0.40% Asian, and 0.40% from two or more races. Hispanic or Latino of any race were 0.40% of the population.

There were 95 households, out of which 35.8% had children under the age of 18 living with them, 67.4% were married couples living together, 5.3% had a female householder with no husband present, and 25.3% were non-families. 22.1% of all households were made up of individuals, and 5.3% had someone living alone who was 65 years of age or older. The average household size was 2.63 and the average family size was 3.07.

26.8% are under the age of 18, 6.4% from 18 to 24, 33.2% from 25 to 44, 25.6% from 45 to 64, and 8.0% who were 65 years of age or older. The median age was 36 years. For every 100 females, there were 101.6 males. For every 100 females age 18 and over, there were 101.1 males.

The median income for a household in the city was $61,875, and the median income for a family was $66,875. Males had a median income of $41,364 versus $26,136 for females. The per capita income for the city was $24,690. None of the families and 1.8% of the population were living below the poverty line.

== Notable people ==
- Jeff Cooling, member of the Iowa House of Representatives
- Benny Johnson, political commentator
- Scott Schebler, professional baseball player
- Robin Lord Taylor, film and television actor
- Hailey Whitters, country music singer
