= Cory Booker 2020 presidential campaign =

American political campaign

- Campaign: 2020 United States presidential election (Democratic Party primaries)
- Candidate: Cory Booker; U.S. Senator from New Jersey (2013–present); Mayor of Newark, New Jersey (2006–2013)
- Announced: February 1, 2019
- Suspended: January 13, 2020
- Headquarters: Newark, New Jersey
- Key people: Addisu Demissie (campaign manager); Jenna Lowenstein (deputy campaign manager); Matt Klapper (senior advisor); Modia Butler; Tamia Booker (national political director); Jeff Giertz (national communications director); Michael Tyler (deputy national communications director)
- Receipts: US$25,078,205.34 (12/31/2019)
- Slogan(s): Together, America, We Will Rise United as one under one banner.

Website
- corybooker.com (archived - January 12, 2020)

On February 1st, 2019, U.S. Senator Cory Booker announced his 2020 presidential campaign. Booker went on to participate in five Democratic presidential debates, but failed to qualify for the sixth debate. He suspended his campaign on January 13, 2020, later endorsing former Vice President Joe Biden, who went on to win the Democratic nomination and the general election.

== Background ==
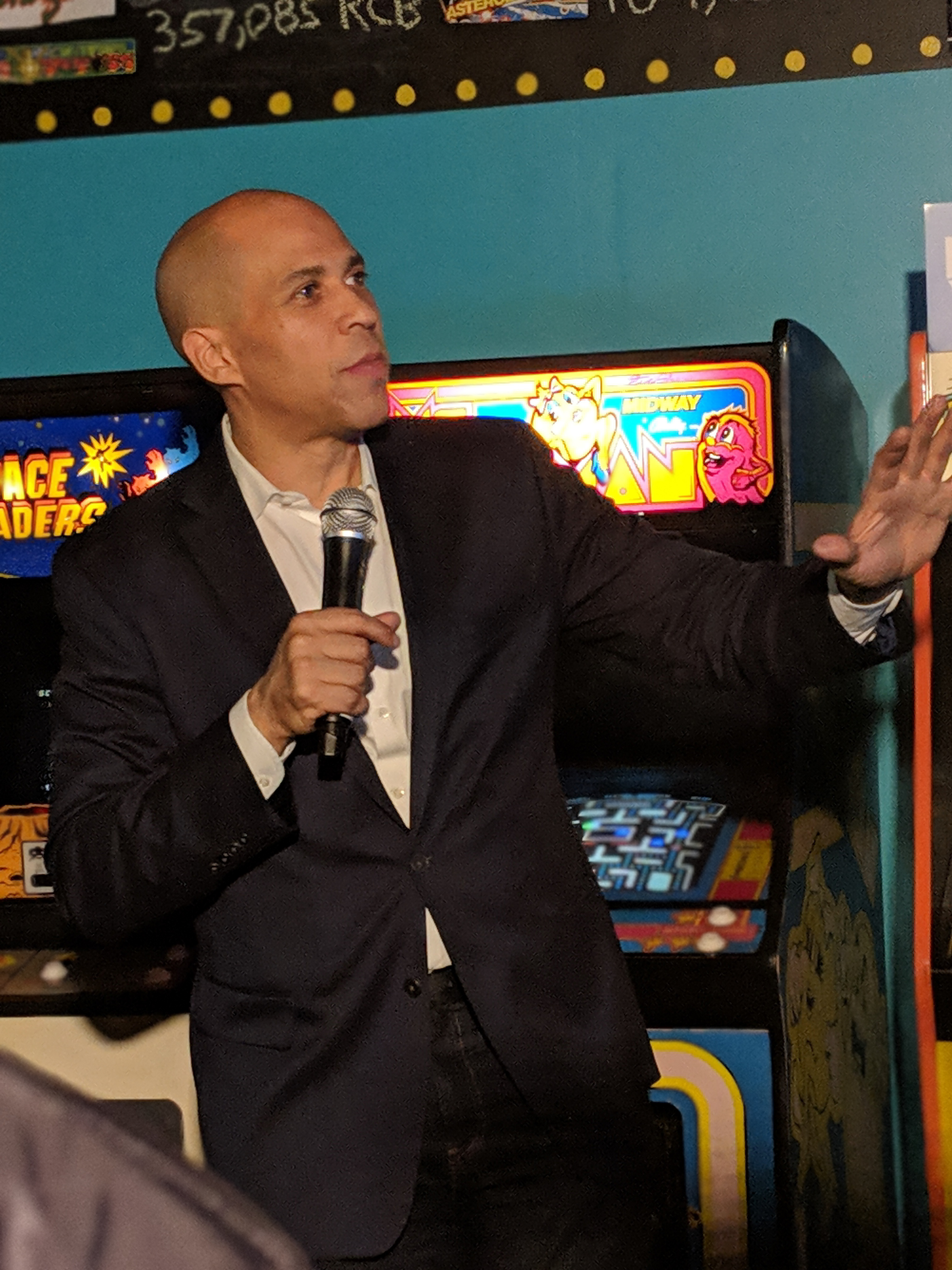
Booker campaigns in New Hampshire in February 2019.

In 2018, Politico identified Booker as part of the "Hell-No Caucus." Along with Senators Harris, Gillibrand, Warren and Sanders, he had voted overwhelmingly against Trump nominees for administration jobs. All five of the Senators in this group were considered potential 2020 presidential contenders.

Booker was widely expected to run for president in 2020. His idealistic rhetoric and vocal defense for the rights of black people, women, and LGBT people (groups who tend to belong to the Democratic Party's base) in hearings dating back to 2017 had been seen as positioning for a 2020 run. Booker had openly considered a presidential bid as early as September 2018. He began making trips to early campaign locations in 2018 and early 2019.

== History ==
Booker's 2020 presidential campaign was announced on February 1, 2019, when a video entitled "We Will Rise" was posted on Booker's YouTube channel. Booker intentionally chose the first day of Black History Month to announce his candidacy.

Within a month after Booker announced his candidacy, New Jersey Governor Phil Murphy, U.S. Sen. Bob Menendez, and every Democratic member of the House of Representatives from New Jersey endorsed him. Booker held a campaign kickoff rally in Newark on April 13.

Booker opened his campaign headquarters in the historic renovated New Jersey Bell Headquarters Building on Broad Street in Newark, New Jersey in March 2019. He launched a two-week campaign tour from there on April 14, 2019.

Booker focused much of his campaigning on an effort to win the 2020 Iowa Democratic presidential caucuses. On July 5, 2019, Booker hosted a roundtable discussion on immigration in Las Vegas, Nevada, saying the panel consisted "of folks who are, in my opinion, some of the bright lights in the nation for being activists around issues that are best for our country, issues that represent our values, and, frankly, the issues that are just helping to deal with what I see as a very, very dark period in American history."

The Booker campaign did not accept contributions from corporate PACs or federally registered lobbyists. Donations from other political action committees, such as the Environment America organization, were still accepted.

Booker's support amongst Democratic voters hovered in the low single digits throughout much of his campaign. After qualifying for the first five Democratic Party presidential debates, he failed to meet the polling thresholds to participate in the sixth debate in December 2019. Booker suspended his presidential campaign on January 13, 2020. He endorsed Joe Biden for president in March 2020.

== Political positions ==
=== Crime ===
Booker has condemned the war on drugs, calling it "a war on people" and a "tremendous failure"; in 2013 he criticized the Obama administration for not honoring state drug laws and raiding medical marijuana dispensaries. He has also expressed support for medical marijuana research, decriminalizing marijuana, ending mandatory minimum sentences for non-violent drug offenders, increasing funding for prisoner re-entry programs, and bringing an end to for-profit, private prisons. Booker has also cosponsored the bipartisan STATES Act proposed in the 115th Congress by Warren (Massachusetts) and Gardner (Colorado) that would exempt individuals or corporations in compliance with state cannabis laws from federal enforcement of the Controlled Substances Act. Booker also supports changing discriminatory jail sentencing laws.

In June 2018, Booker joined with Sen. Kamala Harris (D-California) and Sen. Tim Scott (R-South Carolina) to introduce a bill to make lynching a federal hate crime. 16 other Senators signed as co-sponsors, and the bill was supported by Majority Leader Mitch McConnell (R-Kentucky). Between 1882 and 1986, nearly 200 anti-lynching bills were introduced, yet none had passed the Senate until this bill passed unanimously in December 2018, then held at the desk of the House. In February 2019, the Senate backed it with a voice vote.

==== Guns ====
Booker has publicly defended the right of law-abiding citizens to own legal fire arms and blames most shootings on criminals with illegal guns. He voted to prohibit people on terror watch lists from buying guns. He co-sponsored legislation with Dianne Feinstein to ban assault weapons. On Parkland shooting's anniversary, he and other candidates urged stricter gun laws. Booker advanced his position in the same month,

... House of Representatives ... finally passed the "background check bill" which is due to a lot of activism, a lot of struggle ... this was a bipartisan bill as well ... over 95% of Americans believe in common sense comprehensive background checks ... We have got to get this done

=== Economy ===
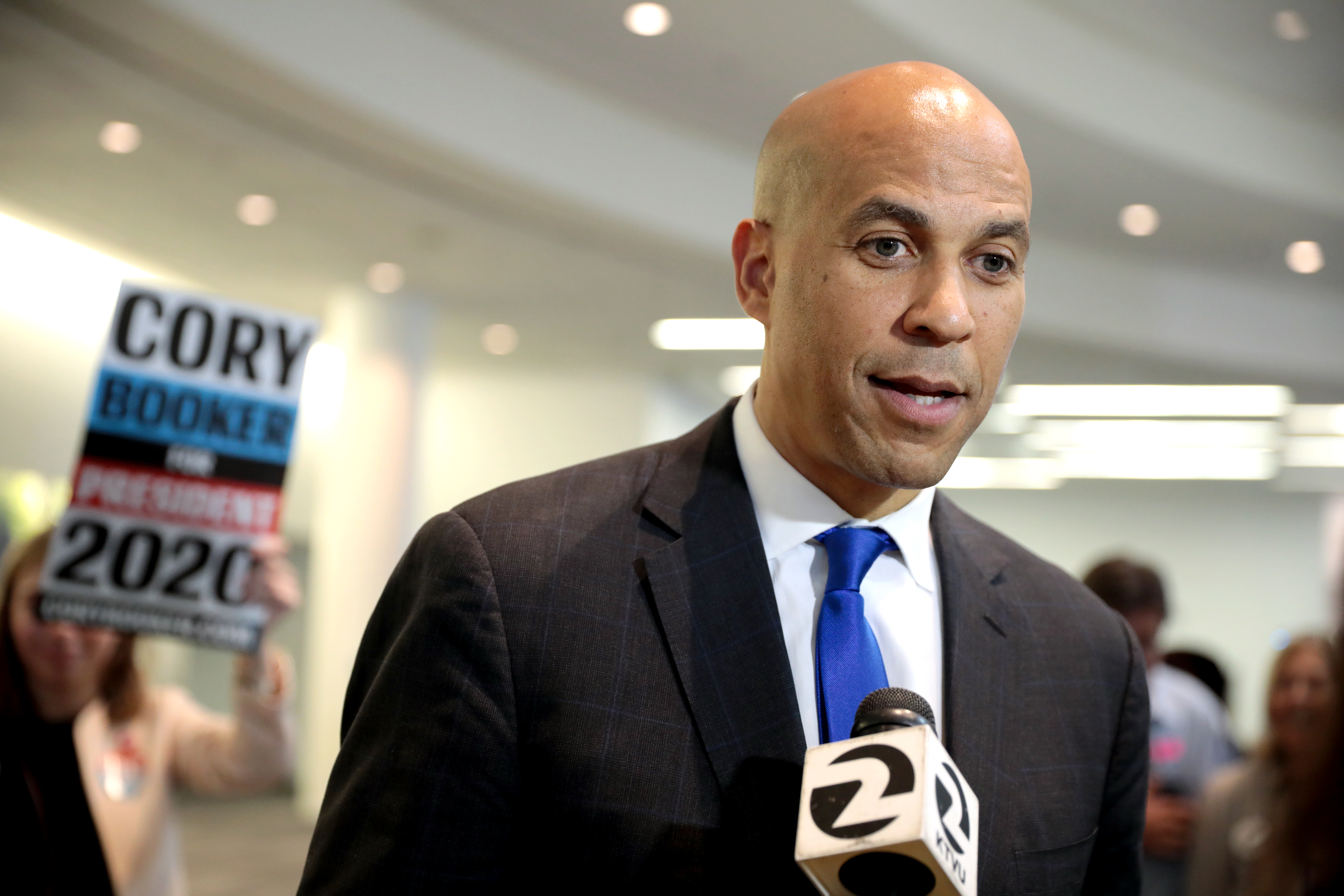
Booker speaking with the media after delivering a speech to the California Democratic Party State Convention in 2019.

In May 2012, Booker defended Bain Capital's record and criticized Obama's attack on private equity. In response, the Republican National Committee created a petition called "I Stand With Cory Booker".

Booker is in favor of creating so-called "baby bonds", whereby newborns would be given low-risk savings accounts (managed by the Treasury) that would be worth tens of thousands of dollars by the age of 18. According to an analysis by Naomi Zwede of the Center on Social Policy and poverty at Columbia University, the baby bonds would almost entirely close the racial wealth gap among young people.

==== Labor rights ====
Booker supports an increase of the minimum wage to $15 an hour. Speaking to Newark airport workers in May 2017 he said, "It is un-American to be in this country, to work a full-time job and still live in poverty. That is unacceptable. The minimum wage working at a lot of these contract companies only affords them about $22,000 a year ... You cannot live and raise a family on $22,000 a year. You can't afford housing, you can't afford child care and since your company isn't helping you with retirement, you can't save for retirement."

In June 2018, Booker was 1 of 8 senators to sponsor a bill amending the Fair Labor Standards Act of 1938 to include a mandate forcing farmers to pay workers time and a half for each hour worked past the standard 40-hour work week.

==== Tech ====
Booker wants to see the tech sector reach its fullest potential, and to do that, he thinks the U.S. government needs to ease up on regulations. For example, the Federal Aviation Administration has hindered drone innovation to the point where drone companies are leaving the U.S. to test and build in Europe. "We're being left behind on everything from next-generation nuclear energy to driverless cars ..." Booker said, "and we cannot get left behind".

In stark contrast to Warren and Sanders, Booker invites Amazon to set up a major office (nicknamed "HQ2") in Newark, New Jersey.

=== Environment ===
Booker has the most pro-animal welfare Senate-voting record according to the Humane Society. He is vegan and says that planet Earth cannot sustain First World meat-eating habits as prosperity spreads worldwide.

Booker backs the scientific consensus on global warming that it is man-made and is in favor of cap-and-trade or a carbon tax for reducing greenhouse gas emissions. He backs the Green New Deal:

In fact, the energy and the industry of the future, we can define the way and not the Chinese do it or other countries do it. America has got to lead again. We can get a green future and an economically prosperous future which works for everybody.

In September 2018, Booker was 1 of 8 senators (along with Harris) to cosponsor the Climate Risk Disclosure Act, a bill described by Warren as using "market forces to speed up the transition from fossil fuels to cleaner energy — reducing the odds of an environmental and financial disaster without spending a dime of taxpayer money."

In November 2018, Booker was 1 of 25 Democratic senators to cosponsor a resolution specifying key findings of the Intergovernmental Panel On Climate Change report and National Climate Assessment. The resolution affirmed the senators' acceptance of the findings and their support for bold action toward addressing climate change.

=== Foreign policy ===
Booker supports scaling down U.S. involvement in Afghanistan and is against intervention in Syria. After the US strike on Syria in April 2017, he criticized military action "without a clear plan" or authorization from Congress. He supports a two-state solution to the Israeli–Palestinian conflict. On Iran, he has supported the Iran nuclear deal framework and has drawn criticism.

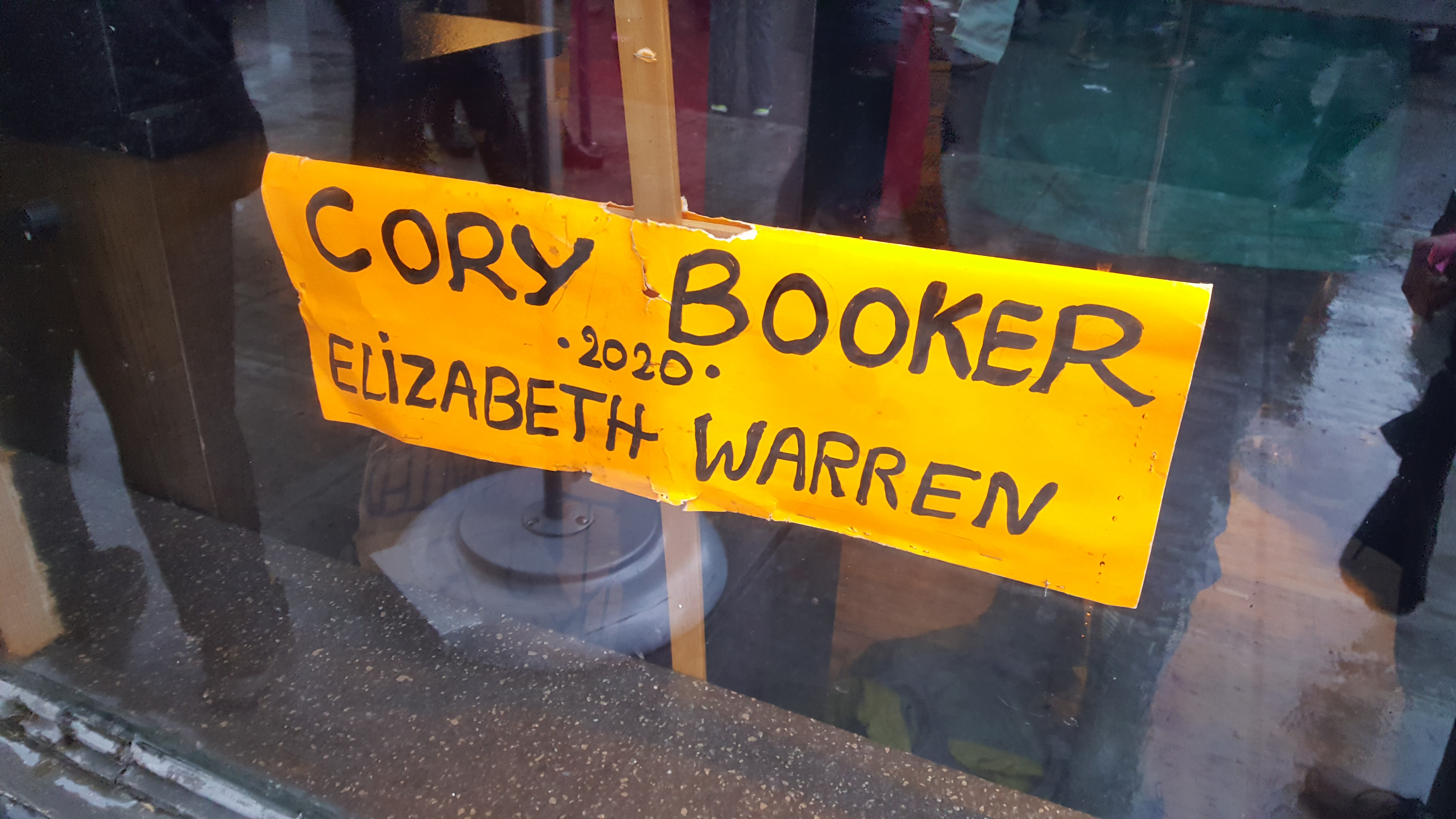
Sign at the Women's March on Portland 2017, held the day after the Inauguration of Donald Trump.

=== Human rights ===
Regarding abortion, Booker opposes overturning Roe v. Wade.

Booker termed the President's military transgender ban "deplorable and despicable".

==== Discrimination ====
Booker advocates same-sex marriage and claimed New Jersey's civil union law was not only bigoted, but also discriminated against New Jersey's same-sex couples who were denied 1,100 federal rights, privileges and benefits afforded to married couples. After Governor Chris Christie vetoed a bill legalizing same-sex marriage in New Jersey and said the issue should be left to a public referendum of the people of New Jersey, Booker criticized him and said that civil rights are guaranteed by the US Constitution and should not be allowed on the ballot. As Newark Mayor, Booker refused to perform any weddings until same-sex couples were legally allowed. On October 21, 2013, the date when same-sex marriage became legal, Booker began performing same-sex and opposite-sex weddings.

In November 2013, Booker co-sponsored and voted for the Employment Non-Discrimination Act. In January 2014, he co-sponsored the Respect for Marriage Act.

In October 2018, Booker was 1 of 20 senators to sign a letter to Secretary of State Mike Pompeo urging him to reverse the rolling back of a policy that granted visas to same-sex partners of LGBT diplomats who had unions which were not recognized by their home countries, writing that too many places around the world have seen LGBT individuals "subjected to discrimination and unspeakable violence, and receive little or no protection from the law or local authorities" and that the US refusing to let LGBT diplomats bring their partners to the US would be equivalent of America upholding "the discriminatory policies of many countries around the world."

Regarding racism, Booker tweeted that "Black women are nearly 4 times more likely than white women to die as a result of childbirth".

=== Immigration ===
Among Booker's stances on immigration, he believes immigrant detention should be eliminated to the extent possible. He has written that America needs to guarantee hormone therapy for transgender asylum seekers that have been detained.

Regarding immigration detention, a joint letter dated June 2015 by 33 senators (including Gillibrand, Warren, and Sanders) criticized that as "unacceptable and goes against our most fundamental values".

In July 2018, Booker was among 11 senators to sign a letter requesting the agencies responsible for reuniting families provide weekly updates, until every separated child was returned to their parents, in the form of a list of separated children, a list of their parents and other adult members of their families in addition to a list connecting the lists of children and parents and a briefing for the lawmakers on the strategies used to reunite families, and was 1 of 22 senators to sponsor the Stop Shackling and Detaining Pregnant Women Act, which if enacted would prohibit immigration officers from detaining pregnant women in a majority of circumstances and improve conditions of care for individuals in custody. In January 2019, Booker was 1 of 21 senators to sponsor the Dreamer Confidentiality Act, a bill imposing a ban on the DHS from passing information collected on DACA recipients to ICE, CBP, the DOJ, or any other law enforcement agency with exceptions in the case of fraudulent claims, national security issues, or non-immigration related felonies being investigated.

In a TV interview, he was asked what the people should do,

... the appalling silence and inaction of the good people ... First of all, understand. I have said this for years. The "power of the people" is greater than "the people in power". And, the most common way that the people surrender their power is not recognizing they have in the first place. So, the first thing to do is just not to be silent. The second thing is that when I went down to the border, I was blown away by the volunteers I saw showing up there, the people that were willing to go out, literally walk out onto the bridges where people are trying to do the legal thing and present them out for asylum ... Change does not come from Washington, it comes to Washington. They can call, they can protest, they can serve, they can volunteer, they can give resources...

Booker opined that the federal government's inability to construct the Mexico–United States border wall, for which president Trump declared a national emergency situation, is not an emergency.

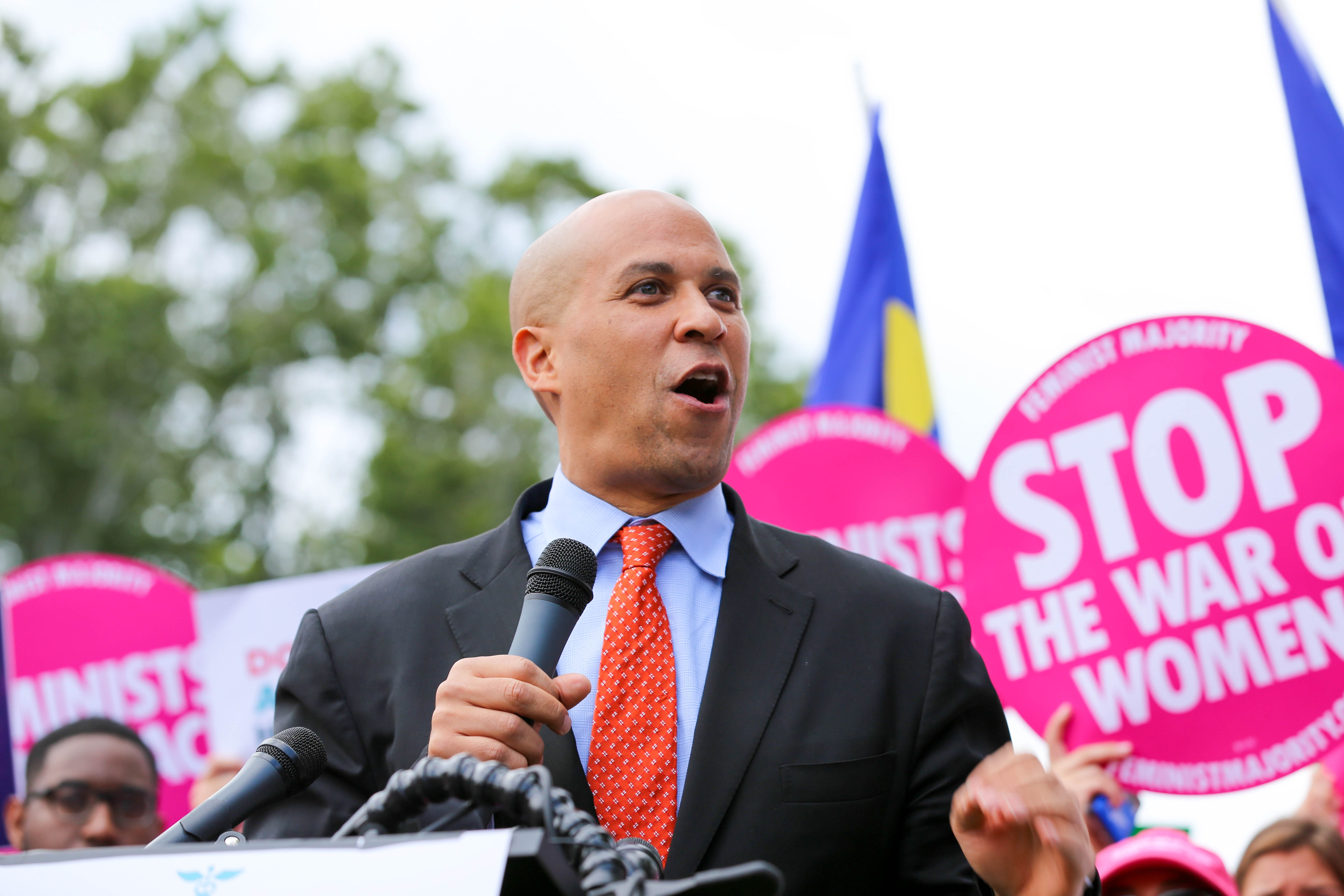
Booker at a rally opposing the American Health Care Act of 2017

=== Health care ===
Booker supports holding pharmaceutical companies accountable when they "gouge folks." He co-sponsored a bill that would take away patents if a company raises prices above what other countries are raising, allowing generic drugs to make the drug cheaper. In 2018 that introduced a bill that would "shine a light into drug company payments to individuals with influence over the types of drugs preferred by states’ Medicaid programs." He has been criticized for taking money from pharmaceutical executives and PAC's, accruing almost a half million in donations since 2013.
