= 2024 Pop-Tarts Bowl =

American college football game

- 35th Pop-Tarts Bowl
Iowa State Cyclones	Miami Hurricanes
(10–3)	(10–2)
Big 12	ACC
42	41
Head coach: Matt Campbell	Head coach: Mario Cristobal
AP / Coaches / CFP; 18 / 19 / 18	AP / Coaches / CFP; 15 / 16 / 13
	1	2	3	4	Total
Iowa State	21	7	7	7	42
Miami	14	17	7	3	41
- Date: December 28, 2024
- Season: 2024
- Stadium: Camping World Stadium
- Location: Orlando, Florida
- MVP: Rocco Becht (QB, Iowa State)
- Favorite: Miami (FL) by 5.5
- Referee: Jeff Heaser (SEC)
- Attendance: 38,650

United States TV coverage
- Network: ABC; ESPN Radio
- Announcers: Tom Hart (play-by-play), Jordan Rodgers (analyst), and Cole Cubelic (sideline) (ABC); Mike Couzens (play-by-play) and Max Starks (analyst) (ESPN Radio)

The 2024 Pop-Tarts Bowl was a college football bowl game that was played on December 28, 2024, at Camping World Stadium in Orlando, Florida. The 35th annual Pop-Tarts Bowl (although only the second edition using that name) featured Iowa State and the University of Miami (Florida). The game began at approximately 3:30 p.m. EST and aired on ABC. The Pop-Tarts Bowl was one of the 2024–25 bowl games concluding the 2024 FBS football season. The bowl game's title sponsor was Kellanova through their Pop-Tarts brand.

== Teams ==
Consistent with conference tie-ins, the game featured Miami from the Atlantic Coast Conference and Iowa State of the Big 12 Conference. This was the first meeting between the teams.

=== Iowa State Cyclones ===
Iowa State compiled a regular-season record of 10–2 (7–2 in conference). The Cyclones began their season with seven consecutive wins, and were nationally ranked as high as ninth. They briefly dropped out of the rankings after back-to-back losses, then finished the regular season with three wins. They faced Arizona State in the Big 12 Championship Game, losing by a score of 45–19. The Cyclones were placed 18th in the final College Football Playoff (CFP) rankings. Iowa State faced three ranked FBS teams, defeating Iowa and Kansas State while losing to Arizona State. The Cyclones entered the bowl with a 10–3 record.

=== Miami Hurricanes ===
Miami ended the regular season with a record of 10–2 (6–2 in conference). The Hurricanes were ranked as high as fourth after winning their first nine games. They then lost two of three and were placed 13th in the final CFP rankings. Miami did not face any ranked teams during the regular season.

== Game summary ==
2024 Pop-Tarts Bowl

Quarter	1	2	3	4	Total
No. 18 Iowa State	21	7	7	7	42
No. 13 Miami (FL)	14	17	7	3	41

at Camping World Stadium • Orlando, Florida

- Date: Saturday, December 28, 2024
- Game time: 3:35 p.m. EST
- Game weather: Cloudy • Temperature: 75 °F (24 °C) • Wind: 14 mph (23 km/h) southeast
- Game attendance: 38,650
- Referee: Jeff Heaser
- TV announcers (ABC): Tom Hart (play-by-play), Jordan Rodgers (analyst), and Cole Cubelic (sideline)
- Box score

Game information

First Quarter

- (11:23) ISU – Gabe Burkle 9 yard pass from Rocco Becht, Kyle Konrardy kick (Drive: 7 plays, 22 yards, 3:30; Iowa State 7–0)
- (11:10) MIA – Damien Martinez 75 yard run, Andres Borregales kick (Drive: 1 plays, 75 yards, 0:13; Tied 7–7)
- (8:34) ISU – Carson Hansen 30 yard run, Kyle Konrardy kick (Drive: 6 plays, 75 yards, 2:36; Iowa State 14–7)
- (4:12) MIA – Jacolby George 4 yard pass from Cam Ward, Andres Borregales kick (Drive: 7 plays, 75 yards, 4:22; Tied 14–14)
- (2:23) ISU – Carson Hansen 1 yard run, Kyle Konrardy kick (Drive: 6 plays, 65 yards, 1:49; Iowa State 21–14)

Second Quarter

- (13:30) MIA – Joshisa Trader 40 yard pass from Cam Ward, Andres Borregales kick (Drive: 9 plays, 75 yards, 3:50; Tied 21–21)
- (10:43) ISU – Carson Hansen 13 yard pass from Rocco Becht, Kyle Konrardy kick (Drive: 7 plays, 75 yards, 2:50; Iowa State 28–21)
- (9:25) MIA – Elijah Arroyo 33 yard pass from Cam Ward, Andres Borregales kick (Drive: 3 plays, 72 yards, 1:18; Tied 28–28)
- (0:16) MIA – Andres Borregales 30 yard field goal (Drive: 12 plays, 55 yards, 3:30; Miami (FL) 31–28)

Third Quarter

- (8:09) MIA – Mark Fletcher Jr. 1 yard run, Andres Borregales kick (Drive: 10 plays, 71 yards, 6:01; Miami (FL) 38–28)
- (2:20) ISU – Jaylin Noel 4 yard pass from Rocco Becht, Kyle Konrardy kick (Drive: 10 plays, 75 yards, 5:49; Miami (FL) 38–35)

Fourth Quarter

- (9:40) MIA – Andres Borregales 21 yard field goal (Drive: 14 plays, 72 yards, 7:40; Miami (FL) 41–35)
- (0:56) ISU – Rocco Becht 1 yard run, Kyle Konrardy kick (Drive: 15 plays, 84 yards, 5:38; Iowa State 42–41)

Miami fumbled on the first play of the game, which Iowa State recovered. The Cyclones capitalized on the short field with a touchdown by Gabe Burkle. Damien Martinez responded to tie the game, but [[Carson Hansen]] scored a 30-yard rushing touchdown to retake the lead for Iowa State. The Hurricanes tied the game up with a Cam Ward touchdown pass to Jacolby George, which also set the NCAA passing touchdown record at 156. Rocco Becht scored another touchdown for Iowa State by passing the ball to Jaylin Noel, putting Iowa State ahead 21–14. This was the score at the end of the first quarter.

In the second quarter, the Hurricanes tied the game yet again with a 40-yard touchdown pass to Joshisha Trader. Hansen responded with another touchdown run for the Cyclones, and Elijah Arroyo responded for the Hurricanes to tie the game for the fourth time. However, the Cyclones punt, the Hurricanes fumble and the Cyclones fail to convert on 4th down, allowing Miami to take their first lead of the day, a 31–28 lead, into halftime.

The Cyclones were forced to punt after halftime, and Mark Fletcher scored for Miami to put the Hurricanes ahead 38–28. The Cyclones were able to score a touchdown to cut the lead to 38–35, with a Becht quarterback sneak. Early in the fourth quarter, Miami kicked a field goal to extend their lead to 41–35. Both teams went three-and-out afterwards, including Miami's first punt of the game. Iowa State, with the ball at their own 16, marched 84 yards down the field and took a 42–41 lead with less than a minute left. Miami attempted a 60-yard Hail Mary to win the game, but Drew Surges intercepted the pass to end the game.

=== Statistics ===
Statistics	ISU	MIA
First downs	24	24
Plays–yards	67–415	72–524
Rushes–yards	31–145	32–308
Passing yards	270	216
Passing: comp–att–int	22–36–0	17–33–1
Turnovers		
Time of possession	27:41	32:19

Team	Category	Player	Statistics
Iowa State	Passing	Rocco Becht	22/36, 270 yards, 3 TD
Iowa State	Rushing	Carson Hansen	16 carries, 82 yards, 2 TD
Iowa State	Receiving	Jaylin Noel	8 receptions, 117 yards, TD
Miami (FL)	Passing	Cam Ward	12/19, 190 yards, 3 TD
Miami (FL)	Rushing	Damien Martinez	14 carries, 179 yards, TD
Miami (FL)	Receiving	Elijah Arroyo	4 receptions, 64 yards, TD

== See also ==
- 2024 Cure Bowl, contested at the same venue eight days earlier
- 2024 Citrus Bowl (December), contested at the same venue three days later
