= 2024 Iowa State Cyclones football team =

American college football season

2024 Iowa State Cyclones football

Pop-Tarts Bowl champion

Big 12 Championship Game, L 19–45 vs. Arizona State

Pop-Tarts Bowl, W 42–41 vs. Miami (FL)
- Conference: Big 12 Conference

Ranking
- Coaches: No. 15
- AP: No. 15
- Record: 11–3 (7–2 Big 12)
- Head coach: Matt Campbell (9th season)
- Offensive coordinator: Taylor Mouser (1st season)
- Offensive scheme: Spread
- Defensive coordinator: Jon Heacock (9th season)
- Base defense: 3-high safety
- Home stadium: Jack Trice Stadium

2024 Big 12 Conference football standings
	Conf.			Overall
Team	W		L	W		L
No. 7 Arizona State y$^	7	–	2	11	–	3
No. 15 Iowa State y	7	–	2	11	–	3
No. 13 BYU	7	–	2	11	–	2
No. 25 Colorado	7	–	2	9	–	4
Baylor	6	–	3	8	–	5
TCU	6	–	3	9	–	4
Texas Tech	6	–	3	8	–	5
Kansas State	5	–	4	9	–	4
West Virginia	5	–	4	6	–	7
Kansas	4	–	5	5	–	7
Cincinnati	3	–	6	5	–	7
Houston	3	–	6	4	–	8
Utah	2	–	7	5	–	7
UCF	2	–	7	4	–	8
Arizona	2	–	7	4	–	8
Oklahoma State	0	–	9	3	–	9
Championship: Arizona State 45, Iowa State 19
^ – College Football Playoff participant; $ – Conference champion; y – Championship game participant; Rankings from AP Poll

The 2024 Iowa State Cyclones football team represented Iowa State University as a member of Big 12 Conference during the 2024 NCAA Division I FBS football season. Led by ninth-year head coach Matt Campbell, the Cyclones compiled an overall record of 11–3 with a mark of 7–2 in conference play, placing in a four-way tie for first in the Big 12 with Arizona State, BYU, and Colorado. Iowa State advanced to the Big 12 Championship Game, where the Cyclones lost to Arizona State. Despite coming short against the Sun Devils, the Cyclones upset the No. 13 Miami Hurricanes in the Pop-Tarts Bowl, 42–41, garnering the first 11-win season in program history. The team played home games at Jack Trice Stadium in Ames, Iowa.

Following a comeback 38–35 win against UCF on October 19, the Cyclones achieved their best start since 1938, and a 4–0 start in Big 12 play. With the win against Kansas State in the annual Farmageddon game on November 30, the Cyclones clinched their first ever ten-win season; a win by BYU later that night gave Iowa State the right to play Arizona State in the Big 12 Championship Game, the Cyclones' first appearance in the conference game title since 2020.

== Schedule ==
Date	Time	Opponent	Rank	Site	TV	Result	Attendance
August 31	2:30 p.m.	No. 24 (FCS) North Dakota*		Jack Trice Stadium; Ames, IA	FS1	W 21–3	56,148
September 7	2:30 p.m.	at No. 21 Iowa*		Kinnick Stadium; Iowa City, IA (Cy-Hawk Trophy)	CBS	W 20–19	69,250
September 21	1:00 p.m.	Arkansas State*	No. 20	Jack Trice Stadium; Ames, IA	ESPN+*	W 52–7	55,428
September 28	6:00 p.m.	at Houston	No. 18	TDECU Stadium; Houston, TX	FS1	W 20–0	25,138
October 5	6:30 p.m.	Baylor	No. 16	Jack Trice Stadium; Ames, IA	Fox	W 43–21	61,500
October 12	7:00 p.m.	at West Virginia	No. T–11	Milan Puskar Stadium; Morgantown, WV	Fox	W 28–16	55,202
October 19	6:30 p.m.	UCF	No. 9	Jack Trice Stadium; Ames, IA	FS1	W 38–35	61,500
November 2	2:30 p.m.	Texas Tech^{†}	No. 11т	Jack Trice Stadium; Ames, IA	ESPN	L 22–23	61,500
November 9	2:30 p.m.	at Kansas	No. 17	Arrowhead Stadium; Kansas City, MO	FS1	L 36–45	51,109
November 16	7:00 p.m.	Cincinnati		Jack Trice Stadium; Ames, IA	Fox	W 34–17	52,881
November 23	6:30 p.m.	at Utah	No. 22	Rice–Eccles Stadium; Salt Lake City, UT	Fox	W 31–28	52,152
November 30	6:30 p.m.	No. 24 Kansas State	No. 18	Jack Trice Stadium; Ames, IA (rivalry)	Fox	W 29–21	56,228
December 7	11:00 a.m.	vs. No. 15 Arizona State	No. 16	AT&T Stadium; Arlington, TX (Big 12 Championship Game)	ABC	L 19–45	55,889
December 28	2:30 p.m.	vs. No. 13 Miami (FL)*	No. 18	Camping World Stadium; Orlando, FL (Pop-Tarts Bowl)	ABC	W 42–41	38,650
*Non-conference game; ^{†}Homecoming; Rankings from AP Poll (and CFP Rankings, after November 5) - Released prior to game; All times are in Central time

- Game partially aired on ESPN2 as a live look-in due to the Kansas-West Virginia lightning delay.

== Preseason ==
=== Big 12 preseason media poll ===
The Big 12 preseason media poll was released on July 2, 2024. Iowa State was picked to finish sixth in the conference.

== Game summaries ==
=== vs No. 24 (FCS) North Dakota ===
No. 24 (FCS) North Dakota Fighting Hawks (0–0) vs Iowa State Cyclones (0–0) – Game summary

Quarter	1	2	3	4	Total
No. 24 (FCS) Fighting Hawks	0	3	0	0	3
Cyclones	7	7	0	7	21

at Jack Trice Stadium • Ames, IA

- Date: August 31, 2024
- Game time: 2:30 p.m.
- Game weather: clear, 82 °F (28 °C), SW 9 MPH
- Game attendance: 56,148
- Referee: Mike McCabe
- TV announcers (FS1): Eric Collins (play-by-play) and Spencer Tillman (analyst)

Game information

First Quarter

- (14:22) ISU - Higgins, Jayden 21 yd pass from Becht, Rocco (Konrardy, Kyle kick) (Drive: 2 plays, 75 yards, 0:38; ISU 7–0)

Second Quarter

- (3:00) UND – Elrichs, CJ 26 yd field goal (Drive: 23 plays, 88 yards, 12:24; ISU 7–3)
- (0:48) ISU - Noel, Jaylin 14 yd pass from Becht, Rocco (Konrardy, Kyle kick) (Drive: 7 plays, 65 yards, 2:12; ISU 14–3)

Fourth Quarter

- (12:33) ISU - ISU - Becht, Rocco 2 yd run (Konrardy, Kyle kick) (Drive: 12 plays, 96 yards, 6:54; ISU 21–3)

Statistics	UND	ISU
First downs	20	18
Total yards	295	353
Rushing yards	174	86
Passing yards	121	267
Passing: Comp–Att–Int	17–30–1	20–26–0
Time of possession	37:51	22:09

Team	Category	Player	Statistics
North Dakota	Passing	Simon Romfo	17–30, 121 yds, INT
North Dakota	Rushing	Isaiah Smith	12 car, 50 yds
North Dakota	Receiving	Bo Belquist	6 rec, 43 yds
Iowa State	Passing	Rocco Becht	20–26, 267 yds, 2 TD
Iowa State	Rushing	Abu Sama	5 car, 36 yds
Iowa State	Receiving	Jaylin Noel	8 rec, 135 yds, TD

=== at No. 21 Iowa ===
Iowa State Cyclones (1–0) at No. 21 Iowa Hawkeyes (1–0) – Game summary

Quarter	1	2	3	4	Total
Cyclones	0	0	14	6	20
No. 21 Hawkeyes	7	6	6	0	19

at Kinnick Stadium • Iowa City, IA

- Date: September 7, 2024
- Game time: 2:30 p.m.
- Game weather: Sunny • Temperature: 66 °F (19 °C) • Wind: N at 10 miles per hour (16 km/h)
- Game attendance: 69,250
- Referee: Kevin Mar
- TV announcers (CBS/Compass Media): Brad Nessler (play-by-play), Gary Danielson (analyst), and Jenny Dell (sideline)/Gregg Daniels (play-by-play) and Chad Brown (analyst)

Game information

First Quarter

- (6:29) UI - Johnson, Kaleb 27 yd run (Stevens, Drew kick) (Drive: 2 plays, 43 yards, 0:45; UI 7–0)

Second Quarter

- (13:38) UI - Stevens, Drew 23 yd field goal (Drive: 7 plays, 7 yards, 2:13; UI 10–0)
- (01:11) UI - Stevens, Drew 21 yd field goal (Drive: 10 plays, 77 yards, 1:46; UI 13–0)

Third Quarter

- (8:48) ISU - Higgins, Jayden 3 yd pass from Becht, Rocco (Konrardy, Kyle kick)(Drive: 9 plays, 75 yards, 4:32; UI 13–7)
- (4:47) UI - Johnson, Kaleb 3 yd run (McNamara, Cade pass attempt failed) (Drive: 7 plays, 79 yards, 3:55; UI 19–7)
- (4:36) ISU - Noel, Jaylin 75 yd pass from Becht, Rocco (Konrardy, Kyle kick) (Drive: 1 play, 75 yards, 0:11; UI 19–14)

Fourth Quarter

- (11:32) ISU - Konrardy, Kyle 46 yd field goal (Drive: 5 plays, 23 yards, 1:59; UI 19–17)
- (00:06) ISU - Konrardy, Kyle 54 yd field goal (Drive: 5 plays, 42 yards, 0:28; ISU 20–19)

Statistics	ISU	IOWA
First downs	15	16
Total yards	361	303
Rushing yards	89	204
Passing yards	272	99
Passing: Comp–Att–Int	23–36–1	13–29–2
Time of possession	30:10	29:50

Team	Category	Player	Statistics
Iowa State	Passing	Rocco Becht	23–35, 272 yds, 2 TD, INT
Iowa State	Rushing	Abu Sama	17 car, 58 yds
Iowa State	Receiving	Jaylin Noel	5 rec, 133 yds, TD
Iowa	Passing	Cade McNamara	13–29, 99 yds, 2 INT
Iowa	Rushing	Kaleb Johnson	25 car, 187 yds, 2 TD
Iowa	Receiving	Jacob Gill	4 rec, 47 yds

=== vs Arkansas State ===
Arkansas State Red Wolves (2–1) vs No. 20 Iowa State Cyclones (2–0) – Game summary

Quarter	1	2	3	4	Total
Red Wolves	0	0	0	7	7
No. 20 Cyclones	14	17	7	14	52

at Jack Trice Stadium • Ames, IA

- Date: September 21, 2024
- Game time: 1:00 p.m.
- Game weather: Sunny • Temperature: 88 °F (31 °C) • Wind: SW at 15 miles per hour (24 km/h)
- Game attendance: 55,428
- Referee: Ted Pitts
- TV announcers (ESPN+): Richard Cross (play-by-play), Taylor McHargue (analyst), and Tori Petry (sideline)

Game information

First quarter

- (8:47) ISU – Carson Hansen 1-yard run, Kyle Konrardy kick (Drive: 6 plays, 60 yards, 2:29; Iowa State 7–0)
- (0:45) ISU – Rocco Becht 1-yard run, Kyle Konrardy kick (Drive: 10 plays, 80 yards, 4:08; Iowa State 14–0)

Second quarter

- (9:00) ISU – Kyle Konrardy 31-yard field goal (Drive: 6 plays, 52 yards, 2:29; Iowa State 17–0)
- (2:21) ISU – Tyler Moore 10-yard pass from Rocco Becht, Kyle Konrardy kick (Drive: 7 plays, 66 yards, 3:24; Iowa State 24–0)
- (1:27) ISU – Jayden Higgins 16-yard pass from Rocco Becht, Kyle Konrardy kick (Drive: 1 play, 16 yards, 0:04; Iowa State 31–0)

Third quarter

- (8:00) ISU – Carson Hansen 3-yard run, Kyle Konrardy kick (Drive: 9 plays, 69 yards, 4:49; Iowa State 38–0)

Fourth quarter

- (11:54) ISU – Dylan Lee 1-yard run, Kyle Konrardy kick (Drive: 10 plays, 58 yards, 4:37; Iowa State 45–0)
- (4:53) ASU – Hunter Summers 27-yard pass from Timmy McClain, Clune Van Andel kick (Drive: 5 plays, 43 yards, 1:54; Iowa State 45–7)
- (0:24) ISU – Aiden Flora 8-yard run, Kyle Konrardy kick (Drive: 8 plays, 75 yards, 4:29; Iowa State 52–7)

Statistics	ARST	ISU
First downs	12	25
Total yards	182	490
Rushing yards	64	237
Passing yards	118	253
Passing: Comp–Att–Int	9–23–2	16–25–2
Time of possession	25:16	34:44

Team	Category	Player	Statistics
Arkansas State	Passing	Jaylen Raynor	5/16, 68 yards, 2 INT
Arkansas State	Rushing	Devin Spencer	9 carries, 52 yards
Arkansas State	Receiving	Hunter Summers	2 receptions, 37 yards, TD
Iowa State	Passing	Rocco Becht	11/18, 204 yards, 2 TD, INT
Iowa State	Rushing	Carson Hansen	9 carries, 58 yards, 2 TD
Iowa State	Receiving	Benjamin Brahmer	3 receptions, 73 yards

=== at Houston ===
No. 18 Iowa State Cyclones (3–0) at Houston Cougars (1–3) – Game summary

Quarter	1	2	3	4	Total
No. 18 Cyclones	3	0	7	10	20
Cougars	0	0	0	0	0

at TDECU Stadium • Houston, TX

- Date: September 28, 2024
- Game time: 6:00 p.m.
- Game weather: Sunny • Temperature: 92 °F (33 °C) • Wind: NW 10 miles per hour (16 km/h)
- Game attendance: 25,138
- Referee: Hank Johns
- TV announcers (FS1): Eric Collins (play-by-play) and Spencer Tillman (analyst)

Game information

First quarter

- (7:06) ISU – Kyle Konrardy 23-yard field goal (Drive: 11 plays, 65 yards, 5:25; Iowa State 3–0)

Second quarter

No scoring plays

Third quarter

- (2:12) ISU – Jayden Higgins 12-yard pass from Rocco Becht, Kyle Konrardy kick (Drive: 7 plays, 80 yards, 2:31; Iowa State 10–0)

Fourth quarter

- (11:39) ISU – Kyle Konrardy 34-yard field goal (Drive: 7 plays, 31 yards, 4:01; Iowa State 13–0)
- (5:39) ISU – Abu Sama 77-yard run, Kyle Konrardy kick (Drive: 2 plays, 80 yards, 0:59; Iowa State 20–0)

Statistics	ISU	HOU
First downs	19	11
Total yards	393	241
Rushing yards	240	169
Passing yards	153	72
Passing: Comp–Att–Int	17–28–0	9–16–2
Time of possession	34:55	25:05

Team	Category	Player	Statistics
Iowa State	Passing	Rocco Becht	17/28, 153 yards, TD
Iowa State	Rushing	Abu Sama	11 carries, 101 yards, TD
Iowa State	Receiving	Jayden Higgins	8 receptions, 79 yards, TD
Houston	Passing	Donovan Smith	8/12, 71 yards, INT
Houston	Rushing	Stacy Sneed	10 carries, 79 yards
Houston	Receiving	Stephon Johnson	4 receptions, 42 yards

=== vs Baylor ===
Baylor Bears (2–3) vs No. 16 Iowa State Cyclones (4–0) – Game summary

Quarter	1	2	3	4	Total
Bears	7	7	7	0	21
No. 16 Cyclones	3	16	14	10	43

at Jack Trice Stadium • Ames, IA

- Date: October 5, 2024
- Game time: 6:36 p.m.
- Game weather: Clear • Temperature: 83 °F (28 °C) • Wind: NW 10 miles per hour (16 km/h)
- Game attendance: 61,500
- Referee: Tutashinda Salaam
- TV announcers (FOX): Tim Brando (play-by-play), Devin Gardner (analyst), and Josh Sims (sideline)

Game information

First quarter

- (6:32) BU – Josh Cameron 4 Yd pass from Sawyer Robertson (Isaiah Hankins Kick) (Drive: 9 plays, 84 yards, 2:44; Baylor 7–0)
- (3:19) ISU - Kyle Konrardy 45 Yd Field Goal (Drive: 7 plays, 48 yards, 3:13; Baylor 7–3)

Second quarter

- (13:46) BU - Michael Trigg 8 Yd pass from Sawyer Robertson (Isaiah Hankins Kick) (Drive: 10 plays, 75 yards, 4:33; Baylor 14-3)
- (10:34) ISU - Kyle Konrardy 38 Yd Field Goal (Drive: 8 plays, 30 yards, 3:12; Baylor 14-6)
- (6:10) ISU - Benjamin Brahmer 10 Yd pass from Rocco Becht (Kyle Konrardy PAT failed) (Drive: 5 plays, 84 yards, 2:27; Baylor 14-12)
- (4:46) ISU - Caden Matson 25 Yd Return of Blocked Punt (Kyle Konrardy Kick) (Drive: 5 plays, 13 yards, 1:24; Iowa State 19-14)

Third quarter

- (12:55) BU - Ketron Jackson Jr. 25 Yd pass from Sawyer Robertson (Isaiah Hankins Kick) (Drive: 7 plays, 65 yards, 2:05; Baylor 21-19)
- (10:33) ISU - Jaylon Jackson 10 Yd Run (Kyle Konrardy Kick) (Drive: 5 plays, 75 yards, 2:22; Iowa State 26-21)
- (0:40) ISU - Jayden Higgins 11 Yd pass from Rocco Becht (Kyle Konrardy Kick) (Drive: 13 plays, 80 yards, 6:08; Iowa State 33-21)

Fourth quarter

- (11:31) ISU - Jaylon Jackson 20 Yd Run (Kyle Konrardy Kick) (Drive: 5 plays, 76 yards, 2:41; Iowa State 40-21)
- (2:16) ISU - Kyle Konrardy 22 Yd Field Goal (Drive: 12 plays, 73 yards, 8:41; Drive: 12 plays, 73 yards, 8:11; Iowa State 43-21)

Statistics	BAY	ISU
First downs	21	27
Total yards	337	542
Rushing yards	79	265
Passing yards	258	277
Passing: Comp–Att–Int	25–44–1	16–25–1
Time of possession	24:06	35:54

Team	Category	Player	Statistics
Baylor	Passing	Sawyer Robertson	25/44, 258 yards, 3 TD, INT
Baylor	Rushing	Bryson Washington	8 carries, 28 yards
Baylor	Receiving	Ketron Jackson Jr.	5 receptions, 66 yards, TD
Iowa State	Passing	Rocco Becht	16/25, 277 yards, 2 TD, INT
Iowa State	Rushing	Jaylon Jackson	15 carries, 107 yards, 2 TD
Iowa State	Receiving	Jayden Higgins	8 receptions, 116 yards, TD

=== at West Virginia ===
No. 11т Iowa State Cyclones (5–0) at West Virginia Mountaineers (3–2) – Game summary

Quarter	1	2	3	4	Total
No. 11т Cyclones	0	14	0	14	28
Mountaineers	7	3	0	6	16

at Milan Puskar Stadium • Morgantown, WV

- Date: October 12, 2024
- Game time: 7:05 p.m.
- Game weather: Clear • Temperature: 62 °F (17 °C) • Wind: SW 4 miles per hour (6.4 km/h)
- Game attendance: 55,202
- Referee: Cravonne Barrett
- TV announcers (FOX): Tim Brando (play-by-play), Devin Gardner (analyst), and Josh Sims (sideline)

Game information

First quarter

- (7:18) WVU – Jaheim White 8 Yd Run (Michael Hayes II Kick) (Drive: 14 plays, 75 yards, 7:42; WVU 7–0)

Second quarter

- (13:05) ISU – Jaylin Noel 60 Yd Pass from Rocco Becht (Kyle Konrardy Kick) (Drive: 3 plays, 80 yards, 0:58; Tied 7–7)
- (2:39) ISU – Carson Hansen 11 Yd Run (Kyle Konrardy Kick) (Drive: 17 plays, 91 yards, 8:08; ISU 14–7)
- (0:32) WVU – Michael Hayes II 43 Yd Field Goal (Drive: 10 plays, 50 yards, 2:07; ISU 14–10)

Third quarter

No scoring plays

Fourth quarter

- (11:57) ISU – Carson Hansen 3 Yd Run (Kyle Konrardy Kick) (Drive: 10 plays, 65 yards, 5:03; ISU 21–10)
- (4:42) ISU – Carson Hansen 2 Yd Run (Kyle Konrardy Kick) (Drive: 10 plays, 33 yards, 6:43; ISU 28–10)
- (1:10) WVU – Jaheim White 10 Yd Pass from Garrett Greene (Two-Point Pass Conversion Failed) (Drive: 11 plays, 67 yards, 3:25; ISU 28–16)

Statistics	ISU	WVU
First downs	24	23
Total yards	395	356
Rushing yards	130	150
Passing yards	265	206
Passing: Comp–Att–Int	18–26–0	18–32–2
Time of possession	33:03	26:57

Team	Category	Player	Statistics
Iowa State	Passing	Rocco Becht	18/26, 265 yards, TD
Iowa State	Rushing	Carson Hansen	20 carries, 96 yards, 3 TD
Iowa State	Receiving	Jayden Higgins	6 receptions, 102 yards
West Virginia	Passing	Garrett Greene	18/32, 206 yards, TD, 2 INT
West Virginia	Rushing	Garrett Greene	10 carries, 87 yards
West Virginia	Receiving	Kole Taylor	5 receptions, 55 yards

=== vs UCF ===
UCF Knights (3–3) vs No. 9 Iowa State Cyclones (6–0) – Game summary

Quarter	1	2	3	4	Total
Knights	7	14	7	7	35
No. 9 Cyclones	14	0	13	11	38

at Jack Trice Stadium • Ames, IA

- Date: October 19, 2024
- Game time: 6:30 p.m.
- Game weather: Clear • Temperature: 71 °F (22 °C) • Wind: SW 8 miles per hour (13 km/h)
- Game attendance: 61,500
- Referee: David Alvarez
- TV announcers (FS1): Trent Rush (play-by-play) and Spencer Tillman (analyst)

Game information

First quarter

- UCF – Jacurri Brown 6-yard touchdown run (Grant Reddick kick), 12:17
- ISU – Carson Hansen 57-yard touchdown run (Kyle Konrardy kick), 6:57
- ISU – Carson Hansen 5-yard touchdown run (Kyle Konrardy kick), 0:30

Second quarter

- UCF – RJ Harvey 80-yard touchdown run (Grant Reddick kick), 11:01
- UCF – Brandon Adams 63-yard interception return (Grant Reddick kick), 1:18

Third quarter

- UCF – Jacurri Brown 67-yard touchdown run (Grant Reddick kick), 13:33
- ISU – Rocco Becht 1-yard touchdown run (Kyle Konrardy kick), 8:36
- ISU – Jayden Higgins 12-yard pass from Rocco Becht (PAT blocked), 0:51

Fourth quarter

- UCF – RJ Harvey 1-yard touchdown run (Grant Reddick kick), 11:38
- ISU – Kyle Konrardy 30-yard field goal, 8:53
- ISU – Rocco Becht 1-yard touchdown run (Becht run for Two-Point Conversion), 0:30

Statistics	UCF	ISU
First downs	14	28
Total yards	416	530
Rushing yards	354	256
Passing yards	62	274
Passing: Comp–Att–Int	8–20–2	20–46–2
Time of possession	22:32	37:28

Team	Category	Player	Statistics
UCF	Passing	Jacurri Brown	8/20, 62 yards, 2 INT
UCF	Rushing	RJ Harvey	25 carries, 196 yards, 2TD
UCF	Receiving	Kobe Hudson	3 receptions, 26 yards
Iowa State	Passing	Rocco Becht	20/46, 274 yards, 1 TD, 2 INT
Iowa State	Rushing	Rocco Becht	20 carries, 97 yards, 2 TD
Iowa State	Receiving	Jaylin Noel	8 receptions, 153 yards

=== vs Texas Tech ===
Texas Tech Red Raiders (5–3) vs No. 11т Iowa State Cyclones (7–0) – Game summary

Quarter	1	2	3	4	Total
Red Raiders	10	0	7	6	23
No. 11т Cyclones	3	10	0	9	22

at Jack Trice Stadium • Ames, IA

- Date: November 2, 2024
- Game time: 2:30 p.m.
- Game weather: Cloudy, 53 °F (12 °C), SE 8 mph
- Game attendance: 61,500
- Referee: Henry Johns
- TV announcers (ESPN): Dave Pasch (play-by-play), Dusty Dvoracek (analyst), and Taylor McGregor (sideline)

Game information

First quarter

- TTU – Josh Kelly 35-yard pass from Behren Morton (Gino Garcia kick), 12:16. Red Raiders 7–0. Drive: 7 plays, 72 yards, 2:39.
- ISU – Kyle Konrardy 49-yard field goal, 8:33. Red Raiders 7–3. Drive: 10 plays, 44 yards, 3:43.
- TTU – Gino Garcia 44-yard field goal, 3:51. Red Raiders 10–3. Drive: 10 plays, 49 yards, 4:42.

Second quarter

- ISU – Kyle Konrardy 37-yard field goal, 9:25. Red Raiders 10–6. Drive: 7 plays, 37 yards, 2:58.
- ISU – Jayden Higgins 20-yard pass from Rocco Becht (Kyle Konrardy kick), 0:04. Cyclones 13–10. Drive: 4 plays, 50 yards, 0:26.

Third quarter

- TTU – Josh Kelly 19-yard pass from Behren Morton (Gino Garcia kick), 1:56. Red Raiders 17–13. Drive: 12 plays, 98 yards, 3:49.

Fourth quarter

- ISU – Kyle Konrardy 21-yard field goal, 12:23. Red Raiders 17–16. Drive: 10 plays, 72 yards, 4:33.
- ISU – Carson Brown 44-yard pass from Rocco Becht (pass failed), 2:11. Cyclones 22–17. Drive: 5 plays, 65 yards, 2:20.
- TTU – Tahj Brooks 5-yard run (pass failed), 0:20. Red Raiders 23–22. Drive: 12 plays, 71 yards, 1:47.

Statistics	TTU	ISU
First downs	21	23
Total yards	366	432
Rushing yards	129	133
Passing yards	237	299
Passing: Comp–Att–Int	21–40–2	22–38–1
Time of possession	25:43	34:17

Team	Category	Player	Statistics
Texas Tech	Passing	Behren Morton	21/40, 237 yards, 2 TD, 2 INT
Texas Tech	Rushing	Tahj Brooks	25 carries, 122 yards, TD
Texas Tech	Receiving	Josh Kelly	8 receptions, 127 yards, 2 TD
Iowa State	Passing	Rocco Becht	23/39, 299 yards, 2 TD, INT
Iowa State	Rushing	Abu Sama	13 carries, 74 yards
Iowa State	Receiving	Jayden Higgins	10 receptions, 140 yards, TD

=== at Kansas ===
No. 17 Iowa State Cyclones (7–1) at Kansas Jayhawks (2–6) – Game summary

Quarter	1	2	3	4	Total
No. 17 Cyclones	7	6	7	16	36
Jayhawks	14	17	7	7	45

at Arrowhead Stadium • Kansas City, MO

- Date: November 9, 2024
- Game time: 2:30 p.m.
- Game weather: Sunny, 59 °F (15 °C), S 10 mph
- Game attendance: 51,109
- Referee: Michael Vander Velde
- TV announcers (FS1): Guy Haberman (play-by-play) and Yogi Roth (analyst)

Game information

First quarter

- (9:02) ISU – Noel, Jaylin 27 yd pass from Becht, Rocco (Konrardy, Kyle kick) (Drive: 7 plays, 99 yards, 3:38; Iowa State 7–0)
- (8:13) KU – Grimm, Luke 70 yd pass from Daniels, Jalon (Allen, Tabor kick) (Drive: 2 plays, 74 yards, 0:43; Tied 7–7)
- (0:19) KU – Neal, Devin 13 yd run (Allen, Tabor kick) (Drive: 8 plays, 90 yards, 4:04; Kansas 14–7)

Second quarter

- (10:32) KU – Skinner, Quentin 24 yd pass from Daniels, Jalon (Allen, Tabor kick)(Drive: 6 plays, 73 yards, 3:01; Kansas 21–7)
- (7:06) ISU – Konrardy, Kyle 22 yd field goal (Drive: 10 plays, 71 yards, 3:26; Kansas 21–10)
- (4:43) KU – Daniels, Jalon 2 yd run (Allen, Tabor kick) (Drive: 5 plays, 76 yards, 2:16; Kansas 28–10)
- (1:01) KU – Allen, Tabor 47 yd field goal (Drive: 9 plays, 32 yards, 2:46; Kansas 31–10)
- (0:00) ISU – Konrardy, Kyle 38 yd field goal (Drive: 9 plays, 55 yards, 1:01; Kansas 31–13)

Third quarter

- (6:27) KU – Neal, Devin 10 yd run (Allen, Tabor kick (Drive: 11 plays, 59 yards, 5:39; Kansas 38–13)
- (4:06) ISU – Hansen, Carson 11 yd run (Konrardy, Kyle kick) (Drive: 5 plays, 76 yards, 2:21; Kansas 38–20)

Fourth quarter

- (11:03) ISU – Jackson, Jaylon 27 yd pass from Becht, Rocco (Becht, Rocco rush) (Drive: 6 plays, 80 yards, 1:48; Kansas 38–28)
- (5:458) KU – Dotson, Mello 25 yd interception (Allen, Tabor kick) (Kansas 45–28)
- (2:41) ISU – Noel, Jaylin 18 yd pass from Becht, Rocco (Higgins, Jayden pass) (Drive: 3 plays, 42 yards, 0:42; Kansas 45–36)

Statistics	ISU	KU
First downs	23	25
Total yards	461	532
Rushing yards	78	237
Passing yards	383	295
Passing: Comp–Att–Int	24–38–1	12–24–0
Time of possession	24:43	35:17

Team	Category	Player	Statistics
Iowa State	Passing	Rocco Becht	24/37, 383 yards, 3 TD, INT
Iowa State	Rushing	Carson Hansen	8 carries, 48 yards, TD
Iowa State	Receiving	Jaylin Noel	8 receptions, 167 yards, 2 TD
Kansas	Passing	Jalon Daniels	12/24, 295 yards, 2 TD
Kansas	Rushing	Devin Neal	18 carries, 116 yards, 2 TD
Kansas	Receiving	Quentin Skinner	4 receptions, 135 yards, TD

=== vs Cincinnati ===
Cincinnati Bearcats (5–4) vs Iowa State Cyclones (7–2) – Game summary

Quarter	1	2	3	4	Total
Bearcats	7	3	0	7	17
Cyclones	7	3	10	14	34

at Jack Trice Stadium • Ames, IA

- Date: November 16, 2024
- Game time: 7:00 p.m.
- Game weather: Cloudy • Temperature: 54 °F (12 °C) • Wind: E at 17 miles per hour (27 km/h)
- Game attendance: 52,881
- Referee: Stephen Baron
- TV announcers (FOX): Tim Brando (play-by-play), Devin Gardner (analyst), and Josh Sims (sideline reporter)

Game information

First quarter

- (9:56) CIN – Evan Pryor 12-yard run, Nathan Hawks kick (Drive: 10 plays, 75 yards, 5:04; Cincinnati 7–0)
- (1:53) ISU – Carson Hansen 2-yard run, Kyle Konrardy kick (Drive: 5 plays, 39 yards, 1:52; Tied 7–7)

Second quarter

- (12:18) CIN – Nathan Hawks 29-yard field goal (Drive: 8 plays, 59 yards, 4:28; Cincinnati 10–7)
- (0:08) ISU – Kyle Konrardy 37-yard field goal (Drive: 6 plays, 20 yards, 0:27; Tied 10–10)

Third quarter

- (10:04) ISU – Stevo Klotz 26-yard pass from Rocco Becht, Kyle Konrardy kick (Drive: 9 plays, 76 yards, 4:50; Iowa State 17–10)
- (2:53) ISU – Kyle Konrardy 52-yard field goal (Drive: 9 plays, 38 yards, 3:50; Iowa State 20–10)

Fourth quarter

- (11:44) CIN – Brendan Sorsby 41-yard run, Nathan Hawks kick (Drive: 4 plays, 40 yards, 1:51; Iowa State 20–17)
- (4:04) ISU – Rocco Becht 15-yard run, Kyle Konrardy kick (Drive: 15 plays, 68 yards, 7:33; Iowa State 27–17)
- (1:09) ISU – Abu Sama 27-yard run, Kyle Konrardy kick (Drive: 7 plays, 71 yards, 2:08; Iowa State 34–17)

Statistics	CIN	ISU
First downs	15	21
Total yards	353	386
Rushing yards	287	152
Passing yards	66	234
Passing: Comp–Att–Int	10–18–0	24–35–0
Time of possession	28:12	31:48

Team	Category	Player	Statistics
Cincinnati	Passing	Brendan Sorsby	10/18, 66 yards
Cincinnati	Rushing	Brendan Sorsby	13 carries, 143 yards, TD
Cincinnati	Receiving	Tony Johnson	3 receptions, 43 yards
Iowa State	Passing	Rocco Becht	24/33, 234 yards, TD
Iowa State	Rushing	Abu Sama	12 carries, 52 yards, TD
Iowa State	Receiving	Gabe Burkle	6 receptions, 73 yards

=== at Utah ===
No. 22 Iowa State Cyclones (8–2) at Utah Utes (4–6) – Game summary

Quarter	1	2	3	4	Total
No. 22 Cyclones	7	10	7	7	31
Utes	3	10	0	15	28

at Rice-Eccles Stadium • Salt Lake City, UT

- Date: November 23, 2024
- Game time: 6:30 p.m.
- Game weather: Cloudy, 50 °F (10 °C), SW 7 mph
- Game attendance: 52,152
- Referee: David Alvarez
- TV announcers (FOX): Chris Myers (play-by-play) and Robert Smith (analyst)

Game information

First Quarter

- (9:52) UU - Becker, Cole 34 yd field goal (Drive: 7 plays, 64 yards, 4:09; UU 3–0)
- (3:52) ISU - Higgins, Jayden 7 yd pass from Becht, Rocco (Konrardy, Kyle kick) (Drive: 13 plays, 75 yards, 6:00; ISU 7–3)

Second Quarter

- (11:53) UU - Barton, Lander 87 yd interception (Becker, Cole kick) (UU 10–7)
- (8:05) ISU - Hansen, Carson 8 yd run (Konrardy, Kyle kick) (Drive: 9 plays, 75 yards, 3:48; ISU 14–10)
- (3:32) UU - Becker, Cole 47 yd field goal (Drive: 4 plays, -12 yards, 2:25; ISU 14–13)
- (0:29) ISU - Konrardy, Kyle 35 yd field goal (Drive: 7 plays, 58 yards, 3:03; ISU 17–13)

Third Quarter

- (5:02) ISU - Becht, Rocco 1 yd run (Konrardy, Kyle kick) (Drive: 8 plays, 23 yards, 3:51; ISU 24–13)

Fourth Quarter

- (14:41) UU - Washington, David 0 yd punt return (Lohner, Caleb pass) (ISU 24–21)
- (5:51) UU - Bernard, Micah 1 yd run (Becker, Cole kick) (Drive: 10 plays, 91 yards, 6:24; UU 2824)
- (1:31) ISU - Hansen, Carson 3 yd run (Konrardy, Kyle kick) (Drive: 10 plays, 75 yards, 4:20; ISU 31–28)

Statistics	ISU	UTAH
First downs	25	9
Total yards	405	224
Rushing yards	123	95
Passing yards	282	129
Passing: Comp–Att–Int	21–39–1	13–17–0
Time of possession	35:54	24:06

Team	Category	Player	Statistics
Iowa State	Passing	Rocco Becht	20/38, 256 yards, TD, INT
Iowa State	Rushing	Carson Hansen	14 carries, 57 yards, 2 TD
Iowa State	Receiving	Jayden Higgins	9 receptions, 155 yards, TD
Utah	Passing	Isaac Wilson	8/8, 74 yards
Utah	Rushing	Luke Bottari	4 carries, 47 yards
Utah	Receiving	Daidren Zipperer	4 receptions, 66 yards

=== vs No. 24 Kansas State ===
No. 24 Kansas State Wildcats (8–3) vs No. 18 Iowa State Cyclones (9–2) – Game summary

Quarter	1	2	3	4	Total
No. 24 Wildcats	7	7	7	0	21
No. 18 Cyclones	7	17	0	5	29

at Jack Trice Stadium • Ames, IA

- Date: November 30, 2024
- Game time: 6:30 p.m.
- Game weather: Cloudy, 24 °F (−4 °C), NW 5 MPH
- Game attendance: 56,228
- Referee: Kevin Mar
- TV announcers (FOX): Connor Onion (play-by-play) and Mark Helfrich (analyst)

Game information

First quarter

- (12:24) ISU - Higgins, Jayden 15 yd pass from Becht, Rocco (Konrardy, Kyle kick) (Drive: 6 plays, 27 yards, 2:30; ISU 7–0)
- (5:39) KSU - Brown, Jayce 28 yd pass from Johnson, Avery (Tennant, Chris kick) (Drive: 10 plays, 83 yards, 4:43; Tied 7–7)

Second quarter

- (13:31) ISU - Konrardy, Kyle 41 yd field goal (Drive: 9 plays, 29 yards, 4:11; ISU 10–7)
- (10:05) ISU - Noel, Jaylin 9 yd pass from Becht, Rocco (Konrardy, Kyle kick) (Drive: 5 plays, 30 yards, 2:35; ISU 17–7)
- (5:49) KSU - Brown, Jayce 65 yd pass from Johnson, Avery (Tennant, Chris kick) (Drive: 1 play, 65 yards, 0:12; ISU 17–14)
- (0:43) ISU - Becht, Rocco 5 yd run (Konrardy, Kyle kick) (Drive: 6 plays, 78 yards, 1:04; ISU 24–14)

Third quarter

- (4:41) KSU - Oakley, Garrett 7 yd pass from Johnson, Avery (Tennant, Chris kick) (Drive: 5 plays, 59 yards, 2:15; ISU 24–21)

Fourth quarter

- (13:22) ISU - 0 yd safety (ISU 26–21)
- (6:16) ISU - Konrardy, Kyle 20 yd field goal (Drive: 14 plays, 60 yards, 7:00; ISU 29–21)

Statistics	KSU	ISU
First downs	14	22
Total yards	364	324
Rushing yards	144	187
Passing yards	220	137
Passing: Comp–Att–Int	12–29–0	13–36–0
Time of possession	24:35	35:25

Team	Category	Player	Statistics
Kansas State	Passing	Avery Johnson	12/28, 220 yards, 3 TD
Kansas State	Rushing	DJ Giddens	14 carries, 72 yards
Kansas State	Receiving	Jayce Brown	3 receptions, 106 yards, 2 TD
Iowa State	Passing	Rocco Becht	13/35, 137 yards, 2 TD
Iowa State	Rushing	Abu Sama III	14 carries, 57 yards, 2 TD
Iowa State	Receiving	Jayden Higgins	5 receptions, 53 yards, TD

=== vs No. 15 Arizona State—Big 12 Championship Game ===
2024 Big 12 Championship Game
No. 16 Iowa State Cyclones (10-2, 7-2) at No. 15 Arizona State Sun Devils (10-2, 7-2)

Quarter	1	2	3	4	Total
No. 16 Cyclones	7	3	0	9	19
No. 15 Sun Devils	10	14	21	0	45

at AT&T Stadium • Arlington, Texas

- Date: December 7th, 2024
- Game time: 11:00 CST
- TV announcers (ABC/ESPN Radio): Joe Tessitore (play-by-play), Jesse Palmer (color analyst), and Katie George (sideline reporter)/Mike Couzens (play-by-play), Max Starks (analyst), and Mike Peasley (sideline reporter)

Statistics	ISU	ASU
First downs	23	17
Total yards	341	464
Rushing yards	127	245
Passing yards	214	219
Turnovers	3	0
Time of possession	29:33	30:27

Team	Category	Player	Statistics
Iowa State	Passing	Rocco Becht	21/35, 214 yards, 2 TD, INT
Iowa State	Rushing	Carson Hansen	10 carries, 52 yards
Iowa State	Receiving	Jayden Higgins	7 receptions, 115 yards
Arizona State	Passing	Sam Leavitt	12/17, 219 yards, 3 TD
Arizona State	Rushing	Cam Skattebo	16 carries, 170 yards, 2 TD
Arizona State	Receiving	Melquan Stovall	4 receptions, 91 yards

=== vs No. 13 Miami (FL)—Pop-Tarts Bowl ===
2024 Pop-Tarts Bowl
No. 18 Iowa State Cyclones (10-3) vs No. 13 Miami Hurricanes (10-2)

Quarter	1	2	3	4	Total
No. 18 Cyclones	21	7	7	7	42
No. 13 Hurricanes	14	17	7	3	41

at Camping World Stadium • Orlando, Florida

- Date: Saturday, December 28, 2024
- Game time: 2:30 p.m. CST
- Game weather: Cloudy • Temperature: 75 °F (24 °C) • Wind: 14 mph (23 km/h) southeast
- Game attendance: 38,650
- Referee: Jeff Heaser
- TV announcers (ABC/ESPN Radio): Tom Hart (play-by-play), Jordan Rodgers (analyst), and Cole Cubelic (sideline)/Mike Couzens (play-by-play) and Max Starks (analyst)
- Box score

Game information

First Quarter

- (11:23) ISU – Gabe Burkle 9 yard pass from Rocco Becht, Kyle Konrardy kick (Drive: 7 plays, 22 yards, 3:30; Iowa State 7–0)
- (11:10) MIA – Damien Martinez 75 yard run, Andres Borregales kick (Drive: 1 plays, 75 yards, 0:13; Tied 7–7)
- (8:34) ISU – Carson Hansen 30 yard run, Kyle Konrardy kick (Drive: 6 plays, 75 yards, 2:36; Iowa State 14–7)
- (4:12) MIA – Jacolby George 4 yard pass from Cam Ward, Andres Borregales kick (Drive: 7 plays, 75 yards, 4:22; Tied 14–14)
- (2:23) ISU – Carson Hansen 1 yard run, Kyle Konrardy kick (Drive: 6 plays, 65 yards, 1:49; Iowa State 21–14)

Second Quarter

- (13:30) MIA – Joshisa Trader 40 yard pass from Cam Ward, Andres Borregales kick (Drive: 9 plays, 75 yards, 3:50; Tied 21–21)
- (10:43) ISU – Carson Hansen 13 yard pass from Rocco Becht, Kyle Konrardy kick (Drive: 7 plays, 75 yards, 2:50; Iowa State 28–21)
- (9:25) MIA – Elijah Arroyo 33 yard pass from Cam Ward, Andres Borregales kick (Drive: 3 plays, 72 yards, 1:18; Tied 28–28)
- (0:16) MIA – Andres Borregales 30 yard field goal (Drive: 12 plays, 55 yards, 3:30; Miami (FL) 31–28)

Third Quarter

- (8:09) MIA – Mark Fletcher Jr. 1 yard run, Andres Borregales kick (Drive: 10 plays, 71 yards, 6:01; Miami (FL) 38–28)
- (2:20) ISU – Jaylin Noel 4 yard pass from Rocco Becht, Kyle Konrardy kick (Drive: 10 plays, 75 yards, 5:49; Miami (FL) 38–35)

Fourth Quarter

- (9:40) MIA – Andres Borregales 21 yard field goal (Drive: 14 plays, 72 yards, 7:40; Miami (FL) 41–35)
- (0:56) ISU – Rocco Becht 1 yard run, Kyle Konrardy kick (Drive: 15 plays, 84 yards, 5:38; Iowa State 42–41)

Statistics	ISU	MIA
First downs	24	24
Total yards	415	524
Rushing yards	145	308
Passing yards	270	216
Passing: Comp–Att–Int	22–36–0	17–33–1
Time of possession	27:41	32:19

Team	Category	Player	Statistics
Iowa State	Passing	Rocco Becht	22/36, 270 yards, 3 TD
Iowa State	Rushing	Carson Hansen	16 carries, 82 yards, 2 TD
Iowa State	Receiving	Jaylin Noel	8 receptions, 117 yards, TD
Miami (FL)	Passing	Cam Ward	12/19, 190 yards, 3 TD
Miami (FL)	Rushing	Damien Martinez	14 carries, 179 yards, TD
Miami (FL)	Receiving	Elijah Arroyo	4 receptions, 64 yards, TD

== Coaching staff ==
Iowa State Cyclones
Name	Position	Consecutive season at Iowa State in current position	Previous position	ISU profile
Matt Campbell	Head coach	9th	Toledo – Head coach (2012–2015)	
Jon Heacock	Defensive coordinator	9th	Toledo – Assistant head coach / defensive coordinator / safeties (2014–2015)	
Taylor Mouser	Offensive coordinator / tight ends	1st	Iowa State – Tight ends / associate head coach (2023)	
Deon Broomfield	Passing game coordinator / safeties	4th	Houston Texans – Defensive assistant (2020)	
Ryan Clanton	Run game coordinator / offensive line	1st	Iowa State – Offensive line (2023)	
Colby Kratch	Linebackers	1st	North Texas – Linebackers (2023)	
Noah Pauley	Pass game coordinator/wide receivers	1st	Iowa State – Wide receivers (2023)	
Hank Poteat	Cornerbacks	2nd	Wisconsin – Cornerbacks (2021–2022)	
Eli Rasheed	Defensive line	9th	Toledo – Defensive line (2009–2015)	
Tyler Roehl	Assistant head coach/running backs	1st	North Dakota State – Offensive coordinator/tight ends/fullbacks (2019–2023)	
Jake Waters	Quarterbacks	1st	Iowa State – Senior quality control/offense (2021–2023)	

== Rankings ==
Ranking movements Legend: ██ Increase in ranking ██ Decrease in ranking — = Not ranked RV = Received votes т = Tied with team above or below
	Week																
Poll	Pre	1	2	3	4	5	6	7	8	9	10	11	12	13	14	15	Final
AP	RV	RV	21	20	18	16	11т	9	10	11т	17	RV	22	17	16	18	15
Coaches	RV	RV	23	21	19	16	13	12	10	10	18	25	21	17	16	19	15
CFP	Not released										17	—	22	18	16	18	Not released
