= 2022 Iowa State Cyclones football team =

American college football season

2022 Iowa State Cyclones football
- Conference: Big 12 Conference
- Record: 4–8 (1–8 Big 12)
- Head coach: Matt Campbell (7th season)
- Offensive coordinator: Tom Manning (6th season)
- Offensive scheme: Pro spread
- Defensive coordinator: Jon Heacock (7th season)
- Base defense: 3-high safety
- Captains: Trevor Downing; Xavier Hutchinson; Anthony Johnson Jr.; O'Rien Vance
- Home stadium: Jack Trice Stadium

2022 Big 12 Conference football standings
	Conf.			Overall
Team	W		L	W		L
No. 2 TCU y^	9	–	0	13	–	2
No. 14 Kansas State y$	7	–	2	10	–	4
No. 25 Texas	6	–	3	8	–	5
Texas Tech	5	–	4	8	–	5
Oklahoma State	4	–	5	7	–	6
Baylor	4	–	5	6	–	7
Oklahoma	3	–	6	6	–	7
Kansas	3	–	6	6	–	7
West Virginia	3	–	6	5	–	7
Iowa State	1	–	8	4	–	8
Championship: Kansas State 31, TCU 28 ^{OT}
^ – College Football Playoff participant; $ – Conference champion; y – Championship game participant; Rankings from AP Poll

The 2022 Iowa State Cyclones football team represented Iowa State University as a member of Big 12 Conference during the 2022 NCAA Division I FBS football season. Led by seventh-year head coach Matt Campbell, the Cyclones compiled an overall record of 4–8 with a mark of 1–8 in conference play, placing last out of ten teams in the Big 12. The team played home games at Jack Trice Stadium in Ames, Iowa.

== Schedule ==
Iowa State and the Big 12 announced the 2022 football schedule on December 1, 2021.

Date	Time	Opponent	Site	TV	Result	Attendance
September 3	1:00 p.m.	Southeast Missouri State*	Jack Trice Stadium; Ames, IA	ESPN+	W 42–10	57,142
September 10	3:00 p.m.	at Iowa*	Kinnick Stadium; Iowa City, IA (rivalry)	BTN	W 10–7	69,250
September 17	1:00 p.m.	Ohio*	Jack Trice Stadium; Ames, IA	ESPN+	W 43–10	58,138
September 24	11:00 a.m.	No. 17 Baylor	Jack Trice Stadium; Ames, IA	ESPN2	L 24–31	58,069
October 1	2:30 p.m.	at Kansas	David Booth Kansas Memorial Stadium; Lawrence, KS	ESPN2	L 11–14	47,233
October 8	6:30 p.m.	No. 20 Kansas State	Jack Trice Stadium; Ames, IA (rivalry)	ESPNU	L 9–10	60,561
October 15	11:00 a.m.	at No. 22 Texas	Darrell K Royal–Texas Memorial Stadium; Austin, TX	ABC	L 21–24	100,072
October 29	11:00 a.m.	Oklahoma	Jack Trice Stadium; Ames, IA	FS1	L 13–27	58,716
November 5	2:30 p.m.	West Virginia^{†}	Jack Trice Stadium; Ames, IA	ESPN+	W 31–14	56,109
November 12	2:30 p.m.	at Oklahoma State	Boone Pickens Stadium; Stillwater, OK	ESPNU	L 14–20	55,509
November 19	6:00 p.m.	Texas Tech	Jack Trice Stadium; Ames, IA	FS1	L 10–14	52,676
November 26	3:00 p.m.	at No. 4 TCU	Amon G. Carter Stadium; Fort Worth, TX	FOX	L 14–62	44,846
*Non-conference game; ^{†}Homecoming; Rankings from AP Poll (and CFP Rankings, after November 1) - Released prior to game; All times are in Central time

== Rankings ==
Ranking movements Legend: ██ Increase in ranking ██ Decrease in ranking — = Not ranked RV = Received votes
	Week															
Poll	Pre	1	2	3	4	5	6	7	8	9	10	11	12	13	14	Final
AP	—	—	RV	—	—	—	—	—	—	—	—	—	—	—	—	—
Coaches	RV	—	RV	RV	RV	—	—	—	—	—	—	—	—	—	—	—
CFP	Not released									—	—	—	—	—	—	Not released

== Preseason ==
=== Big 12 preseason media poll ===
The Big 12 preseason media poll was released on July 7, 2022. Iowa State was picked to finish sixth in the conference.

=== Award watch lists ===
Listed in the order that they were released

Award	Player	Position	Year
Lott Trophy	Will McDonald IV	DE	Sr.
Maxwell Award	Xavier Hutchinson	WR	Sr.
Bednarik Award	Will McDonald IV	DE	Sr.
Biletnikoff Award	Xavier Hutchinson	WR	Sr.
Outland Trophy	Trevor Downing	C	Sr.
Bronko Nagurski Trophy	Will McDonald IV	DE	Sr.
Wuerffel Trophy	Anthony Johnson Jr.	SAF	Sr.
Walter Camp Award	Xavier Hutchinson	WR	Sr.
	Will McDonald IV	DE	Sr.
Rotary Lombardi Award	Trevor Downing	C	Sr.
	Will McDonald IV	DE	Sr.

=== Preseason Big-12 awards ===
2022 Preseason All-Big 12 teams

Position	Player	Class
Offense
FB	Jared Rus	RS Senior
WR	Xavier Hutchinson	RS Senior
Defense
DL	Will McDonald IV	RS Senior

== Game summaries ==
=== Vs. Southeast Missouri ===
Southeast Missouri State (0–0) vs. Iowa State Cyclones (0–0)

Quarter	1	2	3	4	Total
Southeast Missouri State	0	10	0	0	10
Iowa State	7	14	7	14	42

at Jack Trice Stadium • Ames, IA

- Date: Saturday, September 3, 2022
- Game time: 1:00 p.m. CDT
- Game weather: sunny • Temperature: 74°F
- Game attendance: 57,142
- Referee: Derek Anderson
- TV announcers (ESPN+): Shawn Kenney (play-by-play) and Todd Doxzon (analyst)

Game information

First Quarter

- (02:29) ISU – Xavier Hutchinson 33 Yd pass from Hunter Dekkers (Jace Gilbert Kick) (Drive: 8 plays, 85 yards, 4:05; ISU 7–0)

Second Quarter

- (14:53) ISU – Xavier Hutchinson 33 Yd pass from Hunter Dekkers (Jace Gilbert Kick) (Drive: 6 plays, 75 yards, 1:03; ISU 14–0)
- (07:54) ISU – Xavier Hutchinson 8 Yd pass from Hunter Dekkers (Jace Gilbert Kick) (Drive: 11 plays, 90 yards, 4:06; ISU 21–0)
- (01:59) SEMO– Damoriea Vick 11 Yd pass from Paxton DeLaurent (DC Pippin Kick) (Drive: 11 plays, 90 yards, 4:06; ISU 21–7)
- (00:28) SEMO – DC Pippin 23 Yd Field Goal (Drive: 4 plays, 2 yards, 0:58; ISU 21–10)

Third Quarter

- (09:58) ISU – DeShawn Hanika 9 Yd pass from Hunter Dekkers (Jace Gilbert Kick) (Drive: 9 plays, 80 yards, 4:57; ISU 28–10)

Fourth Quarter

- (13:29) ISU – Jirehl Brock 1 Yd Run (Jace Gilbert Kick) (Drive: 10 plays, 84 yards, 4:27; ISU 35–10)
- (06:06) ISU – Deon Silas 1 Yd Run (Jace Gilbert Kick) (Drive: 11 plays, 77 yards, 6:29; ISU 42–10)

Statistics	SEMO	ISU
First downs	15	26
Total yards	320	469
Rushes/yards	22/98	36/176
Passing yards	222	293
Passing: Comp–Att–Int	19–38–1	25–31–1
Turnovers	1	1
Time of possession	27:25	32:35

Team	Category	Player	Statistics
SEMO	Passing	Paxton DeLaurent	19–38, 222 YDS, 1 TD, 1 INT
SEMO	Rushing	Paxton DeLaurent	12 CAR, 74 YDS
SEMO	Receiving	Ryan Flournoy	3 REC, 56 YDS, 0 TD
Iowa State	Passing	Hunter Dekkers	25–31, 293 yards, 4TD, 1 INT
Iowa State	Rushing	Jirehl Brock	16 CAR, 104 YDS, 1 TD
Iowa State	Receiving	Xavier Hutchinson	8 REC, 128 YDS, 3 TD

=== At Iowa ===
Iowa State Cyclones (1–0) vs. Iowa Hawkeyes (1–0)

Quarter	1	2	3	4	Total
Iowa State	0	3	0	7	10
Iowa	7	0	0	0	7

at Kinnick Stadium • Iowa City, Iowa

- Date: Saturday, September 10, 2022
- Game time: 3:00 p.m. CDT
- Game weather: Cloudy • Temperature: 72
- Game attendance: 69,250
- Referee: Tuta Salaam
- TV announcers (BTN): Brandon Gaudin (play-by-play), Anthony Herron (analyst), and Rick Pizzo (sideline)

Game information

First Quarter

- (12:21) UofI – Leshon Williams 9 Yd Run (Aaron Blom Kick) (Drive: 2 plays, 16 yards, 2:39; UofI 7–0)

Second Quarter

- (03:45) ISU – Jace Gilbert 22 Yd Field Goal (Drive: 14 plays, 76 yards, 5:06; UofI 7–3)

Fourth Quarter

- (08:27) ISU – Xavier Hutchinson 8 Yd pass from Hunter Dekkers (Jace Gilbert Kick) (Drive: 21 plays, 99 yards, 11:49; ISU 10–7)

Statistics	ISU	UofI
First downs	21	11
Total yards	313	150
Rushes/yards	41/129	25/58
Passing yards	184	92
Passing: Comp–Att–Int	25–38–2	12–27–1
Turnovers	3	3
Time of possession	38:15	21:45

Team	Category	Player	Statistics
Iowa State	Passing	Hunter Dekkers	25-38, 184 YDS, 1 TD, 2 INT
Iowa State	Rushing	Jirehl Brock	27 CAR, 100 YDS
Iowa State	Receiving	Xavier Hutchinson	11 REC, 98 YDS, 1 TD
Iowa	Passing	Spencer Petras	12-26, 92 YDS, 1 INT
Iowa	Rushing	Leshon Williams	4 CAR, 34 YDS, 1 TD
Iowa	Receiving	Sam LaPorta	8 REC, 55 YDS

=== Vs. Ohio ===
Ohio Bobcats (1–1) vs. Iowa State Cyclones (2–0)

Quarter	1	2	3	4	Total
Ohio	0	3	7	0	10
Iowa State	14	16	7	6	43

at Jack Trice Stadium • Ames, IA

- Date: Saturday, September 17, 2022
- Game time: 1:00 p.m. CDT
- Game weather: Cloudy • Temperature: 74
- Game attendance: 58,138
- Referee: Ron Hudson
- TV announcers (ESPN+): Chuckie Kempf (play-by-play), Sage Rosenfels (analyst), and Tori Petry (sideline)

Game information

First Quarter

- (10:44) ISU – Hunter Dekkers 6 Yd Run (Jace Gilbert Kick) (Drive: 11 plays, 69 yards, 4:11; ISU 7–0)
- (01:46) ISU – DeShawn Hanika 12 Yd pass from Hunter Dekkers (Jace Gilbert Kick) (Drive: 8 plays, 55 yards, 2:53; ISU 14–0)

Second Quarter

- (14:57) ISU – Jace Gilbert 19 Yd Field Goal (Drive: 4 plays, 7 yards, 1:01; ISU 17–0)
- (13:07) ISU – Deon Silas 3 Yd Run (Jace Gilbert Kick) (Drive: 5 plays, 51 yards, 1:38; ISU 24–0)
- (03:35) OU – Nathanial Vakos 45 Yd Field Goal (Drive: 11 plays, 49 yards, 5:29; ISU 24–3)
- (00:24) ISU – Sean Shaw Jr. 15 Yd pass from Hunter Dekkers (Jace Gilbert PAT blocked) (Drive: 10 plays, 75 yards, 3:11; ISU 30–3)

Third Quarter

- (08:22) ISU – Xavier Hutchinson 13 Yd pass from Hunter Dekkers (Jace Gilbert Kick) (Drive: 2 plays, 13 yards, 0:10; ISU 37–3)
- (03:44) OU – Tyler Foster 1 Yd pass from Kurtis Rourke (Nathanial Vakos Kick) (Drive: 9 plays, 51 yards, 4:38; ISU 37–10)

Fourth Quarter

- (08:14) ISU – Jace Gilbert 21 Yd Field Goal (Drive: 4 plays, 4 yards, 1:20; ISU 40–10)
- (01:29) ISU – Jace Gilbert 39 Yd Field Goal (Drive: 10 plays, 47 yards, 5:31; ISU 43–10)

Statistics	OHIO	ISU
First downs	12	22
Total yards	233	463
Rushes/yards	22/24	32/163
Passing yards	209	300
Passing: Comp–Att–Int	23-40-2	32-42-0
Turnovers	4	1
Time of possession	28:58	31:02

Team	Category	Player	Statistics
OHIO	Passing	Kurtis Rourke	20-33, 194 YDS, 1 TD, 2 INT
OHIO	Rushing	Nolan McCormick	7 CAR, 43 YDS
OHIO	Receiving	Miles Cross	4 REC, 48 YDS
Iowa State	Passing	Hunter Dekkers	28-36, 268 YDS, 3 TD
Iowa State	Rushing	Jirehl Brock	7 CAR, 76 YDS
Iowa State	Receiving	Xavier Hutchinson	9 REC, 93 YDS, 1 TD

=== Vs. No. 17 Baylor ===
No. 17 Baylor Bears (2–1) vs. Iowa State Cyclones (3–0)

Quarter	1	2	3	4	Total
Baylor	7	10	7	7	31
Iowa State	7	7	0	10	24

at Jack Trice Stadium • Ames, IA

- Date: Saturday, September 24, 2022
- Game time: 11:00 p.m. CDT
- Game weather: Sunny • Temperature: 70
- Game attendance: 58,069
- Referee: Michael Vandervelde
- TV announcers (ESPN2): Tiffany Greene (play-by-play), Rocky Boiman (analyst), and Dawn Davenport (sideline)

Game information

First Quarter

- (08:40) BU – Ben Sims 12 Yd pass from Blake Shapen (John Mayers Kick) (Drive: 12 plays, 77 yards, 6:20; BU 7–0)
- (02:55) ISU – Jirehl Brock 2 Yd pass from Hunter Dekkers (Jace Gilbert Kick) (Drive: 12 plays, 75 yards, 5:45; BU 7–7)

Second Quarter

- (12:27) BU – John Mayers 24 Yd Field Goal (Drive: 11 plays, 68 yards, 5:28; BU 10–7)
- (07:09) BU – Dillon Doyle 1 Yd pass from Blake Shapen (John Mayers Kick) (Drive: 9 plays, 70 yards, 3:54; BU 17–7)
- (00:46) ISU – Dimitri Stanley 24 Yd pass from Hunter Dekkers (Jace Gilbert Kick) (Drive: 8 plays, 63 yards, 2:53; BU 17–14)

Third Quarter

- (06:05) BU – Richard Reese 19 Yd Run (John Mayers Kick) (Drive: 10 plays, 93 yards, 5:06; BU 24–14)

Fourth Quarter

- (09:37) BU – Gavin Holmes 38 Yd pass from Blake Shapen (John Mayers Kick) (Drive: 4 plays, 64 yards, 1:42; BU 31–14)
- (07:16) ISU – Jirehl Brock 37 Yd Run (Jace Gilbert Kick) (Drive: 7 plays, 75 yards, 2:21; BU 31–21)
- (00:55) ISU – Jace Gilbert 28 Yd Field Goal (Drive: 10 plays, 71 yards, 1:39; BU 31–21)

Statistics	BU	ISU
First downs	23	17
Total yards	361	350
Rushes/yards	42/123	27/66
Passing yards	238	284
Passing: Comp–Att–Int	19-26-0	23-36-2
Turnovers	0	2
Time of possession	34:39	25:21

Team	Category	Player	Statistics
Baylor	Passing	Blake Shapen	19-26, 238 YDS, 3 TD
Baylor	Rushing	Richard Reese	21 CAR, 78 YDS, 1 TD
Baylor	Receiving	Gavin Holmes	3 REC, 92 YDS, 1 TD
Iowa State	Passing	Hunter Dekkers	23-36, 284 YDS, 2 TD, 2 INT
Iowa State	Rushing	Jirehl Brock	14 CAR, 73 YDS, 1 TD
Iowa State	Receiving	Jaylin Noel	7 REC, 120 YDS

=== At Kansas ===
Iowa State Cyclones (3–1) vs. Kansas Jayhawks (4–0)

Quarter	1	2	3	4	Total
Iowa State	0	8	3	0	11
Kansas	0	14	0	0	14

at David Booth Kansas Memorial Stadium • Lawrence, KS

- Date: Saturday, October 1, 2022
- Game time: 2:30 p.m. CDT
- Game weather: Sunny • Temperature: 76
- Game attendance: 47,233
- Referee: Kevin Mar
- TV announcers (ESPN2): Brian Custer (play-by-play), Dustin Fox (analyst), and Lauren Sisler (sideline)

Game information

Second Quarter

- (11:30) KU – Daniel Hishaw Jr. 4 Yd Run (Jacob Borcila Kick) (Drive: 7 plays, 79 yards, 3:59; KU 7–0)
- (05:25) KU – Jalon Daniels 2 Yd Run (Jacob Borcila Kick) (Drive: 4 plays, 19 yards, 2:31; KU 14–0)
- (02:51) ISU – Easton Dean 9 Yd pass from Hunter Dekkers (Blake Clark Run for Two-Point Conversion) (Drive: 6 plays, 75 yards, 2:34; KU 14–8)

Third Quarter

- (05:27) ISU – Jace Gilbert 35 Yd Field Goal (Drive: 12 plays, 62 yards, 5:25; KU 14–11)

Statistics	ISU	KU
First downs	20	10
Total yards	303	213
Rushes/yards	31/16	31/112
Passing yards	287	101
Passing: Comp–Att–Int	30–48–1	8–15–0
Turnovers	2	1
Time of possession	35:02	24:51

Team	Category	Player	Statistics
Iowa State	Passing	Hunter Dekkers	30-48, 287 YDS, 1 TD, 1 INT
Iowa State	Rushing	Deon Silas	12 CAR, 29 YDS
Iowa State	Receiving	Xavier Hutchinson	13 REC, 101 YDS
Kansas	Passing	Jalon Daniels	7-14, 93 YDS
Kansas	Rushing	Devin Neal	12 CAR, 75 YDS
Kansas	Receiving	Luke Grimm	4 REC, 46 YDS

=== Vs. No. 20 Kansas State ===
No. 20 Wildcats (4–1) vs. Iowa State Cyclones (3–2)

Quarter	1	2	3	4	Total
No. 20 Kansas State	7	0	0	3	10
Iowa State	3	3	3	0	9

at Jack Trice Stadium • Ames, IA

- Date: Saturday, October 8, 2022
- Game time: 6:30 p.m. CDT
- Game weather: Clear • Temperature: 60 °F (16 °C) • Wind: SW 12 MPH
- Game attendance: 60,561
- Referee: Kevin Boatman
- TV announcers (ESPNU): Clay Matvick (play-by-play), Rocky Boiman (analyst), and Dawn Davenport (reporter)

Game information

First Quarter

- (12:23) KSU – Phillip Brooks 81 Yd pass from Adrian Martinez (Chris Tennant Kick) (Drive: 3 plays, 86 yards, 0:54; KSU 7–0)
- (09:22) ISU – Jace Gilbert 35 Yd Field Goal (Drive: 8 plays, 74 yards, 2:54; KSU 7–3)

Second Quarter

- (14:47) ISU – Jace Gilbert 44 Yd Field Goal (Drive: 16 plays, 69 yards, 1:01; KSU 7–6)

Third Quarter

- (00:48) ISU – Jace Gilbert 43 Yd Field Goal (Drive: 12 plays, 55 yards, 5:29; ISU 9–7)

Fourth Quarter

- (07:14) KSU – Chris Tennant 30 Yd Field Goal (Drive: 10 plays, 45 yards, 5:03; KSU 10–9)

Statistics	KSU	ISU
First downs	16	13
Total yards	388	276
Rushes/yards	38-131	24-178
Passing yards	257	198
Passing: Comp–Att–Int	13-20-0	22-28-0
Turnovers	1	0
Time of possession	30:22	29:38

Team	Category	Player	Statistics
Kansas State	Passing	Adrian Martinez	12-19, 246 YDS, 1 TD
Kansas State	Rushing	Adrian Martinez	19 CAR, 77 YDS
Kansas State	Receiving	Phillip Brooks	4 REC, 119 YDS, TD
Iowa State	Passing	Hunter Dekkers	22-38, 198 YDS
Iowa State	Rushing	Jirehl Brock	13 CAR, 33 YDS
Iowa State	Receiving	Xavier Hutchinson	8 REC, 100 YDS

=== At No. 22 Texas ===
Iowa State Cyclones (3–3) vs. Texas Longhorns (4–2)

Quarter	1	2	3	4	Total
Iowa State	7	0	7	7	21
Texas	0	14	3	7	24

at Darrell K Royal–Texas Memorial Stadium • Austin, TX

- Date: Saturday, October 15, 2022
- Game time: 11:00 a.m. CDT
- Game weather: Sunny • Temperature: 81 °F (27 °C) • Wind: N 6 miles per hour (9.7 km/h)
- Game attendance: 100,072
- Referee: Tuta Salaam
- TV announcers (ABC): Mark Jones (play-by-play), Robert Griffin III (analyst), and Quint Kessenich (sideline)

Game information

First Quarter

- (00:57) ISU – Jaylin Noel 5 Yd pass from Hunter Dekkers (Jace Gilbert Kick) (Drive: 11 plays, 84 yards, 5:28; ISU 7–0)

Second Quarter

- (05:48) UT – Xavier Worthy 12 Yd pass from Quinn Ewers (Bert Auburn Kick) (Drive: 9 plays, 80 yards, 3:20; Tied 7–7)
- (00:13) UT – Jordan Whittington 5 Yd pass from Quinn Ewers (Bert Auburn Kick) (Drive: 9 plays, 80 yards, 3:28; UT 14–7)

Third Quarter

- (10:07) UT – Bert Auburn 31 Yd Field Goal (Drive: 13 plays, 75 yards, 4:43; UT 17–7)
- (04:27) ISU – Jaylin Noel 54 Yd pass from Hunter Dekkers (Jace Gilbert Kick) (Drive: 2 plays, 62 yards, 0:37; UT 17–14)

Fourth Quarter

- (10:58) ISU – Hunter Dekkers 11 Yd run (Jace Gilbert Kick) (Drive: 13 plays, 73 yards, 5:39; ISU 21–17)
- (04:43) UT – Xavier Worthy 3 Yd pass from Quinn Ewers (Bert Auburn Kick) (Drive: 11 plays, 75 yards, 6:15; UT 24–21)

Statistics	ISU	UT
First downs	20	23
Total yards	403	363
Rushes/yards	28/74	43/191
Passing yards	329	172
Passing: Comp–Att–Int	25–36–1	17–26–0
Turnovers	2	0
Time of possession	28:43	31:17

Team	Category	Player	Statistics
Iowa State	Passing	Hunter Dekkers	25-36, 329 YDS, 2 TD, 1 INT
Iowa State	Rushing	Hunter Dekkers	8 CAR, 30 YDS, 1 TD
Iowa State	Receiving	Xavier Hutchinson	10 REC, 154 YDS
Texas	Passing	Quinn Ewers	17-26, 172 YDS, 3 TD
Texas	Rushing	Bijan Robinson	28 CAR, 135 YDS
Texas	Receiving	Xavier Worthy	8 REC, 72 YDS, 2 TD

=== Vs. Oklahoma ===
Oklahoma Sooners (4-3) vs. Iowa State Cyclones (3-4)

Quarter	1	2	3	4	Total
Oklahoma	3	10	7	7	27
Iowa State	3	3	0	7	13

at Jack Trice Stadium • Ames, IA

- Date: Saturday, October 29, 2022
- Game time: 11:00 a.m. CDT
- Game weather: Sunny • Temperature: 66
- Game attendance: 58,716
- Referee: Steve Baron
- TV announcers (FS1): Noah Eagle (play-by-play) and Mark Helfrich (analyst)

Game information

First Quarter

- (6:31) OU - Zach Schmit 41 Yd Field Goal (Drive: 6 plays, 22 yards, 2:01; OU 3-0)
- (2:08) ISU - Jace Gilbert 27 Yd Field Goal (Drive: 11 plays, 66 yards, 4:23; Tied 3-3)

Second Quarter

- (12:23) OU - Zach Schmit 2 Yd pass from Michael Turk (Zach Schmit Kick) (Drive: 15 plays, 85 yards, 4:38; OU 10-3)
- (6:30) OU - Zach Schmit 34 Yd Field Goal (Drive: 14 plays, 48 yards, 5:31; OU 13-3)
- (0:45) ISU - Jace Gilbert 43 Yd Field Goal (Drive: 7 plays, 25 yards, 1:10; OU 13-6)

Third Quarter

- (4:18) OU - Jalil Farooq 41 Yd pass from Dillon Gabriel (Zach Schmit Kick) (Drive: 8 plays, 78 yards, 2:47; OU 20-6)

Fourth Quarter

- (10:29) ISU - Jaylin Noel 15 Yd pass from Hunter Dekkers (Drake Nettles Kick) (Drive: 12 plays, 53 yards, 4:53; OU 20-13)
- (4:36) OU - Eric Gray 4 Yd Run (Zach Schmit Kick) (Drive: 2 plays, 2 yards, 0:48; OU 27-13)

Statistics	OU	ISU
First downs	18	20
Total yards	332	374
Rushes/yards	47-182	27-66
Passing yards	150	308
Passing: Comp-Att-Int	16-27-0	37-57-3
Turnovers	1	3
Time of possession	29:15	30:45

Team	Category	Player	Statistics
Oklahoma	Passing	Dillon Gabriel	15-26, 148 YDS, 1 TD
Oklahoma	Rushing	Eric Gray	20 CAR, 101 YDS, 1 TD
Oklahoma	Receiving	Jalil Farooq	4 REC, 74 YDS, 1 TD
Iowa State	Passing	Hunter Dekkers	37-57, 308 YDS, 1 TD, 3 INT
Iowa State	Rushing	Hunter Dekkers	4 CAR, 31 YDS
Iowa State	Receiving	Dimitri Stanley	6 REC, 90 YDS

=== Vs. West Virginia ===
West Virginia Mountaineers (3-5) vs. Iowa State Cyclones (3-5)

Quarter	1	2	3	4	Total
West Virginia	0	7	0	7	14
Iowa State	3	7	0	21	31

at Jack Trice Stadium • Ames, IA

- Date: Saturday, November 5, 2022
- Game time: 2:30 p.m. CDT
- Game weather: Sunny • Temperature: 48
- Game attendance: 56,109
- Referee: Scott Campbell
- TV announcers (ESPN+): Mark Neely(play-by-play), Chad Brown (analyst), and Shane Sparks (sideline)

Game information

First Quarter

- (1:47) ISU - Jace Gilbert 30 Yd Field Goal (Drive: 8 plays, 45 yards, 3:06; ISU 3-0)

Second Quarter

- (7:51) ISU - DeShawn Hanika 16 Yd pass from Hunter Dekkers (Jace Gilbert Kick) (Drive: 13 plays, 86 yards, 7:02; ISU 10-0)
- (0:34) WVU - Bryce Ford-Wheaton 25 Yd pass from JT Daniels (Casey Legg Kick) (Drive: 8 plays, 68 yards, 2:49; ISU 10-7)

Fourth Quarter

- (13:24) ISU - Xavier Hutchinson 24 Yd pass from Hunter Dekkers (Drake Nettles Kick) (Drive: 8 plays, 94 yards, 2:58; ISU 17-7)
- (8:31) ISU - Cartevious Norton 5 Yd Run (Jace Gilbert Kick) (Drive: 7 plays, 64 yards, 4:11; ISU 24-7)
- (3:52) ISU - Cartevious Norton 3 Yd Run (Drake Nettles Kick) (Drive: 4 plays, 34 yards, 2:48; ISU 31-7)
- (1:04) WVU - Sam James 8 Yd pass from Garrett Greene (Casey Legg Kick) (Drive: 8 plays, 75 yards, 2:48; ISU 31-14)

Statistics	WVU	ISU
First downs	11	26
Total yards	200	391
Rushes/yards	22-76	38-172
Passing yards	124	219
Passing: Comp-Att-Int	12-27-1	24-36-0
Turnovers	1	0
Time of possession	21:45	38:15

Team	Category	Player	Statistics
West Virginia	Passing	JT Daniels	8-22, 81 YDS, 1 TD, 1 INT
West Virginia	Rushing	Justin Johnson Jr.	12 CAR, 48 YDS
West Virginia	Receiving	Bryce Ford-Wheaton	3 REC, 38 YDS, 1 TD
Iowa State	Passing	Hunter Dekkers	24-36, 219 YDS, 2 TD
Iowa State	Rushing	Deon Silas	6 CAR, 77 YDS
Iowa State	Receiving	Xavier Hutchinson	10 REC, 123 YDS, 1 TD

=== At Oklahoma State ===
Iowa State Cyclones (4-5) vs. Oklahoma State Cowboys (6-3)

Quarter	1	2	3	4	Total
Iowa State	0	7	7	0	14
Oklahoma State	0	10	0	10	20

at Boone Pickens Stadium • Stillwater, OK

- Date: Saturday, November 12, 2022
- Game time: 2:30 p.m. CDT
- Game weather: Sunny • Temperature: 45
- Game attendance: 55,509
- Referee: Derek Anderson
- TV announcers (ESPNU): Beth Mowins (play-by-play), Kirk Morrison (analyst), and Stormy Buonantony (sideline)

Game information

Second Quarter

- (12:10) OSU - Tanner Brown 37 Yd Field Goal (Drive: 4 plays, 8 yards, 1:57 OSU 3-0)
- (7:20) ISU - Sean Shaw 4 Yd pass from Hunter Dekkers (Jace Gilbert Kick) (Drive: 3 plays, 9 yards, 1:03; ISU 7-3)
- (6:31) OSU - John Paul Richardson 83 Yd pass from Gunnar Gundy (Tanner Brown Kick) (Drive: 2 plays, 81 yards, 0:44; OSU 10-7)

Third Quarter

- (3:52) ISU - Jirehl Brock 1 Yd Run (Drake Nettles Kick) (Drive: 6 plays, 75 yards, 2:21; ISU 14-10)

Fourth Quarter

- (9:18) OSU - Jaden Nixon 14 Yd pass from Spencer Sanders (Tanner Brown Kick) (Drive: 8 plays, 63 yards, 2:24; OSU 17-14)
- (4:19) OSU - Tanner Brown 40 Yd Field Goal (Drive: 4 plays, 1 yard, 0:47 OSU 20-14)

Statistics	ISU	OSU
First downs	19	11
Total yards	333	244
Rushes/yards	36-59	35-57
Passing yards	274	187
Passing: Comp-Att-Int	28-43-3	14-25-2
Turnovers	5	2
Time of possession	33:39	26:21

Team	Category	Player	Statistics
Iowa State	Passing	Hunter Dekkers	28-42, 274 YDS, TD, 3 INT
Iowa State	Rushing	Cartevious Norton	17 CAR, 49 YDS
Iowa State	Receiving	Xavier Hutchinson	10 REC, 106 YDS
Oklahoma State	Passing	Gunnar Gundy	5-12, 103 YDS, TD, 2 INT
Oklahoma State	Rushing	Dominic Richardson	14 CAR, 41 YDS
Oklahoma State	Receiving	John Paul Richardson	3 REC, 90 YDS, TD

=== Vs. Texas Tech ===
Texas Tech Red Raiders (5-5) vs. Iowa State Cyclones (4-6)

Quarter	1	2	3	4	Total
Texas Tech	0	7	0	7	14
Iowa State	0	3	0	7	10

at Jack Trice Stadium • Ames, IA

- Date: Saturday, November 19, 2022
- Game time: 6:00 p.m. CDT
- Game weather: Clear, Cold • Temperature: 22
- Game attendance: 52,676
- Referee: Steve Baron
- TV announcers (FS1): Eric Collins (play-by-play) and Devin Gardner (analyst)

Game information

Second Quarter

- (12:23) TTU - Donovan Smith 1 Yd Run (Trey Wolff Kick) (Drive: 14 plays, 96 yards, 5:04; TTU 7-0)
- (6:38) ISU - Drake Nettles 36 yd Field Goal (Drive: 13 plays, 63 yards, 5:40; TTU 7-3)

Fourth Quarter

- (11:18) ISU - Easton Dean 24 Yd pass from Hunter Dekkers (Jace Gilbert Kick) (Drive: 7 plays, 53 yards, 2:59; ISU 10-7)
- (6:10) TTU - Baylor Cupp 4 Yd pass from Tyler Shough (Trey Wolff Kick) (Drive: 13 plays, 77 yards, 5:02; TTU 14-10)

Statistics	TTU	ISU
First downs	14	22
Total yards	246	422
Rushes/yards	38-105	43-128
Passing yards	141	294
Passing: Comp-Att-Int	15-21-0	23-36-0
Turnovers	1	0
Time of possession	23:55	36:05

Team	Category	Player	Statistics
Texas Tech	Passing	Tyler Shough	15-21, 141 YDS, 1 TD
Texas Tech	Rushing	Tahj Brooks	9 CAR, 45 YDS
Texas Tech	Receiving	Myles Price	3 REC, 42 YDS
Iowa State	Passing	Hunter Dekkers	23-35, 294 YDS, TD
Iowa State	Rushing	Cartevious Norton	19 CAR, 59 YDS
Iowa State	Receiving	Xavier Hutchinson	8 REC, 101 YDS

=== At TCU ===
Iowa State Cyclones (4–7) vs. TCU Horned Frogs (11–0)

Quarter	1	2	3	4	Total
Iowa State	0	7	0	7	14
TCU	24	10	21	7	62

at Amon G. Carter Stadium • Fort Worth, TX

- Date: Saturday, November 26, 2022
- Game time: 3:00 p.m. CST
- Game weather: Cloudy • Temperature: 49 °F (9 °C) • Wind: W at 14 miles per hour (23 km/h)
- Game attendance: 44,846
- Referee: Kevin Boitmann
- TV announcers (FOX): Jason Benetti (play-by-play), Brock Huard (analyst), and Allison Williams (sideline)

Game information

First Quarter

- (10:13) TCU – Geor'quarius Spivey 19 Yd pass from Max Duggan (Griffin Kell Kick) (Drive: 9 plays, 73 yards, 4:41; TCU 7–0)
- (04:54) TCU – Griffin Kell 36 Yd Field Goal (Drive: 10 plays, 53 yards, 3:22; TCU 10–0)
- (02:15) TCU – Kendre Miller 25 Yd Run (Griffin Kell Kick) (Drive: 3 plays, 45 yards, 1:16; TCU 17–0)
- (02:03) TCU – Millard Bradford 36 Yd Interception Return (Griffin Kell Kick) (TCU 24–0)

Second Quarter

- (13:16) ISU – DeShawn Hankika 15 Yd pass from Hunter Dekkers (Jace Gilbert Kick) (Drive: 10 plays, 75 yards, 3:47; TCU 24–7)
- (11:29) TCU – Griffin Kell 54 Yd Field Goal (Drive: 4 plays, 0 yards, 1:38; TCU 27–7)
- (00:14) TCU – Kendre Miller 1 Yd Run (Griffin Kell Kick) (Drive: 6 plays, 22 yards, 1:09; TCU 34–7)

Third Quarter

- (06:25) TCU – Savion Williams 2 Yd pass from Max Duggan (Griffin Kell Kick) (Drive: 9 plays, 80 yards, 4:15; TCU 41–0)
- (02:00) TCU – Jordan Hudson 13 Yd pass from Max Duggan (Griffin Kell Kick) (Drive: 6 plays, 38 yards, 3:30; TCU 48–0)
- (01:02) TCU – Josh Newton 36 Yd Interception Return (Griffin Kell Kick) (TCU 55–7)

Fourth Quarter

- (13:46) ISU – Deon Silas 19 Yd Run (Keegan Shackford Kick) (Drive: 5 plays, 75 yards, 2:16; TCU 55–14)
- (01:00) TCU – Jordan Hudson 2 Yd pass from Chandler Morris (Griffin Kell Kick) (Drive: 13 plays, 97 yards, 7:53; TCU 62–14)

Statistics	ISU	TCU
First downs	19	21
Total yards	330	377
Rushes/yards	31/159	38/131
Passing yards	171	246
Passing: Comp–Att–Int	19–38–2	22–30–0
Turnovers	3	0
Time of possession	26:08	33:52

Team	Category	Player	Statistics
Iowa State	Passing	Hunter Dekkers	12-24, 106 YDS, TD, INT
Iowa State	Rushing	Eli Sanders	7 CAR, 91 YDS
Iowa State	Receiving	DeShawn Hanika	3 REC, 49 YDS, TD
TCU	Passing	Max Duggan	17-24, 212 YDS, 3 TD
TCU	Rushing	Kendre Miller	15 CAR, 72 YDS, 2 TD
TCU	Receiving	Savion Williams	5 REC, 48 YDS, TD

== Personnel ==
=== Coaching staff ===
Name	Position	Year at Iowa State	Previous job
Matt Campbell	Head coach	7th	Toledo (HC)
Jon Heacock	Defensive coordinator	7th	Toledo (DC)
Tom Manning	Offensive coordinator	6th	Indianapolis Colts (TE)
Tyson Veidt	Assistant head coach/linebackers	7th	Toledo (LB)
Eli Rasheed	Defensive line	7th	Toledo (DL)
Joel Gordon	Passing game coordinator/QB	7th	Ferrum (OC)
Jeff Myers	Offensive line	7th	Toledo (graduate assistant)
Nathan Scheelhaase	Run game coordinator/running backs/wide receivers	5th	Illinois (offensive analyst)
Matt Caponi	Cornerbacks	4th	West Virginia (DB)
Taylor Mouser	Tight ends	7th	Toledo (GA)
Deon Broomfield	Safeties	2nd	Houston Texans (DA)
Jake Waters	Offensive quality control	3rd	UTEP (WR)

=== Roster ===
2022 Iowa State Cyclones Football Roster
Quarterback: 3 Rocco Becht – freshman (6'1, 199); 10 Blake Clark – (redshirt) senior (6'2, 201); 11 Nate Glantz – junior (6'2, 205); 12 Hunter Dekkers – (redshirt) sophomore (6'3, 206); 18 Ashton Cook – (redshirt) freshman (6'3, 215); Running back: 5 Cartevious Norton – freshman (5'11, 212); 6 Eli Sanders – (redshirt) freshman (6'0, 200); 21 Jirehl Brock – (redshirt) junior (6'0, 220); 22 Deon Silas – sophomore (5'8, 180); 34 Blaze Doxzon – (redshirt) sophomore (5'9, 207); 35 Caden Kock – freshman (6'0, 211); 38 Levi Hummel – (redshirt) junior (5'11, 215); 42 Trey Mathis – (redshirt) freshman (6'0, 211); Wide receiver: 0 Greg Gaines III – freshman (6'2, 197); 2 Sean Shaw Jr. – (redshirt) senior (6'6, 212); 7 Darren Wilson Jr. – (redshirt) senior (6'3, 202); 8 Xavier Hutchinson (C) – (redshirt) senior (6'3, 205); 11 Jason Essex – freshman (6'2, 224); 13 Jaylin Noel – sophomore (5'10, 190); 14 Dimitri Stanley – (redshirt) senior (6'0, 196); 16 Daniel Jackson – (redshirt) sophomore (6'2, 212); 19 Beau Coberley – (redshirt) senior (5'11, 176); 23 Quaron Adams – freshman (5'7, 165); 32 Carson Brown – freshman (6'1, 179); 80 Tristan Michaud – (redshirt) freshman (6'6, 208); 85 Aidan Bitter – (redshirt) sophomore (6'2, 204); 89 Tyler Claiborne – freshman (6'2, 195); Tight end: 43 Jared Rus – (redshirt) senior (6'2, 242); 45 Kevin Sawitzke – (redshirt) freshman (6'5, 253); 48 Jack Bjorn – freshman (6'7, 262); 49 Stevo Klotz – (redshirt) sophomore (6'4, 248); 82 Tyler Moore – (redshirt) freshman (6'5, 249); 83 DeShawn Hanika – (redshirt) junior (6'6, 238); 84 Gabe Burkle – freshman (6'5, 250); 86 Jacob Hillman – (redshirt) senior (6'2, 215); 86 Andrew Keller – freshman (6'6, 217); 87 Easton Dean – (redshirt) junior (6'6, 249); Punter: 80 Tyler Perkins – freshman (5'11, 195); 94 Cameron Shook – (redshirt) senior (6'3, 191); 96 Ben Garbarini – (redshirt) senior (6'0, 198); Kicker: 20 Jace Gilbert – freshman (5'10, 200); 39 Tyler Bittman – (redshirt) freshman (6'2, 220); 97 Drake Nettles – (redshirt) junior (5'11, 182); 98 Trent McCann – (redshirt) sophomore (6'1, 193); 99 Keegan Shackford – (redshirt) freshman (5'10, 194); Deep Snapper: 51 Drake Knobloch – freshman (6'2, 253); 59 Connor Guess – (redshirt) senior (5'11, 228)	Offensive line: 50 Tyler Maro – (redshirt) freshman (6'7, 286); 52 Trevor Downing (C) – (redshirt) senior (6'5, 304); 53 Evan Ladwig – (redshirt) freshman (6'4, 287); 54 Jarrod Hufford – (redshirt) junior (6'5, 314); 55 Darrell Simmons Jr. – (redshirt) junior (6'3, 307); 56 Anthony Smith – (redshirt) sophomore (6'3, 297); 59 Jack Hester – (redshirt) sophomore (6'4, 267); 62 Dodge Sauser – (redshirt) freshman (6'5, 292); 63 Jim Bonifas – (redshirt) freshman (6'5, 298); 65 Sam Rengert – (redshirt) sophomore (6'7, 308); 66 Tyler Miller – (redshirt) sophomore (6'9, 316); 67 Grant Treiber – (redshirt) junior (6'6, 315); 68 Zach Ross – (redshirt) senior (6'3, 295); 69 Hunter Deyo – freshman (6'2, 280); 72 Jake Remsburg – (redshirt) junior (6'6, 317); 73 Brady Petersen – (redshirt) sophomore (6'5, 292); 74 Hayden Pauls – (redshirt) sophomore (6'5, 303); 75 James Neal – sophomore (6'6, 325); 76 Oluwafunto Akinshilo – sophomore (6'6, 350); 77 Easton Eledge – freshman (6'3, 300); 78 Nick Lawler – (redshirt) sophomore (6'3, 336); 79 Deylin Hasert – freshman (6'4, 309); Defensive line: 3 MJ Anderson – (redshirt) junior (6'3, 275); 9 Will McDonald IV – (redshirt) senior (6'3, 236); 11 Tyler Onyedim – (redshirt) freshman (6'4, 292); 40 Hunter Zenzen – (redshirt) sophomore (6'2, 245); 44 Johnny Wilson – (redshirt) sophomore (6'4, 247); 48 Tommy Hamann – freshman (6'4, 245); 52 Joey Petersen – sophomore (6'4, 238); 56 J. R. Singleton – (redshirt) sophomore (6'2, 300); 58 Isaiah Lee – (redshirt) senior (6'0, 292); 71 Gabe Greenlee – freshman (6'7, 273); 88 Ikenna Ezeogu – freshman (6'5, 235); 89 Trent Jones II – (redshirt) freshman (6'3, 280); 90 Braden Simonsen – freshman (6'3, 226); 91 Blake Peterson – (redshirt) junior (6'4, 260); 94 Kyle Krezek – (redshirt) junior (6'3, 262); 95 Domonique Orange – freshman (6'4, 350); 96 Chet Andrews – freshman (6'3, 236); 97 Jayden Gray – (redshirt) freshman (6'3, 254); 97 Kaden Sutton – (redshirt) sophomore (6'0, 300); 98 Seth Greiner – (redshirt) sophomore (6'3, 272); 99 Howard Brown – (redshirt) freshman (6'2, 312)	Linebacker: 4 Colby Reeder – (redshirt) senior (6'4, 242); 6 Myle Mendeszoon – (redshirt) freshman (6'4, 220); 12 Jacob Imming – freshman (6'2, 222); 14 Carson Willich – freshman (6'1, 214); 21 Cole Pedersen – (redshirt) sophomore (6'3, 240); 23 Will McLaughlin – freshman (6'4, 225); 32 Gerry Vaughn – (redshirt) senior (5'11, 231); 34 O'Rien Vance (C) – (redshirt) senior (6'2, 260); 35 Jacob Ellis – sophomore (6'1, 218); 42 John Klosterman – freshman (5'11, 215); 45 Alec Cook – freshman (6'5, 305); 46 Carston Marshall – (redshirt) freshman (6'2, 215); 47 Kendall Jackson – (redshirt) senior (5'11, 230); 50 Caleb Bacon – (redshirt) freshman (6'3, 229); 54 Aidan Ralph – (redshirt) freshman (6'2, 220); Defensive back: 0 Mason Chambers – junior (5'10, 200); 1 Anthony Johnson Jr. (C) – (redshirt) senior (6'0, 207); 2 T. J. Tampa – junior (6'2, 185); 5 Myles Purchase – sophomore (5'11, 1892); 7 Malik Verdon – (redshirt) freshman (6'4, 214); 10 Darien Porter – (redshirt) junior (6'4, 185); 13 Tayvonn Kyle – (redshirt) senior (5'11, 189); 17 Beau Freyler – sophomore (6'2, 212); 18 Ben Nikkel – (redshirt) junior (6'1, 195); 19 Jeremiah Cooper – freshman (6'0, 178); 20 Terrell Crosby Jr. – freshman (5'11, 174); 22 Blake Thompson – sophomore (6'1, 194); 24 Treyveon McGee – sophomore (6'2, 198); 25 Trevon Howard – freshman (6'1, 200); 26 Myles Norwood – freshman (6'2, 170); 29 Quincy Wiseman – (redshirt) freshman (6'2, 177); 31 Jontez Williams – freshman (5'11, 195); 36 Zack Anderson – freshman (6'0, 170); 38 Eddie Lemos – freshman (5'10, 184); 39 Asle Thorson – (redshirt) sophomore (6'1, 202); 41 Tyee Leske – (redshirt) freshman (6'2, 197); 43 Caden Matson – freshman (6'0, 190); 44 Mason DouBrava – (redshirt) freshman (5'10, 168); Legend: (C) Team captain; (S) Suspended; (I) Ineligible; Injured; Redshirt

== Awards and honors ==
All-American Honors
Player	Selection
Offense
Defense

All-Big 12
Player	Selection
Offense
Xavier Hutchinson	Coaches-1;
Jared Rus	Coaches-2;
Trevor Downing	Coaches-2
Hunter Dekkers	Coaches-HM
Defense
Will McDonald IV	Coaches-1
Anthony Johnson Jr.	Coaches-2;
T. J. Tampa	Coaches-2;
M.J. Anderson	Coaches-HM
Beau Freyler	Coaches-HM
Myles Purchase	Coaches-HM
Colby Reeder	Coaches-HM
O'Rien Vance	Coaches-HM
Special Teams

Individual Awards
Player	Award
Jeremiah Cooper	Big 12 Defensive Freshman of the Year-Honorable Mention
Trevor Downing	Big 12 Offensive Lineman of the Year-Honorable Mention
Will McDonald IV	Big 12 Defensive Lineman of the Year-Honorable Mention Big 12 Defensive Player of the Year-Honorable Mention
Colby Reeder	Big 12 Defensive Newcomer of the Year-Honorable Mention

Weekly Awards
Player	Award	Date Awarded
Colby Reeder	Big 12 Co-Newcomer of the Week	Week 2, 2022
Cartevious Norton	Big 12 Co-Newcomer of the Week	Week 10, 2022

== TV ratings ==
Opponent	Outlet	Viewers	Rating
SE Missouri	ESPN+	†	†
@ Iowa	BTN	1.47M	N/A
Ohio	ESPN+	†	†
Baylor	ESPN2	762K	.43
@ Kansas	ESPN2	865K	.45
Kansas State	ESPNU	373K	†
@ Texas	ABC	2.35M	1.3
Oklahoma	FS1	711K	0.40
West Virginia	ESPN+	†	†
@Oklahoma State	ESPNU	272K	N/A
Texas Tech	FS1	545K	0.28
@ TCU	FOX	4.34M	2.1

All totals via Sports Media Watch. Streaming numbers not included. † - Data not available.
