= Gabe Burkle =

American football player

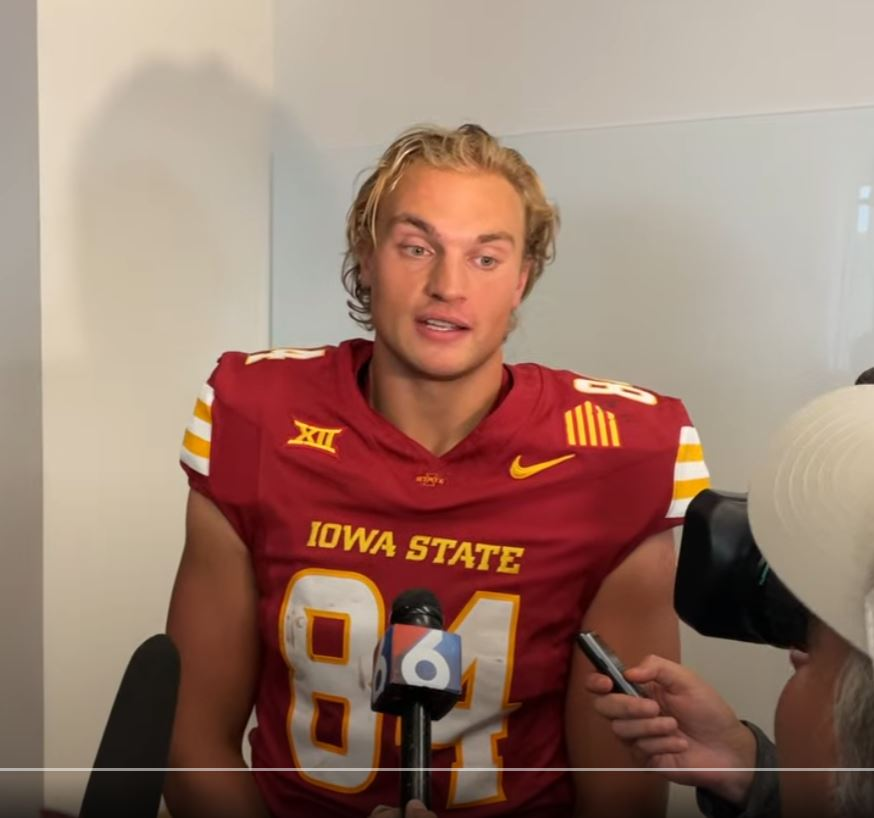
- Burkle at a press conference in 2025

No. 84 – Penn State Nittany Lions
- Position: Tight end
- Class: Redshirt Senior

Personal information
- Listed height: 6 ft 6 in (1.98 m)
- Listed weight: 247 lb (112 kg)

Career information
- High school: Prairie (Cedar Rapids, Iowa)
- College: Iowa State (2022–2025); Penn State (2026–present)
- Stats at ESPN

Gabe Burkle is an American college football tight end for the Penn State Nittany Lions. He previously played for the Iowa State Cyclones.

== Early life ==
Burkle attended Prairie High School in Cedar Rapids, Iowa. As a sophomore, he notched six receptions for 126 yards. As a junior, Burkle recorded 10 catches for 155 yards and a touchdown in four games before suffering a season-ending knee injury. Coming out of high school, he was rated as a three-star recruit and committed to play college football for the Iowa State Cyclones.

== College career ==
=== Iowa State ===
In his first two seasons in 2022 and 2023, Burkle appeared in 15 games, where he hauled in two passes for nine yards, while also utilizing a redshirt season in 2022. In week 10 of the 2024 season, he brought in four receptions for 45 yards in the Cyclones first loss of the season to Texas Tech. In week 12, Burkle notched six receptions for 73 yards in a win over Cincinnati. In the 2024 Pop-Tarts Bowl, he hauled in his first career touchdown in a 42-41 win victory over Miami. Burkle played in all 14 games in the 2024 season and recorded 26 receptions for 296 yards and a touchdown.

On December 24, 2025, Burkle announced that he would enter the transfer portal.

=== Penn State ===
On January 4, 2026, Burkle announced that he would transfer to Penn State.

=== Statistics ===
Year	Team	Games		Receiving			
Year	Team	GP	GS	Rec	Yds	Avg	TD
2022	Iowa State	2	0	0	0	0.0	0
2023	Iowa State	13	1	2	9	4.5	0
2024	Iowa State	14	8	26	296	11.4	1
2025	Iowa State	9	7	26	302	11.6	1
Career		38	16	54	607	11.2	2
