= 2024 NCAA Division I FBS football rankings =

- Season: 2024
- Bowl season: 2024–25 bowl games
- Preseason No. 1: Georgia
- End of season champions: Ohio State
- Conference with most teams in final AP poll: SEC (7)

Human polls and a committee's selections comprise the 2024 National Collegiate Athletic Association (NCAA) Division I Football Bowl Subdivision (FBS) football rankings, in addition to various publications' preseason polls. Unlike most sports, college football's governing body, the NCAA, does not bestow a national championship at the FBS level. Instead, that title is bestowed by one or more different polling agencies. There are two main weekly polls that begin in the preseason—the AP Poll and the Coaches Poll. One additional poll, the College Football Playoff (CFP) ranking, is usually released starting midway through the season. The CFP rankings determine who makes the new twelve-team playoff that determines the College Football Playoff National Champion.

== Legend ==
	Increase in ranking
	Decrease in ranking
	Not ranked previous week
	Selected for College Football Playoff
(#–#)	Win–loss record
(Italics)	Number of first place votes

== AP Poll ==
	Preseason Aug 12	Week 1 Sep 3	Week 2 Sep 8	Week 3 Sep 15	Week 4 Sep 22	Week 5 Sep 29	Week 6 Oct 6	Week 7 Oct 13	Week 8 Oct 20	Week 9 Oct 27	Week 10 Nov 3	Week 11 Nov 10	Week 12 Nov 17	Week 13 Nov 24	Week 14 Dec 1	Week 15 Dec 8	Week 16 (Final) Jan 20	
1.	Georgia (46)	Georgia (1–0) (57)	Georgia (2–0) (54)	Texas (3–0) (35)	Texas (4–0) (44)	Alabama (4–0) (40)	Texas (5–0) (52)	Texas (6–0) (56)	Oregon (7–0) (59)	Oregon (8–0) (61)	Oregon (9–0) (62)	Oregon (10–0) (62)	Oregon (11–0) (62)	Oregon (11–0) (61)	Oregon (12–0) (62)	Oregon (13–0) (62)	Ohio State (14–2) (56)	1.
2.	Ohio State (15)	Ohio State (1–0) (5)	Texas (2–0) (4)	Georgia (3–0) (23)	Georgia (3–0) (13)	Texas (5–0) (19)	Ohio State (5–0) (9)	Oregon (6–0) (6)	Georgia (6–1) (2)	Georgia (6–1)	Georgia (7–1)	Ohio State (8–1)	Ohio State (9–1)	Ohio State (10–1)	Texas (11–1)	Georgia (11–2)	Notre Dame (14–2)	2.
3.	Oregon (1)	Texas (1–0)	Ohio State (2–0) (5)	Ohio State (2–0) (5)	Ohio State (3–0) (5)	Ohio State (4–0) (4)	Oregon (5–0)	Penn State (6–0)	Penn State (6–0)	Penn State (7–0)	Ohio State (7–1)	Texas (8–1)	Texas (9–1)	Texas (10–1)	Penn State (11–1)	Notre Dame (11–1)	Oregon (13–1)	3.
4.	Texas	Alabama (1–0)	Alabama (2–0)	Alabama (3–0)	Alabama (3–0)	Tennessee (4–0)	Penn State (5–0)	Ohio State (5–1)	Ohio State (5–1)	Ohio State (6–1)	Miami (FL) (9–0)	Penn State (8–1)	Penn State (9–1)	Penn State (10–1)	Notre Dame (11–1)	Texas (11–2)	Texas (13–3)	4.
5.	Alabama	Notre Dame (1–0)	Ole Miss (2–0)	Ole Miss (3–0)	Tennessee (4–0)	Georgia (3–1)	Georgia (4–1)	Georgia (5–1)	Texas (6–1)	Miami (FL) (8–0)	Texas (7–1)	Indiana (10–0)	Indiana (10–0)	Notre Dame (10–1)	Georgia (10–2)	Penn State (11–2)	Penn State (13–3)	5.
6.	Ole Miss	Ole Miss (1–0)	Missouri (2–0)	Tennessee (3–0)	Ole Miss (4–0)	Oregon (4–0)	Miami (FL) (6–0)	Miami (FL) (6–0)	Miami (FL) (7–0)	Texas (7–1)	Penn State (7–1)	Tennessee (8–1)	Notre Dame (9–1)	Georgia (9–2)	Tennessee (10–2)	Ohio State (10–2)	Georgia (11–3)	6.
7.	Notre Dame	Oregon (1–0)	Tennessee (2–0)	Missouri (3–0)	Miami (FL) (4–0)	Penn State (4–0)	Alabama (4–1)	Alabama (5–1)	Tennessee (6–1)	Tennessee (6–1)	Tennessee (7–1)	BYU (9–0)	Alabama (8–2)	Tennessee (9–2)	Ohio State (10–2)	Tennessee (10–2)	Arizona State (11–3)	7.
8.	Penn State	Penn State (1–0)	Penn State (2–0)	Miami (FL) (3–0)	Oregon (3–0)	Miami (FL) (5–0)	Tennessee (4–1)	LSU (5–1)	LSU (6–1)	Notre Dame (7–1)	Indiana (9–0)	Notre Dame (8–1)	Georgia (8–2)	Miami (FL) (10–1)	SMU (11–1)	Boise State (12–1)	Boise State (12–2)	8.
9.	Michigan	Missouri (1–0)	Oregon (2–0)	Oregon (3–0)	Penn State (3–0)	Missouri (4–0)	Ole Miss (5–1)	Iowa State (6–0)	Clemson (6–1)	BYU (8–0)	BYU (8–0)	Alabama (7–2)	Ole Miss (8–2)	SMU (10–1)	Indiana (11–1)	Indiana (11–1)	Tennessee (10–3)	9.
10.	Florida State	Michigan (1–0)	Miami (FL) (2–0)	Penn State (2–0)	Utah (4–0)	Michigan (4–1)	Clemson (4–1)	Clemson (5–1)	Iowa State (7–0)	Texas A&M (7–1)	Notre Dame (7–1)	Ole Miss (8–2)	Tennessee (8–2)	Indiana (10–1)	Boise State (11–1)	Arizona State (11–2)	Indiana (11–2)	10.
11.	Missouri	Utah (1–0)	USC (2–0)	USC (2–0)	Missouri (4–0)	USC (3–1)	Iowa State (5–0) т	Tennessee (5–1)	BYU (7–0)	Clemson (6–1) т	Alabama (6–2)	Georgia (7–2)	Miami (FL) (9–1)	Boise State (10–1)	Alabama (9–3)	Alabama (9–3)	Ole Miss (10–3)	11.
12.	Utah	Miami (FL) (1–0)	Utah (2–0)	Utah (3–0)	Michigan (3–1)	Ole Miss (4–1)	Notre Dame (4–1) т	Notre Dame (5–1)	Notre Dame (6–1)	Iowa State (7–0) т	Boise State (7–1)	Miami (FL) (9–1)	Boise State (9–1)	Clemson (9–2)	Arizona State (10–2)	SMU (11–2)	SMU (11–3)	12.
13.	LSU	USC (1–0)	Oklahoma State (2–0)	Kansas State (3–0)	USC (2–1)	LSU (4–1)	LSU (4–1)	BYU (6–0)	Indiana (7–0)	Indiana (8–0)	SMU (8–1)	Boise State (8–1)	SMU (9–1)	Alabama (8–3)	South Carolina (9–3)	Clemson (10–3)	BYU (11–2)	13.
14.	Clemson	Tennessee (1–0)	Kansas State (2–0)	Oklahoma State (3–0)	LSU (3–1)	Notre Dame (4–1)	BYU (5–0)	Texas A&M (5–1)	Texas A&M (6–1)	Alabama (6–2)	LSU (6–2)	SMU (8–1)	BYU (9–1)	Arizona State (9–2)	Miami (FL) (10–2)	South Carolina (9–3)	Clemson (10–4)	14.
15.	Tennessee	Oklahoma (1–0)	Oklahoma (2–0)	Oklahoma (3–0)	Louisville (3–0)	Clemson (3–1)	Texas A&M (5–1)	Boise State (5–1)	Alabama (5–2)	Boise State (6–1)	Texas A&M (7–2)	Texas A&M (7–2)	Texas A&M (8–2)	Ole Miss (8–3)	Ole Miss (9–3)	Miami (FL) (10–2)	Iowa State (11–3)	15.
16.	Oklahoma	Oklahoma State (1–0)	LSU (1–1)	LSU (2–1)	Notre Dame (3–1)	Iowa State (4–0)	Utah (4–1)	Indiana (6–0)	Kansas State (6–1)	LSU (6–2)	Ole Miss (7–2)	Army (9–0)	Colorado (8–2)	South Carolina (8–3)	Iowa State (10–2)	Ole Miss (9–3)	Illinois (10–3)	16.
17.	Oklahoma State	Kansas State (1–0)	Michigan (1–1)	Notre Dame (2–1)	Clemson (2–1)	BYU (5–0)	Boise State (4–1)	Kansas State (5–1)	Boise State (5–1)	Kansas State (7–1)	Iowa State (7–1)	Clemson (7–2)	Clemson (8–2)	Iowa State (9–2)	BYU (10–2)	BYU (10–2)	Alabama (9–4)	17.
18.	Kansas State	LSU (0–1)	Notre Dame (1–1)	Michigan (2–1)	Iowa State (3–0)	Utah (4–1)	Kansas State (4–1) т	Ole Miss (5–2)	Ole Miss (5–2)	Pittsburgh (7–0)	Army (8–0)	Colorado (7–2)	Army (9–0)	Tulane (9–2)	Clemson (9–3)	Iowa State (10–3)	Miami (FL) (10–3)	18.
19.	Miami (FL)	Kansas (1–0)	Louisville (2–0)	Louisville (2–0)	Illinois (4–0)	Oklahoma (4–1)	Indiana (6–0) т	Missouri (5–1)	Pittsburgh (6–0)	Ole Miss (6–2)	Clemson (6–2)	Washington State (8–1)	South Carolina (7–3)	BYU (9–2)	UNLV (10–2)	Army (11–1)	South Carolina (9–4)	19.
20.	Texas A&M	Arizona (1–0)	Arizona (2–0)	Iowa State (2–0)	Oklahoma State (3–1)	Kansas State (4–1)	Oklahoma (4–1) т	Pittsburgh (6–0)	Illinois (6–1)	SMU (7–1)	Washington State (7–1)	Kansas State (7–2)	Tulane (9–2)	Texas A&M (8–3)	Colorado (9–3)	Colorado (9–3)	Syracuse (10–3)	20.
21.	Arizona	Iowa (1–0)	Iowa State (2–0)	Clemson (1–1)	Oklahoma (3–1)	Boise State (3–1)	Missouri (4–1)	SMU (5–1)	Missouri (6–1)	Army (7–0)	Colorado (6–2)	LSU (6–3)	Arizona State (8–2)	UNLV (9–2)	Illinois (9–3)	Illinois (9–3)	Army (12–2)	21.
22.	Kansas	Louisville (1–0)	Clemson (1–1)	Nebraska (3–0)	BYU (4–0)	Louisville (3–1)	Pittsburgh (5–0)	Illinois (5–1)	SMU (6–1)	Washington State (7–1)	Kansas State (7–2)	Louisville (6–3)	Iowa State (8–2)	Illinois (8–3)	Missouri (9–3)	Syracuse (9–3)	Missouri (10–3)	22.
23.	USC	Georgia Tech (2–0)	Nebraska (2–0)	Northern Illinois (2–0)	Kansas State (3–1)	Indiana (5–0)	Illinois (4–1)	Army (6–0)	Army (7–0)	Colorado (6–2)	Pittsburgh (7–1)	South Carolina (6–3)	UNLV (8–2)	Colorado (8–3)	Syracuse (9–3)	Missouri (9–3)	UNLV (11–3)	23.
24.	NC State	NC State (1–0)	Boston College (2–0)	Illinois (3–0)	Texas A&M (3–1)	Illinois (4–1)	Michigan (4–2)	Michigan (4–2)	Navy (6–0)	Illinois (6–2)	Vanderbilt (6–3)	Missouri (7–2)	Illinois (7–3)	Missouri (8–3)	Army (10–1)	UNLV (10–3)	Memphis (11–2)	24.
25.	Iowa	Clemson (0–1)	Northern Illinois (2–0)	Texas A&M (2–1)	Boise State (2–1)	UNLV (4–0) т; Texas A&M (4–1) т	SMU (5–1)	Navy (5–0)	Vanderbilt (5–2)	Missouri (6–2)	Louisville (6–3)	Tulane (8–2)	Washington State (8–2)	Army (9–1)	Memphis (10–2)	Memphis (10–2)	Colorado (9–4)	25.
	Preseason Aug 12	Week 1 Sep 3	Week 2 Sep 8	Week 3 Sep 15	Week 4 Sep 22	Week 5 Sep 29	Week 6 Oct 6	Week 7 Oct 13	Week 8 Oct 20	Week 9 Oct 27	Week 10 Nov 3	Week 11 Nov 10	Week 12 Nov 17	Week 13 Nov 24	Week 14 Dec 1	Week 15 Dec 8	Week 16 (Final) Jan 20	
		Dropped: Florida State (0–2); Texas A&M (0–1)	Dropped: Kansas (1–1); Iowa (1–1); Georgia Tech (2–1); NC State (1–1)	Dropped: Arizona (2–1); Boston College (2–1)	Dropped: Nebraska (3–1); Northern Illinois (2–1)	Dropped: Oklahoma State (3–2)	Dropped: USC (3–2); Louisville (3–2); UNLV (4–1)	Dropped: Utah (4–2); Oklahoma (4–2)	Dropped: Michigan (4–3)	Dropped: Navy (6–1); Vanderbilt (5–3)	Dropped: Illinois (6–3); Missouri (6–2)	Dropped: Iowa State (7–2); Pittsburgh (7–2); Vanderbilt (6–4)	Dropped: Kansas State (7–3); LSU (6–4); Louisville (6–4); Missouri (7–3)	Dropped: Washington State (8–3)	Dropped: Tulane (9–3); Texas A&M (8–4)	None	None	

== Coaches Poll ==
	Preseason Aug 5	Week 1 Sep 3	Week 2 Sep 8	Week 3 Sep 15	Week 4 Sep 22	Week 5 Sep 29	Week 6 Oct 6	Week 7 Oct 13	Week 8 Oct 20	Week 9 Oct 27	Week 10 Nov 3	Week 11 Nov 10	Week 12 Nov 17	Week 13 Nov 24	Week 14 Dec 1	Week 15 Dec 8	Week 16 (Final) Jan 21	
1.	Georgia (46)	Georgia (1–0) (51)	Georgia (2–0) (50)	Georgia (3–0) (42)	Georgia (3–0) (35)	Texas (5–0) (29)	Texas (5–0) (44)	Texas (6–0) (53)	Oregon (7–0) (51)	Oregon (8–0) (53)	Oregon (9–0) (53)	Oregon (10–0) (55)	Oregon (11–0) (55)	Oregon (11–0) (55)	Oregon (12–0) (53)	Oregon (13–0) (54)	Ohio State (14–2) (53)	1.
2.	Ohio State (7)	Ohio State (1–0) (3)	Ohio State (2–0) (3)	Texas (3–0) (10)	Texas (4–0) (18)	Alabama (4–0) (19)	Ohio State (5–0) (11)	Oregon (6–0) (2)	Georgia (6–1) (2)	Georgia (6–1) (1)	Georgia (7–1) (1)	Ohio State (8–1)	Ohio State (9–1)	Ohio State (10–1)	Texas (11–1)	Georgia (11–2)	Notre Dame (14–2)	2.
3.	Oregon	Texas (1–0) (1)	Texas (2–0) (1)	Ohio State (2–0) (3)	Ohio State (3–0) (2)	Ohio State (4–0) (7)	Oregon (5–0)	Penn State (6–0)	Penn State (6–0)	Penn State (7–0)	Ohio State (7–1)	Texas (8–1)	Texas (9–1)	Texas (10–1)	Penn State (11–1)	Notre Dame (11–1)	Texas (13–3)	3.
4.	Texas (1)	Alabama (1–0)	Alabama (2–0)	Alabama (3–0)	Alabama (3–0)	Tennessee (4–0)	Georgia (4–1)	Georgia (5–1)	Ohio State (5–1)	Ohio State (6–1)	Miami (FL) (9–0)	Tennessee (8–1)	Penn State (9–1)	Penn State (10–1)	Notre Dame (11–1)	Texas (11–2)	Oregon (13–1)	4.
5.	Alabama	Ole Miss (1–0)	Ole Miss (2–0)	Ole Miss (3–0)	Ole Miss (4–0)	Georgia (3–1)	Penn State (5–0)	Ohio State (5–1)	Miami (FL) (7–0)	Miami (FL) (8–0)	Texas (7–1)	Penn State (8–1)	Indiana (10–0)	Notre Dame (10–1)	Georgia (10–2)	Penn State (11–2)	Penn State (13–3)	5.
6.	Ole Miss	Oregon (1–0)	Oregon (2–0)	Oregon (3–0)	Tennessee (4–0)	Oregon (4–0)	Miami (FL) (6–0)	Miami (FL) (6–0)	Texas (6–1)	Texas (7–1)	Tennessee (7–1)	Indiana (10–0)	Notre Dame (9–1)	Georgia (9–2)	Tennessee (10–2)	Tennessee (10–2)	Georgia (11–3)	6.
7.	Notre Dame	Notre Dame (1–0)	Penn State (2–0)	Tennessee (3–0)	Oregon (3–0)	Penn State (4–0)	Alabama (4–1)	Alabama (5–1)	LSU (6–1)	Tennessee (6–1)	Penn State (7–1)	Notre Dame (8–1)	Alabama (8–2)	Miami (FL) (10–1)	SMU (11–1)	Ohio State (10–2)	Arizona State (11–3)	7.
8.	Michigan (1)	Penn State (1–0)	Missouri (2–0)	Penn State (2–0)	Penn State (3–0)	Miami (FL) (5–0)	Ole Miss (5–1)	LSU (5–1)	Tennessee (6–1)	Clemson (6–1)	Notre Dame (7–1)	BYU (9–0)	Georgia (8–2)	Tennessee (9–2)	Ohio State (10–2)	Boise State (12–1)	Tennessee (10–3)	8.
9.	Penn State	Michigan (1–0)	Tennessee (2–0)	Missouri (3–0)	Miami (FL) (4–0)	Missouri (4–0)	Tennessee (4–1)	Clemson (5–1)	Clemson (6–1)	Notre Dame (7–1)	BYU (8–0)	Alabama (7–2)	Ole Miss (8–2)	SMU (10–1)	Indiana (11–1)	Indiana (11–1)	Boise State (12–2)	9.
10.	Florida State	Missouri (1–0)	Utah (2–0)	Utah (3–0)	Utah (4–0)	Michigan (4–1)	LSU (4–1)	Tennessee (5–1)	Iowa State (7–0)	Iowa State (7–0)	Indiana (9–0)	Georgia (7–2)	Miami (FL) (9–1)	Indiana (10–1)	Boise State (11–1)	Arizona State (11–2)	Indiana (11–2)	10.
11.	Missouri	Utah (1–0)	USC (2–0)	Miami (FL) (3–0)	Missouri (4–0)	Ole Miss (4–1)	Clemson (4–1)	Notre Dame (5–1)	Notre Dame (6–1)	Texas A&M (7–1)	Alabama (6–2)	Ole Miss (8–2)	Tennessee (8–2)	Boise State (10–1)	Alabama (9–3)	Alabama (9–3)	SMU (11–3) т	11.
12.	LSU	Tennessee (1–0)	Miami (FL) (2–0)	USC (2–0)	Michigan (3–1)	LSU (4–1)	Notre Dame (4–1)	Iowa State (6–0)	BYU (7–0)	BYU (8–0)	Ole Miss (7–2)	Miami (FL) (9–1)	SMU (9–1)	Clemson (9–2)	South Carolina (9–3)	SMU (11–2)	Clemson (10–4) т	12.
13.	Utah	Oklahoma (1–0)	Oklahoma (2–0)	Oklahoma (3–0)	LSU (3–1)	Notre Dame (4–1)	Iowa State (5–0)	BYU (6–0)	Indiana (7–0)	Indiana (8–0)	LSU (6–2)	SMU (8–1)	Boise State (9–1)	Alabama (8–3)	Arizona State (10–2)	Clemson (10–3)	Ole Miss (10–3)	13.
14.	Clemson	USC (1–0)	Oklahoma State (2–0)	Kansas State (3–0)	Notre Dame (3–1)	Clemson (3–1)	Texas A&M (5–1)	Texas A&M (5–1)	Texas A&M (6–1)	Alabama (6–2)	Boise State (7–1)	Boise State (8–1)	Texas A&M (8–2)	South Carolina (8–3)	Miami (FL) (10–2)	South Carolina (9–3)	BYU (11–2)	14.
15.	Tennessee	Miami (FL) (1–0)	Kansas State (2–0)	Oklahoma State (3–0)	Clemson (2–1)	USC (3–1)	BYU (5–0)	Ole Miss (5–2)	Alabama (5–2)	Kansas State (7–1)	SMU (8–1)	Texas A&M (7–2)	BYU (9–1)	Arizona State (9–2)	Ole Miss (9–3)	Ole Miss (9–3)	Iowa State (11–3)	15.
16.	Oklahoma	Kansas State (1–0)	Michigan (1–1)	LSU (2–1)	USC (2–1)	Iowa State (4–0)	Oklahoma (4–1)	Missouri (5–1)	Kansas State (6–1)	LSU (6–2)	Texas A&M (7–2)	Clemson (7–2)	Clemson (8–2)	Ole Miss (8–3)	Iowa State (10–2)	Miami (FL) (10–2)	Illinois (10–3)	16.
17.	Kansas State	Oklahoma State (1–0)	LSU (1–1)	Michigan (2–1)	Louisville (3–0)	Oklahoma (4–1)	Utah (4–1)	Kansas State (5–1)	Missouri (6–1)	Pittsburgh (7–0)	Clemson (6–2)	Army (9–0)	Army (9–0)	Iowa State (9–2)	Clemson (9–3)	BYU (10–2)	Alabama (9–4)	17.
18.	Oklahoma State	Arizona (1–0)	Arizona (2–0)	Notre Dame (2–1)	Oklahoma (3–1)	Utah (4–1)	Missouri (4–1)	Indiana (6–0)	Ole Miss (5–2)	Ole Miss (6–2)	Iowa State (7–1)	Washington State (8–1)	Colorado (8–2)	Tulane (9–2)	BYU (10–2)	Army (11–1)	Miami (FL) (10–3)	18.
19.	Miami (FL)	LSU (0–1)	Notre Dame (1–1)	Clemson (1–1)	Iowa State (3–0)	BYU (5–0)	Kansas State (4–1)	Boise State (5–1)	Boise State (5–1)	Boise State (6–1)	Army (8–0)	Kansas State (7–2)	South Carolina (7–3)	Texas A&M (8–3)	UNLV (10–2)	Iowa State (10–3)	South Carolina (9–4)	19.
20.	Texas A&M	Kansas (1–0)	Clemson (1–1)	Louisville (2–0)	Oklahoma State (3–1)	Kansas State (4–1)	Indiana (6–0)	Pittsburgh (6–0)	Pittsburgh (6–0)	SMU (7–1)	Washington State (7–1)	Colorado (7–2)	Tulane (9–2)	BYU (9–2)	Missouri (9–3)	Missouri (9–3)	Missouri (10–3)	20.
21.	Arizona	Iowa (1–0)	Louisville (2–0)	Iowa State (2–0)	Illinois (4–0)	Texas A&M (4–1)	Michigan (4–2)	Illinois (5–1)	Illinois (6–1)	Army (7–0)	Kansas State (7–2)	Missouri (7–2)	Iowa State (8–2)	UNLV (9–2)	Illinois (9–3)	Illinois (9–3)	Army (12–2)	21.
22.	NC State	Clemson (0–1)	Washington (2–0)	Nebraska (3–0)	BYU (4–0)	Louisville (3–1)	Boise State (4–1)	Michigan (4–2)	SMU (6–1)	Washington State (7–1)	Missouri (6–2)	LSU (6–3)	Arizona State (8–2)	Army (9–1)	Colorado (9–3)	Colorado (9–3)	Syracuse (10–3)	22.
23.	USC	NC State (1–0)	Iowa State (2–0)	Memphis (3–0)	UNLV (3–0)	UNLV (4–0)	Illinois (4–1)	SMU (5–1)	Army (7–0)	Missouri (6–2)	Pittsburgh (7–1)	South Carolina (6–3)	UNLV (8–2)	Memphis (9–2)	Army (10–1)	Memphis (10–2)	Memphis (11–2)	23.
24.	Kansas	Louisville (1–0)	Nebraska (2–0)	Texas A&M (2–1)	Texas A&M (3–1)	Indiana (5–0)	Pittsburgh (5–0)	Army (6–0)	Navy (6–0)	Illinois (6–2)	Colorado (6–2)	Louisville (6–3)	Memphis (9–2)	Missouri (8–3)	Memphis (10–2)	UNLV (10–3)	UNLV (11–3)	24.
25.	Iowa	Washington (1–0)	Memphis (2–0)	UNLV (3–0)	Kansas State (3–1)	Illinois (4–1)	SMU (5–1)	Nebraska (5–1)	Vanderbilt (5–2)	Memphis (7–1)	Vanderbilt (6–3)	Iowa State (7–2)	Kansas State (7–3)	Illinois (8–3)	Syracuse (9–3)	Syracuse (9–3)	Colorado (9–4)	25.
	Preseason Aug 5	Week 1 Sep 3	Week 2 Sep 8	Week 3 Sep 15	Week 4 Sep 22	Week 5 Sep 29	Week 6 Oct 6	Week 7 Oct 13	Week 8 Oct 20	Week 9 Oct 27	Week 10 Nov 3	Week 11 Nov 10	Week 12 Nov 17	Week 13 Nov 24	Week 14 Dec 1	Week 15 Dec 8	Week 16 (Final) Jan 21	
		Dropped: Florida State (0–2); Texas A&M (0–1)	Dropped: Iowa (1–1); Kansas (1–1); NC State (1–1)	Dropped: Arizona (2–1); Washington (2–1)	Dropped: Nebraska (3–1); Memphis (3–1)	Dropped: Oklahoma State (3–2)	Dropped: USC (3–2); Louisville (3–2); UNLV (4–1)	Dropped: Oklahoma (4–2); Utah (4–2)	Dropped: Michigan (4–3); Nebraska (5–2)	Dropped: Navy (6–1); Vanderbilt (5–3)	Dropped: Illinois (6–3); Memphis (7–2)	Dropped: Pittsburgh (7–2); Vanderbilt (6–4)	Dropped: Washington State (8–2); Missouri (7–3); LSU (6–4); Louisville (6–4)	Dropped: Colorado (8–3); Kansas State (8–3)	Dropped: Tulane (9–3); Texas A&M (8–4)	None	None	

== CFP rankings ==
Bold indicates teams whose rankings result in a bid to the College Football Playoff; Italics indicate a team whose rankings result in a bye in the College Football Playoff, assuming they win their conference championship games.

	Week 10 Nov 5	Week 11 Nov 12	Week 12 Nov 19	Week 13 Nov 26	Week 14 Dec 3	Week 15 (Final) Dec 8	
1.	**Oregon** (9–0)	**Oregon** (10–0)	**Oregon** (11–0)	**Oregon** (11–0)	**Oregon** (12–0)	**Oregon** (13–0)	1.
2.	**Ohio State** (7–1)	**Ohio State** (8–1)	**Ohio State** (9–1)	**Ohio State** (10–1)	**Texas** (11–1)	**Georgia** (11–2)	2.
3.	**Georgia** (7–1)	**Texas** (8–1)	**Texas** (9–1)	**Texas** (10–1)	**Penn State** (11–1)	**Texas** (11–2)	3.
4.	**Miami (FL)** (9–0)	**Penn State** (8–1)	**Penn State** (9–1)	**Penn State** (10–1)	**Notre Dame** (11–1)	**Penn State** (11–2)	4.
5.	**Texas** (7–1)	**Indiana** (10–0)	**Indiana** (10–0)	**Notre Dame** (10–1)	**Georgia** (10–2)	**Notre Dame** (11–1)	5.
6.	**Penn State** (7–1)	**BYU** (9–0)	**Notre Dame** (9–1)	**Miami (FL)** (10–1)	**Ohio State** (10–2)	**Ohio State** (10–2)	6.
7.	**Tennessee** (7–1)	**Tennessee** (8–1)	**Alabama** (8–2)	**Georgia** (9–2)	**Tennessee** (10–2)	**Tennessee** (10–2)	7.
8.	**Indiana** (9–0)	**Notre Dame** (8–1)	**Miami (FL)** (9–1)	**Tennessee** (9–2)	**SMU** (11–1)	**Indiana** (11–1)	8.
9.	**BYU** (8–0)	**Miami (FL)** (9–1)	**Ole Miss** (8–2)	**SMU** (10–1)	**Indiana** (11–1)	**Boise State** (12–1)	9.
10.	**Notre Dame** (7–1)	**Alabama** (7–2)	**Georgia** (8–2)	**Indiana** (10–1)	**Boise State** (11–1)	**SMU** (11–2)	10.
11.	**Alabama** (6–2)	**Ole Miss** (8–2)	Tennessee (8–2)	**Boise State** (10–1)	**Alabama** (9–3)	Alabama (9–3)	11.
12.	**Boise State** (7–1)	Georgia (7–2)	**Boise State** (9–1)	Clemson (9–2)	Miami (FL) (10–2)	**Arizona State** (11–2)	12.
13.	SMU (8–1)	**Boise State** (8–1)	SMU (9–1)	Alabama (8–3)	Ole Miss (9–3)	Miami (FL) (10–2)	13.
14.	Texas A&M (7–2)	SMU (8–1)	**BYU** (9–1)	Ole Miss (8–3)	South Carolina (9–3)	Ole Miss (9–3)	14.
15.	LSU (6–2)	Texas A&M (7–2)	Texas A&M (8–2)	South Carolina (8–3)	**Arizona State** (10–2)	South Carolina (9–3)	15.
16.	Ole Miss (7–2)	Kansas State (7–2)	Colorado (8–2)	**Arizona State** (9–2)	Iowa State (10–2)	**Clemson** (10–3)	16.
17.	Iowa State (7–1)	Colorado (7–2)	Clemson (8–2)	Tulane (9–2)	Clemson (9–3)	BYU (10–2)	17.
18.	Pittsburgh (7–1)	Washington State (8–1)	South Carolina (7–3)	Iowa State (9–2)	BYU (10–2)	Iowa State (10–3)	18.
19.	Kansas State (7–2)	Louisville (6–3)	Army (9–0)	BYU (9–2)	Missouri (9–3)	Missouri (9–3)	19.
20.	Colorado (6–2)	Clemson (7–2)	Tulane (9–2)	Texas A&M (8–3)	UNLV (10–2)	Illinois (9–3)	20.
21.	Washington State (7–1)	South Carolina (6–3)	Arizona State (8–2)	Missouri (8–3)	Illinois (9–3)	Syracuse (9–3)	21.
22.	Louisville (6–3)	LSU (6–3)	Iowa State (8–2)	UNLV (9–2)	Syracuse (9–3)	Army (11–1)	22.
23.	Clemson (6–2)	Missouri (7–2)	Missouri (7–3)	Illinois (8–3)	Colorado (9–3)	Colorado (9–3)	23.
24.	Missouri (6–2)	Army (9–0)	UNLV (8–2)	Kansas State (8–3)	Army (10–1)	UNLV (10–3)	24.
25.	Army (8–0)	Tulane (8–2)	Illinois (7–3)	Colorado (8–3)	Memphis (10–2)	Memphis (10–2)	25.
	Week 10 Nov 5	Week 11 Nov 12	Week 12 Nov 19	Week 13 Nov 26	Week 14 Dec 3	Week 15 (Final) Dec 8	
		Dropped: Iowa State (7–2); Pittsburgh (7–2)	Dropped: Kansas State (7–3); Washington State (8–2); Louisville (6–4); LSU (6–4)	Dropped: Army (9–1)	Dropped: Tulane (9–3); Texas A&M (8–4); Kansas State (8–4)	None	

== FWAA-NFF Super 16 Poll ==
The joint poll of the Football Writers Association of America and National Football Foundation is a human poll which the NCAA Football Bowl Subdivision Records book designates as being one of the "major selectors" of national championships. The NFF automatically awards its MacArthur Bowl National Championship Trophy to the winner of the College Football Playoff National Championship.

	Preseason Aug 12	Week 1 Sep 3	Week 2 Sep 8	Week 3 Sep 15	Week 4 Sep 22	Week 5 Sep 29	Week 6 Oct 6	Week 7 Oct 13	Week 8 Oct 20	Week 9 Oct 27	Week 10 Nov 3	Week 11 Nov 10	Week 12 Nov 17	Week 13 Nov 24	Week 14 Dec 1	Week 15 (Final) Dec 8	
1.	Georgia (38)	Georgia (1–0) (50)	Georgia (2–0) (44)	Texas (3–0) (26)	Texas (4–0) (36)	Alabama (4–0) (28)	Texas (5–0) (47)	Texas (6–0) (47)	Oregon (7–0) (44)	Oregon (8–0) (49)	Oregon (9–0) (51)	Oregon (10–0) (53)	Oregon (11–0) (52)	Oregon (11–0) (52)	Oregon (12–0) (53)	Oregon (13–0) (52)	1.
2.	Ohio State (11)	Ohio State (1–0) (3)	Texas (2–0) (8)	Georgia (3–0) (24)	Georgia (3–0) (16)	Texas (5–0) (22)	Ohio State (5–0) (7)	Oregon (6–0) (7)	Georgia (6–1) (10)	Georgia (6–1) (5)	Georgia (7–1) (3)	Ohio State (8–1) (1)	Ohio State (9–1) (2)	Ohio State (10–1) (2)	Texas (11–1) (1)	Georgia (11–2) (1)	2.
3.	Texas (2)	Texas (1–0) (1)	Ohio State (2–0) (2)	Ohio State (2–0) (4)	Ohio State (3–0) (2)	Ohio State (4–0) (3)	Oregon (5–0)	Ohio State (5–1)	Penn State (6–0)	Penn State (7–0)	Ohio State (7–1)	Texas (8–1)	Texas (9–1)	Texas (10–1)	Penn State (11–1)	Notre Dame (11–1)	3.
4.	Oregon (1)	Alabama (1–0)	Alabama (2–0)	Alabama (3–0)	Alabama (3–0)	Tennessee (4–0) (1)	Georgia (4–1)	Penn State (6–0)	Ohio State (6–1)	Ohio State (6–1)	Miami (FL) (9–0)	Indiana (10–0)	Indiana (10–0)	Penn State (10–1)	Notre Dame (11–1)	Texas (11–2) (1)	4.
5.	Alabama	Notre Dame (1–0)	Ole Miss (2–0)	Ole Miss (3–0)	Tennessee (4–0)	Georgia (3–1)	Penn State (5–0)	Georgia (5–1)	Miami (FL) (7–0)	Miami (FL) (8–0)	Texas (7–1)	Tennessee (8–1)	Penn State (9–1)	Notre Dame (10–1)	Georgia (10–2)	Ohio State (10–2)	5.
6.	Ole Miss	Oregon (1–0)	Miami (FL) (2–0)	Tennessee (3–0)	Ole Miss (4–0)	Oregon (4–0)	Miami (FL) (6–0)	Miami (FL) (6–0)	Texas (6–1)	Texas (7–1)	Penn State (7–1)	Penn State (8–1)	Alabama (8–2)	Georgia (9–2)	Tennessee (10–2)	Penn State (11–2)	6.
7.	Penn State	Penn State (1–0)	Tennessee (2–0)	Miami (FL) (3–0)	Miami (FL) (4–0)	Penn State (4–0)	Alabama (4–1)	Alabama (5–1)	Tennessee (6–1)	Tennessee (6–1)	Tennessee (7–1)	BYU (9–0)	Notre Dame (9–1)	Miami (FL) (10–1)	Ohio State (10–2)	Tennessee (10–2)	7.
8.	Notre Dame	Ole Miss (1–0)	Penn State (2–0)	Oregon (3–0)	Oregon (3–0)	Miami (FL) (5–0)	Tennessee (4–1)	Clemson (5–1)	Clemson (6–1)	Clemson (6–1)	Indiana (9–0)	Alabama (7–2)	Georgia (8–2)	Tennessee (9–2)	SMU (11–1)	Indiana (11–1)	8.
9.	Florida State	Michigan (1–0)	USC (2–0)	Penn State (2–0)	Penn State (3–0)	Missouri (4–0)	Ole Miss (5–1)	Tennessee (5–1)	LSU (6–1)	Texas A&M (7–1)	Notre Dame (7–1)	Notre Dame (8–1)	Ole Miss (8–2)	Indiana (10–1)	Indiana (11–1)	Boise State (12–1)	9.
10.	Michigan (2)	Miami (FL) (1–0)	Oregon (2–0)	USC (2–0)	Utah (4–0)	Michigan (4–1)	Clemson (4–1)	LSU (5–1)	Iowa State (6–1)	Notre Dame (7–1)	BYU (8–0)	Ole Miss (8–2)	Miami (FL) (9–1)	SMU (10–1)	Boise State (11–1)	Arizona State (11–2)	10.
11.	Missouri	Missouri (1–0)	Missouri (2–0)	Missouri (3–0)	Missouri (4–0)	USC (3–1)	Notre Dame (4–1)	Iowa State (6–0)	BYU (7–0)	BYU (8–0)	Alabama (6–2)	Georgia (7–2)	Tennessee (8–2)	Boise State (10–1)	Alabama (9–3)	Alabama (9–3)	11.
12.	LSU	USC (1–0)	Utah (2–0)	Utah (3–0)	Michigan (3–1)	Ole Miss (4–1)	Iowa State (5–0)	Notre Dame (5–1)	Indiana (7–0)	Indiana (8–0)	SMU (8–1)	Miami (FL) (9–1)	SMU (9–1)	Clemson (9–2)	Miami (FL) (10–2)	SMU (11–2)	12.
13.	Utah	Utah (1–0)	Oklahoma (2–0)	Oklahoma (3–0)	USC (2–1)	Clemson (3–1)	LSU (4–1)	BYU (6–0)	Notre Dame (6–1)	Iowa State (7–0)	Boise State (7–1)	SMU (8–1)	Boise State (9–1)	Alabama (8–3)	Arizona State (10–2)	Clemson (10–3)	13.
14.	Tennessee	Tennessee (1–0)	Oklahoma State (2–0)	Kansas State (3–0)	Louisville (3–0)	LSU (4–1)	BYU (5–0)	Texas A&M (5–1)	Texas A&M (6–1)	Alabama (6–2)	Ole Miss (7–2)	Boise State (8–1)	BYU (9–1)	Arizona State (9–2)	South Carolina (9–3)	Ole Miss (9–3)	14.
15.	Clemson	Oklahoma (1–0)	Kansas State (2–0)	Oklahoma State (3–0)	LSU (3–1)	Notre Dame (4–1)	Texas A&M (4–1)	Indiana (6–0)	Alabama (5–2)	Pittsburgh (7–0)	Texas A&M (7–2)	Texas A&M (7–2)	Texas A&M (8–2)	Ole Miss (8–3)	Ole Miss (9–3)	South Carolina (9–3)	15.
16.	Oklahoma	Oklahoma State (1–0)	Michigan (1–1)	LSU (2–1)	Clemson (2–1)	Iowa State (4–0)	Indiana (6–0)	Ole Miss (5–2)	Ole Miss (5–2)	LSU (6–2)	LSU (6–2)	Clemson (7–2)	Colorado (8–2)	South Carolina (8–3)	Iowa State (10–2)	Miami (FL) (10–2)	16.
	Preseason Aug 12	Week 1 Sep 3	Week 2 Sep 8	Week 3 Sep 15	Week 4 Sep 22	Week 5 Sep 29	Week 6 Oct 6	Week 7 Oct 13	Week 8 Oct 20	Week 9 Oct 27	Week 10 Nov 3	Week 11 Nov 10	Week 12 Nov 17	Week 13 Nov 24	Week 14 Dec 1	Week 15 (Final) Dec 8	
		Dropped: Florida State (0–2); LSU (0–1); Clemson (0–1)	Dropped: Notre Dame (1–1)	Dropped: Michigan (2–1)	Dropped: Kansas State (3–1); Oklahoma (3–1); Oklahoma State (3–1)	Dropped: Utah (4–1); Louisville (3–1)	Dropped: Missouri (4–1); Michigan (4–2); USC (3–2)	None	None	Dropped: Ole Miss (6–2)	Dropped: Clemson (6–2); Iowa State (7–1); Pittsburgh (7–1)	Dropped: LSU (6–3)	Dropped: Clemson (8–2)	Dropped: BYU (9–2); Texas A&M (8–3); Colorado (8–3)	Dropped: Clemson (9–3)	Dropped: Iowa State (10–3)	
