= Taylor Mouser =

American football player and coach (born 1991)

Current position
- Title: Offensive coordinator
- Team: Penn State
- Conference: Big Ten

Biographical details
- Born: April 9, 1991 (age 35)
- Education: Adams State University (2013)

Playing career
- 2009–2013: Adams State
- Position: Defensive line

Coaching career (HC unless noted)
- 2015: Toledo (GA)
- 2016: Iowa State (GA)
- 2017–2018: Iowa State (ADOS)
- 2019–2020: Iowa State (SQC-Off)
- 2021–2022: Iowa State (TE)
- 2023: Iowa State (TE/AHC)
- 2024–2025: Iowa State (OC/TE)
- 2026–present: Penn State (OC/TE)

Taylor Mouser (born April 9, 1991) is an American football coach who is currently the offensive coordinator for the Penn State Nittany Lions.

== Coaching career ==
=== Toledo ===
Mouser got his first coaching job in 2015 as a graduate assistant for the Toledo Rockets.

=== Iowa State ===
In 2016, Mouser was hired by the Cyclones as a graduate assistant. In 2017, Mouser become the Cyclones assistant director of scouting. Then in 2019, Mouser would again change roles this time becoming an offensive quality control coach. In 2021, Mouser was promoted to become the Iowa State tight ends coach. In 2024, Mouser was promoted again by the Cyclones to be the team's offensive coordinator and tight ends coach. In 2024, he helped the Cyclones program get off to its best start since 1938 where they finished the season with 11 wins for the first time ever in program history.
