= Elijah Arroyo =

American football player (born 2003)

No. 18 – Seattle Seahawks
- Position: Tight end
- Roster status: Injured reserve

Personal information
- Born: April 5, 2003 (age 23); Orlando, Florida, U.S.
- Listed height: 6 ft 5 in (1.96 m)
- Listed weight: 254 lb (115 kg)

Career information
- High school: Independence (Frisco, Texas)
- College: Miami (FL) (2021–2024)
- NFL draft: 2025: 2nd round, 50th overall pick

Career history
- Seattle Seahawks (2025–present)

Awards and highlights
- Super Bowl champion (LX); Second-team All-ACC (2024)

Career NFL statistics as of 2025
- Receptions: 15
- Receiving yards: 179
- Receiving touchdowns: 1
- Stats at Pro Football Reference

Elijah Arroyo (born April 5, 2003) is an American professional football tight end for the Seattle Seahawks of the National Football League (NFL). He played college football for the Miami Hurricanes and was selected by the Seahawks in the second round of the 2025 NFL draft.

== Early life ==
Arroyo was born on April 5, 2003, in Orlando, Florida, growing up in Palmetto Bay, Florida. At age seven, he and his family moved to Cancún, Mexico, for his father's job as a timeshare salesman. Arroyo moved back to the United States at age 13, attending Independence High School in Frisco, Texas. He had 48 receptions for 648 yards and five touchdowns his junior year and 28 receptions for 635 yards with 12 touchdowns as a senior. He committed to the University of Miami to play college football.

== College career ==
As a true freshman at Miami in 2021, Arroyo played in 12 games with one start and had five receptions for 86 yards and a touchdown. As a sophomore in 2022, he played in four games before suffering a season-ending injury. He finished with five receptions for 66 yards. After missing the start of the 2023 season due to the injury, Arroyo returned to play in four games and recorded one reception for 11 yards. He returned to Miami as a redshirt junior in 2024. On December 31, 2024, Arroyo announced that he would be entering the 2025 NFL draft.

== Professional career ==
Pre-draft measurables
Height	Weight	Arm length	Hand span	Wingspan	Bench press
6 ft 5 1/8 in (1.96 m)	250 lb (113 kg)	33 in (0.84 m)	10 in (0.25 m)	6 ft 9 7/8 in (2.08 m)	22 reps
All values from NFL Combine

Arroyo was selected by the Seattle Seahawks with the 50th pick in the second round of the 2025 NFL draft. In Week 9, against the Washington Commanders, he scored his first professional touchdown on a 26-yard reception. On December 13, 2025, Arroyo was placed on injured reserve due to a knee injury he suffered in Week 14 against the Atlanta Falcons. As a rookie, he finished with 15 receptions for 179 yards and one touchdown in 13 games. Arroyo was activated ahead of the team's NFC Championship matchup against the Los Angeles Rams. He was part of the Seahawks team that won Super Bowl LX over the New England Patriots, 29–13.

== NFL career statistics ==
Legend
Won the Super Bowl

=== Regular season ===
Year	Team	Games		Receiving					Fumbles	
Year	Team	GP	GS	Rec	Yds	Avg	Lng	TD	Fum	Lost
2025	SEA	13	4	15	179	11.9	32	1	1	1
Career		13	4	15	179	11.9	32	1	1	1

== Personal life ==
Arroyo is of Mexican descent.
