= 2022 Kansas Jayhawks football team =

American college football season

2022 Kansas Jayhawks football

Liberty Bowl, L 53–55 ^{3OT} vs. Arkansas
- Conference: Big 12 Conference
- Record: 6–7 (3–6 Big 12)
- Head coach: Lance Leipold (2nd season)
- Offensive coordinator: Andy Kotelnicki (2nd season)
- Offensive scheme: Pro spread
- Defensive coordinator: Brian Borland (2nd season)
- Base defense: 4–3
- Home stadium: David Booth Kansas Memorial Stadium

Uniform
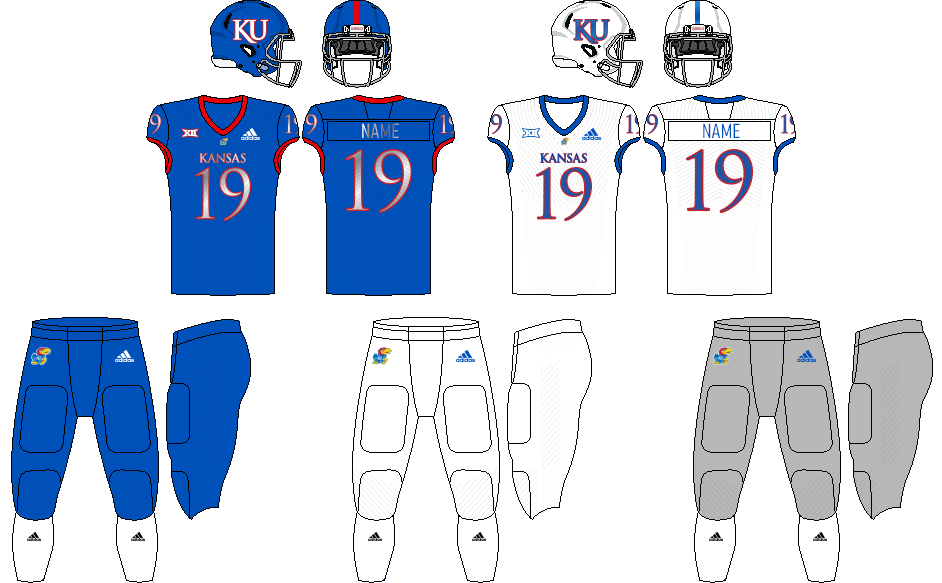

2022 Big 12 Conference football standings
	Conf.			Overall
Team	W		L	W		L
No. 2 TCU y^	9	–	0	13	–	2
No. 14 Kansas State y$	7	–	2	10	–	4
No. 25 Texas	6	–	3	8	–	5
Texas Tech	5	–	4	8	–	5
Oklahoma State	4	–	5	7	–	6
Baylor	4	–	5	6	–	7
Oklahoma	3	–	6	6	–	7
Kansas	3	–	6	6	–	7
West Virginia	3	–	6	5	–	7
Iowa State	1	–	8	4	–	8
Championship: Kansas State 31, TCU 28 ^{OT}
^ – College Football Playoff participant; $ – Conference champion; y – Championship game participant; Rankings from AP Poll

The 2022 Kansas Jayhawks football team represented the University of Kansas in the 2022 NCAA Division I FBS football season. It was the Jayhawks 133rd season. The Jayhawks played their home games at David Booth Kansas Memorial Stadium in Lawrence, Kansas, and competed in the Big 12 Conference. They were led by second-year head coach Lance Leipold. The Jayhawks finished the season 6–7 overall and 3–6 in the Big 12. They qualified for the 2022 Liberty Bowl where they lost to Arkansas.

The Jayhawks won their first two games to start the season 2–0 for the first time since 2011. With a win over West Virginia on September 10, the Jayhawks won their opening conference game of the season for the first time since a victory over Iowa State in 2009. After defeating Houston the following week, the Jayhawks improved to a 3–0 record, their best start since 2009. In the AP poll released on September 18, the Jayhawks received votes to be ranked for the first time since the 2009 season. Following what was at the time career highs in yards (324) and passing touchdowns (4) against Duke on September 23, some websites began calling junior quarterback Jalon Daniels a candidate for the Heisman Trophy. However, two weeks later he suffered a shoulder injury. The injury was initially reported as season ending, but Daniels denied the report. The Jayhawks' victory over Iowa State on October 1 gave the Jayhawks their second conference victory. It was the first time Kansas won more than one conference game since 2008, and marked their first five-game winning streak since 2009. That season was also the last time Kansas started 5–0. In the AP poll released on October 2, Kansas was ranked 19th, thereby earning an AP poll ranking for the first time since 2009. After losing back-to-back games, the Jayhawks fell out of the rankings. After defeating Oklahoma State for their sixth victory of the season, the Jayhawks became bowl eligible for the first time since 2008. The victory also gave the Jayhawks their first victory over an AP-ranked team since 2010 and their first ever victory over a team ranked in the College Football Playoff poll since it was first released in 2014.

The Jayhawks finished the season with three conference victories, the team's highest conference win total since 2008. The 2022 season was the first time Kansas did not finish last in the Big 12 since the 2014 season. Their eighth-place finish was the best the Jayhawks had finished since the Big 12 eliminated divisions after the 2010 season. The Jayhawks qualified for the 2022 Liberty Bowl but lost a triple-overtime game to Arkansas, 55–53. Daniels, who had returned from injury during the regular season, set a team record and a Liberty Bowl record by throwing for 544 yards in the loss.

== Offseason ==
=== Coaching staff changes ===
Name	Position	Replacement
Chevis Jackson	Cornerbacks	Jordan Peterson
Kwahn Drake	Defensive line	N/A*
N/A†	Defensive ends	Taiwo Onatolu
Emmett Jones	Wide receivers	Terrence Samuel
Jake Schoonover	Special teams coordinator	Terrence Samuel
N/A†	Defensive tackles	Jim Panagos
Travis Partridge	Offensive quality control	N/A*

*The Jayhawks do not have a coaching position with this exact title for the 2022 season
†The Jayhawks did not have a coaching position with this exact title in 2021

=== Starters lost ===
Overall, the Jayhawks had 25 players run out of eligibility. Below are the starters from 2021 who have run out of eligibility. Starters are based on players who started the final game of the 2021 season. Sixteen of 25 starters, including special teams, will return.

Name	Position
Kwamie Lassiter II	WR
Earl Bostick	OL
Chris Hughes	OL
Nate Betts	LB
Ricky Thomas	S
Jeremy Webb	S
Kyron Johnson	DE
Caleb Sampson	DT
Malcolm Lee	DT

=== Recruiting ===
The Jayhawks have 8 commitments for their 2022 recruiting class. Below is the breakdown. Rankings are as of May 18, 2022.

==== Overall class ranking ====
Website	Overall rank	Conference rank	4 star recruits	3 star recruits	1–2 star recruits	No star ranking
Rivals	N/A*	10	0	4	4	0
247 Sports	85	10	0	7	0	1

*Rivals only ranks the top 100 recruiting classes and the Jayhawks recruiting class is not in the top 100.

==== Highest rated recruit ====
College recruiting
Name	Hometown	School	Height	Weight	Commit date
Brian Dilworth; DB	Hollywood, FL	Chaminade-Madonna Prep	5 ft 10 in (1.78 m)	175 lb (79 kg)	Jan 23, 2022
Brian Dilworth; DB	Recruit ratings: Rivals: 247Sports: (NR)				

=== Notable transfers ===
Incoming

Name	Position	Previous school
Kalon Gervin	CB	Michigan State
Sevion Morrison	RB	Nebraska
Craig Young	S	Ohio State
Nolan Gorczyca	T	Buffalo
Eriq Gilyard	LB	UCF
Ky Thomas	RB	Minnesota
Deondre Doiron	DT	Buffalo
Douglas Emilien	WR	Minnesota
Lonnie Phelps	DE	Miami (OH)

Outgoing

Name	Position	New school
Miles Kendrick	QB	New Mexico
Conrad Hawley	QB	Iowa State*

*Hawley committed to play for Iowa State's basketball program and is not playing football at the school

== Big 12 media poll ==
The preseason poll was released on July 7, 2022. Kansas was picked last in the conference for the 12th consecutive season. First place votes are in parentheses.

Big 12 media poll
Predicted finish	Team	Points
1	Baylor (17)	365
2	Oklahoma (12)	354
3	Oklahoma State (9)	342
4	Texas (2)	289
5	Kansas State	261
6	Iowa State (1)	180
7	TCU	149
8	West Virginia	147
9	Texas Tech	119
10	Kansas	48

== Schedule ==
Date	Time	Opponent	Rank	Site	TV	Result	Attendance
September 2	7:00 pm	Tennessee Tech*		David Booth Kansas Memorial Stadium; Lawrence, KS	ESPN+	W 56–10	34,902
September 10	5:00 pm	at West Virginia		Milan Puskar Stadium; Morgantown, WV	ESPN+	W 55–42 ^{OT}	52,188
September 17	3:00 pm	at Houston*		TDECU Stadium; Houston, TX	ESPNU	W 48–30	30,317
September 24	11:00 am	Duke*		David Booth Kansas Memorial Stadium; Lawrence, KS	FS1	W 35–27	47,233
October 1	2:30 pm	Iowa State^{†}		David Booth Kansas Memorial Stadium; Lawrence, KS	ESPN2	W 14–11	47,233
October 8	11:00 am	No. 17 TCU	No. 19	David Booth Kansas Memorial Stadium; Lawrence, KS (College GameDay)	FS1	L 31–38	47,233
October 15	11:00 am	at Oklahoma	No. 19	Gaylord Family Oklahoma Memorial Stadium; Norman, OK	ESPN2	L 42–52	83,874
October 22	11:00 am	at Baylor		McLane Stadium; Waco, TX	ESPN2	L 23–35	45,882
November 5	2:30 pm	No. 18 Oklahoma State		David Booth Kansas Memorial Stadium; Lawrence, KS	FS1	W 37–16	43,606
November 12	6:00 pm	at Texas Tech		Jones AT&T Stadium; Lubbock, TX	ESPN+	L 28–43	55,613
November 19	2:30 pm	Texas		David Booth Kansas Memorial Stadium; Lawrence, KS	FS1	L 14–55	38,246
November 26	7:00 pm	at No. 12 Kansas State		Bill Snyder Family Football Stadium; Manhattan, KS (Sunflower Showdown)	FOX	L 27–47	51,861
December 28	4:30 pm	vs. Arkansas*		Simmons Bank Liberty Stadium; Memphis, TN (Liberty Bowl)	ESPN	L 53–55 ^{3OT}	52,847
*Non-conference game; ^{†}Homecoming; Rankings from AP Poll (and CFP Rankings, after November 1) - Released prior to game; All times are in Central time

== Roster ==
2022 Kansas Jayhawks Football
Quarterback: 6 Jalon Daniels Junior; 13 Jordan Preston (redshirt) Junior; 14 Kai Kunz Freshman; 15 Ethan Vasko Freshman; 16 Ben Easters (redshirt) Freshman; 17 Jason Bean (redshirt) Senior; 18 Jack Jackson Freshman; Running back: 4 Devin Neal Sophomore; 8 Ky Thomas (redshirt) Sophomore; 12 Torry Locklin (redshirt) Junior; 20 Daniel Hishaw Jr. (redshirt) Sophomore; 26 Jack Codwell (redshirt) Sophomore; 28 Sevion Morrison (redshirt) Sophomore; 32 Tylan Alejos Freshman; 33 Spencer Roe FB (redshirt) Senior; 36 DeAndre Thomas Jr. (redshirt) Freshman; Wide receiver: 2 Lawrence Arnold (redshirt) Sophomore; 3 Tanaka Scott (redshirt) Freshman; 5 Douglas Emilien (redshirt) Sophomore; 11 Luke Grimm Junior; 19 Steven McBride Junior; 80 Cole Rhoden Freshman; 81 Quinton Conley Freshman; 82 Griffin Koch Freshman; 83 Quentin Skinner (redshirt) Sophomore; 84 Kevin Terry (redshirt) Junior; 85 Kelan Robinson (redshirt) Freshman; Tight end: 43 Max Dowling Freshman; 45 Trevor Kardell (redshirt) Sophomore; 47 Jared Casey (redshirt) Sophomore; 49 Mack Moeller (redshirt) Freshman; 86 Mac Copeland (redshirt) Senior; 87 Will Huggins (redshirt) Sophomore; 88 Tevita Noa Junior; 89 Mason Fairchild Senior	Offensive line: 50 Mike Novitsky (redshirt) Senior; 54 Michael Ford Jr. (redshirt) Sophomore; 55 Armaj Reed-Adams (redshirt) Sophomore; 57 Hank Kelly (redshirt) Freshman; 58 Kael Farkes Freshman; 59 Nolan Gorczyca (redshirt) Freshman; 63 Jake Eisenhauer (redshirt) Freshman; 67 Dominick Puni (redshirt) Senior; 68 Earl Bostick Jr. Super-Senior; 69 Joe Krause (redshirt) Sophomore; 71 James Livingston Freshman; 72 Danny Robinson (redshirt) Sophomore; 74 De'Kedrick Sterns (redshirt) Freshman; 75 Jackson Satterwhite (redshirt) Sophomore; 77 Bryce Cabeldue (redshirt) Sophomore; 78 Joey Baker Freshman; Defensive ends: 33 D'Marion Alexander (redshirt) Freshman; 35 Zion DeBose Super-Senior; 37 Hayden Hatcher Senior; 45 Dean Miller Sophomore; 46 Davion Westmoreland Junior; 47 Lonnie Phelps (redshirt) Junior; 56 Parker Williams Freshman; 96 Cole Petrus (redshirt) Freshman; Defensive line: 11 Eddie Wilson Super-Senior; 52 D.J. Withers (redshirt) Freshman; 53 Caleb Taylor (redshirt) Sophomore; 90 Jereme Robinson Junior; 91 Jelani Arnold Super-Senior; 92 Tommy Dunn Jr. (redshirt) Freshman; 93 Sam Burt Super-Senior; 94 Andon Carpenter Freshman; 95 Ronald McGee Super-Senior; 97 Kenean Caldwell Junior; 98 Caleb Sampson Super-Senior; 99 Malcolm Lee Super-Senior	Linebackers: 6 Taiwan Berryhill Junior; 7 Lorenzo McCaskill Super-Senior; 12 Tristian Fletcher Sophomore; 13 Eriq Gilyard (redshirt) Senior; 15 Craig Young (redshirt) Junior; 19 Gavin Potter Senior; 20 Donovan Gaines (redshirt) Sophomore; 26 Krishawn Brown (redshirt) Sophomore; 30 Rich Miller Senior; 32 Dylan Downing (redshirt) Junior; 38 Ty Farrington Freshman; 39 Cole Mondi (redshirt) Freshman; 41 Ben Coates (redshirt) Sophomore; 44 Cornell Wheeler (redshirt) Sophomore; Cornerbacks: 2 Jacobee Bryant Sophomore; 3 Ra'Mello Dotson (redshirt) Sophomore; 8 Kwinton Lassiter (redshirt) Junior; 16 Shaad Dabney Sophomore; 18 Kalon Gervin (redshirt) Junior; 22 Brian Dilworth Freshman; 24 Monte' McGart Super-senior; 29 Jaden Robinson (redshirt) Freshman; Safeties: 0 Edwin White-Schultz Sophomore; 1 Kenny Logan Jr. Senior; 4 Marvin Grant (redshirt) Junior; 5 O.J. Burroughs Sophomore; 9 Jarrett Paul (redshirt) Senior; 10 Jayson Gilliom Sophomore; 14 Jalen Dye Sophomore; 23 Mason Ellis Freshman; 25 Kaleb Purdy Freshman; 27 Kenrick Osei-Bonsu Freshman; 31 Landon Nelson (redshirt) Freshman; 43 Andrew Russell Super-senior; Special teams: 24 Reis Vernon P Junior; 34 Owen Piepergerdes K (redshirt) Freshman; 37 Grayden Addison P (redshirt) Freshman; 40 Tabor Allen K Junior; 51 Emory Duggar LS (redshirt) Sophomore; 60 Luke Hosford LS (redshirt) Junior; 83 Jacob Borcila K (redshirt) Junior; Suspended: 7 Trevor Wilson WR (redshirt) Junior; Roster updated: September 10, 2022

== Coaching staff ==
Name	Position
Lance Leipold	Head coach
Andy Kotelnicki	Offensive coordinator
Brian Borland	Defensive coordinator
Jake Schoonover	Special teams coordinator
Jim Zebrowski	Quarterbacks
Terrence Samuel	Wide receivers/Special teams coordinator
Jonathan Wallace	Running backs
Jordan Peterson	Defensive backs
Taiwo Onatolu	Defensive ends
Scott Fuchs	Offensive line
Chris Simpson	Linebackers
Jim Panagos	Defensive tackles

== Game summaries ==
Rankings from AP poll until after November 5, after which, all rankings are College Football Playoff.

=== Tennessee Tech ===
Tennessee Tech Golden Eagles at Kansas Jayhawks

Quarter	1	2	3	4	Total
Golden Eagles	0	3	0	7	10
Jayhawks	21	14	7	14	56

at David Booth Kansas Memorial Stadium • Lawrence, Kansas

- Date: Friday, September 2, 2022
- Game time: 7:00 pm CDT
- Game weather: Clear • Temperature: 89 °F (32 °C)
- Game attendance: 34,902
- Referee: Michael Vandervelde
- TV announcers (ESPN+): Noah Reed, Jay Sonnhalter

Game information

First quarter

- 11:26 KU Devin Neal 19 yard rush (Jacob Borcila kick), 4-40, 01:53, KU 7–0
- 9:06 KU Daniel Hishaw 9 yard rush (Jacob Borcila kick), 2-65, 00:49, KU 14–0
- 4:42 KU Cobee Bryant 61 yard blocked field goal return (Jacob Borcila kick), KU 21–0

Second quarter

- 14:07 TTU Devin Parker 28 yd FG, 7-23, 03:14, KU 21–3
- 3:23 KU Jalon Daniels 11 yard rush (Jocob Borcila kick), 7-23, 3:14, KU 28–3
- 0:07 KU Mason Fairchild 2 yard pass from Jalon Daniels (Jacob Borcila kick), 7-63, 01:29, KU 35–3

Third quarter

- 4:21 KU Devin Neal 80 yard rush (Jacob Borcila kick), 1-80, 00:13, KU 42–3

Fourth quarter

- 13:25 KU Sevion Morrison 11 yard rush (Jacob Borcila kick), 4-76, 02:01, KU 49–3
- 9:46 KU Jason Bean 7 yard rush (Jacob Borcila kick), 4-25, 02:42, KU 56–3
- 5:00 TTU Heath Price 4 yard pass from Jeremiah Oatsvall (Devin Parker kick), 9-75, 04:46, KU 56–10

Statistics	TTU	KU
First downs	14	21
Plays–yards	69–190	49–502
Rushes–yards	43–93	30–297
Passing yards	97	205
Passing: comp–att–int	15–26–1	16–19–1
Turnovers		
Time of possession	35:36	24:24

Team	Category	Player	Statistics
Tennessee Tech	Passing	Jeremiah Oatsvall	10/18 76 yards 1 TD 1 INT
Tennessee Tech	Rushing	Jeremiah Oatsvall	12 carries 42 yards
Tennessee Tech	Receiving	Willie Miller	3 receptions 28 yards
Kansas	Passing	Jalon Daniels	15/18 189 yards 1 TD 1 INT
Kansas	Rushing	Devin Neal	4 carries 108 yards 2 TDs
Kansas	Receiving	Quentin Skinner	1 reception 56 yards

The Jayhawks hosted the Golden Eagles to open the season. After forcing a 3-and-out on defense to start the game, the Jayhawks only took 1:53 to score their first touchdown of the season. Following another 3-and-out from the defense, the Jayhawks would score again. Kansas would score 3 touchdowns before allowing one themselves. They would score 35 unanswered points before allowing another touchdown after the Jayhawks had pulled their starters out of the game. They would defeat Tennessee Tech 56-10 for their largest margin of victory since 2016 when they defeated Rhode Island 55–6.

=== At West Virginia ===
Kansas Jayhawks at West Virginia Mountaineers

Quarter	1	2	3	4	OT	Total
Jayhawks	0	21	14	7	13	55
Mountaineers	14	14	0	14	0	42

at Milan Puskar Stadium • Morgantown, West Virginia

- Date: Saturday, September 10, 2022
- Game time: 5:00 pm CDT
- Game weather: Cloudy • Temperature: 69 °F (21 °C)
- Game attendance: 52,188
- Referee: Kevin Mar
- TV announcers (ESPN+): Courtney Lyle, Forest Conoly

Game information

First quarter

- 13:19 WVU Sam James 59 yard pass from J. T. Daniels (Casey Legg kick), 4-75, 01:41 WVU 7–0
- 5:03 WVU C. J. Donaldson 1 yard rush (Casey Legg kick), 12-50, 05:45 WVU 14–0

Second quarter

- 14:57 KU Mason Fairchild 10 yard pass from Jalon Daniels (Jacob Borcila kick), 9-79, 05:01 WVU 14–7
- 13:15 WVU Bryce Ford-Wheaton 67 yard pass from J. T. Daniels (Casey Legg kick), 4-75, 01:42 WVU 21-7
- 8:26 KU Devin Neal 6 yard rush (Jacob Borcila kick), 11-75, 04:49 WVU 21–14
- 3:11 WVU Bryce Ford-Wheaton 5 yard pass from J. T. Daniels (Casey Legg kick), 11-75, 05:15 WVU 28–14
- 0:29 KU Devin Neal 17 yard pass from Jalon Daniels (Jacob Borcila kick), 10-75, 02:42 WVU 28–21

Third quarter

- 11:32 KU Daniel Hishaw 3 yard rush (Jacob Borcila kick), 8-75, 03:28 28–28
- 4:00 KU Devin Neal 2 yard rush (Jacob Borcila kick), 6-24, 03:00 KU 35–28

Fourth quarter

- 12:58 WVU Casey Legg 27 yd field goal, 13-65, 06:02 KU 35–31
- 10:59 KU Daniel Hishaw 30 yard rush (Jacob Borcila kick), 4-65, 01:56 KU 42–31
- 4:04 WVU Casey Legg 28 yard field goal, 14-64, 06:55 KU 42–34
- 0:35 WVU C. J. Donaldson 1 yard rush (Bryce Ford-Wheaton pass from J. T. Daniels), 12-85, 01:42 42–42

Overtime

- KU Quentin Skinner 4 yard pass from Jalon Daniels (Jacob Borcila kick), 5-25 KU 49–42
- KU Cobee Bryant 86 yard interception return KU 55–42

Statistics	KU	WVU
First downs	22	27
Plays–yards	65-419	78–501
Rushes–yards	36-200	38-146
Passing yards	219	355
Passing: comp–att–int	18–29–0	28–40–1
Turnovers		
Time of possession	28:33	31:27

Team	Category	Player	Statistics
Kansas	Passing	Jalon Daniels	17/28 215 yards 3 TD
Kansas	Rushing	Jalon Daniels	11 carries 82 yards
Kansas	Receiving	Luke Grimm	6 receptions 66 yards
West Virginia	Passing	JT Daniels	28/38 355 yards 3 TD 1 INT
West Virginia	Rushing	Tony Mathis Jr.	15 carries 54 yards
West Virginia	Receiving	Bryce Ford-Wheaton	11 receptions 154 yards

In the Jayhawks opening conference game, they began the game with a 14–0 deficit before scoring their first touchdown. West Virginia would respond with their own touchdown to take the 21–7 lead. Kansas would then go on a 35–10 run to take a 42–31 lead. The Mountaineers responded with a 11–0 run to tie the game and send it to overtime. The Jayhawks would strike first in overtime on offense. On the Mountaineers drive in overtime, Kansas cornerback Cobee Bryant intercepted J. T. Daniels pass and returned 86 yards for a touchdown to win 55–42. The win gave the Jayhawks a 2–0 record for the first time since 2011 and gave KU their first conference opener win since 2009.

=== At Houston ===
Kansas Jayhawks at Houston Cougars

Quarter	1	2	3	4	Total
Jayhawks	14	14	14	6	48
Cougars	14	0	13	3	30

at TDECU Stadium • Houston, Texas

- Date: Saturday, September 17, 2022
- Game time: 3:00 pm CDT
- Game weather: Sunny • Temperature: 91 °F (33 °C)
- Game attendance: 30,317
- Referee: Tuta Salaam
- TV announcers (ESPNU): Kevin Brown (play-by-play), Hutson Mason (analyst)

Game information

First quarter

- 10:01 HOU Ta'Zhawn Henry 34 yard pass from Clayton Tune (Bubba Baxa Kick), 9–82, 4:07, HOU 7–0
- 7:18 HOU Brandon Campbell 40 yard Run (Bubba Baxa Kick), 3–48, 1:08 HOU 14–0
- 2:43 KU Jalon Daniels 12 yard Run (Jacob Borcila Kick), 9–75, 4:35 HOU 14–7
- 1:06 KU Daniel Hishaw Jr. 8 yard Run (Jacob Borcila Kick), 1–8, 0:05, 14–14

Second quarter

- 9:01 KU Luke Grimm 5 yard pass from Jalon Daniels (Jacob Borcila Kick), 10–84, 5:06, KU 21–14
- 1:16 KU Torry Locklin 60 yard pass from Jalon Daniels (Jacob Borcila Kick), 7–97, 3:51, KU 28–14

Third quarter

- 10:30 HOU Ta'Zhawn Henry 1 yard Run (Bubba Baxa Kick), 10–69, 4:23, KU 28–21
- 4:24 KU Jalon Daniels 9 yard Run (Jacob Borcila Kick), 10–75, 6:06, KU 35–21
- 2:39 KU Jared Casey 8 yard pass from Jalon Daniels (Jacob Borcila Kick), 5–23, 1:35, KU 42–21
- 0:00 HOU Clayton Tune 14 yard Run (Bubba Baxa kick missed), 5–75, 2:39, KU 42–27

Fourth quarter

- 10:27 KU Jacob Borcila 22 yard Field Goal, 9–70, 4:33, KU 45–27
- 4:56 HOU Bubba Baxa 20 yard Field Goal, 13–72, 5:25, KU 45–30
- 3:05 KU Jacob Borcila 33 yard Field Goal, 5–31, 1:50

Statistics	KU	HOU
First downs	24	26
Plays–yards	64–440	70–446
Rushes–yards	41–282	39–174
Passing yards	158	272
Passing: comp–att–int	14–23–0	22–31–1
Turnovers		
Time of possession	31:27	28:33

Team	Category	Player	Statistics
Kansas	Passing	Jalon Daniels	14/23 158 yards 3 TDs
Kansas	Rushing	Jalon Daniels	12 carries 123 yards 2 TDs
Kansas	Receiving	Torry Locklin	1 reception 60 yards 1 TD
Houston	Passing	Clayton Tune	22/31 272 yards 1 TD 1 INT
Houston	Rushing	Clayton Tune	16 carries 63 yards 1 TD
Houston	Receiving	Ta'Zhawn Henry	5 receptions 107 yards 1 TD

In the Jayhawks first game against future Big 12 Conference opponent Houston since the 2005 Fort Worth Bowl, the Jayhawks began the game with a 14–0 deficit. The Jayhawks quickly rallied back, however, scoring 28 unanswered points to go into halftime 28–14. A lightning delay in the 2nd quarter caused halftime to be shortened to 15 minutes. Houston would go on a 10 play, 4:23 long drive for a touchdown to cut the lead to 28–21, but after a 6-minute, 75-yard drive for a touchdown the Kansas defense would force a turnover, a strip sack on Houston quarterback Clayton Tune, and on the ensuing drive the Jayhawks offense would put Kansas back up 42–21. Two Jacob Borcila field goals would put Kansas up by 18 late in the game, 48–30, giving Kansas their first back-to-back road victories since 2007, and their first 3–0 start since 2009.

=== Duke ===
Duke Blue Devils at Kansas Jayhawks

Quarter	1	2	3	4	Total
Blue Devils	7	6	0	14	27
Jayhawks	7	14	7	7	35

at David Booth Kansas Memorial Stadium • Lawrence, Kansas

- Date: Saturday, September 24, 2022
- Game time: 11:00 pm CDT
- Game weather: Sunny • Temperature: 72 °F (22 °C)
- Game attendance: 47,233
- Referee: Marcus Woods
- TV announcers (FS1): Eric Collins, Devin Gardner

Game information

First quarter

- 5:25 KU Trevor Kardell 6 yard pass from Jalon Daniels (Jacob Borcila Kick), 7–57 3:16, KU 7–0
- 3:40 DUK Jaylen Coleman 5 yard run (Charlie Ham Kick), 4–66 1:39, 7–7

Second quarter

- 12:35 KU Daniel Hishaw Jr. 73 yard pass from Jalon Daniels (Jacob Borcila Kick), 2–76 1:00, KU 14–7
- 6:17 DUK Charlie Ham 22 yard field goal, 12–70 6:18, KU 14–10
- 1:04 KU Luke Grimm 19 yard pass from Jalon Daniels (Jacob Borcila Kick), 11–75 5:13, KU 21–10
- 0:03 DUK Charlie Ham 37 yard field goal, 9–55 1:01, KU 21–13

Third quarter

- 8:25 KU Lawrence Arnold 36 yard pass from Jalon Daniels (Jacob Borcila Kick), 4–62 1:02, KU 28–13
- 8:54 DUK Jordan Waters 3 yard run (Charlie Ham Kick), 10–92 4:40, KU 28–20
- 4:42 KU Jalon Daniels 3 yard Run (Jacob Borcila Kick), 8–75 4:12, KU 35–20
- 2:40 DUK Jalon Calhoun 27 yard pass from Riley Leonard (Charlie Ham Kick), 7–70 1:07, KU 35–27

Statistics	DUK	KU
First downs	23	23
Plays–yards	71–463	63–528
Rushes–yards	35–139	39–204
Passing yards	324	324
Passing: comp–att–int	24–36–0	19–23–0
Turnovers		
Time of possession	30:28	29:32

Team	Category	Player	Statistics
Duke	Passing	Riley Leonard	24/35 324 yards 1 TD
Duke	Rushing	Riley Leonard	10 carries 54 yards
Duke	Receiving	Jalon Calhoun	5 receptions 93 yards 1 TD
Kansas	Passing	Jalon Daniels	19/23 324 yards 4 TDs
Kansas	Rushing	Jalon Daniels	11 carries 82 yards 1 TD
Kansas	Receiving	Lawrence Arnold	4 receptions 84 yards 1 TD

In a battle of unbeaten teams more known for their basketball programs, the Jayhawks took the early lead in front of their capacity sellout crowd. The teams would trade touchdowns including a 73-yard touchdown reception from Daniel Hishaw Jr., who would break multiple tackles on his way to the end zone. The Jayhawks would never trail in the game. Despite a late score from Duke, Kansas held on to win 35–27. Kansas quarterback Jalon Daniels would set career highs with 324 passing yards and 4 touchdowns with only 4 incompletions. The win moved Kansas to 4–0 for the first time since 2009 and would make them two wins away from being bowl eligible for the first time since 2008.

=== Iowa State ===
Iowa State Cyclones at Kansas Jayhawks

Quarter	1	2	3	4	Total
Cyclones	0	8	3	0	11
Jayhawks	0	14	0	0	14

at David Booth Kansas Memorial Stadium • Lawrence, Kansas

- Date: Saturday, October 1, 2022
- Game time: 2:30 pm CDT
- Game weather: Sunny • Temperature: 76 °F (24 °C)
- Game attendance: 47,233
- TV announcers (ESPN2): Brian Custer, Dustin Fox

Game information

First quarter

No scoring

Second quarter

- 11:30 KU Daniel Hishaw Jr. 4 yard run, (Jacob Borcila kick), 7–79 3:59, KU 7–0
- 5:25 KU Jalon Daniels 2 yard run, (Jacob Borcila kick), 4–19 2:31, KU 14–0
- 2:51 ISU Easton Dean 9 yard pass from Hunter Dekkers (Blake Clark run), 6–75 2:34, KU 14–8

Third quarter

- 5:27 ISU Jace Gilbert 35 yard field goal, 12–62 5:25, KU 14–11

Fourth quarter

No scoring

Statistics	ISU	KU
First downs	20	10
Plays–yards	78–313	46–213
Rushes–yards	30–26	31–112
Passing yards	287	101
Passing: comp–att–int	30–48–1	8–15–0
Turnovers		
Time of possession	35:02	24:58

Team	Category	Player	Statistics
Iowa State	Passing	Hunter Dekkers	30/48 287 yards 1 TD 1 INT
Iowa State	Rushing	Deon Silas	12 carries 29 yards
Iowa State	Receiving	Xavier Hutchinson	13 receptions 101 yards
Kansas	Passing	Jalon Daniels	7/14 93 yards
Kansas	Rushing	Devin Neal	12 carries 75 yards
Kansas	Receiving	Luke Grimm	4 receptions 46 yards

The Jayhawks faced the Cyclones in what would prove to be a defensive battle. The Jayhawks held the Cyclones to only 11 points, their lowest point total allowed in a conference game since 2018. The Jayhawks were held to their lowest point total of the season as quarterback Jalon Daniels, who entered the game considered a Heisman Trophy candidate, was held to only 93 yards. Kansas started the game up 14–0 before allowing 11 unanswered points. Iowa State kicker Jace Gilbert missed 3 field goals, including a potential game-tying field goal with only 27 seconds left in the game. The win moved the Jayhawks to a 5–0 record and gave the Jayhawks their second conference victory, their first time winning more than a single conference game since 2008. The game would be the final game in a stretch of 151 consecutive games the Jayhawks would play as unranked team.

=== No. 17 TCU ===
No. 17 TCU Horned Frogs at No. 19 Kansas Jayhawks

Quarter	1	2	3	4	Total
No. 17 Horned Frogs	3	7	21	7	38
No. 19 Jayhawks	0	3	21	7	31

at David Booth Kansas Memorial Stadium • Lawrence, Kansas

- Date: Saturday, October 8, 2022
- Game time: 11:00 am CDT
- Game weather: Sunny • Temperature: 56 °F (13 °C)
- Game attendance: 47,233
- Referee: Steve Baron
- TV announcers (FS1): Jason Benetti, Brock Huard

Game information

First quarter

- TCU 10:46 Griffin Kell 39 yard field goal, 10–57 yards 4:10 TCU 3–0

Second quarter

- TCU 3:26 Kendre Miller 1 yard run (Griffin Kell kick) 6–99 yards 2:36, 10–0 TCU
- KU 0:36 Jacob Borcila 40 yard field goal 8–53 2:50, 10–3 TCU

Third quarter

- KU 12:59 Jason Bean 12 yard pass Mason Fairchild, (Jacob Borcila kick) 4–75 2:01, 10–10
- KU 7:36 Jason Bean 8 yard pass to Luke Grimm (Jacob Borcila kick) 5–40 2:06, KU 17–10
- TCU 6:29 Max Duggan 51 yard pass to Derius Davis (Griffin Kell kick) 4–61 yards 1:03 17–17
- TCU 3:59 Max Duggan 3 yard run (Griffin Kell kick) 5–26 yards 1:00 TCU 24–17
- KU 1:50 Jason Bean 38 yard pass to Quentin Skinner (Jacob Borcila kick) 4–72 2:05 24–24
- TCU 0:23 Max Duggan 25 yard pass to Taye Barber (Griffin Kell kick) 5–50 1:27 TCU 31–24

Fourth quarter

- KU 4:21 Jason Bean 29 yard pass to Quentin Skinner (Jacob Borcila kick) 4–61 2:19 31–31
- TCU 1:36 Max Duggan 24 yard pass to Quentin Johnston (Griffin Kell kick) 6–68 2:36 TCU 38–31

Statistics	TCU	KU
First downs	21	22
Plays–yards	64–452	72–540
Rushes–yards	31–144	38–189
Passing yards	308	351
Passing: comp–att–int	23–33–1	24–31–1
Turnovers		
Time of possession	26:01	33:59

Team	Category	Player	Statistics
TCU	Passing	Max Duggan	23/33 308 yards 3 TDs 1 INT
TCU	Rushing	Kendre Miller	18 carries 88 yards 1 TD
TCU	Receiving	Quentin Johnston	14 receptions 206 yards 1 TD
Kansas	Passing	Jason Bean	16/24 262 yards 4 TDs 1 INT
Kansas	Rushing	Devin Neal	15 carries 88 yards
Kansas	Receiving	Quentin Skinner	4 receptions 98 yards

Kansas was featured on ESPN's College GameDay for the first time since 2007 and hosted for the first time ever in their first game as a ranked team since 2009. TCU would start with a 10–0 lead. Late in the 2nd quarter on a drive that led to a field goal, Jayhawks' starting quarterback Jalon Daniels injured his shoulder. He would not return to the game. In the 3rd quarter, both teams would combine for 42 points as TCU would take a 31–24 lead into the fourth quarter. TCU would score what would prove to be the game-winning touchdown with 1:36 left in the game as the Jayhawks suffered their first loss of the season. The loss moved the Jayhawks losing streak against teams ranked in the AP poll to 45.

=== At Oklahoma ===
No. 19 Kansas Jayhawks at Oklahoma Sooners

Quarter	1	2	3	4	Total
No. 19 Jayhawks	14	7	7	14	42
Sooners	14	21	14	3	52

at Gaylord Family Oklahoma Memorial Stadium • Norman, Oklahoma

- Date: Saturday, October 15, 2022
- Game time: 11:00 pm CDT
- Game weather: Sunny • Temperature: 72 °F (22 °C)
- Game attendance: 83,874
- Referee: Daniel Alvarez
- TV announcers (ESPN2): Dave Flemming, Rod Gilmore

Game information

First quarter

- 12:14 OU Jovantae Barnes 1 yard rush (Zach Schmit kick), 10-79, 2:41 OU 7–0
- 9:35 KU Jason Bean 39 yard pass to Lawrence Arnold (Jacob Borcila kick), 6-75, 2:39 7–7
- 7:13 OU Eric Gray 2 yard rush (Zach Schmit kick), 9-75, 2:22 OU 14–7
- 2:39 KU Devin Neal 11 yard rush (Jacob Borcila kick), 9-65, 4:28 14–14

Second quarter

- 14:26 OU Jovantae Barnes 6 yard rush (Zach Schmit kick), 5-80, 0:57 OU 21–14
- 5:42 OU Dillon Gabriel 24 yard pass to Theo Wease (Zach Schmit kick), 7-65, 2:12 OU 28–14
- 2:40 OU Eric Gray 28 yd rush (Zach Schmit kick), 3-54, 0:49 OU 35–14
- 1:36 KU Jason bean 18 yard pass to Mason Fairchild (Jacob Borcila kick), 4-75, 1:04 OU 35–21

Third quarter

- 10:16 OU Dillon Gabriel 1 yard rush (Zach Schmit kick), 9-47, 2:33 OU 42–21
- 5:56 KU Jason Bean 28 yard pass to Lawrence Arnold (Jacob Borcila kick), 3-47, 0:53 OU 42–28
- 2:36 OU Dillon Gabriel 26 yard pass to Brayden Willis(Zach Schmit kick), 10-75, 3:20 OU 49–28

Fourth quarter

- 10:33 KU Ky Thomas 1 yard rush (Jacob Borcila kick), 7-28, 3:36 OU 49–35
- 5:18 OU Zach Schmit 37 yard field goal, 16-55, 5:15 OU 52–35
- 3:31 KU Jason Bean 9 yard pass to Mason Fairchild (Jacob Borcila kick), 7-75, 1:47 OU 52–42

Statistics	KU	OU
First downs	22	36
Plays–yards	62–430	99–701
Rushes–yards	35–165	57–298
Passing yards	265	403
Passing: comp–att–int	16–27–2	29–42–1
Turnovers		
Time of possession	29:41	30:19

Team	Category	Player	Statistics
Kansas	Passing	Jason Bean	16/27 265 yards 4 TDs 2 INTs
Kansas	Rushing	Devin Neal	12 carries 84 yards 1 TD
Kansas	Receiving	Lawrence Arnold	5 receptions 113 yards 2 TDs
Oklahoma	Passing	Dillon Gabriel	29/42 403 yards 2 TDs 1 INT
Oklahoma	Rushing	Eric Gray	20 carries 176 yards 2 TDs
Oklahoma	Receiving	Marvin Mims	9 receptions 106 yards

The game began as a shootout, with both teams trading touchdowns for the first 15 minutes of the game. After that, Oklahoma would score 21 unanswered points to take a 35–14 lead. The Jayhawks would score a touchdown shortly before the half. The Jayhawks and Sooners would trade touchdowns in the 2nd half before Oklahoma was held to a field goal. The Jayhawks responded with a touchdown but failed to recover the onside kick as the Jayhawks would lose their second consecutive game after starting 5–0. The Jayhawks gave up 701 yards and 51 points to the Sooners in a game where the final score depicted the game being closer than it actually was.

=== At Baylor ===
Kansas Jayhawks at Baylor Bears

Quarter	1	2	3	4	Total
Jayhawks	3	0	7	13	23
Bears	14	14	0	7	35

at McLane Stadium • Waco, Texas

- Date: Saturday, October 22, 2022
- Game time: 11:00 pm CDT
- Game weather: Sunny • Temperature: 75 °F (24 °C)
- Game attendance: 48,822
- Referee: Michael Vandervelde
- TV announcers (ESPN2): Anish Shroff, Brock Osweiler

Game information

First quarter

- 11:05 BU Blake Shapen 17 yard pass to Monaray Baldwin (John Mayers kick), 7–41 02:52, BU 7–0
- 10:15 BU 29 Richard Reese 14 yard rush (John Mayers kick), 2–25 0:40, BU 14–0
- 3:13 KU Jacob Borcila 30 yard field goal, 12–62 7:02, BU 14–3

Second quarter

- 11:18 BU 15 Kyron Drones 4 yard rush (John Mayers kick), 16–73 6:55, BU 21–3
- 0:42 BU Jordan Nabors 10 yard rush (John Mayers kick), 15–99 07:23, BU 28–3

Third quarter

- 7:35 KU Devin Neal 2 yard rush (Jacob Borcila kick), 3–9 1:07, BU 28–10

Fourth quarter

- 14:33 KU Jason Bean 24 yard pass to Quentin Skinner (Jason Bean pass to Mason Fairchild failed), 11–95, 4:07 BU 28–16
- 6:29 KU Jason Bean 4 yard rush (Jacob Borcila kick), 8–93, 2:56, BU 28–23
- 2:37 BU Richard Reese 2 yard rush (John Mayers kick), 7–69 3:52, BU 35–23

Statistics	KU	BU
First downs	11	28
Plays–yards	49–288	83–437
Rushes–yards	22–56	57–273
Passing yards	232	164
Passing: comp–att–int	16–27–1	17–26–2
Turnovers		
Time of possession	19:50	40:10

Team	Category	Player	Statistics
Kansas	Passing	Jason Bean	16/27 232 yards 1 TD
Kansas	Rushing	Devin Neal	10 carries 32 yards 1 TD
Kansas	Receiving	Quentin Skinner	4 receptions 66 yards 1 TD
Baylor	Passing	Blake Shapen	17/26 164 yards 1 TD 2 INTs
Baylor	Rushing	Richard Reese	31 carries 186 yards 2 TDs
Baylor	Receiving	Hal Presley	3 receptions 39 yards

The Jayhawks got into an early 28–3 due to a bad punt, a turnover, and poor play defensively. The Jayhawks would go on a 20–0 run to make the game 28–23 with 6:29 left in the game. Baylor would score with 2:39 left ending the Jayhawks comeback bid. The loss would be the 3rd straight for Kansas as KU would fail to win their 6th game for bowl eligibility.

=== No. 18 Oklahoma State ===
No. 18 Oklahoma State Cowboys at Kansas Jayhawks

Quarter	1	2	3	4	Total
No. 18 Cowboys	0	7	3	6	16
Jayhawks	10	14	7	6	37

at David Booth Kansas Memorial Stadium • Lawrence, Kansas

- Date: Saturday, November 5, 2022
- Game time: 2:30 pm CDT
- Game weather: Sunny • Temperature: 56 °F (13 °C)
- Game attendance: 43,606
- Referee: Daniel Alvarez
- TV announcers (FS1): Tim Brando, Spencer Tillman

Game information

First quarter

- KU 11:21 Devin Neal 31 yard Run (Jacob Borcila kick), 4–73 1:32, KU 7–0
- KU 0:09 Jacob Borcila 21 yard field goal, 16–76 6:09, KU 10–0

Second quarter

- OSU 9:59 from Garret Rangel 8 yard pass Stephon Johnson Jr. (Tanner Brown kick) 15–75 5:10, KU 10–7
- KU 9:10 Jason Bean 73 yard run (Jacob Borcila kick) 2–75 0:49, KU 17–7
- KU 0:22 Jason Bean 8 yard pass to Lawrence Arnold (Jacob Borcila kick) 7–87 3:04, KU 24–7

Third quarter

- KU 7:08 Jason Bean 2 yard pass to Jared Casey (Jacob Borcila kick) 15–75 7:52, KU 31–7
- OSU 3:27 Tanner Brown 35 yard field goal 11–54 3:41, KU 31–10

Fourth quarter

- KU 12:52 Jacob Borcila 20 yard field goal 10–72 5:35, KU 34–10
- OSU 9:21 Garret Rangel 35 yard pass to Jaden Nixon (John Paul Richardson rush failed) 10–75 3:31, KU 34–16
- KU 5:00 Jacob Borcila 31 yard field goal 7–64 4:16, KU 37–16

Statistics	OSU	KU
First downs	25	23
Plays–yards	75–415	69–554
Rushes–yards	35–111	46–351
Passing yards	304	203
Passing: comp–att–int	27–40–3	18–23–0
Turnovers		
Time of possession	24:51	35:09

Team	Category	Player	Statistics
Oklahoma State	Passing	Garret Rangel	27/40 304 yards 2 TDs 3 INTs
Oklahoma State	Rushing	Dominic Richardson	14 carries 51 yards
Oklahoma State	Receiving	Bryson Green	9 receptions 105 yards
Kansas	Passing	Jason Bean	18/23 203 yards 2 TD
Kansas	Rushing	Devin Neal	32 carries 224 yards 1 TD
Kansas	Receiving	Devin Neal	6 receptions 110 yards

The Jayhawks jumped out to a 31–7 lead in the game early in the 3rd quarter. Oklahoma State would score a field goal and touchdown but missed a two-point conversion attempt to make it 34–16. KU would finish with another field goal. The victory was the Jayhawks first win over an AP ranked team since 2010, the first win by KU over OSU since 2007, and the first win by KU over OSU at home since 1994. It was also their largest victory over a ranked team since they defeated 15th ranked Oklahoma 38–17 in 1995. The win made Kansas bowl eligible for the first time since 2008.

=== At Texas Tech ===
Kansas Jayhawks at Texas Tech Red Raiders

Quarter	1	2	3	4	Total
Jayhawks	7	14	0	7	28
Red Raiders	17	10	0	16	43

at Jones AT&T Stadium • Lubbock, Texas

- Date: Saturday, November 12, 2022
- Game time: 12:00 pm CST
- Game weather: Clear • Temperature: 50 °F (10 °C)
- Game attendance: 55,613
- Referee: Kevin Mar
- TV announcers (ESPN+): Courtney Lyle, Ryan Leaf

Game information

First quarter

- TTU 11:51 Donovan Smith 6 yard run (Trey Wolff kick) 8–75 3:09, TTU 7–0
- KU 9:40 Jason Bean 66 yard pass to Jared Casey (Jacob Borcila kick) 4–75 2:11, 7–7
- TTU 5:53 Trey Wolff 33 yard field goal 2–60 3:47, TTU 10–7
- TTU 0:48 SaRodorick Thompson 36 yard run (Trey Wolff kick) 6–76 2:26, TTU 17–7

Second quarter

- TTU 9:36 Tyler Shough 1 yard pass to Mason Tharp (Trey Wolff kick) 12–61 3:51, TTU 24–7
- KU 5:44 Jason Bean 16 yard run (Jacob Borcila kick) 7–77 3:52, TTU 24–14
- KU 2:31 Jason Bean 3 yard pass to Luke Grimm (Jacob Borcila kick) 4–73 1:47, TTU 24–21
- TTU 0:00 Trey Wolff 51 yard field goal 3–35 0:10 TTU 27–21

Third quarter

No scoring

Fourth quarter

- TTU 14:52 Tyler Shough 9 yard run (Tyler Shough run no good) 9–79 3:40, TTU 33–21
- KU 8:06 Jason Bean 20 yard pass Quentin Skinner (Jacob Borcila kick) 6–60 1:38, TTU 33–28
- TTU 4:19 Trey Wolff 30 yard field goal 9–63 3:47, TTU 36–28
- TTU 3:33 Tahj Brooks 5 yard run (Trey Wolff kick) 3–8 YARDS 0:36, TTU 43–28

Statistics	KU	TTU
First downs	30	26
Plays–yards	65–525	82–510
Rushes–yards	32–242	48–264
Passing yards	283	246
Passing: comp–att–int	20–33–1	20–34–0
Turnovers		
Time of possession	28:33	31:27

Team	Category	Player	Statistics
Kansas	Passing	Jason Bean	17/28 270 yards 3 TDs 1 INT
Kansas	Rushing	Devin Neal	24 carries 190 yards
Kansas	Receiving	Lawrence Arnold	4 receptions 110 yards
Texas Tech	Passing	Tyler Shough	20/33 246 yards 1 TD
Texas Tech	Rushing	Tyler Shough	12 carries 76 yards
Texas Tech	Receiving	Xavier White	4 receptions 70 yards

The Jayhawks had an early 24–7 hole. They would make the game 27–21 by halftime. However, Kansas kicker Jacob Borcilla missed two field goals, 1 in the first quarter and 1 in the 3rd, that would have made the game tied at 27–27. Kansas wouldn't be able to complete the comeback, losing 43–28.

=== Texas ===
Texas Longhorns at Kansas Jayhawks

Quarter	1	2	3	4	Total
Longhorns	14	17	10	14	55
Jayhawks	0	0	7	7	14

at David Booth Kansas Memorial Stadium • Lawrence, Kansas

- Date: Saturday, November 19, 2022
- Game time: 2:30 pm CST
- Game weather: Sunny • Temperature: 36 °F (2 °C) • Wind: NW 15 miles per hour (24 km/h)
- Game attendance: 38,246
- Referee: Kevin Boitmann
- TV announcers (FS1): Noah Eagle, Mark Helfrich

Game information

First quarter

- UT 7:50 Bijan Robinson 2 yard run (Bert Auburn kick) 9–68 yards 3:58, UT 7–0
- UT 5:33 Bijan Robinson 17 yard run (Bert Auburn kick) 2–28 0:26, UT 14–0

Second quarter

- UT 12:18 Bert Auburn 28 yard field goal 12–46 yards 4:40, UT 17–0
- UT 4:56 Quinn Ewers 15 yard pass to Keilan Robinson (Bert Auburn kick) 7–80 2:27, UT 24–0
- UT 0:00 Bijan Robinson 1 yard run (Bert Auburn kick) 9–60 2:08, UT 31–0

Third quarter

- UT 11:03 Bijan Robinson 32 yard run (Bert Auburn kick) 5–61 yards 1:51, UT 38–0
- UT 5:16 Bert Auburn 40 yard field goal 10–28 yards 4:12, UT 45–0
- KU 1:55 Jalon Daniels 14 yard pass to Torry Locklin (Owen Piepergerdes kick) 7–80 yards 3:16, UT 45–7

Fourth quarter

- UT 11:36 Jonathon Brooks 3 yard run (Bert Auburn kick) 12–65 5:11, UT 48–7
- KU 10:33 Jalon Daniels 12 yards pass to Luke Grimm (Owen Piepergerdes kick) 4–74 0:59, UT 48–14
- UT 9:09 Jonathan Brooks 70 yard run (Bert Auburn kick) 3–75 1:24, UT 55–14

Statistics	UT	KU
First downs	28	15
Plays–yards	79–539	59–346
Rushes–yards	57–427	30–104
Passing yards	112	242
Passing: comp–att–int	13–22–0	18–29–1
Turnovers		
Time of possession	31:58	28:02

Team	Category	Player	Statistics
Texas	Passing	Quinn Ewers	12/21 107 yards 1 TD
Texas	Rushing	Bijan Robinson	25 carries 243 yards 4 TDs
Texas	Receiving	Jordan Whittington	6 receptions 56 yards
Kansas	Passing	Jalon Daniels	17/26 230 yards 2 TDs 1 INT
Kansas	Rushing	Devin Neal	13 carries 51 yards
Kansas	Receiving	Quentin Skinner	4 receptions 98 yards

Kansas quarterback Jalon Daniels returned after missing the previous 6 games due to a shoulder injury. However, the Jayhawks struggling defense failed to stop Texas running back Bijan Robinson who would score 4 touchdowns. The Jayhawks wouldn't score until late in the 3rd quarter after allowing 45 unanswered points. The Jayhawks allowed 539 yards on defense, their 3rd game allowing over 500 yards and their 8th time (6th consecutive game) allowing over 400 yards.

=== At No. 12 Kansas State ===
Kansas Jayhawks at No. 12 Kansas State Wildcats

Quarter	1	2	3	4	Total
Jayhawks	7	14	0	6	27
No. 12 Wildcats	23	7	7	10	47

at Bill Snyder Family Football Stadium • Manhattan, Kansas

- Date: Saturday, November 26, 2022
- Game time: 7:00 pm CST
- Game weather: Rain • Temperature: 45 °F (7 °C) • Wind: N 4 miles per hour (6.4 km/h)
- Game attendance: 51,861
- Referee: Scott Campbell
- TV announcers (Fox): Tim Brando (play-by-play), Spencer Tillman (analyst)

Game information

First quarter

- 13:05 KSU Malik Knowles 5 yard run (Ty Zentner kick) 1–5 0:05, KSU 7–0
- 7:49 KU Torry Locklin 12 yard run (Owen Piepergerdes kick) 9–75 5:16, 7–7
- 5:06 KSU Will Howard 42 yard pass to Sammy Wheeler (Ty Zentner Kick) 7–75 2:43, KSU 14–7
- 4:11 KSU Holding penalty on Kansas in the end zone for a safety KSU 16–7
- 1:37 KSU Malik Knowles 4 yard Run (Ty Zentner kick) 9–61 2:28, KSU 23–7

Second quarter

- 11:56 KU Devin Neal 11 yard run (Owen Piepergerdes kick) 11–75 4:41, KSU 23–14
- 9:09 KSU Will Howard 14 yard pass to Phillip Brooks (Ty Zentner kick) 5–92 2:42, KSU 30–14
- 4:57 KU Devin Neal 3 yard run (Owen Piepergerdes kick) 7–75 4:12, KSU 30–21

Third quarter

- 6:59 KSU Deuce Vaughn 1 yard run (Ty Zentner kick) 8–38 4:15, KSU 37–21

Fourth quarter

- 13:39 KU Jalon Daniels 1 yard Run (Jason Bean pass incomplete) 16–75 8:20, KSU 37–27
- 11:00 KSU Ty Zentner 27 yard field goal 6–22 2:28, KSU 40–27
- 4:30 KSU D. J. Giddens 5 yard run (Ty Zentner kick) 8–85 4:44, KSU 47–27

Statistics	KU	KSU
First downs	20	20
Plays–yards	63–307	63–443
Rushes–yards	30–127	42–230
Passing yards	180	213
Passing: comp–att–int	21–33–0	11–21–0
Turnovers		
Time of possession	31:00	29:00

Team	Category	Player	Statistics
Kansas	Passing	Jalon Daniels	20/32 168 yards
Kansas	Rushing	Devin Neal	16 carries 59 yards 2 TDs
Kansas	Receiving	Luke Grimm	3 receptions 48 yards
Kansas State	Passing	Will Howard	11/21 213 yards 2 TDs
Kansas State	Rushing	Deuce Vaughn	25 carries 147 yards 1 TD
Kansas State	Receiving	Deuce Vaughn	2 receptions 82 yards

In the 120th edition of the Sunflower Showdown, the Jayhawks made the 80 mile trip to Manhattan. K-State and KU traded touchdowns on their first drives. However, after a short kick return, a penalty on the kickoff return, and a holding penalty in the endzone, the Jayhawks gave up a safety. K-State would score on the next drive to go up 23–7. The Jayhawks wouldn't come within a touchdown of the Wildcats the rest of the game and would lose their 14th straight game against their in-state rival.

=== vs Arkansas ===
2022 Liberty Bowl Kansas Jayhawks vs Arkansas Razorbacks

Quarter	1	2	3	4	OT	2OT	3OT	Total
Jayhawks	7	6	7	18	7	8	0	53
Razorbacks	24	7	7	0	7	8	2	55

at Simmons Bank Liberty Stadium • Memphis, Tennessee

- Date: Wednesday, December 28, 2022
- Game time: 4:30 pm CST
- Game weather: Sunny • Temperature: 61 °F (16 °C)
- Game attendance: 52,847
- Referee: Matthew Richards
- TV announcers (ESPN): Dave O'Brien, Dan Mullen

Game information

First quarter

- 11:12 ARK Cam Little 37 yard field goal 10–56 3:48, ARK 3–0
- 8:40 KU Jalon Daniels 29 yard pass to Ky Thomas (Owen Piepergerdes kick) 6–75 2:32. KU 7–3
- 6:05 ARK K. J. Jefferson 59 yard pass to Matt Landers (Cam Little kick) 2–68 0:30, ARK 10–7
- 5:57 ARK K. J. Jefferson 17 yard pass to Ty Washington (Cam Little kick) 1–17 0:08, ARK 17–7
- 0:23 ARK KJ Jefferson 3 yard run (Cam Little kick) 11–73 4:11, ARK 24–7

Second quarter

- 5:02 ARK A. J. Green 20 yard run (Cam Little kick) 8–78 3:13, ARK 31–7
- 1:18 ARK Jalon Daniels 24 yard pass to Mason Fairchild (Jalon Daniels pass to Mason Fairchild failed) 10–75 3:44, ARK 31–13

Third quarter

- 8:43 ARK Rashod Dubinion 2 yard run (Cam Little kick) 10–80 3:16, ARK 38–13
- 3:15 KU Ky Thomas 2 yard run (Owen Piepergerdes kick) 5–86 2:26, ARK 38–20

Fourth quarter

- 14:07 KU Owen Piepergerdes 36 yard field goal 8–44 2:47, ARK 38–27
- 1:05 KU Jalon Daniels 10 yard Douglas Emilien (Owen Piepergerdes kick) 7–48 1:38, 30–38
- 0:41 KU Jalon Daniels 21 yard pass to Luke Grimm (Jalon Daniels pass to Lawrence Arnold) 4–50 0:24, 38–38

First overtime

- KU Jalon Daniels 2 yard pass to Jared Casey 2 Yd pass from Jalon Daniels (Owen Piepergerdes kick) KU 45–38
- ARK Rashod Dubinion 6 yard run (Cam Little kick) 45–45

Second overtime

- ARK K. J. Jefferson 20 yard run (K. J. Jefferson pass to Jaedon Wilson) ARK 53–45
- KU Jalon Daniels 2 yard run (Jalon Daniels pass to Jared Casey) 53–53

Third overtime

- ARK K. J. Jefferson Pass to Rashod Dubinion ARK 55–53

Statistics	KU	ARK
First downs	32	29
Plays–yards	90–603	81–681
Rushes–yards	34–59	52–394
Passing yards	544	287
Passing: comp–att–int	37–56–2	19–29–1
Turnovers		
Time of possession	30:55	29:05

Team	Category	Player	Statistics
Kansas	Passing	Jalon Daniels	37/55 544 yards 5 TDs 2 INTs
Kansas	Rushing	Devin Neal	9 carries 29 yards
Kansas	Receiving	Luke Grimm	10 receptions 167 yards 1 TD
Arkansas	Passing	K. J. Jefferson	19/29 287 yards 2 TDs 1 INT
Arkansas	Rushing	K. J. Jefferson	14 carries 130 yards 2 TDs
Arkansas	Receiving	Matt Landers	3 receptions 121 yards 1 TD

In the Jayhawks first bowl game in 14 years, they scored the first touchdown of the game. That would be the Jayhawks only lead in regulation However, multiple turnovers would get the Jayhawks into a 31–7 hole late in the first half. The Jayhawks would finish regulation on a 31–7 run themselves to send the game into overtime led by a successful onside kick. The Jayhawks fell short in overtime and would lose the game 53–55. Daniels broke the school record for passing yards in a game with 544.

== Rankings ==
Ranking movements Legend: ██ Increase in ranking ██ Decrease in ranking — = Not ranked RV = Received votes
	Week															
Poll	Pre	1	2	3	4	5	6	7	8	9	10	11	12	13	14	Final
AP			—	RV	RV	19	19	RV	—		RV	—				
Coaches			—	RV	RV	17	20	RV	—		RV	—				
CFP	Not released															Not released

== Season Honors ==
1st Team All-Big 12

- DB Cobee Bryant

2nd Team All-Big 12

- QB Jalon Daniels
- TE Mason Fairchild
- OL Mike Novitsky
- DL Lonnie Phelps

Honorable Mention All-Big 12

- RB Devin Neal
- OL Earl Bostick
- DL Dominick Puni
- DB Kenny Logan
