= 2022 Oklahoma State Cowboys football team =

American college football season

2022 Oklahoma State Cowboys football

Guaranteed Rate Bowl, L 17–24 vs. Wisconsin
- Conference: Big 12 Conference
- Record: 7–6 (4–5 Big 12)
- Head coach: Mike Gundy (18th season)
- Offensive coordinator: Kasey Dunn (3rd season)
- Offensive scheme: Spread option
- Defensive coordinator: Derek Mason (1st season)
- Base defense: 3–4
- Home stadium: Boone Pickens Stadium

2022 Big 12 Conference football standings
	Conf.			Overall
Team	W		L	W		L
No. 2 TCU y^	9	–	0	13	–	2
No. 14 Kansas State y$	7	–	2	10	–	4
No. 25 Texas	6	–	3	8	–	5
Texas Tech	5	–	4	8	–	5
Oklahoma State	4	–	5	7	–	6
Baylor	4	–	5	6	–	7
Oklahoma	3	–	6	6	–	7
Kansas	3	–	6	6	–	7
West Virginia	3	–	6	5	–	7
Iowa State	1	–	8	4	–	8
Championship: Kansas State 31, TCU 28 ^{OT}
^ – College Football Playoff participant; $ – Conference champion; y – Championship game participant; Rankings from AP Poll

The 2022 Oklahoma State Cowboys football team represented Oklahoma State University as a member of the Big 12 Conference during the 2022 NCAA Division I FBS football season. Led by 18th-year head coach Mike Gundy, the Cowboys played home games at Boone Pickens Stadium in Stillwater, Oklahoma.

== Preseason ==
=== Big 12 media poll ===
The preseason poll was released on July 7, 2022.

Big 12 media poll
Predicted finish	Team	Votes (1st place)
1	Baylor (17)	365
2	Oklahoma (12)	354
3	Oklahoma State (9)	342
4	Texas (2)	289
5	Kansas State	261
6	Iowa State (1)	180
7	TCU	149
8	West Virginia	147
9	Texas Tech	119
10	Kansas	48

=== Award watch lists ===
Listed in the order that they were released

Award	Player	Position	Year	Ref
Dodd Trophy	Mike Gundy	HC	—	
Maxwell Award	Spencer Sanders	QB	R-Sr.	
Davey O'Brien Award	Spencer Sanders	QB	R-Sr.	
Doak Walker Award	Dominic Richardson	RB	Jr.	
Rimington Trophy	Preston Wilson	C	R-Jr.	
Bronko Nagurski Trophy	Brock Martin	DE	R-Sr.	
Bronko Nagurski Trophy	Collin Oliver	DE	So.	
Outland Trophy	Hunter Woodard	OG	R-Sr.	
Ray Guy Award	Tom Hutton	P	Sr.	
Paul Hornung Award	Brennan Presley	WR	Jr.	
Wuerffel Trophy	Brendon Evers	DT	R-Sr.	
Walter Camp Award	Spencer Sanders	QB	R-Sr.	
Bednarik Award	Collin Oliver	DE	So.	
Rotary Lombardi Award	Brock Martin	DE	R-Sr.	
Patrick Mannelly Award	Matt Hembrough	LS	(redshirt) Senior	

=== Preseason Big 12 awards ===
2022 Preseason All-Big 12 teams

Position	Player	Class
Offense
QB	Spencer Sanders	RS Senior
Defense
DL	Collin Oliver	Sophomore
DB	Jason Taylor II	RS Senior

== Schedule ==
Oklahoma State and the Big 12 announced the 2022 football schedule on December 1, 2021.

Date	Time	Opponent	Rank	Site	TV	Result	Attendance
September 1	6:00 p.m.	Central Michigan*	No. 12	Boone Pickens Stadium; Stillwater, OK	FS1	W 58–44	53,808
September 10	6:30 p.m.	Arizona State*	No. 11	Boone Pickens Stadium; Stillwater, OK	ESPN2	W 34–17	54,949
September 17	6:00 p.m.	Arkansas–Pine Bluff*	No. 8	Boone Pickens Stadium; Stillwater, OK	ESPN+	W 63–7	55,509
October 1	2:30 p.m.	at No. 16 Baylor	No. 9	McLane Stadium; Waco, TX	FOX	W 36–25	47,979
October 8	2:30 p.m.	Texas Tech	No. 7	Boone Pickens Stadium; Stillwater, OK	FS1	W 41–31	55,509
October 15	2:30 p.m.	at No. 13 TCU	No. 8	Amon G. Carter Stadium; Fort Worth, TX	ABC	L 40–43 ^{2OT}	49,594
October 22	2:30 p.m.	No. 20 Texas^{†}	No. 11	Boone Pickens Stadium; Stillwater, OK	ABC	W 41–34	55,509
October 29	2:30 p.m.	at No. 22 Kansas State	No. 9	Bill Snyder Family Football Stadium; Manhattan, KS	FOX	L 0–48	51,113
November 5	2:30 p.m.	at Kansas	No. 18	David Booth Kansas Memorial Stadium; Lawrence, KS	FS1	L 16–37	43,606
November 12	2:30 p.m.	Iowa State		Boone Pickens Stadium; Stillwater, OK	ESPNU	W 20–14	55,509
November 19	6:30 p.m.	at Oklahoma	No. 22	Gaylord Family Oklahoma Memorial Stadium; Norman, OK (Bedlam Series)	ABC	L 13–28	84,132
November 26	11:00 a.m.	West Virginia		Boone Pickens Stadium; Stillwater, OK	ESPN2	L 19–24	52,353
December 27	9:15 p.m.	vs. Wisconsin*		Chase Field; Phoenix, AZ (Guaranteed Rate Bowl)	ESPN	L 17–24	23,187
*Non-conference game; ^{†}Homecoming; Rankings from AP Poll (and CFP Rankings, after November 1) – Released prior to game; All times are in Central time

== Personnel ==
2022 Oklahoma State Cowboys football team roster
Players
Coaches
Offense

Pos.	#	Name	Class
RB	0	Ollie Gordon II	Fr
WR	1	Braylin Presley	Fr
WR	2	Tayln Shettron	Fr
QB	3	Spencer Sanders	Sr
RB	4	Deondre Jackson	So
RB	5	Zach Middleton	So
WR	6	Stephon Johnson Jr.	Fr
WR	8	Braydon Johnson	Sr
WR	9	Bryson Green	So
WR	10	Rashod Owens	So
TE	11	Tabry Shettron	Fr
QB	12	Gunnar Gundy	Fr
QB	13	Garret Rangel	Fr
WR	15	Rylan McQuarters	Sr
QB	16	Landon Webster	Fr
WR	17	John Paul Richardson	So
QB	18	Gavynn Parker	Fr
RB	20	Dominic Richardson	Jr
RB	22	Donte Buckner	So
RB	23	Jaden Nixon	Fr
RB	24	C. J. Brown	Fr
RB	25	Andre Washington	Jr
RB	27	Ethan Washington	Fr
TE	28	Blaine Green	So
WR	32	Clayton Barbour	Jr
WR	33	Daxton Hembree	Fr
WR	36	Vance Hooper	Sr
WR	37	Seth Swircyznski	Fr
TE	38	Jake Schultz	Jr
WR	39	Peyton Kramer	Fr
TE	42	Max Muehlberger	Fr
TE	47	Luke McEndoo	Fr
OL	51	Austin Kawecki	Fr
OL	54	Aidan Gonzalez	Fr
OL	56	Jake Henry	So
OL	58	Vilami Makahununiu	Fr
OL	61	Jake Springfield	Jr
OL	62	Matthew Wade	Fr
OL	64	Carson Shelton	Sr
OL	65	Hilton Marsh	Fr
OL	66	Joe Michalski	Jr
OL	67	Cole Birmingham	Jr
OL	68	Taylor Miterko	Jr
OL	69	Evan Bax	Fr
OL	70	Hunter Woodard	Sr
OL	71	Casey Collier	So
OL	72	Calvin Harvey	Fr
OL	73	Jason Brooks Jr.	So
OL	74	Preston Wilson	Jr
OL	75	Eli Russ	So
OL	76	Caleb Etienne	Jr
OL	77	Tyrone Webber	Jr
OL	78	Davis Dotson	Fr
OL	79	Logan Nobles	Fr
WR	80	Brennan Presley	Jr
WR	81	C. J. Tate	Sr
TE	82	Quinton Stewart	So
WR	83	Cole Cabbiness	So
WR	84	Mason Gilkey	Fr
WR	85	Jaden Bray	So
WR	86	Rashad Dixon	Jr
WR	87	Jaxon Deason	Fr
WR	88	Langston Anderson	Jr
WR	89	Harrison Dempsey	Fr
TE	90	Braden Cassity	Sr

Defense

Pos.	#	Name	Class
LB	0	Mason Cobb	Jr
LB	1	Xavier Benson	Jr
CB	2	Korie Black	Jr
CB	3	Cam Smith	Fr
LB	4	Nickolas Martin	Fr
S	5	Kendal Daniels	Fr
S	6	Lyrik Rawls	Fr
CB	7	Jabbar Muhammad	Jr
CB	8	D. J. McKinney	Fr
DE	9	Brock Martin	Sr
CB	10	Kale Smith	Fr
LB	11	Lamont Bishop	Sr
S	12	Kanion Williams	Sr
S	13	Thomas Harper	Sr
S	14	Nick Session	So
S	16	Trey Rucker	Sr
S	18	Sean Michael Flanagan	Sr
CB	20	DeSean Buckner	So
CB	22	DeMarco Jones	Jr
CB	23	Cameron Epps	Fr
CB	24	De'Kelvion Beamon	Fr
S	25	Jason Taylor II	Sr
CB	26	Jordan Reagan	So
CB	27	Raymond Gay II	Fr
S	28	Eli Williams	Fr
CB	29	Cole Stanley	So
DE	30	Collin Oliver	So
LB	31	Chance Clements	Fr
LB	32	Gabe Brown	Fr
LB	33	Donovan Stephens	Fr
DT	35	Samuela Tuihalamaka	Sr
LB	36	Na'Drian Dizadare	Jr
DE	37	Isreal Isuman-Hundley	Jr
S	38	Carter Barnard	Fr
S	39	Parker Robertson	Fr
S	40	Garrick Martin	So
LB	41	Constantino Borrelli	So
LB	45	Jeff Roberson	So
LB	46	Jacob Varnell	Fr
DE	47	Patrick Ojo	Fr
LB	48	Elijah Wright	So
S	49	Dylan Davis	Fr
LB	51	Bo Hardy	So
DE	52	Ben Kopenski	Sr
DT	54	Marcus Duckworth	So
DT	56	Xavier Ross	Jr
DE	57	Ryan Baker	So
DE	58	Gage Smith	Fr
DE	59	Martin Sheared	So
DT	67	Jaelen Tucker	Fr
DT	70	Jed Wagner	Fr
DT	71	Aden Kelley	Fr
DT	74	Preston Hickey	Fr
DE	77	Brayden Burke	Fr
DE	81	Dillon Metcalf	Fr
LB	83	Gordie Geymuller	Jr
DE	87	DeSean Brown	Fr
DE	88	Landon Dean	Fr
DE	89	Tyler Lacy	Sr
DT	90	A. J. Ridener	Fr
DE	91	Tyren Irby	Sr
DE	92	Nathan Latu	Jr
DT	93	Colin Clay	Jr
DE	94	Trace Ford	Jr
DE	95	Jaleel Johnson	Fr
DE	96	Koby Walterscheid	Jr
DT	98	Brendon Evers	Sr
DT	99	Sione Asi	Sr

Special teams

Pos.	#	Name	Class
K	19	Alex Hale	Sr
P	29	Tom Hutton	Sr
K	49	Tanner Brown	Sr
LS	53	Matt Hembrough	Sr
LS	57	Osker Ehrlich	Fr
K	59	Kasen Shrum	So
LS	63	Zeke Zaragoza	Sr
K	69	Logan Ward	Fr

Head coach

- Mike Gundy

Coordinators/assistant coaches

- Kasey Dunn – Associate head coach/offensive coordinator/wide receivers
- Derek Mason – Defensive coordinator
- Joe Bob Clements – Linebackers
- Charlie Dickey – Offensive line
- Tim Rattay – Quarterbacks
- John Wozniak – Running backs
- Tim Duffie – Cornerbacks
- Jason McEndoo – Tight ends/Cowboy Backs
- Dan Hammerschmidt – Safeties
- Greg Richmond – Defensive line
- Rob Glass – Strength and conditioning
- Tim Sanders – Offensive analyst
- Bradley Thomas – Offensive analyst
- Chris Thurmond – Offensive analyst
- Bill Clay – Defensive analyst
- Gary Gibbs – Defensive analyst
- Joseph Foteh – Special teams analyst
- Rod Johnson – Director, football operations
- Jon Pickle – Assistant director of football operations
- Todd Bradford – Director, football recruiting
- Mariah Turner – Director, on-campus recruiting
- Josh Gonzales – Assistant recruiting director, offense
- Joe Reynolds – Assistant recruiting director, defense
- Beni Tonga – Player development specialist
- Eddie Simpkins – Administrative assistant
- Zach Allen – Prospect analyst – OL
- Jordan Burton – Prospect analyst – LB
- Justin Gordon– Prospect analyst – LB
- D. J. Linton – Prospect analyst – DL
- Cameron O'Neal – Prospect analyst – RB
- Lorenzo Joe – Offensive quality control
- Zach Sallee – Offensive quality control
- J. W. Walsh – Offensive quality control
- Travis Britz – Graduate assistant
- Brayden Kearsley – Graduate assistant

Legend

- (C) Team captain
- (S) Suspended
- (I) Ineligible
- Injured
- Redshirt

Roster
Last update: 10/15/22

== Game summaries ==
=== Vs. Central Michigan ===
Central Michigan Chippewas (0–0) vs. Oklahoma State Cowboys (0–0)

Quarter	1	2	3	4	Total
Central Michigan	7	8	7	22	44
No. 12 Oklahoma State	16	28	7	7	58

at Boone Pickens Stadium • Stillwater, OK

- Date: Thursday, September 1, 2022
- Game time: 6:00 p.m. CDT
- Game weather: • Cloudy Temperature: 78
- Game attendance: 53,808
- Referee: Stuart Mullins
- TV announcers (FS1): Jason Benetti (play-by-play) & Brock Huard (analyst)

Game information

First Quarter

- (10:09) OSU – Spencer Sanders 45 yard pass to John Paul Richardson, Tanner Brown kick (Drive: 6 plays, 75 yards, 1:32; OSU 7–0)
- (7:05) CMU – Daniel Richardson 15 yard pass to Carlos Carriere, Marshall Meeder kick (Drive: 8 plays, 75 yards, 3:04; Tied 7–7)
- (0:55) OSU – Safety (OSU 9—7)
- (0:00) OSU – Spencer Sanders 17 yard rush, Tanner Brown kick (Drive:4 plays, 70 yards, 0:50; OSU 16–7)

Second Quarter

- (11:32) OSU – Spencer Sanders 13 yard pass to Braydon Johnson, Tanner Brown kick (Drive: 5 plays, 59 yards, 1:17; OSU 23–7)
- (7:14) OSU – Spencer Sanders 17 yard pass to Jaden Nixon, Tanner Brown kick (Drive: 7 plays, 57 yards, 1:55; OSU 30–7)
- (4:32) OSU – Spencer Sanders 23 yard rush, Tanner Brown kick (Drive: 5 plays, 51 yards, 1:01; OSU 37–7)
- (0:43) CMU – Lew Nichols 4 yard rush, Daniel Richardson PAT pass to Jalen McGaughy (Drive: 10 plays, 75 yards, 3:49; OSU 37–15)
- (0:11) OSU – Dominic Richardson 1 yard rush, Tanner Brown kick (Drive: 3 plays, 75 yards, 0:32; OSU 44–15)

Third Quarter

- (14:23) OSU – Spencer Sanders 7 yard pass to Bryson Green, Tanner Brown kick (Drive: 2 plays, 52 yards, 0:29; OSU 51–15)
- (11:14) CMU – Daniel Richardson 1 yard pass to Jalen McGaughy; Marshal Meeder kick (Drive: 7 plays, 80 yards, 3:03; OSU 51–22)

Fourth Quarter

- (12:31) CMU – Daniel Richardson 18 yard pass to Myles Bailey, 2 pt conversion failed (Drive: 3 plays, 39 yards, 0:32; OSU 51–28)
- (9:17) OSU – Zach Middleton 1 yard rush, Tanner Brown kick (Drive: 7 plays, 71 yards, 3:09; OSU 58–28)
- (6:50) CMU – Lew Nichols 15 yard rush, Daniel Richardson PAT Pass to Carlos Carriere (Drive: 6 plays, 70 yards, 2:27; OSU 58–36)
- (3:15) CMU – Daniel Richardson 54 yard pass to Jalen McGaughy, Daniel Richardson PAT pass to Joel Wilson (Drive: 6 plays, 72 yards, 2:04; OSU 58–44)

Statistics	CMU	OKST
First downs	31	28
Total yards	546	531
Rushes/yards	39/122	32/125
Passing yards	424	406
Passing: Comp–Att–Int	36–49–1	28–41
Time of possession	36:08	23:52

Team	Category	Player	Statistics
Central Michigan	Passing	Daniel Richardson	36/49, 424 yards, 4 TD's 1 INT
Central Michigan	Rushing	Lew Nichols III	26 carries, 72 yards, 2 TD's
Central Michigan	Receiving	Jalen McGaughy	6 receptions, 126 yards, 2 TD's
Oklahoma State	Passing	Spencer Sanders	28/41, 406 yards, 4 TD's
Oklahoma State	Rushing	Dominic Richardson	9 carries, 61 yards, 1 TD
Oklahoma State	Receiving	Braydon Johnson	6 receptions, 133 yards, 1 TD

=== Vs. Arizona State ===
Arizona State Sun Devils (1–0) vs. No. 11 Oklahoma State Cowboys (1–0)

Quarter	1	2	3	4	Total
Arizona State	3	0	7	7	17
No. 11 Oklahoma State	0	17	3	14	34

at Boone Pickens Stadium • Stillwater, OK

- Date: Saturday, September 10, 2022
- Game time: 6:30 p.m. CDT
- Game weather: •Cloudy Temperature: 83
- Game attendance: 54,949
- Referee: Steve Strimling
- TV announcers (ESPN2): Dave Flemming (play-by-play), Rod Gilmore (analyst) & Tiffany Blackmon (sideline)

Game information

First Quarter

- (9:00) ASU – Carter Brown 27 yard field goal (Drive: 8 plays, 78 yards, 3:41; ASU 3–0)

Second Quarter

- (8:28) OSU – Dominic Richardson 3 yard rush, Tanner Brown kick (Drive: 5 plays, 37 yards, 1:13; OSU 7–3)
- (2:45) OSU – Spencer Sanders 6 yard rush, Tanner Brown kick (Drive: 12 plays, 96 yards, 3:07; OSU 14–3)
- (0:26) OSU – Tanner Brown 43 yard field goal (Drive: 6 plays, 14 yards, 1:25; OSU 17–3)

Third Quarter

- (12:18) ASU – Xazavian Valladay 1 yard rush, Carter Brown kick (Drive: 4 plays, 75 yards, 2:42; OSU 17–10)
- (5:48) OSU – Tanner Brown 24 yard field goal (Drive: 8 plays, 63 yards, 1:45; OSU 20–10)

Fourth Quarter

- (14:25) ASU – Emory Jones 21 yard pass to Elijhah Brown, Carter Brown kick (Drive: 8 plays, 85 yards, 3:01; OSU 20–17)
- (13:31) OSU – Spencer Sanders 31 yard pass to Bryson Green, Tanner Brown kick (Drive: 3 plays, 65 yards, 0:53; OSU 27–17)
- (7:41) OSU – Spencer Sanders 14 yard pas to Ollie Gordon II, Tanner Brown kick (Drive: 13 plays, 80 yards, 5:19; OSU 34–17)

Statistics	ASU	OKST
First downs	14	30
Total yards	354	465
Rushes/yards	37/131	46/197
Passing yards	223	226
Passing: Comp–Att–Int	12–24	21–38–1
Time of possession	30:34	29:26

Team	Category	Player	Statistics
Arizona State	Passing	Emory Jones	12/24, 223 yards, 1 TD
Arizona State	Rushing	Xazavian Valladay	21 carries, 118 yards, 1 TD
Arizona State	Receiving	Elijhah Badger	6 receptions, 91 yards, 1 TD
Oklahoma State	Passing	Spencer Sanders	21/38, 268 yards, 2 TD's 1 INT
Oklahoma State	Rushing	Dominic Richardson	27 carries, 131 yards, 1 TD
Oklahoma State	Receiving	Bryson Green	5 receptions, 83 yards, 1 TD

=== Vs. Arkansas–Pine Bluff ===
Arkansas–Pine Bluff (2–0) vs. No. 8 Oklahoma State Cowboys (2–0)

Quarter	1	2	3	4	Total
Arkansas-Pine Bluff	0	7	0	0	7
No. 8 Oklahoma State	28	21	7	7	63

at Boone Pickens Stadium • Stillwater, OK

- Date: Saturday, September 17, 2022
- Game time: 6:00 p.m. CDT
- Game weather: • Sunny Temperature: 91
- Game attendance: 55,509
- Referee: Scott Campbell
- TV announcers (ESPN+): Pete Sousa (play-by-play) & Chad Brown (analyst)

Game information

First Quarter

- (14:22) OSU – Spencer Sanders 24 yard pass to Braydon Johnson, Tanner Brown kick (Drive: 2 plays, 75 yards, 0:38; OSU 7–0)
- (12:24) OSU – Trace Ford 15 yard punt, Tanner Brown kick (OSU 14–0)
- (1:50) OSU – Spencer Sanders 10 yard pass to John Paul Richardson, Tanner Brown kick (Drive: 10 plays, 87 yards, 2:51; OSU 21–0)
- (1:10) OSU – Spencer Sanders 42 yard pass to Braydon Johnson, Tanner Brown kick (Drive: 1 play, 42 yards, 0:08; OSU 28–0)

Second Quarter

- (14:18) OSU – Spencer Sanders 23 yard pass to Brennan Presley, Tanner Brown kick (Drive: 5 plays, 38 yards, 1:51; OSU 35–0)
- (10:50) OSU – Korie Black 37 yard FG return run, Tanner Brown kick (OSU 42–0)
- (5:24) APB – Skyler Perry 15 yard pass to Raequan Prince, Cristofer Thompson kick (Drive: 3 plays, 23 yards, 1:04; OSU 42–7)
- (1:23) OSU – Gunnar Gundy 16 yard pass to Talyn Shettron, Tanner Brown kick (Drive: 11 plays, 70 yards, 3:54; OSU 49–7)

Third Quarter

- (9:00) OSU – Gunnar Gundy 25 yard pass to Cale Cabbiness, Alex Hale kick (Drive: 7 plays, 83 yards, 2:05; OSU 56–7)

Fourth Quarter

- (13:59) OSU – Ollie Gordon II 53 yard rush, Alex Hale kick (Drive: 7 plays, 89 yards, 1:37; OSU 63–7)

Statistics	APB	OKST
First downs	13	26
Total yards	230	538
Rushes/yards	31/81	27/168
Passing yards	149	370
Passing: Comp–Att–Int	16–41	25–38–1
Time of possession	37:35	22:25

Team	Category	Player	Statistics
Arkansas-Pine Bluff	Passing	Skyler Perry	11/27, 70 yards, 1 TD
Arkansas-Pine Bluff	Rushing	Johnny Williams	5 carries, 18 yards
Arkansas-Pine Bluff	Receiving	Javaughn Williams	4 receptions, 21 yards
Oklahoma State	Passing	Gunnar Gundy	12/20, 128 yards, 2 TD's, 1 INT
Oklahoma State	Rushing	Ollie Gordon II	3 carries, 65 yards
Oklahoma State	Receiving	Braydon Johnson	4 receptions, 86 yards, 2 TD's

=== At No. 16 Baylor ===
No. 9 Oklahoma State Cowboys (3–0) vs. No. 16 Baylor Bears (3–1)

Quarter	1	2	3	4	Total
No. 9 Oklahoma State	7	9	17	3	36
No. 16 Baylor	3	0	22	0	25

at McLane Stadium • Waco, TX

- Date: Saturday, October 1, 2022
- Game time: 2:30 p.m. CDT
- Game weather: • Sunny Temperature: 84
- Game attendance: 47,979
- Referee: David Alvarez
- TV announcers (FOX): Jason Benetti (play-by-play) & Brock Huard (analyst)

Game information

First Quarter

- (10:46) BAY – John Mayers 34 yard FG (Drive: 10 plays, 59 yards, 4:14; BU 3–0)
- (5:24) OSU – Spencer Sanders 8 yard pass to Bryson Green, Tanner Brown kick (Drive: 10 plays, 55 yards, 3:17; OSU 7–3)

Second Quarter

- (13:38) OSU – Safety (Drive: 1 play, −2 yards, 0:07; OSU 9–3)
- (0:27) OSU – Spencer Sanders 1 yard rush, Tanner Brown kick (Drive: 10 plays, 55 yards, 3:17; OSU 16–7)

Third Quarter

- (14:47) OSU – Jaden Nixon 98 KO return, Tanner Brown kick (Drive: 0 plays, 0 yards, 0:13; OSU 23–7)
- (12:23) BAY – Blake Shapen 49 yard pass to Monaray Baldwin, John Mayers kick (Drive: 6 plays, 73 yards, 2:24; OSU 23–10)
- (7:58) BAY – Richard Reese 1 yard rush, John Mayers kick (Drive: 5 plays, 37 yards, 2:30; OSU 23–17)
- (7:14) OSU – Dominic Richardson 1 yard rush, Tanner Brown kick (Drive: 2 plays, 50 yards, 0:44; OSU 30–17)
- (3:38) OSU – Tanner Brown 19 yard FG (Drive: 6 plays, 32 yards, 1:48; OSU 33–17)
- (2:14) BAY – Blake Shapen 70 yard pass to Monaray Baldwin, PAT pass to Gavin Holmes (Drive: 4 plays, 75 yards, 1:24; OSU 33–25)

Fourth Quarter

- (4:48) OSU – Tanner Brown 26 yard FG (Drive: 8 plays, 24 yards, 3:57; OSU 36–25)

Statistics	OKST	BAY
First downs	23	21
Total yards	379	457
Rushes/yards	46/166	30/112
Passing yards	213	345
Passing: Comp–Att–Int	21–30–1	28–40–2
Time of possession	30:46	29:14

Team	Category	Player	Statistics
Oklahoma State	Passing	Spencer Sanders	20/29, 181 yards, 1 TD's
Oklahoma State	Rushing	Spencer Sanders	14 carries, 75 yards, 1 TD
Oklahoma State	Receiving	Brennan Presley	8 receptions, 86 yards
Baylor	Passing	Blake Shapen	28/40, 345 yards, 2 TD's, 2 INT's
Baylor	Rushing	Richard Reese	17 carries, 85 yards, 1 TD
Baylor	Receiving	Monaray Baldwin	7 receptions, 174 yards, 2 TD's

=== Vs. Texas Tech ===
Texas Tech Red Raiders (3–2) vs. No. 7 Oklahoma State Cowboys (4–0)

Quarter	1	2	3	4	Total
Texas Tech	14	10	7	0	31
No. 7 Oklahoma State	17	3	14	7	41

at Boone Pickens Stadium • Stillwater, OK

- Date: Saturday, October 8, 2022
- Game time: 2:30 p.m. CDT
- Game weather: • Sunny Temperature: 70
- Game attendance: 55,509
- Referee: Michael Vandervelde
- TV announcers (FS1): Eric Collins (play-by-play) & Devin Gardner (analyst)

Game information

First Quarter

- (12:17) TTU – Behren Morton 27 yard pass to Jerand Bradley, Trey Wolff kick (Drive: 11 plays, 75 yards, 2:43; TTU 7–0)
- (11:48) OSU – Spencer Sanders 32 yard pass to Bryson Green, Tanner Brown kick (Drive: 2 plays, 34 yards, 00:29; Tied 7–7)
- (5:03) OSU – Spencer Sanders 14 yard rush, Tanner Brown kick (Drive: 6 plays, 63 yards, 1:29; OSU 14–7)
- (2:31) OSU – Tanner Brown 42 yard FG (Drive: 7 plays, 43 yards, 1:28; OSU 17–7)
- (0:20) TTU – Behren Morton 9 yard rush, Trey Wolff kick (Drive: 10 plays, 81 yards, 2:11; OSU 17–14)

Second Quarter

- (12:33) TTU – Behren Morton 4 yard pass to Xavier White, Trey Wolff kick (Drive: 8 plays, 64 yards, 2:06; TTU 21–17)
- (7:18) OSU – Tanner Brown 22 yard FG (Drive: 16 plays, 68 yards, 5:15; TTU 21–20)
- (0:35) TTU – Trey Wolff 23 yard FG (Drive: 18 plays, 70 yards, 6:43; TTU 24–20)

Third Quarter

- (11:25) OSU – Tanner Brown 34 yard FG (Drive: 12 plays, 58 yards, 3:35; TTU 24–23)
- (8:42) TTU – SaRodorick Thompson 2 yard rush, Trey Wolff kick (Drive: 8 plays, 65 yards, 2:43; TTU 31–23)
- (3:18) OSU – Spencer Sanders 2 yard rush, PAT pass to Jaden Bray (Drive: 7 plays, 53 yards, 2:19; Tied 31–31)
- (0:03) OSU – Tanner Brown 24 yard FG (Drive: 7 plays, 12 yards, 2:12; OSU 34–31)

Fourth Quarter

- (2:27) OSU – Dominic Richardson 7 yard rush, Tanner Brown kick (Drive: 11 plays, 57 yards, 3:50; OSU 41–31)

Statistics	TTU	OKST
First downs	30	25
Total yards	527	434
Rushes/yards	41/148	41/137
Passing yards	379	279
Passing: Comp–Att–Int	39–63–1	22–45
Time of possession	32:02	27:58

Team	Category	Player	Statistics
Texas Tech	Passing	Behren Morton	39/62, 379 yards, 2 TD's, 1 INT
Texas Tech	Rushing	SaRodorick Thompson	20 carries, 87 yards, 1 TD
Texas Tech	Receiving	Trey Cleveland	9 receptions, 100 yards
Oklahoma State	Passing	Spencer Sanders	22/45, 297 yards, 1 TD
Oklahoma State	Rushing	Dominic Richardson	19 carries, 67 yards, 1 TD
Oklahoma State	Receiving	Brennan Presley	6 receptions, 62 yards

=== At No. 13 TCU ===
No. 8 Oklahoma State Cowboys (5–0) vs. No. 13 TCU Horned Frogs (5–0)

Quarter	1	2	3	4	OT	2OT	Total
No. 8 Oklahoma State	14	10	6	0	7	3	40
No. 13 TCU	7	6	3	14	7	6	43

at Amon G. Carter Stadium • Fort Worth, TX

- Date: Saturday, October 15, 2022
- Game time: 2:30 p.m. CDT
- Game weather: Sunny • Temperature: 91 °F (33 °C) • Wind: S at 12 miles per hour (19 km/h)
- Game attendance: 49,594
- Referee: Kevin Boitmann
- TV announcers (ABC): Sean McDonough (play-by-play), Todd Blackledge (analyst) & Molly McGrath (sideline)

Game information

First Quarter

- (10:25) OSU – Spencer Sanders 29 yard rush, Tanner Brown kick (Drive: 6 plays, 73 yards, 2:32; OSU 7–0)
- (4:33) OSU – Spencer Sanders 8 yard rush, Tanner Brown kick (Drive: 9 plays, 78 yards, 3:42; OSU 14–0)
- (1:40) TCU – Max Duggan 1 yard rush, Griffin Kell kick (Drive: 7 plays, 75 yards, 2:53; OSU 14–7)

Second Quarter

- (13:32) OSU – Tanner Brown 35 yard FG (Drive: 4 plays, 7 yards, 1:28; OSU 17–7)
- (10:04) OSU – Spencer Sanders 22 yard pass to John Paul Richardson, Tanner Brown kick (Drive: 8 plays, 47 yards, 2:52; OSU 24–7)
- (3:38) TCU – Griffin Kell 47 yard FG (Drive: 4 plays, 1 yard, 1:29; OSU 24–10)
- (0:02) TCU – Griffin Kell 35 yard FG (Drive: 8 plays, 44 yards, 2:08; OSU 24–13)

Third Quarter

- (11:38) OSU – Tanner Brown 34 yard FG (Drive: 8 plays, 58 yards, 3:22; OSU 27–13)
- (5:51) TCU – Griffin Kell 34 yard FG (Drive: 12 plays, 54 yards, 5:41; OSU 27–16)
- (1:25) OSU – Tanner Brown 32 yard FG (Drive: 11 plays,60 yards, 4:26; OSU 30–16)

Fourth Quarter

- (9:22) TCU – Kendre Miller 3 yard rush, Griffin Kell kick (Drive: 5 plays, 47 yards, 2:06; OSU 30–23)
- (1:57) TCU – Max Duggan 10 yard pass to Jared Wiley, Griffin Kell kick (Drive: 8 plays, 94 yards, 3:20; Tied 30–30)

Overtime

- (0:00) TCU – Max Duggan 25 yard pass to Quentin Johnston, Griffin Kell kick (Drive: 2 plays, 25 yards, 0:00; TCU 37–30)
- (0:00) OSU – Dominic Richardson 1 yard rush, Tanner Brown kick (Drive: 5 plays, 25 yards, 0:00; Tied 37–37)

Second Overtime

- (0:00) OSU – Tanner Brown 52 yard FG (Drive: 4 plays, −10 yards, 0:00; OSU 40–37)
- (0:00) TCU – Kendre Miller 2 yard rush (Drive: 6 plays, 25 yards, 0:00; TCU 43–40)

Statistics	OKST	TCU
First downs	19	27
Total yards	386	510
Rushes/yards	41/141	43/224
Passing yards	245	286
Passing: Comp–Att–Int	16–36–1	23–40
Time of possession	26:55	33:05

Team	Category	Player	Statistics
Oklahoma State	Passing	Spencer Sanders	16/36, 245 yards, 1 TD, 1 INT
Oklahoma State	Rushing	Dominic Richardson	22 carries, 72 yards, 1 TD
Oklahoma State	Receiving	John Paul Richardson	5 receptions, 51 yards, 1 TD
TCU	Passing	Max Duggan	23/40, 286 yards, 2 TD
TCU	Rushing	Kendre Miller	22 carries, 104 yards, 2 TD
TCU	Receiving	Quentin Johnston	8 receptions, 180 yards, 1 TD

=== Vs. No. 20 Texas ===
No. 20 Texas Longhorns (5–2) vs. No. 11 Oklahoma State Cowboys (5–1)

Quarter	1	2	3	4	Total
No. 20 Texas	14	17	3	0	34
No. 11 Oklahoma State	10	14	3	14	41

at Boone Pickens Stadium • Stillwater, OK

- Date: Saturday, October 22, 2022
- Game time: 2:30 p.m. CDT
- Game weather: Sunny • Temperature: 86 °F (30 °C) • Wind: S 23 miles per hour (37 km/h)
- Game attendance: 55,509
- Referee: Kevin Mar
- TV announcers (ABC): Dave Pasch (play-by-play), Dusty Dvoracek (analyst) & Tom Luginbill (sideline)

Game information

First Quarter

- (13:21) OSU – Tanner Brown 48 yard FG (Drive: 4 plays, −2 yards, 0:51; OSU 3–0)
- (12:01) TEX – Bijan Robinson 42 yard run, Bert Auburn kick (Drive: 4 plays, 71 yards, 1:20; TEX 7–3)
- (9:39) OSU – Dominic Richardson 4 yard run, Tanner Brown kick (Drive: 6 plays, 75 yards, 2:22; OSU 10–7)
- (4:21) TEX – Quinn Ewers 12 yard pass to Xavier Worthy, Bert Auburn kick (Drive: 4 plays, 51 yards, 1:51; TEX 14–10)

Second Quarter

- (13:28) TEX – Quinn Ewers 41 yard pass to Bijan Robinson, Bert Auburn kick (Drive: 2 plays, 42 yards, 0:38; TEX 21–10)
- (11:16) OSU – Dominic Richardson 1 yard run, Tanner Brown kick (Drive: 8 plays, 75 yards, 2:12; TEX 21–17)
- (8:04) TEX – Bert Auburn 37 yard FG (Drive: 7 plays, 40 yards, 3:12; TEX 24–17)
- (3:43) TEX – Roschon Johnson 52 yard run, Tanner Brown kick (Drive: 7 plays, 80 yards, 1:32; TEX 31–17)
- (2:41) OSU – Dominic Richardson 2 yard run, Tanner Brown kick (Drive: 3 plays, 85 yards, 1:02; TEX 31–24)

Third Quarter

- (2:10) TEX – Bert Auburn 33 yard FG (Drive: 4 plays, 5 yards, 1:07; TEX 34–24)
- (0:29) OSU – Tanner Brown 40 yard FG (Drive: 7 plays, 52 yards, 1:41; TEX 34–27)

Fourth Quarter

- (9:54) OSU – Spencer Sanders 10 yard pass to Brennan Presley, Tanner Brown kick (Drive: 12 plays, 66 yards, 4:53; Tied 34–34)
- (3:09) OSU – Spencer Sanders 41 yard pass yard pass to Bryson Green, Tanner Brown kick (Drive: 6 plays, 72 yards, 1:48; OSU 41–34)

Statistics	TEX	OKST
First downs	21	32
Total yards	523	535
Rushes/yards	32/204	40/142
Passing yards	319	393
Passing: Comp–Att–Int	19–49–3	35–58–1
Time of possession	27:00	33:00

Team	Category	Player	Statistics
Texas	Passing	Quinn Ewers	19/49, 319 yards, 2 TD, 3 INT
Texas	Rushing	Bijan Robinson	24 carries, 140 yards, 1 TD
Texas	Receiving	Xavier Worthy	4 receptions, 78 yards, 1 TD
Oklahoma State	Passing	Spencer Sanders	34/57, 391 yards, 2 TD, 1 INT
Oklahoma State	Rushing	Jaden Nixon	8 carries, 64 yards
Oklahoma State	Receiving	Bryson Green	5 receptions, 133 yards, 1 TD

=== At No. 22 Kansas State ===
No. 9 Oklahoma State Cowboys (6–1) vs. No. 22 Kansas State Wildcats (5–2)

Quarter	1	2	3	4	Total
No. 9 Oklahoma State	0	0	0	0	0
No. 22 Kansas State	14	21	3	10	48

at Bill Snyder Family Stadium • Manhattan, KS

- Date: Saturday, October 29, 2022
- Game time: 2:30 p.m.CST
- Game weather: • Sunny Temperature: 65
- Game attendance: 51,113
- Referee: Scott Campbell
- TV announcers (FOX): Jason Benetti (play-by-play), Brock Huard (analyst) & Allison Williams (sideline)

Game information

First Quarter

- (11:02) KSU – Will Howard 38 yard pass to Kade Warner, Ty Zentner kick (Drive: 9 plays, 77 yards, 3:58; KSU 7–0)
- (8:15) KSU – Deuce Vaughn 62 yard rush, Ty Zentner Kick (Drive: 2 plays, 62 yards, 0:16; KSU 14–0)

Second Quarter

- (11:17) KSU – Will Howard 31 yard pass to Philip Brooks, Ty Zentner kick (Drive: 7 plays, 83 yards, 3:32; KSU 21–0)
- (9:06) KSU – Will Howard 41 yard pass to Kade Warner, Ty Zentner kick (Drive: 3 plus, 43 yards, 1:24; KSU 28–0)
- (0:07) KSU – Will Howard 1 yard pass to Deuce Vaughn, Ty Zentner kick (Drive: 14 plays, 77 yards, 6:35; KSU 35–0)

Third Quarter

- (4:51) KSU – Ty Zentner 23 yard FG (Drive: 10 plays, 55 yards, 4:22; KSU 38–0)

Fourth Quarter

- (13:17) KSU – Ty Zentner 29 yard FG (Drive: 10 plays, 46 yards, 3:56; KSU 41–0)
- (5:43) KSU – DJ Giddens 9 yard rush, Ty Zentner kick (Drive: 4 plays, 19 yards, 2:33; KSU 48–0)

Statistics	OKST	KSU
First downs	14	21
Total yards	217	495
Rushes/yards	30/54	37/199
Passing yards	163	296
Passing: Comp–Att–Int	15–33–2	21–37
Time of possession	24:31	35:29

Team	Category	Player	Statistics
Oklahoma State	Passing	Spencer Sanders	13/26, 147 yards, 1 INT
Oklahoma State	Rushing	Gunnar Gundy	5 carries 27 yards
Oklahoma State	Receiving	Bryson Green	3 receptions, 38 yards
Kansas State	Passing	Will Howard	21/37, 296 yards, 4 TD
Kansas State	Rushing	Deuce Vaughn	22 carries, 158 yards, 1 TD
Kansas State	Receiving	Malik Knowles	8 receptions, 113 yards

=== At Kansas ===
No. 18 Oklahoma State Cowboys (6–2) vs. Kansas Jayhawks (5–3)

Quarter	1	2	3	4	Total
No. 18 Oklahoma State	0	7	3	6	16
Kansas	10	14	7	6	37

at David Booth Kansas Memorial Stadium • Lawrence, KS

- Date: Saturday, November 5, 2022
- Game time: 2:30 p.m. CDT
- Game weather: •Sunny Temperature: 56 °F (13 °C)
- Game attendance: 43,606
- Referee: David Alvarez
- TV announcers (FS1): Tim Brando (play-by-play), Spencer Tillman (analyst)

Game information

First Quarter

- (11:21) KAN – Devin Neal 31 yard rush, Jacob Borcila kick (Drive: 4 plays, 73 yards, 1:32; KU 7–0)
- (0:09) KAN – Jacob Borcila 21 yard FG (Drive: 16 plays, 76 yards, 6:09; KU 10–0)

Second Quarter

- (9:10) OSU – Garrett Rangel 8 yard pass to Stephon Johnson Jr., Tanner Brown kick (Drive: 15 plays, 75 yards, 0:49; KU 17–7)
- (0:22) KAN – Jason Bean 73 yard rush, Jacob Borcila kick (Drive: 2 plays, 75 yards, 0:49; KU 24–7)

Third Quarter

- (7:08) KAN – Jason Bean 2 yard pass to Jared Casey, Jacob Borcila kick (Drive: 15 plays, 75 yards, 7:52; KU 31–7)
- (3:27) OSU – Tanner Brown 35 yard FG (Drive: 11 plays, 54 yards, 3:41; KU 31–10)

Fourth Quarter

- (12:52) KAN – Jacob Borcila 20 yard FG (Drive: 10 plays, 72 yards, 5:35; KU 34–10)
- (9:21) OSU – Garrett Rangel 35 yard pass to Jaden Nixon (Drive: 10 plays, 75 yards, 3:31; KU 34–16)
- (5:00) KAN – Jacob Borcila 31 yard FG (Drive: 7 plays, 64 yards, 4:16; KU 37–16)

Statistics	OKST	KAN
First downs	25	23
Total yards	415	554
Rushes/yards	35/111	46/351
Passing yards	304	203
Passing: Comp–Att–Int	27–40–3	18–23
Time of possession	24:51	35:09

Team	Category	Player	Statistics
Oklahoma State	Passing	Garret Rangel	27/40,, 304 yards, 2 TD's 3 INT's
Oklahoma State	Rushing	Dominic Richardson	14 carries, 51 yards
Oklahoma State	Receiving	Bryson Green	9 receptions, 105 yards
Kansas	Passing	Jason Bean	18/23, 203 yards, 2 TD
Kansas	Rushing	Devin Neal	32 carries, 224 yards, 1 TD
Kansas	Receiving	Luke Grimm	7 receptions, 65 yards

=== Vs. Iowa State ===
Iowa State Cyclones (4–5) vs. Oklahoma State Cowboys (6–3)

Quarter	1	2	3	4	Total
Iowa State	0	7	7	0	14
Oklahoma State	0	10	0	10	20

at Boone Pickens Stadium • Stillwater, OK

- Date: Saturday, November 12, 2022
- Game time: 2:30 p.m. CST
- Game weather: •Sunny Temperature: 45
- Game attendance: 55,509
- Referee: Derek Anderson
- TV announcers (ESPNU): Beth Mowins (play-by-play), Kirk Morrison (analyst), Stormy Buonantony (sideline)

Game information

First Quarter

- No Score

Second Quarter

- (12:10) OSU – Tanner Brown 37 yard FG (Drive: 4 plays, 8 yards, 1:57; OSU 3–0)
- (7:20) ISU – Hunter Dekkers 4 yard pass to Sean Shawn, Jace Gilbert kick (Drive: 3 plays, 9 yards, 1:03; ISU 7–3)
- (6:23) OSU – Gunnar Gundy 83 yard pass to John Paul Richardson, Tanner Brown kick (Drive: 2 plays, 81 yards, 00:44; OSU 10–7)

Third Quarter

- (12:39) ISU – Jirehl Brock 1 yard rush, Drake Nettles kick (Drive: 6 plays, 75 yards, 2:21; ISU 14–10)

Fourth Quarter

- (9:18) OSU – Spencer Sanders 14 yard pass to Jaden Nixon, Tanner Brown kick (Drive: 8 plays, 63 yards, 2:24; OSU 17–14)
- (4:19) OSU – Tanner Brown 40 yard FG (Drive: 4 plays, 1 yard, 0:47; OSU 20–14)

Statistics	ISU	OKST
First downs	19	11
Total yards	333	244
Rushes/yards	36/59	35/57
Passing yards	274	187
Passing: Comp–Att–Int	28–43–3	14–25–2
Time of possession	33:39	26:21

Team	Category	Player	Statistics
Iowa State	Passing	Hunter Dekkers	28/42, 274 yards, 1 TD, 3 INT's
Iowa State	Rushing	Cartevious Norton	17 carries, 49 yards
Iowa State	Receiving	Xavier Hutchinson	10 receptions, 106 yards
Oklahoma State	Passing	Spencer Sanders	9/13, 84 yards, 1 TD
Oklahoma State	Rushing	Dominic Richardson	14 carries, 41 yards
Oklahoma State	Receiving	John Paul Richardson	3 reception, 90 yards, 1 TD

=== At Oklahoma ===
No. 22 Oklahoma State Cowboys (7–3) vs. Oklahoma Sooners (5–5)

Quarter	1	2	3	4	Total
No. 22 Oklahoma State	0	3	7	3	13
Oklahoma	28	0	0	0	28

at Gaylord Family Oklahoma Memorial Stadium • Norman, OK

- Date: Saturday, November 19, 2022
- Game time: 6:30 p.m.CST
- Game weather: • Temperature:
- Game attendance: 84,132
- Referee: Michael Vandervelde
- TV announcers (ABC): Dave Pasch (play-by-play), Dusty Dvoracek (analyst), Tom Luginbill (sideline)

Game information

First Quarter

- (13:43) OKLA – Dillon Gabriel 2 yard rush, Zach Schmit Kick (Drive: 6 plays, 75 yards, 1:17; OU 7–0)
- (9:44) OKLA – Dillon Gabriel 30 yard pass to Jalil Farooq, Zach Schmit kick (Drive: 9 plays, 93 yards, 2:45; OU 14–0)
- (7:57) OKLA – Eric Gray 2 yard rush, Zach Schmit kick (Drive: 2 plays, 4 yards, 0:18; OU 21–0)
- (1:09) OKLA – Dillon Gabriel 23 yard pass to Drake Stoops, Zach Schmit kick (Drive: 5 plays, 75 yards, 1:31; OU 28–0)

Second Quarter

- (4:05) OSU – Tanner Brown 24 yard FG (Drive: 10 plays, 48 yards, 4:34; OU 28–3)

Third Quarter

- (1:03) OSU – Spencer Sanders 2 yard pass to Quinton Stewart, Tanner Brown kick (Drive: 7 plays, 61 yards, 2:17; OU 28–10)

Fourth Quarter

- (12:38) OSU – Tanner Brown 25 yard FG (Drive: 6 plays, 59 yards, 2:15; OU 28–13)

Statistics	OKST	OKLA
First downs	26	17
Total yards	484	434
Rushes/yards	35/103	34/175
Passing yards	381	259
Passing: Comp–Att–Int	36–67–4	20–40–1
Time of possession	37:38	22:22

Team	Category	Player	Statistics
Oklahoma State	Passing	Spencer Sanders	36/67, 381 yards, 1 TD, 4 INT's
Oklahoma State	Rushing	Spencer Sanders	17 carries, 42 yards
Oklahoma State	Receiving	Brennan Presley	9 receptions, 118 yards
Oklahoma	Passing	Dillon Gabriel	0/40, 259 yards, 2 TD's 1 INT
Oklahoma	Rushing	Eric Gray	20 carries, 90 yards, 1 TD
Oklahoma	Receiving	Drake Stoops	6 receptions, 89 yards, 1 TD

=== Vs. West Virginia ===
West Virginia Mountaineers (4–7) vs. Oklahoma State Cowboys (7–4)

Quarter	1	2	3	4	Total
West Virginia	7	14	0	3	24
Oklahoma State	0	10	9	0	19

at Boone Pickens Stadium • Stillwater, OK

- Date: Saturday, November 26, 2022
- Game time: 11:00 a.m. CST
- Game weather: • Rain Temperature: 47
- Game attendance: 52,353
- Referee: Tuta Salaam
- TV announcers (ESPN2): Jay Alter (play-by-play), Charles Arbuckle (analyst)

Game information

First Quarter

- (7:11) WVU – Garrett Greene 36 yard rush, Casey Legg kick (Drive: 1 play, 36 yards, 0:08; WVU 7–0)

Second Quarter

- (14:56) OSU – Brennan Presley 4 yard rush, Tanner Brown kick (Drive: 5 plays, 46 yards, 1:38; Tied 7–7)
- (0:14) OSU – Tanner Brown 22 yard FG (Drive: 12 plays, 73 yards, 2:04; OSU 10–7)

Third Quarter

- (12:45) WVU – Jaylen Anderson 54 yard rush, Casey Legg kick (Drive: 6 plays, 80 yards, 2:11; WVU 14–10)
- (9:53) WVU – Jaylen Anderson 57 yard rush, Casey Legg kick (Drive: 2 plays, 72 yards, 0:33; WVU 21–10)
- (5:59) OSU – Tanner Brown 38 yard FG (Drive: 10 plays, 42 yards, 3:47; WVU 21–13)
- (0:24) OSU – Ollie Gordon II 23 yard rush (Drive: 5 plays, 49 yards, 1:52; WVU 21–19)

Fourth Quarter

- (5:59) WVU – Casey Legg 34 yard FG (Drive: 9 plays, 44 yards, 5:19; WVU 24–19)

Statistics	WVU	OKST
First downs	15	20
Total yards	327	358
Rushes/yards	41/250	32/180
Passing yards	77	178
Passing: Comp–Att–Int	10–23–1	18–42
Time of possession	28:43	31:17

Team	Category	Player	Statistics
West Virginia	Passing	Garrett Greene	8/14, 48 yards, 1 INT
West Virginia	Rushing	Jaylen Anderson	15 carries, 155 yards, 2 TD
West Virginia	Receiving	Bryce Ford-Wheaton	2 receptions, 22 yards
Oklahoma State	Passing	Garrett Rangel	18/42, 178 yards
Oklahoma State	Rushing	Ollie Gordon II	17 carries, 136 yards, 1 TD
Oklahoma State	Receiving	Brennan Presley	5 receptions, 77 yards

=== Vs. Wisconsin (2022 Guaranteed Rate Bowl) ===
Wisconsin Badgers (6–6) vs. Oklahoma State Cowboys (7–5)

Quarter	1	2	3	4	Total
Wisconsin	3	14	7	0	24
Oklahoma State	7	0	0	10	17

at Chase Field • Phoenix, AZ

- Date: Tuesday December 27, 2022
- Game time: 9:15 p.m. CST
- Game weather: Indoors
- Game attendance: 23,187
- Referee: Matt Loeffler
- TV announcers (ESPN): Beth Mowins (play-by-play), Kirk Morrison (analyst), and Stormy Buonantony (sideline)

Game information

First Quarter

- (10:19) WIS – Nate Van Zelst 47 yard FG (Drive: 7 plays, 42 yards, 3:20; Wis 3–0)
- (5:56) OSU – Garret Rangel 84 yard pass to Stephon Johnson Jr., Tanner Brown kick (Drive: 1 play, 84 yards, 0:17; OSU 7–3)

Second Quarter

- (5:23) WIS – Chez Mellusi 1 yard rush, Nate Van Zelst kick (Drive: 13 plays, 68 yards, 7:24; Wis 10–7)
- (0:44) WIS – Chase Wolf 20 yard pass to Hayden Rucci, Nate Van Zelst kick (Drive: 8 plays, 65 yards, 4:16; Wis 17–7)

Third Quarter

- (6:42) WIS – Braylon Allen 20 yard rush, Nate Van Zelst kick (Drive: 2 plays, 32 yards, 0:44; WIS 24–7)

Fourth Quarter

- (12:57) OSU – Garrett Rangel 1 yard pass to Ollie Gordon II, Tanner Brown kick (Drive: 10 plays, 80 yards, 3:56; WIS 24–14)
- (5:08) OSU – Tanner Brown 24 yard FG (Drive: 13 plays, 69 yards, 6:06; WIS 24–17)

Statistics	WIS	OKST
First downs	21	11
Total yards	374	281
Rushes/yards	47/258	26/52
Passing yards	116	229
Passing: Comp–Att–Int	16–26–1	14–31–2
Time of possession	37:58	22:02

Team	Category	Player	Statistics
Wisconsin	Passing	Chase Wolf	16/26, 116 yards, 1 TD, 1 INT
Wisconsin	Rushing	Braelon Allen	22 carries, 116 yards, 1 TD
Wisconsin	Receiving	Chimere Dike	3 receptions, 36 yards
Oklahoma State	Passing	Garrett Rangel	14/31, 229 yards, 2 TD's, 2 INT's
Oklahoma State	Rushing	Ollie Gordon II	12 carries, 45 yards
Oklahoma State	Receiving	Stephon Johnson Jr.	1 reception, 84 yards, 1 TD

== Rankings ==
Ranking movements Legend: ██ Increase in ranking ██ Decrease in ranking — = Not ranked RV = Received votes
	Week															
Poll	Pre	1	2	3	4	5	6	7	8	9	10	11	12	13	14	Final
AP	12	11	8	9	9	7	8	11	9	18	RV	24	RV	—	—	—
Coaches	11	10	7	8	7	7	7	11	9	18	RV	24	—	—	—	—
CFP	Not released									18	—	22	—	—	—	Not released
