= Brennan Presley =

American football player (born 2002)

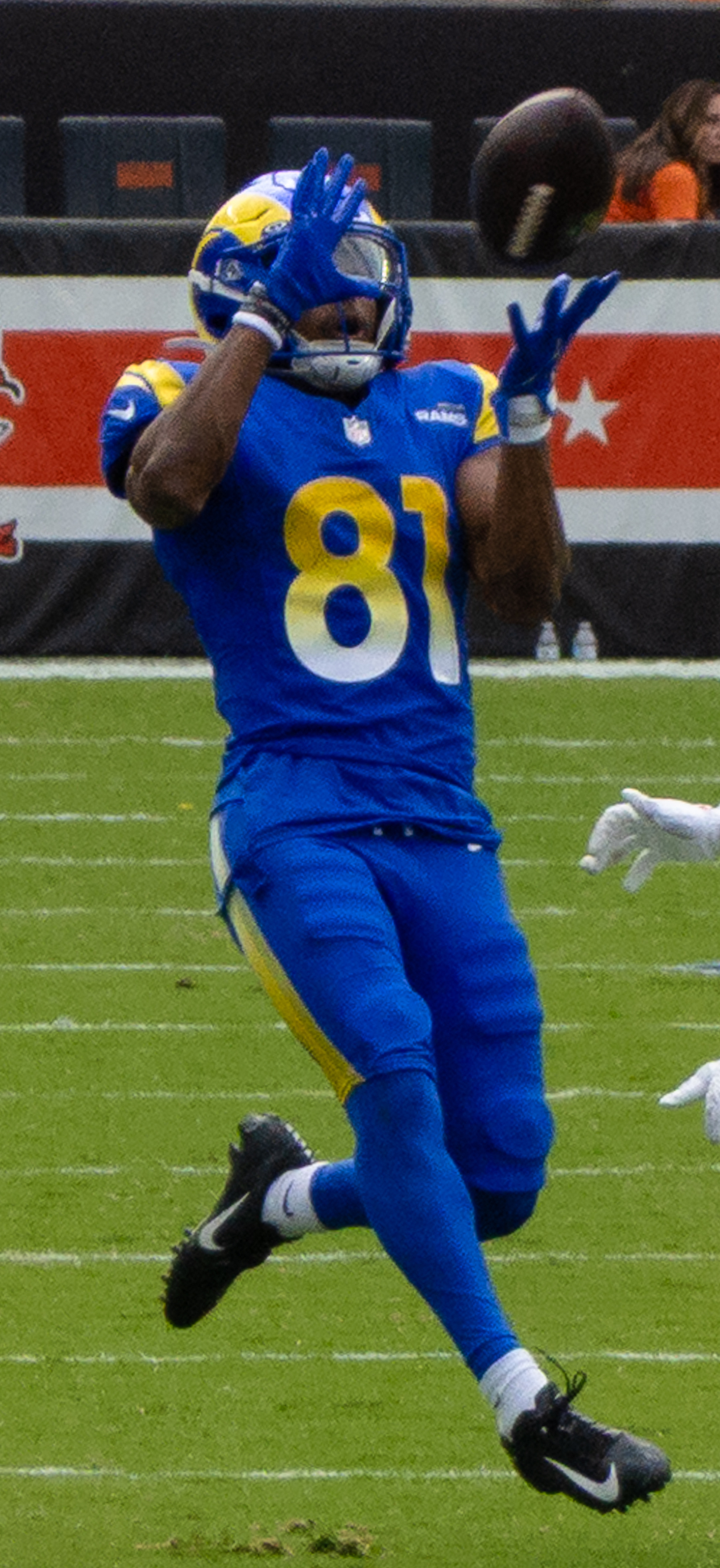
- Presley with the Los Angeles Rams in 2025

No. 81 – Los Angeles Rams
- Position: Wide receiver
- Roster status: Practice squad

Personal information
- Born: February 2, 2002 (age 24); Tulsa, Oklahoma, U.S.
- Listed height: 5 ft 8 in (1.73 m)
- Listed weight: 174 lb (79 kg)

Career information
- High school: Bixby (Bixby, Oklahoma)
- College: Oklahoma State (2020–2024)
- NFL draft: 2025: undrafted

Career history
- Los Angeles Rams (2025–present)

Awards and highlights
- 2× All-Big 12 (2021, 2023)

Career NFL statistics as of 2025
- Games played: 1
- Stats at Pro Football Reference

Brennan Orlando Presley (born February 2, 2002) is an American professional football wide receiver for the Los Angeles Rams of the National Football League (NFL). He played college football for the Oklahoma State Cowboys.

== Early life ==
Presley grew up in Tulsa, Oklahoma and attended Bixby High School. In his high school career, he hauled in 232 receptions for 3,448 yards and 40 touchdowns and rushed for 495 yards and six touchdowns. Presley also played cornerback, racking up 96 tackles with one being for a loss, a sack, 13 pass deflections, 16 interceptions, a forced fumble, and a fumble recovery. As a senior, he was named the Oklahoma Gatorade Player of the Year after hauling in 82 passes and 1,398 receiving yards and 23 touchdowns, while also totaling seven interceptions along with two pick sixes. Presley committed to play college football for the Oklahoma State Cowboys.

== College career ==
=== Oklahoma State ===
Presley made his college debut in 2020 versus Kansas State, where he rushed for nine yards and his first career touchdown in a 20–18 win. In the Cowboys' bowl game, he caught six passes for 118 yards and three touchdowns in their 37–34 win over Miami. Presley finished the 2020 season with seven receptions for 125 yards and three touchdowns along with 15 rushing yards and a touchdown. In week 4 of the 2021 season, he made two catches for 53 yards and a touchdown in a 31–20 win over Kansas State. In week 8, Presley brought in six receptions for 84 yards and two touchdowns in a 24–21 defeat to Iowa State. In week 13, he returned a kickoff for a 100-yard touchdown in a win over rival Oklahoma, and was named the Big 12 Conference Special Teams Player of the Week. In the team's bowl game, Presley hauled in ten receptions for 137 yards in a 37–35 win over Notre Dame. He finished the 2021 season with 50 receptions for 619 yards and five touchdowns, along with 36 rushing yards and a touchdown. Presley also returned 12 kicks for 392 yards and a touchdown, earning second-team All-Big-12 honors as a kick returner.

In week 5 of the 2022 season, Presley racked up eight receptions for 86 yards in a 36–25 win over Baylor. In week 8, he brought in six passes for 60 yards and a touchdown in the Cowboys' 41–34 win over Texas. In a week 12 loss to Oklahoma, Presley hauled in nine passes for 118 yards. He racked up five receptions for 77 yards and a rushing touchdown in the season finale, a 24–19 loss to West Virginia. In the 2022 Guaranteed Rate Bowl, Presley made six catches for 74 yards in a loss to Wisconsin 24–17. He finished the season with 67 receptions for 813 yards and two touchdowns, while also rushing for 12 yards and a touchdown. Presley was named preseason first-team All-Big-12 ahead of the 2023 season.

=== Statistics ===
College statistics
Year	Team	Games		Receiving				Rushing				Kick returns				Punt returns			
Year	Team	GP	GS	Rec	Yds	Avg	TD	Att	Yds	Avg	TD	Ret	Yds	Avg	TD	Ret	Yds	Avg	TD
2020	Oklahoma State	10	1	7	125	17.9	3	2	15	7.5	1	7	149	21.3	0	4	18	4.5	0
2021	Oklahoma State	14	11	50	619	12.4	5	5	36	7.2	1	12	392	32.7	1	16	66	4.1	0
2022	Oklahoma State	13	8	67	813	12.1	2	5	12	2.4	1	11	267	24.3	0	14	111	7.9	0
2023	Oklahoma State	14	12	101	991	9.8	6	11	41	3.7	2	20	411	20.6	0	11	42	3.8	0
2024	Oklahoma State	12	11	90	767	8.5	7	7	56	8.0	1	11	208	18.9	0	6	3	0.5	0
Career		63	43	315	3,315	10.5	23	30	160	5.3	6	61	1,427	23.4	1	51	240	4.7	0

== Professional career ==
Pre-draft measurables
Height	Weight	Arm length	Hand span	Wingspan	40-yard dash	10-yard split	20-yard split	20-yard shuttle	Three-cone drill	Vertical jump	Broad jump
5 ft 8 1/8 in (1.73 m)	176 lb (80 kg)	29 1/4 in (0.74 m)	9 1/2 in (0.24 m)	6 ft 0 1/2 in (1.84 m)	4.53 s	1.64 s	2.59 s	4.07 s	6.71 s	34.0 in (0.86 m)	9 ft 11 in (3.02 m)
All values from Pro Day

Presley signed with the Los Angeles Rams as an undrafted free agent on April 28, 2025. He was waived on August 26 as part of final roster cuts and re-signed to the practice squad the next day. On January 27, 2026, Presley signed a reserve/futures contract with Los Angeles.

On August 30, 2026, Presley was waived by the Rams as a part of final roster cuts; he was re-signed to the team's practice squad the following day. On November 13, Presley was signed to the active roster and waived three days later. He re-signed to the practice squad on November 17.
