= Garret Rangel =

American football quarterback

No. 13 – UT Rio Grande Valley Vaqueros
- Position: Quarterback
- Class: Redshirt Senior

Personal information
- Born: Irving, Texas, U.S.
- Listed height: 6 ft 2 in (1.88 m)
- Listed weight: 198 lb (90 kg)

Career information
- High school: Lone Star (Frisco, Texas)
- College: Oklahoma State (2022–2024); Virginia Tech (2025); UT Rio Grande Valley (2026–present)
- Stats at ESPN

Garret Rangel is an American college football quarterback for the UT Rio Grande Valley Vaqueros. He previously played for the Oklahoma State Cowboys and Virginia Tech Hokies.

== Early life ==
Rangel grew up in Frisco, Texas and attended Lone Star High School. During high school, he completed 594 out of 862 passing attempts for 9,333 yards and 101 touchdowns. He was rated a three-star recruit and committed to play college football at Oklahoma State over offers from other schools such as Utah, Virginia Tech, Vanderbilt, Northwestern and Houston.

== College career ==
=== Oklahoma State ===
During Rangel's true freshman season in 2022, he played in four games and started in three while maintaining a redshirt. He made his first career start against Kansas where he completed 27 out of 40 passing attempts for 304 yards and two touchdowns. He finished the season with completing 59 out of 115 passing attempts with 711 passing yards, four touchdowns and five interceptions.

During the 2023 season, Rangel started the season opener before losing the starting quarterback competition to Alan Bowman. He played in five games and started the season-opener against Central Arkansas. He finished the season with completing 17 out of 32 passing attempts with 172 yards, two touchdowns and an interception.

During the 2024 season, Rangel played in four games and started only one against BYU. He finished the season with completing 17 out of 33 passing attempts for 192 yards, two touchdowns and an interception.

On April 23, 2025, Rangel entered the transfer portal.

=== Virginia Tech ===
On May 7, 2025, Rangel committed to Virginia Tech.

On December 18, 2025, Rangel announced that he would enter the transfer portal for the second time.

=== UT Rio Grande Valley ===
On January 19, 2026, Rangel announced that he would transfer to UT Rio Grande Valley.

=== Statistics ===
Year	Team	Games			Passing								Rushing			
Year	Team	GP	GS	Record	Cmp	Att	Pct	Yds	Avg	TD	INT	Rtg	Att	Yds	Avg	TD
2022	Oklahoma State	4	3	0–3	59	115	51.3	711	6.2	4	5	106.0	26	–5	–0.2	0
2023	Oklahoma State	5	1	1–0	17	32	53.1	172	5.4	2	1	112.7	6	21	3.5	0
2024	Oklahoma State	4	1	0–1	17	33	51.5	192	5.8	2	1	114.3	9	91	10.1	0
2025	Virginia Tech	0	0	—	DNP											
2026	UT Rio Grande Valley	0	0	0—0	0	0	0.0	0	0.0	0	0	0.0	0	0	0.0	0
Career		13	5	1–4	93	180	51.7	1,075	6.0	8	7	108.7	41	107	2.6	0
