= Craig Young (American football) =

American football linebacker (born 2001)

No. 15 – Hamilton Tiger-Cats
- Position: Linebacker
- Roster status: Active
- CFL status: American

Personal information
- Born: March 13, 2001 (age 25); Fort Wayne, Indiana, U.S.
- Listed height: 6 ft 3 in (1.91 m)
- Listed weight: 225 lb (102 kg)

Career information
- High school: Wayne (Fort Wayne)
- College: Ohio State (2019–2021); Kansas (2022–2023)
- NFL draft: 2024: undrafted

Career history
- Indianapolis Colts (2024)*; Pittsburgh Steelers (2024)*; Cincinnati Bengals (2024)*; Hamilton Tiger-Cats (2026
- * Offseason or practice squad member only
- Stats at Pro Football Reference
- Stats at CFL.ca

Craig Young (born March 13, 2001) is an American professional football linebacker for the Hamilton Tiger-Cats of the Canadian Football League (CFL). He played college football for the Kansas Jayhawks and Ohio State Buckeyes.

== Early life ==
Young attended high school at Wayne. In Young's junior season, he hauled in 29 receptions for 367 yards and four touchdowns, while also making 27 tackles, a sack and a half, and three interceptions. Coming out of high school, Young was rated as a three star recruit where he held offers from schools such as Michigan State, Ohio State, and Wisconsin. Ultimately, Young committed to play college football for the Ohio State Buckeyes.

== College career ==
=== Ohio State ===
In Young's first two seasons in 2019 and 2020, he appeared in 14 games notching eight tackles. In week twelve of the 2021 season, Young recorded three tackles with half a tackle being for a loss in a win over Michigan State. Young finished the 2021 season playing in 12 games where he notched 15 tackles, half a sack, a pass deflection, an interception, and a touchdown. After the conclusion of the 2021 season, Young entered the NCAA transfer portal.

Young finished his career at Ohio State recording 23 tackles with half a tackle being for a loss, two interceptions, and a touchdown.

=== Kansas ===
Young transferred to play for the Kansas Jayhawks. In week three of the 2022 season, Young recorded seven tackles with one going for a loss, and a sack in a win over Houston. In the 2022 season, Young notched 60 tackles with five and a half being for a loss, four and a half sacks, an interception, and a forced fumble. In Young's final season in 2023, he posted 41 tackles with five being for a loss, a sack and a half, three pass deflections, and an interception. After the conclusion of the 2023 season, Young declared for the 2024 NFL draft and accepted an invite to the 2024 Hula Bowl.

== Professional career ==
Pre-draft measurables
Height	Weight	Arm length	Hand span	Wingspan	40-yard dash	10-yard split	20-yard split	20-yard shuttle	Three-cone drill	Vertical jump	Broad jump	Bench press
6 ft 3 in (1.91 m)	226 lb (103 kg)	33 in (0.84 m)	9 1/8 in (0.23 m)	6 ft 5 7/8 in (1.98 m)	4.57 s	1.66 s	2.64 s	4.47 s	7.27 s	37.0 in (0.94 m)	10 ft 8 in (3.25 m)	13 reps
All values from Pro Day

=== Indianapolis Colts ===
After going undrafted in the 2024 NFL draft, Young signed with the Indianapolis Colts as an undrafted free agent. He was waived on August 27, 2024.

=== Pittsburgh Steelers ===
On October 16, 2024, Young signed with the Pittsburgh Steelers practice squad. He was released on November 5.

=== Cincinnati Bengals ===
On December 24, 2024, Young was signed to the Cincinnati Bengals practice squad. He signed a reserve/future contract with Cincinnati on January 7, 2025. On August 25, Young was waived by the Bengals.

=== Hamilton Tiger-Cats ===
On December 30, 2025, it was announced that Young had signed with the Hamilton Tiger-Cats.
