= Hunter Dekkers =

American football player (born 2001)

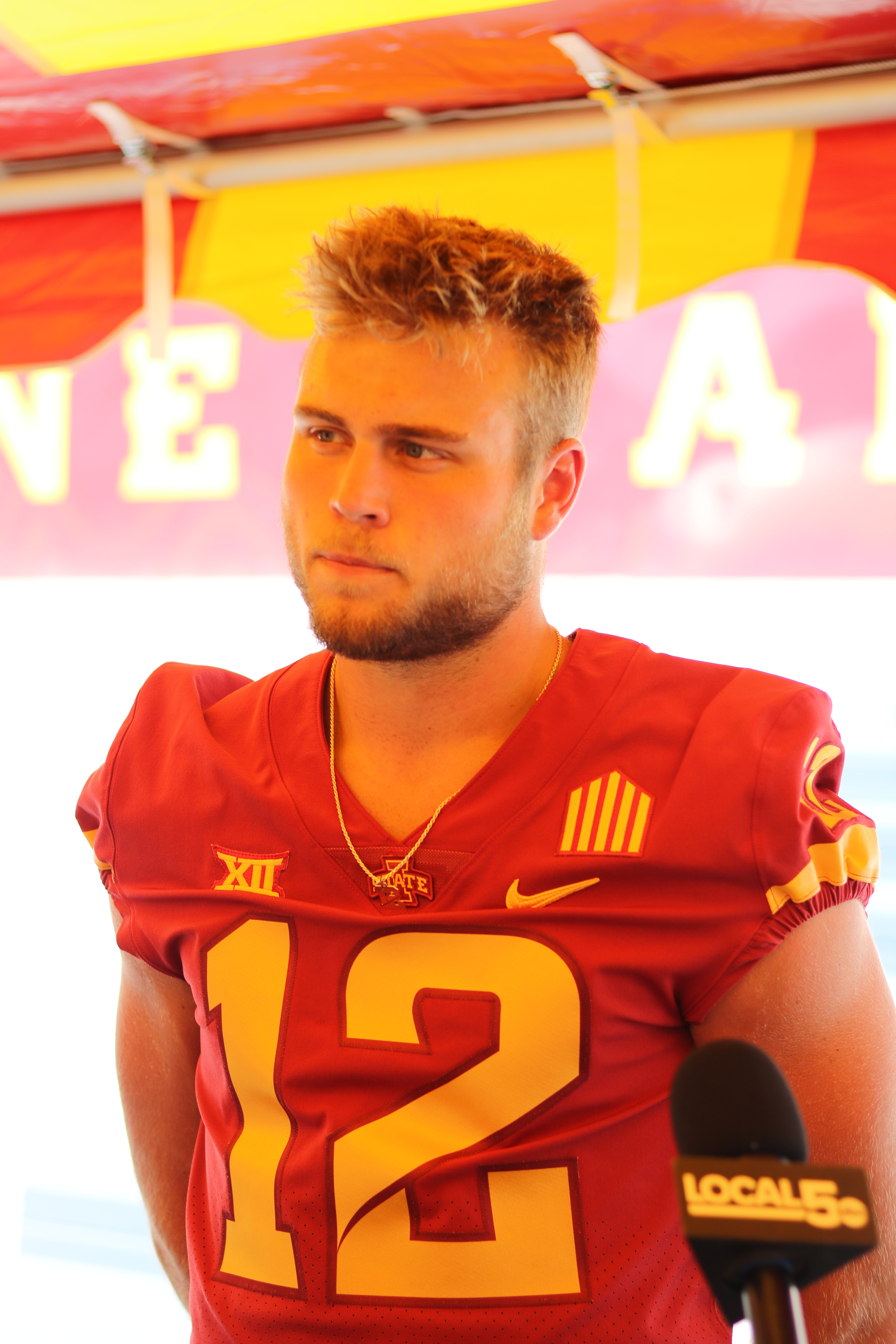
- Dekkers in 2022

Profile
- Position: Quarterback

Personal information
- Born: July 4, 2001 (age 25); Hawarden, Iowa, U.S.
- Listed height: 6 ft 2 in (1.88 m)
- Listed weight: 210 lb (95 kg)

Career information
- High school: West Sioux (Hawarden, Iowa)
- College: Iowa State (2020–2022); Iowa Western (2024)
- NFL draft: 2025: undrafted

Career history
- New Orleans Saints (2025)*; Houston Gamblers (2026); New Orleans Saints (2026)*
- * Offseason or practice squad member only
- Stats at Pro Football Reference

Hunter Dekkers (born July 4, 2001) is an American professional football quarterback. He played college football for the Iowa State Cyclones and Iowa Western Reivers.

== Early life ==
Dekkers grew up in Hawarden, Iowa on a cattle farm. He attended West Sioux High School, where he was a member of the football, basketball, baseball, and track teams. Dekkers set Iowa high school career records for most passing yards with 10,628 and touchdown passes with 126. Dekkers committed to play college football at Iowa State after considering offers from Purdue, Kansas State, and Indiana.

== College career ==
Dekkers played in three games as a true freshman before redshirting the season, completing five of seven pass attempts for 114 yards and one touchdown, and rushing for one touchdown. He spent his redshirt freshman season as the backup to starter Brock Purdy, completing 20 of 36 passes for 193 yards and two touchdowns and rushing four times for 61 yards and one touchdown in four games. Dekkers was named Iowa State's starter entering his redshirt sophomore season.

In May 2023, agents of the Iowa Division of Criminal Investigation executed a search warrant at Dekkers' apartment as part of a larger investigation into illegal sports gambling activity by several Iowa State athletes. On August 1, 2023, Dekkers was one of seven players indicted on records tampering charges related to his underage use of the gambling platform DraftKings. On September 3, Dekkers pled guilty to underage gambling and received a $645 fine. The charging affidavit said Dekkers placed 26 wagers on Iowa State sporting events, including a 2021 football game against Oklahoma State, when Dekkers was the team's backup quarterback. In all, he was accused of placing 366 bets that totaled more than $2,799, including 297 when he was under the age of 21, Iowa's minimum age for sports gambling.

Dekkers sat out the 2023 season after his appeal to the NCAA for reinstatement was denied. He played the 2024 season for Iowa Western Community College, leading it to an 11–2 record and a spot in the national title game, which it lost to Hutchinson Community College. He then entered the 2025 NFL draft; he went undrafted.

== Professional career ==
Pre-draft measurables
Height	Weight	Arm length	Hand span	Wingspan	40-yard dash	10-yard split	20-yard split	20-yard shuttle	Three-cone drill
6 ft 1 7/8 in (1.88 m)	207 lb (94 kg)	31 3/8 in (0.80 m)	9 3/4 in (0.25 m)	6 ft 3 1/2 in (1.92 m)	4.65 s	1.63 s	2.70 s	4.24 s	7.25 s
All values from Pro Day

=== New Orleans Saints ===
In April 2025, Dekkers was invited to New Orleans Saints rookie minicamp. On May 12, 2025, Dekkers officially signed with the Saints as an undrafted free agent. On July 31, the Saints released Dekkers. On August 6, Dekkers re-signed with the Saints. However, he was waived by New Orleans once more on August 14. Dekkers was signed to the practice squad on August 27. He was released again on September 4, and was re-signed to the practice squad on September 9. Dekkers was once more waived by the Saints on September 10, and was subsequently re-signed to the practice squad on September 18. On September 24, Dekkers was placed on the practice squad injured reserve after suffering a shoulder injury. On December 31, the Saints moved Dekkers to the active roster before the season's final game, a move that would allow the team to sign him to a futures contract in the offseason.

=== Houston Gamblers ===
On January 12, 2026, Dekkers signed with the Houston Gamblers of the United Football League (UFL).

=== New Orleans Saints (second stint) ===
On June 17, 2026, Dekkers signed with the New Orleans Saints. On August 29, he was waived by New Orleans as a part of preliminary roster cuts.

== Career statistics ==
=== UFL ===
Year	Team	Games			Passing									Rushing				
Year	Team	GP	GS	Record	Cmp	Att	Pct	Yds	Y/A	Lng	TD	Int	Rtg	Att	Yds	Avg	Lng	TD
2026	HOU	5	4	2–2	69	112	61.6	748	6.7	38	3	2	82.7	13	74	5.7	14	2
Career		5	4	2–2	69	112	61.6	748	6.7	38	3	2	82.7	13	74	5.7	14	2

=== College ===
Season	Team	Games			Passing								Rushing			
Season	Team	GP	GS	Record	Comp	Att	Pct	Yards	Avg	TD	Int	Rate	Att	Yards	Avg	TD
2020	Iowa State	3	0	—	5	7	71.4	118	16.9	1	0	260.2	3	12	4.0	1
2021	Iowa State	4	0	—	20	36	55.6	193	5.4	2	1	113.4	4	61	15.3	1
2022	Iowa State	12	12	4–8	302	457	66.1	3,044	6.7	19	14	129.6	89	73	0.8	2
2024	Iowa Western	13	13	11–2	288	449	64.1	3,806	8.5	32	10	154.4	44	−11	−0.8	1
JUCO career		13	13	11–2	288	449	64.1	3,806	8.5	32	10	154.4	44	−11	−0.8	1
FBS career		19	12	4–8	327	500	65.4	3,355	6.7	22	15	130.3	96	146	1.5	4
