= Memphis Tigers football statistical leaders =

The Memphis Tigers football statistical leaders are individual statistical leaders of the Memphis Tigers football program in various categories, including passing, rushing, receiving, total offense, defensive stats, and kicking. Within those areas, the lists identify single-game, single-season, and career leaders. The Tigers represent the University of Memphis in the NCAA Division I FBS American Conference.

Although Memphis began competing in intercollegiate football in 1912, the school's official record book considers the "modern era" to have begun in 1947. Records from before this year are often incomplete and inconsistent, and they are generally not included in these lists.

These lists are dominated by more recent players for several reasons:

- Since 1947, seasons have increased from 10 games to 11 and then 12 games in length.
- The NCAA didn't allow freshmen to play varsity football until 1972 (with the exception of the World War II years), allowing players to have four-year careers.
- Bowl games only began counting toward single-season and career statistics in 2002. The Tigers have played in eight bowl games since this decision, with a ninth now assured in 2018, giving many recent players an extra game to accumulate statistics.
- The Tigers have played in the American Championship Game twice, in 2017 and 2018. Normally, this gives players in those seasons yet another game to accumulate statistics. However, the Tigers were unable to play one of their originally scheduled games in 2017 due to disruptions resulting from Hurricane Irma.

These lists are updated through the 2018 American Championship Game.

== Passing ==
=== Passing yards ===
Career
Rk	Player	Yards	Years
1	Seth Henigan	14,278	2021 2022 2023 2024
2	Brady White	10,690	2018 2019 2020
3	Danny Wimprine	10,215	2001 2002 2003 2004
4	Paxton Lynch	8,863	2013 2014 2015
5	Riley Ferguson	7,955	2016 2017
6	Martin Hankins	5,770	2006 2007
7	Danny Sparkman	4,311	1983 1984 1985
8	Lloyd Patterson	4,201	1975 1976 1977 1978
9	Steve Matthews	3,980	1992 1993
10	Bernard Oden	2,686	1995 1996 1997

Single season
Rk	Player	Yards	Year
1	Riley Ferguson	4,257	2017
2	Brady White	4,014	2019
3	Seth Henigan	3,883	2023
4	Paxton Lynch	3,776	2015
5	Riley Ferguson	3,698	2016
6	Seth Henigan	3,571	2022
7	Seth Henigan	3,502	2024
8	Brady White	3,380	2020
9	Seth Henigan	3,322	2021
10	Brady White	3,296	2018

Single game
Rk	Player	Yards	Year	Opponent
1	Brady White	486	2020	UCF
2	Riley Ferguson	471	2017	Houston
	Riley Ferguson	471	2017	UCF (American Championship Game)
4	Seth Henigan	463	2021	Tulsa
5	Brady White	454	2019	Penn State (Cotton Bowl Classic)
	Seth Henigan	454	2024	UTSA
7	Paxton Lynch	447	2015	Tulsa
8	Brady White	437	2020	South Florida
9	Riley Ferguson	431	2017	Connecticut
10	Seth Henigan	417	2021	Arkansas State

=== Passing touchdowns ===
Career
Rk	Player	TDs	Years
1	Seth Henigan	104	2021 2022 2023 2024
2	Brady White	90	2018 2019 2020
3	Danny Wimprine	81	2001 2002 2003 2004
4	Riley Ferguson	70	2016 2017
5	Paxton Lynch	59	2013 2014 2015
6	Martin Hankins	43	2006 2007
7	Steve Matthews	31	1992 1993
8	Lloyd Patterson	30	1975 1976 1977 1978
9	Danny Sparkman	27	1983 1984 1985
10	James Earl Wright	26	1959 1960 1961

Single season
Rk	Player	TDs	Year
1	Riley Ferguson	38	2017
2	Brady White	33	2019
3	Riley Ferguson	32	2016
	Seth Henigan	32	2023
5	Brady White	31	2020
6	Paxton Lynch	28	2015
7	Brady White	26	2018
8	Martin Hankins	25	2007
	Seth Henigan	25	2021
	Seth Henigan	25	2024

Single game
Rk	Player	TDs	Year	Opponent
1	Paxton Lynch	7	2015	SMU
	Riley Ferguson	7	2017	Connecticut
3	Riley Ferguson	6	2016	Bowling Green
	Brady White	6	2020	UCF
5	Danny Wimprine	5	2002	Murray State
	Brady White	5	2018	Mercer
	Brady White	5	2018	Georgia State
	Brady White	5	2019	Tulane
	Seth Henigan	5	2021	Arkansas State
	Marcus Stokes	5	2026	Charlotte

== Rushing ==
=== Rushing yards ===
Career
Rk	Player	Yards	Years
1	DeAngelo Williams	6,026	2002 2003 2004 2005
2	Darrell Henderson	3,545	2016 2017 2018
3	Patrick Taylor Jr	2,884	2016 2017 2018 2019
4	Dave Casinelli	2,636	1960 1961 1962 1963
5	Curtis Steele	2,462	2008 2009
6	Brandon Hayes	2,385	2012 2013 2014
7	Gerard Arnold	2,378	1997 1998 1999
8	Joseph Doss	2,339	2004 2005 2006 2007
9	Paul Gowen	2,227	1969 1970 1971
10	Larry Porter	2,194	1990 1991 1992 1993

Single season
Rk	Player	Yards	Year
1	DeAngelo Williams	1,964	2005
2	DeAngelo Williams	1,948	2004
3	Darrell Henderson	1,909	2018
4	Kenneth Gainwell	1,459	2019
5	DeAngelo Williams	1,430	2003
6	Mario Anderson Jr.	1,362	2024
7	Curtis Steele	1,239	2009
8	Curtis Steele	1,223	2008
9	Darrell Henderson	1,154	2017
10	Blake Watson	1,152	2023

Single game
Rk	Player	Yards	Year	Opponent
1	DeAngelo Williams	263	2004	South Florida
2	DeAngelo Williams	262	2004	Houston
3	Paul Gowen	260	1969	Tulsa
4	Curtis Steele	240	2009	UTEP
5	DeAngelo Williams	238	2005	Akron
6	DeAngelo Williams	236	2005	UTEP
7	Darrell Henderson	233	2018	Georgia State
8	Curtis Steele	232	2009	Tulsa
9	DeAngelo Williams	226	2005	East Carolina
10	DeAngelo Williams	225	2004	East Carolina

=== Rushing touchdowns ===
Career
Rk	Player	TDs	Years
1	DeAngelo Williams	55	2002 2003 2004 2005
2	Dave Casinelli	36	1960 1961 1962 1963
	Darrell Henderson	36	2016 2017 2018
	Patrick Taylor Jr.	36	2016 2017 2018 2019
5	Brandon Thomas	35	2020 2021 2022 2023 2024
6	Jay McCoy	27	1968 1969 1970
7	Alex Williams	23	1949 1950
8	Curtis Steele	22	2008 2009
9	Doroland Dorceus	21	2013 2014 2015 2016
10	Russ Vollmer	20	1960 1961 1962 1963
	Larry Porter	20	1990 1991 1992 1993

Single season
Rk	Player	TDs	Year
1	DeAngelo Williams	22	2004
	Darrell Henderson	22	2018
3	DeAngelo Williams	18	2005
	Mario Anderson Jr.	18	2024
5	Patrick Taylor Jr.	16	2018
6	Curtis Steele	15	2009
7	Dave Casinelli	14	1963
	Blake Watson	14	2023
9	DeAngelo Williams	13	2003
	Paxton Lynch	13	2014
	Patrick Taylor Jr.	13	2017
	Kenneth Gainwell	13	2019

Single game
Rk	Player	TDs	Year	Opponent
1	Dante Brown	4	2001	Houston
	DeAngelo Williams	4	2004	Chattanooga
	DeAngelo Williams	4	2004	Houston
	DeAngelo Williams	4	2004	East Carolina
	Curtis Steele	4	2009	Tulsa
	Patrick Taylor Jr.	4	2017	Houston
	Mario Anderson Jr.	4	2024	North Texas
	Jaylin Carter	4	2026	Arkansas State

== Receiving ==
=== Receptions ===
Career
Rk	Player	Rec	Years
1	Anthony Miller	238	2015 2016 2017
2	Duke Calhoun	212	2006 2007 2008 2009
3	Damonte Coxie	185	2017 2018 2019 2020
4	Carlos Singleton	164	2006 2007 2008 2009
5	Roc Taylor	163	2021 2022 2023 2024
6	Calvin Austin III	156	2018 2019 2020 2021
7	Damien Dodson	147	1996 1997 1998 1999
8	Phil Mayhue	143	2014 2015 2016 2017
9	Darron White	137	2001 2002 2003 2004
10	Mose Frazier	135	2013 2014 2015

Single season
Rk	Player	Rec	Year
1	Anthony Miller	96	2017
2	Anthony Miller	95	2016
3	Damonte Coxie	76	2019
4	Isaac Bruce	74	1993
	Calvin Austin III	74	2021
6	Damonte Coxie	72	2018
7	Tannar Rehrer	70	2011
	Mose Frazier	70	2015
9	Roc Taylor	69	2023
10	Duke Calhoun	68	2009

Single game
Rk	Player	Rec	Year	Opponent
1	Anthony Miller	15	2016	Houston
	Anthony Miller	15	2017	Connecticut
3	Anthony Miller	14	2017	UCF (American Championship Game)
4	Maurice Avery	13	2003	UAB
	Calvin Austin III	13	2021	Tulsa
6	Steven Black	12	2007	SMU
	Anthony Miller	12	2016	Tulsa
8	Carlos Singleton	11	2008	Marshall
	Duke Calhoun	11	2009	Southern Miss
	Tannar Rehrer	11	2011	Rice
	Anthony Miller	11	2016	Western Kentucky (Boca Raton Bowl)
	Cortez Braham Jr.	11	2025	Tulane

=== Receiving yards ===
Career
Rk	Player	Yards	Years
1	Anthony Miller	3,590	2015 2016 2017
2	Duke Calhoun	2,981	2006 2007 2008 2009
3	Damonte Coxie	2,948	2017 2018 2019 2020
4	Calvin Austin III	2,541	2018 2019 2020 2021
5	Roc Taylor	2,375	2021 2022 2023 2024
6	Carlos Singleton	2,365	2006 2007 2008 2009
7	Earnest Gray	2,123	1975 1976 1977 1978
8	Phil Mayhue	2,110	2014 2015 2016 2017
9	Damien Dodson	2,096	1996 1997 1998 1999
10	Sean Dykes	1,826	2016 2017 2018 2019 2020 2021

Single season
Rk	Player	Yards	Year
1	Anthony Miller	1,462	2017
2	Anthony Miller	1,434	2016
3	Damonte Coxie	1,276	2019
4	Damonte Coxie	1,174	2018
5	Calvin Austin III	1,149	2021
6	Roc Taylor	1,083	2023
7	Isaac Bruce	1,054	1993
8	Calvin Austin III	1,053	2020
9	Roc Taylor	950	2024
10	Duke Calhoun	923	2009

Single game
Rk	Player	Yards	Year	Opponent
1	Anthony Miller	250	2016	Tulsa
2	Calvin Austin III	239	2021	Arkansas State
3	Hunter Tipton	229	2026	Boise State
4	Anthony Miller	224	2017	Connecticut
5	Kenneth Gainwell	203	2019	Tulane
6	Calvin Austin III	200	2021	Tulsa
7	Anthony Miller	195	2017	UCF (American Championship Game)
8	Bob Sherlag	186	1965	Mississippi State
9	Anthony Miller	185	2017	UCLA
10	Calvin Austin III	184	2020	Temple

=== Receiving touchdowns ===
Career
Rk	Player	TDs	Years
1	Anthony Miller	37	2015 2016 2017
2	Carlos Singleton	22	2006 2007 2008 2009
	Calvin Austin III	22	2018 2019 2020 2021
4	Damonte Coxie	20	2017 2018 2019 2020
5	Tavares Gideon	19	2002 2004
	Duke Calhoun	19	2006 2007 2008 2009
	Sean Dykes	19	2016 2017 2018 2019 2020 2021
8	Earnest Gray	17	1975 1976 1977 1978
9	Bill Robertson	16	1947 1948 1949 1950
10	Isaac Bruce	15	1992 1993

Single season
Rk	Player	TDs	Year
1	Anthony Miller	18	2017
2	Anthony Miller	14	2016
3	Bill Robertson	12	1950
4	Tavares Gideon	11	2004
	Carlos Singleton	11	2007
	Calvin Austin III	11	2020
7	Isaac Bruce	10	1993
8	Bob Sherlag	9	1965
	Earnest Gray	9	1978
	Damonte Coxie	9	2019

Single game
Rk	Player	TDs	Year	Opponent
1	Anthony Miller	4	2017	Connecticut
2	Bill Robertson	3	1950	Arkansas State
	Don Coffey	3	1961	Tulsa
	Bob Sherlag	3	1965	Mississippi State
	Stan Davis	3	1971	Ole Miss
	Russell Copeland	3	1992	Tennessee
	Carlos Singleton	3	2007	SMU
	Anthony Miller	3	2016	Western Kentucky (Boca Raton Bowl)
	Anthony Miller	3	2017	UCF (American Championship Game)
	Calvin Austin III	3	2021	Arkansas State

== Total offense ==
Total offense is the sum of passing and rushing statistics. It does not include receiving or returns.

=== Total offense yards ===
Career
Rk	Player	Yards	Years
1	Seth Henigan	15,178	2021 2022 2023 2024
2	Brady White	10,664	2018 2019 2020
3	Danny Wimprine	10,634	2001 2002 2003 2004
4	Paxton Lynch	9,550	2013 2014 2015
5	Riley Ferguson	7,907	2016 2017
6	DeAngelo Williams	6,026	2002 2003 2004 2005
7	Martin Hankins	5,757	2006 2007
8	Lloyd Patterson	4,568	1975 1976 1977 1978
9	Danny Sparkman	4,365	1983 1984 1985
10	Steve Matthews	3,591	1992 1993

Single season
Rk	Player	Yards	Year
1	Riley Ferguson	4,279	2017
2	Seth Henigan	4,157	2023
3	Paxton Lynch	4,015	2015
4	Brady White	3,943	2019
5	Seth Henigan	3,860	2022
6	Seth Henigan	3,692	2024
7	Riley Ferguson	3,628	2016
8	Seth Henigan	3,469	2021
9	Brady White	3,468	2020
10	Paxton Lynch	3,352	2014

Single game
Rk	Player	Yards	Year	Opponent
1	Brady White	516	2020	UCF
2	Seth Henigan	500	2021	Tulsa
3	Riley Ferguson	466	2017	UCF (American Championship Game)
4	Riley Ferguson	465	2017	Houston
5	Paxton Lynch	464	2015	Cincinnati
6	Seth Henigan	462	2024	UTSA
7	Paxton Lynch	453	2015	Tulsa
8	Brady White	451	2020	South Florida
9	Brady White	431	2019	Penn State (Cotton Bowl Classic)
10	Riley Ferguson	420	2017	Connecticut

=== Total touchdowns ===
Career
Rk	Player	TDs	Years
1	Seth Henigan	114	2021 2022 2023 2024
2	Brady White	97	2018 2019 2020
3	Danny Wimprine	92	2001 2002 2003 2004
4	Riley Ferguson	80	2016 2017
5	Paxton Lynch	76	2013 2014 2015
6	DeAngelo Williams	55	2002 2003 2004 2005
7	Lloyd Patterson	49	1975 1976 1977 1978
8	Martin Hankins	43	2006 2007
9	James Earl Wright	38	1959 1960 1961
10	Dave Casinelli	36	1960 1961 1962 1963
	Darrell Henderson	36	2016 2017 2018

Single season
Rk	Player	TDs	Year
1	Riley Ferguson	44	2017
2	Brady White	37	2019
	Seth Henigan	37	2023
4	Riley Ferguson	36	2016
5	Paxton Lynch	35	2014
6	Brady White	33	2020
7	Paxton Lynch	30	2015
8	Brady White	27	2018
9	Danny Wimprine	26	2003
	Seth Henigan	26	2022
	Seth Henigan	26	2024

Single game
Rk	Player	TDs	Year	Opponent
1	Paxton Lynch	7	2014	BYU (Miami Beach Bowl)
	Paxton Lynch	7	2015	SMU
	Riley Ferguson	7	2016	Bowling Green
	Riley Ferguson	7	2017	Connecticut
	Brady White	7	2020	UCF

== Defense ==
=== Interceptions ===
Career
Rk	Player	Ints	Years
1	David Berrong	17	1967 1968 1969
2	Jerry Todd	16	1967 1968 1969
3	Eric Harris	13	1973 1974 1975 1976
	Glenn Sumter	13	1998 1999 2000
5	Bill Brundzo	12	1965 1966 1967
	Steve Jaggard	12	1965 1966 1967
	Glenn Rogers Jr.	12	1988 1989 1990
	Bobby McCain	12	2011 2012 2013 2014
9	Keith Spann	11	1993 1994 1995 1996

Single season
Rk	Player	Ints	Year
1	Jerry Todd	11	1968
2	David Berrong	8	1969
	Steve Jaggard	8	1969
4	Eddie Moore	7	1988
5	Bill Brundzo	6	1966
	Walter Daggett	6	1971
	Percy Nabors	6	1983
	Glenn Sumter	6	2001
	Bobby McCain	6	2013

Single game
Rk	Player	Ints	Year	Opponent
1	Bob Ford	3	1952	Murray State
	Olie Cordill	3	1965	Mississippi State
	Keith Simpson	3	1977	North Texas
	Eddie Moore	3	1988	Tulane
	Bobby McCain	3	2013	South Florida

=== Tackles ===
Career
Rk	Player	Tackles	Years
1	Danton Barto	473	1990 1991 1992 1993
2	Michael Thomas	454	1977 1978 1979 1980
3	Eric Fairs	435	1982 1983 1984 1985
4	Kamal Shakir	416	1997 1998 1999 2000
5	Keith Butler	384	1974 1975 1976 1977
6	Todd Ondra	372	1978 1979 1980
7	Jerry Dandridge	368	1972 1973 1974 1975
	Octavian Sharp	368	1984 1985 1986

Single season
Rk	Player	Tackles	Year
1	Michael Thomas	162	1980
2	Dave Pawlik	161	1971
3	Keith Butler	152	1977
4	Todd Ondra	147	1980
5	Jamon Hughes	147	2010
6	Todd Ondra	144	1979
	Danton Barto	144	1993
8	Kamal Shakir	143	1999
9	Glenn Sumter	137	2001

Single game
Rk	Player	Tackles	Year	Opponent
1	Pete Scatamacchia	25	1979	Louisville
2	Alex Dees	21	1968	Southern Miss
	Tommy James	21	1970	Utah State
	Jamon Hughes	21	2010	Southern Miss
5	John Allen	20	1968	Houston
	Glenn Whittemore	20	1973	Southern Miss
	Todd Ondra	20	1979	Texas A&M
	Mike Kleimeyer	20	1981	Tennessee
	Kamal Shakir	20	1999	Army

=== Sacks ===
Career
Rk	Player	Sacks	Years
1	Martin Ifedi	22.5	2011 2012 2013 2014
2	Tramont Lawless	22.0	1996 1997 1998 1999
3	Marquis Bowling	20.0	1995 1996 1997 1998
4	Marlon Brown	19.0	1985 1986 1987 1988
5	Tim Harris	18.0	1982 1983 1984 1985
	Bryce Huff	18.0	2016 2017 2018 2019
7	Marvin Thomas	17.0	1983 1984 1985 1986
	Andre Arnold	17.0	1998 1999 2000
	Tony Brown	17.0	1999 2000 2001 2002
10	Brian Barnett	15.0	1992 1993 1994 1995
	Jonathan Wilson	15.0	2016 2017 2018 2019

Single season
Rk	Player	Sacks	Year
1	Andre Arnold	13.0	2000
2	Martin Ifedi	11.5	2013
3	Cedric Wright	11.0	1983
	Marlon Brown	11.0	1987
	Marquis Bowling	11.0	1997
6	David Brandon	10.0	1986
7	Bryce Huff	9.5	2018
8	Bryan Barnett	9.0	1994
	Tramont Lawless	9.0	1999

Single game
Rk	Player	Sacks	Year	Opponent
1	Marlon Brown	4.0	1987	Louisville
	James Logan	4.0	1994	Arkansas State
	Clinton McDonald	4.0	2008	Arkansas State

== Kicking ==
=== Field goals made ===
Career
Rk	Player	FGs	Years
1	Jake Elliott	81	2013 2014 2015 2016
2	Stephen Gostkowski	70	2002 2003 2004 2005
3	Riley Patterson	64	2017 2018 2019 2020
4	Joe Allison	51	1990 1991 1992 1993
5	Ryan White	49	1998 1999 2000 2001
6	John Butler	48	1986 1987 1988 1989
7	Matt Reagan	46	2006 2007 2008 2009
8	Don Glosson	34	1983 1984 1985
9	Rusty Bennett	30	1977 1978 1979 1980

Single season
Rk	Player	FGs	Year
1	Joe Allison	23	1992
	Jake Elliott	23	2015
	Riley Patterson	23	2019
4	Stephen Gostkowski	22	2005
5	Jake Elliott	21	2014
	Jake Elliott	21	2016
	Chris Howard	21	2022
8	Stephen Gostkowski	20	2004
9	Stephen Gostkowski	19	2003
10	John Butler	16	1989
	Ryan White	16	1998
	Jake Elliott	16	2013

Single game
Rk	Player	FGs	Year	Opponent
1	Ryan White	5	1999	UAB
	Jake Elliott	5	2013	Houston
	Joe Doyle	5	2021	Nicholls

=== Field goal percentage ===
Career
Rk	Player	FG%	Years
1	Chris Howard	87.5%	2022
2	Jake Elliott	77.9%	2013 2014 2015 2016
3	Riley Patterson	77.1%	2017 2018 2019 2020
4	Tanner Gillis	76.9%	2022 2023
5	John Butler	76.2%	1986 1987 1988 1989
6	Stephen Gostkowski	76.1%	2002 2003 2004 2005
7	Ryan White	73.1%	1998 1999 2000 2001
8	Gianni Spetic	75.0%	2025
9	Joe Allison	71.8%	1990 1991 1992 1993
10	Matt Reagan	69.7%	2006 2007 2008 2009

Single season
Rk	Player	FG%	Year
1	Ryan White	100.0%	1998
2	Joe Allison	92.0%	1992
	Riley Patterson	92.0%	2019
