= Seth Henigan =

American football player (born 2003)

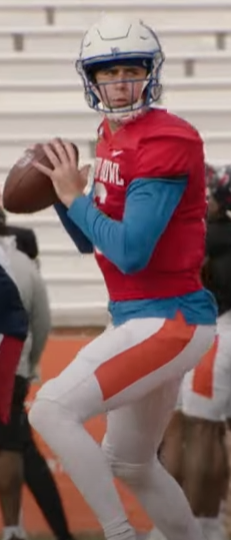
- Henigan at the 2025 Senior Bowl

Profile
- Position: Quarterback

Personal information
- Born: March 10, 2003 (age 23); Denton, Texas, U.S.
- Listed height: 6 ft 3 in (1.91 m)
- Listed weight: 215 lb (98 kg)

Career information
- High school: Billy Ryan (Denton, Texas)
- College: Memphis (2021–2024)
- NFL draft: 2025: undrafted

Career history
- Jacksonville Jaguars (2025)*; Indianapolis Colts (2025)*
- * Offseason or practice squad member only

Awards and highlights
- Second-team All-AAC (2023); Third-team All-AAC (2024)
- Stats at Pro Football Reference

Seth Henigan (born March 10, 2003) is an American professional football quarterback. He played college football for the Memphis Tigers.

== Early life ==
Henigan played high school football at Billy Ryan High School in Denton, Texas. He led Denton Ryan to a 39–2 record from 2018 to 2020 and totaled 7,234 passing yards and 79 passing touchdowns with only 14 interceptions.

== College career ==
As a true freshman in 2021, Henigan won the starting quarterback job at Memphis. He became the first true freshman to start a season opener in the history of the Memphis football program. In his Tigers debut, Henigan threw for 265 yards on 19 of 32 attempts and one touchdown in a 42–17 victory over Nicholls. In his second collegiate game, he threw for 417 yards and five touchdowns against Arkansas State and was named National Player of the Week. In week six, Henigan completed 34 of 57 passes for a career high 463 yards, two touchdowns and two interceptions in a loss against Tulsa. He finished the 2021 regular season with 3,322 passing yards, 25 touchdowns, and eight interceptions.

As a sophomore in 2022, Henigan threw for a season high 415 yards in a victory over Navy. He led the Tigers to a victory against Utah State in the 2022 First Responder Bowl and was named MVP of the game.

In 2023, Henigan threw for a conference best 3,883 yards on 318 of 476 attempts. He also led threw a career high 32 touchdowns to nine interceptions. He led the Tigers to their first 10 win season since the 2019 season. Against Iowa State in the 2023 Liberty Bowl, Henigan threw for 364 yards and four touchdowns. His performance earned him the games Most Valuable Player award.

In week three of the 2024 season, Henigan led the Tigers to a victory over Florida State. Henigan completed 25 of 38 attempts for 272 yards with two touchdowns and an interception while extending his streak of throwing a touchdown pass in every game of his career to 40 games. For his performance, he was named AAC Offensive Player of the Week. His touchdowns thrown streak tied him for the third longest in NCAA history with former Heisman Trophy winner Baker Mayfield. He extended his streak with a touchdown pass to 41 games in a loss against Navy to move in to a tie with former heisman trophy winner Marcus Mariota for the second longest streak in FBS history. Henigan's streak was snapped the following week in a victory over Middle Tennessee. Henigan threw a game winning touchdown pass in the games final minute against Charlotte, becoming to Memphis' all-time touchdown leader. He surpassed Brady White's 90 touchdowns mark. In week twelve, Henigan threw four touchdown passes in a victory over UAB to surpass 100 career touchdown passes.

He played in the 2025 Senior Bowl and threw a game winning touchdown pass to Jack Bech on the final play of the game.

=== Statistics ===
	Memphis record
*	Led the conference
**Bold**	Career best

Season	Team	Games			Passing								Rushing			
Season	Team	GP	GS	Record	Cmp	Att	Pct	Yds	Avg	TD	Int	Rtg	Att	Yds	Avg	TD
2021	Memphis	11	11	6–5	235	393	59.8	3,322	**8.5**	25	8	147.7	80	147	1.8	0
2022	Memphis	**13**	**13**	7–6	285	445	64.0	3,559	8.0	22	8	143.9	**146**	**287**	2.0	4
2023	Memphis	**13**	**13**	10–3	***318**	*476	**66.8**	***3,883**	8.2	***32**	**9**	**153.7**	94	274	**2.9**	**5**
2024	Memphis	**13**	**13**	**11−2**	309	**477**	64.8	3,502	7.3	25	6	141.2	80	190	2.4	1
Career		50	50	34−16	1,148	1,792	64.1	14,278	8.0	104	31	146.7	400	900	2.3	10

== Professional career ==
Pre-draft measurables
Height	Weight	Arm length	Hand span	Wingspan	40-yard dash	10-yard split	20-yard split	20-yard shuttle	Three-cone drill	Vertical jump	Broad jump
6 ft 3 in (1.91 m)	215 lb (98 kg)	32 in (0.81 m)	9 in (0.23 m)	6 ft 4 3/4 in (1.95 m)	4.76 s	1.60 s	2.80 s	4.44 s	7.34 s	31.5 in (0.80 m)	9 ft 6 in (2.90 m)
All values from NFL Combine

=== Jacksonville Jaguars ===
On April 27, 2025, after going undrafted in the 2025 NFL draft, Henigan signed with the Jacksonville Jaguars as an undrafted free agent. He was waived on August 26 as part of final roster cuts. He was signed to the practice squad on August 27. On September 29, Henigan was released by Jacksonville.

=== Indianapolis Colts ===
Henigan was signed to the Indianapolis Colts' practice squad on December 29, 2025. He signed a reserve/future contract with Indianapolis on January 5, 2026. Henigan was waived by Indianapolis on June 1.
