= 2022 First Responder Bowl =

Postseason college football bowl game

2022 Servpro First Responder Bowl
- 13th First Responder Bowl
Memphis Tigers	Utah State Aggies
(6–6)	(6–6)
AAC	MWC
38	10
Head coach: Ryan Silverfield	Head coach: Blake Anderson
	1	2	3	4	Total
Memphis	3	21	0	14	38
Utah State	0	3	0	7	10
- Date: December 27, 2022
- Season: 2022
- Stadium: Gerald J. Ford Stadium
- Location: University Park, Texas
- MVP: Seth Henigan (QB, Memphis)
- Favorite: Memphis by 8
- Referee: Francisco Villar (Pac-12)
- Attendance: 10,343
- Payout: US$824,545

United States TV coverage
- Network: ESPN
- Announcers: Mike Monaco (play-by-play), Charles Arbuckle (analyst), and Nicole Regoni (sideline)

International TV coverage
- Network: ESPN Deportes

The 2022 First Responder Bowl was a college football bowl game played on December 27, 2022, at Gerald J. Ford Stadium in University Park, Texas. The 13th annual First Responder Bowl, the game featured Memphis of the American Athletic Conference and Utah State of the Mountain West Conference. The game began at 2:20 p.m. CST and was aired on ESPN. It was one of the 2022–23 bowl games concluding the 2022 FBS football season. Sponsored by cleanup and restoration company Servpro, the game was officially known as the Servpro First Responder Bowl.

== Teams ==
Based on conference tie-ins, the game was expected to feature teams from the American Athletic Conference (The American), the Atlantic Coast Conference (ACC), or the Big 12 Conference. Selected for the bowl were Memphis, of The American, and Utah State, of the Mountain West Conference. This was their eighth meeting; entering the game, the Tigers led the all-time series, 4–3.

=== Memphis Tigers ===
Memphis compiled a 6–6 record in regular-season play, 3–5 in conference play. Their season included a four-game winning streak followed by a four-game losing streak. The Tigers faced two ranked teams, losing to both Tulane and UCF. Entering this game, Memphis had been invited to a bowl game each season since 2014, including the 2021 Hawaii Bowl, which was canceled the day before kickoff.

=== Utah State Aggies ===
Utah State also recorded a 6–6 regular-season record; they went 5–3 in conference play. After starting the season 1–4, the Aggies then won five of their remaining seven games to become bowl eligible. They faced, and lost to, two ranked FBS teams, Alabama and BYU. This was the Aggies' 10th bowl appearance since the 2011 season.

== Game summary ==
2022 Servpro First Responder Bowl

Quarter	1	2	3	4	Total
Memphis	3	21	0	14	38
Utah State	0	3	0	7	10

at Gerald J. Ford Stadium • Dallas, Texas

- Date: Tuesday, December 27, 2022
- Game time: 2:15 p.m. CST
- Game weather: Sunny • Temperature: 49 °F (9 °C) • Wind: 4 mph (6.4 km/h) southeast
- Referee: Francisco Villar
- TV announcers (ESPN): Mike Monaco (play-by-play), Charles Arbuckle (analyst), and Nicole Regoni (sideline)
- Box score

Scoring summary

Quarter	Time	Drive			Team	Scoring information	Score	
Quarter	Time	Plays	Yards	TOP	Team	Scoring information	Memphis	Utah State
1	1:05	12	64	5:14	Memphis	26-yard field goal by Chris Howard	3	0
2	12:13	9	37	3:52	Utah State	53-yard field goal by Connor Coles	3	3
2	7:24	8	72	4:49	Memphis	Eddie Lewis 15-yard touchdown reception from Seth Henigan, Chris Howard kick good	10	3
2	2:56	5	50	2:26	Memphis	Eddie Lewis 22-yard touchdown reception from Seth Henigan, Chris Howard kick good	17	3
2	0:24	10	52	1:38	Memphis	Caden Prieskorn 3-yard touchdown reception from Seth Henigan, Chris Howard kick good	24	3
4	11:04	5	92	1:48	Utah State	Brian Cobbs 44-yard touchdown reception from Bishop Davenport, Connor Coles kick good	24	10
4	7:22	7	47	3:42	Memphis	Jevyon Ducker 1-yard touchdown run, Chris Howard kick good	31	10
4	3:16	5	58	1:54	Memphis	Jevyon Ducker 48-yard touchdown run, Chris Howard kick good	38	10
"TOP" = time of possession. For other American football terms, see Glossary of American football.							38	10

== Statistics ==
Team statistical comparison
Statistic	Memphis	Utah State
First downs	26	15
First downs rushing	11	7
First downs passing	14	7
First downs penalty	1	1
Third down efficiency	7–14	5–13
Fourth down efficiency	0–0	0–1
Total plays–net yards	76–430	58–261
Rushing attempts–net yards	47–146	35–126
Yards per rush	3.1	3.6
Yards passing	9.8	5.9
Pass completions–attempts	20–29	15–23
Interceptions thrown	0	3
Punt returns–total yards	2–8	1–1
Kickoff returns–total yards	1–26	4–121
Punts–average yardage	4–148	5–188
Fumbles–lost	1–1	0–0
Penalties–yards	5–55	8–54
Time of possession	34:16	23:54

Memphis statistics
Tigers passing
	C–A	Yds	TD–INT
Seth Henigan	20–29	284	3–0
Tigers rushing
	Car	Yds	TD
Jevyon Ducker	13	83	2
Asa Martin	10	43	0
Gabriel Rogers	2	26	0
Sutton Smith	6	20	0
Roc Taylor	1	5	0
Joseph Scates	1	4	0
TEAM	3	-9	0
Seth Henigan	11	-26	0
Tigers receiving
	Rec	Yds	TD
Eddie Lewis	5	83	2
Gabriel Rogers	4	58	0
Roc Taylor	4	48	0
Joseph Scates	1	42	0
Jevyon Ducker	1	15	0
Koby Drake	1	12	0
Asa Martin	1	10	0
Caden Prieskorn	2	9	1
Cameron Wright	1	7	0

Utah State statistics
Aggies passing
	C–A	Yds	TD–INT
Bishop Davenport	7–9	100	1–1
Cooper Legas	7–12	34	0–1
Levi Williams	1–2	1	0–1
Aggies rushing
	Car	Yds	TD
Calvin Tyler Jr.	16	79	0
Cooper Legas	12	25	0
Levi Williams	2	15	0
Terrell Vaughn	2	6	0
Bishop Davenport	1	1	0
Jordan Wilmore	2	0	0
Aggies receiving
	Rec	Yds	TD
Brian Cobbs	6	79	1
Terrell Vaughn	4	34	0
Josh Sterzer	2	12	0
Otto Tia	1	9	0
Calvin Tyler Jr.	2	1	0
