= 2016 Boca Raton Bowl =

- 3rd Boca Raton Bowl
Memphis Tigers	Western Kentucky Hilltoppers
(8–4)	(10–3)
The American	C-USA
31	51
Head coach: Mike Norvell	Head coach: Nick Holt
	1	2	3	4	Total
Memphis	10	7	7	7	31
Western Kentucky	14	14	16	7	51
- Date: December 20, 2016
- Season: 2016
- Stadium: FAU Stadium
- Location: Boca Raton, Florida
- MVP: Offense: Western Kentucky RB Anthony Wales; Defense: Western Kentucky LB Keith Brown
- Favorite: Western Kentucky by 4
- National anthem: Maggie Baugh
- Referee: Don Willard (Big Ten)
- Attendance: 24,726
- Payout: US$400,000

United States TV coverage
- Network: ESPN
- Announcers: Dave LaMont, Desmond Howard, Quint Kessenich Radio Marc Kestecher, John Congemi, Brett McMurphy

The 2016 Boca Raton Bowl was a post-season American college football bowl game played on December 20, 2016, at FAU Stadium in Boca Raton, Florida. The third annual edition of the Boca Raton Bowl was one of the 2016–17 bowl games concluding the 2016 FBS football season.

== Team selection ==
The game typically features conference tie-ins from the American Athletic Conference and the Mid-American Conference. However, the 2016 participants were the University of Memphis Tigers of the AAC and the Western Kentucky Hilltoppers, who won the championship of Conference USA.

This was the sixth meeting between the schools, with the all-time series tied 2–2–1. The most recent meeting was on October 27, 1956, where the Tigers (then known as the Memphis State Tigers) defeated the Hilltoppers by a score of 42–0.

=== Memphis Tigers ===
The Tigers finished the regular season with a record of 8–4. They formally accepted the bowl invitation to play in the Boca Raton Bowl on December 4, 2016.

=== Western Kentucky Hilltoppers ===
Following a 10–3 regular season, the Hilltoppers accepted the invitation to play at the Boca Raton Bowl. On December 5, Hilltoppers head coach Jeff Brohm left to fill the head coaching vacancy at Purdue University, with defensive coordinator Nick Holt named as interim head coach for the bowl game.

== Game summary ==
The game started with both high-powered offenses stalling and going three-and-out. Memphis scored on their second drive, and the Hilltoppers responded with a touchdown of their own. Memphis's third drive ended with a field goal, while WKU pulled a trick play on first and goal – QB Mike White lateraled the ball to offensive lineman Forrest Lamp, who caught the ball and ran nine yards for the touchdown, giving Western Kentucky a four-point lead. With 1:10 left in the first quarter, Western Kentucky defender Joel Iyiegbuniwe was ejected on a targeting call when he hit Memphis's Tony Pollard with his facemask while Pollard was attempting to catch the ball. The first quarter ended 14–10, WKU. The Tigers' fourth drive ended 48 seconds into the second quarter when kicker Jake Elliott hit the left upright on a 45-yard field goal, keeping the score 14–10. The Hilltoppers extended their lead to 11 with just under twelve minutes left in the 2nd as they capped their fourth drive with a 37-yard touchdown pass. Memphis responded just two minutes later with a touchdown pass of their own, cutting the lead back down to four. WKU then marched down the field, taking just under seven minutes, and scored on a 2-yard rush to culminate a 13 play drive, and took a 28–17 lead into halftime. The Hilltoppers got the ball to start the second half and, on the fourth play of the third quarter, scored on a 41-yard touchdown pass, extending their lead to 18. Memphis turned the ball over on downs on their ensuing drive, but WKU was unable to capitalize as kicker Skyler Simcox missed a 45-yard field goal, the second missed FG of the game. Memphis then got the ball back, but fumbled on the very next play to give the Hilltoppers possession on the Tigers' 21. Unlike the last, Western Kentucky capitalized on this turnover, and scored in three plays to extend their lead to 24 after the PAT was missed. With 6:18 left in the 3rd, WKU came close to losing another of their defenders (Juwan Gardner) to another targeting call, though this one was overturned. Memphis scored a touchdown on the next play, cutting the lead down to 17. Western Kentucky opened their next drive with a 38-yard pass on a flea flicker and a 32-yard rush, but then stalled on the 4-yard line and settled for a 21-yard field goal, extending the lead to 20. With 2:14 left in the 3rd, Memphis lost offensive lineman Trevon Tate after he received his second unsportsmanlike conduct penalty of the game. Clearly shaken, Tigers QB Riley Ferguson threw an interception on the next play, and WKU took over on the Memphis 30; Ferguson was injured on the play. WKU stalled on their ensuing drive, and the third quarter ended 44–24, Western Kentucky. Memphis's first drive of the fourth quarter resulted in a turnover on downs (their second of the game), and WKU took over on their own 29. Western Kentucky punted, and, on 4th & 12 of their next drive, Memphis threw a 45-yard touchdown pass to pull within 13. Western Kentucky added to their lead with just over two minutes to go in the game as Player of the Game Anthony Wales found the end zone from 1 yard out. There was no more scoring in the game, and Western Kentucky became the 2016 Boca Raton Bowl champions, 51–31.

=== Scoring summary ===
Scoring summary

Quarter	Time	Drive			Team	Scoring information	Score	
Quarter	Time	Plays	Yards	TOP	Team	Scoring information	MEM	WKU
1	10:43	5	65	1:23	MEM	Tony Pollard 45-yard touchdown reception from Riley Ferguson, Jake Elliott kick good	7	0
1	7:42	8	75	3:01	WKU	Stevie Donatell 4-yard touchdown reception from Mike White, Skyler Simcox kick good	7	7
1	5:38	9	59	2:04	MEM	33-yard field goal by Jake Elliott	10	7
1	1:47	8	78	3:51	WKU	Forrest Lamp 9-yard touchdown run, Skyler Simcox kick good	10	14
2	11:59	6	74	2:13	WKU	Nicholas Norris 37-yard touchdown reception from Mike White, Skylar Simcox kick good	10	21
2	10:02	8	75	2:59	MEM	Anthony Miller 7-yard touchdown reception from Riley Ferguson, Jake Elliott kick good	17	21
2	2:16	13	71	6:44	WKU	Anthony Wales 2-yard touchdown run, Skyler Simcox kick good	17	28
3	13:24	4	75	1:36	WKU	Taywan Taylor 41-yard touchdown reception from Mike White, Skyler Simcox kick good	17	35
3	7:31	3	21	1:23	WKU	Anthony Wales 3-yard touchdown run, Skyler Simcox kick no good (miss left)	17	41
3	5:34	6	75	1:57	MEM	Anthony Miller 10-yard touchdown reception from Riley Ferguson, Jake Elliott kick good	24	41
3	3:34	6	71	2:00	WKU	21-yard field goal by Skyler Simcox	24	44
4	8:47	6	72	1:37	MEM	Anthony Miller 45-yard touchdown reception from Riley Ferguson, Jake Elliott kick good	31	44
4	2:18	11	75	6:29	WKU	Anthony Wales 1-yard touchdown run, Skyler Simcox kick good	31	51
"TOP" = time of possession. For other American football terms, see Glossary of American football.							31	51

=== Statistics ===
Statistics	MEM	WKU
First downs	27	28
Plays-yards	81–491	78–598
Third down efficiency	4–14	4–10
Rushes-yards	32–73	48–262
Passing yards	418	336
Passing, Comp-Att-Int	27–49–1	20–30–1
Time of Possession	23:22	36:04

Team	Category	Player	Statistics
MEM	Passing	Riley Ferguson	25/43, 372 yds, 4 TD, 1 INT
MEM	Rushing	Patrick Taylor	3 car, 34 yds
MEM	Receiving	Anthony Miller	11 rec, 151 yds, 3 TD
WKU	Passing	Mike White	20/30, 336 yds, 3 TD, 1 INT
WKU	Rushing	Anthony Wales	35 car, 245 yds, 3 TD
WKU	Receiving	Taywan Taylor	9 rec, 144 yds, 1 TD
