= Curtis Steele =

American gridiron football player (born 1987)

No. 2
- Position: Running back

Personal information
- Born: March 24, 1987 (age 39); Franklin, Tennessee, U.S.
- Listed height: 6 ft 0 in (1.83 m)
- Listed weight: 190 lb (86 kg)

Career information
- High school: Franklin (TN) Centennial
- College: Memphis
- NFL draft: 2010: undrafted

Career history
- Baltimore Ravens (2010)*; Toronto Argonauts (2013–2015); Saskatchewan Roughriders (2016)
- * Offseason or practice squad member only

Awards and highlights
- C–USA Newcomer of the Year (2008); First-team All-C-USA (2009); Second-team All-C–USA (2008)
- Stats at Pro Football Reference

Curtis Devon Steele (born March 24, 1987) is an American former professional football running back. He was a member of the Saskatchewan Roughriders of the Canadian Football League (CFL). He has also played for the Toronto Argonauts and Baltimore Ravens.

== College career ==
From 2005-2006, Steele attended Northwest Mississippi Community College and played on the Northwest Rangers football team.

In 2007, Steele transferred to the University of Memphis and was redshirted.

In 2008, Steele immediately became the team's starter. He started 12 of 13 games and was named Offensive Player of the Year at the team banquet following the season.

In 2009, he started 9 of the 10 games he played in and was selected the team Offensive Player of the Year as well as one of three permanent captains. He ran for 1,239 yards and 15 touchdowns.

In two years with Memphis, Steele ran for 2,462 yards and 22 touchdowns, good for third all time in team history.

== Professional career ==
=== Baltimore Ravens ===
On May 7, 2010, Steele was signed a practice roster agreement with the Baltimore Ravens, and started the season on their practice roster. Steele attended the Ravens 2011 training camp and was released by the Ravens on July 29.

=== Toronto Argonauts ===
On May 2, 2013, Steele was signed by the Toronto Argonauts of the Canadian Football League. Steele made his first CFL start on July 30, 2013. In his first season in the CFL Steele played in 7 games for the Argos and carried the ball for 187 yards on 39 rushing attempts (4.8 yards per carry) with 3 rushing touchdowns. In the 2014 CFL season played in 15 of the 18 regular season games, carrying the ball 87 times for 541 yards (6.2 yards per carry) with 4 touchdowns. He also added 309 receiving yards on 35 receptions (8.8 yards per reception) and a lone receiving TD. One day after the free-agency period opened Steele re-signed with the Argonauts.

=== Saskatchewan Roughriders ===
Steele signed with the Saskatchewan Roughriders on February 10, 2016. Steele missed 11 games with an injury but still collected 54 carries for 314 yards and caught 16 passes for 138 yards. On January 27, 2017, about two weeks before becoming a free agent, Steele was released by the Riders along with three of his teammates.
