= Anthony Miller (wide receiver, born 1994) =

American football player (born 1994)

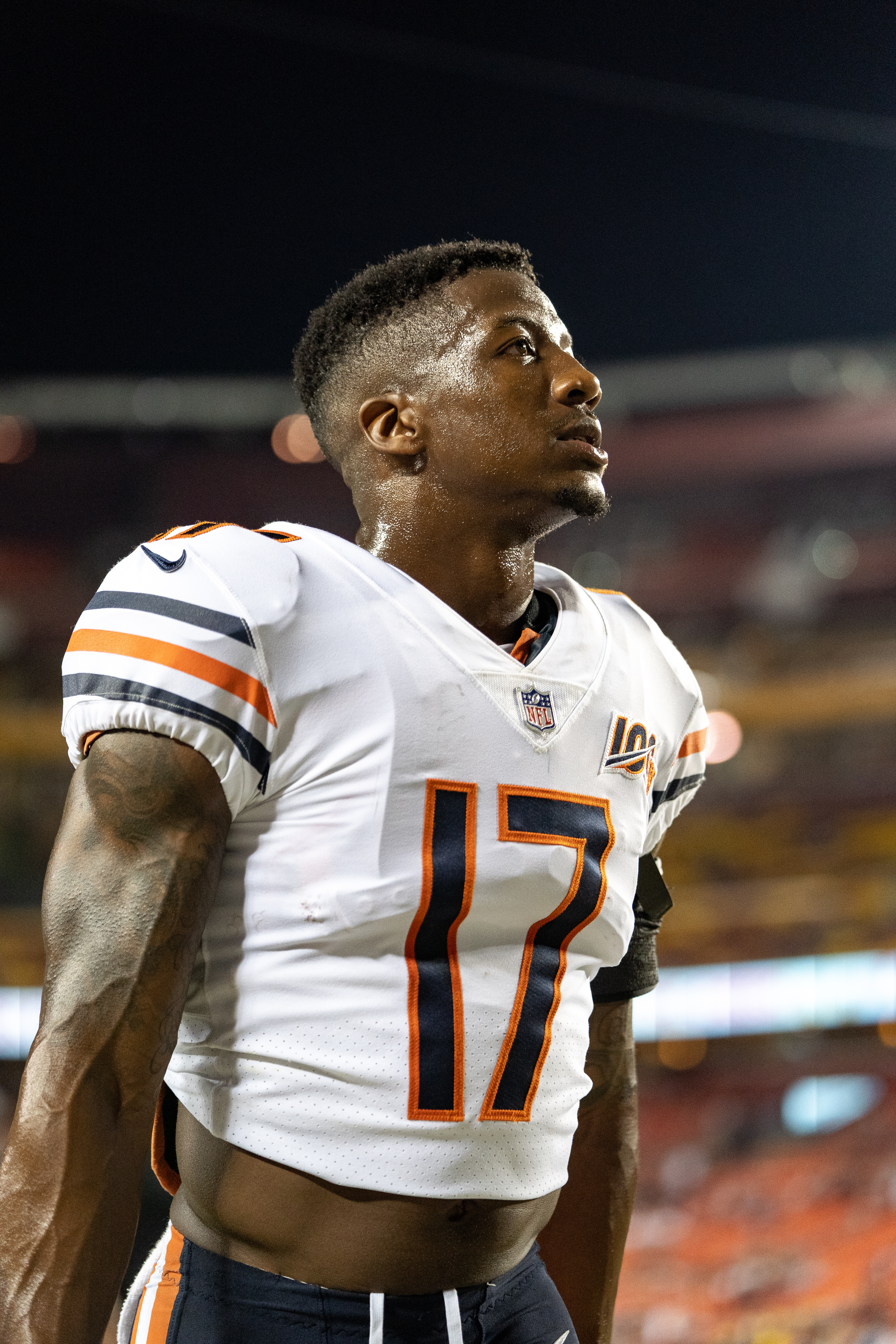
- Miller with the Chicago Bears in 2019

Profile
- Position: Wide receiver

Personal information
- Born: October 9, 1994 (age 32); Memphis, Tennessee, U.S.
- Listed height: 5 ft 11 in (1.80 m)
- Listed weight: 195 lb (88 kg)

Career information
- High school: Christian Brothers (Memphis)
- College: Memphis (2013–2017)
- NFL draft: 2018: 2nd round, 51st overall pick

Career history
- Chicago Bears (2018–2020); Houston Texans (2021); Pittsburgh Steelers (2021–2022); San Francisco 49ers (2023)*; Indianapolis Colts (2023)*; Kansas City Chiefs (2024)*; Baltimore Ravens (2024–2025)
- * Offseason or practice squad member only

Awards and highlights
- Paul Warfield Trophy (2017); Consensus All-American (2017); First-team All-AAC (2017); Second-team All-AAC (2016)

Career NFL statistics as of 2024
- Receptions: 140
- Receiving yards: 1,589
- Receiving touchdowns: 12
- Stats at Pro Football Reference

Anthony Miller (born October 9, 1994) is an American professional football wide receiver. He played college football for the Memphis Tigers.

== Early life ==
Miller attended Christian Brothers High School in Memphis, Tennessee, where he played football and ran track for the Purple Wave athletic teams.

== College career ==
Miller joined the University of Memphis football team as a walk-on. He redshirted in 2013 and then again in 2014 due to an injury. In 2015, he played in 12 games and made four starts, recording 47 receptions for 694 yards with five receiving touchdowns and two rushing touchdowns. In 2016, Miller started all 13 games and set school records with 95 receptions for 1,434 yards and 14 touchdowns. During his senior season in 2017, he broke Duke Calhoun's school records for career receptions and receiving yards, Carlos Singleton's school record for career receiving touchdowns, and his own outright record for single-season receiving touchdowns and shared record for single-game receiving touchdowns.

=== Collegiate statistics ===
Year	School	Conf	Class	Pos	G	Receiving				Rushing			
Year	School	Conf	Class	Pos	G	Rec	Yds	Avg	TD	Att	Yds	Avg	TD
2015	Memphis	American	SO	WR	12	47	694	14.8	5	9	54	6.0	2
2016	Memphis	American	JR	WR	13	95	1,434	15.1	14	12	69	5.8	1
2017	Memphis	American	SR	WR	13	96	1,462	15.2	18	10	25	2.5	0
Career	Memphis					238	3,590	15.1	37	31	148	4.8	3

== Professional career ==
Pre-draft measurables
Height	Weight	Arm length	Hand span	Wingspan	40-yard dash	10-yard split	20-yard split	20-yard shuttle	Three-cone drill	Vertical jump	Broad jump	Bench press
5 ft 11 1/8 in (1.81 m)	201 lb (91 kg)	31 5/8 in (0.80 m)	10 5/8 in (0.27 m)	6 ft 3 1/2 in (1.92 m)	4.50 s	1.57 s	2.59 s	4.26 s	6.65 s	39.0 in (0.99 m)	10 ft 5 in (3.18 m)	22 reps
All values from NFL Combine/Pro Day

=== Chicago Bears ===
==== 2018 ====
Miller was selected by the Chicago Bears in the second round, 51st overall, of the 2018 NFL draft. He was the sixth wide receiver to be selected that year.

In his NFL debut against the Green Bay Packers in the season opener, he had two receptions for 14 yards in the 24–23 defeat. In the following game, a 24–17 victory over the Seattle Seahawks, he recorded his first professional touchdown reception. The third game of the year against the Arizona Cardinals saw Miller catch four passes for 35 yards, but he left the game early with a dislocated shoulder.

On October 14, caught a 29-yard touchdown pass against the Miami Dolphins, his second of the season, in the 31–28 overtime loss. Two weeks later, Miller caught three passes for 37 yards and a touchdown, his third of the season, against the New York Jets. In Week 10 against the Detroit Lions, Miller caught five passes for 122 yards and a touchdown. The Bears won the game by a score of 34–22.

In Week 13 against the New York Giants, Miller caught the game-tying touchdown pass in regulation on a trick play: quarterback Chase Daniel tossed the ball to tight end Trey Burton, who then tossed it to running back Tarik Cohen, who threw it to Miller for the touchdown. Miller's touchdown sent the game into overtime, tied 27–27. Unfortunately, the Bears lost to the Giants in overtime 30–27 after the Bears failed to convert a fourth down in overtime.

In Week 16 against the San Francisco 49ers, Miller was ejected after he got in a fight with safety Marcell Harris. Miller attacked Harris after he hit quarterback Mitchell Trubisky as he was sliding to the ground. In addition, fellow Bears wide receiver Josh Bellamy and 49ers cornerback Richard Sherman were ejected from the game. Before he was ejected, he had three catches for 24 yards and a touchdown. The Bears won the game 14–9.

Miller finished his rookie season with 33 catches for 423 yards and seven touchdowns. His seven touchdowns led the team and were the most by a Bears rookie since Willie Gault had seven in 1983; he also ranked second in the league among rookie receivers behind the Atlanta Falcons' Calvin Ridley. He received an overall grade of 60.6 from Pro Football Focus in 2018, which ranked as the 92nd-highest grade among all qualifying wide receivers.

==== 2019 ====
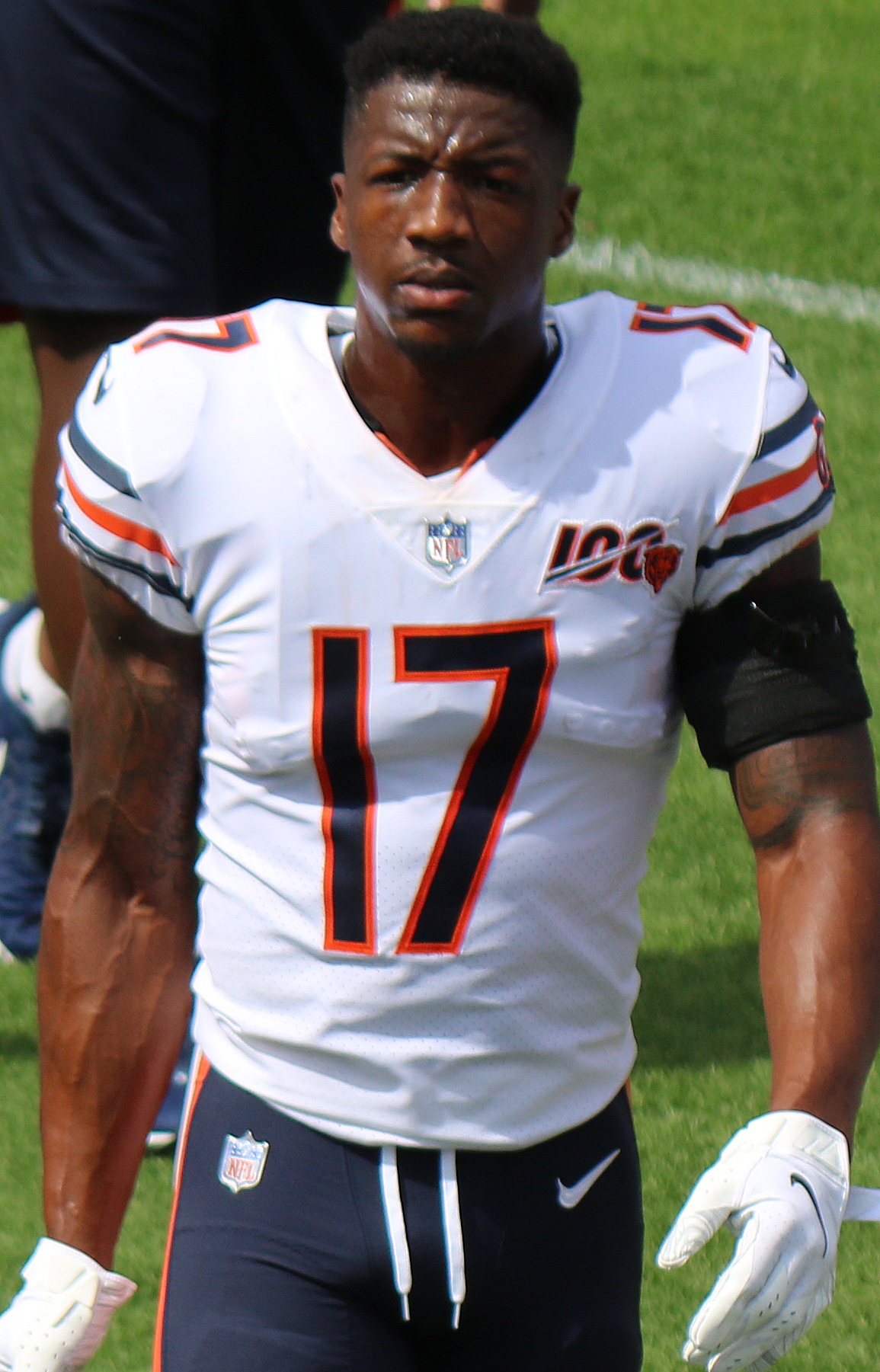
Miller in the 2019 NFL season

Against the Lions in Week 13, Miller finished with a career-high nine catches for 140 receiving yards as the Bears won 24–20. In the following week's game against the Dallas Cowboys, Miller caught three passes for 42 yards and his first touchdown of the season in the 31–24 win. In Week 15 against the Packers, Miller caught nine passes for 118 yards and a touchdown during the 21–13 loss. Overall, Miller finished the 2019 season with 52 receptions for 656 receiving yards and two receiving touchdowns.

==== 2020 ====
In the 2020 season opener against the Lions, Miller scored the go-ahead touchdown with 1:55 remaining on a 27-yard reception from Trubisky; Miller's assignment, a fly route from the right slot receiver position, was the same pattern he ran in the 2019 Thanksgiving game that resulted in a 32-yard catch. Miller ended the 27–23 victory with four catches for 76 yards. In Week 3 against the Atlanta Falcons, Miller caught a 28-yard touchdown pass late in the fourth quarter to help the Bears come back to win the game 30–26. He finished the 2020 season with 49 receptions for 485 receiving yards and two receiving touchdowns. Miller was ejected from the Wild Card Round of the 2020–21 NFL playoffs for hitting New Orleans Saints cornerback C. J. Gardner-Johnson. Miller caught two passes for 22 yards prior to being disqualified from the game.

=== Houston Texans ===
On July 26, 2021, Miller was traded to the Houston Texans along with a 2022 seventh-round pick for a 2022 fifth-round pick. He scored his first touchdown as a Texan in Week 3 against the Panthers. He played in two games before being released on October 6, 2021.

=== Pittsburgh Steelers ===
On October 12, 2021, Miller was signed to the practice squad of the Pittsburgh Steelers. He was elevated to the active roster from the practice squad on November 27, 2021. He signed a reserve/future contract with the Steelers on January 24, 2022.

On August 16, 2022, Miller was placed on injured reserve with a season-ending shoulder injury.

On January 17, 2023, Miller signed a one-year contract extension with the Steelers. He was released on June 20, 2023.

=== San Francisco 49ers ===
On August 22, 2023, Miller signed with the 49ers. He was released on August 29, 2023.

=== Indianapolis Colts ===
On October 11, 2023, the Indianapolis Colts signed Miller to their practice squad. He was released on October 17, 2023.

=== Kansas City Chiefs ===
On January 23, 2024, Miller signed a reserve/future contract with the Kansas City Chiefs. He was released on May 3, 2024.

=== Baltimore Ravens ===
On August 11, 2024, Miller signed with the Baltimore Ravens. He was released on August 27, and re-signed to the practice squad. In Week 17 against the Texans, he had his first catch since the 2021 season. Miller was elevated to the active roster for the Ravens' playoff game against the Buffalo Bills, a 27–25 loss. He signed a reserve/future contract on January 21, 2025.

On August 26, 2025, Miller was released by the Ravens as part of final roster cuts and re-signed to the practice squad the next day. He was released on September 24.

== Career statistics ==
Legend
**Bold**	Career high

Season	Team	Games		Receiving					Rushing				
Season	Team	GP	GS	Rec	Yds	Avg	Lng	TD	Att	Yds	Avg	Lng	TD
2018	CHI	15	4	33	423	12.8	**55**	**7**	**6**	**26**	**4.3**	**9**	0
2019	CHI	**16**	**7**	**52**	**656**	12.6	35	2	1	−1	−1.0	−1	0
2020	CHI	**16**	6	49	485	9.9	34	2	2	12	6.0	**9**	0
2021	HOU	2	1	5	23	4.6	10	1	0	0	0	0	0
2021	PIT	1	0	1	2	2.0	2	0	0	0	0	0	0
2024	BAL	2	0	1	16	**16.0**	16	0	0	0	0	0	0
Total		52	18	141	1,605	11.4	55	12	9	37	4.1	9	0
Playoffs
2018	CHI	1	0	3	**34**	**11.3**	**23**	0	0	0	0.0	0	0
2020	CHI	1	**1**	2	22	11.0	11	0	**1**	**2**	**2.0**	**2**	0
2024	BAL	**2**	0	**4**	28	7.0	16	0	0	0	0	0	0
Total		4	1	9	84	9.3	23	0	1	2	2.0	2	0
