= Lloyd Patterson =

American gridiron football player (born 1957)

No. 10
- Position: Quarterback

Personal information
- Born: March 26, 1957 (age 69)
- Listed height: 5 ft 11 in (1.80 m)
- Listed weight: 175 lb (79 kg)

Career information
- High school: Hamilton (Memphis, Tennessee)
- College: Memphis State (1975–1978)

Career history
- Saskatchewan Roughriders (1979)

Lloyd Patterson (born March 26, 1957) is an American former professional football quarterback who played one season with the Saskatchewan Roughriders of the Canadian Football League (CFL). He played college football at Memphis State University.

== Early life and college ==
Lloyd Patterson was born on March 26, 1957. He attended Hamilton High School in Memphis, Tennessee.

Patterson was a four-year letterman for the Memphis State Tigers of Memphis State University from 1975 to 1978. He completed 30 of 72 passes (41.7%) for 371 yards and seven interceptions as a true freshman in 1975 while also rushing for 168 yards and five touchdowns. In 1976, he recorded 87 completions on 178 passing attempts (48.9%) for 1,563 yards, 14 touchdowns, and six interceptions, and 103 rushing yards for seven touchdowns. His 8.8 yards per attempt was the highest among independents that year. Patterson completed 73 of 169 passes (43.2%) for 1,336 yards, nine touchdowns, and eight interceptions during the 1977 season while rushing for 138 yards and three touchdowns. As a senior in 1978, he totaled 56 completions on 141 attempts (39.7%) for 931 yards, seven touchdowns, 13 interceptions, and four rushing touchdowns. He was inducted into the school's M Club Hall of Fame in 1996.

== Professional career ==
Patterson played in nine games for the Saskatchewan Roughriders of the Canadian Football League in 1979, completing 40 of 113 passes (35.4%) for 533 yards, one touchdown, and 12 interceptions while also rushing for 109 yards and one touchdown.

== Personal life ==
Patterson later started his own business, called J-Jireh Laundry and Cleaners, in Memphis. His son Lloyd also played for the Memphis Tigers.
