= Journey Brown =

American football player (born 1999)

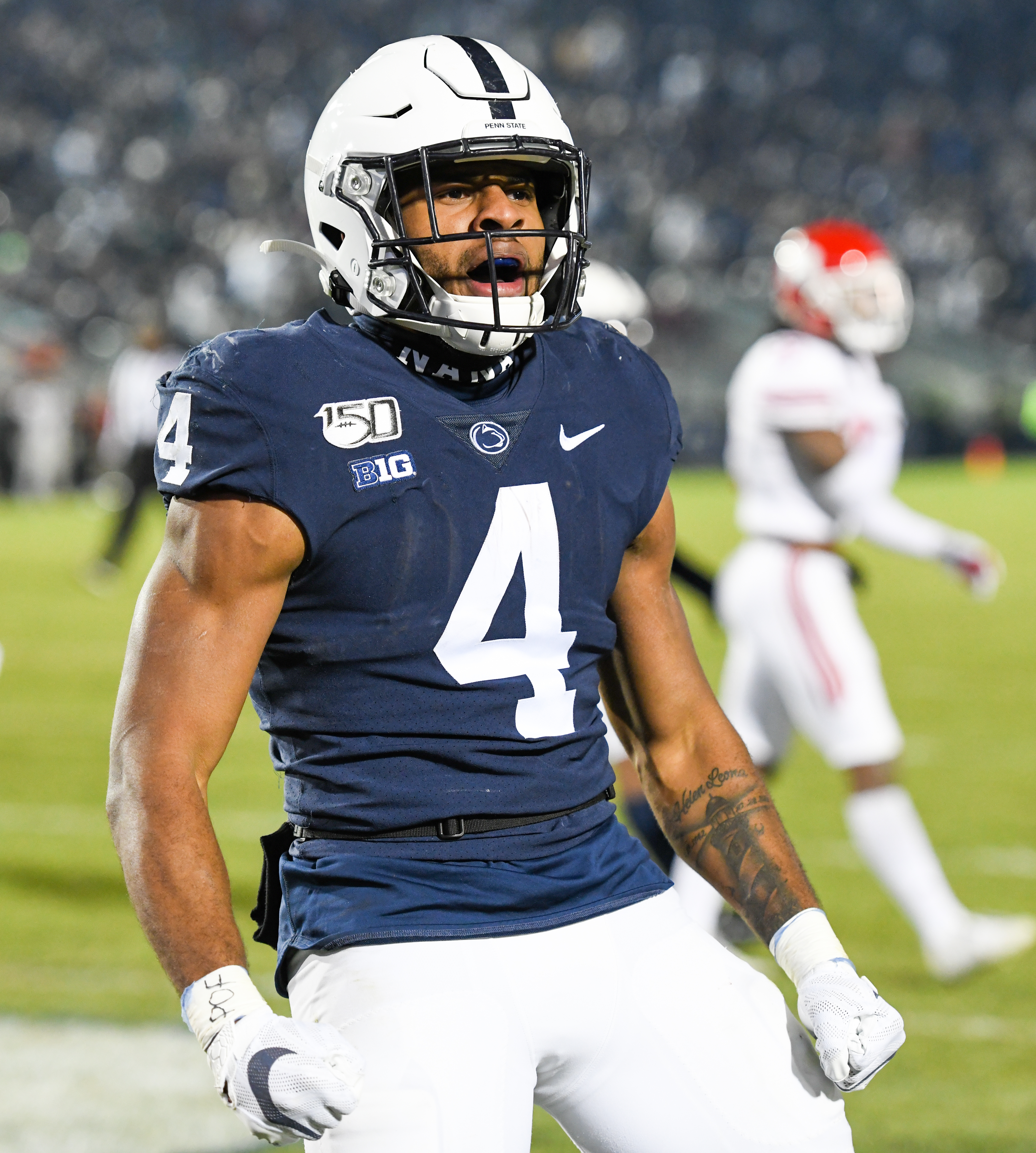
- Brown in 2019

No. 4
- Position: Running back

Personal information
- Born: March 19, 1999 (age 27); Meadville, Pennsylvania, U.S.
- Listed height: 5 ft 11 in (1.80 m)
- Listed weight: 216 lb (98 kg)

Career information
- High school: Meadville (Meadville, Pennsylvania)
- College: Penn State (2017–2020)

Journey Jay Brown (born March 19, 1999) is an American stock car racing pit crew member and former football running back. He played college football for the Penn State Nittany Lions.

Following his football career, he became a NASCAR Cup Series tire changer for Trackhouse Racing.

== Early life ==
Brown attended Meadville Area Senior High School in Meadville, Pennsylvania. During his career, he rushed for 7,027 yards and 106 touchdowns. During a game his junior year in 2015, he broke Pennsylvania high school records for rushing yards in a game with 722 and rushing touchdowns with 10. He committed to Penn State University to play college football. Brown also ran track in high school and broke the Pennsylvania record for 100 meter dash which was held by Olympian Leroy Burrell.

== College career ==
After redshirting his first year at Penn State in 2017, Brown played in eight games in 2018 and had 44 yards on eight carries with a touchdown. As a redshirt sophomore in 2019, he started 10 of 13 games, rushing for 890 yards on 129 carries and 12 touchdowns. He was named the MVP of the 2019 Cotton Bowl after rushing for a school bowl game record 202 yards.

On November 11, 2020, PSU head coach James Franklin announced Brown could no longer play football due to hypertrophic cardiomyopathy.

== NASCAR ==
In 2023, Brown was hired by Trackhouse Racing as a tire changer. Brown had little familiarity with NASCAR prior to his recruitment, but his footwork and athleticism as a running back were viewed by the team as commodities for pitting. The occupation is also intense but short enough that he could work at full strength while managing his hypertrophic cardiomyopathy with medication.

Brown made his pitting debut at the 2023 Coke Zero Sugar 400, where he changed tires on Justin Haley's No. 31 car for Trackhouse client Kaulig Racing. In 2024, he became the front tire changer for Zane Smith and the No. 71 of Spire Motorsports.

== Personal life ==
Brown has a daughter Aleigha.
