= Danny Wimprine =

American gridiron football player (born 1981)

No. 18
- Position: Quarterback

Personal information
- Born: August 6, 1981 (age 45)

Career information
- High school: John Curtis Christian (River Ridge, Louisiana)
- College: Memphis
- NFL draft: 2005: undrafted

Career history
- Cleveland Browns (2005)*; Calgary Stampeders (2005); New Orleans VooDoo (2008, 2011)
- * Offseason or practice squad member only

Career CFL statistics
- Completions: 19
- Attempts: 46
- Yards: 270
- Touchdowns: 2
- Interceptions: 3

Career AFL statistics
- Completions: 552
- Attempts: 939
- Yards: 6,557
- Touchdowns: 131
- Interceptions: 28
- Stats at ArenaFan.com

Daniel Wimprine (born August 6, 1981) is an American former professional football player who was a quarterback in the Canadian Football League (CFL) and Arena Football League (AFL). He played college football for the Memphis Tigers.

== College career ==
Wimprine was a four-year starter at quarterback at the University of Memphis. He left the Tigers as the all-time leader in most major passing categories. Owns Tiger records for career completions (808), pass attempts (1,469), yards (10,215), touchdown passes (85), touchdowns responsible for (99) and interceptions (49). Tossed for over 300 yards eight times in his career, which still stands as the most 300-yard games in Tiger history. Had 22 games of 200 yards or more, also No. 1 in the Memphis record books. Started 42 of the 46 games that he played in, where he was 21–25 as a starter. Still remains in the Top 100 for most yards in NCAA History. His first career start came against the University of Houston in 2001, where he defeated the Cougars 52–33. He finished that game by completing 14-of-21 passes for 216 yards and two touchdowns, while also carrying 15 times for 85 yards and a score. He went on to guide the Tigers to back-to-back eight win seasons as a junior and senior. Won the 2003 New Orleans Bowl, defeating the University of North Texas 27–17. Lost the 2004 GMAC Bowl to Bowling Green State University, 52–35. As a senior in 2004, was named All-Conference USA second-team, completing 199 of 359 passes for 2,568 yards and 18 TDs, while rushing for two more.

== Professional career ==
After the 2005 NFL draft, the Cleveland Browns signed Wimprine to a one-year deal. He was able to go to camp with the Browns and compete for a spot behind Trent Dilfer, with Charlie Frye and Josh Harris.

Following his release by the Browns, Wimprine quickly signed with the Calgary Stampeders of the Canadian Football League. He completed 19 of 46 passes, for 270 yards, with two touchdowns and three interceptions.

In 2008, Wimprined signed with the New Orleans VooDoo. He had not played organized football since 2005, and considered himself lucky to have an opportunity to play again. Wimprine went on to have tremendous success with the VooDoo in 2008, where he threw for 85 touchdowns, and only 11 interceptions. After the season, the AFL folded, and Wimprine went back to his life working the family business. In 2011, after the AFL was able to restructure itself, Wimprine once again signed up to be the quarterback for the VooDoo. After a decent return to the VooDoo, Wimprine retired in November after he and his wife Ashley Wimprine had their first child.

== See also ==
- List of Division I FBS passing yardage leaders
