= Carlos Singleton =

American football player (born 1987)

No. 5
- Position: Wide receiver

Personal information
- Born: February 15, 1987 (age 39); Brownsville, Tennessee, U.S.
- Listed height: 6 ft 7 in (2.01 m)
- Listed weight: 225 lb (102 kg)

Career information
- High school: Haywood (Brownsville)
- College: Memphis
- NFL draft: 2010: undrafted

Career history
- Cincinnati Bengals (2010)*; Jacksonville Sharks (2011); Colorado Ice (2011); Florida Tarpons (2012–2016); Tampa Bay Storm (2012–2013)*
- * Offseason or practice squad member only

Awards and highlights
- UIFL champion (2013); X-League champion (2015)

Career AFL statistics
- Receptions: 4
- Receiving yards: 42
- Receiving TDs: 1
- Tackles: 1
- Stats at ArenaFan.com

Carlos Patrick Singleton (born February 15, 1987) is an American former football wide receiver. He played as a wide receiver for the University of Memphis. He was signed as an undrafted free agent by the Cincinnati Bengals in 2010.
