= Damonte Coxie =

American gridiron football player (born 1996)

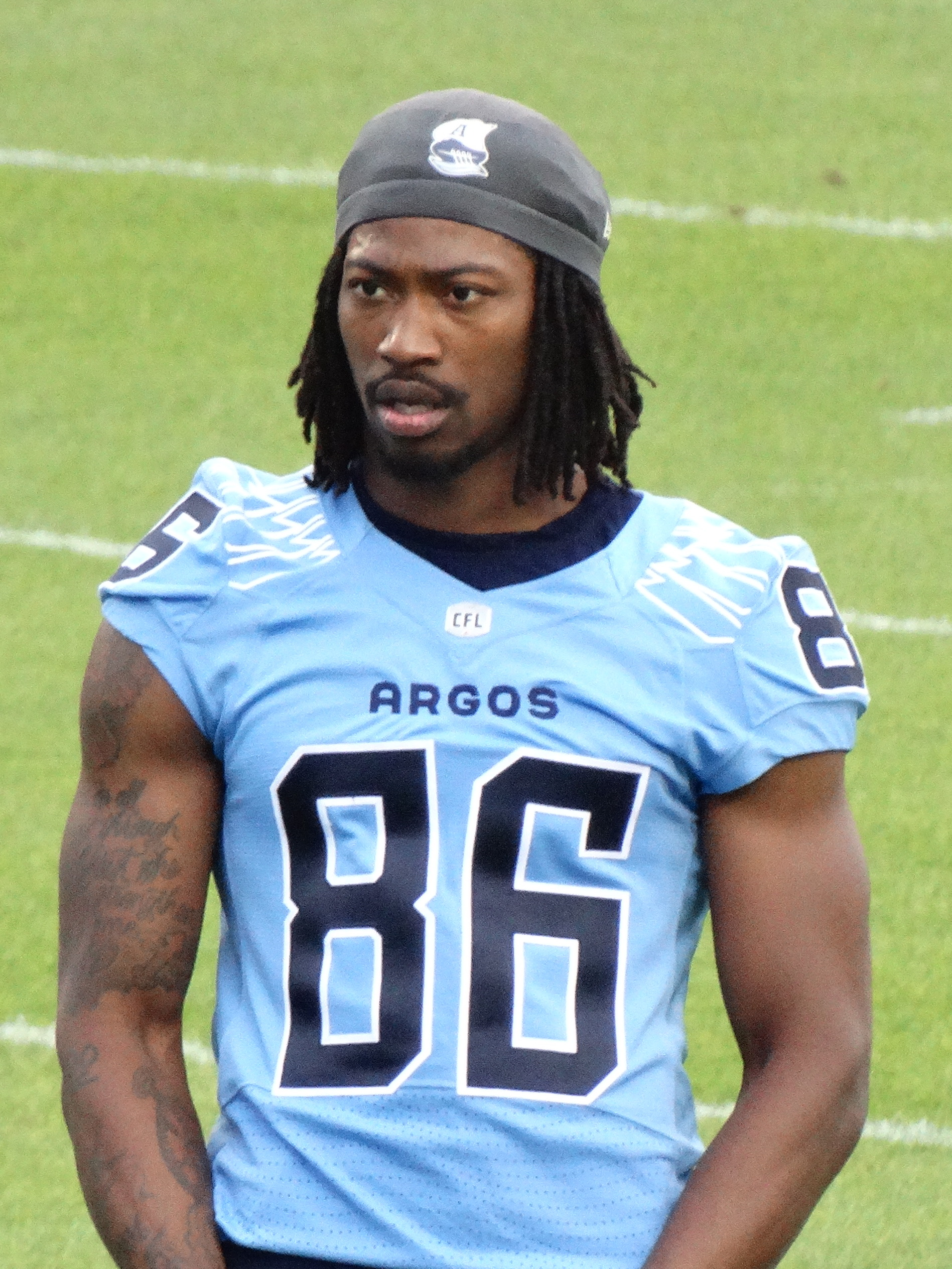
- Coxie with the Toronto Argonauts in 2024

No. 86 – Toronto Argonauts
- Position: Wide receiver
- Roster status: Active
- CFL status: American

Personal information
- Born: November 28, 1996 (age 29); Reserve, Louisiana, U.S.
- Listed height: 6 ft 3 in (1.91 m)
- Listed weight: 200 lb (91 kg)

Career information
- High school: East St. John High; Tara High
- College: Memphis

Career history
- 2022–present: Toronto Argonauts

Awards and highlights
- 2× Grey Cup champion (2022, 2024); 2x CFL East All-Star (2023, 2026)
- Stats at Pro Football Reference
- Stats at CFL.ca

Damonte Coxie (born November 28, 1996) is an American professional football wide receiver for the Toronto Argonauts of the Canadian Football League (CFL). He is a two-time Grey Cup champion after winning with Argonauts in 2022 and 2024. He played college football for the Memphis Tigers.

== College career ==
After using a redshirt season in 2016, Coxie played college football at the University of Memphis from 2017 to 2020. He played in 43 games where he had 185 receptions for 2,948 yards and 20 touchdowns for the Tigers.

Bold indicates career high
Year	Team	Receiving				
Year	Team	Games	Rec	Yds	Avg	TD
2017	Memphis	13	21	323	15.4	3
2018	Memphis	**14**	72	1,174	16.3	7
2019	Memphis	**14**	**76**	**1,276**	**16.8**	**9**
2020	Memphis	2	16	175	10.9	1
**Career**		**43**	**185**	**2948**	**15.9**	**20**

== Professional career ==
Pre-draft measurables
Height	Weight	Arm length	Hand span	Wingspan	40-yard dash	10-yard split	20-yard split	20-yard shuttle	Three-cone drill	Vertical jump	Broad jump	Bench press
6 ft 2 1/8 in (1.88 m)	198 lb (90 kg)	33 1/4 in (0.84 m)	8 3/4 in (0.22 m)	6 ft 9 in (2.06 m)	4.77 s	1.68 s	2.74 s	4.45 s	6.92 s	30.5 in (0.77 m)	10 ft 2 in (3.10 m)	4 reps
All values from Pro Day

After going undrafted in the 2021 NFL draft, Coxie had a tryout with the Green Bay Packers, but was not signed.

Following a year in which he did not play football, Coxie was signed by the Toronto Argonauts on January 24, 2022. He spent training camp with the team in 2022 and was added to the team's practice roster prior to the start of the regular season. After the team's receiving corps was beset by injuries, Coxie made his professional debut on July 31, 2022, against the Ottawa Redblacks. He made his first career reception in his second game, on August 20, 2022, against the Calgary Stampeders. He finished the 2022 season having played in seven regular season games, starting in six, where he had 15 catches for 210 yards. He ended the season on the six-game injured list and was there when the Argonauts won the 109th Grey Cup.

In 2023, Coxie became a regular starter and played in 14 regular season games where he had 39 receptions for 787 yards and five touchdowns. For his breakout season, he was named a CFL East All-Star. He also played in the team's East Final loss to the Montreal Alouettes where he had one catch for 29 yards.

In the 2024 season, Coxie played and started in 17 regular season games where he had 59 receptions for 860 yards and four touchdowns. He sat out the East-Semi Final due to injury, but played in the next two post-season games, including the 111th Grey Cup where he had three receptions for 29 yards in the Argonauts' 41–24 victory over the Winnipeg Blue Bombers.

== Personal life ==
Coxie was born to parents Monte Weathers and Donald Coxie. His father, Donald, was killed in a car accident when Coxie was seven years old.
