= Joe Allison (American football) =

American gridiron football player (born 1970)

No. 28
- Position: Kicker

Personal information
- Born: January 20, 1970 (age 56); Miami, Florida, U.S.
- Listed height: 6 ft 0 in (1.83 m)
- Listed weight: 200 lb (91 kg)

Career information
- High school: American (Miami, Florida)
- College: Memphis State (1990–1993)
- NFL draft: 1994: undrafted

Career history
- 1994: Tampa Bay Buccaneers*
- 1995: Memphis Mad Dogs
- * Offseason or practice squad member only

Awards and highlights
- Consensus All-American (1992).; All-Independent 1st team (1993); Lou Groza Award (1992); Tennessee Sports Hall of Fame

Career CFL statistics
- Field goals made: 1
- Field goals attempted: 3
- Singles: 2

Joe Allison (born January 20, 1970) is an American former football placekicker. He played one game in 1995 the Canadian Football League (CFL) for the Memphis Mad Dogs, a short-lived expansion team. He played college football for the Memphis State Tigers, where he won the inaugural Lou Groza Award in 1992.

== Early life ==
Allison attended high school at American High School. Although he starred at his school as a quarterback, punter and placekicker, the only Division I school that offered him a scholarship was the University of Memphis—then known as Memphis State University. Allison chose to accept the scholarship and attend Memphis State.

== College career ==
Allison played college football for the Memphis State Tigers from 1990 to 1993. In 1992, his junior season at the school, Allison won the Lou Groza Award, awarded to the nation's top placekicker. During the season, Allison made 23 out of 25 field goals, and led the NCAA in both field goals made as well as field goal percentage, where he achieved 92 percent. He also connected on all 32 extra points that he attempted. For the 1992 season, Allison scored a total of 101 points. Allison was also named to the first-team All-American team, the first Memphis State University player in the school's history to be honored with that recognition.

He was inducted into the Tennessee Sports Hall of Fame in 2018.

== Professional career ==
Allison signed with the Tampa Bay Buccaneers of the National Football League (NFL), but he did not make the roster.

Allison played a single regular season game for the Memphis Mad Dogs of the Canadian Football League, in which he completed six kick-offs, scored one field goal on three attempts, and made two singles.

== Personal life ==
Joe Allison's first cousin was Davey Allison, who was a NASCAR race car driver for Robert Yates Racing. Davey was killed in a helicopter accident in 1993. Joe was the godfather to Davey's daughter Krista. Joe and Davey were very close, and after his death, Joe said "Before I go in to kick, I put my hat down and say, 'Davey, give me the strength to do the best I can, to be as strong as you were.'"
