= Mighty Sound of the South =

Marching band at the University of Memphis

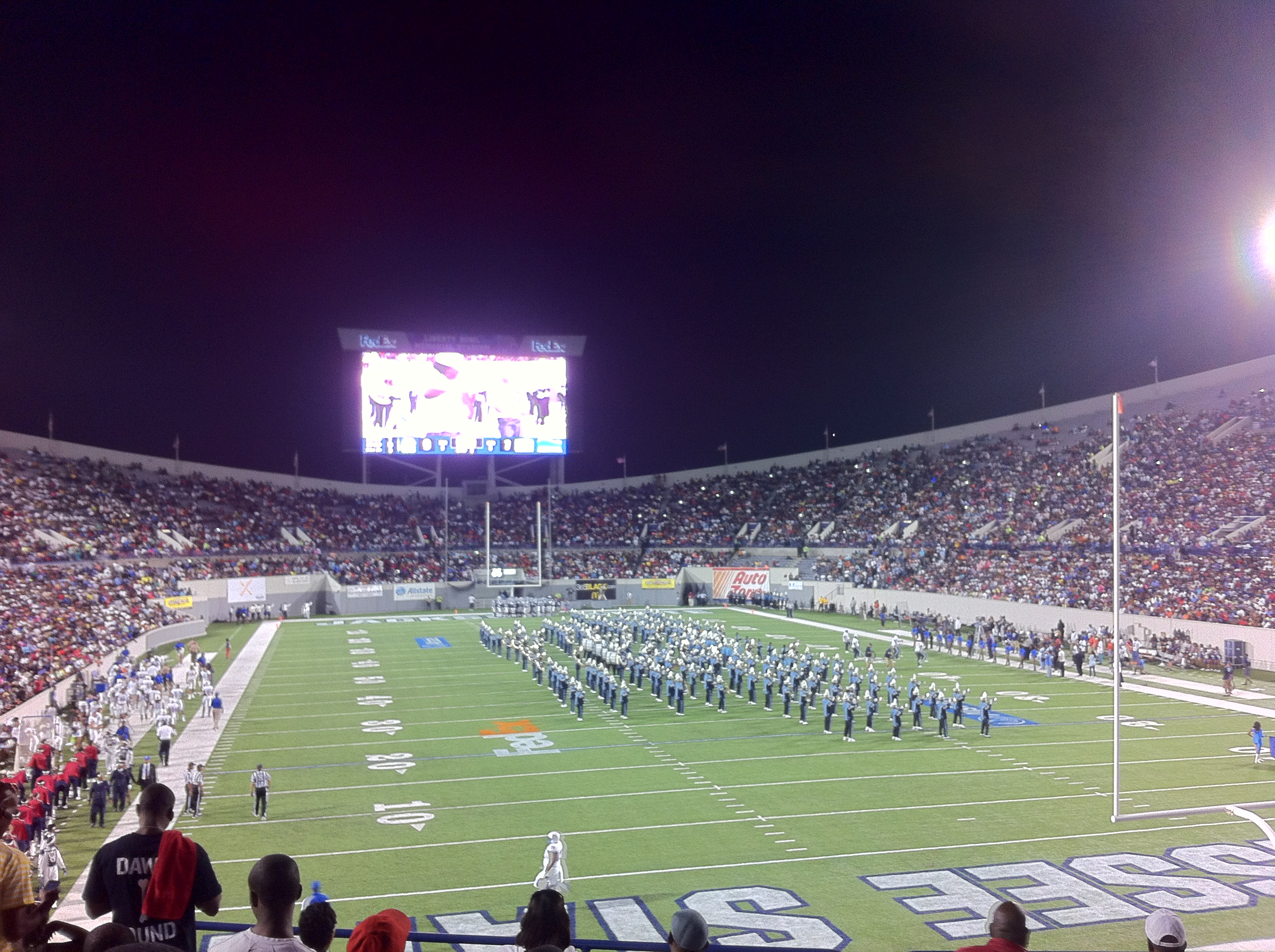
- Mighty Sound of the South at the 2013 Southern Heritage Classic
- School: University of Memphis
- Location: Memphis, Tennessee
- Conference: AAC
- Founded: 1940
- Director: Albert Nguyen
- Associate Director: William Plenk
- Assistant Director: Wilker Augusto
- Members: 185
- Fight song: "Go! Tigers! Go!"
- Website: www.memphis.edu/mightysound/

The Mighty Sound of the South is the official marching band of the University of Memphis. The band plays at Memphis Tigers football games as a marching band and at Tigers basketball games as a pep band. There are 185 members as of the 2024 season.

== History ==
The Tiger Band was founded in 1940.

At the end of the 1962-1963 basketball season, the Memphis State University basketball team had the distinction of being the only southern team invited to play in the National Invitational Tournament in Madison Square Garden. Thomas C. Ferguson, in only his second year as band director, decided the school's pep band should go to New York City to support these games. A pep band had never before played for a basketball game in the Garden, but they were to become the first.

Nineteen pep band members boarded a bus for New York City and using markers and an old bed sheet, they fashioned a makeshift sign with the words "The Mighty Sound of the South" and the name is still used for members of the current University of Memphis marching band.

The Mighty Sound of the South is officially charged with preserving the traditions of the Memphis Tigers and for performing “Go! Tigers! Go!” the Tigers’ fight song. The fight song was written by Tom Ferguson, former Director of Bands at Memphis State University during the 1960-1970s.

== Directors ==
The band is overseen by the director of bands at the University of Memphis, currently Albert Nguyen.

=== List of directors / assistant directors ===
- Lawrence "Pat" Cooney (1940–1950)
- Gaston Taylor (1950–1952)
- Ralph Hale (1953–1956)
- Olin Blickensderfer (1957–1959)
- Tom Ferguson (1962–1974)
- James Richens (1968–1970)
- Art Theil (1972–1986)
- Sidney McKay (1975–2002)
- James "Marty" Courtney (1987–1998)
- Geoff Carlton (1999)
- Nicholas Holland (2000–2011)
- Kraig Williams (2002–2011)
- Albert Nguyen (2008–present)
- Quintus F. Wrighten Jr. (2011–2012)
- Dan Kalantarian (2011–2016)
- Armand V. Hall (2012–2014)
- Dan Kalantarian (2014–2016)
- William J. Plenk (2017–present)
