= Riley Ferguson =

American football player (born 1995)

No. 4
- Position: Quarterback

Personal information
- Born: January 19, 1995 (age 31); Matthews, North Carolina, U.S.
- Listed height: 6 ft 4 in (1.93 m)
- Listed weight: 210 lb (95 kg)

Career information
- High school: David W. Butler (Matthews, North Carolina)
- College: Tennessee (2013); Coffeyville (2015); Memphis (2016–2017)
- NFL draft: 2018: undrafted

Career history
- Tampa Bay Buccaneers (2018)*
- * Offseason or practice squad member only

Awards and highlights
- First-team All-AAC (2017)
- Stats at Pro Football Reference

Riley Logan Ferguson (born January 19, 1995) is an American former football quarterback. He played college football at Memphis.

== Early life ==
Ferguson attended David W. Butler High School in Matthews, North Carolina. He had 2,173 passing yards and 25 touchdowns as a senior and 3,345 yards and 48 touchdowns as a junior. Ferguson helped lead Butler to North Carolina 4AA state championships in 2010 and 2012. He committed to the University of Tennessee to play college football.

== College career ==
As a freshman at Tennessee in 2013, Ferguson competed with Justin Worley, Nathan Peterman and Joshua Dobbs for the starting quarterback job. He suffered a leg injury during practice and took a medical redshirt. He was again competing for the starting job in 2014, but left the school in May 2014.

Ferguson enrolled at Coffeyville Community College in 2015. In his one season at Coffeyville, he passed for 2,942 yards and had 35 touchdowns.

Ferguson transferred to the University of Memphis in 2016. He was named the starter his first year at Memphis. In 13 starts, he threw for 3,698 yards and broke Paxton Lynch's previous years record with 32 touchdown passes.

== Professional career ==
Pre-draft measurables
Height	Weight	Arm length	Hand span	40-yard dash	20-yard shuttle	Three-cone drill	Vertical jump	Broad jump
6 ft 2 3/4 in (1.90 m)	212 lb (96 kg)	30 7/8 in (0.78 m)	9 5/8 in (0.24 m)	4.98 s	4.40 s	6.96 s	29.0 in (0.74 m)	9 ft 2 in (2.79 m)
All values from NFL Combine

=== Tampa Bay Buccaneers ===
Ferguson, after finishing his senior year, entered the 2018 NFL draft. Despite having the potential to be a sixth or seventh round pick, he went undrafted. He signed with the Tampa Bay Buccaneers as an undrafted free agent on April 29, 2018. On May 17, the Buccaneers waived Ferguson.
