= 2022 Memphis Tigers football team =

American college football season

2022 Memphis Tigers football

First Responder Bowl champion

First Responder Bowl, W 38–10 vs. Utah State
- Conference: American Athletic Conference
- Record: 7–6 (3–5 AAC)
- Head coach: Ryan Silverfield (3rd season)
- Offensive coordinator: Tim Cramsey (1st season)
- Offensive scheme: Pro spread
- Defensive coordinator: Matt Barnes (1st season)
- Base defense: 4–3
- Home stadium: Simmons Bank Liberty Stadium

2022 American Athletic Conference football standings
	Conf.			Overall
Team	W		L	W		L
No. 9 Tulane y$	7	–	1	12	–	2
UCF y	6	–	2	9	–	5
Cincinnati	6	–	2	9	–	4
SMU	5	–	3	7	–	6
Houston	5	–	3	8	–	5
East Carolina	4	–	4	8	–	5
Navy	4	–	4	4	–	8
Memphis	3	–	5	7	–	6
Tulsa	3	–	5	5	–	7
Temple	1	–	7	3	–	9
South Florida	0	–	8	1	–	11
Championship: Tulane 45, UCF 28
$ – Conference champion; y – Championship game participant; Rankings from AP Poll

The 2022 Memphis Tigers football team represented the University of Memphis in the 2022 NCAA Division I FBS football season. The Tigers played their home games at Liberty Bowl Memorial Stadium in Memphis, Tennessee, and competed in the American Athletic Conference (The American). They were led by third-year head coach Ryan Silverfield.

== Schedule ==
Memphis and The American announced the 2022 football schedule on February 17, 2022.

Date	Time	Opponent	Site	TV	Result	Attendance
September 3	6:30 p.m.	at Mississippi State*	Davis Wade Stadium; Starkville, MS	ESPNU	L 23–49	54,360
September 10	2:30 p.m.	at Navy	Navy–Marine Corps Memorial Stadium; Annapolis, MD	CBSSN	W 37–13	30,082
September 17	6:00 p.m.	Arkansas State*	Simmons Bank Liberty Stadium; Memphis, TN (Paint Bucket Bowl)	ESPN+	W 44–32	32,620
September 24	2:30 p.m.	North Texas*	Simmons Bank Liberty Stadium; Memphis, TN	ESPN+	W 44–34	23,203
October 1	11:00 a.m.	Temple	Simmons Bank Liberty Stadium; Memphis, TN	ESPNU	W 24–3	23,239
October 7	6:30 p.m.	Houston	Simmons Bank Liberty Stadium; Memphis, TN	ESPN2	L 32–33	28,126
October 15	6:30 p.m.	at East Carolina	Dowdy–Ficklen Stadium; Greenville, NC	ESPNU	L 45–47 ^{4OT}	38,059
October 22	2:30 p.m.	at No. 25 Tulane	Yulman Stadium; New Orleans, LA	ESPN2	L 28–38	30,100
November 5	2:30 p.m.	No. 25 UCF	Simmons Bank Liberty Stadium; Memphis, TN	ESPN2	L 28–35	28,048
November 10	6:30 p.m.	Tulsa	Simmons Bank Liberty Stadium; Memphis, TN	ESPN	W 26–10	23,980
November 19	1:00 p.m.	North Alabama*	Simmons Bank Liberty Stadium; Memphis, TN	ESPN+	W 59–0	24,154
November 26	2:30 p.m.	at SMU	Gerald J. Ford Stadium; University Park, TX	ESPN2	L 31–34	15,759
December 27	2:15 p.m.	vs. Utah State*	Gerald J. Ford Stadium; University Park, TX (First Responder Bowl)	ESPN	W 38–10	10,343
*Non-conference game; Rankings from AP Poll (and CFP Rankings, after November 1) - Released prior to game; All times are in Central time

== Game summaries ==
=== At Mississippi State ===
Memphis Tigers (0-0) vs Mississippi State Bulldogs (0-0)

Quarter	1	2	3	4	Total
Tigers	0	3	7	14	24
Bulldogs	14	14	7	14	49

at Davis Wade Stadium, Starkville, MS

- Date: September 3rd
- Game time: 6:30 p.m. EST
- Game weather: 82 °F (28 °C) • Weather: Rain
- Game attendance: 54,360
- Referee: Gary Patterson
- TV announcers (ESPNU): Clay Matvick (play-by-play), Rocky Boiman (analyst), & Dawn Davenport (sideline)

Statistics	Memphis	Mississippi State
First downs	13	34
Plays–yards	51–294	83–547
Rushes–yards	21–129	34–97
Passing yards	165	450
Passing: comp–att–int	19–30–0	38–49–1
Time of possession	18:49	41:11

Team	Category	Player	Statistics
Memphis	Passing	Seth Henigan	19/30, 165 yards, 1 TD
Memphis	Rushing	Jevyon Ducker	5 carries, 63 yards, 1 TD
Memphis	Receiving	Asa Martin	5 receptions, 58 yards
Mississippi State	Passing	Will Rogers	38/49, 450 yards, 5 TD, 1 INT
Mississippi State	Rushing	Dillon Johnson	14 carries, 67 yards
Mississippi State	Receiving	Rara Thomas	5 receptions, 81 yards, 1 TD

Scoring summary

Quarter	Time	Drive			Team	Scoring information	Score	
Quarter	Time	Plays	Yards	TOP	Team	Scoring information	Memphis	Mississippi State
							0	0
"TOP" = time of possession. For other American football terms, see Glossary of American football.							0	0

=== At Navy ===
Memphis Tigers (0-1) vs Navy Midshipmen (0-1)

Quarter	1	2	3	4	Total
Tigers	10	3	10	14	37
Midshipmen	7	0	0	6	13

at Navy-Marine Corps Memorial Stadium, Annapolis, MD

- Date: September 10th
- Game time: 2:30 p.m. EST
- Game weather: 78 °F (26 °C) • Weather: Sunny • Wind: SE 7 MPH
- Game attendance: 30,082
- Referee: Hank Jones
- TV announcers (CBSSN): Chick Hernandez (play-by-play), Randy Cross (analyst), & Sheehan Stanwick Burch (sideline)

Statistics	Memphis	Navy
First downs	18	17
Plays–yards	67–506	69–314
Rushes–yards	32–91	58–215
Passing yards	415	99
Passing: comp–att–int	24–35–0	3–11–2
Time of possession	27:36	32:34

Team	Category	Player	Statistics
Memphis	Passing	Seth Henigan	24/34, 415 yards, 2 TD
Memphis	Rushing	Asa Martin	5 carries, 56 yards, 1 TD
Memphis	Receiving	Gabriel Rogers	5 receptions, 95 yards
Navy	Passing	Tai Lavatai	3/7, 99 yards, 1 TD
Navy	Rushing	Maquel Haywood	8 carries, 54 yards
Navy	Receiving	Anton Hall Jr.	1 reception, 62 yards, 1 TD

Scoring summary

Quarter	Time	Drive			Team	Scoring information	Score	
Quarter	Time	Plays	Yards	TOP	Team	Scoring information	Memphis	Navy
1st	12:27	6	66	2:33	MEM	Caden Prieskorn 4-yard touchdown reception from Seth Henigan, Chris Howard kick good	7	0
1st	2:33	7	46	2:19	MEM	37-yard field goal by Chris Howard	10	0
1st	0:44	4	75	1:49	NAVY	Anton Hall Jr. 62-yard touchdown reception from Tai Lavatai, Evan Warren kick good	10	7
2nd	0:00	14	54	1:44	MEM	38-yard field goal by Chris Howard	13	7
3rd	11:56	1	79	0:11	MEM	Joseph Scates 79-yard touchdown reception from Seth Henigan, Chris Howard kick good	20	7
3rd	8:29	7	35	3:17	MEM	22-yard field goal by Chris Howard	23	7
4th	12:06	21	74	11:23	NAVY	Tai Lavatai 1-yard touchdown run, Two-point pass conversion kick failed	23	13
4th	6:05	13	88	6:01	MEM	Brandon Thomas 6-yard touchdown run, Chris Howard kick good	30	13
4th	3:49	7	35	3:17	MEM	Asa Martin 2-yard touchdown run, Chris Howard kick good	37	13
"TOP" = time of possession. For other American football terms, see Glossary of American football.							37	13

=== vs Arkansas State ===
Arkansas State Red Wolves (1-1) vs Memphis Tigers (1-1)

Quarter	1	2	3	4	Total
Red Wolves	7	10	0	15	32
Tigers	7	14	0	23	44

at Simmons Bank Liberty Stadium, Memphis, TN

- Date: September 17th
- Game time: 7:00
- Game weather: 87 °F (31 °C) • Weather: Sunny • Wind: SE 4 MPH
- Game attendance: 32,620
- Referee: Wayne Winkler
- TV announcers (ESPN+): Richard Cross (play-by-play) & Leger Douzable (analyst)

Statistics	Arkansas State	Memphis
First downs	22	25
Plays–yards	66–370	73–547
Rushes–yards	32–95	45–187
Passing yards	275	360
Passing: comp–att–int	25–34–0	19–28–0
Time of possession	29:51	30:09

Team	Category	Player	Statistics
Arkansas State	Passing	James Blackman	25/34, 275 yards, 2 TD
Arkansas State	Rushing	Brian Snead	13 carries, 66 yards, 2 TD
Arkansas State	Receiving	Seydou Traore	6 receptions, 120 yards, 1 TD
Memphis	Passing	Seth Henigan	19/28, 360 yards, 3 TD
Memphis	Rushing	Jevyon Ducker	10 carries, 76 yards, 1 TD
Memphis	Receiving	Gabriel Rogers	5 receptions, 86 yards

Scoring summary

Quarter	Time	Drive			Team	Scoring information	Score	
Quarter	Time	Plays	Yards	TOP	Team	Scoring information	Arkansas State	Memphis
							0	0
"TOP" = time of possession. For other American football terms, see Glossary of American football.							0	0

=== vs North Texas ===
North Texas Mean Green (2-2) vs Memphis Tigers (2-1)

Quarter	1	2	3	4	Total
Mean Green	10	3	7	14	34
Tigers	6	14	7	17	44

at Simmons Bank Liberty Stadium, Memphis, TN

- Date: September 24th
- Game time: 3:30 p.m.
- Game weather: 93 °F (34 °C) • Weather: Cloudy • Wind: SW 8 MPH
- Game attendance: 23,203
- Referee: Ed Ardito
- TV announcers (ESPN+): Tony Simeone (play-by-play) & Leger Douzable (analyst)

Statistics	North Texas	Memphis
First downs	23	19
Plays–yards	80–473	73–334
Rushes–yards	30–102	44–193
Passing yards	371	141
Passing: comp–att–int	27–50–2	19–29–1
Time of possession	27:15	32:45

Team	Category	Player	Statistics
North Texas	Passing	Austin Aune	27/49, 371 yards, 3 TD, 2 INT
North Texas	Rushing	Oscar Adaway III	12 carries, 46 yards
North Texas	Receiving	Jordan Smart	5 receptions, 82 yards
Memphis	Passing	Seth Henigan	19/29, 141 yards, 2 TD, 1 INT
Memphis	Rushing	Brandon Thomas	15 carries, 84 yards, 2 TD
Memphis	Receiving	Koby Drake	3 receptions, 41 yards

Scoring summary

Quarter	Time	Drive			Team	Scoring information	Score	
Quarter	Time	Plays	Yards	TOP	Team	Scoring information	North Texas	Memphis
							0	0
"TOP" = time of possession. For other American football terms, see Glossary of American football.							0	0

=== vs Temple ===
Temple Owls (2-2) vs Memphis Tigers (3-1)

Quarter	1	2	3	4	Total
Owls	0	3	0	0	3
Tigers	0	0	7	17	24

at Simmons Bank Liberty Stadium, Memphis, TN

- Date: October 1st
- Game time: 12:00 p.m.
- Game weather: 69 °F (21 °C) • Weather: Sunny • Wind: N 6 MPH
- Game attendance: 23,239
- Referee: Steve Anderson
- TV announcers (ESPNU): John Schriffen (play-by-play) & Rocky Boiman (analyst)

Statistics	Temple	Memphis
First downs	7	22
Plays–yards	59–297	89–331
Rushes–yards	22–52	44–136
Passing yards	245	195
Passing: comp–att–int	18–37–3	24–45–0
Time of possession	25:31	34:29

Team	Category	Player	Statistics
Temple	Passing	E.J. Warner	18/37, 245 yards, 3 INT
Temple	Rushing	Jakari Norwood	4 carries, 18 yards
Temple	Receiving	Jose Barbom	5 receptions, 134 yards
Memphis	Passing	Seth Henigan	24/45, 195 yards, 1 TD
Memphis	Rushing	Seth Henigan	19 carries, 60 yards
Memphis	Receiving	Caden Prieskorn	3 receptions, 40 yards, 1 TD

Scoring summary

Quarter	Time	Drive			Team	Scoring information	Score	
Quarter	Time	Plays	Yards	TOP	Team	Scoring information	Temple	Memphis
							0	0
"TOP" = time of possession. For other American football terms, see Glossary of American football.							0	0

=== vs Houston ===
Houston Cougars (2-3) vs Memphis Tigers (4-1)

Quarter	1	2	3	4	Total
Cougars	0	7	0	26	33
Tigers	14	3	3	12	32

at Simmons Bank Liberty Stadium, Memphis, TN

- Date: October 7th
- Game time: 7:30 p.m.
- Game weather: 72 °F (22 °C) • Weather: Sunny • Wind: N 10 MPH
- Game attendance: 28,126
- Referee: Henry Johns
- TV announcers (ESPN2): Roy Philpott (play-by-play), Andre Ware (analyst), & Paul Carcaterra (sideline)

Statistics	Houston	Memphis
First downs	25	25
Plays–yards	81–463	75–438
Rushes–yards	23–97	41–156
Passing yards	366	282
Passing: comp–att–int	36–58–1	22–34–0
Time of possession	26:22	33:38

Team	Category	Player	Statistics
Houston	Passing	Clayton Tune	36/57, 366 yards, 3 TD, 1 INT
Houston	Rushing	Brandon Campbell	12 carries, 53 yards
Houston	Receiving	Samuel Brown	9 receptions, 116 yards
Memphis	Passing	Seth Henigan	21/32, 241 yards, 1 TD
Memphis	Rushing	Jevyon Ducker	10 carries, 38 yards
Memphis	Receiving	Gabriel Rogers	5 receptions, 71 yards

Scoring summary

Quarter	Time	Drive			Team	Scoring information	Score	
Quarter	Time	Plays	Yards	TOP	Team	Scoring information	Houston	Memphis
							0	0
"TOP" = time of possession. For other American football terms, see Glossary of American football.							0	0

=== At East Carolina ===
Memphis Tigers (4-2) vs East Carolina Pirates (3-3)

Quarter	1	2	3	4	OT	2OT	3OT	4OT	Total
Tigers	7	10	3	10	7	6	2	0	45
Pirates	0	13	7	10	7	6	2	2	47

at Dowdy-Ficklen Stadium, Greenville, NC

- Date: October 15th
- Game time: 7:30 p.m. EST
- Game weather: 66 °F (19 °C) • Weather: Clear • Wind: W 9 MPH
- Game attendance: 38,059
- Referee: Nate Black
- TV announcers (ESPNU): Brian Custer (play-by-play), Dustin Fox (analyst), & Lauren Sisler (sideline)

Statistics	Memphis	East Carolina
First downs	24	25
Plays–yards	72–491	77–473
Rushes–yards	35–84	42–169
Passing yards	407	304
Passing: comp–att–int	27–37–2	26–35–0
Time of possession	24:27	32:09

Team	Category	Player	Statistics
Memphis	Passing	Seth Henigan	27/37, 407 yards, 2 TD, 2 INT
Memphis	Rushing	Asa Martin	12 carries, 59 yards, 2 TD
Memphis	Receiving	Joe Scates	5 receptions, 112 yards, 1 TD
East Carolina	Passing	Holton Ahlers	26/34, 304 yards, 1 TD
East Carolina	Rushing	Keaton Mitchell	29 carries, 149 yards, 3 TD
East Carolina	Receiving	Isaiah Winstead	9 receptions, 154 yards, 1 TD

Scoring summary

Quarter	Time	Drive			Team	Scoring information	Score	
Quarter	Time	Plays	Yards	TOP	Team	Scoring information	Memphis	East Carolina
							0	0
"TOP" = time of possession. For other American football terms, see Glossary of American football.							0	0

=== At No. 25 Tulane ===
Memphis Tigers (4-3) vs No. 25 Tulane Green Wave (6-1)

Quarter	1	2	3	4	Total
Tigers	0	0	14	14	28
No. 25 Green Wave	21	14	0	3	38

at Yulman Stadium, New Orleans, LA

- Date: October 22nd
- Game time: 3:30 p.m. EST
- Game weather: 80 °F (27 °C) • Weather: Sunny • Wind: SE 10 MPH
- Game attendance: 30,100
- Referee: Edwin Lee
- TV announcers (ESPN2): Beth Mowins (play-by-play), Kirk Morrison (analyst), & Stormy Buonantony (sideline)

Game information

First quarter

- (9:39) TUL – Michael Pratt 6-yard run, Valentino Ambrosio kick (Drive: 11 plays, 80 yards, 5:21; Tulane 7–0)
- (8:09) TUL – Jha'Quan Jackson 90-yard punt return, Valentino Ambrosio kick (Drive: 3 plays, 6 yards, 1:30; Tulane 14–0)
- (2:02) TUL – Tyjae Spears 3-yard run, Valentino Ambrosio kick (Drive: 3 plays, 12 yards, 0:52; Tulane 21–0)

Second quarter

- (5:49) TUL – Shaadie Clayton-Johnson 4-yard run, Valentino Ambrosio kick (Drive: 10 plays, 70 yards, 4:46; Tulane 28–0)
- (0:25) TUL – Duece Watts 6-yard pass from Michael Pratt, Valentino Ambrosio kick (Drive: 10 plays, 53 yards, 3:17; Tulane 35–0)

Third quarter

- (8:48) MEM – Koby Drake 7-yard pass from Seth Henigan, Chris Howard kick (Drive: 13 plays, 75 yards, 6:12; Tulane 35–7)
- (4:05) MEM – Eddie Lewis 33-yard pass from Seth Henigan, Chris Howard kick (Drive: 8 plays, 68 yards, 3:38; Tulane 35–14)

Fourth quarter

- (14:02) MEM – Brandon Thomas 2-yard run, Chris Howard kick (Drive: 8 plays, 34 yards, 3:13; Tulane 35–21)
- (7:40) TUL – Valentino Ambrosio 25-yard field goal (Drive: 13 plays, 67 yards, 6:22; Tulane 38–21)
- (4:23) MEM – Eddie Lewis 55-yard pass from Seth Henigan, Chris Howard kick (Drive: 10 plays, 83 yards, 3:11; Tulane 38–28)

Statistics	Memphis	Tulane
First downs	23	19
Plays–yards	74–415	70–344
Rushes–yards	33–103	41–186
Passing yards	312	158
Passing: comp–att–int	26–41–2	20–29–0
Time of possession	27:44	32:16

Team	Category	Player	Statistics
Memphis	Passing	Seth Henigan	26/41, 312 yards, 3 TD, 2 INT
Memphis	Rushing	Seth Henigan	13 carries, 42 yards
Memphis	Receiving	Eddie Lewis	3 receptions, 94 yards, 2 TD
Tulane	Passing	Michael Pratt	20/29, 158 yards, 1 TD
Tulane	Rushing	Tyjae Spears	24 carries, 125 yards, 1 TD
Tulane	Receiving	Dea Dea McDougle	5 receptions, 37 yards

Scoring summary

Quarter	Time	Drive			Team	Scoring information	Score	
Quarter	Time	Plays	Yards	TOP	Team	Scoring information	Memphis	Tulane
							0	0
"TOP" = time of possession. For other American football terms, see Glossary of American football.							0	0

=== vs No. 25 UCF ===
No. 25 UCF Knights (6-2) vs Memphis Tigers (4-4)

Quarter	1	2	3	4	Total
No. 25 Knights	7	14	0	14	35
Tigers	7	7	7	7	28

at Simmons Bank Liberty Stadium, Memphis, TN

- Date: November 5th
- Game time: TBD
- Game weather: 61 °F (16 °C) • Weather: Sunny • Wind: SW 11 MPH
- Game attendance: 28,048
- Referee: Kevin Randall
- TV announcers (ESPN2): Beth Mowins (play-by-play), Kirk Morrison (analyst), & Stormy Buonantony (sideline)

Statistics	UCF	Memphis
First downs	24	27
Plays–yards	71–427	75–433
Rushes–yards	42–204	36–149
Passing yards	223	284
Passing: comp–att–int	23–29–1	26–39–2
Time of possession	29:07	30:53

Team	Category	Player	Statistics
UCF	Passing	Mikey Keene	22/28, 219 yards, 3 TD, 1 INT
UCF	Rushing	RJ Harvey	17 carries, 151 yards, 1 TD
UCF	Receiving	Kobe Hudson	6 receptions, 85 yards, 2 TD
Memphis	Passing	Seth Henigan	26/39, 284 yards, 1 TD, 2 INT
Memphis	Rushing	Seth Henigan	16 carries, 69 yards, 1 TD
Memphis	Receiving	Caden Prieskorn	5 receptions, 76 yards

Scoring summary

Quarter	Time	Drive			Team	Scoring information	Score	
Quarter	Time	Plays	Yards	TOP	Team	Scoring information	UCF	Memphis
							0	0
"TOP" = time of possession. For other American football terms, see Glossary of American football.							0	0

=== vs Tulsa ===
Tulsa Golden Hurricanes (3-6) vs Memphis Tigers (4-5)

Quarter	1	2	3	4	Total
Golden Hurricanes	3	0	0	7	10
Tigers	10	10	3	3	26

at Simmons Bank Liberty Stadium, Memphis, TN

- Date: November 10th
- Game time: 6:30 p.m. EST
- Game weather: 64 °F (18 °C) • Weather: Clear • Wind: N 1 MPH
- Game attendance: 23,980
- Referee: Luke Richmond
- TV announcers (ESPN): Matt Barrie (play-by-play), Louis Riddick (analyst), & Harry Lyles, Jr. (sideline)

Statistics	Tulsa	Memphis
First downs	12	17
Plays–yards	60–207	73–341
Rushes–yards	23–31	39–79
Passing yards	176	262
Passing: comp–att–int	17–37–1	20–34–0
Time of possession	23:46	36:14

Team	Category	Player	Statistics
Tulsa	Passing	Braylon Braxton	12/24, 128 yards, 1 TD
Tulsa	Rushing	Deneric Prince	9 carries, 31 yards
Tulsa	Receiving	Keylon Stokes	6 receptions, 68 yards, 1 TD
Memphis	Passing	Seth Henigan	20/34, 262 yards, 1 TD
Memphis	Rushing	Jevyon Ducker	14 carries, 32 yards
Memphis	Receiving	Javon Ivory	7 receptions, 123 yards, 1 TD

Scoring summary

Quarter	Time	Drive			Team	Scoring information	Score	
Quarter	Time	Plays	Yards	TOP	Team	Scoring information	Tulsa	Memphis
							0	0
"TOP" = time of possession. For other American football terms, see Glossary of American football.							0	0

=== vs North Alabama ===
North Alabama Lions (1-9) vs Memphis Tigers (5-5)

Quarter	1	2	3	4	Total
Lions	0	0	0	0	0
Tigers	14	24	14	7	59

at Simmons Bank Liberty Stadium, Memphis, TN

- Date: November 19th
- Game time: TBD
- Game weather: 39 °F (4 °C) • Weather: Sunny • Wind: SW 6 MPH
- Game attendance: 24,154
- Referee: Tim Rich
- TV announcers (ESPN+): Ted Emrich (play-by-play) & Leger Douzable (analyst)

Statistics	North Alabama	Memphis
First downs	9	28
Plays–yards	49–124	72–493
Rushes–yards	30–100	43–246
Passing yards	24	247
Passing: comp–att–int	6–19–2	18–29–0
Time of possession	26:18	33:42

Team	Category	Player	Statistics
North Alabama	Passing	Noah Walters	6/19, 24 yards, 2 INT
North Alabama	Rushing	Noah Walters	9 carries, 56 yards
North Alabama	Receiving	Takairee Kenebrew	1 reception, 9 yards
Memphis	Passing	Seth Henigan	14/24, 218 yards, 1 TD
Memphis	Rushing	An'Darius Coffey	14 carries, 83 yards
Memphis	Receiving	Eddie Lewis	3 receptions, 73 yards, 1 TD

Scoring summary

Quarter	Time	Drive			Team	Scoring information	Score	
Quarter	Time	Plays	Yards	TOP	Team	Scoring information	North Alabama	Memphis
							0	0
"TOP" = time of possession. For other American football terms, see Glossary of American football.							0	0

=== At SMU ===
Memphis Tigers (6-5) vs SMU Mustangs (6-5)

Quarter	1	2	3	4	Total
Tigers	7	10	6	8	31
Mustangs	0	14	10	10	34

at Gerald J. Ford Stadium, University Park, TX

- Date: November 26th
- Game time: 2:30 p.m. CST
- Game weather: 52 °F (11 °C) • Weather: Rain • Wind: NE 13 MPH
- Game attendance: 15,759
- Referee: Kevin Randall
- TV announcers (ESPN2): Chris Cotter (play-by-play), Mark Herzlich (analyst), & Lericia Harris (sideline)

Statistics	Memphis	SMU
First downs	26	20
Plays–yards	78–439	75–424
Rushes–yards	33–152	37–113
Passing yards	287	311
Passing: comp–att–int	27–45–1	28–38–0
Time of possession	31:18	28:42

Team	Category	Player	Statistics
Memphis	Passing	Seth Henigan	27/44, 287 yards, 1 TD, 1 INT
Memphis	Rushing	Jevyon Ducker	10 carries, 81 yards
Memphis	Receiving	Javon Ivory	6 receptions, 98 yards
SMU	Passing	Tanner Mordecai	22/30, 228 yards, 2 TD
SMU	Rushing	Tyler Lavine	25 carries, 64 yards, 2 TD
SMU	Receiving	Rashee Rice	13 receptions, 147 yards, 1 TD

Scoring summary

Quarter	Time	Drive			Team	Scoring information	Score	
Quarter	Time	Plays	Yards	TOP	Team	Scoring information	Memphis	SMU
1st	8:33	13	75	6:27	MEM	Sutton Smith 5-yard touchdown run, Chris Howard kick good	7	0
2nd	13:47	14	75	4:14	SMU	Jordan Kerley 4-yard touchdown reception from Tanner Mordecai, Collin Rogers kick good	7	7
2nd	10:51	6	65	2:50	MEM	Asa Martin 3-yard touchdown run, Chris Howard kick good	14	7
2nd	1:15	16	91	6:27	SMU	Tyler Lavine 1-yard touchdown run, Collin Rogers kick good	14	14
2nd	0:00	6	51	1:08	MEM	42-yard field goal by Chris Howard	17	14
3rd	10:15	10	75	4:45	SMU	Tyler Lavine 3-yard touchdown run, Collin Rogers kick good	17	21
3rd	5:52	9	27	3:22	SMU	27-yard field goal by Collin Rogers	17	24
3rd	0:00	12	65	5:52	MEM	Gabriel Rogers 5-yard touchdown run, kick blocked	23	24
4th	13:11	4	49	1:42	SMU	Rashee Rice 24-yard touchdown reception from Tanner Mordecai, Collin Rogers kick good	23	31
4th	6:13	12	66	4:32	SMU	23-yard field goal by Collin Rogers	23	34
4th	2:36	12	70	3:30	SMU	Roc Taylor 7-yard touchdown reception from Seth Henigan, Seth Hennigan pass to Gabriel Rogers kick good	31	34
"TOP" = time of possession. For other American football terms, see Glossary of American football.							31	34
