= 2019 Cotton Bowl Classic =

Postseason college football bowl game

2019 Goodyear Cotton Bowl Classic
- CFP New Year's Six; 84th Cotton Bowl Classic
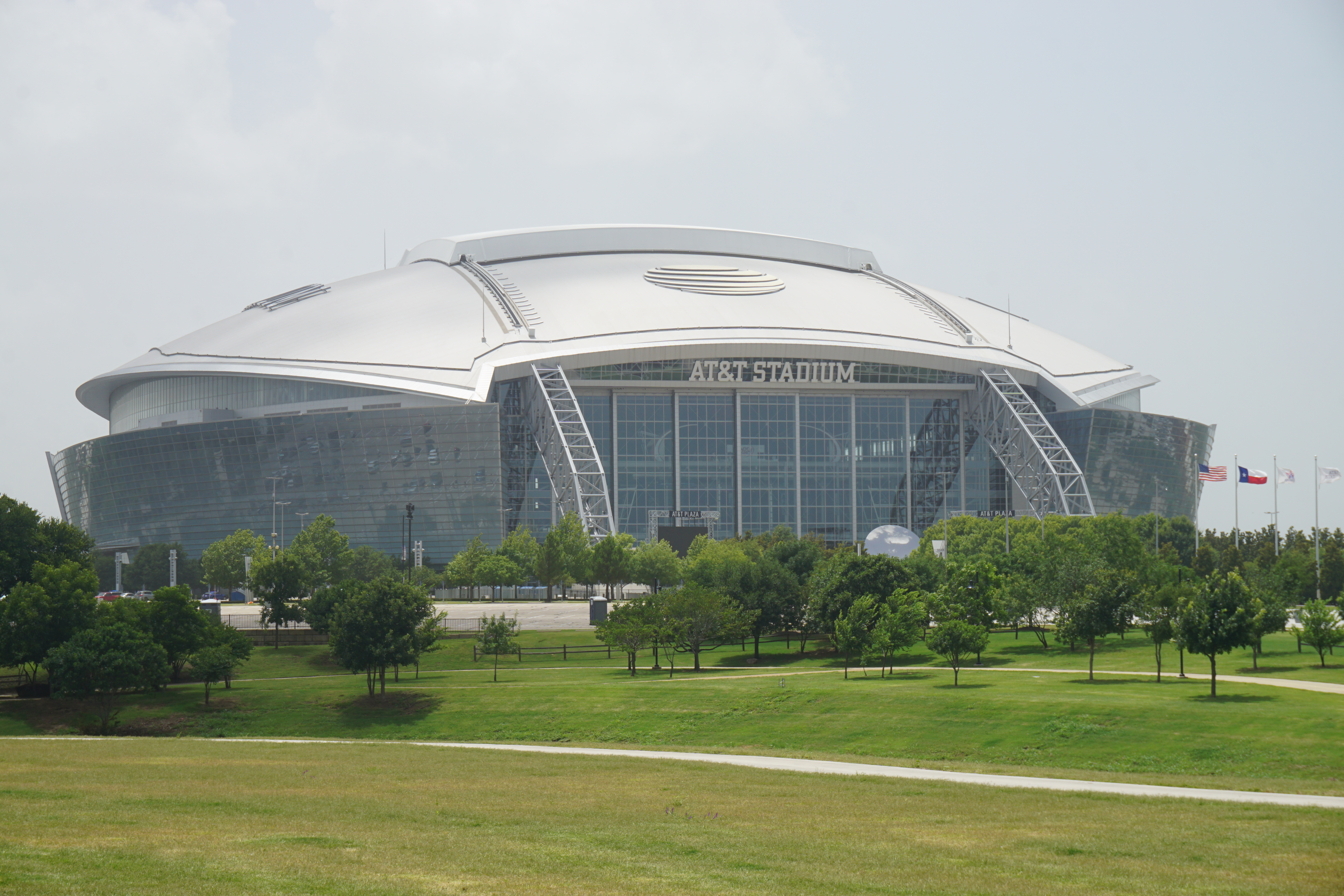
- AT&T Stadium in Arlington, Texas, hosted the Cotton Bowl Classic.
| Memphis Tigers | Penn State Nittany Lions |
| (12–1) | (10–2) |
| AAC | Big Ten |
| 39 | 53 |
| Head coach: Ryan Silverfield | Head coach: James Franklin |
| AP / Coaches / CFP; 15 / 15 / 17 | AP / Coaches / CFP; 13 / 12 / 10 |
| | 1 | 2 | 3 | 4 | Total |
|---|---|---|---|---|---|
| Memphis | 13 | 10 | 13 | 3 | 39 |
| Penn State | 7 | 28 | 10 | 8 | 53 |
- Date: December 28, 2019
- Season: 2019
- Stadium: AT&T Stadium
- Location: Arlington, Texas
- MVP: Journey Brown (RB, Penn State); Micah Parsons (LB, Penn State)
- Favorite: Penn State by 6.5
- Referee: Jeff Flanagan (ACC)
- Attendance: 54,828

United States TV coverage
- Network: ESPN and ESPN Radio
- Announcers: ESPN: Mark Jones (play-by-play); Dusty Dvoracek (analyst); Olivia Dekker (sideline); ESPN Radio: Brad Sham, Jordan Rodgers, Kris Budden
- Nielsen ratings: 3.8 (6.22 million viewers)

International TV coverage
- Network: ESPN Brasil
- Announcers: Matheus Suman (play-by-play); Weinny Eirado (analyst)

The 2019 Cotton Bowl Classic was a college football bowl game played on December 28, 2019, with kickoff at 12:00 p.m. EST (11:00 a.m. local CST) on ESPN. It was the 84th edition of the Cotton Bowl Classic, and was one of the 2019–20 bowl games concluding the 2019 FBS football season. Sponsored by the Goodyear Tire and Rubber Company, the game was officially known as the Goodyear Cotton Bowl Classic.

== Teams ==
The participants were selected by the College Football Playoff selection committee on December 8, 2019. This was the first meeting between the Memphis and Penn State programs.

=== Memphis Tigers ===
Memphis entered the game with a 12–1 record (7–1 in conference), ranked 15th in the AP Poll. The Tigers tied with Navy for first place of the West Division of the American Athletic Conference (AAC). Due to their win over Navy during the regular season, Memphis advanced to the AAC Championship Game, where they defeated Cincinnati, 29–24.

Memphis was selected to the Cotton Bowl as the highest-ranked team from the Group of Five conferences, a spot they secured by winning the AAC championship. This was Memphis' first Cotton Bowl Classic, as well as their first New Year's Six game overall. At the time the Tigers received their bowl invitation, the status of head coach Mike Norvell was unclear, as he had accepted an offer to become the new head coach of the Florida State Seminoles. On December 9, Norvell announced that he would not coach Memphis in the bowl, allowing interim head coach Ryan Silverfield to do so. On December 13, it was announced that the interim tag would be removed and that Silverfield was being hired as the new head coach of Memphis.

=== Penn State Nittany Lions ===
Penn State entered the game ranked 13th in the AP Poll, with a 10–2 record (7–2 in conference). The Nittany Lions finished second in the Big Ten's East Division. They split their four games against ranked opponents, defeating Iowa and Michigan while losing to Minnesota and Ohio State.

Penn State was selected to the Cotton Bowl as the highest-ranked team not already selected to a New Year's Six bowl. This was Penn State's fourth Cotton Bowl Classic; the Nittany Lions have a 2–0–1 record in the game, most recently their 1974 team winning the 1975 Cotton Bowl Classic over Baylor, 41–20.

== Game summary ==
2019 Goodyear Cotton Bowl Classic

| Quarter | 1 | 2 | 3 | 4 | Total |
|---|---|---|---|---|---|
| No. 17 Memphis | 13 | 10 | 13 | 3 | 39 |
| No. 10 Penn State | 7 | 28 | 10 | 8 | 53 |

at AT&T Stadium • Arlington, Texas

- Date: Saturday, December 28, 2019
- Game time: 12:00 p.m. EST (11:00 a.m. CST)
- Game weather: Indoors (roof closed)
- Game attendance: 54,828
- Referee: Jeff Flanagan
- TV announcers (ESPN): Mark Jones (play-by-play), Dusty Dvoracek (analyst) and Olivia Dekker (sideline)
- ESPN game summary

Game information

First Quarter

- (10:52) MEM – Riley Patterson 48 yard field goal (Drive: 11 plays, 58 yards, 2:59; Memphis 3–0)
- (9:56) PSU – Journey Brown 32 yard rush, Jake Pinegar kick (Drive: 3 plays, 75 yards, 0:56; Penn State 7–3)
- (7:44) MEM – Patrick Taylor 3 yard rush, Riley Patterson kick (Drive: 6 plays, 75 yards, 2:12; Memphis 10–7)
- (2:55) MEM – Riley Patterson 37 yard field goal (Drive: 10 plays, 40 yards, 3:36; Memphis 13–7)

Second Quarter

- (11:14) PSU – Noah Cain 1 yard rush, Jack Pinegar kick (Drive: 8 plays, 45 yards, 3:27; Penn State 14–13)
- (7:47) PSU – Devyn Ford 2 yard rush, Jack Pinegar kick (Drive: 4 plays, 32 yards, 1:14; Penn State 21–13)
- (5:51) PSU – Journey Brown 56 yard rush, Jack Pinegar kick (Drive: 1 plays, 56 yards, 0:10; Penn State 28–13)
- (3:15) MEM – Kenneth Gainwell 2 yard rush, Riley Patterson kick (Drive: 7 plays, 75 yards, 2:36; Penn State 28–20)
- (0:51) PSU – Sean Clifford 4 yard pass to Jahan Dotson, Jack Pinegar kick (Drive: 10 plays, 75 yards, 2:24; Penn State 35–20)
- (0:00) MEM – Riley Patterson 44 yard field goal (Drive: 8 plays, 49 yards, 0:51; Penn State 35–23)

Third Quarter

- (12:16) MEM – Brady White 1 yard rush, Riley Patterson kick (Drive: 6 plays, 75 yards, 2:44; Penn State 35–30)
- (10:24) MEM – Riley Patterson 51 yard field goal (Drive: 4 plays, –4 yards, 1:45; Penn State 35–33)
- (7:13) PSU – Jake Pinegar 45 yard field goal (Drive: 8 plays, 46 yards, 3:06; Penn State 38–33)
- (3:32) MEM – Riley Patterson 41 yard field goal (Drive: 11 plays, 52 yards, 3:41; Penn State 38–36)
- (0:38) PSU – Garrett Taylor 15 yard interception return, Jake Pinegar kick (Penn State 45–36)

Fourth Quarter

- (12:01) MEM – Riley Patterson 42 yard field goal (Drive: 9 plays, 51 yards, 3:37; Penn State 45–39)
- (6:31) PSU – Noah Cain 1 yard rush, 2-point pass good (Drive: 12 plays, 75 yards, 5:30; Penn State 53–39)

=== Statistics ===
| Statistics | MEM | PSU |
|---|---|---|
| First downs | 27 | 25 |
| Plays–yards | 86–542 | 73–529 |
| Rushes–yards | 33–63 | 53–396 |
| Passing yards | 479 | 133 |
| Passing: comp–att–int | 33–53–2 | 11–20–1 |
| Time of possession | 32:42 | 27:18 |

| Team | Category | Player | Statistics |
|---|---|---|---|
| Memphis | Passing | Brady White | 32/51, 454 yards, 2 INT |
| Memphis | Rushing | Patrick Taylor | 8 carries, 50 yards, 1 TD |
| Memphis | Receiving | Damonte Coxie | 8 receptions, 132 yards |
| Penn State | Passing | Sean Clifford | 11/20, 133 yards, 1 TD, 1 INT |
| Penn State | Rushing | Journey Brown | 16 carries, 202 yards, 2 TD |
| Penn State | Receiving | K. J. Hamler | 2 receptions, 46 yards |
