= Duke Calhoun =

American gridiron football player (born 1987)

- Calhoun signing autographs at Giants training camp 2011

No. 84, 14
- Position: Wide receiver

Personal information
- Born: September 1, 1987 (age 39); Memphis, Tennessee, U.S.
- Listed height: 6 ft 4 in (1.93 m)
- Listed weight: 205 lb (93 kg)

Career information
- High school: Raleigh-Egypt (Memphis)
- College: Memphis
- NFL draft: 2010: undrafted

Career history
- New York Giants (2010); Oakland Raiders (2012); Saskatchewan Roughriders (2014)

Awards and highlights
- Second-team All-C-USA (2009)

Career NFL statistics
- Receptions: 1
- Receiving yards: 4
- Stats at Pro Football Reference

Duke Calhoun (born September 1, 1987) is an American former professional football player who was a wide receiver in the National Football League (NFL). He played college football for the Memphis Tigers. He was signed by the New York Giants as an undrafted free agent in the 2010 offseason and was waived by the Giants in the 2011 offseason. He signed with Oakland in April 2012.

== Early life ==
Calhoun attended Raleigh Egypt High School in the Raleigh section of Memphis, Tennessee.

== College career ==
Calhoun holds the Memphis school record with 10 career 100-yard games. Ranks second all-time in career yards with 2,981 moving ahead of Earnest Gray's 2,123 yards. Ranks second all-time receptions. He caught 19 touchdowns in his Memphis career which at the time tied the record for second place all time at Memphis. Finished his career with a school record 49-game receiving streak, which ranked third nationally. He was voted the team's Most Valuable Player in 2009.

== Professional career ==
=== Statistics ===
		Receiving							Fumbles	
Year	Team	G	GS	Rec	Yds	Avg	Lng	TD	FUM	Lost
2010	NYG	7	0	1	4	4.0	4	0	-	-
Total		7	0	1	4	4.0	4	0	0	0
