= Memphis Tigers football =

Football team representing the University of Memphis

2026 Memphis Tigers football team
- First season: 1912; 114 years ago
- Athletic director: Ed Scott
- Head coach: Charles Huff; 1st season, 5–1 (.833)
- Location: Memphis, Tennessee
- Stadium: Simmons Bank Liberty Stadium (capacity: 45,632)
- NCAA division: Division I FBS
- Conference: American
- Colors: Blue and gray
- All-time record: 553–543–33 (.504)
- Bowl record: 9–8 (.529)

Conference championships
- Miss. Valley: 1929, 1930 SIAA: 1938 MVC: 1968, 1969, 1971 American: 2014, 2019

Division championships
- AAC West: 2017, 2018, 2019
- Rivalries: Arkansas State (rivalry); Cincinnati (rivalry); Louisville (rivalry); Ole Miss (rivalry); Southern Miss (rivalry); UAB (rivalry)
- Fight song: Go Tigers Go
- Mascot: Pouncer
- Marching band: Mighty Sound of the South
- Website: gotigersgo.com

The Memphis Tigers football team represents the University of Memphis in college football in the NCAA Division I Football Bowl Subdivision (FBS). The Tigers play in the American Conference as an all-sports member. They play home games at Simmons Bank Liberty Stadium. The team's newly hired head coach is Charles Huff. Since their inaugural season in 1912, the Memphis Tigers have won over 500 games and have appeared in 17 bowl games.

For much of its history, the Memphis Tigers football program was subpar with occasional flashes of moderate success while being overshadowed by the university's more successful men's basketball program. However, since the tenure of former head coach Justin Fuente, the Tigers football program has been more successful. As of the end of the 2025 season, Memphis has earned bowl eligibility by winning at least six of 12 regular season games every year since 2014. This is the seventh-longest active streak in the FBS. The program has also claimed eight conference championships, most recently in 2019.

== Conference affiliations ==
- Independent (1912–1927, 1947–1967, 1973–1995)
- Mississippi Valley Conference (1928–1934)
- SIAA (1935–1942)
- Missouri Valley (1968–1972)
- Conference USA (1996–2012)
- American Athletic Conference (2013–present)

== Championships ==
=== Conference championships ===
Year	Conference	Coach	Record	Conference Record
1929	Mississippi Valley Conference	Zach Curlin	8–0–2	5–0–1
1930	Mississippi Valley Conference	Zach Curlin	6–3–1	6–1
1938	Southern Intercollegiate Athletic Association	Allyn McKeen	10–0	7–0
1968	Missouri Valley Conference	Billy J. Murphy	6–4	4–0
1969	Missouri Valley Conference	Billy J. Murphy	8–2	4–0
1971	Missouri Valley Conference	Billy J. Murphy	5–6	2–1
2014^{†}	American Athletic Conference	Justin Fuente	10–3	7–1
2019	American Athletic Conference	Mike Norvell	12–1	7–1

† Co-champions

=== Division championships ===
Season	Division	Coach	Opponent	CG result
2017	AAC West	Mike Norvell	UCF	L 55–62^{2OT}
2018^{†}	AAC West	Mike Norvell	UCF	L 41–56
2019^{†}	AAC West	Mike Norvell	Cincinnati	W 29–24

† Co-champions

== Bowl games ==
The Memphis Tigers have received 19 bowl invitations in their history and hold a record of 9–9 in bowl games with one cancellation. This includes the 1956 Burley Bowl, which was not an NCAA sanctioned bowl. Memphis went through a 32-year bowl game drought from 1971 to 2003, but has since had a five-year bowl streak (2003–2008) and the current twelve-year streak (since 2014). The team made its first appearance in a New Years Six bowl when they were selected to play in the 2019 Cotton Bowl Classic as the highest ranked (AP #15) Group of Five conference champion. The Tigers’ 2023 Liberty Bowl victory was the school's first over a Power 5 opponent.

Season	Head Coach	Bowl	Opponent	Result
1956	Ralph Hatley	Burley Bowl	East Tennessee State	W 32–12
1971	Billy J. Murphy	Pasadena Bowl	San Jose State	W 28–9
2003	Tommy West	New Orleans Bowl	North Texas	W 27–17
2004	Tommy West	GMAC Bowl	Bowling Green	L 35–52
2005	Tommy West	Motor City Bowl	Akron	W 38–31
2007	Tommy West	New Orleans Bowl	Florida Atlantic	L 27–44
2008	Tommy West	St. Petersburg Bowl	South Florida	L 14–41
2014	Justin Fuente	Miami Beach Bowl	BYU	W 55–48
2015	Darrell Dickey (interim)	Birmingham Bowl	Auburn	L 10–31
2016	Mike Norvell	Boca Raton Bowl	Western Kentucky	L 31–51
2017	Mike Norvell	Liberty Bowl	Iowa State	L 20–21
2018	Mike Norvell	Birmingham Bowl	Wake Forest	L 34–37
2019	Ryan Silverfield	Cotton Bowl Classic †	Penn State	L 39–53
2020	Ryan Silverfield	Montgomery Bowl	Florida Atlantic	W 25–10
2021	Ryan Silverfield	Hawaii Bowl	Hawaii	Canceled
2022	Ryan Silverfield	First Responder Bowl	Utah State	W 38–10
2023	Ryan Silverfield	Liberty Bowl	Iowa State	W 36–26
2024	Ryan Silverfield	Frisco Bowl	West Virginia	W 42–37
2025	Reggie Howard (interim)	Gasparilla Bowl	NC State	L 7–31

† New Year's Six

== Head coaches ==
Coach	Tenure	Seasons	Record	Pct.
Clyde H. Wilson	1912–1915	4	9–12–1	.432
Tom Shea	1916	1	2–3–1	.417
V. M. Campbell	1917, 1919	2	6–6	.500
John Childerson	1918	1	2–4	.333
Elmore George	1920	1	0–5	.000
Rollin Wilson	1921	1	4–5–1	.450
Lester Barnard	1922–1923	2	11–5–3	.658
Zach Curlin	1924–1936	13	43–60–14	.427
Allyn McKeen	1937–1938	2	13–6	.684
Cecil C. Humphreys	1939–1941	3	14–15	.483
Charlie Jamerson	1942	1	2–7	.222
Ralph Hatley	1947–1957	11	59–43–5	.575
Billy J. Murphy	1958–1971	14	91–44–1	.673
Fred Pancoast	1972–1974	3	20–12–1	.621
Richard Williamson	1975–1980	6	31–35	.470
Rex Dockery	1981–1983	3	8–24–1	.258
Rey Dempsey	1984–1985	2	7–12–3	.386
Charlie Bailey	1986–1988	3	12–20–1	.379
Chuck Stobart	1989–1994	6	29–36–1	.447
Rip Scherer	1995–2000	6	22–44	.333
Tommy West	2001–2009	9	49–61	.445
Larry Porter	2010–2011	2	3–21	.125
Justin Fuente	2012–2015	4	26–24	.520
Mike Norvell	2016–2019	4	38–15	.717
Ryan Silverfield	2019–2025	7	50–25	.667
Charles Huff	2026—present	1	0–0	–

== Rivalries ==
=== Arkansas State ===
The series with bordering-state rival Arkansas State dates to 1914. Memphis leads 31–24–5 with the last game played on September 17, 2022.

=== Cincinnati ===
The series with Cincinnati dates to 1966. Memphis leads 23–14 with the last game played in 2020.

=== Louisville ===
The hatred between the Louisville Cardinals and the Memphis Tigers runs strong. The Tigers' rivalry with bordering-state opponent Louisville dates back to 1948. Louisville leads 24–19 with the last game played in 2013. Both teams were at once in the American Athletic Conference Football for 1 year until Louisville joined the Atlantic Coastal Conference in 2014. Both teams are better known for their rivalry on the basketball court than on the football field, but both schools share the same hatred between each other in any sport including football.

=== Ole Miss ===
The Tigers' football rivalry with regional and bordering-state opponent Ole Miss dates to 1921. Ole Miss leads 47–12–2 through the 2019 season. Ole Miss is Memphis' oldest football rivalry and is tied with Southern Miss as Memphis' most-played football opponent all-time while Memphis is Ole Miss' most-played football opponent who has never been a member of the Southeastern Conference (SEC).

=== Southern Miss ===
The Memphis Tigers' football rivalry with bordering-state opponent Southern Miss is officially named the Black and Blue Bowl and dates back to 1935. Southern Miss is tied with Ole Miss as Memphis' most-played football opponent all-time. Southern Miss leads the all-time series 40–22–1 with the last game played in 2012. The annual series between the Tigers and Golden Eagles ended after Memphis joined the American Athletic Conference in 2013. The rivalry will be renewed in 2027 and 2030 as a nonconference game after more than a decade of dormancy.

=== UAB ===
Memphis and bordering-state opponent UAB annually play a football rivalry game called “The Battle of the Bones” where the winning team receives a 100 lb bronze statue of a rack of ribs. This pays homage to both school's cities prominence in BBQ. The rivalry temporarily ended when Memphis moved to the American Athletic Conference after the 2012 season. UAB leads the all-time series 10–5, but Memphis won the last matchup which allowed the Tigers to keep the Bones Trophy. The rivalry was rekindled in 2023 when UAB joined Memphis in the American Conference.

== Facilities ==
=== Simmons Bank Liberty Stadium ===
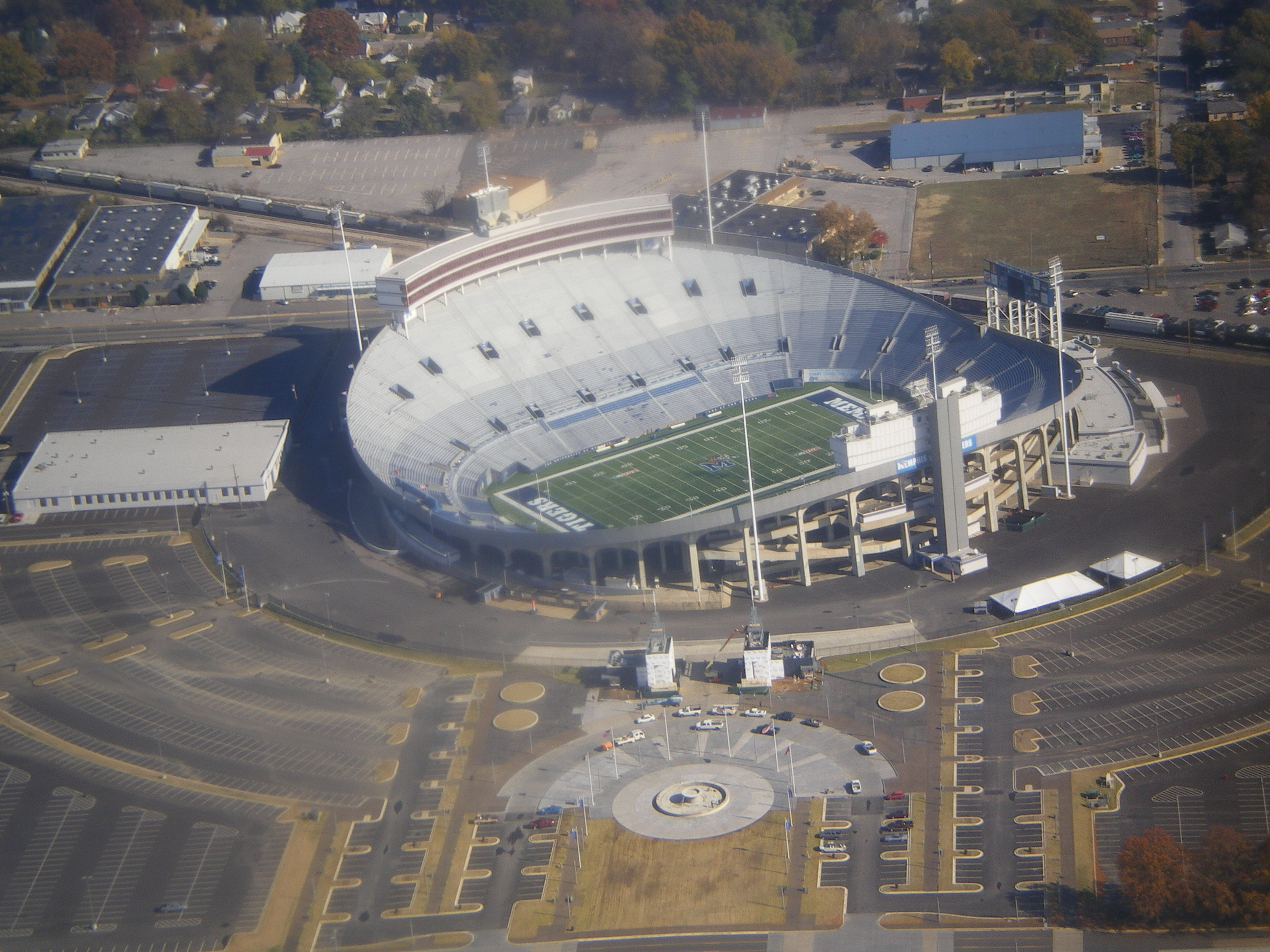
Simmons Bank Liberty Stadium, home of Memphis Tigers football

Simmons Bank Liberty Stadium, originally Memphis Memorial Stadium, is the site of the annual AutoZone Liberty Bowl, and is the home of the Memphis Tigers football team. It has also been the host of several attempts at professional sports in the city, as well as other local football games and other gatherings. The stadium was originally built as Memphis Memorial Stadium in 1965 for $3 million, as a part of the Mid-South Fairgrounds, then home to one of the South's most popular fairs, but now conducted in neighboring Desoto County, Mississippi. The fairgrounds also included the now-defunct Mid-South Coliseum (formerly the city's major indoor venue) as well as the now-closed Libertyland amusement park, which has been demolished and replaced with a disc golf course. It was dedicated as a memorial to the citizens of Memphis who had served in World War I, World War II, and the Korean War. The facility was built partially as a way to bring the Liberty Bowl to a permanent home in Memphis (the game had started in Philadelphia, but because of poor attendance as a northern bowl, it left the city, playing one year in Atlantic City before settling in Memphis). The game was such a success for Memphis that the stadium was renamed Liberty Bowl Memorial Stadium in 1976. As originally built, the stadium was lopsided, with the southwest side being taller than the northeast side. A 1987 expansion brought it to its current, balanced configuration, although with a much greater hospitality building topping the northeast section. Its design is similar to that of old Tampa Stadium ("The Big Sombrero"), with the endzone grandstands being much shorter than the sidelines. The field, which had been natural grass since its inception, was replaced with a FieldTurf surface before the 2005 season; this was subsequently replaced with the modern version of AstroTurf. The stadium is designed in such a way that all of its seats have a relatively good view of most of the playing surface. This is due primarily to two design factors. The stands are relatively steep for a one-tier, true bowl stadium. Also, there is little space between the side and end lines of the playing surface and the stands. In December 1983, the playing field was renamed Rex Dockery Field in honor of Rex Dockery, a former Memphis Tigers football coach who died in a plane crash.

== Traditions ==
=== Tiger Lane ===
"Tiger Lane" refers to the pre-game tailgating spots for Memphis Tigers football fans. It is equipped with electrical hookups at each spot, trees, grassy areas and all pre-game tailgating activities. Tiger Lane stretches over 550 yards from East Parkway in mid-town Memphis amidst parking lots towards the northwest side of the Simmons Bank Liberty Stadium.

=== Tiger Walk ===
About two and a half hours prior to kickoff at home games, Tiger fans line up for the "Tiger Walk": the football team and coaching staff parade over Tiger Lane and into the stadium tunnel with the fans and cheerleaders cheering them on to victory. The tradition involves the Mighty Sound of the South marching band, thousands of fans and the University of Memphis cheer and pom-pom squads. After the team has passed by, the Tiger cheerleaders lead the fans in the "Tiger Spellout", "T-I-G-E-R-S."

=== Motto ===
The football team's motto is "Let's Go Tigers Go, Go On To Victory".

=== School colors ===
The University of Memphis' official school colors of Blue and Gray were selected by the students in the early 1900s. The colors were chosen in an effort to show unity in a nation that was still recovering from the effects of the Civil War. The student body thought that by picking the colors of the North and the South, the school would show a togetherness among all students. Typically, the team wears blue jerseys paired with gray or white pants at home games, and white jerseys with blue and gray numbering or trim at away games.

== Retired numbers ==
Memphis has retired numbers for seven players in their history. Charles Greenhill only played one season at Memphis, but his number was retired after he died in a plane crash that also took the life of head coach Rex Dockery.

Memphis Tigers retired numbers
No.	Player	Pos.	Tenure	Ref.
8	Charles Greenhill	DB	1983	
20	DeAngelo Williams	RB	2002–2005	
30	Dave Casinelli	FB	1960–1963	
59	Danton Barto	LB	1990–1993	
64	John Bramlett	LB	1959–1962	
79	Harry Schuh	OT	1962–1964	
83	Isaac Bruce	WR	1992–1993	

== Memphis Tigers awards and honors ==
Pro Football Hall of Fame

- Isaac Bruce – WR (1992–1993); HoF Class of 2020

College Football Hall of Fame

- Allyn McKeen – Head Coach (1937–1938); HoF Class of 1991
- Billy Jack "Spook" Murphy – Head Coach (1958–1971); HoF Class of 2022
- DeAngelo Williams – RB (2002–2005); HoF Class of 2023

National Coach of the Year

- 1963 – Billy Jack "Spook" Murphy (Detroit News)

Lou Groza Award

- 1992 – Joe Allison

Ray Guy Award

- 2013 – Tom Hornsey

Paul Warfield Trophy

- 2017 – Anthony Miller

Jim Brown Award

- 2018 – Darrell Henderson

William V. Campbell Trophy

- 2020 – Brady White

College Football All-America Team selections

Consensus All-Americans listed in bold

- 1963 – Charles Brooks, E (FN)
- 1963 – Harry Schuh, T (NEA-1)
- 1964 – Harry Schuh, T (AFCA-2, Time)
- 1969 – David Berrong, DB (AP-3, CP-3)
- 1971 – Mike Stark, T (AP-3)
- 1976 – Eric Harris, DB (CFN)
- 1976 – Bob Rush, C (NEA-2, TSN)
- 1977 – Keith Simpson, DB (EA-1, TSN)
- **1992 – Joe Allison**, K (Consensus)
- 2004 – DeAngelo Williams, RB (PFW)
- 2005 – DeAngelo Williams, RB (AFCA, WCFF)
- **2013 – Tom Hornsey**, P (Consensus)
- 2015 – Jake Elliott, K (AP-2, USAT, WCFF-2, ESPN)
- **2017 – Anthony Miller**, WR (Consensus)
- 2017 – Tony Pollard, KR (FWAA, WCFF, CFN, Athlon)
- **2018 – Darrell Henderson** RB (Consensus), KR (TSN)

American Athletic Conference Awards

- 2013 – Tom Hornsey, P – Special Teams Player of the Year
- 2014 – Tank Jakes, LB – Defensive Player of the Year
- 2014 – Jake Elliott, K – Special Teams Player of the Year
- 2014 – Justin Fuente – Coach of the Year
- 2015 – Jake Elliott, K – Special Teams Player of the Year
- 2016 – Tony Pollard, KR – Special Teams Player of the Year
- 2017 – Tony Pollard, KR – Special Teams Player of the Year
- 2017 – T. J. Carter, CB – Rookie of the Year
- 2019 – Antonio Gibson, KR – Special Teams Player of the Year
- 2019 – Kenneth Gainwell, RB – Rookie of the Year

== Future non-conference opponents ==
Announced schedules as of August 25, 2026.

2026	2027	2028	2029	2030	2031	2034
at UNLV	Toledo	at Toledo	at Arkansas State	Boise State	at Boise State	at Mississippi State
Arkansas State	at Arkansas State	at Arkansas	UNLV	at Southern Miss		
at Boise State	Southern Miss	Arkansas State		at Arkansas		
UT Martin	at Middle Tennessee					
