= List of Memphis Tigers football seasons =

The following is the list of Memphis Tigers football seasons by Memphis Tigers football program.

== Seasons ==
Season	Coach	Conference	Season results				Conference results			Bowls
Season	Coach	Conference	Conference Finish	Wins	Losses	Ties	Wins	Losses	Ties	Bowls
Memphis Tigers
1912	Clyde H. Wilson	Independent		1	2	1				
1913	Clyde H. Wilson	Independent		1	2	0				
1914	Clyde H. Wilson	Independent		3	5	0				
1915	Clyde H. Wilson	Independent		4	3	0				
1916	Tom Shea	Independent		2	3	1				
1917	V. M. Campbell	Independent		3	2	0				
1918	John Childerson	Independent		2	4	0				
1919	V. M. Campbell	Independent		3	4	0				
1920	Elmore George	Independent		0	5	0				
1921	Rollin Wilson	Independent		4	5	1				
1922	Lester Barnard	Independent		5	2	3				
1923	Lester Barnard	Independent		6	3	0				
1924	Zach Curlin	Independent		1	7	1				
1925	Zach Curlin	Independent		0	7	1				
1926	Zach Curlin	Independent		1	8	0				
1927	Zach Curlin	Independent		5	3	1				
1928	Zach Curlin	Mississippi Valley Conference		5	3	2	3	1	1	
1929	Zach Curlin	Mississippi Valley Conference		8	0	2	5	0	1	
1930	Zach Curlin	Mississippi Valley Conference		6	3	1	3	1	0	
1931	Zach Curlin	Mississippi Valley Conference		2	5	2	2	2	1	
1932	Zach Curlin	Mississippi Valley Conference		4	5	0	2	2	0	
1933	Zach Curlin	Mississippi Valley Conference		7	1	1	1	0	0	
1934	Zach Curlin	Mississippi Valley Conference		3	3	2	1	0	0	
1935	Zach Curlin	SIAA		1	6	1	1	2	1	
1936	Zach Curlin	SIAA		0	9	0	0	5	0	
1937	Allyn McKeen	SIAA		3	6	0	1	6	0	
1938	Allyn McKeen	SIAA		10	0	0	5	0	0	
1939	Cecil C. Humphreys	SIAA		3	8	0	3	3	0	
1940	Cecil C. Humphreys	SIAA		5	5	0	4	3	0	
1941	Cecil C. Humphreys	SIAA		6	3	0	3	2	0	
1942	Charlie Jamerson	SIAA		2	7	0	1	2	0	
1943	Memphis State did not play football during the 1943 through 1946 seasons because of World War II									
1944	Memphis State did not play football during the 1943 through 1946 seasons because of World War II									
1945	Memphis State did not play football during the 1943 through 1946 seasons because of World War II									
1946	Memphis State did not play football during the 1943 through 1946 seasons because of World War II									
1947	Ralph Hatley	Independent		6	2	1				
1948	Ralph Hatley	Independent		6	5	0				
1949	Ralph Hatley	Independent		9	1	0				
1950	Ralph Hatley	Independent		9	2	0				
1951	Ralph Hatley	Independent		5	3	0				
1952	Ralph Hatley	Independent		2	7	0				
1953	Ralph Hatley	Independent		6	4	0				
1954	Ralph Hatley	Independent		3	4	3				
1955	Ralph Hatley	Independent		2	7	0				
1956	Ralph Hatley	Independent		5	4	1				W Burley Bowl
1957	Ralph Hatley	Independent		6	4	0				
1958	Billy J. Murphy	Independent		4	5	0				
1959	Billy J. Murphy	Independent		6	4	0				
1960	Billy J. Murphy	Independent		8	2	0				
1961	Billy J. Murphy	Independent		8	2	0				
1962	Billy J. Murphy	Independent		8	1	0				
1963	Billy J. Murphy	Independent		9	0	1				
1964	Billy J. Murphy	Independent		5	4	0				
1965	Billy J. Murphy	Independent		5	5	0				
1966	Billy J. Murphy	Independent		7	2	0				
1967	Billy J. Murphy	Independent		6	3	0				
1968	Billy J. Murphy	Missouri Valley	1st	6	4	0	5	0	0	
1969	Billy J. Murphy	Missouri Valley	1st	8	2	0	5	0	0	
1970	Billy J. Murphy	Missouri Valley	3rd	6	4	0	2	2	0	
1971	Billy J. Murphy	Missouri Valley	T–1st	5	6	0	4	1	0	W Pasadena Bowl
1972	Fred Pancoast	Missouri Valley	5th	5	5	1	2	2	0	
1973	Fred Pancoast	Division I Independent		8	3	0				
1974	Fred Pancoast	Division I Independent		7	4	0				
1975	Richard Williamson	Division I Independent		7	4	0				
1976	Richard Williamson	Division I Independent		7	4	0				
1977	Richard Williamson	Division I Independent		6	5	0				
1978	Richard Williamson	Division I Independent		4	7	0				
1979	Richard Williamson	Division I Independent		5	6	0				
1980	Richard Williamson	Division I Independent		2	9	0				
1981	Rex Dockery	Division I Independent		1	10	0				
1982	Rex Dockery	Division I Independent		1	10	0				
1983	Rex Dockery	Division I Independent		6	4	1				
1984	Rey Dempsey	Division I Independent		5	5	1				
1985	Rey Dempsey	Division I Independent		2	7	2				
1986	Charlie Bailey	Division I Independent		1	10	0				
1987	Charlie Bailey	Division I Independent		5	5	1				
1988	Charlie Bailey	Division I Independent		6	5	0				
1989	Chuck Stobart	Division I Independent		2	9	0				
1990	Chuck Stobart	Division I Independent		4	6	1				
1991	Chuck Stobart	Division I Independent		5	6	0				
1992	Chuck Stobart	Division I Independent		6	5	0				
1993	Chuck Stobart	Division I Independent		6	5	0				
1994	Chuck Stobart	Division I Independent		6	5	0				
1995	Rip Scherer	Division I Independent		3	8	0				
1996	Rip Scherer	Conference USA	T-3rd	4	7		2	3		
1997	Rip Scherer	Conference USA	T-4th	4	7		2	4		
1998	Rip Scherer	Conference USA	T-7th	2	9		1	5		
1999	Rip Scherer	Conference USA	T-2nd	5	6		4	2		
2000	Rip Scherer	Conference USA	T-7th	4	7		2	5		
2001	Tommy West	Conference USA	7th	5	6		3	4		
2002	Tommy West	Conference USA	9th	3	9		2	6		
2003	Tommy West	Conference USA	T–3rd	9	4		5	3		W New Orleans Bowl
2004	Tommy West	Conference USA	T–2nd	8	4		5	3		L GMAC Bowl
2005	Tommy West	Conference USA	T–2nd (East)	7	5		5	3		W Motor City Bowl
2006	Tommy West	Conference USA	6th (East)	2	10		1	7		
2007	Tommy West	Conference USA	T–2nd (East)	7	6		6	2		L New Orleans Bowl
2008	Tommy West	Conference USA	T–2nd (East)	6	7		4	4		L St. Petersburg Bowl
2009	Tommy West	Conference USA	6th (East)	2	10		1	7		
2010	Larry Porter	Conference USA	6th (East)	1	11		0	8		
2011	Larry Porter	Conference USA	6th (East)	2	10		1	7		
2012	Justin Fuente	Conference USA	T–3rd (East)	4	8		4	4		
2013	Justin Fuente	American Athletic Conference	T–9th	3	9		1	7		
2014	Justin Fuente	American Athletic Conference	T–1st	10	3		7	1		W Miami Beach Bowl
2015	Justin Fuente	American Athletic Conference	3rd (West)	9	4		5	3		L Birmingham Bowl
2016	Mike Norvell	American Athletic Conference	T–3rd (West)	8	5		5	3		L Boca Raton Bowl
2017	Mike Norvell	American Athletic Conference	1st (West)	10	3		7	1		L Liberty Bowl
2018	Mike Norvell	American Athletic Conference	T–1st (West)	8	6		5	3		L Birmingham Bowl
2019	Mike Norvell	American Athletic Conference	T–1st (West)	12	2		7	1		L Cotton Bowl Classic
2020	Ryan Silverfield	American Athletic Conference	T–3rd	8	3		5	3		W Montgomery Bowl
2021	Ryan Silverfield	American Athletic Conference	T–7th	6	6		3	5		Hawaii Bowl Canceled
2022	Ryan Silverfield	American Athletic Conference	T–8th	7	6		3	5		W First Responder Bowl
2023	Ryan Silverfield	American Athletic Conference	T–4th	10	3		6	2		W Liberty Bowl
2024	Ryan Silverfield	American Athletic Conference	T–3rd	11	2		6	2		W Frisco Bowl
2025	Ryan Silverfield	American Athletic Conference	T–6th	8	5		4	4		L Gasparilla Bowl

== See also ==
- Memphis Tigers football
