= 1928 Murray State Thoroughbreds football team =

American college football season

1928 Murray State Thoroughbreds football

MVC champion
- Conference: Mississippi Valley Conference
- Record: 9–0–1 (6–0 MVC)
- Head coach: Carlisle Cutchin (4th season)
- Captain: John Miller
- Home stadium: College Field

1928 Mississippi Valley Conference football standings
	Conf.					Overall
Team	W		L		T	W		L		T
Murray State $	6	–	0	–	0	9	–	0	–	1
West Tennessee State Teachers	4	–	1	–	1	5	–	3	–	2
Bethel (TN)	3	–	1	–	2	4	–	3	–	2
Lambuth	3	–	3	–	0	4	–	5	–	0
Delta State	2	–	2	–	0	6	–	2	–	0
Tennessee Junior	2	–	4	–	0	2	–	6	–	0
Jonesboro College	1	–	3	–	1	1	–	6	–	1
Will Mayfield	1	–	3	–	0	1	–	7	–	1
Sunflower Junior	0	–	2	–	0	0	–	2	–	0
Bethel (KY)	0	–	3	–	0	0	–	6	–	0
$ – Conference champion

The 1928 Murray State Thoroughbreds team represented Murray State Normal School and Teachers College—now known as Murray State University—as a member of the Mississippi Valley Conference (MVC) during the 1928 college football season. In their fourth season under head coach Carlisle Cutchin, the Thoroughbreds compiled an overall record of 9–0–1 with a mark of 6–0 in conference play, winning the MVC title.

== Schedule ==
Date	Time	Opponent	Site	Result	Source
September 28	2:30 p.m.	at Southern Illinois*	Normal Field; Carbondale, IL	T 0–0	
October 5		Cape Girardeau*	Murray, KY	W 12–0	
October 12	3:00 p.m.	Bethel (KY)	Murray, KY	W 39–0	
October 19		Tennessee Junior	Murray, KY	W 34–6	
October 27		at Lambuth	Jackson Athletic Park; Jackson, TN	W 13–0	
November 3		at Middle Tennessee State Teachers*	Murfreesboro, TN	W 14–6	
November 10		State Normal (AL)*	Murray, KY	W 86–0	
November 17	2:30 p.m.	Jonesboro A&M	College Field; Murray, KY	W 71–7	
November 24	2:30 p.m.	at West Tennessee State Teachers	Memorial Field; Memphis, TN	W 40–0	
December 1		Will Mayfield	Murray, KY	W 119–6	
*Non-conference game; All times are in Central time
