= 1929 West Tennessee State Teachers football team =

American college football season

1929 West Tennessee State Teachers football

MVC champion
- Conference: Mississippi Valley Conference
- Record: 8–0–2 (5–0–1 MVC)
- Head coach: Zach Curlin (6th season)
- Captains: Slick Headden; Joe Koch
- Home stadium: Hodges Field, Memorial Field

1929 Mississippi Valley Conference football standings
	Conf.					Overall
Team	W		L		T	W		L		T
West Tennessee State Teachers $	5	–	0	–	1	8	–	0	–	2
Murray State	3	–	1	–	0	5	–	4	–	0
Delta State	2	–	1	–	2	5	–	1	–	2
Lambuth	3	–	2	–	1	4	–	5	–	0
Caruthersville Junior	2	–	2	–	1	2	–	2	–	1
Tennessee Junior	3	–	4	–	0	4	–	4	–	0
Bethel (TN)	2	–	3	–	0	2	–	5	–	0
Will Mayfield	1	–	2	–	0	3	–	4	–	0
Sunflower Junior	0	–	1	–	1	0	–	1	–	1
Jonesboro College	0	–	5	–	0	0	–	6	–	0
$ – Conference champion

The 1929 West Tennessee State Teachers football team was an American football team that represented West Tennessee State Teachers College (now known as the University of Memphis) as a member of the Mississippi Valley Conference during the 1929 college football season. In their sixth season under head coach Zach Curlin, West Tennessee State Teachers compiled an overall record of 8–0–2 with a mark of 5–0–1 in conference play, winning the MVC title.

== Schedule ==
Date	Time	Opponent	Site	Result	Attendance	Source
September 27	8:00 p.m.	Sunflower Junior	Hodges Field; Memphis, TN	W 20–0	1,500	
October 4	8:00 p.m.	Cape Girardeau*	Hodges Field; Memphis, TN	T 0–0		
October 11	8:00 p.m.	Caruthersville Junior	Hodges Field; Memphis, TN	W 26–0		
October 19		at Tennessee Junior	Martin, TN	W 13–2		
October 25	8:00 p.m.	Cumberland (TN)*	Hodges Field; Memphis, TN	W 12–6		
November 1	8:00 p.m.	at Jonesboro A&M*	Kays Field; Jonesboro, AR (rivalry)	W 6–0		
November 8		at Bethel (TN)	McKenzie, TN	W 10–0		
November 15	3:00 p.m.	Delta State^{†}	Memorial Field; Memphis, TN	T 0–0		
November 23		at Murray State	Murray, KY	W 27–13		
November 28	2:00 p.m.	Little Rock*	Memorial Field; Memphis, TN	W 32–6		
*Non-conference game; ^{†}Homecoming; All times are in Central time
