= 1928 West Tennessee State Teachers football team =

American college football season

1928 West Tennessee State Teachers football
- Conference: Mississippi Valley Conference
- Record: 5–3–2 (4–1–1 MVC)
- Head coach: Zach Curlin (5th season)
- Captain: Graham Crawford
- Home stadium: Hodges Field, Memorial Field

1928 Mississippi Valley Conference football standings
	Conf.					Overall
Team	W		L		T	W		L		T
Murray State $	6	–	0	–	0	9	–	0	–	1
West Tennessee State Teachers	4	–	1	–	1	5	–	3	–	2
Bethel (TN)	3	–	1	–	2	4	–	3	–	2
Lambuth	3	–	3	–	0	4	–	5	–	0
Delta State	2	–	2	–	0	6	–	2	–	0
Tennessee Junior	2	–	4	–	0	2	–	6	–	0
Jonesboro College	1	–	3	–	1	1	–	6	–	1
Will Mayfield	1	–	3	–	0	1	–	7	–	1
Sunflower Junior	0	–	2	–	0	0	–	2	–	0
Bethel (KY)	0	–	3	–	0	0	–	6	–	0
$ – Conference champion

The 1928 West Tennessee State Teachers football team was an American football team that represented West Tennessee State Teachers College (now known as the University of Memphis) as a member of the Mississippi Valley Conference (MVC) during the 1928 college football season. In their fifth season under head coach Zach Curlin, West Tennessee State Teachers compiled an overall record of 5–3–2 with a mark of 4–1–1 in conference play, placing second in the MVC.

== Schedule ==
Date	Time	Opponent	Site	Result	Attendance	Source
September 28	3:15 p.m.	Sunflower Junior	Hodges Field; Memphis, TN	W 19–0		
October 6	3:00 p.m.	Tennessee Junior	Memorial Field; Memphis, TN	W 60–0		
October 13		at Delta State	Cleveland, MS	W 12–0		
October 19		at Will Mayfield	Marble Hill, MO	W 34–0		
October 26	3:00 p.m.	Middle Tennessee State Teachers*	Memorial Field; Memphis, TN	T 13–13	2,500	
November 3	2:45 p.m.	Jonesboro A&M*	Hodges Field; Memphis, TN (rivalry)	W 19–14		
November 10	2:30 p.m.	at Southwestern (TN)*	Fargason Field; Memphis, TN	L 0–47	4,000	
November 16		Bethel (TN)	Memorial Field; Memphis, TN	T 0–0		
November 24	2:30 p.m.	Murray State	Memorial Field; Memphis, TN	L 0–40		
November 29		at Cumberland (TN)*	Lebanon, TN	L 0–6		
*Non-conference game; All times are in Central time
