= 1932 West Tennessee State Teachers football team =

American college football season

1932 West Tennessee State Teachers football
- Conference: Mississippi Valley Conference
- Record: 4–5 (2–2 MVC)
- Head coach: Zach Curlin (9th season)
- Captains: Andy Porter; Steve Miska
- Home stadium: Memorial Field

1932 Mississippi Valley Conference football standings
	Conf.					Overall
Team	W		L		T	W		L		T
Bethel (TN) $	5	–	1	–	0	7	–	1	–	0
Tennessee Poly	2	–	0	–	1	4	–	0	–	3
Delta State	3	–	1	–	0	4	–	5	–	0
Sunflower Junior	2	–	1	–	0	2	–	1	–	0
Jonesboro College	2	–	2	–	0	5	–	3	–	0
West Tennessee State Teachers	2	–	2	–	0	4	–	5	–	0
Tennessee Junior	1	–	2	–	2	1	–	4	–	3
Lambuth	1	–	6	–	0	1	–	7	–	0
Freed–Hardeman	0	–	3	–	1	1	–	3	–	1
$ – Conference champion

The 1932 West Tennessee State Teachers football team was an American football team that represented West Tennessee State Teachers College (now known as the University of Memphis) as a member of the Mississippi Valley Conference (MVC) during the 1932 college football season. In their ninth season under head coach Zach Curlin, West Tennessee State Teachers compiled an overall record of 4–5 with mark of 2–2 in conference play, tying for fifth place in the MVC.

== Schedule ==
Date	Time	Opponent	Site	Result	Attendance	Source
October 1	3:00 p.m.	Arkansas College*	Memorial Field; Memphis, TN	W 20–0		
October 8	3:00 p.m.	Bethel (TN)	Memorial Field; Memphis, TN	L 0–6		
October 15		at Tennessee Poly	Cookeville, TN	L 7–24		
October 21		at Cape Girardeau*	Houck Stadium; Cape Girardeau, MO	W 7–0	3,500	
November 2	2:45 p.m.	Arkansas State*	Memorial Field; Memphis, TN (rivalry)	L 6–12		
November 5	2:30 p.m.	Middle Tennessee State Teachers*	Memorial Field; Memphis, TN	L 0–6		
November 11		at Delta State	Cleveland, MS	W 13–0		
November 19	2:30 p.m.	Tennessee Junior	Memorial Field; Memphis, TN	W 6-0		
November 24	2:00 p.m.	Murray State*	Memorial Field; Memphis, TN	L 2–6		
*Non-conference game; All times are in Central time
