= 1931 West Tennessee State Teachers football team =

American college football season

1931 West Tennessee State Teachers football
- Conference: Mississippi Valley Conference
- Record: 2–5–2 (1–2–2 MVC)
- Head coach: Zach Curlin (8th season)
- Captain: Sam Johnson
- Home stadium: Memorial Field

The 1931 West Tennessee State Teachers football team was an American football team that represented West Tennessee State Teachers College (now known as the University of Memphis) as a member of the Mississippi Valley Conference (MVC) during the 1931 college football season. In their eighth season under head coach Zach Curlin, West Tennessee State Teachers compiled an overall record of 2–5–2 with a mark of 1–2–2 in conference play.

== Schedule ==
Date	Time	Opponent	Site	Result	Source
October 3	3:15 p.m.	Lambuth	Memorial Field; Memphis, TN	W 13–0	
October 9		at Bethel (TN)	McKenzie, TN	T 0–0	
October 16		at Caruthersville Junior	High School field; Caruthersville, MO	T 0–0	
October 24		Tennessee Poly	Memorial Field; Memphis, TN	L 0–13	
October 30		at Arkansas State*	Kays Field; Jonesboro, AR (rivalry)	L 6–14	
November 7		at Middle Tennessee State Teachers*	Murfreesboro, TN	L 0–15	
November 14	2:30 p.m.	Delta State	Memorial Field; Memphis, TN	L 6–32	
November 20		Bethel (KY)*	Memorial Field; Memphis, TN	W 6–0	
November 27		at Murray State*	College Field; Murray, KY	L 2–28	
*Non-conference game; All times are in Central time
