= Mississippi Valley Conference (college) =

The Mississippi Valley Conference was an intercollegiate athletic conference that existed from 1928 to 1934. The league had members in the states of Arkansas, Kentucky, Mississippi, Missouri, and Tennessee.

The Mississippi Valley Conference was formed on December 10, 1927, in Memphis, Tennessee, with ten charter members:

- Bethel College in Russellville, Kentucky
- Bethel College—now known as Bethel University—in McKenzie, Tennessee
- Delta State Teachers College—now known as Delta State University—in Cleveland, Mississippi
- Jonesboro College in Jonesboro, Arkansas
- Lambuth College—now known as Lambuth University—in Jackson, Tennessee
- Murray State Teachers College—now known as Murray State University—in Murray, Kentucky
- Sunflower Junior College—now known as Mississippi Delta Community College—in Moorhead, Mississippi
- University of Tennessee Junior College—now known as the University of Tennessee at Martin—in Martin, Tennessee
- West Tennessee State Teachers College—now known as the University of Memphis—in Memphis, Tennessee
- Will Mayfield College in Marble Hill, Missouri

Three more schools were admitted to the conference in December 1930:

- Freed–Hardeman College—now known as Freed–Hardeman University—in Henderson, Tennessee
- Middle Tennessee State Teachers College—now known as Middle Tennessee State University—in Murfreesboro, Tennessee
- Tennessee Polytechnic Institute—now known as Tennessee Tech—Cookeville, Tennessee

Murray State withdrew from the conference in January 1931, after the school was admitted to the Southern Intercollegiate Athletic Association (SIAA).

== Football champions ==
- 1928 – Murray State
- 1929 – West Tennessee State Teachers
- 1930 – West Tennessee State Teachers
- 1931 – Tennessee Poly
- 1932 – Bethel (TN)
- 1933 – Bethel (TN)
- 1934 – Bethel (TN)

== Yearly football standings ==
1928 Mississippi Valley Conference football standings
	Conf.					Overall
Team	W		L		T	W		L		T
Murray State $	6	–	0	–	0	9	–	0	–	1
West Tennessee State Teachers	4	–	1	–	1	5	–	3	–	2
Bethel (TN)	3	–	1	–	2	4	–	3	–	2
Lambuth	3	–	3	–	0	4	–	5	–	0
Delta State	2	–	2	–	0	6	–	2	–	0
Tennessee Junior	2	–	4	–	0	2	–	6	–	0
Jonesboro College	1	–	3	–	1	1	–	6	–	1
Will Mayfield	1	–	3	–	0	1	–	7	–	1
Sunflower Junior	0	–	2	–	0	0	–	2	–	0
Bethel (KY)	0	–	3	–	0	0	–	6	–	0
$ – Conference champion

1929 Mississippi Valley Conference football standings
	Conf.					Overall
Team	W		L		T	W		L		T
West Tennessee State Teachers $	5	–	0	–	1	8	–	0	–	2
Murray State	3	–	1	–	0	5	–	4	–	0
Delta State	2	–	1	–	2	5	–	1	–	2
Lambuth	3	–	2	–	1	4	–	5	–	0
Caruthersville Junior	2	–	2	–	1	2	–	2	–	1
Tennessee Junior	3	–	4	–	0	4	–	4	–	0
Bethel (TN)	2	–	3	–	0	2	–	5	–	0
Will Mayfield	1	–	2	–	0	3	–	4	–	0
Sunflower Junior	0	–	1	–	1	0	–	1	–	1
Jonesboro College	0	–	5	–	0	0	–	6	–	0
$ – Conference champion

1932 Mississippi Valley Conference football standings
	Conf.					Overall
Team	W		L		T	W		L		T
Bethel (TN) $	5	–	1	–	0	7	–	1	–	0
Tennessee Poly	2	–	0	–	1	4	–	0	–	3
Delta State	3	–	1	–	0	4	–	5	–	0
Sunflower Junior	2	–	1	–	0	2	–	1	–	0
Jonesboro College	2	–	2	–	0	5	–	3	–	0
West Tennessee State Teachers	2	–	2	–	0	4	–	5	–	0
Tennessee Junior	1	–	2	–	2	1	–	4	–	3
Lambuth	1	–	6	–	0	1	–	7	–	0
Freed–Hardeman	0	–	3	–	1	1	–	3	–	1
$ – Conference champion

1933 Mississippi Valley Conference football standings
	Conf.					Overall
Team	W		L		T	W		L		T
West Tennessee State Teachers	3	–	0	–	0	7	–	1	–	1
Sunflower Junior	2	–	1	–	0	2	–	1	–	0
Bethel (TN) $	3	–	2	–	0	5	–	4	–	0
Tennessee Poly	1	–	1	–	0	4	–	4	–	0
Lambuth	2	–	3	–	1	2	–	5	–	1
Delta State	1	–	2	–	0	2	–	7	–	0
Freed–Hardeman	0	–	3	–	1	0	–	3	–	1
$ – Conference champion

1934 Mississippi Valley Conference football standings
	Conf.					Overall
Team	W		L		T	W		L		T
Bethel (TN) $	6	–	0	–	0	7	–	1	–	0
West Tennessee State Teachers	1	–	0	–	0	3	–	3	–	2
Tennessee Junior	2	–	1	–	0	7	–	1	–	0
Freed–Hardeman	2	–	2	–	0	2	–	3	–	0
Delta State	2	–	3	–	0	2	–	6	–	1
Sunflower Junior	1	–	2	–	1	1	–	3	–	1
Lambuth	1	–	4	–	1	1	–	8	–	1
Northwest Mississippi	0	–	3	–	0	0	–	3	–	0
$ – Conference champion

== See also ==
- List of defunct college football conferences
