= Jonesboro A&M Gorillas football, 1920–1929 =

College football seasons

The Jonesboro A&M Gorillas football program from 1920 to 1929 represented Arkansas State University—known as First District Agricultural School prior to 1925 and First District Agricultural and Mechanical College thereafter—in its second decades of college football competition, competing as a junior college. The team was known as the Jonesboro Aggies at the outset of the decade, and took on the Gorillas nickname in 1925.

== 1920 ==
1920 Jonesboro Aggies football
- Conference: Independent
- Record: 4–3
- Head coach: Foy Hammons (2nd season)
- Home stadium: Kays Field

The 1920 Jonesboro Aggies football team represented the First District Agricultural School—now known as Arkansas State University—as an independent during the 1920 college football season. Led by Foy Hammons in his second and final season as head coach, the Aggies compiled a record of 4–3. The team played home games at Kays Field in Jonesboro, Arkansas.

=== Schedule ===
Date	Opponent	Site	Result	Source
October 2	at Ole Miss	Hemingway Stadium; Oxford, MS	L 0–33	
October 11	West Tennessee Normal	Kays Field; Jonesboro, AR (rivalry)	W 13–0	
October 23	at Arkansas College	Fair Grounds; Batesville, AR	L 12–19	
October 29	at Ouachita Baptist	A. U. Williams Field; Arkadelphia, AR	L 0–27	
November 11	at Brinkley High School	Brinkley, AR	W 61–0	
November 25	at Union (TN)	Jackson, TN	W 13–6	
	Camp Pike	Jonesboro, AR	W 18–12	

== 1921 ==
1921 Jonesboro Aggies football
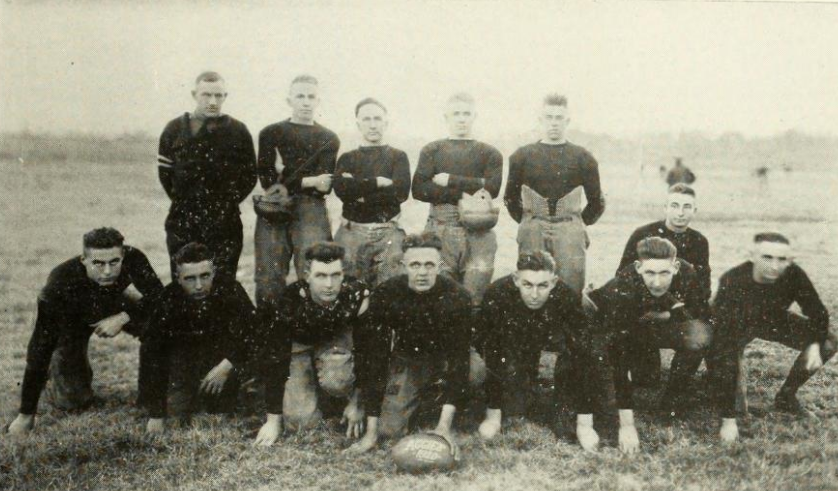
- Conference: Independent
- Record: 3–2–1
- Head coach: Tom Dandelet (1st season)
- Home stadium: Kays Field

The 1921 Jonesboro Aggies football team represented the First District Agricultural School—now known as Arkansas State University—as an independent during the 1921 college football season. Led by first-year head coach Tom Dandelet, the Aggies compiled a record of 3–2–1. The team played home games at Kays Field in Jonesboro, Arkansas.

Dandelet had played football and basketball at the College of St. Thomas in Saint Paul, Minnesota and Valparaiso University. He was hired as athletic director as Jonesboro in the summer of 1921.

=== Schedule ===
Date	Opponent	Site	Result	Attendance	Source
September 30	Arkansas College	Kays Field; Jonesboro, AR	W 14–7		
October 14	Little Rock	Kays Field; Jonesboro, AR	L 0–13		
October 28	Tennessee Docs	Jonesboro, AR	Cancelled		
November 4	Bethel (TN)	Jonesboro, AR	W 7–0		
November 11	West Tennessee State Normal	Kays Field; Jonesboro, AR (rivalry)	W 19–0		
November 18	Arkansas State Normal^{†}	Kays Field; Jonesboro, AR	L 7–13		
November 24	at Cape Girardeau Normal	Cape Girardeau, MO	T 0–0	3,000	
^{†}Homecoming

=== Roster ===
Jonesboro Aggies 1921 roster
Guards: John Lytle; Gordon Keller; Tackles: Floyd Cooper; Russell Benson	Center: Vivian Moser; Ends: Vernon Robinson; Doss Thorn	Backs: Clayton Miller; Charles Rush; Clarence Crump; Eldridge McComb (QB); Joe Roddy

== 1922 ==
1922 Jonesboro Aggies football
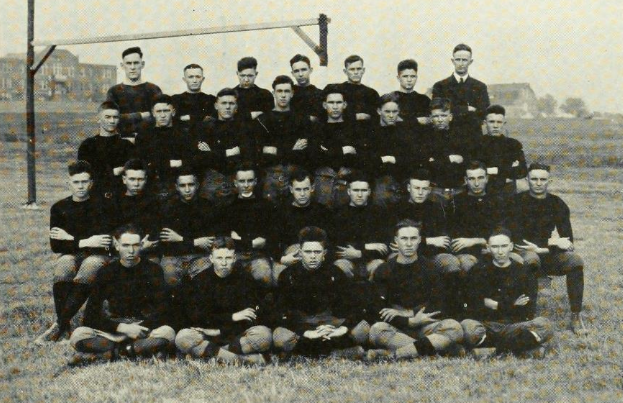
- Conference: Independent
- Record: 0–7
- Head coach: Tom Dandelet (2nd season)
- Captain: Eugene Turcotte
- Home stadium: Kays Field

The 1922 Jonesboro Aggies football team represented the First District Agricultural School—now known as Arkansas State University—as an independent during the 1922 college football season. Led by second-year head coach Tom Dandelet, the Aggies compiled a record of 0–7. The team played home games at Kays Field in Jonesboro, Arkansas.

=== Schedule ===
Date	Time	Opponent	Site	Result	Source
October 6		Memphis Technical High School	Kays Field; Jonesboro, AR	Cancelled	
October 13		at Arkansas College	Batesville, AR	L 0–51	
October 20		at Arkansas State Normal	Conway, AR	L 0–82	
November 3		Russellville	Kays Field; Jonesboro, AR	L 0–69	
November 11	3:00 p.m.	Monticello Aggies	Kays Field; Jonesboro, AR	L 0–42	
November 17	3:00 p.m.	Little Rock	Kays Field; Jonesboro, AR	L 0–40	
November 24		at West Tennessee State Normal	Russwood Park; Memphis, TN (rivalry)	L 0–68	
November 30		at Cape Girardeau Normal	Cape Girardeau, MO	L 0–51	

=== Roster ===
Jonesboro Aggies 1922 roster
Guards: Leonard Reid; Wayne Watkins; Tackles: Joel Blackford; Floyd Cooper	Center: Frank Matthews; Ends: Burl Thompson; Doss Thorn	Backs: Richard Hiett; Herbert Schwartz; Carl "Dutch" Reischling; Eugene Turcotte (QB)

== 1923 ==
1923 Jonesboro Aggies football
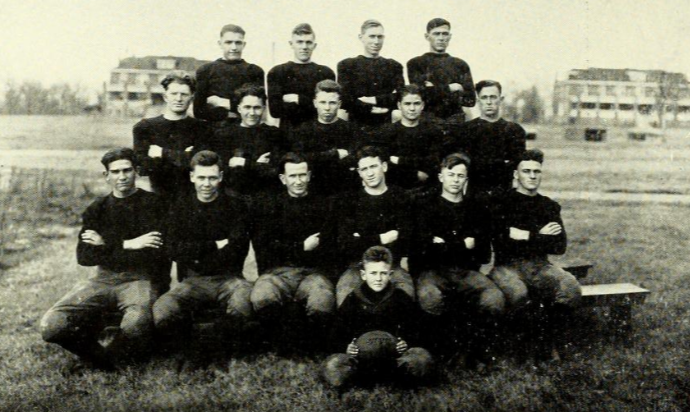
- Conference: Independent
- Record: 0–6–1
- Head coach: Tom Dandelet (3rd season)
- Captain: Richard Hiett
- Home stadium: Kays Field

The 1923 Jonesboro Aggies football team represented the First District Agricultural School—now known as Arkansas State University—as an independent during the 1923 college football season. Led by Tom Dandelet in his third and final season as head coach, the Aggies compiled a record of 0–6–1. The team played home games at Kays Field in Jonesboro, Arkansas.

=== Schedule ===
Date	Time	Opponent	Site	Result	Source
September 29		Jonesboro A&M alumni	Kays Field; Jonesboro, AR	T 0–0	
October 6	3:00 p.m.	at Saint Louis	High School Field; St. Louis, MO	L 0–39	
October 19	3:30 p.m.	Arkansas State Normal	Kays Field; Jonesboro, AR	L 0–40	
October 27		West Tennessee State Normal	Kay Field; Jonesboro, AR (rivalry)	L 0–6	
November 2		at Monticello Aggies	Monticello, AR	L 0–27	
November 9		Arkansas College	Kays Field; Jonesboro, AR	L 0–46	
November 16		at Arkansas College	Little Rock, AR	Cancelled	
November 29		at Cape Girardeau	Cape Girardeau, MO	L 0–6	
All times are in Central time

=== Roster ===
Jonesboro Aggies 1923 roster
Guards: James Young; Haron Thompson; Tackles: Gilbert Taylor; Edgar McDaniel; Nelson Ladd; Lytle Baber	Center: Elmo French; Ends: James "Boob" Martin; Okel Oldham; Lem Dannen	Backs: Charles Shoffner; Herbert Schwartz (QB); Carl "Dutch" Reischling; Wayne Watkins; Vance Fendin (QB); Richard Hiett

=== Gallery ===
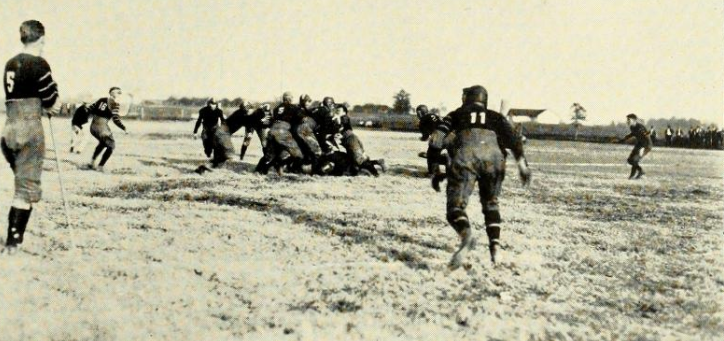

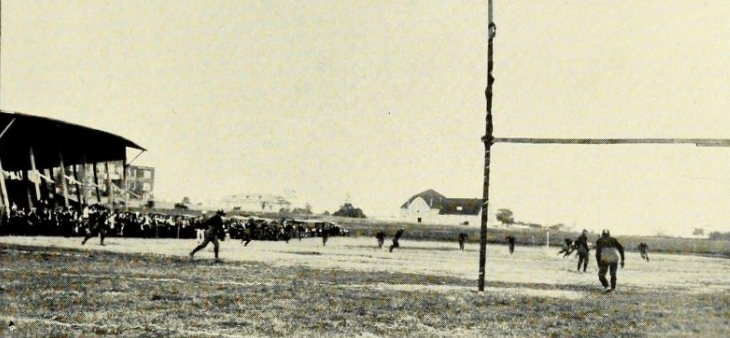

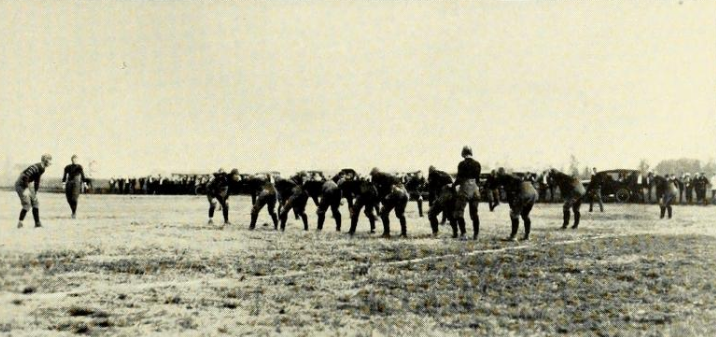

== 1924 ==
1924 Jonesboro Aggies football
- Conference: Independent
- Record: 4–4
- Head coach: Basil Stanley (1st season)
- Home stadium: Kays Field

The 1924 Jonesboro Aggies football team represented the First District Agricultural School—now known as Arkansas State University—as an independent during the 1924 college football season. Led by Basil Stanley in his first and only season as head coach, the Aggies compiled a record of 4–4. The team played home games at Kays Field in Jonesboro, Arkansas.

=== Schedule ===
Date	Opponent	Site	Result	Source
September 20	Jonesboro A&M alumni	Kays Field; Jonesboro, AR	W 24–0	
September 27	at Will Mayfield	Marble Hill, MO	W 12–0	
October 4	at Ole Miss	Hemingway Stadium; Oxford, MS	L 7–10	
October 10	at Arkansas State Normal	Conway, AR	L 0–14	
October 24	at Magnolia A&M	Magnolia, AR	W 33–0	
November 11	Monticello Aggies	Kays Field; Jonesboro, AR	W 19–12	
November 20	at Arkansas College	Batesville, AR	L 0–7	
November 27	at Cape Girardeau	Cape Girardeau, MO	L 0–13	

== 1925 ==
1925 Jonesboro A&M Gorillas football
- Conference: Independent
- Record: 4–3–1
- Head coach: Herbert Schwartz (1st season)
- Home stadium: Kays Field

The 1925 Jonesboro A&M Gorillas football team, also called the Aggies, represented First District Agricultural and Mechanical College—now known as Arkansas State University—as an independent during the 1925 college football season. Led by first-year head coach Herbert Schwartz, the Aggies compiled a record of 4–3–1. The team played home games at Kays Field in Jonesboro, Arkansas.

=== Schedule ===
Date	Time	Opponent	Site	Result	Source
September 26		at Ole Miss	Hemingway Stadium; Oxford, MS	L 0–53	
October 9		West Tennessee State Teachers	Kays Field; Jonesboro, AR (rivalry)	W 19–0	
October 17	2:30: p.m.	at Southwestern (TN)	Fargason Field; Memphis, TN	L 6–14	
October 23		at Hendrix	Young Memorial Stadium; Conway, AR	L 0–48	
October 31		Magnolia A&M	Kays Field; Jonesboro, AR	W 27–0	
November 11		Arkansas State Teachers^{†}	Kays Field; Jonesboro, AR	W 12–6	
November 20		Monticello Aggies		W 1–0 (forfeit)	
November 26		at Arkansas College	Batesville, AR	T 0–0	
^{†}Homecoming

== 1926 ==
1926 Jonesboro A&M Gorillas football
- Conference: Independent
- Record: 4–3–1
- Head coach: Herbert Schwartz (2nd season)
- Home stadium: Kays Field

The 1926 Jonesboro A&M Gorillas football team represented Jonesboro A&M College—now known as Arkansas State University—as an independent during the 1926 college football season. In their second year under head coach Herbert Schwartz, the Aggies compiled a record of 4–3–1. The team played home games at Kays Field in Jonesboro, Arkansas.

=== Schedule ===
Date	Time	Opponent	Site	Result	Attendance	Source
September 25		at Ole Miss	Hemingway Stadium; Oxford, MS	L 0–28		
October 9	2:30 p.m.	at West Tennessee State Teachers	Memorial Field; Memphis, TN (rivalry)	W 7–0	1,000	
October 15		at Magnolia A&M	Smith Field; Magnolia, AR	L 0–20		
October 22		at Southern Illinois	Carbondale, IL	L 0–10		
October 29	3:15 p.m.	Lambuth	Kays Field; Jonesboro, AR	W 13–0		
November 11	10:00 a.m.	at Arkansas State Teachers	Conway, AR	T 0–0		
November 19		at Monticello Aggies	Monticello, AR	W 26–6		
November 25		Arkansas College	Kays Field; Jonesboro, AR	W 14–7	2,000	
All times are in Central time

== 1927 ==
1927 Jonesboro A&M Gorillas football
- Conference: Independent
- Record: 4–3
- Head coach: Herbert Schwartz (3rd season)
- Home stadium: Kays Field

The 1927 Jonesboro A&M Gorillas football team represented Jonesboro A&M College—now known as Arkansas State University—as an independent during the 1927 college football season. In their third year under head coach Herbert Schwartz, the Aggies compiled a record of 4–3. The team played home games at Kays Field in Jonesboro, Arkansas.

=== Schedule ===
Date	Time	Opponent	Site	Result	Source
September 24		at Union (TN)	Jackson, TN	L 6–14	
October 7		at Ouachita Baptist	Arkadelphia, AR	L 0–26	
October 21		Southern Illinois	Kays Field; Jonesboro, AR	W 14–0	
October 27	3:30 p.m.	Magnolia A&M	Kays Field; Jonesboro, AR	L 0–13	
November 4		West Tennessee State Teachers	Kays Field; Jonesboro, AR (rivalry)	W 9–6	
November 11	3:30 p.m.	Monticello Aggies	Kays Field; Jonesboro, AR	W 19–0	
November 24		Will Mayfield	Kays Field; Jonesboro, AR	W 12–0	

== 1928 ==
1928 Jonesboro A&M Gorillas football
- Conference: Independent
- Record: 3–3–1
- Head coach: Herbert Schwartz (4th season)
- Home stadium: Kays Field

The 1928 Jonesboro A&M Gorillas football team represented Jonesboro A&M College—now known as Arkansas State University—as an independent during the 1928 college football season. In their fourth year under head coach Herbert Schwartz, the Aggies compiled a record of 3–3–1. The team played home games at Kays Field in Jonesboro, Arkansas.

=== Schedule ===
Date	Time	Opponent	Site	Result	Source
September 28	3:15 p.m.	Mountain Home College	Kays Field; Jonesboro, AR	W 55–0	
October 12		at Lambuth	Jackson, TN	W 20–6	
October 26		at Magnolia A&M	Magnolia, AR	L 0–22	
November 3	3:00 p.m.	at West Tennessee State Teachers	Hodges Field; Memphis, TN (rivalry)	L 14–19	
November 9		at Arkansas College	Batesville, AR	T 6–6	
November 17		at Cape Girardeau	Cape Girardeau, MO	L 0–12	
November 29		Little Rock	Kays Field; Jonesboro, AR	W 6–0	
All times are in Central time

== 1929 ==
1929 Jonesboro A&M Gorillas football
- Conference: Independent
- Record: 2–5
- Head coach: Herbert Schwartz (5th season)
- Home stadium: Kays Field

The 1929 Jonesboro A&M Gorillas football team represented Jonesboro A&M College—now known as Arkansas State University—as an independent during the 1929 college football season. In their fifth year under head coach Herbert Schwartz, the Aggies compiled a record of 2–5. The team played home games at Kays Field in Jonesboro, Arkansas.

=== Schedule ===
Date	Time	Opponent	Site	Result	Attendance	Source
October 11		Lambuth	Kays Field; Jonesboro, AR	W 22–0	> 3,000	
October 19		at Caruthersville Junior College	Caruthersville, MO	L 12–13		
October 25		Magnolia A&M	Kays Field; Jonesboro, AR	L 0–39		
November 1	8:00 p.m.	West Tennessee State Teachers	Kays Field; Jonesboro, AR (rivalry)	L 0–6		
November 11		Will Mayfield	Kays Field; Jonesboro, AR	W 14–0		
November 15		Cape Girardeau	Kays Field; Jonesboro, AR	L 0–25		
November 28		Arkansas College^{†}	Kays Field; Jonesboro, AR	L 13–54		
^{†}Homecoming; All times are in Central time
