= 1934 West Tennessee State Teachers football team =

American college football season

1934 West Tennessee State Teachers football
- Conference: Mississippi Valley Conference
- Record: 3–3–2 (1–0 MVC)
- Head coach: Zach Curlin (11th season)
- Captain: Frank Sanders
- Home stadium: Memorial Field

1934 Mississippi Valley Conference football standings
	Conf.					Overall
Team	W		L		T	W		L		T
Bethel (TN) $	6	–	0	–	0	7	–	1	–	0
West Tennessee State Teachers	1	–	0	–	0	3	–	3	–	2
Tennessee Junior	2	–	1	–	0	7	–	1	–	0
Freed–Hardeman	2	–	2	–	0	2	–	3	–	0
Delta State	2	–	3	–	0	2	–	6	–	1
Sunflower Junior	1	–	2	–	1	1	–	3	–	1
Lambuth	1	–	4	–	1	1	–	8	–	1
Northwest Mississippi	0	–	3	–	0	0	–	3	–	0
$ – Conference champion

The 1934 West Tennessee State Teachers football team was an American football team that represented West Tennessee State Teachers College (now known as the University of Memphis) as a member of the Mississippi Valley Conference (MVC) during the 1934 college football season. In their 11th season under head coach Zach Curlin, West Tennessee State Teachers compiled an overall record of 3–3–2.

== Schedule ==
Date	Time	Opponent	Site	Result	Attendance	Source
September 29	2:30 p.m.	at Ole Miss*	Hemingway Stadium; University, MS (rivalry)	L 0–44		
October 6		at Western Kentucky State Teachers*	Bowling Green, KY	T 0–0		
October 13	2:30 p.m.	Arkansas State*	Memorial Field; Memphis, TN (rivalry)	W 18–0		
October 19		at Cape Girardeau*	Cape Girardeau, MO	L 0–6		
October 26	8:00 p.m.	at Union (TN)*	Union Stadium; Jackson, TN	L 6–13	3,000	
November 3	2:30 p.m.	Middle Tennessee State Teachers*^{†}	Memorial Field; Memphis, TN	W 18–0	1,000	
November 16		at Tennessee Tech*	Tech Field; Cookeville, TN	T 0–0		
November 24	2:00 p.m.	Sunflower Junior	Memorial Field; Memphis, TN	W 33–0		
*Non-conference game; ^{†}Homecoming; All times are in Central time
