= 1933 West Tennessee State Teachers football team =

American college football season

1933 West Tennessee State Teachers football
- Conference: Mississippi Valley Conference
- Record: 7–1–1 (3–0 MVC)
- Head coach: Zach Curlin (10th season)
- Captains: Jack Dodds; Naylor Litchfield
- Home stadium: Memorial Field

1933 Mississippi Valley Conference football standings
	Conf.					Overall
Team	W		L		T	W		L		T
West Tennessee State Teachers	3	–	0	–	0	7	–	1	–	1
Sunflower Junior	2	–	1	–	0	2	–	1	–	0
Bethel (TN) $	3	–	2	–	0	5	–	4	–	0
Tennessee Poly	1	–	1	–	0	4	–	4	–	0
Lambuth	2	–	3	–	1	2	–	5	–	1
Delta State	1	–	2	–	0	2	–	7	–	0
Freed–Hardeman	0	–	3	–	1	0	–	3	–	1
$ – Conference champion

The 1933 West Tennessee State Teachers football team was an American football team that represented West Tennessee State Teachers College (now known as the University of Memphis) as a member of the Mississippi Valley Conference (MVC) during the 1933 college football season. In their tenth season under head coach Zach Curlin, West Tennessee State Teachers compiled an overall record of 7–1–1.

== Schedule ==
Date	Time	Opponent	Site	Result	Source
September 30	2:30 p.m.	Cape Girardeau*	Memorial Field; Memphis, TN	W 18–0	
October 6	3:00 p.m.	at Bethel (TN)	McKenzie, TN	W 20–13	
October 12		at Arkansas College*	Batesville, AR	W 18–6	
October 21		Freed–Hardeman	Memorial Field; Memphis, TN	W 51–0	
October 28	2:30 p.m.	Western Kentucky State Teachers*^{†}	Memorial Field; Memphis, TN	L 0–19	
November 3		at Middle Tennessee State Teachers*	Murfreesboro, TN	W 20–6	
November 18	2:00 p.m.	Tennessee Poly	Memorial Field; Memphis, TN	W 13–0	
November 24		at Arkansas State*	Kays Field; Jonesboro, AR (rivalry)	T 0–0	
November 30	2:00 p.m.	at Union (TN)*	Jackson, TN	W 7–0	
*Non-conference game; ^{†}Homecoming; All times are in Central time
