= 1930 West Tennessee State Teachers football team =

American college football season

1930 West Tennessee State Teachers football

MVC champion
- Conference: Mississippi Valley Conference
- Record: 6–3–1 (6–1 MVC)
- Head coach: Zach Curlin (7th season)
- Captains: Jimmy Graham; Sam Johnson
- Home stadium: Memorial Field

The 1930 West Tennessee State Teachers football team was an American football team that represented West Tennessee State Teachers College (now known as the University of Memphis) as a member of the Mississippi Valley Conference (MVC) during the 1930 college football season. In their seventh season under head coach Zach Curlin, West Tennessee State Teachers compiled an overall record of 6–3–1 with a mark of 6–1 in conference play.

== Schedule ==
Date	Time	Opponent	Site	Result	Source
September 27		at Millsaps*	Alumni Field; Jackson, MS	L 0–40	
October 4	2:15 p.m.	Jonesboro College	Memorial Field; Memphis, TN	W 73–0	
October 11	2:30 p.m.	Caruthersville Junior	Memorial Field; Memphis, TN	W 25–13	
October 17		at Lambuth	Jackson, TN	W 14–6	
October 24		at Cape Girardeau*	Cape Girardeau, MO	T 0–0	
November 1	2:45 p.m.	Arkansas State*	Memorial Field; Memphis, TN (rivalry)	L 6–13	
November 8	3:30 p.m.	at Delta State	Cleveland, MS	L 0–7	
November 14	3:15 p.m.	Bethel (TN)	Memorial Field; Memphis, TN	W 20–0	
November 22	2:15 p.m.	Murray State	Memorial Field; Memphis, TN	W 10–0	
November 27	2:00 p.m.	at Tennessee Junior	Martin, TN	W 14–13	
*Non-conference game; All times are in Central time
