= 1931 Arkansas State Indians football team =

American college football team season

1931 Arkansas State Indians football
- Conference: Arkansas Intercollegiate Conference
- Record: 6–2 (1–2 AIC)
- Head coach: Jack Dale (1st season)
- Home stadium: Kays Field

The 1931 Arkansas State Indians football team represented First District Agricultural and Mechanical College—now known as Arkansas State University—as a member of the Arkansas Intercollegiate Conference (AIC) during the 1931 college football season. Led by first-year head coach Jack Dale, the Indians compiled an overall record of 6–2 with a mark of 1–2 in conference play.

== Schedule ==
Date	Opponent	Site	Result	Source
September 19	First District alumni*	Kays Field; Jonesboro, AR	W 6–0	
September 25	Bethel (TN)*	Kays Field; Jonesboro, AR	W 34–0	
October 2	Bethel (KY)*	Kays Field; Jonesboro, AR	W 13–0	
October 9	Tennessee Junior College*	Kays Field; Jonesboro, AR	W 6–0	
October 16	Arkansas State Teachers	Kays Field; Jonesboro, AR	L 6–18	
October 30	West Tennessee State Teachers*	Kays Field; Jonesboro, AR (rivalry)	W 14–6	
November 11	Arkansas A&M	Kays Field; Jonesboro, AR	L 6–22	
November 20	Magnolia A&M	Kays Field; Jonesboro, AR	W 13–7	
*Non-conference game
