= List of Kentucky college football state champions =

Before the 1903 Kentucky University Pioneers football team won a Southern championship, the highest claim for a Kentucky college football team was a state title.

== State champions ==
- Central (1892)
- Central (1893)
- Kentucky State (1894)
- Centre (1896)
- Central (1897)
- Kentucky State (1898)
- Bethel (1899)
- Central & Centre (1900)
- Kentucky University (1901)
