= 1931 Marshall Thundering Herd football team =

American college football season

1931 Marshall Thundering Herd football

WVAC champion
- Conference: West Virginia Athletic Conference
- Record: 6–3 (4–1 WVAC)
- Head coach: Tom Dandelet (1st season)
- Captain: Ramey Hunter
- Home stadium: Fairfield Stadium

1931 West Virginia Athletic Conference football standings
	Conf.					Overall
Team	W		L		T	W		L		T
Marshall $	4	–	1	–	0	6	–	3	–	0
Glenville State	3	–	1	–	1	4	–	1	–	1
Morris Harvey	4	–	5	–	0	5	–	5	–	0
Salem	2	–	3	–	0	2	–	6	–	0
Fairmont State	1	–	5	–	0	1	–	7	–	0
Concord	0	–	5	–	0	0	–	7	–	0
West Virginia Wesleyan *	3	–	0	–	0	6	–	3	–	1
West Liberty State *	2	–	0	–	1	7	–	1	–	1
Davis & Elkins *	2	–	0	–	0	10	–	1	–	0
New River State *	1	–	0	–	0	5	–	2	–	1
Morehead State *	1	–	1	–	0	4	–	2	–	1
Shepherd *	1	–	1	–	0	4	–	3	–	1
Bethany (WV) *	1	–	2	–	0	1	–	6	–	0
Potomac State *	1	–	2	–	0	1	–	4	–	0
$ – Conference champion; * – Did not qualify for conference standings Ties did not count in conference standings.

The 1931 Marshall Thundering Herd football team was an American football team that represented Marshall College (now Marshall University) as a member of the West Virginia Athletic Conference during the 1931 college football season. In its first season under head coach Tom Dandelet, the Thundering Herd compiled a 6–3 record (4–1 against conference opponents), won the WVAC championship, and outscored opponents by a total of 214 to 84. Ramey Hunter was the team captain.

== Schedule ==
Date	Opponent	Site	Result	Attendance	Source
September 25	Morris Harvey	Fairfield Stadium; Huntington, WV	W 20–6		
October 3	at Bethany (WV)	Bethany, WV	W 31–6		
October 10	Washington & Jefferson*	Fairfield Stadium; Huntington, WV	L 0–19		
October 15	vs. Salem (WV)	Clarksburg, WV	W 6–0		
October 24	Marietta*	Fairfield Stadium; Huntington, WV	W 40–0		
October 31	vs. Emory and Henry*	Wade Stadium; Bluefield, WV	W 44–13	3,500	
November 7	Fairmont State	Fairfield Stadium; Huntington, WV	W 60–0		
November 14	at Wittenberg*	Springfield, OH	L 13–27	7,000	
November 26	West Virginia Wesleyan^{†}	Fairfield Stadium; Huntington, WV	L 0–13		
*Non-conference game; ^{†}Homecoming
