= 1930 Arkansas State Indians football team =

American college football season

1930 Arkansas State Indians football
- Conference: Arkansas Intercollegiate Conference
- Record: 1–4–3 (0–3–1 AIC)
- Head coach: Herbert Schwartz (6th season)
- Home stadium: Kays Field

The 1930 Arkansas State Indians football team, also called the "Arkansas Aggies", "Jonesboro A&M Indians", and "Jonesboro Aggies", represented First District Agricultural and Mechanical College—now known as Arkansas State University—as a member of the Arkansas Intercollegiate Conference (AIC) during the 1930 college football season. Led by sixth-year head coach Herbert Schwartz, the Indians compiled an overall record of 1–4–3 with a mark of 0–3–1 in conference play. The 1930 season marked the first for Arkansas State as a four-year senior college after being elevated from a two-year junior college.

== Schedule ==
| Date | Time | Opponent | Site | Result | Attendance | Source |
|---|---|---|---|---|---|---|
| September 26 | | Caruthersville Junior College* | Kays Field; Jonesboro, AR | T 0–0 | 2,000 | |
| October 4 | | Hendrix-Henderson | Kays Field; Jonesboro, AR | L 0–19 | | |
| October 10 | | at Tennessee Junior College* | Martin, TN | T 7–7 | | |
| October 17 | | Arkansas State Teachers | Kays Field; Jonesboro, AR | L 0–6 | | |
| November 1 | 2:45 p.m. | at West Tennessee State Teachers* | Memorial Field; Memphis, TN (rivalry) | W 13–6 | | |
| November 11 | | Arkansas A&M | Kays Field; Jonesboro, AR | T 0–0 | | |
| November 21 | | at Magnolia A&M | Magnolia, AR | L 0–19 | | |
| November 27 | | at Arkansas College* | Batesville, AR | L 0–27 | | |
*Non-conference game; All times are in Central time
