= 1932 Arkansas State Indians football team =

College football season

1932 Arkansas State Indians football
- Conference: Arkansas Intercollegiate Conference
- Record: 3–4 (1–4 AIC)
- Head coach: Jack Dale (2nd season)
- Home stadium: Kays Field

The 1932 Arkansas State Indians football team represented First District Agricultural and Mechanical College—now known as Arkansas State University—as a member of the Arkansas Intercollegiate Conference (AIC) during the 1932 college football season. Led by second-year head coach Jack Dale, the Indians compiled an overall record of 3–4 with a mark of 1–4 in conference play.

== Schedule ==
Date	Time	Opponent	Site	Result	Attendance	Source
September 23		Northwest Mississippi*	Kays Field; Jonesboro, AR	W 60–0		
September 30		Hendrix	Kays Field; Jonesboro, AR	L 20–26	3,000	
October 7		Arkansas State Teachers	Kays Field; Jonesboro, AR	W 26–0		
October 28		at Magnolia A&M	Magnolia, AR	L 0–15		
November 2	2:45 p.m.	at West Tennessee State Teachers*	Memorial Field; Memphis, TN (rivalry)	W 12–6		
November 11		Arkansas A&M	Kays Field; Jonesboro, AR	L 0–13		
November 18		Ouachita Baptist^{†}	Kays Field; Jonesboro, AR	L 0–13		
*Non-conference game; ^{†}Homecoming; All times are in Central time
