= Basil Stanley =

American football player and sports coach (1896–1975)

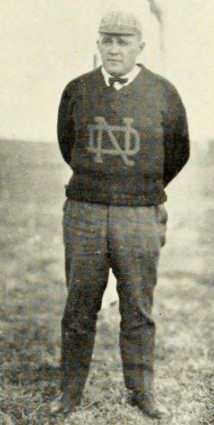
- Stanley pictured in The Yearling (1925), Joneseboro A&M yearbook

Biographical details
- Born: February 8, 1896; Montpelier, Ohio, U.S.
- Died: July 17, 1975 (aged 79); San Francisco, California, U.S.

Playing career
- 1915: Wabash
- 1917: Notre Dame
- 1921–1922: Saint Mary's
- 1924: Rock Island Independents
- Positions: Guard, tackle

Coaching career (HC unless noted)

Football
- 1923: Arizona (assistant)
- 1924: Jonesboro Aggies
- 1926: Notre Dame (freshmen)
- 1927: River Falls State
- 1934: Yreka HS (CA)

Basketball
- 1923–1924: Arizona
- 1926–1927: Berrien Springs HS (MI)
- 1927–1928: River Falls State

Administrative career (AD unless noted)
- 1927–1928: River Falls State

Head coaching record
- Overall: 9–5–1 (college football)

Basil Lavon Stanley (February 8, 1896 – July 17, 1975), nicknamed "Butch" and "Chick", was an American football player, coach of football and basketball, and college athletics administrator. He played college football at three different schools—Wabash College, the University of Notre Dame, and Saint Mary's College of California—and professionally for one season, in 1924, with the Rock Island Independents of the National Football League (NFL). Stanley served as the head football coach at the First District Agricultural School (now known as Arkansas State University) in 1924 and River Falls State Teachers College (now known as the University of Wisconsin–River Falls) in 1927. He was also the head basketball coach at the University of Arizona for one season, in 1923–24.

== Early life and playing career ==
Stanley attended South Bend High School in South Bend, Indiana. In 1915, he entered Wabash College in Crawfordsville, Indiana. A year later, he transferred to the University of Notre Dame, where he lettered in football. Stanley broken his leg in game played on November 17, 1917, at Cartier Field, against Michigan Agricultural. He also suffered a head injury that season. In February 1918, he was held in the St. Joseph County, Indiana jail pending an assessment of his psychological state. He judged to be insane, and committed to the Logancliff Hospital in Logansport, Indiana.

Stanley played football at Saint Mary's College of California as a tackle in 1921 and 1922.

== Coaching career ==
In 1923, Stanley was hired as an assistant football coach at the University of Arizona under head coach Pop McKale. In 1924, he was appointed head football coach at the First District Agricultural School—now known as Arkansas State University—in Jonesboro, Arkansas, succeeding Tom Dandelet. He resigned from his post at Jonesboro in December 2024, and was replaced by Herbert Schwartz. Stanley returned to his alma mater, Notre Dame, in 1926 to coach the freshmen football team under head varsity coach Knute Rockne. In the winter of 1926–27, he coached basketball at Berrien Springs High School in Berrien Springs, Michigan. He earned a master's degree from Notre Dame in 1927. In June of that year, Stanley was named athletic director and head coach of football, basketball, and track and field at River Falls State Teachers College—now known as the University of Wisconsin–River Falls. He stepped down from his post at River Falls State in January 1928 due to poor health, and was succeeded by Marshall Diebold.

In 1934, Stanley was named head football coach at Yreka High School in Yreka, California.

== Death ==
Stanley died on July 17, 1975, in San Francisco.

== Head coaching record ==
=== College football ===
Year	Team	Overall	Conference	Standing	Bowl/playoffs
Jonesboro Aggies (Independent) (1924)
1924 (Note: National Collegiate Athletic Association (NCAA) and Arkansas State records list "Bill Stanley", an apparent misspelling, as Arkansas State's head coach in 1924. Basil Stanley was often referred to as "B. L. Stanley", and contemporary newspaper converge confirms that he was the program's head coach in 1924.)	Jonesboro Aggies	4–4			
Jonesboro Aggies:		4–4			
River Falls State Falcons (Wisconsin State Teachers College Conference) (1927)
1927	River Falls State	5–1–1	3–1–1	3rd	
River Falls State:		5–1–1	3–1–1		
Total:		9–5–1			
