= Zach Curlin =

American football and basketball player and coach (1890–1970)

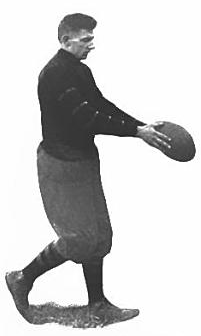
- Curlin c. 1912

Biographical details
- Born: January 31, 1890; Luxora, Arkansas, U.S.
- Died: June 3, 1970 (aged 80); Memphis, Tennessee, U.S.

Playing career

Football
- 1910–1913: Vanderbilt

Basketball
- 1910–1913: Vanderbilt
- Position: Quarterback (football)

Coaching career (HC unless noted)

Football
- 1924–1936: West Tennessee

Basketball
- 1924–1948: West Tennessee / Memphis State

Baseball
- 1927: West Tennessee
- 1934: West Tennessee

Head coaching record
- Overall: 43–60–14 (football); 173–184 (basketball); 13–9 (baseball)

Accomplishments and honors

Championships
- Football; 2 MVC (1929–1930)

Zachary Henry Curlin (January 31, 1890 – June 3, 1970) was an American football and basketball player and coach.

== Background and career ==
Curlin attended Christian Brothers College (now University) in Memphis and the Webb School. and played piano in the band. He was a halfback and quarterback on Dan McGugin's Vanderbilt Commodores football teams from 1910 to 1913, and the starting quarterback in 1912 and 1913, leading Vandy to an SIAA title in 1912. He made kicks on both Harvard and Michigan. Curlin was pulled for his backup Rabbi Robbins in Vanderbilt's largest win its history, a 105–0 win over Bethel in 1912, the muddy conditions better suited to the other's talents. Curlin later served as the Memphis Tigers men's basketball coach for many years.

== Legacy ==
Curlin was inducted into the M Club Hall of Fame in 1974 and a street on the east side of the university's campus bears his name. An award is given annually in his name that recognizes the top male student-athlete at the University of Memphis that possesses his "drive, enthusiasm and determination for academics and athletics while maintaining a concern for others."

== Head coaching record ==
=== Football ===
Year	Team	Overall	Conference	Standing	Bowl/playoffs
West Tennessee State Normal/Teachers (Independent) (1924–1927)
1924	West Tennessee State Normal	1–7–1			
1925	West Tennessee State Teachers	0–7–1			
1926	West Tennessee State Teachers	1–8			
1927	West Tennessee State Teachers	5–3–1			
West Tennessee State Teachers (Mississippi Valley Conference) (1928–1934)
1928	West Tennessee State Teachers	5–3–2	4–1–1	2nd	
1929	West Tennessee State Teachers	8–0–2	5–0–1	1st	
1930	West Tennessee State Teachers	6–3–1	6–1	1st	
1931	West Tennessee State Teachers	2–5–2	1–2–2		
1932	West Tennessee State Teachers	4–5	2–2	T–5th	
1933	West Tennessee State Teachers	7–1–1	3–0	1st	
1934	West Tennessee State Teachers	3–3–2	1–0	2nd	
West Tennessee State Teachers (Southern Intercollegiate Athletic Association) (1935–1936)
1935	West Tennessee State Teachers	1–6–1	0–3–1	30th	
1936	West Tennessee State Teachers	0–9	0–7	32nd	
West Tennessee State Normal/Teachers:		43–60–14	22–16–5		
Total:		43–60–14			
National championship Conference title Conference division title or championship game berth
