= Elza Renfro =

American athlete and coach (1902–1935)

Biographical details
- Born: April 3, 1902; Oklahoma, U.S.
- Died: September 21, 1935 (aged 33); Jackson, Mississippi, U.S.

Playing career

Football
- 1920–1921: Kendall / Tulsa
- 1922–1923: Arkansas

Basketball
- 1920–1922: Kendall / Tulsa
- 1922–1924: Arkansas

Baseball
- 1921–1922: Tulsa
- 1923–1924: Arkansas

Track and field
- 1922–1924: Arkansas
- Position: Quarterback (football)

Coaching career (HC unless noted)

Football
- 1925–1928: Jonesboro HS (AR)
- 1929–1932: Hendrix (assistant)
- 1933: Arkansas State
- 1934–1935: Centenary (backfield)

Basketball
- 1925–1929: Jonesboro HS (AR)
- 1933–1934: Arkansas State (assistant)

Track and field
- 1925–1929: Jonesboro HS (AR)
- 1933–1934: Arkansas State (assistant)

Administrative career (AD unless noted)
- 1925–1929: Jonesboro HS (AR)

Head coaching record
- Overall: 2–4–2 (college football)

Elza Tillman Renfro (April 3, 1902 – September 21, 1935) was an American football, basketball, and baseball player and coach of football, basketball, and track. He served as the head football coach at Arkansas State College—now known as Arkansas State University—for one season in 1933, compiling a record of 2–4–2.

Renfro initially began his college playing career with the University of Tulsa. In 1922, he transferred to the University of Arkansas.

After four seasons as head football coach and athletic director of Jonesboro High School, Renfro left to become an assistant coach for Hendrix College in 1929. He held the post for four years before becoming the head football coach for Arkansas State College. He took over for Jack Dale who resigned to become the head coach at Paragould High School. After an unsuccessful 2–4–2 rookie season, Renfro opted to leave the Jonesboro school and become the backfield coach to Curtis Parker at the Centenary College of Louisiana. He held the position until his death.

Renfro died of blood poisoning in 1935.

== Head coaching record ==
=== College football ===
Year	Team	Overall	Conference	Standing	Bowl/playoffs
Arkansas State Indians (Arkansas Intercollegiate Conference) (1933)
1933	Arkansas State	2–4–2	1–3–1		
Arkansas State:		2–4–2	1–3–1		
Total:		2–4–2			
