= 1933 Arkansas State Indians football team =

American college football season

1933 Arkansas State Indians football
- Conference: Arkansas Intercollegiate Conference
- Record: 2–4–2 (1–3–1 AIC)
- Head coach: Elza Renfro (1st season)
- Home stadium: Kays Field

The 1933 Arkansas State Indians football team represented Arkansas State College—now known as Arkansas State University—as a member of the Arkansas Intercollegiate Conference (AIC) during the 1933 college football season. Led by first-year Elza Renfro in his first and only season as head coach, the Indians compiled an overall record of 2–4–2 with a mark of 1–3–1 in conference play. Arkansas State played home games at Kays Field in Jonesboro, Arkansas.

== Schedule ==
Date	Opponent	Site	Result	Source
September 22	at Hendrix	Conway, AR	T 0–0	
October 6	at Arkansas State Teachers	Conway, AR	W 13–6	
October 20	Tennessee Tech*	Kays Field; Jonesboro, AR	L 0–12	
October 27	Magnolia A&M	Kays Field; Jonesboro, AR	L 12–13	
November 10	Arkansas A&M	Kays Field; Jonesboro, AR	L 0–14	
November 17	Ouachita Baptist	Kays Field; Jonesboro, AR	L 6–34	
November 24	West Tennessee State Teachers*	Kays Field; Jonesboro, AR (rivalry)	T 0–0	
November 30	Arkansas College*	Kays Field; Jonesboro, AR	W 3–0	
*Non-conference game
