= Herbert Schwartz =

American college sports coach, athletics administrator (1895–1994)

Biographical details
- Born: February 4, 1895; Royalton, Minnesota, U.S.
- Died: March 16, 1994 (aged 99); Buckman, Minnesota, U.S.

Playing career

Football
- 1921–1922: Jonesboro Aggies

Coaching career (HC unless noted)

Football
- 1923–1924: Jonesboro Aggies (second team)
- 1925–1930: Jonesboro A&M / Arkansas State
- 1932–1934: Luxuora HS (AR)
- 1935: Arkansas State (freshmen)
- 1943–?: North Little Rock HS (AR)

Basketball
- 1923–1924: Jonesboro Aggies (second team)
- 1924–1931: Jonesboro A&M / Arkansas State
- 1932–1935: Luxuora HS (AR)
- 1941–1942: Arkansas State
- 1943–?: North Little Rock HS (AR)

Baseball
- 1924–1929: Jonesboro Aggies / A&M

Administrative career (AD unless noted)
- 1925–1931: Jonesboro A&M / Arkansas State
- 1935–1943: Arkansas State
- 1943–?: North Little Rock HS (AR)

Head coaching record
- Overall: 18–21–6 (college football); 38–72 (college basketball); 27–33–2 (college baseball)

Herbert B. Schwartz (February 4, 1895 – March 16, 1994) was an American football player and coach of football, basketball, and baseball. He served as the head football coach at the First District Agricultural and Mechanical College of Jonesboro, Arkansas—now known as Arkansas State University—from 1925 to 1930, compiling a record of 18–21–6. Schwartz was also the head basketball coach at First District A&M from 1924 to 1931 and again during the 1941–42 season, and the school's head baseball coach from 1924 to 1929.

Schwartz was born on February 4, 1895, in Royalton, Minnesota, to Steve and Elizabeth (Haskamp) Schwartz. He graduated from Valparaiso University and later pursue graduate studies at the University of Minnesota and the University of Michigan.

Schwartz began coaching the second football and basketball teams at Jonesboro in 1923. When Basil Stanley resigned as the school athletic director and head coach in December 1924, Schwartz took over as head coach for the basketball team. In 1925, he was promoted to athletic director and head coach. He resigned from his posts at Arkansas State in 1931 to pursue a master's degree. Schwartz coached for three years at Luxora High School in Luxora, Arkansas. He returned to Arkansas State in 1935, and served again as athletic director. He also coached the freshman football team. Schwartz left Arkansas State for the second time in 1943 to serve with the Red Cross during World War II. He resumed coaching later in 1943, at North Little Rock High School in North Little Rock, Arkansas.

Schwartz died on March 16, 1994, at his home in Buckman, Minnesota.

== Head coaching record ==
=== College football ===
Year	Team	Overall	Conference	Standing	Bowl/playoffs
Jonesboro A&M Gorillas (Independent) (1925–1929)
1925	Jonesboro A&M	4–3–1			
1926	Jonesboro A&M	4–3–1			
1927	Jonesboro A&M	4–3			
1928	Jonesboro A&M	3–3–1			
1929	Jonesboro A&M	2–5			
Arkansas State Indians (Arkansas Intercollegiate Conference) (1930)
1930	Arkansas State	1–4–3	0–3–1		
Jonesboro A&M / Arkansas State:		18–21–6			
Total:		18–21–6			
