= 1899 Bethel Golden Bears football team =

1899 Bethel Golden Bears football

State champion
- Conference: Independent
- Record: 2–1–1

The 1899 Bethel Golden Bears football team represented Bethel College in Russellville, Kentucky during the 1899 college football season. The team claimed a state championship.

== Schedule ==
Date	Opponent	Site	Result	Attendance	Source
October 21	at Nashville	Nashville, TN	T 5–5		
October 24	Kentucky University		W 22–0		
November 4	Centre		W 10–6		
November 11	Vanderbilt	Dudley Field; Nashville, TN	L 0–22		
