= Dave Bennett (baseball) =

American baseball player (born 1945)

- Pitcher
- Born: November 7, 1945 (age 80); Berkeley, California, U.S.
- Batted: Right Threw: Right

MLB debut
- June 12, 1964, for the Philadelphia Phillies

Last MLB appearance
- June 12, 1964, for the Philadelphia Phillies

MLB statistics
- Games pitched: 1
- Innings pitched: 1
- Earned run average: 9.00
- Strikeouts: 1
- Stats at Baseball Reference

Teams
- Philadelphia Phillies (1964)

David Hans Bennett (born November 7, 1945) is an American former professional baseball right-handed pitcher. During his playing days, Bennett stood 6 feet 5 inches (1.96 m) tall, weighing 195 pounds (88 kg). He had a 12-year pro career (1963–1974), but appeared in only one Major League Baseball (MLB) game, as a member of the 1964 Philadelphia Phillies.

Bennett worked just one inning — the ninth — in relief, on June 12, against the New York Mets at Connie Mack Stadium. He allowed a leadoff triple to Joe Christopher, then wild pitched him home. Bennett later allowed a double to veteran Mets' shortstop Roy McMillan, who was left stranded. Bennett struck out Charley Smith and issued no bases on balls. The game, won by the Mets 11–3, had been started by Dave Bennett's older brother and teammate, Dennis, who took the loss.

== Early life ==
Bennet attended Yreka High School and in 1963 he was signed by the Philadelphia Phillies as an undrafted free agent (prior to the establishment of the Major League Draft).

== Minor league career ==
Bennett pitched in the Phillies' farm system for seven years, before being dealt to the Pittsburgh Pirates organization (with minor leaguer Mike Everett) for catcher Del Bates, on January 28, 1970.

== See also ==
- Philadelphia Phillies all-time roster
