= Tom Dandelet =

American football and basketball coach (1897–1950)

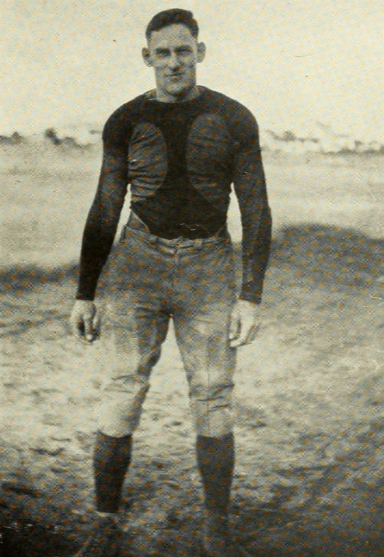

Biographical details
- Born: August 1, 1897; Faribault, Minnesota, U.S.
- Died: March 30, 1950 (aged 52); Huntington, West Virginia, U.S.

Playing career

Football
- 1915–1916: St. Thomas (MN)
- 1919–1920: Valparaiso

Basketball
- 1915–1917: St. Thomas (MN)
- 1919–1921: Valparaiso
- Positions: Fullback, tackle (football); Guard (basketball)

Coaching career (HC unless noted)

Football
- 1921–1923: Jonesboro Aggies
- 1924–1929: Ceredo-Kenova HS (WV)
- 1930: Marshall (assistant)
- 1931–1934: Marshall

Basketball
- 1930–1931: Marshall (assistant)
- 1931–1935: Marshall

Baseball
- 1922–1923: Jonesboro Aggies

Administrative career (AD unless noted)
- 1921–1924: Jonesboro Aggies

Head coaching record
- Overall: 21–31–4 (college football); 43–35 (college basketball)

Accomplishments and honors

Championships
- Football; 1 WVIAC (1931)

Thomas Edward Dandelet (August 1, 1897 – March 30, 1950) was an American college football and college basketball coach. He served as the head football coach at the First District Agricultural School of Jonesboro, Arkansas—now known as Arkansas State University—from 1921 to 1923 and at Marshall College—now known as Marshall University—from 1931 to 1934, compiling a career college football head record of 21–31–4. Dandelet was also the head basketball coach at Marshall from 1931 to 1935, tallying a mark of 43–35.

== Early life and playing career ==
Dandelet attended the College of St. Thomas—now known as the University of St. Thomas—in Saint Paul, Minnesota, where he played football, and was captain of the basketball team. He latter when to Valparaiso University, where he played football at a fullback, and was team captain.

== Career ==
Dandelet was hired in 1921 as athletic director at the First District Agricultural School of Jonesboro, Arkansas—now known as Arkansas State University. He began coaching the Jonesboro Aggies football team in the fall of 1921. He resigned from his post at Jonesboro in early 1924, and was succeeded by Basil Stanley.

Moving to the Tri-State area of Kentucky, Ohio, and West Virginia, Dandelet played for semi-professional football teams like Armco Steel in Catlettsburg, Kentucky, and with Ironton Tanks and Portsmouth Spartans, while coaching football at his alma mater, Ceredo-Kenova High School in nearby Wayne County, West Virginia. In 1930, he was hired at Marshall College—now known as Marshall University as an assistant coach in football under John Maulbetsch and in basketball under Johnny Stuart. He had earned a Bachelor of Arts degree from Marshall the previous year. From 1931 to 1934, Dandelet was the head football coach at Marshall, compiling a record of 18–16–2 despite being underfunded and out-manned often in the Buckeye Conference, which included the University of Cincinnati, Ohio University, the University of Dayton, Miami University and Ohio Wesleyan University. After being released as football coach to make way for Cam Henderson to assume the Herd football and basketball jobs, Dandelet remained as a professor in the Health, Physical Education and Recreation Department and was also Dean of Men through 1950 at Marshall College.

== Death ==
Dandelet died of a heart attack at his home in Huntington, West Virginia on March 30, 1950.

== Head coaching record ==
=== College football ===
Year	Team	Overall	Conference	Standing	Bowl/playoffs
Jonesboro Aggies (Independent) (1921–1923)
1921	Jonesboro Aggies	3–2–1			
1922	Jonesboro Aggies	0–7			
1923	Jonesboro Aggies	0–6–1			
Jonesboro Aggies:		3–15–1			
Marshall Thundering Herd (West Virginia Intercollegiate Athletic Conference) (1931–1932)
1931	Marshall	6–3	4–1	1st	
1932	Marshall	6–2–1	3–0	NA	
Marshall Thundering Herd (Buckeye Athletic Association / West Virginia Intercollegiate Athletic Conference) (1933–1934)
1933	Marshall	3–5–1	1–3–1 / 0–1	5th / NA	
1934	Marshall	3–6	0–4 / 1–1	5th / NA	
Marshall:		18–16–2	9–10–1		
Total:		21–31–4			
National championship Conference title Conference division title or championship game berth
