= Bethel Golden Bears football =

Football program representing Bethel College

- First season: 1894
- Last season: 1931
- Location: Russellville, Kentucky
- Colors: Blue and Gold

The Bethel Golden Bears football team was the college football program of Bethel College in Russellville, Kentucky from 1894 to 1931. It was the state champion in 1899. Josh Cody played on the 1912 team which lost 105 to 0 to Vanderbilt. The Bethel football team also regularly played such schools as Cumberland and Transylvania.
