= Dennis Bennett (baseball) =

American baseball player (1939–2012)

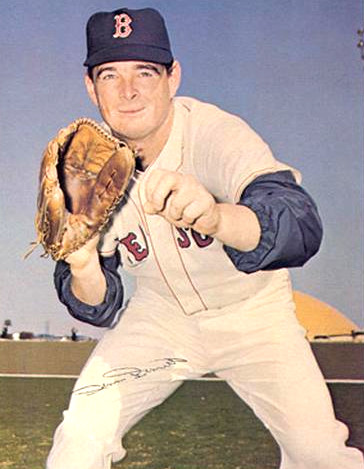
- Bennett in 1966
- Pitcher
- Born: October 5, 1939; Oakland, California, U.S.
- Died: March 24, 2012 (aged 72); Klamath Falls, Oregon, U.S.
- Batted: Left Threw: Left

MLB debut
- May 12, 1962, for the Philadelphia Phillies

Last MLB appearance
- September 29, 1968, for the California Angels

MLB statistics
- Win–loss record: 43–47
- Earned run average: 3.69
- Strikeouts: 572
- Stats at Baseball Reference

Teams
- Philadelphia Phillies (1962–1964); Boston Red Sox (1965–1967); New York Mets (1967); California Angels (1968)

Dennis John Bennett (October 5, 1939 – March 24, 2012) was an American professional baseball starting pitcher who played Major League Baseball (MLB) for the Philadelphia Phillies, Boston Red Sox, New York Mets and California Angels over seven seasons (1962–1968). Bennett batted and threw left-handed, stood 6 feet 3 inches (1.91 m) tall, and weighed 192 pounds (87 kg). He was the older brother of Dave Bennett, a right-handed pitcher who appeared in one MLB game as Dennis's 1964 Phillies teammate.

Bennett was born in Oakland, California, raised in the Shasta Valley town of Yreka, near the Oregon border, and attended Yreka High School. He was signed by the Phillies in 1958 after attending Shasta College and played four full seasons in their farm system before being promoted to the Majors from Triple-A in May 1962. He had a strong rookie campaign, appearing in 31 games, including 24 starts, winning nine contests with seven complete games and two shutouts. He struck out 149 hitters in 1742/3 innings pitched and reached double figures in strikeouts in four games. But he was seriously injured in a car accident in January 1963 while playing winter baseball in Puerto Rico, delaying his 1963 debut until June 23. Nevertheless, he again won nine games as the Phillies finished in the first division for the first time since 1955.

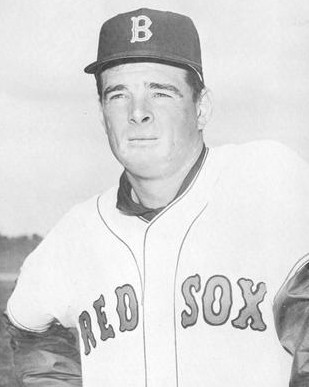
Bennett, circa 1965

He was the Phillies' opening day starting pitcher in 1964 against the Mets and did not record a decision in a game the Phils eventually won, 5–3, behind reliever Johnny Klippstein. Bennett took a regular turn in the 1964 Phillies' starting rotation but a lingering shoulder injury, a leftover from his winter 1963 car accident, began to limit his effectiveness in the season's final weeks. In late September, during the Phillies' disastrous ten-game losing streak that knocked them out of first place, Bennett lost his only two starts: September 23 against the Cincinnati Reds and then six days later against the St. Louis Cardinals. In November, he was traded to the Red Sox for slugging first baseman Dick Stuart.

A sore arm plagued Bennett during his Red Sox tenure: he made 42 starts in almost 2 1/2 years, with the lone highlight a complete game, 4–0 shutout against the Angels on May 1, 1967—a game in which Bennett helped his own cause with a three-run home run off Jorge Rubio. He had another complete game win against the Angels on May 30 (a five-hit, 6–1 triumph), but a little more than three weeks later, he was traded on waivers to the Mets. During his half-season with Boston, he contributed four wins to the 1967 Red Sox, who unexpectedly won the American League pennant on the season's final day.

After going 1–1 with the 1967 Mets, Bennett played at the Triple-A level in the Chicago Cubs' organization before landing with the 1968 Angels, where he went winless in five decisions over the season's final two months. In a seven-season MLB career and in 182 games pitched, Bennett posted a 43–47 record with 572 strikeouts and a 3.69 ERA in 863 innings pitched, including six shutouts and 28 complete games. He played in the minors into 1973 before retiring from the game.

== Death ==
Upon leaving baseball, Bennett owned a bar in Klamath Falls, Oregon. He died, aged 72, on March 24, 2012, at his Klamath Falls home.
