= Alpha Kappa Phi =

American college fraternity (1858–1878)

- ΑΚΦ
- Founded: c. 1858; 168 years ago Centre College
- Type: Social
- Affiliation: Independent
- Status: Merged
- Merge date: 1879
- Successor: Beta Theta Pi
- Scope: National
- Chapters: 14
- Headquarters: United States

Alpha Kappa Phi (ΑΚΦ) was an American college fraternity. It was established in c. 1858 at Centre College in Danville, Kentucky. The fraternity chartered at least fourteen chapters. It merged into the Beta Theta Pi fraternity in 1878 and 1879.

== History ==
Alpha Kappa Phi was established c. 1858 at Centre College in Danville, Kentucky as a social fraternity. In the first edition of American College Fraternities, William Raimond Baird noted the fraternity's exact date of formation was not known because Alpha Kappa Phi's records were lost during the Civil War. However, a bill to incorporate the fraternity was submitted to the Kentucky General Assembly in December 1859.

The fraternity quickly added chapters in the Southern United States. Chapters were added at Bacon College and LaGrange College in 1859, followed by the University of Mississippi and the University of Louisville in 1860. It was incorporated as Alpha Kappa Phi Society in the Commonwealth of Kentucky on February 4, 1860. The fraternity also claimed to have added chapters in the Northern United States.

Alpha Kappa Psi's operations were disrupted during the Civil War, with chapters and colleges going inactive. After the Civil War, some chapters were reactivated, including Centre College and the University of Mississippi. At first, the fraternity seemed to rebound, establishing new chapters at Transylvania University in 1867 and Princeton University and Georgetown University in 1869.

However, only the chapters at Centre College and the University of Mississippi continued to operate past 1875. In 1878, the Centre College chapter disbanded and its members joined the campus's existing chapter of Beta Theta Pi in 1878. The University of Mississippi chapter became the Beta Beta chapter of Beta Theta Pi in 1879. The chapter at Southern University continued operating as a local fraternity into the 1890s.

== Symbols ==
Alpha Kappa Phi's badge was a shield with concave-curved sides, bearing the Greek letters "ΑΚΦ" in its center, under a pair of clasped hands. Below the Greek letters were three links of chain, surrounding the Greek letters "ααπ".

== Chapters ==
The exact names and numbers of Alpha Kappa Phi's chapters are unknown due to the loss of records during the Civil War. It was not connected with the literary society by the same name at Hillsdale College. Following are the known chapters of Alpha Kappa Phi, with inactive chapters in institutions indicated in italics.

Chapter	Charter date and range	Institution	Location	Status	Ref.
Alpha	c. 1858–1878	Centre College	Danville, Kentucky	Merged (ΒΘΠ)	(Note: The chapters withdrew and joined Beta Theta Pi.)
Beta	1859–186x?	Bacon College	Georgetown, Kentucky	Inactive	(Note: Bacon College became Kentucky University in 1858 and closed in 1861.)
	185x ?–18xx ??	LaGrange College	LaGrange, Georgia	Inactive	
Psi (see Epsilon)	1860–1865	University of Mississippi	University, Mississippi	Merged	
Gamma	1860–1861	University of Louisville	Louisville, Kentucky	Inactive	
Delta	1867–18xx ?	Transylvania University	Lexington, Kentucky	Inactive	
Epsilon (see Psi)	1867–1879	University of Mississippi	University, Mississippi	Merged (ΒΘΠ)	(Note: The chapter became the Beta Beta chapter of Beta Theta Pi.)
Zeta	186x ?–186s ?		Washington County, Virginia	Inactive	
Eta	1869–18xx ?	Princeton University	Princeton, New Jersey	Inactive	
Theta	1869–1873	Georgetown College	Georgetown, Kentucky	Inactive	
	18xs ?–18xx ?	Cumberland University	Lebanon, Tennessee	Inactive	
	18xx ?–18xx ?	Bethel College	Russellville, Kentucky	Inactive	
	18xx ?–18xx ?	Oakland College	Rodney, Mississippi	Inactive	(Note: The college closed in 1871.)
	18xx ?–after December 1895	Southern University	Greensboro, Alabama	Withdrew (local)	(Note: The college merged with Birmingham College to form Southern-Birmingham College in Birmingham, Alabama in 1918)
