= Jack Dale (coach) =

American football and basketball coach (1904–1975)

Biographical details
- Born: February 28, 1904; Rock Island, Illinois, U.S.
- Died: September 5, 1975 (aged 71); Paragould, Arkansas, U.S.

Playing career

Football
- 1928–1930: Arkansas

Track and field
- 1928?–1931: Arkansas
- Position: Fullback (football)

Coaching career (HC unless noted)

Football
- 1931–1932: Arkansas State
- 1933–1940: Paragould HS (AR)
- 1954–1959: Paragould HS (AR)

Basketball
- 1931–1933: Arkansas State

Head coaching record
- Overall: 9–6 (college football); 20–15 (college basketball)

Accomplishments and honors

Awards
- Football; Second-team All-SWC (1931)

Jack Clarke Dale (February 28, 1904 – September 6, 1975) was an American college football and college basketball coach. He served as the head football coach at the First District Agricultural and Mechanical College—now known as Arkansas State University—from 1931 to 1932, compiling a record of 9–6. Dale was also the head basketball coach at First District A&M from 1931 to 1933, tallying a mark of 20–15.

Dale grew up in an Omaha, Nebraska, orphanage. He ran away at the age of six and enlisted into the United States Army at 14. After three years as a member of the United States Army Coast Artillery Corps, he graduated from Gothenburg High School in Gothenburg, Nebraska. He later enrolled at the University of Arkansas, where he played fullback for the football team, earning Second-team All-Southwest Conference (SWC) in 1931. He also served as the captain for the 1931 track and field team.

After two seasons at First District A&M, Dale was hired as the head football coach for Paragould High School in Paragould, Arkansas. He resigned following the 1940 season to work for his father-in-law, R. E. Spillman, at Spillman Milling Company. In 1954, Dale returned to Paragould High School.

Dale was married to his wife Halavie and had a daughter. He died on September 6, 1975, at his home in Paragould.

== Head coaching record ==
=== College football ===
Year	Team	Overall	Conference	Standing	Bowl/playoffs
Arkansas State Indians (Arkansas Intercollegiate Conference) (1931–1932)
1931	Arkansas State	6–2	1–2		
1932	Arkansas State	3–4	1–4		
Arkansas State:		9–6	2–6		
Total:		9–6			
