= Ramey Hunter =

American football player (1910–1992)

Profile
- Position: End

Personal information
- Born: August 26, 1910; Willard, Kentucky, U.S.
- Died: January 17, 1992 (aged 81); Livingston, Montana, U.S.
- Listed height: 6 ft 0 in (1.83 m)
- Listed weight: 178 lb (81 kg)

Career information
- High school: Huntington (Huntington, West Virginia)
- College: Marshall

Career history
- Portsmouth Spartans (1933)

Career NFL statistics
- Games played: 2
- Stats at Pro Football Reference

Raymond Q. Hunter (August 26, 1910 – January 17, 1992) was a professional American football end. He played one season with the Portsmouth Spartans of the National Football League (NFL). He played college football at Marshall.

At Marshall, Hunter was a team captain on the football and basketball teams. In 1932, Hunter scored the game-winning touchdown in the North–South All-Star game. In 1985, he was inducted into the Marshall University Athletics Hall of Fame as a four sport athlete in football, basketball, baseball, and track.
