= Yreka High School =

School in California, US

Coordinates: 41.7411°N 122.6377°W

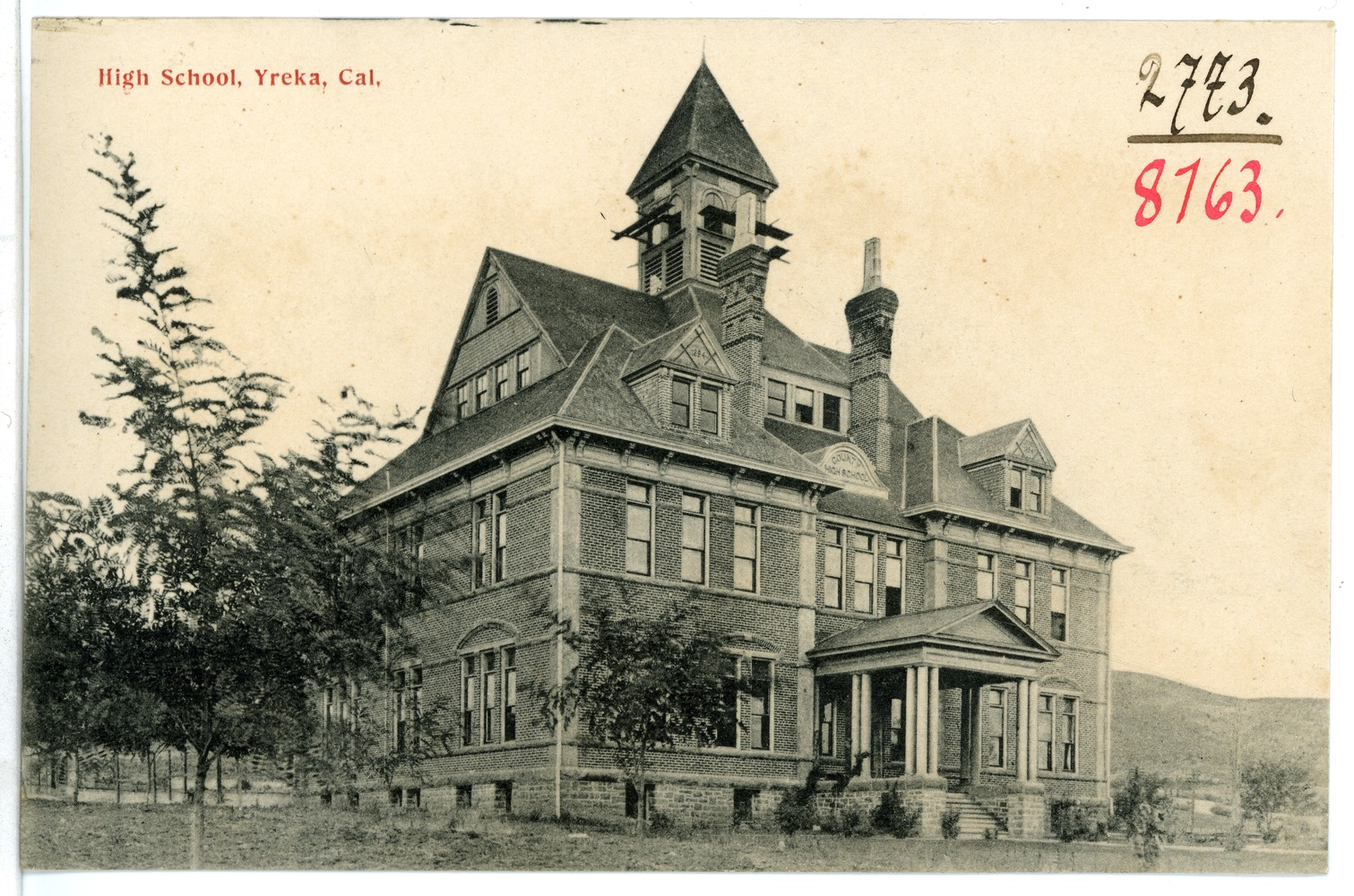
- Original building c. 1906
- 400 Preece Way; Yreka, California 96097; United States

Information
- Type: Public high school
- Established: 1893
- Principal: Mark Greenfield
- Teaching staff: 35.47 (FTE)
- Enrollment: 636 (2024–2025)
- Student to teacher ratio: 18.86
- Color
- Mascot: Miner
- Website: Yreka High School

Yreka High School is a public high school in Yreka, California, United States. It was founded in 1893.

== History ==
The school burned down in 1916 and was rebuilt as a two-story structure in 1918 that was in use until 1958.The school has remained the same ever since but has had many upgrades over the years ever since.

The school district was originally known as Siskiyou County Unified school district from the mid 1890's until 1961 when it was renamed Yreka Union.It also changed its long time school colors of White and gold to its current colors of red,white and yellow that same year(black was added as an alternate color later on)

== Notable alumni ==
- Jodi Ann Arias, Convicted Murderer (did not graduate)
- Ray Coleman, Major League Baseball player
- Dave Bennett, Major League Baseball player
- Dennis Bennett, Major League Baseball player
- Tim Meamber, NFL Linebacker
