= Little Rock College =

Little Rock College was a Roman Catholic institution of higher learning located in Little Rock, Arkansas. Founded in 1908, it closed in 1930.

Its campus is now the site of the Catholic High School for Boys.
