= Will Mayfield College =

- Will Mayfield College Campus
- U.S. National Register of Historic Places
- Location within Missouri Location within the United States
- Location: 207 Mayfield Dr., Marble Hill, Missouri
- Coordinates: 37°18′31″N 89°58′30″W
- Area: 1.27 acres (0.51 ha)
- Built: 1884, 1909, 1924
- Architect: Pendleton, L. Baylor
- Architectural style: Classical Revival, Four Room School
- NRHP reference No.: 12001176
- Will Mayfield College Arts and Science Building
- U.S. National Register of Historic Places
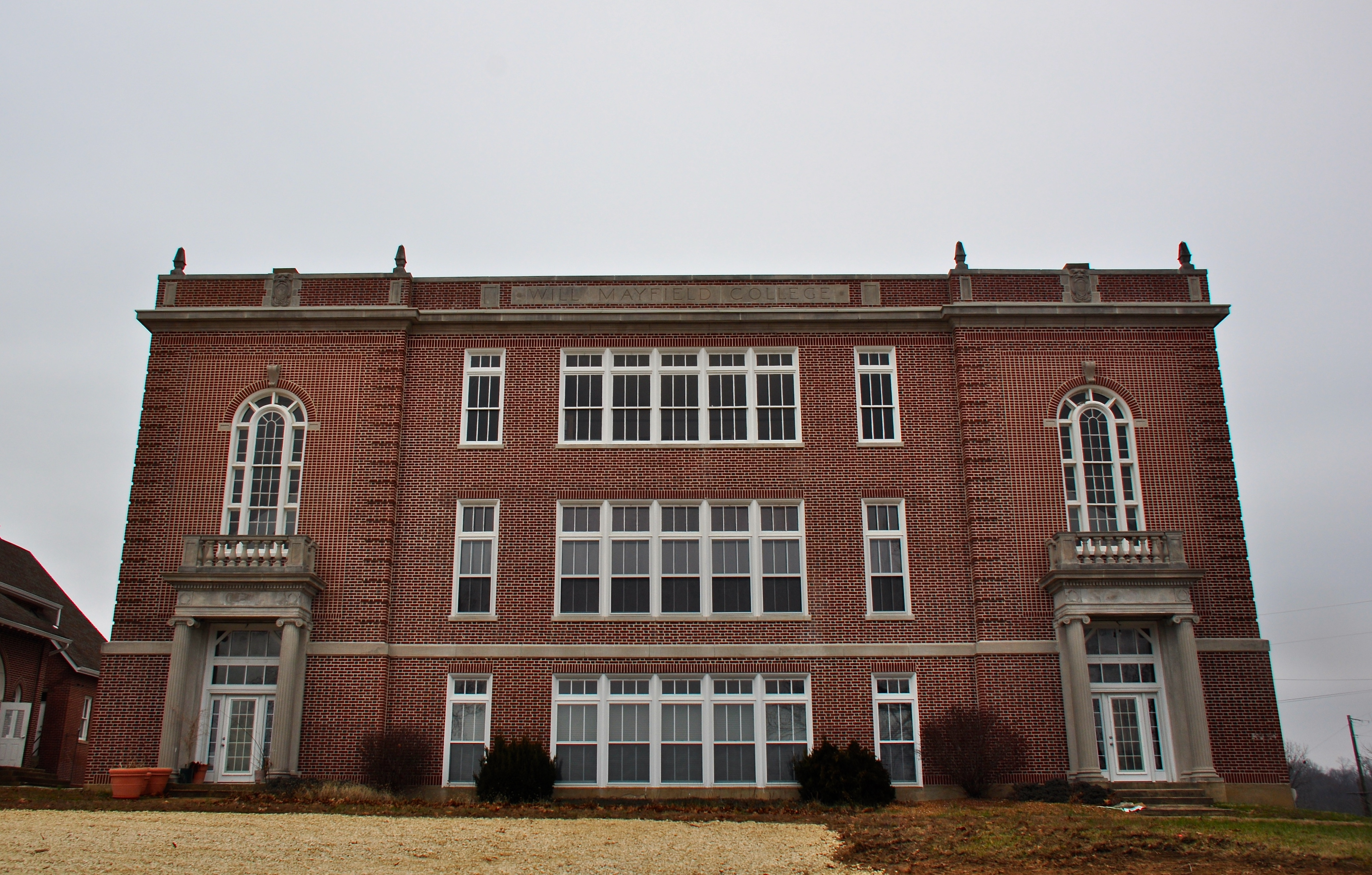
- Will Mayfield College Arts and Science Building, December 2014
- Location: 207 Mayfield Dr., Marble Hill, Missouri
- Coordinates: 37°18′31″N 89°58′28″W
- Area: less than one acre
- Built: 1924-1927
- Architect: Pendleton, L. Baylor; Penzer, Linus
- Architectural style: Classical Revival
- NRHP reference No.: 05000929
- Added to NRHP: May 25, 2005
- Added to NRHP: January 14, 2013`

Will Mayfield College was a Baptist school located in Marble Hill, Missouri. From 1878 to 1934, the college offered four years of preparatory school and two years of junior college work.

Will Mayfield was founded by William Henderson Mayfield and Dr. H. J. Smith as the Mayfield-Smith Academy in Smithville (now Sedgewickville) in Bollinger County. It was governed by the St. Francois Baptist Association.

In 1880, the college was moved to the county seat at Marble Hill; the first building was completed in 1885. Historically known as the Administration Building, it was also used for classrooms, chapel and auditorium space. Significant additions designed by L. Baylor Pendleton were constructed in 1909 and 1924–25. The original section of this brick building is typical of two-story, four room educational buildings. The name of the school was changed in 1903 to Will Mayfield College in honor of William Henderson Mayfield's son, Will, who was a graduate of Mayfield-Smith Academy and who had died the previous year at the age of 20. The Arts and Science Building is a two-story brick building with raised basement has Classical Revival details and was constructed in 1924-1927 from plans by L. Baylor Pendleton.

Will Mayfield College permanently ceased operations in 1934 due to financial reasons. The Bollinger County Museum of Natural History operated on the grounds of the college from 1988 to 2022, when it closed due to a lack of funds caused by the pandemic. When it was open the museum featured dioramas of dinosaurs (including a near life size replica nest of a Hadrosaur, including the mother), as well as exhibits featuring models of Native Americans & white settlers and their artifacts. It also exhibited dinosaur bones & local fossils dug from the nearby village of Glen Allen which included trilobites, brachiopods, and crinoids from the Devonian and Mississippian periods. The museum also featured a rock and mineral collection.

The Mayfield Cultural Center is housed in the original Administration Building and the attached chapel, with stage and balcony. The building is used as a visual and performing arts space and is also available for use as a banquet facility for weddings and special occasions. Both the museum and cultural center are projects of the Will Mayfield Heritage Foundation, a 501(c)3 non profit organization.

The Arts and Science Building was listed on the National Register of Historic Places in 2005. The remainder of the campus was added in 2012.
