= Bethel College (Kentucky) =

Baptist college in Kentucky (1854–1964)

Coordinates: 36°51.793′N 87°29.555′W

- Former names: Russellville Male Academy (1851–1854); Russellville Male College (1854–1917); Bethel College (1917–1933); Bethel Female College (1858–1817); Bethel Women's College (1917–1951)
- Type: Private
- Active: 1854–1964
- Religious affiliation: Baptist
- Location: Russellville, Kentucky and Hopkinsville, Kentucky, United States
- Campus: Multiple Sites
- Colors: Blue and Gold
- Mascot: Golden Bears

Bethel College was the name of two related Baptist-affiliated colleges in Kentucky. The college opened in 1854 and operated under various names before closing in 1964. Throughout most of its history, the Hopkinsville campus was a women's college while the Russellville campus was a men's college. Both campuses became coeducational before closing.

== History ==
Baptist minister Samuel Baker is credited with coming up with the idea of establishing Bethel College in southcentral Kentucky. Baker came to Russellville, Kentucky in 1841 as the minister of the Baptist church and took a similar position in Hopkinsville, Kentucky five years later. In addition to preaching at the Hopkinsville Baptist Church, Baker chaired the education committee of the Bethel Association of Baptists. The Baptist Association of Southwestern Kentucky approved the establishment of a college in Russellville in September 1849. The school received its charter from Kentucky in 1851.

=== Russellville campus ===
Construction on the central building began in 1852. The Russellville campus opened as Russellville Male Academy on January 3, 1854. Its first principal was B. T. Blewitt. A new charter was secured, and the high school became a college in 1854.

The college closed from 1861 to September 1863 during the Civil War. The Confederate Convention met there in 1861, and it was also used as a hospital.

By 1910, the college had an endowment of $102,930 ($3,556,599 in 2024 money). The college changed its name in 1917 to Bethel College. It became co-educational in 1923. However, the college had debts and could no longer compete with larger colleges. It closed in January 1933, after the fall graduation. The college's enrollment peaked at 213 students. In June 1933, the college merged with Georgetown University.

=== Hopkinsville campus ===
After the boys' school in 1854, Baker outlined the case for a similar institution for young women at the association's annual meeting. A charter was received for the Baptist Female Institute, and efforts were made to raise the $30,000 needed for campus and buildings. Construction began in 1854. The institution opened as Bethel Female High School in 1856. Its first president was W. F. Hill.

It was rechartered as Bethel Female College in 1858, under the Green River Educational Convention. During the Civil War, the college closed for two years. The Hopkinsville campus was used as a hospital during a black measles epidemic from 1861 to 1862. In 1884, the study body averaged 100 women, with 35 being boarding students. Between 1874 and 1884, 68 students graduated.

The college changed its name on July 2, 1917, to Bethel Women's College. During World War II, the college closed from 1942 to 1945 and its rooms were rented to Camp Campbell army officers.

On August 22, 1951, the college became co-educational and changed its name to simply Bethel College. It closed in 1964. Some 1,770 students graduated from the college.

== Campus ==
Bethel Men's College was on the western outskirts of Russellville, Kentucky. The campus consisted of sixteen acres. It had five buildings, including the Main Hall, two dormitories (Nimrod Long Hall and Long Hall), a library and gymnasium, and the president's house. Its athletic field was called Brookside Park. Its buildings were demolished in 1868.

Bethel Female College, later Bethel College, was located forty miles away on six acres in the western suburbs of Hopkinsville, Kentucky. Its address was located on West 15th Street between Main and Canton streets. Its main building was a three-story brick structure with a basement. It had the capacity to board sixty students. Most of the Hopkinsville campus razed in 1966; its former gymnasium remains as of 2019.

== Academics ==
One of the goals of Bethel Male College was to educate ministers and teachers. It was a four-year college from 1917 to 1920. From 1921 until its closing in 1933, it was a junior college.

The Bethel Female College included a School of Languages, ancient and modern; School of Mathematics, pure and mixed; School of English, including belle letters and mental and moral sciences; School of Natural Sciences, and the School of Fine Arts.

== Student life ==
Bethel Men's College had a chapters of Alpha Kappa Phi, Alpha Tau Omega, Kappa Sigma, Phi Gamma Delta, Sigma Alpha Epsilon, and Sigma Nu fraternities. The college had two literary societies, the Philomathian Literary Society, established in 1856, and the Washington Literary Society, formed in 1858. It had yearbook called The Dasher, which became Blue & Gold in 1924. Its weekly newspaper was The Bethel Collegian and its monthly literary magazine was Blue & Gold.

In April 1858, on its Russellville campus, ten students united to form the eighth chapter of Sigma Alpha Epsilon, Kentucky Iota. Little is known about this chapter but by all accounts, letters and interviews reflected that through the years, the spirit of fraternity was alive and cherished by its members. As was often the case for many, the chapter's success ebbed and flowed with that of the school, which closed during the ensuing conflict (its members served in both the Union and the Confederate armies) and sadly surrendered its charter in 1920 when Bethel became a junior college.

== Sports ==
Bethel College's primary sport was baseball. It also had a basketball team that won 26 games in the 1926–1927 year. Bethel College had a football program from 1894 to 1931. Its colors were blue and gold and the teams were known as the Golden Bears.

== Notable alumni ==
- Ben M. Bogard, clergyman, founder of the American Baptist Association.
- Samuel Frauenthal, B.A. 1880, associate justice of the Arkansas Supreme Court
