= Jonesboro College =

Educational institution in Arkansas

Jonesboro College was an institution of learning located in Jonesboro, Arkansas. Founded in 1924 by the First Baptist Church of Blytheville, it closed in 1934.

Woodland College, an earlier attempt by the Baptists of Northeast Arkansas to support a college, had failed in 1912. But by 1919 local Jonesboro businessmen agreed to help raise funds for another attempt. The First Baptist Church of Blytheville provided starting funds. In 1920 bids were let for the construction of a building in south Jonesboro. By the fall of 1924 classes began for six teachers and 250 students in the new building.

It was a liberal arts junior college with courses in languages, mathematics, science, fine arts, and history. Its education department included a normal license course to train area teachers; its summer session provided an opportunity for those teachers to continue coursework. It offered commercial subjects to prepare students for business and office work. Important for the time, it offered a pre-medical course. To prepare younger students for college, it offered an academy.

While the city of Jonesboro and the Baptist Home Missions board were to jointly fund Jonesboro College, newspaper accounts show that it was in need of financial help almost immediately.

In 1934 Jonesboro College closed. After that it was sold to the Jonesboro school district, for whom it housed the high school. Heavily damaged by the 1973 Jonesboro tornado, it had to be razed.
