= Mississippi Delta Community College =

Community college in Moorhead, Mississippi, U.S.

Coordinates: 33°26′30″N 90°29′58″W

- Type: Public community college
- Established: 1926
- President: Steven J. Jones
- Students: 3,491
- Location: Moorhead, Mississippi, United States
- Campus: Rural
- Colors: Red, Black
- Mascot: Trojans
- Website: https://www.msdelta.edu/
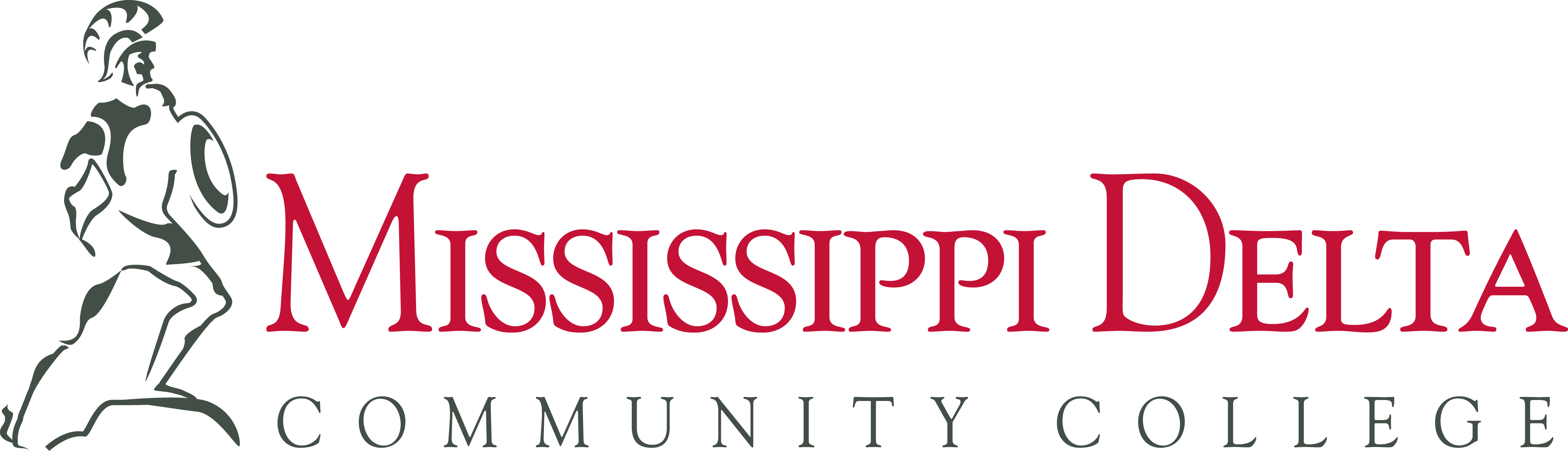

Mississippi Delta Community College is a public community college serving the Mississippi Delta region with its main campus in Moorhead, Mississippi. It also offers courses at locations in Greenville, Greenwood, and Indianola. Its mascot is the Trojan warrior. It has an enrollment of 3,491 students.

== History ==
Originally called Sunflower Junior College, the college was formed in conjunction with Sunflower County Agricultural High School in 1927. With its first freshman class enrolling that September, the college became a fully accredited junior college by the Accrediting Commission of the Senior Colleges of Mississippi in April 1928. The name was changed to Mississippi Delta Junior College in 1960 and to Mississippi Delta Community College in 1989.

== Service area ==
The official service area of the college includes Bolivar, Humphreys, Issaquena, Leflore, Sharkey, Sunflower, and Washington counties. Coahoma County was originally in the college's service area, but the Mississippi Legislature removed it effective July 1, 1995, and it is now served by the Coahoma Community College.

== Main campus ==
The majority of the main campus is in the Moorhead city limits. Some parts are in unincorporated areas.

=== Administrative and educational facilities ===
Stauffer-Wood Administration Building houses administrative functions. The 11,000-square-foot (1,000 m^{2}) facility is located on the southern border of the college and was named after Sherman Stauffer and Pete Wood, respectively an assistant to the president of the college and business manager, and a former agriculture teacher who had graduated from the college. The building was built as an armory of the National Guard and in 1997 was renovated into its current purpose.

The Jack E. Harper Jr. Science Building, built in 1998 and named after Jack E. Harper, Jr., a Sunflower County man who served on the college's board of trustees, houses science classes. Office space, eight laboratories, and nine classrooms are located in 26,700 square feet (2,480 m^{2}) of space.

Allen-Foley Career-Technical Complex houses career and technical education (CATE) classrooms and laboratories; it houses the Dr. Farilyn Bell ABE/GED Classroom which houses General Education Development (GED) and Adult Basic Education (ABE) classes. The building's namesakes, Otis W. Allen and Charles Foley, were a Leflore County man who served on the college's board of education and the dean of the Career-Technical Center of the college, respectively. The ABE/GED classroom was named after the college's first ABE and GED program director. Allen-Foley was built in 1977 and remodeled for GED and ABE classes in 2005.

The Horton Building, built in 1968, houses instructors' offices, two computer labs, classrooms, and laboratories. It was named after a previous president of the university, W. B. Horton.

Stanny Sanders Library, built in 1972, is the college's library. It was named after a Leflore County woman who was on the college's board of representatives. The facility; which has a room dedicated to the Community College Network, study rooms, a media center, and the College Center of Learning; has 482 seats available for patrons.

The Greer-Stafford Allied Health Building, built in 1993, houses medical and dental classes and laboratories; the 32,000-square-foot (3,000 m^{2}) Dr. Arthur Richter Dental Hygiene Clinic houses the dental hygiene classes. It was named after H.T. Greer and Sam Stafford, respectively a Sharkey County man who served on the college's board of trustees and a vice president. The dental hygiene clinic addition opened in 2001.

The Yeates Fine Arts Building, built in 1973, houses the college's fine arts classes and includes the M. E. Tharp Auditorium, Joe Abrams Band Hall, Jean Abrams Art Gallery, and Merle Tolbert Piano Lab. It was named after a music teacher, Mildred Yeates.

Tanner Hall, built in 1963, houses the MDCC Bookstore as well as classrooms and computer labs. Its namesake is a Sunflower County man who became a member of the college's board of trustees, E. A. Tanner. The college installed a computer lab in the building in 1994.

=== Student services and recreational facilities ===
The Vandiver Student Union houses the Office of Student Services, student government facilities, a locker room and sports facility, the Chief William P. Lacy Campus Police Office, the campus bookstore, and a student dining facility. The building itself was named after Sunflower Junior College's first president, Joseph S. Vandiver; and the police office was named after the college law enforcement agency's first chief of police.

The Boggs-Scroggins Student Services Center houses the Office of Admissions, the Office of Business Services, the Office of Financial Aid, the Office of Instruction, the Office of the President and other services such as counseling, human resources, institutional effectiveness, advising and information technology.

The Herman A. Thigpin Cafeteria, which has seating for over 400 students, was constructed in 1986 and named after an academic dean and science teacher. It has about 16,000 square feet (1,500 m^{2}) of area.

J.T. Hall Coliseum, constructed in 1976, houses the athletic director's offices; an about 1,000 seat multipurpose hall used for basketball games; the Helen Allen Dance Studio, a performing arts performance and practice area; and the Sports Hall of Fame Room. It was named after Dr. James Terry Hall, who once served as the president of the university.

The Jimmy Bellipanni Baseball Complex, named after an athletic director and coach at the college, was built in 1974. As of 2010 the complex's fence is made of cypress.

In 1980, the Carl & Brenda Grubb Women's Softball Field opened. It is located on the Moorhead campus, north of the coliseum. In 2015 a press box and concession stand were added.

The campus also includes the Maintenance Building.

There is a Baptist Student Union on the college grounds.

=== Residential facilities ===
Active dormitory buildings for students include Edwards-Stonestreet Residence Hall (for men) and Hargett-Lee Residence Hall (for women).

== Other campuses ==
Other campuses include:

- The MDCC Charles W. Capps Jr. Technology Center, a 30,000-square-foot (2,800 m^{2}) facility in Indianola, opened in 2001. It provides CATE education to businesses. It is named after the chairperson of the Mississippi House of Representatives Appropriations Committee, Charles W. Capps Jr., from Cleveland.
- Greenville Higher Education Center (GHEC), which has classes from MDCC and Mississippi Valley State University.
- Greenwood Center, occupying 10,000 square feet (930 m^{2}) of leased space on a facility on Park Avenue. It first opened in late 2003 in 5,000 square feet (460 m^{2}) of leased space in a facility in Downtown Greenwood; the lease agreement for that facility was signed early that year. In the Summer of 2005 the center moved to its current location.
