= Delta State Statesmen and Lady Statesmen =

Intercollegiate athletics teams of Delta State University

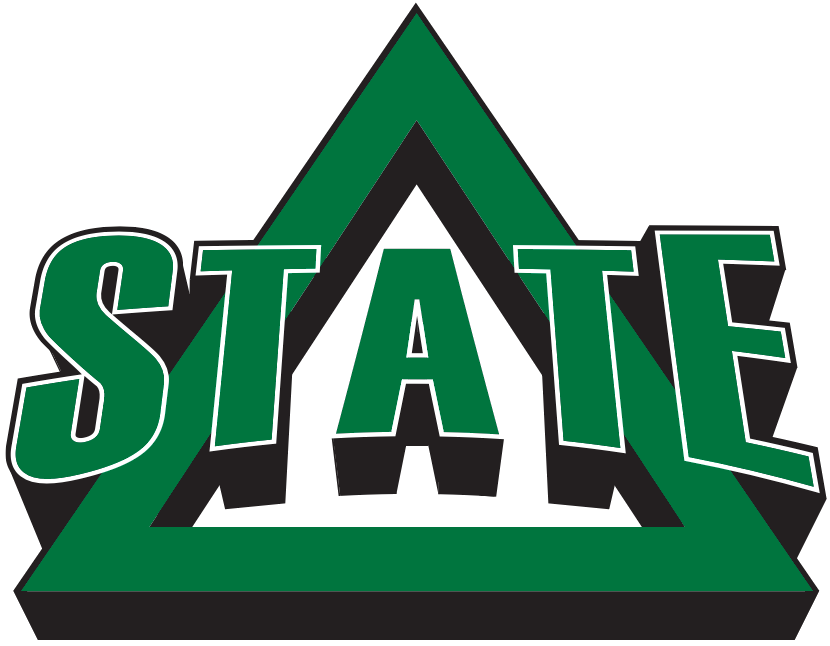
- University: Delta State University
- Conference: Gulf South
- NCAA: Division II
- Athletic director: Mike Kinnison
- Location: Cleveland, Mississippi
- Varsity teams: 14 (7 men's, 6 women's, 1 co-ed)
- Football stadium: Parker Field at McCool Stadium
- Basketball arena: Walter Sillers Coliseum
- Baseball stadium: Harvey Stadium at Ferriss Field
- Softball stadium: University Field
- Soccer stadium: Delta Field
- Aquatics center: Ronald G. Mayers Aquatics Center
- Tennis venue: Cleveland Country Club
- Mascot: Mr. Statesman
- Colors: Forest green and white
- Website: gostatesmen.com

Team NCAA championships
- 5

The Delta State Statesmen and Lady Statesmen are the athletic teams that represent Delta State University, located in Cleveland, Mississippi, in intercollegiate sports at the Division II level of the National Collegiate Athletic Association (NCAA). The Statesmen have primarily competed in the Gulf South Conference since the 1970–71 academic year.

Delta State competes in 15 intercollegiate varsity sports. Men's sports include baseball, basketball, cheerleading, football, golf, soccer, swimming and diving, and tennis; while women's sports include basketball, cheerleading, cross country, soccer, softball, swimming and diving, and tennis.

== Conference affiliations ==
- Gulf South Conference (1970–present)

== Varsity teams ==
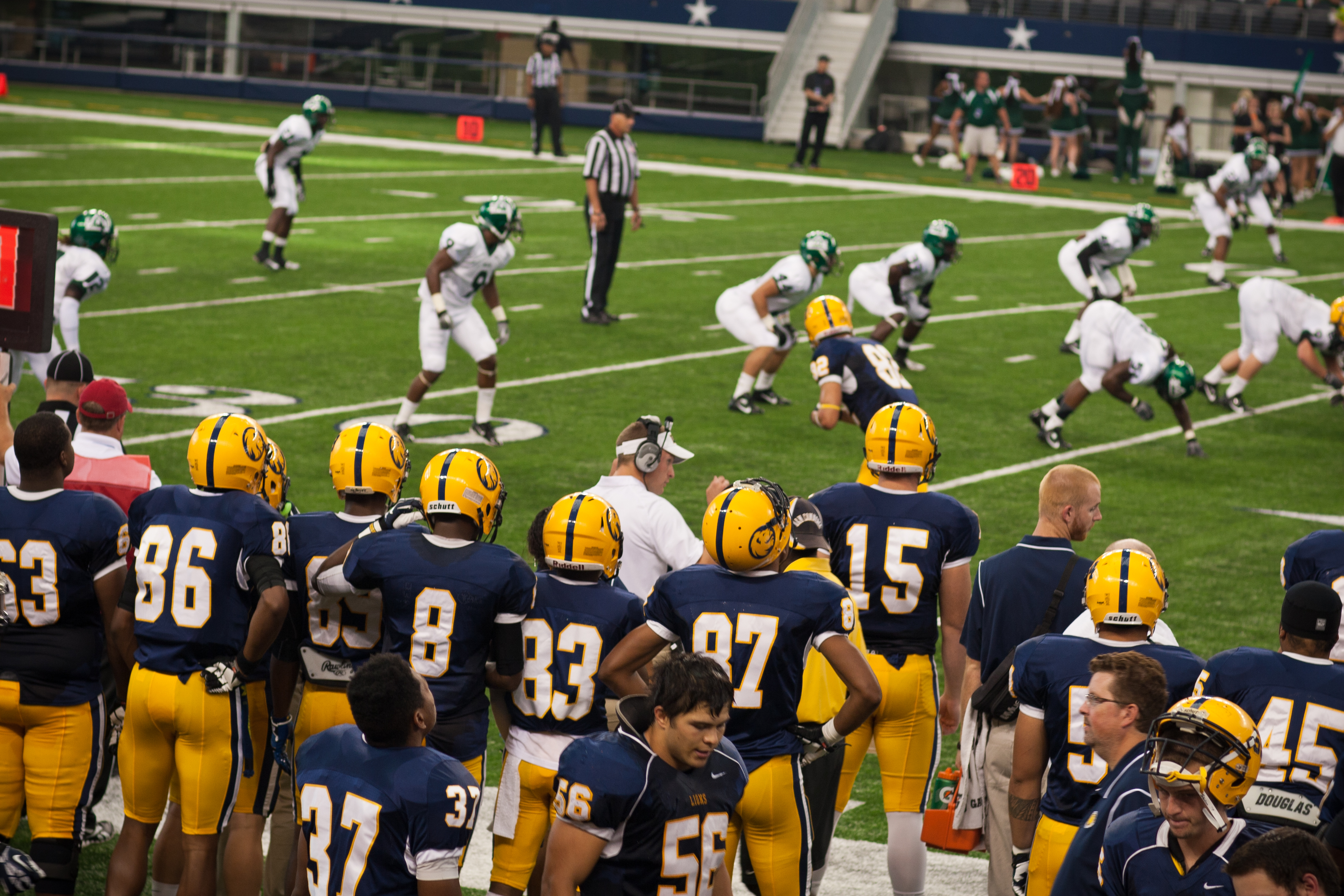
The Delta State football team in action against the Texas A&M–Commerce Lions in 2013

Men's sports	Women's sports
Baseball	Basketball
Basketball	Cheerleading
Cheerleading	Cross country
Football	Soccer
Golf	Softball
Soccer	Swimming and diving
Swimming and diving	Tennis
Tennis	

== Baseball ==
=== National Championships ===
Sport	Association	Division	Year	Opponent	Score
Baseball (1)	NCAA	Division II	2004	Grand Valley State	12–8
Football (1)	NCAA	Division II	2000	Bloomsburg	63–34

=== Draft ===
Delta State has had 34 Major League Baseball draft selections since the draft began in 1965.

Statesmen in the Major League Baseball Draft
Year	Player	Round	Team
1965	Joe DiFabio	1	Cardinals
1971	Steve Prestridge	6	Red Sox
1972	Mike Payne	1	Royals
1973	Mike Payne	1	Red Sox
1977	Stew Cliburn	4	Pirates
1978	Judson Thigpen	29	Tigers
1978	John Crawford	20	Tigers
1981	Barry Lyons	25	Tigers
1982	Christopher Burgess	16	Padres
1982	Barry Lyons	15	Mets
1987	Tom Hostetler	8	Giants
1988	Eddie Tucker	5	Giants
1994	Bubba Dixon	14	Padres
1995	Dave Townsend	49	Giants
1996	Andre Thompson	39	Red Sox
1996	Rodney Batts	22	Phillies
1996	Dave Townsend	6	Marlins
1998	Nathan Price	40	Royals
2000	Dee Haynes	14	Cardinals
2001	Eli Whiteside	6	Orioles
2003	Edwin Maysonet	19	Astros
2003	Dusty Hughes	11	Royals
2004	Mark Broome	41	Cardinals
2005	Brent Leach	6	Dodgers
2007	Jareck West	25	Athletics
2007	Brett Durand	11	Marlins
2008	Kenny Smalley	24	Athletics
2009	Devin Goodwin	33	Cardinals
2012	James Hudelson	28	White Sox
2012	Aaron Newcomb	19	Angels
2012	Brandon Hardin	10	White Sox
2013	Garrett Pickens	29	Blue Jays
2014	Carlos Leal	34	Brewers
2014	Taylor Stark	30	Brewers

== Women's basketball ==
The Lady Statesman began play in 1925. They are the only Division II team with 1,000 wins. They play in the Gulf South Conference. Delta State plays their home games at Walter Sillers Coliseum. They have made the NCAA Tournament 27 times, with a record of 57–25. They are coached by Craig Roden. Margaret Wade coached them to three AIAW National titles, while Lloyd Clark coached them to three Division II titles.

=== AIAW Championships ===
Association	Sport	Year
AIAW	Basketball	1975
AIAW	Basketball	1976
AIAW	Basketball	1977

=== NCAA Division II Championships ===
Association	Division	Sport	Year
NCAA	Division II	Basketball	1989
NCAA	Division II	Basketball	1990
NCAA	Division II	Basketball	1992

== Notable alumni ==
=== Baseball ===
- Trent Giambrone
- Greg Goff
- Brent Leach

=== Football ===
- George Chesser
- Pete Golding
- Jack Gregory
- Mark Hudspeth
- Anthony Maddox
- Aubrey Matthews
- Wilbur Myers
- Aubrey Rozzell

=== Men's basketball ===
- Thermon Blacklidge
- Sam Little
- Todd Mundt
- Scott Nagy
- Chico Potts
- Jeremy Richardson

=== Women's swimming and diving ===
- Gabriela Santis
