= Lambuth University =

Methodist college in Jackson, Tennessee, US

- Varnell-Jones Hall on the Lambuth College campus around the time of its completion in 1924
- Former names: Memphis Conference Female Institute (1843–1923); Lambuth College (1923–1991)
- Motto: Whatsoever Things Are True
- Type: Private university
- Active: 1843–2011
- Religious affiliation: United Methodist Church
- Location: Jackson, Tennessee, United States; 35.6237°N 88.8299°W
- Campus: 50 acres (0.202 km^{2}) Urban
- Colors: Blue & White
- Nickname: Eagles
- Sporting affiliations: NAIA – Independent; NCAA Division II – Independent (until 2011)
- Mascot: Eagles
- Website: lambuth.edu

Lambuth University was a private Methodist university in Jackson, Tennessee. It was active from 1843 to 2011 and was supported by the Memphis Annual Conference of the United Methodist Church. The university began as the Memphis Conference Female Institute in 1843 and was later renamed in honor of Walter Russell Lambuth (1854–1921), a Methodist missionary who traveled globally.

After several years of financial struggles, the Southern Association of Colleges and Schools opted not to renew Lambuth's accreditation in 2011. Due to both the financial and accreditation problems, the Board of Trustees voted in April 2011 to cease operations two months later. Final commencement exercises were held April 30, 2011. The University of Memphis acquired the campus which is now the Lambuth branch campus of the University of Memphis.

== Athletics ==
The Lambuth athletic teams were called the Eagles. They participated in dual membership with both the National Association of Intercollegiate Athletics (NAIA) and the NCAA Division II ranks, primarily competing as an NAIA Independent within the Association of Independent Institutions (AII) and an NCAA D-II Independent in transition as a provisional member from 2008–09 to 2010–11. The Eagles previously competed as full members for the TranSouth Athletic Conference (TranSouth or TSAC) from 2006–07 to 2007–08, and for the Mid-South Conference (MSC) from 1995–96 to 2005–06; both from the NAIA.

Lambuth competed in 11 intercollegiate sports: Men's sports included baseball, basketball, football, golf, soccer and tennis; while women's sports included basketball, golf, soccer, softball and tennis.

== Notable alumni ==
- Anthony Davis – former Tennessee State Representative
- Ron Dixon – professional football player
- William M. Greathouse – President of Trevecca Nazarene University, President of Nazarene Theological Seminary; General Superintendent in the Church of the Nazarene
- Ray King – professional baseball player
- Lee Hee-ho – First Lady of the Republic of Korea
- Adriane Lenox – Tony Award-winning actress
- James W. Moore – Methodist minister and author
- Stefan Rodgers – professional football player
- Brett Scallions – lead Singer of Fuel (band)
- Tia Sillers – Grammy Award-winning song writer
- Corey Webster – professional basketball player
- Antomius Wise – professional football player
