= Bethel University (Tennessee) =

Christian university in McKenzie, Tennessee, US

- Former names: Bethel Seminary (1842–1847); Bethel College (1847–2009)
- Type: Private university
- Established: 1842; 184 years ago
- Accreditation: Southern Association of Colleges and Schools
- Religious affiliation: Cumberland Presbyterian Church
- President: Perry Moulds, Ph.D.
- Dean: Cindy Mallard, Joseph Hames, Wayne Scott
- Students: 2,836
- Location: McKenzie, Tennessee, U.S. 36.1425°N 88.5151°W
- Colors: (Purple & Gold)
- Nickname: Wildcats
- Sporting affiliations: NAIA – Mid-South
- Mascot: Rowdy the Wildcat
- Website: bethelu.edu
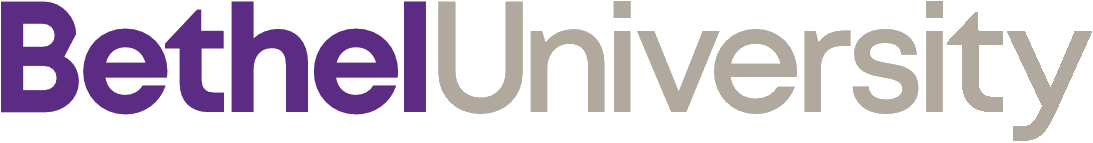

Bethel University is a private Cumberland Presbyterian-affiliated university in McKenzie, Tennessee with satellite campuses in Jackson, and Paris. It is accredited to award degrees up to the master's level.

== History ==
=== Founding in McLemoresville ===
Bethel Seminary was founded in 1842 in McLemoresville, Tennessee, and renamed to Bethel College in 1847. The seminary was overseen by the West Tennessee Synod of the Cumberland Presbyterian Church, who also oversaw 82 other schools at varying points in its own history. In 1851, the West Tennessee Synod founded a Theology Department at the school. This was prompted by other schools attempting to start theology departments in order to acquire more support from church leadership.

The school closed in 1861 due to the start of the American Civil War. The buildings were used as barracks by both the American and Confederate armies during the conflict. An interesting anecdote involved a large refracting telescope that was captured by the U.S. troops who thought it the barrel of a brass cannon. The telescope was later returned to the college by the troops and is still reportedly in the care of the college. The school reopened in 1869.

=== Move to McKenzie ===
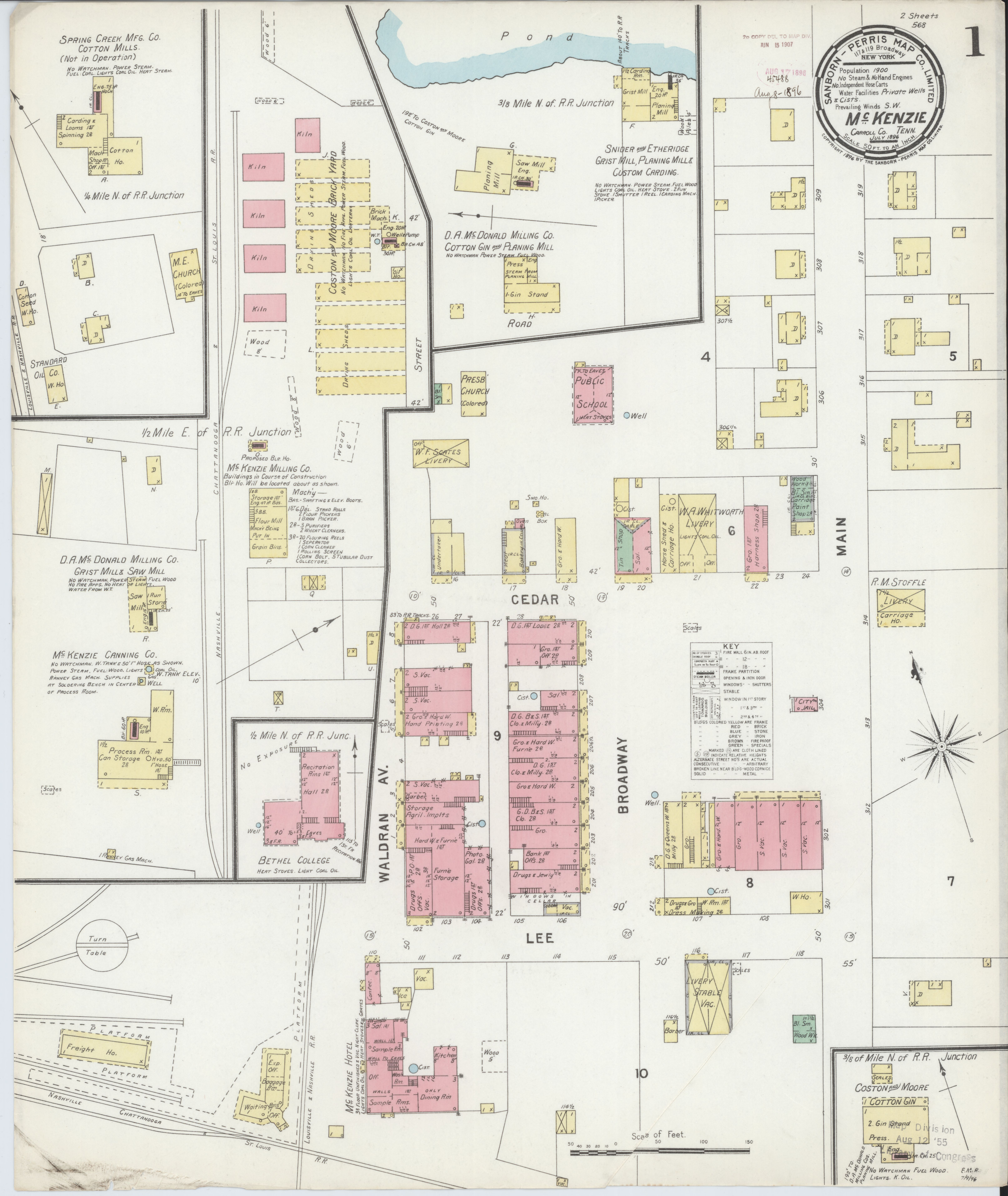
An 1889 Sanborn map of McKenzie, TN, showing the 2.5 story brick building constructed to house Bethel College in 1872

In 1872, Bethel President W.W. Hendrix led the initiative to move Bethel from McLemoresville to its current location in McKenzie, where the Nashville, Chattanooga & St. Louis Railway intersected the Louisville & Nashville Railway. A large, 2.5 story brick building was erected on the north side of town, on land purchased from local James M. McKenzie.

In the 1920s, the Cumberland Presbyterian Church implemented upgrades to the school, expanding the campus and curriculum. This was aided by a donation from the estate of Iowa businessman John T. Laughlin, who bequeathed $100k to the church in his will. From 1924 to 1928, an additional four buildings were constructed on the campus. The new administration building, a 2.5 story brick building, was designed by Missouri architect A. F. Lindsey.

In May 1975, comedian Bob Hope made an appearance at Bethel College as part of a fundraiser for the school.

=== Renamed to Bethel University ===
The school assumed its current name in 2009. On August 4, 2014, Bethel University and the Board of Trustees officially announced Walter Butler as its 40th president, a position he held on an interim basis since August 1, 2013 after longtime President Robert Prosser retired.

In the 2010s, Bethel University began renovating and building new facilities to accommodate its rapidly growing enrollment numbers. This included a new student center, football stadium, three new dorm buildings, and a new basketball arena. Additionally, the seminary, library, and old cafeteria buildings were extensively renovated to serve the changing needs of the school's academic programs.

On May 8, 2010, the university held a dedication service for its newest building, the Ray and Linda Morris Science Complex, featuring new laboratories, additional classrooms, and a lecture hall. Also dedicated that year was a new residence hall, University Hall, which houses up to 250 students.

June the following year saw the reopening of the Odom Hall math building after extensive renovations, along with Heritage Hall, a new three-story residence hall which was dedicated in August 2011.

The university's most ambitious construction plan also saw its first of four phases completed in August 2011. Phase I of the Vera Low Center for Student Enrichment features a new cafeteria, student services offices, bookstore, enrollment offices and a student activities room. Phase II of the Rosemary and Harry L. Crisp Arena, which opened in Spring 2012, consists of a new gymnasium, athletic training facilities, offices, and a fitness center for students, faculty, and general public. Phase III, the Cumberland Chapel, was under construction as of May 2012.

In conjunction with the Henry County Medical Center, in November 2012, Bethel University opened its new satellite campus for the Physician Assistant Program along with the medical centers' new Diagnostic Center.

== Student body ==
The bulk of students attending Bethel University are residents of Tennessee, but the student body typically represents students from 45 states and 25 countries. Bethel Seminary's enrollment in 1852 was 172. Bethel College's enrollment in 1955 was believed to be about 460 students. Bethel University student enrollment as of Fall 2017 consisted of 4,579 students.

== Academics ==
Bethel University consists of three colleges: the College of Arts & Sciences, the College of Professional Studies, and the College of Health Sciences. The university offers Associates, Bachelor of Arts, Bachelor of Science, Bachelor of Science in Nursing, Master of Arts, Master of Business Administration, and Master of Science degrees through a variety of academic programs. Since 1988, it has hosted the two-day academically based Hendrix Scholarship Competition offering full tuition and board for the winner, with full tuition for the runner up. Students who qualify may enter the Honors program, receiving a $10,000 scholarship per academic year.

Bethel University is accredited by the Southern Association of Colleges and Schools.

== Arts ==
Music, drama and performing arts are organized through a variety of entities within Bethel University. The academic branch of Bethel University houses the department of music, as well as the department of theatre. The department of music offers academic classes that fulfill requirements for graduation in the areas of music education, music performance, music business, and church music. Music performing ensembles found in the department of music include the Wildcat Marching Band, Academic Concert Symphonic Band, Academic Wind Ensemble, Percussion Ensemble, Brazilian Drum Ensemble, Brass Ensemble, Jazz Band, Choir (Bethel University Singers,) Chamber Choir, and various student-led performing groups. Students can receive healthy scholarships (regardless of their academic major) through membership in the Wildcat Marching Band, Wildcat Symphonic Band, and the Bethel University Singers. The department of theatre offers traditional performance experiences through productions that span through both fall and spring semesters.

Renaissance performance groups include: The Renaissance Choir, Vocal Authority, The Renaissance Quartet, The Renaissance Bluegrass Bands, Renaissance Theatre, Renaissance ACTS, and The Renaissance Regiment.

== Athletics ==
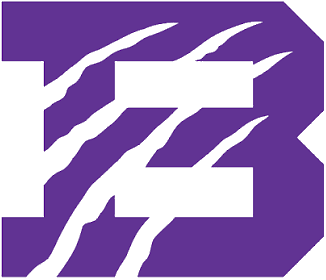
Bethel athletics monogram

The Bethel athletic teams are called the Wildcats. The university is a member of the National Association of Intercollegiate Athletics (NAIA), primarily competing in the Mid-South Conference (MSC) in all sports since the 2020–21 academic year (after spending a year as an affiliate member for certain sports from 2003–04 to 2019–20). Prior to joining the Mid-South as a full member, the Wildcats previously competed in the Southern States Athletic Conference (SSAC; formerly known as Georgia–Alabama–Carolina Conference (GACC) until after the 2003–04 school year) from 2013–14 to 2019–20; in the defunct TranSouth Athletic Conference (TranSouth or TSAC) from 2006–07 to 2012–13 (which they were a member on a previous stint from 1996–97 to 1997–98); and in the Kentucky Intercollegiate Athletic Conference (KIAC; now currently known as the River States Conference (RSC) since the 2016–17 school year) from 1998–99 to 2005–06; as well as being a charter member of the Volunteer State Athletic Conference (VSAC). Their mascot is the Wildcat.

Bethel competes in 21 intercollegiate varsity sports: Men's sports include baseball, basketball, cross country, football, golf, soccer, swimming, tennis, and track & field (indoor and outdoor); while women's sports include basketball, cross country, golf, soccer, softball, tennis, track & field (indoor and outdoor) and volleyball; and co-ed sports include archery, bass fishing, cheer, eSports and shooting sports. Former sports included, swimming, bowling, in-line hockey, triathlon, and dance.

=== Intramurals ===
Bethel offers intramural sports in a wide variety of areas. Activities include: beach volleyball, dodge ball, co-ed soccer, tennis, softball, flag football, basketball, and many other events.

=== Accomplishments ===
Some of the sport teams' accomplishments include:

- Men's Soccer – NAIA National Champions 2008. Played four of five years at the National Tournament.
- In-Line Hockey – D-I NCRHA National Champions in 2011–2012; SECRHL Southeastern Champions, NCRHA Final Four D-II in 2010.
- Bass Fishing – Southern Collegiate Champions for 2010–2011, Match Champions, Invitation Champions, first Triple Crown Champion.
- Women's Basketball – Three straight National Tournament appearances, ranked in “top ten” in the NAIA for 2010–2011.

== Notable alumni ==
- Sam Castronova, professional football player
- Gin Cooley (2015), model
- William Flatt
- Michael Jasper, former NFL player and current head coach at Stetson University
- Andrieus A. Jones
- Bob Mellow, Pennsylvania State Senator
