= Paint Bucket Bowl =

American college football rivalry

- Arkansas State Red Wolves Memphis Tigers
- Sport: Football
- First meeting: October 27, 1914; First District 18, West Tennessee 6
- Latest meeting: September 5, 2026; Memphis 42, Arkansas State 24
- Next meeting: September 11, 2027
- Trophy: None

Statistics
- Total meetings: 63
- All-time series: Memphis leads, 34–23–5
- Largest victory: West Tennessee, 68–0 (1922)
- Longest win streak: Memphis, 10 (1991–2004)
- Current win streak: Memphis, 6 (2013–present)

Locations of Arkansas State and Memphis

The Paint Bucket Bowl is the name given to the Arkansas State–Memphis football rivalry. It is a college football rivalry between the Arkansas State Red Wolves and the Memphis Tigers.

== History ==
The name of the rivalry was created when officials from the two schools decided to create a trophy for the winner of the game out of some buckets of paint and some paint brushes. The losing school also designed a particular area on its campus that the winner could smear with paint, in an attempt to eliminate the defacing of each campus and the "kidnapping" of opposing football players during game week. The tradition evolved into the winning school being given a trophy from the other—a paint bucket decorated in the colors of the two schools and inscribed with the game score. The two teams have met 62 times on the football field, with Memphis currently holding a 34–23–5 edge in the all-time series. The last meeting between the schools was in 2023. On May 20, 2020, it was announced that a further four-year extension of the series will begin in 2026.

== Game results ==
Arkansas State victories	Memphis victories	Tie games

No.	Date	Location	Winner	Score
1	October 27, 1914	Jonesboro, AR	First District	18–6
2	October 8, 1915	Jonesboro, AR	First District	41–0
3	November 30, 1916	Jonesboro, AR	First District	27–0
4	October 19, 1917	Jonesboro, AR	First District	19–0
5	November 28, 1918	Jonesboro, AR	West Tennessee	37–6
6	October 17, 1919	Jonesboro, AR	First District	6–0
7	October 11, 1920	Jonesboro, AR	First District	13–0
8	November 11, 1921	Jonesboro, AR	First District	19–0
9	November 24, 1922	Memphis, TN	West Tennessee	68–0
10	October 27, 1923	Jonesboro, AR	West Tennessee	6–0
11	October 9, 1925	Jonesboro, AR	First District A&M	19–0
12	October 9, 1926	Memphis, TN	First District A&M	7–0
13	November 5, 1927	Jonesboro, AR	First District A&M	9–6
14	November 3, 1928	Memphis, TN	West Tennessee State	19–14
15	November 1, 1929	Jonesboro, AR	West Tennessee State	6–0
16	November 1, 1930	Memphis, TN	First District A&M	13–6
17	October 30, 1931	Jonesboro, AR	First District A&M	14–6
18	November 2, 1932	Memphis, TN	Arkansas State	12–6
19	November 24, 1933	Jonesboro, AR	Tie	0–0
20	October 13, 1934	Memphis, TN	West Tennessee State	18–0
21	October 4, 1935	Jonesboro, AR	Arkansas State	18–0
22	October 1, 1938	Jonesboro, AR	West Tennessee State	38–2
23	September 29, 1939	Memphis, TN	Arkansas State	7–6
24	November 17, 1947	Memphis, TN	Tie	19–19
25	November 19, 1948	Memphis, TN	Memphis State	34–13
26	November 12, 1949	Jonesboro, AR	Memphis State	61–7
27	November 11, 1950	Memphis, TN	Memphis State	60–7
28	November 7, 1953	Memphis, TN	Arkansas State	20–0
29	October 30, 1954	Memphis, TN	Memphis State	26–7
30	October 29, 1955	Memphis, TN	Arkansas State	21–20
31	November 3, 1956	Memphis, TN	Memphis State	34–0
32	November 9, 1957	Memphis, TN	Memphis State	34–0
33	September 27, 1975	Memphis, TN	Arkansas State	29–10

No.	Date	Location	Winner	Score
34	October 4, 1980	Memphis, TN	Memphis State	24–3
35	November 27, 1982	Memphis, TN	Memphis State	12–0
36	November 19, 1983	Memphis, TN	Tie	14–14
37	September 1, 1984	Memphis, TN	Memphis State	17–2
38	September 13, 1986	Memphis, TN	Arkansas State	30–10
39	October 31, 1987	Memphis, TN	Tie	21–21
40	September 10, 1988	Memphis, TN	Memphis State	9–7
41	September 9, 1989	Memphis, TN	Arkansas State	17–13
42	September 1, 1990	Memphis, TN	Tie	24–24
43	September 21, 1991	Memphis, TN	Memphis State	31–21
44	October 17, 1992	Memphis, TN	Memphis State	37–7
45	October 9, 1993	Memphis, TN	Memphis State	45–3
46	October 15, 1994	Memphis, TN	Memphis	15–6
47	October 11, 1997	Memphis, TN	Memphis	38–9
48	October 31, 1998	Memphis, TN	Memphis	35–19
49	September 18, 1999	Memphis, TN	Memphis	31–26
50	September 16, 2000	Jonesboro, AR	Memphis	19–17
51	September 27, 2003	Memphis, TN	Memphis	38–16
52	September 18, 2004	Jonesboro, AR	No. 25 Memphis	47–35
53	October 14, 2006	Memphis, TN	Arkansas State^{†}	26–23
54	September 27, 2007	Jonesboro, AR	Arkansas State	35–31
55	September 27, 2008	Memphis, TN	Memphis	29–17
56	September 10, 2011	Jonesboro, AR	Arkansas State	47–3
57	September 8, 2012	Jonesboro, AR	Arkansas State	33–28
58	September 21, 2013	Memphis, TN	Memphis	31–7
59	September 5, 2020	Memphis, TN	Memphis	37–24
60	September 11, 2021	Jonesboro, AR	Memphis	55–50
61	September 17, 2022	Memphis, TN	Memphis	44–32
62	September 9, 2023	Jonesboro, AR	Memphis	37–3
63	September 5, 2026	Memphis, TN	Memphis	42–24
Series: Memphis leads 34–23–5
† Arkansas State vacated game

== See also ==
- List of NCAA college football rivalry games
