= List of Memphis Tigers in the NFL draft =

This is a list of Memphis Tigers football players in the NFL draft.

== Key ==
B	Back	K	Kicker	NT	Nose tackle
C	Center	LB	Linebacker	FB	Fullback
DB	Defensive back	P	Punter	HB	Halfback
DE	Defensive end	QB	Quarterback	WR	Wide receiver
DT	Defensive tackle	RB	Running back	G	Guard
E	End	T	Offensive tackle	TE	Tight end

== Selections ==
As of 2026, the Memphis football program has produced 140 NFL & AFL Draft picks. In 2020, Isaac Bruce became the first Memphis player inducted in to the Pro Football Hall of Fame. The Pro Football Hall of Fame currently ranks former Tiger Stephen Gostkowski as the sixth-best kicker in NFL history. Other notable former Memphis players include Andy Nelson, Dick Hudson, Harry Schuh, Tim Harris, DeAngelo Williams, and Dontari Poe.

Since 2019, the Memphis program has become known for producing a number of successful NFL running backs, including four drafted from 2019 to 2021 and two more signed as free agents in 2020 and 2024. In September 2021, sportscaster Dan Patrick dubbed Memphis the new "Running Back U". Of the five NFL running backs Memphis produced in this period, four played as starters: Darrell Henderson for Los Angeles, Antonio Gibson for Washington, Kenneth Gainwell for Philadelphia, and Tony Pollard for Dallas and Tennessee. Pollard was selected to the 2022 Pro Bowl in his fourth season.

currently active players are in bold

Year	Round	Pick	Overall	Player	Team	Position	Professional achievements
1951	16	10	193	Bill Robertson	Los Angeles Rams	E	
1953	22	4	257	Wayne Wood	Chicago Bears	T	
1954	24	7	284	Will Renfro	Washington Redskins	E	
1956	22	10	263	Joe Billings	Chicago Bears	T	
1957	11	5	126	Andy Nelson	Baltimore Colts	QB	Pro Bowl (1960), First Team All-Pro (1959), Second Team All-Pro (1958), 2× NFL Champion (1958, 1959)
1957	14	11	168	Bob Schmidt	Chicago Bears	B	
1958	25	3	292	Hal Divine	Philadelphia Eagles	T	
1958	26	4	305	Bob Lyles	Chicago Bears	B	
1961	3	8	36	James Earl Wright	Philadelphia Eagles	QB	
1961	14	2	106	James Earl Wright	Boston Patriots	QB	
1961	12	10	164	Donald Coffey	San Francisco 49ers	E	
1961	25	7	199	Donald Coffey	San Diego Chargers	E	
1962	2	8	16	Dick Hudson	San Diego Chargers	T	AFL All-Star (1965), 2× AFL Champion (1964, 1964), Bills All-1960s Team
1962	15	8	120	Fred Moore	San Diego Chargers	DT	
1962	10	13	135	Fred Moore	Baltimore Colts	T	
1962	18	8	144	Dennis Biodrowski	San Diego Chargers	G	AFL Champion (1966)
1962	16	11	221	Dennis Biodrowski	Cleveland Browns	G	
1963	4	1	43	John Griffin	Los Angeles Rams	B	
1963	8	5	61	John Griffin	Denver Broncos	B	
1963	27	4	212	Dick Quast	Buffalo Bills	G	
1963	16	5	215	Dick Quast	Baltimore Colts	G	
1963	16	12	222	Charlie Killett	New York Giants	B	
1963	29	4	228	Charlie Killett	Buffalo Bills	B	
1964	5	9	65	Charley Brooks	St. Louis Cardinals	E	
1964	14	3	107	Charley Brooks	New York Jets	E	
1964	18	3	139	Bill Scott	New York Jets	G	
1964	13	6	174	Russ Vollmer	Minnesota Vikings	B	
1964	23	5	181	John Evans	Buffalo Bills	T	
1964	17	9	233	John Evans	St. Louis Cardinals	T	
1965	1	3	3	Harry Schuh	Oakland Raiders	DT	Pro Bowl (1970), 2× AFL All-Star (1967, 1969), All-AFL (1969), AFL Champion (1967), Raiders All-Time Team
1965	5	13	65	Doug Woodlief	Los Angeles Rams	E	
1965	11	13	153	Olie Cordill	Cleveland Browns	B	
1966	5	8	41	Bob Sherlag	Buffalo Bills	WR	
1966	6	4	84	Bob Sherlag	Philadelphia Eagles	WR	
1966	12	4	104	Harry Day	Houston Oilers	DE	
1966	15	4	219	Harry Day	Philadelphia Eagles	T	
1966	17	13	258	Dave Hathcock	Green Bay Packers	DB	Super Bowl champion (I), NFL champion (1966)
1968	5	26	137	Francis Winkler	Green Bay Packers	DE	
1968	7	21	168	Dale Brady	Cleveland Browns	RB	
1968	11	16	289	Rich Coady	Chicago Bears	TE	
1968	14	5	359	Herb Covington	New Orleans Saints	RB	
1968	14	7	361	Chuck DeVeliegher	Buffalo Bills	DT	
1968	15	19	400	Bob Baxter	Cleveland Browns	WR	
1969	17	16	432	Joe Rushing	San Francisco 49ers	LB	
1970	5	17	121	Danny Pierce	Washington Redskins	RB	
1970	5	19	123	Bob Parker	Detroit Lions	G	
1970	9	9	217	Preston Riley	San Francisco 49ers	WR	
1970	10	6	240	Steve Jaggard	Philadelphia Eagles	DB	
1970	16	19	409	Jerry Todd	Detroit Lions	DB	
1971	12	15	301	James Hayden	Cincinnati Bengals	DE	
1971	14	21	359	David Vaughn	Miami Dolphins	TE	
1971	17	24	440	John Bomer	Dallas Cowboys	C	
1972	5	25	129	Charlie Babb	Miami Dolphins	DB	
1972	7	17	173	Ray Jamieson	Oakland Raiders	RB	
1972	13	16	328	John Kirschner	Detroit Lions	TE	
1973	11	8	268	Jay Douglas	San Diego Chargers	C	
1973	13	3	315	Stan Davis	Philadelphia Eagles	WR	
1974	3	10	62	Cliff Taylor	Chicago Bears	RB	
1975	9	16	224	Everett Taylor	New York Jets	DB	
1975	17	21	437	Carl Taylor	Washington Redskins	DE	
1976	15	10	413	Jerry Dandridge	Green Bay Packers	LB	
1976	16	18	449	Mike Fuhrman	Baltimore Colts	TE	
1977	1	24	24	Bob Rush	San Diego Chargers	C	
1977	3	24	80	Terdell Middleton	St. Louis Cardinals	RB	Pro Bowl (1978)
1977	4	20	104	Eric Harris	Kansas City Chiefs	DB	
1977	4	23	107	Earl Jones	Los Angeles Rams	DE	
1977	6	4	143	Bob Jordan	New York Giants	T	
1978	1	9	9	Keith Simpson	Seattle Seahawks	DB	
1978	2	8	36	Keith Butler	Seattle Seahawks	LB	2× Super Bowl champion (XL, XLIII)
1978	5	12	122	Keith Wright	Cleveland Browns	WR	
1979	2	8	36	Earnest Gray	New York Giants	WR	
1979	2	26	54	Eddie Hill	Los Angeles Rams	RB	
1979	7	12	177	Judson Flint	New England Patriots	DB	
1980	12	5	310	James Stewart	Green Bay Packers	DB	
1981	12	22	326	Keith Clark	Buffalo Bills	LB	
1983	2	28	56	Richard Williams	Washington Redskins	RB	
1984	1	24	24	Derrick Crawford	San Francisco 49ers	WR	
1985	1	14	14	Derrick Burroughs	Buffalo Bills	DB	
1985	3	10	66	Tim Long	Minnesota Vikings	T	
1985	3	11	67	Donnie Elder	New York Jets	DB	
1985	6	19	159	Jack Oliver	New York Giants	G	
1985	10	28	280	James Bowers	Seattle Seahawks	DB	
1985	11	8	288	Punkin Williams	Tampa Bay Buccaneers	RB	
1986	3	15	70	Jeff Walker	San Diego Chargers	T	
1986	4	2	84	Tim Harris	Green Bay Packers	LB	Pro Bowl (1989), 2× First-Team All-Pro (1988, 1989), Super Bowl champion (XXIX)
1986	6	14	152	Gary Hunt	Cincinnati Bengals	DB	
1986	8	4	198	Trell Hooper	Indianapolis Colts	DB	
1987	3	4	60	David Brandon	Buffalo Bills	LB	
1988	7	12	177	Tim Borcky	Buffalo Bills	T	
1988	9	12	233	Scott Dill	Phoenix Cardinals	T	
1989	7	17	184	Mike Nettles	Seattle Seahawks	DB	
1989	10	24	275	Greg Ross	Miami Dolphins	DT	
1989	12	2	309	James Cribbs	Detroit Lions	DE	
1989	12	21	328	Marlon Brown	Cleveland Browns	LB	
1990	5	23	132	Charles Wilson	Green Bay Packers	WR	
1990	8	2	195	Tory Epps	Atlanta Falcons	DT	
1991	5	15	126	Reggie Jones	New Orleans Saints	DB	
1991	5	24	135	Jeff Fite	Green Bay Packers	P	
1991	6	5	144	Eduardo Vega	Phoenix Cardinals	T	
1993	4	27	111	Russell Copeland	Buffalo Bills	WR	
1993	8	10	206	Jeff Buffaloe	Los Angeles Rams	P	
1994	2	4	33	Isaac Bruce	Los Angeles Rams	WR	4× Pro Bowl (1996, 1999–2001), Second-Team All-Pro (1999), Super Bowl champion (XXXIV), NFL Receiving Yards Leader (1996), Pro Football Hall of Fame
1994	5	23	154	Tony Semple	Detroit Lions	G	
1994	7	5	199	Steve Matthews	Kansas City Chiefs	QB	
1995	4	11	109	Ken Irvin	Buffalo Bills	DB	
1996	1	28	28	Jerome Woods	Kansas City Chiefs	DB	Pro Bowl (2003)
1997	5	21	151	Tony Williams	Minnesota Vikings	DT	
1997	6	37	200	Richard Hogans	Chicago Bears	LB	
1997	7	32	233	Marvin Thomas	Chicago Bears	DE	
1999	3	26	87	Mike McKenzie	Green Bay Packers	DB	Super Bowl champion (XLIV)
2001	2	6	37	Idrees Bashir	Indianapolis Colts	DB	
2001	2	23	54	Michael Stone	Arizona Cardinals	DB	
2001	4	28	123	Marcus Bell	Arizona Cardinals	DT	
2003	3	14	78	Wade Smith	Miami Dolphins	T	Pro Bowl (2012)
2003	7	46	260	Travis Anglin	Detroit Lions	WR	
2004	7	11	212	Eric Taylor	Pittsburgh Steelers	DT	
2006	1	27	27	DeAngelo Williams	Carolina Panthers	RB	Pro Bowl (2009), Second-Team All-Pro (2008), 2× NFL Rushing Touchdowns leader (2008, 2015)
2006	4	21	118	Stephen Gostkowski	New England Patriots	K	4× Pro Bowl (2008, 2013–2015), 2× First-Team All-Pro (2008, 2015), NFL Record 479 Consecutive Extra Points made, 3× Super Bowl champion (XLIX, LI, LIII)
2007	5	3	140	Brandon McDonald	Cleveland Browns	CB	
2009	7	40	249	Clinton McDonald	Cincinnati Bengals	DE	Super Bowl champion (XLVIII)
2012	1	11	11	Dontari Poe	Kansas City Chiefs	DT	2× Pro Bowl (2013, 2014), Second-Team All-Pro (2013)
2014	7	41	256	Lonnie Ballentine	Houston Texans	DB	
2015	5	9	145	Bobby McCain	Miami Dolphins	CB	
2015	7	10	227	Martin Ifedi	St. Louis Rams	DE	
2016	1	26	26	Paxton Lynch	Denver Broncos	QB	
2017	5	9	153	**Jake Elliott**	Cincinnati Bengals	K	Pro Bowl (2021), Super Bowl champion (LII)
2018	2	19	51	Anthony Miller	Chicago Bears	WR	
2018	5	13	150	Genard Avery	Cleveland Browns	LB	
2019	3	6	70	Darrell Henderson	Los Angeles Rams	RB	Super Bowl champion (LVI)
2019	4	26	128	**Tony Pollard**	Dallas Cowboys	RB	Pro Bowl (2022)
2020	3	2	66	**Antonio Gibson**	Washington Redskins	RB	
2020	7	9	223	Chris Claybrooks	Jacksonville Jaguars	DB	
2020	7	16	230	Dustin Woodard	New England Patriots	C	
2021	5	6	150	**Kenneth Gainwell**	Philadelphia Eagles	RB	
2022	3	26	90	**Dylan Parham**	Las Vegas Raiders	OG	
2022	4	33	138	**Calvin Austin**	Pittsburgh Steelers	WR	
2025	7	41	257	**Kobee Minor**	New England Patriots	DB	
2026	4	17	117	**Travis Burke**	Los Angeles Chargers	T	

== Undrafted Free Agents ==
Draft year	Player	First Team	Position	Professional achievements
1960	Dave Strickland	Denver Broncos	G	
1965	John Bramlett	Denver Broncos	LB	2× AFL All-Star
1966	Billy Fletcher	Denver Broncos	DB	
1978	James Thompson	New York Giants	WR	
1978	William Cesare	Tampa Bay Buccaneers	DB	
1980	Ken Dunek	Philadelphia Eagles	TE	
1982	Rick Ackerman	San Diego Chargers	DT	
1984	Darrell Nelson	Pittsburgh Steelers	TE	
1984	Stan Adams	Los Angeles Raiders	LB	
1985	Derrick Burroughs	Buffalo Bills	DB	
1986	Eric Fairs	Houston Oilers	LB	
1987	Jeff Womack	Minnesota Vikings	RB	
1987	Edwin Lovelady	New York Giants	WR	
1987	Enis Jackson	Cleveland Browns	DB	
1987	David Brandon	San Diego Chargers	LB	
1987	Don Bramlett	Minnesota Vikings	DT	
1987	Dennis Borcky	New York Giants	NT	
1991	Glenn Rogers	Tampa Bay Buccaneers	DB	
1995	James Logan	Cincinnati Benglas	LB	
1996	Marcus Holliday	St. Louis Rams	RB	
1999	Mac Cody	Indianapolis Colts	WR	
2000	Darrius Blevins	St. Louis Rams	WR	Super Bowl champion (XXXIV)
2000	Reggie Howard	Oakland Raiders	DB	
2003	Artis Hicks	Philadelphia Eagles	G/T	
2003	Dante Brown	Pittsburgh Steelers	RB	
2004	Tony Brown	Carolina Panthers	DE	
2007	Robert Douglas	Tennessee Titans	RB	
2010	Duke Calhoun	New York Giants	WR	
2011	Kellen Heard	Oakland Raiders	DT	
2012	Ronald Leary	Dallas Cowboys	G	
2013	Robert Steeples	St. Louis Rams	CB	
2014	Akeem Davis	Washington Redskins	S	
2014	Marcus Ball	New Orleans Saints	S	
2014	Jordan Devey	Baltimore Ravens	T	Super Bowl champion (XLIX)
2016	Alan Cross	Tampa Bay Buccaneers	TE	
2016	Wynton McManis	San Francisco 49ers	LB	
2017	Mose Frazier	Denver Broncos	WR	
2017	Arthur Maulet	New Orleans Saints	CB	
2019	Tevin Jones	Houston Texans	WR	
2020	Bryce Huff	New York Jets	LB	
2020	Patrick Taylor	Green Bay Packers	RB	
2021	Riley Patterson	Detroit Lions	K	
2021	Damonte Coxie	Green Bay Packers	WR	2× CFL Grey Cup champion (2022, 2024)
2022	J.J. Russell	Tampa Bay Buccaneers	LB	
2022	Cobi Francis	Houston Texans	CB	
2023	Quindell Johnson	Los Angeles Rams	S	
2024	Joseph Scates	Jacksonville Jaguars	WR	
2024	Blake Watson	Denver Broncos	RB	
2025	Seth Henigan	Jacksonville Jaguars	QB	
2025	Chandler Martin	Baltimore Ravens	WR	
2025	Roc Taylor	Pittsburgh Steelers	WR	
