= 2019 Memphis Tigers football team =

American college football season

2019 Memphis Tigers football

AAC champion AAC West Division co-champion

AAC Championship Game, W 29–24 vs. Cincinnati

Cotton Bowl Classic, L 39–53 vs. Penn State
- Conference: American Athletic Conference
- West Division

Ranking
- Coaches: No. 17
- AP: No. 17
- Record: 12–2 (7–1 AAC)
- Head coach: Mike Norvell (4th season; regular season); Ryan Silverfield (interim; bowl game)
- Offensive coordinator: Kevin Johns (1st season)
- Offensive scheme: Spread
- Defensive coordinator: Adam Fuller (1st season)
- Base defense: 4–3
- Home stadium: Liberty Bowl Memorial Stadium

2019 American Athletic Conference football standings
| | Conf. | | | Overall |
| Team | W | | L | W | | L |
|---|---|---|---|---|---|---|
East Division
| No. 21 Cincinnati xy | 7 | – | 1 | 11 | – | 3 |
| No. 24 UCF | 6 | – | 2 | 10 | – | 3 |
| Temple | 5 | – | 3 | 8 | – | 5 |
| South Florida | 2 | – | 6 | 4 | – | 8 |
| East Carolina | 1 | – | 7 | 4 | – | 8 |
| UConn | 0 | – | 8 | 2 | – | 10 |
West Division
| No. 17 Memphis xy$ | 7 | – | 1 | 12 | – | 2 |
| No. 20 Navy x | 7 | – | 1 | 11 | – | 2 |
| SMU | 6 | – | 2 | 10 | – | 3 |
| Tulane | 3 | – | 5 | 7 | – | 6 |
| Houston | 2 | – | 6 | 4 | – | 8 |
| Tulsa | 2 | – | 6 | 4 | – | 8 |
Championship: Memphis 29, Cincinnati 24
$ – Conference champion; x – Division champion/co-champions; y – Championship game participant; Rankings from AP Poll

The 2019 Memphis Tigers football team represented the University of Memphis in the 2019 NCAA Division I FBS football season. The Tigers played their home games at Liberty Bowl Memorial Stadium in Memphis, Tennessee, and competed in the West Division of the American Athletic Conference. They were led by fourth-year head coach Mike Norvell through the team's win in the American Championship Game, after which he left to fill the head coaching vacancy at Florida State. It was the first outright/unshared conference championship in 50 seasons. The team lost only two games, a regular season match-up against Temple and their bowl game against Penn State. Offensive line coach Ryan Silverfield was initially named head coach of the team for their bowl game, the Cotton Bowl; the interim tag was removed and he was named the new head coach of the Tigers.

== Preseason ==
=== Award watch lists ===
Listed in the order that they were released

| Award | Player | Position | Year |
|---|---|---|---|
| Maxwell Award | Patrick Taylor | RB | SR |
| Bednarik Award | Bryce Huff | DE | SR |
| Doak Walker Award | Patrick Taylor | RB | SR |
| Fred Biletnikoff Award | Damonte Coxie | WR | RS JR |
| John Mackey Award | Joey Magnifico | TE | RS SR |
| Rimington Trophy | Dustin Woodard | C | SR |
| Jim Thorpe Award | T. J. Carter | CB | JR |
| Outland Trophy | Dustin Woodard | C | SR |
| Bronko Nagurski Trophy | Bryce Huff | DE | SR |
| Lou Groza Award | Riley Patterson | PK | JR |
| Wuerffel Trophy | Brady White | QB | RS JR |
| Johnny Unitas Golden Arm Award | Brady White | QB | RS JR |
| Manning Award | Brady White | QB | RS JR |

=== AAC media poll ===
The AAC media poll was released on July 16, 2019, with the Tigers predicted as repeat to win the AAC West Division and finish in third place of AAC championship.

== Personnel ==
=== Depth chart ===
Defense

FS
La'Andre Thomas
Carlito Gonzalez

| WLB | MLB | SLB |
|---|---|---|
| J. J. Russell; Zay Cullens | Tim Hart | Austin Hall |
| ⋅ | Josh Perry | Thomas Pickens; Nehemiah Augustus |

SS
Tyrez Lindsey
Sanchez Blake Jr.

CB
T. J. Carter
John Broussard

| DE | DT | DT | DE |
|---|---|---|---|
| Bryce Huff | Joseph Dorceus | O'Bryan Goodson | Jonathan Wilson |
| Wardalis Ducksworth | Cade Mashburn | John Tate | Everitt Cunningham |

CB
Chris Claybrooks
Jacobi Francis

Offense

"X" WR
John Williams
Rodrigues Clark

"Z" WR
Antonio Gibson
Calvin Austin

| LT | LG | C | RG | RT |
|---|---|---|---|---|
| Obinna Eze | Dylan Parham | Dustin Woodard | Manuel Orona-Lopez | Scottie Dill |
| Titus Jones | ⋅ | Issac Ellis | Evan Fields | Peyton Jones |

"Y" TE
Joey Magnifico
Sean Dykes
Tyce Daniel

"S" WR
Damonte Coxie
Kedarian Jones

QB
Brady White
Connor Adair

RB
Patrick Taylor
Kenneth Gainwell

Special teams
PK Riley Patterson
P Adam Williams
KR Kenny Gainwell
PR John Williams
T. J. Carter
H Preston Brady

=== Roster ===
2019 Memphis Tigers football team roster
Players
Coaches
Offense

| Pos. | # | Name | Class |
|---|---|---|---|
| WR | 1 | Traveon Samuel | Sr |
| QB | 3 | Brady White | Jr |
| WR | 5 | Sean Dykes | Sr |
| RB | 6 | Patrick Taylor | Sr |
| QB | 7 | Markevion Quinn | So |
| QB | 8 | Connor Adair | So |
| WR | 9 | Pop Williams | Sr |
| WR | 10 | Damonte Coxie | Jr |
| QB | 11 | Sheldon Layman | Fr |
| WR | 13 | Kedarian Jones | Sr |
| WR | 14 | Antonio Gibson | Sr |
| TE | 15 | Drew Martin | Fr |
| QB | 16 | Sky Forest | Fr |
| RB | 17 | Kylan Watkins | So |
| WR | 18 | Tahj Washington | Fr |
| RB | 19 | Kenneth Gainwell | Fr |
| RB | 21 | Timothy Taylor | So |
| RB | 24 | Cameron Fleming | Fr |
| RB | 25 | Rodrigues Clark | Fr |
| RB | 26 | Marquavius Weaver | Sr |
| WR | 38 | Jordan Monk | Fr |
| RB | 43 | Mario Nolan–Dillard | So |
| TE | 45 | Kameron Wilson | Fr |
| WR | 48 | Dylan Ingram | Fr |
| TE | 50 | Jared Edwards | Fr |
| OL | 52 | Peyton Jones | Sr |
| OL | 53 | Dustin Woodard | Sr |
| OL | 56 | Dylan Parham | So |
| OL | 57 | Nigel Brannon | So |
| OL | 61 | Josh Northcutt | Fr |
| OL | 65 | Jake Stopkotte | Fr |
| OL | 67 | Manuel Orona–Lopez | Jr |
| OL | 68 | Nathan Bradley | Fr |
| OL | 70 | Jacob Likes | Fr |
| OL | 71 | Evan Fields | Fr |
| OL | 73 | Titus Jones | Fr |
| OL | 74 | Issac Ellis | Fr |
| OL | 75 | Matt Dale | Jr |
| OL | 76 | Blaine Bishop | Fr |
| OL | 77 | Obinna Eze | So |
| OL | 78 | Nick Metzinger | Fr |
| OL | 79 | Scottie Dill | Sr |
| WR | 80 | Coye' Fairman | So |
| WR | 81 | Javon Ivory | Fr |
| WR | 82 | Cameron Baker | Fr |
| TE | 83 | John Hassell | So |
| WR | 84 | Calvin Austin | So |
| TE | 86 | Joey Magnifico | Sr |
| WR | 87 | Jeremy Tate Jr. | Fr |
| TE | 88 | Tyce Daniel | So |
| WR | 89 | Tyler Moore | So |

Defense

| Pos. | # | Name | Class |
|---|---|---|---|
| DL | 1 | O'Bryan Goodson | Fr |
| DB | 2 | T. J. Carter | Jr |
| LB | 3 | Keith Brown Jr. | Jr |
| DB | 4 | Josh Perry | Jr |
| DE | 5 | Everitt Cunningham | Jr |
| DL | 6 | Kayode Oladele | Fr |
| DB | 7 | Chris Claybrooks | Jr |
| LB | 8 | Zay Cullens | So |
| DB | 9 | John Broussard Jr. | Jr |
| DB | 11 | Joey Bryant | Sr |
| DB | 12 | La'Andre Thomas | So |
| DL | 13 | Jalil Clemons | Fr |
| DB | 15 | Quindell Johnson | Fr |
| LB | 16 | Nehemiah Augustus | Jr |
| DB | 18 | Gabriel Rogers | Jr |
| DB | 22 | Tyrez Lindsey | Jr |
| DB | 23 | J. J. Russell | Jr |
| DB | 25 | Austin Hall | Sr |
| LB | 26 | Cade Mashburn | So |
| DB | 27 | Maliek Stallings | Fr |
| DB | 28 | Troy Hurst | Fr |
| DB | 29 | Carlito Gonzalez | Jr |
| DB | 30 | Rodney Owens | So |
| DB | 31 | Austin Jones | Fr |
| DB | 32 | Jacobi Francis | Jr |
| LB | 34 | Tyler Garvey | So |
| LB | 35 | Tim Hart | Jr |
| DB | 36 | Ladarius Jordan | Sr |
| DE | 37 | Jaylon Allen | Fr |
| DL | 38 | Jonathan Wilson | Sr |
| DB | 39 | Harold Nash III | Fr |
| DB | 40 | Thomas Pickens | Jr |
| DB | 41 | Sanchez Blake Jr. | So |
| LB | 43 | Ja'Len Sims | Fr |
| DB | 44 | Kendell Johnson | Fr |
| DB | 45 | Raymond Fracchia | Fr |
| DE | 46 | Cole Mashburn | Fr |
| DB | 47 | Colton Cochran | Jr |
| DE | 50 | Joseph Honeysucker | Fr |
| LB | 52 | Matthew Rhodes | Fr |
| LB | 53 | Nyle Love | Fr |
| DL | 54 | J'Len Smith | So |
| DE | 55 | Bryce Huff | Sr |
| DE | 56 | Cortez Love | Fr |
| LB | 57 | Andrew Lawton | Fr |
| LB | 58 | Will Gusmus | Fr |
| DL | 59 | Chandler Stump | Jr |
| DL | 90 | John Tate | Jr |
| DE | 92 | Jeremiah Maclin | Jr |
| DL | 93 | Desmond Hawkins | Sr |
| DL | 94 | Joseph Dorceus | Jr |
| DL | 95 | Keith Brigham | Sr |
| DL | 97 | Wardalis Ducksworth | So |
| DL | 99 | Braylon Brown | So |

Special teams

| Pos. | # | Name | Class |
|---|---|---|---|
| PK | 36 | Riley Patterson | Jr |
| LS | 42 | Preston Brady | Jr |
| P | 48 | Adam Williams | So |
| LS | 49 | Treysen Neal | So |

Head coach

- Mike Norvell

Coordinators/assistant coaches

- Adam Fuller (defensive coordinator)
- Kevin Johns (offensive coordinator / quarterbacks)
- Pete Lembo (assistant head coach / special teams coordinator)
- John Simon (recruiting coordinator / passing game coordinator / assistant coach / wide receivers)
- Anthony Jones (assistant coach / running backs)
- Tony Tokarz (assistant coach / tight ends)
- Kevin Clune (assistant coach / linebackers)
- Tim Edwards (assistant coach / defensive line)
- Ryan Silverfield (deputy head coach / run game coordinator / offensive line)
- T.J. Rushing (assistant coach / defensive backs / pass game coordinator)
- Jeff Kupper (director, football operations)
- Dan Allen (graduate assistant - defensive line)
- Carlos Locklyn (director of high school relations)
- Steven Mizell (director of player relations)
- Braxton Brady (team chaplain)
- Cortez Carter (graduate assistant, defensive back)
- Alan Cross (graduate assistant, offensive line)
- Joel Elliot (graduate assistant, defense)
- Cory Zink (director of football video)
- Marc Hohorst (equipment manager)
- David Draper (athletic equipment assistant)
- Marcus Bell (director of community & tiger alumni relations)
- Sherman Morris (director of recruiting operations)
- Akoya Nelson (assistant to the director of recruiting)
- Justin Crouse (director of player personnel)
- Josh Storms (strength and conditioning coach)
- Larry Reynolds (senior assistant athletic trainer)
- Sherri Schwartz (assistant to the head coach)
- Darrell Turner (associate athletic director for sports medicine)
- Nate Fichtner (analyst)
- Cooper Williams (offensive analyst)
- Chase Robison (defensive analyst)
- Jalan Sowell (student assistant)
- Jake Wilcox (student volunteer)
- John Cotton (quality control)
- David Glidden (quality control)

Legend

- (C) Team captain
- (S) Suspended
- (I) Ineligible
- Injured
- Redshirt

Roster

== Schedule ==
| Date | Time | Opponent | Rank | Site | TV | Result | Attendance |
|---|---|---|---|---|---|---|---|
| August 31 | 11:00 a.m. | Ole Miss* | | Liberty Bowl Memorial Stadium; Memphis, TN (rivalry) | ABC | W 15–10 | 44,107 |
| September 7 | 11:00 a.m. | Southern* | | Liberty Bowl Memorial Stadium; Memphis, TN | WMC | W 55–24 | 34,487 |
| September 14 | 2:30 p.m. | at South Alabama* | | Ladd–Peebles Stadium; Mobile, AL | ESPNU | W 42–6 | 12,373 |
| September 26 | 7:00 p.m. | Navy | | Liberty Bowl Memorial Stadium; Memphis, TN | ESPN | W 35–23 | 33,909 |
| October 5 | 2:45 p.m. | at Louisiana–Monroe* | | Malone Stadium; Monroe, LA | ESPNU | W 52–33 | 17,143 |
| October 12 | 11:00 a.m. | at Temple | No. 23 | Lincoln Financial Field; Philadelphia, PA | ESPN2 | L 28–30 | 34,253 |
| October 19 | 6:00 p.m. | Tulane | | Liberty Bowl Memorial Stadium; Memphis, TN | ESPN2 | W 47–17 | 30,221 |
| October 26 | 6:00 p.m. | at Tulsa | | H. A. Chapman Stadium; Tulsa, OK | CBSSN | W 42–41 | 17,183 |
| November 2 | 6:30 p.m. | No. 15 SMU^{†} | No. 24 | Liberty Bowl Memorial Stadium; Memphis, TN (College GameDay) | ABC | W 54–48 | 59,506 |
| November 16 | 2:30 p.m. | at Houston | No. 18 | TDECU Stadium; Houston, TX | ESPN2 | W 45–27 | 25,149 |
| November 23 | 3:00 p.m. | at South Florida | No. 18 | Raymond James Stadium; Tampa, FL | ESPNU | W 49–10 | 25,136 |
| November 29 | 2:30 p.m. | No. 19 Cincinnati | No. 18 | Liberty Bowl Memorial Stadium; Memphis, TN | ABC | W 34–24 | 36,472 |
| December 7 | 2:30 p.m. | No. 20 Cincinnati | No. 17 | Liberty Bowl Memorial Stadium; Memphis, TN (The American Championship) | ABC | W 29–24 | 33,008 |
| December 28 | 11:00 a.m. | vs. No. 10 Penn State* | No. 17 | AT&T Stadium; Arlington, TX (Cotton Bowl Classic) | ESPN | L 39–53 | 54,828 |
*Non-conference game; ^{†}Homecoming; Rankings from AP Poll and CFP Rankings after November 5 released prior to game; All times are in Central time

Schedule source:

== Game summaries ==
=== Ole Miss ===
| | 1 | 2 | 3 | 4 | Total |
|---|---|---|---|---|---|
| Rebels | 0 | 0 | 3 | 7 | 10 |
| Tigers | 7 | 6 | 0 | 2 | 15 |

=== Southern ===
| | 1 | 2 | 3 | 4 | Total |
|---|---|---|---|---|---|
| Jaguars | 7 | 10 | 7 | 0 | 24 |
| Tigers | 17 | 10 | 21 | 7 | 55 |

=== At South Alabama ===
| | 1 | 2 | 3 | 4 | Total |
|---|---|---|---|---|---|
| Tigers | 7 | 16 | 7 | 12 | 42 |
| Jaguars | 0 | 0 | 0 | 6 | 6 |

=== Navy ===
| | 1 | 2 | 3 | 4 | Total |
|---|---|---|---|---|---|
| Midshipmen | 13 | 7 | 0 | 3 | 23 |
| Tigers | 7 | 7 | 14 | 7 | 35 |

=== At Louisiana–Monroe ===
Week Five: Memphis Tigers at Louisiana–Monroe Warhawks – Game summary

| Quarter | 1 | 2 | 3 | 4 | Total |
|---|---|---|---|---|---|
| Tigers | 7 | 22 | 10 | 13 | 52 |
| Warhawks | 3 | 14 | 9 | 7 | 33 |

at Malone Stadium • Monroe, LA

- Date: October 5
- Game time: 2:45 p.m. CDT
- Game weather: 91° · Wind – SW 3 · Partly Clear
- Game attendance: 17,1143
- Referee: Anthony Calabrese
- TV: ESPNU

Game information

First quarter

- (12:18) MEM TD – Damonte Coxie 5-yard pass from Brady White, Riley Patterson kick
  Memphis 7–0; Drive: 6 plays, 75 yards, 1:55
- (05:25) ULM FG – Porter 35-yard field goal
  Memphis 7–3; Drive: 16 plays, 74 yards, 6:52

Second quarter

- (13:46) MEM TD – Kenneth Gainwell 40-yard rush, Riley Patterson kick
  Memphis 14–3; Drive: 6 plays, 92 yards, 1:48
- (11:12) ULM TD – Caleb Evans 7-yard rush, Jared Porter kick
  Memphis 14–10; Drive: 6 plays, 75 yards, 2:34
- (07:30) MEM TD – Kameron Wilson 2-yard pass from Brady White, Jared Porter kick
  Memphis 21–10; Drive: 8 plays, 75 yards, 3:42
- (05:01) MEM TD – Kylan Watkins 14-yard rush, Preston Brady two-point conversion rush
  Memphis 29–10; Drive: 6 plays, 54 yards, 2:29
- (01:40) ULM TD – Josh Pederson 6-yard pass from Caleb Evans, Jared Porter kick
  Memphis 29–17; Drive: 9 plays, 82 yards, 3:21

Third quarter

- (11:57) MEM FG – Riley Patterson 50-yard field goal
  Memphis 31–17; Drive: 8 plays, 43 yards, 3:03
- (07:41) ULM FG – Jared Porter 29-yard field goal
  Memphis 31–20; Drive: 10 plays, 63 yards, 4:16
- (06:11) MEM TD – Antonio Gibson 50-yard pass from Brady White, Riley Patterson kick
  Memphis 39–20; Drive: 4 plays, 73 yards, 1:30
- (03:11) ULM TD – Caleb Evans 45-yard rush, two-point conversion rush attempt failed
  Memphis 39–26; Drive: 6 plays, 82 yards, 3:00

Fourth quarter

- (06:31) ULM TD – Josh Pederson 36-yard pass from Caleb Evans, Jared Porter kick
  Memphis 39–33; Drive: 6 plays, 93 yards, 1:56
- (06:16) MEM TD – Kenneth Gainwell 68-yard rush, two-point conversion pass attempt failed
  Memphis 45–33; Drive: 1 plays, 68 yards, 0:15
- (06:07) MEM TD – La'Andre Thomas 33-yard interception returned, Riley Patterson kick
  Memphis 52–33; Drive: 1 play, 0 yards, 0:09

Leading Passers

- MEM – Brady White – 15/23, 249 yards, 3 TD, INT
- ULM – Caleb Evans – 23/44, 286 yards, 2 TD, INT

Leading Rushers

- MEM – Kenneth Gainwell – 14 carries, 209 yards, 2 TD
- ULM – Josh Johnson – 19 carries, 119 yards

Leading Receivers

- MEM – Antonio Gibson – 1 reception, 50 yards, TD
- ULM – Josh Pederson – 7 receptions, 82 yards, 2 TD

| Statistics | Memphis | Louisiana–Monroe |
|---|---|---|
| First downs | 25 | 30 |
| Total yards | 535 | 575 |
| Rushing yards | 286 | 256 |
| Passing yards | 249 | 319 |
| Turnovers | 2 | 1 |
| Time of possession | 26:06 | 33:54 |

=== At Temple ===
| | 1 | 2 | 3 | 4 | Total |
|---|---|---|---|---|---|
| No. 23 Tigers | 0 | 14 | 7 | 7 | 28 |
| Owls | 13 | 10 | 0 | 7 | 30 |

=== Tulane ===
| | 1 | 2 | 3 | 4 | Total |
|---|---|---|---|---|---|
| Green Wave | 3 | 7 | 0 | 7 | 17 |
| Tigers | 13 | 21 | 6 | 7 | 47 |

=== At Tulsa ===
| | 1 | 2 | 3 | 4 | Total |
|---|---|---|---|---|---|
| Tigers | 14 | 14 | 7 | 7 | 42 |
| Golden Hurricane | 0 | 17 | 14 | 10 | 41 |

=== SMU ===
SMU at Memphis
(College GameDay)

| Team | 1 | 2 | 3 | 4 | Total |
|---|---|---|---|---|---|
| No. 15 Mustangs | 7 | 10 | 7 | 24 | 48 |
| • No. 24 Tigers | 7 | 16 | 17 | 14 | 54 |

- Date: November 2, 2019
- Location: Liberty Bowl Memorial Stadium
  Memphis, TN
- Game start: 7:30 p.m. EDT
- Game weather: Temperature:
- TV announcers (ABC): Chris Fowler (play-by-play), Kirk Herbstreit (analyst) and Maria Taylor (sideline)

=== At Houston ===
| | 1 | 2 | 3 | 4 | Total |
|---|---|---|---|---|---|
| No. 18 Tigers | 7 | 21 | 14 | 3 | 45 |
| Cougars | 17 | 3 | 0 | 7 | 27 |

=== At South Florida ===
| | 1 | 2 | 3 | 4 | Total |
|---|---|---|---|---|---|
| No. 18 Tigers | 7 | 21 | 14 | 7 | 49 |
| Bulls | 10 | 0 | 0 | 0 | 10 |

=== Cincinnati ===
Cincinnati at Memphis – Game summary

| Quarter | 1 | 2 | 3 | 4 | Total |
|---|---|---|---|---|---|
| No. 19 Bearcats | 3 | 14 | 0 | 7 | 24 |
| No. 18 Tigers | 17 | 3 | 0 | 14 | 34 |

at Liberty Bowl Memorial Stadium, Memphis, TN

- Date: November 29
- Game time: 3:30 EST (2:30 CST)
- Game weather: Cloudy, 55 °F (13 °C)
- Game attendance: 36,472
- Referee: Mike Roche
- TV: ABC

Game information

First quarter

- MEM 14:48 Chris Claybrooks 94 kickoff return (Riley Patterson Kick)
- CIN 10:25 Sam Crosa 30 FG (11 Plays 63 Yards 4:23)
- MEM 7:24 Kendarian Jones 9 Pass from Brady White (Riley Patterson Kick) 7, 77 3:01
- MEM 2:41 Riley Patterson 34 FG (8 plays, 57 yards 2:24)

Second quarter

- CIN 12:36 Leonard Taylor 4 Pass from Ben Bryant (Sam Crosa Kick) 12, 85 5:05
- CIN 2:54 Michael Warren II 3 run (Sam Crosa Kick) 14, 80, 6:31
- MEM 1:21 Riley Patterson 28 FG (7 plays 65 yards, 1:43)

Third quarter

No Scoring

Fourth quarter

- MEM 13:22 Damonte Coxie 46 pass from Brady White (Riley Patterson Kick) 9, 83, 3:40
- CIN 10:27 Ben Bryant 12 run (Sam Crosa Kick) 8, 75 2:55
- MEM 3:16 Antonio Gibson 29 run (Riley Patterson Kick) 6, 62, 3:08

Top passers

- CIN – Ben Bryant 20–32 229 1 TD, 2 INTs
- MEM – Brady White 15–26 233 2 TDs 1 INT

Top rushers

- CIN – Michael Warren II 21 Carries 122 Yards 1 TD
- MEM – Kenneth Gainwell 15 Carries 87 Yards

Top receivers

- CIN – Alec Pierce 4 Receptions 77 Yards
- MEM – Damonte Coxie 6 Receptions 145 Yards 1 TD

=== Cincinnati (AAC Championship game) ===
Cincinnati at Memphis AAC Championship – Game summary

| Quarter | 1 | 2 | 3 | 4 | Total |
|---|---|---|---|---|---|
| No. 20 Bearcats | 7 | 7 | 7 | 3 | 24 |
| No. 17 Tigers | 10 | 0 | 10 | 9 | 29 |

at Liberty Bowl Memorial Stadium, Memphis, TN

- Date: December 7
- Game time: 3:30PM (2:30P CST)
- Game weather: 45 °F (7 °C), Clear
- Game attendance: 33,009
- Referee: Charles Lamertina
- TV: ABC

Game information

First Quarter

- (12:27) CIN – Michael Warren 6 yard rush, Sam Crosa kick (Drive: 6 plays, 30 yards, 2:33; Cincinnati 7–0)
- (8:21) MEM – Riley Patterson 29 yard field goal (Drive: 12 plays, 64 yards, 3:59; Cincinnati 7–3)
- (2:36) MEM – Antonio Gibson 65 yard rush, Riley Patterson kick (Drive: 7 plays, 97 yards, 2:29; Memphis 10–7)

Second Quarter

- (2:37) CIN – Desmond Ridder 15 yard rush, Sam Crosa kick (Drive: 7 plays, 80 yards, 2:09; Cincinnati 14–10)

Third Quarter

- (11:59) MEM – Brady White 1 yard rush, Riley Patterson kick (Drive: 7 plays, 75 yards, 2:56; Memphis 17–14)
- (7:21) CIN – Michael Warren 3 yard rush, Sam Crosa kick (Drive: 9 plays, 75 yards, 4:38; Cincinnati 21–17)

(3:54) MEM – Riley Patterson 52 yard field goal (Drive: 10 plays, 41 yards, 3:27; Cincinnati 21–20)

Fourth Quarter

- (14:47) MEM – Riley Patterson 50 yard field goal (Drive: 11 plays, 31 yards, 3:54; Memphis 23–21)
- (4:23) CIN – Sam Crosa 33 yard field goal (Drive: 13 plays, 54 yards, 6:27; Cincinnati 24–23)
- (1:14) MEM – Brady White 6 yard pass to Antonio Gibson, 2-point pass failed (Drive: 10 plays, 75 yards, 3:09; Memphis 29–24)

Top passers

- CIN – Desmond Ridder 16–36 233 Yds 1 INTs
- MEM – Brady White 18–40 253 Yds 1 TDs 1 INT

Top rushers

- CIN – Desmond Ridder 11 Carries 113 Yards 1 TD
- MEM – Antonio Gibson 11 Carries 130 Yards 1 TD

Top receivers

- CIN – Alec Pierce 5 Receptions 87 Yards
- MEM – Damonte Coxie 9 Receptions 165 Yards

=== Vs. Penn State (Cotton Bowl Classic) ===
| | 1 | 2 | 3 | 4 | Total |
|---|---|---|---|---|---|
| No. 17 Tigers | 13 | 10 | 13 | 3 | 39 |
| No. 10 Nittany Lions | 7 | 28 | 10 | 8 | 53 |

== Rankings ==
Ranking movements Legend: ██ Increase in ranking ██ Decrease in ranking RV = Received votes т = Tied with team above or below
| | Week | | | | | | | | | | | | | | | | |
| Poll | Pre | 1 | 2 | 3 | 4 | 5 | 6 | 7 | 8 | 9 | 10 | 11 | 12 | 13 | 14 | 15 | Final |
|---|---|---|---|---|---|---|---|---|---|---|---|---|---|---|---|---|---|
| AP | RV | RV | RV | RV | RV | RV | 23 | RV | RV | 24 | 19 | 18 | 18 | 17 | 16 | 15 | 17 |
| Coaches | RV | RV | RV | RV | RV | 23т | 20 | RV | 25 | 23 | 19 | 18 | 18 | 18 | 16 | 15 | 17 |
| CFP | Not released | | | | | | | | | | 21 | 18 | 18 | 18 | 17 | 17 | Not released |

== Players drafted into the NFL ==
| Round | Pick | Player | Position | NFL Club |
|---|---|---|---|---|
| 3 | 66 | Antonio Gibson | RB | Washington Redskins |
| 7 | 223 | Chris Claybrooks | CB | Jacksonville Jaguars |
| 7 | 230 | Dustin Woodard | C | New England Patriots |
