= James Earl Wright =

James Earl Wright may refer to:

- James Earl Wright, ringname of Dale Veasey (born 1960), American professional wrestler
- James Earl Wright (American football) (born 1939), gridiron football defensive back and quarterback
