= 2020 NFL draft =

2020 American football draft

General information
- Date: April 23–25, 2020
- Location: ESPN studio complex, Bristol, Connecticut (draft emanated from Bronxville, New York via video conference call)
- Networks: ABC, ESPN, NFL Network, ESPN Deportes, ESPN Radio

Overview
- 255 total selections in 7 rounds
- League: National Football League
- First selection: Joe Burrow, QB, Cincinnati Bengals
- Mr. Irrelevant: Tae Crowder, LB, New York Giants
- Most selections (15): Minnesota Vikings
- Fewest selections (4): New Orleans Saints

The 2020 NFL draft was the 85th annual meeting of National Football League (NFL) franchises to select newly eligible players for the 2020 NFL season. The first round was held on April 23, followed by the second and third rounds on April 24. The draft concluded with rounds 4–7 on April 25. The NFL originally planned to hold the event live in Paradise, Nevada, before all public events related to it were canceled due to the COVID-19 pandemic. Instead, all team selections took place via videoconferencing with league commissioner Roger Goodell announcing picks from his home.

The draft is noteworthy for producing five playoff starters at the quarterback position: Joe Burrow, Tua Tagovailoa, Justin Herbert, Jordan Love and Jalen Hurts. Burrow became the first to reach a Super Bowl in Super Bowl LVI, while Hurts became the first Super Bowl–winner of the group in Super Bowl LIX. The Washington Redskins retired their name two months after the 2020 draft, making it the final draft where players were selected under the Redskins branding.

== Format ==
The host city was chosen among finalists Denver, Kansas City, Las Vegas, Nashville and Cleveland/Canton in May 2018 during the NFL Spring League Meeting, when Nashville was chosen to host the 2019 draft. However, the host city for 2020 was deferred. After Denver withdrew, citing scheduling conflicts, Las Vegas was chosen as the original host on December 12, 2018, coinciding with the Las Vegas Raiders' arrival in the city. Plans were announced for a main stage near the Caesars Forum convention center and a "red carpet" stage for arrivals on a floating platform in front of the Bellagio resort, with players being transported to and from the stage by boat. However, due to the COVID-19 pandemic, the NFL announced on March 16 that it had canceled all public festivities associated with the event.

Instead, the draft was held remotely, with team coaches and GMs convening via Microsoft Teams due to all team facilities also being closed. NFL commissioner Roger Goodell announced the picks for rounds 1–3 from his home in Bronxville, New York, with the rest of the rounds being announced by Dave Gardi. During the event Goodell announced that Las Vegas would host the 2022 NFL draft.

== Player selections ==
The following is the breakdown of the 255 players selected by position:

- 38 linebackers
- 35 wide receivers
- 27 cornerbacks
- 20 defensive tackles
- 20 offensive tackles
- 20 safeties
- 18 guards
- 18 running backs
- 18 defensive ends
- 13 quarterbacks
- 12 tight ends
- 9 centers
- 3 kickers
- 2 punters
- 1 long snapper
- 1 safety/linebacker

*	compensatory selection
†	Pro Bowler (Note: Players are identified as Pro Bowlers if they were selected for the Pro Bowl at any time in their career.)

Positions key
Offense	Defense	Special teams
QB — Quarterback; RB — Running back; FB — Fullback; WR — Wide receiver; TE — Tight end; OL — Offensive lineman; T — Tackle; G — Guard; C — Center	DL — Defensive lineman; DT — Defensive tackle (Note: Includes nose tackle (NT)); DE — Defensive end; EDGE — Edge rusher; LB — Linebacker (Note: Includes middle linebacker (MLB/MIKE), weakside linebacker (WILL), strongside linebacker (SAM), off-ball linebacker, and outside linebacker (OLB)); DB — Defensive back; CB — Cornerback; S — Safety (Note: Includes free safety (FS) and strong safety (SS))	K — Kicker (Note: Also known as a placekicker (PK)); P — Punter; LS — Long snapper; RS — Return specialist (Note: Includes kickoff and punt returners)

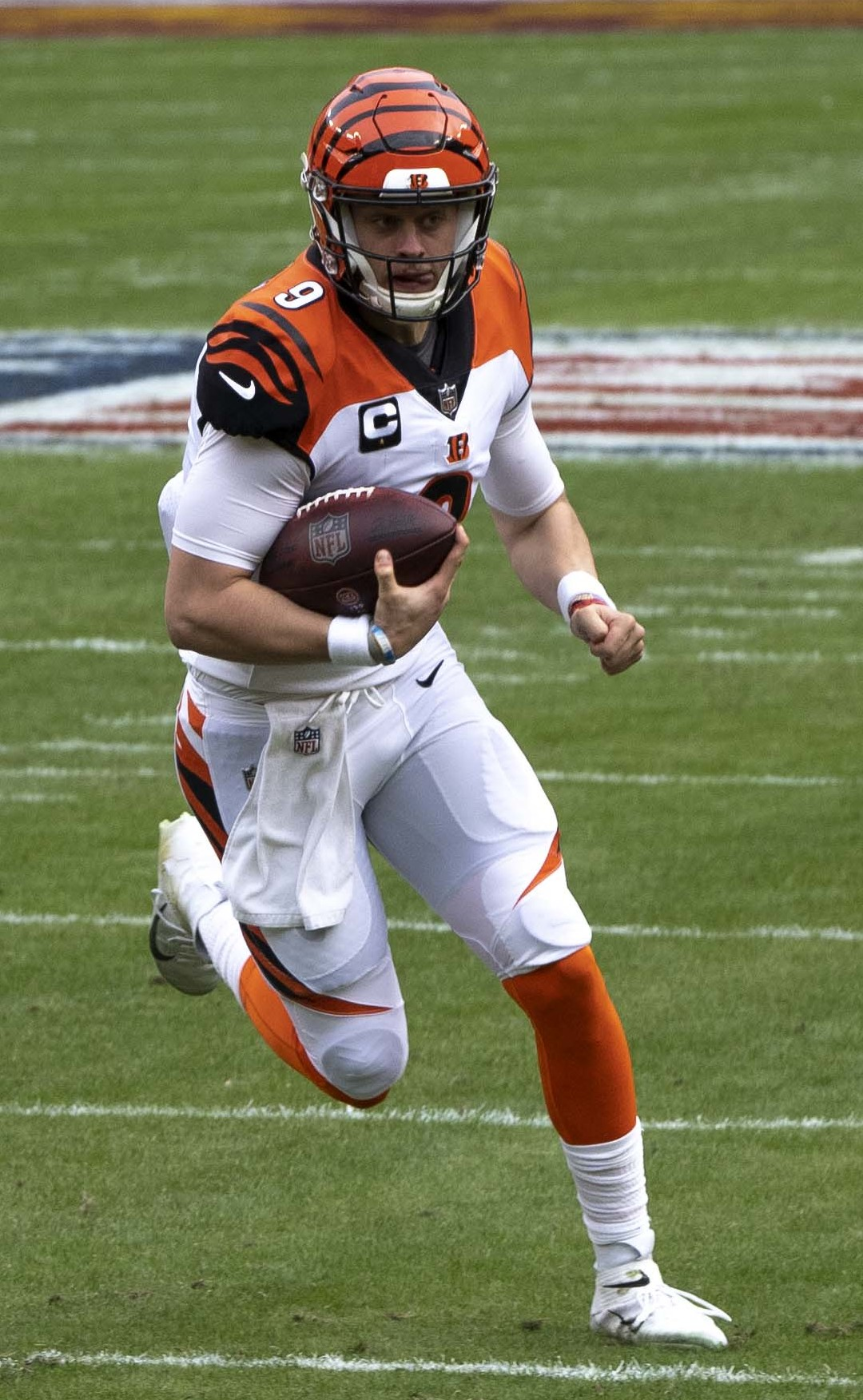
Quarterback Joe Burrow was selected 1st overall by the Cincinnati Bengals and two years later helped lead the Bengals to Super Bowl LVI, their first since 1988.

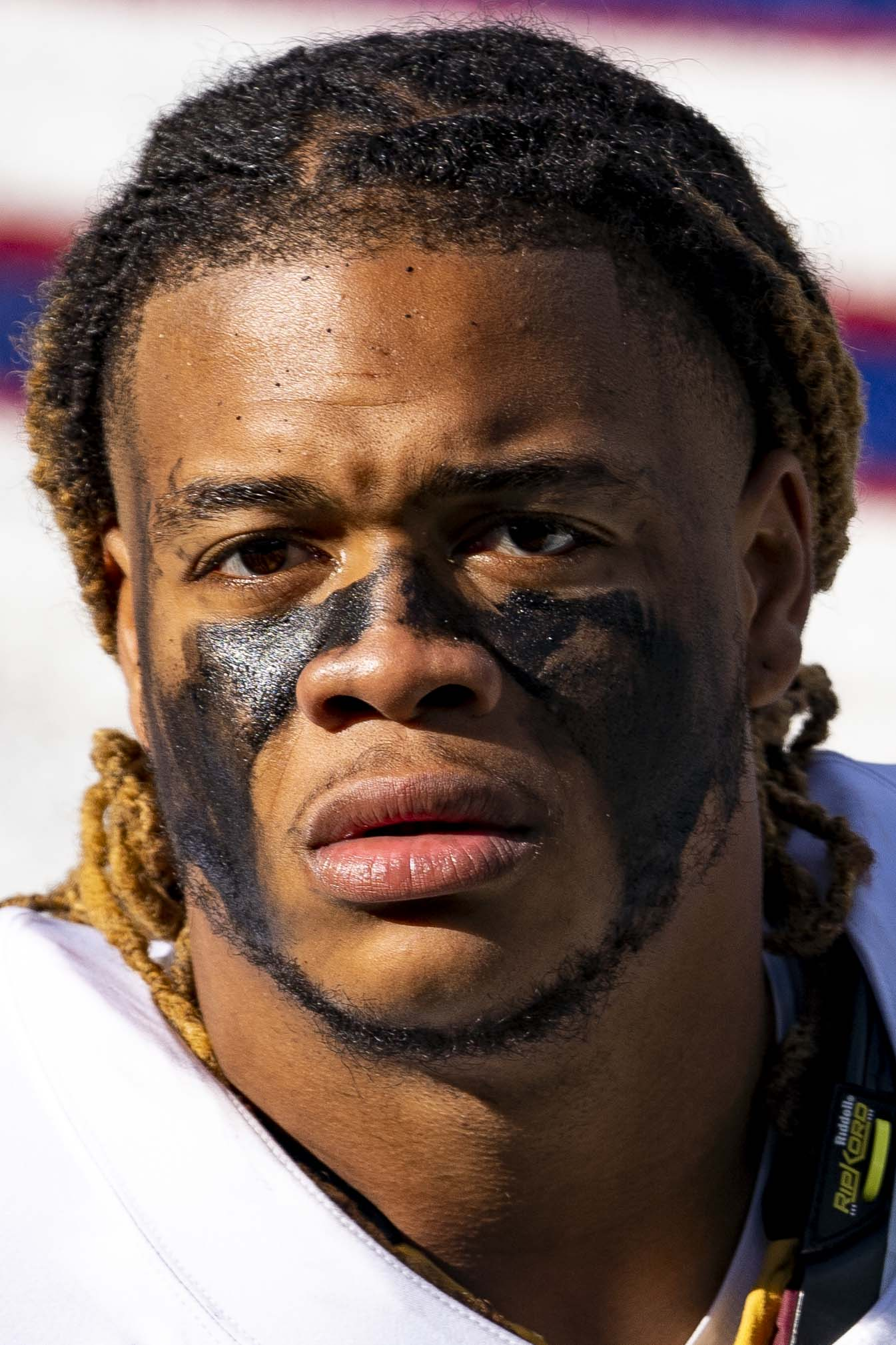
Defensive end Chase Young was selected 2nd overall by the Washington Redskins and was later named NFL Defensive Rookie of the Year.

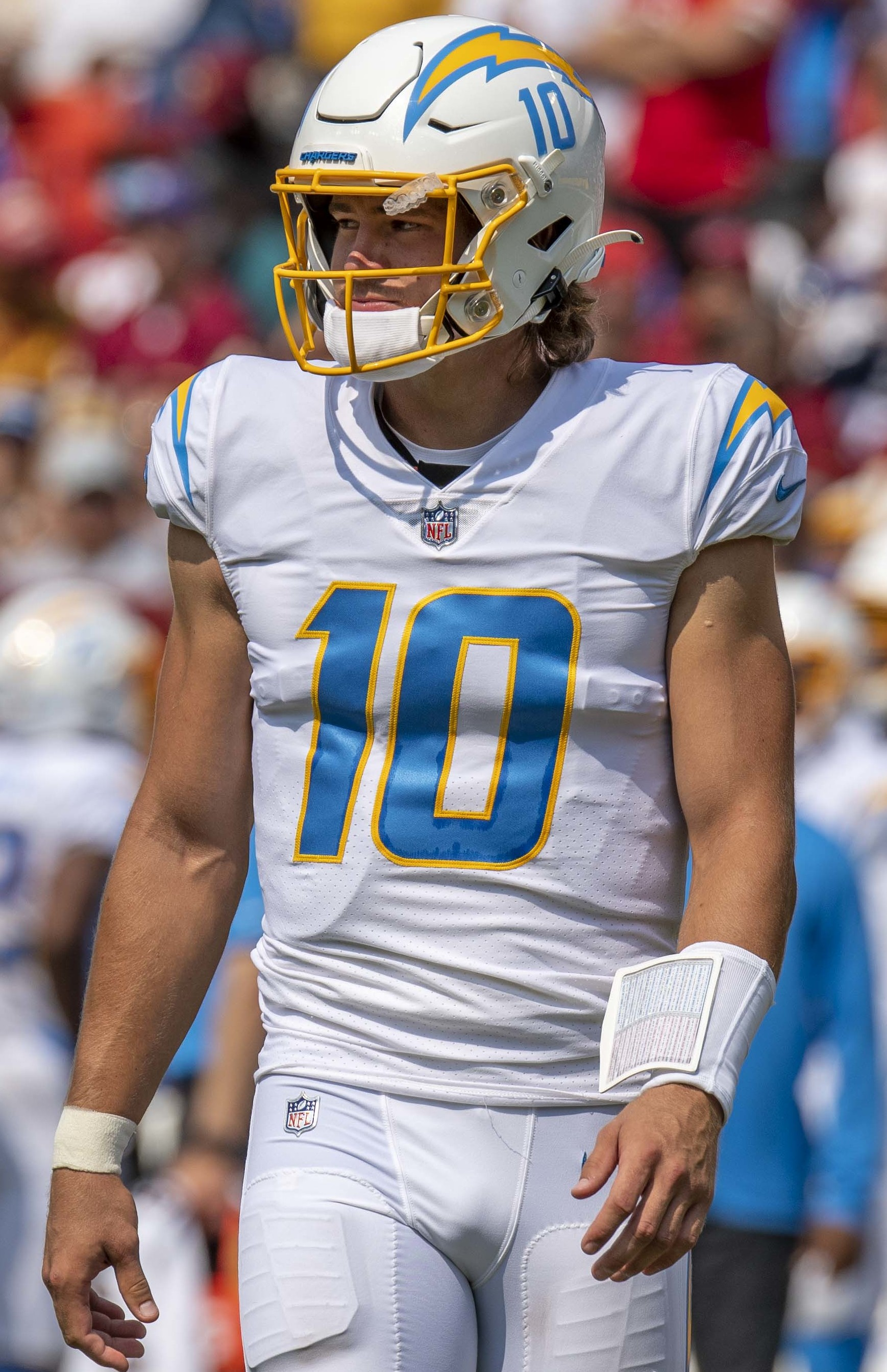
Quarterback Justin Herbert was selected 6th overall by the Los Angeles Chargers, broke several rookie records and was later named NFL Offensive Rookie of the Year.

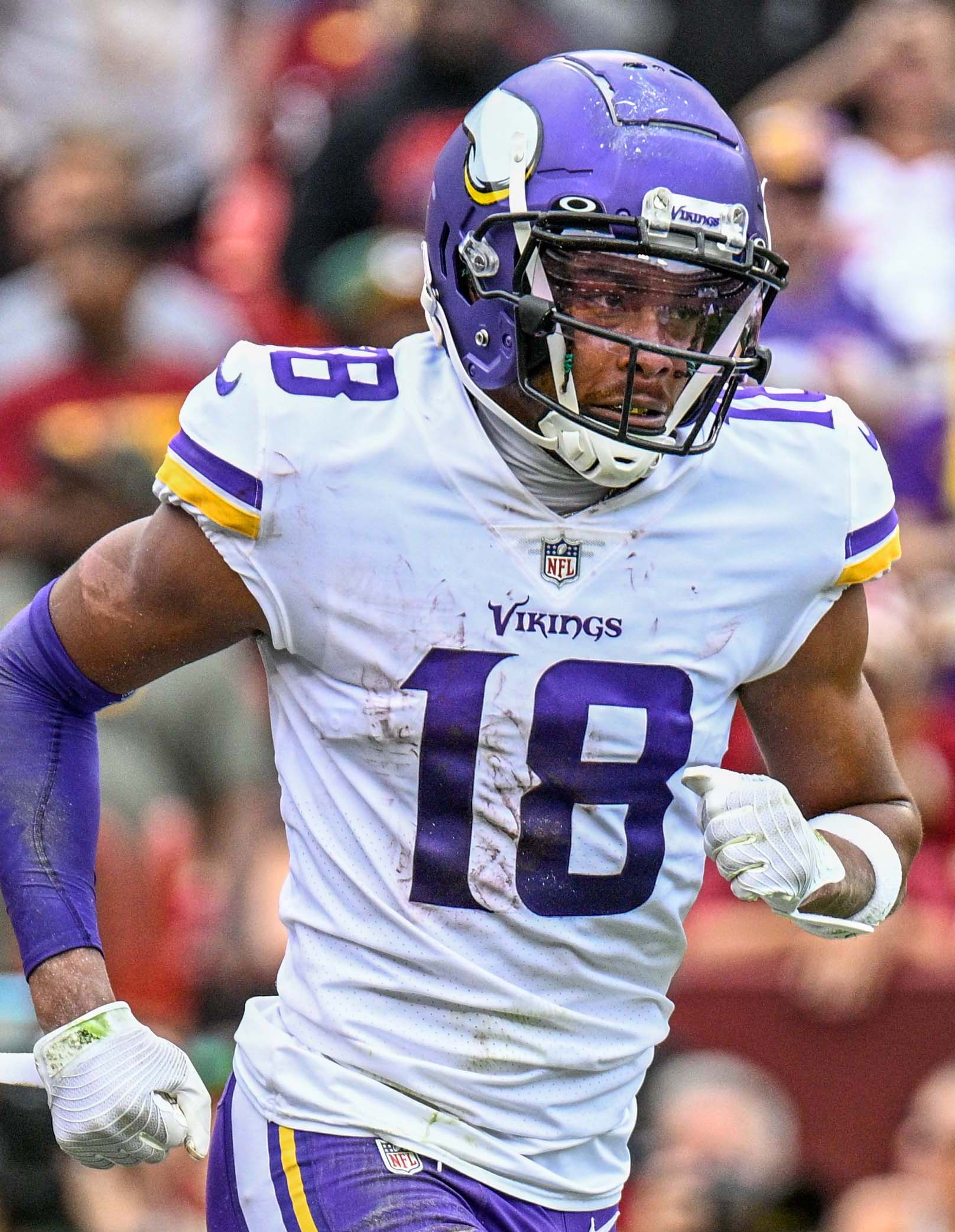
Wide receiver Justin Jefferson was selected 22nd overall by the Minnesota Vikings. He set the rookie record for most receiving yards in a season with 1,400. He is also 6th all time in receiving yards in a single season.

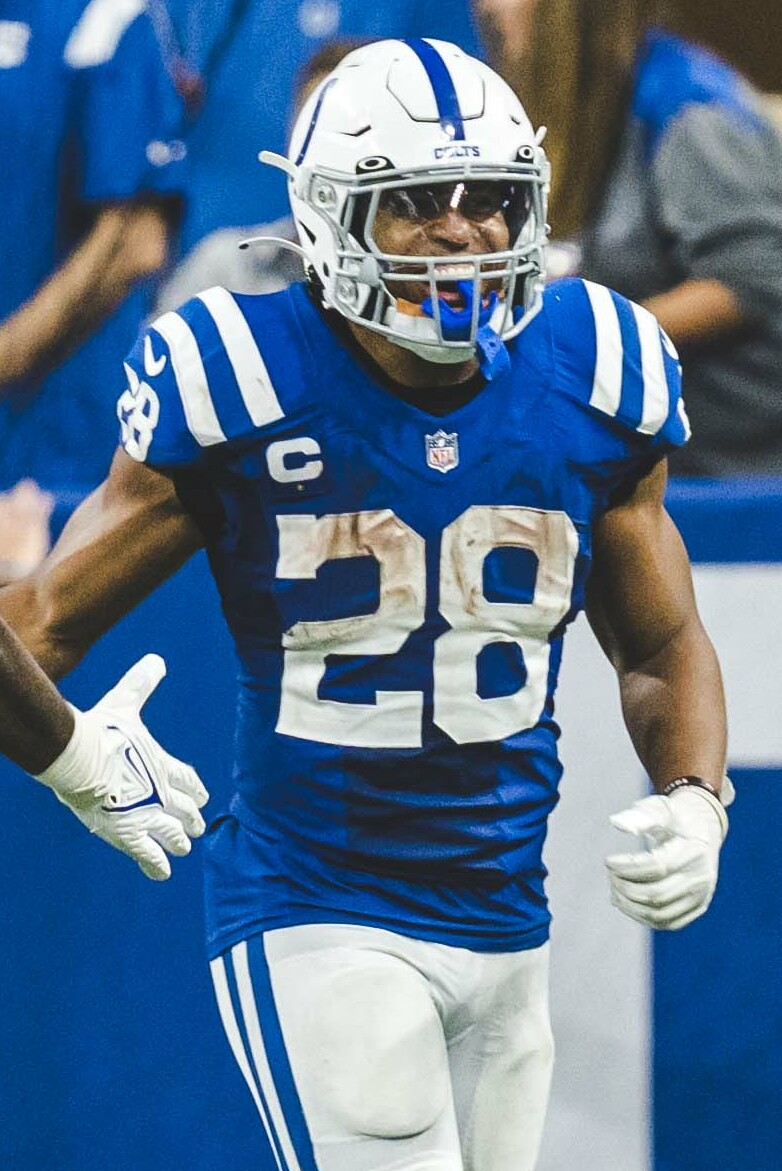
Selected 41st overall by the Indianapolis Colts, Jonathan Taylor has broken several franchise rushing and scrimmage yards records and made the Pro Bowl in his second season in the NFL.

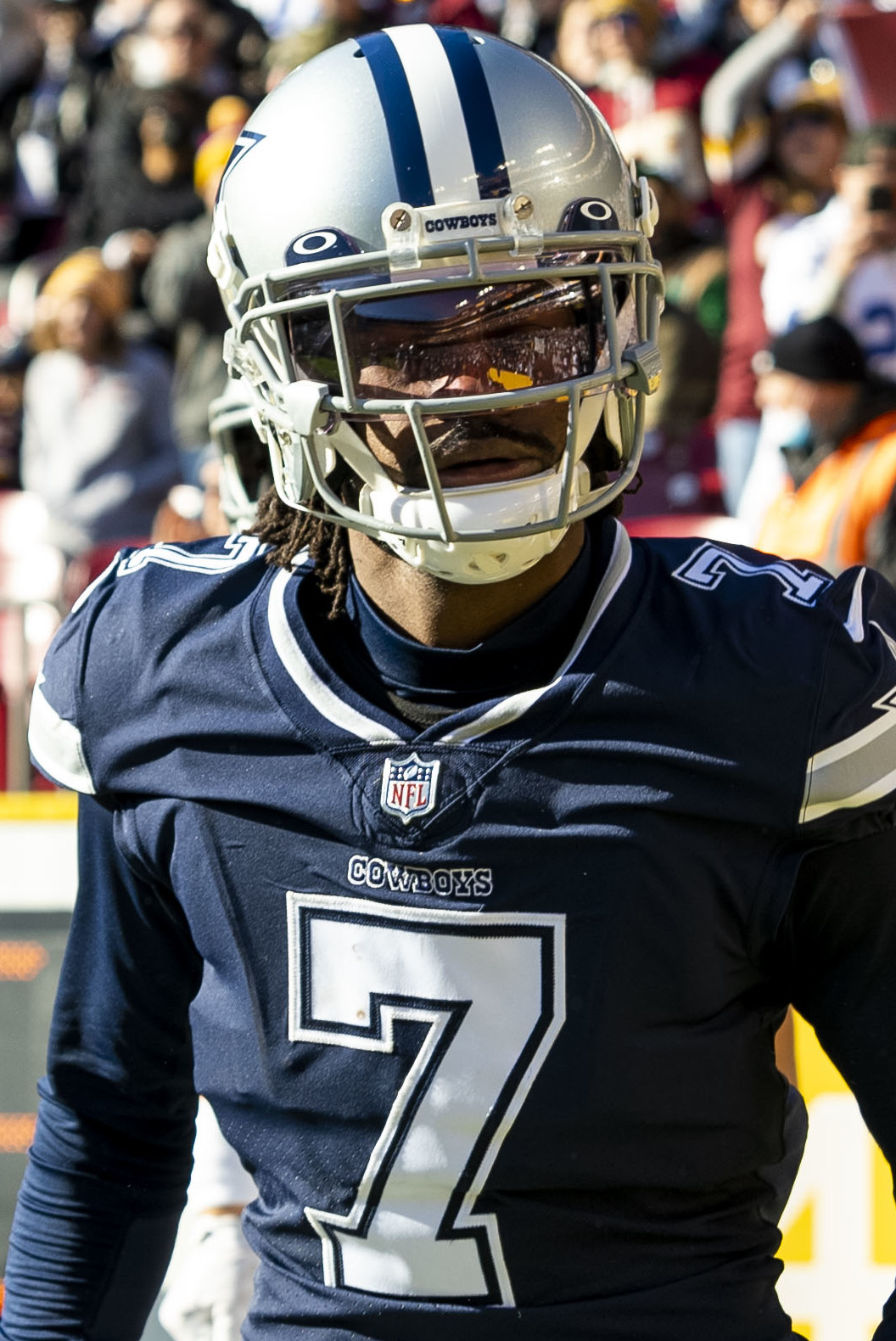
Trevon Diggs, selected 51st overall by the Dallas Cowboys, led the league in interceptions in 2021

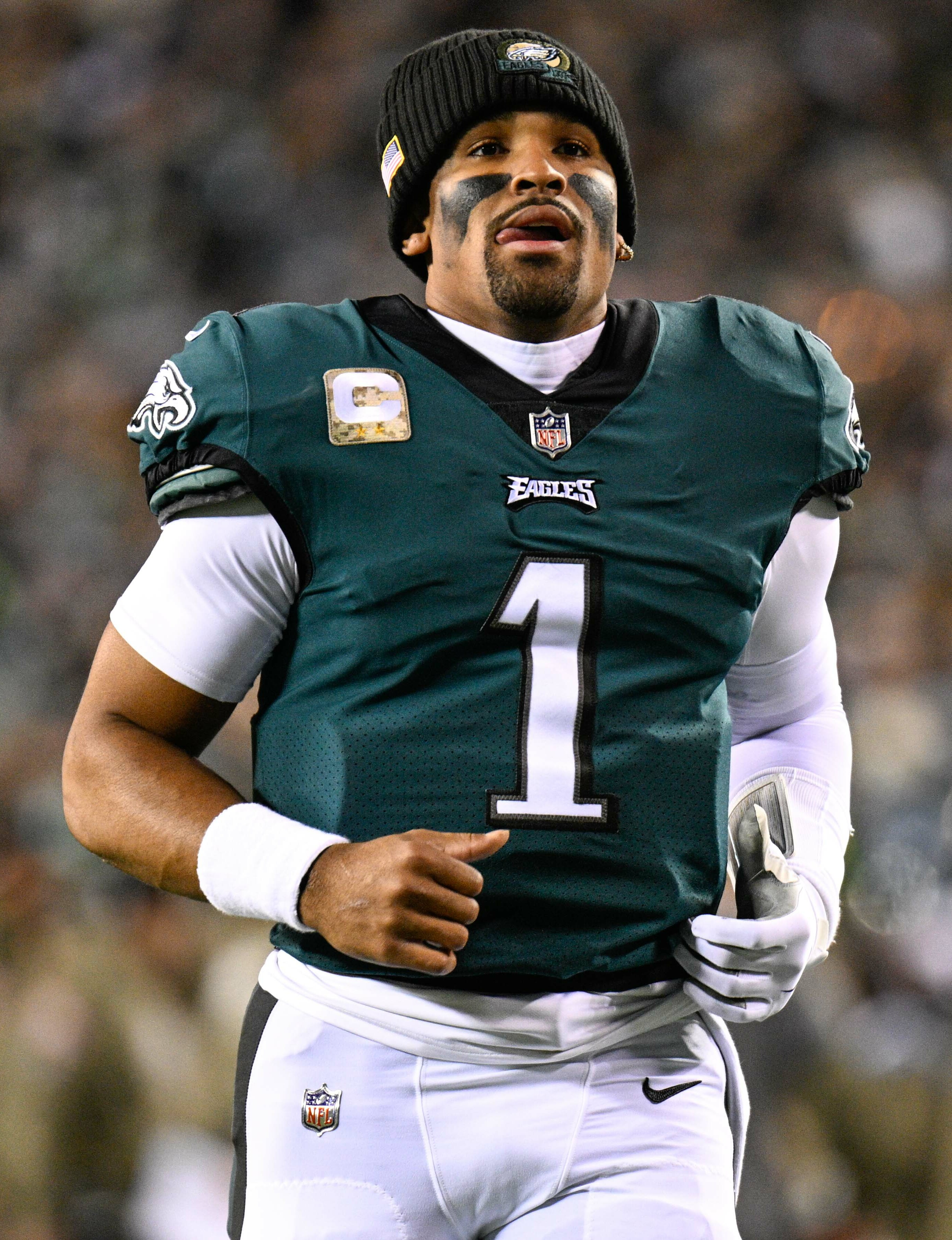
Jalen Hurts, selected 53rd overall by the Philadelphia Eagles, was a Pro Bowl and All-Pro selection in his third season, led the Eagles to multiple Super Bowl appearances and was the MVP of Super Bowl LIX.

Rnd.	Pick	Team	Player	Pos.	College	Notes
1	1	Cincinnati Bengals	Joe Burrow ^{†}	QB	LSU	2019 Heisman Trophy winner
1	2	Washington Redskins	Chase Young ^{†}	DE	Ohio State	2019 Bronko Nagurski Trophy and Chuck Bednarik Award winner AP NFL Defensive Rookie of the Year
1	3	Detroit Lions	Jeff Okudah	CB	Ohio State	
1	4	New York Giants	Andrew Thomas	T	Georgia	
1	5	Miami Dolphins	Tua Tagovailoa ^{†}	QB	Alabama	2018 Maxwell Award and Walter Camp Award winner
1	6	Los Angeles Chargers	Justin Herbert ^{†}	QB	Oregon	2019 William V. Campbell Trophy winner AP NFL Offensive Rookie of the Year
1	7	Carolina Panthers	Derrick Brown ^{†}	DT	Auburn	
1	8	Arizona Cardinals	Isaiah Simmons	LB	Clemson	2019 Dick Butkus Award winner
1	9	Jacksonville Jaguars	C. J. Henderson	CB	Florida	
1	10	Cleveland Browns	Jedrick Wills	T	Alabama	
1	11	New York Jets	Mekhi Becton	T	Louisville	
1	12	Las Vegas Raiders	Henry Ruggs	WR	Alabama	
1	13	Tampa Bay Buccaneers	Tristan Wirfs ^{†}	T	Iowa	from Indianapolis via San Francisco (Note: No. 13: Multiple trades: Indianapolis → San Francisco (PD). Indianapolis traded a first-round selection (13th overall) to San Francisco in exchange for DT DeForest Buckner. San Francisco → Tampa Bay (D). San Francisco traded first- and seventh-round selections (13th and 245th overall) to Tampa Bay in exchange for first- and fourth-round selections (14th and 117th overall).)
1	14	San Francisco 49ers	Javon Kinlaw	DT	South Carolina	from Tampa Bay (Note: No. 14: Tampa Bay → San Francisco (D). See Round 1: San Francisco → Tampa Bay.)
1	15	Denver Broncos	Jerry Jeudy ^{†}	WR	Alabama	
1	16	Atlanta Falcons	A. J. Terrell	CB	Clemson	
1	17	Dallas Cowboys	CeeDee Lamb ^{†}	WR	Oklahoma	
1	18	Miami Dolphins	Austin Jackson	T	USC	from Pittsburgh (Note: No. 18: Pittsburgh → Miami (PD). Pittsburgh traded first- and fifth-round selections (18th and 154th overall) and a 2021 sixth-round selection to Miami in exchange for a fourth-round selection (135th overall) and S Minkah Fitzpatrick.)
1	19	Las Vegas Raiders	Damon Arnette	CB	Ohio State	from Chicago (Note: No. 19: Chicago → Las Vegas (PD). Chicago traded first- and third-round selections (19th and 81st overall), and 2019 first- and sixth-round selections to Las Vegas in exchange for a second-round selection and a conditional seventh-round selection (43rd and 226th overall), and LB Khalil Mack; the seventh-round selection could have become a fifth-round selection if conditions had been met.)
1	20	Jacksonville Jaguars	K'Lavon Chaisson	DE	LSU	from LA Rams (Note: No. 20: LA Rams → Jacksonville (PD). The LA Rams traded a first-round selection (20th overall), and 2021 first- and fourth-round selections to Jacksonville in exchange for CB Jalen Ramsey.)
1	21	Philadelphia Eagles	Jalen Reagor	WR	TCU	
1	22	Minnesota Vikings	Justin Jefferson ^{†}	WR	LSU	from Buffalo (Note: No. 22: Buffalo → Minnesota (PD). Buffalo traded first-, fifth- and sixth-round selections (22nd, 155th and 201st overall), and a 2021 fourth-round selection to Minnesota in exchange for a seventh-round selection (239th overall) and WR Stefon Diggs.)
1	23	Los Angeles Chargers	Kenneth Murray	LB	Oklahoma	from New England (Note: No. 23: New England → LA Chargers (D). New England traded a first-round selection (23rd overall) to the LA Chargers in exchange for second- and third-round selections (37th and 71st overall).)
1	24	New Orleans Saints	Cesar Ruiz	C	Michigan	
1	25	San Francisco 49ers	Brandon Aiyuk	WR	Arizona State	from Minnesota (Note: No. 25: Minnesota → San Francisco (D). Minnesota traded a first-round selection (25th overall) to San Francisco in exchange for first-, fourth- and fifth-round selections (31st, 117th and 176th overall).)
1	26	Green Bay Packers	Jordan Love	QB	Utah State	from Houston via Miami (Note: No. 26: Multiple trades: Houston → Miami (PD). Houston traded a first-round selection (26th overall), 2021 first- and second-round selections, OT Julién Davenport and CB Johnson Bademosi to Miami in exchange for a fourth-round selection (111th overall), a 2021 sixth-round selection, WR Kenny Stills and OT Laremy Tunsil. Miami → Green Bay (D). Miami traded a first-round selection (26th overall) to Green Bay in exchange for first- and fourth-round selections (30th and 136th overall).)
1	27	Seattle Seahawks	Jordyn Brooks	LB	Texas Tech	
1	28	Baltimore Ravens	Patrick Queen ^{†}	LB	LSU	
1	29	Tennessee Titans	Isaiah Wilson	T	Georgia	
1	30	Miami Dolphins	Noah Igbinoghene	CB	Auburn	from Green Bay (Note: No. 30: Green Bay → Miami (D). See Round 1: Miami → Green Bay.)
1	31	Minnesota Vikings	Jeff Gladney	CB	TCU	from San Francisco (Note: No. 31: San Francisco → Minnesota (D). See Round 1: Minnesota → San Francisco.)
1	32	Kansas City Chiefs	Clyde Edwards-Helaire	RB	LSU	
2	33	Cincinnati Bengals	Tee Higgins ^{†}	WR	Clemson	
2	34	Indianapolis Colts	Michael Pittman Jr.	WR	USC	from Washington (Note: No. 34: Washington → Indianapolis (PD). Washington traded a second-round selection (34th overall) and a 2019 second-round selection to Indianapolis in exchange for a 2019 first-round selection.)
2	35	Detroit Lions	D'Andre Swift ^{†}	RB	Georgia	
2	36	New York Giants	Xavier McKinney ^{†}	S	Alabama	
2	37	New England Patriots	Kyle Dugger	S	Lenoir–Rhyne	from LA Chargers (Note: No. 37: LA Chargers → New England (D). See Round 1: New England → LA Chargers.)
2	38	Carolina Panthers	Yetur Gross-Matos	DE	Penn State	
2	39	Miami Dolphins	Robert Hunt ^{†}	G	Louisiana	
2	40	Houston Texans	Ross Blacklock	DT	TCU	from Arizona (Note: No. 40: Arizona → Houston (PD). Arizona traded a second-round selection (40th overall), a 2021 fourth-round selection and RB David Johnson to Houston in exchange for a fourth-round selection and WR DeAndre Hopkins.)
2	41	Indianapolis Colts	Jonathan Taylor ^{†}	RB	Wisconsin	from Cleveland (Note: No. 41: Cleveland → Indianapolis (D). Cleveland traded a second-round selection (41st overall) to Indianapolis in exchange for second- and fifth-round selections (44th and 160th overall).)
2	42	Jacksonville Jaguars	Laviska Shenault	WR	Colorado	
2	43	Chicago Bears	Cole Kmet	TE	Notre Dame	from Las Vegas (Note: No. 43: Las Vegas → Chicago (PD). See Round 1: Chicago → Las Vegas.)
2	44	Cleveland Browns	Grant Delpit	S	LSU	from Indianapolis (Note: No. 44: Indianapolis → Cleveland (D). See Round 2: Cleveland → Indianapolis.)
2	45	Tampa Bay Buccaneers	Antoine Winfield Jr. ^{†}	S	Minnesota	
2	46	Denver Broncos	K. J. Hamler	WR	Penn State	
2	47	Atlanta Falcons	Marlon Davidson	DE	Auburn	
2	48	Seattle Seahawks	Darrell Taylor	DE	Tennessee	from NY Jets (Note: No. 41: NY Jets → Seattle (D). The NY Jets traded a second-round selection (48th overall) to Seattle in exchange for second- and third-round selections (59th and 101st overall).)
2	49	Pittsburgh Steelers	Chase Claypool	WR	Notre Dame	
2	50	Chicago Bears	Jaylon Johnson ^{†}	CB	Utah	
2	51	Dallas Cowboys	Trevon Diggs ^{†}	CB	Alabama	
2	52	Los Angeles Rams	Cam Akers	RB	Florida State	
2	53	Philadelphia Eagles	Jalen Hurts ^{†}	QB	Oklahoma	
2	54	Buffalo Bills	A. J. Epenesa	DE	Iowa	
2	55	Baltimore Ravens	J. K. Dobbins	RB	Ohio State	from New England via Atlanta (Note: No. 55: Multiple trades: New England → Atlanta (PD). New England traded a second-round selection (55th overall) to Atlanta in exchange for WR Mohamed Sanu. Atlanta → Baltimore (PD). Atlanta traded second- and fifth-round selections (55th and 157th overall) to Baltimore in exchange for a fourth-round selection (134th overall) and TE Hayden Hurst.)
2	56	Miami Dolphins	Raekwon Davis	DT	Alabama	from New Orleans (Note: No. 56: New Orleans → Miami (PD). New Orleans traded a second-round selection (56th overall) to Miami in exchange for a 2019 second-round selection.)
2	57	Los Angeles Rams	Van Jefferson	WR	Florida	from Houston (Note: No. 57: Houston → LA Rams (PD). Houston traded a second-round selection (57th overall) to the LA Rams in exchange for a future fourth-round selection and WR Brandin Cooks.)
2	58	Minnesota Vikings	Ezra Cleveland	T	Boise State	
2	59	New York Jets	Denzel Mims	WR	Baylor	from Seattle (Note: No. 59: Seattle → NY Jets (D). See Round 2: NY Jets → Seattle.)
2	60	New England Patriots	Josh Uche	LB	Michigan	from Baltimore (Note: No. 60: Baltimore → New England (D). Baltimore traded second- and fourth-round selections (60th and 129th overall) to New England in exchange for two third-round selections (71st and 98th overall).)
2	61	Tennessee Titans	Kristian Fulton	CB	LSU	
2	62	Green Bay Packers	A. J. Dillon	RB	Boston College	
2	63	Kansas City Chiefs	Willie Gay	LB	Mississippi State	from San Francisco (Note: No. 63: San Francisco → Kansas City (PD). San Francisco traded a second-round selection (63rd overall) to Kansas City in exchange for LB Dee Ford.)
2	64	Carolina Panthers	Jeremy Chinn	S	Southern Illinois	from Kansas City via Seattle (Note: No. 64: Kansas City → Seattle → Carolina.' Multiple trades: Kansas City → Seattle (PD). Kansas City traded a second-round selection (64th overall), and 2019 first- and third-round selections to Seattle in exchange for a 2019 third-round selection and DE Frank Clark. Seattle → Carolina (D). Seattle traded a second-round selection (64th overall) to Carolina in exchange for third- and fifth-round selections (69th and 148th overall).)
3	65	Cincinnati Bengals	Logan Wilson	LB	Wyoming	
3	66	Washington Redskins	Antonio Gibson	RB	Memphis	
3	67	Detroit Lions	Julian Okwara	LB	Notre Dame	
3	68	New York Jets	Ashtyn Davis	S	California	from NY Giants (Note: No. 68: NY Giants → NY Jets (PD). The NY Giants traded a third-round selection (68th overall) and a 2021 fifth-round selection to the NY Jets in exchange for DE Leonard Williams.)
3	69	Seattle Seahawks	Damien Lewis	G	LSU	from Carolina (Note: No. 69: Carolina → Seattle (D). See Round 2: Seattle → Carolina.)
3	70	Miami Dolphins	Brandon Jones	S	Texas	
3	71	Baltimore Ravens	Nnamdi Madubuike ^{†}	DT	Texas A&M	from LA Chargers via New England (Note: No. 71: Multiple trades: LA Chargers → New England (D). See Round 1: New England → LA Chargers. New England → Baltimore (D). See Round 2: Baltimore → New England.)
3	72	Arizona Cardinals	Josh Jones	T	Houston	
3	73	Jacksonville Jaguars	DaVon Hamilton	DT	Ohio State	
3	74	New Orleans Saints	Zack Baun ^{†}	LB	Wisconsin	from Cleveland (Note: No. 74: Cleveland → New Orleans (D). Cleveland traded third- and seventh-round selections (74th and 244th overall) to New Orleans in exchange for a third-round selection (88th overall) and a 2021 third-round selection.)
3	75	Detroit Lions	Jonah Jackson ^{†}	G	Ohio State	from Indianapolis (Note: No. 75: Indianapolis → Detroit (D). Indianapolis traded third- and sixth-round selections (75th and 197th overall) to Detroit in exchange for third-, fifth- and sixth-round selections (85th, 149th and 182nd overall).)
3	76	Tampa Bay Buccaneers	Ke'Shawn Vaughn	RB	Vanderbilt	
3	77	Denver Broncos	Michael Ojemudia	CB	Iowa	
3	78	Atlanta Falcons	Matt Hennessy	C	Temple	
3	79	New York Jets	Jabari Zuniga	DE	Florida	
3	80	Las Vegas Raiders	Lynn Bowden	RB	Kentucky	
3	81	Las Vegas Raiders	Bryan Edwards	WR	South Carolina	from Chicago (Note: No. 81: Chicago → Las Vegas (PD). See Round 1: Chicago → Las Vegas.)
3	82	Dallas Cowboys	Neville Gallimore	DT	Oklahoma	
3	83	Denver Broncos	Lloyd Cushenberry	C	LSU	from Pittsburgh (Note: No. 83: Pittsburgh → Denver (PD). Pittsburgh traded a third-round selection (83rd overall), and 2019 first- and second-round selections to Denver in exchange for a 2019 first-round selection.)
3	84	Los Angeles Rams	Terrell Lewis	LB	Alabama	
3	85	Indianapolis Colts	Julian Blackmon	S	Utah	from Philadelphia via Detroit (Note: No. 85: Multiple trades: Philadelphia → Detroit (PD). Philadelphia traded third- and fifth-round selections (85th and 166th overall) to Detroit in exchange for CB Darius Slay. Detroit → Indianapolis (D). See Round 3: Indianapolis → Detroit.)
3	86	Buffalo Bills	Zack Moss	RB	Utah	
3	87	New England Patriots	Anfernee Jennings	LB	Alabama	
3	88	Cleveland Browns	Jordan Elliott	DT	Missouri	from New Orleans (Note: No. 88: New Orleans → Cleveland (D). See Round 3: Cleveland → New Orleans.)
3	89	Minnesota Vikings	Cameron Dantzler	CB	Mississippi State	
3	90	Houston Texans	Jonathan Greenard ^{†}	LB	Florida	
3	91	New England Patriots	Devin Asiasi	TE	UCLA	from Seattle via Houston and Las Vegas (Note: No. 91: Multiple trades: Seattle → Houston (PD). Seattle traded a third-round selection (91st overall), LB Jacob Martin and LB Barkevious Mingo to Houston in exchange for DE Jadeveon Clowney. Houston → Las Vegas (PD). Houston traded a third-round selection (91st overall) to Las Vegas in exchange for CB Gareon Conley. Las Vegas → New England (D). Las Vegas traded third- and fifth-round selections (91st and 159th overall) to New England in exchange for third-, fourth- and fifth-round selections (100th, 139th and 172nd overall).)
3	92	Baltimore Ravens	Devin Duvernay ^{†}	WR	Texas	
3	93	Tennessee Titans	Darrynton Evans	RB	Appalachian State	
3	94	Green Bay Packers	Josiah Deguara	TE	Cincinnati	
3	95	Denver Broncos	McTelvin Agim	DT	Arkansas	from San Francisco (Note: No. 95: San Francisco → Denver (PD). San Francisco traded third- and fourth-round selections (95th and 137th overall) to Denver in exchange for a fifth-round selection (156th overall) and WR Emmanuel Sanders.)
3	96	Kansas City Chiefs	Lucas Niang	T	TCU	
3*	97	Cleveland Browns	Jacob Phillips	LB	LSU	from Houston (Note: No. 97: Houston → Cleveland (PD). Houston traded a conditional third-round selection (97th overall) to Cleveland in exchange for RB Duke Johnson. The pick was upgraded from the fourth round after Johnson was on Houston's active roster for at least 10 games in 2019.)
3*	98	Baltimore Ravens	Malik Harrison	LB	Ohio State	from New England (Note: No. 98: New England → Baltimore (D). See Round 2: Baltimore → New England.)
3*	99	New York Giants	Matt Peart	T	UConn	
3*	100	Las Vegas Raiders	Tanner Muse	LB	Clemson	from New England (Note: No. 100: New England → Las Vegas (D). See Round 3: Las Vegas → New England.)
3*	101	New England Patriots	Dalton Keene	TE	Virginia Tech	from Seattle via NY Jets (Note: No. 101: Multiple trades: Seattle → NY Jets (D). See Round 2: NY Jets → Seattle. NY Jets → New England (D). The NY Jets traded a third-round selection (101st overall) to New England in exchange for two fourth-round selections (125th and 129th overall) and a 2021 sixth-round selection.)
3*	102	Pittsburgh Steelers	Alex Highsmith	LB	Charlotte	
3*	103	Philadelphia Eagles	Davion Taylor	LB	Colorado	
3*	104	Los Angeles Rams	Terrell Burgess	S	Utah	
3*	105	New Orleans Saints	Adam Trautman	TE	Dayton	from Minnesota (Note: No. 105: Minnesota → New Orleans (D). Minnesota traded a third-round selection (105th overall) to New Orleans in exchange for fourth-, fifth-, sixth- and seventh-round selections (130th, 169th, 203rd and 244th overall).)
3*	106	Baltimore Ravens	Tyre Phillips	G	Mississippi State	
4	107	Cincinnati Bengals	Akeem Davis-Gaither	LB	Appalachian State	
4	108	Washington Redskins	Saahdiq Charles	T	LSU	
4	109	Las Vegas Raiders	John Simpson	G	Clemson	from Detroit (Note: No. 109: Detroit → Las Vegas (D). Detroit traded a fourth-round selection (109th overall) to Las Vegas in exchange for fourth- and fifth-round selections (121st and 172nd overall).)
4	110	New York Giants	Darnay Holmes	CB	UCLA	
4	111	Miami Dolphins	Solomon Kindley	G	Georgia	from Miami via Houston (Note: No. 111: Multiple trades: Miami → Houston (PD). See Round 1: Houston → Miami. Houston → Miami (D). Houston traded a fourth-round selection (111th overall) to Miami in exchange for two fourth-round selections (136th and 141st overall).)
4	112	Los Angeles Chargers	Joshua Kelley	RB	UCLA	
4	113	Carolina Panthers	Troy Pride	CB	Notre Dame	
4	114	Arizona Cardinals	Leki Fotu	DT	Utah	
4	115	Cleveland Browns	Harrison Bryant	TE	Florida Atlantic	
4	116	Jacksonville Jaguars	Ben Bartch	T	Saint John's (MN)	
4	117	Minnesota Vikings	D. J. Wonnum	DE	South Carolina	from Tampa Bay via San Francisco (Note: No. 117: Multiple trades: Tampa Bay → San Francisco (D). See Round 1: San Francisco → Tampa Bay. San Francisco → Minnesota (D). See Round 1: Minnesota → San Francisco.)
4	118	Denver Broncos	Albert Okwuegbunam	TE	Missouri	
4	119	Atlanta Falcons	Mykal Walker	LB	Fresno State	
4	120	New York Jets	La'Mical Perine	RB	Florida	
4	121	Detroit Lions	Logan Stenberg	G	Kentucky	from Las Vegas (Note: No. 121: Las Vegas → Detroit (D). See Round 4: Detroit → Las Vegas.)
4	122	Indianapolis Colts	Jacob Eason	QB	Washington	
4	123	Dallas Cowboys	Reggie Robinson	CB	Tulsa	
4	124	Pittsburgh Steelers	Anthony McFarland Jr.	RB	Maryland	
4	125	New York Jets	James Morgan	QB	FIU	from Chicago via New England (Note: No. 125: Multiple trades: Chicago → New England (PD). Chicago traded a fourth-round selection (125th overall), and 2019 third- and fifth-round selections to New England in exchange for 2019 third- and sixth-round selections. New England → NY Jets (D). See Round 4: NY Jets → New England.)
4	126	Houston Texans	Charlie Heck	T	North Carolina	from LA Rams (Note: LA Rams → Houston (D). The LA Rams traded a fourth-round selection (126th overall) to Houston in exchange for a fourth-round selection and two seventh-round selections (136th, 248th and 250th overall).)
4	127	Philadelphia Eagles	K'Von Wallace	S	Clemson	
4	128	Buffalo Bills	Gabe Davis	WR	UCF	
4	129	New York Jets	Cameron Clark	T	Charlotte	previously from New England via Baltimore and New England (Note: No. 129: Multiple trades: New England → Baltimore (PD). New England traded a fourth-round selection (129th overall) to Baltimore in exchange for a sixth-round selection (207th overall) and OT Jermaine Eluemunor. Baltimore → New England (D). See Round 2: Baltimore → New England. New England → NY Jets (D). See Round 4: NY Jets → New England.)
4	130	Minnesota Vikings	James Lynch	DT	Baylor	from New Orleans (Note: No. 130: New Orleans → Minnesota (D). See Round 4: Minnesota → New Orleans.)
4	131	Arizona Cardinals	Rashard Lawrence	DT	LSU	from Houston (Note: No. 131: Houston → Arizona (PD). See Round 2: Arizona → Houston.)
4	132	Minnesota Vikings	Troy Dye	LB	Oregon	
4	133	Seattle Seahawks	Colby Parkinson	TE	Stanford	
4	134	Atlanta Falcons	Jaylinn Hawkins	S	California	from Baltimore (Note: No. 143: Baltimore → Atlanta (PD). See Round 2: Atlanta → Baltimore.)
4	135	Pittsburgh Steelers	Kevin Dotson	G	Louisiana	from Tennessee via Miami (Note: No. 135: Multiple trades: Tennessee → Miami (PD). Tennessee traded a fourth-round selection (135th overall) and a 2019 seventh-round selection to Miami in exchange for a 2019 sixth-round selection and QB Ryan Tannehill. Miami → Pittsburgh (PD). See Round 1: Pittsburgh → Miami.)
4	136	Los Angeles Rams	Brycen Hopkins	TE	Purdue	from Green Bay via Miami and Houston (Note: No. 136: Multiple trades: Green Bay → Miami (D). See Round 1: Miami → Green Bay. Miami → Houston (D). See Round 4: Houston → Miami. Houston → LA Rams (D). See Round 4: LA Rams → Houston.)
4	137	Jacksonville Jaguars	Josiah Scott	CB	Michigan State	from San Francisco via Denver (Note: No. 137: Multiple trades: San Francisco → Denver (PD). See Round 3: San Francisco → Denver. Denver → Jacksonville (PD). Denver traded a fourth-round selection (137th overall) to Jacksonville in exchange for CB A. J. Bouye.)
4	138	Kansas City Chiefs	L'Jarius Sneed	S	Louisiana Tech	
4*	139	Las Vegas Raiders	Amik Robertson	CB	Louisiana Tech	from Tampa Bay via New England (Note: No. 139: Multiple trades: Tampa Bay → New England (PD). Tampa Bay traded a fourth-round selection (139th overall) to New England in exchange for a seventh-round selection (241st overall) and TE Rob Gronkowski. New England → Las Vegas (D). See Round 3: Las Vegas → New England.)
4*	140	Jacksonville Jaguars	Shaquille Quarterman	LB	Miami (FL)	from Chicago (Note: No. 140: Chicago → Jacksonville (PD). Chicago traded a fourth-round selection (140th overall) to Jacksonville in exchange for QB Nick Foles.)
4*	141	Houston Texans	John Reid	CB	Penn State	from Miami (Note: No. 141: Miami → Houston (D). See Round 4: Houston → Miami.)
4*	142	Washington Redskins	Antonio Gandy-Golden	WR	Liberty	
4*	143	Baltimore Ravens	Ben Bredeson	G	Michigan	
4*	144	Seattle Seahawks	DeeJay Dallas	RB	Miami (FL)	
4*	145	Philadelphia Eagles	Jack Driscoll	G	Auburn	
4*	146	Dallas Cowboys	Tyler Biadasz ^{†}	C	Wisconsin	from Philadelphia (Note: No. 146: Philadelphia → Dallas (D). Philadelphia traded a fourth-round selection (146th overall) to Dallas in exchange for a fifth-round selection (164th overall) and a 2021 fifth-round selection.)
5	147	Cincinnati Bengals	Khalid Kareem	DE	Notre Dame	
5	148	Seattle Seahawks	Alton Robinson	DE	Syracuse	from Washington via Carolina (Note: No. 148: Multiple trades: Washington → Carolina (PD). Washington traded a fifth-round selection (148th overall) to Carolina in exchange for QB Kyle Allen. Carolina → Seattle (D). See Round 2: Seattle → Carolina.)
5	149	Indianapolis Colts	Danny Pinter	G	Ball State	from Detroit (Note: No. 149: Detroit → Indianapolis (D). See Round 3: Indianapolis → Detroit.)
5	150	New York Giants	Shane Lemieux	G	Oregon	
5	151	Los Angeles Chargers	Joe Reed	WR	Virginia	
5	152	Carolina Panthers	Kenny Robinson	S	West Virginia	drafted from St. Louis BattleHawks of XFL
5	153	San Francisco 49ers	Colton McKivitz	T	West Virginia	from Miami via Arizona and Miami (Note: No. 152: Multiple trades: Miami → Arizona (PD). Miami traded a fifth-round selection (153rd overall) and a 2019 second-round selection to Arizona in exchange for QB Josh Rosen. Arizona → Miami (PD). Arizona traded a conditional fifth-round selection (153rd overall) to Miami in exchange for RB Kenyan Drake; the pick would have remained with Arizona if 2019 performance targets had not been met. Miami → San Francisco (D). Miami traded a fifth-round selection (153rd overall) to San Francisco in exchange for RB Matt Breida.)
5	–	Arizona Cardinals	Selection forfeited during the 2019 supplemental draft. (Note: Arizona forfeited a fifth-round selection after selecting Jalen Thompson in the 2019 supplemental draft.)			
5	154	Miami Dolphins	Jason Strowbridge	DE	North Carolina	from Jacksonville via Pittsburgh (Note: No. 154: Multiple trades: Jacksonville → Pittsburgh (PD). Jacksonville traded a fifth-round selection (154th overall) to Pittsburgh in exchange for QB Joshua Dobbs. Pittsburgh → Miami (PD). See Round 1: Pittsburgh → Miami.)
5	155	Chicago Bears	Trevis Gipson	LB	Tulsa	from Cleveland via Buffalo and Minnesota (Note: No. 155: Multiple trades: Cleveland → Buffalo (PD). Cleveland traded fifth- and sixth-round selections (155th and 188th overall) to Buffalo in exchange for a 2021 seventh-round selection and G Wyatt Teller. Buffalo → Minnesota (PD). See Round 1: Buffalo → Minnesota. Minnesota → Chicago (D). Minnesota traded a fifth-round selection (155th overall) to Chicago in exchange for a 2021 fourth-round selection.)
5	156	Washington Redskins	Keith Ismael	C	San Diego State	from Denver via San Francisco (Note: No. 156: Multiple trades: Denver → San Francisco (PD). See Round 3: San Francisco → Denver. San Francisco → Washington (D). San Francisco traded a fifth-round selection (156th overall) and a 2021 third-round selection to Washington in exchange for OT Trent Williams.)
5	157	Jacksonville Jaguars	Daniel Thomas	S	Auburn	from Atlanta via Baltimore (Note: No. 157: Multiple trades: Atlanta → Baltimore (PD). See Round 2: Baltimore → Atlanta. Baltimore → Jacksonville (PD). Baltimore traded a fifth-round selection (157th overall) to Jacksonville in exchange for DE Calais Campbell.)
5	158	New York Jets	Bryce Hall	CB	Virginia	
5	159	New England Patriots	Justin Rohrwasser	K	Marshall	from Las Vegas (Note: No. 159: Las Vegas → New England (D). See Round 3: Las Vegas → New England.)
5	160	Cleveland Browns	Nick Harris	C	Washington	from Indianapolis (Note: No. 160: Indianapolis → Cleveland (D). See Round 2: Cleveland → Indianapolis.)
5	161	Tampa Bay Buccaneers	Tyler Johnson	WR	Minnesota	
5	162	Washington Redskins	Khaleke Hudson	LB	Michigan	from Pittsburgh via Seattle (Note: No. 162: Multiple trades: Pittsburgh → Seattle (PD). Pittsburgh traded a fifth-round selection (162nd overall) to Seattle in exchange for TE Nick Vannett. Seattle → Washington (PD). Seattle traded a fifth-round selection (162nd overall) to Washington in exchange for CB Quinton Dunbar.)
5	163	Chicago Bears	Kindle Vildor	CB	Georgia Southern	
5	164	Miami Dolphins	Curtis Weaver	DE	Boise State	from Dallas via Philadelphia (Note: No. 164: Multiple trades: Dallas → Philadelphia (D). See Round 4: Philadelphia → Dallas. Philadelphia → Miami (D). Philadelphia traded a fifth-round selection (164th overall) to Miami in exchange for fifth- and seventh-round selections (173rd and 227th overall).)
5	165	Jacksonville Jaguars	Collin Johnson	WR	Texas	from LA Rams (Note: No. 165: LA Rams → Jacksonville (PD). The LA Rams traded a fifth-round selection (165th overall) and a 2019 third-round selection to Jacksonville in exchange for DE Dante Fowler.)
5	166	Detroit Lions	Quintez Cephus	WR	Wisconsin	from Philadelphia (Note: No. 166: Philadelphia → Detroit (PD). See Round 3: Philadelphia → Detroit.)
5	167	Buffalo Bills	Jake Fromm	QB	Georgia	
5	168	Philadelphia Eagles	John Hightower	WR	Boise State	from New England (Note: No. 168: New England → Philadelphia (PD). New England traded a fifth-round selection (168th overall) to Philadelphia in exchange for a seventh-round selection (235th overall) and DE Michael Bennett.)
5	169	Minnesota Vikings	Harrison Hand	CB	Temple	from New Orleans (Note: No. 169: New Orleans → Minnesota (D). See Round 4: Minnesota → New Orleans.)
5	170	Baltimore Ravens	Broderick Washington Jr.	DT	Texas Tech	from Minnesota (Note: No. 170: Minnesota → Baltimore (PD). Minnesota traded a fifth-round selection (170th overall) to Baltimore in exchange for K Kaare Vedvik.)
5	171	Houston Texans	Isaiah Coulter	WR	Rhode Island	
5	172	Detroit Lions	Jason Huntley	RB	New Mexico State	from Seattle via Detroit, New England and Las Vegas (Note: No. 172: Multiple trades: Seattle → Detroit (PD). Seattle traded a fifth-round selection (172nd overall) to Detroit in exchange for a 2021 seventh-round selection and S Quandre Diggs. Detroit → New England (PD). Detroit traded a fifth-round selection (172nd overall) to New England in exchange for a seventh-round selection (235th overall) and S Duron Harmon. New England → Las Vegas (D). See Round 3: Las Vegas → New England. Las Vegas → Detroit (D). See Round 4: Detroit → Las Vegas.)
5	173	Chicago Bears	Darnell Mooney	WR	Tulane	from Baltimore via LA Rams, Miami and Philadelphia (Note: No. 173: Multiple trades: Baltimore → LA Rams (PD). Baltimore traded a fifth-round selection (173rd overall) and LB Kenny Young to the LA Rams in exchange for CB Marcus Peters. LA Rams → Miami (PD). The LA Rams traded a fifth-round selection (173rd overall) and CB Aqib Talib to Miami in exchange for a 2022 seventh-round selection. Miami → Philadelphia (D). See Round 5: Philadelphia → Miami. Philadelphia → Chicago (D). Philadelphia traded fifth- and seventh-round selections (173rd and 227th overall) to Chicago in exchange for two fifth-round selections and a seventh-round selection (196th, 200th and 233rd overall).)
5	174	Tennessee Titans	Larrell Murchison	DT	NC State	
5	175	Green Bay Packers	Kamal Martin	LB	Minnesota	
5	176	Minnesota Vikings	K. J. Osborn	WR	Miami (FL)	from San Francisco (Note: No. 176: San Francisco → Minnesota (D). See Round 1: Minnesota → San Francisco.)
5	177	Kansas City Chiefs	Mike Danna	DE	Michigan	
5*	178	Denver Broncos	Justin Strnad	LB	Wake Forest	
5*	179	Dallas Cowboys	Bradlee Anae	DE	Utah	
6	180	Cincinnati Bengals	Hakeem Adeniji	T	Kansas	
6	181	Denver Broncos	Netane Muti	G	Fresno State	from Washington (Note: No. 181: Washington → Denver (PD). Washington traded a sixth-round selection (181st overall) to Denver in exchange for a seventh-round selection (229th overall) and QB Case Keenum.)
6	182	New England Patriots	Michael Onwenu	G	Michigan	from Detroit via Indianapolis (Note: No. 182: Multiple trades: Detroit → Indianapolis (D). See Round 3: Indianapolis → Detroit. Indianapolis → New England (D). Indianapolis traded a sixth-round selection (182nd overall) to New England in exchange for two sixth-round selections (212th and 213th overall).)
6	183	New York Giants	Cam Brown	LB	Penn State	
6	184	Carolina Panthers	Bravvion Roy	DT	Baylor	
6	185	Miami Dolphins	Blake Ferguson	LS	LSU	
6	186	Los Angeles Chargers	Alohi Gilman	S	Notre Dame	
6	187	Cleveland Browns	Donovan Peoples-Jones	WR	Michigan	from Arizona (Note: No. 187: Arizona → Cleveland (PD). Arizona traded a sixth-round selection (187th overall) to Cleveland in exchange for CB Jamar Taylor.)
6	188	Buffalo Bills	Tyler Bass	K	Georgia Southern	from Cleveland (Note: No. 188: Cleveland → Buffalo (PD). See Round 5: Cleveland → Buffalo.)
6	189	Jacksonville Jaguars	Jake Luton	QB	Oregon State	
6	190	San Francisco 49ers	Charlie Woerner	TE	Georgia	from Atlanta via Philadelphia (Note: No. 190: Multiple trades: Atlanta → Philadelphia (PD). Atlanta traded a sixth-round selection (190th overall) and LB Duke Riley to Philadelphia in exchange for S Johnathan Cyprien and a seventh-round selection. Philadelphia → San Francisco (D). Philadelphia traded a sixth-round selection (190th overall) to San Francisco in exchange for a sixth-round selection (210th overall) and WR Marquise Goodwin.)
6	191	New York Jets	Braden Mann	P	Texas A&M	
6	192	Green Bay Packers	Jon Runyan Jr.	G	Michigan	from Las Vegas (Note: No. 192: Las Vegas → Green Bay (PD). Las Vegas traded a sixth-round selection (192nd overall) to Green Bay in exchange for WR Trevor Davis.)
6	193	Indianapolis Colts	Robert Windsor	DT	Penn State	
6	194	Tampa Bay Buccaneers	Khalil Davis	DT	Nebraska	
6	195	New England Patriots	Justin Herron	T	Wake Forest	from Denver (Note: No. 195: Denver → New England (PD). Denver traded a sixth-round selection (195th overall) to New England in exchange for a seventh-round selection (237th overall) and CB Duke Dawson.)
6	196	Philadelphia Eagles	Shaun Bradley	LB	Temple	from Chicago (Note: No. 196: Chicago → Philadelphia (D). See Round 5: Philadelphia → Chicago.)
6	197	Detroit Lions	John Penisini	DT	Utah	from Dallas via Miami and Indianapolis (Note: No. 197: Multiple trades: Dallas → Miami (PD). Dallas traded a sixth-round selection (197th overall) to Miami in exchange for DE Robert Quinn. Miami → Indianapolis (PD). Miami traded a sixth-round selection (197th overall) to Indianapolis in exchange for a conditional seventh-round selection (227th overall) and C Evan Boehm. Indianapolis → Detroit (D). See Round 3: Indianapolis → Detroit.)
6	198	Pittsburgh Steelers	Antoine Brooks	S	Maryland	
6	199	Los Angeles Rams	Jordan Fuller	S	Ohio State	
6	200	Philadelphia Eagles	Quez Watkins	WR	Southern Miss	from Philadelphia via Chicago (Note: No. 200: Multiple trades: Philadelphia → Chicago (PD). Philadelphia traded a conditional sixth-round selection (200th overall) to Chicago in exchange for RB Jordan Howard. Chicago → Philadelphia (D). See Round 5: Philadelphia → Chicago.)
6	201	Baltimore Ravens	James Proche	WR	SMU	from Buffalo via Minnesota (Note: No. 201: Multiple trades: Buffalo → Minnesota (PD). See Round 1: Buffalo → Minnesota. Minnesota → Baltimore (D). Minnesota traded sixth- and seventh-round selections (201st and 219th overall) to Baltimore in exchange for a seventh-round selection (225th overall) and a 2021 fifth-round selection.)
6	202	Arizona Cardinals	Evan Weaver	LB	California	from New England (Note: No. 202: New England → Arizona (PD). New England traded a sixth-round selection (202nd overall) to Arizona in exchange for OT Korey Cunningham.)
6	203	Minnesota Vikings	Blake Brandel	T	Oregon State	from New Orleans (Note: No. 203: New Orleans → Minnesota (D). See Round 4: Minnesota → New Orleans.)
6	204	New England Patriots	Cassh Maluia	LB	Wyoming	from Houston (Note: No. 204: Houston → New England (PD). Houston traded a sixth-round selection (204th overall) to New England in exchange for CB Keion Crossen.)
6	205	Minnesota Vikings	Josh Metellus	S	Michigan	
6	206	Jacksonville Jaguars	Tyler Davis	TE	Georgia Tech	from Seattle (Note: No. 206: Seattle → Jacksonville (PD). Seattle traded a sixth-round selection (206th overall) to Jacksonville in exchange for a 2019 seventh-round selection.)
6	207	Buffalo Bills	Isaiah Hodgins	WR	Oregon State	from Baltimore via New England (Note: No. 207: Multiple trades: Baltimore → New England (PD). See Round 4: New England → Baltimore. New England → Buffalo (PD). New England traded a sixth-round selection (207th overall) to Buffalo in exchange for C Russell Bodine.)
6	208	Green Bay Packers	Jake Hanson	C	Oregon	from Tennessee (Note: No. 208: Tennessee → Green Bay (PD). Tennessee traded a conditional sixth-round selection (208th overall) to Green Bay in exchange for LB Reggie Gilbert.)
6	209	Green Bay Packers	Simon Stepaniak	G	Indiana	
6	210	Philadelphia Eagles	Prince Tega Wanogho	T	Auburn	from San Francisco (Note: No. 210: San Francisco → Philadelphia (D). See Round 6: Philadelphia → San Francisco.)
6	211	Indianapolis Colts	Isaiah Rodgers	CB	UMass	from Kansas City via NY Jets (Note: No. 211: Multiple trades: Kansas City → NY Jets (PD). Kansas City traded a sixth-round selection (211th overall) to the NY Jets in exchange for LB Darron Lee. NY Jets → Indianapolis (D). The NY Jets traded a sixth-round selection (211th overall) to Indianapolis in exchange for CB Quincy Wilson.)
6*	212	Indianapolis Colts	Dezmon Patmon	WR	Washington State	from New England (Note: No. 212: New England → Indianapolis (D). See Round 6: Indianapolis → New England.)
6*	213	Indianapolis Colts	Jordan Glasgow	LB	Michigan	from New England (Note: No. 213: New England → Indianapolis (D). See Round 6: Indianapolis → New England.)
6*	214	Seattle Seahawks	Freddie Swain	WR	Florida	
7	215	Cincinnati Bengals	Markus Bailey	LB	Purdue	
7	216	Washington Redskins	Kamren Curl	S	Arkansas	
7	217	San Francisco 49ers	Jauan Jennings	WR	Tennessee	from Detroit (Note: No. 217: Detroit → San Francisco (PD). Detroit traded a conditional seventh-round selection (217th overall) to San Francisco in exchange for LB Eli Harold.)
7	218	New York Giants	Carter Coughlin	LB	Minnesota	
7	219	Baltimore Ravens	Geno Stone	S	Iowa	from Miami via Minnesota (Note: No. 219: Multiple trades: Miami → Minnesota (PD). Miami traded a seventh-round selection (219th overall) to Minnesota in exchange for G Danny Isidora. Minnesota → Baltimore (D). See Round 6: Minnesota → Baltimore.)
7	220	Los Angeles Chargers	K. J. Hill	WR	Ohio State	
7	221	Carolina Panthers	Stantley Thomas-Oliver	CB	FIU	
7	222	Arizona Cardinals	Eno Benjamin	RB	Arizona State	
7	223	Jacksonville Jaguars	Chris Claybrooks	CB	Memphis	
7	224	Tennessee Titans	Cole McDonald	QB	Hawaii	from Cleveland (Note: No. 224: Cleveland → Tennessee (PD). Cleveland traded a seventh-round selection (224th overall) to Tennessee in exchange for WR Taywan Taylor.)
7	225	Minnesota Vikings	Kenny Willekes	DE	Michigan State	from NY Jets via Baltimore (Note: No. 225: Multiple trades: NY Jets → Baltimore (PD). The NY Jets traded a conditional seventh-round selection (225th overall) to Baltimore in exchange for G Alex Lewis. Baltimore → Minnesota (D). See Round 6: Minnesota → Baltimore.)
7	226	Chicago Bears	Arlington Hambright	G	Colorado	from Las Vegas (Note: No. 226: Las Vegas → Chicago (PD). See Round 1: Chicago → Las Vegas.)
7	227	Chicago Bears	Lachavious Simmons	T	Tennessee State	from Indianapolis via Miami and Philadelphia (Note: No. 227: Multiple trades: Indianapolis → Miami (PD). See Round 6: Miami → Indianapolis. Miami → Philadelphia (D). See Round 5: Philadelphia → Miami. Philadelphia → Chicago (D). See Round 5: Philadelphia → Chicago.)
7	228	Atlanta Falcons	Sterling Hofrichter	P	Syracuse	from Tampa Bay via Philadelphia (Note: No. 228: Multiple trades: Tampa Bay → Philadelphia (PD). Tampa Bay traded a seventh-round selection (228th overall) and WR DeSean Jackson to Philadelphia in exchange for a 2019 sixth-round selection. Philadelphia → Atlanta (PD). See Round 6: Atlanta → Philadelphia.)
7	229	Washington Redskins	James Smith-Williams	DE	NC State	from Denver (Note: No. 229: Denver → Washington (PD). See Round 6: Washington → Denver.)
7	230	New England Patriots	Dustin Woodard	C	Memphis	from Atlanta (Note: No. 230: Atlanta → New England (PD). Atlanta traded a seventh-round selection (230th overall) to New England in exchange for S Jordan Richards.)
7	231	Dallas Cowboys	Ben DiNucci	QB	James Madison	
7	232	Pittsburgh Steelers	Carlos Davis	DT	Nebraska	
7	233	Philadelphia Eagles	Casey Toohill	LB	Stanford	from Chicago (Note: No. 233: Chicago → Philadelphia (D). See Round 5: Philadelphia → Chicago.)
7	234	Los Angeles Rams	Clay Johnston	LB	Baylor	
7	235	Detroit Lions	Jashon Cornell	DT	Ohio State	from Philadelphia via New England (Note: No. 235: Multiple trades: Philadelphia → New England (PD). See Round 5: New England → Philadelphia. New England → Detroit (PD). See Round 5: Detroit → New England.)
7	236	Green Bay Packers	Vernon Scott	S	TCU	from Buffalo via Cleveland (Note: No. 236: Multiple trades: Buffalo → Cleveland (PD). Buffalo traded a seventh-round selection (236th overall) to Cleveland in exchange for WR Corey Coleman. Cleveland → Green Bay (PD). Cleveland traded a seventh-round selection to Green Bay in exchange for a seventh-round selection and G Justin McCray.)
7	237	Kansas City Chiefs	BoPete Keyes	CB	Tulane	from New England via Denver and Tennessee (Note: No. 237: Multiple trades: New England → Denver (PD). See Round 6: Denver → New England. Denver → Tennessee (PD). Denver traded a seventh-round selection (237th overall) to Tennessee in exchange for DE Jurrell Casey. Tennessee → Kansas City (D). Tennessee traded a seventh-round selection (237th overall) to Kansas City in exchange for a 2021 sixth-round selection)
7	238	New York Giants	T. J. Brunson	LB	South Carolina	from New Orleans (Note: No. 238: New Orleans → NY Giants (PD). New Orleans traded a seventh-round selection (238th overall) and a 2019 fourth-round selection to the NY Giants in exchange for CB Eli Apple.)
7	239	Buffalo Bills	Dane Jackson	CB	Pittsburgh	from Minnesota (Note: No. 239: Minnesota → Buffalo. See Round 1: Buffalo → Minnesota.)
7	240	New Orleans Saints	Tommy Stevens	QB	Mississippi State	from Houston (Note: No. 240: Houston → New Orleans (D). Houston traded a seventh-round selection (240th overall) to New Orleans in exchange for a 2021 sixth-round selection.)
7	241	Tampa Bay Buccaneers	Chapelle Russell	LB	Temple	from Seattle via New England (Note: No. 241: Multiple trades: Seattle → New England (PD). Seattle traded a seventh-round selection (241st overall) to New England in exchange for TE Jacob Hollister. New England → Tampa Bay (PD). See Round 4: Tampa Bay → New England.)
7	242	Green Bay Packers	Jonathan Garvin	DE	Miami (FL)	from Baltimore (Note: No. 242: Baltimore → Green Bay (PD). Baltimore traded a seventh-round selection (242nd overall) to Green Bay in exchange for RB Ty Montgomery.)
7	243	Tennessee Titans	Chris Jackson	CB	Marshall	
7	244	Minnesota Vikings	Nate Stanley	QB	Iowa	from Green Bay via Cleveland and New Orleans (Note: No. 241: Multiple trades: Green Bay → Cleveland (PD). See Round 7: Cleveland → Green Bay. Cleveland → New Orleans (D). See Round 3: Cleveland → New Orleans. New Orleans → Minnesota (D). See Round 4: Minnesota → New Orleans.)
7	245	Tampa Bay Buccaneers	Raymond Calais	RB	Louisiana	from San Francisco (Note: No. 245: San Francisco → Tampa Bay (D). See Round 1: San Francisco → Tampa Bay.)
7	246	Miami Dolphins	Malcolm Perry	RB	Navy	from Kansas City (Note: No. 246: Kansas City → Miami (PD). Kansas City traded a seventh-round selection (246th overall) to Miami in exchange for S Jordan Lucas.)
7*	247	New York Giants	Chris Williamson	CB	Minnesota	
7*	248	Los Angeles Rams	Sam Sloman	K	Miami (OH)	from Houston (Note: No. 248: Houston → LA Rams (D). See Round 4: LA Rams → Houston.)
7*	249	Minnesota Vikings	Brian Cole II	LB	Mississippi State	
7*	250	Los Angeles Rams	Tremayne Anchrum	G	Clemson	from Houston (Note: No. 250: Houston → LA Rams (D). See Round 4: LA Rams → Houston.)
7*	251	Seattle Seahawks	Stephen Sullivan	TE	LSU	from Miami (Note: No. 251: Miami → Seattle (D). Miami traded a seventh-round selection (251st overall) in exchange for a 2021 sixth-round selection.)
7*	252	Denver Broncos	Tyrie Cleveland	WR	Florida	
7*	253	Minnesota Vikings	Kyle Hinton	C	Washburn	
7*	254	Denver Broncos	Derrek Tuszka	LB	North Dakota State	
7*	255	New York Giants	Tae Crowder	LB	Georgia	Mr. Irrelevant

== Notable undrafted players ==
Original NFL team	Player	Pos.	College	Notes
Arizona Cardinals	Jonathan Ward	RB	Central Michigan	
Atlanta Falcons	Dee Alford	CB	Tusculum	
Atlanta Falcons	Tyler Hall	CB	Wyoming	
Baltimore Ravens	Trystan Colon	C	Missouri	
Baltimore Ravens	Khalil Dorsey	CB	Northern Arizona	
Baltimore Ravens	Tyler Huntley ^{†}	QB	Utah	
Baltimore Ravens	Kristian Welch	LB	Iowa	
Baltimore Ravens	Ty'Son Williams	RB	BYU	
Buffalo Bills	Reggie Gilliam	FB	Toledo	
Carolina Panthers	Myles Adams	DE	Rice	
Carolina Panthers	Joseph Charlton	P	South Carolina	
Carolina Panthers	Sam Franklin Jr.	S	Temple	
Carolina Panthers	Myles Hartsfield	S	Ole Miss	
Carolina Panthers	Giovanni Ricci	FB	Western Michigan	
Carolina Panthers	Sam Tecklenburg	C	Baylor	
Cincinnati Bengals	Mitchell Wilcox	TE	South Florida	
Cleveland Browns	A. J. Green	CB	Oklahoma State	
Dallas Cowboys	Rico Dowdle	RB	South Carolina	
Dallas Cowboys	Terence Steele	T	Texas Tech	
Denver Broncos	Essang Bassey	CB	Wake Forest	
Denver Broncos	Kendall Hinton	WR	Wake Forest	
Detroit Lions	Arryn Siposs	P	Auburn	
Green Bay Packers	Krys Barnes	LB	UCLA	
Green Bay Packers	Henry Black	S	Baylor	
Green Bay Packers	Patrick Taylor	RB	Memphis	
Indianapolis Colts	Rodrigo Blankenship	K	Georgia	
Indianapolis Colts	Chris Williams	DT	Wagner	
Jacksonville Jaguars	Ross Matiscik ^{†}	LS	Baylor	
Jacksonville Jaguars	James Robinson	RB	Illinois State	Fourth undrafted rookie running back to surpass 1,000 rushing yards
Kansas City Chiefs	Tommy Townsend ^{†}	P	Florida	
Kansas City Chiefs	Tershawn Wharton	DT	Missouri S&T	
Kansas City Chiefs	Cody White	WR	Michigan State	
Los Angeles Chargers	Cole Christiansen	LB	Army	
Los Angeles Chargers	Breiden Fehoko	DT	LSU	
Los Angeles Chargers	Gabe Nabers	FB	Florida State	
Los Angeles Rams	Michael Hoecht	DT	Brown	
Los Angeles Rams	Bryce Perkins	QB	Virginia	
Los Angeles Rams	Christian Rozeboom	LB	South Dakota State	
Los Angeles Rams	Jonah Williams	DT	Weber State	
Miami Dolphins	Benito Jones	DT	Ole Miss	
Minnesota Vikings	Dan Chisena	WR	Penn State	
Minnesota Vikings	Blake Lynch	LB	Baylor	
New England Patriots	Myles Bryant	CB	Washington	
New England Patriots	J. J. Taylor	RB	Arizona	
New Orleans Saints	Joe Bachie	LB	Michigan State	
New Orleans Saints	Marquez Callaway	WR	Tennessee	
New Orleans Saints	Blake Gillikin	P	Penn State	
New Orleans Saints	Juwan Johnson	TE	Oregon	
New Orleans Saints	Tony Jones Jr.	RB	Notre Dame	
New Orleans Saints	Malcolm Roach	DT	Texas	
New Orleans Saints	Calvin Throckmorton	T	Oregon	
New York Jets	Javelin Guidry	CB	Utah	
New York Jets	Bryce Huff	LB	Memphis	
Philadelphia Eagles	Grayland Arnold	CB	Baylor	
Philadelphia Eagles	Elijah Riley	S	Army	
Pittsburgh Steelers	James Pierre	CB	Florida Atlantic	
Pittsburgh Steelers	Corliss Waitman	P	South Alabama	
San Francisco 49ers	Salvon Ahmed	RB	Washington	
San Francisco 49ers	Jonas Griffith	LB	Indiana State	
San Francisco 49ers	JaMycal Hasty	RB	Baylor	
Tampa Bay Buccaneers	Cam Gill	LB	Wagner	
Tampa Bay Buccaneers	Nick Leverett	C	Rice	
Tennessee Titans	Aaron Brewer	G	Texas State	
Tennessee Titans	Teair Tart	DT	FIU	
Tennessee Titans	Nick Westbrook-Ikhine	WR	Indiana	

== Trades within the draft ==
(PD) indicates trades completed prior to the start of the draft (i.e. Pre-Draft), while (D) denotes trades which took place during the 2020 draft.

Round 1

Round 2

Round 3

Round 4

Round 5

Round 6

Round 7

== Media coverage ==
Coverage of all three days of the draft aired on ABC, ESPN, NFL Network, ESPN Deportes and ESPN Radio. ESPN and NFL Network aired shared coverage of all three days hosted by Trey Wingo from ESPN's studios in Bristol, which was simulcast by ABC for the third day. Rece Davis, Jesse Palmer and Maria Taylor, all from College GameDay, hosted ABC's telecasts for the first two days. Jennifer Hudson was announced to perform as part of a Draft Preshow on the first day, followed by Kelly Clarkson on the second day and OneRepublic on the third.

ESPN Deportes provided Spanish language coverage of the draft with Monday Night Football voices Eduardo Varela and Pablo Viruega. ESPN Radio's coverage featured host Dari Nowkhah from ESPN's SEC Network, former general manager Mike Tannenbaum, ESPN New York's Bart Scott (Thursday/Friday), NFL Draft analyst Jim Nagy (Saturday) and reporter Ian Fitzsimmons with updates from Marc Kestecher.

== Summary ==
=== Selections by NCAA conference ===
Conference	Round 1	Round 2	Round 3	Round 4	Round 5	Round 6	Round 7	Total
NCAA Division I FBS football conferences
American	0	0	5	2	3	2	5	17
ACC	3	3	2	5	7	2	5	27
Big 12	5	3	4	1	4	2	2	21
Big Ten	5	7	5	6	5	11	9	48
C-USA	0	0	1	5	1	1	2	10
Ind. (FBS)	0	2	1	2	2	2	0	9
MAC	0	0	0	0	1	0	1	2
MW	1	1	1	1	3	2	1	10
Pac-12	3	3	6	7	3	7	3	32
SEC	15	10	15	8	2	5	8	63
Sun Belt	0	1	1	2	1	1	1	7
NCAA Division I FCS football conferences
CAA	0	0	0	0	1	0	1	2
MVFC	0	1	0	0	0	0	1	2
OVC	0	0	0	0	0	0	1	1
Pioneer	0	0	1	0	0	0	0	1
Non-Division I NCAA football conferences
MIAA (DII)	0	0	0	0	0	0	1	1
MIAC (DIII)	0	0	0	1	0	0	0	1
SAC (DII)	0	1	0	0	0	0	0	1

=== Colleges with multiple draft selections ===
Selections	Colleges
14	LSU
10	Michigan, Ohio State
9	Alabama
7	Clemson, Florida, Georgia, Utah
6	Auburn, Notre Dame
5	Iowa, Minnesota, Mississippi State, Penn State, TCU
4	Baylor, Miami (FL), Oklahoma, Oregon, South Carolina, Temple, Wisconsin
3	Boise State, California, Colorado, Louisiana, Memphis, Oregon State, Texas, UCLA
2	Appalachian State, Arizona State, Arkansas, Charlotte, Florida International, Fresno State, Georgia Southern, Kentucky, Louisiana Tech, Marshall, Maryland, Michigan State, Missouri, NC State, Nebraska, North Carolina, Purdue, Stanford, Syracuse, Tennessee, Texas A&M, Texas Tech, Tulane, Tulsa, USC, Virginia, Wake Forest, Washington, West Virginia, Wyoming

=== Selections by position ===
Position	Round 1	Round 2	Round 3	Round 4	Round 5	Round 6	Round 7	Total
Center	1	0	2	1	2	1	2	9
Cornerback	6	3	2	6	3	1	6	27
Defensive end	2	4	1	1	6	0	4	17
Defensive tackle	2	4	5	2	2	4	1	20
Guard	0	1	3	6	2	4	2	18
Kicker	0	0	0	0	1	1	1	3
Linebacker	4	2	11	4	4	5	8	39
Long snapper	0	0	0	0	0	1	0	1
Offensive tackle	6	1	3	4	1	4	1	20
Punter	0	0	0	0	0	1	1	2
Quarterback	4	1	0	2	1	1	4	13
Running back	1	5	5	4	1	0	3	19
Safety	0	5	4	3	2	4	3	21
Tight end	0	1	4	4	0	2	1	12
Wide receiver	6	7	2	2	8	6	3	34

Position	Round 1	Round 2	Round 3	Round 4	Round 5	Round 6	Round 7	Total
Offense	18	16	19	23	15	18	15	124
Defense	14	16	23	17	17	14	24	125
Special teams	0	0	0	0	1	3	2	6
