= Dennis Biodrowski =

American football player (1940–2014)

No. 61, 60
- Position: Guard

Personal information
- Born: June 27, 1940; Gary, Indiana, U.S.
- Died: October 20, 2014 (aged 74); Fort Worth, Texas, U.S.
- Listed height: 6 ft 1 in (1.85 m)
- Listed weight: 250 lb (113 kg)

Career information
- High school: William A. Wirt (Gary)
- College: Memphis
- NFL draft: 1962: 16th round, 221st overall pick
- AFL draft: 1962: 18th round, 144th overall pick

Career history
- Kansas City Chiefs (1963-1967); Hamilton Tiger-Cats (1968)

Awards and highlights
- AFL Championship (1966)

Career AFL statistics
- Games played: 30
- Fumble recoveries: 1
- Stats at Pro Football Reference

Dennis "Denny" James Biodrowski (June 27, 1940 – October 20, 2014) was an American football guard who played five seasons in the National Football League (NFL) for the Kansas City Chiefs from 1963 to 1967. He played in the 1966 AFL Championship game as well as Super Bowl I as substitutes and for special teams plays.

He was originally signed as a free agent. In October 2014, he died at the age of 74.
