= Charlie Killett =

American football player (1940–2021)

No. 37
- Position: Halfback

Personal information
- Born: November 8, 1940; Helena, Arkansas, U.S.
- Died: May 10, 2021 (aged 80); Paris, Tennessee, U.S.
- Listed height: 6 ft 1 in (1.85 m)
- Listed weight: 205 lb (93 kg)

Career information
- High school: Arkansas Central
- College: Memphis State
- NFL draft: 1963: 29th round, 228th overall pick

Career history
- New York Giants (1963)

Career NFL statistics
- Games played: 13
- Games started: 0
- Stats at Pro Football Reference

Charles William Killett (November 8, 1940 — May 10, 2021) was a former American football halfback who played for the New York Giants of the National Football League (NFL). He was drafted by the Giants in the 16th round of the 1963 NFL draft and the Buffalo Bills in the 29th round of the 1963 AFL draft. He signed with the Ottawa Rough Riders.

In February 1963, Killett was dropped from the Memphis State Tigers for not attending classes. He later signed with the Giants, forgoing his final year of college eligibility. He broke two ribs during Giants' training camp in July 1963.

== Career statistics ==
Year	Team	GP	Att	Yds	Avg	TD
1963	New York Giants	13	11	36	3.3	0
Career		13	11	36	3.3	0
