= Dustin Woodard =

American football player (born 1998)

Profile
- Position: Center

Personal information
- Born: March 8, 1998 (age 28); Chandler, Arizona, U.S.
- Listed height: 6 ft 2 in (1.88 m)
- Listed weight: 291 lb (132 kg)

Career information
- High school: Chandler
- College: Memphis (2016–2019)
- NFL draft: 2020: 7th round, 230th overall pick

Career history
- New England Patriots (2020–2021)*
- * Offseason or practice squad member only

Awards and highlights
- First-team All-AAC (2018); Second-team All-AAC (2019)
- Stats at Pro Football Reference

Dustin Woodard (born March 8, 1998) is an American former football center. He was selected by the New England Patriots in the seventh round of the 2020 NFL draft after playing college football at Memphis.

== Early life ==
Woodard played at Chandler High School in Chandler, Arizona. He was named the best offensive lineman in the state of Arizona after his senior season, and committed to Memphis in January 2016. Woodard chose the Tigers over six other schools, including Stanford, Navy, and Army.

== College career ==
Playing at Memphis, Woodard started 52 games to close out his career, playing his freshman and sophomore seasons at left guard, his junior year at right guard and his senior year at center. He tied the school record with 54 total games played in. Woodard garnered first-team all-American Athletic Conference honors following his junior season and was a second-team selection to that same list after his senior season. He was also on the Outland Trophy and Rimington Trophy watchlists his senior year, and earned praise for his run blocking ability.

== Professional career ==
The New England Patriots selected Woodard in the seventh round with the 230th overall pick in the 2020 NFL draft. On August 13, during his rookie training camp, he decided to retire from the NFL. Woodard unretired on April 7, 2021, and the Patriots reinstated him to their active roster. He was waived on April 16.
