= Jacobi Francis =

American football player (born 1998)

Profile
- Position: Safety

Personal information
- Born: September 6, 1998 (age 28); Covington, Georgia, U.S.
- Listed height: 5 ft 11 in (1.80 m)
- Listed weight: 193 lb (88 kg)

Career information
- High school: Newton (GA)
- College: Memphis
- NFL draft: 2022: undrafted

Career history
- Houston Texans (2022–2023); Minnesota Vikings (2024)*
- * Offseason or practice squad member only

Career NFL statistics
- Tackles: 1
- Stats at Pro Football Reference

Jacobi Francis (born September 6, 1998) is an American professional football safety. He played college football at Memphis and was signed by the Houston Texans as an undrafted free agent in 2022.

== Early life and college ==
Francis was born on September 6, 1998, in Covington, Georgia. He played football for two years at Newton High School and recorded 50 tackles, earning honorable mention all-county honors. He committed to play college football at the University of Memphis, and redshirted as a true freshman in 2016. In 2017, Francis appeared in 12 of 13 games and recorded six tackles.

As a redshirt-sophomore in 2018, Francis appeared in all 14 matches and posted 24 tackles, an interception, and a fumble forced and recovered. He had five multi-tackle performances that season and was the only player on the team to have an interception, fumble recovery and forced fumble. Francis tallied 35 tackles as a junior and also made one interception as he started every game.

During the 2020 season, Francis started nine games and helped Memphis compile a 8–3 record, while totaling 28 tackles, seven pass breakups and two interceptions. After being given an extra year of eligibility due to the COVID-19 pandemic, Francis opted to return to the team in 2021 and became their number one cornerback. He also changed his jersey number to 1, as he had previously worn 32. He ended up being one of only six players to start all of Memphis' games, and recorded 36 tackles and a team-leading two interceptions.

== Professional career ==
=== Houston Texans ===
After going unselected in the 2022 NFL draft, Francis was signed by the Houston Texans as an undrafted free agent. He was released at the final roster cuts, on August 30, but was subsequently re-signed to their practice squad. He was elevated to the active roster for their Week 11 game with the Washington Commanders, and made his NFL debut in the loss, appearing on eight special teams snaps. He later received elevations for Week 12 against the Miami Dolphins, and Week 13 against the Cleveland Browns, making his first career tackle in the latter. He was signed to the active roster on December 17, 2022.

On August 29, 2023, Francis was waived by the Texans and re-signed to the practice squad. He was released on October 27.

=== Minnesota Vikings ===
On July 25, 2024, Francis signed with the Minnesota Vikings. He was waived on August 22.
