= James Earl Wright (American football) =

American gridiron football player (1939–2009)

Profile
- Position: Quarterback/Defensive back

Personal information
- Born: March 27, 1939; Columbus, Mississippi, U.S.
- Died: February 26, 2009 (aged 69)
- Listed height: 5 ft 11 in (1.80 m)
- Listed weight: 190 lb (86 kg)

Career information
- High school: Stephen D. Lee (Columbus, Mississippi)
- College: Memphis State
- NFL draft: 1961: 3rd round, 36th overall pick
- AFL draft: 1961: 14th round, 107th overall pick

Career history
- Edmonton Eskimos (1962–1963); Denver Broncos (1964)

Career NFL statistics
- Games played: 10
- Interceptions: 1
- Stats at Pro Football Reference

Career CFL statistics
- TD–INT: 1–4
- Passing yards: 89
- Passer rating: 91.3

James Earl Wright (March 27, 1939 – February 26, 2009) was an American professional football player who was a defensive back and quarterback in the American Football League (AFL) and the Canadian Football League (CFL). He played college football for the Memphis Tigers.

== Early life ==
Wright was born and grew up in Columbus, Mississippi. He attended Stephen D. Lee High School, where he lettered in baseball, football and track.

== College career ==
Wright attended Memphis State University and was the Tigers' starting quarterback for three seasons. As a senior, Time referred to Wright as "the most dangerous back in the South". Wright was leading the nation in total offense as a senior before suffering torn cartilage in his left knee against Southern Mississippi. He finished the season with 604 yards and 11 passing touchdowns. Wright was inducted into the Memphis Athletic Hall of Fame in 1979.

== Professional career ==
Wright was selected 36th overall by the Philadelphia Eagles in the third round of the 1961 NFL draft and 107th overall by the Boston Patriots in the 14th round of the 1961 AFL draft. He did not sign with either team and was later signed by the Edmonton Eskimos. Wright missed the entire 1962 season due to his knee injury. In 1963 he played in three games, completing 5 of 15 passes for 89 yards with one touchdown pass and four interceptions and rushed ten times for 33 yards. Wright's season ended when he tore ligaments in his right knee. Wright was signed by the Denver Broncos in 1964 and was moved to defensive back. He played in ten games in 1964.
