= Chris Claybrooks =

American football player (born 1998)

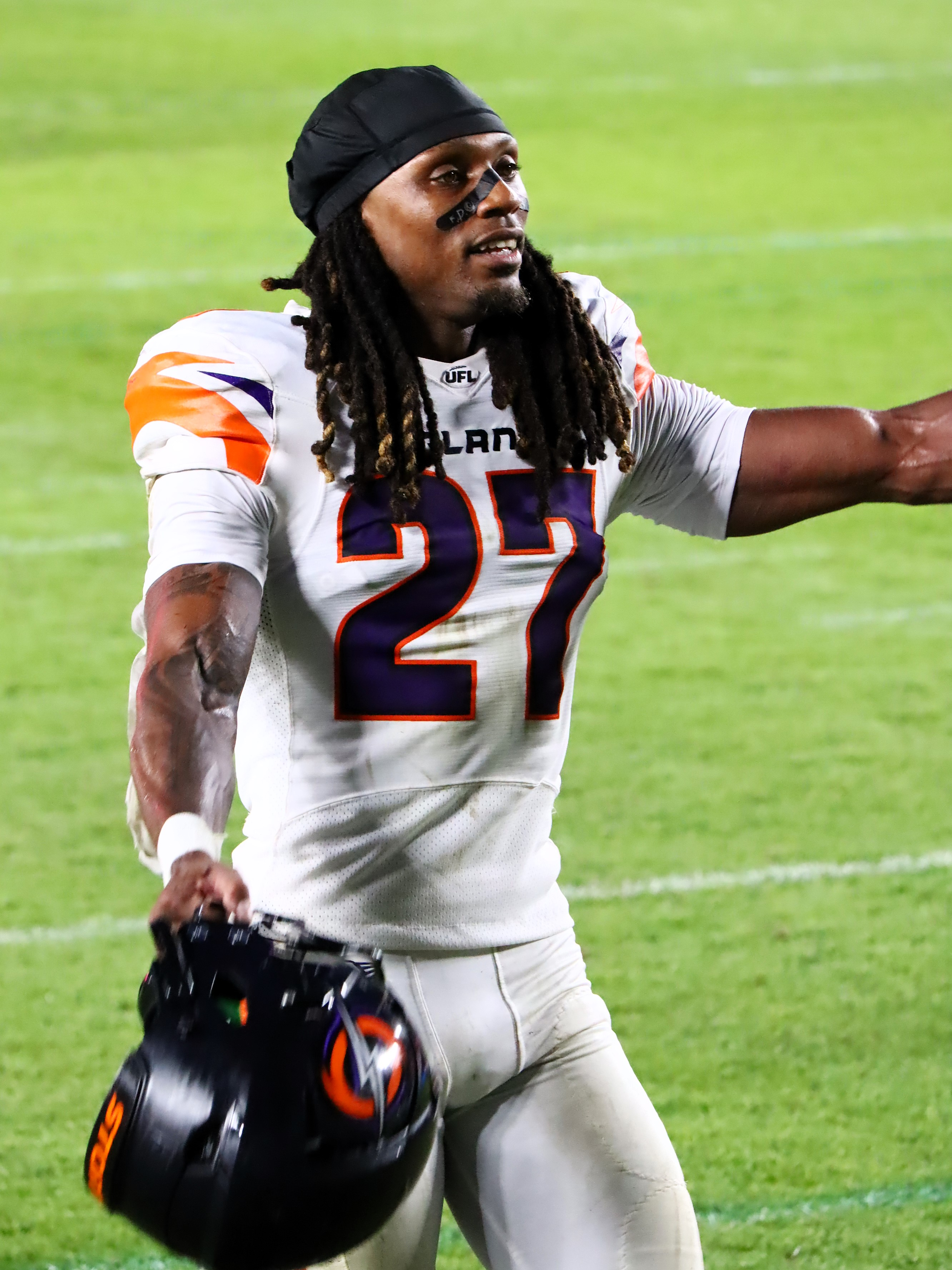
- Claybrooks with the Orlando Storm in 2026

Profile
- Position: Cornerback

Personal information
- Born: July 17, 1998 (age 28); Nashville, Tennessee, U.S.
- Listed height: 5 ft 9 in (1.75 m)
- Listed weight: 180 lb (82 kg)

Career information
- High school: McGavock (Nashville)
- College: Fort Scott CC (2016); Coahoma CC (2017); Memphis (2018–2019)
- NFL draft: 2020: 7th round, 223rd overall pick

Career history
- Jacksonville Jaguars (2020–2023); Arlington Renegades (2025); Orlando Storm (2026)

Career NFL statistics
- Total tackles: 81
- Fumble recoveries: 1
- Pass deflections: 5
- Return yards: 466
- Stats at Pro Football Reference

Chris Claybrooks (born July 17, 1998) is an American professional football cornerback. He played college football for the Fort Scott Greyhounds, Coahoma Tigers and Memphis Tigers.

== College career ==
Claybrooks played wide receiver at Coahoma Community College but switched to cornerback when he transferred to Memphis. Claybrooks missed five games in 2018 with a foot injury. In 2019, he posted 42 tackles and returned a kickoff for a touchdown. In the American Athletic Conference Championship game against the Cincinnati Bearcats, he had an interception and forced a fumble.

== Professional career ==
Pre-draft measurables
Height	Weight	Arm length	Hand span	Wingspan
5 ft 8 3/4 in (1.75 m)	177 lb (80 kg)	31 3/8 in (0.80 m)	8 3/4 in (0.22 m)	6 ft 4 5/8 in (1.95 m)
All values from Pro Day

=== Jacksonville Jaguars ===
Claybrooks was selected in the seventh round of the 2020 NFL draft by the Jacksonville Jaguars with the 223rd overall pick. He was placed on injured reserve on November 26, 2020. On December 19, 2020, Claybrooks was activated off of injured reserve.

A free agent after the 2023 season, Claybrooks was suspended eight games by the NFL on August 23, 2024, as a result of his previous arrests.

=== Arlington Renegades ===
On January 21, 2025, Claybrooks signed with the Arlington Renegades of the United Football League (UFL).

=== Orlando Storm ===
On January 13, 2026, Claybrooks was selected by the Orlando Storm in the 2026 UFL Draft. He was released on March 19. Claybrooks was re-signed by the Storm on April 28.

== Legal issues ==
On April 15, 2023, Claybrooks was arrested in Nashville, Tennessee on charges of domestic assault with bodily injury and vandalism under $1,000. The charges stemmed from an incident in which he allegedly grabbed a cell phone from a woman’s hand and damaged it by throwing it to the ground.

On July 21, 2023, Claybrooks was arrested in Jacksonville, Florida on charges of domestic violence.
