= 2023 Memphis Tigers football team =

American college football season

2023 Memphis Tigers football

Liberty Bowl champion

Liberty Bowl, W 36–26 vs. Iowa State
- Conference: American Athletic Conference
- Record: 10–3 (6–2 AAC)
- Head coach: Ryan Silverfield (4th season)
- Offensive coordinator: Tim Cramsey (2nd season)
- Offensive scheme: Pro spread
- Defensive coordinator: Matt Barnes (2nd season)
- Base defense: 4–3
- Home stadium: Simmons Bank Liberty Stadium

2023 American Athletic Conference football standings
	Conf.			Overall
Team	W		L	W		L
No. 22 SMU y$	8	–	0	11	–	3
Tulane y	8	–	0	11	–	3
UTSA	7	–	1	9	–	4
Memphis	6	–	2	10	–	3
South Florida	4	–	4	7	–	6
Rice	4	–	4	6	–	7
Navy	4	–	4	5	–	7
North Texas	3	–	5	5	–	7
UAB	3	–	5	4	–	8
Florida Atlantic	3	–	5	4	–	8
Charlotte	2	–	6	3	–	9
Tulsa	2	–	6	4	–	8
Temple	1	–	7	3	–	9
East Carolina	1	–	7	2	–	10
Championship: SMU 26, Tulane 14
$ – Conference champion; y – Championship game participant; Rankings from AP Poll

The 2023 Memphis Tigers football team represented the University of Memphis in the 2023 NCAA Division I FBS football season. The Tigers played their home games at Liberty Bowl Memorial Stadium in Memphis, Tennessee, and competed in the American Athletic Conference (The American). They were led by fourth-year head coach Ryan Silverfield. The Memphis Tigers football team drew an average home attendance of 29,782 in 2023.

== Schedule ==
Memphis and the American Athletic Conference (AAC) announced the 2023 football schedule on February 21, 2023.

Date	Time	Opponent	Site	TV	Result	Attendance
September 2	6:00 p.m.	Bethune-Cookman*	Simmons Bank Liberty Stadium; Memphis, TN	ESPN+	W 56–14	26,632
September 9	6:00 p.m.	at Arkansas State*	Centennial Bank Stadium; Jonesboro, AR (Paint Bucket Bowl)	ESPN+	W 37–3	18,724
September 14	6:30 p.m.	Navy	Simmons Bank Liberty Stadium; Memphis, TN	ESPN	W 28–24	25,551
September 23	6:30 p.m.	vs. Missouri*	The Dome at America's Center; St. Louis, MO	ESPNU	L 27–34	45,085
September 30	4:00 p.m.	Boise State*	Simmons Bank Liberty Stadium; Memphis, TN	ESPN2	W 35–32	30,364
October 13	6:00 p.m.	Tulane	Simmons Bank Liberty Stadium; Memphis, TN	ESPN	L 21–31	35,609
October 21	11:00 a.m.	at UAB	Protective Stadium; Birmingham, AL	ESPN2	W 45–21	20,269
October 28	2:00 p.m.	at North Texas	DATCU Stadium; Denton, TX	ESPN+	W 45–42	18,062
November 4	2:00 p.m.	South Florida	Simmons Bank Liberty Stadium; Memphis, TN	ESPN+	W 59–50	30,223
November 11	2:00 p.m.	at Charlotte	Jerry Richardson Stadium; Charlotte, NC	ESPN+	W 44–38 ^{OT}	8,895
November 18	11:00 a.m.	SMU	Simmons Bank Liberty Stadium; Memphis, TN	ESPN2	L 34–38	30,313
November 24	11:00 a.m.	at Temple	Lincoln Financial Field; Philadelphia, PA	ESPN	W 45–21	10,830
December 29	2:30 p.m.	Iowa State*	Simmons Bank Liberty Stadium; Memphis, TN (AutoZone Liberty Bowl)	ESPN	W 36–26	48,789
*Non-conference game; Rankings from AP Poll and CFP Rankings released prior to game; All times are in Eastern time

== Game summaries ==
=== vs Bethune–Cookman (FCS) ===
Bethune–Cookman Wildcats (FCS) (0–0) vs Memphis Tigers (0–0) – Game summary

Quarter	1	2	3	4	Total
Wildcats (FCS)	7	0	0	7	14
Tigers	10	18	21	7	56

at Simmons Bank Liberty Stadium • Memphis, Tennessee

- Date: September 2
- Game time: 6:00 p.m. CDT
- Game weather: Sunny • Temperature: 81 °F (27 °C) • Wind: SE at 10 miles per hour (16 km/h)
- Game attendance: 26,632
- Referee: Nate Black
- TV announcers (ESPN+): Tony Simeone (play-by-play), Doc Holliday (analyst)

Game information

First quarter

- (12:28) MEM – Blake Watson 2 yard run, Seth Morgan kick (Drive: 6 plays, 73 yards, 2:30; Memphis 7–0)
- (5:07) MEM – Seth Morgan 45 yard field goal (Drive: 10 plays, 23 yards, 4:02; Memphis 10–0)
- (2:15) BCU – Amarie Jones 69 yard interception return, Cade Hechter kick (Memphis 10–7)

Second quarter

- (13:08) MEM – Blake Watson 15 yard run, Seth Morgan kick (Drive: 9 plays, 70 yards, 4:07; Memphis 17–7)
- (9:13) MEM – Seth Morgan 26 yard field goal (Drive: 7 plays, 11 yards, 2:23; Memphis 20–7)
- (6:26) MEM – Blake Watson 2 yard run, 2-point pass (Drive: 4 plays, 31 yards, 1:39; Memphis 28–7)

Third quarter

- (10:59) MEM – Sutton Smith 4 yard run, Seth Morgan kick (Drive: 5 plays, 45 yards, 2:04; Memphis 35–7)
- (6:27) MEM – DeMeer Blankumsee 47 yard pass from Seth Henigan, Seth Morgan kick (Drive: 4 plays, 78 yards, 1:51; Memphis 42–7)
- (3:23) MEM – Christian Carter 7 yard pass from Seth Henigan, Seth Morgan kick (Drive: 4 plays, 67 yards, 1:56; Memphis 49–7)

Fourth quarter

- (12:37) MEM – Sutton Smith 3 yard run, Seth Morgan kick (Drive: 9 plays, 41 yards, 4:21; Memphis 56–7)
- (1:25) BCU – Ejike Brown 19 yard fumble return, Cade Hechter kick (Memphis 56–14)

Statistics	Bethune–Cookman (FCS)	Memphis
First downs	4	27
Plays–yards	48–91	81–551
Rushes–yards	24–52	43–208
Passing yards	39	343
Passing: comp–att–int	13–24–0	28–38–2
Time of possession	23:17	36:43

Team	Category	Player	Statistics
Bethune–Cookman (FCS)	Passing	Luke Sprague	3/6, 21 yards
Bethune–Cookman (FCS)	Rushing	Jaiden Bivens	1 carry, 24 yards
Bethune–Cookman (FCS)	Receiving	Omari Stewart	1 reception, 20 yards
Memphis	Passing	Seth Henigan	27/36, 334 yards, 2 TD, 2 INT
Memphis	Rushing	Sutton Smith	18 carries, 115 yards, 2 TD
Memphis	Receiving	DeMeer Blankumsee	6 receptions, 98 yards, 1 TD

=== at Arkansas State ===
Memphis Tigers (1–0) vs Arkansas State Red Wolves (0–1) – Game summary

Quarter	1	2	3	4	Total
Tigers	3	21	7	6	37
Red Wolves	0	3	0	0	3

at Centennial Bank Stadium • Jonesboro, Arkansas

- Date: September 9
- Game time: 6:00 p.m. CDT
- Game weather: Sunny • Temperature: 79 °F (26 °C) • Wind: NE at 10 miles per hour (16 km/h)
- Game attendance: 18,724
- Referee: Scott Hardin
- TV announcers (ESPN+): Roger Twibell (play-by-play), Pete Cordelli (analyst), Darrell Greene (sideline reporter)

Game information

First quarter

- (5:53) MEM – Seth Morgan 47 yard field goal (Drive: 13 plays, 53 yards, 5:27; Memphis 3–0)

Second quarter

- (8:20) MEM – Joe Scates 4 yard pass from Seth Henigan, Seth Morgan kick (Drive: 9 plays, 44 yards, 5:05; Memphis 10–0)
- (7:34) MEM – DJ Bell 36 yard interception return, Seth Morgan kick (Memphis 17–0)
- (3:34) MEM – Tauskie Dove 52 yard pass from Seth Henigan, Seth Morgan kick (Drive: 4 plays, 72 yards, 1:38; Memphis 24–0)
- (0:04) ARST – Dominic Zvada 34 yard field goal (Drive: 14 plays, 58 yards, 3:30; Memphis 24–3)

Third quarter

- (8:51) MEM – Seth Henigan 7 yard run, Seth Morgan kick (Drive: 10 plays, 54 yards, 4:31; Memphis 31–3)

Fourth quarter

- (0:00) MEM – Ke’Travion Hargrove 17 yard run (Drive: 4 plays, 24 yards, 2:22; Memphis 37–3)

Statistics	Memphis	Arkansas State
First downs	18	18
Plays–yards	70–389	71–230
Rushes–yards	41–150	30–64
Passing yards	239	166
Passing: comp–att–int	21–29–0	22–41–2
Time of possession	35:32	24:28

Team	Category	Player	Statistics
Memphis	Passing	Seth Henigan	21/29, 239 yards, 2 TD
Memphis	Rushing	Blake Watson	20 carries, 51 yards
Memphis	Receiving	Tauskie Dove	1 reception, 52 yards, 1 TD
Arkansas State	Passing	J. T. Shrout	12/25, 79 yards, 2 INT
Arkansas State	Rushing	Ja'Quez Cross	9 carries, 57 yards
Arkansas State	Receiving	Corey Rucker	3 receptions, 40 yards

=== vs Navy ===
Navy Midshipmen (1–1) vs Memphis Tigers (2–0) – Game summary

Quarter	1	2	3	4	Total
Midshipmen	14	0	7	3	24
Tigers	7	7	7	7	28

at Simmons Bank Liberty Stadium • Memphis, Tennessee

- Date: September 14
- Game time: 6:30 p.m. CDT
- Game weather: Sunny • Temperature: 77 °F (25 °C) • Wind: W at 5 miles per hour (8.0 km/h)
- Game attendance: 25,551
- Referee: Kevin Randall
- TV announcers (ESPN): Matt Barrie (play-by-play), Dan Mullen (analyst), Harry Lyles Jr. (sideline reporter)

Game information

First quarter

- (5:15) MEM – Blake Watson 7 yard run, Seth Morgan kick (Drive: 13 plays, 90 yards, 5:23; Memphis 7–0)
- (5:03) NAVY – Alex Tecza 75 yard run, Evan Warren kick (Drive: 1 play, 75 yards, 0:12; Tied 7–7)
- (1:14) NAVY – Regis Velez 16 yard pass from Tai Lavatai, Evan Warren kick (Drive: 6 plays, 77 yards, 2:50; Navy 14–7)

Second quarter

- (0:23) MEM – Roc Taylor 7 yard pass from Seth Henigan, Seth Morgan kick (Drive: 8 plays, 56 yards, 0:56; Tied 14–14)

Third quarter

- (12:24) MEM – Seth Henigan 1 yard run, Seth Morgan kick (Drive: 7 plays, 47 yards, 2:36; Memphis 21–14)
- (9:08) NAVY – Anton Hall 2 yard run, Evan Warren kick (Drive: 6 plays, 85 yards, 3:12; Tied 21–21)

Fourth quarter

- (14:22) MEM – Seth Henigan 3 yard run, Seth Morgan kick (Drive: 3 plays, 78 yards, 0:58; Memphis 28–21)
- (7:09) NAVY – Nathan Kirkwood 36 yard field goal (Drive: 7 plays, 27 yards, 3:38; Memphis 28–24)

Statistics	Navy	Memphis
First downs	19	19
Plays–yards	70–432	66–408
Rushes–yards	50–299	31–190
Passing yards	133	218
Passing: comp–att–int	10–20–0	23–35–1
Time of possession	32:49	27:11

Team	Category	Player	Statistics
Navy	Passing	Tai Lavatai	10/19, 133 yards, 1 TD
Navy	Rushing	Alex Tecza	15 carries, 163 yards, 1 TD
Navy	Receiving	Brandon Chatman	1 reception, 58 yards
Memphis	Passing	Seth Henigan	23/35, 218 yards, 1 TD, 1 INT
Memphis	Rushing	Blake Watson	10 carries, 169 yards, 1 TD
Memphis	Receiving	Blake Watson	6 receptions, 68 yards

=== vs Missouri ===
Memphis Tigers (3–0) vs Missouri Tigers (3–0) – Game summary

Quarter	1	2	3	4	Total
Memphis Tigers	10	0	7	10	27
Missouri Tigers	7	10	7	10	34

at The Dome at America's Center • St. Louis, Missouri

- Date: September 23
- Game time: 6:30 p.m. CDT
- Game weather: No weather (indoor stadium)
- Game attendance: 45,085
- Referee: Ken Williams
- TV announcers (ESPNU): Courtney Lyle (play-by-play), Hutson Mason (analyst)

Game information

First quarter

- (9:37) MIZ – Marquis Johnson 76 yard pass from Brady Cook, Harrison Mevis kick (Drive: 3 plays, 91 yards, 1:13; Missouri 7–0)
- (4:18) MEM – Tanner Gillis 43 yard field goal (Drive: 12 plays, 50 yards, 5:19; Missouri 7–3)
- (2:15) MEM – Joe Scates 3 yard pass from Seth Henigan, Tanner Gillis kick (Drive: 4 plays, 10 yards, 1:06; Memphis 10–7)

Second quarter

- (6:27) MIZ – Nathaniel Peat 1 yard run, Harrison Mevis kick (Drive: 9 plays, 75 yards, 5:14; Missouri 14–10)
- (0:05) MIZ – Harrison Mevis 25 yard field goal (Drive: 10 plays, 78 yards, 3:27; Missouri 17–10)

Third quarter

- (9:19) MIZ – Theo Wease 19 yard pass from Brady Cook, Harrison Mevis kick (Drive: 3 plays, 76 yards, 1:17; Missouri 24–10)
- (4:07) MEM – Blake Watson 13 yard pass from Seth Henigan, Tanner Gillis kick (Drive: 6 plays, 69 yards, 2:47; Missouri 24–17)

Fourth quarter

- (11:01) MIZ – Harrison Mevis 32 yard field goal (Drive: 9 plays, 74 yards, 3:53; Missouri 27–17)
- (5:18) MEM – Tanner Gillis 22 yard field goal (Drive: 12 plays, 72 yards, 5:43; Missouri 27–20)
- (2:46) MIZ – Cody Schrader 37 yard run, Harrison Mevis kick (Drive: 5 plays, 75 yards, 2:32; Missouri 34–20)
- (1:21) MEM – Koby Drake 21 yard pass from Seth Henigan, Tanner Gillis kick (Drive: 8 plays, 75 yards, 1:25; Missouri 34–27)

Statistics	Memphis	Missouri
First downs	21	22
Plays–yards	76–399	61–542
Rushes–yards	29–83	36–201
Passing yards	316	341
Passing: comp–att–int	31–47–2	18–25–0
Time of possession	32:40	27:20

Team	Category	Player	Statistics
Memphis	Passing	Seth Henigan	31/47, 316 yards, 3 TD, 2 INT
Memphis	Rushing	Blake Watson	18 carries, 47 yards
Memphis	Receiving	Roc Taylor	7 receptions, 143 yards
Missouri	Passing	Brady Cook	18/25, 341 yards, 2 TD
Missouri	Rushing	Cody Schrader	14 carries, 123 yards, 1 TD
Missouri	Receiving	Luther Burden III	10 receptions, 177 yards

=== vs Boise State ===
Boise State Broncos (2–2) vs Memphis Tigers (3–1) – Game summary

Quarter	1	2	3	4	Total
Broncos	3	14	0	15	32
Tigers	0	14	7	14	35

at Simmons Bank Liberty Stadium • Memphis, Tennessee

- Date: September 30
- Game time: 3:00 p.m. CDT
- Game weather: Sunny • Temperature: 92 °F (33 °C) • Wind: NE at 5 miles per hour (8.0 km/h)
- Game attendance: 30,364
- Referee: Tim Rich
- TV announcers (ESPN2): Beth Mowins (play-by-play), Kirk Morrison (analyst), Stormy Buonantony (sideline reporter)

Game information

First quarter

- (6:09) BSU – Jonah Dalmas 19-yard field goal (Drive: 10 plays, 35 yards, 4:16; Boise State 3–0)

Second quarter

- (11:41) BSU – Ashton Jeanty 8-yard run, Jonah Dalmas kick (Drive: 4 plays, 82 yards, 1:56; Boise State 10–0)
- (6:17) BSU – Ashton Jeanty 1-yard run, Jonah Dalmas kick (Drive: 7 plays, 61 yards, 3:16; Boise State 17–0)
- (5:00) MEM – Roc Taylor 19-yard pass from Seth Henigan, Tanner Gillis kick (Drive: 4 plays, 75 yards, 1:17; Boise State 17–7)
- (0:27) MEM – Blake Watson 5-yard run, Tanner Gillis kick (Drive: 8 plays, 66 yards, 2:28; Boise State 17–14)

Third quarter

- (1:43) MEM – Geoffrey Cantin-Arku 80-yard blocked field goal return, Tanner Gillis kick (Memphis 21–17)

Fourth quarter

- (11:16) MEM – DeMeer Blankumsee 59-yard pass from Seth Henigan, Tanner Gillis kick (Drive: 5 plays, 88 yards, 1:52; Memphis 28–17)
- (8:54) BSU – Ashton Jeanty 15-yard pass from Maddux Madsen, Stefan Cobbs pass (Drive: 5 plays, 80 yards, 2:16; Memphis 28–25)
- (2:16) MEM – Blake Watson 1-yard run, Tanner Gillis kick (Drive: 13 plays, 75 yards, 6:38; Memphis 35–25)
- (0:39) BSU – Ashton Jeanty 7-yard pass from Maddux Madsen, Jonah Dalmas kick (Drive: 7 plays, 75 yards, 1:37; Memphis 35–32)

Statistics	Boise State	Memphis
First downs	24	20
Plays–yards	70–519	63–448
Rushes–yards	32–144	35–179
Passing yards	375	269
Passing: comp–att–int	23–38–0	18–28–0
Time of possession	32:49	27:11

Team	Category	Player	Statistics
Boise State	Passing	Taylen Green	12/24, 200 yards
Boise State	Rushing	Ashton Jeanty	23 carries, 82 yards, 2 TD
Boise State	Receiving	Eric McAlister	5 receptions, 98 yards
Memphis	Passing	Seth Henigan	18/28, 269 yards, 2 TD
Memphis	Rushing	Blake Watson	19 carries, 113 yards, 2 TD
Memphis	Receiving	Roc Taylor	5 receptions, 102 yards, TD

=== vs Tulane ===
Tulane Green Wave (4–1) at Memphis Tigers (4–1) – Game summary

Quarter	1	2	3	4	Total
Green Wave	7	3	7	14	31
Tigers	0	14	7	0	21

at Simmons Bank Liberty Stadium, Memphis, TN

- Date: October 13, 2023
- Game time: 6:00 p.m. CDT
- Game weather: Cloudy • Temperature: 73 °F (23 °C) • Wind: S 8 mph
- Game attendance: 35,609
- Referee: Kevin Randall
- TV announcers (ESPN): Anish Shroff (play-by-play), Andre Ware (color), Paul Carcaterra (sideline)

Game information

First Quarter

- (4:06) TUL – Makhi Hughes 2-yard run, Valentino Ambrosio kick (Drive: 9 plays, 72 yards, 3:46; Tulane 7–0)

Second Quarter

- (8:11) TUL – Valentino Ambrosio 26-yard field goal (Drive: 14 plays, 51 yards, 6:30; Tulane 10–0)
- (5:15) MEM – Demeer Blankumsee 17-yard pass from Seth Henigan, Tanner Gillis kick (Drive: 8 plays, 89 yards, 2:56; Tulane 10–7)
- (0:45) MEM – Joseph Scates 28-yard pass from Seth Henigan, Tanner Gillis kick (Drive: 8 plays, 77 yards, 1:51; Memphis 14–10)

Third Quarter

- (10:09) MEM – Koby Drake 10-yard pass from Seth Henigan, Tanner Gillis kick (Drive: 9 plays, 75 yards, 4:51; Memphis 21–10)
- (4:32) TUL – Michael Pratt 1-yard run, Valentino Ambrosio kick (Drive: 10 plays, 55 yards, 5:37; Memphis 21–17)

Fourth Quarter

- (14:55) TUL – Yulkeith Brown 9-yard run, Valentino Ambrosio kick (Drive: 5 plays, 69 yards, 2:34; Tulane 24–21)
- (11:46) TUL – Lawrence Keys III 11-yard pass from Michael Pratt, Valentino Ambrosio kick (Drive: 4 plays, 52 yards, 1:52; Tulane 31–21)

Win Probability

- Tulane 54.4%

Line

- Tulane –5.0

Over/Under

- 55

Statistics	TUL	MEM
First downs	20	20
Total yards	403	366
Rushing yards	144	45
Passing yards	259	321
Turnovers	0	2
Time of possession	36:58	23:02

Team	Category	Player	Statistics
Tulane	Passing	Michael Pratt	19/31, 259 yards, 1 TD
Tulane	Rushing	Makhi Hughes	26 carries, 130 yards, 1 TD
Tulane	Receiving	Chris Brazzell II	3 receptions, 103 yards
Memphis	Passing	Seth Henigan	24/43, 321 yards, 3 TD, 2 INT
Memphis	Rushing	Sutton Smith	4 carries, 22 yards
Memphis	Receiving	Demeer Blankumsee	6 receptions, 108 yards

=== vs SMU ===
SMU Mustangs (8–2) at Memphis Tigers (8–2) – Game summary

Quarter	1	2	3	4	Total
Mustangs	7	7	14	10	38
Tigers	10	3	8	13	34

at Simmons Bank Liberty Stadium, Memphis, Tennessee

- Date: November 18
- Game time: 11:00 a.m. CST
- Game weather: Sunny, 55 °F (13 °C)
- Game attendance: 30,313
- Referee: Luke Richmond
- TV announcers (ESPN2): Beth Mowins, Kirk Morrison, and Stormy Buonantony

Game information
First quarter
- SMU – R. J. Maryland 43-yard pass from Preston Stone (Collin Rogers kick), 12:16. Mustangs 7–0. Drive: 4 plays, 48 yards, 1:24.
- MEM – Tanner Gillis 47-yard field goal, 7:25. Mustangs 7–3. Drive: 11 plays, 46 yards, 4:51.
- MEM – Demeer Blankumsee 27-yard pass from Seth Henigan (Tanner Gillis kick), 0:56. Memphis 10–7. Drive: 10 plays, 80 yards, 5:19.

Second quarter

- SMU – Preston Stone 1-yard run (Collin Rogers kick), 6:07. Mustangs 14–10. Drive: 13 plays, 70 yards, 6:04.
- MEM – Tanner Gillis 36-yard field goal, 0:46. Mustangs 14–13. Drive: 12 plays, 70 yards, 5:15.

Third quarter

- SMU – L. J. Johnson Jr. 1-yard run (Collin Rogers kick), 9:35. Mustangs 21–13. Drive: 13 plays, 80 yards, 5:21.
- MEM – Brandon Thomas 1-yard run (Seth Henigan pass to Anthony Landphere), 4:27. Tied 21–21. Drive: 10 plays, 75 yards, 5:08.
- SMU – Jaylan Knighton 1-yard run (Collin Rogers kick), 3:17. Mustangs 28–21. Drive: 4 plays, 75 yards, 1:10.

Fourth quarter

- MEM – Blake Watson 11-yard run (Tanner Gillis kick), 14:55. Tied 28–28. Drive: 8 plays, 75 yards, 3:22.
- SMU – Collin Rogers 32-yard field goal, 12:25. Mustangs 31–28. Drive: 6 plays, 60 yards, 2:30.
- SMU – Jordan Hudson 7-yard pass from Preston Stone (Collin Rogers kick), 2:41. Mustangs 38–28. Drive: 9 plays, 73 yards, 4:53.
- MEM – Demeer Blankumsee 20-yard pass from Seth Henigan (kick failed), 0:53. Mustangs 38–34. Drive: 10 plays, 70 yards, 1:44.

Statistics	SMU	MEM
First downs	23	24
Total yards	444	464
Rushing yards	158	62
Passing yards	286	402
Turnovers	0	1
Time of possession	28:10	31:50

Team	Category	Player	Statistics
SMU	Passing	Preston Stone	15/23, 286 yards, 2 TD
SMU	Rushing	L. J. Johnson Jr.	21 rushes, 115 yards, TD
SMU	Receiving	Keyshawn Smith	3 receptions, 63 yards
Memphis	Passing	Seth Henigan	35/51, 402 yards, 2 TD
Memphis	Rushing	Blake Watson	10 rushes, 41 yards, TD
Memphis	Receiving	Roc Taylor	8 receptions, 146 yards

=== vs Iowa State (Liberty Bowl) ===
2023 AutoZone Liberty Bowl
Iowa State Cyclones (7-5, 6-3) vs Memphis Tigers (9-3, 6-2) – Game summary

Quarter	1	2	3	4	Total
Cyclones	19	3	14	0	36
Tigers	0	13	7	6	26

at Simmons Bank Memorial Stadium • Memphis, Tennessee

- Date: Friday, December 29th, 2023
- Game time: 3:30 pm EST/2:30 pm CST/12:30 pm PST
- Game weather: Cloudy • Temperature: 38 °F (3 °C) • Wind: 8 mph (13 km/h) W
- Game attendance: 48,789
- Referee: Matt Loeffler
- TV announcers (ESPN): John Schriffen (play-by-play), Rocky Boiman (analyst), and Dawn Davenport (sideline)
- Box score

Game information

First Quarter

- (13:41) MEM – Demeer Blankumsee 70 yard pass from Seth Henigan, Tanner Gillis kick no good (Drive: 3 plays, 75 yards, 1:19; Memphis 6–0)
- (5:53) MEM – Seth Henigan 11 yard run, Tanner Gillis kick (Drive: 9 plays, 46 yards, 5:00; Memphis 13–0)
- (0:30) MEM – Joseph Scates 51 yard pass from Seth Henigan, two-point pass conversion failed (Drive: 4 plays, 84 yards, 2:15; Memphis 19–0)

Second Quarter

- (11:25) ISU – Jayden Higgins 29 yard pass from Rocco Becht, Chase Contreraz kick (Drive: 7 plays, 75 yards, 4:05; Memphis 19–7)
- (6:19) ISU – Chase Contreraz 22 yard field goal (Drive: 7 plays, 67 yards, 4:03; Memphis 19–10)
- (0:35) ISU – Chase Contreraz 39 yard field goal (Drive: 8 plays, 42 yards, 1:09; Memphis 19–13)
- (0:00) MEM – Tanner Gillis 49 yard field goal (Drive: 4 plays, 44 yards, 0:35; Memphis 22–13)

Third Quarter

- (11:38) MEM – Anthony Landphere 5 yard pass from Seth Henigan, Tanner Gillis kick (Drive: 4 plays, 65 yards, 2:14; Memphis 29–13)
- (7:59) MEM – Sutton Smith 48 yard pass from Seth Henigan, Tanner Gillis kick (Drive: 3 plays, 50 yards, 1:01; Memphis 36–13)
- (4:01) ISU – Easton Dean 15 yard pass from Rocco Becht, Chase Contreraz kick Drive: 7 plays, 85 yards, 3:58; Memphis 36–20)

Fourth Quarter

- (9:55) ISU – Jaylin Noel 23 yard pass from Rocco Becht, two-point pass conversion failed (Drive: 6 plays, 80 yards, 1:57; Memphis 36–26)

Statistics	Iowa State	Memphis
First downs	22	19
Total yards	530	446
Rushes/yards	32–166	20–0
Passing yards	364	446
Passing: Comp–Att–Int	24–34–0	22–40–0
Turnovers	0	0
Time of possession	34:24	25:36

Team	Category	Player	Statistics
Iowa State	Passing	Rocco Becht	22/38, 446 yards, 3 TD
Iowa State	Rushing	Abu Sama III	12 carries, 4 yards
Iowa State	Receiving	Jayden Higgins	9 receptions, 214 yards, TD
Memphis	Passing	Seth Henigan	24/34, 364 yards, 4 TD
Memphis	Rushing	Blake Watson	15 carries, 107 yards
Memphis	Receiving	Roc Taylor	8 receptions, 102 yards
