= 2023 Liberty Bowl =

Postseason college football bowl game

2023 AutoZone Liberty Bowl
- 65th Liberty Bowl
Memphis Tigers	Iowa State Cyclones
(9–3)	(7–5)
The American	Big 12
36	26
Head coach: Ryan Silverfield	Head coach: Matt Campbell
	1	2	3	4	Total
Memphis	19	3	14	0	36
Iowa State	0	13	7	6	26
- Date: December 29, 2023
- Season: 2023
- Stadium: Simmons Bank Liberty Stadium
- Location: Memphis, Tennessee
- MVP: Seth Henigan (QB, Memphis)
- Favorite: Iowa State by 10.5
- Referee: Matt Loeffler (SEC)
- Attendance: 48,789

United States TV coverage
- Network: ESPN; ESPN Radio
- Announcers: John Schriffen (play-by-play), Rocky Boiman (analyst), and Dawn Davenport (sideline) (ESPN); Jorge Sedano (play-by-play) and Orlando Franklin (analyst) (ESPN Radio)

The 2023 Liberty Bowl was a college football bowl game played on December 29, 2023, at Simmons Bank Liberty Stadium in Memphis, Tennessee. The 65th annual Liberty Bowl featured Iowa State from the Big 12 Conference and Memphis from the American Athletic Conference (The American). The game began at approximately 2:30 p.m. CST and was aired on ESPN. The Liberty Bowl was one of the 2023–24 bowl games concluding the 2023 FBS football season. The game was sponsored by automotive retailer AutoZone and was officially known as the AutoZone Liberty Bowl.

== Teams ==
The bowl featured the Iowa State Cyclones of the Big 12 Conference and Memphis Tigers of the American Athletic Conference (The American). While the Liberty Bowl has a tie-in with the Southeastern Conference (SEC), the SEC did not have enough bowl-eligible members to supply a team.

This was the second meeting between Iowa State and Memphis; the teams previously met in the 2017 Liberty Bowl, won by Iowa State, 21–20.

While Iowa State was the designated home team for the game, it was a de facto home game for Memphis, as Simmons Bank Liberty Stadium, the site of the Liberty Bowl, is also the Tigers' home field.

=== Iowa State Cyclones ===
The Cyclones entered the game with a 7–5 record (6–3 in the Big 12), tied for fourth place in their conference.

This was Iowa State's fourth Liberty Bowl; the Cyclones were 1–2 in prior editions of the game, their sole win coming in the aforementioned 2017 game, along with losses in the 1972 edition and 2012 edition.

=== Memphis Tigers ===
The Tigers entered the game with a 9–3 record (6–2 in the American), having finished in fourth place in their conference.

This was Memphis' second Liberty Bowl, after the aforementioned 2017 game.

== Game summary ==
2023 AutoZone Liberty Bowl

Quarter	1	2	3	4	Total
Memphis	19	3	14	0	36
Iowa State	0	13	7	6	26

at Simmons Bank Liberty Stadium • Memphis, Tennessee

- Date: Friday, December 29, 2023
- Game time: 2:30 p.m. CST
- Game weather: Cloudy • Temperature: 38 °F (3 °C) • Wind: 8 mph (13 km/h) W
- Game attendance: 48,789
- Referee: Matt Loeffler
- TV announcers (ESPN): John Schriffen (play-by-play), Rocky Boiman (analyst), and Dawn Davenport (sideline)
- Box score

Game information

First Quarter

- (13:41) MEM – Demeer Blankumsee 70 yard pass from Seth Henigan, Tanner Gillis kick no good (Drive: 3 plays, 75 yards, 1:19; Memphis 6–0)
- (5:53) MEM – Seth Henigan 11 yard run, Tanner Gillis kick (Drive: 9 plays, 46 yards, 5:00; Memphis 13–0)
- (0:30) MEM – Joseph Scates 51 yard pass from Seth Henigan, two-point pass conversion failed (Drive: 4 plays, 84 yards, 2:15; Memphis 19–0)

Second Quarter

- (11:25) ISU – Jayden Higgins 29 yard pass from Rocco Becht, Chase Contreraz kick (Drive: 7 plays, 75 yards, 4:05; Memphis 19–7)
- (6:19) ISU – Chase Contreraz 22 yard field goal (Drive: 7 plays, 67 yards, 4:03; Memphis 19–10)
- (0:35) ISU – Chase Contreraz 39 yard field goal (Drive: 8 plays, 42 yards, 1:09; Memphis 19–13)
- (0:00) MEM – Tanner Gillis 49 yard field goal (Drive: 4 plays, 44 yards, 0:35; Memphis 22–13)

Third Quarter

- (11:38) MEM – Anthony Landphere 5 yard pass from Seth Henigan, Tanner Gillis kick (Drive: 4 plays, 65 yards, 2:14; Memphis 29–13)
- (7:59) MEM – Sutton Smith 48 yard pass from Seth Henigan, Tanner Gillis kick (Drive: 3 plays, 50 yards, 1:01; Memphis 36–13)
- (4:01) ISU – Easton Dean 15 yard pass from Rocco Becht, Chase Contreraz kick Drive: 7 plays, 85 yards, 3:58; Memphis 36–20)

Fourth Quarter

- (9:55) ISU – Jaylin Noel 23 yard pass from Rocco Becht, two-point pass conversion failed (Drive: 6 plays, 80 yards, 1:57; Memphis 36–26)

=== Statistics ===
Statistics	MEM	ISU
First downs	22	19
Plays–yards	66–530	60–446
Rushes–yards	32–166	20–0
Passing yards	364	446
Passing: comp–att–int	24–34–0	22–40–0
Time of possession	34:24	25:36

Team	Category	Player	Statistics
Memphis	Passing	Seth Henigan	24/34, 364 yards, 4 TD
Memphis	Rushing	Blake Watson	15 carries, 107 yards
Memphis	Receiving	Roc Taylor	8 receptions, 102 yards
Iowa State	Passing	Rocco Becht	22/38, 446 yards, 3 TD
Iowa State	Rushing	Abu Sama III	12 carries, 4 yards
Iowa State	Receiving	Jayden Higgins	9 receptions, 214 yards, TD
