= 2023 Iowa State Cyclones football team =

American college football season

2023 Iowa State Cyclones football

Liberty Bowl, L 26–36 vs. Memphis
- Conference: Big 12 Conference
- Record: 7–6 (6–3 Big 12)
- Head coach: Matt Campbell (8th season)
- Offensive coordinator: Nathan Scheelhaase (1st season)
- Offensive scheme: Multiple
- Defensive coordinator: Jon Heacock (8th season)
- Base defense: 3-high safety
- Captains: Easton Dean; Ben Nikkel; Gerry Vaughn; Jaylin Noel; Beau Freyler
- Home stadium: Jack Trice Stadium

2023 Big 12 Conference football standings
	Conf.			Overall
Team	W		L	W		L
No. 3 Texas y$^	8	–	1	12	–	2
No. 16 Oklahoma State y	7	–	2	10	–	4
No. 15 Oklahoma	7	–	2	10	–	3
Iowa State	6	–	3	7	–	6
No. 18 Kansas State	6	–	3	9	–	4
West Virginia	6	–	3	9	–	4
Texas Tech	5	–	4	7	–	6
No. 23 Kansas	5	–	4	9	–	4
UCF	3	–	6	6	–	7
TCU	3	–	6	5	–	7
Houston	2	–	7	4	–	8
BYU	2	–	7	5	–	7
Baylor	2	–	7	3	–	9
Cincinnati	1	–	8	3	–	9
Championship: Texas 49, Oklahoma State 21
^ – College Football Playoff participant; $ – Conference champion; y – Championship game participant; Rankings from AP Poll

The 2023 Iowa State Cyclones football team represented Iowa State University as a member of Big 12 Conference during the 2023 NCAA Division I FBS football season. Led by eighth-year head coach Matt Campbell, the Cyclones compiled an overall record of 7–6 with a mark of 6–3 in conference play, placing in a three-way tie for fourth in the Big 12. Iowa State was invited to the Liberty Bowl, where the Cyclones lost to Memphis. The team played home games at Jack Trice Stadium in Ames, Iowa.

== Schedule ==
Date	Time	Opponent	Site	TV	Result	Attendance
September 2	1:00 p.m.	No. 23 (FCS) Northern Iowa*	Jack Trice Stadium; Ames, IA	ESPN+	W 30–9	58,248
September 9	2:30 p.m.	Iowa*	Jack Trice Stadium; Ames, IA (rivalry)	FOX	L 13–20	61,500
September 16	11:00 a.m.	at Ohio*	Peden Stadium; Athens, OH	ESPNU	L 7–10	21,991
September 23	3:00 p.m.	Oklahoma State	Jack Trice Stadium; Ames, IA	FS1	W 34–27	59,022
September 30	6:00 p.m.	at No. 14 Oklahoma	Gaylord Family Oklahoma Memorial Stadium; Norman, OK	FS1	L 20–50	84,371
October 7	7:00 p.m.	TCU	Jack Trice Stadium; Ames, IA	FS1	W 27–14	60,535
October 14	11:00 a.m.	at Cincinnati	Nippert Stadium; Cincinnati, OH	FS1	W 30–10	38,193
October 28	2:30 p.m.	at Baylor	McLane Stadium; Waco, TX	ESPN+	W 30–18	43,528
November 4	6:00 p.m.	No. 21 Kansas^{†}	Jack Trice Stadium; Ames, IA	ESPN	L 21–28	61,500
November 11	9:15 p.m.	at BYU	LaVell Edwards Stadium; Provo, UT	ESPN	W 45–13	60,754
November 18	7:00 p.m.	No. 7 Texas	Jack Trice Stadium; Ames, IA	FOX	L 16–26	61,500
November 25	7:00 p.m.	at No. 19 Kansas State	Bill Snyder Family Football Stadium; Manhattan, KS (rivalry)	FOX	W 42–35	51,481
December 29	2:30 p.m.	at Memphis*	Simmons Bank Liberty Stadium; Memphis, TN (Liberty Bowl)	ESPN	L 26–36	48,789
*Non-conference game; ^{†}Homecoming; Rankings from AP Poll (and CFP Rankings, after October 31) - Released prior to game; All times are in Central time

== Game summaries ==
=== Vs. Northern Iowa ===
Northern Iowa Panthers (0–0) vs. Iowa State Cyclones (0–0)

Quarter	1	2	3	4	Total
Northern Iowa	0	0	3	6	9
Iowa State	14	9	7	0	30

at Jack Trice Stadium • Ames, IA

- Date: Saturday, September 2, 2023
- Game time: 1:00 p.m. CDT
- Game weather: sunny, SW 10 MPH • Temperature: 89°F
- Game attendance: 58,248
- Referee: Kevin Boitmann
- TV announcers (ESPN+): Shawn Kenney, Todd Doxzon

Game information

First Quarter

- (12:45) ISU – Cooper, Jeremiah 58 yd interception (Contreraz, Chase kick) (ISU 7–0)
- (1:21) ISU – Becht, Rocco 1 yd run (Contreraz, Chase kick) (Drive: 7 plays, 21 yards, 3:48; ISU 14–0)

Second Quarter

- (0:48) ISU – Moore, Tyler 14 yd pass from Becht, Rocco (PAT Failed) (Drive: 6 plays, 71 yards, 2:51; ISU 20–0)
- (07:54) ISU – Contreraz, Chase 56 yd field goal (Drive: 1 plays, - yards, 0:04; ISU 23–0)

Third Quarter

- (13:08) ISU – Brahmer, Benjamin 36 yd pass from Becht, Rocco (Contreraz, Chase kick) (Drive: 4 plays, 87 yards, 1:48; ISU 30–0)
- (08:03) UNI - Cook, Matthew 31 yd field goal (Drive: 12 plays, 61 yards, 5:05; ISU 30–3)

Fourth Quarter

- (11:30) UNI - Hutson, Desmond 3 yd pass from Day, Theo (2 Pt Conversion Failed ) (Drive: 5 plays, 57 yards, 1:55; ISU 30–9)

Statistics	UNI	ISU
First downs	19	11
Total yards	279	250
Rushes/yards	37/106	27/134
Passing yards	173	116
Passing: Comp–Att–Int	17–35–2	14–18–0
Turnovers	2	0
Time of possession	34:24	25:36

Team	Category	Player	Statistics
UNI	Passing	Theo Day	16–34, 164 YDS, 1 TD, 2 INT
UNI	Rushing	Tye Edwards	16 CAR, 72 YDS
UNI	Receiving	Logan Wolf	3 REC, 40 YDS
Iowa State	Passing	Rocco Becht	10–13, 113 yards, 2 TD
Iowa State	Rushing	Cartevious Norton	11 CAR, 49 YDS
Iowa State	Receiving	Benjamin Brahmer	1 REC, 36 YDS, TD

=== Vs. Iowa ===
Iowa Hawkeyes (1–0) vs. Iowa State Cyclones (1–0)

Quarter	1	2	3	4	Total
Iowa	3	14	3	0	20
Iowa State	0	3	0	10	13

at Jack Trice Stadium • Ames, IA

- Date: Saturday, September 9, 2023
- Game time: 2:30 p.m. CDT
- Game weather: cloudy, SW 5 MPH • Temperature: 80°F
- Game attendance: 61,500
- Referee: Jerry McGinn
- TV announcers (FOX): Jason Benetti, Brock Huard, Allison Williams (sideline)

Game information

First Quarter

- (5:56) UI – Stevens, Drew 28 yd field goal (Drive: 7 plays, 70 yards, 2:44; UI 3–0)

Second Quarter

- (13:39) UI – Patterson, Jaziun 4 yd run (Stevens, Drew kick) (Drive: 8 plays, 80 yards, 4:40; UI 10–0)
- (4:29) UI – Castro, Sebastian 30 yd interception (Stevens, Drew kick) (UI 17–0)
- (0:04) ISU – Contreraz, Chase 42 yd field goal (Drive: 11 plays, 51 yards, 4:25; UI 17–3)

Third Quarter

- (13:08) UI – Stevens, Drew 34 yd field goal (Drive: 11 plays, 69 yards, 5:48; UI 20–3)

Fourth Quarter

- (13:18) ISU - Contreraz, Chase 46 yd field goal (Drive: 8 plays, 31 yards, 2:31; UI 20–6)
- (2:53) ISU - Higgins, Jayden 16 yd pass from Becht, Rocco (Contreraz, Chase kick) (Drive: 14 plays, 80 yards, 6:59; UI 20–13)

Statistics	UI	ISU
First downs	9	19
Total yards	235	290
Rushes/yards	29/112	31/87
Passing yards	123	203
Passing: Comp–Att–Int	12–22–1	23–44–1
Turnovers	1	1
Time of possession	26:30	33:30

Team	Category	Player	Statistics
UI	Passing	Cade McNamara	12–22, 123 YDS, 1 INT
UI	Rushing	Jaziun Patterson	10 CAR, 86 YDS, TD
UI	Receiving	Luke Lachey	3 REC, 58 YDS
Iowa State	Passing	Rocco Becht	23–44, 203 yards, TD, INT
Iowa State	Rushing	Cartevious Norton	21 CAR, 59 YDS
Iowa State	Receiving	Jayden Higgins	8 REC, 95 YDS, TD

=== At Ohio ===
Iowa State Cyclones (1–1) vs. Ohio Bobcats (2–1)

Quarter	1	2	3	4	Total
Iowa State	0	0	0	7	7
Ohio	0	0	7	3	10

at Peden Stadium • Athens, OH

- Date: Saturday, September 16, 2023
- Game time: 11:00 a.m. CDT
- Game weather: sunny
- Game attendance: 21,991
- Referee: Henry Johns
- TV announcers (ESPNU): John Schriffen, Rocky Boiman, Dawn Davenport

Game information

Third Quarter

- (11:18) OHI - Wiglusz, Sam 5 yd pass from Rourke, Kurtis (Spetic, Gianni kick) (Drive: 6 plays, 23 yards, 2:51; OU 7–0)

Fourth Quarter

- (13:58) OHI - Spetic, Gianni 27 yd field goal (Drive: 12 plays, 81 yards, 5:47; OU 10–0)
- (2:53) ISU - Higgins, Jayden 18 yd pass from Becht, Rocco (Contreraz, Chase kick) 2 plays, 72 yards, TOP 00:48 (Drive: 2 plays, 72 yards, 0:48; OU 10–7)

Statistics	ISU	OU
First downs	13	18
Total yards	271	247
Rushes/yards	23/38	37/112
Passing yards	233	135
Passing: Comp–Att–Int	17–24–2	16–32–0
Turnovers	2	0
Time of possession	24:09	35:51

Team	Category	Player	Statistics
Iowa State	Passing	Rocco Becht	17–24, 233 yards, TD, 2 INT
Iowa State	Rushing	Rocco Becht	9 CAR, 31 YDS
Iowa State	Receiving	Daniel Jackson	3 REC, 65 YDS
OU	Passing	Kurtis Rourke	16–32, 135 yards, TD
OU	Rushing	Kurtis Rourke	7 CAR, 58 YDS
OU	Receiving	Sam Wiglusz	5 REC, 53 YDS, TD

=== Vs. Oklahoma State ===
Oklahoma State Cowboys (2–1) vs. Iowa State Cyclones (1–2)

Quarter	1	2	3	4	Total
Oklahoma State	7	10	3	7	27
Iowa State	7	13	7	7	34

at Jack Trice Stadium • Ames, IA

- Date: Saturday, September 23, 2023
- Game time: 3:00 p.m. CDT
- Game weather: cloudy, SE 15 MPH • Temperature: 79°F
- Game attendance: 59,022
- Referee: David Alvarez
- TV announcers (FS1): Dan Hellie, Petros Papadakis

Game information

First Quarter

- (5:40) OSU - Bowman, Alan 12 yd run (Hale, Alex kick) (Drive: 2 plays, 83 yards, 0:55; OSU 7–0)
- (3:23) ISU - Noel, Jaylin 38 yd pass from Becht, Rocco (Contreraz, Chase kick) (Drive: 5 plays, 75 yards, 2:17; Tied 7–7)

Second Quarter

- (12:55) ISU - Jackson, Daniel 29 yd pass from Becht, Rocco (Contreraz, Chase kick) (Drive: 3 plays, 62 yards, 1:09; ISU 14–7)
- (11:01) OSU - Nixon, Jaden 60 yd pass from Bowman, Alan (Hale, Alex kick) (Drive: 4 plays, 75 yards, 1:54; Tied 14–14)
- (7:12) ISU - Contreraz, Chase 51 yd field goal (Drive: 9 plays, 42 yards, 3:49; ISU 17–14)
- (0:43) ISU - Contreraz, Chase 46 yd field goal (Drive: 14 plays, 56 yards, 5:27; ISU 20–14)
- (0:00) OSU - Hale, Alex 38 yd field goal (Drive: 7 plays, 44 yards, 0:43; ISU 20–17)

Third Quarter

- (5:30) ISU - Jackson, Daniel 26 yd pass from Becht, Rocco (Contreraz, Chase kick) (Drive: 2 plays, 47 yards, 0:45; ISU 27–17)
- (2:54) OSU - Hale, Alex 53 yd field goal (Drive: 7 plays, 40 yards, 2:36; ISU 27–20)

Fourth Quarter

- (14:54) ISU - Sanders, Eli 7 yd run (Contreraz, Chase kick) (Drive: 6 plays, 75 yards, 3:00; ISU 34–20)
- (2:46) OSU - Owens, Rashod 20 yd pass from Bowman, Alan (Hale, Alex kick) (Drive: 11 plays, 65 yards, 3:48; ISU 34–27)

Statistics	OSU	ISU
First downs	18	20
Total yards	409	422
Rushes/yards	24/131	34/74
Passing yards	278	348
Passing: Comp–Att–Int	23–48–2	27–38–0
Turnovers	2	0
Time of possession	25:19	34:41

Team	Category	Player	Statistics
OSU	Passing	Alan Bowman	23–48, 278 YDS, 2 TD, 2 INT
OSU	Rushing	Ollie Gordon II	18 CAR, 121 YDS
OSU	Receiving	Jaden Nixon	3 REC, 60 YDS, TD
Iowa State	Passing	Rocco Becht	27–38, 348 yards, 3 TD
Iowa State	Rushing	Eli Sanders	15 CAR, 58 YDS, TD
Iowa State	Receiving	Jaylin Noel	8 REC, 146 YDS, TD

=== At No. 14 Oklahoma ===
Iowa State Cyclones (2–2) vs. #14 Oklahoma Sooners (4–0)

Quarter	1	2	3	4	Total
Iowa State	10	10	0	0	20
#14 Oklahoma	21	19	7	3	50

at Gaylord Family Oklahoma Memorial Stadium • Norman, OK

- Date: Saturday, September 30, 2023
- Game time: 6:00 p.m. CDT
- Game weather: sunny, NW 13 MPH • Temperature: 90°F
- Game attendance: 84,371
- Referee: Stephen Baron
- TV announcers (FS1): Jeff Levering, Mark Helfrich

Game information

First Quarter

- (14:03) OU - Bowman, Billy 44 yd interception (Schmit, Zach kick) (OU 7–0)
- (10:50) ISU - Noel, Jaylin 51 yd pass from Becht, Rocco (Contreraz, Chase kick)(Drive: 6 plays, 75 yards, 3:13; Tied 7–7)
- (6:27) OU - Gabriel, Dillon 1 yd run (Schmit, Zach kick) (Drive: 10 plays, 75 yards, 4:23; OU 14–7)
- (2:14) ISU - Contreraz, Chase 35 yd field goal (Drive: 10 plays, 58 yards, 4:13; OU 14–10)
- (0:26) OU - Anderson, Nic 39 yd pass from Gabriel, Dillon (Schmit, Zach kick) (Drive: 6 plays, 75 yards, 1:42; OU 21–10)

Second Quarter

- (14:55) ISU - Higgins, Jayden 67 yd pass from Becht, Rocco (Contreraz, Chase kick) (Drive: 3 plays, 75 yards, 0:31; OU 21–17)
- (9:46) ISU - Contreraz, Chase 48 yd field goal (Drive: 9 plays, 50 yards, 3:59; OU 21–20)
- (6:49) OU - Gabriel, Dillon 6 yd run (Schmit, Zach kick) (Drive: 6 plays, 75 yards, 2:17; OU 28–20)
- (6:06) OU - 0 yd safety (OU 30–20)
- (3:32) OU - Schmit, Zach 46 yd field goal (Drive: 8 plays, 30 yards, 2:28; OU 33–20)
- (0:07) OU - Stoops, Drake 2 yd pass from Gabriel, Dillon (Schmit, Zach kick) (Drive: 7 plays, 43 yards, 1:59; OU 40–20)

Third Quarter

- (12:26) OU - Gibson, Jayden 41 yd pass from Gabriel, Dillon (Schmit, Zach kick) (Drive: 8 plays, 85 yards, 2:29; OU 47–17)

Fourth Quarter

- (8:41) OU - Schmit, Zach 30 yd field goal (Drive: 14 plays, 51 yards, 6:45; OU 50–20)

Statistics	ISU	OU
First downs	16	30
Total yards	352	523
Rushes/yards	27/150	41/157
Passing yards	202	366
Passing: Comp–Att–Int	19–37–2	26–39–1
Turnovers	2	1
Time of possession	26:56	33:04

Team	Category	Player	Statistics
ISU	Passing	Rocco Becht	15–33, 188 YDS, 2 TD, 2 INT
ISU	Rushing	Abu Sama	7 CAR, 67 YDS
ISU	Receiving	Jayden Higgins	3 REC, 91 YDS, TD
Oklahoma	Passing	Dillon Gabriel	26–39, 366 yards, 3 TD, INT
Oklahoma	Rushing	Marcus Major	19 CAR, 66 YDS
Oklahoma	Receiving	Jalil Farooq	5 REC, 81 YDS

=== Vs. TCU ===
TCU Horned Frogs (3–2) vs. Iowa State Cyclones (2–3)

Quarter	1	2	3	4	Total
TCU	0	7	0	7	14
Iowa State	7	3	14	3	27

at Jack Trice Stadium • Ames, IA

- Date: Saturday, October 7, 2023
- Game time: 7:00 p.m. CDT
- Game weather: cloudy, W 3 MPH • Temperature: 58°F
- Game attendance: 60,535
- Referee: Kevin Mar
- TV announcers (FS1): Alex Faust, Petros Papadakis

Game information

First Quarter

- (0:23) ISU - Sanders, Eli 4 yd run (Contreraz, Chase kick) (Drive: 5 plays, 49 yards, 2:13; ISU 7–0)

Second Quarter

- (10:28) TCU - Williams, Savion 6 yd pass from Morris, Chandler (Kell, Griffin kick) (Drive: 11 plays, 78 yards, 4:47; Tied 7–7)
- (0:00) ISU - Contreraz, Chase 26 yd field goal (Drive: 4 plays, 3 yards, 0:44; ISU 10–7)

Third Quarter

- (11:30) ISU - ISU - Sama, Abu 55 yd run (Contreraz, Chase kick) (Drive: 2 plays, 74 yards, 0:35; ISU 17–7)
- (3:27) ISU - Dean, Easton 1 yd pass from Becht, Rocco (Contreraz, Chase kick) (Drive: 11 plays, 38 yards, 5:29; ISU 24–7)

Fourth Quarter

- (11:27) ISU - Contreraz, Chase 21 yd field goal (Drive: 8 plays, 72 yards, 4:56; ISU 27–7)
- (1:17) TCU - Nowell, Blake 9 yd pass from Hoover, Josh (Kell, Griffin kick) (Drive: 6 plays, 43 yards, 0:58; ISU 27–14)

Statistics	TCU	ISU
First downs	23	16
Total yards	398	353
Rushes/yards	37/185	37/215
Passing yards	213	138
Passing: Comp–Att–Int	21–36–4	16–28–0
Turnovers	4	0
Time of possession	27:42	32:18

Team	Category	Player	Statistics
TCU	Passing	Josh Hoover	11–19, 119 YDS, TD, INT
TCU	Rushing	Emani Bailey	21 CAR, 152 YDS
TCU	Receiving	Warren Thompson	2 REC, 35 YDS
Iowa State	Passing	Rocco Becht	16–28, 138 yards, TD
Iowa State	Rushing	Eli Sanders	16 CAR, 99 YDS, TD
Iowa State	Receiving	Jaylin Noel	7 REC, 34 YDS

=== at Cincinnati ===
Iowa State Cyclones (3–3) vs. Cincinnati Bearcats (2–3)

Quarter	1	2	3	4	Total
Iowa State	3	14	6	7	30
Cincinnati	7	0	3	0	10

at Nippert Stadium • Cincinnati, OH

- Date: Saturday, October 14, 2023
- Game time: 12:00 p.m. EDT
- Game weather: sunny, transitioning to showers; W 10 MPH • Temperature: 59°F
- Game attendance: 38,193
- Referee: Kevin Boitmann
- TV announcers (FS1): Eric Collins, Devin Gardner

Game information

First Quarter

- (5:31) ISU - Contreraz, Chase 30 yd field goal (Drive: 6 plays, 23 yards, 2:12; ISU 3–0)
- (0:42) UC - Metayer, Chamon 20 yd pass from Jones, Emory (Brown, Carter kick) (Drive: 10 plays, 75 yards, 4:49; UC 7–3)

Second Quarter

- (7:48) ISU - Becht, Rocco 2 yd run (Contreraz, Chase kick) (Drive: 15 plays, 59 yards, 7:45; ISU 10–7)
- (3:43) ISU - Brahmer, Benjamin 14 yd pass from Becht, Rocco (Contreraz, Chase kick) (Drive: 5 plays, 81 yards, 1:39; ISU 17–7)

Third Quarter

- (10:45) ISU - Contreraz, Chase 34 yd field goal (Drive: 7 plays, 12 yards, 4:03; ISU 20–7)
- (4:03) UC - Brown, Carter 36 yd field goal (Drive: 14 plays, 56 yards, 6:42; ISU 20–10)
- (1:10) ISU - Contreraz, Chase 30 yd field goal (Drive: 6 plays, 45 yards, 2:53; ISU 23–10)

Fourth Quarter

- (10:00) ISU - Klotz, Stevo 13 yd pass from Becht, Rocco (Contreraz, Chase kick) (Drive: 7 plays, 69 yards, 4:05; ISU 30–10)

Statistics	ISU	UC
First downs	17	15
Total yards	362	214
Rushes/yards	38/123	33/115
Passing yards	241	99
Passing: Comp–Att–Int	15–25–0	15–29–2
Turnovers	0	2
Time of possession	33:40	26:20

Team	Category	Player	Statistics
ISU	Passing	Rocco Becht	15–25, 241 YDS, 2 TD
ISU	Rushing	Eli Sanders	16 CAR, 52 YDS
ISU	Receiving	Jayden Higgins	6 REC, 172 YDS
Cincinnati	Passing	Emory Jones	14–26, 96 yards, TD, 2 INT
Cincinnati	Rushing	Emory Jones	15 CAR, 72 YDS
Cincinnati	Receiving	Chamon Metayer	4 REC, 43 YDS, TD

=== At Baylor ===
Iowa State Cyclones (4–3) vs. Baylor Bears (3–4)

Quarter	1	2	3	4	Total
Iowa State	7	10	10	3	30
Baylor	0	6	6	6	18

at McLane Stadium • Waco, TX

- Date: Saturday, October 28, 2023
- Game time: 2:30 p.m. CDT
- Game weather: rain; SW 8 MPH • Temperature: 71 °F (22 °C)
- Game attendance: 43,528
- Referee: David Alvarez
- TV announcers (ESPN+): Mark Neely, Barrett Brooks

Game information

First Quarter

- (11:56) ISU - Higgins, Jayden 18 yd pass from Becht, Rocco (Contreraz, Chase kick) (Drive: 4 plays, 55 yards, 1:37; ISU 7–0)

Second Quarter

- (12:39) ISU - Contreraz, Chase 42 yd field goal (Drive: 9 plays, 42 yards, 4:47; ISU 10–0)
- (3:03) ISU - Norton, Cartevious 1 yd run (Contreraz, Chase kick) (Drive: 7 plays, 27 yards, 2:55; ISU 17–0)
- (0:44) BU - Pendergrass, Dawson 8 yd run (Hankins, Isaiah kick attempt failed) (Drive: 7 plays, 40 yards, 1:00; ISU 17–6)

Third Quarter

- (11:15) ISU - Norton, Cartevious 49 yd run (Contreraz, Chase kick) (Drive: 7 plays, 73 yards, 3:45; ISU 24–6)
- (7:13) ISU - Contreraz, Chase 45 yd field goal (Drive: 5 plays, 34 yards, 2:52; ISU 27–6)
- (5:49) BU - Baldwin, Monaray 69 yd pass from Shapen, Blake (Shapen, Blake rush attempt failed) (Drive: 4 plays, 75 yards, 1:24; ISU 27–12)

Fourth Quarter

- (13:36) BU - Pendergrass, Dawson 5 yd run (Shapen, Blake pass attempt failed) (Drive: 10 plays, 69 yards, 4:56; ISU 27–18)
- (8:23) ISU - Contreraz, Chase 25 yd field goal (Drive: 12 plays, 69 yards, 5:13; ISU 30–18)

Statistics	ISU	BU
First downs	19	17
Total yards	400	306
Rushes/yards	35/162	25/67
Passing yards	238	239
Passing: Comp–Att–Int	19–31–1	24–41–1
Turnovers	2	2
Time of possession	33:33	26:27

Team	Category	Player	Statistics
ISU	Passing	Rocco Becht	19–31, 238 YDS, TD, INT
ISU	Rushing	Eli Sanders	14 CAR, 90 YDS
ISU	Receiving	Jaylin Noel	8 REC, 76 YDS
Baylor	Passing	Blake Shapen	24–41, 239 yards, TD, INT
Baylor	Rushing	Dawson Pendergrass	8 CAR, 37 YDS, 2 TD
Baylor	Receiving	Monaray Baldwin	6 REC, 117 YDS, TD

=== Vs. No. 21 Kansas ===
Kansas Jayhawks (6–2) vs. Iowa State Cyclones (5–3)

Quarter	1	2	3	4	Total
Kansas	7	7	7	7	28
Iowa State	0	3	8	10	21

at Jack Trice Stadium • Ames, IA

- Date: Saturday, October 7, 2023
- Game time: 6:00 p.m. CDT
- Game weather: clear, W 3 MPH • Temperature: 58°F
- Game attendance: 61,500
- Referee: Tutashinda Salaam
- TV announcers (ESPN): Mike Monaco, Robert Griffin III, Kris Budden

Game information

First Quarter

- (8:40) KAN - Neal, Devin 6 yd run (Keller, Seth kick) (Drive: 9 plays, 87 yards, 4:32; KU 7–0)

Second Quarter

- (10:21) KAN - Dotson, Ra'Mello 50 yd interception (Keller, Seth kick) (KU 14–0)
- (0:03) ISU - Contreraz, Chase 35 yd field goal (Drive: 7 plays, 50 yards, 0:35; KU 14–3)

Third Quarter

- (9:24) KAN - Neal, Devin 1 yd run (Piepergerdes, Owen kick) (Drive: 11 plays, 75 yards, 5:36; KU 21–3)
- (3:26) ISU - ISU - Sanders, Eli 6 yd run (Sanders, Eli rush), 9 plays, 75 yards, TOP 05:58 (Drive: 9 plays, 75 yards, 5:58; KU 21–11)

Fourth Quarter

- (8:09) ISU - ISU - Becht, Rocco 2 yd run (Contreraz, Chase kick) (Drive: 12 plays, 90 yards, 6:59; KU 21–18)
- (7:51) KAN - Arnold, Lawrence 80 yd pass from Bean, Jason (Piepergerdes, Owen kick) (Drive: 1 play, 80 yards, 0:12; KU 28–18)
- (4:53) ISU - Contreraz, Chase 29 yd field goal (Drive: 7 plays, 64 yards, 2:58; KU 28–21)

Statistics	Kansas	ISU
First downs	16	16
Total yards	361	333
Rushes/yards	35/74	29/75
Passing yards	287	258
Passing: Comp–Att–Int	14–23–0	21–27–1
Turnovers	0	1
Time of possession	30:27	29:33

Team	Category	Player	Statistics
KU	Passing	Jason Bean	14–23, 287 YDS, TD
KU	Rushing	Devin Neal	21 CAR, 57 YDS, 2 TD
KU	Receiving	Lawrence Arnold	3 REC, 112 YDS, TD
Iowa State	Passing	Rocco Becht	20–26, 216 yards, INT
Iowa State	Rushing	Eli Sanders	14 CAR, 57 YDS, TD
Iowa State	Receiving	Dmitri Stanley	5 REC, 59 YDS

=== At BYU ===
Iowa State Cyclones (5–4) vs. BYU Cougars (5–4)

Quarter	1	2	3	4	Total
Iowa State	17	14	14	0	45
BYU	7	0	6	0	13

at LaVell Edwards Stadium • Provo, UT

- Date: Saturday, November 11, 2023
- Game time: 8:15 p.m. MST
- Game weather: clear; NW 3 MPH • Temperature: 43°F
- Game attendance: 60,754
- Referee: Henry Johns
- TV announcers (ESPN): Dave Flemming, Brock Osweiler, Kayla Burton

Game information

First Quarter

- (13:32) ISU - Noel, Jaylin 4 yd pass from Becht, Rocco (Contreraz, Chase kick) (Drive: 3 plays, 28 yards, 1:16; ISU 7–0)
- (11:34) ISU - Contreraz, Chase 31 yd field goal (Drive: 4 plays, 4 yards, 1:57; ISU 10–0)
- (8:47) BYU - Phillips, Jojo 5 yd pass from Retzlaff, Jake (Ferrin, Will kick) (Drive: 7 plays, 75 yards, 2:47; ISU 10–7)
- (1:03) ISU - Sanders, Eli 4 yd run (Contreraz, Chase kick) (Drive: 9 plays, 72 yards, 4:49; ISU 17–7)

Second Quarter

- (8:02) ISU - Norton, Cartevious 11 yd run (Contreraz, Chase kick) (Drive: 11 plays, 80 yards, 5:27; ISU 24–7)
- (1:28) ISU - Sama, Abu 13 yd run (Contreraz, Chase kick) (Drive: 9 plays, 66 yards, 5:14; ISU 31–7)

Third Quarter

- (10:05) BYU - Rex, Isaac 26 yd pass from Kingston, Parker (Retzlaff, Jake pass attempt failed) (Drive: 7 plays, 65 yards, 3:31; ISU 31–13)
- (8:27) ISU - Noel, Jaylin 66 yd pass from Becht, Rocco (Contreraz, Chase kick) (Drive: 3 plays, 75 yards, 1:38; ISU 38–13)
- (5:36) ISU - Sama, Abu 59 yd run (Contreraz, Chase kick) (Drive: 2 plays, 64 yards, 0:16; ISU 45–13)

Statistics	ISU	BYU
First downs	21	18
Total yards	443	318
Rushes/yards	37/234	38/188
Passing yards	209	130
Passing: Comp–Att–Int	16–25–0	11–28–2
Turnovers	0	3
Time of possession	33:01	26:59

Team	Category	Player	Statistics
ISU	Passing	Rocco Becht	15–23, 203 YDS, 2 TD
ISU	Rushing	Abu Sama III	8 CAR, 110 YDS, 2 TD
ISU	Receiving	Jaylin Noel	5 REC, 98 YDS, 2 TD
BYU	Passing	Jake Retzlaff	10–27, 104 yards, TD, 2 INT
BYU	Rushing	Jake Retzlaff	17 CAR, 64 YDS
BYU	Receiving	Isaac Rex	3 REC, 52 YDS, TD

=== Vs. No. 7 Texas ===
Texas Longhorns (9-1) vs. Iowa State Cyclones (6-4)

Quarter	1	2	3	4	Total
Texas	0	6	9	11	26
Iowa State	3	0	6	7	16

at Jack Trice Stadium • Ames, IA

- Date: Saturday, November 18, 2023
- Game time: 7:00 p.m. CDT
- Game weather: fair, S 3 MPH • Temperature: 46°F
- Game attendance: 61,500
- Referee: Kevin Boitmann
- TV announcers (FOX): Jason Benetti, Brock Huard

Game information

First Quarter

- (3:27) ISU - Contreraz, Chase 45 yd field goal (Drive: 11 plays, 53 yards, 5:47; ISU 3–0)

Second Quarter

- (11:17) Texas - Auburn, Bert 39 yd field goal (Drive: 7 plays, 11 yards, 3:31; Tied 3–3)
- (0:00) Texas - Auburn, Bert 50 yd field goal (Drive: 10 plays, 58 yards, 2:25; Texas 6–3)

Third Quarter

- (5:53) Texas - Whittington, Jordan 23 yd pass from Ewers, Quinn (Auburn, Bert kick) (Drive: 9 plays, 91 yards, 4:25; Texas 13–3)
- (2:13) ISU - Sanders, Eli 14 yd pass from Becht, Rocco (Contreraz, Chase PAT Blocked) (Drive: 7 plays, 83 yards, 3:34; Texas 13–9)
- (2:13) Texas - Jordan, Austin Defensive PAT Conversion (Drive: 7 plays, 83 yards, 3:34; Texas 15-9)

Fourth Quarter

- (14:52) Texas - Helm, Gunnar 31 yd pass from Ewers, Quinn (Ewers, Quinn pass to Whittington, Jordan for two-point conversion (Drive: 3 plays, 57 yards, 1:06; Texas 23–9)
- (12:44) ISU - Dean, Easton 66 yd pass from Becht, Rocco (Contreraz, Chase kick) (Drive: 4 plays, 75 yards, 2:08; Texas 23–16)
- (6:14) Texas - Auburn, Bert 42 yd field goal (Drive: 11 plays, 56 yards, 6:26; Texas 26-16)

Statistics	Texas	ISU
First downs	23	16
Total yards	404	332
Rushes/yards	34/123	21/9
Passing yards	281	323
Passing: Comp–Att–Int	23–33–0	24–32–1
Turnovers	1	1
Time of possession	31:18	28:42

Team	Category	Player	Statistics
Texas	Passing	Quinn Ewers	23–33, 281 YDS, 2 TD
Texas	Rushing	CJ Baxter	20 CAR, 117 YDS
Texas	Receiving	Xavier Worthy	4 REC, 77 YDS
Iowa State	Passing	Rocco Becht	24–32, 323 yards, 2 TD, 1 INT
Iowa State	Rushing	Abu Sama III	7 CAR, 11 YDS,
Iowa State	Receiving	Jayden Higgins	7 REC, 104 YDS

=== At No. 19 Kansas State ===
Iowa State Cyclones (6–5) vs. Kansas State Wildcats (8–3)

Quarter	1	2	3	4	Total
Iowa State	7	7	14	14	42
Kansas State	6	14	8	7	35

at Bill Snyder Family Football Stadium • Manhattan, KS

- Date: Saturday, November 25, 2023
- Game time: 7:00 p.m. CDT
- Game weather: snow; NW 2 MPH • Temperature: 26°F
- Game attendance: 51,481
- Referee: Derek Anderson
- TV announcers (FOX): Tim Brando, Spencer Tillman, Josh Sims

Game information

First Quarter

- (14:42) ISU - Sama, Abu 71 yd run (Contreraz, Chase kick) (Drive: 1 play, 71 yards, 0:11; ISU 7–0)
- (8:17) KSU - Tennant, Chris 23 yd field goal (Drive: 7 plays, 34 yards, 3:36; ISU 7–3)
- (0:16) KSU - Tennant, Chris 22 yd field goal (Drive: 14 plays, 80 yards, 6:29; ISU 7–6)

Second Quarter

- (14:47) ISU - Sama, Abu 77 yd run (Contreraz, Chase kick) (Drive: 2 plays, 81 yards, 0:27; ISU 14–6)
- (8:55) KSU - Giddens, DJ 1 yd run (Tennant, Chris kick) (Drive: 12 plays, 87 yards, 5:44; ISU 14–13)
- (0:15) KSU - Sinnott, Ben 15 yd pass from Howard, Will (Tennant, Chris kick) (Drive: 8 plays, 41 yards, 0:49; KSU 20–14)

Third Quarter

- (10:37) ISU - Noel, Jaylin 79 yd pass from Becht, Rocco (Contreraz, Chase kick) (Drive: 2 plays, 82 yards, 0:48; ISU 21–20)
- (6:36) KSU - Howard, Will 5 yd run (Brooks, Phillip pass) (Drive: 9 plays, 79 yards, 3:55; KSU 28–21)
- (4:53) ISU - Sama, Abu 60 yd run (Contreraz, Chase kick) (Drive: 4 plays, 72 yards, 1:37; Tied 28–28)

Fourth Quarter

- (14:49) KSU - Ward, Treshaun 2 yd run (Tennant, Chris kick) (Drive: 11 plays, 75 yards, 5:04; KSU 35–28)
- (12:31) ISU - Higgins, Jayden 33 yd pass from Becht, Rocco (Contreraz, Chase kick) (Drive: 4 plays, 60 yards, 2:10; Tied 35–35)
- (8:04) ISU - Noel, Jaylin 82 yd pass from Becht, Rocco (Contreraz, Chase kick) (Drive: 3 plays, 76 yards, 2:03; ISU 42–35)

Statistics	ISU	KSU
First downs	10	32
Total yards	488	497
Rushes/yards	23/258	54/209
Passing yards	230	288
Passing: Comp–Att–Int	8–12–0	24–48–1
Turnovers	2	1
Time of possession	17:48	42:12

Team	Category	Player	Statistics
ISU	Passing	Rocco Becht	8–12, 230 YDS, 3 TD
ISU	Rushing	Abu Sama III	16 CAR, 276 YDS, 3 TD
ISU	Receiving	Jaylin Noel	3 REC, 160 YDS, 2 TD
KSU	Passing	Will Howard	24–48, 288 yards, TD, INT
KSU	Rushing	DJ Giddens	31 CAR, 114 YDS, TD
KSU	Receiving	Ben Sinnott	10 REC, 136 YDS, TD

=== Vs. Memphis—Liberty Bowl ===
2023 AutoZone Liberty Bowl
Iowa State Cyclones (7-5, 6-3) vs Memphis Tigers (9-3, 6-2) – Game summary

Quarter	1	2	3	4	Total
Tigers	19	3	14	0	36
Cyclones	0	13	7	6	26

at Simmons Bank Memorial Stadium • Memphis, Tennessee

- Date: Friday, December 29th, 2023
- Game time: 3:30 pm EST/2:30 pm CST/12:30 pm PST
- Game weather: Cloudy • Temperature: 38 °F (3 °C) • Wind: 8 mph (13 km/h) W
- Game attendance: 48,789
- Referee: Matt Loeffler
- TV announcers (ESPN): John Schriffen (play-by-play), Rocky Boiman (analyst), and Dawn Davenport (sideline)
- Box score

Game information

First Quarter

- (13:41) MEM – Demeer Blankumsee 70 yard pass from Seth Henigan, Tanner Gillis kick no good (Drive: 3 plays, 75 yards, 1:19; Memphis 6–0)
- (5:53) MEM – Seth Henigan 11 yard run, Tanner Gillis kick (Drive: 9 plays, 46 yards, 5:00; Memphis 13–0)
- (0:30) MEM – Joseph Scates 51 yard pass from Seth Henigan, two-point pass conversion failed (Drive: 4 plays, 84 yards, 2:15; Memphis 19–0)

Second Quarter

- (11:25) ISU – Jayden Higgins 29 yard pass from Rocco Becht, Chase Contreraz kick (Drive: 7 plays, 75 yards, 4:05; Memphis 19–7)
- (6:19) ISU – Chase Contreraz 22 yard field goal (Drive: 7 plays, 67 yards, 4:03; Memphis 19–10)
- (0:35) ISU – Chase Contreraz 39 yard field goal (Drive: 8 plays, 42 yards, 1:09; Memphis 19–13)
- (0:00) MEM – Tanner Gillis 49 yard field goal (Drive: 4 plays, 44 yards, 0:35; Memphis 22–13)

Third Quarter

- (11:38) MEM – Anthony Landphere 5 yard pass from Seth Henigan, Tanner Gillis kick (Drive: 4 plays, 65 yards, 2:14; Memphis 29–13)
- (7:59) MEM – Sutton Smith 48 yard pass from Seth Henigan, Tanner Gillis kick (Drive: 3 plays, 50 yards, 1:01; Memphis 36–13)
- (4:01) ISU – Easton Dean 15 yard pass from Rocco Becht, Chase Contreraz kick Drive: 7 plays, 85 yards, 3:58; Memphis 36–20)

Fourth Quarter

- (9:55) ISU – Jaylin Noel 23 yard pass from Rocco Becht, two-point pass conversion failed (Drive: 6 plays, 80 yards, 1:57; Memphis 36–26)

Statistics	Memphis	Iowa State
First downs	22	19
Total yards	530	446
Rushes/yards	32–166	20–0
Passing yards	364	446
Passing: Comp–Att–Int	24–34–0	22–40–0
Turnovers	0	0
Time of possession	34:24	25:36

Team	Category	Player	Statistics
Iowa State	Passing	Rocco Becht	22/38, 446 yards, 3 TD
Iowa State	Rushing	Abu Sama III	12 carries, 4 yards
Iowa State	Receiving	Jayden Higgins	9 receptions, 214 yards, TD
Memphis	Passing	Seth Henigan	24/34, 364 yards, 4 TD
Memphis	Rushing	Blake Watson	15 carries, 107 yards
Memphis	Receiving	Roc Taylor	8 receptions, 102 yards

== Personnel ==
=== Coaching staff ===
Iowa State Cyclones
Name	Position	Consecutive season at Iowa State in current position	Previous position	ISU profile
Matt Campbell	Head coach	8th	Toledo – Head coach (2012–2015)	
Jon Heacock	Defensive coordinator	8th	Toledo – Assistant head coach / defensive coordinator / safeties (2014–2015)	
Nathan Scheelhaase	Offensive coordinator / quarterbacks	1st	Iowa State – Running game coordinator / running backs / wide receivers (2021–2022)	
Tyson Veidt	Assistant head coach / linebackers	8th	Toledo – Linebackers (2014–2015)	
Deon Broomfield	Passing game coordinator / safeties	3rd	Houston Texans – Defensive assistant (2020)	
Ryan Clanton	Offensive line	1st	Northern Iowa – Offensive coordinator / offensive line (2018–2022)	
Jordan Langs	Special teams coordinator / running backs	1st	Indiana Wesleyan – Head coach (2016–2022)	
Noah Pauley	Wide receivers	1st	North Dakota State – Wide receivers (2019–2022)	
Hank Poteat	Cornerbacks	1st	Wisconsin – Cornerbacks (2021–2022)	
Eli Rasheed	Defensive line	8th	Toledo – Defensive line (2009–2015)	
Jake Waters	Offensive quality control	4th	UTEP – Wide receivers (2018–2020)	

=== Transfers ===
==== Outgoing ====
Player	Position	Destination
Nate Glantz	QB	McNeese State
Tayvonn Kyle	CB	Virginia
Jayden Gray	CB	Louisiana Tech
Blake Peterson	DE	South Dakota State
Mason Chambers	S	Incarnate Word
Hunter Zenzen	LB	North Dakota State
Tristan Michaud	WR	South Dakota
Deon Silas	RB	Rhode Island
Sean Shaw	WR	Texas State
Howard Brown	DE	Boise State
Johnny Wilson	DL	Unknown
Hunter Deyo	IOL	Bowling Green

==== Incoming ====
Player	Position	Previous school
Tobechi Okoli	DL	Auburn
Tanner Hughes	QB	Butte College
Jayden Higgins	WR	Eastern Kentucky
Zachary Lovett	LB	Missouri
Arlen Harris Jr.	RB	Stanford
