= David Thompson (baseball) =

American baseball player (born 1993)

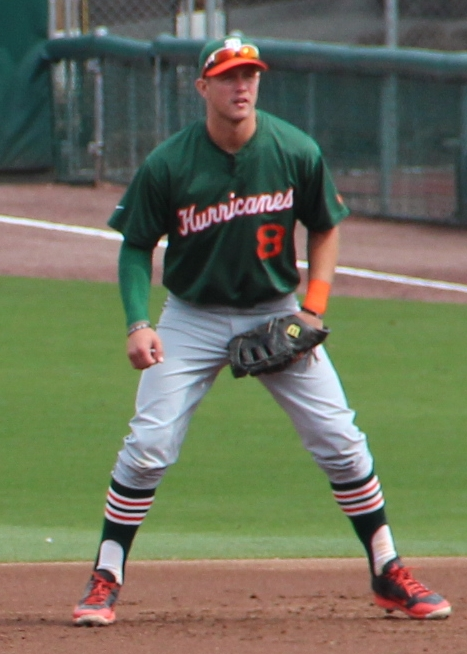
- Thompson in 2014
- Third baseman
- Born: August 28, 1993 (age 32); Miami, Florida, U.S.
- Bats: Right Throws: Right
- Stats at Baseball Reference

David Thompson (born August 28, 1993) is an American former professional baseball third baseman. He played college baseball at the University of Miami. He was drafted by the New York Mets in the fourth round of the 2015 Major League Baseball draft.

== Amateur career ==
Thompson attended Westminster Christian School in Miami, Florida. He played baseball, football and basketball. During his career he hit 55 home runs which broke the Florida state record for career home runs which had been held by Alex Rodriguez. He was also a quarterback in football, throwing for 2,055 yards and 20 touchdowns with 11 rushing touchdowns as a senior. Thompson was drafted by the New York Yankees in the 38th round of the 2012 Major League Baseball draft, but did not sign.

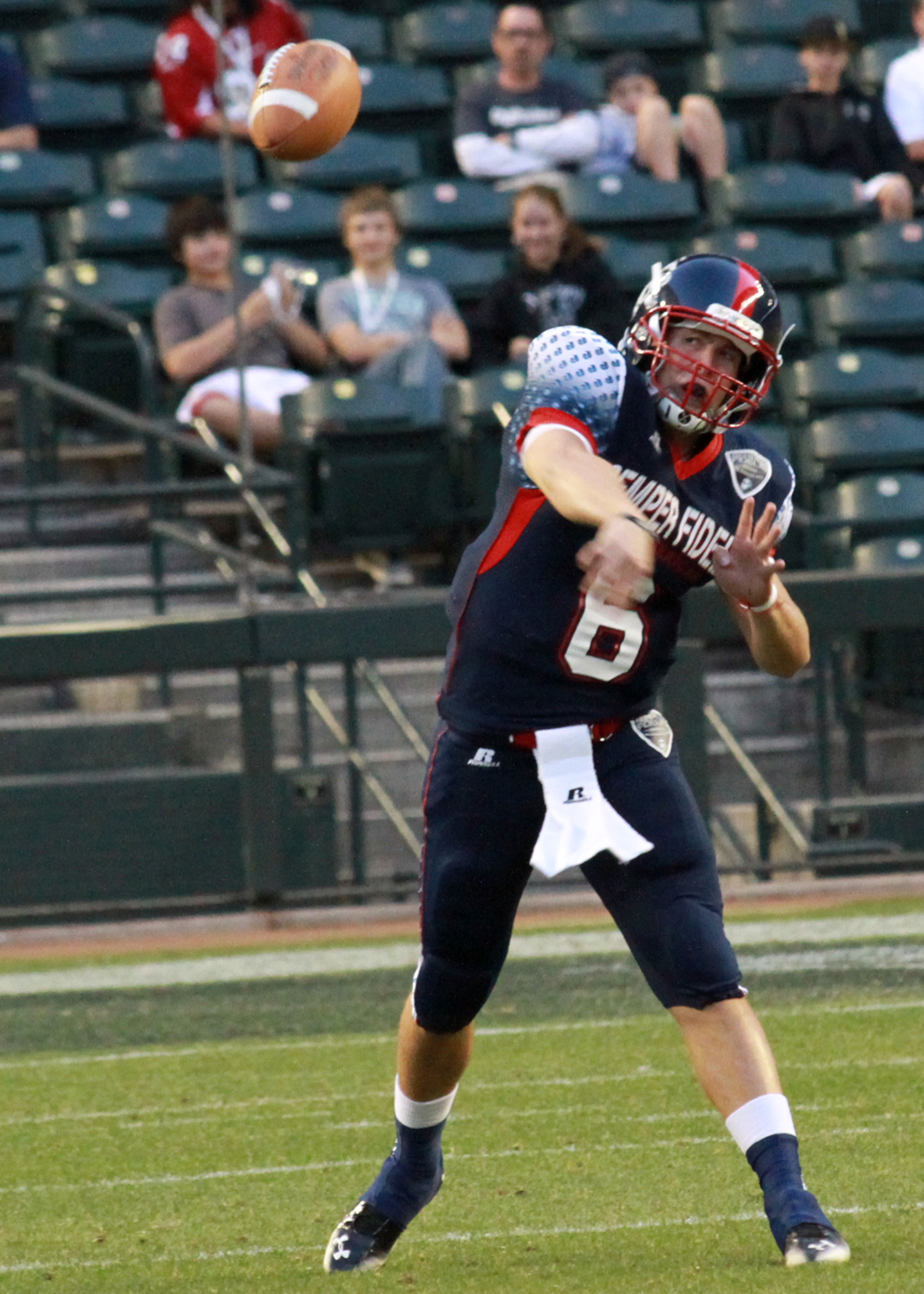
Thompson playing in the 2012 Semper Fidelis All-American Bowl

Thompson originally committed to the University of Miami to play both college baseball and college football. However, he left the football team to focus on baseball full-time. As a freshman, Thompson started 51 of 52 games between first and third base. He hit .286/.368/.462 with six home runs and 46 runs batted in (RBIs) over 182 at-bats. As a sophomore, he played in only 30 games due to a blood clot and thoracic outlet syndrome. In 108 at-bats he hit .278/.368/.352 with 15 RBIs. After the 2014 season, he played collegiate summer baseball with the Orleans Firebirds of the Cape Cod Baseball League, and was named a league all-star. Thompson returned to Miami in 2015 and was named a finalist for the Dick Howser Trophy.

== Professional career ==
=== New York Mets ===
The New York Mets selected Thompson in the fourth round, with the 119th overall selection, of the 2015 Major League Baseball draft. After signing with the Mets, Thompson made his professional debut for the Brooklyn Cyclones of the Low-A New York–Penn League. He spent the whole 2015 season in Brooklyn, where he batted .218 with three home runs and 22 RBI in 59 games. Thompson spent 2016 with both the Columbia Fireflies of the Single-A South Atlantic League and the St. Lucie Mets of the High-A Florida State League; he ended 2016 with a combined .280 batting average, 11 home runs and 95 RBI between both teams.

In 2017, Thompson played for the Binghamton Rumble Ponies of the Double-A Eastern League, where he posted a .263 batting average with 16 home runs and 68 RBI in 133 games. He played in only 25 games in 2018 due to injury. In 2019, Thompson split the year between Double-A Binghamton and the Triple-A Syracuse Mets, slashing .217/.290/.348 with 9 home runs and 45 RBI in 123 combined games.

Thompson did not play in a game in 2020 due to the cancellation of the minor league season because of the COVID-19 pandemic. In 2021, he spent the majority of the year with Triple-A Syracuse, batting .228/.329/.470 with 13 home runs, 39 RBI, and 10 stolen bases in 67 games. He elected free agency following the season on November 7, 2021.

=== Kansas City Monarchs ===
On March 28, 2022, Thompson signed with the Kansas City Monarchs of the American Association of Professional Baseball. Thompson played in 73 games for the Monarchs, hitting .346/.432/.636 with 19 home runs, 63 RBI, and 15 stolen bases. He was named an All-Star for the team in 2022. On April 6, 2023, Thompson was released by the Monarchs.
