= Westminster Christian School (Florida) =

Coordinates: 25.6314932°N 80.3011631°W

Location
- 6865 SW 152 St 33157; Palmetto Bay, Florida; Miami-Dade County, Florida; United States

Information
- Type: Private; college preparatory
- Religious affiliation: Christian
- Denomination: Non-denominational
- Established: 1961
- Head of school: Scott Jones
- Faculty: Approx. 121 full-time, 32 administrative staff
- Grades: PK3–12
- Gender: Co-educational
- Enrollment: 1,280
- Campus size: 31 acres
- Campus type: Suburban
- Colors: Green and white
- Athletics conference: Florida High School Athletic Association (FHSAA)
- Nickname: Warriors
- Rival: Palmer Trinity School
- Tuition: $18,400-$31,700 (2025-26)
- Website: http://www.wcsmiami.org

Westminster Christian School is an independent, college-preparatory Christian school founded in 1961. It serves students from preschool through grade 12 on a 31-acre campus in the Village of Palmetto Bay, Florida, United States, near the Charles Deering Estate. Westminster is accredited by Cognia, Florida Council of Independent Schools and Christian Schools of Florida. The school has earned Microsoft Showcase School status nine years in a row, the only school in the U.S. with this distinction.

Westminster is a covenant school. This means that it partners with families where at least one parent is Christian and actively involved in a local Christian church. Its students come from a variety of denominations, including Presbyterian, Southern Baptist, and non-denominational Christian. Employees are required to be members of Protestant churches.

== History ==
Around the start of the 20th century, Jules Vroon, a two-year-old boy from a conservative Calvinistic family, emigrated from Dinteloord, the Netherlands, to the United States. He grew up in Michigan's Christian schools where all subjects were taught from a Christian perspective. During the Depression, Vroon, then a husband and father, moved his company to Florida. When he found no Christian schools like those he had known as a boy, he shared his vision to bring Christian education to south Florida with friends at Shenandoah Presbyterian Church.

Westminster Christian School opened on September 6, 1961 with four teachers and twelve students on the grounds of Shenandoah Presbyterian Church. Two years later, Westminster moved to its new and current location with an enrollment of 169 students and 14 full-time and five part-time teachers. By 1966, Westminster graduated its first class of high school seniors.

== Timeline of Campus Growth ==
- 1970s - Added middle and high school buildings, athletic facilities and locker rooms; Gymnasium, auditorium and covered outdoor cafeteria added.
- 1980s - Dedicated new media center and science laboratories; Renovated auditorium and fine arts facility
- 1990s - Sixth grade wing added to the middle school campus
- 2000s - Admiraal Deck installed outside of the media center; Added Student Activities Center (2009), including new indoor cafeteria
- 2010s - New middle school and high school science building and laboratories (2011); Construction of new elementary school campus (2013); Purchased five acres adjacent to current property; Added TIDE Center, a classroom and office building focused on technology, innovation, design, and engineering (2017); and a new athletic field (2017); Added the WorldWonder Nature Center, a learning studio for preschool and elementary focused on outdoor science and nature (2019).
- 2020s - The Lighthouse, a performing arts center that includes a theater with seating for 650.

== Athletics ==
Westminster competes in the Florida High School Athletic Association. Westminster's teams are known as the Warriors. The school colors are green and white.

Westminster is the home to the 1992 and 1996 USA Today National Champion baseball teams. The 1996 team adorned the cover of one of the first Team Cheerios boxes, and notable baseball alumni include World Series winners Alex Rodriguez and Doug Mientkiewicz. The baseball team has also earned 11 State Championships: '81, '88, '90, '92, '94, '96, '97, '98, '09, '10, and '15. Other state champion teams include softball ('89, '97, '09, '14, '17, '18), track and field ('73, '75), girls' volleyball ('13, '16, '24), and girls' beach volleyball ('21). The Westminster Athletic program won the All-Dade Major Sports Award for girls ('13-'14, '15-'16, '16-'17, '17-18, '20-'21, '21-'22, '22-'23) and boys ('15-'16, '20-'21). Former Westminster women's softball coach Scott Doan is one of the winningest coaches in the history of Miami-Dade County.

== Notable alumni ==
- J. P. Arencibia '04, former MLB catcher (Toronto Blue Jays)
- J. D. Arteaga '93, head coach of the Miami Hurricanes baseball team
- Ryan Blaum '02, golfer
- John Easterlin '80, operatic tenor, multi Grammy and Emmy award winner, and Guinness Book record holder
- Jayden Higgins '21, NFL wide receiver for Houston Texans
- Oscar Isaac, attended, did not graduate, actor
- Mickey Lopez '92, former MLB infielder (Seattle Mariners)
- Víctor Mederos '20, MLB pitcher for the Los Angeles Angels
- MJ Melendez '17, MLB catcher and outfielder for the Kansas City Royals
- Doug Mientkiewicz '92, former MLB player (Minnesota Twins, Boston Red Sox, New York Mets, Kansas City Royals, New York Yankees, Pittsburgh Pirates, Los Angeles Dodgers)
- Roberto Patino '02, screenwriter
- Dan Perkins '93, former MLB pitcher (Minnesota Twins)
- Derek Phillips '94, stage, screen, and television actor
- Alex Rodriguez '93, former MLB infielder (Seattle Mariners, Texas Rangers, New York Yankees)
- Sal Stewart '22, MLB infielder for the Cincinnati Reds
- David Thompson '12, former University of Miami All-American, drafted by the NY Mets
