= Ryan Silverfield =

American football coach (born 1980)

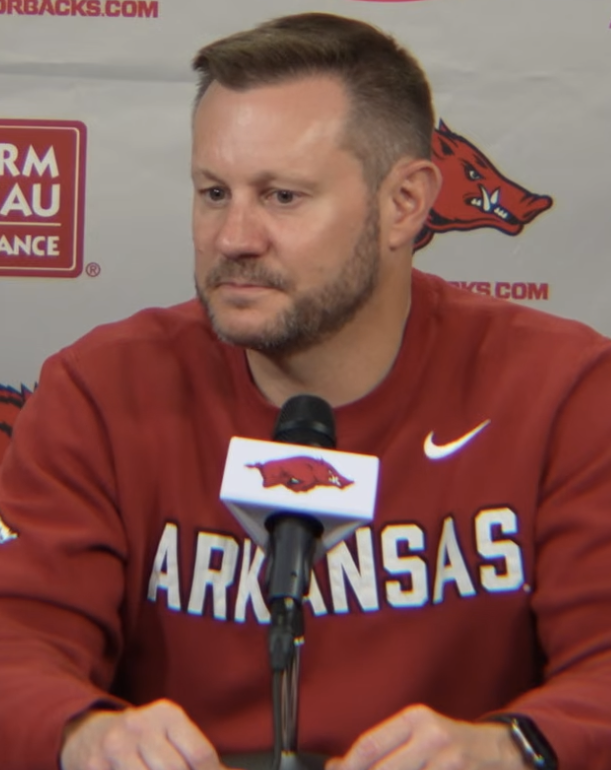
- Silverfield in 2026

Current position
- Title: Head coach
- Team: Arkansas
- Conference: SEC
- Record: 4–7
- Annual salary: $6.5 million

Biographical details
- Born: August 4, 1980 (age 46); Jacksonville, Florida, U.S.
- Education: Hampden–Sydney (2003)

Coaching career (HC unless noted)
- 1999: Bolles School (FL) (assistant)
- 2000: Hampden–Sydney (off. asst.)
- 2001–2002: Hampden–Sydney (student assistant)
- 2003: Hampden–Sydney (TE)
- 2004: Memorial Day HS
- 2005: Jacksonville (QB)
- 2006–2007: UCF (GA)
- 2008: Minnesota Vikings (OQC)
- 2009–2010: Minnesota Vikings (DL staff assistant)
- 2011–2013: Minnesota Vikings (assistant OL)
- 2014: Toledo (off. consultant)
- 2015: Arizona State (OA)
- 2015: Detroit Lions (assistant OL)
- 2016: Memphis (OL)
- 2017–2018: Memphis (RGC/OL)
- 2019: Memphis (AHC/RGC/OL)
- 2020–2025: Memphis
- 2026–present: Arkansas

Head coaching record
- Overall: 54–32 (college); 1–9 (high school)
- Bowls: 4–1

Ryan Daniel Silverfield (born August 4, 1980) is an American football coach. He is the head football coach for the University of Arkansas. Silverfield has spent most of his coaching career, which began during his senior year of high school, as either a line coach or a member of the offensive staff. He was hired at Memphis by then-head coach Mike Norvell prior to the 2016 season. After Norvell's departure to Florida State on December 8, 2019, Silverfield served as the interim head coach before being promoted to head coach on December 28, 2019.

== Playing career ==
Silverfield played on the defensive side of the ball for The Bolles School in Jacksonville, Florida for four years, winning state championships in 1995 and 1998. He then joined the coaching staff as an assistant for the 1999 season, as a neck injury would prevent him furthering his playing career into college.

== Coaching career ==
=== Early coaching career ===
Having played on the number one ranked high school team in the nation - The Bolles School - Silverfield endured a career-ending neck injury which ended his playing career. Thus, after coaching at his high school alma mater for one year, Silverfield landed his first college coaching job during his freshman year at Hampden–Sydney College. He served as an offensive assistant for one year, then as the defensive line coach for his sophomore and junior years, and as the tight ends coach for his senior year. For the 2004 season, he served as the head coach at Memorial Day High School in Savannah, Georgia, whom he led to a 1–9 record. He then rejoined the college coaching ranks, as he served as the quarterbacks coach at Jacksonville University for one year and a graduate assistant at UCF for two, before joining the Minnesota Vikings staff, where he remained for six years in various positions. Following a one-year stint at Toledo, he took a position as an offensive analyst at Arizona State, though he left part of the way through the season to join the Detroit Lions staff as an offensive line coach.

=== Memphis ===
After the conclusion of the 2015 season, he was hired at Memphis by Mike Norvell as an assistant. He remained in that position for two years before being tapped as the offensive line coach and run game coordinator in 2018. He was elevated to assistant head coach in 2019, and was named interim head coach when Norvell left to take the head coach position at Florida State. On December 13, Silverfield was promoted to head coach and made his college head coaching debut on December 28 against Penn State in the 2019 Cotton Bowl Classic. Although his overall record was successful compared to his predecessor, he was criticized for a 12–20 record against teams above .500 and no AAC title game appearances in any of his seasons at Memphis. In his final year at Memphis, he finished 4–4 in conference play.

=== Arkansas ===
Arkansas hired Silverfield on November 30 as its head coach following the 2025 season, succeeding Sam Pittman and interim head coach Bobby Petrino. Silverfield's 2025 Memphis team beat Arkansas in Memphis, 32–31, on September 20.

== Personal life ==
Silverfield is married to lobbyist, former University of Memphis VP of Governmental & Community Affairs (2021–24), and Memphis native Katie VanLandingham; they have twin daughters. Silverfield is from Jacksonville, Florida.

== Head coaching record ==
=== High school ===
Year	Team	Overall	Conference	Standing	Bowl/playoffs
Memorial Day High School (GISA Region 2–AA) (2004)
2004	Memorial Day	1–9	0–4	5th	
Memorial Day:		1–9	0–4		
Total:		1–9			

=== College ===
Year	Team	Overall	Conference	Standing	Bowl/playoffs	Coaches^{#}	AP^{°}
Memphis Tigers (American Athletic Conference / American Conference) (2019–2025)
2019	Memphis	0–1	0–0		L Cotton^{†}	17	17
2020	Memphis	8–3	5–3	T–3rd	W Montgomery		
2021	Memphis	6–6	3–5	T–7th	NC Hawaii		
2022	Memphis	7–6	3–5	T–8th	W First Responder		
2023	Memphis	10–3	6–2	4th	W Liberty		
2024	Memphis	11–2	6–2	T–3rd	W Frisco	23	24
2025	Memphis	8–4	4–4	T–6th	Gasparilla*		
Memphis:		50–25	27–21	*Left for Arkansas prior to bowl game			
Arkansas Razorbacks (Southeastern Conference) (2026–present)
2026	Arkansas	4–7	2–6				
Arkansas:		4–7	2–6				
Total:		54–32					
^{†}Indicates CFP / New Years' Six bowl.; ^{#}Rankings from final Coaches Poll.; ^{°}Rankings from final AP Poll.
