= Rocco Becht =

American football player (born 2003)

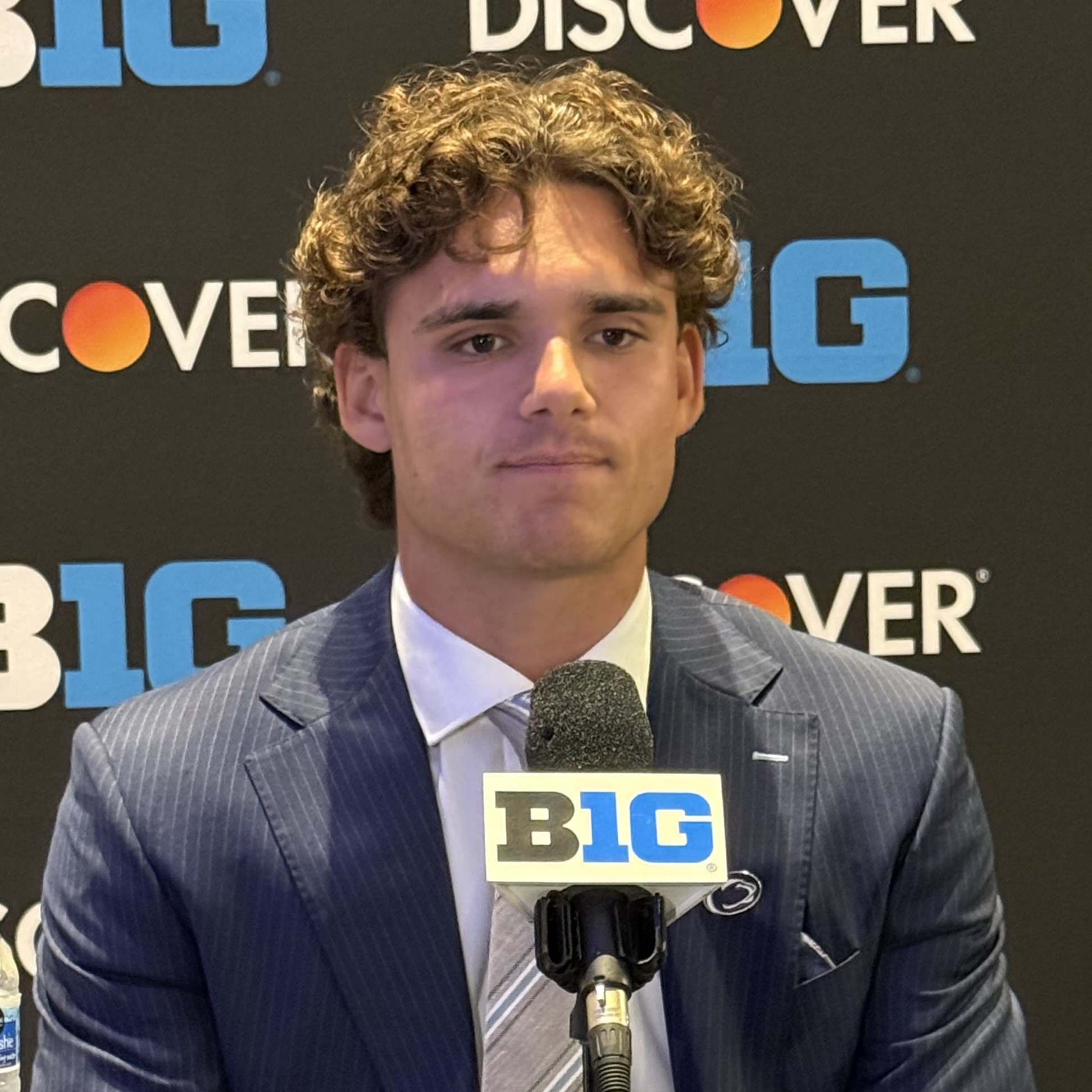
- Becht at 2026 Big Ten Media Day

No. 3 – Penn State Nittany Lions
- Position: Quarterback
- Class: Redshirt Senior

Personal information
- Born: November 12, 2003 (age 23); Wesley Chapel, Florida, U.S.
- Listed height: 6 ft 1 in (1.85 m)
- Listed weight: 210 lb (95 kg)

Career information
- High school: Wiregrass Ranch (Wesley Chapel, Florida)
- College: Iowa State (2022–2025); Penn State (2026–present)

Awards and highlights
- Big 12 Offensive Freshman of the Year (2023); 2024 Pop-Tarts Bowl MVP
- Stats at ESPN

Rocco Becht (/bɛkt/ BEKT; born November 12, 2003) is an American college football quarterback for the Penn State Nittany Lions. He previously played for the Iowa State Cyclones.

== Early life ==
Becht attended Wiregrass Ranch High School in Wesley Chapel, Florida. During his career, he passed for 5,343 yards and 65 touchdowns. He committed to Iowa State University to play college football.

== College career ==
=== Iowa State Cyclones ===
Becht with Iowa State in 2024.

Becht played in three games his first year at Iowa State in 2022, completing seven of 13 passes for 65 yards, and took a redshirt. He entered his redshirt freshman year in 2023 as the team's starting quarterback.

In his first start, he completed 10 of 13 passes for 113 yards with two touchdowns.In the 2023 season, he took over as the starting quarterback as a result of Hunter Dekkers leaving the university after a gambling probe. Becht guided the Cyclones to a 7–5 record (6–3 in the Big 12) before losing in the Liberty Bowl to Memphis, 36–26. He threw for 3,210 yards for 23 touchdowns and 8 interceptions that season.

In 2024, he sent his team to the Big 12 championship game at Arlington, Texas against first year Big 12 and surprising 10–2 Arizona State Sun Devils. Iowa State ended up losing that game, 45–19 where he threw for 214 yards, 2 touchdowns and one interception. In the Pop Tarts Bowl against the Miami Hurricanes on December 28, 2024, he ran into the end zone for a touchdown with 56 seconds left, winning a come from behind game 42–41, in Orlando, Florida. He also threw for 270 yards and 3 touchdowns in that game.

Following the 2025 season, Becht entered the transfer portal with 26 career wins as a starting quarterback, the most of any active FBS quarterback at that time.

=== Penn State Nittany Lions ===
On January 4, 2026, Becht committed to the Penn State Nittany Lions. He reunited with Matt Campbell, who had coached Becht at Iowa State. Becht made his Penn State debut in the 2026 season opener against Marshall, completing 13 of 18 passes for 271 yards and four touchdowns in a 45–0 victory.

=== Statistics ===
Year	Team	Games			Passing								Rushing			
Year	Team	GP	GS	Record	Cmp	Att	Pct	Yds	Y/A	TD	Int	Rtg	Att	Yds	Avg	TD
2022	Iowa State	3	0	—	7	15	46.7	65	4.3	0	1	69.7	1	2	2.0	0
2023	Iowa State	13	13	7−6	231	367	62.9	3,120	8.5	23	8	150.7	62	63	1.0	3
2024	Iowa State	14	14	11−3	271	456	59.4	3,505	7.7	25	9	138.1	98	318	3.2	8
2025	Iowa State	12	12	8−4	205	339	60.5	2,584	7.6	16	9	134.8	86	116	1.3	8
2026	Penn State	11	11	6−5	187	297	63.0	2,396	8.1	19	5	148.8	85	115	1.4	4
Career		53	50	32−18	901	1,474	61.1	11,670	7.9	83	32	141.9	332	614	1.8	23

== Personal life ==
His father, Anthony Becht, played tight end in the National Football League. His father is the current coach of the UFL Orlando Storm.
