= Jayden Higgins =

American football player (born 2002)

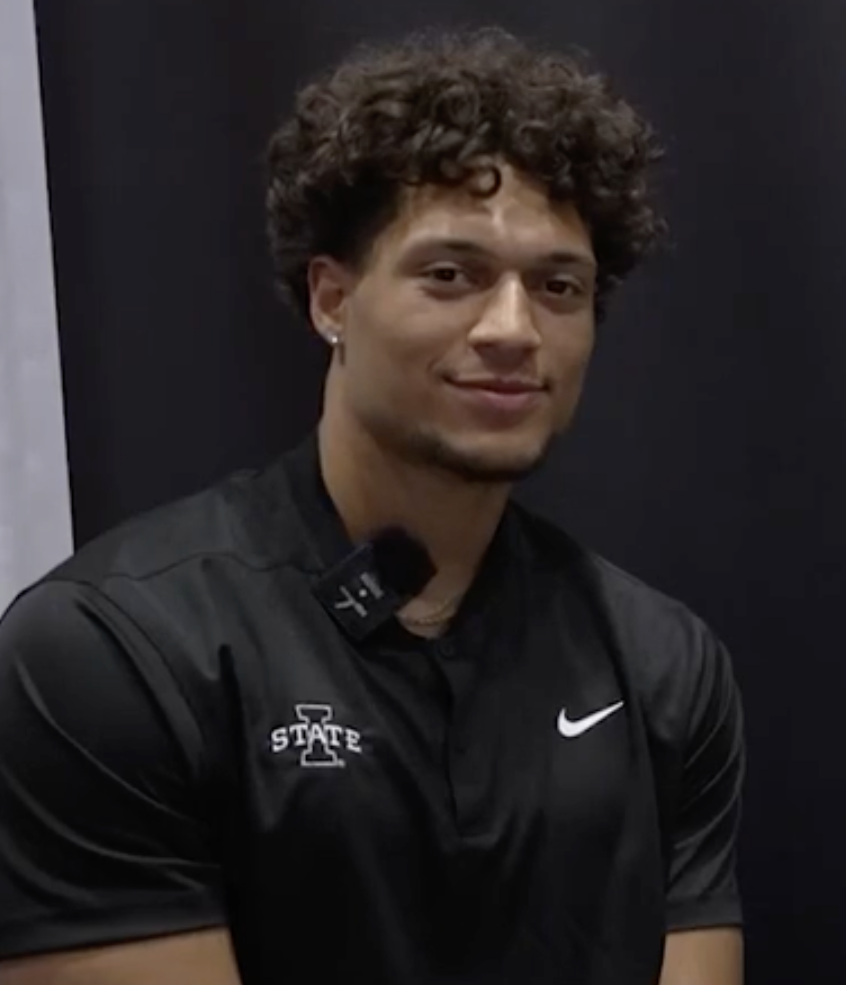
- Higgins in 2025

No. 81 – Houston Texans
- Position: Wide receiver
- Roster status: Injured reserve

Personal information
- Born: December 15, 2002 (age 23); Cobb County, Georgia, U.S.
- Listed height: 6 ft 4 in (1.93 m)
- Listed weight: 215 lb (98 kg)

Career information
- High school: Westminster Christian (Palmetto Bay, Florida)
- College: Eastern Kentucky (2021–2022); Iowa State (2023–2024)
- NFL draft: 2025: 2nd round, 34th overall pick

Career history
- Houston Texans (2025–present)

Awards and highlights
- Second-team All-Big 12 (2024)

Career NFL statistics as of 2025
- Receptions: 41
- Receiving yards: 525
- Receiving touchdowns: 6
- Stats at Pro Football Reference

Jayden William Higgins (born December 15, 2002) is an American professional football wide receiver for the Houston Texans of the National Football League (NFL). He played college football for the Eastern Kentucky Colonels and Iowa State Cyclones and was selected by the Texans in the second round of the 2025 NFL draft.

== Early life ==
Higins was born on December 15, 2002, in Cobb County, Georgia. He attended Westminster Christian School in Palmetto Bay, Florida. As a senior, he had 23 receptions for 430 receiving yards and five touchdowns in five games. Higgins also played basketball in high school.

== College career ==
Higgins played two seasons of college football for the Eastern Kentucky Colonels, recording 87 receptions for 1,151 yards and 13 touchdowns. After the 2022 season, he transferred to Iowa State University. In his first season at Iowa State in 2023, he started 12 of 13 games and had 53 receptions for 983 yards and six touchdowns. In the 2023 Liberty Bowl, he had a school Bowl record 214 receiving yards. In 2024 Higgins recorded 87 receptions for 1,183 yards and 9 touchdown, earning him AP Third Team All-American honors and Second Team All-Big 12.

== Professional career ==
Pre-draft measurables
Height	Weight	Arm length	Hand span	Wingspan	40-yard dash	10-yard split	20-yard split	20-yard shuttle	Three-cone drill	Vertical jump	Broad jump	Bench press
6 ft 4 1/8 in (1.93 m)	214 lb (97 kg)	33 1/8 in (0.84 m)	9 1/8 in (0.23 m)	6 ft 8 in (2.03 m)	4.47 s	1.53 s	2.62 s	4.28 s	7.05 s	39.0 in (0.99 m)	10 ft 8 in (3.25 m)	16 reps
All values from NFL Combine/Pro Day

=== 2025 ===
Higgins was drafted in the second round, selected with the 34th pick in the 2025 NFL draft by the Houston Texans.

In Week 4 against the Tennessee Titans, Higgins caught his first touchdown, a 24-yarder from C. J. Stroud in a 26–0 victory. He had 41 receptions for 525 yards and six touchdowns during his 2025 rookie season.

=== 2026 ===
On August 19, 2026, it was announced that Higgins had suffered a torn ACL the day before during a joint practice with the Las Vegas Raiders and ruled out for the season.

== Statistics ==
=== Regular season ===
Year	Team	Games		Receiving					Rushing					Fumbles	
Year	Team	GP	GS	Rec	Yds	Avg	Lng	TD	Att	Yds	Avg	Lng	TD	Fum	Lost
2025	HOU	17	10	41	525	12.8	75	6	0	0	0.0	0	0	0	0
Career		17	10	41	525	12.8	75	6	0	0	0.0	0	0	0	0
