= Jaylin Noel =

American football player (born 2002)

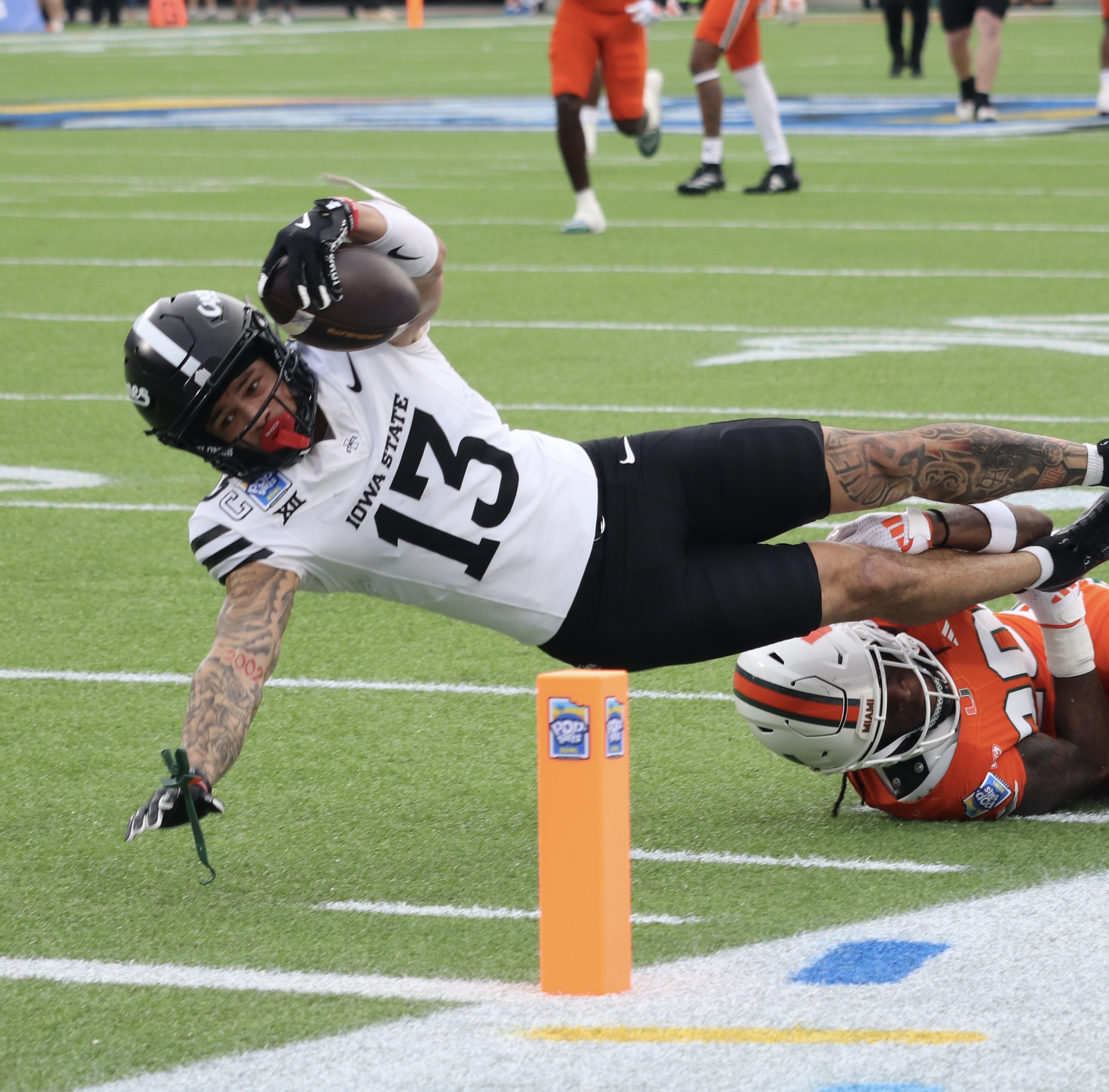
- Noel with the Iowa State Cyclones in 2024

No. 13 – Houston Texans
- Positions: Wide receiver, return specialist
- Roster status: Injured reserve

Personal information
- Born: September 4, 2002 (age 24); Kansas City, Kansas, U.S.
- Listed height: 5 ft 11 in (1.80 m)
- Listed weight: 201 lb (91 kg)

Career information
- High school: Park Hill (Kansas City, Missouri)
- College: Iowa State (2021–2024)
- NFL draft: 2025: 3rd round, 79th overall pick

Career history
- Houston Texans (2025–present)

Awards and highlights
- Big 12 Special Teams Player of the Year (2024); First-team All-Big 12 (2024); Second-team All-Big 12 (2023)

Career NFL statistics as of 2025
- Receptions: 26
- Receiving yards: 292
- Receiving touchdown: 2
- Return yards: 1,134
- Stats at Pro Football Reference

Jaylin Noel (born September 4, 2002) is an American professional football wide receiver and return specialist for the Houston Texans of the National Football League (NFL). He played college football for the Iowa State Cyclones and was selected by the Texans in the third round of the 2025 NFL draft.

== Early life ==
Noel was born on September 4, 2002 in Kansas City, Kansas. He started playing football in the second grade, where he was a quarterback, before making the switch to wide receiver two years later. He continued playing throughout middle school, afterwards, his mother, Deidre Cash, moved them to the Missouri side of Kansas City so Noel could play at Park Hill High School, a request she fulfilled after Noel begged her to do so. Noel attended Park Hill alongside fellow future NFL receiver Ronnie Bell in Kansas City, Missouri. As a junior, he recorded 42 receptions for 769 yards and nine touchdowns. A three-star recruit, Noel committed to play college football at Iowa State University, over offers from Nebraska, Kansas State, and Wisconsin.

== College career ==
In his first season, Noel tallied 39 catches for 269 yards. The following season against Texas, Noel scored his first career touchdown. In addition, against Baylor, Noel posted a then career-high 120 receiving yards. Noel finished his sophomore season with 60 receptions, 572 yards, and three touchdowns. His 60 receptions were tied for fourth most in the Big 12. As a junior, he recorded 66 receptions for 820 yards and seven touchdowns. Noel's senior year he was a standout for the Cyclones, tallying 80 receptions for 1,194 yards and 8 touchdowns while earning First Team All-Big 12 honors as a special teams player.

=== College Statistics ===
Year	Team	Games	Receiving			
Year	Team	GP	Rec	Yards	Avg	TD
2021	Iowa State	13	39	269	6.9	0
2022	Iowa State	12	60	572	9.5	3
2023	Iowa State	12	66	820	12.4	7
2024	Iowa State	14	80	1,194	14.9	8
Career		51	245	2,855	11.7	18

== Professional career ==
Pre-draft measurables
Height	Weight	Arm length	Hand span	Wingspan	40-yard dash	10-yard split	20-yard split	20-yard shuttle	Three-cone drill	Vertical jump	Broad jump	Bench press
5 ft 10 1/4 in (1.78 m)	194 lb (88 kg)	29 1/2 in (0.75 m)	8 3/4 in (0.22 m)	6 ft 1 3/4 in (1.87 m)	4.39 s	1.51 s	2.55 s	4.17 s	6.82 s	41.5 in (1.05 m)	11 ft 2 in (3.40 m)	23 reps
All values from NFL Combine

Noel was selected in the third round with the 79th pick of the 2025 NFL draft by the Houston Texans. Noel was drafted with the pick that the Texans acquired from the Washington Commanders in a trade for Laremy Tunsil. As a rookie, he had 26 receptions for 292 yards and two touchdowns.

=== Statistics ===
Year	Team	Games	Receiving			
Year	Team	GP	GS	Rec	Yards	TD
2025	Houston Texans	17	3	26	292	2
2026	Houston Texans	6	0	17	334	2
Career		23	3	43	626	4
