= Abu Sama =

American football player (born 2005)

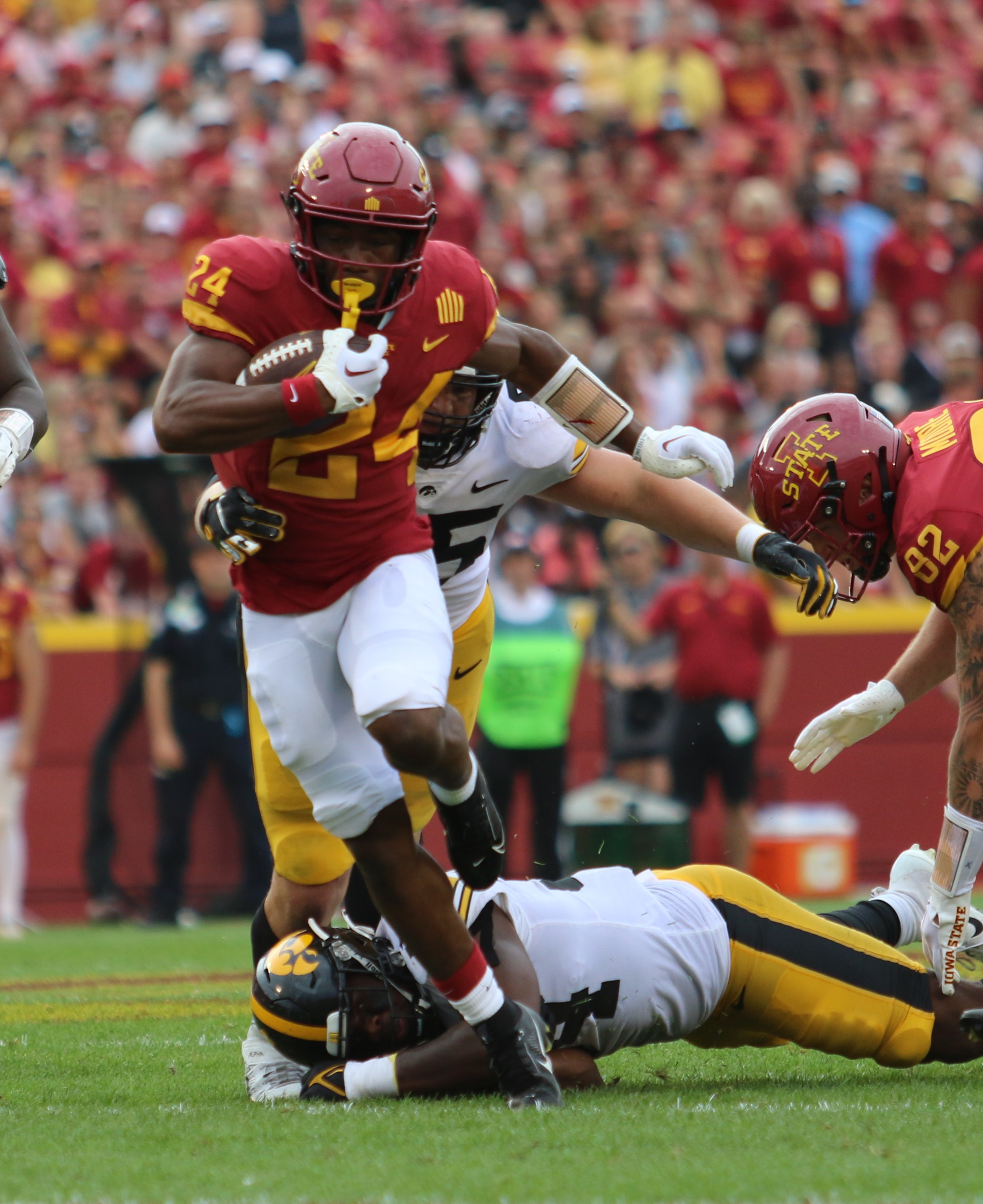
- Abu Sama runs the football against the Iowa Hawkeyes in 2025.

No. 3 – Wisconsin Badgers
- Position: Running back
- Class: Junior

Personal information
- Born: May 27, 2005 (age 21); Des Moines, Iowa, U.S.
- Listed height: 5 ft 11 in (1.80 m)
- Listed weight: 210 lb (95 kg)

Career information
- High school: Southeast Polk (Pleasant Hill, Iowa)
- College: Iowa State (2023–2025); Wisconsin (2026–present)
- Stats at ESPN

Abu Sama III (born May 27, 2005) is an American college football running back who plays for the Wisconsin Badgers. He previously played for the Iowa State Cyclones.

== Early life ==
Sama was born on May 27, 2005, in Des Moines, Iowa. His father grew up in Sierra Leone while his mother was born in Liberia; both had near-death experiences during the First and Second Liberian Civil Wars. He attended Southeast Polk High School in Pleasant Hill, Iowa, where he played football and ran track. He won state long jump championships in 2021, 2022, and 2023, and set the all-time state record in the event.

As a junior in football, Sama totaled 20 tackles while playing defense and on offense ran for 931 yards and 12 touchdowns as Southeast Polk won the state championship. The following season, he ran for 1,408 yards and 28 touchdowns, averaging more than 10 yards per touch. He concluded his high school career with 372 rushing yards and six touchdowns in the state title game, helping Southeast Polk win their second straight while setting state title game records in both statistical categories. Sama was named the Des Moines Register Player of the Year, the Gatorade Iowa Player of the Year, first-team all-state and was chosen to play in the US Army Bowl. Ranked a three-star recruit, he committed to play college football for the Iowa State Cyclones over other offers.

== College career ==
=== Iowa State ===
Sama saw immediate playing time as a true freshman at Iowa State in 2023; in 12 games, he totaled 84 rushes for 614 yards (a 7.3 average) and six touchdowns. Against 19th-ranked Kansas State in his first start, he ran for 276 yards and three touchdowns in an upset win, which was the fourth-most in a single game in school history and the most ever by a freshman. He was named the Big 12 Conference Offensive Player of the Week and the Big 12 Newcomer of the Week for his performance.

=== Wisconsin ===
On January 4, 2026, Sama transferred to Wisconsin.

=== Statistics ===
Year	Team	Games		Rushing				Receiving			
Year	Team	GP	GS	Att	Yds	Avg	TD	Rec	Yds	Avg	TD
2023	Iowa State	12	2	84	614	7.3	6	7	51	7.3	0
2024	Iowa State	14	6	124	587	4.7	2	8	58	7.3	0
2025	Iowa State	12	2	140	732	5.2	5	5	19	3.8	0
Career		38	10	348	1,933	5.6	13	20	128	6.4	0
