= Roc Taylor =

American football player (born 2002)

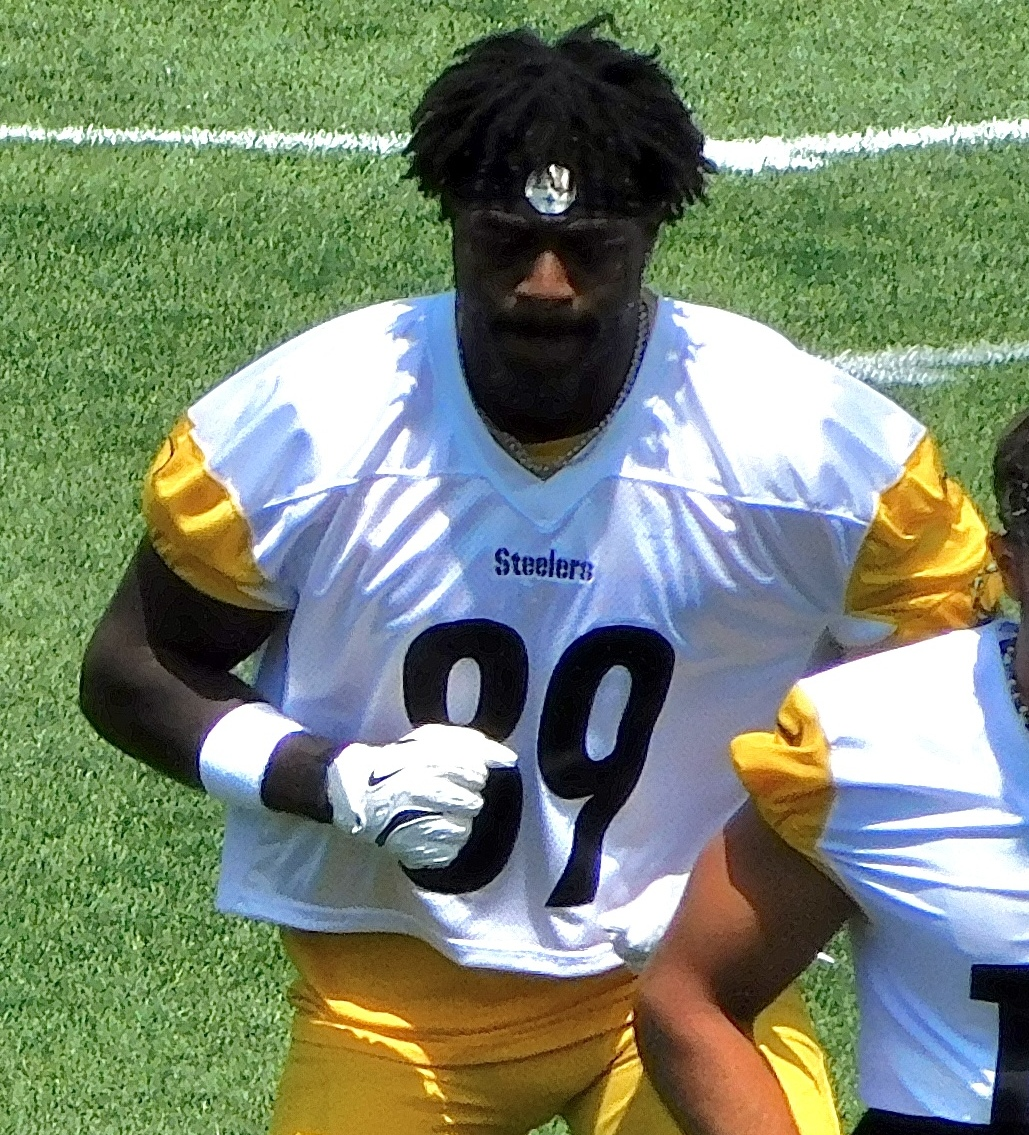
- Taylor with the Steelers in 2025

Profile
- Position: Wide receiver

Personal information
- Born: September 26, 2002 (age 24); Oxford, Alabama, U.S.
- Listed height: 6 ft 2 in (1.88 m)
- Listed weight: 213 lb (97 kg)

Career information
- High school: Oxford
- College: Memphis (2021–2024)
- NFL draft: 2025: undrafted

Career history
- Pittsburgh Steelers (2025)*; Columbus Aviators (2026); Ottawa Redblacks (2026)*; Carolina Panthers (2026)*
- * Offseason or practice squad member only

Awards and highlights
- First-team All-AAC (2024); Second-team All-AAC (2023)
- Stats at Pro Football Reference

Rokafewlloa Onasis "Roc" Taylor (born September 26, 2002) is an American professional football wide receiver. He played college football for the Memphis Tigers. He was selected by the Columbus Aviators during the 2026 UFL free agent draft.

== Early life ==
Taylor attended Oxford High School in Oxford, Alabama. As a junior he recorded 71 receptions for 1,306 yards and 17 touchdowns, earning first-team Class 6A all-state honors. As a senior Taylor tallied 52 receptions for 1,014 yards and 17 touchdowns. Coming out of high school, he was rated as a three-star recruit and committed to play college football for the Tennessee Volunteers. However after being committed for the Volunteers for over a year, after head coach Jeremy Pruitt was fired and new Tennessee coach Josh Heupel was brought in, Taylor's scholarship was pulled by the new coaching staff. He subsequently committed to play for the Memphis Tigers.

== College career ==
In his first two collegiate seasons in 2021 and 2022, Taylor appeared in 18 games where he notched 28 receptions for 342 yards and a touchdown. In the 2023 season opener, he tallied six receptions for 78 yards versus 2023 Bethune–Cookman. In week 4, Taylor recorded seven receptions for 143 yards against Missouri. In week 5, he recorded five receptions for 102 yards and a touchdown in a win over Boise State. Taylor finished the 2023 season with 69 catches for 1,083 yards and four touchdowns.

In week 9 of the 2024 season, Taylor caught the game-winning 24-yard touchdown to help beat Charlotte. In his final collegiate season in 2024, he notched 66 receptions for 950 yards and two touchdowns for the Tigers.

== Professional career ==
Pre-draft measurables
Height	Weight	Arm length	Hand span	Wingspan	40-yard dash	10-yard split	20-yard split	20-yard shuttle	Three-cone drill	Vertical jump	Broad jump
6 ft 1 7/8 in (1.88 m)	213 lb (97 kg)	32 1/4 in (0.82 m)	9 in (0.23 m)	6 ft 6 1/4 in (1.99 m)	4.49 s	1.53 s	2.61 s	4.31 s	7.10 s	30.5 in (0.77 m)	10 ft 2 in (3.10 m)
All values from NFL Combine/Pro Day

=== Pittsburgh Steelers ===
Taylor signed with the Pittsburgh Steelers as an undrafted free agent on April 26, 2025. He was released by the Steelers on August 18.

=== Columbus Aviators ===
On January 14, 2026, Taylor was selected by the Columbus Aviators of the United Football League (UFL). He was released by Columbus on April 7.

=== Ottawa Redblacks ===
On April 20, 2026, Taylor signed with the Ottawa Redblacks of the Canadian Football League (CFL). He was released by the Redblacks on May 24.

=== Carolina Panthers ===
On August 4, 2026, Taylor signed with the Carolina Panthers. He was waived by the Panthers on August 29.
