= Joseph Scates =

American football player (born 2000)

Profile
- Position: Wide receiver

Personal information
- Born: February 19, 2000 (age 26); Dayton, Ohio, U.S.
- Listed height: 6 ft 2 in (1.88 m)
- Listed weight: 210 lb (95 kg)

Career information
- High school: Dunbar (Dayton, Ohio)
- College: Iowa State (2018–2021); Memphis (2022–2023)
- NFL draft: 2024: undrafted

Career history
- Jacksonville Jaguars (2024)*; Memphis Showboats (2024–2025); BC Lions (2025)*
- * Offseason or practice squad member only

Joseph Scates (born February 19, 2000) is an American professional football wide receiver. He previously played college football for the Iowa State Cyclones and for the Memphis Tigers.

== Early life ==
Scates attended high school at Dunbar. In Scates' junior season, he hauled in 37 passes for 966 yards and 20 touchdowns. Coming out of high school, Scates was rated as a four star recruit, where he decided to commit to play college football for the Iowa State Cyclones.

== College career ==
=== Iowa State ===
In Scates' first two seasons in 2019 and 2020, he totaled eight receptions for 159 yards and three touchdowns. During the 2021 season, Scates hauled in eight receptions for 145 yards and a touchdown. After the conclusion of the 2021 season, Scates decided to enter his name into the NCAA transfer portal.

=== Memphis ===
Scates decided to transfer to play for the Memphis Tigers. In week two of the 2022 season, Scates recorded a catch for a 79-yard touchdown in a win over Navy. Scates finished the 2022 season bringing in 18 receptions for 412 yards and four touchdowns in his first season with Memphis. In week eleven of the 2023 season, Scates caught the game winning touchdown versus South Florida. In Scates final collegiate season in 2023 he played in 12 games hauling in 33 receptions for 414 yards and six touchdowns.

== Professional career ==
Pre-draft measurables
Height	Weight	Arm length	Hand span	40-yard dash	10-yard split	20-yard split	20-yard shuttle	Three-cone drill	Vertical jump	Broad jump
6 ft 2 1/3 in (1.89 m)	205 lb (93 kg)	31 7/8 in (0.81 m)	9 1/4 in (0.23 m)	4.55 s	1.65 s	2.58 s	4.43 s	7.07 s	31.5 in (0.80 m)	9 ft 10 in (3.00 m)
All values from Pro Day

=== Jacksonville Jaguars ===
Scates signed with the Jacksonville Jaguars as an undrafted free agent on April 30, 2024. He was waived on August 25.

=== Memphis Showboats ===
On December 6, 2024, Scates signed with the Memphis Showboats of the United Football League (UFL). He was released on March 20, 2025.

=== BC Lions ===
On April 15, 2025, Scates signed with the BC Lions of the Canadian Football League (CFL). He was released on May 11, 2025.
