= 2024 Arizona State Sun Devils football team =

American college football season

2024 Arizona State Sun Devils football

Big 12 champion

Big 12 Championship Game, W 45–19 vs. Iowa State

Peach Bowl (CFP Quarterfinal), L 31–39 ^{2OT} vs. Texas
- Conference: Big 12 Conference

Ranking
- Coaches: No. 7
- AP: No. 7
- Record: 11–3 (7–2 Big 12)
- Head coach: Kenny Dillingham (2nd season)
- Offensive coordinator: Marcus Arroyo (1st season)
- Offensive scheme: Pistol
- Defensive coordinator: Brian Ward (2nd season)
- Base defense: 4–3 or 4–2–5
- Home stadium: Mountain America Stadium

Uniform
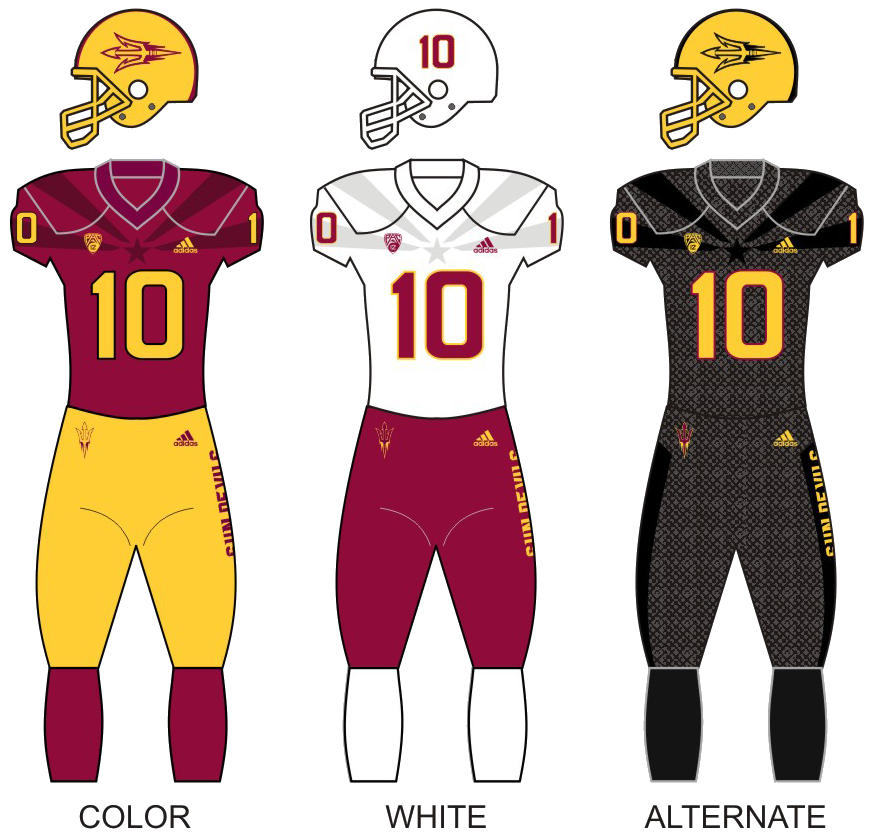

2024 Big 12 Conference football standings
	Conf.			Overall
Team	W		L	W		L
No. 7 Arizona State y$^	7	–	2	11	–	3
No. 15 Iowa State y	7	–	2	11	–	3
No. 13 BYU	7	–	2	11	–	2
No. 25 Colorado	7	–	2	9	–	4
Baylor	6	–	3	8	–	5
TCU	6	–	3	9	–	4
Texas Tech	6	–	3	8	–	5
Kansas State	5	–	4	9	–	4
West Virginia	5	–	4	6	–	7
Kansas	4	–	5	5	–	7
Cincinnati	3	–	6	5	–	7
Houston	3	–	6	4	–	8
Utah	2	–	7	5	–	7
UCF	2	–	7	4	–	8
Arizona	2	–	7	4	–	8
Oklahoma State	0	–	9	3	–	9
Championship: Arizona State 45, Iowa State 19
^ – College Football Playoff participant; $ – Conference champion; y – Championship game participant; Rankings from AP Poll

The 2024 Arizona State Sun Devils football team represented Arizona State University as a member of the Big 12 Conference during the 2024 NCAA Division I FBS football season. They were led by Kenny Dillingham in his second year as their head coach. The Sun Devils played their home games at Mountain America Stadium located in Tempe, Arizona. The season was the Sun Devils' first year in the Big 12.

Despite being projected to finish last in the Big 12, largely due to a 3–9 record the previous season, Arizona State completely flipped expectations by winning the conference championship against the Iowa State Cyclones, earning both their first trip to the College Football Playoff and their first conference title since 2007. The Sun Devils were picked to finish 16th (last) in the Big 12 preseason media poll. Coach Kenny Dillingham famously used this as motivation, tacking the poll results to the team's bulletin board.

== Preseason ==
=== Big 12 media poll ===
The preseason poll was released on July 2, 2024.

Big 12
Predicted finish	Team	Votes (1st place)
1	Utah	906 (20)
2	Kansas State	889 (19)
3	Oklahoma State	829 (14)
4	Kansas	772 (5)
5	Arizona	762 (3)
6	Iowa State	661
7	West Virginia	581
8	UCF	551
9	Texas Tech	532
10	TCU	436
11	Colorado	400
12	Baylor	268
13	BYU	215
14	Cincinnati	196
15	Houston	157
16	Arizona State	141

- First place votes in ()

== Schedule ==
Date	Time	Opponent	Rank	Site	TV	Result	Attendance
August 31, 2024	7:30 p.m.	Wyoming*		Mountain America Stadium; Tempe, AZ	FS1	W 48–7	48,108
September 7	7:30 p.m.	Mississippi State*		Mountain America Stadium; Tempe, AZ	ESPN	W 30–23	45,504
September 12	4:30 p.m.	at Texas State*		UFCU Stadium; San Marcos, TX	ESPN	W 31–28	25,187
September 21	12:30 p.m.	at Texas Tech		Jones AT&T Stadium; Lubbock, TX	FS1	L 22–30	58,795
October 5	5:00 p.m.	Kansas		Mountain America Stadium; Tempe, AZ	ESPN2	W 35–31	54,639
October 11	7:30 p.m.	No. 16 Utah		Mountain America Stadium; Tempe, AZ	ESPN	W 27–19	45,310
October 19	9:00 a.m.	at Cincinnati		Nippert Stadium; Cincinnati, OH	ESPN+	L 14–24	38,007
November 2	12:30 p.m.	at Oklahoma State		Boone Pickens Stadium; Stillwater, OK	FOX/FS2	W 42–21	52,202
November 9	5:00 p.m.	UCF		Mountain America Stadium; Tempe, AZ	ESPN2	W 35–31	44,940
November 16	5:00 p.m.	at No. 16 Kansas State		Bill Snyder Family Stadium; Manhattan, KS	ESPN	W 24–14	51,880
November 23	1:30 p.m.	No. 14 BYU^{†}	No. 21	Mountain America Stadium; Tempe, AZ	ESPN	W 28–23	55,400
November 30	1:30 p.m.	at Arizona	No. 16	Arizona Stadium; Tucson, AZ (Territorial Cup)	FOX	W 49–7	49,813
December 7	10:00 a.m.	vs. No. 16 Iowa State	No. 15	AT&T Stadium; Arlington, TX (Big 12 Championship Game)	ABC	W 45–19	55,889
January 1, 2025	11:00 a.m.	vs. (5) No. 3 Texas*	(4) No. 12	Mercedes-Benz Stadium; Atlanta, GA (Peach Bowl–CFP Quarterfinals)	ESPN	L 31–39 ^{2OT}	71,105
*Non-conference game; ^{†}Homecoming; Rankings from AP Poll (and CFP Rankings, after October 30) - Released prior to game; All times are in Mountain time; Source:

== Offseason ==
Positions key
Offense	Defense	Special teams
QB — Quarterback; RB — Running back; FB — Fullback; WR — Wide receiver; TE — Tight end; OL — Offensive lineman; T — Tackle; G — Guard; C — Center	DL — Defensive lineman; DT — Defensive tackle (Note: Includes nose tackle (NT)); DE — Defensive end; EDGE — Edge rusher; LB — Linebacker (Note: Includes middle linebacker (MLB/MIKE), weakside linebacker (WILL), strongside linebacker (SAM), off-ball linebacker, and outside linebacker (OLB)); DB — Defensive back; CB — Cornerback; S — Safety (Note: Includes free safety (FS) and strong safety (SS))	K — Kicker (Note: Also known as a placekicker (PK)); P — Punter; LS — Long snapper; RS — Return specialist (Note: Includes kickoff and punt returners)

=== Undrafted free agents ===
NFL team	Player	Position
Cleveland Browns	Chris Edmonds	S
Green Bay Packers	Messiah Swinson	TE
Seattle Seahawks*	Ro Torrence	CB

- signed with Chicago Bears after being waived

=== Transfers ===
==== Outgoing transfers ====
Arizona State Outgoing transfers
Name	Pos.	College transferred to
Jaden Rashada	QB	Georgia
Drew Pyne	QB	Missouri
Jacob Conover	QB	Utah State
Javen Jacobs	RB	New Mexico
George Hart III	RB	Western Kentucky
Elijhah Badger	WR	Florida
Andre Johnson	WR	Miami (OH)
Alonzo Brown	WR	TBD
Shawn Charles	WR	Robert Morris
Jalin Conyers	TE	Texas Tech
Bryce Pierre	TE	UCLA
Isaia Glass	OL	Oregon State
B. J. Green	DL	Colorado
Ashley Williams	DL	Louisiana
James Djonkam	DL	Eastern Michigan
Sam Benjamin	DL	San Diego State
Gharin Stansbury	DL	Jacksonville State
Will Shaffer	LB	Utah State
Dylan Devito	LB	TBD
Fritzny Niclasse	LB	TBD
Ed Woods	CB	Michigan State
Isaiah Johnson	CB	Marshall
RJ Regan	CB	Fresno State
Willie Harts	CB	TBD
Lenox Lawson	CB	TBD
Jean Boyd	CB	San Jose State
Jordan Clark	S	Notre Dame
Josiah Cox	S	New Mexico State
Shawn Russ	S	Bethune–Cookman (FCS)

† Note: Players with a dash in the new school column didn't land on a new team for the 2024 season.

==== Incoming transfers ====
Arizona State Incoming transfers
Name	Pos.	Previous school
Sam Leavitt	QB	Michigan State
Jeff Sims	QB	Nebraska
Christian Hunt	QB	Arkansas State
Raleek Brown	RB	USC
Alton McCaskill	RB	Colorado
Malik McClain	WR	Penn State
Markeston Douglas	TE	Florida State
Chamon Metayer	TE	Colorado
Cameron Harpole	TE	San Diego State
Jalen Klemm	OL	Washington
Josh Atkins	OL	Hawaii
Joey Su'a	OL	Arkansas
J'Mond Tapp	DL	Texas
Jacob Kongaika	DL	Arizona
Jeffrey Clark	DL	Louisville
Justin Wodtly	DL	Cincinnati
Roman Pitre	DL	Purdue
Zac Swanson	DL	Texas
J.P. Deeter	DL	Purdue
Keyshaun Elliott	LB	New Mexico State
Jordan Crook	LB	Arkansas
Zyrus Fiaseu	LB	San Diego State
Cole Martin	DB	Oregon
Kamari Wilson	DB	Florida
Myles Rowser	DB	New Mexico State
Javan Robinson	DB	Washington State
Laterrance Welch	DB	LSU
Parker Lewis	PK	Ohio State
Tyler Wigglesworth	LS	Northern Arizona (FCS)

=== Recruiting class ===
Arizona State signed 20 players in the class of 2024. The Sun Devils' recruiting class was ranked fifty-first by On3.com, forty-third by Rivals.com, and fifty-third by 247Sports.com. One signee was ranked in the ESPN 300 top prospect list.

College recruiting
Name	Hometown	School	Height	Weight	Commit date
Jason Brown; RB	Seattle, WA	O'Dea High School	5 ft 10 in (1.78 m)	200 lb (91 kg)	Dec 5, 2023
Jason Brown; RB	Recruit ratings: Rivals: 247Sports: On3: ESPN: (81)				
Jayden Fortier; TE	Tualatin, OR	Tualatin High School	6 ft 5 in (1.96 m)	220 lb (100 kg)	Jun 30, 2023
Jayden Fortier; TE	Recruit ratings: Rivals: 247Sports: On3: ESPN: (78)				
Rodney Bimage; CB	Dickinson, TX	Dickinson High School	6 ft 0 in (1.83 m)	170 lb (77 kg)	Jun 22, 2023
Rodney Bimage; CB	Recruit ratings: Rivals: 247Sports: On3: ESPN: (78)				
Zechariah Sample; ATH	Fulshear, TX	Jordan High School	5 ft 10 in (1.78 m)	165 lb (75 kg)	Mar 22, 2023
Zechariah Sample; ATH	Recruit ratings: Rivals: 247Sports: On3: ESPN: (78)				
Chris Johnson Jr. CB	Aledo, TX	Aledo High School	6 ft 0 in (1.83 m)	175 lb (79 kg)	Jul 4, 2023
Chris Johnson Jr. CB	Recruit ratings: Rivals: 247Sports: On3: ESPN: (78)				
Terrell Kim; OL	Medford, OR	North Medford High School	6 ft 3 in (1.91 m)	325 lb (147 kg)	Dec 17, 2023
Terrell Kim; OL	Recruit ratings: Rivals: 247Sports: On3: ESPN: (77)				
Plas Johnson; ATH	Scottsdale, AZ	Chaparral High School	6 ft 0 in (1.83 m)	165 lb (75 kg)	Jun 29, 2023
Plas Johnson; ATH	Recruit ratings: Rivals: 247Sports: On3: ESPN: (77)				
Kyan McDonald; CB	Seattle, WA	O'Dea High School	6 ft 0 in (1.83 m)	185 lb (84 kg)	Feb 5, 2024
Kyan McDonald; CB	Recruit ratings: Rivals: 247Sports: On3: ESPN: (77)				
Filiva'a Saluni; OL	Kahuku, HI	Kahuku High School	6 ft 5 in (1.96 m)	275 lb (125 kg)	Dec 4, 2023
Filiva'a Saluni; OL	Recruit ratings: Rivals: 247Sports: On3: ESPN: (77)				
Albert Smith; LB	Ponchatoula, LA	Ponchatoula High School	6 ft 1 in (1.85 m)	210 lb (95 kg)	May 21, 2023
Albert Smith; LB	Recruit ratings: Rivals: 247Sports: On3: ESPN: (76)				
Tony-Louis Nkuba; CB	Lewisville, TX	Lewisville High School	6 ft 1 in (1.85 m)	170 lb (77 kg)	May 17, 2023
Tony-Louis Nkuba; CB	Recruit ratings: Rivals: 247Sports: On3: ESPN: (76)				
Cullen Charles; ATH	Saint Martinville, LA	St. Martinville Senior High School	5 ft 11 in (1.80 m)	175 lb (79 kg)	Jun 10, 2023
Cullen Charles; ATH	Recruit ratings: Rivals: 247Sports: On3: ESPN: (76)				
Salesi Manu; LB	Reno, NV	Bishop Manogue Catholic High School	6 ft 2 in (1.88 m)	210 lb (95 kg)	Dec 9, 2023
Salesi Manu; LB	Recruit ratings: Rivals: 247Sports: On3: ESPN: (76)				
Champ Westbrooks; OL	Los Angeles, CA	Loyola High School	6 ft 4 in (1.93 m)	270 lb (120 kg)	Jun 17, 2023
Champ Westbrooks; OL	Recruit ratings: Rivals: 247Sports: On3: ESPN: (75)				
Martell Hughes; S	San Diego, CA	James Madison High School	6 ft 2 in (1.88 m)	185 lb (84 kg)	Jul 4, 2023
Martell Hughes; S	Recruit ratings: Rivals: 247Sports: On3: ESPN: (75)				
James Giggey; DL	Prescott Valley, AZ	Bradshaw Mountain High School	6 ft 3 in (1.91 m)	240 lb (110 kg)	Dec 2, 2022
James Giggey; DL	Recruit ratings: Rivals: 247Sports: On3: ESPN: (74)				
Semisi Tonga; OL	Salt Lake City, UT	West High School	6 ft 4 in (1.93 m)	310 lb (140 kg)	Dec 12, 2023
Semisi Tonga; OL	Recruit ratings: Rivals: 247Sports: On3: ESPN: (74)				
Ramar Williams; DL	Mesa, AZ	Eastmark High School	6 ft 3 in (1.91 m)	250 lb (110 kg)	Jun 17, 2023
Ramar Williams; DL	Recruit ratings: Rivals: 247Sports: On3: ESPN: (73)				
Kanyon Floyd; K	Scottsdale, AZ	Horizon High School	5 ft 11 in (1.80 m)	165 lb (75 kg)	May 21, 2023
Kanyon Floyd; K	Recruit ratings: Rivals: 247Sports: On3: ESPN: (72)				
Nikko Klemm; CB	Gardena, CA	Junípero Serra High School	5 ft 11 in (1.80 m)	180 lb (82 kg)	Feb 25, 2024
Nikko Klemm; CB	Recruit ratings: Rivals: 247Sports: On3: ESPN: (NR)				
Overall recruit ranking:
‡ Refers to 40-yard dash; Note: In many cases, Scout, Rivals, 247Sports, On3, and ESPN may conflict in their listings of height, weight and 40 time.; In these cases, the average was taken. ESPN grades are on a 100-point scale.; Sources: "Arizona State Football Commitment List". Rivals.; "2024 Player Commitments – Arizona State". ESPN.; "2024 Team Ranking". Rivals.com.; "2024 Arizona State Sun Devils football team". 247Sports.

2024 overall class rankings

Website	National rank	Conference rank	5 star recruits	4 star recruits	3 star recruits	2 star recruits	1 star recruits	No star ranking
ESPN	–	–	—	1	19	0	0	0
On3 Recruits	#51	#9	—	1	19	0	0	0
Rivals	#53	#4	–	2	14	1	0	0
247 Sports	#43	#7	—	2	18	0	0	0

== Personnel ==
=== Roster ===
2024 Arizona State Sun Devils football team roster
Players
Coaches
Offense

Pos.	#	Name	Class
WR	0	Jordyn Tyson	RSo
WR	1	Xavier Guillory	RSr
RB	2	Kyson Brown	So
RB	3	Raleek Brown	RSo
RB	4	Cam Skattebo	Sr
WR	5	Melquan Stovall	GS
QB	6	Jeff Sims	Sr
TE	7	Chamon Metayer	RJr
WR	8	Jake Smith	RSr
WR	9	Troy Omeire	RSr
QB	10	Sam Leavitt	RFr
WR	12	Malik McClain	Sr
QB	13	Christian Hunt	RFr
QB	14	Tyler Laskaris	Fr
WR	15	Max Ware	RSo
QB	16	Trenton Bourguet	RSr
WR	17	Kaleb Black	RFr
TE	18	Markeston Douglas	RJr
QB	19	Navi Bruzon	Fr
RB	20	Alton McCaskill	RJr
RB	22	Jason Brown Jr.	Fr
TE	24	Coleson Arends	RFr
RB	25	DeCarlos Brooks	RSr
WR	32	Deric English	RFr
TE	44	Sinjin Schmitt	RFr
TE	45	James Giggey	Fr
OL	54	Joey Su'a	RFr
OL	55	Cade Briggs	RSr
OL	56	Jalen Klemm	RSo
OL	57	Brandon Lloyd	Sr
OL	58	Max Iheanachor	Sr
OL	59	Semisi Tonga	Fr
OL	60	Luis Cordova	Fr
OL	61	Carson Keim	Fr
OL	62	Ben Coleman	GS
OL	63	Sirri Kandiyeli	RFr
OL	65	Josh Atkins	RJr
OL	67	Keona Peat	RFr
OL	68	Connor Cameron	Fr
OL	70	Emmit Bohle	GS
OL	71	Makua Pule	RFr
OL	72	Kaden Haeckel	Fr
OL	73	Terrell Kim	Fr
OL	74	Sean Na'a	So
OL	75	Bram Walden	RJr
OL	76	Champ Westbrooks	Fr
OL	77	Kyle Scott	RJr
OL	78	Colby Garvin	RJr
OL	79	Leif Fautanu	RSr
TE	80	Jayden Fortier	Fr
WR	81	Jamaal Young II	RFr
WR	82	Armon Collins	RJr
WR	83	Derek Eusebio	RFr
WR	84	Korbin Hendrix	RFr
TE	85	Cameron Harpole	RJr
WR	86	Justice Spann	Fr
WR	87	Zechariah Sample	Fr
WR	88	Coben Bourguet	RJr

Defense

Pos.	#	Name	Class
DB	0	Cole Martin	So
DB	1	Keith Abney II	So
DB	2	Xavion Alford	RJr
DB	3	Laterrence Welch	Jr
DB	4	Myles "Ghost" Rowser	Jr
DL	5	Jeff Clark	GS
DB	6	Macen Williams	RSr
DB	7	Shamari Simmons	GS
LB	8	Jordan Crook	Jr
DB	9	Montana Warren	RFr
DL	10	Clayton Smith	RJr
DB	12	Javan Robinson	RSo
DL	13	Roman Pitre	RSo
DL	14	J'Mond Tapp	RSo
DL	15	Elijah O'Neal	Sr
DB	16	Chris Johnson II	Fr
DB	17	Rodney Bimage Jr.	Fr
LB	18	Martell Hughes	Fr
DB	19	Adama Fall	RJr
DB	20	Kamari Wilson	RSo
DB	21	Tony-Louis Nkuba	Fr
LB	22	Caleb McCullough	RSr
DB	23	Keontez Bradley	RFr
LB	24	Tate Romney	RSo
DB	25	Jack Bal	RFr
DB	28	Joseph McGinnis II	RSo
DB	29	Plas Johnson	Fr
LB	30	Zyrus Fiaseu	RJr
DB	31	Nikko Klemm	Fr
DL	32	Prince Dorbah	RSr
LB	34	Myles Amey	RSo
DL	36	Salesi Manu	Fr
DB	38	Kyan McDonald	Fr
DB	39	Kayman Rawls	Jr
DB	41	Ja'Mori Williams	Fr
LB	43	Krew Jackson	RJr
LB	44	Keyshaun Elliott	Jr
LB	45	K'Vion Thunderbird	RFr
DB	46	Tommy Romano	RFr
LB	49	Prayer Young-Blackgoat	Fr
DL	50	Chance Symons	RSo
DL	52	Ian Shewell	RJr
DE	53	Albert Smith III	Fr
DL	55	Ramar Williams	Fr
DL	88	Harold Brooks III	RSr
DL	90	Kyran Bourda	RFr
DL	91	J. P. Deeter	RSo
DL	92	Zac Swanson	RSo
DL	93	Tristan Monday	RSo
DL	94	Landen Thomas	RFr
DL	95	Justin Wodtly	RJr
DL	96	Anthonie Cooper	GS
DL	97	Blazen Lono-Wong	RSo
DL	98	Jacob Rich Kongaika	Jr
DL	99	C. J. Fite	So

Special teams

Pos.	#	Name	Class
K	29	Parker Lewis	GS
K, P	30	Ian Hershey	RSo
P	31	Kanyon Floyd	Fr
P	47	Race Mahlum	RSr
K	50	Carston Kieffer	RFr
LS	51	Cole Marszalek	RFr
LS	64	Tyler Wigglesworth	RSo

Head coach

- Kenny Dillingham

Coordinators/assistant coaches

- Matt Butterfield – Chief of staff, senior coaching advisor, pro liaison
- Charlie Ragle – Assistant head coach, special teams coordinator
- Brian Ward – Defensive coordinator
- Marcus Arroyo – Offensive coordinator, quarterbacks
- Shaun Aguano – Assistant coach, running backs
- Hines Ward – Assistant coach, wide receivers
- Saga Tuitele – Assistant coach, offensive line
- A. J. Cooper – Assistant coach, linebackers, run game coordinator
- Bryan Carrington – Assistant coach, cornerbacks
- Jason Mohns – Assistant coach, tight ends
- Diron Reynolds – Assistant coach, defensive line

Legend

- (C) Team captain
- (S) Suspended
- (I) Ineligible
- Injured
- Redshirt

Roster
Last update: 2024-08-12

=== Support staff ===
- Bryan McGinnis – Assistant Athletic Director for Football Operations
- Jason Cvercko – Assistant Athletic Director, Player Personnel and Recruiting

== Game summaries ==
=== vs Wyoming ===
Wyoming Cowboys (0–0) vs Arizona State Sun Devils (0–0) – Game summary

Quarter	1	2	3	4	Total
Cowboys	0	0	0	7	7
Sun Devils	17	10	21	0	48

at Mountain America Stadium • Tempe, AZ

- Date: August 31, 2024
- Game time: 7:30 p.m.
- Game weather: Cloudy, 99 °F (37 °C)
- Game attendance: 48,108
- Referee: Henry Johns
- TV announcers (FS1): Chris Myers (play-by-play) and Petros Papadakis (analyst)

Game information

First quarter

- (14:19) ASU – Zyrus Fiaseu 29-yard interception return, Ian Hershey kick (Arizona State 7–0)
- (6:19) ASU – Ian Hershey 29-yard field goal (Drive: 7 plays, 30 yards, 3:42; Arizona State 10–0)
- (0:00) ASU – DeCarlos Brooks 8-yard run, Ian Hershey kick (Drive: 10 plays, 72 yards, 5:00; Arizona State 17–0)

Second quarter

- (9:47) ASU – Cam Skattebo 3-yard run, Ian Hershey kick (Drive: 7 plays, 43 yards, 3:14; Arizona State 24–0)
- (4:28) ASU – Ian Hershey 24-yard field goal (Drive: 8 plays, 52 yards, 3:23; Arizona State 27–0)

Third quarter

- (11:03) ASU – Chamon Metayer 25-yard pass from Sam Leavitt, Ian Hershey kick (Drive: 9 plays, 75 yards, 3:57; Arizona State 34–0)
- (6:07) ASU – Justin Wodtly 6-yard fumble return, Ian Hershey kick (Arizona State 41–0)
- (3:34) ASU – Kyson Brown 68-yard pass from Sam Leavitt, Ian Hershey kick (Drive: 3 plays, 67 yards, 1:46; Arizona State 48–0)

Fourth quarter

- (0:02) WYO – Chris Durr 3-yard pass from Kaden Anderson, John Hoyland kick (Drive: 9 plays, 74 yards, 2:14; Arizona State 48–7)

Statistics	WYO	ASU
First downs	8	27
Total yards	118	499
Rushing yards	32–40	49–241
Passing yards	78	258
Passing: Comp–Att–Int	10–20–2	14–22–0
Time of possession	22:56	37:04

Team	Category	Player	Statistics
Wyoming	Passing	Evan Svoboda	6/15, 42 yards, 2 INT
Wyoming	Rushing	D.J. Jones	17 carries, 43 yards
Wyoming	Receiving	Tyler King	1 reception, 23 yards
Arizona State	Passing	Sam Leavitt	14/22, 258 yards, 2 TD
Arizona State	Rushing	Cam Skattebo	11 carries, 49 yards, TD
Arizona State	Receiving	Kyson Brown	2 receptions, 73 yards, TD

=== vs Mississippi State ===
Mississippi State Bulldogs (1–0) vs Arizona State Sun Devils (1–0) – Game summary

Quarter	1	2	3	4	Total
Bulldogs	0	3	7	13	23
Sun Devils	10	17	3	0	30

at Mountain America Stadium • Tempe, AZ

- Date: September 7, 2024
- Game time: 7:30 p.m.
- Game weather: 101 °F (38 °C)
- Game attendance: 45,504
- Referee: Steve Marlowe
- TV announcers (ESPN): Mark Jones (play-by-play), Roddy Jones (analyst), and Quint Kessenich (sideline)

Game information

First quarter

- ASU – Sam Leavitt 7-yard run (Ian Hershey kick), 9:31. Sun Devils 7–0. Drive: 10 plays, 79 yards, 4:11.
- ASU – Ian Hershey 27-yard field goal, 2:00. Sun Devils 10–0. Drive: 12 plays, 60 yards, 6:17.

Second quarter

- MSST – Kyle Ferrie 32-yard field goal, 13:16. Sun Devils 10–3. Drive: 12 plays, 71 yards, 3:44.
- ASU – Ian Hershey 47-yard field goal, 9:33. Sun Devils 13–3. Drive: 9 plays, 45 yards, 3:43.
- ASU – C. J. Fite 1-yard fumble return (Ian Hershey kick), 8:23. Sun Devils 20–3.
- ASU – Sam Leavitt 1-yard run (Ian Hershey kick), 0:34. Sun Devils 27–3. Drive: 11 plays, 68 yards, 5:00.

Third quarter

- ASU – Ian Hershey 46-yard field goal, 6:33. Sun Devils 30–3. Drive: 14 plays, 46 yards, 8:27.
- MSST – Keyvone Lee 6-yard run (Kyle Ferrie kick), 2:29. Sun Devils 30–10. Drive: 12 plays, 75 yards, 4:04.

Fourth quarter

- MSST – Davon Booth 15-yard pass from Blake Shapen (kick failed), 13:09. Sun Devils 30–16. Drive: 8 plays, 50 yards, 2:13.
- MSST – Kevin Coleman Jr. 80-yard pass from Blake Shapen (Kyle Ferrie kick), 5:27. Sun Devils 30–23. Drive: 1 play, 80 yards, 0:13.

Statistics	MSST	ASU
First downs	18	26
Total yards	292	415
Rushing yards	24	346
Passing yards	268	69
Passing: Comp–Att–Int	18–28–0	10–20–0
Time of possession	19:47	40:13

Team	Category	Player	Statistics
Mississippi State	Passing	Blake Shapen	18–28, 268 yards, 2 TD
Mississippi State	Rushing	Keyvone Lee	9 carries, 35 yards, TD
Mississippi State	Receiving	Kevin Coleman Jr.	4 receptions, 103 yards, TD
Arizona State	Passing	Sam Leavitt	10–20, 69 yards
Arizona State	Rushing	Cam Skattebo	33 carries, 262 yards
Arizona State	Receiving	Cam Skattebo	3 receptions, 35 yards

=== at Texas State ===
Arizona State Sun Devils (2–0) at Texas State Bobcats (2–0) – Game summary

Quarter	1	2	3	4	Total
Sun Devils	7	14	7	3	31
Bobcats	7	14	7	0	28

at Bobcat Stadium • San Marcos, TX

- Date: September 12, 2024
- Game time: 4:30 p.m.
- Game weather: Cloudy, 92 °F (33 °C)
- Game attendance: 25,187
- Referee: Stephen Baron
- TV announcers (ESPN): Matt Barrie (play-by-play), Dan Mullen (analyst), and Harry Lyles Jr. (sideline)

Game information

First quarter

- (8:37) ASU – Cam Skattebo 1-yard run, Ian Hershey kick (Drive: 10 plays, 69 yards, 4:46; Arizona State 7–0)
- (1:10) TXST – Chris Dawn Jr. 5-yard pass from Jordan McCloud, Mason Shipley kick (Drive: 14 plays, 75 yards, 7:27; Tied 7–7)

Second quarter

- (8:31) TXST – Jaden Williams 6-yard pass from Jordan McCloud, Mason Shipley kick (Drive: 15 plays, 64 yards, 6:47; Texas State 14–7)
- (5:16) TXST – Beau Sparks 19-yard pass from Jordan McCloud, Mason Shipley kick (Drive: 3 plays, 50 yards, 0:53; Texas State 21–7)
- (3:46) ASU – Jordyn Tyson 52-yard pass from Sam Leavitt, Ian Hershey kick (Drive: 4 plays, 75 yards, 1:30; Texas State 21–14)
- (0:06) ASU – Sam Leavitt 7-yard run, Ian Hershey kick (Drive: 11 plays, 57 yards, 2:32; Tied 21–21)

Third quarter

- (4:18) TXST – Jaden Williams 44-yard pass from Jordan McCloud, Mason Shipley kick (Drive: 6 plays, 66 yards, 2:02; Texas State 28–21)
- (2:17) ASU – Cam Skattebo 2-yard run, Ian Hershey kick (Drive: 7 plays, 75 yards, 2:01; Tied 28–28)

Fourth quarter

- (6:29) ASU – Ian Hershey 22-yard field goal (Drive: 5 plays, 18 yards, 2:35; Arizona State 31–28)

Statistics	ASU	TXST
First downs	20	21
Total yards	347	397
Rushing yards	101	132
Passing yards	246	265
Passing: Comp–Att–Int	19–30–1	28–43–1
Time of possession	38:17	31:56

Team	Category	Player	Statistics
Arizona State	Passing	Sam Leavitt	19/30, 246 yards, TD, INT
Arizona State	Rushing	Cam Skattebo	24 carries, 62 yards, 2 TDs
Arizona State	Receiving	Jordyn Tyson	6 receptions, 120 yards, TD
Texas State	Passing	Jordan McCloud	28/43, 265 yards, 4 TDs, INT
Texas State	Rushing	Ismail Mahdi	14 carries, 68 yards,
Texas State	Receiving	Jaden Williams	4 receptions, 75 yards, 2 TDs

=== at Texas Tech ===
Arizona State Sun Devils (3–0) at Texas Tech Red Raiders (2–1) – Game summary

Quarter	1	2	3	4	Total
Sun Devils	0	10	6	6	22
Red Raiders	14	3	7	6	30

at Jones AT&T Stadium • Lubbock, TX

- Date: September 21, 2024
- Game time: 12:30 p.m.
- Game weather: Sunny, 87 °F (31 °C)
- Game attendance: 58,795
- Referee: Henry Johns
- TV announcers (FS1): Eric Collins (play-by-play) and Spencer Tillman (analyst)

Game information

First quarter

- TTU – Johncarlos Miller II 5-yard pass from Behren Morton (Gino Garcia kick), 11:22. Red Raiders 7–0. Drive: 10 plays, 65 yards, 3:38.
- TTU – Josh Kelly 20-yard pass from Behren Morton (Reese Burkhardt kick), 7:42. Red Raiders 14–0. Drive: 6 plays, 38 yards, 2:11.

Second quarter

- ASU – Ian Hershey 34-yard field goal, 13:10. Red Raiders 14–3. Drive: 8 plays, 31 yards, 2:40.
- ASU – Sam Leavitt 1-yard run (Ian Hershey kick), 1:33. Red Raiders 14–10. Drive: 9 plays, 79 yards, 4:01.
- TTU – Gino Garcia 30-yard field goal, 0:08. Red Raiders 17–10. Drive: 8 plays, 64 yards, 1:16.

Third quarter

- TTU – Jalin Conyers 3-yard run (Gino Garcia kick), 8:14. Red Raiders 24–10. Drive: 12 plays, 68 yards, 5:55.
- ASU – Cam Skattebo 3-yard run (kick blocked), 3:39. Red Raiders 24–16. Drive: 3 plays, 80 yards, 1:09.

Fourth quarter

- TTU – Reese Burkhardt 40-yard field goal, 13:36. Red Raiders 27–16. Drive: 12 plays, 43 yards, 5:03.
- TTU – Gino Garcia 39-yard field goal, 6:54. Red Raiders 30–16. Drive: 11 plays, 43 yards, 5:45.
- ASU – Cam Skattebo 3-yard run (pass failed), 1:39. Red Raiders 30–22. Drive: 10 plays, 67 yards, 2:13.

Statistics	ASU	TTU
First downs	22	24
Total yards	376	334
Rushing yards	94	133
Passing yards	282	201
Passing: Comp–Att–Int	22–38–1	24–44–0
Time of possession	25:49	34:11

Team	Category	Player	Statistics
Arizona State	Passing	Sam Leavitt	22/38, 282 yards, INT
Arizona State	Rushing	Cam Skattebo	18 carries, 60 yards, 2 TD
Arizona State	Receiving	Cam Skattebo	6 receptions, 117 yards
Texas Tech	Passing	Behren Morton	24/44, 201 yards, 2 TD
Texas Tech	Rushing	Tahj Brooks	27 carries, 117 yards
Texas Tech	Receiving	Josh Kelly	10 receptions, 89 yards, TD

=== vs Kansas ===
Kansas Jayhawks (1–4) vs Arizona State Sun Devils (3–1) – Game summary

Quarter	1	2	3	4	Total
Jayhawks	7	7	3	14	31
Sun Devils	7	7	0	21	35

at Mountain America Stadium • Tempe, AZ

- Date: October 5, 2024
- Game time: 5:00 p.m.
- Game weather: Sunny, 107 °F (42 °C)
- Game attendance: 54,639
- Referee: Marvel July
- TV announcers (ESPN2): Brian Custer (play-by-play), Rod Gilmore (analyst), and Lauren Sisler (sideline)

Game information

First quarter

- ASU – Xavier Guillory 28-yard pass from Sam Leavitt (Ian Hershey kick), 11:48. Sun Devils 7–0. Drive: 7 plays, 75 yards, 3:12.
- KAN – Jalon Daniels 22-yard run (Luke Hosford kick), 6:30. Tied 7–7. Drive: 10 plays, 75 yards, 5:18.

Second quarter

- KAN – Quentin Skinner 30-yard pass from Jalon Daniels (Luke Hosford kick), 11:50. Jayhawks 14–7. Drive: 10 plays, 85 yards, 5:03.
- ASU – Chamon Metayer 20-yard pass from Sam Leavitt (Carston Kieffer kick), 1:33. Tied 14–14. Drive: 4 plays, 58 yards, 0:52.

Third quarter

- KAN – Tabor Allen 20-yard field goal, 10:04. Jayhawks 17–14. Drive: 13 plays, 73 yards, 4:56.

Fourth quarter

- ASU – Cam Skattebo 1-yard run (Carston Kieffer kick), 14:56. Sun Devils 21–17. Drive: 10 plays, 52 yards, 5:21.
- KAN – Devin Neal 31-yard run (Luke Hosford kick), 10:49. Jayhawks 24–21. Drive: 8 plays, 75 yards, 4:07.
- ASU – Jordyn Tyson 31-yard pass from Sam Leavitt (Carston Kieffer kick), 6:19. Sun Devils 28–24. Drive: 10 plays, 75 yards, 4:30.
- KAN – Quentin Skinner 34-yard pass from Jalon Daniels (Luke Hosford kick), 2:04. Jayhawks 31–28. Drive: 7 plays, 69 yards, 4:09.
- ASU – Jordyn Tyson 3-yard pass from Sam Leavitt (Carston Kieffer kick), 0:16. Sun Devils 35–31. Drive: 8 plays, 75 yards, 1:48.

Statistics	KU	ASU
First downs	23	28
Total yards	411	485
Rushing yards	151	313
Passing yards	260	172
Passing: Comp–Att–Int	18–31–0	15–25–1
Time of possession	30:41	29:19

Team	Category	Player	Statistics
Kansas	Passing	Jalon Daniels	18/31, 260 yards, 2 TD
Kansas	Rushing	Devin Neal	14 carries, 71 yards, TD
Kansas	Receiving	Quentin Skinner	6 receptions, 130 yards, 2 TD
Arizona State	Passing	Sam Leavitt	14/24, 157 yards, 4 TD, INT
Arizona State	Rushing	Cam Skattebo	25 carries, 186 yards, TD
Arizona State	Receiving	Jordyn Tyson	6 receptions, 76 yards, 2 TD

=== vs No. 16 Utah ===
No. 16 Utah Utes (4–1) vs Arizona State Sun Devils (4–1) – Game summary

Quarter	1	2	3	4	Total
No. 16 Utes	6	3	7	3	19
Sun Devils	6	7	7	7	27

at Mountain America Stadium • Tempe, AZ

- Date: October 11, 2024
- Game time: 7:30 p.m.
- Game weather: Sunny • Temperature: 91 °F (33 °C) • Wind: NW at 4 miles per hour (6.4 km/h)
- Game attendance: 45,310
- Referee: Henry Johns
- TV announcers (ESPN): Anish Shroff (play-by-play), Andre Ware (analyst), and Paul Carcaterra (sideline)

Game information

First quarter

- (9:57) UTAH – Cole Becker 48-yard field goal (Drive: 12 plays, 46 yards, 5:03; Utah 3–0)
- (7:12) UTAH – Cole Becker 40-yard field goal (Drive: 4 plays, 6 yards, 1:32; Utah 6–0)
- (2:04) ASU – Jordyn Tyson 26-yard pass from Sam Leavitt (Drive: 11 plays, 81 yards, 5:05; Tied 6–6)

Second quarter

- (8:38) ASU – Jeff Sims 2-yard run, Ian Hershey kick (Drive: 13 plays, 72 yards, 7:27; Arizona State 13–6)
- (0:23) UTAH – Cole Becker 29-yard field goal (Drive: 11 plays, 60 yards, 1:25; Arizona State 13–9)

Third quarter

- (3:18) UTAH – Micah Bernard 6-yard run, Cole Becker kick (Drive: 12 plays, 79 yards, 7:05; Utah 16–13)
- (1:32) ASU – Cam Skattebo 50-yard run, Ian Hershey kick (Drive: 4 plays, 75 yards, 1:47; Arizona State 20–16)

Fourth quarter

- (5:42) UTAH – Cole Becker 46-yard field goal (Drive: 6 plays, 2 yards, 3:09; Arizona State 20–19)
- (2:41) ASU – Cam Skattebo 47-yard run, Ian Hershey kick (Drive: 5 plays, 75 yards, 3:01; Arizona State 27–19)

Statistics	UTAH	ASU
First downs	22	15
Total yards	349	343
Rushing yards	140	176
Passing yards	209	167
Passing: Comp–Att–Int	16–37–3	11–18–1
Time of possession	32:29	27:31

Team	Category	Player	Statistics
Utah	Passing	Cam Rising	16/37, 209 yards, 3 INT
Utah	Rushing	Micah Bernard	21 carries, 129 yards, TD
Utah	Receiving	Dorian Singer	4 receptions, 75 yards
Arizona State	Passing	Sam Leavitt	11/18, 154 yards, TD, INT
Arizona State	Rushing	Cam Skattebo	22 carries, 158 yards, 2 TD
Arizona State	Receiving	Jordyn Tyson	5 receptions, 84 yards, TD

=== at Cincinnati ===
Arizona State Sun Devils (5–1) at Cincinnati Bearcats (4–2) – Game summary

Quarter	1	2	3	4	Total
Sun Devils	7	0	7	0	14
Bearcats	10	14	0	0	24

at Nippert Stadium • Cincinnati, OH

- Date: October 19, 2024
- Game time: 9:00 a.m.
- Game weather: Sunny • Temperature: 63 °F (17 °C) • Wind: at 0 miles per hour (0 km/h)
- Game attendance: 38,007
- Referee: Kevin Mar
- TV announcers (ESPN+): Shawn Kenney (play-by-play), Max Starks (analyst), and Shane Sparks (sideline)

Game information

First quarter

- (10:35) ASU – Cameron Skattebo 2-yard run, Ian Hershey kick (Drive: 6 plays, 66 yards, 3:06; Arizona State 7–0)
- (7:26) CIN – Brendan Sorsby 14-yard run, Nathan Hawks kick (Drive: 2 plays, 22 yards, 0:46; Tied 7–7)
- (2:18) CIN – Nathan Hawks 46-yard field goal (Drive: 6 plays, 13 yards, 3:11; Cincinnati 10–7)

Second quarter

- (11:38) CIN – Evan Pryor 55-yard run, Nathan Hawks kick (Drive: 6 plays, 91 yards, 3:19; Cincinnati 17–7)
- (1:55) CIN – Brendan Sorsby 1-yard run, Nathan Hawks kick (Drive: 5 plays, 50 yards, 2:47; Cincinnati 24–7)

Third quarter

- (10:35) ASU – Cameron Skattebo 1-yard run, Ian Hershey kick (Drive: 8 plays, 74 yards, 4:23; Arizona State 24–14)

Fourth quarter

No scoring plays

Statistics	ASU	CIN
First downs	18	23
Total yards	346	397
Rushing yards	191	191
Passing yards	155	206
Passing: Comp–Att–Int	12–23–0	23–31–1
Time of possession	25:20	34:40

Team	Category	Player	Statistics
Arizona State	Passing	Jeff Sims	12/23, 155 yards
Arizona State	Rushing	Cameron Skattebo	17 carries, 76 yards, 2 TD
Arizona State	Receiving	Jordyn Tyson	8 receptions, 108 yards
Cincinnati	Passing	Brendan Sorsby	23/31, 206 yards, INT
Cincinnati	Rushing	Corey Kiner	22 carries, 108 yards
Cincinnati	Receiving	Xzavier Henderson	8 receptions, 67 yards

=== at Oklahoma State ===
Arizona State Sun Devils (5–2) at Oklahoma State Cowboys (3–5) – Game summary

Quarter	1	2	3	4	Total
Sun Devils	7	14	7	14	42
Cowboys	0	14	0	7	21

at Boone Pickens Stadium • Stillwater, OK

- Date: November 2, 2024
- Game time: 12:30 p.m.
- Game weather: 64 °F (18 °C)
- Game attendance: 52,202
- Referee: Cravonne Barrett
- TV announcers (FOX-local markets/FS2-non local markets): Connor Onion (play-by-play) and Mark Helfrich (analyst)

Game information

First quarter

- (11:21) ASU – Sam Leavitt 22-yard pass to Jordyn Tyson, Parker Lewis kick (Drive: 8 plays, 75 yards, 3:39; ASU 7–0)

Second quarter

- (12:48) OSU – Alan Bowman 1-yard pass to Brennan Presley, Logan Ward kick (Drive: 6 plays, 53 yards, 0:14; Tied 7–7)
- (9:18) ASU – Sam Leavitt 50-yard pass to Cam Skattebo, Parker Lewis kick (Drive: 7 plays, 75 yards, 3:30; ASU 14–7)
- (5:26) OSU – Ollie Gordon II 2-yard rush, Logan Ward kick (Drive: 10 plays, 75 yards, 3:52; Tied 14–14)
- (0:20) ASU – Cam Skattebo 1-yard rush, Parker Lewis kick (Drive: 13 plays, 75 yards, 5:06; ASU 21–14)

Third quarter

- (5:19) ASU – Keystone Brown 7-yard rush, Parker Lewis kick (Drive: 8 plays, 61 yards, 3:04; ASU 28–14)

Fourth quarter

- (14:12) ASU – Sam Leavitt 36-yard pass to Cam Skattebo, Parker Lewis kick (Drive: 9 plays, 88 yards, 4:16; ASU 35–14)
- (10:22) ASU – Kyson Brown 1-yard rush, Parker Lewis kick (Drive: 5 plays, 34 yards, 2:38; ASU 42–14)
- (4:11) OSU – Sesi Valiahi 11-yard rush, Logan Ward kick (Drive: 7 plays, 49 yards, 2:53: ASU 42–21)

Statistics	ASU	OKST
First downs	26	16
Total yards	529	270
Rushing yards	225	81
Passing yards	304	189
Passing: Comp–Att–Int	20–29–0	19–33–1
Time of possession	38:31	21:29

Team	Category	Player	Statistics
Arizona State	Passing	Sam Leavitt	20/29, 304 yards, 3 TD
Arizona State	Rushing	Cam Skattebo	23 carries, 153 yards, TD
Arizona State	Receiving	Cam Skattebo	4 receptions, 121 yards, 2 TD
Oklahoma State	Passing	Alan Bowman	13/31, 178 yards, TD, INT
Oklahoma State	Rushing	Ollie Gordon II	11 carries, 25 yards, TD
Oklahoma State	Receiving	De'Zhaun Stribling	5 receptions, 77 yards

=== vs UCF ===
UCF Knights (4–5) vs Arizona State Sun Devils (6–2) – Game summary

Quarter	1	2	3	4	Total
Knights	7	10	7	7	31
Sun Devils	7	14	7	7	35

at Mountain America Stadium • Tempe, AZ

- Date: November 9, 2024
- Game time: 5:00 p.m.
- Game weather: 74 °F (23 °C)
- Game attendance: 44,940
- Referee: Luke Richmond
- TV announcers (ESPN2): Brian Custer (play-by-play), Rod Gilmore (analyst) and Lauren Sisler (sideline)

Game information

First quarter

- (7:46) UCF – RJ Harvey 8-yard run, Grant Reddick kick (Drive: 13 plays, 75 yards, 7:14; UCF 7–0)
- (2:17) ASU – Montana Warren 46-yard return of blocked punt, Parker Lewis kick (Tied 7–7)

Second quarter

- (12:39) UCF – Grant Reddick 45-yard field goal (Drive: 11 plays, 47 yards, 4:38; UCF 10–7)
- (4:56) UCF – Jacurri Brown 6-yard run, Grant Reddick kick (Drive: 11 plays, 66 yards, 5:30; UCF 17–7)
- (0:56) ASU – Chamon Metayer 4-yard pass from Sam Leavitt, Parker Lewis kick (Drive: 9 plays, 75 yards, 4:00; UCF 17–14)
- (0:47) ASU – Laterrance Welch 9-yard interception return, Parker Lewis kick (ASU 21–17)

3rd Quarter

- (5:03) UCF – RJ Harvey 8-yard run, Grant Reddick kick (Drive: 5 plays, 54 yards, 2:15; UCF 24–21)
- (0:43) ASU – Jordyn Tyson 9-yard pass from Sam Leavitt, Parker Lewis kick (Drive: 8 plays, 75 yards, 4:20; ASU 28–24)

4th Quarter

- (13:04) UCF – RJ Harvey 13-yard run, Grant Reddick kick (Drive: 6 plays, 75 yards, 2:39; UCF 31–28)
- (4:55) ASU – Jordyn Tyson 13 Yd pass from Sam Leavitt, Parker Lewis kick (Drive: 9 plays, 71 yards, 4:38; ASU 35–31)

Statistics	UCF	ASU
First downs	26	18
Total yards	406	260
Rushing yards	177	99
Passing yards	229	161
Passing: Comp–Att–Int	24–34–1	16–25–0
Time of possession	31:20	28:40

Team	Category	Player	Statistics
UCF	Passing	Dylan Rizk	24/34, 229 yards, INT
UCF	Rushing	RJ Harvey	25 carries, 127 yards, 3 TD
UCF	Receiving	Randy Pittman Jr.	4 receptions, 62 yards
Arizona State	Passing	Sam Leavitt	16/33, 161 yards, 3 TD
Arizona State	Rushing	Kyson Brown	18 carries, 73 yards
Arizona State	Receiving	Jordyn Tyson	7 receptions, 99 yards, 2 TD

=== at No. 16 Kansas State ===
Arizona State Sun Devils (7–2) at No. 16 Kansas State Wildcats (7–2) – Game summary

Quarter	1	2	3	4	Total
Sun Devils	7	14	3	0	24
No. 16 Wildcats	0	0	6	8	14

at Bill Snyder Family Stadium • Manhattan, KS

- Date: November 16, 2024
- Game time: 5:00 p.m.
- Game weather: 66 °F (19 °C)
- Game attendance: 51,880
- TV announcers (ESPN): Dave Flemming (play-by-play), Brock Osweiler (analyst), and Stormy Buonantony (sideline)

Game information

First quarter

- (11:19) ASU – Jordyn Tyson 11-yard pass from Sam Leavitt, Parker Lewis kick (Drive: 6 plays, 49 yards, 2:58; Arizona State 7–0)

Second quarter

- (14:18) ASU – Jordyn Tyson 30-yard pass from Sam Leavitt, Parker Lewis kick (Drive: 11 plays, 67 yards, 6:31; Arizona State 14–0)
- (14:18) ASU – Chamon Metayer 16-yard pass from Sam Leavitt, Parker Lewis kick (Drive: 7 plays, 61 yards, 2:49; Arizona State 21–0)

Third quarter

- (11:00) ASU – Parker Lewis 47-yard field goal (Drive: 7 plays, 46 yards, 4:00; Arizona State 24–0)
- (2:51) KSU – Avery Johnson 10-yard run, (pass failed) (Drive: 6 plays, 78 yards, 2:24; Arizona State 24–6)

Fourth quarter

- (11:26) KSU – Joe Jackson 4-yard run, (pass converted) (Drive: 4 plays, 90 yards, 1:19; Arizona State 24–14)

Statistics	ASU	KSU
First downs	23	21
Total yards	398	412
Rushing yards	123	154
Passing yards	275	258
Passing: Comp–Att–Int	21–34–0	24–40–2
Time of possession	36:36	23:24

Team	Category	Player	Statistics
Arizona State	Passing	Sam Leavitt	21/34, 275 yards, 3 TD
Arizona State	Rushing	Cam Skattebo	25 carries, 73 yards
Arizona State	Receiving	Jordyn Tyson	12 receptions, 176 yards, 2 TD
Kansas State	Passing	Avery Johnson	24/40, 258 yards, 2 INT
Kansas State	Rushing	DJ Giddens	14 carries, 133 yards
Kansas State	Receiving	Dante Cephas	4 receptions, 65 yards

=== vs No. 14 BYU ===
No. 14 BYU Cougars (9–1) vs No. 21 Arizona State Sun Devils (8–2) – Game summary

Quarter	1	2	3	4	Total
No. 14 Cougars	0	3	14	6	23
No. 21 Sun Devils	7	14	7	0	28

at Mountain America Stadium • Tempe, AZ

- Date: November 23, 2024
- Game time: 1:30 p.m.
- Game weather: 0 °F (−18 °C)
- TV announcers (ESPN): Dave Pasch (play-by-play), Dusty Dvoracek (analyst), and Taylor McGregor (sideline reporter)

Game information

First quarter

- (6:41) ASU – Cam Skattebo 3-yard run, Parker Lewis kick (Drive: 10 plays, 54 yards, 4:48; Arizona State 7–0)

Second quarter

- (4:29) ASU – Cam Skattebo 4-yard run, Parker Lewis kick (Drive: 12 plays, 95 yards, 6:50; Arizona State 14–0)
- (1:53) ASU – Cam Skattebo 23-yard run, Parker Lewis kick (Drive: 6 plays, 50 yards, 2:36; Arizona State 21–0)
- (4:28) BYU – Will Ferrin 49-yard field goal (Drive: 8 plays, 34 yards, 1:11; Arizona State 21–3)

Third quarter

- (2:49) BYU – Keelan Marion 23-yard run, (run failed) (Drive: 12 plays, 96 yards, 5:29; Arizona State 21–9)
- (2:06) ASU – Xavier Guillory 61-yard pass from Sam Leavitt, Parker Lewis kick (Drive: 2 plays, 75 yards, 0:43; Arizona State 28–9)
- (2:06) BYU – Jojo Phillips 21-yard pass from Jake Retzlaff, (pass converted) (Drive: 4 plays, 73 yards, 1:17; Arizona State 28–17)

Fourth quarter

- (8:44) BYU – Keelan Marion 1-yard run, (pass failed) (Drive: 9 plays, 88 yards, 3:44; Arizona State 28–23)

Statistics	BYU	ASU
First downs	27	22
Total yards	440	401
Rushing yards	23–94	44–154
Passing yards	346	247
Passing: Comp–Att–Int	23–38–2	16–25–1
Time of possession	24:55	35:05

Team	Category	Player	Statistics
BYU	Passing	Jake Retzlaff	23/38, 346 yards, TD, 2 INT
BYU	Rushing	LJ Martin	9 carries, 42 yards
BYU	Receiving	Chase Roberts	6 receptions, 108 yards
Arizona State	Passing	Sam Leavitt	16/25, 247 yards, TD, INT
Arizona State	Rushing	Cam Skattebo	28 carries, 147 yards, 3 TD
Arizona State	Receiving	Jordyn Tyson	9 receptions, 125 yards

=== at Arizona (rivalry) ===
No. 16 Arizona State Sun Devils (9–2) at Arizona Wildcats (4–7) – Game summary

Quarter	1	2	3	4	Total
No. 16 Sun Devils	14	21	0	14	49
Wildcats	0	0	7	0	7

at Arizona Stadium • Tucson, AZ

- Date: November 30, 2024
- Game time: 1:30 p.m.
- Game weather: 76 °F (24 °C)
- Game attendance: 49,813
- Referee: Luke Richmond
- TV announcers (FOX): Jason Benetti (play-by-play), Brock Huard (analyst), and Allison Williams (sideline)

Game information

First quarter

- (9:32) ASU – Cam Skattebo 2-yard run, Parker Lewis kick (Drive: 9 plays, 75 yards, 5:28; ASU 7–0)
- (9:32) ASU – Cam Skattebo 2-yard run, Parker Lewis kick (Drive: 5 plays, 73 yards, 2:17; ASU 14–0)

Second quarter

- (13:29) ASU – Jordyn Tyson 13-yard pass from Sam Leavitt, Parker Lewis kick (Drive: 6 plays, 80 yards, 3:08; ASU 21–0)
- (6:28) ASU – Cam Skattebo 3-yard run, Parker Lewis kick (Drive: 11 plays, 63 yards, 6:00; ASU 28–0)
- (0:41) ASU – Chamon Metayer 22-yard pass from Sam Leavitt, Parker Lewis kick (Drive: 5 plays, 70 yards, 0:46; ASU 35–0)

Third quarter

- (10:53) ARI – Tetairoa McMillan 28-yard pass from Noah Fifita, Tyler Loop kick (Drive: 8 plays, 75 yards, 4:07; ASU 35–7)

Fourth quarter

- (14:55) ASU – Xavier Guillory 31-yard pass from Sam Leavitt, Parker Lewis kick (Drive: 9 plays, 81 yards, 4:33; ASU 42–7)
- (10:56) ASU – Derek Eusebio 64-yard pass from Trenton Bourguet, Parker Lewis kick (Drive: 3 plays, 75 yards, 1:33; ASU 49–7)

Statistics	ASU	ARIZ
First downs	24	15
Total yards	643	210
Rushing yards	281	84
Passing yards	362	126
Passing: Comp–Att–Int	19–25–0	14–31–1
Time of possession	33:57	26:03

Team	Category	Player	Statistics
Arizona State	Passing	Sam Leavitt	17/22, 291 yards, 3 TD
Arizona State	Rushing	Cam Skattebo	21 carries, 177 yards, 3 TD
Arizona State	Receiving	Jordyn Tyson	8 receptions, 143 yards, TD
Arizona	Passing	Noah Fifita	14/29, 126 yards, TD
Arizona	Rushing	Keedrick Reescano	11 carries, 55 yards
Arizona	Receiving	Tetairoa McMillan	6 receptions, 68 yards, TD

=== vs No. 16 Iowa State (Big 12 Championship Game) ===
2024 Big 12 Championship Game
No. 16 Iowa State Cyclones (10-2, 7-2) at No. 15 Arizona State Sun Devils (10-2, 7-2)

Quarter	1	2	3	4	Total
No. 16 Cyclones	7	3	0	9	19
No. 15 Sun Devils	10	14	21	0	45

at AT&T Stadium • Arlington, Texas

- Date: December 7, 2024
- Game time: 10:00 MST
- TV announcers (ABC/ESPN+/ESPN Radio): Joe Tessitore (play-by-play), Jesse Palmer (analyst), and Katie George (sideline reporter)/Mike Couzens (play-by-play), Max Starks (analyst), and Mike Peasley (sideline reporter)

Game information

First quarter

- (11:51) ASU – Carston Kieffer 49-yard field goal (Drive: 7 plays, 60 yards, 3:09; Arizona State 3–0)
- (6:30) ISU – Carson Hansen 3-yard pass from Rocco Becht, Kyle Konrardy kick (Drive: 11 plays, 75 yards, 5:21; Iowa State 7–3)
- (2:46) ASU – Sam Leavitt 3-yard run, Carston Kieffer kick (Drive: 7 plays, 75 yards, 3:44; Arizona State 10–7)

Second quarter

- (13:51) ISU – Kyle Konrardy 36-yard field goal (Drive: 10 plays, 57 yards, 3:55; Tied 10–10)
- (10:49) ASU – Cam Skattebo 3-yard run, Carston Kieffer kick (Drive: 5 plays, 72 yards, 3:02; Arizona State 17–10)
- (10:49) ASU – Cam Skattebo 2-yard run, Carston Kieffer kick (Drive: 4 plays, 72 yards, 1:13; Arizona State 24–10)

Third quarter

- (7:38) ASU – Xavier Guillory 8-yard pass from Sam Leavitt, Carston Kieffer kick (Drive: 11 plays, 43 yards, 5:28; Arizona State 31–10)
- (6:27) ASU – Xavier Guillory 21-yard pass from Sam Leavitt, Carston Kieffer kick (Drive: 3 plays, 26 yards, 0:51; Arizona State 38–10)
- (2:57) ASU – Cam Skattebo 21-yard pass from Sam Leavitt, Carston Kieffer kick (Drive: 3 plays, 38 yards, 1:25; Arizona State 45–10)

Fourth quarter

- (12:04) ISU – Kyle Konrardy 24-yard field goal (Drive: 13 plays, 70 yards, 5:53; Arizona State 45–13)
- (7:27) ISU – Jaylin Noel 25-yard pass from Rocco Becht, (pass failed) (Drive: 8 plays, 68 yards, 2:24; Arizona State 45–19)

Statistics	ISU	ASU
First downs	23	17
Total yards	341	464
Rushing yards	127	245
Passing yards	214	219
Turnovers	3	0
Time of possession	29:33	30:27

Team	Category	Player	Statistics
Iowa State	Passing	Rocco Becht	21/35, 214 yards, 2 TD, INT
Iowa State	Rushing	Carson Hansen	10 carries, 52 yards
Iowa State	Receiving	Jayden Higgins	7 receptions, 115 yards
Arizona State	Passing	Sam Leavitt	12/17, 219 yards, 3 TD
Arizona State	Rushing	Cam Skattebo	16 carries, 170 yards, 2 TD
Arizona State	Receiving	Melquan Stovall	4 receptions, 91 yards

=== vs No.3 Texas (Peach Bowl / CFP Quarterfinal) ===
College Football Playoff Quarterfinal at the 2025 Chick-fil-A Peach Bowl
No. 3 Texas Longhorns (12–2) vs No. 12 Arizona State Sun Devils (11–2)

Quarter	1	2	3	4	OT	2OT	Total
No. 3 Longhorns	14	3	0	7	7	8	39
No. 12 Sun Devils	3	0	5	16	7	0	31

at Mercedes-Benz Stadium • Atlanta, Georgia

- Date: Wednesday, January 1, 2025
- Game time: 11:00 a.m. MST
- Game weather: Partly cloudy (roof closed) • Temperature: 49 °F (9 °C) • Wind: NW at 12 miles per hour (19 km/h)
- Game attendance: 71,105
- TV announcers (ESPN/ESPN Radio): Joe Tessitore (play-by-play), Jesse Palmer (analyst), Katie George, and Taylor McGregor (sideline)/Anish Shroff (play-by-play), Andre Ware (analyst), and Paul Carcaterra (sideline)

Game information

First quarter

- (11:51) ASU – Carston Kieffer 39-yard field goal (Drive: 12 plays, 63 yards, 6:01; Arizona State 3–0)
- (8:14) TEX – DeAndre Moore Jr. 23-yard pass from Quinn Ewers, Bert Auburn kick (Drive: 2 plays, 77 yards, 0:45; Texas 7–3)
- (7:08) TEX – Silas Bolden 75-punt return, Bert Auburn kick (Drive: 3 plays, 2 yards, 1:06; Texas 14–3)

Second quarter

- (8:54) TEX – Bert Auburn 22-yard field goal (Drive: 13 plays, 72 yards, 6:02; Texas 17–3)

Third quarter

- (7:38) ASU – Shamari Simmons safety (Drive: 1 play, -2 yards, 0:05; Texas 17–5)
- (0:41) ASU – Carston Kieffer 36-yard field goal (Drive: 11 plays, 50 yards, 6:57; Texas 17–8)

Fourth quarter

- (10:17) TEX – Quinn Ewers 5-yard run, Bert Auburn kick (Drive: 13 plays, 76 yards, 5:24; Texas 24–8)
- (6:31) ASU – Malik McClain 42-yard pass from Cam Skattebo, (pass converted) (Drive: 10 plays, 75 yards, 3:46; Texas 24–16)
- (5:00) ASU – Cam Skattebo 2-yard run, (run converted) (Drive: 3 plays, 79 yards, 0:37; Tied 24–24)

Overtime

- (OT) ASU – Cam Skattebo 3-yard run, Carston Kieffer kick (Drive: 8 plays, 25 yards; Arizona State 31–24)
- (OT) TEX – Matthew Golden 28-yard pass from Quinn Ewers, Bert Auburn kick (Drive: 4 plays, 25 yards; Tied 31–31)

Second Overtime

- (OT) TEX – Gunnar Helm 25-yard pass from Quinn Ewers, (pass converted) (Drive: 1 plays, 25 yards; Texas 39–31)

Statistics	TEX	ASU
First downs	17	28
Total yards	375	510
Rushing yards	53	214
Passing yards	322	296
Turnovers	1	1
Time of possession	22:06	37:54

Team	Category	Player	Statistics
Texas	Passing	Quinn Ewers	20/30, 322 yards, 3 TD, INT
Texas	Rushing	Quintrevion Wisner	18 carries, 45 yards
Texas	Receiving	Matthew Golden	7 receptions, 149 yards, TD
Arizona State	Passing	Sam Leavitt	24/46, 222 yards, INT
Arizona State	Rushing	Cam Skattebo	30 carries, 143 yards, 2 TD
Arizona State	Receiving	Cam Skattebo	8 receptions, 99 yards

== Rankings ==
Ranking movements Legend: ██ Increase in ranking ██ Decrease in ranking — = Not ranked RV = Received votes
	Week																
Poll	Pre	1	2	3	4	5	6	7	8	9	10	11	12	13	14	15	Final
AP	—	—	—	RV	—	—	—	RV	—	—	RV	RV	21	14	12	10	7
Coaches	—	—	RV	RV	—	—	RV	RV	RV	RV	RV	RV	22	15	13	10	7
CFP	Not released										—	—	21	16	15	12	Not released
