= 2025 Arizona State Sun Devils football team =

American college football season

2025 Arizona State Sun Devils football

Sun Bowl, L 39–42 vs. Duke
- Conference: Big 12 Conference
- Record: 8–5 (6–3 Big 12)
- Head coach: Kenny Dillingham (3rd season)
- Offensive coordinator: Marcus Arroyo (2nd season)
- Offensive scheme: Pistol
- Defensive coordinator: Brian Ward (3rd season)
- Base defense: 4–3 or 4–2–5
- Home stadium: Mountain America Stadium

Uniform
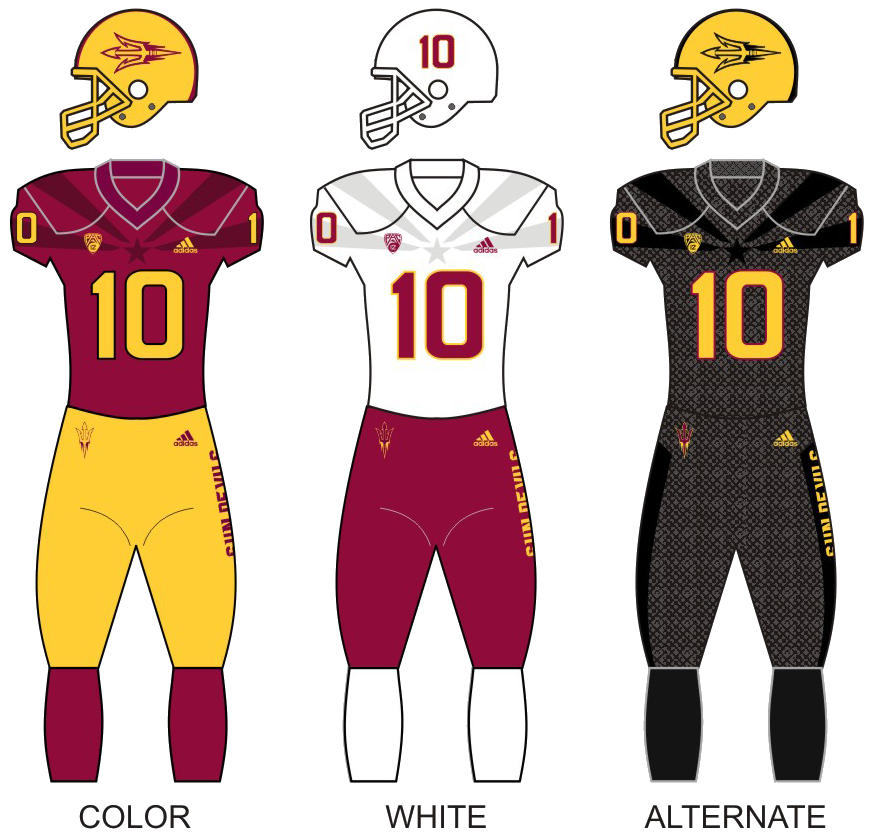

2025 Big 12 Conference football standings
	Conf.			Overall
Team	W		L	W		L
No. 7 Texas Tech y$^	8	–	1	12	–	2
No. 11 BYU y	8	–	1	12	–	2
No. 14 Utah	7	–	2	11	–	2
No. 22 Houston	6	–	3	10	–	3
Arizona	6	–	3	9	–	4
Arizona State	6	–	3	8	–	5
No. 25 TCU	5	–	4	9	–	4
Iowa State	5	–	4	8	–	4
Cincinnati	5	–	4	7	–	6
Kansas State	5	–	4	6	–	6
Baylor	3	–	6	5	–	7
Kansas	3	–	6	5	–	7
UCF	2	–	7	5	–	7
West Virginia	2	–	7	4	–	8
Colorado	1	–	8	3	–	9
Oklahoma State	0	–	9	1	–	11
Championship: Texas Tech 34, BYU 7
^ – College Football Playoff participant; $ – Conference champion; y – Championship game participant; Rankings from AP Poll

The 2025 Arizona State Sun Devils football team represented Arizona State University as a member of the Big 12 Conference during the 2025 NCAA Division I FBS football season. They were led by Kenny Dillingham in his third year as their head coach. The Sun Devils played their home games at Mountain America Stadium located in Tempe, Arizona. The season was the Sun Devils' second year in the Big 12.

The Arizona State Sun Devils drew an average home attendance of 54,444.

== Schedule ==
Date	Time	Opponent	Rank	Site	TV	Result	Attendance
August 30	7:00 p.m.	No. 19 (FCS) Northern Arizona*	No. 11	Mountain America Stadium; Tempe, AZ	ESPN+	W 38–19	56,759
September 6	4:30 p.m.	at Mississippi State*	No. 12	Davis Wade Stadium; Starkville, MS	ESPN2	L 20–24	50,808
September 13	7:30 p.m.	Texas State*		Mountain America Stadium; Tempe, AZ	TNT/TruTV	W 34–15	54,005
September 20	4:30 p.m.	at Baylor		McLane Stadium; Waco, TX	FOX	W 27–24	40,964
September 26	6:00 p.m.	No. 24 TCU		Mountain America Stadium; Tempe, AZ	FOX	W 27–24	53,774
October 11	7:15 p.m.	at Utah	No. 21	Rice–Eccles Stadium; Salt Lake City, UT	ESPN	L 10–42	51,444
October 18	1:00 p.m.	No. 7 Texas Tech		Mountain America Stadium; Tempe, AZ	FOX	W 26–22	54,177
October 25	5:00 p.m.	Houston	No. 24	Mountain America Stadium; Tempe, AZ	ESPN2	L 16–24	54,256
November 1	10:00 a.m.	at Iowa State		Jack Trice Stadium; Ames, IA	TNT/TruTV	W 24–19	60,889
November 15	11:00 a.m.	West Virginia^{†}		Mountain America Stadium; Tempe, AZ	TNT/TruTV	W 25–23	54,101
November 22	6:00 p.m.	at Colorado	No. 25	Folsom Field; Boulder, CO	ESPN2	W 42–17	43,348
November 28	7:00 p.m.	No. 25 Arizona	No. 20	Mountain America Stadium; Tempe, AZ (rivalry)	FOX	L 7–23	54,037
December 31	2:00 p.m.	vs. Duke*		Sun Bowl; El Paso, TX (Sun Bowl)	CBS	L 39–42	44,975
*Non-conference game; ^{†}Homecoming; Rankings from AP Poll (and CFP Rankings, after November 4) - Released prior to game; All times are in Mountain time

== Rankings ==
Ranking movements Legend: ██ Increase in ranking ██ Decrease in ranking — = Not ranked RV = Received votes
	Week																
Poll	Pre	1	2	3	4	5	6	7	8	9	10	11	12	13	14	15	Final
AP	11	12	RV	RV	RV	25	21	—	24	—	RV	RV	RV	RV	RV	RV	—
Coaches	11	10	24	RV	RV	24	23	RV	25	RV	RV	RV	RV	RV	RV	RV	—
CFP	Not released										—	—	25	20	—	—	Not released

== Offseason ==
Positions key
Offense	Defense	Special teams
QB — Quarterback; RB — Running back; FB — Fullback; WR — Wide receiver; TE — Tight end; OL — Offensive lineman; T — Tackle; G — Guard; C — Center	DL — Defensive lineman; DT — Defensive tackle (Note: Includes nose tackle (NT)); DE — Defensive end; EDGE — Edge rusher; LB — Linebacker (Note: Includes middle linebacker (MLB/MIKE), weakside linebacker (WILL), strongside linebacker (SAM), off-ball linebacker, and outside linebacker (OLB)); DB — Defensive back; CB — Cornerback; S — Safety (Note: Includes free safety (FS) and strong safety (SS))	K — Kicker (Note: Also known as a placekicker (PK)); P — Punter; LS — Long snapper; RS — Return specialist (Note: Includes kickoff and punt returners)

=== Players drafted into the NFL ===
Round	Pick	NFL team	Player	Position
4	105	New York Giants	Cam Skattebo	RB

=== Undrafted free agents ===
NFL team	Player	Position
Baltimore Ravens	Xavier Guillory	WR
Detroit Lions	Leif Fautanu	C

=== Transfers ===
==== Outgoing transfers ====
Arizona State Outgoing transfers
Name	Pos.	College transferred to
Tyler Laskaris	QB	TBD
Navi Bruzon	QB	Highland CC
Alton McCaskill	RB	Sam Houston
Max Ware	WR	Hawaii
Justice Spann	WR	Memphis
Korbin Hendrix	WR	Montana
Jamaal Young	WR	North Dakota
Kaleb Black	WR	Sam Houston
Troy Omeire	WR	UNLV
Armon Collins	WR	Community Christian
Markeston Douglas	TE	Florida State
Keona Peat	OL	Arizona
Connor Cameron	OL	Baylor
Kaden Haeckel	OL	Idaho
Sirri Kandiyeli	OL	Southern Utah
Luis Cordova	OL	Utah Tech
Tristan Monday	DL	TBD
Harold Brooks	DL	TBD
Chance Symons	DL	North Dakota State
J'Mond Tapp	DL	Southern Miss
Kyran Bourda	DL	Texas State
J.P. Deeter	DL	Texas State
Landen Thomas	DL	UNLV
Myles Amey	LB	Southern Utah
K'Vion Thunderbird	LB	Fresno State
Keontez Bradley	CB	Buffalo
Cole Martin	CB	UCLA
Laterrance Welch	CB	UNLV
Kamari Wilson	S	Memphis
Ian Hershey	K/P	Texas Tech
Cole Marszalek	LS	Jacksonville State

† Note: Players with a dash in the new school column didn't land on a new team for the 2025 season.

==== Incoming transfers ====
Arizona State Incoming transfers
Name	Pos.	Previous school
Kanye Udoh	RB	Army
Jaren Hamilton	WR	Alabama
Noble Johnson	WR	Clemson
Jalen Moss	WR	Fresno State
Akim Lanieux	WR	Northern Illinois
Khamari Anderson	TE	Kentucky
Brent Helton	OL	Iowa State
Wade Helton	OL	Iowa State
Xander Ruggeroli	OL	Nebraska
Jimeto Obigbo	OL	Texas State
My'Keil Gardner	DL	Oregon
Rashad McKenzie	DL	Washington State
Kyndrich Breedlove	CB	Purdue
Nyland Green	CB	Purdue
Adrian Wilson	CB	Washington State
Maurice Williams	S	Houston
Tommy Christakos	PK	California
Jesús Gómez	PK	Eastern Michigan
Cade Davis	LS	Marshall

=== Recruiting class ===
Arizona State signed 23 players in the class of 2025. The Sun Devils' recruiting class was ranked forty-eighth by On3.com, fortieth by Rivals.com, and fifty-fourth by 247Sports.com. One signee was ranked in the ESPN 300 top prospect list.

College recruiting
Name	Hometown	School	Height	Weight	Commit date
Cameron Dyer; QB	Albuquerque, NM	La Cueva High School	6 ft 3 in (1.91 m)	205 lb (93 kg)	Jun 4, 2024
Cameron Dyer; QB	Recruit ratings: Rivals: 247Sports: On3: ESPN: (81)				
Isaiah Iosefa; LB	Mililani, HI	Mililani High School	6 ft 0 in (1.83 m)	215 lb (98 kg)	Apr 21, 2024
Isaiah Iosefa; LB	Recruit ratings: Rivals: 247Sports: On3: ESPN: (80)				
Joseph Smith; CB	Spring, TX	Legacy the School of Sport Sciences	6 ft 0 in (1.83 m)	180 lb (82 kg)	Aug 5, 2023
Joseph Smith; CB	Recruit ratings: Rivals: 247Sports: On3: ESPN: (79)				
AJ Ia; TE	Orange, CA	Lutheran High School of Orange County	6 ft 6 in (1.98 m)	215 lb (98 kg)	Apr 30, 2024
AJ Ia; TE	Recruit ratings: Rivals: 247Sports: On3: ESPN: (79)				
Manamo'ui Muti; OT	Wahiawa, HI	Leilehua High School	6 ft 6 in (1.98 m)	255 lb (116 kg)	Sep 13, 2024
Manamo'ui Muti; OT	Recruit ratings: Rivals: 247Sports: On3: ESPN: (78)				
Chance Ables; WR	Plano, TX	Plano East Senior High School	6 ft 3 in (1.91 m)	180 lb (82 kg)	Nov 10, 2024
Chance Ables; WR	Recruit ratings: Rivals: 247Sports: On3: ESPN: (78)				
Maki Stewart; IOL	Long Beach, CA	Millikan High School	6 ft 6 in (1.98 m)	325 lb (147 kg)	May 2, 2024
Maki Stewart; IOL	Recruit ratings: Rivals: 247Sports: On3: ESPN: (78)				
Xavier Skowron; S	Texas City, TX	Texas City High School	6 ft 0 in (1.83 m)	185 lb (84 kg)	Apr 11, 2024
Xavier Skowron; S	Recruit ratings: Rivals: 247Sports: On3: ESPN: (77)				
Cory Butler Jr. WR	Corona, CA	Centennial High School	5 ft 9 in (1.75 m)	170 lb (77 kg)	Jun 2, 2024
Cory Butler Jr. WR	Recruit ratings: Rivals: 247Sports: On3: ESPN: (77)				
Michael Tollefson; QB	Tustin, CA	Tustin High School	6 ft 1 in (1.85 m)	200 lb (91 kg)	Jun 20, 2023
Michael Tollefson; QB	Recruit ratings: Rivals: 247Sports: On3: ESPN: (77)				
Benjamin Alefaio; S	Orange, CA	Lutheran High School of Orange County	6 ft 0 in (1.83 m)	195 lb (88 kg)	Apr 22, 2024
Benjamin Alefaio; S	Recruit ratings: Rivals: 247Sports: On3: ESPN: (76)				
Grayson Rigdon; RB	Columbus, TX	Columbus High School	5 ft 11 in (1.80 m)	190 lb (86 kg)	Feb 5, 2025
Grayson Rigdon; RB	Recruit ratings: Rivals: 247Sports: On3: ESPN: (76)				
Harry Hassmann; WR	Coppell, TX	Coppell High School	6 ft 0 in (1.83 m)	180 lb (82 kg)	Nov 17, 2024
Harry Hassmann; WR	Recruit ratings: Rivals: 247Sports: On3: ESPN: (76)				
Lee Fuimaono; LB	San Clemente, CA	San Clemente High School	6 ft 2 in (1.88 m)	215 lb (98 kg)	Jun 1, 2024
Lee Fuimaono; LB	Recruit ratings: Rivals: 247Sports: On3: ESPN: (76)				
Demarius Robinson; RB	Edmond, OK	Edmond Santa Fe High School	5 ft 10 in (1.78 m)	180 lb (82 kg)	Jun 19, 2024
Demarius Robinson; RB	Recruit ratings: Rivals: 247Sports: On3: ESPN: (75)				
Uriah Neloms; WR	Gilbert, AZ	San Tan Charter High School	6 ft 3 in (1.91 m)	195 lb (88 kg)	Jun 16, 2024
Uriah Neloms; WR	Recruit ratings: Rivals: 247Sports: On3: ESPN: (74)				
Rob Lapuaho; OT	Salt Lake City, UT	West High School	6 ft 6 in (1.98 m)	325 lb (147 kg)	May 2, 2024
Rob Lapuaho; OT	Recruit ratings: Rivals: 247Sports: On3: ESPN: (74)				
Daeshon Morgan; DL	Austin, TX	Vandegrift High School	6 ft 2 in (1.88 m)	265 lb (120 kg)	Jul 8, 2024
Daeshon Morgan; DL	Recruit ratings: Rivals: 247Sports: On3: ESPN: (74)				
Tristan Bacon; LB	Glendale, AZ	Raymond S. Kellis High School	6 ft 2 in (1.88 m)	225 lb (102 kg)	Oct 28, 2024
Tristan Bacon; LB	Recruit ratings: Rivals: 247Sports: On3: ESPN: (74)				
Alema Iosua; OT	Las Vegas, NV	Bishop Gorman High School	6 ft 6 in (1.98 m)	290 lb (130 kg)	Mar 30, 2024
Alema Iosua; OT	Recruit ratings: Rivals: 247Sports: On3: ESPN: (74)				
Desean Bryant Jr. OT	Duncanville, TX	Duncanville High School	6 ft 4 in (1.93 m)	250 lb (110 kg)	May 31, 2024
Desean Bryant Jr. OT	Recruit ratings: Rivals: 247Sports: On3: ESPN: (73)				
Matai Jefferson; IOL	Downey, CA	Warren High School	6 ft 4 in (1.93 m)	330 lb (150 kg)	Dec 25, 2023
Matai Jefferson; IOL	Recruit ratings: Rivals: 247Sports: On3: ESPN: (73)				
Doughless Teloma; IOL	Riverside, CA	Riverside Community College	6 ft 4 in (1.93 m)	350 lb (160 kg)	Feb 3, 2025
Doughless Teloma; IOL	Recruit ratings: Rivals: 247Sports: On3: ESPN: (72)				
Overall recruit ranking: Rivals: 40 247Sports: 54 On3: 48
‡ Refers to 40-yard dash; Note: In many cases, Scout, Rivals, 247Sports, On3, and ESPN may conflict in their listings of height, weight and 40 time.; In these cases, the average was taken. ESPN grades are on a 100-point scale.; Sources: "Arizona State Football Commitment List". Rivals.; "2025 Player Commitments – Arizona State". ESPN.; "2025 Team Ranking". Rivals.com.; "2025 Arizona State Sun Devils football team". 247Sports.

2025 overall class rankings

Website	National rank	Conference rank	5 star recruits	4 star recruits	3 star recruits	2 star recruits	1 star recruits	No star ranking
ESPN	–	–	—	2	21	0	0	0
On3 Recruits	#48	#10	—	2	21	0	0	0
Rivals	#40	#3	–	2	20	1	0	0
247 Sports	#54	#10	—	2	21	0	0	0

== Personnel ==
=== Roster ===
2025 Arizona State Sun Devils football team roster
Players
Coaches
Offense

Pos.	#	Name	Class
WR	0	Jordyn Tyson	RJr
RB	1	Kyson Brown	Jr
QB	2	Jeff Sims	RSr
RB	3	Raleek Brown	RJr
WR	5	Noble Johnson	RSo
RB	6	Kanye Udoh	Jr
TE	7	Chamon Metayer	RSr
TE	9	Cameron Harpole	RSr
QB	10	Sam Leavitt	RSo
WR	12	Malik McClain	RSr
QB	13	Cameron Dyer	Fr
TE	14	AJ Ia	Fr
TE	15	Khamari Anderson	Jr
WR	16	Jaren Hamilton	RFr
QB	17	Michael "Butter" Tollefson	Fr
WR	18	Jalen Moss	RJr
QB	19	Christian Hunt	RSo
RB	21	Grayson Rigdon	Fr
RB	22	Jason Brown Jr.	RFr
RB	23	Demarius "Man Man" Robinson	Fr
TE	24	Coleson Arends	RSo
TE	45	James Giggey	RFr
OL	51	Desean Bryant Jr.	Fr
OL	52	Manamo'ui Muti	Fr
OL	53	Josh Atkins	RSr
OL	54	Joey Su'a	RSo
OL	55	Jimeto Obigbo	RSr
OL	56	Rob Lapuaho	Fr
OL	58	Max Iheanachor	RSr
OL	59	Maki Stewart	Fr
OL	60	Xavier Ruggeroli	RFr
OL	62	Ben Coleman	GS
OL	64	Wade Helton	RFr
OL	70	Jalen Klemm	RJr
OL	71	Makua Pule	RSo
OL	72	Doughless Teloma	RJr
OL	73	Terrell Kim	RFr
OL	74	Sean Na'a	RSo
OL	76	Champ Westbrooks	RFr
OL	77	Kyle Scott	RSr
OL	78	Matai Jefferson	Fr
OL	79	Brent Helton	RFr
TE	80	Jayden Fortier	RFr
WR	81	Uriah Neloms	Fr
WR	82	Chance Ables	Fr
WR	83	Derek Eusebio	RSo
WR	84	Cory Butler Jr.	Fr
WR	85	Akim Lanieux	RJr
WR	87	Zechariah Sample	RFr
WR	88	Coben Bourguet	RSr
WR	89	Harry Hassmann	Fr

Defense

Pos.	#	Name	Class
DB	0	Rodney Bimage Jr.	RFr
DB	1	Keith Abney II	Jr
DB	2	Xavion Alford	RSr
DE	3	Albert Smith III	RFr
DB	4	Myles "Ghost" Rowser	Sr
S	5	Kyndrich Breedlove	RSr
S	6	Adrian "Boggie" Wilson	RSo
DB	7	Montana Warren	RSo
LB	8	Jordan Crook	Sr
DL	9	Elijah O'Neal	RSr
DL	10	Clayton Smith	RSr
DB	12	Javan Robinson	RJr
DL	13	Roman Pitre	RJr
S	14	Xavier Skowron	Fr
CB	15	Nyland Green	RSr
DB	16	Chris Johnson II	RFr
DL	17	Joshua Shanklin	So
LB	18	Martell Hughes	So
DB	19	Adama Fall	RSr
S	20	Maurice Williams	RFr
DB	21	Tony-Louis Nkuba	RFr
CB	22	Joseph Smith	Fr
S	23	Ben Alefaio-Lilii	Fr
LB	24	Tate Romney	RJr
DB	25	Jack Bal	RSo
LB	26	Isaiah Iosefa	Fr
DB	28	Joseph McGinnis II	RJr
DB	29	Plas Johnson	RFr
LB	30	Zyrus Fiaseu	RSr
DB	31	Nikko Klemm	RFr
DL	32	Prince Dorbah	RSr
DL	36	Salesi Manu	RFr
DB	38	Kyan McDonald	So
LB	43	Krew Jackson	RSr
LB	44	Keyshaun Elliott	Sr
LB	45	Tristan Bacon	Fr
DB	46	Tommy Romano	RSo
LB	48	Lee "Puka" Fuimaono	Fr
LB	49	Prayer Young-Blackgoat	RFr
DL	52	Ian Shewell	RSr
DL	55	Ramar Williams	RFr
DL	88	Daeshon Morgan	Fr
DL	91	Rashad McKenzie	RSo
DL	92	Zac Swanson	RJr
DL	93	MyKeil Gardner	RSo
DL	95	Justin Wodtly	RSr
DL	96	Anthonie Cooper	GS
DL	97	Blazen Lono-Wong	RJr
DL	98	Jacob Rich Kongaika	Sr
DL	99	C. J. Fite	Jr

Special teams

Pos.	#	Name	Class
K	26	Carston Kieffer	RSo
P	31	Kanyon Floyd	So
P	34	Matt McKenzie	RJr
K	35	Jesús Gómez	RSr
K	37	Tommy Christakos	RSr
LS	39	Tyler Wigglesworth	RSr
LS	90	Cade Davis	RSr

Head coach

- Kenny Dillingham

Coordinators/assistant coaches

- Charlie Ragle – Assistant head coach, special teams coordinator
- Hines Ward – Assistant coach, wide receivers
- Brian Ward – Defensive coordinator
- Marcus Arroyo – Offensive coordinator
- Shaun Aguano – Assistant coach, running backs
- Saga Tuitele – Assistant coach, offensive line
- A. J. Cooper – Assistant coach, linebackers, run game coordinator
- Bryan Carrington – Assistant coach, cornerbacks
- Jason Mohns – Assistant coach, tight ends
- Diron Reynolds – Assistant coach, defensive line
- Trenton Bourguet – Assistant, running backs

Legend

- (C) Team captain
- (S) Suspended
- (I) Ineligible
- Injured
- Redshirt

Roster
Last update: 2025-08-06

=== Support staff ===
- Jason Cvercko – Assistant Athletic Director, Chief of Staff
- Bryan McGinnis – Assistant Athletic Director for Football Operations

== Game summaries ==
=== vs No. 19 (FCS) Northern Arizona ===
No. 19 (FCS) Northern Arizona Lumberjacks (0–0) at No. 11 Arizona State Sun Devils (0–0) – Game summary

Quarter	1	2	3	4	Total
No. 19 (FCS) Lumberjacks	0	6	7	6	19
No. 11 Sun Devils	14	3	14	7	38

at Mountain America Stadium • Tempe, Arizona

- Date: August 30
- Game time: 7:00 p.m.
- Game weather: Sunny • Temperature: 100 °F (38 °C) • Wind: W 10 mph
- Game attendance: 56,759
- Referee: Cravonne Barrett
- TV announcers (ESPN+): Roxy Bernstein (play-by-play), Michael Bumpus (analyst), and Tori Petry (sideline)

Game information

First quarter

- ASU – Raleek Brown 6-yard run (Jesús Gómez kick), 10:42. Sun Devils 7–0. Drive: 5 plays, 49 yards, 2:44.
- ASU – Jordyn Tyson 19-yard pass from Sam Leavitt (Jesus Gomez kick), 5:08. Sun Devils 14–0. Drive: 7 plays, 89 yards, 3:24.

Second quarter

- NAU – Samuel Hunsaker 31-yard field goal, 14:14. Sun Devils 14–3. Drive: 5 plays, 14 yards, 2:06.
- ASU – Jesús Gómez 36-yard field goal, 1:55. Sun Devils 17–3. Drive: 9 plays, 47 yards, 5:25.
- NAU – Samuel Hunsaker 46-yard field goal, 0:15. Sun Devils 17–6. Drive: 10 plays, 53 yards, 1:33.

Third quarter

- ASU – Sam Leavitt 52-yard run (Jesús Gómez kick), 12:24. Sun Devils 24–6. Drive: 5 plays, 76 yards, 2:30.
- NAU – Nason Coleman 3-yard pass from Ty Pennington (Samuel Hunsaker kick), 8:14. Sun Devils 24–13. Drive: 9 plays, 75 yards, 4:10.
- ASU – Sam Leavitt 18-yard run (Jesús Gómez kick), 0:11. Sun Devils 31–13. Drive: 9 plays, 70 yards, 3:04.

Fourth quarter

- ASU – Jordyn Tyson 16-yard pass from Sam Leavitt (Jesús Gómez kick), 2:42. Sun Devils 38–13. Drive: 3 plays, 35 yards, 0:56.
- NAU – Kenveon Stone 1-yard run (run failed), 0:20. Sun Devils 38–19. Drive: 8 plays, 80 yards, 2:18.

Statistics	NAU	ASU
First downs	20	21
Plays–yards	55–331	60–460
Rushes–yards	29–89	21–203
Passing yards	242	257
Passing: comp–att–int	26–42–1	25–39–1
Turnovers	1	1
Time of possession	31:34	28:26

Team	Category	Player	Statistics
Northern Arizona	Passing	Ty Pennington	22/35, 204 yards, TD
Northern Arizona	Rushing	Kenveon Stone	3 carries, 35 yards, TD
Northern Arizona	Receiving	Kolbe Katsis	6 receptions, 76 yards
Arizona State	Passing	Sam Leavitt	25/39, 257 yards, 2 TD, INT
Arizona State	Rushing	Sam Leavitt	7 carries, 73 yards, 2 TD
Arizona State	Receiving	Jordyn Tyson	12 receptions, 141 yards, 2 TD

=== at Mississippi State ===
No. 12 Arizona State Sun Devils (1–0) at Mississippi State Bulldogs (1–0) – Game summary

Quarter	1	2	3	4	Total
No. 12 Sun Devils	0	3	7	10	20
Bulldogs	10	7	0	7	24

at Davis Wade Stadium • Starkville, Mississippi

- Date: September 6
- Game time: 4:30 p.m.
- Game weather: Clear • Temperature: 74 °F (23 °C) • Wind: N 3 mph
- Game attendance: 50,808
- Referee: Henry Johns
- TV announcers (ESPN2): Dave Flemming (play-by-play), Brock Osweiler (analyst), and Stormy Buonantony (sideline)

Game information

First quarter

- MSST – Anthony Evans III 48-yard pass from Blake Shapen (Kyle Ferrie kick), 13:51. Bulldogs 7–0. Drive: 4 plays, 75 yards, 1:09.
- MSST – Kyle Ferrie 37-yard field goal, 1:18. Bulldogs 10–0. Drive: 13 plays, 45 yards, 4:51.

Second quarter

- MSST – Brenen Thompson 47-yard pass from Blake Shapen (Kyle Ferrie kick), 12:51. Bulldogs 17–0. Drive: 2 plays, 47 yards, 0:12.
- ASU – Jesús Gómez 51-yard field goal, 0:00. Bulldogs 17–3. Drive: 5 plays, 33 yards, 0:32.

Third quarter

- ASU – Kanye Udoh 6-yard run (Jesús Gómez kick), 10:34. Bulldogs 17–10. Drive: 8 plays, 75 yards, 4:26.

Fourth quarter

- ASU – Jordyn Tyson 2-yard pass from Sam Leavitt (Jesús Gómez kick), 13:07. Tied 17–17. Drive: 9 plays, 49 yards, 5:19.
- ASU – Jesús Gómez 18-yard field goal, 1:38. Sun Devils 20–17. Drive: 17 plays, 95 yards, 8:54.
- MSST – Brenen Thompson 58-yard pass from Blake Shapen (Kyle Ferrie kick), 0:30. Bulldogs 24–20. Drive: 5 plays, 77 yards, 1:08.

Statistics	ASU	MSST
First downs	23	17
Plays–yards	74–333	63–345
Rushes–yards	51–251	30–66
Passing yards	82	279
Passing: comp–att–int	10–23–2	19–33–0
Turnovers	2	0
Time of possession	37:57	22:03

Team	Category	Player	Statistics
Arizona State	Passing	Sam Leavitt	10/22, 82 yards, TD, 2 INT
Arizona State	Rushing	Raleek Brown	18 carries, 110 yards
Arizona State	Receiving	Jordyn Tyson	6 receptions, 68 yards, TD
Mississippi State	Passing	Blake Shapen	19/33, 279 yards, 3 TD
Mississippi State	Rushing	Fluff Bothwell	8 carries, 34 yards
Mississippi State	Receiving	Brenen Thompson	6 receptions, 133 yards, 2 TD

=== vs Texas State ===
Texas State Bobcats (2–0) at Arizona State Sun Devils (1–1) – Game summary

Quarter	1	2	3	4	Total
Bobcats	3	0	6	6	15
Sun Devils	3	17	14	0	34

at Mountain America Stadium • Tempe, Arizona

- Date: September 13
- Game time: 7:30 p.m.
- Game weather: Sunny • Temperature: 94 °F (34 °C) • Wind: SW 5 mph
- Game attendance: 54,005
- Referee: Scott Broadway
- TV announcers (TNT): J. B. Long (play-by-play), Mike Golic Jr. (analyst), and Coy Wire (sideline)

Game information

First quarter

- ASU – Jesus Gomez 47-yard field goal, 6:40. Sun Devils 3–0. Drive: 5 plays, 39 yards, 2:19.
- TXST – Tyler Robles 39-yard field goal, 2:16. Tied 3–3. Drive: 13 plays, 54 yards, 4:24.

Second quarter

- ASU – Jordyn Tyson 30-yard pass from Sam Leavitt (Jesus Gomez kick), 12:47. Sun Devils 10–3. Drive: 10 plays, 75 yards, 4:29.
- ASU – Sam Leavitt 1-yard run (Jesus Gomez kick), 10:22. Sun Devils 17–3. Drive: 4 plays, 25 yards, 1:44.
- ASU – Jesus Gomez 26-yard field goal, 2:44. Sun Devils 20–3. Drive: 11 plays, 56 yards, 3:55.

Third quarter

- ASU – Chamon Metayer 27-yard pass from Sam Leavitt (Jesus Gomez kick), 8:35. Sun Devils 27–3. Drive: 13 plays, 79 yards, 6:12.
- TXST – Brad Jackson 7-yard run (pass failed), 2:29. Sun Devils 27–9. Drive: 15 plays, 59 yards, 5:59.
- ASU – Raleek Brown 75-yard run (Jesus Gomez kick), 2:17. Sun Devils 34–9. Drive: 1 play, 75 yards, 0:12.

Fourth quarter

- TXST – Kylen Evans 3-yard pass from Brad Jackson (pass failed), 5:26. Sun Devils 34–15. Drive: 14 plays, 51 yards, 5:18.

Statistics	TXST	ASU
First downs	21	21
Plays–yards	78–303	67–433
Rushes–yards	42–119	42–245
Passing yards	184	188
Passing: comp–att–int	25–36–0	15–25–0
Turnovers	2	0
Time of possession	29:17	30:43

Team	Category	Player	Statistics
Texas State	Passing	Brad Jackson	25/36, 184 yards, TD
Texas State	Rushing	Lincoln Pare	13 carries, 61 yards
Texas State	Receiving	Beau Sparks	10 receptions, 70 yards
Arizona State	Passing	Sam Leavitt	15/25, 188 yards, 2 TD
Arizona State	Rushing	Raleek Brown	12 carries, 144 yards, TD
Arizona State	Receiving	Jordyn Tyson	6 receptions, 105 yards, TD

=== at Baylor ===
Arizona State Sun Devils (2–1) at Baylor Bears (2–1) – Game summary

Quarter	1	2	3	4	Total
Sun Devils	3	7	3	14	27
Bears	3	7	0	14	24

at McLane Stadium • Waco, Texas

- Date: September 20
- Game time: 4:30 p.m.
- Game weather: Sunny • Temperature: 89 °F (32 °C) • Wind: SE 8 mph
- Game attendance: 40,964
- Referee: Kevin Boitmann
- TV announcers (FOX): Tim Brando (play-by-play), Devin Gardner (analyst), and Josh Sims (sideline)

Game information

First quarter

- (8:21) ASU – Jesus Gomez 31-yard field goal (Drive: 14 plays, 45 yards, 5:44; ASU 3–0)
- (4:08) BAY – Connor Hawkins 53-yard field goal (Drive: 11 plays, 51 yards, 4:13; Tied 3–3)

Second quarter

- (6:26) ASU – Sam Leavitt 1-yard run, Jesus Gomez kick (Drive: 13 plays, 83 yards, 6:15; ASU 10–3)
- (3:08) BAY – Kole Wilson 8-yard pass from Sawyer Robertson, Connor Hawkins kick (Drive: 7 plays, 73 yards, 3:12; Tied 10–10)

Third quarter

- (8:06) ASU – Jesus Gomez 21-yard field goal (Drive: 8 plays, 27 yards, 3:36; ASU 13–10)

Fourth quarter

- (13:35) ASU – Jesus Gomez 33-yard field goal (Drive: 5 plays, 21 yards, 1:47; ASU 16–10)
- (9:02) BAY – Michael Trigg 1-yard pass from Sawyer Robertson, Connor Hawkins kick (Drive: 10 plays, 75 yards, 4:33; BAY 17–16)
- (5:29) ASU – Jordon Tyson 19-yard pass from Sam Leavitt, Jordon Tyson pass from Sam Leavitt for 2-pt (Drive: 7 plays, 84 yards, 3:22; ASU 17–24)
- (1:52) BAY – Michael Trigg 33-yard pass from Sawyer Robertson, Connor Hawkins kick (Drive: 8 plays, 64 yards, 3:29; Tied 24–24)
- (00:00) ASU – Jesus Gomez 43-yard field goal (Drive: 11 plays, 49 yards, 1:52; ASU 27–24)

Statistics	ASU	BAY
First downs	26	28
Plays–yards	80–400	62–357
Rushes–yards	48–179	23–107
Passing yards	221	250
Passing: comp–att–int	22–32–0	25–39–1
Turnovers	0	3
Time of possession	36:35	23:25

Team	Category	Player	Statistics
Arizona State	Passing	Sam Leavitt	22/32, 221 yards, TD
Arizona State	Rushing	Raleek Brown	21 carries, 80 yards
Arizona State	Receiving	Derek Eusebio	2 receptions, 78 yards
Baylor	Passing	Sawyer Robertson	25/39, 250 yards, 3 TD, INT
Baylor	Rushing	Bryson Washington	17 carries, 111 yards
Baylor	Receiving	Michael Trigg	5 receptions, 71 yards, 2 TD

=== vs No. 24 TCU ===
No. 24 TCU Horned Frogs (3–0) at Arizona State Sun Devils (3–1) – Game summary

Quarter	1	2	3	4	Total
No. 24 Horned Frogs	7	10	7	0	24
Sun Devils	0	14	3	10	27

at Mountain America Stadium • Tempe, Arizona

- Date: September 26
- Game time: 8:00 p.m.
- Game weather: Sunny • Temperature: 72 °F (22 °C) • Wind: NE 15 mph
- Game attendance: 53,774
- Referee: Michael Vandervelde
- TV announcers (FOX): Tim Brando (play-by-play), Devin Gardner (analyst), and Josh Sims (sideline)

Game information

First quarter

- TCU – Trent Battle 13-yard run (Nate McCashland kick), 3:11. Horned Frogs 7–0. Drive: 7 plays, 51 yards, 3:08.

Second quarter

- TCU – Jeremy Payne 7-yard run (Nate McCashland kick), 10:22. Horned Frogs 14–0. Drive: 8 plays, 71 yards, 3:51.
- TCU – Nate McCashland 27-yard field goal, 6:24. Horned Frogs 17–0. Drive: 6 plays, 29 yards, 2:00.
- ASU – Jordyn Tyson 57-yard pass from Sam Leavitt (Jesús Gómez kick), 4:51. Horned Frogs 17–7. Drive: 3 plays, 65 yards, 1:23.
- ASU – Sam Leavitt 8-yard run (Jesús Gómez kick), 1:56. Horned Frogs 17–14. Drive: 5 plays, 47 yards, 1:37.

Third quarter

- ASU – Jesús Gómez 26-yard field goal, 7:00. Tied 17–17. Drive: 12 plays, 83 yards, 5:40.
- TCU – Josh Hoover 1-yard run (Nate McCashland kick), 4:02. Horned Frogs 24–17. Drive: 8 plays, 65 yards, 2:58.

Fourth quarter

- ASU – Jordyn Tyson 4-yard pass from Sam Leavitt (Jesús Gómez kick), 1:50. Tied 24–24. Drive: 11 plays, 73 yards, 3:52.
- ASU – Jesús Gómez 23-yard field goal, 1:14. Sun Devils 27–24. Drive: 5 plays, 9 yards, 0:28.

Statistics	TCU	ASU
First downs	15	25
Plays–yards	57–271	81–500
Rushes–yards	24–12	42–209
Passing yards	259	291
Passing: comp–att–int	21–33–2	27–39–0
Turnovers	3	1
Time of possession	24:13	35:47

Team	Category	Player	Statistics
TCU	Passing	Josh Hoover	20/32, 242 yards, 2 INT
TCU	Rushing	Trent Battle	9 carries, 30 yards, TD
TCU	Receiving	Joseph Manjack IV	6 receptions, 83 yards
Arizona State	Passing	Sam Leavitt	27/39, 291 yards, 2 TD
Arizona State	Rushing	Raleek Brown	21 carries, 134 yards
Arizona State	Receiving	Jordyn Tyson	8 receptions, 126 yards, 2 TD

=== at Utah ===
No. 21 Arizona State Sun Devils (4–1) at Utah Utes (4–1) – Game summary

Quarter	1	2	3	4	Total
No. 21 Sun Devils	3	0	7	0	10
Utes	7	14	14	7	42

at Rice–Eccles Stadium • Salt Lake City, Utah

- Date: October 11
- Game time: 7:25 p.m.
- Game weather: Rain • Temperature: 40 °F (4 °C) • Wind: N 9 mph
- Game attendance: 51,444
- Referee: Kevin Mar
- TV announcers (ESPN): Dave Flemming (play-by-play), Brock Osweiler (analyst), and Stormy Buonantony (sideline)

Game information

First quarter

- UTAH – Devon Dampier 12-yard run (Dillon Curtis kick), 9:56. Utes 7–0. Drive: 15 plays, 75 yards, 5:04.
- ASU – Jesus Gomez 38-yard field goal, 2:34. Utes 7–3. Drive: 18 plays, 54 yards, 7:22.

Second quarter

- UTAH – Devon Dampier 24-yard run (Dillon Curtis kick), 11:27. Utes 14–3. Drive: 8 plays, 59 yards, 3:05.
- UTAH – NaQuari Rogers 22-yard run (Dillon Curtis kick), 1:04. Utes 21–3. Drive: 6 plays, 75 yards, 2:01.

Third quarter

- UTAH – NaQuari Rogers 2-yard run (Dillon Curtis kick), 11:00. Utes 28–3. Drive: 6 plays, 68 yards, 2:36.
- ASU – Jordyn Tyson 3-yard run (Jesus Gomez kick), 4:32. Utes 28–10. Drive: 13 plays, 75 yards, 6:28.
- UTAH – Devon Dampier 9-yard run (Dillon Curtis kick), 0:45. Utes 35–10. Drive: 8 plays, 64 yards, 3:42.

Fourth quarter

- UTAH – Byrd Ficklin 4-yard run (Dillon Curtis kick), 10:05. Utes 42–10. Drive: 4 plays, 42 yards, 1:44.

Statistics	ASU	UTAH
First downs	23	23
Plays–yards	78–259	55–412
Rushes–yards	40–135	42–276
Passing yards	124	136
Passing: comp–att–int	18–38–0	8–13–0
Turnovers	0	0
Time of possession	36:26	23:34

Team	Category	Player	Statistics
Arizona State	Passing	Jeff Sims	18/38, 124 yards
Arizona State	Rushing	Raleek Brown	14 carries, 67 yards
Arizona State	Receiving	Jordyn Tyson	8 receptions, 40 yards
Utah	Passing	Devon Dampier	7/12, 104 yards
Utah	Rushing	Devon Dampier	10 carries, 120 yards, 3 TD
Utah	Receiving	Ryan Davis	3 receptions, 68 yards

=== vs No. 7 Texas Tech ===
No. 7 Texas Tech Red Raiders (6–0) at Arizona State Sun Devils (4–2) – Game summary

Quarter	1	2	3	4	Total
No. 7 Red Raiders	0	7	0	15	22
Sun Devils	3	6	7	10	26

at Mountain America Stadium • Tempe, Arizona

- Date: October 18
- Game time: 1:00 p.m.
- Game weather: Clear, 81 °F (27 °C)
- Game attendance: 54,117
- Referee: Luke Richmond
- TV announcers (FOX): Connor Onion (play-by-play, Mark Helfrich (analyst), and Jen Hale (sideline)

Game information

First quarter

- ASU – Jesus Gomez 34-yard field goal, 1:43. Sun Devils 3–0. Drive: 9 plays, 62 yards, 4:08.

Second quarter

- ASU – Jesus Gomez 47-yard field goal, 14:00. Sun Devils 6–0. Drive: 5 plays, 33 yards, 1:30.
- TTU – Coy Eakin 30-yard pass from Will Hammond (Stone Harrington kick), 5:57. Red Raiders 7–6. Drive: 5 plays, 45 yards, 2:21.
- ASU – Jesus Gomez 26-yard field goal, 1:43. Sun Devils 9–7. Drive: 10 plays, 66 yards, 4:14.

Third quarter

- ASU – Jordyn Tyson 2-yard pass from Sam Leavitt (Jesus Gomez kick), 8:50. Sun Devils 16–7. Drive: 7 plays, 21 yards, 3:41.

Fourth quarter

- ASU – Jesus Gomez 28-yard field goal, 14:14. Sun Devils 19–7. Drive: 16 plays, 69 yards, 8:20.
- TTU – Will Hammond 1-yard run (Upton Bellenfant kick), 3:45. Sun Devils 19–14. Drive: 11 plays, 48 yards, 3:36.
- TTU – Reggie Virgil 12-yard pass from Will Hammond (Will Hammond run), 2:00. Red Raiders 22–19. Drive: 1 play, 12 yards, 0:05.
- ASU – Raleek Brown 1-yard run (Jesus Gomez kick), 0:34. Sun Devils 26–22. Drive: 10 plays, 75 yards, 1:26.

Statistics	TTU	ASU
First downs	16	21
Plays–yards	65–276	83–394
Rushes–yards	27–109	36–75
Passing yards	167	319
Passing: comp–att–int	22–38–1	28–47–0
Turnovers	1	0
Time of possession	22:48	37:12

Team	Category	Player	Statistics
Texas Tech	Passing	Will Hammond	22/37, 167 yards, 2 TD, INT
Texas Tech	Rushing	Will Hammond	15 carries, 47 yards, TD
Texas Tech	Receiving	Coy Eakin	5 receptions, 66 yards, TD
Arizona State	Passing	Sam Leavitt	28/47, 319 yards, TD
Arizona State	Rushing	Raleek Brown	19 carries, 69 yards, TD
Arizona State	Receiving	Jordyn Tyson	10 receptions, 105 yards, TD

=== vs Houston ===
Houston Cougars (6–1) at No. 24 Arizona State Sun Devils (5–2) – Game summary

Quarter	1	2	3	4	Total
Cougars	10	0	14	0	24
No. 24 Sun Devils	0	0	0	16	16

at Mountain America Stadium • Tempe, Arizona

- Date: October 25
- Game time: 5:00 p.m.
- Game weather: Sunny • Temperature: 84 °F (29 °C) • Wind: W 3 mph
- Game attendance: 54,256
- Referee: Stephen Baron
- TV announcers (ESPN2): Lowell Galindo (play-by-play), Aaron Murray (analyst), and Lauren Sisler (sideline)

Game information

First quarter

- (10:29) HOU - Ethan Sanchez 26-yard field goal (Drive: 10 plays, 68 yards, 4:31; Houston 3-0)
- (0:41) HOU - Conner Weigman 1-yard run, Ethan Sanchez kick (Drive: 6 plays, 57 yards, 3:14; Houston 10-0)

Second quarter

- No scoring plays.

Third quarter

- (10:10) HOU - Tanner Koziol 7-yard pass from Conner Weigman, Ethan Sanchez kick (Drive: 6 plays, 57 yards, 3:14; Houston 17-0)
- (1:06) HOU - Conner Weigman 1-yard run, Ethan Sanchez kick (Drive: 10 plays, 75 yards, 4:43; Houston 24-0)

Fourth quarter

- (13:56) ASU - Cameron Harpole 3-yard pass from Sam Leavitt, two-point pass conversion failed (Drive: 8 plays, 75 yards, 2:12; Houston 24-6)
- (11:24) ASU - Jesus Gomez 47-yard field goal (Drive: 8 plays, 50 yards, 1:09; Houston 24-9)
- (5:12) ASU - Chamon Metayer 27-yard pass from Jeff Sims, Jesus Gomez kick (Drive: 7 plays, 70 yards, 2:03; Houston 24-16)

Statistics	HOU	ASU
First downs	22	19
Plays–yards	70–384	67–426
Rushes–yards	48–183	21–98
Passing yards	201	328
Passing: comp–att–int	17–22–0	24–46–0
Turnovers	0	1
Time of possession	37:02	22:58

Team	Category	Player	Statistics
Houston	Passing	Conner Weigman	17/22, 201 yards, TD
Houston	Rushing	Conner Weigman	21 carries, 111 yards, 2 TD
Houston	Receiving	Tanner Koziol	7 receptions, 100 yards, TD
Arizona State	Passing	Sam Leavitt	18/35, 270 yards, TD
Arizona State	Rushing	Raleek Brown	11 carries, 64 yards
Arizona State	Receiving	Malik McClain	7 receptions, 159 yards

=== at Iowa State ===
Arizona State Sun Devils (5–3) at Iowa State Cyclones (5–3) – Game summary

Quarter	1	2	3	4	Total
Sun Devils	3	14	7	0	24
Cyclones	3	13	3	0	19

at Jack Trice Stadium • Ames, Iowa

- Date: November 1
- Game time: 10:00 a.m.
- Game weather:
- Game attendance: 60,899
- Referee:
- TV announcers (TNT/TruTV): J.B. Long (play-by-play), Mike Golic Jr. (analyst) and Bridget Howard (sideline)

Game information

First quarter

- ISU – Kyle Konrardy 30-yard field goal, 5:45. Cyclones 3–0. Drive: 6 plays, 32 yards, 3:17.
- ASU – Jesus Gomez 35-yard field goal, 0:54. Tied 3–3. Drive: 11 plays, 55 yards, 4:45.

Second quarter

- ISU – Rocco Becht 7-yard run (Kyle Konrardy kick), 12:45. Cyclones 10–3. Drive: 8 plays, 71 yards, 3:06.
- ASU – Jeff Sims 8-yard run (Jesus Gomez kick), 10:43. Tied 10–10. Drive: 4 plays, 88 yards, 1:56.
- ASU – Chamon Metayer 18-yard pass from Jeff Sims (Jesus Gomez kick), 4:55. Sun Devils 17–10. Drive: 8 plays, 56 yards, 3:36.
- ISU – Benjamin Brahmer 17-yard pass from Rocco Becht (Kyle Konrardy kick failed), 1:01. Sun Devils 17–16. Drive: 2 plays, 24 yards, 0:30.

Third quarter

- ASU – Jeff Sims 88-yard run (Jesus Gomez kick), 7:47. Sun Devils 24–16. Drive: 3 plays, 94 yards, 1:24.
- ISU – Kyle Konrardy 35-yard field goal, 0:01. Sun Devils 24–19. Drive: 9 plays, 76 yards, 4:34.

Fourth quarter

- No scoring plays.

Statistics	ASU	ISU
First downs	20	21
Plays–yards	70–467	69–336
Rushes–yards	46–290	32–150
Passing yards	177	186
Passing: comp–att–int	13–24–1	18–37–1
Turnovers	3	1
Time of possession	32:04	27:56

Team	Category	Player	Statistics
Arizona State	Passing	Jeff Sims	13/24, 177 yards, TD, INT
Arizona State	Rushing	Jeff Sims	29 carries, 228 yards, 2 TD
Arizona State	Receiving	Chamon Metayer	6 receptions, 68 yards, TD
Iowa State	Passing	Rocco Becht	18/36, 186 yards, TD, INT
Iowa State	Rushing	Carson Hansen	18 carries, 113 yards
Iowa State	Receiving	Chase Sowell	6 receptions, 85 yards

=== vs West Virginia ===
West Virginia Mountaineers (4-6) at Arizona State Sun Devils (6–3) – Game summary

Quarter	1	2	3	4	Total
Mountaineers	3	7	0	13	23
Sun Devils	0	22	0	3	25

at Mountain America Stadium • Tempe, Arizona

- Date: November 15
- Game time: 11:00 a.m.
- Game weather:
- Game attendance: 54,101
- Referee: Steven Heiman
- TV announcers (TNT/HBO Max): J.B. Long (play-by-play), Mike Golic Jr. (analyst) and Coy Wire (sideline)

Game information

First quarter

- WVU – Kade Hensley 29-yard field goal, 8:41. Mountaineers 3–0. Drive: 11 plays, 57 yards, 4:25.

Second quarter

- ASU – Chamon Metayer 6-yard pass from Jeff Sims (Jesus Gomez kick), 11:17. Sun Devils 7–3. Drive: 10 plays, 94 yards, 5:09.
- ASU – Derek Eusebio 19-yard pass from Jeff Sims (Jesus Gomez–Cameron Harpole pass), 8:04. Sun Devils 15–3. Drive: 4 plays, 40 yards, 1:48.
- WVU – Jeff Weimer 75-yard pass from Scotty Fox Jr. (Kade Hensley kick), 7:53. Sun Devils 15–10. Drive: 1 play, 75 yards, 0:11.
- ASU – Raleek Brown 33-yard pass from Jeff Sims (Jesus Gomez kick), 1:41. Sun Devils 22–10. Drive: 8 plays, 69 yards, 2:49.

Third quarter

- No scoring plays.

Fourth quarter

- WVU – Curtis Jones Jr. 1-yard run (Kade Hensley kick), 10:41. Sun Devils 22–17. Drive: 10 plays, 72 yards, 3:26.
- WVU – Cyncir Bowers 90-yard pass from Scotty Fox Jr. (run failed), 6:37. Mountaineers 23–22. Drive: 3 plays, 73 yards, 1:29.
- ASU – Jesus Gomez 49-yard field goal, 2:44. Sun Devils 25–23. Drive: 8 plays, 40 yards, 3:47.

Statistics	WVU	ASU
First downs	20	18
Plays–yards	70–421	67–330
Rushes–yards	39–68	39–123
Passing yards	353	207
Passing: comp–att–int	19–31–1	19–28–0
Turnovers	1	1
Time of possession	27:26	32:34

Team	Category	Player	Statistics
West Virginia	Passing	Scotty Fox Jr.	19/31, 353 yards, 2 TD, INT
West Virginia	Rushing	Cyncir Bowers	13 carries, 42 yards
West Virginia	Receiving	Jeff Weimer	3 receptions, 90 yards, TD
Arizona State	Passing	Jeff Sims	19/28, 207 yards, 3 TD
Arizona State	Rushing	Jeff Sims	17 carries, 81 yards
Arizona State	Receiving	Derek Eusebio	6 receptions, 74 yards, TD

=== at Colorado ===
No. 25 Arizona State Sun Devils (7–3) at Colorado Buffaloes (3–7) – Game summary

Quarter	1	2	3	4	Total
No. 25 Sun Devils	3	10	8	21	42
Buffaloes	7	0	10	0	17

at Folsom Field • Boulder, Colorado

- Date: November 22
- Game time: 6:00 p.m. MDT
- Game weather: Clear; 46 °F (8 °C)
- Game attendance: 43,348
- Referee: Henry Johns
- TV announcers (ESPN2): Mike Monaco (play-by-play), Kirk Morrison (analyst), and Dawn Davenport (sideline)

Game information

First quarter

- (9:23) ASU – Jesús Gómez 39-yard field goal (Drive: 8 plays, 59 yards, 2:44; Arizona State 3–0)
- (0:03) COL – Dallan Hayden 7-yard run, Alejandro Mata kick (Drive: 4 plays, 57 yards, 1:47; Colorado 7–3)

Second quarter

- (3:19) ASU – Raleek Brown 33-yard pass from Jeff Sims, Jesús Gómez kick (Drive: 8 plays, 77 yards, 5:05; Arizona State 10–7)
- (0:05) ASU – Jesús Gómez 39-yard field goal (Drive: 6 plays, 63 yards, 0:56; Arizona State 13–7)

Third quarter

- (12:02) COL – Omarion Miller 22-yard pass from Julian Lewis, Alejandro Mata kick (Drive: 6 plays, 79 yards, 2:53; Colorado 14–13)
- (10:35) ASU – Derek Eusebio 68-yard pass from Jeff Sims, Khamari Anderson pass for two-point conversion (Drive: 3 plays, 75 yards, 1:27; Arizona State 21–14)
- (5:25) COL – Alejandro Mata 28-yard field goal (Drive: 4 plays, -1 yards, 2:07; Arizona State 21–17)

Fourth quarter

- (13:31) ASU – Raleek Brown 88-yard run, Jesús Gómez kick (Drive: 1 plays, 88 yards, 0:13; Arizona State 28–17)
- (8:48) ASU – Kanye Udoh 3-yard run, Jesús Gómez kick (Drive: 6 plays, 74 yards, 2:59; Arizona State 35–17)
- (1:20) ASU – Jason Brown Jr. 3-yard run, Jesús Gómez kick (Drive: 10 plays, 76 yards, 6:34; Arizona State 42–17)

Statistics	ASU	COLO
First downs	23	12
Plays–yards	71–580	69–300
Rushes–yards	45–355	30–135
Passing yards	225	165
Passing: comp–att–int	12–26–1	20–39–0
Turnovers	4	1
Time of possession	33:08	26:52

Team	Category	Player	Statistics
Arizona State	Passing	Jeff Sims	11/24, 206 yards, 2 TD, INT
Arizona State	Rushing	Raleek Brown	22 carries, 255 yards, TD
Arizona State	Receiving	Derek Eusebio	4 receptions, 87 yards, TD
Colorado	Passing	Julian Lewis	19/38, 161 yards, TD
Colorado	Rushing	Dallan Hayden	10 carries, 65 yards, TD
Colorado	Receiving	Sincere Brown	3 receptions, 50 yards

=== vs No. 25 Arizona (Territorial Cup) ===
No. 25 Arizona Wildcats (8–3) at No. 20 Arizona State Sun Devils (8–3) – Game summary
Territorial Cup Series

Quarter	1	2	3	4	Total
No. 25 Wildcats	0	3	10	10	23
No. 20 Sun Devils	0	7	0	0	7

at Mountain America Stadium • Tempe, Arizona

- Date: November 28
- Game time: 7:00 p.m. MST
- Game weather: Clear • 67 °F (19 °C) • Wind: WSW at 2 mph (3.2 km/h)
- Game attendance: 54,037
- Referee: Eric Carmouche
- TV announcers (FOX): Tim Brando (play-by-play), Devin Gardner (analyst), and Josh Sims (sideline)

Game information

First quarter

- No scoring plays.

Second quarter

- (10:33) ASU – Jeff Sims 27-yard run, Jesus Gomez kick (Drive: 8 plays, 90 yards, 3:53; Arizona State 7–0)
- (0:01) ARIZ – Michael Salgado-Medina 47-yard field goal (Drive: 7 plays, 40 yards, 1:18; Arizona State 7–3)

Third quarter

- (11:36) ARIZ – Cameron Barmore 9-yard pass from Noah Fifita, Michael Salgado-Medina kick (Drive: 2 plays, 6 yards, 0:46; Arizona 10–7)
- (1:17) ARIZ – Michael Salgado-Medina 49-yard field goal (Drive: 16 plays, 63 yards, 6:00; Arizona 13–7)

Fourth quarter

- (12:05) ARIZ – Michael Salgado-Medina 29-yard field goal (Drive: 8 plays, 49 yards, 2:36; Arizona 16–7)
- (1:56) ARIZ – Kedrick Reescano 1-yard run, Michael Salgado-Medina kick (Drive: 14 plays, 87 yards, 6:15; Arizona 23–7)

Statistics	ARIZ	ASU
First downs	24	12
Plays–yards	89–374	52–214
Rushes–yards	44–88	27–100
Passing yards	286	114
Passing: comp–att–int	28–45–0	11–25–3
Turnovers	1	5
Time of possession	40:01	19:59

Team	Category	Player	Statistics
Arizona	Passing	Noah Fifita	28/45, 286 yards, TD
Arizona	Rushing	Ismail Mahdi	14 carries, 53 yards
Arizona	Receiving	Kris Hutson	7 receptions, 95 yards
Arizona State	Passing	Jeff Sims	11/25, 114 yards, 3 INT
Arizona State	Rushing	Raleek Brown	13 carries, 63 yards
Arizona State	Receiving	Malik McClain	4 receptions, 57 yards

=== vs. Duke (Sun Bowl) ===
2025 Tony the Tiger Sun Bowl
Arizona State Sun Devils (8–4) vs. Duke Blue Devils (8–5) – Game summary

Quarter	1	2	3	4	Total
Sun Devils	14	10	8	7	39
Blue Devils	14	14	7	7	42

at Sun Bowl • El Paso, TX

- Date: December 31
- Game time: 12:00 p.m. MDT
- Game weather: Sunny • Temperature: 55 °F (13 °C) • Wind: 2 mph (3.2 km/h) north
- Game attendance: 44,975
- Referee: Tim O'Dey
- TV announcers (CBS): Brad Nessler (play-by-play), Gary Danielson (analyst), and Jenny Dell (sideline)

Game information

First quarter

- ASU – Jeff Sims 4-yard run (Jesus Gomez kick), 10:11. Sun Devils 7–0. Drive: 9 plays, 83 yards, 2:57.
- DUKE – Que'Sean Brown 69-yard pass from Darian Mensah (Todd Pelino kick), 8:53. Tied 7–7. Drive: 3 plays, 75 yards, 1:18.
- DUKE – Cooper Barkate 3-yard pass from Darian Mensah (Todd Pelino kick), 6:43. Blue Devils 14–7. Drive: 4 plays, 49 yards, 0:43.
- ASU – Jalen Moss 44-yard pass from Jeff Sims (Jesus Gomez kick), 5:05. Tied 14–14. Drive: 5 plays, 75 yards, 1:38.

Second quarter

- DUKE – Jeremiah Hasley 14-yard pass from Darian Mensah (Todd Pelino kick), 6:06. Blue Devils 21–14. Drive: 12 plays, 60 yards, 5:22.
- ASU – Jeff Sims 38-yard run (Jesus Gomez kick), 3:49. Tied 21–21. Drive: 6 plays, 75 yards, 2:17.
- DUKE – Anderson Castle 3-yard run (Todd Pelino kick), 1:50. Blue Devils 28–21. Drive: 5 plays, 44 yards, 1:59.
- ASU – Jesus Gomez 54-yard field goal, 0:32. Blue Devils 28–24. Drive: 6 plays, 24 yards, 1:18.

Third quarter

- DUKE – Nate Sheppard 3-yard run (Todd Pelino kick), 5:20. Blue Devils 35–24. Drive: 7 plays, 64 yards, 3:06.
- ASU – Khamari Anderson 8-yard pass from Jeff Sims (Jeff Sims run), 4:09. Blue Devils 35–32. Drive: 4 plays, 75 yards, 1:11.

Fourth quarter

- ASU – Malik McClain 6-yard pass from Jeff Sims (Jesus Gomez kick), 12:31. Sun Devils 39–35. Drive: 7 plays, 77 yards, 2:29.
- DUKE – Que'Sean Brown 17-yard pass from Darian Mensah (Todd Pelino kick), 2:10. Blue Devils 39–35. Drive: 2 plays, 22 yards, 0:32.

Statistics	ASU	DUKE
First downs	22	24
Plays–yards	75–619	87–539
Rushes–yards	37–244	36–212
Passing yards	375	327
Passing: comp–att–int	27–38–1	29–51–1
Turnovers	3	1
Time of possession	26:33	33:07

Team	Category	Player	Statistics
Arizona State	Passing	Jeff Sims	27/38, 375 yards, 3 TD, INT
Arizona State	Rushing	Jason Brown Jr.	13 carries, 134 yards
Arizona State	Receiving	Jalen Moss	5 receptions, 129 yards, TD
Duke	Passing	Darian Mensah	29/51, 327 yards, 4 TD, INT
Duke	Rushing	Nate Sheppard	22 carries, 170 yards, TD
Duke	Receiving	Que'Sean Brown	10 receptions, 178 yards, 2 TD
