= Jordyn Tyson =

American football player (born 2004)

No. 0 – New Orleans Saints
- Position: Wide receiver
- Roster status: Active

Personal information
- Born: August 12, 2004 (age 22); Allen, Texas, U.S.
- Listed height: 6 ft 2 in (1.88 m)
- Listed weight: 203 lb (92 kg)

Career information
- High school: Allen
- College: Colorado (2022); Arizona State (2023–2025)
- NFL draft: 2026: 1st round, 8th overall pick

Career history
- New Orleans Saints (2026–present)

Awards and highlights
- Big 12 Offensive Newcomer of the Year (2024); 2× First-team All-Big 12 (2024, 2025)

Career NFL statistics as of Week 9, 2026
- Receptions: 4
- Receiving yards: 30
- Stats at Pro Football Reference

Jordyn Tyson (born August 12, 2004) is an American professional football wide receiver for the New Orleans Saints of the National Football League (NFL). Tyson played college football for the Colorado Buffaloes and Arizona State Sun Devils and was selected eighth overall by the Saints in the 2026 NFL draft.

== Early life ==
Tyson was born on August 12, 2004, in Allen, Texas. He attended Allen High School in his freshman, sophomore and senior years and Independence High School in Frisco, Texas his junior year. As a senior, Tyson had 80 receptions for 1,512 yards and 12 touchdowns. He committed to the University of Colorado Boulder to play college football.

== College career ==
Tyson played nine games in his lone year at Colorado in 2022, recording 22 receptions for a team leading 470 yards and five touchdowns. After the season he entered the transfer portal and transferred to Arizona State University. In his first year at Arizona State in 2023 he played in only three games due to injury and did not record a catch. Tyson returned to Arizona State in 2024 as the team's number one receiver.

Tyson made nine appearances for Arizona State during the 2025 season, recording 61 receptions for 711 yards and eight touchdowns. On December 19, 2025, Tyson declared for the 2026 NFL draft.

=== Statistics ===
Year	Team	GP	Receiving			
Year	Team	GP	Rec	Yds	Avg	TD
2022	Colorado	9	22	470	21.4	4
2023	Arizona State	3	0	0	–	0
2024	Arizona State	12	75	1,101	14.7	10
2025	Arizona State	9	61	711	11.7	8
Career		33	158	2,282	14.4	22

== Professional career ==
Pre-draft measurables
Height	Weight	Arm length	Hand span	Wingspan	Bench press
6 ft 2 1/8 in (1.88 m)	203 lb (92 kg)	30 1/4 in (0.77 m)	9 1/8 in (0.23 m)	6 ft 3 1/4 in (1.91 m)	26 reps
All values from NFL Combine

Tyson was selected by the New Orleans Saints in the first round, eighth overall, of the 2026 NFL draft. On May 8, 2026, he signed a four-year, $32.49 million contract with the Saints. On August 17, Tyson sustained a hamstring injury during practice and was ruled out for at least two months. On August 30, Tyson was placed on injured reserve with a designation to return. He was activated on November 7.

== Personal life ==
Tyson’s older brother Berron played college football at South Alabama, where he now serves as a strength and conditioning coach, while his older brother Jaylon plays for the Cleveland Cavaliers of the National Basketball Association (NBA). His father John Tyson played football at Florida A&M.

Tyson is a Christian. He was baptized in March 2025.
