= Chamon Metayer =

American football player (born 2002)

Profile
- Position: Tight end

Personal information
- Born: December 2, 2002 (age 23); North Miami, Florida, U.S.
- Listed height: 6 ft 4 in (1.93 m)
- Listed weight: 262 lb (119 kg)

Career information
- High school: Miami Northwestern (Miami, Florida)
- College: Cincinnati (2021–2023); Colorado (2024); Arizona State (2024–2025)
- NFL draft: 2026: undrafted

Career history
- Pittsburgh Steelers (2026)*; Carolina Panthers (2026)*
- * Offseason or practice squad member only

Awards and highlights
- Second-team All-Big 12 (2024)
- Stats at Pro Football Reference

Chamon Metayer (born December 2, 2002) is an American professional football tight end. He played college football for the Arizona State Sun Devils, Cincinnati Bearcats, and Colorado Buffaloes.

== Early life ==
Metayer attended Miami Northwestern Senior High School in Miami, Florida. Coming out of high school, he was rated as a three-star recruit and committed to play college football for the Miami Hurricanes. However, Metayer ultimately de-committed and sign to play for the Cincinnati Bearcats.

== College career ==
=== Cincinnati ===
In week 5 of the 2023 season, he recorded three receptions for 59 yards and two touchdowns in a loss versus BYU. In three years as a Bearcat from 2021 to 2023, he totaled 29 catches for 290 yards and five touchdowns, while also recording 27 rushing yards. After the 2023 season, he entered his name into the NCAA transfer portal.

=== Colorado ===
Metayer initially transferred to play for the Colorado Buffaloes, but after enrolling and going through spring practices he re-entered the transfer portal.

=== Arizona State ===
Metayer then transferred to play for the Arizona State Sun Devils. In 2024, he notched 32 receptions for 306 yards and five touchdowns. Ahead of the 2025 season, Metayer was named to the Preseason John Mackey Award watchlist. In week 3 of the 2025 season, Metayer hauled in six passes for 60 yards and a touchdown in a victory over Texas State. After the 2025 season, he declared for the 2026 NFL draft.

=== Statistics ===
Year	Team	GP	Receiving			
Year	Team	GP	Rec	Yds	Avg	TD
2021	Cincinnati	0	Did not play			
2022	Cincinnati	6	1	32	32.0	0
2023	Cincinnati	11	23	258	11.2	5
2024	Arizona State	14	32	306	9.6	5
2025	Arizona State	12	38	375	9.9	4
Career		43	94	971	10.3	14

== Professional career ==
Pre-draft measurables
Height	Weight	Arm length	Hand span	Wingspan	20-yard shuttle	Three-cone drill	Vertical jump	Broad jump	Bench press
6 ft 3 7/8 in (1.93 m)	262 lb (119 kg)	33 1/2 in (0.85 m)	9 7/8 in (0.25 m)	6 ft 7 in (2.01 m)	4.75 s	7.68 s	34.5 in (0.88 m)	9 ft 10 in (3.00 m)	13 reps
All values from Pro Day

=== Pittsburgh Steelers ===
On April 27, 2026, after going undrafted in the 2026 NFL draft, Metayer signed with the Pittsburgh Steelers as an undrafted free agent. He was released by the Steelers on June 4.

=== Carolina Panthers ===
On July 31, 2026, Metayer signed with the Carolina Panthers. He was waived by Carolina on August 10.
