= Myles Rowser =

American football player (born 2004)

- Rowser in 2025

Houston Cougars
- Position: Safety

Personal information
- Born: August 9, 2004 (age 22)
- Listed height: 6 ft 0 in (1.83 m)
- Listed weight: 194 lb (88 kg)

Career information
- High school: Belleville (Belleville, Michigan)
- College: Campbell (2022); New Mexico State (2023); Arizona State (2024–2025); Houston (2026–present)

Awards and highlights
- Third-team All-Big 12 (2025)
- Stats at ESPN

Myles A. "Ghost" Rowser (born August 9, 2004) is an American college football safety for the Houston Cougars. He previously played at Campbell, New Mexico State, and Arizona State.

== Early life ==
Rowser played high school football at Belleville High School and started several games at safety during his freshman year. On January 13, 2020, Rowser committed to play college football at Michigan but decommitted just four months later on April 30. Rowser committed to play college football for Arkansas on March 28, 2021. He played only two games during his senior season due to injury. On National Signing Day, Rowser flipped his commitment to Campbell, an FCS school, despite holding offers from almost 30 FBS schools. Rowser was Campbell's highest rated recruit in school history. Over his high school career, he totaled 196 tackles, six interceptions, 29 pass deflections, three forced fumbles, and two touchdowns.

College recruiting
Name	Hometown	School	Height	Weight	Commit date
Myles Rowser; S	Detroit, Michigan	Belleville	6 ft 0 in (1.83 m)	185 lb (84 kg)	Feb 2, 2022
Myles Rowser; S	Recruit ratings: Rivals: 247Sports: ESPN: (80)				

== College career ==
=== Campbell ===
During his first season at Campbell, Rowser earned Freshman All-American honors while appearing in nine games for the Camels. Following his freshman season, Rowser entered his name into the transfer portal.

=== New Mexico State ===
On May 26, 2023, Rowser transferred to New Mexico State. During the 2023 season, he was the Aggies' second-leading tackler and helped them to the Conference USA Championship Game. Following the season, Rowser again entered the transfer portal.

=== Arizona State ===
On January 7, 2024, Rowser transferred to Arizona State. Rowser started all 14 games for the Sun Devils during the 2024 season and led the team in tackles. For his performance, he was recognized as a Big 12 Honorable Mention selection. During the 2025 season, Rowser appeared in every game for the Sun Devils. On December 16, 2025, Rowser declared for the 2026 NFL draft.

=== Houston ===
In August 2026, Rowser signed with the Houston Cougars. On October 7, 2026, Rowser was cleared to play for the Cougars.

=== College statistics ===
Season	Team	Games		Tackles					Interceptions					Fumbles		
Season	Team	GP	GS	Solo	Ast	Cmb	TfL	Sck	Int	Yds	Avg	TD	PD	FF	FR	TD
2022	Campbell	10	5	33	11	44	1.0	0.0	1	5	5.0	0	4	0	1	0
2023	New Mexico State	15	11	42	27	69	0.0	0.0	1	31	31.0	0	4	1	0	0
2024	Arizona State	14	14	51	47	98	3.5	1.0	0	0	0.0	0	5	0	0	0
2025	Arizona State	13	11	48	36	84	4.0	0.0	0	0	0.0	0	3	0	1	0
Career		52	41	174	121	295	8.5	1.0	2	36	18.0	0	16	1	2	0

== Professional career ==
Pre-draft measurables
Height	Weight	Arm length	Hand span	Wingspan	40-yard dash	10-yard split	20-yard split	20-yard shuttle	Three-cone drill	Vertical jump	Broad jump
5 ft 11 7/8 in (1.83 m)	194 lb (88 kg)	31 3/4 in (0.81 m)	8 5/8 in (0.22 m)	6 ft 5 in (1.96 m)	4.67 s	1.63 s	2.76 s	4.73 s	7.65 s	29.0 in (0.74 m)	10 ft 3 in (3.12 m)
All values from Pro Day

After going undrafted in the 2026 NFL draft, Rowser accepted an invitation to the Seattle Seahawks rookie minicamp.

In August 2026, Rowser began seeking a fifth year of college eligibility as part of a class-wide preliminary injunction against the NCAA in hopes he could make a return to college football.

== Personal life ==
Rowser was born and raised in Detroit, Michigan. His parents are Autumn and Andre Seldon Sr. He has one living sibling, Morgan Rowser. Rowser's biological father Walter Lee Rowser Jr. passed away in 2009. His half-brother was Utah State defensive back Andre Seldon Jr. He is the great nephew of the Super Bowl-winning defensive back John Rowser.
