= Keith Abney II =

American football player (born 2005)

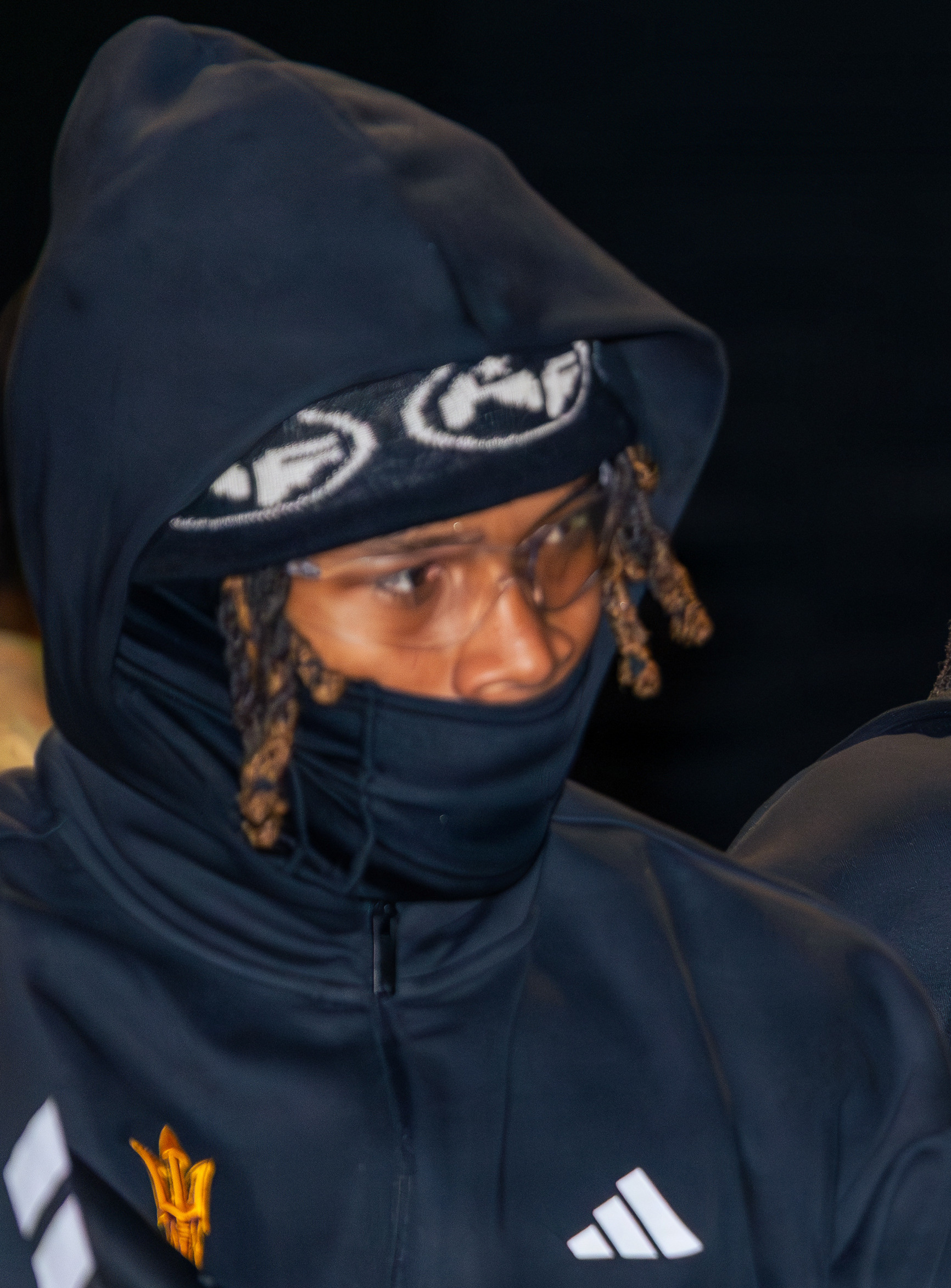
- Abney II with Arizona State in 2025

No. 6 – Detroit Lions
- Position: Cornerback/Safety
- Roster status: Active

Personal information
- Born: January 11, 2005 (age 21); Dallas, Texas, U.S.
- Listed height: 5 ft 9 in (1.75 m)
- Listed weight: 187 lb (85 kg)

Career information
- High school: Waxahachie (Waxahachie, Texas)
- College: Arizona State (2023–2025)
- NFL draft: 2026: 5th round, 157th overall pick

Career history
- Detroit Lions (2026–present)

Awards and highlights
- First-team All-Big 12 (2025); Second-team All-Big 12 (2024)

Career NFL statistics as of Week 3, 2026
- Tackles: 2
- Stats at Pro Football Reference

Keith Abney II (born January 11, 2005) is an American professional football cornerback and safety for the Detroit Lions of the National Football League (NFL). He played college football for the Arizona State Sun Devils and was selected by the Lions in the fifth round of the 2026 NFL draft.

== Early life ==
Abney II attended high school at Waxahachie located in Waxahachie, Texas. Coming out of high school, he was rated as a three star recruit, where he committed to play college football for the Utah State Aggies over other offers from schools such as Boston College, Army, Air Force, Kansas State, Navy, and Pittsburgh. However, on National Signing Day, after, Abney II flipped his commitment to play for the Arizona State Sun Devils after receiving a late offer.

== College career ==
Abney II hauled in his first career interception in a loss against Oregon, week 13 of the college football season. Upon finishing his 2023 freshman season, he played in eight games, totalling two tackles and an interception. The next year, Abney II concluded the 2024 season recording 52 tackles, nine pass deflections, and three interceptions as he helped the Sun Devils to their first College Football Playoff appearance. He earned second-team All-Big 12 honors for his performance by conference coaches. In his final 2025 collegiate season, Abney II recorded 44 tackles, 12 pass deflections, and two interceptions, as well as two forced fumbles and his first career sack. He earned first-team All-Big 12 honors at the end of the year, being selected by conference coaches and the media.

== Professional career ==
Pre-draft measurables
Height	Weight	Arm length	Hand span	Wingspan	40-yard dash	10-yard split	20-yard split	20-yard shuttle	Three-cone drill	Bench press
5 ft 9 7/8 in (1.77 m)	187 lb (85 kg)	30 in (0.76 m)	9 3/4 in (0.25 m)	6 ft 1 5/8 in (1.87 m)	4.48 s	1.57 s	2.62 s	4.38 s	6.91 s	15 reps
All values from NFL Combine/Pro Day

Abney II was selected by the Detroit Lions with the 157th overall pick in the fifth round of the 2026 NFL draft.
