= Jordan Crook =

American gridiron football player (born 2003)

- Crook with the Hamilton Tiger-Cats in 2026

No. 32 – Hamilton Tiger-Cats
- Position: Linebacker
- Roster status: Active
- CFL status: American

Personal information
- Born: October 31, 2003 (age 23)
- Listed height: 5 ft 11 in (1.80 m)
- Listed weight: 220 lb (100 kg)

Career information
- High school: Duncanville (Duncanville, Texas)
- College: Arkansas (2022–2023); Arizona State (2024–2025)
- NFL draft: 2026: undrafted

Career history
- Hamilton Tiger-Cats (2026–present)

Awards and highlights
- Second-team All-Big 12 (2025)
- Stats at CFL.ca

Jordan Crook (born October 31, 2003) is an American professional football linebacker for the Hamilton Tiger-Cats of the Canadian Football League (CFL). He played college football for the Arkansas Razorbacks and Arizona State Sun Devils.

== Early life ==
Crook was born on October 31, 2003. He attended Duncanville High School in Duncanville, Texas where he had 98 tackles with 10.5 for loss, 4.5 sacks, two passes breakups, three forced fumbles and three interceptions with two touchdown returns.

== College career ==
Crook played college football for the Arkansas Razorbacks from 2022 to 2023 and Arizona State Sun Devils from 2024 to 2025. In 25 games at Arkansas, he had 40 tackles, including 1.5 for loss, one sack and a forced fumble. On November 28, 2023, Crook entered the transfer portal. He committed to Arizona State University on December 10. In 24 games, Crook had 158 tackles, with 11.5 for loss, two sacks, two interceptions and two pass break ups. As a senior, he earned second-team All-Big 12 honors.

== Professional career ==
Pre-draft measurables
Height	Weight	Arm length	Hand span	Wingspan	40-yard dash	10-yard split	20-yard split	20-yard shuttle	Three-cone drill	Vertical jump	Broad jump	Bench press
5 ft 11 in (1.80 m)	216 lb (98 kg)	9 3/8 in (0.24 m)	30 1/2 in (0.77 m)	6 ft 2 5/8 in (1.90 m)	4.77 s	1.65 s	2.78 s	4.44 s	7.29 s	34 in (0.86 m)	9 ft 6 in (2.90 m)	16 reps
All values from Pro day

On May 13, 2026, Crook signed with the Hamilton Tiger-Cats of the Canadian Football League (CFL). He made his CFL debut in the season opener against the Montreal Alouettes, recording five tackles and a pass break up. On July 4, Crook was moved to the practice roster. On July 17, he was promoted back to the active roster.
