= Kamari Wilson =

American football guard (born 2003)

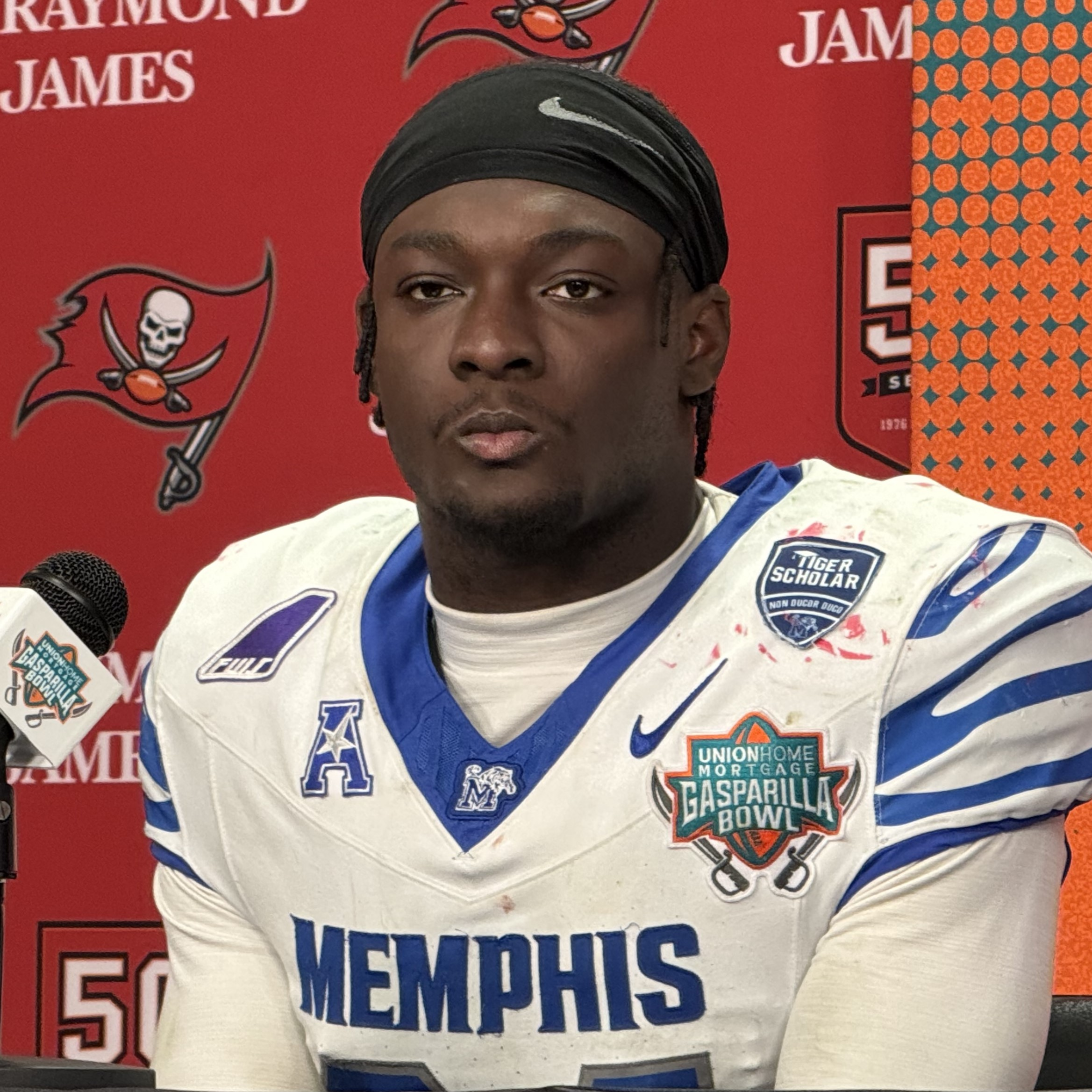
- Wilson after the 2025 Gasparilla Bowl

No. 8 – West Virginia Mountaineers
- Position: Safety
- Class: Redshirt Senior

Personal information
- Born: April 10, 2003 (age 23); Fort Pierce, Florida
- Listed height: 6 ft 0 in (1.83 m)
- Listed weight: 212 lb (96 kg)

Career information
- High school: IMG Academy (FL)
- College: Florida (2022–2023); Arizona State (2024); Memphis (2025); West Virginia (2026–present)
- Stats at ESPN

Kamari Wilson (born April 10, 2003) is an American college football safety who plays for the West Virginia Mountaineers. He previously played for the Florida Gators, Arizona State Sun Devils and Memphis Tigers.

== Early life ==
Wilson began his football career at Fort Pierce Westwood High School and then played at the IMG Academy in 2020 and 2021. He was rated No. 18 nationally and No. 1 at the safety position in ESPN's rankings of the top college football recruits in the Class of 2022. Heavily recruited by college football programs, he narrowed his final choices to Florida, Florida State, Georgia, LSU and Texas A&M. In December 2021, he committed to play for the Florida Gators.

== College career ==
=== Florida ===
Wilson was Florida's highest-rated recruit and enrolled early in January 2022.

On December 4, 2023, Wilson announced that he would be entering the NCAA transfer portal.

=== Arizona State ===
On December 16, 2023, Wilson announced that he would be transferring to Arizona State.

On December 9, 2024, Wilson announced that he would enter the transfer portal for the second time.

=== Memphis ===
On January 5, 2025, Wilson announced that he would transfer to Memphis.
