= 2023 Arizona State Sun Devils football team =

American college football season

2023 Arizona State Sun Devils football
- Conference: Pac-12 Conference
- Record: 3–9 (2–7 Pac-12)
- Head coach: Kenny Dillingham (1st season)
- Offensive coordinator: Beau Baldwin (1st season)
- Offensive scheme: Pro-style
- Defensive coordinator: Brian Ward (1st season)
- Base defense: 4–3 or 4–2–5
- Home stadium: Mountain America Stadium

Uniform
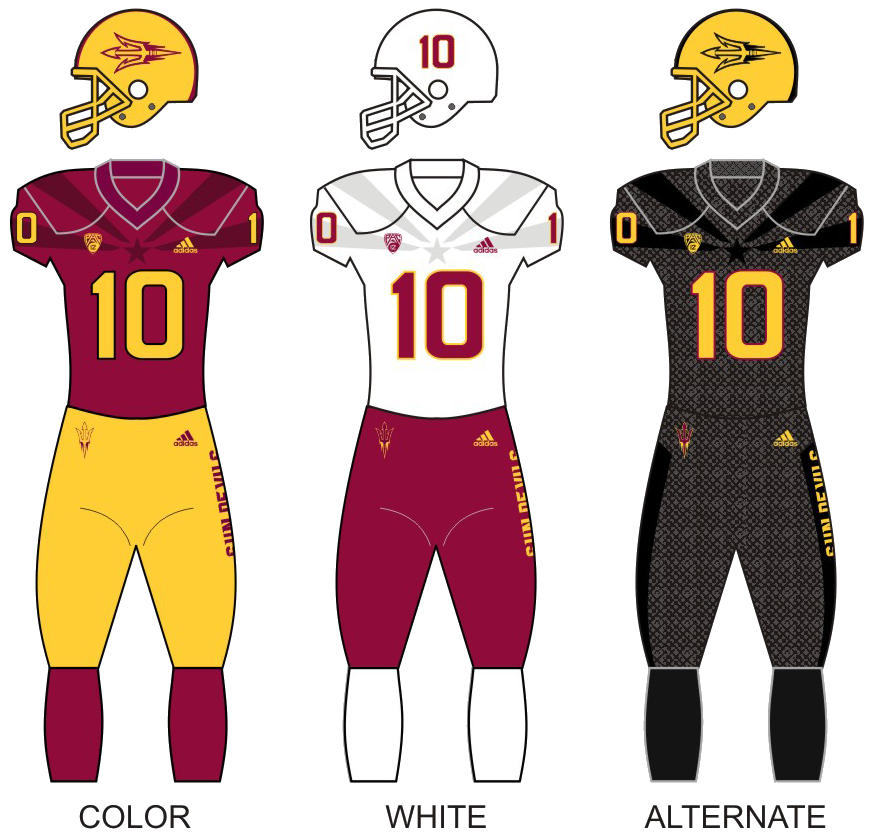

2023 Pac-12 Conference football standings
	Conf.			Overall
Team	W		L	W		L
No. 2 Washington y$^	9	–	0	14	–	1
No. 6 Oregon y	8	–	1	12	–	2
No. 11 Arizona	7	–	2	10	–	3
Oregon State	5	–	4	8	–	5
Utah	5	–	4	8	–	5
USC	5	–	4	8	–	5
California	4	–	5	6	–	7
UCLA	4	–	5	8	–	5
Washington State	2	–	7	5	–	7
Stanford	2	–	7	3	–	9
Arizona State*	2	–	7	3	–	9
Colorado	1	–	8	4	–	8
Championship: Washington 34, Oregon 31
^ – College Football Playoff participant; $ – Conference champion; y – Championship game participant; * – Ineligible for postseason play due to self-imposed ban for 2020 recruiting violations; Rankings from AP Poll

The 2023 Arizona State Sun Devils football team represented Arizona State University as a member of the Pac-12 Conference during the 2023 NCAA Division I FBS football season. The Sun Devils were led by Kenny Dillingham in his first year as head coach. Dillingham was hired as Arizona State's head coach in late November 2022.

Arizona State announced on August 2 a multi-year naming rights partnership. The Sun Devils played their home games at Mountain America Stadium in Tempe, Arizona.

This was Arizona State's final season in the Pac-12 Conference before they moved to the Big 12 Conference in 2024. On August 27, Arizona State withdrew from bowl consideration due to recruiting violations from the 2020 season.

The Arizona State Sun Devils football team drew an average home attendance of 48,301 in 2023.

== Offseason ==
Positions key
Offense	Defense	Special teams
QB — Quarterback; RB — Running back; FB — Fullback; WR — Wide receiver; TE — Tight end; OL — Offensive lineman; T — Tackle; G — Guard; C — Center	DL — Defensive lineman; DT — Defensive tackle (Note: Includes nose tackle (NT)); DE — Defensive end; EDGE — Edge rusher; LB — Linebacker (Note: Includes middle linebacker (MLB/MIKE), weakside linebacker (WILL), strongside linebacker (SAM), off-ball linebacker, and outside linebacker (OLB)); DB — Defensive back; CB — Cornerback; S — Safety (Note: Includes free safety (FS) and strong safety (SS))	K — Kicker (Note: Also known as a placekicker (PK)); P — Punter; LS — Long snapper; RS — Return specialist (Note: Includes kickoff and punt returners)

=== Players drafted into the NFL ===
Round	Pick	NFL team	Player	Position
7	231	Las Vegas Raiders	Nesta Jade Silvera	DT

=== Undrafted free agents ===
NFL team	Player	Position
Buffalo Bills	Bryan Thompson	WR
Houston Texans	Xazavian Valladay	RB
Carolina Panthers	Travez Moore	DE
Arizona Cardinals	Kyle Soelle	LB
Los Angeles Rams	Timarcus Davis	DB

=== Transfers ===
==== Outgoing transfers ====
Arizona State Outgoing transfers
Name	No.	Pos.	Height/Weight	Year	Hometown	College transferred to
LaDarius Henderson	#77	OL	6'5, 310	Senior	Waxahachie, TX	Michigan
Daniyel Ngata	#4	RB	5'10, 200	(redshirt) Sophomore	Reno, NV	Washington
Bennett Meredith	#7	QB	6'3, 195	Freshman	Hoover, AL	Purdue
Emory Jones	#5	QB	6'3, 210	(redshirt) Junior	LaGrange, GA	Cincinnati
Paul Tyson	#9	QB	6'5, 230	(redshirt) Junior	Birmingham, AL	Clemson
Cam Johnson	#7	WR	6'0, 205	(redshirt) Junior	Nashville, TN	Northwestern
Jacob Newell	#88	TE	6'4, 240	Freshman	Springfield, OR	Akron
Ben Scott	#66	OL	6'5, 310	(redshirt) Junior	Honolulu, HI	Nebraska
Danny Valenzuela	#55	OL	6'3, 285	Sophomore	Simi Valley, CA	Texas State
Ralph Frias	#79	OL	6'6, 340	(redshirt) Senior	Safford, AZ	Utah State
Armon Bethea	#57	OL	6'5, 285	(redshirt) Freshman	Brooklyn, NY	Bowling Green
Omarr Norman-Lott	#55	DL	6'3, 290	(redshirt) Sophomore	North Highlands, CA	Tennessee
Dylan Hall	#94	DL	6'5, 255	(redshirt) Junior	Lancaster, CA	North Carolina Central
Anthonie Cooper†	#96	DL	6'2, 275	(redshirt) Junior	Glendale, AZ	–
Connor Soelle	#18	LB	6'1, 220	(redshirt) Junior	Scottsdale, AZ	Oregon
B.J. Green	#18	DL	6'1, 275	Sophomore	Atlanta, GA	–
D.J. Taylor	#3	DB	5'10, 195	(redshirt) Sophomore	Tampa, FL	Cincinnati
Kejuan Markham	#12	DB	6'0, 200	Senior	Long Beach, CA	–
Keon Markham	#13	DB	6'0, 200	(redshirt) Junior	Long Beach, CA	–
Edward Czaplicki	#17	P	6'1, 200	Sophomore	Charlotte, NC	USC
Carter Brown	#3	PK	6'0, 195	Freshman	Pearland, TX	Cincinnati
Gage King	#49	LS	6'2, 245	(redshirt) Sophomore	El Dorado Hills, CA	UCF
John Ferlmann	#43	LS	6'2, 225	(redshirt) Freshman	Phoenix, AZ	Ohio State
Jace Feely	#45	LS	6'2, 225	(redshirt) Freshman	Gilbert, AZ	Colorado
Stanley Lambert	#14	DL	6'3, 220	Senior	San Antonio, TX	–
Robby Harrison	#93	DL	6'4, 325	(redshirt) Freshman	Greenwood, SC	Indiana
Jalil Rivera-Harvey	#98	DL	6'4, 295	Junior	Cedar Hill, TX	Marshall
Thomas Le Boucher	#76	OT	6'5, 305	(redshirt) Senior	Saint-Augustin-de-Desmaures, Quebec, Canada	Lamar

† Note: Players with a dash in the new school column didn't land on a new team for the 2023 season.

==== Incoming transfers ====
Arizona State Incoming transfers
Name	Pos.	Height/Weight	Year	Hometown	College transferred from
Drew Pyne	QB	6'0, 194	(redshirt) Sophomore	New Canaan, CT	Notre Dame
Jacob Conover	QB	6'1, 205	(redshirt) Sophomore	Chandler, AZ	BYU
Cameron Skattebo	RB	5'10, 200	Junior	Rio Linda, CA	Sacramento State (FCS)
DeCarlos Brooks	RB	5'9, 188	(redshirt) Junior	Chandler, AZ	California
Jordyn Tyson	WR	6'0, 170	Sophomore	Allen, TX	Colorado
Xavier Guillory	WR	6'0, 170	(redshirt) Junior	Spokane, WA	Idaho State (FCS)
Melquan Stovall	WR	5'9, 185	Graduate	Gardena, CA	Colorado State
Troy Omeire	WR	6'3, 213	(redshirt) Junior	Sugar Land, TX	Texas
Jake Smith	WR	6'0, 200	(redshirt) Junior	Scottsdale, AZ	USC
Aaron Frost	OL	6'5, 306	Graduate	Long Beach, CA	Nevada
Bram Walden	OL	6'5, 302	(redshirt) Sophomore	Scottsdale, AZ	Oregon
Ben Coleman	OL	6'4, 323	Graduate	Temecula, CA	California
Leif Fautanu	OL	6'2, 305	(redshirt) Junior	Temecula, CA	UNLV
Clayton Smith	DL	6'4, 245	(redshirt) Sophomore	Texarkana, TX	Oklahoma
Dashaun Mallory	DL	6'3, 310	Graduate	Bolingbrook, IL	Michigan State
Prince Dorbah	DL	6'2, 229	(redshirt) Junior	Dallas, TX	Texas
Tristan Monday	DL	6'4, 276	(redshirt) Freshman	Scottsdale, AZ	Wisconsin
Samuel Benjamin	DL	6'5, 255	(redshirt) Freshman	Phoenix, AZ	Idaho State (FCS)
Krew Jackson	LB	6'5, 204	(redshirt) Sophomore	Queen Creek, AZ	Kansas State
Tate Romney	LB	6'3, 220	(redshirt) Freshman	Chandler, AZ	BYU
Travion Brown	LB	6'3, 230	Graduate	Temecula, CA	Washington State
Xavion Alford	DB	6'0, 190	(redshirt) Junior	Pearland, TX	USC
Roman Rashada	DB	6'2, 195	(redshirt) Junior	Sacramento, CA	Ole Miss
Shamari Simmons	DB	6'0, 180	(redshirt) Senior	Lineville, AL	Austin Peay (FCS)
Josh Carlson	P	6'0, 185	Graduate	Gilbert, AZ	New Mexico State
Dario Longhetto	PK	6'0, 185	Graduate	Newbury Park, CA	California
Slater Zellers	LS	6'1, 235	Graduate	Scottsdale, AZ	California
Ian Shewell	DL	6'3, 248	(redshirt) Junior	Gilbert, AZ	New Mexico
Sione Finau	OL	6'3, 300	Graduate	Keller, TX	Purdue
Cade Briggs	OL	6'3, 305	Senior	Las Vegas, NV	Texas Tech

=== Recruiting class ===
Arizona State signed 20 players in the class of 2023. The Sun Devils' recruiting class was ranked forty-sixth by ESPN, forty-ninth by On3.com, fifty-second by Rivals.com, and forty-fourth by 247Sports.com. One signee was ranked in the ESPN 300 top prospect list, with another being ranked within the ESPN 50 JUCO top prospect list.

College recruiting information
Name	Hometown	School	Height	Weight	Commit date
Jaden Rashada; QB	Pittsburg, CA	Pittsburg High School	6 ft 4 in (1.93 m)	185 lb (84 kg)	Feb 1, 2023
Jaden Rashada; QB	Recruit ratings: Rivals: 247Sports: On3: ESPN: (87)				
Kyran Bourda; DT	New Orleans, LA	St. Augustine High School	6 ft 4 in (1.93 m)	295 lb (134 kg)	Jan 29, 2023
Kyran Bourda; DT	Recruit ratings: Rivals: 247Sports: On3: ESPN: (79)				
Korbin Hendrix; WR	McKinney, TX	McKinney North High School	6 ft 2 in (1.88 m)	180 lb (82 kg)	Nov 13, 2022
Korbin Hendrix; WR	Recruit ratings: Rivals: 247Sports: On3: ESPN: (79)				
Ashley Williams; DE	Zachary, LA	Zachary High School	6 ft 4 in (1.93 m)	220 lb (100 kg)	Dec 21, 2022
Ashley Williams; DE	Recruit ratings: Rivals: 247Sports: On3: ESPN: (78)				
Shawn Russ; CB	Fort Myers, FL	Dunbar High School	6 ft 2 in (1.88 m)	185 lb (84 kg)	Dec 21, 2022
Shawn Russ; CB	Recruit ratings: Rivals: 247Sports: On3: ESPN: (78)				
Kyson Brown; RB	Lancaster, TX	Lancaster High School	5 ft 10 in (1.78 m)	195 lb (88 kg)	Oct 31, 2022
Kyson Brown; RB	Recruit ratings: Rivals: 247Sports: On3: ESPN: (78)				
Maxwell Iheanachor; OT	Los Angeles, CA	East Los Angeles College (CA-JC)	6 ft 6 in (1.98 m)	305 lb (138 kg)	Dec 20, 2022
Maxwell Iheanachor; OT	Recruit ratings: Rivals: 247Sports: On3: ESPN: (77)				
Keontez Bradley; S	Mansfield, OH	Mansfield Senior High School	6 ft 1 in (1.85 m)	180 lb (82 kg)	Dec 18, 2022
Keontez Bradley; S	Recruit ratings: Rivals: 247Sports: On3: ESPN: (77)				
Sean Na'a; OG	Bellflower, CA	St. John Bosco High School	6 ft 4 in (1.93 m)	280 lb (130 kg)	Jan 23, 2023
Sean Na'a; OG	Recruit ratings: Rivals: 247Sports: On3: ESPN: (76)				
Kaleb Black; WR	Spring, TX	Klein Oak High School	5 ft 10 in (1.78 m)	175 lb (79 kg)	Dec 21, 2022
Kaleb Black; WR	Recruit ratings: Rivals: 247Sports: On3: ESPN: (76)				
Josiah Cox; S	San Diego, CA	Abraham Lincoln High School	6 ft 1 in (1.85 m)	185 lb (84 kg)	Dec 21, 2022
Josiah Cox; S	Recruit ratings: Rivals: 247Sports: On3: ESPN: (76)				
K'vion Thunderbird; LB	Chicago, IL	Kenwood Academy High School	6 ft 1 in (1.85 m)	210 lb (95 kg)	Jan 26, 2023
K'vion Thunderbird; LB	Recruit ratings: Rivals: 247Sports: On3: ESPN: (76)				
C.J. Fite; DT	Tatum, TX	Tatum High School	6 ft 2 in (1.88 m)	275 lb (125 kg)	Dec 12, 2022
C.J. Fite; DT	Recruit ratings: Rivals: 247Sports: On3: ESPN: (76)				
Lenox Lawson; RB	Mesa, AZ	Red Mountain High School	5 ft 11 in (1.80 m)	180 lb (82 kg)	Dec 12, 2022
Lenox Lawson; RB	Recruit ratings: Rivals: 247Sports: On3: ESPN: (75)				
Montana Warren; S	Marshall, TX	Marshall High School	6 ft 1 in (1.85 m)	180 lb (82 kg)	Dec 18, 2022
Montana Warren; S	Recruit ratings: Rivals: 247Sports: On3: ESPN: (75)				
Sirri Kandiyeli; OC	Tucson, AZ	Mountain View High School	6 ft 3 in (1.91 m)	270 lb (120 kg)	Dec 2, 2022
Sirri Kandiyeli; OC	Recruit ratings: Rivals: 247Sports: On3: ESPN: (75)				
Keith Abney; ATH	Waxahachie, TX	Waxahachie High School	5 ft 11 in (1.80 m)	175 lb (79 kg)	Dec 21, 2022
Keith Abney; ATH	Recruit ratings: Rivals: 247Sports: On3: ESPN: (75)				
Elijah O'Neal; DE	Oroville, CA	Butte College (CA-JC)	6 ft 4 in (1.93 m)	245 lb (111 kg)	Dec 18, 2022
Elijah O'Neal; DE	Recruit ratings: Rivals: 247Sports: On3: ESPN: (74)				
Kyle Scott; OT	Lake Elsinore, CA	Riverside Community College (CA-JC)	6 ft 5 in (1.96 m)	320 lb (150 kg)	Dec 18, 2022
Kyle Scott; OT	Recruit ratings: Rivals: 247Sports: On3: ESPN: (72)				
Landen Thomas; DT	Zachary, LA	Zachary High School	6 ft 4 in (1.93 m)	240 lb (110 kg)	Dec 19, 2022
Landen Thomas; DT	Recruit ratings: Rivals: 247Sports: On3: ESPN: (72)				
Overall recruit ranking:
‡ Refers to 40-yard dash; Note: In many cases, Scout, Rivals, 247Sports, On3, and ESPN may conflict in their listings of height, weight and 40 time.; In these cases, the average was taken. ESPN grades are on a 100-point scale.; Sources: "Arizona State Football Commitment List". Rivals.; "2023 Player Commitments – Arizona State". ESPN.; "2023 Team Ranking". Rivals.com.; "2023 Arizona State Sun Devils football team". 247Sports.

2023 overall class rankings

Website	National rank	Conference rank	5 star recruits	4 star recruits	3 star recruits	2 star recruits	1 star recruits	No star ranking
ESPN	#46	#9	—	1	19	0	0	0
On3 Recruits	#49	#9	—	1	19	0	0	0
Rivals	#52	#8	–	1	17	2	0	0
247 Sports	#44	#7	—	1	19	0	0	0

== Preseason ==
=== Pac–12 media polls ===
Predicted finish	Team	Votes (1st place)
1	USC	413 (25)
2	Washington	367 (4)
3	Utah	359 (6)
4	Oregon	344 (1)
5	Oregon State	309
6	UCLA	248
7	Washington State	186
8	Arizona	176
9	California	132
10	Arizona State	122
11	Colorado	98
12	Stanford	54

== Schedule ==
Date	Time	Opponent	Site	TV	Result	Attendance
August 31	7:00 p.m.	Southern Utah*	Mountain America Stadium; Tempe, AZ	P12N	W 24–21	47,773
September 9	7:30 p.m.	Oklahoma State*	Mountain America Stadium; Tempe, AZ	FS1	L 15–27	42,569
September 16	7:30 p.m.	Fresno State*	Mountain America Stadium; Tempe, AZ	FS1	L 0–29	46,723
September 23	7:30 p.m.	No. 5 USC	Mountain America Stadium; Tempe, AZ	FOX	L 28–42	54,166
September 30	12:00 p.m.	at California	California Memorial Stadium; Berkeley, CA	P12N	L 21–24	34,353
October 7	3:30 p.m.	Colorado	Mountain America Stadium; Tempe, AZ	P12N	L 24–27	54,086
October 21	7:30 p.m.	at No. 5 Washington	Husky Stadium; Seattle, WA	FS1	L 7–15	68,379
October 28	5:00 p.m.	Washington State^{†}	Mountain America Stadium; Tempe, AZ	P12N	W 38–27	47,284
November 4	11:00 a.m.	at No. 18 Utah	Rice-Eccles Stadium; Salt Lake City, UT	P12N	L 3–55	52,104
November 11	7:00 p.m.	at UCLA	Rose Bowl; Pasadena, CA	P12N	W 17–7	56,436
November 18	2:00 p.m.	No. 6 Oregon	Mountain America Stadium; Tempe, AZ	FOX	L 13–49	44,741
November 25	1:30 p.m.	No. 15 Arizona	Mountain America Stadium; Tempe, AZ (rivalry)	ESPN	L 23–59	53,414
*Non-conference game; ^{†}Homecoming; Rankings from Coaches' Poll released prior to the game; All times are in Mountain time

== Personnel ==
=== Roster ===
2023 Arizona State Sun Devils roster
Quarterbacks: 5 – Jaden Rashada – Freshman (6'4, 185); 7 – Hunter Herrera – Freshman (6'3, 190); 10 – Drew Pyne – (redshirt) Sophomore (6'0, 194); 15 – Jacob Conover – (redshirt) Sophomore (6'0, 213); 16 – Trenton Bourguet – (redshirt) Senior (5'11, 185); Running backs: 4 – Cameron Skattebo – Junior (5'10, 222); 8 – Javen Jacobs – Sophomore (5'10, 190); 14 – Kyson Brown – Freshman (5'10, 192); 21 – George Hart III – Junior (5'11, 215); 25 – DeCarlos Brooks – (redshirt) Junior (5'10, 210); 28 – Tevin White – Sophomore (6'1, 210); 44 – Sinjin Schmitt – Freshman (6'3, 220); Wide receivers: 0 – Jordyn Tyson – Sophomore (6'2, 185); 1 – Xavier Guillory – (redshirt) Junior (6'2, 195); 2 – Elijhah Badger – (redshirt) Junior (6'2, 190); 3 – Jake Smith – (redshirt) Junior (6'0, 200); 6 – Giovanni Sanders – Graduate (6'0, 185); 7 – Melquan Stovall – Graduate (5'9, 185); 9 – Troy Omeire – (redshirt) Junior (6'3, 213); 17 – Kaleb Black – Freshman (5'9, 165); 18 – Patrick Williams II – (redshirt) Freshman (6'5, 200); 19 – Alonzo Brown – Freshman (6'3, 185); 20 – Shawn Charles – (redshirt) Senior (5'11, 190); 81 – Jamaal Young II – Freshman (5'11, 185); 82 – Andre Johnson – (redshirt) Senior (6'3, 210); 83 – Derek Eusebio – Freshman (5'9, 195); 84 – Korbin Hendrix – Freshman (6'3, 180); 87 – Max Ware – (redshirt) Sophomore (6'1, 185); 88 – Coben Bourguet – (redshirt) Sophomore (6'0, 200); 89 – Josh Hart – (redshirt) Junior (6'0, 205); Tight ends: 12 – Jalin Conyers – (redshirt) Junior (6'4, 265); 13 – Bryce Pierre – (redshirt) Senior (6'5, 255); 24 – Coleson Arends – Freshman (6'4, 235); 66 – Connor Lopez – Freshman (6'5, 217); 80 – Messiah Swinson – (redshirt) Senior (6'8, 255); 85 – Ryan Morgan – (redshirt) Junior (6'3, 260); Placekicker/Punter: 16 – Josh Carlson – Graduate (6'0, 185) (P); 30 – Ian Hershey – Sophomore (5'11, 170) (K/P); 37 – Dario Longhetto – Graduate (6'0, 185) (K); 47 – Race Mahlum – (redshirt) Junior (6'2, 195) (P); 50 – Carston Kieffer – Freshman (5'9, 174) (K); Long snappers: 45 – Slater Zellers – Graduate (6'1, 235); 51 – Cole Marszalek – Freshman (5'11, 215)	Offensive Lineman: 52 – Sirri Kandiyeli – Freshman (6'3, 265); 55 – Cade Briggs – (redshirt) Junior (6'3, 310); 57 – Isaiah Hullum – (redshirt) Freshman (6'3, 310); 58 – Max Iheanachor – Junior (6'5, 319); 60 – Isaac Haro – Freshman (6'5, 280); 61 – Matt Katergaris – (redshirt) Freshman (6'2, 275); 62 – Ben Coleman – Graduate (6'4, 323); 64 – Ben Bray – (redshirt) Junior (6'4, 295); 65 – Aaron Frost – Graduate (6'5, 306); 67 – Keona Peat – Freshman (6'4, 260); 69 – Joey Ramos – (redshirt) Senior (6'5, 305); 70 – Emmit Bohle – Graduate (6'6, 290); 71 – Makua Pule – Freshman (6'3, 290); 72 – Sione Finau – (redshirt) Senior (6'3, 310); 73 – Isaia Glass – Junior (6'5, 295); 74 – Sean Na'a – Freshman (6'4, 275); 75 – Bram Walden – (redshirt) Sophomore (6'5, 302); 76 – Griffin Schureman – Freshman (6'1, 255); 77 – Kyle Scott – Junior (6'5, 300); 78 – Colby Garvin – (redshirt) Sophomore (6'6, 250); 79 – Leif Fautanu – (redshirt) Junior (6'2, 305); Defensive Lineman: 0 – Dashaun Mallory – Graduate (6'1, 275); 3 – Clayton Smith – (redshirt) Sophomore (6'4, 245); 15 – Elijah O'Neal – Junior (6'4, 245); 17 – Ashley Williams – Freshman (6'5, 225); 32 – Prince Dorbah – (redshirt) Junior (6'2, 229); 35 – B.J. Green – Junior (6'1, 275); 49 – Gharin Stansbury – (redshirt) Sophomore (6'6, 245); 52 – Ian Shewell – (redshirt) Sophomore (6'6, 275); 65 – Magnum West – Freshman (6'2, 260); 88 – Harold Brooks III – (redshirt) Freshman (6'2, 295); 90 – John Butler III – Freshman (6'1, 235); 91 – Michael Matus – Graduate (6'2, 260); 92 – Sam Benjamin – (redshirt) Freshman (6'5, 255); 93 – Tristan Monday – (redshirt) Freshman (6'4, 276); 94 – Landen Thomas – Freshman (6'3, 260); 95 – Kyran Bourda – Freshman (6'3, 295); 96 – Anthonie Cooper – (redshirt) Senior (6'2, 275); 97 – Blazen Lono-Wong – (redshirt) Freshman (6'4, 270); 99 – C.J. Fite – Freshman (6'1, 297)	Linebackers: 8 – Will Shaffer – (redshirt) Junior (6'0, 235); 22 – Caleb McCullough – (redshirt) Junior (6'2, 215); 24 – Tate Romney – (redshirt) Freshman (6'3, 220); 34 – Myles Amey – (redshirt) Freshman (6'1, 215); 41 – Zach Bowers – (redshirt) Senior (5'11, 230); 43 – Krew Jackson – (redshirt) Sophomore (6'5, 204); 45 – K'Vion Thunderbird – Freshman (6'1, 215); 51 – Anthony Ruiz – Freshman (6'0, 220); 56 – Isaac Stopke – Freshman (5'11, 230); 66 – James Djonkam – Junior (6'3, 245); 82 – Travion Brown – Graduate (6'3, 230); Defensive backs: 1 – Jordan Clark – (redshirt) Senior (5'10, 185); 2 – Xavion Alford – (redshirt) Junior (6'0, 190); 4 – Demetries Ford – (redshirt) Senior (5'8, 180); 5 – Chris Edmonds – Senior (6'2, 215); 6 – Macen Williams – (redshirt) Junior (5'11, 190); 7 – Shamari Simmons – (redshirt) Senior (6'0, 180); 9 – Ro Torrence – (redshirt) Junior (6'3, 210); 10 – Ed Woods – (redshirt) Junior (6'0, 180); 12 – Lenox Lawson – Freshman (5'10, 172); 13 – Josiah Cox – Freshman (6'0, 180); 14 – Alphonso Taylor – Senior (6'0, 200); 18 – Montana Warren – Freshman (6'3, 180); 19 – Keith Abney II – Freshman (6'0, 183); 20 – Adama Fall – (redshirt) Sophomore (6'2, 200); 21 – RJ Regan – Junior (5'11, 180); 23 – Keontez Bradley – Freshman (6'1, 172); 25 – Roman Rashada – (redshirt) Junior (6'2, 195); 26 – Jack Bal – Freshman (6'3, 185); 28 – Joseph McGinnis II – (redshirt) Freshman (6'1, 173); 29 – Shawn Russ – Freshman (6'3, 185); 31 – Jean Boyd III – (redshirt) Junior (6'0, 190); 38 – Damon Williamson – (redshirt) Junior (6'1, 195); 44 – Tommy Romano – Freshman (5'11, 185); 47 – Shahid Wilson – Freshman (6'1, 185); Legend: (C) Team captain; (S) Suspended; (I) Ineligible; Injured; Redshirt
Updated to week 1 (09/10/2023):

=== Coaching staff ===
Name	Position	Alma mater	Year at Arizona State
Kenny Dillingham	Head coach	Arizona State University	1st
Matt Butterfield	Chief of Staff; Senior Coaching Advisor; Pro Liaison	University of Colorado	1st
Charlie Ragle	Assistant Head Coach; Special Teams Coordinator	Eastern New Mexico	1st
Beau Baldwin	Offensive Coordinator; Quarterbacks Coach	Central Washington University	1st
Brian Ward	Defensive Coordinator	McPherson College	1st
Ra'Shaad Samples	Wide Receivers Coach; Passing Game Coordinator	University of Houston	1st
Shaun Aguano	Running Backs Coach	Linfield College	4th
Saga Tuitele	Offensive Line Coach	Portland State University	1st
A. J. Cooper	Linebackers Coach; Run Game Coordinator	North Dakota State University	1st
Bryan Carrington	Cornerbacks Coach	University of Houston	1st
Vince Amey	Defensive Line Coach	Arizona State University	1st
Jason Mohns	Tight Ends Coach	Arizona State University	1st

=== Support staff ===
- Marvin Lewis – Special Advisor
- Bryan McGinnis – Director of Football Operations
- D. J. Foster – Manager of Player Development
- Isaiah Williams – Director of Recruiting Strategy
- Joe Connolly – Head Coach - Football Sports Performance
- Clayton Kirven – Assistant Head Coach - Football Sports Performance
- Colbert Calhoun – Assistant Director - Football Sports Performance
- Allie Ueckert – On-Campus Recruiting Manage

=== Analysts ===
- Bobby Wade – Analyst - Offense
- Joey Muscarella – Analyst - Offense
- Trent Greene – Analyst - Defense
- Max Silver – Analyst - Defense
- Pierre Cormier – Analyst - Special Teams

=== Graduate assistants ===
- Steve Miller – Graduate Assistant - Offense
- Ryan Jenkins Graduate Assistant - Offense
- Ray Clark – Graduate Assistant - Defense
- Jordan Lee – Graduate Assistant - Defense

== Game summaries ==
=== vs Southern Utah (FCS) ===
Southern Utah Thunderbirds (0–0) vs Arizona State Sun Devils (0–0) – Game summary

Quarter	1	2	3	4	Total
Thunderbirds	0	7	7	7	21
Sun Devils	7	14	0	3	24

at Mountain America Stadium • Tempe, AZ

- Date: August 31, 2023
- Game time: 7:00 p.m.
- Game weather: Cloudy, 102 °F (39 °C)
- Game attendance: 47,773
- Referee: Cravonne Barrett
- TV announcers (Pac-12 Network): Roxy Bernstein (play-by-play), Lincoln Kennedy (analyst)

Game information

First quarter

- (9:00) ASU – Cameron Skattebo 6-yard run, Dario Longhetto kick (Drive: 5 plays, 68 yards, 1:59; Arizona State 7–0)

Second quarter

- (11:05) SUU – Targhee Lambson 1-yard run, Tyler Graham kick (Drive: 11 plays, 62 yards, 6:43; Tied 7–7)
- (5:32) ASU – Xavier Guillory 47-yard pass from Jaden Rashada, Dario Longhetto kick (Drive: 7 plays, 77 yards, 2:37; Arizona State 14–7)
- (0:02) ASU – Troy Omeire 3-yard pass from Jaden Rashada, Dario Longhetto kick (Drive: 8 plays, 75 yards, 2:54; Arizona State 21–7)

Third quarter

- (0:49) SUU – Zack Mitchell 17-yard pass from Justin Miller, Tyler Graham kick (Drive: 5 plays, 70 yards, 3:39; Arizona State 21–14)

Fourth quarter

- (13:41) ASU – Dario Longhetto 38-yard field goal (Drive: 4 plays, -14 yards, 1:49; Arizona State 24–14)
- (7:50) SUU – George Ramirez 47-yard blocked punt return, Tyler Graham kick (Drive: 9 plays, 27 yards, 4:40; Arizona State 24–21)

Statistics	SUU	ASU
First downs	11	19
Total yards	226	371
Rushes/yards	87	135
Passing yards	139	236
Passing: Comp–Att–Int	9–18–0	18–31–0
Time of possession	30:48	29:12

Team	Category	Player	Statistics
Southern Utah	Passing	Justin Miller	8/17, 123 yards, TD
Southern Utah	Rushing	Braedon Wissler	15 carries, 45 yards
Southern Utah	Receiving	Zach Mitchell	4 receptions, 52 yards, TD
Arizona State	Passing	Jaden Rashada	18/31, 236 yards, 2 TD
Arizona State	Rushing	Cameron Skattebo	17 carries, 75 yards, TD
Arizona State	Receiving	Xavier Guillory	5 receptions, 73 yards, TD

=== vs Oklahoma State ===
Oklahoma State Cowboys (1–0) vs Arizona State Sun Devils (1–0) – Game summary

Quarter	1	2	3	4	Total
Cowboys	0	10	7	10	27
Sun Devils	7	8	0	0	15

at Mountain America Stadium • Tempe, AZ

- Date: September 9, 2023
- Game time: 7:00 p.m.
- Game weather: Sunny, 105 °F (41 °C)
- Game attendance: 42,569
- Referee: Kevin Mar
- TV announcers (FS1): Alex Faust (play-by-play), Petros Papadakis (analyst)

Game information

First quarter

- (4:28) ASU – Cameron Skattebo 13-yard run, Dario Longhetto kick (Drive: 11 plays, 77 yards, 5:18; Arizona State 7–0)

Second quarter

- (11:58) OKST – Ollie Gordon II 2-yard run, Alex Hale kick (Drive: 7 plays, 43 yards, 3:02; Tied 7–7)
- (10:07) ASU – Elijhah Badger 65-yard pass from Jaden Rashada, Cameron Skattebo two-point run (Drive: 4 plays, 75 yards, 1:51; Arizona State 15–7)
- (7:41) OKST – Alex Hale 52-yard field goal (Drive: 6 plays, 40 yards, 2:26; Arizona State 15–10)

Third quarter

- (9:09) OKST – De'Zhaun Stribling 3-yard pass from Gunnar Gundy, Alex Hale kick (Drive: 5 plays, 60 yards, 3:04; Oklahoma State 17–15)

Fourth quarter

- (7:11) OKST – Alex Hale 22-yard field goal (Drive: 10 plays, 52 yards, 5:28; Oklahoma State 20–15)
- (2:56) OKST – Brennan Presley 16-yard pass from Garret Rangel, Alex Hale kick (Drive: 6 plays, 33 yards, 3:07; Oklahoma State 27–15)

Statistics	OKST	ASU
First downs	16	15
Total yards	304	277
Rushes/yards	31–113	34–110
Passing yards	191	167
Passing: Comp–Att–Int	22–32–0	16–29–1
Time of possession	31:17	28:43

Team	Category	Player	Statistics
Oklahoma State	Passing	Alan Bowman	11/16, 113 yards
Oklahoma State	Rushing	Ollie Gordon II	9 carries, 53 yards, TD
Oklahoma State	Receiving	De'Zhaun Stribling	7 receptions, 65 yards, TD
Arizona State	Passing	Jaden Rashada	16/29, 167 yards, TD, INT
Arizona State	Rushing	Cameron Skattebo	14 carries, 62 yards, TD
Arizona State	Receiving	Elijhah Badger	3 receptions, 80 yards, TD

=== vs Fresno State ===
Fresno State Bulldogs (2–0) vs Arizona State Sun Devils (1–1) – Game summary

Quarter	1	2	3	4	Total
Bulldogs	10	6	10	3	29
Sun Devils	0	0	0	0	0

at Mountain America Stadium • Tempe, AZ

- Date: September 16, 2023
- Game time: 7:30 p.m.
- Game weather: Sunny, 90 °F (32 °C)
- Game attendance: 46,723
- Referee: John Love
- TV announcers (FS1): Alex Faust (play-by-play), Petros Papadakis (analyst)

Game information

First quarter

- (11:27) FRES – Jalen Moss 19-yard pass from Mikey Keene, Dylan Lynch kick (Drive: 8 plays, 75 yards, 3:33; Fresno State 7–0)
- (5:50) FRES – Dylan Lynch 39-yard field goal (Drive: 9 plays, 31 yards, 4:31; Fresno State 10–0)

Second quarter

- (12:23) FRES – Dylan Lynch 30-yard field goal (Drive: 11 plays, 56 yards, 5:08; Fresno State 13–0)
- (10:25) FRES – Dylan Lynch 29-yard field goal (Drive: 4 plays, 2 yards, 0:58; Fresno State 16–0)

Third quarter

- (12:03) FRES – Jaelen Gill 42-yard pass from Mikey Keene, Dylan Lynch kick (Drive: 5 plays, 68 yards, 1:32; Fresno State 23–0)
- (6:22) FRES – Dylan Lynch 56-yard field goal (Drive: 8 plays, 0 yards, 3:57; Fresno State 26–0)

Fourth quarter

- (14:31) FRES – Dylan Lynch 33-yard field goal (Drive: 4 plays, 0 yards, 0:17; Fresno State 29–0)

Statistics	FRES	ASU
First downs	24	15
Total yards	350	230
Rushes/yards	69	42
Passing yards	281	188
Passing: Comp–Att–Int	32–49–0	17–37–5
Time of possession	37:06	22:54

Team	Category	Player	Statistics
Fresno State	Passing	Mikey Keene	39/48, 281 yards, 2 TD
Fresno State	Rushing	Elijah Gilliam	18 carries, 69 yards
Fresno State	Receiving	Erik Brooks	11 receptions, 104 yards
Arizona State	Passing	Jacob Conover	6/16, 89 yards, 2 INT
Arizona State	Rushing	Kyson Brown	5 carries, 23 yards
Arizona State	Receiving	Bryce Pierre	3 receptions, 35 yards

=== vs No. 5 USC ===
No. 5 USC Trojans (3–0) vs Arizona State Sun Devils (1–2) – Game summary

Quarter	1	2	3	4	Total
No. 5 Trojans	14	7	6	15	42
Sun Devils	7	6	8	7	28

at Mountain America Stadium • Tempe, AZ

- Date: September 23, 2023
- Game time: 7:30 p.m.
- Game weather: Sunny, 79 °F (26 °C)
- Game attendance: 54,166
- Referee: Justin Elliott
- TV announcers (FOX): Tim Brando (play-by-play), Spencer Tillman (analyst), Josh Sims (sideline)

Game information

First quarter

- (8:46) USC – Caleb Williams 1-yard run, Denis Lynch kick (Drive: 12 plays, 75 yards, 6:14; USC 7–0)
- (6:57) ASU – Cameron Skattebo 15-yard run, Dario Longhetto kick (Drive: 3 plays, 15 yards, 1:18; Tied 7–7)
- (1:15) USC – Brenden Rice 43-yard pass from Caleb Williams, Denis Lynch kick (Drive: 9 plays, 87 yards, 5:30; USC 14–7)

Second quarter

- (10:28) ASU – Dario Longhetto 35-yard field goal (Drive: 13 plays, 48 yards, 5:47; USC 14–10)
- (8:29) USC – Caleb Williams 1-yard run, Denis Lynch kick (Drive: 5 plays, 43 yards, 1:57; USC 21–10)
- (2:21) ASU – Dario Longhetto 30-yard field goal (Drive: 13 plays, 64 yards, 6:02; USC 21–13)

Third quarter

- (11:13) USC – Denis Lynch 53-yard field goal (Drive: 7 plays, 28 yards, 2:44; USC 24–13)
- (9:25) ASU – Elijhah Badger 25-yard pass from Drew Pyne, Cameron Skattebo two-point run (Drive: 5 plays, 75 yards, 1:48; USC 24–21)
- (6:29) USC – Denis Lynch 36-yard field goal (Drive: 6 plays, 64 yards, 2:51; USC 27–21)

Fourth quarter

- (10:31) USC – Brenden Rice 29-yard pass from Caleb Williams, Caleb Williams two-point pass to Mario Williams (Drive: 2 plays, 44 yards, 0:54; USC 35–21)
- (8:05) ASU – Cameron Skattebo 52-yard pass from Drew Pyne, Dario Longhetto kick (Drive: 6 plays, 75 yards, 2:26; USC 35–28)
- (7:17) USC – Tahj Washington 45-yard pass from Caleb Williams, Denis Lynch kick (Drive: 3 plays, 75 yards, 0:48; USC 42–28)

Statistics	USC	ASU
First downs	22	22
Total yards	535	353
Rushes/yards	27–217	32–90
Passing yards	322	263
Passing: Comp–Att–Int	20–31–0	23–39–1
Time of possession	28:12	31:48

Team	Category	Player	Statistics
USC	Passing	Caleb Williams	20/31, 322 yards, 3 TD
USC	Rushing	MarShawn Lloyd	14 carries, 154 yards
USC	Receiving	Brenden Rice	7 receptions, 133 yards, 2 TD
Arizona State	Passing	Drew Pyne	21/36, 221 yards, 2 TD, INT
Arizona State	Rushing	Cameron Skattebo	20 carries, 111 yards, TD
Arizona State	Receiving	Elijhah Badger	9 receptions, 81 yards, TD

=== at California ===
Arizona State Sun Devils (1–3) at California Golden Bears (2–2) – Game summary

Quarter	1	2	3	4	Total
Sun Devils	7	0	6	8	21
Golden Bears	7	3	7	7	24

at California Memorial Stadium • Berkeley, CA

- Date: September 30, 2023
- Game time: 12:00 p.m.
- Game weather: Cloudy, 61 °F (16 °C)
- Game attendance: 34,353
- Referee: Matthew Richards
- TV announcers (Pac-12 Network): J. B. Long (play-by-play), Shane Vereen (analyst)

Game information

First quarter

- (6:16) CAL – Isaiah Ifanse 1-yard run, Mateen Bhaghani kick (Drive: 7 plays, 68 yards, 2:56; California 7–0)
- (0:15) ASU – Cameron Skattebo 2-yard run, Dario Longhetto kick (Drive: 13 plays, 75 yards, 5:55; Tied 7–7)

Second quarter

- (8:18) CAL – Mateen Bhaghani 37-yard field goal (Drive: 8 plays, 22 yards, 2:27; California 10–7)

Third quarter

- (9:11) CAL – Jeremiah Hunter 21-yard pass from Sam Jackson V, Mateen Bhaghani kick (Drive: 4 plays, 31 yards, 2:01; California 17–7)
- (5:29) ASU – Dario Longhetto 24-yard field goal (Drive: 7 plays, 71 yards, 3:33; California 17–10)
- (0:44) ASU – Dario Longhetto 29-yard field goal (Drive: 6 plays, 69 yards, 2:13; California 17–13)

Fourth quarter

- (10:52) CAL – Jadyn Ott 2-yard run, Mateen Bhaghani kick (Drive: 3 plays, 11 yards, 1:14; California 24–13)
- (9:18) ASU – Trenton Bourguet 3-yard run, Elijhah Badger two-point pass to Trenton Bourguet (Drive: 4 plays, 48 yards, 1:23; California 24–21)

Statistics	ASU	CAL
First downs	17	19
Total yards	430	326
Rushes/yards	29–68	48–196
Passing yards	362	130
Passing: Comp–Att–Int	27–43–1	12–28–0
Time of possession	30:18	29:42

Team	Category	Player	Statistics
Arizona State	Passing	Trenton Bourguet	26/41, 344 yards, INT
Arizona State	Rushing	Cameron Skattebo	24 carries, 59 yards, TD
Arizona State	Receiving	Cameron Skattebo	4 receptions, 98 yards
California	Passing	Sam Jackson V	12/28, 130 yards, TD
California	Rushing	Jaydn Ott	29 carries, 165 yards, TD
California	Receiving	Jeremiah Hunter	6 receptions, 89 yards, TD

=== vs Colorado ===
Colorado Buffaloes (3–2) vs Arizona State Sun Devils (1–4) – Game summary

Quarter	1	2	3	4	Total
Buffaloes	7	7	0	13	27
Sun Devils	7	10	0	7	24

at Mountain America Stadium • Tempe, AZ

- Date: October 7, 2023
- Game time: 3:30 p.m.
- Game weather: Sunny, 99 °F (37 °C)
- Game attendance: 54,086
- Referee: Chris Wiggins
- TV announcers (Pac-12 Network): Jordan Kent (play-by-play), Lincoln Kennedy (analyst)

Game information

First quarter

- (10:23) ASU – Trenton Bourguet 2-yard run, Dario Longhetto kick (Drive: 9 plays, 66 yards, 04:29; Arizona State 7–0)
- (02:03) COL – Xavier Weaver 1-yard run, Alejandro Mata kick (Drive: 16 plays, 75 yards, 05:58; Tied 7–7)

Second quarter

- (06:38) ASU – Cameron Skattebo 1-yard run, Dario Longhetto kick (Drive: 9 plays, 59 yards, 04:50; Arizona State 14–7)
- (00:54) COL – Shedeur Sanders 16-yard run, Alejandro Mata kick (Drive: 9 plays, 81 yards, 02:09; Tied 14–14)
- (00:00) ASU – Dario Longhetto 33-yard field goal (Drive: 7 plays, 48 yards, 00:50; Arizona State 17–14)

Third quarter

- None

Fourth quarter

- (14:32) COL – Javon Antonio 9-yard pass from Shedeur Sanders, Alejandro Mata kick (Drive: 7 plays, 61 yards, 01:35; Colorado 21–17)
- (10:13) COL – Alejandro Mata 42-yard field goal (Drive: 4 plays, 1 yard, 01:54; Colorado 24–17)
- (00:50) ASU – Troy Omeire pass from Trenton Bourguet (Drive: 13 plays, 94 yards, 02:36; Tied 24–24)
- (00:12) COL – Alejandro Mata 43-yard field goal (Drive: 5 plays, 50 yards, 00:38; Colorado 27–24)

Statistics	COL	ASU
First downs	19	25
Total yards	295	392
Rushes/yards	30–56	29–57
Passing yards	239	335
Passing: Comp–Att–Int	26–42–0	32–50–0
Time of possession	25:12	34:48

Team	Category	Player	Statistics
Colorado	Passing	Shedeur Sanders	26/42, 239 yards, TD
Colorado	Rushing	Anthony Hankerson	10 carries, 58 yards
Colorado	Receiving	Javon Antonio	5 receptions, 81 yards, TD
Arizona State	Passing	Trenton Bourguet	32/49, 335 yards, TD
Arizona State	Rushing	Cameron Skattebo	13 carries, 49 yards, TD
Arizona State	Receiving	Elijhah Badger	12 receptions, 134 yards

=== at No. 5 Washington ===
Arizona State Sun Devils (1–5) at No. 5 Washington Huskies (6–0) – Game summary

Quarter	1	2	3	4	Total
Sun Devils	0	7	0	0	7
No. 5 Huskies	0	3	0	12	15

at Husky Stadium • Seattle, WA

- Date: October 21, 2023
- Game time: 7:30 p.m.
- Game weather: Rain • Temperature: 54 °F (12 °C) • Wind: N 5mph
- Game attendance: 68,379
- Referee: Jeff Dahle
- TV announcers (FS1): Jeff Levering, Mark Helfrich

Game information

First quarter

No scoring plays

Second quarter

- (4:22) ASU - Cam Skattebo 1-yard run, Dario Longhetto kick (Drive: 8 plays, 53 yards, 4:28; Arizona State 7–0)
- (0:12) WASH – Grady Gross 24-yard field goal (Drive: 11 plays, 73 yards, 4:04; Arizona State 7–3)

Third quarter

No scoring plays

Fourth quarter

- (12:28) WASH – Grady Gross 47-yard field goal (Drive: 7 plays, 40 yards, 2:03; Arizona State 7–6)
- (8:11) WASH – Grady Gross 47-yard field goal (Washington 12–7)
- (3:17) WASH – Grady Gross 47-yard field goal (Drive: 8 plays, 62 yards, 3:02; Washington 15–7)

Statistics	ASU	WASH
First downs	20	17
Total yards	341	288
Rushes/yards	31–145	13–13
Passing yards	196	275
Passing: Comp–Att–Int	26–47–1	27–42–2
Time of possession	37:29	22:31

Team	Category	Player	Statistics
Arizona State	Passing	Trenton Bourguet	26/47, 196 yards, INT
Arizona State	Rushing	DeCarlos Brooks	10 carries, 63 yards
Arizona State	Receiving	Elijhah Badger	8 receptions, 50 yards
Washington	Passing	Michael Penix Jr.	27/42, 275 yards, 2 INT
Washington	Rushing	Will Nixon	1 carry, 13 yards
Washington	Receiving	Ja'Lynn Polk	9 receptions, 102 yards

=== vs Washington State ===
Washington State Cougars (4–3) vs Arizona State Sun Devils (1–6) – Game summary

Quarter	1	2	3	4	Total
Cougars	7	14	3	3	27
Sun Devils	7	17	7	7	38

at Mountain America Stadium • Tempe, AZ

- Date: October 28, 2023
- Game time: 5:00 p.m.
- Game weather: Clear • Temperature: 83 °F (28 °C) • Wind: NE 5 mph
- Game attendance: 47,284
- Referee: John Love
- TV announcers (P12N): Roxy Bernstein, Lincoln Kennedy

Game information

First quarter

- (8:33) WSU - Cameron Ward 3-yard run, Dean Janikowski kick (Drive: 15 plays, 75 yards, 6:27; Washington State 7–0)
- (4:05) ASU – DeCarlos Brooks 13-yard run, Dario Longhetto kick (Drive: 10 plays, 75 yards, 4:28; Tied 7–7)

Second quarter

- (7:14) ASU – DeCarlos Brooks 1-yard run, Dario Longhetto kick (Drive: 7 plays, 70 yards, 4:01; Arizona State 14–7)
- (4:47) WSU – Cameron Ward 11-yard run, Dean Janikowski kick (Drive: 7 plays, 75 yards, 2:27; Tied 14–14)
- (2:15) ASU – Cam Skattebo 2-yard run, Dario Longhetto kick (Drive: 4 plays, 75 yards, 2:32; Arizona State 21–14)
- (0:42) WSU – Lincoln Victor 9-yard pass from Cameron Ward, Dean Janikowski kick (Drive: 5 plays, 75 yards, 1:33; Tied 21–21)
- (0:00) ASU – Dario Longhetto 51-yard field goal (Drive: 7 plays, 42 yards, 0:42; Arizona State 24–21)

Third quarter

- (8:26) ASU – Elijhah Badger 6-yard run, Dario Longhetto kick (Drive: 12 plays, 75 yards, 6:34; Arizona State 31–21)
- (0:00) WSU – Dean Janikowski 31-yard field goal (Drive: 10 plays, 60 yards, 3:52; Arizona State 31–24)

Fourth quarter

- (13:53) ASU – DeCarlos Brooks 8-yard run, Dario Longhetto kick (Drive: 3 plays, 75 yards, 1:07; Arizona State 38–24)
- (8:33) WSU – Dean Janikowski 34-yard field goal (Drive: 13 plays, 48 yards, 5:20; Arizona State 38–27)

Statistics	WSU	ASU
First downs	26	25
Total yards	403	509
Rushes/yards	21–88	39–235
Passing yards	315	274
Passing: Comp–Att–Int	35–50–0	19–26–0
Time of possession	29:13	30:47

Team	Category	Player	Statistics
Washington State	Passing	Cameron Ward	35/50, 315 yards, TD
Washington State	Rushing	Cameron Ward	12 carries, 35 yards, 2 TD
Washington State	Receiving	Kyle Williams	8 receptions, 77 yards
Arizona State	Passing	Trenton Bourguet	19/26, 274 yards
Arizona State	Rushing	Cam Skattebo	11 carries, 121 yards, TD
Arizona State	Receiving	Jalin Conyers	4 receptions, 90 yards

=== at No. 18 Utah ===
Arizona State Sun Devils (2–6) at No. 18 Utah Utes (6–2) – Game summary

Quarter	1	2	3	4	Total
Sun Devils	3	0	0	0	3
No. 18 Utes	14	10	10	21	55

at Rice-Eccles Stadium • Salt Lake City, UT

- Date: November 4, 2023
- Game time: 11:00 a.m.
- Game weather: Sunny • Temperature: 61 °F (16 °C) • Wind: SW 4mph
- Game attendance: 52,104
- Referee: Justin Elliott
- TV announcers (P12N): JB Long, Lincoln Kennedy

Game information

First quarter

- (11:36) UTAH – Devaughn Vele 11-yard pass from Bryson Barnes, Cole Becker kick (Drive: 8 plays, 72 yards, 3:18; Utah 7–0)
- (6:37) UTAH – Devaughn Vele 3-yard pass from Bryson Barnes, Cole Becker kick (Drive: 8 plays, 65 yards, 3:38; Utah 14–0)
- (3:08) ASU – Dario Longhetto 35-yard field goal (Drive: 8 plays, 4 yards, 3:16; Utah 14–3)

Second quarter

- (4:05) UTAH – Cole Becker 30-yard field goal (Drive: 9 plays, 49 yards, 4:27; Utah 17–3)
- (0:54) UTAH – Munir McClain 20-yard pass from Bryson Barnes, Cole Becker kick (Drive: 10 plays, 68 yards, 1:41; Utah 24–3)

Third quarter

- (12:26) UTAH – Ja'Quinden Jackson 54-yard run, Cole Becker kick (Drive: 1 play, 54 yards, 0:09; Utah 31–3)
- (3:47) UTAH – Cole Becker 43-yard field goal (Drive: 4 plays, 3 yards, 2:16; Utah 34–3)

Fourth quarter

- (12:59) UTAH – Landen King 2-yard pass from Bryson Barnes, Cole Becker kick (Drive: 8 plays, 34 yards, 4:31; Utah 41–3)
- (11:04) UTAH – Nate Johnson 59-yard run, Cole Becker kick (Drive: 2 plays, 60 yards, 0:43; Utah 48–3)
- (0:08) UTAH – Charlie Vincent 22-yard run, Cole Becker kick (Drive: 7 plays, 44 yards, 4:32; Utah 55–3)

Statistics	ASU	UTAH
First downs	6	26
Total yards	83	513
Rushes/yards	29/43	49/352
Passing yards	40	161
Passing: Comp–Att–Int	8–29–1	19–28–0
Time of possession	23:27	36:33

Team	Category	Player	Statistics
Arizona State	Passing	Jacob Conover	5/22, 41 yards, INT
Arizona State	Rushing	Cameron Skattebo	12 carries, 31 yards
Arizona State	Receiving	Giovanni Sanders	1 reception, 20 yards
Utah	Passing	Bryson Barnes	19/28, 161 yards, 4 TD
Utah	Rushing	Ja'Quinden Jackson	13 carries, 111 yards, TD
Utah	Receiving	Devaughn Vele	7 receptions, 56 yards, 2 TD

=== at UCLA ===
Arizona State Sun Devils (2–7) at UCLA Bruins (6–3) – Game summary

Quarter	1	2	3	4	Total
Sun Devils	0	3	7	7	17
Bruins	0	0	0	7	7

at Rose Bowl • Pasadena, CA

- Date: November 11, 2023
- Game time: 7:00 p.m.
- Game weather: Clear, 68 °F (20 °C)
- Game attendance: 56,436
- Referee: Jeff Dahle
- TV announcers (P12N): J.B. Long, Lincoln Kennedy

Game information

First quarter

No scoring plays

Second quarter

- (7:54) ASU – Dario Langhetto 29-yard field goal (Drive: 10 plays, 64 yards, 4:47; Arizona State 3–0)

Third quarter

- (1:59) ASU – Elijah Badger 25-yard pass from Cam Skattebo, Dario Longhetto kick (Drive: 14 plays, 99 yards, 7:11; Arizona State 10–0)

Fourth quarter

- (9:47) UCLA – Logan Loya 16-yard pass from Collin Schlee, Blake Glessner kick (Drive: 6 plays, 59 yards, 1:58; Arizona State 10–7)
- (3:07) ASU – Cam Skattebo 17-yard run, Dario Longhetto kick (Drive: 12 plays, 75 yards, 6:40; Arizona State 17–7)

Statistics	ASU	UCLA
First downs	21	15
Total yards	250	300
Rushes/yards	30/74	37/183
Passing yards	176	117
Passing: Comp–Att–Int	22–39–1	11–21–0
Time of possession	36:54	23:06

Team	Category	Player	Statistics
Arizona State	Passing	Trenton Bourguet	19/34, 149 yards, INT
Arizona State	Rushing	Cam Skattebo	12 carries, 61 yards, TD
Arizona State	Receiving	Elijhah Badger	12 receptions, 116 yards, TD
UCLA	Passing	Collin Schlee	11/18, 117 yards, TD
UCLA	Rushing	Keegan Jones	3 carries, 51 yards
UCLA	Receiving	Logan Loya	3 receptions, 39 yards, TD

=== vs No. 6 Oregon ===
No. 6 Oregon Ducks (9–1) vs Arizona State Sun Devils (3–7) – Game summary

Quarter	1	2	3	4	Total
No. 6 Ducks	21	21	0	7	49
Sun Devils	0	0	3	10	13

at Mountain America Stadium • Tempe, AZ

- Date: November 18, 2023
- Game time: 2:00 p.m. MST
- Game attendance: 44,741
- Referee: Cravonne Barrett
- TV: FOX

Statistics	ORE	ASU
First downs	31	20
Total yards	603	316
Rushes/yards	33-140	18-11
Passing yards	463	205
Passing: Comp–Att–Int	28-36-2	25-47-1
Time of possession	32:58	27:02

Team	Category	Player	Statistics
Oregon	Passing	Bo Nix	24-29, 404 yards, 6 TD
Oregon	Rushing	Bucky Irving	11 carries, 63 yards
Oregon	Receiving	Troy Franklin	8 receptions, 128 yards, 2 TD
Arizona State	Passing	Trenton Bourguet	20-37, 142 yards
Arizona State	Rushing	Cameron Skattebo	8 carries, 49 yards
Arizona State	Receiving	Elijhah Badger	7 receptions, 64 yards

=== vs No. 15 Arizona ===
No. 15 Arizona Wildcats (8-3) vs Arizona State Sun Devils (3-8) – Game summary

Quarter	1	2	3	4	Total
No. 15 Wildcats	10	28	14	7	59
Sun Devils	7	0	8	8	23

at Mountain America Stadium • Tempe, AZ

- Date: November 25, 2023
- Game time: 1:30 p.m.
- Game weather: Sunny, 66 °F (19 °C)
- Game attendance: 53,414
- Referee: Mark Duddy
- TV announcers (ESPN): Mark Jones (play-by-play), Louis Riddick (analyst), Quint Kessenich (sideline reporter)

Game information

First quarter

- (11:57) ARIZ – Tyler Loop 35-yard field goal (Drive: 8 plays, 57 yards, 3:03; Arizona 3–0)
- (7:53) ASU – Cam Skattebo 4-yard run, Dario Longhetto kick (Drive: 7 plays, 75 yards, 4:04; Arizona State 7–3)
- (3:45) ARIZ – Tanner McLachlan 3-yard pass from Noah Fifita, Tyler Loop kick (Drive: 9 plays, 75 yards, 4:08; Arizona 10–7)

Second quarter

- (13:26) ARIZ – Jonah Coleman 4-yard run, Tyler Loop kick (Drive: 2 plays, 61 yards, 0:44; Arizona 17–7)
- (7:16) ARIZ – Michael Wiley 22-yard run, Tyler Loop kick (Drive: 6 plays, 77 yards, 2:40; Arizona 24–7)
- (2:12) ARIZ – Michael Wiley 1-yard run, Tyler Loop kick (Drive: 8 plays, 60 yards, 2:56; Arizona 31–7)
- (0:42) ARIZ – Michael Wiley 21-yard pass from Noah Fifita, Tyler Loop kick (Drive: 4 plays, 70 yards, 0:35; Arizona 38–7)

Third quarter

- (13:29) ARIZ – Tanner McLachlan 8-yard pass from Noah Fifita, Tyler Loop kick (Drive: 2 plays, 9 yards, 0:39; Arizona 45–7)
- (9:08) ARIZ – Tetairoa McMillan 50-yard pass from Noah Fifita, Tyler Loop kick (Drive: 3 plays, 53 yards, 1:11; Arizona 52–7)
- (4:04) ASU – Jalin Conyers 1-yard run, Jalin Conyers run for two-point conversion (Drive: 12 plays, 75 yards, 5:04; Arizona 52–15)

Fourth quarter

- (4:04) ASU – Troy Omeire 31-yard pass from Jaden Rashada, DeCarlos Brooks run for two-point conversion (Drive: 6 plays, 55 yards, 2:02; Arizona 52–23)
- (3:54) ARIZ – Jacob Cowing 1-yard pass from Noah Fifita, Tyler Loop kick (Drive: 7 plays, 39 yards, 4:36; Arizona 59–23)

Statistics	ARIZ	ASU
First downs	24	28
Total yards	619	306
Rushes/yards	25–92	42–224
Passing yards	527	82
Passing: Comp–Att–Int	30–41–1	10–23–2
Time of possession	30:03	29:57

Team	Category	Player	Statistics
Arizona	Passing	Noah Fifita	30/41, 527 yards, 5 TD, INT
Arizona	Rushing	Michael Wiley	12 carries, 66 yards, 2 TD
Arizona	Receiving	Tetairoa McMillan	11 receptions, 266 yards, TD
Arizona State	Passing	Jaden Rashada	10/22, 82 yards, TD, 2 INT
Arizona State	Rushing	Cameron Skattebo	17 carries, 108 yards, TD
Arizona State	Receiving	Troy Omeire	3 receptions, 38 yards, TD

== Statistics ==
As of November 26, 2023

=== Individual Leaders ===
==== Passing ====
Passing statistics (Note: Accounts only for GS as QB)
Player	GP	GS	Record	Cmp	Att	Pct	Yds	Avg	TD	Int	Rtg
Trenton Bourguet	8	6	1–5	151	248	60.9	1,486	6.0	1	4	109.3
Jaden Rashada	3	2	1–1	44	82	53.7	485	5.9	4	3	116.8
Drew Pyne	2	1	0–1	26	49	53.1	273	5.6	2	3	101.1
Cameron Skattebo	12	7	0–1	6	15	40.0	130	8.7	1	1	121.5
Jacob Conover	3	0	—	11	38	28.9	130	3.4	0	3	41.9
Jalin Conyers	11	5	1–1	5	6	83.3	20	3.3	0	0	111.3
Totals	12	12	3–9	243	440	55.2	2,524	5.7	8	14	103.0

==== Rushing & Receiving ====
Rushing & Receiving statistics
Player	GP	GS	Att	Yds	Avg	TD	Rec	Yds	Avg	TD
Cameron Skattebo	12	7	164	783	4.8	9	24	286	11.9	1
DeCarlos Brooks	5	1	48	259	5.4	3	7	47	6.7	0
Trenton Bourguet	8	6	26	68	2.6	2	1	18	18.0	0
Kyson Brown	12	4	23	106	4.6	0	9	49	5.4	0
Jalin Conyers	11	5	22	92	4.2	1	30	362	12.1	0
Jaden Rashada	3	2	14	23	1.6	0				
Drew Pyne	2	1	14	-49	-3.5	0	1	17	17.0	0
Elijhah Badger	11	9	11	51	4.6	1	65	713	11.0	3
Tevin White	11	0	11	23	2.1	0	1	4	4.0	0
Jacob Conover	3	0	10	-5	-0.5	0				
Kaleb Black	3	0	4	4	1.0	0	1	-2	-2.0	0
Melquan Stovall	12	9	3	21	7.0	1	18	207	11.5	0
Javen Jacobs	5	0	3	8	2.7	0				
Giovanni Sanders	12	5	2	-1	-0.5	0	15	133	8.9	0
Xavier Guillory	9	6	1	0	0.0	0	21	226	10.8	1
Shawn Charles	7	1	1	-10	-10.0	0				
Troy Omeire	9	6					20	223	11.2	3
Bryce Pierre	12	4					17	139	8.2	0
Messiah Swinson	12	3					6	48	8.0	0
Andre Johnson	9	0					4	36	9.0	0
Ryan Morgan	12	3					2	13	6.5	0
Totals	12	12	364	1,375	3.7	17	243	2,524	10.3	8
