= 2025 Peach Bowl =

College Football Playoff Quarterfinal bowl game

2025 Chick-fil-A Peach Bowl
- College Football Playoff Quarterfinal; 57th Peach Bowl
Texas Longhorns	Arizona State Sun Devils
(12–2)	(11–2)
SEC	Big 12
39	31
Head coach: Steve Sarkisian	Head coach: Kenny Dillingham
AP / Coaches / CFP; 4 / 4 / 3	AP / Coaches / CFP; 10 / 10 / 12
	1	2	3	4	OT	2OT	Total
Texas	14	3	0	7	7	8	39
Arizona State	3	0	5	16	7	0	31
- Date: January 1, 2025
- Season: 2024
- Stadium: Mercedes-Benz Stadium
- Location: Atlanta, Georgia
- MVP: Offense: Cam Skattebo (RB, Arizona State); Defense: Jahdae Barron (DB, Texas)
- Favorite: Texas by 13.5
- National anthem: Casey Kearney
- Referee: Larry Smith (Big Ten)
- Attendance: 71,105

United States TV coverage
- Network: ESPN
- Announcers: Joe Tessitore (play-by-play); Jesse Palmer (analyst); Katie George (sideline); Taylor McGregor (sideline)

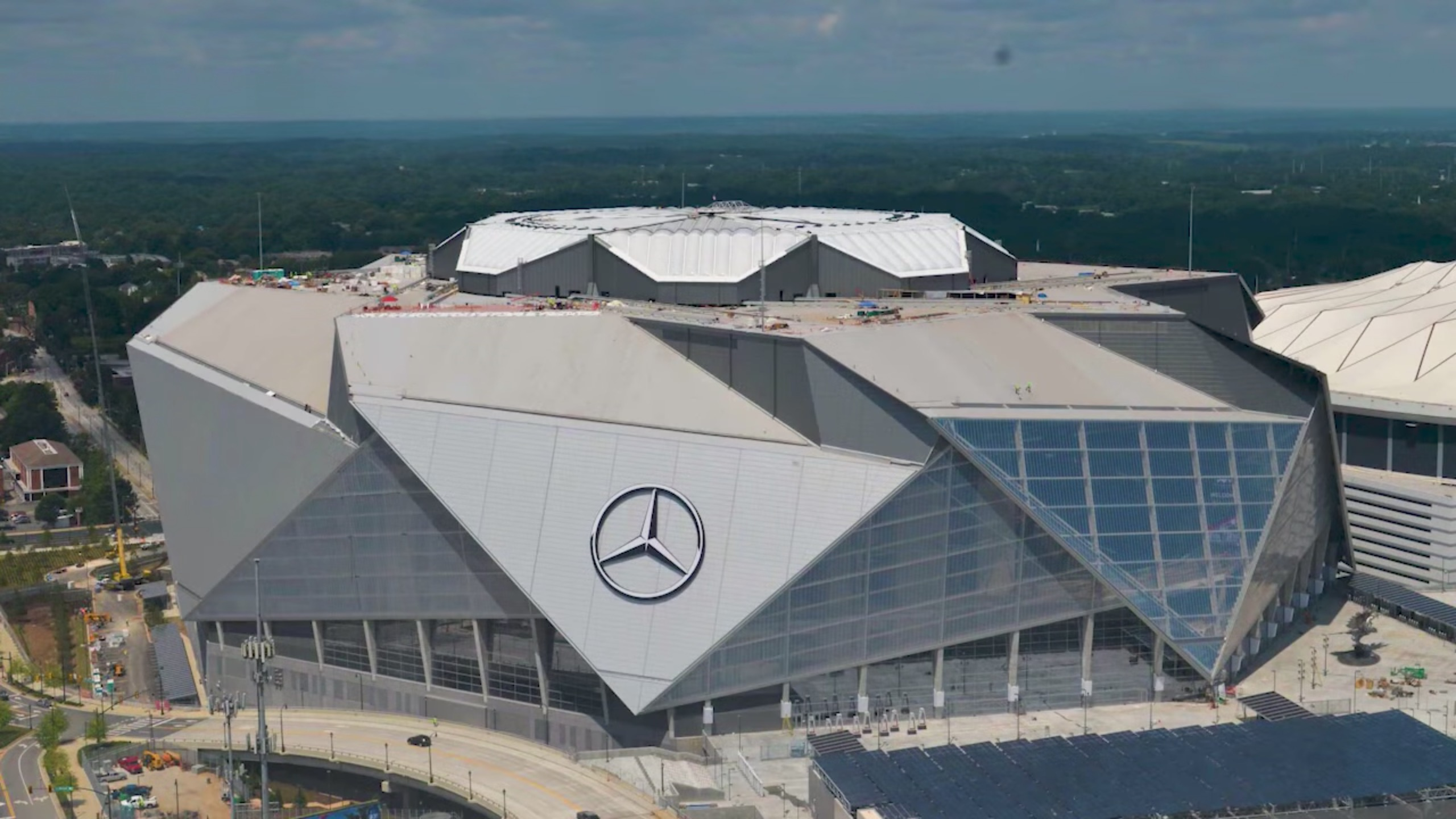
Mercedes-Benz Stadium in Atlanta, Georgia, hosted the Peach Bowl.

The 2025 Peach Bowl was a college football bowl game played on January 1, 2025, at Mercedes-Benz Stadium in Atlanta, Georgia. The 57th annual Peach Bowl game was one of the College Football Playoff (CFP) quarterfinal games and featured Texas and Arizona State. The Peach Bowl was one of the 2024–25 bowl games concluding the 2024 FBS football season. Sponsored by restaurant chain Chick-fil-A, the game was officially known as the College Football Playoff Quarterfinal at the Chick-fil-A Peach Bowl.

== Background ==
The 2025 Peach Bowl was a quarterfinal game for the College Football Playoff (CFP). Arizona State, the number 12 team in the final CFP rankings and winner of the Big 12 Championship Game, received a bye in the new 12-team format of the CFP and was selected to play in the bowl game as the tournament's fourth seed.

The 12th seed, Clemson (16th in the final CFP rankings), and fifth seed, Texas (third in the final CFP rankings), competed for the other spot in the Peach Bowl. On December 21, Texas defeated Clemson, 38–24.

This was the second all-time meeting between the Sun Devils and the Longhorns, with the first meeting taking place in the 2007 Holiday Bowl, won by Texas. The winner of the Peach Bowl advanced to the Cotton Bowl to face the winner of the Rose Bowl.

First round			Peach Bowl
			4	Arizona State	31
12	Clemson	24	5	Texas (2OT)	39
5	Texas	38

== Teams ==
=== Arizona State Sun Devils ===
Arizona State entered the game as the Big 12 Conference champions with an 11–2 record (7–2 in conference), their first season in the conference. Ranked 12th in the final CFP poll, the Sun Devils received the fourth seed in the playoff bracket, due to their conference championship. This was the second Peach Bowl appearance for Arizona State, having previously won the 1970 edition.

=== Texas Longhorns ===
Texas played to an 11–1 record (7–1 in conference) during the regular season; their only loss was to Georgia. The Longhorns qualified for the SEC Championship Game, where they lost a rematch to Georgia. Ranked third in the final CFP poll, the Longhorns received the fifth seed in the playoff tournament. Texas played and defeated Clemson in a first-round game to advance to the Peach Bowl. They entered the bowl with an overall 12–2 record.

== Game summary ==
=== First half ===
The Arizona State Sun Devils received the opening kickoff, finishing the game's first drive with a 39-yard field goal. The Texas Longhorns, led by quarterback Quinn Ewers, answered with a touchdown caught by DeAndre Moore. Arizona State proceeded to go three-and-out on their next possession, punting to returner Silas Bolden who made a 75-yard run for another touchdown, bringing Texas to a 14-3 lead by the end of the first quarter. The Sun Devils offense struggled in the second quarter, making two turnovers on downs followed by a blocked field goal on their next drive, with lead rusher Cam Skattebo being held to only 54 yards during the first half of the game. On the other hand, the Longhorns were able to net a field goal, and the first half ended with a 17-3 Texas lead.

=== Second half ===
In the third quarter, the Sun Devils made a strong push to the goal line, but they were stuffed on fourth down only 2 yards away from the Texas end zone, turning the ball over to the Longhorns. On the next play, the ball was fumbled into the end zone. Ewers recovered the fumble but was quickly tackled by Shamari Simmons for an Arizona State safety. The next drive produced another field goal for the Sun Devils, bringing the game to 17-8.

Texas had possession of the ball at the start of the fourth quarter, and finished their drive with another touchdown made by Ewers on a five yard scramble. With Texas leading 24-8 and only ten minutes left in the clock, the fate of the game appeared to be in the Longhorns' hands. Skattebo was shown on broadcast vomiting "profusely" on the sideline, which he later attributed to a breakfast sandwich. The Sun Devils were able to mount a slow drive in response, chaining nine plays to reach the Texas 42-yard line. On a game-deciding fourth-and-2, with 6:42 left on the clock, Skattebo unexpectedly grabbed the ball and launched it down the field for his only pass of the game. Malik McClain, who had only appeared in one other game as a redshirt that season, caught the ball and ran it to the end zone for a celebrated 42-yard touchdown, followed by a successful two-point conversion that brought the game to an 8-point deficit.

Momentum continued to shift in Arizona State's favor, as just two plays later, Ewers threw a deep ball that was intercepted by cornerback Javan Robinson on the ASU 21-yard line. On the next play of the game, quarterback Sam Leavitt immediately threw a 62-yard pass to Skattebo, who wrestled several yards upfield with his helmet flying off as he was tackled. The play was called for a face mask penalty against the Longhorns, bringing the Sun Devils back into the red zone after just one play. Following an incomplete pass and a defensive pass interference penalty, Skattebo was able to finish the drive with a 2-yard rush for a touchdown. Skattebo also rushed for another successful two-point conversion, bringing the game to an unanticipated tie.

However, the Longhorns now had possession of the ball with five minutes left on the clock. Texas marched to the ASU 30-yard line but were halted on fourth down, giving them an opportunity for a 48-yard field goal to break the tie with long-time Texas kicker Bert Auburn. But the Longhorns missed the kick. With 1:39 on the clock, the Sun Devils attempted to break the tie themselves, but they were unable to reach field goal range, and were forced to punt back to the Longhorns. Ewers led a strong drive all the way to the 20-yard line, giving them another chance for a 39-yard field goal. With two seconds left in regulation, the Longhorns brought out Auburn again, who was 10 for 10 on field goals under 40 yards for the season. Auburn's kick bounced off the uprights, narrowly missing the field goal and bringing the game into overtime.

=== Overtime ===
The Sun Devils won the coin flip for first possession to start overtime, and through a series of runs by Leavitt and Skattebo, made it to the end zone for a touchdown on a 3-yard rush by Skattebo. The Longhorns would now need to make a touchdown their next possession or they would lose the game. After two unsuccessful passes, an unsuccessful rush, and a penalty, the Longhorns had the game on the line on 4th-and-13. Ewers noticed a blitz from Arizona State and called a max protect audible (meaning Tight End Gunnar Helm joined the five offensive linemen and running back in pass protection), following which he delivered a 28-yard pass to receiver Matthew Golden who caught it in the endzone for a touchdown, bringing the game into double overtime.

Texas received the ball again to start, and on their first play, Ewers completed a 25-yard pass to tight end Gunnar Helm for another touchdown, followed by a successful two-point conversion caught by Golden. With the roles now reversed, Arizona State had possession of the ball with the game on the line. Leavitt made a 13-yard pass to Skattebo to bring the Sun Devils to the 12-yard line, followed by an incomplete pass and a 2-yard rush that brought the game to 3rd down on the 10-yard line. Leavitt threw a pass intended for Melquan Stovall, but it was ultimately intercepted by Texas safety Andrew Mukuba, ending the game by possession. The Texas Longhorns won the game 39-31 after two overtimes, allowing them to advance in the playoffs. The game was regarded as one of the greatest Peach Bowls of all time.

=== Scoring summary ===
College Football Playoff Quarterfinal at the 2025 Chick-fil-A Peach Bowl

Quarter	1	2	3	4	OT	2OT	Total
(5) No. 3 Texas	14	3	0	7	7	8	39
(4) No. 12 Arizona State	3	0	5	16	7	0	31

at Mercedes-Benz Stadium • Atlanta, Georgia

- Date: Wednesday, January 1, 2025
- Game time: 1:10 p.m. EST
- Game weather: Indoor
- Game attendance: 71,105
- Referee: Larry Smith
- TV announcers (ESPN): Joe Tessitore (play-by-play), Jesse Palmer (analyst), Katie George and Taylor McGregor (sideline)
- Box score

Scoring summary

Quarter	Time	Drive			Team	Scoring information	Score	
Quarter	Time	Plays	Yards	TOP	Team	Scoring information	Texas	Arizona State
1	8:59	12	63	6:01	Arizona State	39-yard field goal by Carston Kieffer	0	3
1	8:14	2	77	1:21	Texas	DeAndre Moore Jr. 23-yard touchdown reception from Quinn Ewers, Bert Auburn kick good	7	3
1	7:08				Texas	Punt returned 75 yards for touchdown by Silas Bolden, Bert Auburn kick good	14	3
2	8:54	13	72	6:02	Texas	22-yard field goal by Bert Auburn	17	3
3	7:38				Arizona State	Quinn Ewers tackled in end zone for a safety by Shamari Simmons	17	5
3	0:41	11	50	6:57	Arizona State	36-yard field goal by Carston Kieffer	17	8
4	10:17	13	76	5:24	Texas	Quinn Ewers 5-yard touchdown run, Bert Auburn kick good	24	8
4	6:31	10	75	3:46	Arizona State	Malik McClain 42-yard touchdown reception from Cam Skattebo, 2-point pass to Xavier Guillory good	24	16
4	5:00	3	79	0:37	Arizona State	Cam Skattebo 2-yard touchdown run, 2-point run by Cam Skattebo good	24	24
OT		8	25		Arizona State	Cam Skattebo 3-yard touchdown run, Carston Kieffer kick good	24	31
OT		4	25		Texas	Matthew Golden 28-yard touchdown reception from Quinn Ewers, Bert Auburn kick good	31	31
2OT		1	25		Texas	Gunnar Helm 25-yard touchdown reception from Quinn Ewers, 2-point pass to Matthew Golden good	39	31
"TOP" = time of possession. For other American football terms, see Glossary of American football.							39	31

=== Statistics ===
Team statistical comparison
Statistic	Texas	Arizona State
First downs	17	28
First downs rushing	3	15
First downs passing	13	10
First downs penalty	1	3
Third down efficiency	5–13	10–24
Fourth down efficiency	2–2	3–6
Total plays–net yards	60–375	97–510
Rushing attempts–net yards	30–53	49–214
Yards per rush	1.8	4.4
Yards passing	322	296
Pass completions–attempts	20–30	26–48
Interceptions thrown	1	1
Punt returns–total yards	2–87	1–8
Kickoff returns–total yards	2–29	1–17
Punts–average yardage	3–48.7	3–40.0
Fumbles–lost	1–0	0–0
Penalties–yards	10–68	6–50
Time of possession	22:06	37:54

Texas statistics
Longhorns passing
	C–A	Yds	TD–INT
Quinn Ewers	20–30	322	3–1
Longhorns rushing
	Car	Yds	TD
Quintrevion Wisner	18	45	0
Silas Bolden	1	5	0
Jaydon Blue	4	4	0
Quinn Ewers	6	1	1
Longhorns receiving
	Rec	Yds	TD
Matthew Golden	7	149	1
Quintrevion Wisner	4	40	0
Gunnar Helm	3	56	1
Ryan Wingo	2	33	0
DeAndre Moore Jr.	2	25	1
Jaydon Blue	1	11	0
Juan Davis	1	8	0

Arizona State statistics
Sun Devils passing
	C–A	Yds	TD–INT
Sam Leavitt	24–46	222	0–1
Cam Skattebo	1–1	42	1–0
Kanyon Floyd	1–1	32	0–0
Sun Devils rushing
	Car	Yds	TD
Cam Skattebo	30	143	2
Sam Leavitt	13	60	0
Kyson Brown	5	11	0
Melquan Stovall	1	0	0
Sun Devils receiving
	Rec	Yds	TD
Cam Skattebo	8	99	0
Melquan Stovall	7	34	0
Xavier Guillory	3	19	0
Chamon Metayer	3	16	0
Troy Omeire	2	40	0
Malik McClain	1	42	1
Blazen Lono-Wong	1	32	0
Kyson Brown	1	14	0
