= List of Big 12 Conference football champions =

This is a list of yearly Big 12 Conference football champions. Champions are determined in a head to head matchup in the Big 12 Championship Game held at the end of the regular season. The game was played each year since the conference's formation in 1996 until 2010 and returned during the 2017 season. From 1996 to 2010 the championship game pitted the Big 12 North Division champion against the South Division champion in a game held after the regular season was completed.

Between 2011 and 2016, the championship was earned in round-robin regular-season play among all conference members. Until 2014, the league did not employ tiebreaking procedures, such as head-to-head results, to determine a single champion, and thus it was not unusual for a season to end with "co-champions." However with the 2015 season, head-to-head results will decide if two teams finish tied.

From 2017 onward, the championship game features the two teams with the best conference records. The champion usually is invited to the Sugar Bowl unless selected to play in one of the national semifinals for the College Football Playoff. Co-champions are listed in alphabetical order. Co-champions are no longer possible as the Big 12 Conference has switched to using a Conference Championship game to determine the winner.

== Champions by year ==
		Record		Ranking			
Year	Champions	Conference	Overall	AP	Coaches'	Bowl result	Head coach
1996	Texas	6–2	8–5	No. 23	No. 23	L Fiesta Bowl 15−38 vs. Penn State	John Mackovic
1997	**Nebraska**	8−0	13−0	No. 2	No. 1	**W** Orange Bowl 42−17 vs. Tennessee	Tom Osborne
1998	Texas A&M	7−1	11−3	No. 11	No. 13	L Sugar Bowl 14−24 vs. Ohio State	R. C. Slocum
1999	Nebraska	7−1	12−1	No. 3	No. 2	**W** Fiesta Bowl 31−21 vs. Tennessee	Frank Solich
2000	**Oklahoma**	8−0	13−0	No. 1	No. 1	**W** Orange Bowl 13−2 vs. Florida State	Bob Stoops
2001	Colorado	7−1	10−3	No. 9	No. 9	L Fiesta Bowl 15−38 vs. Oregon	Gary Barnett
2002	Oklahoma	6−2	12−2	No. 5	No. 5	**W** Rose Bowl 34−14 vs. Washington State	Bob Stoops
2003	Kansas State	6−2	11−4	No. 14	No. 13	L Fiesta Bowl 28−35 vs. Ohio State	Bill Snyder
2004	Oklahoma	8−0	12−1	No. 3	No. 3	L Orange Bowl 19−55 vs. USC	Bob Stoops
2005	**Texas**	8−0	13−0	No. 1	No. 1	**W** Rose Bowl 41−38 vs. USC	Mack Brown
2006	Oklahoma	7−1	11−3	No. 11	No. 11	L Fiesta Bowl 42−43 vs. Boise State	Bob Stoops
2007	Oklahoma	6−2	11−3	No. 8	No. 8	L Fiesta Bowl 28−48 vs. West Virginia	Bob Stoops
2008	Oklahoma	7−1	12−2	No. 5	No. 5	L BCS National Championship Game 14−24 vs. Florida	Bob Stoops
2009	Texas	8−0	13−1	No. 2	No. 2	L BCS National Championship Game 21−37 vs. Alabama	Mack Brown
2010	Oklahoma	6−2	12−2	No. 6	No. 6	**W** Fiesta Bowl 48−20 vs. Connecticut	Bob Stoops
2011	Oklahoma State	8−1	12−1	No. 3	No. 3	**W** Fiesta Bowl 41−38 vs. Stanford	Mike Gundy
2012	Kansas State	8−1	11−2	No. 12	No. 11	L Fiesta Bowl 17−35 vs. Oregon	Bill Snyder
2012	Oklahoma	8−1	11−2	No. 15	No. 15	L Cotton Bowl Classic 13−41 vs. Texas A&M	Bob Stoops
2013	Baylor	8−1	11−2	No. 13	No. 13	L Fiesta Bowl 42−52 vs. UCF	Art Briles
2014	Baylor	8−1	11−2	No. 7	No. 8	L Cotton Bowl Classic 41−42 vs. Michigan State	Art Briles
2014	TCU	8−1	12−1	No. 3	No. 3	**W** Peach Bowl 42−3 vs. Ole Miss	Gary Patterson
2015	Oklahoma	8−1	11−2	No. 5	No. 5	L CFP Semifinal at Orange Bowl 17−37 vs. Clemson	Bob Stoops
2016	Oklahoma	9−0	11−2	No. 5	No. 3	**W** Sugar Bowl 35−19 vs. Auburn	Bob Stoops
2017	Oklahoma	8−1	12−2	No. 3	No. 3	L CFP Semifinal at Rose Bowl 48−54 vs. Georgia	Lincoln Riley
2018	Oklahoma	8−1	12−2	No. 4	No. 4	L CFP Semifinal at Orange Bowl 34−45 vs. Alabama	Lincoln Riley
2019	Oklahoma	8−1	12−2	No. 7	No. 6	L CFP Semifinal at Peach Bowl 28−63 vs. LSU	Lincoln Riley
2020	Oklahoma	6−2	8−2	No. 6	No. 6	**W** Cotton Bowl Classic 55-20 vs. Florida	Lincoln Riley
2021	Baylor	7−2	12−2	No. 5	No.6	**W** Sugar Bowl 21-7 vs. Ole Miss	Dave Aranda
2022	Kansas State	7−2	10−3	No. 14	No. 14	L Sugar Bowl 45-20 vs. Alabama	Chris Klieman
2023	Texas	8−1	12−1	No. 3	No. 4	L CFP Semifinal at Sugar Bowl 37-31 vs. Washington	Steve Sarkisian
2024	Arizona State	7−2	11−2	No. 10	No. 10	L CFP Quarterfinal at Peach Bowl 39-31 vs. Texas	Kenny Dillingham
2025	Texas Tech	8−1	12−1	No. 4	No. 4	L CFP Quarterfinal at Orange Bowl 23-0 vs. Oregon	Joey McGuire

Bold indicates a national championship.

== Championships by team ==
Team	Big 12 Championships	Years
Oklahoma*	14	2000, 2002, 2004, 2006, 2007, 2008, 2010, 2012, 2015, 2016, 2017, 2018, 2019, 2020
Texas*	4	1996, 2005, 2009, 2023
Baylor	3	2013, 2014, 2021
Kansas State	3	2003, 2012, 2022
Nebraska*	2	1997, 1999
Colorado	1	2001
Oklahoma State	1	2011
TCU	1	2014
Texas A&M*	1	1998
Arizona State	1	2024
Texas Tech	1	2025
Arizona	0	
BYU	0	
Cincinnati	0	
Houston	0	
Iowa State	0	
Kansas	0	
Missouri*	0	
UCF	0	
Utah	0	
West Virginia	0	

Italics indicate a shared title.
* indicates a school no longer competing in the Big 12.

== Big 12 Championship Game ==
Since 2017, the championship game has determined the conference champion. The game features the two teams with the best conference records. From the inaugural championship game in 1996 to 2010 the championship game pitted the Big 12 North Division champion against the South Division champion in a game held after the regular season was completed. From 2011 to 2016, a round-robin would determine the champion.

Year	North Division		South Division	
1996	No. 3 Nebraska	27	Texas	37
1997	No. 2 Nebraska	54	No. 14 Texas A&M	15
1998	No. 2 Kansas State	33	No. 10 Texas A&M	36
1999	No. 3 Nebraska	22	No. 12 Texas	6
2000	No. 8 Kansas State	24	No. 1 Oklahoma	27
2001	No. 9 Colorado	39	No. 3 Texas	37
2002	No. 12 Colorado	7	No. 8 Oklahoma	29
2003	No. 13 Kansas State	35	No. 1 Oklahoma	7
2004	Colorado	3	No. 2 Oklahoma	42
2005	Colorado	3	No. 2 Texas	70
2006	No. 19 Nebraska	7	No. 8 Oklahoma	21
2007	No. 1 Missouri	17	No. 9 Oklahoma	38
2008	No. 19 Missouri	21	No. 4 Oklahoma	62
2009	21 Nebraska	12	No. 3 Texas	13
2010	No. 13 Nebraska	20	No. 10 Oklahoma	23
Year	No. 1 Seed		No. 2 Seed	
2017	No. 2 Oklahoma	41	No. 10 TCU	17
2018	No. 5 Oklahoma	39	No. 14 Texas	27
2019	No. 6 Oklahoma	30	No. 7 Baylor	23
2020	No. 6 Iowa State	21	No. 10 Oklahoma	27
2021	No. 5 Oklahoma State	16	No. 9 Baylor	21
2022	No. 3 TCU	28	No. 10 Kansas State	31
2023	No. 7 Texas	49	No. 18 Oklahoma State	21
2024	No. 16 Arizona State	45	No. 18 Iowa State	19
2025	No. 4 Texas Tech	34	No. 11 BYU	7

== Championships by head coach ==
Head coach	School	Big 12 Championships
Bob Stoops	Oklahoma	10
Lincoln Riley	Oklahoma	4
Art Briles	Baylor	2
Bill Snyder	Kansas State	2
Mack Brown	Texas	2
Steve Sarkisian	Texas	1
**Dave Aranda**	Baylor	1
Frank Solich	Nebraska	1
Gary Barnett	Colorado	1
Gary Patterson	TCU	1
John Mackovic	Texas	1
Mike Gundy	Oklahoma State	1
R. C. Slocum	Texas A&M	1
Tom Osborne	Nebraska	1
Chris Klieman	Kansas State	1
**Kenny Dillingham**	Arizona State	1
**Joey McGuire**	Texas Tech	1

Active coaches are in bold
