= 2024 Big 12 Championship Game =

2024 Dr Pepper Big 12 Championship Game
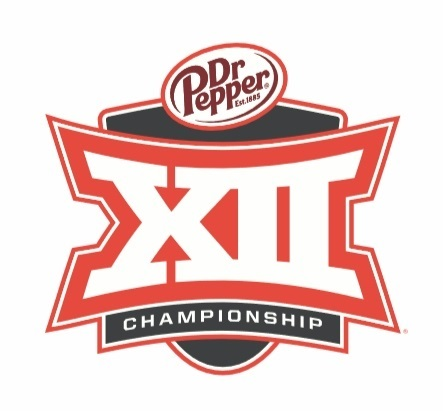
Iowa State Cyclones	Arizona State Sun Devils
(10–2)	(10–2)
19	45
Head coach: Matt Campbell	Head coach: Kenny Dillingham
AP / Coaches / CFP; 16 / 16 / 16	AP / Coaches / CFP; 12 / 13 / 15
	1	2	3	4	Total
Iowa State	7	3	0	9	19
Arizona State	10	14	21	0	45
- Date: December 7, 2024
- Season: 2024
- Stadium: AT&T Stadium
- Location: Arlington, Texas
- Referee: Michael Vandervelde
- Halftime show: Ne-Yo
- Attendance: 55,889

United States TV coverage
- Network: ABC; ESPN+ ESPN Radio
- Announcers: ABC/ESPN+: Joe Tessitore (play-by-play), Jesse Palmer (analyst), and Katie George (sideline reporter); ESPN Radio: Mike Couzens (play-by-play), Max Starks (analyst), and Mike Peasley (sideline reporter)

International TV coverage
- Network: Canada: TSN2; Brazil: ESPN Brazil

2024 Big 12 Conference football standings
	Conf.			Overall
Team	W		L	W		L
No. 7 Arizona State y$^	7	–	2	11	–	3
No. 15 Iowa State y	7	–	2	11	–	3
No. 13 BYU	7	–	2	11	–	2
No. 25 Colorado	7	–	2	9	–	4
Baylor	6	–	3	8	–	5
TCU	6	–	3	9	–	4
Texas Tech	6	–	3	8	–	5
Kansas State	5	–	4	9	–	4
West Virginia	5	–	4	6	–	7
Kansas	4	–	5	5	–	7
Cincinnati	3	–	6	5	–	7
Houston	3	–	6	4	–	8
Utah	2	–	7	5	–	7
UCF	2	–	7	4	–	8
Arizona	2	–	7	4	–	8
Oklahoma State	0	–	9	3	–	9
Championship: Arizona State 45, Iowa State 19
^ – College Football Playoff participant; $ – Conference champion; y – Championship game participant; Rankings from AP Poll

The 2024 Big 12 Championship Game was a college football game that was played on December 7, 2024, at AT&T Stadium in Arlington, Texas. It was the 23rd edition of the Big 12 Championship Game, and determined the champion of the Big 12 Conference for the 2024 season. The game aired on ABC at 12:00 noon EST. The game featured the Arizona State Sun Devils and the Iowa State Cyclones. Arizona State defeated Iowa State 45–19, earning an automatic bid in the 2024–25 College Football Playoff.

== Overview ==
=== Team selection ===
With the addition of four new teams, bring the conference total to sixteen total, the conference created new tiebreaking scenarios due to conference teams have imbalanced schedules.

==== Two-team tiebreaker ====
1. The tied teams will be compared based on their head-to-head record during the season.
2. The tied teams will be compared based on win percentage against all common conference opponents.
3. The tied teams will be compared based on win percentage against the next highest-placed common opponent in the standings (based on the record in all games played within the Conference) proceeding through the standings.
4. The tied teams will be compared based on combined win percentage in conference games of conference opponents.
5. The tied teams will be compared based on total number of wins in a 12-game season.
6. The representative will be chosen based on highest ranking by SportSource Analytics (team rating score metric) following the last weekend of regular-season games.
7. The representative will be chosen by a coin toss.

==== Multiple-team tiebreaker ====
1. The records of the three (or more) tied teams will be compared based on winning percentage in games among the tied teams:
A. If all teams involved in the tie did not play each other, but one team defeated all other teams involved in the tie, the team that defeated all other teams in the tie is removed from the tiebreaker, and the remaining teams revert to the beginning of the applicable tiebreaker process (i.e., two team or three or more team tie).
B. If all teams involved in the tie did not play each other and no team defeated all other teams involved in the tie, move to the next step in tiebreaker.
2. The records of the three (or more) tied teams will be compared based on winning percentage against all common conference opponents played by all other teams involved in the tie.
3. Record of the three (or more) tied teams against the next highest placed common opponent in the standings (based on the record in all games played within the conference), proceeding through the standings. When arriving at another group of tied teams while comparing records, use each team's win percentage against the collective tied teams as a group (prior to that group's own tie-breaking procedure) rather than the performance against individual tied teams.
4. Record of the three (or more) tied teams based on combined win percentage in conference games of conference opponents (i.e., strength of conference schedule)
5. Total number of wins in a 12-game season. The following conditions will apply to the calculation of the total number of wins: Only one win against a team from the NCAA Football Championship Subdivision or lower division will be counted annually. Any games that are exempted from counting against the annual maximum number of football contests per NCAA rules. (Current Bylaw 17.10.5.2.1) shall not be included.
6. Highest ranking by SportSource Analytics (team Rating Score metric) following the last weekend of regular-season games.
7. Coin toss

==== Implementing the tiebreakers ====
As there were four teams tied for the best record in the conference, the "Multiple-team tiebreaker" was used. No team had defeated or lost to the other three, so step 1 was skipped. On step 2, the teams were assessed on their records against common opponents: Kansas, Kansas State, UCF, and Utah. Arizona State was 4–0, BYU 3–1, Iowa State 3–1, and Colorado 2–2 against those four teams, so Arizona State received the #1 seed. The tiebreaker then reset to determine the #2 seed from the other three teams. Again, record against common opponents was used, with Baylor joining the four teams listed above. As all three teams had beaten Baylor, BYU and Iowa State were still ahead of Colorado, which was eliminated. BYU and Iowa State proceeded to the two-team tiebreaker, and since they had the same results against each common opponent, steps 2 and 3 were indecisive. Step 4, assessing Big 12 strength of schedule, resolved the tie in favor of Iowa State: Iowa State's opponents had a combined record of 36–45 within the conference, while BYU's had a record of 31–50.

This will be first time that Iowa State and Arizona State have ever played each other.

=== Iowa State ===
After being picked to finish sixth in the preseason polls, Iowa State jumped out to their best start in program history by winning their first seven games. They stumbled a bit with losses to Texas Tech and Kansas to fall out of the polls but rebounded with three straight wins to close out the season, punctuated by a win over Kansas State in the annual "Farmageddon" that combined with a BYU victory clinched a spot for Iowa State. This is their first Big 12 Championship appearance since 2020; Iowa State was looking for their first conference championship since 1912, the longest drought in FBS history.

=== Arizona State ===
In their first season as a Big 12 member, Arizona State was projected by media members to finish last. They won just two of their first four conference games before jumping on to a five-game winning streak (with one over 14th-ranked BYU) to close out the season, punctuated by a win over Arizona to clinch their spot. This is Arizona State's first conference championship game appearance since the 2013 Pac-12 Football Championship Game; the Sun Devils was looking for their first conference championship since 2007 and first outright title since 1996.

== Game summary ==
=== Scoring summary ===
2024 Big 12 Championship Game
No. 15 Arizona State Sun Devils (10–2, 7–2) vs. No. 16 Iowa State Cyclones (10–2, 7–2)

Quarter	1	2	3	4	Total
No. 16 Iowa State	7	3	0	9	19
No. 15 Arizona State	10	14	21	0	45

at AT&T Stadium • Arlington, TX

- Date: Saturday, December 7, 2024
- Game time: 11:00 a.m. CST (kickoff TBD)
- Game weather: Indoor (retractable roof closed)
- Game attendance: 55,889
- Referee: Michael Vandervelde
- TV announcers (ABC): Joe Tessitore (play-by-play), Jesse Palmer (analyst), and Katie George (sideline reporter)

Despite the Cyclones taking an early 7–3 lead and the game being tied 10–10 in the mid-second quarter, the Cyclones, trailed 24–10 at halftime. Then, they turned the ball over in their own territory in their first 3 drives after halftime. The Sun Devils capitalized by scoring three touchdowns to take a 45–10 lead. Iowa State responded by kicking a field goal and scoring a touchdown, but a failed two point conversion kept the game at 45–19, which was the games final score.

== Statistics ==
=== Team statistics ===
Team statistical comparison
Statistic	Iowa State	Arizona State
First downs	23	17
First downs rushing	10	10
First downs passing	10	7
First downs penalty	3	0
Third down efficiency	7–14	5–12
Fourth down efficiency	1–1	2–3
Total plays–net yards	70–341	57–464
Rushing attempts–net yards	32–127	39–245
Yards per rush	4.0	6.3
Yards passing	214	219
Pass completions–attempts	21–38	12–18
Interceptions thrown	1	0
Punt returns–total yards	0–0	1–0
Kickoff returns–total yards	1–22	0–0
Punts–total yardage	2–105	2–67
Fumbles–lost	2–2	0–0
Penalties–yards	2–10	7–64
Time of possession	29:33	30:27

=== Individual statistics ===
Iowa State statistics
Cyclones passing
	C–A	Yds	TD–INT
Rocco Becht	21–35	214	2–1
Cyclones rushing
	Car	Yds	TD
Carson Hansen	10	52	0
Abu Sama	8	27	0
Rocco Becht	5	23	0
Cyclones receiving
	Rec	Yds	TD
Jayden Higgins	7	115	0
Jaylin Noel	5	64	1
Gabe Burkle	4	1	1

Arizona State statistics
Sun Devils passing
	C–A	Yds	TD–INT
Sam Leavitt	12–17	219	3–0
Sun Devils rushing
	Car	Yds	TD
Cam Skattebo	16	170	2
Sam Leavitt	7	33	1
Jeff Sims	6	31	0
DeCarlos Brooks	5	12	0
Kyson Brown	2	2	0
(Team)	3	–3	0
Sun Devils receiving
	Rec	Yds	TD
Melquan Stovall	4	91	0
Malik McClain	1	43	0
Cam Skattebo	2	38	1
Xavier Guillory	2	29	2
Kyson Brown	2	13	0
Chamon Metayer	1	5	0

== See also ==
- List of Big 12 Conference football champions
