= Malik McClain =

American football player (born 2002)

No. 84 – New York Jets
- Position: Wide receiver
- Roster status: Active

Personal information
- Born: October 8, 2002 (age 24); Daphne, Alabama, U.S.
- Listed height: 6 ft 4 in (1.93 m)
- Listed weight: 195 lb (88 kg)

Career information
- High school: IMG Academy
- College: Florida State (2021–2022); Penn State (2023); Arizona State (2024–2025)
- NFL draft: 2026: undrafted

Career history
- New York Jets (2026–present)

Career NFL statistics as of Week 3, 2026
- Games played: 1
- Stats at Pro Football Reference

Malik Isaac McClain (born October 8, 2002) is an American professional football wide receiver for the New York Jets of the National Football League (NFL). He played college football for the Arizona State Sun Devils, the Florida State Seminoles and for the Penn State Nittany Lions.

== Early life ==
McClain grew up in Daphne, Alabama and attended Daphne High School before transferring to IMG Academy located in Bradenton, Florida for his senior season. Coming out of high school, he was rated as a four-star recruit, the 43rd overall receiver, and 267th overall recruit in the class of 2021, where he held offers from schools such as Alabama, Florida State, Miami, Ole Miss, Texas A&M, and Penn State. He initially committed to play college football for the Florida State Seminoles, before de-committing, before eventually re-committing and signing to play for the Seminoles.

== College career ==
=== Florida State ===
In week seven of the 2021 season, he hauled in his first career touchdown reception in a win over North Carolina. McClain finished his freshman season in 2021, appearing in 12 games with nine starts, recording 16 receptions for 190 yards and two touchdowns. In the 2022 season, he logged just three starts, notching 17 receptions for 206 yards and two touchdowns, where after the conclusion of the season, he decided to enter his name into the NCAA transfer portal.

=== Penn State ===
McClain transferred to play for the Penn State Nittany Lions. During the 2023 season, he played in all 13 games, finishing with six catches for 71 yards and one touchdown, where after the conclusion of the year, he once again entered his name into the NCAA transfer portal.

=== Arizona State ===
McClain transferred to play for the Arizona State Sun Devils. In the 2024 Big 12 Championship Game, he hauled in a 43 yard reception in a victory over Iowa State. In the 2025 Peach Bowl, McClain notched a 42 yard touchdown reception on a trick play thrown by running back Cam Skattebo, in a 39-31 loss to Texas. He decided to use the 2024 season to redshirt, after arriving to Arizona State late in the summer.

== Professional career ==
Pre-draft measurables
Height	Weight	Arm length	Hand span	Wingspan	40-yard dash	10-yard split	20-yard split	20-yard shuttle	Three-cone drill	Vertical jump	Broad jump	Bench press
6 ft 4 1/4 in (1.94 m)	205 lb (93 kg)	34 in (0.86 m)	8 3/4 in (0.22 m)	6 ft 8 1/8 in (2.04 m)	4.47 s	1.54 s	2.61 s	4.18 s	6.78 s	40.0 in (1.02 m)	11 ft 4 in (3.45 m)	17 reps
All values from Pro Day

On May 8, 2026, McClain signed with the New York Jets as an undrafted free agent. McClain was waived by the Jets as a part of final roster cuts on August 30; he was re-signed to the team's practice squad the following day. He was promoted to the active roster on September 22.
