= Roman Rashada =

American football player (born 2001)

No. 26
- Position: Defensive back

Personal information
- Born: July 11, 2001 (age 25); Oakley, California, U.S.
- Listed height: 6 ft 1 in (1.85 m)
- Listed weight: 185 lb (84 kg)

Career information
- High school: Inderkum (Sacramento, California)
- College: Diablo Valley (2021); Ole Miss (2022); Arizona State (2023–2024)
- Stats at ESPN

Roman Rashada (born July 11, 2001) is a former American football defensive back. He played for Diablo Valley College, Ole Miss, and Arizona State. He is an older brother to Sacramento State quarterback Jaden Rashada.

== Early life and education ==
Rashada was born in Oakley, California. He attended Freedom High School and Vista Murrieta High School before graduating from Inderkum High School in Sacramento, California. He also attended Laney College in Bay Area, California. He later earned a Bachelor of Arts degree from Arizona State University in 2024.

== Career ==
While still in high School, Rashada was an All-Conference player. He also had a notable football career season while he was still studying at Arizona State University.
