= Pittsburg Unified School District =

School district in California, United States

Location
- 2000 Railroad Ave. Pittsburg, California 94565 United States

Students and staff
- Colors: Orange & Black

Other information
- Website: www.pittsburg.k12.ca.us

Pittsburg Unified School District is a public school district based in Contra Costa County, California, United States.

The district includes the majority of Pittsburg and a small section of Bay Point.

== Schools ==
=== High schools ===
- Black Diamond High School
- Pittsburg High School

=== Junior high schools ===
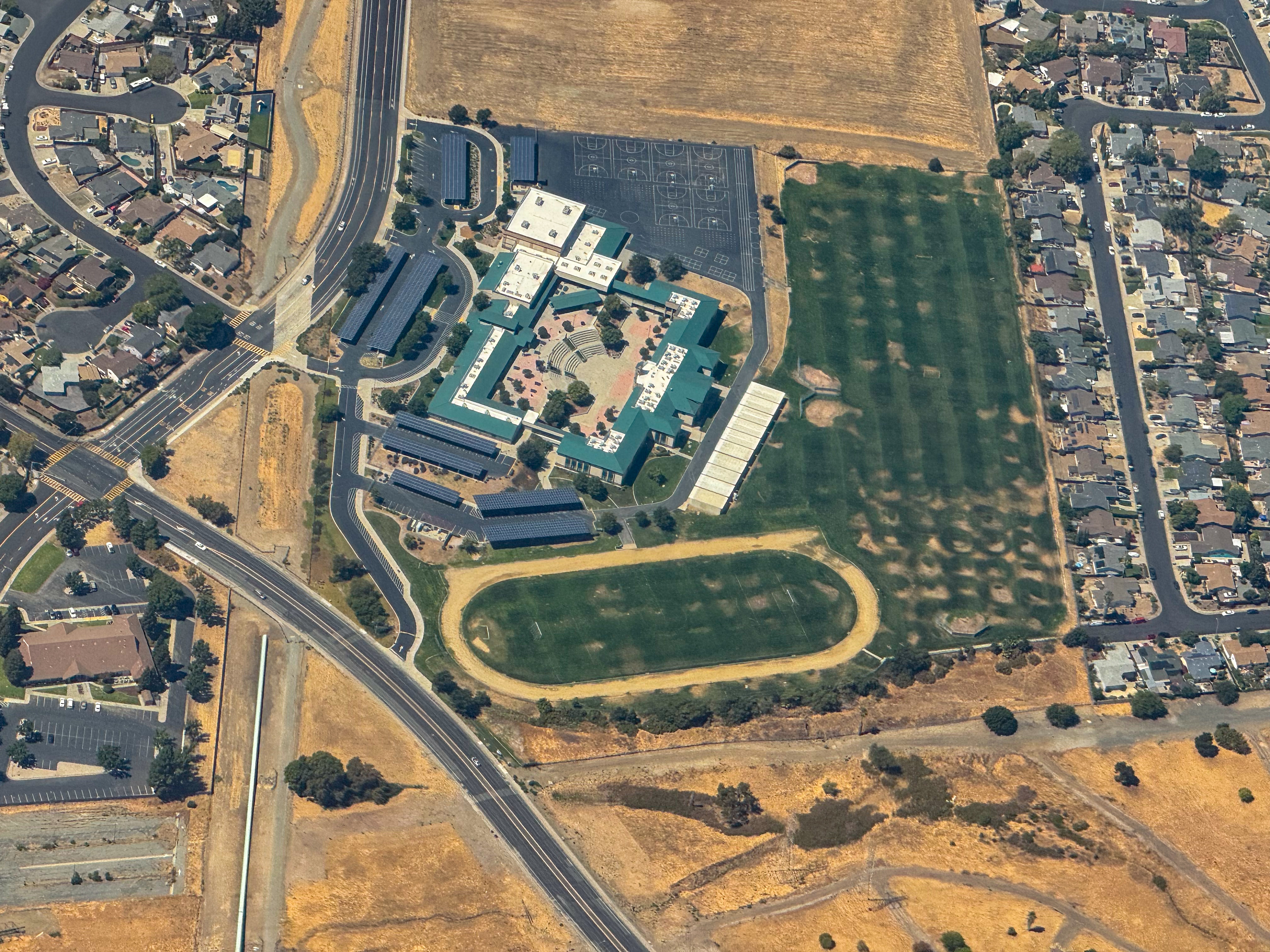
Rancho Medanos Junior High School

- Hillview Junior High School
- Martin Luther King, Jr. Junior High School
- Rancho Medanos Junior High School

=== Elementary schools ===
- Foothill Elementary School
- Heights Elementary School
- Highlands Elementary School
- Los Medanos Elementary School
- Marina Vista Elementary School
- Parkside Elementary School
- Stoneman Elementary School
- Willow Cove Elementary School

=== Adult education ===
- Pittsburg Adult Education Center
