= Troy Omeire =

American football player (born 2002)

No. 0 – New Mexico Lobos
- Position: Wide receiver
- Class: Redshirt Senior

Personal information
- Born: February 4, 2002 (age 24)
- Listed height: 6 ft 5 in (1.96 m)
- Listed weight: 226 lb (103 kg)

Career information
- High school: Stephen F. Austin (Sugar Land, Texas)
- College: Texas (2020–2022); Arizona State (2023–2024); UNLV (2025); New Mexico (2026–present)
- Stats at ESPN

Troy Omeire (born February 4, 2002) is an American college football wide receiver for the New Mexico Lobos. He previously played for the Texas Longhorns, Arizona State Sun Devils and the UNLV Rebels.

== Early life ==
Omeire is from Sugar Land, Texas, and played football at Fort Bend Austin High School. A four‑star prospect out of high school, he was nationally ranked among the top wide receivers by ESPN and Rivals, appearing among the top 30 players in Texas and rated No. 27 overall in the 2020 class by Rivals.

== College career ==
=== Texas ===
Omeire enrolled at Texas in 2020. He missed both his freshman and redshirt freshman seasons (2020 and 2021) due to knee injuries. In 2022, as a redshirt sophomore, he played in four games and made one reception for nine yards.

On November 29, 2022, Omeire announced that he would enter the transfer portal.

=== Arizona State ===
On January 8, 2023, Omeire announced that he would transfer to Arizona State.

During the 2023 season, he caught 20 passes for 223 yards and three touchdowns, tying for the team lead in receiving touchdowns. He averaged over 17 yards per target and was often used in contested catch situations. In 2024, he appeared in 12 games, recording five receptions for 59 yards. Over his two seasons at ASU, he totaled 25 receptions for 282 yards and three touchdowns (average 11.3 yards per catch).

On January 7, 2025, Omeire announced that he would enter the transfer portal for the second time.

=== UNLV ===
On January 10, 2025, Omeire announced that he would transfer to UNLV.

=== Statistics ===
Year	Team	Games		Receiving			
Year	Team	GP	GS	Rec	Yds	Avg	TD
2020	Texas	0	0	Did not play due to injury			
2021	Texas	0	0	Did not play due to injury			
2022	Texas	4	0	1	9	9.0	0
2023	Arizona State	9	6	20	223	11.2	3
2024	Arizona State	12	4	5	59	11.8	0
2025	UNLV	12	6	27	472	17.5	4
2026	New Mexico	0	0	0	0	0.0	0
Career		37	16	53	763	14.4	7
