= Kenny Dillingham =

American football coach (born 1990)

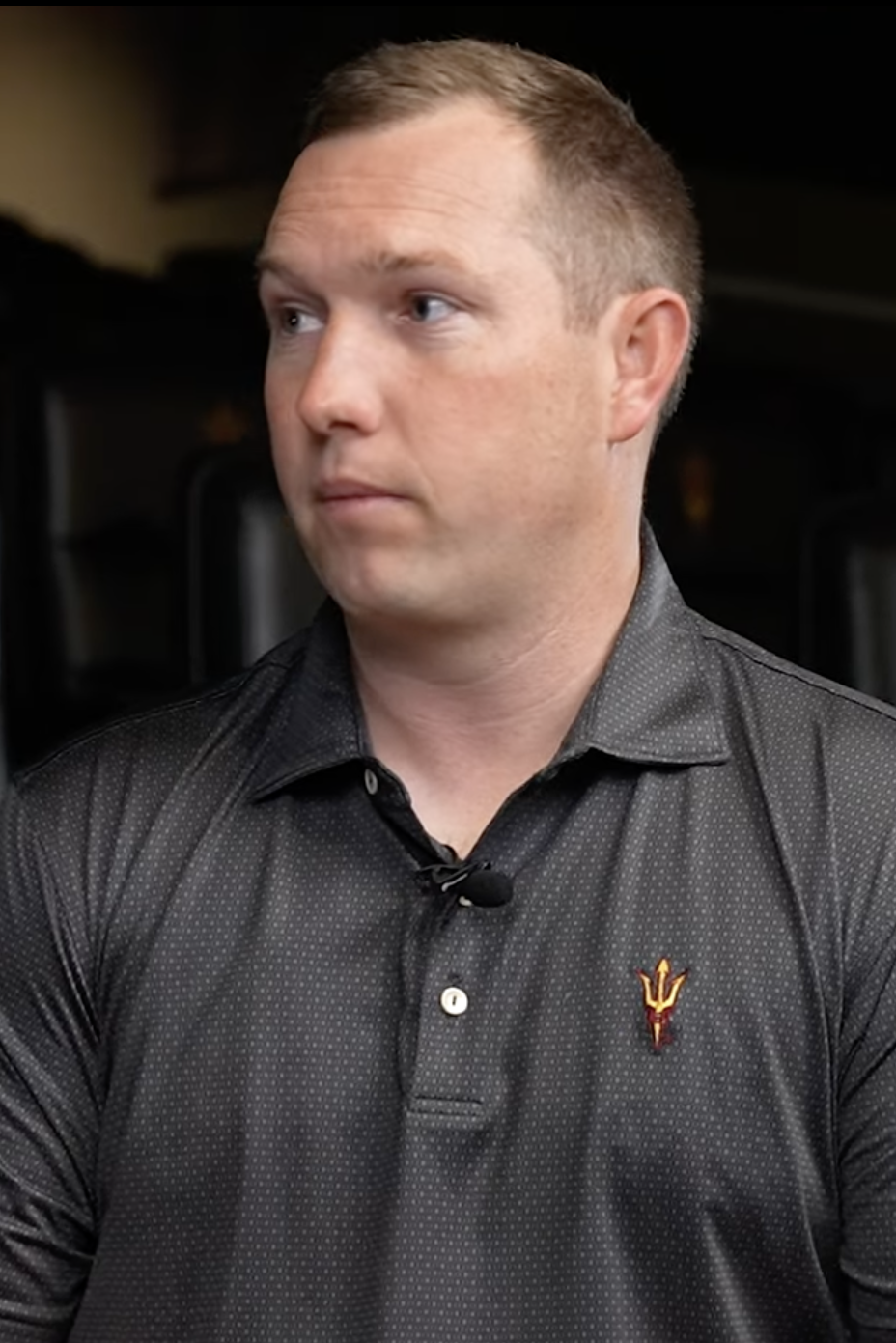
- Dillingham in 2025

Current position
- Title: Head coach
- Team: Arizona State
- Conference: Big 12
- Record: 28–22

Biographical details
- Born: April 28, 1990 (age 36); Phoenix, Arizona, U.S.
- Education: Arizona State (2013)

Coaching career (HC unless noted)
- 2007–2012: Chaparral HS (AZ) (QB)
- 2013: Chaparral HS (AZ) (OC/QB)
- 2014–2015: Arizona State (OA)
- 2016: Memphis (GA)
- 2017: Memphis (QB/TE)
- 2018: Memphis (OC/QB)
- 2019: Auburn (OC/QB)
- 2020–2021: Florida State (OC/QB)
- 2022: Oregon (OC/QB)
- 2023–present: Arizona State

Head coaching record
- Overall: 28–22
- Bowls: 0–2
- Tournaments: 0–1 (CFP)

Accomplishments and honors

Championships
- 1 Big 12 (2024)

Awards
- Big 12 Coach of the Year (2024)

Kenny Dillingham (born April 28, 1990) is an American football coach who is currently the head football coach at Arizona State University. He previously served as the offensive coordinator at the University of Oregon, Florida State University, Auburn University, and the University of Memphis.

== Coaching career ==
=== Early coaching career ===
Dillingham began coaching at age 17 after he tore his ACL during his senior year. He started working with the junior varsity team at Chaparral High School before being promoted to offensive coordinator of the varsity team at 21 years old. While coaching at Chaparral, he went to Arizona State University, graduating in 2013 with a degree in interdisciplinary studies. He was hired as an offensive assistant at Arizona State in 2014 under offensive coordinator Mike Norvell, whom he met while coaching at Chaparral.

=== Memphis ===
After Norvell was hired as coach at Memphis in 2016, Dillingham was hired as a graduate assistant for the Tigers. Dillingham spent the 2016 season as the de facto quarterbacks coach, since the team did not have an official quarterbacks coach. After Tigers offensive coordinator Chip Long left to be the offensive coordinator at Notre Dame, Dillingham was named the official quarterbacks coach for Memphis and added tight ends coach to his duties for 2017. After Long's successor Darrell Dickey left for Texas A&M, Dillingham was promoted to offensive coordinator for the 2018 season. In 2017–2018 Memphis had back-to-back top 5 offenses in college football. While at Memphis, Dillingham was rated the #1 recruiter in the conference by the 24/7 recruiter rankings.

=== Auburn ===
Dillingham was hired by Gus Malzahn to be the offensive coordinator and quarterbacks coach at Auburn in 2019, replacing Chip Lindsey. During his time at Auburn, he helped Bo Nix become the SEC Rookie of the Year while leading the most improved offense in the SEC. He spent one season with the Tigers, where they recorded a 9–3 record while averaging 33.2 points per game. Auburn also had its highest recruiting ranking in the 24/7 recruiting ranking era during Dillingham’s year as offensive coordinator.

=== Florida State ===
After Norvell left Memphis to be the next head coach at Florida State, Dillingham joined Florida State as their offensive coordinator and quarterbacks coach, replacing Kendal Briles.

=== Oregon ===
On December 17, 2021, Dillingham was hired as the offensive coordinator and quarterbacks coach at the University of Oregon under head coach Dan Lanning.

=== Arizona State ===
On November 27, 2022, Dillingham was named the 26th head coach at Arizona State University, replacing Herm Edwards. He is the first Sun Devil alumnus and native Arizonan to hold this position.

In his second season, Dillingham's team was projected to finish last in the Big 12 according to the conference’s preseason media poll. However, they exceeded expectations by winning the Big 12 Championship game, defeating Iowa State and earning a first-round bye in the 2024 College Football Playoff. For this effort, Dillingham was runner-up in AP coach of the year.

On December 20, 2025, Dillingham agreed to a five-year contract extension with Arizona State.

== Personal life ==
Dillingham and his wife, Briana, have two children.

He has wanted to coach Arizona State since he was young as it is his hometown team.

== Head coaching record ==
Year	Team	Overall	Conference	Standing	Bowl/playoffs	Coaches^{#}	AP^{°}
Arizona State Sun Devils (Pac-12 Conference) (2023)
2023	Arizona State	3–9	2–7	T–9th			
Arizona State Sun Devils (Big 12 Conference) (2024–present)
2024	Arizona State	11–3	7–2	T–1st	L Peach^{†}	7	7
2025	Arizona State	8–5	6–3	T–4th	L Sun		
2026	Arizona State	6–5	4–4				
Arizona State:		28–22	19–16				
Total:		28–22					
National championship Conference title Conference division title or championship game berth
