= Pittsburg High School (California) =

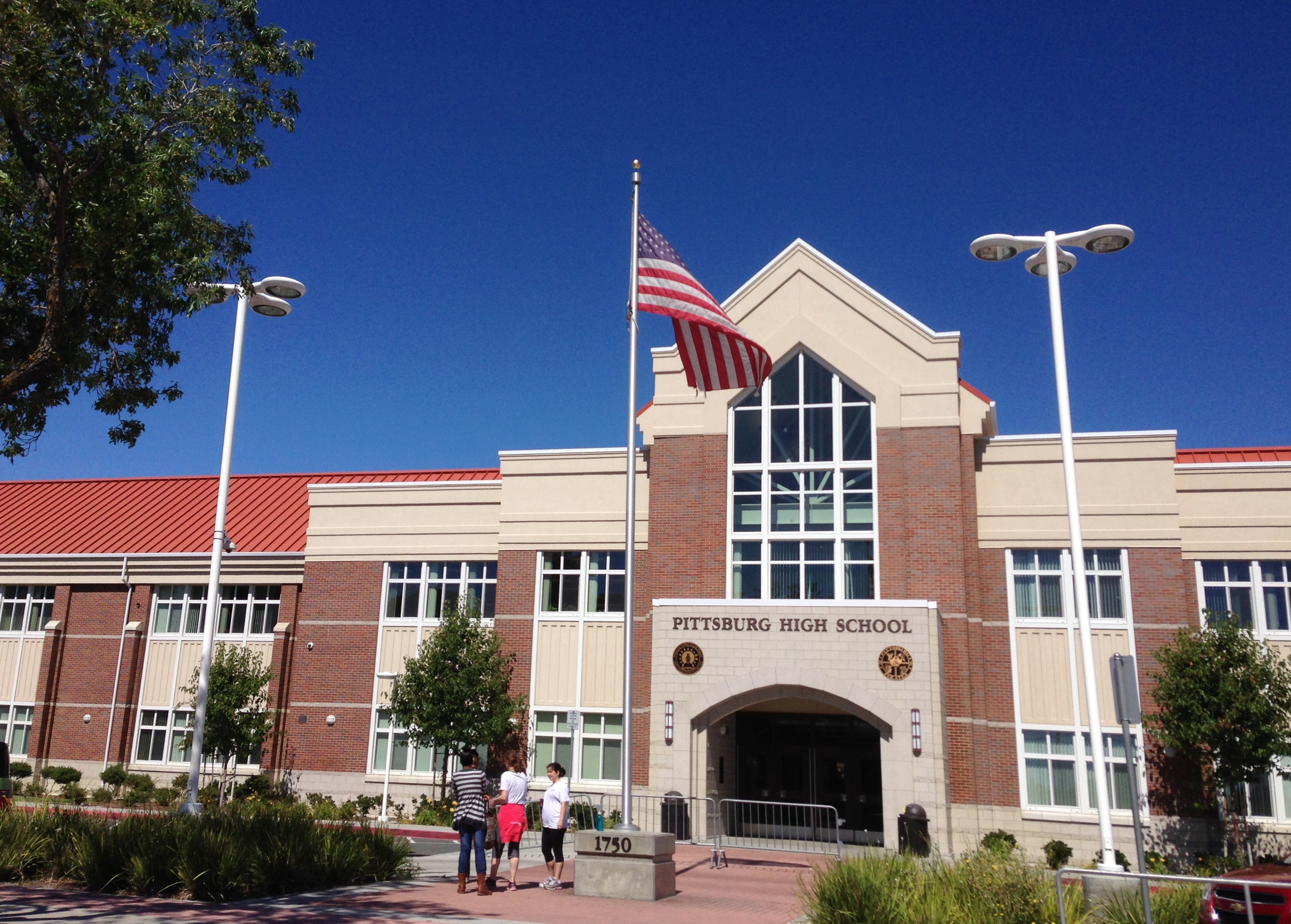

Location
- 1750 Harbor Street; Pittsburg, California 94565; United States; 38.020°N 121.884°W

Information
- School district: Pittsburg Unified School District
- Principal: Reginald Richardson
- Teaching staff: 154.59 FTE
- Grades: 9–12
- Enrollment: 3,532 (2023–2024)
- Student to teacher ratio: 22.85
- Colors: Orange and black
- Mascot: Pirate
- Team name: Pirates
- Website: phs.pittsburgusd.net

Pittsburg High School in Pittsburg, Contra Costa County, California, United States, is a suburban school serving Pittsburg. It has been in operation since 1924. Over 3,000 students attend the school. It is a part of the Pittsburg Unified School District. Pittsburg High School teaches grades 9–12.

== Notable alumni ==
- Lionel Aldridge (1941–1998), NFL defensive end (1963–73) with the Green Bay Packers and San Diego Chargers
- Eddie Hart (born 1949), Olympic gold medalist in 4 × 100 m relay at the 1972 Summer Olympics
- Shaunard Harts (b. 1978), Kansas City Chiefs (2001–04)
- The Jacka (1977–2015), Bay Area hip hop artist
- John Henry Johnson (1929–2011), NFL fullback; Pro Football Hall of Fame 1987; part of "The Million Dollar Backfield"
- Mars (b. 1980), Mexican-American hip hop artist; real name Mario Delgado
- James Page (b. 1971), James "Mighty Quinn" Page, former WBA Welterweight Champion of the World
- Richard Poe (b. 1946), actor
- Jaden Rashada (b. 2003), football player
- Ken Simonton (b. 1979), NFL running back (2002–05)
- Joe Tafoya (b. 1978), Chicago Bears (2001–03), Seattle Seahawks (2005–06), Arizona Cardinals (2007)
- Altie Taylor (1947–2010), NFL running back; drafted by the Detroit Lions in the second round (34th overall) of the 1969 NFL Draft
- Regan Upshaw (b. 1975), NFL defensive tackle (1996–2004), drafted by the Tampa Bay Buccaneers in the first round (12th overall) of the 1996 NFL Draft
