= Jaden Rashada =

American football player (born 2003)

No. 8 – Mississippi State Bulldogs
- Position: Quarterback
- Class: (redshirt) Junior

Personal information
- Born: August 31, 2003 (age 23)
- Listed height: 6 ft 4 in (1.93 m)
- Listed weight: 185 lb (84 kg)

Career information
- High school: Pittsburg (Pittsburg, California)
- College: Arizona State (2023); Georgia (2024); Sacramento State (2025); Mississippi State (2026–present)
- Stats at ESPN

Jaden Rashada (born August 31, 2003) is an American college football quarterback for the Mississippi State Bulldogs. He previously played for the Arizona State Sun Devils, Georgia Bulldogs, and Sacramento State Hornets.

== Early life ==
Rashada initially attended Liberty High School in Brentwood, California before transferring to IMG Academy in Bradenton, Florida after his freshman year. He spent the summer at IMG, but moved back to California before the start of the football season and enrolled at Pittsburg High School. As a junior, he passed for more than 2,220 yards with 27 touchdown passes. Rashada passed for 3,055 yards and 32 touchdowns as a senior. He is believed to have been the first high school football player to sign an endorsement deal after reaching an agreement with a recruitment app in December 2021.

=== Recruitment ===
Rashada initially committed to play college football at Miami over offers from LSU, Florida, Mississippi, and Texas A&M. It was reported that Rashada received a Name, Image and Likeness (NIL) offer of up to $9.5 million after his commitment to Miami. He later denied that any deal had been offered to him.

He later flipped his commitment to Florida. Shortly before he was set to enroll for Florida's 2023 spring semester, Rashada requested a release from his National Letter of Intent. It was later reported that a $13.85 million NIL deal with the Gator Collective, an athletic booster group that is unaffiliated with Florida's athletic program, had fallen through. Rashada ultimately enrolled at Arizona State, where his father had played. On May 21, 2024, it was announced that Rashada was suing Florida coach Billy Napier and Gators booster Hugh Hathcock over the failed deal.

== College career ==
=== Arizona State ===
Rashada joined the Arizona State Sun Devils as an early enrollee in January 2023. He was named ASU's starting quarterback prior to the team's season opener against Southern Utah. Rashada passed for 236 yards and two touchdowns in a 24-21 win in his collegiate debut.

=== Georgia ===
Rashada transferred to Georgia on April 25, 2024. It was reported on January 5, 2025 that he was entering the transfer portal and leaving Georgia. He did not appear in a game for the Bulldogs.

=== Sacramento State ===
Rashada transferred to Sacramento State on April 25, 2025.

He started the season opener on August 30, 2025, going 11-for-27 for 112 yards and an interception in a 20-3 loss to South Dakota State. He started again the following week at Nevada, but left after injuring his thumb early in a 20-17 defeat, limiting his availability the rest of the season. Rashada appeared in six games in total for the Hornets, including the two early-season starts.

Rashada announced his entry into the transfer portal on January 3, 2026.

=== Mississippi State ===
On January 22, 2026, Rashada announced that he would be transferring to play for the Mississippi State Bulldogs.

=== Lawsuit ===
On May 21, 2024, Rashada filed a lawsuit in the U.S. District Court in the Northern District of Florida accusing University of Florida head football coach William “Billy” Napier and others of fraud and failing to pay a purportedly promised $13.85 million name, image and likeness (NIL) agreement. The lawsuit alleged that $13.85 million, funded by “[Hugh] Hathcock’s Gator Guard collective” was promised to Rashada on December 7, 2022. The Gators’ backers also arranged a payment to Rashada to help pay off money owed to University of Miami booster John Ruiz after the quarterback flipped his verbal commitment from the Hurricanes, per the suit.

According to Rashada and his attorney Rusty Hardin, Napier promised the-then-high school senior that Florida alumni “were good on their promise that Jaden would receive $1 million if he signed with UF on National Signing Day. Rashada claims the only funds received from Hathcock totaled $150,000.00 to repay the University of Miami booster. Less than a month later after early signing day, Rashada asked for his release from his letter of intent with Florida. The lawsuit claims that Rashada suffered the loss of his $9.5 million NIL deal with Miami and other collective-sponsored NIL compensation. It also seeks punitive damages. As of May 24, 2024, the litigation remains on-going.

Rashada is the first known college athlete to sue his coach or a booster due to a dispute of a name, image and likeness (NIL) deal.

=== College stats ===
Season	Team	Games			Passing								Rushing			
Season	Team	GP	GS	Record	Cmp	Att	Pct	Yds	Avg	TD	Int	Rtg	Att	Yds	Avg	TD
2023	Arizona State	3	2	1−1	44	82	53.7	485	5.9	4	3	112.1	14	23	1.6	0
2024	Georgia	0	0	—	DNP											
2025	Sacramento State	6	2	0−2	17	42	40.5	269	6.4	1	1	97.4	10	-4	-0.4	0
Career		9	4	1−3	61	124	49.2	754	6.1	5	4	107.1	24	19	0.8	0
