= Xavier Guillory =

American football player (born 2001)

No. 88 – Cleveland Browns
- Position: Wide receiver
- Roster status: Practice squad

Personal information
- Born: July 13, 2001 (age 25); Lewiston, Idaho, U.S.
- Listed height: 6 ft 2 in (1.88 m)
- Listed weight: 210 lb (95 kg)

Career information
- High school: Lewis and Clark (Spokane, Washington)
- College: Idaho State (2020–2022); Arizona State (2023–2024)
- NFL draft: 2025: undrafted

Career history
- Baltimore Ravens (2025–2026)*; Cleveland Browns (2026–present)*
- * Offseason or practice squad member only
- Stats at Pro Football Reference

Xavier Guillory (born July 13, 2001) is an American professional football wide receiver for the Cleveland Browns of the National Football League (NFL). He played college football for the Idaho State Bengals and Arizona State Sun Devils.

== Early life ==
Guillory attended Lewis and Clark High School in Spokane, Washington. As a senior, he hauled in 45 passes for 725 yards and 11 touchdowns. Coming out of high school, Guillory was rated as a three-star recruit and the 2,338th overall recruit in the 2020 class, where he committed to play college football for the Idaho State Bengals.

== College career ==
=== Idaho State ===
As a freshman in 2020, Guillory tallied 21 catches for 264 yards and one touchdown. In 2021, he recorded 20 receptions for 259 yards and one touchdown. During the 2022 season, Guillory notched 52 receptions for 785 yards and four touchdowns in ten games. After the conclusion of the 2022 season, he decided to enter his name into the NCAA transfer portal.

=== Arizona State ===
Guillory transferred to play for the Arizona State Sun Devils. In the 2023 season opener, he hauled in a 47-yard touchdown in a win over Southern Utah. In his first season as a Sun Devil in 2023, Guillory tallied 21 catches for 226 yards and one touchdown. In the 2024 Big 12 Championship Game, he hauled in two touchdowns, as he helped the Sun Devils clinch a spot in the College Football Playoffs with a win over Iowa State. During the 2024 season, Guillory hauled in 22 passes for 339 yards and five touchdowns.

== Professional career ==
Pre-draft measurables
Height	Weight	Arm length	Hand span	Wingspan	40-yard dash	10-yard split	20-yard split	20-yard shuttle	Three-cone drill	Vertical jump	Broad jump	Bench press
6 ft 1 7/8 in (1.88 m)	201 lb (91 kg)	30 5/8 in (0.78 m)	8 1/2 in (0.22 m)	6 ft 2 1/2 in (1.89 m)	4.58 s	1.55 s	2.59 s	4.34 s	6.91 s	39.0 in (0.99 m)	10 ft 8 in (3.25 m)	15 reps
All values from Pro Day

=== Baltimore Ravens ===
Guillory signed with the Baltimore Ravens as an undrafted free agent on May 4, 2025. He was waived by the Ravens on August 26, as part of final roster cuts.

On April 20, 2026, Guillory re-signed with the Ravens. On August 30, Guillory was waived by Baltimore as a part of final roster cuts; he was re-signed to the team's practice squad the next day. He was released on October 13.

=== Cleveland Browns ===
On November 3, 2026, Guillory was signed to the Cleveland Browns practice squad.

== Personal life ==
Guillory was born in Lewiston, Idaho, as one of five children. Both of Guillory's are citizens of the Nez Perce Tribe of Idaho, while his father is half-Black, half-Nez Perce.

On October 28, 2022, Guillory was arrested by Pocatello police at 11:13 p.m. on a DUI.
