= Cam Skattebo =

American football player (born 2002)

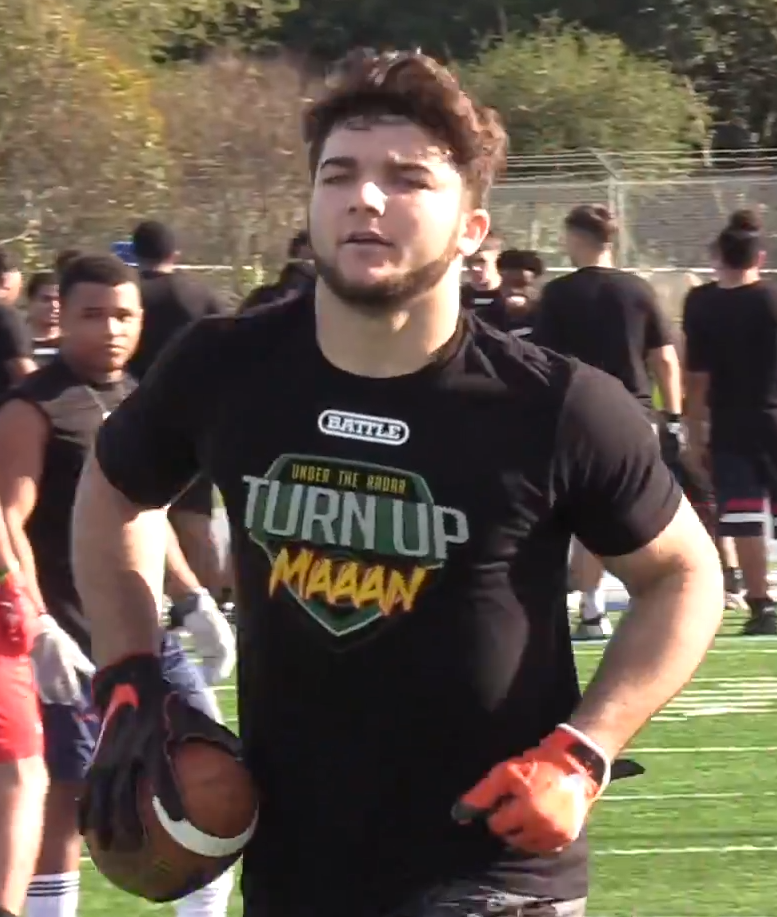
- Skattebo in 2019

No. 44 – New York Giants
- Position: Running back
- Roster status: Active

Personal information
- Born: February 5, 2002 (age 24); Rio Linda, California, U.S.
- Listed height: 5 ft 9 in (1.75 m)
- Listed weight: 215 lb (98 kg)

Career information
- High school: Rio Linda
- College: Sacramento State (2020–2022); Arizona State (2023–2024)
- NFL draft: 2025: 4th round, 105th overall pick

Career history
- New York Giants (2025–present)

Awards and highlights
- First-team All-American (2024); First-team All-Big 12 (2024); Big Sky Offensive Player of the Year (2022); First-team All-Big Sky (2022)

Career NFL statistics as of Week 10, 2026
- Rushing yards: 906
- Rushing average: 4.2
- Rushing touchdowns: 9
- Receptions: 38
- Receiving yards: 327
- Receiving touchdowns: 2
- Stats at Pro Football Reference

Cam Skattebo (/ˈskætəbuː/ SKAT-ə-boo; born February 5, 2002) is an American professional football running back for the New York Giants of the National Football League (NFL). He played college football for the Sacramento State Hornets and Arizona State Sun Devils. Skattebo was selected by the Giants in the fourth round of the 2025 NFL draft.

== Early life ==
Skattebo attended Rio Linda High School in Rio Linda, California. As a junior, he rushed for 3,550 yards and 42 touchdowns, helping his team to the state championship. Skattebo committed to play college football for the Sacramento State Hornets, the only Division I program to offer him a scholarship.

== College career ==
=== Sacramento State ===
As a freshman in 2021, Skattebo rushed for 520 yards and six touchdowns on 57 carries, earning third-team all-Big Sky honors. In 2022, Skattebo rushed for 1,382 yards and seven touchdowns, while also throwing for a touchdown, and returning an onside kick for a touchdown, the last five yards of which he ran backwards while being tackled by four opponents. As a result, he was named first-team all-Big Sky, Big Sky offensive player of the year, and an FCS All-American. After the season, Skattebo entered the NCAA transfer portal.

=== Arizona State ===
Skattebo transferred to play for the Arizona State Sun Devils. In week 4 of the 2023 season versus USC, he rushed for 111 yards and a touchdown, accumulated 79 receiving yards, and completed two of three passing attempts for 42 yards, including a touchdown. Skattebo finished the season with 783 rushing yards for 9 touchdowns and 286 receiving yards for a receiving touchdown. Noted for his versatility, he also completed six passes for 130 yards and a passing touchdown, and made 8 punts for 338 yards.

In 2024, in a week 2 win versus Mississippi State, he rushed for 262 yards, including a 39-yard rush that sealed the win. He was named the AP National Player of the Week, the Big 12 Offensive Player of the Week, and the Doak Walker Running Back of the Week. In the 2025 Peach Bowl against Texas, Skattebo racked up 284 total yards (143 rushing, 99 receiving, 42 passing), two rushing touchdowns, a two-point conversion and a passing touchdown, while setting the ASU single-season record for touchdowns from scrimmage. Despite the loss, he was named the Peach Bowl’s Offensive MVP, which was the first time the MVP was awarded to a member of the losing team in 26 years.

Skattebo finished his senior season with 293 carries for 1,711 yards and 21 touchdowns, and 45 receptions for 605 yards and three touchdowns. Skattebo broke the Arizona State record for total rushing yards in a season, became the first ASU player to cross 2,000 yards from scrimmage in a single season, and finished 5th in Heisman voting. His rushing yards were second-most in the FBS, only behind Heisman runner-up Ashton Jeanty.

=== Statistics ===
Season	Team	Games		Rushing				Receiving			
Season	Team	GP	GS	Att	Yds	Avg	TD	Rec	Yds	Avg	TD
2020	Sacramento State	No team – COVID-19 pandemic									
2021	Sacramento State	11	4	57	520	9.1	6	12	124	10.3	1
2022	Sacramento State	13	12	195	1,372	7.0	7	31	371	12.0	3
2023	Arizona State	12	7	164	783	4.8	9	24	286	11.9	1
2024	Arizona State	13	13	293	1,711	5.8	21	45	605	13.4	3
Career		49	36	709	4,386	6.2	43	112	1,386	12.4	8

== Professional career ==
Pre-draft measurables
Height	Weight	Arm length	Hand span	Wingspan	40-yard dash	10-yard split	20-yard split	Vertical jump	Broad jump	Bench press
5 ft 9 1/2 in (1.77 m)	219 lb (99 kg)	29 7/8 in (0.76 m)	9 3/8 in (0.24 m)	6 ft 1 7/8 in (1.88 m)	4.65 s	1.58 s	2.67 s	39.5 in (1.00 m)	10 ft 3 in (3.12 m)	17 reps
All values from NFL Combine/Pro Day

Skattebo was selected in the fourth round, with the 105th overall selection, by the New York Giants in the 2025 NFL draft. He signed his rookie contract on June 18, 2025.

=== 2025 ===
Skattebo made his NFL debut in Week 1 against the Washington Commanders. He recorded his first career touchdown against the Dallas Cowboys in Week 2, accompanied with 45 rushing yards on 11 carries in the overtime loss. In Week 6 of his rookie season against the division rival Philadelphia Eagles on Thursday Night Football, Skattebo had the first multiple touchdown game of his career, where he ran for three touchdowns en route to a 34-17 victory, becoming the second Giants rookie running back since Charlie Evans in 1971 to rush for three touchdowns in a game. In Skattebo's first eight games, he recorded 410 yards on 101 rushing attempts with five touchdowns, while also catching 24 passes for 207 yards and two touchdowns.

On October 26, 2025, he left the Giants' Week 8 rematch against the Philadelphia Eagles after suffering an ankle injury in the second quarter of the 38–20 loss. He was diagnosed with a dislocated ankle immediately following the game, and subsequently ruled out for the remainder of the season. It was reported that he was a visitor to the Outer Banks in July 2026 and was seen doing a backflip on the beach.

=== 2026 ===
Skattebo would make his return on September 13, 2026, in a Sunday Night Primetime win over division rival Dallas Cowboys at MetLife Stadium where he rushed for 81 yards and 1 rushing touchdown.

On October 25, 2026, Skattebo recorded his first 100 yard rushing game in the NFL, running for 124 yards on 17 carries including a touchdown in an overtime win against the Houston Texans at Reliant Stadium.

== Playing style ==
His playing style has been widely touted for his aggressive running. He has often been seen as having the running style of a traditional fullback for his ability to run downhill and block, being compared to other physical runners and fullbacks of the past such as Toby Gerhart, Mike Alstott, and Peyton Hillis.

== NFL career statistics ==
Legend
**Bold**	Career high

=== Regular season ===
Year	Team	Games		Rushing					Receiving					Kickoff return					Fumbles	
Year	Team	GP	GS	Att	Yds	Avg	Lng	TD	Rec	Yds	Avg	Lng	TD	Ret	Yds	Avg	Lng	TD	Fum	Lost
2025	NYG	8	5	101	410	4.1	24	**5**	**24**	**207**	**8.6**	21	**2**	0	0	0.0	0	0	1	**1**
2026	NYG	8	7	**116**	**496**	**4.3**	**42**	4	14	120	8.6	**34**	0	0	0	0.0	0	0	**4**	0
Career		16	12	217	906	4.2	42	9	38	327	8.6	34	2	0	0	0.0	0	0	5	1

== Personal life ==
Skattebo has three siblings; a brother and two sisters. His brother, Leonard, played for Bowling Green as a fullback in 2017.

He is a fan of the WWE, and grew up watching it with his late grandfather. He gained the nickname "Nature Boy" when he was in high school in homage to 16-time world wrestling champion Ric "Nature Boy" Flair, whom Skattebo is a fan of. On November 17, 2025, Skattebo, along with fellow rookie Abdul Carter, Roy Robertson-Harris, and comedian/actor Andrew Schulz were involved in a staged scuffle between The Judgment Day members JD McDonagh, Dominik Mysterio, Finn Bálor, and others on Monday Night Raw.

Skattebo is of Norwegian and Portuguese descent, and Mexican descent through his maternal grandmother.

Skattebo is well known for his brother-like relationship with New York Giants quarterback Jaxson Dart.
