= Kyson Brown =

American football player (born 2005)

No. 1 – Arizona State Sun Devils
- Position: Running back
- Class: Junior

Personal information
- Born: March 22, 2005 (age 21)
- Listed height: 6 ft 1 in (1.85 m)
- Listed weight: 205 lb (93 kg)

Career information
- High school: Lancaster (Lancaster, Texas)
- College: Arizona State (2023–present)
- Stats at ESPN

Kyson Brown (born March 22, 2005) is an American college football running back for the Arizona State Sun Devils.

== Early life ==
Brown attended high school at Lancaster in Lancaster, Texas. Coming out of high school, he committed to play college football for the Arizona State Sun Devils.

== College career ==
During his freshman season in 2023, he ran for 106 yards on 23 carries, while also recording nine receptions for 49 yards. In week one of the 2024 season, Brown hauled in a pass which he took 73 yards for a touchdown against Wyoming. In week ten, he ran 15 times for 62 yards and two touchdowns in a win over Oklahoma State. In the 2024 regular season finale, Brown rushed for 100 yards on seven carries in a victory over rival Arizona. He finished the 2024 season, rushing for 351 yards and two touchdowns on 73 carries, while also hauling in 13 passes for 189 yards and a touchdown.
