= 2021 Incarnate Word Cardinals football team =

American college football season

2021 Incarnate Word Cardinals football

Southland champion

NCAA Division I Second Round, L 42–49, vs. Sam Houston
- Conference: Southland Conference

Ranking
- STATS: No. 12
- FCS Coaches: No. 13
- Record: 10–3 (7–1 Southland)
- Head coach: Eric Morris (4th season)
- Offensive coordinator: Cody Crill (4th season)
- Offensive scheme: Air raid
- Defensive coordinator: Justin Deason (4th season)
- Base defense: Multiple
- Home stadium: Gayle and Tom Benson Stadium

2021 Southland Conference football standings
	Conf.			Overall
Team	W		L	W		L
No. 12 Incarnate Word $^	7	–	1	10	–	3
No. 15 Southeastern Louisiana ^	6	–	2	9	–	4
Nicholls	5	–	3	6	–	5
McNeese State *	3	–	5	4	–	7
Northwestern State	3	–	5	3	–	8
Houston Baptist	0	–	8	0	–	11
$ – Conference champion; ^ – FCS playoff participant; * – Ineligible for FCS postseason play due to NCAA sanctions; Rankings from STATS Poll

The 2021 Incarnate Word Cardinals football team represented the University of the Incarnate Word (UIW) in the 2021 NCAA Division I FCS football season as a member of the Southland Conference. The Cardinals played their home games at Gayle and Tom Benson Stadium in San Antonio, Texas. They were led by fourth-year head coach Eric Morris.

On November 12, 2021, Incarnate Word announced that this will be the last season for the team in the Southland and will then join the Western Athletic Conference on July 1, 2022. However, UIW announced they would remain in the Southland in late June and would not join the WAC.

== Preseason ==
=== Preseason poll ===
The Southland Conference released their preseason poll in July 2021. The Cardinals were picked to finish third in the conference. In addition, fifteen Cardinals were chosen to the Preseason All-Southland Team.

=== Preseason All–Southland Teams ===
Offense

1st Team

- Kevin Brown – Running Back, SR
- Robert Ferrel – Wide Receiver, SR

2nd Team

- Cam Ward – Quarterback, SO
- Caleb Johnson – Offensive Lineman, SR
- Nash Jones – Offensive Lineman, SO
- Reid Francis – Offensive Lineman, RS-FR
- Carson Mohr – Kicker, JR

Defense

1st Team

- Cameron Preston – Defensive Lineman, SR
- Kelechi Anyalebechi – Linebacker, SR
- Ce'Cori Tolds – Kick Returner, SR
- Robert Ferrel – Punt Returner, SR

2nd Team

- Blaine Hoover – Defensive Lineman, RS-SR
- Isaiah Paul – Linebacker, RS-SO
- Shawn Holton – Defensive Back, JR
- Elliott Davison – Defensive Back, SO

== Schedule ==
Date	Time	Opponent	Rank	Site	TV	Result	Attendance
September 2	6:00 p.m.	at Youngstown State*		Stambaugh Stadium; Youngstown, OH	ESPN+	L 41–44 ^{OT}	8,637
September 11	7:00 p.m.	Prairie View A&M*		Gayle and Tom Benson Stadium; San Antonio, TX	ESPN+	W 40–9	2,517
September 18	6:00 p.m.	at Texas State*		Bobcat Stadium; San Marcos, TX	ESPN3	W 42–34	16,107
September 25	11:00 a.m.	McNeese State		Gayle and Tom Benson Stadium; San Antonio, TX	ESPN+	W 31–0	1,633
October 2	6:00 p.m.	at Northwestern State	No. 24	Harry Turpin Stadium; Natchitoches, LA	ESPN+	W 38–27	6,125
October 16	11:00 a.m.	Nicholls	No. 18	Gayle and Tom Benson Stadium; San Antonio, TX	ESPN+	W 38–21	1,369
October 23	12:00 p.m.	at McNeese State	No. 16	Cowboy Stadium; Lake Charles, LA	ESPN+	L 20–28	7,498
October 30	3:00 p.m.	Houston Baptist^{†}	No. 22	Gayle and Tom Benson Stadium; San Antonio, TX	ESPN+	W 49–21	2,711
November 6	2:00 p.m.	No. 6 Southeastern Louisiana	No. 22	Gayle and Tom Benson Stadium; San Antonio, TX	ESPN+	W 55–52	3,220
November 13	3:00 p.m.	at Nicholls	No. 17	Manning Field at John L. Guidry Stadium; Thibodaux, LA	ESPN+	W 27–23	6,392
November 20	2:00 p.m.	at Houston Baptist	No. 18	Husky Stadium; Houston, TX	ESPN+	W 55–14	1,931
November 27	2:00 p.m.	No. 20 Stephen F. Austin*	No. 13	Gayle and Tom Benson Stadium; San Antonio, TX (NCAA Division I First Round)	ESPN+	W 35–28 ^{OT}	3,448
December 4	2:00 p.m.	at No. 1 Sam Houston*	No. 13	Bowers Stadium; Huntsville, TX (NCAA Division I Second Round)	ESPN+	L 42–49	6,722
*Non-conference game; ^{†}Homecoming; Rankings from STATS Poll released prior to the game; All times are in Central time

== Personnel ==
=== Coaching staff ===
Name	Position	Alma mater	Joined staff
Eric Morris	Head coach	Texas Tech (2008)	2018
Jordan Davis	Assistant Head Coach / Wide Receivers	Texas Tech (2014)	2018
Justin Deason	Defensive Coordinator	Central Oklahoma (2003)	2018
Cody Crill	Offensive Coordinator	Angelo State (2002)	2018
Brandon Lechtenberg	Linebackers / Special Teams Coordinator	Nebraska	2018
Clint Killough	Inside Receivers / Academic Coordinator	Incarnate Word (2015)	2018
Darren Garrigan	Defensive Backs / Pass Game Coordinator	West Texas A&M (2009)	2018
Matthew Gregg	Outside Linebackers	Southern Nazarene	2019
Mack Leftwich	Quarterbacks	UTEP (2017)	2018
Jordan Shoemaker	Offensive Line / Run Game Coordinator	Houston (2011)	2018
Brett Watson	Interior Defensive Line / Academic Coordinator	West Texas A&M (2009)	2018
Scotty Yates	Quality Control / Defensive Backs	Texas A&M University–Commerce (2015)	2019
Sean Brophy	Quality Control / Quarterbacks	Incarnate Word (2019)	2021
Rolando Surita III	Chief of Staff		2020
Bret Huth	Director of Strength and Conditioning	John Carroll (2010)	2018
Jimmy Fowler	Director of Football Operations		2021

=== Roster ===
2021 Incarnate Word Cardinals football
Quarterback: 7 Cam Ward (C) – sophomore (6'3, 220); 8 Kevin Yeager – junior (6'1, 195); 9 Kannon Williams – freshman (6'2, 220); Running back: 4 Kevin Brown – (redshirt) senior (5'9, 205); 5 Marcus Cooper – (redshirt) senior (5'8, 185); 22 Jarrell Wiley – freshman (5'10, 190); 26 Kaleb Ducros – junior (5'11, 190); 38 Tyrese Brown – sophomore (5'10, 185); Wide receiver: 0 Darion Chafin – senior (6'2, 195); 1 Ce'Cori Tolds – senior (5'10, 155); 2 CJ Hardy – junior (5'11, 195); 6 Jayden Jones – sophomore (6'2, 200); 10 Kailan Noseff – senior (6'3, 195); 11 Jaelin Campbell – senior (6'1, 195); 12 Robert Ferrel – senior (5'9, 170); 13 Marquez Perez – (redshirt) sophomore (5'11, 190); 14 Emerson Haywood – sophomore (6'1, 165); 16 Taylor Grimes – junior (5'11, 190); 19 Baron Bradley – sophomore (6'1, 195); 80 Devin Morrison – junior (6'1, 205); 83 Trevor Begue – (redshirt) senior (5'11, 195); 84 Jalen Smothers – sophomore (5'10, 190); 86 Stayton Ankrom – freshman (6'2, 205); 88 Liam Capobianco – junior (6'3, 180); 89 Marcus Harmon – junior (5'10, 170); Tight end: 3 Roger McCuller – (redshirt) senior (6'1, 210); 40 Coby Walker – sophomore (6'2, 255); 44 Brandon Zapata – junior (5'11, 210); 81 Parker Floyd – junior (6'4, 240); 85 Christian Smith – freshman (6'4, 220)	Offensive line: 55 Aaron Martinez – sophomore (6'2, 295); 61 Jimeto Obigbo – freshman (6'4, 325); 62 Dawson Kier (C) – (redshirt) senior (6'3, 285); 63 Stanley Mark – junior (6'3, 285); 64 Dorion Strawn – freshman (6'5, 320); 65 Dayton Robinson – freshman (6'5, 325); 68 Jhase Edwards – junior (6'3, 290); 70 Cesar Moreno – (redshirt) senior (6'3, 310); 72 Reid Francis – junior (6'4, 300); 73 Jeremiah Williams – senior (6'1, 295); 74 Caleb Johnson – senior (6'6, 330); 75 Michael Vargas – sophomore (6'5, 295); 76 Nash Jones – sophomore (6'3, 300); 77 Jayden Borjas – junior (6'5, 300); 78 Uzoma Okere – (redshirt) senior (6'2, 290); 79 Joseph Kimmey – junior (6'6, 310); Defensive line: 10 Terrell Lucas – DL – (redshirt) senior (6'3, 250); 11 Blaine Hoover – DE – (redshirt) senior (6'5, 265); 14 Brandon Bowen – DL – (redshirt) senior (6'4, 275); 41 Darius Richmond – DT – junior (6'2, 270); 43 Mason Meyer – DE – junior (6'3, 270); 45 Jared Soyring – DT – senior (6'2, 290); 47 Seth Jaquess – DE – junior (6'4, 250); 90 Sam Latham – DE – junior (6'4, 265); 92 Darien Townsend – DE – (redshirt) senior (6'3, 260); 93 Cameron Preston (C) – DT – senior (6'1, 325); 96 Josh Gonzalez – DL – freshman (6'3, 305); 97 Josh Jackson – DT – senior (6'0, 310); 99 Royce Wellington – DT – senior (6'1, 330); Kicker: 37 John Scifers – sophomore (6'0, 180); 50 Carson Mohr – junior (5'8, 150); Punter: 30 Keven Nguyen – senior (5'10, 185)	Linebacker: 8 Kelechi Anyalebechi (C) – senior (6'0, 240); 9 Gerald Bowie III (C) – senior (6'1, 235); 21 Isaiah Paul – (redshirt) sophomore (6'2, 235); 27 Akil Jones – (redshirt) senior (6'0, 240); 32 Darius Sanders – freshman (6'2, 205); 33 Tylan George – sophomore (5'10, 215); 42 Tah Mac Bright – sophomore (6'2, 225); 46 Ricky Rich – junior (6'1, 210); 52 Gage Maples – freshman (6'0, 220); Defensive back: 2 Micahh Smith – DB – (redshirt) senior (6'0, 205); 4 Kylan Thomas – DB – sophomore (5'11, 195); 5 Tiji Paul – CB – junior (5'10, 195); 6 Shawn Holton – S – junior (5'10, 165); 7 Rashon Davis – DB – (redshirt) senior (6'0, 175); 13 Tre Richardson – CB – junior (6'1, 175); 16 Dante Heaggans – ATH – junior (6'0, 185); 17 Brandon Richard – CB – junior (5'11, 185); 18 Reese Watson – DB – junior (6'0, 185); 19 Reggie Branch – DB – freshman (6'1, 185); 20 Kaleb Culp – DB – sophomore (5'10, 185); 23 Moses Reynolds – DB – (redshirt) senior (6'2, 190); 24 Elliott Davison – DB – sophomore (6'0, 180); 25 Donovan Dreighton – S – freshman (6'2, 200); 28 Jalen Mann – DB – freshman (6'1, 180); 29 Brian Mayes – DB – freshman (6'1, 180); 31 Christian Jackson – DB – freshman (6'0, 180); 34 Rayden Campbell – DB – freshman (5'11, 180); Long snapper: 35 Chance Trentman–Rosas – junior (6'2, 215); 56 Joe Giordano – (redshirt) senior (5'11, 225); Legend: (C) Team captain; (S) Suspended; (I) Ineligible; Injured; Redshirt

== Depth chart ==
Defense

STAR
17 Brandon Richard, Jr
32 Darius Sanders, Fr

FS
20 Kaleb Culp, So
18 Reese Watson, Jr

MO	MIKE
21 Isaiah Paul -or- 27 Akil Jones, R-Sr	8 Kelechi Anyalebechi, Sr
33 Tylan George, So	21 Isaiah Paul, R-So

SS
24 Elliot Davison, So
15 Shawn Holton, Jr

CB
7 Rashon Davis, R-Sr
5 Tiji Paul, Jr

DE	DT	DT	DE
14 Brandon Bowen, R-Sr	93 Cameron Preston, Sr	45 Jared Soyring, Sr	10 Terrell Lucas, R-Sr
90 Sam Latham, Jr	99 Royce Wellington, Sr	41 Darius Richmond, Jr	11 Blaine Hoover, Sr

CB
23 Moses Reynolds, Sr
16 Dante Haeggans, Jr

Offense

X
16 Taylor Grimes, Jr
19 Baron Bradley, So

Y
12 Robert Ferrel, Sr
2 CJ Hardy, Jr

LT	LG	C	RG	RT
76 Nash Jones, So	74 Caleb Johnson, Sr	72 Reid Francis, Jr	61 Jimeto Obigbo, Fr	62 Dawson Kier, R-Sr
64 Dorian Strawn, Fr	77 Jayden Borjas, Jr	63 Stanley Mark, So	63 Stanley Mark, So	64 Dorian Strawn, Fr

TE
3 Roger McCuller, R-Sr
81 Parker Floyd, Jr
-or- 85 Christian Smith, Fr

Z
0 Darion Chafin, Sr
80 Devin Morrison, Jr

QB
7 Cam Ward, So
8 Kevin Yeager, Jr

Key reserves
83 Trevor Begue, R-Sr
92 Darien Townsend, R-Sr

RB
4 Kevin Brown, R-Sr
5 Marcus Cooper, Sr

Special teams
PK 50 Carson Mohr, Jr
PK 37 John Scifers, So
P 30 Keven Nguyen, Sr
P 37 John Scifers, So
KR 5 Marcus Cooper, Sr
PR 12 Robert Ferrel, Sr
LS 56 Joe Giordano, R-Sr
H 35 Chance Trentman-Rosas, Jr

== Postseason honors ==
The following Cardinals received postseason honors for the 2021 season:

Associated Press FCS All-American Second–Team
WR Taylor Grimes – Junior

Associated Press FCS All-American Third–Team
LB Kelechi Anyalebechi – Senior

Stats Perform FCS All-American Second–Team
QB Cam Ward – Sophomore
WR Taylor Grimes – Junior

Stats Perform FCS All-American Third–Team
LB Kelechi Anyalebechi – Senior

HERO Sports FCS All-American Second–Team
WR Taylor Grimes – Junior

Southland Conference Offensive Player of the Year
QB Cameron Ward – Sophomore

Southland Conference Coach of the Year
Eric Morris

All–Southland Conference First–Team
RB Kevin Brown – Graduate Senior
WR Taylor Grimes – Junior
OL Nash Jones – Sophomore
DL Cameron Preston – Senior
LB Kelechi Anyalebechi – Senior
DB Kaleb Culp – Sophomore
PR Robert Ferrel – Senior

All–Southland Conference Second–Team
QB Cameron Ward – Sophomore
WR Robert Ferrel – Senior
P Keven Nguyen – Senior
DL Brandon Bowen – Graduate Senior
LB Isaiah Paul – Sophomore
DB Rashon Davis – Graduate Senior

All–Southland Conference Third–Team
RB Marcus Cooper – Graduate Senior
WR Darion Chafin – Senior
OL Reid Francis – Junior
OL Caleb Johnson – Senior
OL Dawson Kier – Senior
DL Blaine Hoover – Senior
DB Elliott Davison – Sophomore
DB Moses Reynolds – Senior
DB Brandon Richard – Junior

== Game summaries ==
=== @ Youngstown State ===
Incarnate Word Cardinals at Youngstown State Penguins

Quarter	1	2	3	4	OT	Total
Cardinals	7	14	13	7	0	41
Penguins	14	10	7	10	3	44

at Stambaugh Stadium, Youngstown, OH

- Date: September 2
- Game time: 6:00 p.m.
- Game weather: Temperature: 69 • Wind: E 7 mph • Weather: Sunny
- Game attendance: 8,637
- Referee: Art Brown
- TV announcers (ESPN+): Drae Smith (play-by-play), Chris Sammarone (analyst)
- Box Score

Game information

First Quarter

- YSU – 6:22 Bryce Oliver 5 yard pass from Demeatric Crenshaw, Colt McFadden kick
  YSU 7–0 Drive: 8 plays, 80 yards, 4:12
- YSU – 4:34 Demeatric Crenshaw 3 yard run, Colt McFadden kick
  YSU 14–0 Drive: 4 plays, 30 yards, 0:56
- UIW – 0:56 Kevin Brown 29 yard run, Carson Mohr kick
  YSU 14–7 Drive: 8 plays, 75 yards, 3:38

Second Quarter

- YSU – 10:21 Colt McFadden 27 yard field goal
  YSU 17–7 Drive: 11 plays, 40 yards, 5:26
- UIW – 8:56 Darion Chafin 38 yard pass from Cam Ward, Carson Mohr kick
  YSU 17–14 Drive: 4 plays, 75 yards, 1:25
- UIW – 4:18 Taylor Grimes 9 yard pass from Cameron Ward, Carson Mohr kick
  UIW 21–17 Drive: 7 plays, 60 yards, 2:27
- YSU – 2:20 Jaleel McLaughlin 72 yard run, Colt McFadden kick
  YSU 24–21 Drive: 4 plays, 82 yards, 1:54

Third Quarter

- YSU – 7:00 Jaleel McLaughlin 11 yard run, Colt McFadden kick
  YSU 31–21 Drive: 15 plays, 82 yards, 7:55
- UIW – 3:49 Kevin Brown 1 yard run, Carson Mohr kick failed
  YSU 31–27 Drive: 10 plays, 74 yards, 3:05
- UIW – 0:48 Darion Chafin 20 yard pass from Cameron Ward, John Scifers kick
  UIW 34–31 Drive: 5 plays, 34 yards, 0:54

Fourth Quarter

- YSU – 2:15 Demeatric Crenshaw 9 yard run, Colt McFadden kick
  YSU 38–34 Drive: 5 plays, 30 yards, 2:17
- UIW – 0:39 Trevor Begue 2 yard pass from Cameron Ward, John Scifers kick
  UIW 41–38 Drive: 8 plays, 75 yards, 1:36
- YSU – 0:00 Colt McFadden 41 yard field goal
  Tied 41–41 Drive: 4 plays, 75 yards, 1:25

Overtime

- YSU – 0:00 Colt McFadden 27 yard field goal
  YSU 44–41 Drive: 5 plays, 15 yards, 0:00

Passing

- UIW – Cam Ward 28/47, 352 YDS, 4 TD
- YSU – Demeatric Crenshaw 9/12, 112 YDS, 1 TD

Rushing

- UIW – Kevin Brown 19 ATT, 118 YDS, 2 TD
- YSU – Jaleel McLaughlin 29 ATT, 242 YDS, 2 TD

Receiving

- UIW – Trevor Begue 5 REC, 81 YDS, 1 TD
- YSU – Jaleel McLaughlin 2 REC, 46 YDS

=== Prairie View A&M ===
Prairie View A&M Panthers at Incarnate Word Cardinals

Quarter	1	2	3	4	Total
Panthers	0	0	0	9	9
Cardinals	17	13	10	0	40

at Gayle and Tom Benson Stadium, San Antonio, TX

- Date: September 11
- Game time: 7:00 p.m.
- Game weather: Temperature: 88 • Wind: E 10 mph • Weather: Clear
- Game attendance: 2,517
- Referee: Ed Bourgeois
- TV announcers (ESPN+): David Saltzman (play-by-play), Taylor McHargue (analyst)
- Box Score

Game information

First Quarter

- UIW – 11:00 CJ Hardy 16 yard pass from Cam Ward, John Scifers kick
  UIW 7–0 Drive: 13 plays, 65 yards, 4:00
- UIW – 5:59 John Scifers 49 yard field goal
  UIW 10–0 Drive: 7 plays, 28 yards, 2:51
- UIW – 2:00 Marcus Cooper 16 yard run, John Scifers kick
  UIW 17–0 Drive: 6 plays, 42 yards, 1:46

Second Quarter

- UIW – 14:14 Kevin Brown 8 yard run, John Scifers kick blocked
  UIW 23–0 Drive: 6 plays, 36 yards, 1:23
- UIW – 1:38 Roger McCuller 9 yard pass from Cameron Ward, John Scifers kick
  UIW 30–0 Drive: 9 plays, 45 yards, 4:03

Third Quarter

- UIW – 8:29 Taylor Grimes 8 yard pass from Cameron Ward, John Scifers kick
  UIW 37–0 Drive: 2 plays, 8 yards, 0:11
- UIW – 5:19 John Scifers 45 yard field goal
  UIW 40–0 Drive: 4 plays, -4 yards, 0:46

Fourth Quarter

- PVAMU – 11:36 Luis Reyes 22 yard field goal
  UIW 40–3 Drive: 17 plays, 71 yards, 8:37
- PVAMU – 7:09 Colbey Washington 25 yard pass from Jawon Pass, Luis Reyes kick failed
  UIW 40–9 Drive: 7 plays, 60 yards, 2:35

Passing

- PVAMU – Jawon Pass 18/36, 188 YDS, 1 TD, 3 INT
- UIW – Cam Ward 21/38, 208 YDS, 3 TD

Rushing

- PVAMU – Kristian Mosley 13 ATT, 50 YDS
- UIW – Kevin Brown 12 ATT, 51 YDS, 1 TD

Receiving

- PVAMU – Colbey Washington 4 REC, 49 YDS 1 TD
- UIW – CJ Hardy 3 REC, 53 YDS, 1 TD

=== @ Texas State ===
Incarnate Word Cardinals at Texas State Bobcats

Quarter	1	2	3	4	Total
Cardinals	14	0	14	14	42
Bobcats	7	10	7	10	34

at Bobcat Stadium, San Marcos, TX

- Date: September 18
- Game time: 6:00 p.m.
- Game weather: Temperature: 95 • Wind: NE 9 mph • Weather: Sunny
- Game attendance: 16,107
- Referee: Jeremy Parker
- TV announcers (ESPN3): Brant Freeman (play-by-play), Keith Moreland (analyst) & Koral Riggs (sideline)
- Box Score

Game information

First Quarter

- TXST – 9:32 Jahmyl Jeter 1 yard run, Seth Keller kick
  TXST 7–0 Drive: 5 plays, 29 yards, 1:56
- UIW – 6:19 Kevin Brown 5 yard run, John Scifers kick
  Tied 7–7 Drive: 8 plays, 71 yards, 3:13
- UIW – 1:01 Robert Ferrel 32 yard pass from Cam Ward, John Scifers kick
  UIW 14–7 Drive: 8 plays, 63 yards, 2:32

Second Quarter

- TXST – 8:51 Jahmyl Jeter 1 yard run, Seth Keller kick
  Tied 14–14 Drive: 16 plays, 78 yards, 7:04
- TXST – 1:09 Seth Keller 33 yard field goal
  TXST 17–14 Drive: 11 plays, 64 yards, 4:00

Third Quarter

- UIW – 11:47 Marcus Cooper 9 yard run, John Scifers kick
  UIW 21–17 Drive: 6 plays, 74 yards, 1:45
- TXST – 8:03 Marcell Barbee 18 yard pass from Brady McBride, Seth Keller kick
  TXST 24–21 Drive: 8 plays, 75 yards, 3:44
- UIW – 1:35 Robert Ferrel 14 yard pass from Cameron Ward, John Scifers kick
  UIW 28–24 Drive: 8 plays, 48 yards, 4:20

Fourth Quarter

- TXST – 11:17 Marcell Barbee 4 yard pass from Brady McBride, Seth Keller kick
  TXST 31–28 Drive: 14 plays, 65 yards, 5:18
- UIW – 7:07 Darion Chafin 8 yard pass from Cameron Ward, John Scifers kick
  UIW 35–31 Drive: 7 plays, 30 yards, 2:19
- UIW – 2:48 Taylor Grimes 1 yard pass from Cameron Ward, John Scifers kick
  UIW 42–31 Drive: 6 plays, 68 yards, 3:07
- TXST – 0:58 Seth Keller 37 yard field goal
  UIW 42–34 Drive: 10 plays, 55 yards, 1:50

Passing

- UIW – Cam Ward 31/47, 376 YDS, 4 TD, 1 INT
- TXST – Brady McBride 25/41, 278 YDS, 2 TD

Rushing

- UIW – Marcus Cooper 10 ATT, 74 YDS, 1 TD
- TXST – Calvin Hill 16 ATT, 78 YDS

Receiving

- UIW – Robert Ferrel 10 REC, 132 YDS, 2 TD
- TXST – Javen Banks 6 REC, 64 YDS

=== McNeese State ===
McNeese State Cowboys at Incarnate Word Cardinals

Quarter	1	2	3	4	Total
Cowboys	0	0	0	0	0
Cardinals	14	7	7	3	31

at Gayle and Tom Benson Stadium, San Antonio, TX

- Date: September 25
- Game time: 11:00 a.m.
- Game weather: Temperature: 81 • Wind: SE 4 mph • Weather: Sunny and clear
- Game attendance: 1,633
- Referee: Ed Bourgeois
- TV announcers (ESPN+): Randy McIlvoy (play-by-play), Shea Walker (analyst), & Lainie Fritz (sideline)
- Box Score

Game information

First Quarter

- UIW – 10:41 Kevin Brown 14 yard run, John Scifers kick
  UIW 7–0 Drive: 12 plays, 75 yards, 4:24
- UIW – 8:52 Taylor Grimes 1 yard run, John Scifers kick
  UIW 14–0 Drive: 4 plays, 9 yards, 1:44

Second Quarter

- UIW – 2:47 Trevor Begue 56 yard pass from Cam Ward, John Scifers kick
  UIW 21–0 Drive: 7 plays, 80 yards, 2:41

Third Quarter

- UIW – 6:13 Taylor Grimes 11 yard pass from Cameron Ward, Carson Mohr kick
  UIW 28–0 Drive: 12 plays, 82 yards, 5:26

Fourth Quarter

- UIW – 12:01 Carson Mohr 25 yard field goal
  UIW 31–0 Drive: 9 plays, 71 yards, 3:40

Passing

- MCN – Cody Orgeron 22/36, 215 YDS, 1 INT
- UIW – Cam Ward 29/49, 352 YDS, 2 TD

Rushing

- MCN – Stephon Huderson 9 ATT, 37 YDS
- UIW – Kevin Brown 13 ATT, 65 YDS, 1 TD

Receiving

- MCN – Josh Matthews 3 REC, 59 YDS
- UIW – Trevor Begue 5 REC, 80 YDS, 1 TD

=== @ Northwestern State ===
Incarnate Word Cardinals at Northwestern State Demons

Quarter	1	2	3	4	Total
No. 24 Cardinals	14	14	7	3	38
Demons	0	13	7	7	27

at Harry Turpin Stadium, Natchitoches, LA

- Date: October 2
- Game time: 6:00 p.m.
- Game weather: Temperature: 80 • Wind: SSE 4 mph • Weather: Scattered storms
- Game attendance: 6,125
- Referee: Gary Leeper
- TV announcers (ESPN+): Jeff Palermo (play-by-play), Rene Nadeau (analyst) & Laura Sadler (sideline)
- Box Score

Game information

First Quarter

- UIW – 14:28 CJ Hardy 2 yard pass from Cam Ward, Carson Mohr kick
  UIW 7–0 Drive: 2 plays, 49 yards, 0:32
- UIW – 8:37 Marcus Cooper 60 yard run, Carson Mohr kick
  UIW 14–0 Drive: 6 plays, 85 yards, 2:09

Second Quarter

- NSU – 13:30 Eddie Godina 40 yard field goal
  UIW 14–3 Drive: 7 plays, 44 yards, 2:39
- UIW – 11:18 CJ Hardy 17 yard pass from Cameron Ward, Carson Mohr kick
  UIW 21–3 Drive: 9 plays, 75 yards, 2:12
- NSU – 9:30 Jay Griffin IV 53 yard pass from Kaleb Fletcher, Eddie Godina kick
  UIW 21–10 Drive: 4 plays, 65 yards, 1:42
- UIW – 5:48 Kevin Brown 54 yard pass from Cameron Ward, Carson Mohr kick
  UIW 28–10 Drive: 7 plays, 85 yards, 3:42
- NSU – 0:41 Eddie Godina 30 yard field goal
  UIW 28–13 Drive: 7 plays, 35 yards, 1:43

Third Quarter

- NSU – 5:01 Javonis Issac 1 yard pass from Kaleb Fletcher, Eddie Godina kick
  UIW 28–20 Drive: 5 plays, 43 yards, 1:57
- UIW – 3:22 Marcus Cooper 4 yard run, Carson Mohr kick
  UIW 35–20 Drive: 5 plays, 68 yards, 1:33

Fourth Quarter

- UIW – 8:40 Carson Mohr 23 yard field goal
  UIW 38–20 Drive: 10 plays, 54 yards, 4:42
- NSU – 4:08 Zachary Clement 2 yard run, Eddie Godina kick
  UIW 38–27 Drive: 14 plays, 75 yards, 4:32

Passing

- UIW – Cam Ward 25/37, 348 YDS, 3 TD, 2 INT
- NSU – Kaleb Fletcher 36/48, 319 YDS, 2 TD

Rushing

- UIW – Kevin Brown 15 ATT, 81 YDS
- NSU – Scooter Adams 13 ATT, 80 YDS

Receiving

- UIW – CJ Hardy 9 REC, 120 YDS, 2 TD
- NSU – Jay Griffin 3 REC, 72 YDS, 1 TD

=== Nicholls ===
Nicholls Colonels at Incarnate Word Cardinals

Quarter	1	2	3	4	Total
Colonels	7	14	0	0	21
No. 18 Cardinals	0	14	7	17	38

at Gayle and Tom Benson Stadium, San Antonio, TX

- Date: October 16
- Game time: 11:00 a.m.
- Game weather: Temperature: 69 • Wind: SSW 14 mph • Weather: Sunny
- Game attendance: 1,369
- Referee: Ed Bourgeois
- TV announcers (ESPN+): David Saltzman (play-by-play), Taylor McHargue (analyst), & Lainie Fritz (sideline)
- Box Score

Game information

First Quarter

- NSU – 5:48 Lindsey Scott Jr. 6 yard run, Gavin Lasseigne kick
  NSU 7–0 Drive: 9 plays, 76 yards, 4:41

Second Quarter

- NSU – 14:21 Dai'Jean Dixon 25 yard pass from Lindsey Scott, Jr., Gavin Lasseigne kick
  NSU 14–0 Drive: 9 plays, 84 yards, 4:33
- UIW – 13:30 Taylor Grimes 51 yard pass from Cam Ward, Carson Mohr kick
  NSU 14–7 Drive: 3 plays, 65 yards, 0:51
- NSU – 4:57 Collin Guggenheim 1 yard run, Gavin Lasseigne kick
  NSU 21–7 Drive: 16 plays, 65 yards, 8:33
- UIW – 3:26 Taylor Grimes 10 yard pass from Cameron Ward, Carson Mohr kick
  NSU 21–14 Drive: 3 plays, 80 yards, 1:25

Third Quarter

- UIW – 2:17 Taylor Grimes 49 yard pass from Cameron Ward, Carson Mohr kick
  Tied 21–21 Drive: 5 plays, 70 yards, 2:02

Fourth Quarter

- UIW – 10:21 Taylor Grimes 2 yard pass from Cameron Ward, Carson Mohr kick
  UIW 28–21 Drive: 10 plays, 71 yards, 4:28
- UIW – 6:46 Carson Mohr 40 yard field goal
  UIW 31–21 Drive: 6 plays, 43 yards, 1:49
- UIW – 0:50 Kevin Brown 26 yard run, Carson Mohr kick
  UIW 38–21 Drive: 3 plays, 40 yards, 1:30

Passing

- NSU – Lindsey Scott Jr. 19/29, 214 YDS, 1 TD, 1 INT
- UIW – Cam Ward 25/36, 388 YDS, 4 TD

Rushing

- NSU – Lindsey Scott, Jr. 20 ATT, 90 YDS, 1 TD
- UIW – Kevin Brown 14 ATT, 80 YDS, 1 TD

Receiving

- NSU – Dai'Jean Dixon 9 REC, 120 YDS, 1 TD
- UIW – Taylor Grimes 9 REC, 182 YDS, 4 TD

=== @ McNeese State ===
Incarnate Word Cardinals at McNeese State Cowboys

Quarter	1	2	3	4	Total
No. 16 Cardinals	0	6	6	8	20
Cowboys	14	7	0	7	28

at Cowboy Stadium, Lake Charles, LA

- Date: October 23
- Game time: 12:00 p.m.
- Game weather: Temperature: 83 • Wind: SE 10 mph • Weather: Mostly cloudy
- Game attendance: 7,498
- Referee: Nolan Dumas
- TV announcers (ESPN+): John Liddle (play-by-play, LaDarrin McLane (analyst), Shavonne Herndon (sideline)
- Box Score

Game information

First Quarter

- MCN – 9:06 Jamal Pettigrew 49 yard pass from Cody Orgeron, Nolan Heitmeier kick
  MCN 7–0 Drive: 5 plays, 71 yards, 2:42
- MCN – 5:15 Deonta McMahon 27 yard run, Nolan Heitmeier kick
  MCN 14–0 Drive: 5 plays, 47 yards, 2:21

Second Quarter

- MCN – 4:04 Deonta McMahon 11 yard run, Nolan Heitmeier kick
  MCN 21–0 Drive: 9 plays, 58 yards, 4:07
- UIW – 0:04 Taylor Grimes 4 yard pass from Cam Ward, Carson Mohr kick failed
  MCN 21–6 Drive: 12 plays, 87 yards, 9:35

Third Quarter

- UIW – 2:58 Kevin Brown 46 yard run, Cameron Ward rush failed
  MCN 21–12 Drive: 11 plays, 83 yards, 4:28

Fourth Quarter

- MCN – 10:08 Cody Orgeron 17 yard run, Nolan Heitmeier kick
  MCN 28–12 Drive: 1 play, 17 yards, 0:07
- UIW – 3:40 Robert Ferrel 6 yard pass from Cameron Ward, Kevin Brown rush
  MCN 28–20 Drive: 6 plays, 80 yards, 1:29

Passing

- UIW – Cam Ward 39/59, 455 YDS, 2 TD, 3 INT
- MCN – Cody Orgeron 10/12, 140 YDS, 1 TD

Rushing

- UIW – Kevin Brown 7 ATT, 69 YDS, 1 TD
- MCN – Deonta McMahon 13 ATT, 82 YDS, 2 TD

Receiving

- UIW – Taylor Grimes 10 REC, 169 YDS, 1 TD
- MCN – Jamal Pettigrew 1 REC, 49 YDS, 1 TD

=== Houston Baptist ===
Houston Baptist Huskies at Incarnate Word Cardinals

Quarter	1	2	3	4	Total
Huskies	0	7	7	7	21
No. 22 Cardinals	14	14	14	7	49

at Gayle and Tom Benson Stadium, San Antonio, TX

- Date: October 30
- Game time: 3:00 p.m.
- Game weather: Temperature: 79 • Wind: SW 7 mph • Weather: Sunny
- Game attendance: 2,711
- Referee: Gary Leeper
- TV announcers (ESPN+): David Saltzman (play-by-play, Shea Walker (analyst), Laura Sadler (sideline)
- Box Score

Game information

First Quarter

- UIW – 9:52 Robert Ferrel 3 yard pass from Cam Ward, Carson Mohr kick
  UIW 7–0 Drive: 13 plays, 65 yards, 5:08
- UIW – 3:30 Kevin Brown 28 yard run, Carson Mohr kick
  UIW 14–0 Drive: 9 plays, 87 yards, 3:37

Second Quarter

- UIW – 7:52 Robert Ferrel 31 yard pass from Cameron Ward, Carson Mohr kick
  UIW 21–0 Drive: 12 plays, 89 yards, 4:55
- HBU – 2:20 Tyson Thompson 2 yard pass from Orion Olivas, Gino Garcia kick
  UIW 21–7 Drive: 15 plays, 75 yards, 5:32
- UIW – 0:02 Darion Chafin 1 yard pass from Cameron Ward, Carson Mohr kick
  UIW 28–7 Drive: 11 plays, 66 yards, 2:10

Third Quarter

- HBU – 12:02 Xzavier Ford 10 yard run, Gino Garcia kick
  UIW 28–14 Drive: 11 plays, 75 yards, 2:58
- UIW – 6:00 Roger McCuller 14 yard pass from Cameron Ward, Carson Mohr kick
  UIW 35–14 Drive: 7 plays, 44 yards, 2:46
- UIW – 2:06 Marcus Cooper 14 yard run, Carson Mohr kick
  UIW 42–14 Drive: 3 plays, 31 yards, 0:45

Fourth Quarter

- HBU – 14:53 Christian Hood 0 yard fumble recovery, Gino Garcia kick
  UIW 42–21
- UIW – 11:30 Marcus Cooper 7 yard run, Carson Mohr kick
  UIW 49–21 Drive: 8 plays, 75 yards, 3:23

Passing

- HBU – Orion Olivas 38/49, 274 YDS, 1 TD, 1 INT
- UIW – Cam Ward 34/46, 328 YDS, 4 TD

Rushing

- HBU – Xzavier Ford 13 ATT, 62 YDS, 1 TD
- UIW – Marcus Cooper 18 ATT, 104 YDS, 2 TD

Receiving

- HBU – Tyson Thompson 16 REC, 103 YDS, 1 TD
- UIW – Robert Ferrel 10 REC, 102 YDS, 2 TD

=== No. 6 Southeastern Louisiana ===
Southeastern Louisiana Lions at Incarnate Word Cardinals

Quarter	1	2	3	4	Total
No. 6 Lions	7	10	21	14	52
No. 22 Cardinals	7	21	14	13	55

at Gayle and Tom Benson Stadium, San Antonio, TX

- Date: November 6
- Game time: 2:00 p.m.
- Game weather: Temperature: 68 • Wind: SE 2 mph • Weather: Clear, sunny
- Game attendance: 3,220
- Referee: Ed Bourgeois
- TV announcers (ESPN+): David Saltzman (play-by-play), Taylor McHargue (analyst), Lainie Fritz (sideline)
- Box Score

Game information

First Quarter

- UIW – 5:10 Taylor Grimes 16 yard pass from Cam Ward, Carson Mohr kick
  UIW 7–0 Drive: 3 plays, 79 yards, 0:58
- SLU – 0:07 Cole Kelley 4 yard run, Mateo Rengifo kick
  Tied 7–7 Drive: 11 plays, 77 yards, 4:56

Second Quarter

- UIW – 14:18 Darion Chafin 31 yard pass from Cameron Ward, Carson Mohr kick
  UIW 14–7 Drive: 7 plays, 75 yards, 0:49
- SLU – 10:52 Mateo Rengifo 36 yard field goal
  UIW 14–10 Drive: 10 plays, 60 yards, 3:20
- UIW – 4:58 Robert Ferrel 2 yard pass from Cameron Ward, Carson Mohr kick
  UIW 21–10 Drive: 9 plays, 79 yards, 2:58
- SLU – 1:31 Nolan Givan 7 yard pass from Cole Kelley, Mateo Rengifo kick
  UIW 21–17 Drive: 10 plays, 65 yards, 3:27
- UIW – 0:20 Darion Chafin 6 yard pass from Cameron Ward, Carson Mohr kick
  UIW 28–17 Drive: 8 plays, 75 yards, 2:46

Third Quarter

- SLU – 12:14 Cole Kelley 3 yard run, Mateo Rengifo kick
  UIW 28–24 Drive: 6 plays, 75 yards, 2:46
- UIW – 10:27 Taylor Grimes 25 yard pass from Cameron Ward, Carson Mohr kick
  UIW 35–24 Drive: 6 plays, 82 yards, 1:40
- SLU – 7:30 Austin Mitchell 49 yard pass from Cole Kelley, Mateo Rengifo kick
  UIW 35–31 Drive: 7 plays, 75 yards, 2:57
- UIW – 6:40 CJ Hardy 37 yard pass from Cameron Ward, Carson Mohr kick
  UIW 42–31 Drive: 5 plays, 73 yards, 0:50
- SLU – 2:36 Gage Larvadain 10 yard pass from Cole Kelley, Mateo Rengifo kick
  UIW 42–38 Drive: 11 plays, 75 yards, 4:04

Fourth Quarter

- SLU – 11:22 Taron Jones 2 yard run, Mateo Rengifo kick
  SLU 45–42 Drive: 11 plays, 87 yards, 4:12
- UIW – 4:05 Kevin Brown 80 yard pass from Cameron Ward, Carson Mohr kick
  UIW 49–45 Drive: 4 plays, 91 yards, 1:14
- SLU – 1:55 Cole Kelley 4 yard run, Mateo Rengifo kick
  SLU 52–49 Drive: 5 plays, 75 yards, 2:10
- UIW – 0:25 Robert Ferrel 24 yard pass from Cameron Ward, Carson Mohr kick failed
  UIW 55–52 Drive: 9 plays, 75 yards, 1:30

Passing

- SLU – Cole Kelley 50/68, 647 YDS, 3 TD
- UIW – Cam Ward 34/52, 610 YDS, 7 TD, 1 INT

Rushing

- SLU – Taron Jones 10 ATT, 56 YDS, 1 TD
- UIW – Kevin Brown 6 ATT, 65 YDS

Receiving

- SLU – Austin Mitchell 9 REC, 169 YDS, 1 TD
- UIW – Taylor Grimes 12 REC, 193 YDS, 2 TD

=== @ Nicholls ===
Incarnate Word Cardinals at Nicholls Colonels

Quarter	1	2	3	4	Total
No. 17 Cardinals	0	13	14	0	27
Colonels	10	10	0	3	23

at Manning Field at John L. Guidry Stadium, Thibodaux, LA

- Date: November 13
- Game time: 3:00 p.m.
- Game weather: Temperature: 60 • Wind: NNW 11 mph • Weather: Clear
- Game attendance: 6,392
- Referee: Craig Helser
- TV announcers (ESPN+): John Liddle (play-by-play), Gary Reasons (analyst), Lainie Fritz (sideline)
- Box Score

Game information

First Quarter

- NSU – 8:09 Gavin Lasseigne 21 yard field goal
  NSU 3–0 Drive: 13 plays, 71 yards, 6:51
- NSU – 3:41 Al'Dontre Davis 21 yard pass from Kohen Granier, Gavin Lasseigne kick
  NSU 10–0 Drive: 7 plays, 92 yards, 2:49

Second Quarter

- UIW – 10:35 Roger McCuller 6 yard pass from Cam Ward, Carson Mohr kick
  NSU 10–7 Drive: 8 plays, 23 yards, 2:10
- UIW – 8:03 Darion Chafin 13 yard pass from Cameron Ward, Carson Mohr kick blocked
  UIW 13–10 Drive: 2 plays, 17 yards, 0:25
- NSU – 2:33 Collin Guggenheim 2 yard run, Gavin Lasseigne kick
  NSU 17–13 Drive: 11 plays, 61 yards, 5:23
- NSU – 0:08 Gavin Lasseigne 19 yard field goal
  NSU 20–13 Drive: 8 plays, 33 yards, 2:09

Third Quarter

- UIW – 8:00 Kevin Brown 55 yard run, Carson Mohr kick
  Tied 20–20 Drive: 2 plays, 64 yards, 0:30
- UIW – 0:08 Kevin Brown 80 yard run, Carson Mohr kick
  UIW 27–20 Drive: 2 plays, 96 yards, 0:58

Fourth Quarter

- NSU – 9:20 Gavin Lasseigne 45 yard field goal
  UIW 27–23 Drive: 8 plays, 52 yards, 2:43

Passing

- UIW – Cam Ward 13/30, 108 YDS, 2 TD, 2 INT
- NSU – Kohen Granier 18/27, 191 YDS, 1 TD

Rushing

- UIW – Kevin Brown 11 ATT, 185 YDS, 2 TD
- NSU – Collin Guggenheim 32 ATT, 141 YDS, 1 TD

Receiving

- UIW – Robert Ferrel 4 REC, 47 YDS
- NSU – Dai'Jean Dixon 8 REC, 90 YDS

=== @ Houston Baptist ===
Incarnate Word Cardinals at Houston Baptist Huskies

Quarter	1	2	3	4	Total
No. 18 Cardinals	35	7	10	3	55
Huskies	0	14	0	0	14

at Husky Stadium, Houston, TX

- Date: November 20
- Game time: 2:00 p.m.
- Game weather: Temperature: 78 • Wind: NW 9 mph • Weather: Sunny
- Game attendance: 1,931
- Referee: Craig Helser
- TV announcers (ESPN+): Randy McIlvoy (play-by-play), Shea Walker (analyst), Laura Sadler (sideline)
- Box Score

Game information

First Quarter

- UIW – 11:56 Kevin Brown 2 yard run, Carson Mohr kick
  UIW 7–0 Drive: 5 plays, 12 yards, 2:07
- UIW – 11:50 Moses Reynolds 26 yard interception return, Carson Mohr kick
  UIW 14–0
- UIW – 9:18 CJ Hardy 25 yard pass from Cam Ward, Carson Mohr kick
  UIW 21–0 Drive: 3 plays, 33 yards, 0:25
- UIW – 6:35 Marcus Cooper 4 yard run, Carson Mohr kick
  UIW 28–0 Drive: 6 plays, 60 yards, 1:30
- UIW – 2:05 Darion Chafin 11 yard pass from Cameron Ward, Carson Mohr kick
  UIW 35–0 Drive: 6 plays, 79 yards, 2:25

Second Quarter

- HBU – 13:27 Ean Beek 2 yard run, Gino Garcia kick
  UIW 35–7 Drive: 11 plays, 75 yards, 3:38
- HBU – 7:10 Corey Smooth 36 yard interception return, Gino Garcia kick
  UIW 35–14
- UIW – 4:08 Darion Chafin 12 yard pass from Cameron Ward, Carson Mohr kick
  UIW 42–14 Drive: 9 plays, 75 yards, 3:02

Third Quarter

- UIW – 9:53 Kevin Brown 2 yard run, Carson Mohr kick
  UIW 49–14 Drive: 12 plays, 75 yards, 5:07
- UIW – 6:41 Carson Mohr 42 yard field goal
  UIW 52–14 Drive: 5 plays, 17 yards, 2:37

Fourth Quarter

- UIW – 4:39 Carson Mohr 21 yard field goal
  UIW 55–14 Drive: 11 plays, 20 yards, 6:34

Passing

- UIW – Cam Ward 27/34, 314 YDS, 3 TD, 1 INT
- HBU – Orion Olivas 10/24, 79 YDS, 4 INT

Rushing

- UIW – Marcus Cooper 11 ATT, 87 YDS, 1 TD
- HBU – Ean Beek 7 ATT, 45 YDS, 1 TD

Receiving

- UIW – Robert Ferrel 7 REC, 78 YDS
- HBU – Lane Botkin 3 REC, 40 YDS

== FCS playoffs ==
=== Stephen F. Austin – first round ===
FCS playoffs first round

Quarter	1	2	3	4	OT	Total
No. 20 Lumberjacks	0	14	0	14	0	28
No. 13 Cardinals	7	7	7	7	7	35

at Gayle and Tom Benson Stadium, San Antonio, TX

- Date: November 27, 2021
- Game time: 2:00 p.m.
- Game weather: Temperature: 51 • Wind: Calm • Weather: Cloudy & overcast
- Game attendance: 3,448
- Referee: Jason Soistman
- TV announcers (ESPN+): David Saltzman (play-by-play) & Taylor McHargue (analyst)
- Box Score

Game information

First quarter

- UIW – 7:08 Taylor Grimes 4 yard pass from Cam Ward, Carson Mohr kick
  UIW 7–0 Drive: 11 plays, 65 yards, 4:43

Second quarter

- SFA – 14:50 QuenTyvian Borders 2 yard pass from Trae Self, Chris Campos kick
  Tied 7–7 Drive: 5 plays, 99 yards, 2:49
- UIW – 11:09 Cameron Ward 6 yard run, Carson Mohr kick
  UIW 14–7 Drive: 9 plays, 79 yards, 3:34
- SFA – 1:30 QuenTyvian Borders 8 yard pass from Trae Self, Chris Campos kick
  Tied 14–14 Drive: 7 plays, 75 yards, 3:18

Third quarter

- UIW – 2:34 Taylor Grimes 23 yard pass from Cameron Ward, Carson Mohr kick
  UIW 21–14 Drive: 9 plays, 80 yards, 4:02

Fourth quarter

- SFA – 8:00 Keshon Williams 5 yard pass from Trae Self, Chris Campos kick
  Tied 21–21 Drive: 12 plays, 55 yards, 5:36
- SFA – 5:16 Rayshad Nichols 32 yard fumble recovery, Chris Campos kick
  SFA 28–21
- UIW – 0:38 Taylor Grimes 7 yard pass from Cameron Ward, Carson Mohr kick
  Tied 28–28 Drive: 15 plays, 75 yards, 4:38

Overtime

- UIW – 0:00 Robert Ferrel 6 yard pass from Cameron Ward, Carson Mohr kick
  UIW 35–28

Passing

- SFA – Trae Self 21/37, 243 YDS, 3 TD, 2 INT
- UIW – Cam Ward 39/54, 328 YDS, 4 TD

Rushing

- SFA – Miles Reed 20 ATT, 86 YDS
- UIW – Kevin Brown 10 ATT, 44 YDS

Receiving

- SFA – Xavier Gipson 6 REC, 101 YDS
- UIW – Taylor Grimes 10 REC, 118 YDS, 3 TD

=== @ Sam Houston – second round ===
FCS playoffs second round

Quarter	1	2	3	4	Total
No. 13 Cardinals	7	14	7	14	42
No. 1 Bearkats	10	21	3	15	49

at Bowers Stadium, Huntsville, TX

- Date: December 4, 2021
- Game time: 2:00 p.m.
- Game weather: Temperature: 76 • Wind: S 5 mph • Weather: Overcast
- Game attendance: 6,722
- Referee: Matt Gallagher
- TV announcers (ESPN+): David Saltzman (play-by-play), Forrest Conoly (analyst)
- Box Score

Game information

First quarter

- UIW – 11:39 Taylor Grimes 3 yard pass from Cam Ward, Carson Mohr kick
  UIW 7–0 Drive: 13 plays, 75 yards, 3:21
- SHSU – 5:41 Noah Smith 3 yard run, Seth Morgan kick
  Tied 7–7 Drive: 9 plays, 51 yards, 2:46
- SHSU – 0:21 Seth Morgan 37 yard field goal
  SHSU 10–7 Drive: 8 plays, 54 yards, 3:07

Second quarter

- UIW – 13:34 Marcus Cooper 40 yard run, Carson Mohr kick
  UIW 14–10 Drive: 5 plays, 75 yards, 1:47
- SHSU – 11:54 Ramon Jefferson 48 yard run, Seth Morgan kick
  SHSU 17–14 Drive: 4 plays, 76 yards, 1:31
- SHSU – 8:25 Jequez Ezzard 22 yard pass from Eric Schmid, Seth Morgan kick
  SHSU 24–14 Drive: 4 plays, 91 yards, 2:02
- SHSU – 1:51 Eric Schmid 9 yard run, Seth Morgan kick
  SHSU 31–14 Drive: 8 plays, 83 yards, 2:41
- UIW – 0:19 Darion Chafin 1 yard pass from Cameron Ward, Carson Mohr kick
  SHSU 31–21 Drive: 12 plays, 75 yards, 1:32

Third quarter

- UIW – 9:22 Robert Ferrel 16 yard pass from Cameron Ward, Carson Mohr kick
  SHSU 31–28 Drive: 9 plays, 63 yards, 4:14
- SHSU – 1:10 Seth Morgan 34 yard field goal
  SHSU 34–28 Drive: 12 plays, 68 yards, 6:00

Fourth quarter

- UIW – 14:52 Darion Chafin 48 yard pass from Cameron Ward, Carson Mohr kick
  UIW 35–34 Drive: 5 plays, 77 yards, 1:13
- SHSU – 8:13 Ramon Jefferson 1 yard run, Noah Smith pass
  SHSU 42–35 Drive: 13 plays, 70 yards, 6:34
- UIW – 7:50 Trevor Begue 62 yard pass from Cameron Ward, Carson Mohr kick
  Tied 42–42 Drive: 2 plays, 75 yards, 0:23
- SHSU – 2:07 Eric Schmid 3 yard run, Seth Morgan kick
  SHSU 49–42 Drive: 12 plays, 75 yards, 5:43

Passing

- UIW – Cam Ward 39/61, 481 YDS, 5 TD
- SHSU – Eric Schmid 21/32, 210 YDS, 1 TD

Rushing

- UIW – Kevin Brown 12 ATT, 64 YDS
- SHSU – Ramon Jefferson 22 ATT, 166 YDS, 2 TD

Receiving

- UIW – Darion Chafin 11 REC, 172 YDS, 2 TD
- SHSU – Jequez Ezzard 4 REC, 60 YDS, 1 TD

== Rankings ==
Ranking movements Legend: ██ Increase in ranking ██ Decrease in ranking — = Not ranked RV = Received votes
	Week														
Poll	Pre	1	2	3	4	5	6	7	8	9	10	11	12	13	Final
STATS FCS	RV	—	—	RV	24	20	18	16	22	17	18	13	13	13	12
Coaches	—	—	—	—	RV	RV	RV	RV	RV	21	19	15	15	15	13
