= 2020 Incarnate Word Cardinals football team =

American college football season

2020 Incarnate Word Cardinals football
- Conference: Southland Conference
- Record: 3–3 (3–3 Southland)
- Head coach: Eric Morris (3rd season)
- Offensive coordinator: Cody Crill (3rd season)
- Offensive scheme: Air raid
- Defensive coordinator: Justin Deason (3rd season)
- Base defense: Multiple
- Home stadium: Gayle and Tom Benson Stadium

2020 Southland Conference football standings
	Conf.			Overall
Team	W		L	W		L
No. 1 Sam Houston State $^	6	–	0	10	–	0
No. 20 Southeastern Louisiana	4	–	2	4	–	3
No. 23 Nicholls	3	–	3	4	–	3
Incarnate Word	3	–	3	3	–	3
Lamar	2	–	4	2	–	4
McNeese State*	2	–	4	3	–	4
Northwestern State	1	–	5	1	–	5
$ – Conference champion; ^ – FCS playoff participant; * – Ineligible for FCS postseason play due to NCAA sanctions Note: Abilene Christian, Central Arkansas, Houston Baptist, and Stephen F. Austin played only in the fall and opted out of the spring season.; Rankings from STATS Poll

The 2020 Incarnate Word Cardinals football team represented the University of the Incarnate Word (UIW) in the 2020–21 NCAA Division I FCS football season as a member of the Southland Conference. The Cardinals played their home games at Gayle and Tom Benson Stadium in San Antonio, Texas. They were led by third-year head coach Eric Morris. On August 13 Incarnate Word announced they would postpone all competition for the Fall 2020 and instead opted for a Spring 2021 season.

== Preseason ==
=== Preseason poll ===
The Southland Conference released their spring preseason poll in January 2021. The Cardinals were picked to finish fifth in the conference. In addition, two Cardinals were chosen to the Preseason All-Southland Team.

=== Preseason All–Southland Teams ===
Defense

2nd Team

- Kelechi Anyalabechi – Linebacker, JR
- Jaylon Jimmerson – Defensive Back, SO

== Schedule ==
Date	Time	Opponent	Rank	Site	TV	Result	Attendance
February 27, 2021	12:00 p.m.	at No. 19 McNeese State		Cowboy Stadium; Lake Charles, LA	ESPN+	W 48–20	2,394
March 6, 2021	3:00 p.m.	at Lamar		Provost Umphrey Stadium; Beaumont, TX	ESPN+	W 42–20	3,201
March 20, 2021	2:00 p.m.	No. 16 Southeastern Louisiana	No. 22	Gayle and Tom Benson Stadium; San Antonio, TX	ESPN+	W 56–45	1,200
March 27, 2021	11:00 a.m.	at No. 17 Nicholls	No. 13	John L. Guidry Stadium; Thibodaux, LA	ESPN+	L 45–75	4,236
April 10, 2021	7:00 p.m.	Northwestern State	No. 19	Gayle and Tom Benson Stadium; San Antonio, TX	ESPN+	L 47–49	1,055
April 17, 2021	11:00 a.m.	No. 5 Sam Houston State	No. 25	Gayle and Tom Benson Stadium; San Antonio, TX	ESPN+	L 14–42	743
Rankings from STATS Poll released prior to the game; All times are in Central time

== Personnel ==
=== Coaching staff ===
Name	Position	Alma mater	Joined staff
Eric Morris	Head coach	Texas Tech (2008)	2018
Jordan Davis	Assistant Head Coach / Wide Receivers	Texas Tech (2014)	2018
Justin Deason	Defensive Coordinator	Central Oklahoma (2003)	2018
Cody Crill	Offensive Coordinator	Angelo State (2002)	2018
Brandon Lechtenberg	Linebackers / Special Teams Coordinator	Nebraska	2018
Clint Killough	Inside Receivers / Recruiting Coordinator	Incarnate Word (2015)	2018
Darren Garrigan	Defensive Backs / Pass Game Coordinator	West Texas A&M (2009)	2018
Matthew Gregg	Outside Linebackers	Southern Nazarene	2019
Mack Leftwich	Quarterbacks	UTEP (2017)	2018
Jordan Shoemaker	Offensive Line / Run Game Coordinator	Houston (2011)	2018
Brett Watson	Defensive Line / Academic Coordinator	West Texas A&M (2009)	2018
Scotty Yates	Quality Control / Defensive Backs	Texas A&M University–Commerce (2015)	2019
Bret Huth	Director of Strength and Conditioning	John Carroll (2010)	2018
Jimmy Fowler	Director of Football Operations		2021

=== Roster ===
2020 Incarnate Word Cardinals football
Quarterback: 5 Kevin Yeager – sophomore (6'1, 204); 7 Cam Ward – freshman (6'3, 225); 16 Mark Torrez – (redshirt) junior (6'0, 190); Running back: 4 Kevin Brown – senior (5'9, 204); 22 Ameer King – junior (5'8, 180); 26 Kaleb Ducros – sophomore (5'11, 197); 29 Keyondrick Philio – senior (6'0, 210); 35 Chance Trentman–Rosas – sophomore (6'2, 230); 36 Tyrese Brown – freshman (5'10, 190); 48 Malique Harris – freshman (5'9, 145); Wide receiver: 2 CJ Hardy – sophomore (5'11, 189); 6 Jayden Jones – freshman (6'2, 200); 8 Darion Chafin – junior (6'2, 200); 9 Tre Wolf – (redshirt) junior (6'0, 175); 10 Kailan Noseff – junior (6'3, 200); 11 Kamden Perry – sophomore (6'0, 190); 12 Robert Ferrel – junior (5'9, 170); 13 Marquez Perez – (redshirt) sophomore (5'11, 184); 14 Emerson Haywood – freshman (6'1, 175); 15 Jaelin Campbell – junior (6'1, 182); 17 Mark Sullivan – junior (6'2, 163); 19 Baron Bradley – freshman (6'1, 190); 80 Devin Morrison – junior (6'1, 195); 84 Jalen Smothers – freshman (5'10, 175); 87 Golden Madrigal – sophomore (5'8, 150); 88 Liam Capobianco – sophomore (6'3, 179); 89 Marcus Harmon – sophomore (5'10, 165); Tight end: 3 Roger McCuller – senior (6'1, 216)	Offensive line: 55 Aaron Martinez – freshman (6'2, 295); 60 Dayton Lewis – freshman (6'0, 268); 62 Dawson Kier – (redshirt) senior (6'3, 279); 63 Stanley Mark – sophomore (6'3, 295); 64 Nash Jones – freshman (6'3, 286); 68 Jhase Edwards – sophomore (6'3, 279); 69 Jace Davis – freshman (6'1, 266); 72 Reid Francis – sophomore (6'4, 307); 73 Jeremiah Williams – junior (6'1, 292); 74 Caleb Johnson – junior (6'6, 306); 75 Michael Vargas – freshman (6'5, 275); 77 Jayden Borjas – sophomore (6'5, 294); 78 Uzoma Okere – senior (6'2, 292); 79 Joseph Kimmey – sophomore (6'6, 315); Defensive line: 11 Blaine Hoover – DE – (redshirt) junior (6'6, 240); 41 Darius Richmond – DT – sophomore (6'2, 269); 43 Mason Meyer – DE – sophomore (6'3, 254); 45 Jared Soyring – DT – junior (6'3, 274); 47 Seth Jaquess – DE – sophomore (6'4, 229); 54 Greg Chimielewski – DE – freshman (6'7, 245); 58 Martin Klassen – DE – freshman (6'5, 235); 61 Jordan Bussey – DE – sophomore (6'0, 245); 90 Sam Latham – DE – sophomore (6'6, 253); 91 Darien Townsend – DE – (redshirt) senior (6'3, 260); 93 Cameron Preston – DT – junior (6'2, 298); 94 Shaq Lebeauf – DE – Sophomore (6'3, 250); 95 Chance Main – DE – junior (6'5, 245); 96 Maverick McCaskill – DT – senior (6'3, 283); 97 Josh Jackson – DT – junior (6'0, 301); 98 Alex Criddle – DT – senior (6'3, 302); 99 Royce Wellington – DT – junior (6'1, 315)	Linebacker: 7 Torrain Hampton – (redshirt) senior (6'4, 216); 8 Kelechi Anyalebechi – junior (6'1, 262); 21 Isaiah Paul – (redshirt) sophomore (6'2, 241); 27 Urijah Marrow – sophomore (5'9, 164); 31 Mason Barnes – junior (5'10, 188); 32 Gerald Bowie III – junior (6'1, 234); 33 Jerick Pitre – (redshirt) senior (5'11, 201); 34 Tah Mac Bright – freshman (6'2, 215); 38 Tylan George – freshman (5'11, 215); 40 Coby Walker – freshman (6'2, 210); 46 Frederick Rich – freshman (6'1, 215); Defensive back: 0 Tre Richardson – CB – sophomore (6'1, 167); 1 Ce'Cori Tolds – ATH – junior (5'10, 151); 4 Kylan Thomas – DB – freshman (5'11, 190); 5 Dalvin Fillmore – S – junior (6'0, 190); 10 Elijah Blue – DB – senior (6'0, 193); 15 Shawn Holton – S – sophomore (5'10, 166); 16 Dante Heaggans – ATH – sophomore (6'0, 182); 17 Brandon Richard – CB – sophomore (5'11, 183); 18 Reese Watson – CB – sophomore (6'0, 176); 20 Kaleb Kulp – DB – freshman (5'10, 185); 23 Moses Reynolds – DB – (redshirt) senior (6'2, 200); 24 Elliott Davison – DB – freshman (6'0, 162); 39 Brandon Sanders – S – senior (6'0, 199); 49 Hilario Gomez – freshman (5'1, 185); Kicker: 50 Carson Mohr – sophomore (5'8, 143); 59 John Scifers – freshman (6'0, 160); Punter: 30 Keven Nguyen – junior (5'10, 175); 37 Cade Kostroun – senior (6'3, 178); Legend: (C) Team captain; (S) Suspended; (I) Ineligible; Injured; Redshirt

== Depth chart ==
Defense

STAR
17 Brandon Richard, So
4 Kylan Thomas, Fr

FS
24 Elliot Davison, Fr
18 Reese Watson, So

MO	MIKE
21 Isaiah Paul, R-Fr -or- 32 Gerald Bowie III, Jr	8 Kelechi Anyalebechi, Jr
⋅	38 Tylan George, Fr

SS
15 Shawn Holton, So
31 Mason Barnes, Jr

CB
1 Ce'Cori Tolds, Jr
0 Tre Richardson, So

DE	DT	DT	DE
11 Blaine Hoover, R-Jr	98 Alex Criddle, Sr	93 Cam Preston, Jr	95 Chance Main, Jr
90 Sam Latham, So	97 Josh Jackson, Jr	41 Darius Richmond, So -or- 96 Maverick McCaskill, Sr	91 Darien Townsend, Gr -or- 47 Seth Jacquess, So

CB
23 Moses Reynolds, R-Sr
16 Dante Haeggans, So
-or-
10 Elijah Blue, Sr

Offense

X
15 Jaelin Campbell, Jr
17 Mark Sullivan, Jr

Z
8 Darion Chafin, Jr
10 Kailan Noseff, Jr

LT	LG	C	RG	RT
62 Dawson Kier, Sr	68 Jhase Edwards, So	72 Reid Francis, So	74 Caleb Johnson, Jr	64 Nash Jones, Fr
75 Michael Vargas, Fr	78 Uzoma Okere, Sr	73 Jeremiah Williams, Jr	63 Stanley Mark, So	77 Jayden Borjas, So

H
12 Robert Ferrel, Jr
22 Ameer King, Jr

Y
9 Tre Wolf, Jr
2 CJ Hardy, So

QB
7 Cam Ward, Fr
5 Kevin Yeager, So

Key reserves
TE 3 Roger McCuller, Sr
LB 7 Torrain Hampton, R-Sr
RB 29 Keyondrick Philio, Sr
S 5 Dalvin Fillmore, Jr
LB 33 Jerick Pitre, R-Sr

RB
4 Kevin Brown, Sr
26 Kaleb Ducros, So

Special teams
PK 92 Carson Mohr, So
PK 59 John Scifers, Fr
P 30 Keven Nguyen, Jr
P 37 Cade Kostroun, Sr
KR 1 Ce'Cori Tolds, Jr
PR 12 Robert Ferrel, Jr
LS 35 Chance Trentman-Rosas, So

== Postseason honors ==
The following Cardinals received postseason honors for the 2020 season:

STATS Perform FCS Jerry Rice Award
QB Cam Ward – Freshman

Southland Conference Freshman of the Year
QB Cameron Ward

All–Southland Conference Spring Football First–Team
RB Kevin Brown – Senior
LB Kelechi Anyalebechi – Junior
KR Ce'Cori Tolds – Junior

All–Southland Conference Spring Football Second–Team
WR Robert Ferrel – Junior
OL Caleb Johnson – Junior
DL Cameron Preston – Junior
DB Shawn Holton – Sophomore
PR Robert Ferrel – Junior

All–Southland Conference Spring Football Third–Team
QB Cameron Ward – Freshman
OL Nash Jones – Freshman
OL Reid Francis – Freshman
K Carson Mohr – Sophomore
DL Blaine Hoover – Junior
DL Chance Main – Junior
LB Isaiah Paul – Freshman
DB Elliott Davison – Freshman

== Game summaries ==
=== @ McNeese State ===
Incarnate Word Cardinals at McNeese State Cowboys

Quarter	1	2	3	4	Total
Cardinals	14	17	3	14	48
No. 19 Cowboys	3	0	7	10	20

at Cowboy Stadium, Lake Charles, LA

- Date: February 27, 2021
- Game time: 12:00 p.m.
- Game weather: Cloudy
- Game attendance: 2,394
- Referee: Ed Bourgeois
- TV announcers (ESPN+): Randy McIlvoy (play-by-play), Shea Walker (analyst)
- Box Score

Game information

First Quarter

- UIW – 8:13 Kaleb Ducros 35 yard pass from Cameron Ward, Carson Mohr kick
  UIW 7–0 Drive: 9 plays, 80 yards, 2:24
- MCN – 2:05 Jacob Abel 25 yard field goal
  UIW 7–3 Drive: 12 plays, 64 yards, 6:01
- UIW – 1:51 Ce'Cori Tolds 100 yard kickoff return, Carson Mohr kick
  UIW 14–3

Second Quarter

- UIW – 11:37 Carson Mohr 36 yard field goal
  UIW 17–3 Drive: 8 plays, 44 yards, 1:45
- UIW – 9:56 Darion Chafin 56 yard pass from Cameron Ward, Carson Mohr kick
  UIW 24–3 Drive: 2 plays, 57 yards, 0:31
- UIW – 4:40 Jaelin Campbell 27 yard pass from Cameron Ward, Carson Mohr kick
  UIW 31–3 Drive: 9 plays, 85 yards, 4:13

Third Quarter

- MCN – 2:54 Carlo Williams 9 yard run, Jacob Abel kick
  UIW 31–10 Drive: 17 plays, 80 yards, 6:47
- UIW – 0:28 Carson Mohr 48 yard field goal
  UIW 34–10 Drive: 8 plays, 44 yards, 2:26

Fourth Quarter

- UIW – 12:24 Roger McCuller 8 yard pass from Cameron Ward, Carson Mohr kick
  UIW 41–10 Drive: 5 plays, 54 yards, 1:51
- MCN – 8:34 Jacob Abel 27 yard field goal
  UIW 41–13 Drive: 8 plays, 65 yards, 3:50
- MCN – 4:21 Cody Orgeron 12 yard run, Jacob Abel kick
  UIW 41–20 Drive: 5 plays, 50 yards, 1:47
- UIW – 0:33 Ameer King 3 yard pass from Kevin Yeager, Carson Mohr kick
  UIW 48–20 Drive: 6 plays, 75 yards, 3:48

Passing

- UIW – Cam Ward 24/35, 306 YDS, 4 TD
- MCN – Cody Orgeron 18/32, 202 YDS

Rushing

- UIW – Kevin Brown 10 ATT, 117 YDS
- MCN – Cody Orgeron 18 ATT, 72 YDS, 1 TD

Receiving

- UIW – Jaelin Campbell 6 REC, 93 YDS, 1 TD
- MCN – Josh Matthews 4 REC, 65 YDS

=== @ Lamar ===
Incarnate Word Cardinals at Lamar Cardinals

Quarter	1	2	3	4	Total
Cardinals (UIW)	14	7	14	7	42
Cardinals (LU)	7	10	3	0	20

at Provost Umphrey Stadium, Beaumont, TX

- Date: March 6, 2021
- Game time: 3:00 p.m.
- Game weather: Temperature: 67 • Wind: NNE 8 mph • Weather: Clear skies
- Game attendance: 3,201
- Referee: Ed Bourgeois
- TV: ESPN+
- Box Score

Game information

First Quarter

- LU – 9:17 Jeremy Davis 5 yard pass from Jalen Dummett, Bailey Giffen kick
  LU 7–0 Drive: 7 plays, 66 yards, 3:33
- UIW – 8:22 Kevin Brown 66 yard run, Carson Mohr kick
  Tied 7–7 Drive: 3 plays, 75 yards, 0:55
- UIW – 1:29 Kevin Brown 20 yard pass from Cameron Ward, Carson Mohr kick
  UIW 14–7 Drive: 8 plays, 78 yards, 2:26

Second Quarter

- LU – 11:48 Chaz Ward 2 yard run, Baley Giffen kick
  Tied 14–14 Drive: 10 plays, 75 yards, 4:41
- LU – 3:03 Bailey Giffen 49 yard field goal
  LU 17–14 Drive: 12 plays, 43 yards, 6:00
- UIW – 1:14 Darion Chafin 4 yard pass from Cameron Ward, Carson Mohr kick
  UIW 21–17 Drive: 7 plays, 63 yards, 1:40

Third Quarter

- UIW – 11:07 Cameron Ward 1 yard run, Carson Mohr kick
  UIW 28–17 Drive: 11 plays, 84 yards, 3:48
- LU – 4:27 Bailey Giffen 46 yard field goal
  UIW 28–20 Drive: 12 plays, 54 yards, 6:31
- UIW – 0:35 Robert Ferrel 17 yard pass from Cameron Ward, Carson Mohr kick
  UIW 35–20 Drive: 12 plays, 83 yards, 3:45

Fourth Quarter

- UIW – 7:29 Jaelin Campbell 21 yard pass from Cameron Ward, Carson Mohr kick
  UIW 42–20 Drive: 3 plays, 26 yards, 1:02

Passing

- UIW – Cam Ward 29/44, 341 YDS, 4 TD, 2 INT
- LU – Jalen Dummett 9/14, 116 YDS, 1 TD, 1 INT

Rushing

- UIW – Kevin Brown 13 ATT, 196 YDS, 1 TD
- LU – Chaz Ward 26 ATT, 105 YDS, 1 TD

Receiving

- UIW – Jaelin Campbell 4 REC, 78 YDS, 1 TD
- LU – Marcel Johnson, 7 REC, 88 YDS

=== Southeastern Louisiana ===
Southeastern Louisiana Lions at Incarnate Word Cardinals

Quarter	1	2	3	4	Total
No. 16 Lions	7	9	14	15	45
No. 22 Cardinals	7	28	21	0	56

at Gayle and Tom Benson Stadium, San Antonio, TX

- Date: March 20, 2021
- Game time: 2:00 p.m.
- Game weather: Temperature: 70 • Wind: W 7 mph • Weather: Sunny
- Game attendance: 1,200
- Referee: Vidal Jones
- TV announcers (ESPN+): Randy McIlvoy (play-by-play), Shea Walker (analyst), Lainie Fritz (sideline)
- Box Score

Game information

First Quarter

- SLU – 10:31 Nick Kovacs 5 yard pass from Cole Kelley, Mateo Rengifo kick
  SLU 7–0 Drive: 11 plays, 83 yards, 4:29
- UIW – 0:15 Robert Ferrel 7 yard pass from Cameron Ward, Carson Mohr kick
  Tied 7–7 Drive: 9 plays, 74 yards, 2:27

Second Quarter

- SLU – 9:30 Cephus Johnson III 3 yard run, Mateo Rengifo kick failed
  SLU 13–7 Drive: 16 plays, 78 yards, 5:37
- UIW – 8:17 Cameron Ward 1 yard run, Carson Mohr kick
  UIW 14–13 Drive: 7 plays, 97 yards, 1:11
- SLU – 3:10 Mateo Rengifo 20 yard field goal
  SLU 16–14 Drive: 13 plays, 72 yards, 5:07
- UIW – 2:47 Kevin Brown 75 yard run, Carson Mohr kick
  UIW 21–16 Drive: 2 plays, 75 yards, 0:23
- UIW – 1:09 Robert Ferrel 3 yard pass from Cameron Ward, Carson Mohr kick
  UIW 28–16 Drive: 6 plays, 34 yards, 1:02
- UIW – 0:03 Tre Wolf 26 yard pass from Cameron Ward, Carson Mohr kick
  UIW 35–16 Drive: 2 plays, 53 yards, 0:21

Third Quarter

- UIW – 13:32 Ameer King 25 yard pass from Cameron Ward, Carson Mohr kick
  UIW 42–16 Drive: 5 plays, 81 yards, 1:23
- SLU – 9:51 Anthony Spurlock 1 yard pass from Cole Kelley, Mateo Rengifo kick
  UIW 42–23 Drive: 11 plays, 75 yards, 3:41
- UIW – 9:07 Jaelin Campbell 41 yard pass from Cameron Ward, Carson Mohr kick
  UIW 49–23 Drive: 3 plays, 63 yards, 0:36
- UIW – 2:11 Darion Chafin 42 yard pass from Cameron Ward, Carson Mohr kick
  UIW 56–23 Drive: 6 plays, 60 yards, 2:47
- SLU – 0:02 Cole Kelley 1 yard run, Mateo Rengifo kick
  UIW 56–30 Drive: 8 plays, 75 yards, 2:09

Fourth Quarter

- SLU – 8:43 Morgan Ellison 1 yard run, Mateo Rengifo kick
  UIW 56–37 Drive: 10 plays, 69 yards, 2:05
- SLU – 1:14 Connor Briggs 1 yard pass from Cole Kelley, Cole Kelley rush
  UIW 56–45 Drive: 9 plays, 69 yards, 1:38

Passing

- SLU – Cole Kelley 38/60, 431 YDS, 3 TD, 1 INT
- UIW – Cam Ward 26/47, 407 YDS, 6 TD

Rushing

- SLU – Marcus Cooper 10 ATT, 56 YDS
- UIW – Kevin Brown 13 ATT, 190 YDS, 1 TD

Receiving

- SLU – Javon Conner 8 REC, 107 YDS
- UIW – Tre Wolf 8 REC, 183 YDS, 1 TD

=== @ Nicholls ===
Incarnate Word Cardinals at Nicholls Colonels

Quarter	1	2	3	4	Total
No. 13 Cardinals	14	10	7	14	45
No. 17 Colonels	20	35	13	7	75

at Manning Field at John L. Guidry Stadium, Thibodaux, LA

- Date: March 27, 2021
- Game time: 11:00 a.m.
- Game weather: Temperature: 83 • Wind: S 16 mph • Weather: Overcast
- Game attendance: 4,236
- Referee: Dan Lewis
- TV announcers (ESPN+): John Liddle (play-by-play), Gary Reasons (analyst), Lainie Fritz (sideline)
- Box Score

Game information

First Quarter

- NSU – 12:56 Dontaze Costly 22 yard pass from Lindsey Scott Jr., Gavin Lasseigne kick
  NSU 7–0 Drive: 6 plays, 75 yards, 2:04
- UIW – 9:43 Mark Sullivan 4 yard pass from Cam Ward, Carson Mohr kick
  Tied 7–7 Drive: 9 plays, 68 yards, 3:09
- NSU – 7:47 Dontaze Costly 48 yard pass from Lindsey Scott, Gavin Lasseigne kick
  NSU 14–7 Drive: 5 plays, 75 yards, 1:56
- UIW – 5:54 Kevin Brown 22 yard pass from Cameron Ward, Carson Mohr kick
  Tied 14–14 Drive: 5 plays, 85 yards, 1:47
- NSU – 0:40 John Carrington III 7 yard run, Gavin Lasseigne kick failed
  NSU 20–14 Drive: 12 plays, 75 yards, 5:14

Second Quarter

- UIW – 13:36 Carson Mohr 26 yard field goal
  NSU 20–17 Drive: 8 plays, 50 yards, 1:57
- NSU – 13:22 Dontaze Costly 90 yard kickoff return, Gavin Lasseigne kick
  NSU 27–14
- UIW – 10:32 Robert Ferrel 6 yard pass from Cameron Ward, Carson Mohr kick
  NSU 27–24 Drive: 10 plays, 65 yards, 2:50
- NSU – 9:40 Lindsey Scott 19 yard run, Gavin Lasseigne kick
  NSU 34–24 Drive: 3 plays, 80 yards, 0:51
- NSU – 7:46 John Carrington III 14 yard run, Gavin Lasseigne kick
  NSU 41–24 Drive: 3 plays, 40 yards, 1:13
- NSU – 5:00 Al'Dontre Davis 11 yard pass from Lindsey Scott, Gavin Lasseigne kick
  NSU 48–24 Drive: 3 plays, 36 yards, 1:10
- NSU – 0:30 KJ Franklin 16 yard pass from Lindsey Scott, Gavin Lasseigne kick
  NSU 55–24 Drive: 6 plays, 63 yards, 0:40

Third Quarter

- NSU – 10:57 Ronnie Jackson 2 yard run, Gavin Lasseigne kick
  NSU 62–24 Drive: 7 plays, 70 yards, 2:55
- NSU – 9:57 Gavin Lasseigne 31 yard field goal
  NSU 65–24 Drive: 4 plays, 1 yards, 0:53
- NSU – 5:40 Gavin Lasseigne 27 yard field goal
  NSU 68–24 Drive: 4 plays, 3 yards, 1:57
- UIW – 2:27 Jayden Jones 30 yard pass from Cameron Ward, Carson Mohr kick
  NSU 68–31 Drive: 9 plays, 75 yards, 3:13

Fourth Quarter

- UIW – 10:56 Robert Ferrel 22 yard pass from Cameron Ward, Cade Kostroun rush failed
  NSU 68–37 Drive: 9 plays, 85 yards, 3:09
- UIW – 6:43 Kaleb Ducros 23 yard pass from Cameron Ward, Robert Ferrel pass
  NSU 68–45 Drive: 7 plays, 56 yards, 2:14
- NSU – 3:29 Dai'Jean Dixon 3 yard pass from Lindsey Scott, Gunnar Jones kick
  NSU 75–45 Drive: 6 plays, 45 yards, 3:13

Passing

- UIW – Cam Ward 39/65, 470 YDS, 6 TD, 1 INT
- NSU – Lindsey Scott Jr. 17/21, 264 YDS, 5 TD

Rushing

- UIW – Kevin Brown 10 ATT, 48 YDS
- NSU – John Carrington III 13 ATT, 135 YDS, 2 TD

Receiving

- UIW – Robert Ferrel 6 REC, 104 YDS, 2 TD
- NSU – KJ Franklin 5 REC, 81 YDS, 1 TD

=== @ Northwestern State ===
Northwestern State Demons at Incarnate Word Cardinals

Quarter	1	2	3	4	Total
Demons	17	0	9	23	49
No. 19 Cardinals	10	13	7	17	47

at Gayle and Tom Benson Stadium, San Antonio, TX

- Date: April 10, 2021
- Game time: 7:00 p.m.
- Game weather: Temperature: 82 • Wind: NE 9 mph • Weather: Clear
- Game attendance: 1,055
- Referee: Vidal Jones
- TV announcers (ESPN+): Randy McIlvoy (play-by-play), Taylor McHargue (analyst), Lainie Fritz (sideline)
- Box Score

Game information

First Quarter

- NSU – 12:10 Levar Gumms 12 yard pass from Bryce Rivers, Eddie Godina kick
  NSU 7–0 Drive: 7 plays, 75 yards, 2:50
- UIW – 8:39 Robert Ferrel 23 yard run, Carson Mohr kick
  Tied 7–7 Drive: 9 plays, 80 yards, 3:24
- NSU – 5:01 Eddie Godina 30 yard field goal
  NSU 10–7 Drive: 10 plays, 62 yards, 3:38
- UIW – 0:40 Carson Mohr 32 yard field goal
  Tied 10–10 Drive: 8 plays, 45 yards, 3:17
- NSU – 0:00 Scooter Adams 64 yard run, Eddie Godina kick
  NSU 17–10 Drive: 3 plays, 75 yards, 0:40

Second Quarter

- UIW – 7:52 Kevin Brown 1 yard run, Carson Mohr kick failed
  NSU 17–16 Drive: 4 plays, 15 yards, 1:25
- UIW – 5:21 Kevin Brown 3 yard run, Carson Mohr kick
  UIW 23–17 Drive: 5 plays, 63 yards, 1:03

Third Quarter

- NSU – 11:25 Javon Antonio 38 yard pass from Bryce Rivers, Team rush failed
  Tied 23–23 Drive: 6 plays, 75 yards, 2:43
- NSU – 5:32 Eddie Godina 42 yard field goal
  NSU 26–23 Drive: 11 plays, 75 yards, 3:37
- UIW – 4:13 Kevin Brown 53 yard run, Carson Mohr kick
  UIW 30–26 Drive: 5 plays, 64 yards, 1:07

Fourth Quarter

- UIW – 11:47 Robert Ferrel 23 yard pass from Cam Ward, Carson Mohr kick
  UIW 37–26 Drive: 11 plays, 79 yards, 3:25
- NSU – 10:55 Scooter Adams 10 yard run, Eddie Godina kick
  UIW 37–33 Drive: 4 plays, 75 yards, 0:52
- NSU – 7:22 Javon Antonio 14 yard pass from Bryce Rivers, Eddie Godina kick
  NSU 40–37 Drive: 7 plays, 66 yards, 2:10
- UIW – 4:16 Carson Mohr 37 yard field goal
  Tied 40–40 Drive: 9 plays, 68 yards, 2:56
- NSU – 1:28 Scooter Adams 9 yard run, Eddie Godina kick blocked
  NSU 46–40 Drive: 10 plays, 76 yards, 2:42
- UIW – 0:55 Darion Chafin 34 yard pass from Cameron Ward, Carson Mohr kick
  UIW 47–46 Drive: 3 plays, 48 yards, 0:22
- NSU – 0:00 Eddie Godina 32 yard field goal
  NSU 49–47 Drive: 4 plays, 58 yards, 0:55

Passing

- NSU – Bryce Rivers 34/61, 477 YDS, 3 TD, 1 INT
- UIW – Cam Ward 33/59, 431 YDS, 2 TD, 1 INT

Rushing

- NSU – Scooter Adams 20 ATT, 208 YDS, 3 TD
- UIW – Kevin Brown 19 ATT, 160 YDS, 3 TD

Receiving

- NSU – Javon Antonio 11 REC, 192 YDS, 2 TD
- UIW – Robert Ferrel 7 REC, 144 YDS, 1 TD

=== Sam Houston State ===
Sam Houston State Bearkats at Incarnate Word Cardinals

Quarter	1	2	3	4	Total
Bearkats	0	14	14	14	42
Cardinals	0	7	7	0	14

at Gayle and Tom Benson Stadium, San Antonio, TX

- Date: April 17, 2021
- Game time: 11:00 a.m.
- Game weather: Temperature: 65 • Wind: SSW 19 mph • Weather: Partly cloudy
- Game attendance: 743
- Referee: Dan Lewis
- TV: ESPN+
- Box Score

Game information

Second Quarter

- SHSU – 14:52 Jequez Ezzard 21 yard run, Seth Morgan kick
  SHSU 7–0 Drive: 12 plays, 90 yards, 5:21
- SHSU – 7:04 Ife Adeyi 4 yard run, Seth Morgan kick
  SHSU 14–0 Drive: 10 plays, 91 yards, 4:11
- UIW – 0:22 Tre Wolf 1 yard pass from Cameron Ward, Carson Mohr kick
  SHSU 14–7 Drive: 10 plays, 77 yards, 2:39

Third Quarter

- SHSU – 11:02 Eric Schmid 11 yard run, Seth Morgan kick
  SHSU 21–7 Drive: 7 plays, 75 yards, 3:58
- UIW – 7:34 Jayden Jones 8 yard pass from Cameron Ward, Carson Mohr kick
  SHSU 21–14 Drive: 9 plays, 63 yards, 3:17
- SHSU – 6:08 Donovan Williams 4 yard run, Seth Morgan kick
  SHSU 28–14 Drive: 4 plays, 75 yards, 1:26

Fourth Quarter

- SHSU – 8:32 Ramon Jefferson 6 yard run, Seth Morgan kick
  SHSU 35–14 Drive: 13 plays, 84 yards, 6:30
- SHSU – 3:24 Jequez Ezzard 36 yard pass from Eric Schmid, Seth Morgan kick
  SHSU 42–14 Drive: 5 plays, 71 yards, 2:38

Passing

- SHSU – Eric Schmid 25/34, 370 YDS, 1 TD
- UIW – Cam Ward 32/53, 305 YDS, 2 TD

Rushing

- SHSU – Ramon Jefferson 13 ATT, 92 YDS, 1 TD
- UIW – Kevin Brown 9 ATT, 64 YDS

Receiving

- SHSU – Jequez Ezzard 7 REC, 155 YDS, 1 TD
- UIW – Robert Ferrel 9 REC, 98 YDS
