= Cam Ward (American football) =

American football player (born 2002)

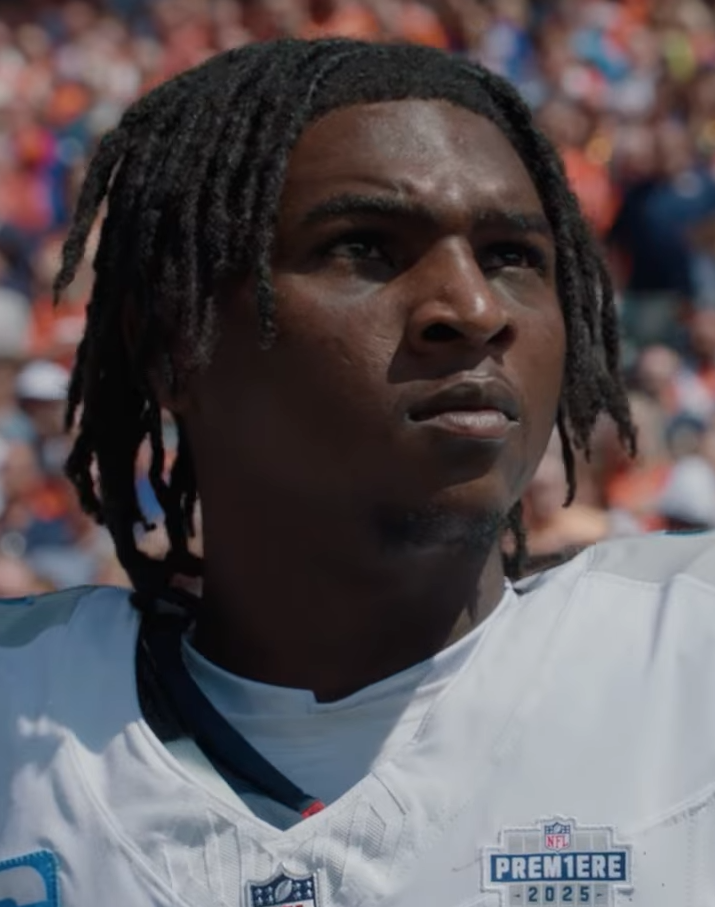
- Ward with the Tennessee Titans in 2025

No. 1 – Tennessee Titans
- Position: Quarterback
- Roster status: Active

Personal information
- Born: May 25, 2002 (age 24); West Columbia, Texas, U.S.
- Listed height: 6 ft 2 in (1.88 m)
- Listed weight: 219 lb (99 kg)

Career information
- High school: Columbia (West Columbia)
- College: Incarnate Word (2020–2021); Washington State (2022–2023); Miami (FL) (2024)
- NFL draft: 2025: 1st round, 1st overall pick

Career history
- Tennessee Titans (2025–present)

Awards and highlights
- Davey O'Brien Award (2024); Manning Award (2024); NCAA passing touchdowns leader (2024); Consensus All-American (2024); ACC Player of the Year (2024); First-team All-ACC (2024); SLC Offensive Player of the Year (2021); Jerry Rice Award (2020); SLC Freshman of the Year (2020)

Career NFL statistics as of Week 10, 2026
- Passing attempts: 827
- Passing completions: 506
- Completion percentage: 61.2%
- TD–INT: 23–13
- Passing yards: 4,883
- Passer rating: 80.4
- Rushing yards: 310
- Rushing touchdowns: 4
- Stats at Pro Football Reference

Cameron Anthony Ward (born May 25, 2002) is an American professional football quarterback for the Tennessee Titans of the National Football League (NFL). He played college football for the Incarnate Word Cardinals, Washington State Cougars, and Miami Hurricanes, winning the 2020 Jerry Rice Award with Incarnate Word and the 2024 Davey O'Brien and Manning awards with Miami. Ward was selected by the Titans first overall in the 2025 NFL draft.

== Early life ==
Cameron Anthony Ward was born on May 25, 2002, in West Columbia, Texas. His father, Calvin, works in the energy industry, and his mother, Patrice, is a special education teacher and former high school basketball coach. Ward has three siblings.

Ward attended Columbia High School and played basketball and football. As a junior, he completed 72 of 124 passes for 1,070 yards and seven touchdowns for the Columbia football team. As a senior, Ward averaged only 12 pass attempts per game due to playing in Columbia's Wing T offense. He threw for just 948 yards and 8 touchdowns during his last year in high school. Ward committed to play at the University of the Incarnate Word in San Antonio, one of only two schools to offer Ward a scholarship for that season, the other being Texas Southern University. Some FBS teams showed interest in Ward, but ultimately chose not to offer him a scholarship as they were already committed to their pursuit of higher-ranked quarterback prospects. Due to the system that Ward played under, few knew who he was, and Ward entered college as a zero-star recruit or as an unknown and unlisted recruit on all major recruiting sites as a result.

== College career ==
=== Incarnate Word (2020–2021) ===
Ward began his collegiate career at Incarnate Word. He was named the Cardinals' starting quarterback going into his freshman season, which was played in the spring after being postponed due to the COVID-19 pandemic.

Ward threw for 2,260 yards and an FCS-leading 24 touchdowns against four interceptions with two rushing touchdowns in six games during the shortened 2020–21 FCS season, and he won the Jerry Rice Award as the most outstanding freshman in the NCAA Division I Football Championship Subdivision. Ward passed for 4,648 yards and 47 touchdowns with 10 interceptions as a sophomore and was named the Southland Conference Offensive Player of the Year. After the end of the season, Ward announced that he would be entering the NCAA transfer portal.

=== Washington State (2022–2023) ===
Ward announced his commitment to transfer to Washington State, where his Incarnate Word head Coach Eric Morris had just been hired as offensive coordinator, on January 10, 2022. Ward enrolled at the school for the second semester of his sophomore year and was named the starting quarterback for the 2022 season during the Cougars' spring practices. He completed 64.4% of his passes for 3,231 yards, 23 touchdowns, and nine interceptions while also rushing for five touchdowns.

In his second season with Washington State, Ward led the Cougars to a 4-0 start and #13 ranking in the AP Top 25 Poll. Ward went on to finish the season having completed 66.6% of his passes for 3,573 passing yards, 25 touchdowns, and seven interceptions while also rushing for eight touchdowns. Ward's development in his two years at Washington State led to his being considered one of the top transfer portal candidates for 2024. Ward entered the transfer portal on December 1, 2023. He graduated from WSU during their December commencement.

=== Miami (2024) ===
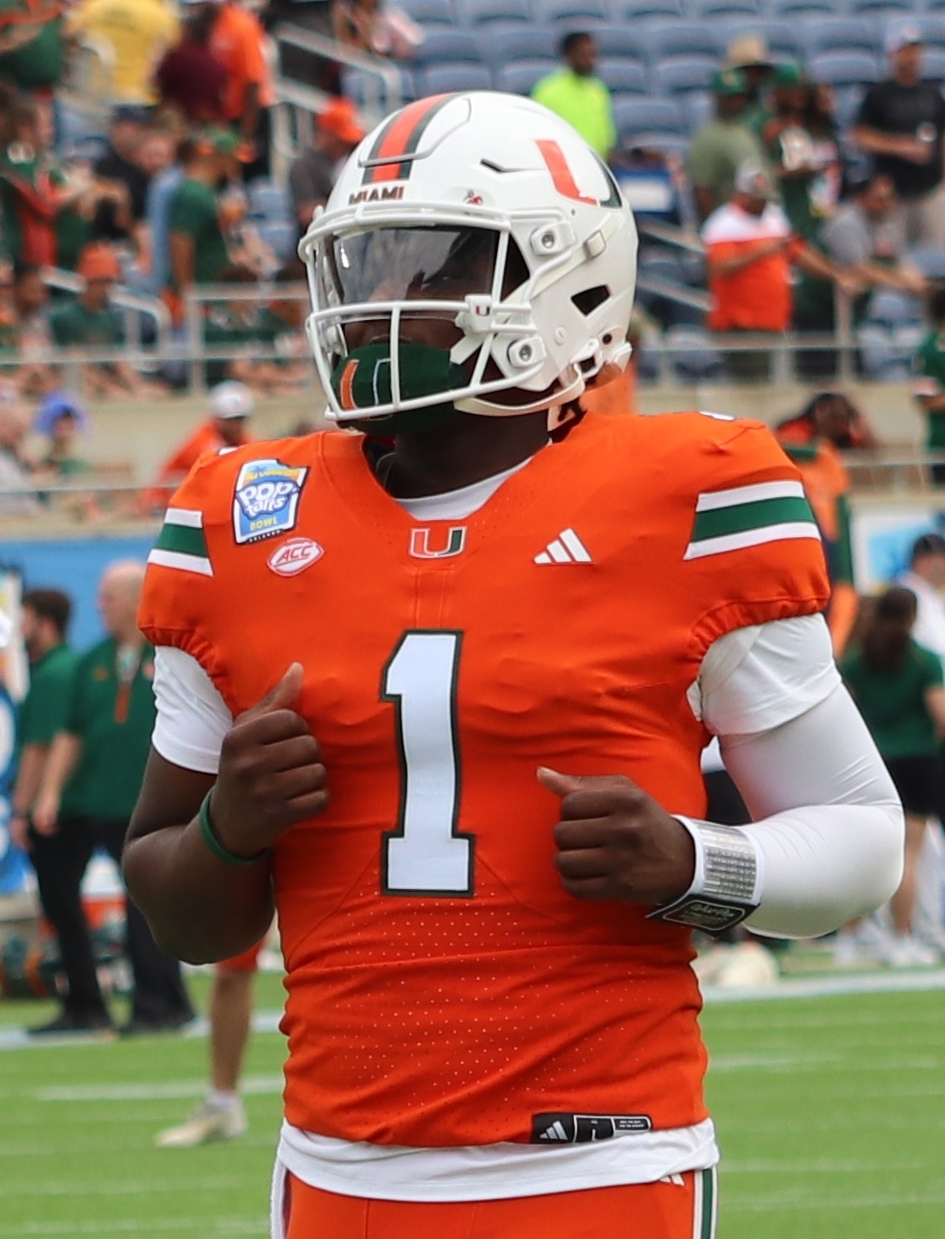
Ward with the Miami Hurricanes playing in the 2024 Pop-Tarts Bowl

Ward initially declared for the 2024 NFL draft following the 2023 season, but later decided to use his remaining eligibility to transfer to Miami for the 2024 season. This decision was influenced by the opportunity to improve his draft stock and take advantage of the NIL (Name, Image, and Likeness) rules in college football. Ward announced his commitment to transfer to Miami on January 13, 2024. During the 2024 season, Ward led Miami to a 10–2 record. Miami lost a close shootout at Syracuse during the final week of the season by a score of 42–38. The loss eliminated Miami from the ACC Championship Game, allowing Clemson to make it into the conference championship game instead. Miami finished 13th in the final CFP rankings, and they were the second team out of the playoffs. Ward was named the ACC Player of the Year, voted the Davey O'Brien and Manning Award winner as the top college football quarterback, and finished fourth in Heisman Trophy voting.

The Hurricanes matched up with the Iowa State Cyclones in the 2024 Pop-Tarts Bowl. Playing in just the first half, Ward threw for three touchdowns, setting the career combined FCS (71) and FBS (87) record with 158. He opted to not play in the second half, in which Miami was outscored by Iowa State, ultimately losing 42–41. Ward's decision received some criticism from those who thought that he should have stuck through the game.

== Professional career ==
Pre-draft measurables
Height	Weight	Arm length	Hand span	Wingspan
6 ft 1 5/8 in (1.87 m)	219 lb (99 kg)	30 5/8 in (0.78 m)	9 in (0.23 m)	6 ft 3 3/4 in (1.92 m)
All values from NFL Combine

Ward was selected first overall by the Tennessee Titans in the 2025 NFL draft, becoming the first zero-star recruit to be selected first overall in the 21st century. Although his college uniform number 1 was retired by the Titans in honor of Warren Moon, Ward was granted permission to wear it during his introductory press conference.

=== 2025 season ===
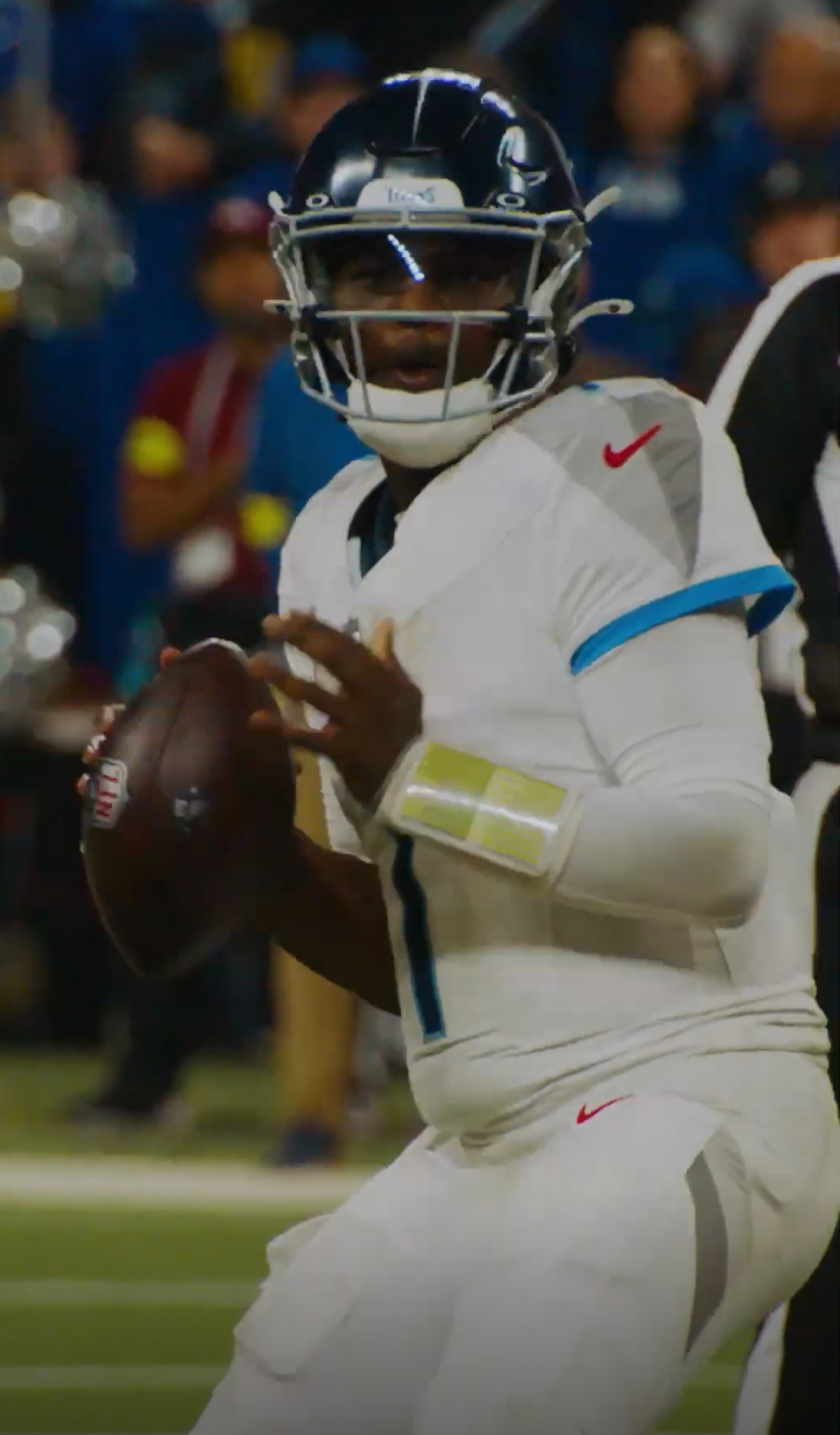
Ward in 2025

In his NFL debut against the Denver Broncos, Ward completed 12 of 28 passes for 112 yards with no touchdowns and no interceptions. He was sacked six times, including a game losing fumble as the Titans lost on the road 20–12. During Week 5, in a comeback win against the Arizona Cardinals, Ward threw 39 passes, completing 21 of them, for a career high 265 yards, no touchdowns, and an interception. He led a game winning drive with under two minutes from his own 18-yard line, down by two. The Titans drove down to the four-yard line, and Joey Slye kicked a game winning 29-yard field goal, as the Titans narrowly won on the road 22–21 for their first win of the season and Ward's first career win.

Ward's second career win came in Week 14 against the Cleveland Browns, where the Titans narrowly won 31–29. Ward threw for 117 passing yards, 2 passing touchdowns, 1 interception on 14/28 passing attempts. During the regular season finale against the Jacksonville Jaguars, Ward suffered a shoulder injury after rushing for a seven-yard touchdown; Tennessee lost on the road, 41–7.

Starting all 17 games, Ward ended his rookie season with a 3–14 record. He led the league in sacks taken (55, tied with Geno Smith) and fumbles (11), statistics compounded by poor offensive line play and his tendency to hold the ball for too long. Head coach Brian Callahan also lost play-calling duties before being fired, which Titans beat writer Buck Reising said forced Ward to "undergo significant upheaval during the most critical stretch of his development".

=== 2026 season ===
Ahead of 2026, new Titans head coach Robert Saleh hired Brian Daboll as the offensive coordinator. The new staff emphasized helping Ward be more consistent by completing the "every day, monotonous plays" and to be "aggressive but not reckless".

The offense remained inconsistent at the start of the season. After throwing for just 140 yards in the season-opening loss to the New York Jets, Ward ran for two touchdowns and threw for another the following week against the Philadelphia Eagles. In Week 3, the Titans had just 54 yards and punted on all five drives in the first half before rallying in the second, but still lost 12–7 to the New York Giants when Ward was intercepted late. Saleh surmised after the game that Ward had "some PTSD" from being sacked so often in 2025. From Weeks 3 through 7, he threw an interception in every game.

In Week 8 against the Cincinnati Bengals, Ward threw for 304 yards and two touchdowns while rushing for 41 yards. He was the first Titans quarterback to record at least 300 passing yards and two passing touchdowns without being intercepted since Ryan Fitzpatrick in 2013. Despite his performance, Tennessee lost 43–36.

== Career statistics ==
Legend
	Led the league
**Bold**	Career high

=== NFL ===
Year	Team	Games			Passing									Rushing					Sacks		Fumbles	
Year	Team	GP	GS	Record	Cmp	Att	Pct	Yds	Y/A	Lng	TD	Int	Rtg	Att	Yds	Y/A	Lng	TD	Sck	SckY	Fum	Lost
2025	TEN	17	17	**3–14**	**323**	**540**	59.8	**3,169**	5.9	**47**	**15**	**7**	**80.2**	**39**	**159**	4.1	20	**2**	**55**	**410**	**11** (Note: Tied with Sam Darnold and Baker Mayfield.)	**7**
2026	TEN	9	9	1–8	183	287	**63.8**	1,714	**6.0**	41	8	6	80.7	29	151	**5.2**	**26**	**2**	14	108	3	1
Career		26	26	4–22	506	827	61.2	4,883	5.9	47	22	13	80.4	68	310	4.6	26	4	69	518	14	7

=== College ===
Legend
Led the FBS
School record

Year	Team	Games			Passing								Rushing			
Year	Team	GP	GS	Record	Cmp	Att	Pct	Yds	Avg	TD	Int	Rtg	Att	Yds	Avg	TD
2020	Incarnate Word	6	6	3–3	183	303	60.4	2,260	7.5	24	4	146.5	38	2	0.1	2
2021	Incarnate Word	13	13	**10–3**	**384**	**590**	65.1	**4,648**	7.9	**47**	**10**	154.2	74	65	0.9	1
2022	Washington State	13	13	7–6	320	497	64.4	3,231	6.5	23	9	130.6	107	58	0.5	5
2023	Washington State	12	12	5–7	323	485	66.6	3,735	7.7	25	7	145.4	**120**	144	1.2	**8**
2024	Miami	13	13	**10–3**	305	454	**67.2**	4,313	**9.5**	39	7	**172.2**	60	**204**	**3.4**	4
Career		57	57	35–22	1,515	2,329	65.0	18,137	7.8	158	37	149.9	402	469	1.2	20

== Career highlights ==
College

- Davey O'Brien Award (2024)
- Manning Award (2024)
- Consensus All-American (2024)
- NCAA passing touchdowns leader (2024)
- ACC Player of the Year (2024)
- First-team All-ACC (2024)
- SLC Offensive Player of the Year (2021)
- Jerry Rice Award (2020)
- SLC Freshman of the Year (2020)
- Second-team All-SLC (2021)
- Third-team All-SLC (2020)

== Personal life ==
His younger maternal cousin is former Baylor Bears and Virginia Tech Hokies quarterback Kyron Drones. Ward's older cousins are safety Quandre Diggs and cornerback Quentin Jammer.

Ward was featured in the third season of the Netflix series Quarterback, which premiered in July 2026.
