= J. W. Cole =

American football player and coach (1927–2014)

Biographical details
- Born: August 14, 1927; Hollis, Oklahoma, U.S.
- Died: March 1, 2014 (aged 86); Ardmore, Oklahoma, U.S.

Playing career
- 1949–1950: Oklahoma
- Position: Tackle

Coaching career (HC unless noted)
- 1951–1962: Oklahoma (assistant freshmen)
- 1954–1967: SW Oklahoma State (line)
- 1958–1963: SW Oklahoma State
- ?–1967: NW Oklahoma State (line)
- 1968–1971: NW Oklahoma State

Head coaching record
- Overall: 33–62–5

Accomplishments and honors

Championships
- National (1950)

James William Cole (August 14, 1927 – March 1, 2014) was an American football coach and player. As a college football player at the University of Oklahoma, he was a member of teams that won 31 consecutive games under head coach Bud Wilkinson. Cole served as the head football coach at Southwestern Oklahoma State University from 1958 to 1963 and Northwestern Oklahoma State University from 1968 to 1971.

Cole played football at Hollis High School in Hollis, Oklahoma before graduating 1947. At Oklahoma, he played as a tackle. Following his graduation from Oklahoma, Cole assisted with coaching the freshman football team at his alma mater. After serving in the military, he was appointed line coach at Southwestern Oklahoma State in June 1954, serving for four seasons under Joe Metcalf before succeeding him as head coach in January 1958.

== Head coaching record ==
Year	Team	Overall	Conference	Standing
Southwestern Oklahoma State Bulldogs (Oklahoma Collegiate Conference) (1958–1963)
1958	Southwestern Oklahoma State	2–6–1	2–4	T–5th
1959	Southwestern Oklahoma State	3–6–1	3–3	4th
1960	Southwestern Oklahoma State	1–9	1–5	6th
1961	Southwestern Oklahoma State	2–8	2–5	7th
1962	Southwestern Oklahoma State	6–4	5–2	3rd
1963	Southwestern Oklahoma State	3–7	1–6	8th
Southwestern Oklahoma State:		17–40–2	14–25	
Northwestern Oklahoma State Rangers (Oklahoma Collegiate Conference) (1968–1971)
1968	Northwestern Oklahoma State	1–7–2	1–5–1	7th
1969	Northwestern Oklahoma State	4–6	2–5	6th
1970	Northwestern Oklahoma State	4–5–1	2–5–1	6th
1971	Northwestern Oklahoma State	7–4	5–3	T–4th
Northwestern Oklahoma State:		16–22–3	10–18–2	
Total:		33–62–5		
