= Paul Sharp =

Paul Sharp may refer to:

- Paul Sharp (American football) (1952–2012), American college football coach
- Paul F. Sharp (1918–2009), professor and college administrator
- Paul M. Sharp (born 1957), professor of genetics at the University of Edinburgh
