= 1996 Southwestern Oklahoma State Bulldogs football team =

American college football season

1996 Southwestern Oklahoma State Bulldogs football

NAIA Division I national champion OIC co-champion

NAIA Division I Championship Game, W 33–31 vs. Montana Tech
- Conference: Oklahoma Intercollegiate Conference
- Record: 9–3 (4–1 OIC)
- Head coach: Paul Sharp (11th season)
- Home stadium: Milam Stadium

1996 Oklahoma Intercollegiate Conference football standings
	Conf.			Overall
Team	W		L	W		L
No. 1 SW Oklahoma State +^	4	–	1	9	–	3
No. 3 NW Oklahoma State +^	4	–	1	8	–	3
Langston	3	–	2	6	–	4
No. 5 SE Oklahoma State	3	–	2	6	–	4
East Central	1	–	4	3	–	7
Panhandle State	0	–	5	0	–	10
Northeastern State *	0	–	0	3	–	8
+ – Conference co-champions; ^ – NAIA Division I playoff participant * – ineligible for conference title; Rankings from NAIA Division I poll

The 1996 Southwestern Oklahoma State Bulldogs football team represented Southwestern Oklahoma State University as a member of the Oklahoma Intercollegiate Conference (OIC) during the 1996 NAIA Division I football season. Led by 11th-year head coach Paul Sharp, the Bulldogs compiled an overall record of 9–3 with a mark of 4–1 in conference play, and sharing the OIC title with Northwestern Oklahoma State. Southwestern Oklahoma State advanced to the NAIA Division I playoffs, where the Bulldogs defeated Northwestern Oklahoma State in the semifinals and Montana Tech in the championship game.

== Schedule ==
Date	Opponent	Site	Result	Attendance	Source
September 14	Central Oklahoma*	Milam Stadium; Weatherford, OK	L 14–23	5,500	
September 21	at West Texas A&M*	Kimbrough Memorial Stadium; Canyon, TX	W 31–21		
September 28	at Midwestern State*	Memorial Stadium; Wichita Falls, TX	W 31–15	1,800	
October 5	Panhandle State^{†}	Milam Stadium; Weatherford, OK	W 29–10		
October 12	at Harding*	Alumni Stadium; Searcy, AR	L 23–35		
October 19	at Southeastern Oklahoma State	Laird Field; Durant, OK	W 19–13		
October 26	East Central (OK)	Milam Stadium; Weatherford, OK	W 19–15		
November 2	at Langston	Anderson Field; Langston, OK	L 6–20		
November 9	at Northeastern State	Gable Field; Tahlequah, OK	W 7–3		
November 14	Northwestern Oklahoma State	Milam Stadium; Weatherford, OK	W 16–10	8,000	
November 23	Northwestern Oklahoma State*	Milam Stadium; Weatherford, OK (NAIA Division I Semifinal)	W 17–7	4,000	
December 7	Montana Tech*	Milam Stadium; Weatherford, OK (NAIA Division I Championship Game)	W 33–31	4,500	
*Non-conference game; ^{†}Homecoming
