= Bob Mazie =

American football coach

Biographical details
- Born: March 29, 1938; Pittsburgh, Pennsylvania, U.S.
- Died: January 5, 2017 (aged 78)

Playing career
- 1953–1956: Waynesburg
- 1961–1962: Wheeling Ironmen

Coaching career (HC unless noted)

Football
- 1966–1967: SW Oklahoma State (assistant)
- 1968–1971: Southern Illinois (OL)
- 1972: Kutztown
- 1973–1975: Dayton (OC)
- 1976–1977: SW Oklahoma State (DC)
- 1978–1985: SW Oklahoma State

Head coaching record
- Overall: 46–40–2

Accomplishments and honors

Championships
- 2 OIC (1980, 1985)

Awards
- OIC Coach of the Year (1985)

Bob Mazie (March 29, 1938 – January 5, 2017) was an American football coach. He was the head football coach at Kutztown University of Pennsylvania for one season in 1972.

Mazie then served as the head football coach at Southwestern Oklahoma State University from 1978 to 1985. During his time at Southwestern Oklahoma State, he coached two future National Football League (NFL) coaches, Rex Ryan and Rob Ryan.

== Head coaching record ==
=== College ===
Year	Team	Overall	Conference	Standing	Bowl/playoffs
Kutztown Golden Bears (Pennsylvania State Athletic Conference) (1972)
1972	Kutztown	6–3	3–3	4th	
Kutztown:		6–3	3–3		
Southwestern Oklahoma State Bulldogs (Oklahoma Intercollegiate Conference) (1978–1985)
1978	Southwestern Oklahoma State	3–5–1	1–2–1	T–3rd	
1979	Southwestern Oklahoma State	7–2	3–1	2nd	
1980	Southwestern Oklahoma State	7–4	3–1	T–1st	
1981	Southwestern Oklahoma State	3–8	2–2	3rd	
1982	Southwestern Oklahoma State	7–3	3–1	2nd	
1983	Southwestern Oklahoma State	3–6	3–1	T–2nd	
1984	Southwestern Oklahoma State	4–6	1–3	4th	
1985	Southwestern Oklahoma State	6–3–1	3–1	T–1st	
Southwestern Oklahoma State:		40–37–2	19–12–1		
Total:		46–40–2			
