= Paul Sharp (American football) =

American football coach (1952–2012)

Biographical details
- Born: May 11, 1952
- Died: October 26, 2012 (aged 60)

Playing career

Football
- c. 1972: Ouachita Baptist

Baseball
- c. 1972: Ouachita Baptist

Coaching career (HC unless noted)

Football
- 1974–1978: Ouachita Baptist (DL/OL)
- 1979–1981: Central Arkansas (DC)
- 1982–1985: Lamar (DC)
- 1986–2004: Southwestern Oklahoma State

Head coaching record
- Overall: 93–100–1
- Tournaments: 2–0 (NAIA D-I playoffs)

Accomplishments and honors

Championships
- 1 NAIA Division I (1996); 2 OIC (1992, 1996); LSC North Division (1997)

Awards
- NAIA Division I Coach of the Year (1996)

Paul Dewey Sharp (May 11, 1952 – October 26, 2012) was an American college football coach. He served as the head football coach at Southwestern Oklahoma State University from 1986 to 2004, compiling a record of 93–100–1. Sharp led the Southwestern Oklahoma State Bulldogs to an NAIA Division I Football National Championship in 1996.

Sharp was born on May 11, 1952. A native of Douglas, Arizona, he played football at Ouachita Baptist University in Arkadelphia, Arkansas. He died of attack on October 26, 2012.

== Head coaching record ==
Year	Team	Overall	Conference	Standing	Bowl/playoffs
Southwestern Oklahoma State Bulldogs (Oklahoma Intercollegiate Conference) (1986–1996)
1986	Southwestern Oklahoma State	4–6	0–4	5th	
1987	Southwestern Oklahoma State	3–7	0–4	5th	
1988	Southwestern Oklahoma State	6–4	2–2	T–2nd	
1989	Southwestern Oklahoma State	6–4	2–2	2nd	
1990	Southwestern Oklahoma State	5–5	1–3	4th	
1991	Southwestern Oklahoma State	6–4–1	3–2	3rd	
1992	Southwestern Oklahoma State	8–2	4–1	T–1st	
1993	Southwestern Oklahoma State	6–4	2–3	T–4th	
1994	Southwestern Oklahoma State	2–7	1–4	5th	
1995	Southwestern Oklahoma State	5–5	2–3	T–4th	
1996	Southwestern Oklahoma State	9–3	4–1	T–1st	W NAIA Division I Championship
Southwestern Oklahoma State Bulldogs (Lone Star Conference) (1997–2004)
1997	Southwestern Oklahoma State	5–5	5–4 / 5–1	T–5th / T–1st (North)	
1998	Southwestern Oklahoma State	0–10	0–9 / 0–9	15th / 7th (North)	
1999	Southwestern Oklahoma State	5–5	4–5 / 4–5	T–8th / 4th (North)	
2000	Southwestern Oklahoma State	6–4	4–4 / 2–3	T–7th / T–4th (North)	
2001	Southwestern Oklahoma State	4–6	2–6 / 2–3	T–10th / T–4th (North)	
2002	Southwestern Oklahoma State	7–4	5–3 / 3–2	T–5th / T–2nd (North)	
2003	Southwestern Oklahoma State	5–6	2–6 / 1–4	T–10th / 6th (North)	
2004	Southwestern Oklahoma State	1–9	1–8 / 1–4	12th / 5th (North)	
Southwestern Oklahoma State:		93–100–1	44–74		
Total:		93–100–1			
National championship Conference title Conference division title or championship game berth
