= Andrew Rice (American football) =

American football coach (born c. 1989)

Current position
- Title: Head coach
- Team: Southwestern Oklahoma State
- Conference: GAC
- Record: 9–13

Biographical details
- Born: c. 1989 (age 36–37); Owasso, Oklahoma, U.S.
- Education: Northeastern State University (2012)

Playing career
- 2008–2011: Northeastern State
- Position: Quarterback

Coaching career (HC unless noted)
- 2012: Bixby HS (OK) (RB)
- 2013: Charles Page HS (OK) (RB)
- 2014: Charles Page HS (OK) (OC/QB)
- 2015–2016: Bartlesville HS (OK) (OC/QB)
- 2017: Miami HS (OK)
- 2018–2019: NE Oklahoma A&M (OC)
- 2020–2021: Central Oklahoma (WR)
- 2022–2023: Southern Arkansas (OC/QB)
- 2024–present: Southwestern Oklahoma State

Head coaching record
- Overall: 9–13 (college); 1–9 (high school)

Andrew Rice (born c. 1989) is an American college football coach. He is the head football coach for Southwestern Oklahoma State University, a position he has held since 2024. He was the head football coach for Miami High School in Miami, Oklahoma, in 2017. He also coached for Bixby High School, Charles Page High School, Bartlesville High School, Northeastern Oklahoma A&M, Central Oklahoma, and Southern Arkansas. He played college football for Northeastern State as a quarterback.

== Head coaching record ==
=== College ===
Year	Team	Overall	Conference	Standing	Bowl/playoffs
Southwestern Oklahoma State Bulldogs (Great American Conference) (2024–present)
2024	Southwestern Oklahoma State	3–8	3–8	T–9th	
2025	Southwestern Oklahoma State	6–5	6–5	T–6th	
2026	Southwestern Oklahoma State	0–0	0–0		
Southwestern Oklahoma State:		9–13	9–13		
Total:		9–13			

=== High school ===
Year	Team	Overall	Conference	Standing	Bowl/playoffs
Miami Wardogs () (2017)
2017	Miami	1–9	1–6	8th	
Miami:		1–9	1–6		
Total:		1–9			
