= John Lance (basketball) =

American football and basketball coach (1897–1981)

Biographical details
- Born: October 29, 1897; Pittsburg, Kansas, U.S.
- Died: September 10, 1981 (aged 83)

Playing career

Football
- 1914–1917: Pittsburg State

Coaching career (HC unless noted)

Football
- 1918–1921: Southwestern Normal / State (OK)

Basketball
- 1918–1922: Southwestern Normal / State (OK)
- 1922–1934: Pittsburg State
- 1935–1963: Pittsburg State

Head coaching record
- Overall: 643–345 (basketball)

John F. Lance (October 29, 1897 – September 10, 1981) was a college basketball coach. He served as the head basketball coach at Southwestern Oklahoma State University from 1918 to 1921 and as the head basketball coach at Pittsburg State University from 1922 to 1963.

Lance's greatest coaching feats occurred on the hardwood, where he amassed a career record of 643 wins and 345 losses serving as the head men's basketball coach at Southwestern Oklahoma State (1918–1921) and at Pittsburg State University in Pittsburg, Kansas (1922–1934, 1935–1963). He became just the fifth coach in college basketball history to reach 600 career wins, joining the ranks of Ed Diddle, Hank Iba, Adolph Rupp, and Phog Allen. He led Pittsburg State to a 47-game win streak from 1929 to 1932, a record that stood for nearly a quarter of a century until the Bill Russell-led San Francisco Dons eclipsed that mark from 1955 to 1957.
