= Southwestern Oklahoma State Bulldogs football =

College football team in NCAA Division II

- First season: 1905; 121 years ago
- Athletic director: Todd Helton
- Head coach: Andrew Rice; 1st season, 0–0 (–)
- Location: Weatherford, Oklahoma
- Stadium: Milam Stadium (capacity: 8,600)
- NCAA division: Division II
- Conference: Great American Conference
- Colors: Navy blue and white
- All-time record: 472–530–36 (.472)

NAIA national championships
- NAIA Division I: 1996

Conference championships
- OIC I: 1926 OCAC: 1932, 1933, 1950, 1954, 1955, 1957, 1968, 1969, 1970, 1971 OIC II: 1974, 1977, 1980, 1985, 1992, 1996
- Website: swosuathletics.com/football

The Southwestern Oklahoma State Bulldogs football program represents Southwestern Oklahoma State University in college football and competes in the Division II level of the National Collegiate Athletic Association (NCAA). In 2011, SWOSU became a member of the Great American Conference. Prior to this, Southwestern Oklahoma State was a member of the Lone Star Conference from 1998 to 2010. SWOSU's home games are played at Milam in Weatherford, Oklahoma.

The programs maintains an all time record of 472–530–36 (.472). The team is led by head coach Andrew Rice who was hired by the university in December 2023.

== Conference affiliations ==
- Oklahoma Intercollegiate Conference I (1914–1928)
- Oklahoma Collegiate Athletic Conference (1929–1973)
- Oklahoma Intercollegiate Conference II (1974–1996)
- Lone Star Conference (1997–2010)
- Great American Conference (2011–present)

== Stadium ==
The Bulldogs have played their home games at Milam Stadium since 1936. The current capacity of the stadium is at 8,600.

== Championships ==
=== National championships ===
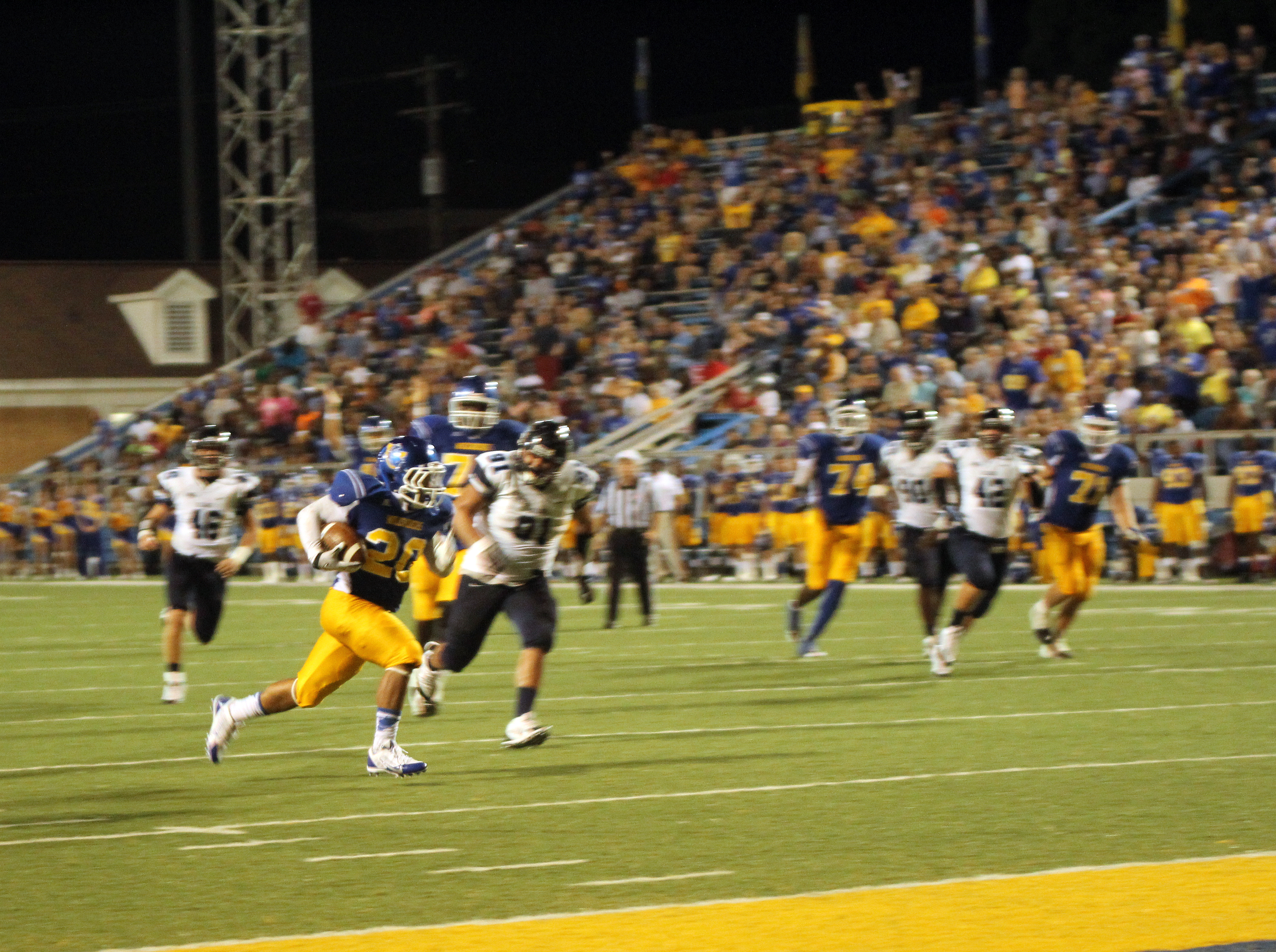
Southwestern Oklahoma State (in white) v Southern Arkansas game in 2013

Season	Coach	Selectors	Record	Bowl
1996	Paul Sharp	NAIA Playoffs	9–3	Won NAIA Division I Championship

=== Conference championships ===
The Bulldogs have won 17 conference championships in 1926, 1932, 1933, 1950, 1954, 1955, 1957, 1968, 1969, 1970, 1971, 1974, 1977, 1980, 1985, 1992, 1996.

== Postseason appearances ==
=== NAIA Division I ===
The Bulldogs made three appearances in the NAIA Division I playoffs, with a combined record of 3–2 and one national championship.

Year	Round	Opponent	Result
1977	Semifinals; National Championship	Kearney State; Abilene Christian	W, 21–7; L, 7–24
1992	Quarterfinals	Central Arkansas	L, 2–14
1996	Semifinals; National Championship	NW Oklahoma State; Montana Tech	W, 17–7; W, 33–31

== List of head coaches ==
- Len Whitcomb (1905–1906)
- Edward J. Hickox (1907)
- No team (1908)
- Adolph Schulz (1909)
- Moses Gaskell (1910–1912)
- Howard Cross (1913)
- Claude Reeds (1914–1915)
- Samuel D. Burton (1916–1917)
- John Lance (1918–1921)
- Carl M. Voyles (1922–1924)
- Dewey Luster (1925)
- Joe Milam (1926–1931)
- Rankin Williams (1932–1937)
- Jake Spann (1938–1941)
- No team (1942–1945)
- Jake Spann (1946–1948)
- Keith Ransport (1949–1950)
- W. C. Whiteside (1951)
- Joe Metcalf (1952–1957)
- J. W. Cole (1958–1963)
- Otis Delaporte (1964–1977)
- Bob Mazie (1978–1985)
- Paul Sharp (1986–2004)
- Ryan Held (2005–2008)
- Dan Cocannouer (2009–2017)
- Chet Pobolish (2018–2021)
- Josh Kirkland (2022)
- Ruzzell McCoy (2023) - interim
- Andrew Rice (2024–present)
