= Chet Pobolish =

American football coach (born c. 1976)

Current position
- Title: Head coach
- Team: Arkansas City HS (KS)
- Record: 5–22

Biographical details
- Born: c. 1976 (age 49–50); Moundsville, West Virginia, U.S.
- Education: Emporia State University (2000)

Playing career
- 1995–1998: Emporia State
- Position: Wide receiver

Coaching career (HC unless noted)
- 1999–2003: Emporia State (ST/WR)
- 2004–2006: Emporia State (QB)
- 2007–2011: Delta State (ST/WR)
- 2012–2013: Southeastern Louisiana (ST/WR)
- 2014–2015: Southeastern Louisiana (OC/WR)
- 2016: Southeastern Louisiana (AHC/ST/WR)
- 2017: Missouri Western (OC/QB)
- 2018–2021: Southwestern Oklahoma State
- 2022: Reinhardt (AHC/OC)
- 2023–present: Arkansas City HS (KS)

Head coaching record
- Overall: 6–27 (college); 5–22 (high school)

Accomplishments and honors

Awards
- 4× All-MIAA (1995–1998)

Chet Pobolish (born c. 1976) is an American college football coach. He is the head football coach for Arkansas City High School, a position he has held since 2023. He was the head football coach for Southwestern Oklahoma State University from 2018 to 2021. He also coached for Emporia State, Delta State, Southeastern Louisiana, Missouri Western, and Reinhardt. He played college football for Emporia State as a wide receiver.

== Head coaching record ==
=== College ===
Year	Team	Overall	Conference	Standing	Bowl/playoffs
Southwestern Oklahoma State Bulldogs (Great American Conference) (2018–2021)
2018	Southwestern Oklahoma State	3–8	3–8	T–9th	
2019	Southwestern Oklahoma State	3–8	3–8	T–8th	
2020–21	No team—COVID-19				
2021	Southwestern Oklahoma State	0–11	0–11	12th	
Southwestern Oklahoma State:		6–27	6–27		
Total:		6–27			

=== High school ===
Year	Team	Overall	Conference	Standing	Bowl/playoffs
Arkansas City Bulldogs () (2023–present)
2023	Arkansas City	1–8			
2024	Arkansas City	2–7			
2025	Arkansas City	2–7			
Arkansas City:		5–22			
Total:		5–22			
