= Jordan Davis (American football coach) =

American football coach (born 1992)

Current position
- Title: Offensive coordinator & quarterbacks coach
- Team: East Carolina
- Conference: AAC

Biographical details
- Born: June 9, 1992 (age 33); Arlington, Texas, U.S.

Playing career
- 2010: Southwestern Oklahoma State
- 2011–2013: Texas Tech
- Position: Wide receiver

Coaching career (HC unless noted)
- 2016–2017: Texas Tech (GA)
- 2018–2019: Incarnate Word (WR)
- 2020–2021: Incarnate Word (AHC/WR)
- 2022: Washington State (OA)
- 2023–2025: North Texas (OC/WR)
- 2026–present: East Carolina (OC/QB)

Jordan Davis (born June 9, 1992) is an American college football coach who is the offensive coordinator for East Carolina Pirates football team.

== Playing career ==
Davis grew up in Arlington, Texas and attended Arlington High School. He played both wide receiver and safety for the football team and was named All-District 5A-4 on defense as a junior and senior.

Davis began his college football career at Southwestern Oklahoma State. He caught 20 passes for 225 yards and a team-leading three touchdowns in 11 games as a freshman. Following the end of the season Davis transferred to Texas Tech University and joined the Red Raiders as a walk-on. He had seven receptions for 58 yards in his first season at Texas Tech and earned a scholarship at the end of the year. Davis's receivers coach as a senior was Eric Morris.

== Coaching career ==
Davis began his coaching career as a graduate assistant at Texas Tech in 2016. He was hired by Morris as the wide receivers coach at the University of the Incarnate Word (UIW) in 2018 as part of Morris's inaugural staff. Davis was named the Cardinals' associate head coach in addition to wide receivers coach after two seasons at UIW. He was hired as an offensive analyst at Washington State in 2022 shortly after Morris was hired as the Cougars' offensive coordinator. Davis followed Morris again after he was hired as the head coach at North Texas and was named offensive coordinator and wide receivers coach.
