= Milam Stadium =

College football stadium in Weatherford, Oklahoma

- Fast Lane Field
- Interactive map of Milam Stadium
- Location: Weatherford, Oklahoma 74467
- Coordinates: 35.53598°N 98.71082°W
- Owner: Southwestern Oklahoma State University
- Operator: Southwestern Oklahoma State University
- Capacity: 8,600
- Surface: AstroTurf

Construction
- Opened: 1936

Tenant
- Southwestern Oklahoma State Bulldogs (NCAA) (1936–present)

Milam Stadium located in Weatherford, Oklahoma is the home stadium of the NCAA Division II college football team the Bulldogs of Southwestern Oklahoma State University (SWOSU). The stadium boasts a seating capacity of 8,600. The stadium opened in 1936 and is named for, Joe Milam, a former Bulldog coach.

Milam Stadium hosted the 1996 NAIA Division I football season championship game against Montana Tech.
