= Joe Metcalf =

American football coach (1901–1979)

Biographical details
- Born: August 11, 1901; Harmon County, Oklahoma, U.S.
- Died: September 7, 1979 (aged 78); Harmon County, Oklahoma, U.S.
- Education: Southwestern Oklahoma State University

Coaching career (HC unless noted)
- 1952–1957: Southwestern Oklahoma State

Head coaching record
- Overall: 32–21–2

Joe Bailey Metcalf (Oklahoma, August 11, 1901 – Oklahoma, September 7, 1979) was an American football coach who served as head football coach at Southwestern Oklahoma State University from 1952 to 1957. He compiled a record of 32–21–2 for the Bulldogs.

As a high school coach before moving into the college ranks, Metcalf had coached Darrell Royal and Ted Owens on the Hollis, Oklahoma Tigers football team. He also coached Owens in basketball, discouraging the future legendary Kansas basketball coach of toying with the jump shot, in favor of the tried and true set shot.

After retiring as head coach of the Texas Longhorns, Darrell Royal would mention that even at the end of his coaching career in 1976, he was still using the principles learned from two men; Bud Wilkinson at the University of Oklahoma, and Joe Bailey Metcalf of Hollis High School and Southwestern Oklahoma State.

Before Ted Owens played basketball at Oklahoma, he was on the football team, courtesy of OU football assistant coach Bill Jennings. Jennings had come to Hollis High School to recruit two other Hollis Tiger football players, and Owens gives Metcalf credit for talking Jennings into giving Owens a half-scholarship as well.
