= Eric Morris (American football) =

American football player and coach (born 1985)

Current position
- Title: Head coach
- Team: Oklahoma State
- Conference: Big 12
- Record: 7–4

Biographical details
- Born: October 26, 1985 (age 41); Littlefield, Texas, U.S.

Playing career
- 2004–2008: Texas Tech
- 2009: Saskatchewan Roughriders
- Position: Wide receiver

Coaching career (HC unless noted)
- 2010: Houston (AOQC)
- 2011: Houston (GA)
- 2012: Washington State (IWR)
- 2013: Texas Tech (co-OC/IWR)
- 2014: Texas Tech (OC/WR)
- 2015–2017: Texas Tech (OC/IWR)
- 2018–2021: Incarnate Word
- 2022: Washington State (OC/QB)
- 2023–2025: North Texas
- 2026–present: Oklahoma State

Head coaching record
- Overall: 53–38
- Bowls: 0–1
- Tournaments: 1–2 (NCAA D-I playoffs)

Accomplishments and honors

Championships
- 2 Southland (2018, 2021)

Awards
- 2× Southland Coach of the Year (2018, 2021); AFCA Regional Coach of the Year (2018); Academic All-Big 12 (2007); All-Big 12 Second Team (2007); AAC Coach of the Year (2025)

Eric Morris (born October 26, 1985) is an American football coach and former player. He is currently the head football coach at Oklahoma State University. He was introduced as the head coach on December 8, 2025. He was previously the head football coach at the University of the Incarnate Word, offensive coordinator at Washington State University and head coach of the University of North Texas.

== Early life ==
Morris was born in Littlefield, Texas. He attended Shallowater High School in Shallowater, Texas, where he played basketball and football at the wide receiver and quarterback positions. Shallowater won the Division 4-2A basketball title during his senior season. Morris's father, Ray, coached basketball at the school.

== College career ==
Morris played college football at the wide receiver position for the Texas Tech Red Raiders under Mike Leach from 2004 to 2008. Known for being small and elusive, Morris earned the nickname of "the Elf" during his college playing career. He was named first-team Academic All-Big 12 in 2007 and was second-team All-Big 12 for punt returning.

== Professional playing career ==
Morris was signed by the Saskatchewan Roughriders as a street free agent in 2009. He was released in 2010.

== Coaching career ==
=== Early career ===
In 2010, Morris accepted a position as a graduate assistant for the Houston Cougars—a position at which he remained for two years. In 2011, Morris accepted the position of wide receivers coach at Washington State under his former college coach Mike Leach. Following the conclusion of the 2012 season, Morris accepted the position of co-offensive coordinator and receivers coach at his alma mater Texas Tech under head coach Kliff Kingsbury.

=== Texas Tech ===
Morris was promoted to full offensive coordinator following the departure of Sonny Cumbie in 2014.

Morris led an offense in 2015 that was ranked 2nd in the country in both total yardage and scoring. The offense was led by Sophomore QB Patrick Mahomes who threw for 4,683 yards and 36 TDs and by RB DeAndré Washington who rushed for 1,492 yards and 16 TDs, Washington being the first 1,000-yard rusher at Texas Tech in more than a decade. Morris coached 2016 NFL draft picks Le'Raven Clark, DeAndré Washington, and Jakeem Grant.

=== Incarnate Word ===
On December 30, 2017, Morris was named head coach at the University of the Incarnate Word (FCS) in San Antonio, Texas. In 2018, Morris' first season at UIW, he led the Cardinals to a 6–5 record, a share of the Southland Conference championship, and an FCS Playoffs berth. Following a record-breaking season full of firsts for the UIW football program, Morris was selected as the 2018 Southland Conference Coach of the Year and a finalist for the Eddie Robinson Award National Coach of the Year.

=== Washington State ===
Morris returned to Pullman as offensive coordinator under head coach Jake Dickert. He acted in that capacity for one season before leaving to take the North Texas head coaching job prior to the Cougars’ bowl game.

=== North Texas ===
On December 13, 2022, Morris was announced as the new head coach for the North Texas Mean Green. In 2025, Morris led the Mean Green to a school-record 12 wins and an American Conference Championship Game appearance. Additionally, the Mean Green were ranked in the AP Poll for the first time since 1959, ending the longest drought for an FBS team.

=== Oklahoma State ===
On November 25, 2025, Oklahoma State hired him to succeed Mike Gundy following the conclusion of the 2025 season. On September 12, 2026, Morris secured his first victory at Oklahoma State, an upset of sixth ranked Oregon, one of the largest upsets in college football history.

== Head coaching record ==
Year	Team	Overall	Conference	Standing	Bowl/playoffs	Coaches^{#}	AP/STATS^{°}
Incarnate Word Cardinals (Southland Conference) (2018–2021)
2018	Incarnate Word	6–5	6–2	T–1st	L NCAA Division I First Round		
2019	Incarnate Word	5–7	4–5	T–6th			
2020–21	Incarnate Word	3–3	3–3	T–3rd			
2021	Incarnate Word	10–3	7–1	1st	L NCAA Division I Second Round	13	12
Incarnate Word:		24–18	20–11				
North Texas Mean Green (American Athletic Conference / American Conference) (2023–2025)
2023	North Texas	5–7	3–5	T–8th			
2024	North Texas	6–7	3–5	T–9th	L First Responder		
2025	North Texas	11–2	7–1	T–1st	New Mexico*		24
North Texas:		22–16	13–11	*Did not coach bowl game			
Oklahoma State Cowboys (Big 12 Conference) (2026–present)
2026	Oklahoma State	7–4	5–3				
Oklahoma State:		7–4	5–3				
Total:		53–38					
National championship Conference title Conference division title or championship game berth
^{#}Rankings from final Coaches Poll.; ^{°}Rankings from final AP Poll.
