= Kevin Brown (running back) =

American gridiron football player (born 1996)

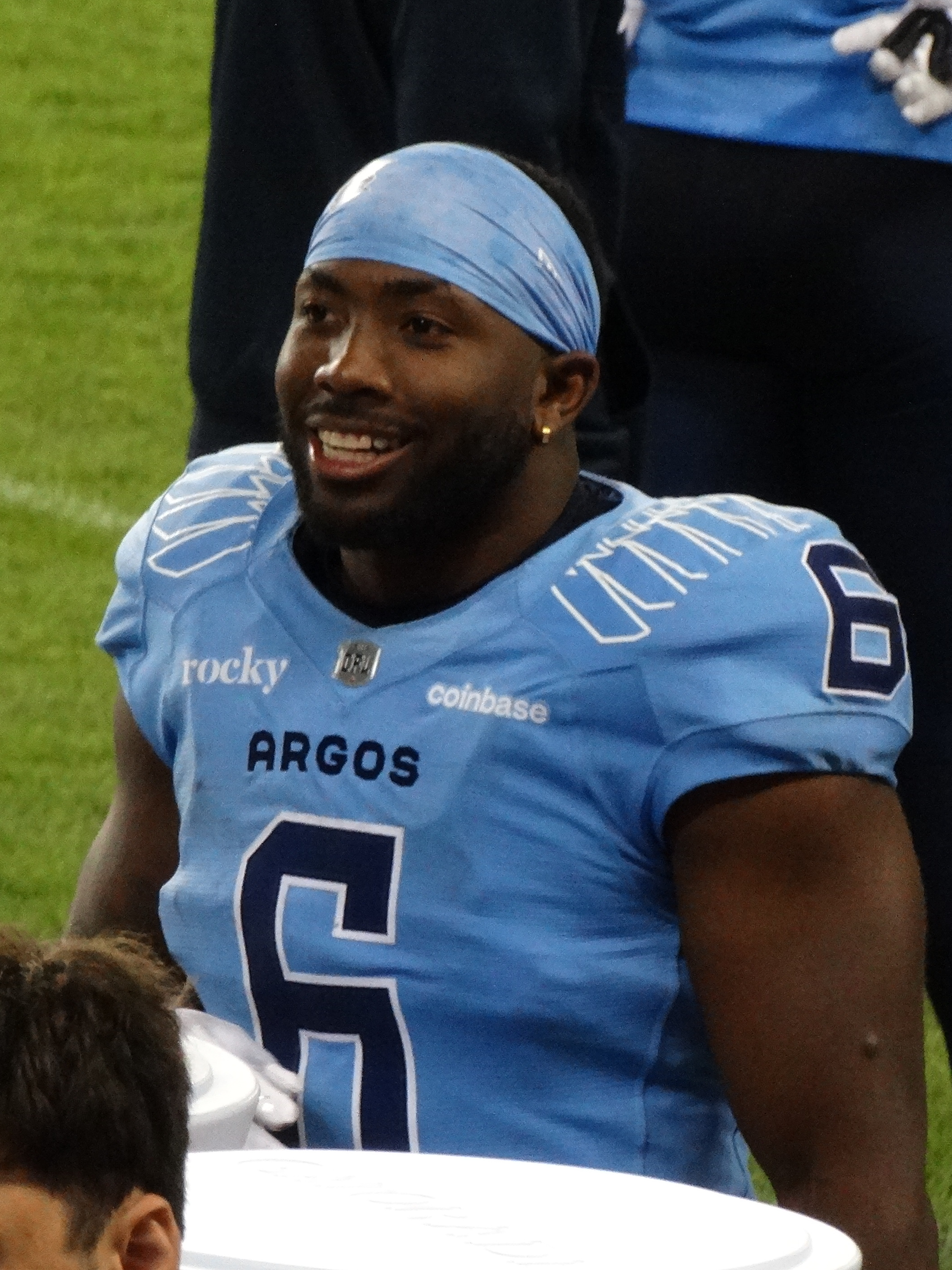
- Brown with the Toronto Argonauts in 2025

Profile
- Position: Running back

Personal information
- Born: October 9, 1996 (age 30); Mount Pleasant, South Carolina, U.S.
- Listed height: 5 ft 9 in (1.75 m)
- Listed weight: 205 lb (93 kg)

Career information
- High school: Wando (Mount Pleasant)
- College: Incarnate Word; Highland CC

Career history
- 2022–2024: Edmonton Elks
- 2025: Toronto Argonauts
- 2025: Hamilton Tiger-Cats
- Stats at CFL.ca

Kevin Brown (born October 9, 1996) is an American professional football running back. He most recently played for the Hamilton Tiger-Cats of the Canadian Football League (CFL).

== College career ==
Brown first played college football for the Highland Community College Scotties in 2017 and 2018. He then transferred to the University of the Incarnate Word in 2019 and played for the Cardinals football team from 2019 to 2021.

== Professional career ==
=== Edmonton Elks ===
Brown signed with the Edmonton Elks on September 1, 2022. In 2022, he was named the Most Outstanding Rookie for the Elks. In Week 15 of the 2023 season, Brown was named to the CFL Honour Roll after rushing for 175 yards against Saskatchewan. He played in all 18 regular season games in 2023 where he had 186 carries for 1,141 yards and four touchdowns and 28 receptions for 222 yards and one touchdown.

In 2024, Brown played in 12 games where he had 101 carries for 522 yards and 22 receptions for 138 yards. He eventually lost his starter role to Justin Rankin and Brown was moved to the practice roster in October. He finished the season on the practice roster and his contract expired on October 26, 2024.

=== Toronto Argonauts ===
On December 13, 2024, it was announced that Brown had signed with the Toronto Argonauts. However, he was part of the final cuts on June 1, 2025. He was re-signed by the Argonauts on June 17, 2025. Brown played in three regular season games where he had 18 carries for 37 yards and one touchdown.

=== Hamilton Tiger-Cats ===
On August 5, 2025, it was announced that Brown had signed with the Hamilton Tiger-Cats. He played in one game in August where he had two carries for 13 yards and then spent the rest of the season on the practice roster. His contract expired on November 9, 2025.
