= Brandon Lechtenberg =

American football coach (born c. 1982)

Current position
- Title: Head coach
- Team: Millsaps
- Conference: SAA
- Record: 11–9

Biographical details
- Born: c. 1982 (age 43–44); Butte, Nebraska, U.S.
- Education: University of Nebraska–Lincoln (2005); Texas Christian University

Playing career

Rugby
- 2000–2004: Nebraska
- Positions: Flanker, centre

Coaching career (HC unless noted)

Football
- 2005–2006: North Star HS (NE) (ST/DL)
- 2007: Central City HS (NE) (DC/LB)
- 2008–2010: TCU (GA)
- 2011–2016: Millsaps (DC)
- 2017: UT Martin (S)
- 2018–2021: Incarnate Word (ST/LB)
- 2022–2023: Central Oklahoma (DC/LB)
- 2024–present: Millsaps

Head coaching record
- Overall: 11–9

Brandon Lechtenberg (born c. 1982) is an American college football coach. He is the head football coach for Millsaps College, a position he has held since 2024. He also coached for Lincoln North Star High School, Central City High School, TCU, UT Martin, Incarnate Word, and Central Oklahoma. He played club rugby for Nebraska as a flanker and centre.

== Personal life ==
Lechtenberg's brother, Adam, is the head football coach for Central Connecticut State University, a position he has held since 2023.

== Head coaching record ==
Year	Team	Overall	Conference	Standing	Bowl/playoffs
Millsaps Majors (Southern Athletic Association) (2024–present)
2024	Millsaps	5–5	3–4	4th	
2025	Millsaps	6–4	4–3	T–3rd	
2026	Millsaps	0–0	0–0		
Millsaps:		11–9	7–7		
Total:		11–9			
