= 1996 NAIA Division I football season =

- Regular season: August–November 1996
- Postseason: November 23–December 7, 1996
- National Championship: Milam Stadium; Weatherford, OK
- Champions: Southwestern Oklahoma State

The 1996 NAIA Division I football season was the NAIA, was the 27th (and final) season of play of the NAIA's top division for football. The NAIA reverted to a single division for its football championship in 1997.

The regular season was played from August to November 1996. The 1996 NAIA Division I Football Championship Series then concluded with the 1996 NAIA Champion Bowl, played that year on December 7, 1996 at Milam Stadium in Weatherford, Oklahoma.

Southwestern Oklahoma State defeated Montana Tech in the Champion Bowl, 33–31, to win their first NAIA national title.

== Conference standings ==
1996 Frontier Conference football standings
	Conf.			Overall
Team	W		L	W		L
No. 2 Montana Tech $^	4	–	2	7	–	5
No. 4 Carroll (MT) ^	3	–	3	6	–	4
Rocky Mountain	3	–	3	6	–	4
Western Montana	2	–	4	3	–	6
$ – Conference champion; ^ – NAIA Division I playoff participant; Rankings from NAIA Division I poll

1996 Oklahoma Intercollegiate Conference football standings
	Conf.			Overall
Team	W		L	W		L
No. 1 SW Oklahoma State +^	4	–	1	9	–	3
No. 3 NW Oklahoma State +^	4	–	1	8	–	3
Langston	3	–	2	6	–	4
No. 5 SE Oklahoma State	3	–	2	6	–	4
East Central	1	–	4	3	–	7
Panhandle State	0	–	5	0	–	10
Northeastern State *	0	–	0	3	–	8
+ – Conference co-champions; ^ – NAIA Division I playoff participant * – ineligible for conference title; Rankings from NAIA Division I poll

1996 NAIA Division I independents football records
	Conf.			Overall
Team	W		L	W		L
Harding		–		6	–	4
Central State (OH)		–		4	–	4
Arkansas–Pine Bluff		–		5	–	5
Ouachita Baptist		–		3	–	7

== Conference champions ==
Conference	Champion	Record
Frontier	Montana Tech	4–2

== Rankings ==
Final NAIA Division I poll rankings:

Rank	Team (first place votes)	Record (thru Nov. 17)	Points
1	Southwestern Oklahoma State (2)	7–3	10
2	Montana Tech	6–4	8
3	Northwestern Oklahoma State	8–2	6
4	Carroll (MT)	6–3	4
5	SE Oklahoma State	6–4	2

== Postseason ==
1996 NAIA Division I Football Championship
	1st	2nd	3rd	4th	Total
Montana Tech	10	7	7	7	31
Southwestern Oklahoma State	0	23	7	3	33
- Stadium: Milam Stadium
- City: Weatherford, Oklahoma
- MOP (Offense): Keith Kizzie, Southwestern Oklahoma State
- MOP (Defense): Mark Patterson, Southwestern Oklahoma State
- Attendance: 4,500

=== Bracket ===
Semifinals; November 23
Carroll (MT)	28
Montana Tech	49
NW Oklahoma State	7
SW Oklahoma State	17

Championship Game; December 7
Montana Tech	31
SW Oklahoma State	33

== See also ==
- 1996 NCAA Division I-A football season
- 1996 NCAA Division I-AA football season
- 1996 NCAA Division II football season
- 1996 NCAA Division III football season
