= 2021 McNeese State Cowboys football team =

American college football season

2021 McNeese State Cowboys football
- Conference: Southland Conference
- Record: 4–7 (3–5 Southland)
- Head coach: Frank Wilson (2nd season)
- Offensive coordinator: Ronnie Letson (2nd season)
- Defensive coordinator: Deron Wilson (1st season)
- Home stadium: Cowboy Stadium

2021 Southland Conference football standings
	Conf.			Overall
Team	W		L	W		L
No. 12 Incarnate Word $^	7	–	1	10	–	3
No. 15 Southeastern Louisiana ^	6	–	2	9	–	4
Nicholls	5	–	3	6	–	5
McNeese State *	3	–	5	4	–	7
Northwestern State	3	–	5	3	–	8
Houston Baptist	0	–	8	0	–	11
$ – Conference champion; ^ – FCS playoff participant; * – Ineligible for FCS postseason play due to NCAA sanctions; Rankings from STATS Poll

The 2021 McNeese State Cowboys football team represented McNeese State University as a member of the Southland Conference during the 2021 NCAA Division I FCS football season. Led by Frank Wilson in his second and final season as head coach, the Cowboys compiled an overall record of 4–7 with a mark of 3–5 in conference play, tying for fourth place in the Southland. McNeese State played home games at Cowboy Stadium in Lake Charles, Louisiana.

== Preseason ==
=== Preseason poll ===
The Southland Conference released their preseason poll in July 2021. The Cowboys were picked to finish fourth in the conference. In addition, six Cowboys were chosen to the Preseason All-Southland Team.

=== Preseason All–Southland Teams ===
Offense

2nd Team

- Josh Matthews – Wide Receiver, SR

Defense

1st Team

- Isaiah Chambers – Defensive Lineman, SR
- Mason Kinsey – Defensive Lineman, RS-JR
- Andre Sam – Defensive Back, SR

2nd Team

- Chris Joyce – Defensive Back, JR
- Mason Pierce – Punt Returner, RS-SO

== Schedule ==
Date	Time	Opponent	Site	TV	Result	Attendance
September 4	12:00 p.m.	West Florida*	Cowboy Stadium; Lake Charles, LA	CST/ESPN+	L 36–42	8,665
September 11	7:00 p.m.	at LSU*	Tiger Stadium; Baton Rouge, LA	SECN+/ESPN+	L 7–34	94,220
September 18	6:00 p.m.	at Southern*	Ace W. Mumford Stadium; Baton Rouge, LA	ESPN+	W 31–24	15,003
September 25	12:00 p.m.	at Incarnate Word	Gayle and Tom Benson Stadium; San Antonio, TX	ESPN+	L 0–31	1,633
October 2	12:00 p.m.	No. 14 Southeastern Louisiana	Cowboy Stadium; Lake Charles, LA	CST/ESPN+	L 35–38	6,044
October 16	3:00 p.m.	at Northwestern State	Harry Turpin Stadium; Natchitoches, LA (rivalry)	CST/ESPN+	W 35–17	7,413
October 23	12:00 p.m.	No. 16 Incarnate Word^{†}	Cowboy Stadium; Lake Charles, LA	ESPN+	W 28–20	7,498
October 30	6:00 p.m.	at No. 8 Southeastern Louisiana	Strawberry Stadium; Hammond, LA	ESPN+	L 20–23	4,185
November 6	12:00 p.m.	Nicholls	Cowboy Stadium; Lake Charles, LA	CST/ESPN+	L 14–24	8,898
November 13	2:00 p.m.	at Houston Baptist	Husky Stadium; Houston, TX	ESPN+	W 44–3	2,325
November 20	12:00 p.m.	Northwestern State	Cowboy Stadium; Lake Charles, LA (rivalry)	ESPN+	L 20–24	8,412
*Non-conference game; ^{†}Homecoming; Rankings from STATS Poll released prior to the game; All times are in Central time

== Game summaries ==
=== West Florida ===
West Florida at McNeese State

Team	1	2	3	4	Total
• Argonauts	7	14	7	14	42
Cowboys	7	9	6	14	36

- Date: September 4, 2021
- Location: Cowboys Stadium
  Lake Charles, LA
- Game start: 12:00 p.m. CDT
- Elapsed time: 3:45
- Game attendance: 8,665
- Game weather: 88 °F (31 °C) • Weather: Partly Cloudy • Wind: 7 W
- Referee: Gary Leeper
- TV announcers (CST/ESPN+):

Scoring summary
1
2
3
4

Statistics	West Florida	McNeese State
First downs		
Total yards		
Rushing yards		
Passing yards		
Turnovers		
Time of possession		

Team	Category	Player	Statistics
West Florida	Passing		
West Florida	Rushing		
West Florida	Receiving		
McNeese State	Passing		
McNeese State	Rushing		
McNeese State	Receiving		

=== At LSU ===
McNeese State at Louisiana State

Team	1	2	3	4	Total
Cowboys	0	0	0	7	7
• Tigers	7	10	7	10	34

- Date: September 11, 2021
- Location: Tiger Stadium
  Baton Rouge, LA
- Game start: 7:00 p.m. CDT
- Elapsed time: 4:03
- Game attendance: 94,220
- Game weather: 83 °F (28 °C) • Weather: Sunny • Wind: SE 6mph
- Referee: Marc Curles
- TV announcers (SECN+/ESPN+):

Scoring summary
1
2
3
4

Statistics	McNeese State	LSU
First downs		
Total yards		
Rushing yards		
Passing yards		
Turnovers		
Time of possession		

Team	Category	Player	Statistics
McNeese State	Passing		
McNeese State	Rushing		
McNeese State	Receiving		
LSU	Passing		
LSU	Rushing		
LSU	Receiving		

=== At Southern ===
McNeese State at Southern

Team	1	2	3	4	Total
• Cowboys	7	3	10	11	31
Jaguars	14	7	0	3	24

- Date: September 18, 2021
- Location: Ace W. Mumford Stadium
  Baton Rouge, LA
- Game start: 6:00 p.m. CDT
- Elapsed time: 3:09
- Game attendance: 15,003
- Game weather: 84 °F (29 °C) • Weather: Sunny • Wind: E 6mph
- Referee: Y.N. Myers
- TV announcers (ESPN+):

Scoring summary
1
2
3
4

Statistics	McNeese State	Southern
First downs		
Total yards		
Rushing yards		
Passing yards		
Turnovers		
Time of possession		

Team	Category	Player	Statistics
McNeese State	Passing		
McNeese State	Rushing		
McNeese State	Receiving		
Southern	Passing		
Southern	Rushing		
Southern	Receiving		

=== At Incarnate Word ===
McNeese State at Incarnate Word

Team	1	2	3	4	Total
Cowboys	0	0	0	0	0
• Cardinals	14	7	7	3	31

- Date: September 25, 2021
- Location: Gayle and Tom Benson Stadium
  San Antonio, TX
- Game start: 11:00 a.m. CDT
- Elapsed time: 3:27
- Game attendance: 1,633
- Game weather: 81 °F (27 °C) • Weather: Sunny and clear • Wind: SE 4 MPH
- Referee: Ed Bourgeois
- TV announcers (ESPN+):

Scoring summary
1
2
3
4

Statistics	McNeese State	Incarnate Word
First downs		
Total yards		
Rushing yards		
Passing yards		
Turnovers		
Time of possession		

Team	Category	Player	Statistics
McNeese State	Passing		
McNeese State	Rushing		
McNeese State	Receiving		
Incarnate Word	Passing		
Incarnate Word	Rushing		
Incarnate Word	Receiving		

=== No. 14 Southeastern Louisiana ===
Southeastern Louisiana at McNeese State

Team	1	2	3	4	Total
• No. 14 Lions	14	10	7	7	38
Cowboys	7	0	14	14	35

- Date: October 2, 2021
- Location: Cowboys Stadium
  Lake Charles, LA
- Game start: 12:00 p.m. CDT
- Elapsed time: 3:36
- Game attendance: 6,044
- Game weather: 79 °F (26 °C) • Weather: Cloudy • Wind: SE 9
- Referee: Ed Bourgeois
- TV announcers (CST/ESPN+):

Scoring summary
1
2
3
4

Statistics	Southeastern Louisiana	McNeese State
First downs		
Total yards		
Rushing yards		
Passing yards		
Turnovers		
Time of possession		

Team	Category	Player	Statistics
Southeastern Louisiana	Passing		
Southeastern Louisiana	Rushing		
Southeastern Louisiana	Receiving		
McNeese State	Passing		
McNeese State	Rushing		
McNeese State	Receiving		

=== At Northwestern State ===
McNeese State at Northwestern State

Team	1	2	3	4	Total
• Cowboys	0	21	7	7	35
Demons	3	0	7	7	17

- Date: October 16, 2021
- Location: Harry Turpin Stadium
  Natchitoches, LA
- Game start: 3:00 p.m. CDT
- Elapsed time: 3:14
- Game attendance: 7,413
- Game weather: • Weather: TBD • Wind: TBD
- Referee: Gary Leeper
- TV announcers (CST/ESPN+):

Scoring summary
1
2
3
4

Statistics	McNeese State	Northwestern State
First downs		
Total yards		
Rushing yards		
Passing yards		
Turnovers		
Time of possession		

Team	Category	Player	Statistics
McNeese State	Passing		
McNeese State	Rushing		
McNeese State	Receiving		
Northwestern State	Passing		
Northwestern State	Rushing		
Northwestern State	Receiving		

=== No. 16 Incarnate Word ===
Incarnate Word at McNeese State

Team	1	2	3	4	Total
Cardinals	0	6	6	8	20
• Cowboys	14	7	0	7	28

- Date: October 23, 2021
- Location: Cowboys Stadium
  Lake Charles, LA
- Game start: 12:00 p.m. CDT
- Elapsed time: 3:35
- Game attendance: 7,498
- Game weather: 83 °F (28 °C) • Weather: Mostly Cloudy • Wind: SE 10
- Referee: Nolan Dumas
- TV announcers (ESPN+):

Scoring summary
1
2
3
4

Statistics	Incarnate Word	McNeese State
First downs		
Total yards		
Rushing yards		
Passing yards		
Turnovers		
Time of possession		

Team	Category	Player	Statistics
Incarnate Word	Passing		
Incarnate Word	Rushing		
Incarnate Word	Receiving		
McNeese State	Passing		
McNeese State	Rushing		
McNeese State	Receiving		

=== At No. 8 Southeastern Louisiana ===
McNeese State at Southeastern Louisiana

Team	1	2	3	4	Total
Cowboys	7	0	0	13	20
• No. 8 Lions	3	0	7	13	23

- Date: October 30, 2021
- Location: Strawberry Stadium
  Hammond, LA
- Game start: 6:00 p.m. CDT
- Elapsed time: 3:20
- Game attendance: 4,185
- Game weather: 65 °F (18 °C) • Weather: Clear • Wind: NW 7
- Referee: Craig Heiser
- TV announcers (ESPN+):

Scoring summary
1
2
3
4

Statistics	McNeese State	Southeastern Louisiana
First downs		
Total yards		
Rushing yards		
Passing yards		
Turnovers		
Time of possession		

Team	Category	Player	Statistics
McNeese State	Passing		
McNeese State	Rushing		
McNeese State	Receiving		
Southeastern Louisiana	Passing		
Southeastern Louisiana	Rushing		
Southeastern Louisiana	Receiving		

=== Nicholls ===
Nicholls at McNeese State

Team	1	2	3	4	Total
• Colonels	0	7	7	10	24
Cowboys	7	0	7	0	14

- Date: November 6, 2021
- Location: Cowboys Stadium
  Lake Charles, LA
- Game start: 12:00 p.m. CDT
- Elapsed time: 3:10
- Game attendance: 8,898
- Game weather: 56 °F (13 °C) • Weather: PC • Wind: NNE 8 mp
- Referee: Gary Leeper
- TV announcers (CST/ESPN+):

Scoring summary
1
2
3
4

Statistics	Nicholls	McNeese State
First downs		
Total yards		
Rushing yards		
Passing yards		
Turnovers		
Time of possession		

Team	Category	Player	Statistics
Nicholls	Passing		
Nicholls	Rushing		
Nicholls	Receiving		
McNeese State	Passing		
McNeese State	Rushing		
McNeese State	Receiving		

=== At Houston Baptist ===
McNeese State at Houston Baptist

Team	1	2	3	4	Total
• Cowboys	14	14	3	13	44
Huskies	3	0	0	0	3

- Date: November 13, 2021
- Location: Husky Stadium
  Houston, TX
- Game start: 2:00 p.m. CST
- Elapsed time: 3:11
- Game attendance: 2,325
- Game weather: 67 °F (19 °C) • Weather: Sunny • Wind: S 8mph
- Referee: Ed Bourgeois
- TV announcers (ESPN+):

Scoring summary
1
2
3
4

Statistics	McNeese State	Houston Baptist
First downs		
Total yards		
Rushing yards		
Passing yards		
Turnovers		
Time of possession		

Team	Category	Player	Statistics
McNeese State	Passing		
McNeese State	Rushing		
McNeese State	Receiving		
Houston Baptist	Passing		
Houston Baptist	Rushing		
Houston Baptist	Receiving		

=== Northwestern State ===
Northwestern State at McNeese State

Team	1	2	3	4	Total
• Demons	17	0	0	7	24
Cowboys	7	0	7	6	20

- Date: November 20, 2021
- Location: Cowboys Stadium
  Lake Charles, LA
- Game start: 12:00 p.m. CST
- Elapsed time: 3:15
- Game attendance: 8,412
- Game weather: 70 °F (21 °C) • Weather: Sunny • Wind: E5
- Referee: Nolan Dumas
- TV announcers (ESPN+):

Scoring summary
1
2
3
4

Statistics	Northwestern State	McNeese State
First downs		
Total yards		
Rushing yards		
Passing yards		
Turnovers		
Time of possession		

Team	Category	Player	Statistics
Northwestern State	Passing		
Northwestern State	Rushing		
Northwestern State	Receiving		
McNeese State	Passing		
McNeese State	Rushing		
McNeese State	Receiving		

== Personnel ==
2021 McNeese State Cowboys football team roster
Players
Coaches
Offense

Pos.	#	Name	Class
WR	0	Ceejay Powell	Sr
WR	1	Mason Pierce	So
RB	5	Stephon Huderson	Sr
WR	6	Josh Matthews	Sr
QB	7	Dillon Smith	Fr
QB	8	Cody Orgeron	Sr
QB	9	Walker Wood	Sr
QB	10	Jason Wakefield	So
QB	11	Devon Tott	Fr
QB	12	Cade Bartlett	So
QB	13	Ryan Roberts	Fr
WR	14	Severyn Foster	Jr
WR	14	Thomas Miles	So
WR	15	Jalen Johnson	Fr
WR	16	Brendan Sirls	Fr
WR	17	Jon McCall	Fr
RB	20	Deonta McMahon	Sr
RB	24	Josh Parker	So
RB	29	AJ Carter	Jr
RB	33	Ivory Roberts	So
TE	36	Dontay Hargrove	Sr
RB	37	Carlos Williams	So
TE	47	Dominic Prudhomme	So
OL	60	Paxton Crouse	So
OL	62	Juan Gonzales	Fr
OL	63	Charley Zeno	Jr
OL	64	Jack Zelezinski	So
OL	65	Clay Ancelet	Fr
OL	66	Dylan Dauzart	Fr
OL	67	Keaton Altman	Fr
OL	68	Jared Chapman	Fr
OL	69	Aaron McDaniel	So
OL	70	Hezekiah Neason	So
OL	71	Caron Coleman	Sr
OL	72	Cameron Foster	Fr
OL	73	Calvin Barkat	Sr
OL	74	Christopher Stephens	Fr
OL	75	Hayden Shaw	Fr
OL	77	Nick Holiday	Jr
OL	78	Trey Winters	So
OL	79	Romello Tarver	So
TE	80	Jamal Pettigrew	Sr
WR	81	Deon Cormier	Jr
WR	83	Raheem Roberts	Fr
TE	84	KJ Brown	So
WR	85	Zach Hayes	Jr
WR	86	Markel Cotten	So
WR	87	Chris Raymond	Jr
TE	88	CJ Knighten	Fr
WR	89	Christian Thomas	Fr
RB		Tyler Gainey	Fr
WR		Gage Rapp	Fr
RB		Jai'Van Samuel	Fr

Defense

Pos.	#	Name	Class
DB	1	Colby Richardson	Sr
DB	3	Quad Wilson	Fr
CB	4	Corione Harris	Sr
DB	5	Chris Joyce	Jr
LB	10	Darius Daniels	Jr
DB	12	Edward Gilds	Fr
DB	13	Lathan Adams	Fr
DB	18	Trent Winbush	Jr
DB	21	Andre Sam	Jr
DB	22	Rae'Kwon Starks	So
LB	23	Kordell Williams	Sr
DB	25	Darius Shields	So
DB	26	Richard Akers	Fr
DB	27	Enos Lewis	Sr
LB	28	Ge'Mon Eaford	Fr
DB	30	Tyler Toliver	Fr
DB	31	Twillie Lovett	Fr
DB	32	Alijah Hamilton	Fr
DB	33	Travis Walker	Fr
DB	34	Eli Johnson	Jr
LB	35	Kobe Callahan	So
DB	36	Tremayne Evans	Fr
DL	40	Isaiah Chambers	Sr
DB	41	Gus Nave	Sr
DE	42	Earenest Grayson III	So
DL	43	Tyrell Flugence	Jr
LB	45	Tahj Samuel	Jr
DE	47	Khaylon Chapple	Fr
LB	48	Micah Davey	Fr
LB	49	Jake Lafleur	Fr
DL	52	Mason Kinsey	Jr
LB	54	lester Joseph	So
DB	54	Bradley Livingstone	Fr
DL	55	Joey McNeely	Jr
LB	56	Brayden Adams	Jr
DE	58	Logan Sonnier	So
DL	59	Grayson Mays	So
DL	90	Demond Stewart	Sr
DL	91	Welland Williams	Fr
DL	92	Arthur Lott	So
DL	93	Masry Mapieu	Sr
DL	94	Eli Goss	Fr
DL	96	C. J. Semien	Sr
DL	98	Leon Young	So
DL	99	Accord Green	Sr
LB		Ty Fuselier	Fr
DB		Jake Hadzicki	Fr
DB		Brian Lampton	Fr
DB		Richard Lee	Fr
DB		Jace Marsters	Fr
LB		Noah Simon	Fr

Special teams

Pos.	#	Name	Class
K, LS	37	Mason Caldwell	Jr
K	38	Nolan Heitmeier	Fr
K, P	38	Eemil Herranen	Fr
K	39	Jacob Abel	Sr
P	39	Callum Eddings	Fr
K	41	Brandon Hayden	Jr
K	42	Graycen Kennedy	Jr
LS	50	Trey Vondenstein	So
LS	51	Carter Jenke	So

Head coach

- Frank Wilson (Nicholls State)

Coordinators/assistant coaches

- Ronnie Letson (Mississippi)
  Offensive coordinator
- Deron Wilson (Southern Miss)
  Defensive coordinator
- Gary Hyman (Stanislaus State)
  Special teams coordinator
- Landon Hoefer (Texas Tech)
  Running backs
- Chris Truax (LSU)
  Offensive line
- JB Lageman (Louisville)
  Defensive line
- Willie Mack Garza (Texas)
  Safeties
- Will Thomas (LSU)
  Linebackers
- Blaine Gautier (Louisiana)
  Wide receivers
- Rishaw Johnson (California (PA))
  Tight ends

Legend

- (C) Team captain
- (S) Suspended
- (I) Ineligible
- Injured
- Redshirt

Roster
Last update: 2 August 2021
