= 2021 Nicholls Colonels football team =

American college football season

2021 Nicholls Colonels football
- Conference: Southland Conference
- Record: 6–5 (5–3 Southland)
- Head coach: Tim Rebowe (7th season)
- Offensive coordinator: Rob Christophel (7th season)
- Offensive scheme: Spread
- Defensive coordinator: Tommy Rybacki (7th season)
- Base defense: Multiple 4–3
- Home stadium: Manning Field at John L. Guidry Stadium

2021 Southland Conference football standings
	Conf.			Overall
Team	W		L	W		L
No. 12 Incarnate Word $^	7	–	1	10	–	3
No. 15 Southeastern Louisiana ^	6	–	2	9	–	4
Nicholls	5	–	3	6	–	5
McNeese State *	3	–	5	4	–	7
Northwestern State	3	–	5	3	–	8
Houston Baptist	0	–	8	0	–	11
$ – Conference champion; ^ – FCS playoff participant; * – Ineligible for FCS postseason play due to NCAA sanctions; Rankings from STATS Poll

The 2021 Nicholls State Colonels football team represented Nicholls State University as a member of the Southland Conference during the 2021 NCAA Division I FCS football season. Led by seventh-year head coach Tim Rebowe, the Colonels compiled an overall record of 6–5 with a mark of 5–3 in conference play, placing third in the Southland. Nicholls State played home games at John L. Guidry Stadium in Thibodaux, Louisiana.

== Preseason ==
=== Preseason poll ===
The Southland Conference released their preseason poll in July 2021. The Colonels were picked to finish second in the conference. In addition, eleven Colonels were chosen to the Preseason All-Southland Team.

=== Preseason All–Southland Teams ===
Offense

1st Team

- David Mosley – Tight End/Halfback, SR
- Dai'Jean Dixon – Wide Receiver, SR
- P. J. Burkhalter – Offensive Lineman, SR
- Jair Joseph – Offensive Lineman, SR
- Evan Roussel – Offensive Lineman, SO

2nd Team

- Julien Gums – Running Back, SR
- KJ Franklin – Wide Receiver, JR

Defense

1st Team

- Kevin Moore III – Defensive Back, SR

2nd Team

- Perry Ganci – Defensive Lineman, SO
- Hayden Shaheen – Linebacker, FR
- Dontaze Costly – Kick Returner, SR

== Personnel ==
2021 Nicholls Colonels football team roster
Players
Coaches
Offense

Pos.	#	Name	Class
QB	0	Lindsey Scott Jr.	Sr
WR	2	K. J. Franklin	So
WR	3	Devonta Jason	So
WR	4	Lex Boucvalt	Fr
WR	5	Dai'Jean Dixon	Sr
RB	6	Marquese Albert	Fr
WR	9	Dontaze Costly	Jr
QB	10	Leonard Kelly	Fr
QB	11	Dillon Monette	Fr
QB	12	Andrew Robison	Fr
WR	13	Daniel Miller	Fr
WR	14	Arron McKenney	Sr
QB	15	Kohen Granier	Jr
RB	19	Collin Guggenheim	Fr
RB	20	Ronnie Jackson	Fr
WR	23	Brooks Thomas	Fr
WR	24	Justin Rivet	Fr
RB	25	Jake Dalmado	Fr
RB	26	Dalen Gondron	Fr
RB	28	Julien Gums	Jr
RB	30	Corey Warren Jr.	Fr
RB	33	TyShaun Hester	Fr
RB	35	Jaylon Spears	Fr
RB	36	Jai Williams	Fr
RB	37	John Carrington III	So
RB	37	Hugh Hamer	Fr
WR	38	Lance Williams	Fr
TE	42	Ja'Cobey Lee	So
TE	43	Nathan Hebb	Fr
TE	44	Codi Willis	So
OL	56	Joshua Echeverria	So
OL	57	Jeremiah James	So
OL	59	Baylee Trusty	Jr
OL	61	Reed Lambert	Fr
OL	62	Seth Trahan	Fr
OL	63	Ethan Bairnsfather	So
OL	64	P. J. Burkhalter	Sr
OL	67	Owen Melville	Fr
OL	68	Michael Hill	Fr
OL	69	Zakk McKeehan	So
OL	70	Titus Jones	So
OL	71	Evan Roussel	Fr
OL	73	Jair Joseph	Sr
OL	74	DeAndre' Keller	Fr
OL	75	Mark Barthelemy	Jr
OL	77	Mikhail Hill	Jr
OL	78	Jaden Ben	Fr
OL	79	Cru Blanchard	Fr
WR	80	Al'Dontre Davis	Jr
WR	81	David Robinson Jr.	So
TE	82	Brandon Hubicz	Fr
WR	83	Dany'e Brooks	Fr
WR	83	Mike Gray Jr.	Fr
WR	84	Terry Matthews	So
TE	85	Lee Negrotto	Fr
WR	86	Jay Tyler	Fr
WR	87	Quincy Cage Jr.	Sr
TE	88	David Mosley	Sr
TE	89	Logan Wilcox	Fr

Defense

Pos.	#	Name	Class
DB	1	Kevin Johnson	Sr
DB	6	Jordan Jackson	So
DB	7	Kevin Moore III	Sr
DB	8	Jarius Monroe	So
LB	10	Hayden Shaheen	Fr
DL	11	Tahj Brown	So
DB	12	Brandon James	Fr
DB	14	Bryce Authement	Fr
DB	16	James Tobin IV	Sr
DB	17	Lloyd Nash	So
DL	18	Juan Monjarres	Jr
DB	20	Greg Evans	Fr
DB	21	Malik Woodery	Fr
DB	22	Tyreke Boyd	Fr
DB	24	Chancellor Hitchens	Fr
LB	25	Elijah Reames	So
DB	26	Keontae Williams	Fr
DB	27	Maurquel Price	Fr
DB	29	Chase Brown	Jr
DB	31	Tyler Morton	Fr
DB	32	Shawn Hall	So
DB	33	Logan Scott	Fr
LB	34	Ty'Ree Evans	Sr
LB	36	Hayden Seneca	Fr
DB	37	Hugh Gregory Hamer	Fr
LB	39	Chandler Rhodes	Fr
LB	40	Johmel Jolla Jr.	Fr
DB	41	Zane McCrary	Fr
DB	42	Pershing Toney	Fr
DB	43	Caleb Lee	Fr
LB	45	Quinton Sharkey	Jr
LB	46	Kaleb Brown	Fr
LB	48	Mark Thomas II	Fr
LB	49	Jacob Parker	So
LB	51	Tylan Turner	Fr
LB	52	Lance Rockwood Jr.	Fr
LB	58	Kylin White	Fr
DL	59	Deondre Diggs	Jr
DL	62	Shane Levy	So
DL	65	Christian Mannino	Fr
DL	88	Theodore Tyler	So
DL	90	Caboz Craig	Fr
DL	91	Zack Bernard	Fr
DL	92	Elinus Noel III	Fr
DL	93	Jamiran James	So
DL	94	Jequaries Martin	Sr
DL	95	Dillion Davis	Fr
DL	96	Glen Thurmond	Jr
DL	98	Perry Ganci	So
DL	99	Myles Vigne	Sr

Special teams

Pos.	#	Name	Class
K/P	34	Patrick Vanderbrook	Fr
P	39	Matthew Martin	So
K	46	Gavin Lasseigne	So
P	47	Craig Walker	Jr
LS	50	Jackson McFarland	Fr
LS	53	Dominic Brocato	Jr
LS	54	Andrea Dragna	So

Head coach

- Tim Rebowe (LSU)

Coordinators/assistant coaches

- Rob Christophel (Austin Peay State)
  Offensive coordinator/qb
- Tommy Rybacki (Jacksonville State)
  Defensive coordinator
- Russ Gisclair (Nicholls State)
  Tight ends
- Marquase Lovings (Mississippi State)
  Defensive line
- Tylan Martin (Jacksonville State)
  Running backs
- Sean Murphy (Millsaps College)
  Wide receivers
- Lee Roussel (Southeastern Louisiana)
  Offensive line
- Lionel Stokes (Louisiana–Lafayette)
  Cornerbacks
- Brian Wallace (Louisiana College)
  Safeties

Legend

- (C) Team captain
- (S) Suspended
- (I) Ineligible
- Injured
- Redshirt

Roster
Last update: 3 August 2021

== Schedule ==
Date	Time	Opponent	Rank	Site	TV	Result	Attendance
September 4	6:00 p.m.	at Memphis*	No. 22	Liberty Bowl Memorial Stadium; Memphis, TN	ESPN+	L 17–42	30,263
September 11	6:00 p.m.	at Louisiana*		Cajun Field; Lafayette, LA	ESPN3	L 24–27	25,417
September 25	3:00 p.m.	North Alabama*		Manning Field at John L. Guidry Stadium; Thibodaux, LA	ESPN+	W 31–17	7,314
October 2	3:00 p.m.	Houston Baptist		Manning Field at John L. Guidry Stadium; Thibodaux, LA	ESPN3	W 48–17	5,840
October 9	12:00 p.m.	No. 14 Southeastern Louisiana	No. 25	Manning Field at John L. Guidry Stadium; Thibodaux, LA (River Bell Classic)	ESPN+	L 48–58	7,402
October 16	11:00 a.m.	at No. 18 Incarnate Word		Gayle and Tom Benson Stadium; San Antonio, TX	ESPN3	L 21–38	1,369
October 23	6:00 p.m.	at Houston Baptist		Husky Stadium; Houston, TX	ESPN+	W 44–14	2,362
October 30	12:00 p.m.	Northwestern State		Manning Field at John L. Guidry Stadium; Thibodaux, LA (NSU Challenge)	ESPN+	W 42–21	7,328
November 6	12:00 p.m.	at McNeese State		Cowboy Stadium; Lake Charles, LA	ESPN+	W 24–14	8,898
November 13	3:00 p.m.	No. 17 Incarnate Word		Manning Field at John L. Guidry Stadium; Thibodaux, LA	ESPN3	L 23–27	6,392
November 18	6:00 p.m.	at No. 15 Southeastern Louisiana		Strawberry Stadium; Hammond, LA (River Bell Classic)	ESPN+	W 45–42	6,057
*Non-conference game; Rankings from STATS Poll released prior to the game; All times are in Central time

== Game summaries ==
=== At Memphis ===
Nicholls at Memphis

Team	1	2	3	4	Total
No. 22 (FCS) Colonels	7	0	7	3	17
• Tigers	10	19	6	7	42

- Date: September 4, 2021
- Location: Liberty Bowl Memorial Stadium
  Memphis, TN
- Game start: 6:05 p.m. CDT
- Elapsed time: 03:13
- Game attendance: 30,263
- Game weather: 87 °F (31 °C) • Weather: Sunny • Wind: S 9mph
- Referee: Edwin Lee
- TV announcers (ESPN+): Richard Cross (play-by-play) and Leger Douzable (analyst)

Scoring summary
1
2
3
4

Statistics	Nicholls	Memphis
First downs	17	32
Total yards	299	587
Rushing yards	100	322
Passing yards	199	265
Turnovers	0	1
Time of possession	28:45	31:15

Team	Category	Player	Statistics
Nicholls	Passing	Lindsey Scott Jr.	17/30, 194 yards, 1 TD
Nicholls	Rushing	Julien Gums	13 carries, 48 yards
Nicholls	Receiving	Dai'Jean Dixon	7 receptions, 107 yards
Memphis	Passing	Seth Henigan	19/32, 265 yards, 1 TD
Memphis	Rushing	Brandon Thomas	16 carries, 147 yards, 1 TD
Memphis	Receiving	Javon Ivory	5 receptions, 106 yards

=== At Louisiana ===
Nicholls at Louisiana

Team	1	2	3	4	Total
Colonels	7	3	0	14	24
• Ragin' Cajuns	10	7	7	3	27

- Date: September 11, 2021
- Location: Cajun Field
  Lafayette, LA
- Game start: 6:04 p.m. CDT
- Elapsed time: 3 hours and 15 minutes
- Game attendance: 25,417
- Game weather: 85 °F (29 °C) • Weather: Sunny • Wind: NE 5 MPH
- Referee: Trennis Livingston
- TV announcers (ESPN3): Dan McDonald (play–by–play) and Scott Brazda (analyst)

Scoring summary
1	12:10	LA	John Stephens Jr. 14-yard pass from Levi Lewis (Kenneth Almendares kick) (7 plays, 80 yards, 2:46)	LA 7–0
1	10:54	NICH	Dai'Jean Dixon 21-yard pass from Lindsey Scott Jr. (Gavin Lasseigne kick) (3 plays, 25 yards, 1:10)	TIE 7–7
1	08:20	LA	Kenneth Almendares 46-yard field goal (6 plays, 21 yards, 2:26)	LA 10–7
2	05:54	LA	Michael Jefferson 46-yard pass from Levi Lewis (Kenneth Almendares kick) (4 plays, 99 yards, 2:09)	LA 17–7
2	00:36	NICH	Gavin Lasseigne 42-yard field goal (9 plays, 32 yards, 1:38)	LA 17–10
3	00:43	LA	Kris Moncrief 67-yard interception returned (Kenneth Almendares kick) (2 plays, 0 yards, 0:52)	LA 24–10
4	09:29	LA	Kenneth Almendares 28-yard field goal (14 plays, 72 yards, 4:10)	LA 27–10
4	05:03	NICH	K. J. Franklin 20-yard pass from Lindsey Scott Jr. (Gavin Lasseigne kick) (10 plays, 75 yards, 4:26)	LA 27–17
4	00:33	NICH	Dai'Jean Dixon 6-yard pass from Lindsey Scott Jr. (Gavin Lasseigne kick) (7 plays, 81 yards, 1:45)	LA 27–24

Statistics	Nicholls	Louisiana
First downs	24	20
Total yards	511	417
Rushing yards	152	113
Passing yards	359	304
Turnovers	1	1
Time of possession	33:12	26:48

Team	Category	Player	Statistics
Nicholls	Passing	Lindsey Scott Jr.	26/37, 359 yards, 3 TDs, 1 INT
Nicholls	Rushing	Lindsey Scott Jr.	18 carries, 121 yards
Nicholls	Receiving	Dai'Jean Dixon	14 receptions, 198 yards, 2 TDs
Louisiana	Passing	Levi Lewis	19/33, 304 yards, 2 TDs
Louisiana	Rushing	Chris Smith	11 carries, 46 yards
Louisiana	Receiving	Michael Jefferson	3 receptions, 84 yards, 1 TD

=== North Alabama ===
North Alabama at Nicholls

Team	1	2	3	4	Total
Lions	7	7	0	0	14
• Colonels	0	3	14	14	31

- Date: September 25, 2021
- Location: Manning Field at John L. Guidry Stadium
  Thibodaux, LA
- Game start: 3:00 p.m. CDT
- Elapsed time: 3:19
- Game attendance: 7,314
- Game weather: 80 °F (27 °C) • Weather: Clear • Wind: 8mph
- Referee: Gary Leeper
- TV announcers (ESPN+):

Scoring summary
1
2
3
4

Statistics	North Alabama	Nicholls
First downs	21	28
Total yards	314	463
Rushing yards	130	291
Passing yards	184	172
Turnovers	1	1
Time of possession	30:42	29:18

Team	Category	Player	Statistics
North Alabama	Passing		
North Alabama	Rushing		
North Alabama	Receiving		
Nicholls	Passing		
Nicholls	Rushing		
Nicholls	Receiving		

=== Houston Baptist ===
Houston Baptist at Nicholls

Team	1	2	3	4	Total
Huskies	0	14	0	3	17
• Colonels	21	14	10	3	48

- Date: October 2, 2021
- Location: Manning Field at John L. Guidry Stadium
  Thibodaux, LA
- Game start: 3:00 p.m. CDT
- Elapsed time: 3:03
- Game attendance: 5,840
- Game weather: 78 °F (26 °C) • Weather: Cloudy and muggy • Wind: 7mph ESE
- Referee: Nolan Dumas
- TV announcers (ESPN3):

Scoring summary
1
2
3
4

Statistics	Houston Baptist	Nicholls
First downs	10	33
Total yards	182	650
Rushing yards	35	421
Passing yards	147	229
Turnovers	2	4
Time of possession	22:45	37:15

Team	Category	Player	Statistics
Houston Baptist	Passing		
Houston Baptist	Rushing		
Houston Baptist	Receiving		
Nicholls	Passing		
Nicholls	Rushing		
Nicholls	Receiving		

=== No. 14 Southeastern Louisiana ===
Southeastern Louisiana at Nicholls

Team	1	2	3	4	Total
• No. 14 Lions	7	24	14	13	58
No. 25 Colonels	7	7	21	13	48

- Date: October 9, 2021
- Location: Manning Field at John L. Guidry Stadium
  Thibodaux, LA
- Game start: 12:00 p.m. CDT
- Elapsed time: 3:17
- Game attendance: 7,402
- Game weather: 83 °F (28 °C) • Weather: Clear and sunny • Wind: 2mph NNE
- Referee: Gary Leeper
- TV announcers (ESPN+):

Scoring summary
1
2
3
4

Statistics	Southeastern Louisiana	Nicholls
First downs	32	26
Total yards	573	507
Rushing yards	167	209
Passing yards	406	298
Turnovers	1	0
Time of possession	37:51	22:09

Team	Category	Player	Statistics
Southeastern Louisiana	Passing		
Southeastern Louisiana	Rushing		
Southeastern Louisiana	Receiving		
Nicholls	Passing		
Nicholls	Rushing		
Nicholls	Receiving		

=== At No. 18 Incarnate Word ===
Nicholls at Incarnate Word

Team	1	2	3	4	Total
Colonels	7	14	0	0	21
• No. 18 Cardinals	0	14	7	17	38

- Date: October 16, 2021
- Location: Gayle and Tom Benson Stadium
  San Antonio, TX
- Game start: 11:00 a.m. CDT
- Elapsed time: 3:09
- Game attendance: 1,369
- Game weather: 69 °F (21 °C) • Weather:Sunny • Wind: 14mph SSW
- Referee: Ed Bourgeois
- TV announcers (ESPN3): David Saltzman (play-by-play), Taylor McHargue (analyst), & Lainie Fritz (sideline)

Scoring summary
1
2
3
4

Statistics	Nicholls	Incarnate Word
First downs	28	19
Total yards	445	469
Rushing yards	202	81
Passing yards	243	388
Turnovers	1	0
Time of possession	35:25	24:35

Team	Category	Player	Statistics
Nicholls	Passing	Lindsey Scott Jr.	19/29, 214 yards, TD, INT
Nicholls	Rushing	Lindsey Scott Jr.	20 carries, 90 yards, TD
Nicholls	Receiving	Dai'Jean Dixon	9 receptions, 120 yards, TD
Incarnate Word	Passing	Cam Ward	25/36, 388 yards, 4 TD
Incarnate Word	Rushing	Kevin Brown	14 carries, 80 yards, TD
Incarnate Word	Receiving	Taylor Grimes	9 receptions, 182 yards, 4 TD

=== At Houston Baptist ===
Nicholls at Houston Baptist

Team	1	2	3	4	Total
• Colonels	27	3	7	7	44
Huskies	7	7	0	0	14

- Date: October 23, 2021
- Location: Husky Stadium
  Houston, TX
- Game start: 6:00 p.m. CDT
- Elapsed time: 03:11
- Game attendance: 2,362
- Game weather: 68 °F (20 °C) • Weather: Rain • Wind: 9mph S
- Referee: Craig Helser
- TV announcers (ESPN+):

Scoring summary
1
2
3
4

Statistics	Nicholls	Houston Baptist
First downs	30	15
Total yards	572	157
Rushing yards	347	8
Passing yards	225	149
Turnovers	2	1
Time of possession	36:52	23:04

Team	Category	Player	Statistics
Nicholls	Passing		
Nicholls	Rushing		
Nicholls	Receiving		
Houston Baptist	Passing		
Houston Baptist	Rushing		
Houston Baptist	Receiving		

=== Northwestern State ===
Northwestern State at Nicholls

Team	1	2	3	4	Total
Demons	0	14	0	7	21
• Colonels	7	21	14	0	42

- Date: October 30, 2021
- Location: Manning Field at John L. Guidry Stadium
  Thibodaux, LA
- Game start: 12:00 p.m. CDT
- Elapsed time: 3:00
- Game attendance: 7328
- Game weather: 64 °F (18 °C) • Weather:Sunny and clear • Wind: WNW 9mph
- Referee: Nolan Dumas
- TV announcers (ESPN+):

Scoring summary
1
2
3
4

Statistics	Northwestern State	Nicholls
First downs	17	34
Total yards	345	564
Rushing yards	135	300
Passing yards	210	264
Turnovers	3	1
Time of possession	25:54	34:06

Team	Category	Player	Statistics
Northwestern State	Passing		
Northwestern State	Rushing		
Northwestern State	Receiving		
Nicholls	Passing		
Nicholls	Rushing		
Nicholls	Receiving		

=== At McNeese State ===
Nicholls at McNeese State

Team	1	2	3	4	Total
• Colonels	0	7	7	10	24
Cowboys	7	0	7	0	14

- Date: November 6, 2021
- Location: Cowboy Stadium
  Lake Charles, LA
- Game start: 12:00 p.m. CDT
- Elapsed time: 3:10
- Game attendance: 8,898
- Game weather: 56 °F (13 °C) • Weather: PC • Wind: NNE 8mph
- Referee: Gary Leeper
- TV announcers (ESPN+):

Scoring summary
1
2
3
4

Statistics	Nicholls	McNeese State
First downs	22	22
Total yards	367	352
Rushing yards	180	188
Passing yards	187	164
Turnovers	2	4
Time of possession	30:25	29:35

Team	Category	Player	Statistics
Nicholls	Passing		
Nicholls	Rushing		
Nicholls	Receiving		
McNeese State	Passing		
McNeese State	Rushing		
McNeese State	Receiving		

=== No. 17 Incarnate Word ===
Incarnate Word at Nicholls

Team	1	2	3	4	Total
• No. 17 Cardinals	0	13	14	0	27
Colonels	10	10	0	3	23

- Date: November 13, 2021
- Location: Manning Field at John L. Guidry Stadium
  Thibodaux, LA
- Game start: 3:00 p.m. CST
- Elapsed time: 3:40
- Game attendance: 6392
- Game weather: 60 °F (16 °C) • Weather: Clear • Wind: NNW11mph
- Referee: Craig Helser
- TV announcers (ESPN3): John Liddle (play-by-play), Gary Reasons (analyst), Lainie Fritz (sideline)

Scoring summary
1
2
3
4

Statistics	Incarnate Word	Nicholls
First downs	13	31
Total yards	376	491
Rushing yards	268	220
Passing yards	108	271
Turnovers	3	2
Time of possession	17:52;	42:08

Team	Category	Player	Statistics
Incarnate Word	Passing	Cameron Ward	13/30, 108 yards, 2 TD, 2 INT
Incarnate Word	Rushing	Kevin Brown	11 carries, 185 yards, 2 TD
Incarnate Word	Receiving	Robert Ferrel	4 receptions, 47 yards
Nicholls	Passing	Kohen Granier	18/27, 191 yards, TD
Nicholls	Rushing	Collin Guggenheim	32 carries, 141 yards, TD
Nicholls	Receiving	Dai'Jean Dixon	8 receptions, 90 yards

=== At No. 15 Southeastern Louisiana ===
Nicholls at Southeastern Louisiana

Team	1	2	3	4	Total
• Colonels	21	0	17	7	45
No. 15 Lions	14	14	0	14	42

- Date: November 18, 2021
- Location: Strawberry Stadium
  Hammond, LA
- Game start: 6:00 p.m. CST
- Elapsed time: 3:45
- Game attendance: 6,057
- Game weather: 59 °F (15 °C) • Weather: Cloudy • Wind: N13mph
- Referee: Gary Leeper
- TV announcers (ESPN+):

Scoring summary
1
2
3
4

Statistics	Nicholls	Southeastern Louisiana
First downs	28	26
Total yards	556	496
Rushing yards	292	111
Passing yards	264	385
Turnovers	2	1
Time of possession	33:29	26:31

Team	Category	Player	Statistics
Nicholls	Passing		
Nicholls	Rushing		
Nicholls	Receiving		
Southeastern Louisiana	Passing		
Southeastern Louisiana	Rushing		
Southeastern Louisiana	Receiving		
