= List of UTSA Roadrunners head football coaches =

The UTSA Roadrunners college football team represents the University of Texas at San Antonio in the American Athletic Conference (AAC), competing as a part of the National Collegiate Athletic Association (NCAA) Division I Football Bowl Subdivision. The program has had three head coaches since its inaugural 2011 season; it began play as an FCS independent, but transitioned to the WAC the next season, then to Conference USA beginning with the 2013 season, and to the AAC for the 2023 season. Jeff Traylor is the current head coach; he was hired on December 9, 2019.

The nickname "Roadrunners" has been used by UTSA's athletic programs since 1978, after winning out over "Armadillos" in an election among the university's student body the prior year. The Roadrunners have played in 172 games over 14 seasons, compiling a 91–81 record. Frank Wilson led the program to its first bowl appearance in 2016, and Traylor has led the team to bowl appearances in each of his first three seasons. Traylor has led the team to two conference championships, in 2021 and 2022. None of the coaches have been enshrined into the College Football Hall of Fame. Traylor is the leader in games coached (66), wins (46), and win percentage (.721). Coker is the leader in losses (32).

== Key ==
Key to symbols in coaches list
General		Overall		Conference		Postseason (Note: Although the first Rose Bowl Game was played in 1902, it has been continuously played since the 1916 game, and is recognized as the oldest bowl game by the NCAA. "—" indicates any season prior to 1916 when postseason games were not played.)	
No.	Order of coaches (Note: A running total of the number of head coaches, with coaches who served separate tenures being counted only once. Interim head coaches are represented with "Int" and are not counted in the running total. "—" indicates the team played but either without a coach or no coach is on record. "X" indicates an interim year without play.)	GC	Games coached	CW	Conference wins	PW	Postseason wins
DC	Division championships	OW	Overall wins	CL	Conference losses	PL	Postseason losses
CC	Conference championships	OL	Overall losses	CT	Conference ties	PT	Postseason ties
NC	National championships	OT	Overall ties (Note: Overtime rules in college football were introduced in 1996, making ties impossible in the period since.)	C%	Conference winning percentage		
†	Elected to the College Football Hall of Fame	O%	Overall winning percentage (Note: When computing the win–loss percentage, a tie counts as half a win and half a loss.)				

== Coaches ==
List of head football coaches showing season(s) coached, overall records, conference records, postseason records, championships and selected awards (Note: Statistics correct as of the end of the 2025 NCAA Division I FBS football season.)
No.	Name	Season(s)	GC	OW	OL	OT	O%	CW	CL	CT	C%	PW	PL	PT	DC	CC	NC	Awards
1	Larry Coker	2011–2015	58	26	32	—	0.448	15	15	—	0.500	0	0	—	0	0	0	—
2	Frank Wilson	2016–2019	48	19	29	—	0.396	13	19	—	0.406	0	1	—	0	0	0	—
3	Jeff Traylor	2020–present	79	53	26	—	0.671	35	12	—	0.745	3	3	—	2	2	0	—
