= 2021 Northwestern State Demons football team =

American college football season

2021 Northwestern State Demons football
- Conference: Southland Conference
- Record: 3–8 (3–5 Southland)
- Head coach: Brad Laird (4th season)
- Offensive coordinator: Brad Smiley (4th season)
- Offensive scheme: Spread
- Defensive coordinator: Mike Lucas (5th season)
- Base defense: 3–4
- Home stadium: Harry Turpin Stadium

2021 Southland Conference football standings
	Conf.			Overall
Team	W		L	W		L
No. 12 Incarnate Word $^	7	–	1	10	–	3
No. 15 Southeastern Louisiana ^	6	–	2	9	–	4
Nicholls	5	–	3	6	–	5
McNeese State *	3	–	5	4	–	7
Northwestern State	3	–	5	3	–	8
Houston Baptist	0	–	8	0	–	11
$ – Conference champion; ^ – FCS playoff participant; * – Ineligible for FCS postseason play due to NCAA sanctions; Rankings from STATS Poll

The 2021 Northwestern State Demons football team represented Northwestern State University as a member of the Southland Conference during the 2021 NCAA Division I FCS football season. Led by fourth-year head coach Brad Laird, the Demons compiled an overall record of 3–8 with a mark of 3–5 in conference play, tying for fourth place in the Southland. Northwestern State played home games at Harry Turpin Stadium in Natchitoches, Louisiana.

== Preseason ==
=== Preseason poll ===
The Southland Conference released their preseason poll in July 2021. The Demons were picked to finish fifth in the conference. In addition, nine Demons were chosen to the Preseason All-Southland Team.

=== Preseason All–Southland Teams ===
Offense

1st Team

- Scooter Adams – Running Back, JR

2nd Team

- Khalil Corbett-Canada – Offensive Lineman, SR
- Jakob Sell – Offensive Lineman, JR
- Scotty Roblow – Punter, RS-SO

Defense

1st Team

- Jomard Valsin – Linebacker, JR

2nd Team

- Ja'Quay Pough – Linebacker, SR
- P. J. Herrington – Defensive Back, JR
- William Hooper – Defensive Back, JR
- Donovan Duvernay – Kick Returner, SR

== Schedule ==
Date	Time	Opponent	Site	TV	Result	Attendance
September 4	6:30 p.m.	at North Texas*	Apogee Stadium; Denton, TX	ESPN3	L 14–44	18,716
September 11	6:00 p.m.	at Alcorn State*	Casem-Spinks Stadium; Lorman, MS		L 10–13	0
September 18	6:00 p.m.	UT Martin*	Harry Turpin Stadium; Natchitoches, LA	ESPN+	L 10–35	9,146
October 2	6:00 p.m.	No. 24 Incarnate Word	Harry Turpin Stadium; Natchitoches, LA	ESPN+	L 27–38	6,125
October 9	6:00 p.m.	at Houston Baptist	Husky Stadium; Houston, TX	ESPN+	W 21–17	1,987
October 16	3:00 p.m.	McNeese State	Harry Turpin Stadium; Natchitoches, LA (rivalry)	CST	L 17–35	7,413
October 23	3:00 p.m.	No. 9 Southeastern Louisiana^{†}	Harry Turpin Stadium; Natchitoches, LA (rivalry)	ESPN+	L 14–51	6,523
October 30	12:00 p.m.	at Nicholls	John L. Guidry Stadium; Thibodaux, LA (NSU Challenge)	CST	L 21–42	7,328
November 6	3:00 p.m.	Houston Baptist	Harry Turpin Stadium; Natchitoches, LA	ESPN+	W 28–24	3,621
November 13 (Note: Northwestern State's away game against Southeastern Louisiana was originally scheduled to be played on September 25, but the game was moved on November 13, 2021, due to safety concerns related to Hurricane Ida.)	6:00 p.m.	at No. 14 Southeastern Louisiana	Strawberry Stadium; Hammond, LA	ESPN+	L 28–56	4,137
November 20	12:00 p.m.	at McNeese State	Cowboy Stadium; Lake Charles, LA	ESPN+	W 24–20	8,412
*Non-conference game; ^{†}Homecoming; Rankings from STATS Poll released prior to the game; All times are in Central time

== Game summaries ==
=== At North Texas ===
Northwestern State at North Texas

Team	1	2	3	4	Total
Demons	0	14	0	0	14
• Mean Green	7	17	17	3	44

- Date: September 4, 2021
- Location: Apogee Stadium
  Denton, TX
- Game start: 6:00 p.m. CDT
- Elapsed time:
- Game attendance: 18,716
- Game weather: • Weather: TBD • Wind: TBD
- Referee:
- TV announcers (ESPN3): Jake Rose (play-by-play), Jeremy Kellem (analyst) & Sara Cardona (sideline)

Scoring summary
1
2
3
4

Statistics	Northwestern State	North Texas
First downs	21	29
Total yards	418	527
Rushing yards	261	345
Passing yards	157	182
Turnovers	4	2
Time of possession	32:49	27:21

Team	Category	Player	Statistics
Northwestern State	Passing	Kaleb Fletcher	13/22, 134 yards, TD, INT
Northwestern State	Rushing	Scooter Adams	12 rushes, 92 yards, TD
Northwestern State	Receiving	Kendrick Price	1 reception, 65 yards, TD
North Texas	Passing	Jace Rudder	10/21, 131 yards, TD, 2 INT
North Texas	Rushing	DeAndre Torrey	25 rushes, 244 yards, 3 TD
North Texas	Receiving	Roderic Burns	6 receptions, 114 yards, TD

=== At Alcorn State ===
Northwestern State at Alcorn State

Team	1	2	Total
Demons			0
Braves			0

- Date: September 11, 2021
- Location: Casem-Spinks Stadium
  Lorman, MS
- Game start: TBD CDT
- Elapsed time:
- Game attendance:
- Game weather: • Weather: TBD • Wind: TBD
- Referee:
- TV announcers ( ):

Scoring summary
1
2
3
4

Statistics	Northwestern State	Alcorn State
First downs		
Total yards		
Rushing yards		
Passing yards		
Turnovers		
Time of possession		

Team	Category	Player	Statistics
Northwestern State	Passing		
Northwestern State	Rushing		
Northwestern State	Receiving		
Alcorn State	Passing		
Alcorn State	Rushing		
Alcorn State	Receiving		

=== UT Martin ===
Tennessee–Martin at Northwestern State

Team	1	2	Total
Skyhawks			0
Demons			0

- Date: September 18, 2021
- Location: Harry Turpin Stadium
  Natchitoches, LA
- Game start: 6:00 p.m. CDT
- Elapsed time:
- Game attendance:
- Game weather: • Weather: TBD • Wind: TBD
- Referee:
- TV announcers (ESPN+):

Scoring summary
1
2
3
4

Statistics	UT Martin	Northwestern State
First downs		
Total yards		
Rushing yards		
Passing yards		
Turnovers		
Time of possession		

Team	Category	Player	Statistics
UT Martin	Passing		
UT Martin	Rushing		
UT Martin	Receiving		
Northwestern State	Passing		
Northwestern State	Rushing		
Northwestern State	Receiving		

=== No. 24 Incarnate Word ===
Incarnate Word at Northwestern State

Team	1	2	Total
No. 24 Cardinals			0
Demons			0

- Date: October 2, 2021
- Location: Harry Turpin Stadium
  Natchitoches, LA
- Game start: 6:00 p.m. CDT
- Elapsed time:
- Game attendance:
- Game weather: • Weather: TBD • Wind: TBD
- Referee:
- TV announcers (ESPN+):

Scoring summary
1
2
3
4

Statistics	Incarnate Word	Northwestern State
First downs		
Total yards		
Rushing yards		
Passing yards		
Turnovers		
Time of possession		

Team	Category	Player	Statistics
Incarnate Word	Passing		
Incarnate Word	Rushing		
Incarnate Word	Receiving		
Northwestern State	Passing		
Northwestern State	Rushing		
Northwestern State	Receiving		

=== At Houston Baptist ===
Northwestern State at Houston Baptist

Team	1	2	Total
Demons			0
Huskies			0

- Date: October 9, 2021
- Location: Husky Stadium
  Houston, TX
- Game start: 6:00 p.m. CDT
- Elapsed time:
- Game attendance:
- Game weather: • Weather: TBD • Wind: TBD
- Referee:
- TV announcers (ESPN+):

Scoring summary
1
2
3
4

Statistics	Northwestern State	Houston Baptist
First downs		
Total yards		
Rushing yards		
Passing yards		
Turnovers		
Time of possession		

Team	Category	Player	Statistics
Northwestern State	Passing		
Northwestern State	Rushing		
Northwestern State	Receiving		
Houston Baptist	Passing		
Houston Baptist	Rushing		
Houston Baptist	Receiving		

=== McNeese State ===
McNeese State at Northwestern State

Team	1	2	Total
Cowboys			0
Demons			0

- Date: October 16, 2021
- Location: Harry Turpin Stadium
  Natchitoches, LA
- Game start: 3:00 p.m. CDT
- Elapsed time:
- Game attendance:
- Game weather: • Weather: TBD • Wind: TBD
- Referee:
- TV announcers (CST):

Scoring summary
1
2
3
4

Statistics	McNeese State	Northwestern State
First downs		
Total yards		
Rushing yards		
Passing yards		
Turnovers		
Time of possession		

Team	Category	Player	Statistics
McNeese State	Passing		
McNeese State	Rushing		
McNeese State	Receiving		
Northwestern State	Passing		
Northwestern State	Rushing		
Northwestern State	Receiving		

=== No. 9 Southeastern Louisiana ===
Southeastern Louisiana at Northwestern State

Team	1	2	Total
Lions			0
Demons			0

- Date: October 23, 2021
- Location: Harry Turpin Stadium
  Natchitoches, LA
- Game start: 3:00 p.m. CDT
- Elapsed time:
- Game attendance:
- Game weather: • Weather: TBD • Wind: TBD
- Referee:
- TV announcers (ESPN+):

Scoring summary
1
2
3
4

Statistics	Southeastern Louisiana	Northwestern State
First downs		
Total yards		
Rushing yards		
Passing yards		
Turnovers		
Time of possession		

Team	Category	Player	Statistics
Southeastern Louisiana	Passing		
Southeastern Louisiana	Rushing		
Southeastern Louisiana	Receiving		
Northwestern State	Passing		
Northwestern State	Rushing		
Northwestern State	Receiving		

=== At Nicholls ===
Northwestern State at Nicholls

Team	1	2	Total
Demons			0
Colonels			0

- Date: October 30, 2021
- Location: Manning Field at John L. Guidry Stadium
  Thibodaux, LA
- Game start: 12:00 p.m. CDT
- Elapsed time:
- Game attendance:
- Game weather: • Weather: TBD • Wind: TBD
- Referee:
- TV announcers (CST):

Scoring summary
1
2
3
4

Statistics	Northwestern State	Nicholls
First downs		
Total yards		
Rushing yards		
Passing yards		
Turnovers		
Time of possession		

Team	Category	Player	Statistics
Northwestern State	Passing		
Northwestern State	Rushing		
Northwestern State	Receiving		
Nicholls	Passing		
Nicholls	Rushing		
Nicholls	Receiving		

=== Houston Baptist ===
Houston Baptist at Northwestern State

Team	1	2	Total
Huskies			0
Demons			0

- Date: November 6, 2021
- Location: Harry Turpin Stadium
  Natchitoches, LA
- Game start: 3:00 p.m. CDT
- Elapsed time:
- Game attendance:
- Game weather: • Weather: TBD • Wind: TBD
- Referee:
- TV announcers (ESPN+):

Scoring summary
1
2
3
4

Statistics	Houston Baptist	Northwestern State
First downs		
Total yards		
Rushing yards		
Passing yards		
Turnovers		
Time of possession		

Team	Category	Player	Statistics
Houston Baptist	Passing		
Houston Baptist	Rushing		
Houston Baptist	Receiving		
Northwestern State	Passing		
Northwestern State	Rushing		
Northwestern State	Receiving		

=== At No. 16 Southeastern Louisiana ===
Northwestern State at Southeastern Louisiana

Team	1	2	Total
Demons			0
No. 16 Lions			0

- Date: November 13, 2021
- Location: Strawberry Stadium
  Hammond, LA
- Game start: 6:00 p.m. CDT
- Elapsed time:
- Game attendance:
- Game weather: • Weather: TBD • Wind: TBD
- Referee:
- TV announcers (ESPN+):

Scoring summary
1
2
3
4

Statistics	Northwestern State	Southeastern Louisiana
First downs		
Total yards		
Rushing yards		
Passing yards		
Turnovers		
Time of possession		

Team	Category	Player	Statistics
Northwestern State	Passing		
Northwestern State	Rushing		
Northwestern State	Receiving		
Southeastern Louisiana	Passing		
Southeastern Louisiana	Rushing		
Southeastern Louisiana	Receiving		

=== At McNeese State ===
Northwestern State at McNeese State

Team	1	2	Total
Demons			0
Cowboys			0

- Date: November 20, 2021
- Location: Cowboy Stadium
  Lake Charles, LA
- Game start: 12:00 p.m. CST
- Elapsed time:
- Game attendance:
- Game weather: • Weather: TBD • Wind: TBD
- Referee:
- TV announcers (ESPN+):

Scoring summary
1
2
3
4

Statistics	Northwestern State	McNeese State
First downs		
Total yards		
Rushing yards		
Passing yards		
Turnovers		
Time of possession		

Team	Category	Player	Statistics
Northwestern State	Passing		
Northwestern State	Rushing		
Northwestern State	Receiving		
McNeese State	Passing		
McNeese State	Rushing		
McNeese State	Receiving		

== Personnel ==
2021 Northwestern State Demons football team roster
Players
Coaches
Offense

Pos.	#	Name	Class
WR	0	Gavin Landry	Sr
WR	1	Kendrick Price Jr.	Sr
QB	2	Kaleb Fletcher	Sr
WR	3	LC Greenwood	Sr
WR	4	Javon Antonio	Sr
QB	5	Mark Salazar	Sr
WR	6	Robbie Williams	So
QB	7	Kareame Cotton Jr.	Fr
WR	9	Andy Pierre-Antoine	Sr
WR	10	Marquise Bridges	Sr
WR	11	Jaheim Walters	Fr
QB	13	Zachary Clement	So
WR	14	Coby McGee	Sr
RB	15	Kevin Perkins	Sr
QB	16	Jacob Barrett	Fr
QB	16	Judd Barton	Fr
TE	17	David Fitzwater	Sr
WR	18	Jay Griffin IV	Sr
RB	19	Curtis Williams	Jr
RB	20	Trevor Morgan	Sr
RB	24	Aubrey Scott	So
RB	25	Scooter Adams	Sr
RB	27	Bryce Dealey	Fr
WR	28	Jauron Reid Jr.	Fr
RB	30	Deus Desire	Fr
RB	35	Sirmichael Veasley	Fr
TE	40	Jacob Logan	Sr
RB	42	Jay Sturgis	Fr
TE	43	Jaylon Glosson	Fr
OL	50	Chase Underwood	Fr
OL	52	Cole Jeansonne	Fr
OL	53	Landon Blubaugh	Fr
OL	57	Riley Birdwell	Fr
OL	58	Coby James	Fr
OL	60	Logan Canerdy	Sr
OL	61	Spencer Cody	So
OL	63	Alyzcha Ulufale-Hentz	Jr
OL	64	Brody Heard	Fr
OL	65	Brayden Staggs	So
OL	66	D'Andre Richard	So
OL	67	Jordan Cooper	So
OL	69	Jakob Sell	Sr
OL	70	Cooper Smith	Jr
OL	71	Stevie Ballard	So
OL	72	Khalil Corbett-Canada	Sr
OL	73	Canaan Quinn	Fr
OL	75	Jordan McClaine	Fr
TE	78	Cody Coleman	So
TE	81	Javonis Isaac	Sr
TE	82	Monte Johnson	Fr
WR	83	Josh Carver	So
TE	84	Dylan Fluellen	Fr
WR	85	Gabriel Ernest	So
TE	85	Dane Wallace	Fr
WR	86	Patrick Head	Jr
WR	87	Caleb LaBoy	Sr
WR	88	Stanley King	Jr
WR		Jamarion Lilly	Fr

Defense

Pos.	#	Name	Class
LB	0	Jomard Valsin	Sr
S	1	Tobias Williams	Jr
S	2	PJ Herrington	Sr
CB	3	Shemar Bartholomew	Sr
CB	4	Cedric Anderson	Jr
LB	5	Josh Clarke	Sr
CB	6	Frederick Lee Jr.	Jr
CB	7	William Hooper	Sr
S	8	Donovan Duvernay	Sr
LB	10	Ja'Quay Pough	Sr
S	11	Jacob Washington	Jr
CB	13	AJ Burns	Fr
CB	13	Waylon Washington	Jr
S	14	Cadillac Rhone	Fr
S	15	Tay Coleman	So
CB	18	Dante Thomas	So
LB	19	Kwame Sarkodie	Jr
LB	20	Brandon Floyd	Sr
LB	21	Jared Pedraza	So
LB	22	Adrion Robertson	Sr
S	23	Keenan Leachman	Jr
S	25	Isaiah Robinson	Fr
S	26	Kevin Davis Jr.	So
S	29	Trey Williams	Sr
DL	30	Keshawn Jackson	Jr
LB	31	Junior Brown	Fr
S	32	Ara Rauls III	Fr
DL	33	Isaiah Longino	Sr
LB	35	Kyle Moore	Sr
CB	36	Xa'Vion Mandigo	Fr
S	38	Malik Carey	So
LB	39	Chandler Moncrief	Jr
LB	40	Princeton Malbrue	So
LB	42	Jaeden Ward	So
LB	45	Malik Williams	Jr
CB	46	Ray Johnson	So
LB	47	Riley Bond	Fr
DE	48	John Daigle	So
LB	49	Race Moser	Sr
DL	51	Nathalohn Nanai	Sr
DL	59	Maurice Campbell II	Jr
DL	68	Kendal Harmon	Fr
DL	90	Steve Conerly	Jr
DL	92	Donovan Green	So
DE	93	Ty Cormier	Jr
DL	94	Theron Bellard	So
DL	95	Johnny Mitchell	So
DL	96	Jabralen Yarber	Jr
DL	98	Tyrell Lockett	Fr
DE	99	Darius Whitfield	Sr

Special teams

Pos.	#	Name	Class
K, P	9	Eddie Godina	Sr
K, P	46	Scotty Roblow	So
K	50	Jesus Bravo	Fr
LS	55	Evan Gibson	Jr
P	88	Mark Green	Fr

Head coach

- Brad Laird (Northwestern State)

Coordinators/assistant coaches

- Brad Smiley (Northwestern State)
  Offensive coordinator/te
- Mike Lucas (Liberty)
  Defensive coordinator/ilb
- Rashad Jackson (East Central)
  Special teams coordinator/wr
- De'Von Lockett (Bethel)
  Defensive backs
- Kevon Beckwith (Louisiana)
  Defensive line
- J Pond (Texas A&M)
  Offensive line
- Josh Jones (Arkansas Tech)
  Safeties
- Joey Fitzgerald (Mississippi State)
  Quarterbacks

Legend

- (C) Team captain
- (S) Suspended
- (I) Ineligible
- Injured
- Redshirt

Roster
Last update: 6 August 2021
