= 2021 Southeastern Louisiana Lions football team =

American college football season

2021 Southeastern Louisiana Lions football

NCAA Division I Second Round, L 20–59, vs. James Madison
- Conference: Southland Conference

Ranking
- STATS: No. 15
- FCS Coaches: No. 15
- Record: 9–4 (6–2 Southland)
- Head coach: Frank Scelfo (4th season)
- Offensive coordinator: Greg Stevens (6th season)
- Defensive coordinator: Raymond Monica (1st season)
- Home stadium: Strawberry Stadium

2021 Southland Conference football standings
	Conf.			Overall
Team	W		L	W		L
No. 12 Incarnate Word $^	7	–	1	10	–	3
No. 15 Southeastern Louisiana ^	6	–	2	9	–	4
Nicholls	5	–	3	6	–	5
McNeese State *	3	–	5	4	–	7
Northwestern State	3	–	5	3	–	8
Houston Baptist	0	–	8	0	–	11
$ – Conference champion; ^ – FCS playoff participant; * – Ineligible for FCS postseason play due to NCAA sanctions; Rankings from STATS Poll

The 2021 Southeastern Louisiana Lions football team represented Southeastern Louisiana University as a member of the Southland Conference during the 2021 NCAA Division I FCS football season. The Lions were led by fourth-year head coach Frank Scelfo and played their home games at Strawberry Stadium.

== Preseason ==
=== Preseason poll ===
The Southland Conference released their preseason poll in July 2021. The Lions were picked to finish first in the conference. In addition, sixteen Lions were chosen to the Preseason All-Southland Team.

=== Preseason All–Southland Teams ===
Offense

1st Team

- Cole Kelley – Quarterback, SR
- CJ Turner – Wide Receiver, RS-JR
- Jalen Bell – Offensive Lineman, JR
- Mateo Rengifo – Kicker, SO
- Austin Dunlap – Punter, SO

2nd Team

- Damien Dawson – Tight End/Halfback, RS-SR
- Austin Mitchell – Wide Receiver, RS-SR
- Ethan McMullan – Offensive Lineman, SR
- Rendon Miles-Character – Offensive Lineman, SR
- Drew Jones – Offensive Lineman, SR

Defense

1st Team

- Darrius Harry – Defensive Lineman, RS-FR
- Alexis Ramos – Linebacker, SR
- Ferlando Jordan – Defensive Back, RS-JR
- Donnell Ward-McGee – Defensive Back, JR

2nd Team

- Herman Christophe – Linebacker, SO
- Jack Henderson – Defensive Back, FR

== Personnel ==
2021 Southeastern Louisiana Lions football team roster
Players
Coaches
Offense

Pos.	#	Name	Class
RB	0	Damien Dawson	Sr
WR	1	Brennon Dingle	Sr
WR	3	Anthony Spurlock	So
WR	4	Austin Mitchell	Sr
QB	5	Cephus Johnson III	Jr
WR	6	Nick Kovacs	Jr
WR	7	Terrell Carter	Jr
WR	9	Tim Wilson Jr	Jr
WR	10	Maurice Massey	Fr
QB	12	Bauer Sharp	Fr
TE	13	Jordan Loving	So
QB	14	Jacob Switzer	Fr
QB	15	Cole Kelley	Sr
WR	16	Justin Wendt	Jr
QB	18	Christian Westcott	Fr
QB	19	Eli Sawyer	Fr
RB	20	Jordan Griffin	So
RB	22	Taron Jones	Jr
WR	23	Jett Booker	Fr
WR	24	Calvin Jones	Fr
RB	25	Jessie Britt	Jr
WR	27	Corey Lorio	Fr
RB	29	Joseph Wilson	Fr
RB	33	Jahmon McClendon	Fr
TE	38	Ivan Drobocky	Fr
TE	44	Connor Briggs	Fr
OL	52	Javin Turner	Fr
OL	53	Holden Kareokowsky	Fr
OL	54	Tyree' Rhodes	Jr
OL	55	John Allen	So
OL	56	Brockhim Wicks	Fr
OL	61	Rendon Miles-Character	Sr
OL	62	William Granville	So
OL	63	Dom Serapiglia III	Fr
OL	64	Noah Devlin	Fr
OL	68	Cayden Guzzardo	Fr
OL	70	Ethan McMullan	Sr
OL	71	Gavin Burtchaell	Fr
OL	72	Brennan Lanclos	So
OL	73	Jhy Orgeron	Fr
OL	74	Jalen Bell	Jr
OL	75	Blakely Miller	Fr
OL	79	Drew Jones	Sr
WR	80	Da'Shun Hughley	Fr
WR	81	Malik Hillard	Fr
WR	82	Gage Larvadain	Fr
WR	83	CJ Turner	Jr
TE	84	Spencer Owens	Jr
TE	85	Tanner Olsen	So
WR	86	Ed Magee	So
WR	87	Reginald Patterson Jr.	Fr
TE	88	Nolan Givan	Sr
TE	89	Cade Collier	Fr

Defense

Pos.	#	Name	Class
DB	2	Ferlando Jordan	Jr
DB	6	Coryell Pierce	Fr
DB	8	Donniel Ward-Magee	Jr
DB	11	Matt Wright	Sr
DB	12	Champ Craven	Fr
DB	13	Markell Linzer	Fr
DB	14	Zy Alexander	Fr
DB	16	Justin Dumas	Fr
LB	17	Chinedu Ogbonna	Sr
DB	20	Jack Henderson	Fr
DB	21	Brandon Barbee	Jr
DB	23	Blayne Delahoussaye	Fr
DB	24	Alphonso Taylor	So
DB	25	Taquan Thomas	Fr
DB	26	Mark Clement	Fr
DB	27	Justin Douglas	So
DB	28	Tyrone Legette	So
LB	30	Alexis Ramos	Sr
DB	31	Robert Buquoi	Fr
LB	32	Mike Mason	Sr
LB	33	Max Jubenville	Fr
LB	34	Arlen Williams	So
DB	38	Calvin Watson Jr.	Fr
LB	39	Gerald Henderson	Fr
LB	40	Gerald Nathan	So
LB	41	Kevin Bickham	Fr
DB	41	Taylor Martin	Fr
DB	42	Edward Wilson	Fr
LB	43	Donte' Daniels	Fr
DL	45	Garrett Crawford	So
LB	46	Herman Christophe	So
LB	47	David Ellis	Fr
LB	48	Dominic Lamm	So
DL	49	Sci Martin	Sr
LB	50	Tommy Lee	Fr
LB	57	Josh Cook	So
DL	58	Rodney Sopsher	So
DL	65	Kaleb Hogg	So
DL	78	Brendon Kelley	So
DL	90	Bryce Cage	Fr
LB	91	Darrius Harry	Fr
DL	92	Nelson Jenkins III	So
DL	93	Kam Johnson	Fr
DL	94	Cherif Seye	So
DL	96	Dalton Allen	Fr
DL	97	Tyrik Mitchell	Fr
DL	98	Cullan Scott	Fr
DL	99	John Graves III	So

Special teams

Pos.	#	Name	Class
P	26	Austin Dunlap	So
K, P	33	Nathan Holliday	So
K	36	Mateo Rengifo	So
P, K	42	Aubrey Bishop	Fr
LS	51	Korey Karbowsky	Fr
LS	59	Jake Rotenberry	Jr

Head coach

- Frank Scelfo (Northeast Louisiana)

Coordinators/assistant coaches

- Greg Stevens (Eastern Oregon)
  Offensive coordinator/qb
- Raymond Monica (North Alabama)
  Defensive coordinator/lb
- Ross Jenkins (Louisiana Tech)
  Special teams coordinator
- A. J. Hopp (Slippery Rock)
  Run game coordinator/ol
- Anthony Scelfo (Tulane)
  Pass game coordinator/recruiting coordinator/te
- Giovanni Vizza (Texas A&M)
  Wide receivers
- Albert Poree (Georgia Tech)
  Running backs
- Bill D'Ottavio (Millersville)
  Safeties
- Del Lee-Collins (McNeese State)
  Cornerbacks
- Antonio Baker (Louisiana Tech)
  Nickelbacks

Legend

- (C) Team captain
- (S) Suspended
- (I) Ineligible
- Injured
- Redshirt

Roster
Last update: 8 August 2021

== Schedule ==
Date	Time	Opponent	Rank	Site	TV	Result	Attendance
September 4	6:00 p.m.	at North Alabama*	No. 15	Braly Municipal Stadium; Florence, AL (Note: Southeastern Louisiana's game against North Alabama was originally scheduled to be played as a home game, in Hammond, but the game was moved to Florence, Alabama on August 31, 2021, due to safety concerns related to Hurricane Ida.)	ESPN3	W 49–28	3,433
September 11	6:00 p.m.	at Louisiana Tech*	No. 13	Joe Aillet Stadium; Ruston, LA	ESPN3	L 42–45	15,328
September 18	11:00 a.m.	at Central Connecticut*	No. 15	Arute Field; New Britain, CT		W 56–10	3,117
October 2	12:00 p.m.	at McNeese State	No. 14	Cowboy Stadium; Lake Charles, LA	ESPN+	W 38–35	6,044
October 9	12:00 p.m.	at No. 25 Nicholls	No. 14	John L. Guidry Stadium; Thibodaux, LA (River Bell Classic)	ESPN+	W 58–48	7,402
October 16	4:00 p.m.	Houston Baptist^{†}	No. 11	Strawberry Stadium; Hammond, LA	ESPN+	W 61–24	7,389
October 23	3:00 p.m.	at Northwestern State	No. 9	Harry Turpin Stadium; Natchitoches, LA (rivalry)	ESPN+	W 51–14	6,523
October 30	6:00 p.m.	McNeese State	No. 8	Strawberry Stadium; Hammond, LA	ESPN+	W 23–20	4,185
November 6	2:00 p.m.	at No. 22 Incarnate Word	No. 6	Gayle and Tom Benson Stadium; San Antonio, TX	ESPN+	L 52–55	3,220
November 13 (Note: Southeastern Louisiana's home game against Northwestern State was originally scheduled to be played on September 25, but the game was moved on November 13, 2021, due to safety concerns related to Hurricane Ida.)	6:00 p.m.	Northwestern State	No. 14	Strawberry Stadium; Hammond, LA (rivalry)	ESPN+	W 56–28	4,137
November 18	6:00 p.m.	Nicholls	No. 15	Strawberry Stadium; Hammond, LA (River Bell Classic)	ESPN+	L 42–45	6,057
November 27	7:00 p.m.	No. 22 Florida A&M*	No. 18	Strawberry Stadium; Hammond, LA (FCS Playoffs First Round)	ESPN+	W 38–14	4,125
December 4	1:00 p.m.	at No. 2 James Madison*	No. 18	Bridgeforth Stadium; Harrisonburg, VA (FCS Playoffs Second Round)	ESPN+	L 20–59	11,743
*Non-conference game; ^{†}Homecoming; Rankings from STATS Poll released prior to the game; All times are in Central time

== Game summaries ==
=== at North Alabama ===
Southeastern Louisiana at North Alabama

Team	1	2	3	4	Total
• No. 15 SLU Lions	7	7	13	22	49
UNA Lions	0	14	7	7	28

- Date: September 4, 2021
- Location: Braly Municipal Stadium
  Florence, AL
- Game start: 6:00 p.m. CDT
- Elapsed time: 3 hours and 36 minutes
- Game attendance: 3,433
- Game weather: • Weather: TBD • Wind: TBD
- Referee: Drew Myers
- TV announcers (ESPN3):

Scoring summary
1	0:43	SLU	Nolan Givan 4-yard pass from Cole Kelley (Mateo Rengifo kick) (7 plays, 67 yards, 3:24)	SLU 7–0
2	13:03	UNA	Corson Swan 29-yard pass from Jaylen Gipson (Sam Contorno kick) (1 play, 29 yards, 0:13)	TIED 7–7
2	6:12	SLU	Cephus Johnson III 13-yard pass from Cole Kelley (Mateo Rengifo kick) (17 plays, 68 yards, 6:51)	SLU 14–7
2	1:39	UNA	Kennebrew Tak. 40-yard pass from Jaylen Gipson (Easterling Gra. kick) (8 plays, 75 yards, 4:33)	TIED 14–14
3	11:40	SLU	Austi Mitchell 1-yard pass from Cole Kelley (Mateo Rengifo kick failed) (7 plays, 61 yards, 3:20)	SLU 20–14
3	9:37	UNA	Takairee Kennebrew 47-yard pass from Jaylen Gipson (Easterling Gra. kick) (4 plays, 75 yards, 2:03)	UNA 21–20
3	6:37	SLU	Taron Jones 3-yard run (Mateo Rengifo kick) (7 plays, 75 yards, 3:00)	SLU 27–21
4	13:07	SLU	Cole Kelley 9-yard run (Nolan Givan pass) (13 plays, 99 yards, 6:29)	SLU 35–21
4	12:38	SLU	Ferland Jordan 41-yard interception (Mateo Rengifo kick)	SLU 42–21
4	10:21	UNA	Takairee Kennebrew 24-yard pass from Jaylen Gipson (Easterling Gra. kick) (8 plays, 75 yards, 2:17)	SLU 42–28
4	0:44	SLU	Cephus Johnson III 15-yard run (Mateo Rengifo kick) (6 plays, 79 yards, 3:38)	SLU 49–28

Statistics	Southeastern Louisiana	North Alabama
First downs	30	23
Total yards	495	404
Rushing yards	232	54
Passing yards	263	350
Turnovers	2	1
Time of possession	36:49	23:11

Team	Category	Player	Statistics
Southeastern Louisiana	Passing	Cole Kelley	30/41, 263 yards, 3 TD
Southeastern Louisiana	Rushing	Taron Jones	11 carries, 85 yards, 1 TD
Southeastern Louisiana	Receiving	CJ Turner	3 receptions, 52 yards
North Alabama	Passing	Jaylen Gipson	23/46, 350 yards, 4 TD, 1 INT
North Alabama	Rushing	Jaylen Gipson	7 carries, 22 yards
North Alabama	Receiving	Takairee Kennebrew	7 receptions, 132 yards, 3 TD

=== At Louisiana Tech ===
Southeastern Louisiana at Louisiana Tech

Team	1	2	3	4	Total
No. 13 Lions	7	14	14	7	42
• Bulldogs	14	10	14	7	45

- Date: September 11, 2021
- Location: Joe Aillet Stadium
  Ruston, LA
- Game start: 6:00 p.m. CDT
- Elapsed time:
- Game attendance: 15,328
- Game weather: • Weather: Sunny • Wind: TBD
- Referee: Kevin Vicknair
- TV announcers (ESPN3): Lyn Rollins and Chris Mycoskie

Scoring summary
1	8:16	LT	BeeJay Williamson 45-yard interceptions return (Jacob Barnes kick)	LT 7–0
1	4:06	SELA	Tim Wilson Jr. 4-yard pass from Cole Kelley (Mateo Rengifo kick) (12 plays, 91 yards, 4:02)	TIED 7–7
1	0:33	LT	Greg Garner 4-yard run (Jacob Barnes kick) (12 plays, 86 yards, 3:27)	LT 14–7
2	12:11	SELA	Taron Jones 2-yard run (Mateo Rengifo) (6 plays, 75 yards, 3:22)	TIED 14–14
2	8:04	LT	Austin Kendall 2-yard run (Jacob Barnes kick) (10 plays, 75 yards, 4:07)	LT 21–14
2	4:33	LT	Jacob Barnes 44-yard field goal (6 plays, 9 yards, 2:19)	LT 24–14
2	0:22	SELA	Cole Kelley 1-yard run (Mateo Rengifo kick) (14 plays, 91 yards, 4:07)	LT 24–21
3	12:19	LT	Greg Garner 33-yard pass from Kyle Maxwell (Jacob Barnes kick) (8 plays, 84 yards, 2:34)	LT 31–21
3	11:12	SELA	C. J. Turner 47-yard pass from Cole Kelley (Mateo Rengifo kick) (3 plays, 75 yards, 1:07)	LT 31–28
3	8:10	LT	Greg Garner 1-yard run (Jacob Barnes kick) (9 plays, 75 yards, 3:02)	LT 38–28
3	1:33	SELA	Austin Mitchell 9-yard pass from Cole Kelley (Mateo Rengifo kick) (12 plays, 75 yards, 6:37)	LT 38–35
4	9:51	LT	Tre Harris 21-yard pass from Austin Kendall (Jacob Barnes kick) (9 plays, 93 yards, 4:17)	LT 45–35
4	4:22	SELA	Cole Kelley 4-yard run (Mateo Rengifo kick) (14 plays, 75 yards, 5:29)	LT 45–42

Statistics	Southeastern Louisiana	Louisiana Tech
First downs	32	23
Total yards	598	448
Rushing yards	103	198
Passing yards	495	250
Turnovers	3	1
Time of possession	32:48	27:12

Team	Category	Player	Statistics
Southeastern Louisiana	Passing	Cole Kelley	44/59, 495 yards, 3 TD, 2 INT
Southeastern Louisiana	Rushing	Cole Kelley	14 carries, 42 yards, 2 TD
Southeastern Louisiana	Receiving	C. J. Turner	8 receptions, 131 yards, TD
Louisiana Tech	Passing	Austin Kendall	19/27, 217 yards, TD, INT
Louisiana Tech	Rushing	Marcus Williams Jr.	18 carries, 99 yards
Louisiana Tech	Receiving	Tre Harris	4 receptions, 72 yards, TD

=== At Central Connecticut ===
Southeastern Louisiana at Central Connecticut State

Team	1	2	Total
No. 15 Lions			0
Blue Devils			0

- Date: September 18, 2021
- Location: Arute Field
  New Britain, CT
- Game start: 11:00 a.m. CDT
- Elapsed time:
- Game attendance: 3,117
- Game weather: • Weather: TBD • Wind: TBD
- Referee:
- TV announcers ( ):

Scoring summary
1
2
3
4

Statistics	Southeastern Louisiana	Central Connecticut
First downs		
Total yards		
Rushing yards		
Passing yards		
Turnovers		
Time of possession		

Team	Category	Player	Statistics
Southeastern Louisiana	Passing		
Southeastern Louisiana	Rushing		
Southeastern Louisiana	Receiving		
Central Connecticut	Passing		
Central Connecticut	Rushing		
Central Connecticut	Receiving		

=== At McNeese State ===
Southeastern Louisiana at McNeese State

Team	1	2	3	4	Total
• No. 14 Lions	14	10	7	7	38
Cowboys	7	0	14	14	35

- Date: October 2, 2021
- Location: Cowboys Stadium
  Lake Charles, LA
- Game start: 12:00 p.m. CDT
- Elapsed time: 3:36
- Game attendance: 6,044
- Game weather: 79 °F (26 °C) • Weather: Cloudy • Wind: SE 9
- Referee: Ed Bourgeois
- TV announcers (CST/ESPN+):

Scoring summary
1
2
3
4

Statistics	Southeastern Louisiana	McNeese State
First downs		
Total yards		
Rushing yards		
Passing yards		
Turnovers		
Time of possession		

Team	Category	Player	Statistics
Southeastern Louisiana	Passing		
Southeastern Louisiana	Rushing		
Southeastern Louisiana	Receiving		
McNeese State	Passing		
McNeese State	Rushing		
McNeese State	Receiving		

=== At No. 25 Nicholls ===
Southeastern Louisiana at Nicholls

Team	1	2	3	4	Total
• No. 14 Lions	7	24	14	13	58
No. 25 Colonels	7	7	21	13	48

- Date: October 9, 2021
- Location: Manning Field at John L. Guidry Stadium
  Thibodaux, LA
- Game start: 12:00 p.m. CDT
- Elapsed time: 3:17
- Game attendance: 7,402
- Game weather: 83 °F (28 °C) • Weather: Clear and sunny • Wind: 2mph NNE
- Referee: Gary Leeper
- TV announcers (ESPN+):

Scoring summary
1
2
3
4

Statistics	Southeastern Louisiana	Nicholls
First downs	32	26
Total yards	573	507
Rushing yards	167	209
Passing yards	406	298
Turnovers	1	0
Time of possession	37:51	22:09

Team	Category	Player	Statistics
Southeastern Louisiana	Passing		
Southeastern Louisiana	Rushing		
Southeastern Louisiana	Receiving		
Nicholls	Passing		
Nicholls	Rushing		
Nicholls	Receiving		

=== Houston Baptist ===
Houston Baptist at Southeastern Louisiana

Team	1	2	Total
Huskies			0
No. 11 Lions			0

- Date: October 16, 2021
- Location: Strawberry Stadium
  Hammond, LA
- Game start: 4:00 p.m. CDT
- Elapsed time:
- Game attendance: 7,389
- Game weather: • Weather: TBD • Wind: TBD
- Referee:
- TV announcers (ESPN+):

Scoring summary
1
2
3
4

Statistics	Houston Baptist	Southeastern Louisiana
First downs		
Total yards		
Rushing yards		
Passing yards		
Turnovers		
Time of possession		

Team	Category	Player	Statistics
Houston Baptist	Passing		
Houston Baptist	Rushing		
Houston Baptist	Receiving		
Southeastern Louisiana	Passing		
Southeastern Louisiana	Rushing		
Southeastern Louisiana	Receiving		

=== At Northwestern State ===
Southeastern Louisiana at Northwestern State

Team	1	2	Total
No. 9 Lions			0
Demons			0

- Date: October 23, 2021
- Location: Harry Turpin Stadium
  Natchitoches, LA
- Game start: 3:00 p.m. CDT
- Elapsed time:
- Game attendance: 6,523
- Game weather: • Weather: TBD • Wind: TBD
- Referee:
- TV announcers (ESPN+):

Scoring summary
1
2
3
4

Statistics	Southeastern Louisiana	Northwestern State
First downs		
Total yards		
Rushing yards		
Passing yards		
Turnovers		
Time of possession		

Team	Category	Player	Statistics
Southeastern Louisiana	Passing		
Southeastern Louisiana	Rushing		
Southeastern Louisiana	Receiving		
Northwestern State	Passing		
Northwestern State	Rushing		
Northwestern State	Receiving		

=== McNeese State ===
McNeese State at Southeastern Louisiana

Team	1	2	3	4	Total
Cowboys	7	0	0	13	20
• No. 8 Lions	3	0	7	13	23

- Date: October 30, 2021
- Location: Strawberry Stadium
  Hammond, LA
- Game start: 6:00 p.m. CDT
- Elapsed time: 3:20
- Game attendance: 4,185
- Game weather: 65 °F (18 °C) • Weather: Clear • Wind: NW 7
- Referee: Craig Heiser
- TV announcers (ESPN+):

Scoring summary
1
2
3
4

Statistics	McNeese State	Southeastern Louisiana
First downs		
Total yards		
Rushing yards		
Passing yards		
Turnovers		
Time of possession		

Team	Category	Player	Statistics
McNeese State	Passing		
McNeese State	Rushing		
McNeese State	Receiving		
Southeastern Louisiana	Passing		
Southeastern Louisiana	Rushing		
Southeastern Louisiana	Receiving		

=== At No. 22 Incarnate Word ===
Southeastern Louisiana at Incarnate Word

Team	1	2	3	4	Total
No. 6 Lions	7	10	21	14	52
• No. 22 Cardinals	7	21	14	13	55

- Date: November 6, 2021
- Location: Gayle and Tom Benson Stadium
  San Antonio, TX
- Game start: 2:00 p.m. CDT
- Elapsed time: 3 hours and 53 minutes
- Game attendance: 3,220
- Game weather: 68 °F (20 °C) • Weather: Clear, Sunny • Wind: SE 2 mph
- Referee: Ed Bourgeois
- TV announcers (ESPN+): David Saltzman (play-by-play), Taylor McHargue (analyst), Lainie Fritz (sideline)

Scoring summary
1	5:10	UIW	Taylor Grimes 16-yard pass from Cameron Ward (Carson Mohr kick) (3 plays, 79 yards, 0:58)	UIW 7–7
1	0:07	SLU	Cole Kelley 4-yard run (Mateo Rengifo kick) (11 plays, 77 yards, 4:56)	TIED 7–7
2	14:18	UIW	Darion Chafin 31-yard pass from Cameron Ward (Carson Mohr kick) (7 plays, 75 yards, 0:49)	UIW 14–7
2	10:52	SLU	Mateo Rengifo 36-yard field goal (10 plays, 60 yards, 3:20)	UIW 14–10
2	4:58	UIW	Robert Ferrel 2-yard pass from Cameron Ward (Carson Mohr kick) (9 plays, 79 yards, 2:58)	UIW 21–10
2	1:31	SLU	Nolan Givan 7-yard pass from Cole Kelley (Mateo Rengifo kick) (10 plays, 65 yards, 3:27)	UIW 21–17
2	0:20	UIW	Darion Chafin 6-yard pass form Cameron Ward (Carson Mohr kick) (8 plays, 75 yards, 2:46)	UIW 28–17
3	12:14	SLU	Cole Kelley 3-yard run (Mateo Rengifo kick) (6 plays, 75 yards, 2:46)	UIW 28–24
3	10:27	UIW	Taylor Grimes 25-yard pass from Cameron Ward (Carson Mohr kick) (6 plays, 82 yards, 1:40)	UIW 35–24
3	7:30	SLU	Austin Mitchell 49-yard pass from Cole Kelley (Mateo Rengifo kick) (7 plays, 75 yards, 2:57)	UIW 35–31
3	6:40	UIW	CJ Hardy 37-yard pass from Cameron Ward (Carson Mohr kick) (5 plays, 73 yards, 0:50)	UIW 42–31
3	2:36	SLU	Gage Larvadain 10-yard pass from Cole Kelley (Mateo Rengifo kick) (11 plays, 75 yards, 4:04)	UIW 42–38
4	11:22	SLU	Taron Jones 2-yard run (Mateo Rengifo kick) (11 plays, 87 yards, 4:12)	SLU 45–42
4	4:05	UIW	Kevin Brown 80-yard pass from Cameron Ward (Carson Mohr kick) (4 plays, 91 yards, 1:14)	UIW 49–45
4	1:55	SLU	Cole Kelley 4-yard run (Mateo Rengifo kick) (5 plays, 75 yards, 2:10)	SLU 52–49
4	0:25	UIW	Robert Ferrel 24-yard pass from Cameron Ward (Carson Mohr kick failed) (9 plays, 75 yards, 1:30)	UIW 55–52

Statistics	Southeastern Louisiana	Incarnate Word
First downs	44	29
Total yards	774	711
Rushing yards	127	95
Passing yards	647	616
Turnovers	0	2
Time of possession	42:22	17:38

Team	Category	Player	Statistics
Southeastern Louisiana	Passing	Cole Kelley	50/68, 647 yards, 3 TD
Southeastern Louisiana	Rushing	Taron Jones	10 carries, 56 yards, 1 TD
Southeastern Louisiana	Receiving	Austin Mitchell	9 receptions, 169 yards, 1 TD
Incarnate Word	Passing	Cam Ward	34/52, 610 yards, 7 TD, 1 INT
Incarnate Word	Rushing	Kevin Brown	6 carries, 65 yards
Incarnate Word	Receiving	Taylor Grimes	12 receptions, 193 yards, 2 TD

=== Northwestern State ===
Northwestern State at Southeastern Louisiana

Team	1	2	Total
Demons			0
No. 16 Lions			0

- Date: November 13, 2021
- Location: Strawberry Stadium
  Hammond, LA
- Game start: 6:00 p.m. CDT
- Elapsed time:
- Game attendance: 4,137
- Game weather: • Weather: TBD • Wind: TBD
- Referee:
- TV announcers (ESPN+):

Scoring summary
1
2
3
4

Statistics	Northwestern State	Southeastern Louisiana
First downs		
Total yards		
Rushing yards		
Passing yards		
Turnovers		
Time of possession		

Team	Category	Player	Statistics
Northwestern State	Passing		
Northwestern State	Rushing		
Northwestern State	Receiving		
Southeastern Louisiana	Passing		
Southeastern Louisiana	Rushing		
Southeastern Louisiana	Receiving		

=== Nicholls ===
Nicholls at Southeastern Louisiana

Team	1	2	3	4	Total
• Colonels	21	0	17	7	45
No. 15 Lions	14	14	0	14	42

- Date: November 18, 2021
- Location: Strawberry Stadium
  Hammond, LA
- Game start: 6:00 p.m. CST
- Elapsed time: 3:45
- Game attendance: 6,057
- Game weather: 59 °F (15 °C) • Weather: Cloudy • Wind: N13mph
- Referee: Gary Leeper
- TV announcers (ESPN+):

Scoring summary
1
2
3
4

Statistics	Nicholls	Southeastern Louisiana
First downs	28	26
Total yards	556	496
Rushing yards	292	111
Passing yards	264	385
Turnovers	2	1
Time of possession	33:29	26:31

Team	Category	Player	Statistics
Nicholls	Passing		
Nicholls	Rushing		
Nicholls	Receiving		
Southeastern Louisiana	Passing		
Southeastern Louisiana	Rushing		
Southeastern Louisiana	Receiving		

== FCS Playoffs ==
=== Vs. No. 22 Florida A&M – first round ===
	1	2	3	4	Total
No. 22 Florida A&M	0	0	0	14	14
No. 18 Lions	7	17	7	7	38

=== At No. 3 Dukes – second round ===
	1	2	3	4	Total
No. 18 Lions	10	3	0	7	20
No. 3 Dukes	14	24	21	0	59
