= 2021 Houston Baptist Huskies football team =

American college football season

2021 Houston Baptist Huskies football
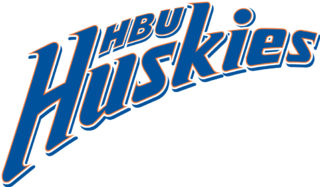
- Conference: Southland Conference
- Record: 0–11 (0–8 Southland)
- Head coach: Vic Shealy (9th season)
- Offensive coordinator: Cedric Cormier (1st season)
- Offensive scheme: Air raid
- Defensive coordinator: Shane Eachus (1st season)
- Co-defensive coordinator: Roger Hinshaw (9th season)
- Base defense: Multiple
- Home stadium: Husky Stadium

2021 Southland Conference football standings
	Conf.			Overall
Team	W		L	W		L
No. 12 Incarnate Word $^	7	–	1	10	–	3
No. 15 Southeastern Louisiana ^	6	–	2	9	–	4
Nicholls	5	–	3	6	–	5
McNeese State *	3	–	5	4	–	7
Northwestern State	3	–	5	3	–	8
Houston Baptist	0	–	8	0	–	11
$ – Conference champion; ^ – FCS playoff participant; * – Ineligible for FCS postseason play due to NCAA sanctions; Rankings from STATS Poll

The 2021 Houston Baptist Huskies football team represented Houston Baptist University—now known as Houston Christian University—as a member of the Southland Conference during the 2021 NCAA Division I FCS football season. Led by ninth-year head coach Vic Shealy the Huskies compiled an overall record of 0–11 with a mark of 0–8 in conference play, placing last out of six teams in the Southland. Houston Baptist played home games at Husky Stadium in Houston.

== Preseason ==
=== Preseason poll ===
The Southland Conference released their preseason poll in July 2021. The Huskies were picked to finish sixth in the conference. In addition, six Huskies were chosen to the Preseason All-Southland Team.

=== Preseason All–Southland Teams ===
Offense

1st Team

- Christian Hood – Offensive Lineman, SO

2nd Team

- Dreshawn Minnieweather – Running Back, SR

Defense

1st Team

- Patrick Wolfe – Defensive Back, SR

2nd Team

- Segun Ijiyera – Defensive Lineman, JR
- Philip Ossai – Defensive Lineman, SO
- Brennan Young – Linebacker, JR

== Personnel ==
2021 Houston Baptist Huskies football team roster
Players
Coaches
Offense

Pos.	#	Name	Class
WR	1	Tyson Thompson	Fr
RB	2	Ean Beek	Jr
TE	3	Coleman Robinson	Sr
WR	5	DJ Dormeus	So
WR	6	Darrion Sherfield	Fr
WR	7	Aaron Marquez	Jr
QB	7	Christian Pack	Fr
QB	10	Desmond Young	Fr
WR	11	Branden Walker	So
WR	12	Jaylon Johnson	Jr
WR	14	Vernon Harrell	So
TE	15	Josh Alfaro	Jr
WR	17	Ismael Fuller	Fr
QB	18	Blaise Bentsen	Fr
WR	19	Jaylon Coleman	Fr
RB	20	Ladarius Dickens	Sr
WR	23	Nathan Culbreath	Fr
WR	24	Lane Botkin	Sr
RB	24	RJ Smith	Fr
RB	25	Fudge Woods	Fr
RB	27	Darryle Evans	Fr
RB	28	Dreshawn Minnieweather	Sr
OL	55	Christian Hood	So
OL	62	Victor Buenrostro	So
OL	65	Jade Ashalintubbi	So
OL	68	Dylan McCreery	Jr
OL	70	Nathan Morrow	So
OL	71	William Brewer	Jr
OL	75	Gabriel Martinez	Jr
OL	76	Spencer Blake	Jr
OL	77	Edouard Paradis	So
OL	77	Kendal Septs	Fr
WR		Isaiah Bibb	Fr
RB		Xzavier Ford	Fr
WR		Saleim Kahleh	Fr
QB		Orion Olivas	Fr

Defense

Pos.	#	Name	Class
S	1	Patrick Wolfe	Sr
CB	2	Keaton Dickey	So
S	3	Isaiah Cash	Fr
CB	5	Coi Miller	Jr
CB	6	Fred Johnson Jr.	Fr
DL	7	Luke Horner	Fr
S	8	Colton Manning	Jr
DL	10	Segun Ijiyera	Jr
CB	11	Devion Hargrove	Fr
LB	13	Danny Lenard II	So
S	14	Corey Smooth	Fr
LB	15	Christian Guillory	So
CB	16	Delon Smith	Sr
S	18	Joshua Graham	Fr
S	19	Darius St. Cyr	So
CB	20	Kenneth Kemp	Fr
CB	21	Joel Davila	Fr
CB	22	Channing Canada	So
CB	24	Donovan Sanders	Fr
CB	25	Derrick Wilson	So
CB	26	Tekaari Slaughter	So
DB	27	Dameon Dawson	So
LB	28	Ethan McCollum	Fr
LB	29	Peyton Kennedy	Fr
LB	30	Archie Bijou	So
LB	33	Cole Averette	So
LB	34	David Williams	Fr
LB	41	Jeremy Ardoin	Sr
LB	42	Brennan Young	Jr
LB	43	Christian Hart	So
DL	45	Vejon Wallis	Sr
DE	46	Carter Couch	Sr
DL	47	Chase Stokes	So
DL	48	Philip Ossai	So
DL	49	Delvin Mason	Jr
DL	90	Kyler Baugh	So
DL	92	Lordswill Uwa-Ndukwe	Fr
DL	94	Chad Opoku	Jr
S		Marcus Edwards	Fr
DT		Joe Marino	Jr

Special teams

Pos.	#	Name	Class
LS	31	Kaleb Halfmann	Fr
LS	36	Garrett Scott	Jr
K	37	Gino Garcia	So
K	38	Cade Hill	So
P		Brady Buell	Jr

Head coach

- Vic Shealy (Richmond)

Coordinators/assistant coaches

- Cedric Cormier (Colorado)
  Offensive coordinator/inside receivers
- Shane Eachus (James Madison)
  Defensive coordinator/s
- Roger Hinshaw (Appalachian State)
  Co-defensive coordinator/lb
- Tyler Schovanec (Case Western)
  Special teams coordinator/rb
- Jared Kaster (Texas Tech)
  Run game coordinator/ol
- Kendrick Kitchens (Jackson State)
  Wide receivers
- Gabe Lynn (Oklahoma)
  Cornerbacks
- Issac Mooring (North Carolina)
  Defensive linemen
- Drake Smithton (Oklahoma State)
  Quarterbacks

Legend

- (C) Team captain
- (S) Suspended
- (I) Ineligible
- Injured
- Redshirt

Roster
Last update: 18 July 2021

== Schedule ==
Date	Time	Opponent	Site	Result	Attendance
September 2	7:00 p.m.	at New Mexico*	University Stadium; Albuquerque, NM	L 17–27	15,908
September 11	6:00 p.m.	Northern Colorado*	Husky Stadium; Houston, TX	L 13–45	2,135
September 18	6:00 p.m.	at Prairie View A&M*	Panther Stadium at Blackshear Field; Prairie View, TX	L 27–37	8,476
October 2	3:00 p.m.	at Nicholls	Manning Field at John L. Guidry Stadium; Thibodaux, LA	L 17–48	5,840
October 9	7:00 p.m.	Northwestern State	Husky Stadium; Houston, TX	L 17–21	1,987
October 16	4:00 p.m.	at No. 11 Southeastern Louisiana	Strawberry Stadium; Hammond, LA	L 24–61	7,389
October 23	7:00 p.m.	Nicholls	Husky Stadium; Houston, TX	L 14–44	2,362
October 30	3:00 p.m.	at No. 22 Incarnate Word	Gayle and Tom Benson Stadium; San Antonio, TX	L 21–49	2,711
November 6	3:00 p.m.	at Northwestern State	Harry Turpin Stadium; Natchitoches, LA	L 24–28	3,621
November 13	2:00 p.m.	McNeese State^{†}	Husky Stadium; Houston, TX	L 3–44	2,325
November 20	2:00 p.m.	No. 18 Incarnate Word	Husky Stadium; Houston, TX	L 14–55	1,931
*Non-conference game; ^{†}Homecoming; Rankings from STATS Poll released prior to the game; All times are in Central time

== Game summaries ==
=== At New Mexico ===
Houston Baptist at New Mexico

Team	1	2	3	4	Total
Huskies	0	10	0	7	17
• Lobos	14	7	3	3	27

- Date: September 2, 2021
- Location: University Stadium
  Albuquerque, NM
- Game start: 7:00 p.m. CDT
- Elapsed time: 3 hours and 3 minutes
- Game attendance: 15,908
- Game weather: • Weather: Sunny • Wind: TBD
- Referee: Cal McNeill
- TV announcers (KASY-TV/ESPN+): Jeff Siembieda (play–by–play) and George Carter (analyst)

Scoring summary
1	12:50	NM	Kyle Jarvis 11–yard pass from Terry Wilson Jr. (Andrew Shelley kick) (3 plays, 22 yards, 1:28)	NM 7–0
1	08:16	NM	Trace Bruckler 4–yard pass from Terry Wilson Jr. (Andrew Shelley kick) (9 plays, 74 yards, 4:02)	NM 14–0
2	12:59	HBU	Tyson Thompson 44–yard punt return (Gino Garcia kick)	NM 14–7
2	04:27	HBU	Gino Garcia 45–yard field goal (16 plays, 48 yards, 6:09)	NM 14–10
2	02:40	NM	Keyonte Lanier 47–yard pass from Terry Wilson Jr. (Andrew Shelley kick) (4 plays, 59 yards, 1:40)	NM 21–10
3	06:22	NM	Andrew Shelley 30–yard field goal (10 plays, 38 yards, 5:42)	NM 24–10
4	04:03	HBU	Charles King 6–yard pass from Blaise Bentsen (Gino Garcia kick) (7 plays, 40 yards, 2:57)	NM 24–17
4	01:38	NM	Andrew Shelley 37–yard field goal (4 plays, 7 yards, 1:21)	NM 27–17

Statistics	Houston Baptist	New Mexico
First downs	15	16
Total yards	187	308
Rushing yards	–9	129
Passing yards	196	179
Turnovers	3	3
Time of possession	26:47	33:13

Team	Category	Player	Statistics
Houston Baptist	Passing	Blaise Bentsen	27/47, 196 yards, 1 TD, 2 INTs
Houston Baptist	Rushing	Dreshawn Minnieweather	5 carries, 21 yards
Houston Baptist	Receiving	Charles King	7 receptions, 64 yards, 1 TD
New Mexico	Passing	Terry Wilson Jr.	20/26, 174 yards, 3 TDs
New Mexico	Rushing	Aaron Dumas	15 carries, 57 yards
New Mexico	Receiving	Keyonte Lanier	3 receptions, 72 yards, 1 TD

=== Northern Colorado ===
Northern Colorado at Houston Baptist

Team	1	2	3	4	Total
• Bears	14	7	17	7	45
Huskies	0	6	7	0	13

- Date: September 11, 2021
- Location: Husky Stadium
  Houston, TX
- Game start: 6:00 p.m. CDT
- Elapsed time:
- Game attendance:
- Game weather: • Weather: TBD • Wind: TBD
- Referee:
- TV announcers ( ):

Scoring summary
1
2
3
4

Statistics	Northern Colorado	Houston Baptist
First downs		
Total yards		
Rushing yards		
Passing yards		
Turnovers		
Time of possession		

Team	Category	Player	Statistics
Northern Colorado	Passing		
Northern Colorado	Rushing		
Northern Colorado	Receiving		
Houston Baptist	Passing		
Houston Baptist	Rushing		
Houston Baptist	Receiving		

=== At Prairie View A&M ===
Houston Baptist at Prairie View A&M

Team	1	2	3	4	Total
Huskies	21	3	3	0	27
• Panthers	20	3	7	7	37

- Date: September 18, 2021
- Location: Panther Stadium at Blackshear Field
  Prairie View, TX
- Game start: 6:00 p.m. CDT
- Elapsed time:
- Game attendance:
- Game weather: • Weather: TBD • Wind: TBD
- Referee:
- TV announcers ( ):

Scoring summary
1
2
3
4

Statistics	Houston Baptist	Prairie View A&M
First downs		
Total yards		
Rushing yards		
Passing yards		
Turnovers		
Time of possession		

Team	Category	Player	Statistics
Houston Baptist	Passing		
Houston Baptist	Rushing		
Houston Baptist	Receiving		
Prairie View A&M	Passing		
Prairie View A&M	Rushing		
Prairie View A&M	Receiving		

=== At Nicholls ===
Houston Baptist at Nicholls

Team	1	2	3	4	Total
Huskies	0	14	0	3	17
• Colonels	21	14	10	3	48

- Date: October 2, 2021
- Location: Manning Field at John L. Guidry Stadium
  Thibodaux, LA
- Game start: 3:00 p.m. CDT
- Elapsed time: 3:03
- Game attendance: 5,840
- Game weather: 78 °F (26 °C) • Weather: Cloudy and muggy • Wind: 7mph ESE
- Referee: Nolan Dumas
- TV announcers (ESPN3):

Scoring summary
1
2
3
4

Statistics	Houston Baptist	Nicholls
First downs	10	33
Total yards	182	650
Rushing yards	35	421
Passing yards	147	229
Turnovers	2	4
Time of possession	22:45	37:15

Team	Category	Player	Statistics
Houston Baptist	Passing		
Houston Baptist	Rushing		
Houston Baptist	Receiving		
Nicholls	Passing		
Nicholls	Rushing		
Nicholls	Receiving		

=== Northwestern State ===
Northwestern State at Houston Baptist

Team	1	2	Total
Demons			0
Huskies			0

- Date: October 9, 2021
- Location: Husky Stadium
  Houston, TX
- Game start: 6:00 p.m. CDT
- Elapsed time:
- Game attendance:
- Game weather: • Weather: TBD • Wind: TBD
- Referee:
- TV announcers (ESPN+):

Scoring summary
1
2
3
4

Statistics	Northwestern State	Houston Baptist
First downs		
Total yards		
Rushing yards		
Passing yards		
Turnovers		
Time of possession		

Team	Category	Player	Statistics
Northwestern State	Passing		
Northwestern State	Rushing		
Northwestern State	Receiving		
Houston Baptist	Passing		
Houston Baptist	Rushing		
Houston Baptist	Receiving		

=== At No. 11 Southeastern Louisiana ===
Houston Baptist at Southeastern Louisiana

Team	1	2	Total
Huskies			0
No. 11 Lions			0

- Date: October 16, 2021
- Location: Strawberry Field
  Hammond, LA
- Game start: 4:00 p.m. CDT
- Elapsed time:
- Game attendance: 7,389
- Game weather: • Weather: TBD • Wind: TBD
- Referee:
- TV announcers (ESPN+):

Scoring summary
1
2
3
4

Statistics	Houston Baptist	Southeastern Louisiana
First downs		
Total yards		
Rushing yards		
Passing yards		
Turnovers		
Time of possession		

Team	Category	Player	Statistics
Houston Baptist	Passing		
Houston Baptist	Rushing		
Houston Baptist	Receiving		
Southeastern Louisiana	Passing		
Southeastern Louisiana	Rushing		
Southeastern Louisiana	Receiving		

=== Nicholls ===
Nicholls at Houston Baptist

Team	1	2	3	4	Total
• Colonels	27	3	7	7	44
Huskies	7	7	0	0	14

- Date: October 23, 2021
- Location: Husky Stadium
  Houston, TX
- Game start: 6:00 p.m. CDT
- Elapsed time: 03:11
- Game attendance: 2,362
- Game weather: 68 °F (20 °C) • Weather: Rain • Wind: 9mph S
- Referee: Craig Helser
- TV announcers (ESPN+):

Scoring summary
1
2
3
4

Statistics	Nicholls	Houston Baptist
First downs	30	15
Total yards	572	157
Rushing yards	347	8
Passing yards	225	149
Turnovers	2	1
Time of possession	36:52	23:04

Team	Category	Player	Statistics
Nicholls	Passing		
Nicholls	Rushing		
Nicholls	Receiving		
Houston Baptist	Passing		
Houston Baptist	Rushing		
Houston Baptist	Receiving		

=== At No. 22 Incarnate Word ===
Houston Baptist at Incarnate Word

Team	1	2	3	4	Total
Huskies	0	7	7	7	21
• No. 22 Cardinals	14	14	14	7	49

- Date: October 30, 2021
- Location: Gayle and Tom Benson Stadium
  San Antonio, TX
- Game start: 3:00 p.m. CDT
- Elapsed time:
- Game attendance: 2,711
- Game weather: 79 °F (26 °C) • Weather: Sunny • Wind: SW 7 mph
- Referee: Gary Leeper
- TV announcers (ESPN+): David Saltzman (play-by-play, Shea Walker (analyst), Laura Sadler (sideline)

Scoring summary
1
2
3
4

Statistics	Houston Baptist	Incarnate Word
First downs		
Total yards		
Rushing yards		
Passing yards		
Turnovers		
Time of possession		

Team	Category	Player	Statistics
Houston Baptist	Passing		
Houston Baptist	Rushing		
Houston Baptist	Receiving		
Incarnate Word	Passing		
Incarnate Word	Rushing		
Incarnate Word	Receiving		

=== At Northwestern State ===
Houston Baptist at Northwestern State

Team	1	2	Total
Huskies			0
Demons			0

- Date: November 6, 2021
- Location: Harry Turpin Stadium
  Natchitoches, LA
- Game start: 3:00 p.m. CDT
- Elapsed time:
- Game attendance:
- Game weather: • Weather: TBD • Wind: TBD
- Referee:
- TV announcers (ESPN+):

Scoring summary
1
2
3
4

Statistics	Houston Baptist	Northwestern State
First downs		
Total yards		
Rushing yards		
Passing yards		
Turnovers		
Time of possession		

Team	Category	Player	Statistics
Houston Baptist	Passing		
Houston Baptist	Rushing		
Houston Baptist	Receiving		
Northwestern State	Passing		
Northwestern State	Rushing		
Northwestern State	Receiving		

=== McNeese State ===
McNeese State at Houston Baptist

Team	1	2	3	4	Total
• Cowboys	14	14	3	13	44
Huskies	3	0	0	0	3

- Date: November 13, 2021
- Location: Husky Stadium
  Houston, TX
- Game start: 2:00 p.m. CST
- Elapsed time: 3:11
- Game attendance: 2,325
- Game weather: 67 °F (19 °C) • Weather: Sunny • Wind: S 8mph
- Referee: Ed Bourgeois
- TV announcers (ESPN+):

Scoring summary
1
2
3
4

Statistics	McNeese State	Houston Baptist
First downs		
Total yards		
Rushing yards		
Passing yards		
Turnovers		
Time of possession		

Team	Category	Player	Statistics
McNeese State	Passing		
McNeese State	Rushing		
McNeese State	Receiving		
Houston Baptist	Passing		
Houston Baptist	Rushing		
Houston Baptist	Receiving		

=== No. 18 Incarnate Word ===
Incarnate Word at Houston Baptist

Team	1	2	3	4	Total
• No. 18 Cardinals	35	7	10	3	55
Huskies	0	14	0	0	14

- Date: November 20, 2021
- Location: Husky Stadium
  Houston, TX
- Game start: 2:00 p.m. CST
- Elapsed time:
- Game attendance: 1,931
- Game weather: 78 °F (26 °C) • Weather: Sunny • Wind: NW 9 mph
- Referee: Craig Helser
- TV announcers (ESPN+): Randy McIlvoy (play-by-play), Shea Walker (analyst), Laura Sadler (sideline)

Scoring summary
1
2
3
4

Statistics	Incarnate Word	Houston Baptist
First downs		
Total yards		
Rushing yards		
Passing yards		
Turnovers		
Time of possession		

Team	Category	Player	Statistics
Incarnate Word	Passing		
Incarnate Word	Rushing		
Incarnate Word	Receiving		
Houston Baptist	Passing		
Houston Baptist	Rushing		
Houston Baptist	Receiving		
