= Frank Wilson (American football, born 1973) =

American football player and coach (born 1973)

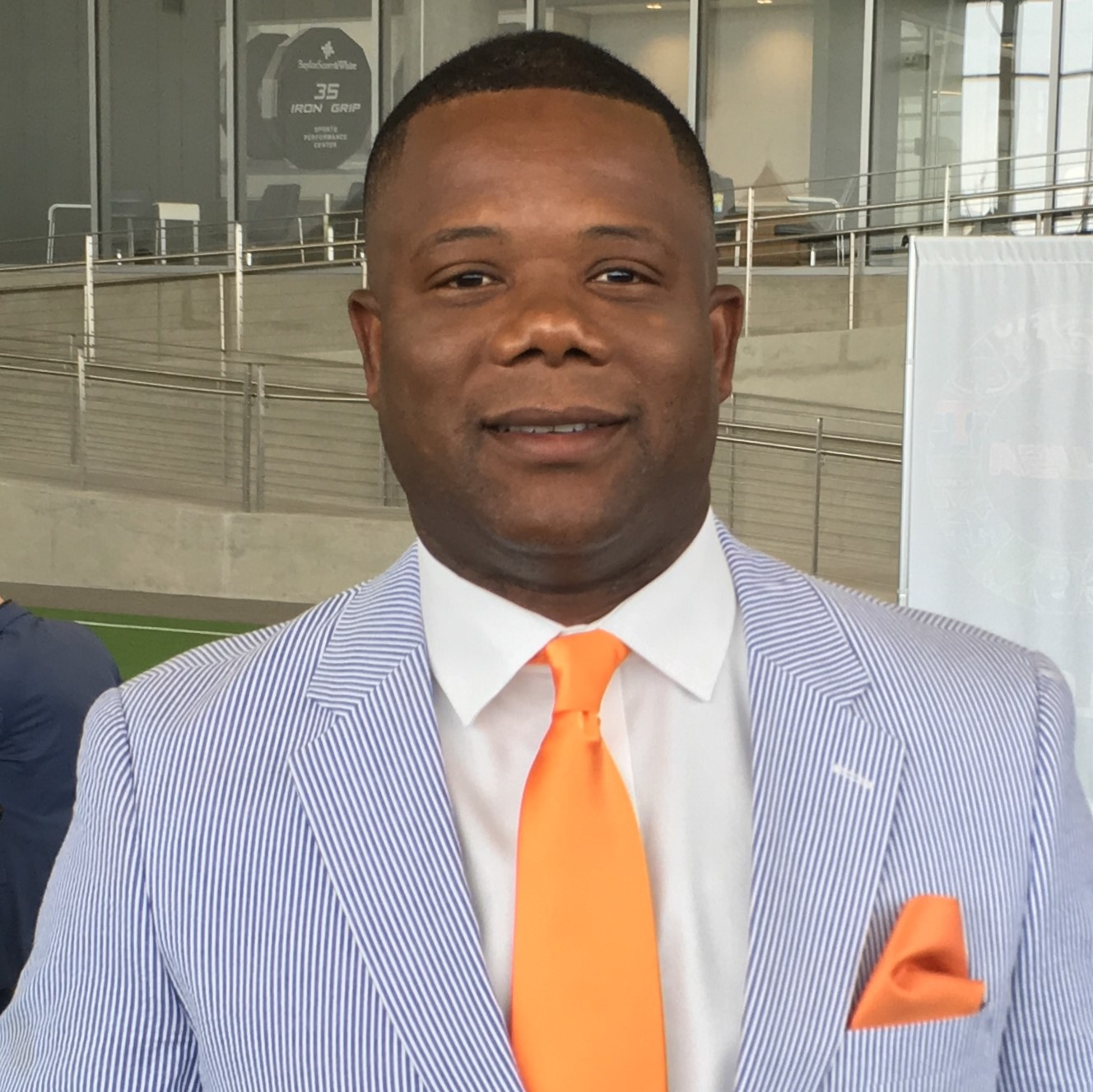
- Wilson at 2018 C-USA Kickoff

Current position
- Title: Running backs coach
- Team: Ole Miss
- Conference: SEC

Biographical details
- Born: November 5, 1973 (age 53); New Orleans, Louisiana, U.S.

Playing career
- 1993: Geneva
- 1994–1996: Nicholls State

Coaching career (HC unless noted)
- 1996: Nicholls State (SA)
- 1997–1999: Edna Karr HS (LA) (assistant)
- 2000–2003: O. P. Walker HS (LA)
- 2005–2007: Ole Miss (RB/ST)
- 2008: Southern Miss (RB/RC)
- 2009: Tennessee (WR)
- 2010–2015: LSU (AHC/RB/RC)
- 2016–2019: UTSA
- 2020–2021: McNeese State
- 2022–2025: LSU (AHC/RB)
- 2025: LSU (interim HC)
- 2026–present: Ole Miss (Senior Associate HC/RB)

Head coaching record
- Overall: 28–43 (college)
- Bowls: 0–2

Frank Wilson III (born November 5, 1973) is an American college football coach who is the running backs coach at University of Mississippi (Ole Miss). Wilson served as the head football coach at the University of Texas at San Antonio (UTSA) from 2016 to 2019 and McNeese State University in Lake Charles, Louisiana from 2020 to 2021.

== Playing career ==
Wilson played college football at Nicholls State University, where he was named honorable mention all-conference as a running back during his sophomore year. He was also named preseason all-conference as a defensive back his junior year and as a running back his senior year.

Prior to Nicholls State, he played his freshman year at Geneva College, in Beaver Falls, Pennsylvania, where he was named NAIA Division II honorable mention All-American. Wilson graduated from St. Augustine High School in New Orleans, Louisiana.

== Coaching career ==
=== High school ===
Wilson was head football coach at O. Perry Walker High School in New Orleans, Louisiana from 2000 to 2003. While at O. Perry Walker, Wilson led the Chargers to the 2002 Class 4A state finals. He was honored by the NFL as the 2002 Coach of the Year for the state of Louisiana and was voted as the Louisiana Class 4A Coach of the Year by his fellow coaches. Wilson also was a 2002 Nike National Coach of the Year finalist. During his three years at O. Perry Walker, Wilson had 22 players sign Division I scholarships, including 11 in 2002 to rank as the nation's largest class of Division I signees by any one high school. He also spent three years as an assistant coach at Edna Karr High Schoolm from 1997 to 2000.

Wilson served as director of athletics for the New Orleans Public School System in 2004.

=== Ole Miss ===
From 2005 to 2007, Wilson was running backs coach at Ole Miss under head coach Ed Orgeron and was a primary character in the book "Meat Market" by Bruce Feldman, which followed Ole Miss through the 2006–07 recruiting season.

=== Southern Miss ===
In 2008, Wilson was running backs coach and recruiting coordinator at the University of Southern Mississippi under head coach Larry Fedora.

=== Tennessee ===
In 2009, Wilson was wide receivers coach at the University of Tennessee under head coach Lane Kiffin.

=== LSU (first stint) ===
Prior to taking the UTSA job, Wilson had been running backs coach and recruiting coordinator at Louisiana State University under head coach Les Miles since 2010. Wilson had also served as the associate head coach for the Tigers.

In 2011, Rivals.com named Wilson the National Recruiter of the Year. In 2014, NFL.com named Wilson the top recruiter in all of college football. In 2015, Scout.com honored Wilson as the SEC Recruiter of the Year. In 2015, LSU secured a Top 5 recruiting class, according to 247Sports. The achievement marked the first time since 2002–03 that LSU finished with back-to-back Top 5 recruiting classes in America. From 2011 to 2014, 29 LSU Tigers have been selected in the NFL Draft which ranks second to Alabama (30).

=== UTSA ===
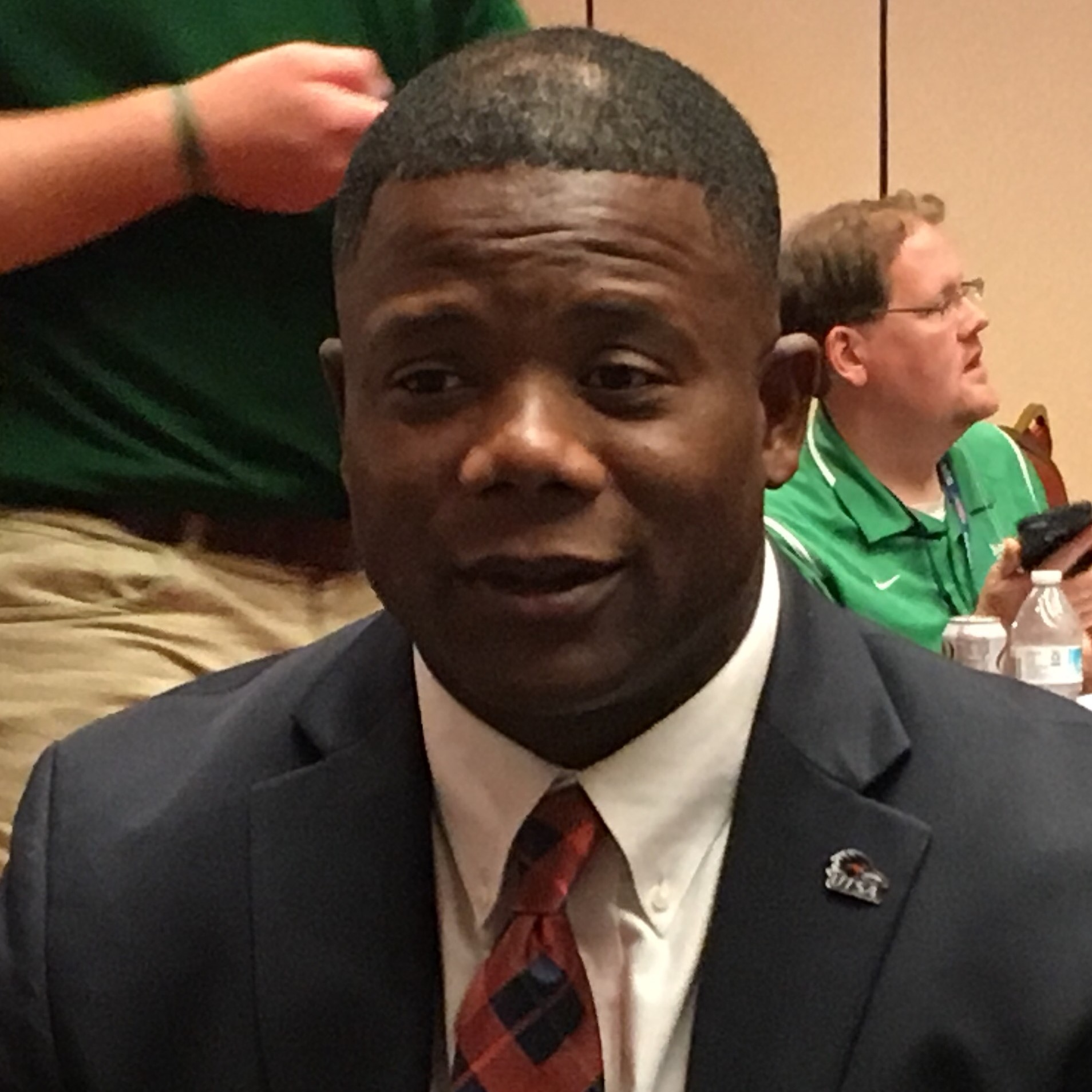
Wilson at 2017 C-USA Media Days

On January 14, 2016, Wilson was hired as the new head coach of the UTSA Roadrunners. Wilson replaced Larry Coker, who resigned on January 5. Through two seasons, Wilson lost just as many games as he has won.

Coach Wilson lead UTSA to their first ever bowl game in his first season as coach. Following the season Wilson and his staff secured the #1 ranked recruiting class in C-USA according to the Rivals.com rankings. Wilson's first full class finished 69th in the nation. UTSA had never before finished higher than 103rd prior to this class.

He was fired on December 1, 2019. He finished his first stint as a college head coach with a 19–29 record with just four of those wins coming against teams that finished the season with a winning record.

=== McNeese State ===
On January 16, 2020, Wilson was hired as the head coach of the McNeese State Cowboys. Wilson replaced Sterlin Gilbert who left McNeese State to become the offensive coordinator and quarterbacks coach at Syracuse. He resigned on December 7, 2021, after posting a 7–11 record in two seasons.

=== LSU (second stint) ===
On December 7, 2021, Wilson was hired as the associate head coach of the Louisiana State University Tigers.

In April 2021, former LSU Assistant Athletic Director of Football Recruiting and Alumni Relations, Sharon Lewis, filed a federal lawsuit against the university for years of harassment for her attempts to report sexual misconduct allegations against players, coaches, and athletic officials. Wilson was named as one of the coaches accused of sexual misconduct during his first tenure with LSU as part of Lewis' lawsuit.

Wilson became interim head coach at LSU in 2025 when Brian Kelly was fired. Prior to the 2025 Texas Bowl, Wilson was hired as running backs coach at Ole Miss.

== Head coaching record ==
Year	Team	Overall	Conference	Standing	Bowl/playoffs
UTSA Roadrunners (Conference USA) (2016–2019)
2016	UTSA	6–7	5–3	2nd (West)	L New Mexico
2017	UTSA	6–5	3–5	5th (West)	
2018	UTSA	3–9	2–6	5th (West)	
2019	UTSA	4–8	3–5	T–4th (West)	
UTSA:		19–29	13–19		
McNeese State Cowboys (Southland Conference) (2020–2021)
2020–21	McNeese State	3–4	2–4	T–5th	
2021	McNeese State	4–7	3–5	T–4th	
McNeese State:		7–11	5–9		
LSU Tigers (Southeastern Conference) (2025)
2025	LSU	2–3	1–2	10th (Note: Wilson replaced Brian Kelly with four games remaining)	L Texas
LSU:		2–3	1–2		
Total:		28–43			
