= Husky Stadium (Houston Christian University) =

Football stadium in Houston, Texas, US

Dunham Field at Husky Stadium
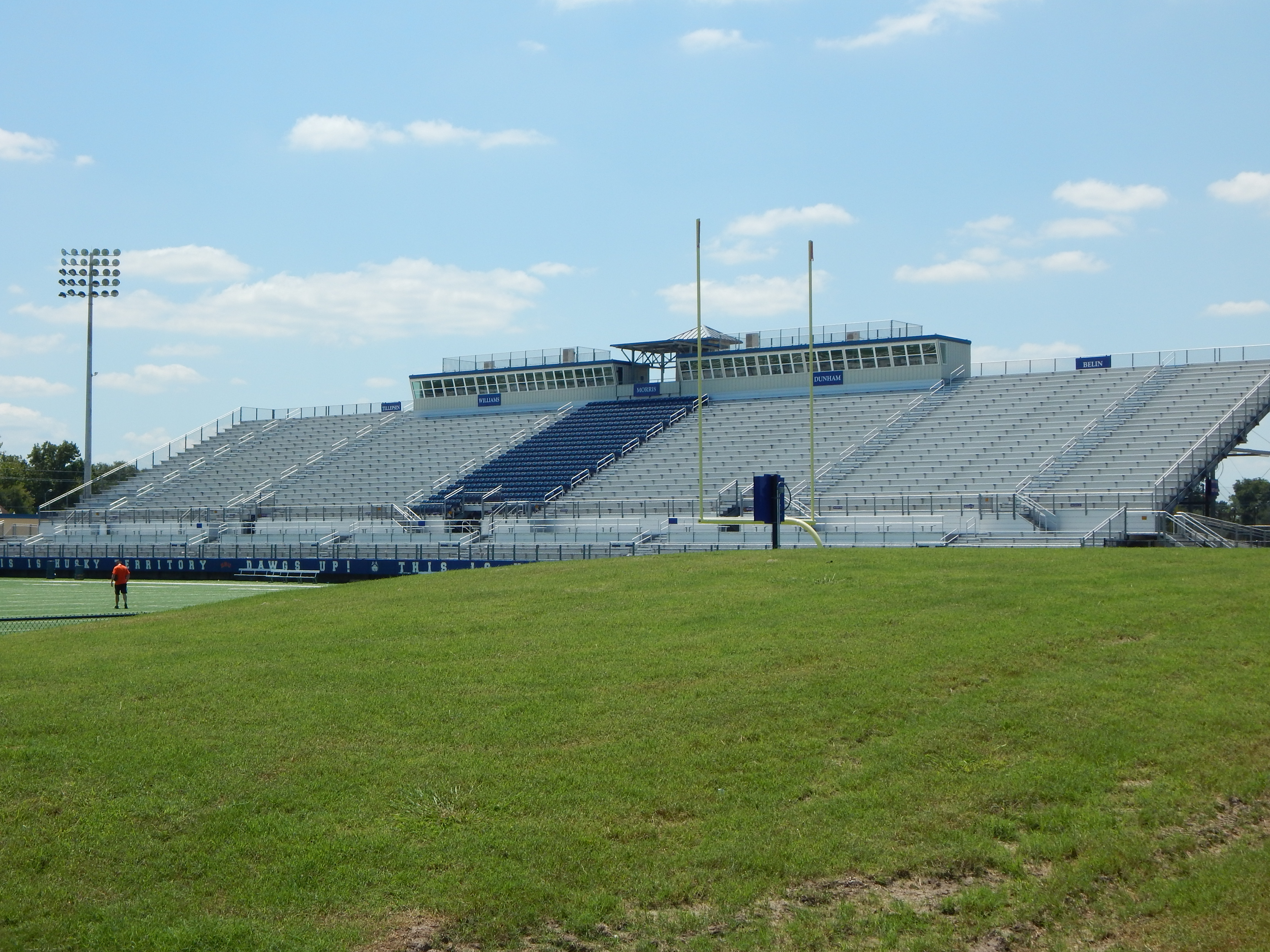
- Interactive map of Dunham Field at Husky Stadium
- Location: 7502 Fondren Road; Houston, Texas 77074
- Coordinates: 29°41′33″N 95°30′41″W
- Owner: Houston Christian University
- Operator: Houston Christian University
- Capacity: 5,000
- Surface: Desso iDNA
- Record attendance: 4,125 (September 10, 2016)

Construction
- Groundbreaking: March 2013
- Opened: September 6, 2014
- Cost: Estimated cost $13 million
- Architect: PGAL
- General contractor: Tellepsen Builders

Tenant
- Houston Christian Huskies (NCAA) (2014–present)

Husky Stadium is a stadium on the campus of Houston Christian University in Houston, Texas. It is used for American football, and is the home field for the Houston Christian Huskies football team. The stadium is located near the corner of Beechnut and Fondren. Initial capacity is 5,000, with future construction phases to increase capacity. The stadium's inaugural game held on September 6, 2014, was between the then-Houston Baptist Huskies (Note: The university adopted its current name on September 21, 2022.) and the McMurry War Hawks.

== Stadium features ==
First phase for the stadium includes grandstands on the western side of the stadium with seating for 5,065 including 468 chairback seats. A berm is located north of the northern end zone area. The stadium includes two press box sections, each measuring 12' x 71'. A covered camera deck is located between the two press box sections. An elevator tower at the rear of the grandstands provides access to the press box level. On the ground level, a combination ticket box office/concession building is located at the northern side of the grandstands. Concessions are also located at the southern side of the grandstands with restrooms located in between. Also included is a weight room for the Husky athletic programs. Dunham Field, the playing field, is an artificial surface consisting of a Desso iDNA surface. The playing field was installed prior to the 2013 season. It was used only as the Huskies' practice field in the initial season until the stadium was built prior to the 2014 season.

== Donations and gifts ==
Donors who helped build the stadium include Bob & Janice McNair and Archie & Linda Dunham. The Dunham's donation was used to construct the field and practice facilities, so the field has been named Dunham Field. The McNairs donation was used to finish the stadium's seating, ticket office, and press box.

== Year by year ==
In the past 5 seasons the Huskies have had a winning record at home 3 times. Their best record is 4-2, doing so in 2019 and 2024. A 7-4 record at home from 2023-2024 is the best home record over 2 seasons.

Houston Christian Huskies
Season	Average Crowd	Largest Crowd	Home Record
2014	3,502	4,018	1–4
2015	2,396	3,185	2–5
2016	3,276	4,125	3–2
2017	2,250	2,543	0–4
2018	2,217	2,687	1–5
2019	2,322	3,215	4–2
2020	-	-	N/A
2021	2,148	2,362	0–5
2022	1,681	2,125	0–5
2023	1,797	2,112	3–2
2024	1,876	2,232	4–2
2025	1,404	1,859	2–3
2026	1,438	1,696	3-1
Total			23–40 (.365)

== Attendance records ==
Rank	Attendance	Date	Game Result
1	4,125	September 10, 2016	Houston Baptist 24, Texas Southern 20
2	4,007	October 4, 2025	Texas Southern 51, Arkansas-Pine Bluff 7
3	4,018	September 6, 2014	Houston Baptist 17, McMurry 27
4	3,823	September 27, 2014	Houston Baptist 14, Abilene Christian 59
5	3,386	October 25, 2014	Houston Baptist 31, Nicholls State 21
6	3,217	October 15, 2016	Houston Baptist 30, Nicholls State 33^{2OT}
7	3,215	September 28, 2019	Houston Baptist 68, Texas Southern 31
8	3,185	September 12, 2015	Houston Baptist 10, Northern Colorado 34
9	3,158	October 18, 2014	Houston Baptist 27, Stephen F. Austin 59
10	3,134	September 24, 2016	Houston Baptist 16, 2 Sam Houston State 52

== Gallery ==
Views around the stadium
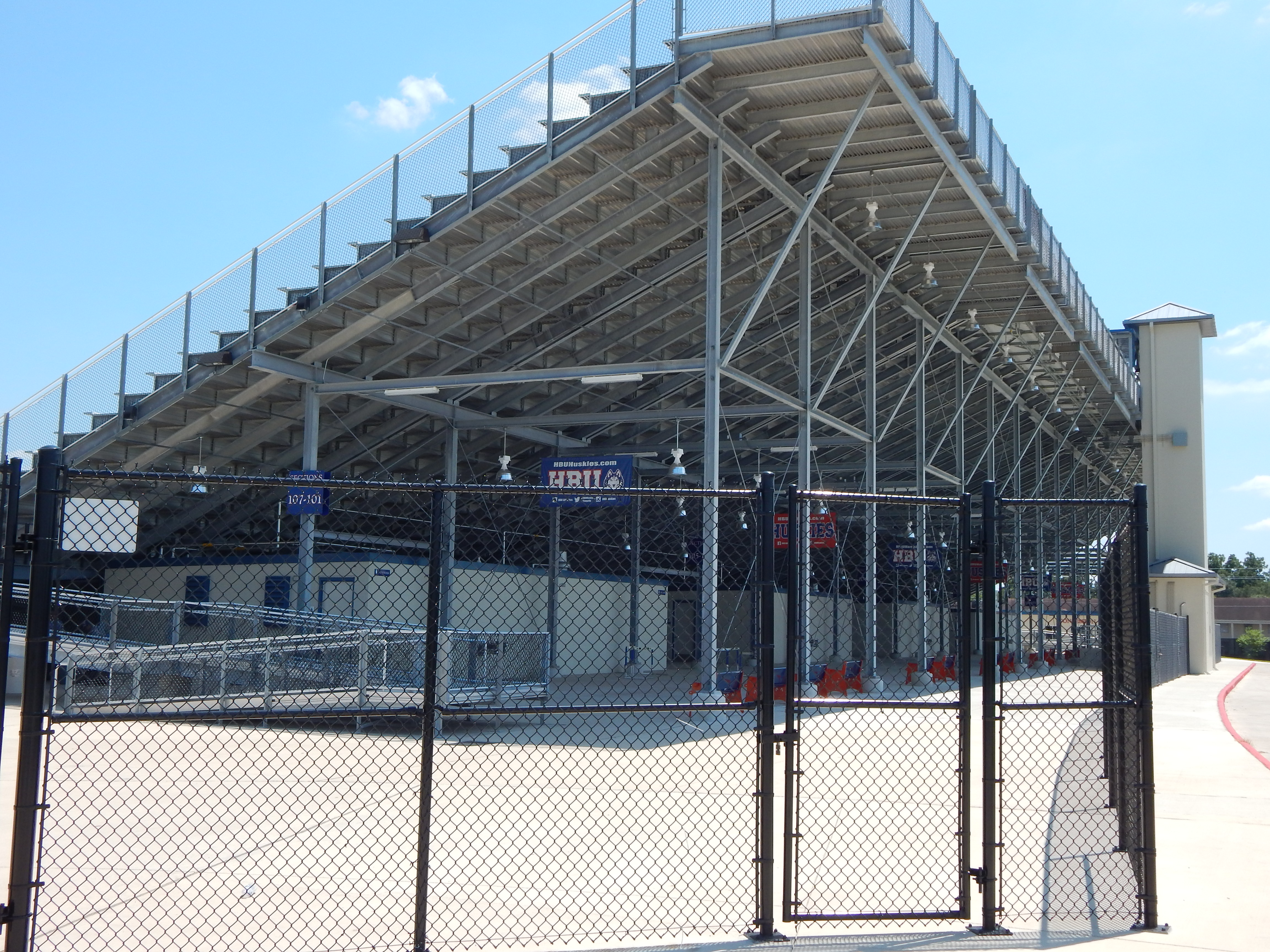
Under the Grandstands - From the North side

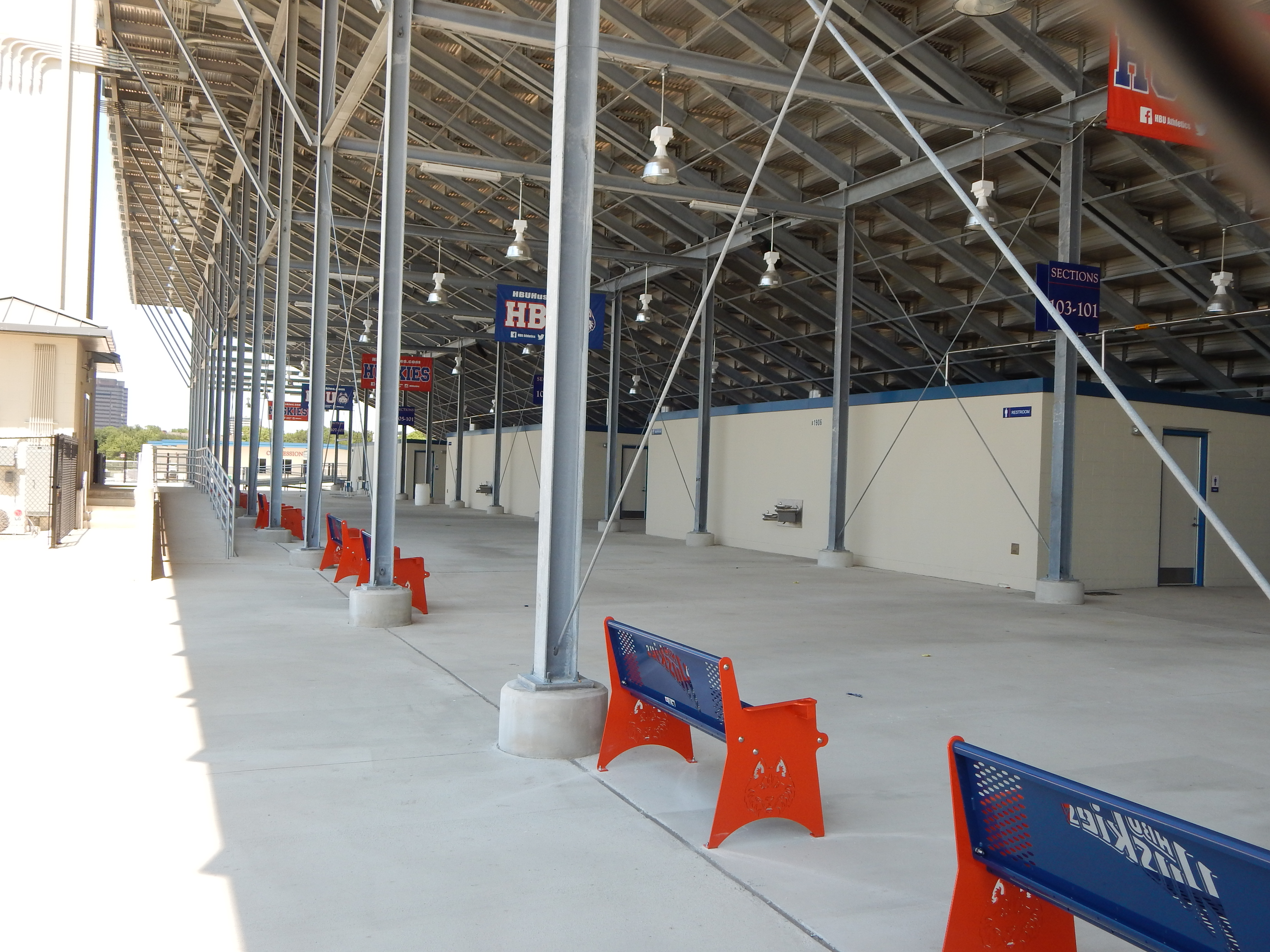
Under the Grandstands - From the South side

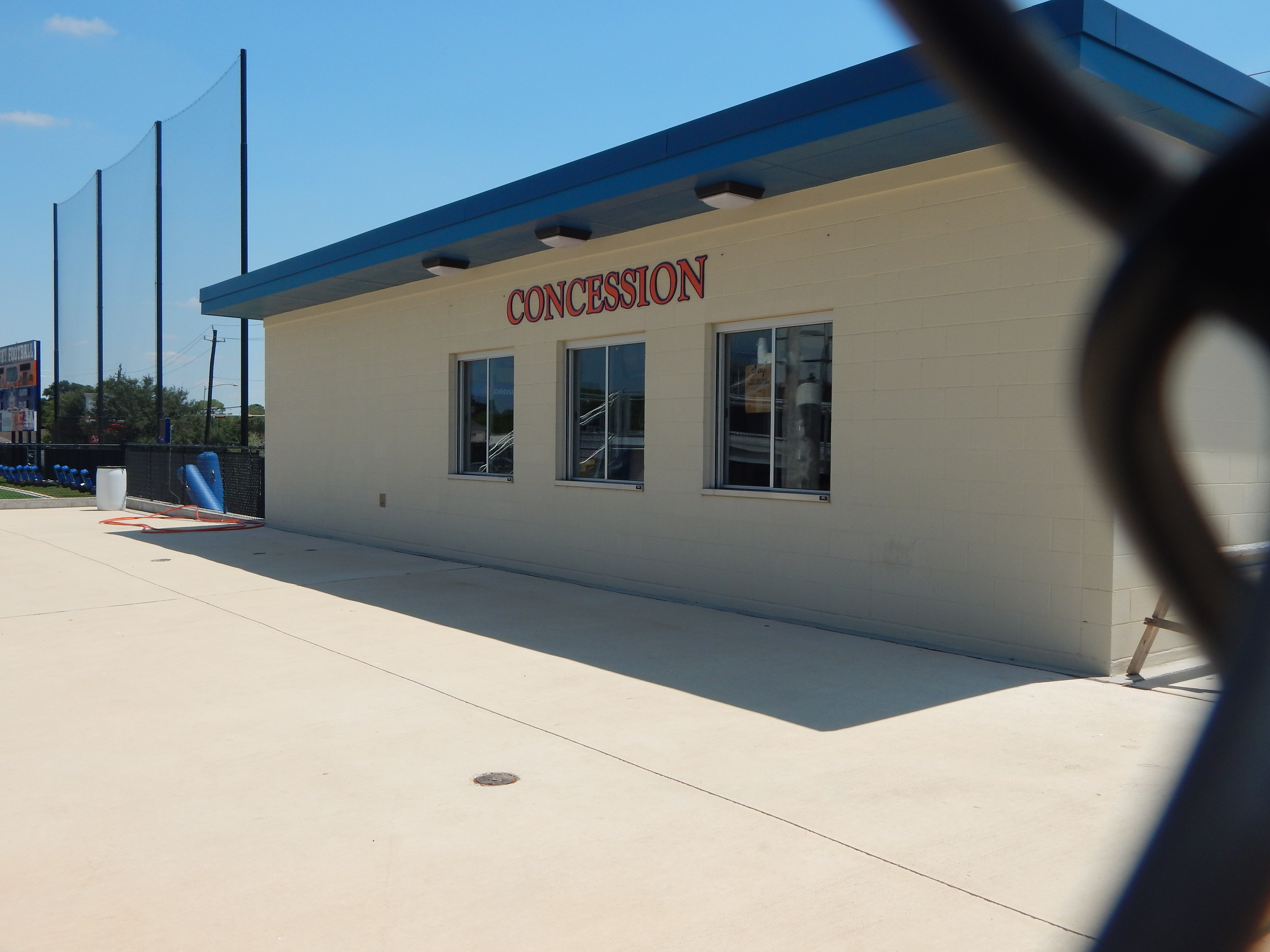
Concessions - South side

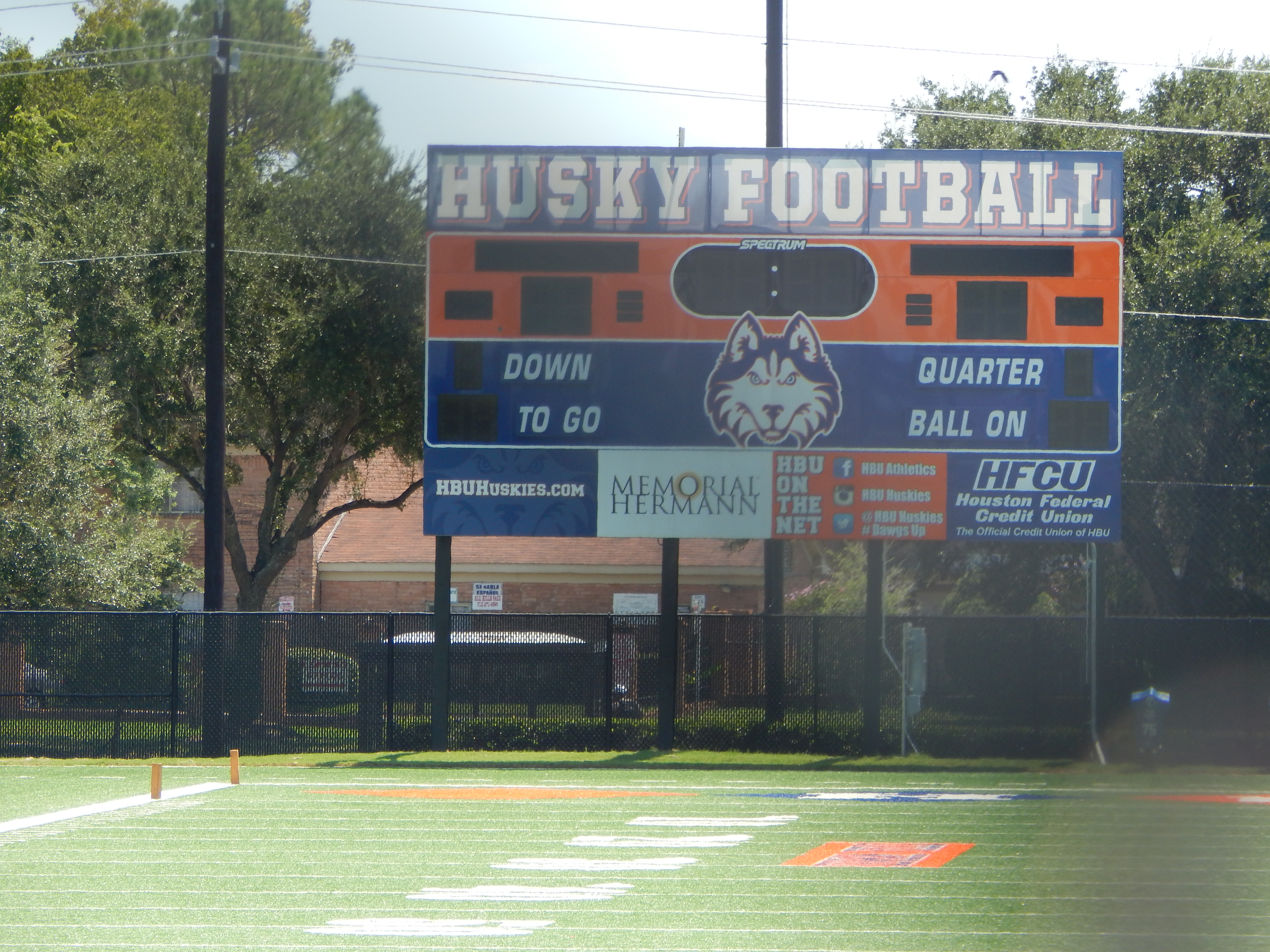
Scoreboard

== See also ==
- List of NCAA Division I FCS football stadiums
