= 2018 Central Arkansas Bears football team =

American college football season

2018 Central Arkansas Bears football
- Conference: Southland Conference
- Record: 6–5 (5–4 Southland)
- Head coach: Nathan Brown (1st season)
- Offensive coordinator: Ken Collums (1st season)
- Offensive scheme: Spread
- Defensive coordinator: Max Thurmond (1st season)
- Base defense: 4–2–5
- Home stadium: Estes Stadium

2018 Southland Conference football standings
	Conf.			Overall
Team	W		L	W		L
No. 14 Nicholls +^	7	–	2	9	–	4
Incarnate Word +^	6	–	2	6	–	5
Lamar ^	6	–	3	7	–	5
Abilene Christian	5	–	4	6	–	5
Central Arkansas	5	–	4	6	–	5
McNeese State	5	–	4	6	–	5
Sam Houston State	5	–	4	6	–	5
Northwestern State	4	–	5	5	–	6
Southeastern Louisiana	4	–	5	4	–	7
Stephen F. Austin	2	–	7	2	–	8
Houston Baptist	0	–	9	1	–	10
+ – Conference co-champions; ^ – FCS playoff participant; Rankings from STATS poll

The 2018 Central Arkansas Bears football team represented the University of Central Arkansas in the 2018 NCAA Division I FCS football season. The Bears were led by first-year head coach Nathan Brown and played their home games at Estes Stadium. They were a member of the Southland Conference. They finished the season 6–5, 5–4 in Southland play to finish in a four-way tie for fourth place.

== Preseason ==
=== Preseason All-Conference Teams ===
On July 12, 2018, the Southland announced their Preseason All-Conference Teams, with the Bears having 11 players selected.

Offense First Team

- Carlos Blackman – Jr. RB

Defense First Team

- Chris Terrell – Jr. DL
- Eric Jackson – Sr. DL
- Juan Jackson – Jr. DB

Offense Second Team

- Josh Nix – So. TE
- Adrian Harris – So. OL
- Hunter Watts – Jr. OL

Defense Second Team

- Cardell Best – Sr. DL
- Nathan Grant – So. DL
- Raphael Garner – Sr. LB
- Cedric Battle – Sr. KR

=== Preseason poll ===
On July 19, 2018, the Southland announced their preseason poll, with the Bears predicted to finish in third place.

=== Award watch lists ===
Award	Player	Position	Year
Buck Buchanan Award	Chris Terrell	DE	JR

== Schedule ==
Date	Time	Opponent	Rank	Site	TV	Result	Attendance
September 1	6:00 p.m.	at Tulsa*	No. 16	H. A. Chapman Stadium; Tulsa, OK	ESPN3	L 27–38	18,356
September 8	6:00 pm	Murray State*	No. 17	Estes Stadium; Conway, AR	SLC Digital	W 26–13	6,121
September 15	7:00 p.m.	at Southeastern Louisiana	No. 18	Strawberry Stadium; Hammond, LA	ESPN+	W 33–25	6,485
September 29	3:00 pm	at No. 21 Sam Houston State	No. 13	Bowers Stadium; Huntsville, TX	ESPN3	L 31–34 ^{OT}	7,598
October 6	6:00 pm	Houston Baptist	No. 20	Estes Stadium; Conway, AR	Bear Nation Network	W 66–35	10,210
October 13	3:00 p.m.	at Stephen F. Austin	No. 18	Homer Bryce Stadium; Nacogdoches, TX	ESPN3	W 27–17	5,976
October 20	6:00 pm	Northwestern State	No. 15	Estes Stadium; Conway, AR	Bear Nation Network	W 38–17	6,754
October 27	6:00 p.m.	at No. 14 McNeese State	No. 13	Cowboy Stadium; Lake Charles, LA (Red Beans and Rice Bowl)	ESPN3	L 21–23	11,208
November 3	6:00 pm	Lamar^{†}	No. 19	Estes Stadium; Conway, AR	ELVN, CST, SLC Digital	L 24–38	10,874
November 10	3:00 pm	Incarnate Word		Estes Stadium; Conway, AR	SLC Digital	L 27–40	4,457
November 17	2:00 p.m.	at Abilene Christian		Wildcat Stadium; Abilene, TX	ESPN+	W 16–7	8,006
*Non-conference game; ^{†}Homecoming; Rankings from STATS Poll released prior to the game; All times are in Central time

== Game summaries ==
=== At Tulsa ===
Central Arkansas at Tulsa

Team	1	2	3	4	Total
No. 16 Bears	13	0	7	7	27
• Golden Hurricane	7	14	3	14	38

- Date: September 1
- Location: Skelly Field at H. A. Chapman Stadium
  Tulsa, Oklahoma
- Game start: 6:00 p.m. CDT
- Game attendance: 18,356
- Referee: Bob Johnson
- Television network: ESPN3

Scoring summary
1	12:49	TULSA	Hobbs 49-yard pass from Skipper (Walker kick)	TULSA 0–7
1	10:43	UCA	Cummins 19-yard FG	TULSA 3–7
1	6:23	UCA	Cummins 40-yard FG	TULSA 6–7
1	3:54	UCA	Kierr 1-yard rush (Cummins kick)	UCA 13–7
2	14:57	TULSA	Skipper 1-yard rush (Walker kick)	TULSA 13–14
2	5:10	TULSA	Brooks 1-yard rush (Walker kick)	TULSA 13–21
3	5:52	UCA	Smith 2-yard rush (Walker kick)	TULSA 20–21
3	1:25	TULSA	Walker 40-yard FG	TULSA 20–24
4	11:08	UCA	Morris fumble recovery in end zone (Cummins kick)	UCA 27–24
4	8:11	TULSA	Neph 14-yard pass from Skipper (Walker kick)	TULSA 27–31
4	7:36	TULSA	Brooks 1-yard rush (Walker kick)	TULSA 27–38

=== Murray State ===
Murray State at Central Arkansas

Team	1	2	3	4	Total
Racers	3	10	0	0	13
• No. 17 Bears	7	13	0	6	26

- Date: September 8
- Location: Estes Stadium
  Conway, AR
- Game start: 6:00 pm CDT
- Television network: SLC Digital

=== At Southeastern Louisiana ===
Central Arkansas at Southeastern Louisiana

Team	1	2	3	4	Total
• No. 18 Bears	0	13	14	6	33
Lions	7	3	7	8	25

- Date: September 15
- Location: Strawberry Stadium
  Hammond, LA
- Game start: 7:00 p.m. CDT
- Television network: ESPN+

=== At Sam Houston State ===
Central Arkansas at Sam Houston State

Team	1	2	3	4	OT	Total
No. 13 Bears	3	7	7	14	0	31
• No. 21 Bearkats	0	14	14	3	3	34

- Date: September 29
- Location: Bowers Stadium
  Huntsville, TX
- Game start: 3:00 p.m. CDT
- Television network: ESPN3

=== Houston Baptist ===
Houston Baptist at Central Arkansas

Team	1	2	3	4	Total
Huskies	14	7	14	0	35
• No. 20 Bears	21	14	17	14	66

- Date: October 6
- Location: Estes Stadium
  Conway, AR
- Game start: 6:00 pm CDT
- Television network: Bear Nation Network

=== At Stephen F. Austin ===
Central Arkansas at Stephen F. Austin

Team	1	2	3	4	Total
• No. 18 Bears	7	3	14	3	27
Lumberjacks	7	0	3	7	17

- Date: October 13
- Location: Homer Bryce Stadium
  Nacogdoches, TX
- Game start: 3:00 p.m. CDT
- Television network: ESPN3

=== Northwestern State ===
Northwestern State at Central Arkansas

Team	1	2	3	4	Total
Demons	0	10	7	0	17
• No. 15 Bears	14	14	7	3	38

- Date: October 20
- Location: Estes Stadium
  Conway, AR
- Game start: 6:00 pm CDT
- Elapsed time: 3:05
- Game attendance: 6,754
- Referee: Cooper Castleberry
- Television network: Bear Nation Network

=== At McNeese State ===
Red Beans and Rice Bowl

Team	1	2	3	4	Total
No. 13 Bears	7	7	7	0	21
• No. 14 Cowboys	17	3	0	3	23

- Date: October 27
- Location: Cowboy Stadium
  Lake Charles, LA
- Game start: 6:00 p.m. CDT
- Elapsed time: 3:15
- Game attendance: 11,208
- Game weather: 73 °F (23 °C) • SW 10 • Clear
- Referee: Michael VanderVelde
- Television network: ESPN3

=== Lamar ===
Lamar at Central Arkansas
(homecoming)

Team	1	2	3	4	Total
• Cardinals	21	14	3	0	38
No. 19 Bears	10	6	0	8	24

- Date: November 3
- Location: Estes Stadium
  Conway, AR
- Game start: 6:00 pm CDT
- Television network: ELVN/CST/SLC Digital

=== Incarnate Word ===
Incarnate Word at Central Arkansas

Team	1	2	3	4	Total
• Cardinals	3	14	13	10	40
Bears	7	7	7	6	27

- Date: November 10
- Location: Estes Stadium
  Conway, AR
- Game start: 3:00 pm CST
- Television network: SLC Digital

=== At Abilene Christian ===
Central Arkansas at Abilene Christian

Team	1	2	3	4	Total
• Bears	0	6	3	7	16
Wildcats	0	7	0	0	7

- Date: November 17
- Location: Wildcat Stadium
  Abilene, TX

== Ranking movements ==
Ranking movements Legend: ██ Increase in ranking ██ Decrease in ranking — = Not ranked RV = Received votes т = Tied with team above or below
	Week													
Poll	Pre	1	2	3	4	5	6	7	8	9	10	11	12	Final
STATS FCS	16	17	18	14	13–T	20	18	15	13	19	RV	RV	RV	
Coaches	15	17	17	13	12	18	16	15	14	19	RV	—	—	
