= 2018 McNeese State Cowboys football team =

American college football season

2018 McNeese State Cowboys football
- Conference: Southland Conference
- Record: 6–5 (5–4 Southland)
- Head coach: Lance Guidry (3rd season)
- Offensive coordinator: Landon Hoefer (3rd season)
- Home stadium: Cowboy Stadium

2018 Southland Conference football standings
	Conf.			Overall
Team	W		L	W		L
No. 14 Nicholls +^	7	–	2	9	–	4
Incarnate Word +^	6	–	2	6	–	5
Lamar ^	6	–	3	7	–	5
Abilene Christian	5	–	4	6	–	5
Central Arkansas	5	–	4	6	–	5
McNeese State	5	–	4	6	–	5
Sam Houston State	5	–	4	6	–	5
Northwestern State	4	–	5	5	–	6
Southeastern Louisiana	4	–	5	4	–	7
Stephen F. Austin	2	–	7	2	–	8
Houston Baptist	0	–	9	1	–	10
+ – Conference co-champions; ^ – FCS playoff participant; Rankings from STATS poll

The 2018 McNeese State Cowboys football team represented McNeese State University as a member of the Southland Conference during the 2018 NCAA Division I FCS football season. Led by Lance Guidry in his third and final season as head caoach, the Cowboys compiled an overall record of 6–5 with a mark of 5–4 in conference play, placing in four-way tie for fourth in the Southland. McNeese State played home games at Cowboy Stadium in Lake Charles, Louisiana.

On November 20, Guidry was fired. He finished his tenure at McNeese State with a three-year record of 21–12.

== Preseason ==
=== Preseason All-Conference Teams ===
On July 12, 2018, the Southland announced their Preseason All-Conference Teams, with the Cowboys having ten players selected.

Offense First Team

- David Hamm – Sr. RB
- Lawayne Ross – Jr. TE
- Gunnar Raborn – Sr. K
- Alex Kjellsten – Sr. P

Defense First Team

- BJ Blunt – Sr. LB

Offense Second Team

- James Tabary – Sr. QB
- Grant Burguillos – Jr. OL

Defense Second Team

- Chris Livings – Jr. DL
- Darion Dunn – So. DB
- Colby Burton – Jr. DB

=== Preseason poll ===
On July 19, 2018, the Southland announced their preseason poll, with the Cowboys predicted to finish in fourth place.

== Schedule ==
Date	Time	Opponent	Rank	Site	TV	Result	Attendance
September 1	3:05 p.m.	at Northern Colorado*	No. 17	Nottingham Field; Greeley, CO	Pluto TV	W 17–14	5,726
September 8	6:00 p.m.	at Houston Baptist	No. 16	Husky Stadium; Houston, TX	ELVN	W 51–34	2,538
September 15	6:00 p.m.	No. 13 Nicholls	No. 16	Cowboy Stadium; Lake Charles, LA	CST	W 20–10	13,140
September 22	5:00 p.m.	at No. 25 (FBS) BYU*	No. 9	LaVell Edwards Stadium; Provo, UT	BYUtv/ESPN3	L 3–30	53,223
September 29	6:00 p.m.	Stephen F. Austin	No. 10	Cowboy Stadium; Lake Charles, LA	Cowboy Insider	W 17–10	8,933
October 6	6:00 p.m.	Abilene Christian	No. 9	Cowboy Stadium; Lake Charles, LA	Cowboy Insider	W 24–21	10,001
October 20	6:00 p.m.	at Incarnate Word	No. 6	Gayle and Tom Benson Stadium; San Antonio, TX	ELVN	L 17–45	3,084
October 27	6:00 p.m.	No. 13 Central Arkansas^{†}	No. 14	Cowboy Stadium; Lake Charles, LA (Red Beans and Rice Bowl)	ESPN3	W 23–21	11,208
November 3	7:00 p.m.	at Southeastern Louisiana	No. 11	Strawberry Stadium; Hammond, LA	CST	L 6–23	5,127
November 10	6:00 p.m.	at Northwestern State	No. 18	Harry Turpin Stadium; Natchitoches, LA (rivalry)	ESPN3	L 34–37	6,111
November 17	3:00 p.m.	Lamar	No. 22	Cowboy Stadium; Lake Charles, LA (Battle of the Border)	ESPN3	L 17–21	11,532
*Non-conference game; ^{†}Homecoming; Rankings from STATS Poll released prior to the game; All times are in Central time

== Game summaries ==
=== At Northern Colorado ===
McNeese State at Houston Baptist – Game summary

Quarter	1	2	3	4	Total
No. 14 Cowboys	21	16	7	7	51
Huskies	7	7	13	7	34

at Husky Stadium, Houston, TX

- Date: September 8
- Game time: 6:00 p.m. CST
- Game weather: 92 °F (33 °C); cloudy
- Game attendance: 2,538
- Referee: Dan Lewis
- TV: Eleven Sports

Game information

First quarter

- MCNS - James Tabary 1-yard TD run, Gunnar Raborn kick good, 12:25 (MCNS 7-0)
- MCNS - Austin Nelson 22-yard TD pass from Tabary, Raborn kick good, 6:11 (MCNS 14-0)
- MCNS - Cyron Sutton 65-yard TD pass from Tabary, Raborn kick good, 5:36 (MCNS 21-0)
- HBU - Dreshawn Minnieweather 1-yard TD run, Alec Chadwick kick good, 3:50 (MCNS 21-7)

Second quarter

- MCNS - Kylon Highshaw 5-yard TD pass from Tabary, Raborn kick no good, 11:37 (MCNS 27-7)
- HBU - Jeremy Smith 10-yard TD pass from Bailey Zappe, Chadwick kick good, 10:30 (MCNS 27-14)
- MCNS - Raborn 34-yard field goal, 6:29 (MCNS 30-14)
- MCNS - Trevor Begue 26-yard TD pass from Tabary, Raborn kick good, 2:38 (MCNS 37-14)

Third quarter

- MCNS - Highshaw 14-yard TD pass from Cody Orgeron, Raborn kick good, 10:59 (MCNS 44-14)
- HBU - Smith 1-yard Td pass from Zappe, Chadwick kick good, 8:47 (MCNS 44-21)
- HBU - Minnieweather 1-yard TD run, Chadwick kick no good, 0:58 (MCNS 44-27)

Fourth quarter

- MCNS - Parker Orgeron 59-yard punt returned for TD, Raborn kick good, 12:04 (MCNS 51-27)
- HBU - David Racine 22-yard TD pass from Zappe, Chadwick kick good, 11:22 (MCNS 51-34)

Top passers

- MCNS - James Tabary - 25/32, 355 yards, 4 TD
- HBU - Bailey Zappe - 18/35, 348 yards, 3 TD, 2 INT

Top rushers

- MCNS - Justin Pratt - 13 carries, 60 yards
- HBU - Dreshawn Minnieweather - 17 carries, 146 yards, 2 TD

Top receivers

- MCNS - Cyron Sutton - 2 receptions, 68 yards, TD
- HBU - David Racine - 3 receptions, 108 yards, TD

=== Nicholls ===
Nicholls at McNeese State – Game summary

Quarter	1	2	3	4	Total
No. 12 Colonels	0	3	0	7	10
No. 15 Cowboys	7	7	3	3	20

at Cowboy Stadium, Lake Charles, LA

- Date: September 15
- Game time: 6:00 p.m. CST
- Game weather: 81 °F (27 °C); overcast
- Game attendance: 13,140
- Referee: Vidal Jones
- TV: Cox Sports Television

Game information

First quarter

- MCNS - Lawayne Ross 16-yard TD pass from James Tabary, Gunnar Raborn kick good, 14:50 (MCNS 7-0)

Second quarter

- MCNS - Cyron Sutton 11-yard TD pass from Tabary, Raborn kick good, 12:37 (MCNS 14-0)
- NICH - Lorran Fonseca 21-yard field goal, 3:08 (MCNS 14-3)

Third quarter

- MCNS - Raborn 24-yard field goal, 8:11 (MCNS 17-3)

Fourth quarter

- MCNS - Raborn 42-yard field goal, 11:53 (MCNS 20-3)
- NICH - Dai'Jean Dixon 2-yard TD pass from Chase Fourcade, Fonseca kick good, 0:06 (MCNS 20-10)

Top passers

- MCNS - James Tabary - 14/19, 133 yards, 2 TD
- NICH - Chase Fourcase - 22/41, 257 yards, TD

Top rushers

- MCNS - Justin Pratt - 11 carries, 45 yards
- NICH - Chase Fourcade - 14 carries, 45 yards

Top receivers

- MCNS - Cyron Sutton - 5 receptions, 56 yards, TD
- NICH - Damion Jeanpiere Jr. - 4 receptions, 100 yards

=== At BYU ===
McNeese State at BYU – Game summary

Quarter	1	2	3	4	Total
No. 9 Colonels	3	0	0	0	3
No. 25 (FBS) Cougars	0	24	6	0	30

at LaVell Edwards Stadium, Provo, UT

- Date: September 22
- Game time: 5:00 p.m. CST
- Game weather: 87 °F (31 °C); sunny, some clouds
- Game attendance: 53,223
- Referee: Brad Van Vark
- TV: ESPN3

Game information

First quarter

- MCNS - Gunnar Raborn 20-yard field goal, 6:38 (MCNS 3-0)

Second quarter

- BYU - Lopini Katoa 4-yard TD run, Skyler Southam kick good, 8:42 (BYU 7-3)
- BYU - Talon Shumway 7-yard TD pass from Tanner Mangum, Southam kick good, 6:37 (BYU 14-3)
- BYU - Katoa 14-yard TD run, Southam kick good, 1:09 (BYU 21-3)
- BYU - Southam 30-yard field goal, 0:00 (BYU 24-3)

Third quarter

- BYU - Southam 22-yard field goal, 8:53 (BYU 27-3)
- BYU - Southam 47-yard field goal, 1:49 (BYU 30-3)

Top passers

- BYU - Tyler Mangum - 15/25, 118 yards, TD
- MCNS - James Tabary - 14/21, 121 yards, INT

Top rushers

- BYU - Lopini Katoa - 10 carries, 64 yards, 2 TD
- MCNS - David Hamm - 8 carries, 29 yards

Top receivers

- BYU - Aleva Hifo - 4 receptions, 38 yards
- MCNS - Cyron Sutton - 3 receptions, 72 yards

=== Stephen F. Austin ===
Stephen F. Austin at McNeese State – Game summary

Quarter	1	2	3	4	Total
Lumberjacks	0	0	0	10	10
No. 10 Cowboys	14	0	3	0	17

at Cowboy Stadium, Lake Charles, LA

- Date: September 29
- Game time: 6:00 p.m. CST
- Game weather: 77 °F (25 °C); heavy rains
- Game attendance: 8,933
- Referee: Stephen Baron

Game information

First quarter

- MCNS - David Hamm 55-yard TD run, Gunnar Raborn kick good, 12:30 (MCNS 7-0)
- MCNS - Parker Orgeron 6-yard TD pass from James Tabary, Raborn kick good, 5:05 (MCNS 14-0)

Third quarter

- MCNS - Raborn 29-yard field goal, 3:13 (MCNS 17-0)

Fourth quarter

- SFA - Terian Goree 5-yard TD pass from Foster Sawyer, Caleb Lewallen kick good, 10:04 (MCNS 17-7)
- SFA - Storm Ruiz 41-yard field goal, 5:59 (MCNS 17-10)

Top passers

- MCNS - James Tabary - 11/20, 78 yards, TD
- SFA - Foster Sawyer - 24/40, 142 yards, TD, INT

Top rushers

- MCNS - David Hamm - 8 carries, 69 yards, TD
- SFA - Jamall Shaw - 9 carries, 40 yards

Top receivers

- MCNS - Austin Nelson - 3 receptions, 42 yards
- SFA - Terian Goree - 11 receptions, 66 yards, TD

=== Abilene Christian ===
Abilene Christian at McNeese State – Game summary

Quarter	1	2	3	4	Total
Wildcats	7	7	0	7	21
No. 9 Cowboys	7	3	7	7	24

at Cowboy Stadium, Lake Charles, LA

- Date: October 6
- Game time: 6:00 p.m. CST
- Game attendance: 10,001
- Referee: Eddy Shelton

Game information

First quarter

- MCNS - Trevor Begue 6-yard TD pass from James Tabary, Gunnar Raborn kick good, 8:15 (MCNS 7-0)
- ACU - Luke Anthony 1-yard TD run, Oscar Hernandez kick good, 2:55 (TIE 7-7)

Second quarter

- MCNS - Raborn 28-yard field goal, 3:04 (MCNS 10-7)
- ACU - Billy McCrary 17-yard TD pass from Anthony, Hernandez kick good, 1:24 (ACU 14-10)

Third quarter

- MCNS - David Hamm 1-yard TD run, Raborn kick good, 9:41 (MCNS 17-14)

Fourth quarter

- MCNS - Cyron Sutton 73-yard punt returned for TD, Raborn kick good, 4:50 (MCNS 24-14)
- ACU - Torin Justice 5-yard TD pass from Anthony, Hernandez kick good, 2:02 (MCNS 24-21)

Top passers

- MCNS - James Tabary - 16/29, 244 yards, TD, 2 INT
- ACU - Luke Anthony - 43/61, 314 yards, 2 TD

Top rushers

- MCNS - Mac Briscoe - 5 carries, 37 yards
- ACU - Tracy James - 7 carries, 40 yards

Top receivers

- MCNS - Cyron Sutton - 3 receptions, 82 yards
- ACU - Kobe Clark - 6 receptions, 78 yards

=== At Incarnate Word ===
McNeese State at Incarnate Word – Game summary

Quarter	1	2	3	4	Total
No. 6 Cowboys	3	0	7	7	17
Cardinals	14	14	10	7	45

at Gayle and Tom Benson Stadium, San Antonio, TX

- Date: October 20
- Game time: 6:00 p.m. CST
- Game attendance: 3,084
- Referee: Vidal Jones
- TV: Eleven Sports/Cox Sports Television

Game information

First quarter

- UIW - Phillip Baptiste 20-yard TD pass from Jon Copeland, Cody Seidel kick good, 12:22 (UIW 7-0)
- MCNS - Gunnar Raborn 37-yard field goal, 6:07 (UIW 7-3)
- UIW - Lamont Johnson 8-yard TD pass from Copeland, Seidel kick good, 2:33 (UIW 14-3)

Second quarter

- UIW - Ra'Quanne Dickens 7-yard TD run, Seidel kick good, 6:53 (UIW 21-3)
- UIW - Copeland 4-yard TD run, Seidel kick good, 2:01 (UIW 28-3)

Third quarter

- MCNS - Kylon Highshaw 4-yard TD pass from James Tabary, Raborn kick good, 12:13 (UIW 28-10)
- UIW - Seidel 35-yard field goal, 6:50 (UIW 31-10)
- UIW - Baptiste 15-yard TD pass from Copeland, Seidel kick good, 1:50 (UIW 38-10)

Fourth quarter

- MCNS - Lawayne Ross 2-yard TD pass from Cody Orgeron, Raborn kick good, 14:56 (UIW 38-17)
- UIW - Louis Otis 37-yard interception returned for TD, Seidel kick good, 6:31 (UIW 45-17)

Top passers

- UIW - Jon Copeland - 24/41, 236 yards, 3 TD, INT
- MCNS - Cody Orgeron - 8/17, 80 yards, TD, INT

Top rushers

- UIW - Ra'Quanne Dickens - 20 carries, 69 yards, TD
- MCNS - Cody Orgeron - 2 carries, 16 yards

Top receivers

- UIW - Phillip Baptiste - 5 receptions, 83 yards, 2 TD
- MCNS - Trevor Begue - 6 receptions, 72 yards

=== Central Arkansas ===
Central Arkansas at McNeese State – Game summary

Quarter	1	2	3	4	Total
No. 13 Bears	7	7	7	0	21
No. 14 Cowboys	17	3	0	3	23

at Cowboy Stadium, Lake Charles, LA

- Date: October 27
- Game time: 6:00 p.m. CST
- Game weather: 73 °F (23 °C); clear
- Game attendance: 11,208
- Referee: Michael VanderVelde
- TV: Eleven Sports/Cox Sports Television

Game information

First quarter

- MCNS - David Hamm 1-yard TD run, Gunnar Raborn kick good, 10:50 (MCNS 7-0)
- UCA - Jakari Dillard 75-yard TD pass from Luke Hales, Matt Cummins kick good, 10:39 (TIE 7-7)
- MCNS - Cody Orgeron 16-yard TD run, Raborn kick good, 9:05 (MCNS 14-7)
- MCNS - Raborn 34-yard field goal, 2:46 (MCNS 17-7)

Second quarter

- MCNS - Raborn 33-yard field goal, 7:48 (MCNS 20-7)
- UCA - Brandon Myers 24-yard TD pass from Hales, Cummins kick good, 4:07 (MCNS 20-14)

Third quarter

- UCA - Carlos Blackman 39-yard TD run, Cummins kick good, 0:13 (UCA 21-20)

Fourth quarter

- MCNS - Raborn 24-yard field goal, 7:27 (MCNS 23-21)

Top passers

- MCNS - Cody Orgeron - 13/21, 135 yards
- UCA - Luke Hales - 13/33, 290 yards, 2 TD, 2 INT

Top rushers

- MCNS - David Hamm - 13 carries, 59 yards, TD
- UCA - Carlos Blackman - 12 carries, 86 yards, TD

Top receivers

- MCNS - Cyron Sutton - 5 receptions, 76 yards
- UCA - Jakari Dillard - 4 receptions, 103 yards, TD

=== At Southeastern Louisiana ===
McNeese State at Southeastern Louisiana – Game summary

Quarter	1	2	3	4	Total
No. 11 Cowboys	0	6	0	0	6
Lions	0	10	7	6	23

at Strawberry Stadium, Hammond, LA

- Date: November 3
- Game time: 2:30 p.m. CST
- Game weather: 73 °F (23 °C); sunny
- Game attendance: 5,127
- Referee: Stephen Baron
- TV: ESPN3/Cox Sports Television

Game information

First quarter

- SELA - Juwan Petit-Frere 6-yard TD pass from Chason Virgil, Jonathan Tatum kick good, 10:05 (SELA 7-0)
- MCNS - Gunnar Raborn 22-yard field goal, 7:18 (SELA 7-3)
- SELA - Tatum 40-yard field goal, 3:59 (SELA 10-3)
- MCNS - Raborn 37-yard field goal, 0:02 (SELA 10-6)

Third quarter

- SELA - Julius Maracalin 41-yard TD run, Tatum kick good, 1:10 (SELA 17-6)

Fourth quarter

- SELA - Tatum 25-yard field goal, 8:53 (SELA 20-6)
- SELA - Tatum 30-yard field goal, 5:29 (SELA 23-6)

Top passers

- SELA - Chason Virgil - 14/28, 162 yards, TD
- MCNS - Cody Orgeron - 13/23, 98 yards, INT

Top rushers

- SELA - Julius Maracalin - 13 carries, 88 yards, TD
- MCNS - Cody Orgeron - 6 carries, 32 yards

Top receivers

- SELA - Cyron Sutton - 6 receptions, 55 yards
- MCNS - Juwan Petit-Frere - 7 receptions, 85 yards, TD

=== At Northwestern State ===
McNeese State at Northwestern State – Game summary

Quarter	1	2	3	4	OT	Total
Cowboys	0	7	14	10	3	34
Demons	0	0	14	17	6	37

at Harry Turpin Stadium, Natchitoches, LA

- Date: November 10
- Game time: 6:00 p.m. CST
- Game weather: 46 °F (8 °C); cloudy
- Game attendance: 6,111
- Referee: Eddy Shelton
- TV: ESPN3

Game information

Second quarter

- MCNS - Trevor Begue 3-yard TD pass from James Tabary, Gunnar Raborn kick good, 1:14 (MCNS 7-0)

Third quarter

- NSU - Jared West 19-yard TD run, Austyn Fendrick kick good, 11:15 (TIE 7-7)
- MCNS - Cyron Sutton 61-yard TD pass from Tabary, Raborn kick good, 10:52 (MCNS 14-7)
- MCNS - Ryan Ross 2-yard TD run, Raborn kick good, 5:10 (MCNS 21-7)
- NSU - Kalen Meggs 27-yard TD pass from Shelton Eppler, Fendrick kick good, 2:24 (MCNS 21-14)

Fourth quarter

- NSU - Fendrick 36-yard field goal, 12:04 (MCNS 21-17)
- MCNS - Rodnell Cruell 26-yard TD pass from Tabary, Raborn kick good, 10:50 (MCNS 28-17)
- NSU - Jazz Ferguson 2-yard TD pass from Eppler, two-point conversion pass no good, 7:35 (MCNS 28-23)
- MCNS - Raborn 27-yard field goal, 2:27 (MCNS 31-28)
- NSU - Jaylen Watson 19-yard TD pass from Eppler, Eppler two-point conversion pass to Ferguson good, 0:27 (TIE 31-31)

First overtime

- MCNS - Raborn 38-yard field goal (MCNS 34-31)
- NSU - Ferguson 6-yard TD pass from Eppler (NSU 37-34)

Top passers

- NSU - Shelton Eppler - 25/46, 292 yards, 4 TD
- MCNS - James Tabary - 15/27, 203 yards, 3 TD

Top rushers

- NSU - Jared West - 12 carries, 61 yards, TD
- MCNS - David Hamm - 11 carries, 49 yards

Top receivers

- NSU - Jazz Ferguson - 9 receptions, 112 yards, 2 TD
- MCNS - Cyron Sutton - 6 receptions, 119 yards, TD

=== Lamar ===
Lamar at McNeese State – Game summary

Quarter	1	2	3	4	Total
Cardinals	7	0	7	7	21
No. 21 Cowboys	0	3	6	8	17

at Cowboy Stadium, Lake Charles, LA

- Date: November 17
- Game time: 3:00 p.m. CST
- Game weather: 70 °F (21 °C); partly cloudy
- Game attendance: 11,532
- Referee: C. Watson
- TV: ESPN3

Game information

First quarter

- LAMR - A. J. Walker 15-yard TD run, Elvin Martinez kick good, 6:31 (LAMR 7-0)

Second quarter

- MCNS - Gunnar Raborn 29-yard field goal, 1:32 (LAMR 7-3)

Third quarter

- LAMR - Case Robinson 36-yard TD pass from Darrel Colbert Jr., Martinez kick good, 4:12 (LAMR 14-3)
- MCNS - Benjamin Jones 99-yard kickoff returned for TD, two-point pass conversion no good, 3:57 (LAMR 14-9)

Fourth quarter

- MCNS - David Hamm 63-yard TD run, James Tabary two-point conversion pass to Ryan Ross good, 14:39 (MCNS 17-14)
- LAMR - Colbert Jr. 1-yard TD run, Martinez kick good, 2:04 (LAMR 21-17)

Top passers

- LAMR - Darrel Colbert Jr. - 9/14, 148 yards, TD
- MCNS - James Tabary - 8/31, 79 yards, INT

Top rushers

- LAMR - Darrel Colbert Jr. - 19 carries, 110 yards, TD
- MCNS - David Hamm - 15 carries, 166 yards, TD

Top receivers

- LAMR - Case Robinson - 2 receptions, 80 yards, TD
- MCNS - Rodnell Cruell - 2 receptions, 31 yards

== Ranking movements ==
Ranking movements Legend: ██ Increase in ranking ██ Decrease in ranking RV = Received votes
	Week													
Poll	Pre	1	2	3	4	5	6	7	8	9	10	11	12	Final
STATS FCS	17	16	16	9	10	9	9	6	14	11	18	22	RV	
Coaches	18	14	15	10	11	10	9	6	16	12	18	21	RV	

== Roster ==
2018 McNeese State Cowboys football team roster
Players
Coaches
Offense

Pos.	#	Name	Class
WR	1	Cyron Sutton	So
QB	2	Cam Smith	Fr
WR	3	Kylon Highshaw	Sr
QB	4	James Tabary	Sr
WR	5	Josh Batiste	Sr
RB	6	Ryan Ross	Sr
WR	7	Tre Roberts	Sr
QB	8	Cody Orgeron	So
WR	9	Dade Dieterich	So
QB	10	Matt Keller	So
WR	11	Quincy Cage	Fr
QB	12	Andrew McBride	Fr
WR	13	Nate Briscoe	Fr
WR	14	Draysean Hudson	Jr
QB	15	Zach Hayes	Fr
WR	19	Parker Orgeron	Jr
RB	20	Justin Pratt	Jr
RB	22	Danuel Oscar	Fr
RB	24	Mac Briscoe	Fr
RB	28	Benjamin Jones	Sr
RB	29	Reggie Williams	Fr
RB	32	David Hamm	Sr
RB	34	J'Cobi Skinner	Fr
TE	36	Dontay Hargrove	So
TE	40	Lawayne Ross	Jr
TE	44	Jacob Logan	So
RB	47	J'uan Gross	Fr
OL	55	Cutter Leftwich	Fr
OL	58	Tanner Pugh	Fr
OL	61	Collin Fountain	So
OL	62	Joe Latronico	So
OL	63	Charley Zeno	Fr
OL	64	Lantz Milam	Fr
OL	66	Tyrae Johnson	Jr
OL	67	Kaleb Barnett	Fr
OL	68	Caleb Gary	So
OL	70	Grant Burguillos	Jr
OL	71	Jamarus Bolding	So
OL	72	Tre Newton	Jr
OL	73	Calvin Barkat	Fr
OL	74	Blaise Scriber	Jr
OL	75	Zach Jones	Jr
OL	77	Kyle Zenon	Sr
OL	78	Jimmy Converse	Sr
OL	79	Nick Holiday	Fr
TE	80	Trey Conerly	Jr
WR	81	Deon Cormier	Fr
WR	83	Trevor Begue	So
TE	85	Austin Nelson	Jr
WR	86	Rodnell Cruell	Sr
WR	87	Trevor Moye	Fr
OL		Kyle Herridge	Fr
RB		Braedan James	Fr
WR		Sa'lan Weber	Fr

Defense

Pos.	#	Name	Class
DB	1	Darion Dunn	So
DB	2	Cory McCoy	So
DB	3	Kyree McClean	Sr
DB	4	Colby Burton	Jr
DB	5	Jovon Burriss	Jr
DB	6	Calum Foster	Jr
DB	7	Gabe Foster	So
LB	8	BJ Blunt	Sr
DB	9	Trent Jackson	Jr
LB	10	Sage Seay	Jr
DB	11	Jordan Bullard	Fr
LB	12	Tre Porter	Sr
DB	16	Colby Richardson	Fr
LB	17	Darius Daniels	Fr
DB	18	Trent Winbush	Fr
DB	21	Andre Sam	Fr
DB	23	Kordell Williams	Fr
DB	25	Kamon Darby	Sr
DB	26	Keshon Bell	So
DB	27	Enos Lewis	Fr
DE	30	Marcus Foster	Jr
DB	31	John Blunt	Fr
DB	33	Chad Tillery	Fr
LB	42	Christian Jacobs	Sr
LB	45	Tahj Samuel	Fr
LB	48	Andrew Hyacinth	So
DE	49	Chris Livings	Jr
DL	52	Harris Tafah	Fr
DL	54	Jonathon Hageon	Fr
DL	56	Christian Robinson	Jr
DL	57	Cody Roscoe	So
DL	90	Jonta Jones	Jr
DL	91	Tyrique Gibson	Fr
DL	92	Keivonnis Davis	Jr
DL	93	Steven Conerly	Fr
DL	94	Ronell Burbank	Fr
DL	95	Chase Davis	Fr
DL	96	C. J. Semien	Fr
DL	97	Camron Peterson	Fr
DL	99	Marval Bourgeois	Jr
DB		Andrew Croker	Fr
LB		Dajuan Jenkins	Fr
DB		Andre Lee	Fr
DL		Cayden Peterson	Fr
DB		Thomas Sparrow	So
DB		Shayhan Williams	Fr
DL		Walter Withers	Fr

Special teams

Pos.	#	Name	Class
K	37	Alex Kjellsten	Sr
P	38	Bailey Raborn	So
LS	39	Jake Smith	Jr
K	43	Gunnar Raborn	Sr
LS	51	Trey Vondenstein	Fr
K/P		Noah Anderson	Fr
K/P		Cade Baggett	Fr
LS		Grayson Broussard	Fr
LS		Shelton Langley	Fr

Head coach

- Lance Guidry (McNeese State)
  Defensive coordinator, Cornerbacks

Coordinators/assistant coaches

- Landon Hoefer (Texas Tech)
  Offensive coordinator, Wide Receivers
- Kerry Joseph (McNeese State)
  Co-Offensive Coordinator, Quarterbacks
- Ben Norton (Stephen F. Austin)
  Assistant Coach, Offensive Line, Running Game Coordinator, Recruiting Coordinator
- Lark Hebert (McNeese State)
  Assistant Coach, Defensive Line
- Zach Bronson (McNeese State)
  Assistant Coach, Cornerbacks
- Dennis Smith (Miami (FL))
  Assistant Coach, Running Backs, Special Teams Coordinator
- Charlie Ayro (McNeese State)
  Assistant Coach, Linebackers
- Wayne Cordova (McNeese State)
  Assistant Coach, Safeties
- Tyler Bolfing (McNeese State)
  Assistant Coach, Tight Ends
- Alec Osborne (Louisiana–Monroe)
  Assistant Coach, Defensive Ends

Legend

- (C) Team captain
- (S) Suspended
- (I) Ineligible
- Injured
- Redshirt

Roster
Last update: August 18, 2018
