= 2018 Sam Houston State Bearkats football team =

American college football season

2018 Sam Houston State Bearkats football
- Conference: Southland Conference
- Record: 6–5 (5–4 Southland)
- Head coach: K. C. Keeler (5th season)
- Offensive coordinator: Ryan Carty (1st season)
- Offensive scheme: No-huddle spread option
- Defensive coordinator: Clayton Carlin (2nd season)
- Base defense: 4–2–5
- Home stadium: Bowers Stadium

2018 Southland Conference football standings
	Conf.			Overall
Team	W		L	W		L
No. 14 Nicholls +^	7	–	2	9	–	4
Incarnate Word +^	6	–	2	6	–	5
Lamar ^	6	–	3	7	–	5
Abilene Christian	5	–	4	6	–	5
Central Arkansas	5	–	4	6	–	5
McNeese State	5	–	4	6	–	5
Sam Houston State	5	–	4	6	–	5
Northwestern State	4	–	5	5	–	6
Southeastern Louisiana	4	–	5	4	–	7
Stephen F. Austin	2	–	7	2	–	8
Houston Baptist	0	–	9	1	–	10
+ – Conference co-champions; ^ – FCS playoff participant; Rankings from STATS poll

The 2018 Sam Houston State Bearkats football team represented Sam Houston State University in the 2018 NCAA Division I FCS football season. The Bearkats were led by fifth-year head coach K. C. Keeler and played their home games at Bowers Stadium. They were a member of the Southland Conference. They finished the season 6–5, 5–4 in Southland play to finish in a four-way tie for fourth place.

== Preseason ==
=== Preseason All-Conference Teams ===
On July 12, 2018, the Southland announced their Preseason All-Conference Teams, with the Bearkats having seven players at nine positions selected.

Offense

1st team

Davion Davis – Sr. WR

Nathan Stewart – Jr. WR

Mitchell Watanabe – Sr. OL

Eric David – Jr. OL

Tristan Wendt – Sr. OL

Davion Davis – Sr. all purpose player

Defense

1st team

Davion Davis – Sr. PR

2nd team

Chris Stewart – Sr. DL

Zyon McCollum – So. DB

=== Preseason poll ===
On July 19, 2018, the Southland announced their preseason poll, with the Bearkats selected as the favorites to win the conference.

=== Award watch lists ===
Award	Player	Position	Year
Walter Payton Award	Davion Davis	WR	SR
Walter Payton Award	Nathan Steward	WR	JR
Buck Buchanan Award	Chris Stewart	DE	SR

== Schedule ==
Date	Time	Opponent	Rank	Site	TV	Result	Attendance
September 8	6:00 p.m.	Prairie View A&M*	No. 4	Bowers Stadium; Huntsville, TX	ESPN+	W 41–32	9,571
September 15	6:00 p.m.	North Dakota*	No. 5	Bowers Stadium; Huntville, TX	ESPN3	L 23–24	5,373
September 22	3:00 p.m.	at No. 18 Nicholls State	No. 11	John L. Guidry Stadium; Thibodaux, LA	ESPN+	L 7–27	5,025
September 29	3:00 p.m.	No. 13 Central Arkansas	No. 21	Bowers Stadium; Huntsville, TX	ESPN3	W 34–31 ^{OT}	7,598
October 6	1:00 p.m.	vs. Stephen F. Austin	No. 17	NRG Stadium; Houston, TX (Battle of the Piney Woods)	ESPN3	W 54–21	26,548
October 13	6:00 p.m.	at Northwestern State	No. 15	Harry Turpin Stadium; Natchitoches, LA	CST/ESPN3	W 42–28	5,125
October 20	3:00 p.m.	at Lamar	No. 14	Provost Umphrey Stadium; Beaumont, TX	ESPN+	L 23–41	7,227
October 27	1:00 p.m.	Southeastern Louisiana^{†}	No. 23	Bowers Stadium; Huntsville, TX	ELVN	W 28–25	10,098
November 3	2:00 p.m.	at Incarnate Word	No. 21	Gayle and Tom Benson Stadium; San Antonio, TX	ESPN3	L 26–43	5,643
November 10	2:30 pm	Abilene Christian		Bowers Stadium; Huntsville, TX	ELVN/SLC Digital	L 10–17	6,914
November 17	2:00 p.m.	at Houston Baptist		Husky Stadium; Houston, TX	SLC Digital	W 42–20	2,002
*Non-conference game; ^{†}Homecoming; Rankings from STATS Poll released prior to the game; All times are in Central time

== Game summaries ==
=== Prairie View A&M ===
Prairie View A&M at Sam Houston State

Team	1	2	3	4	Total
Panthers	9	14	0	9	32
• No. 4 Bearkats	10	17	7	7	41

- Date: September 8
- Location: Bowers Stadium
  Huntsville, TX
- Game start: 6:05 p.m. CDT
- Elapsed time: 3:35
- Game attendance: 9,571
- Game weather: Temperature: 73 °F (23 °C) • Weather: Overcast • Wind: SW 2
- Referee: Eddie Kelley
- TV announcers (ESPN+): Randy McIlvoy, Shea Walker, Matt Pedersen

=== North Dakota ===
North Dakota Fighting Hawks at Sam Houston State

Team	1	2	3	4	Total
• Fighting Hawks	7	10	0	7	24
No. 5 Bearkats	7	3	13	0	23

- Date: September 15
- Location: Bowers Stadium
  Huntsville, TX
- Game start: 6:05 p.m. CDT
- Elapsed time: 3:07
- Game attendance: 5,373
- Game weather: Temperature: 88 °F (31 °C) • Weather: Clear • Wind: ESE 4
- Referee: Kevin Boitmann
- TV announcers (ESPN3): Randy McIlvoy, Shea Walker, Sarah Merrifield

=== At Nicholls State ===
Sam Houston State at Nicholls State

Team	1	2	3	4	Total
No. 11 Bearkats	7	0	0	0	7
• No. 18 Colonels	3	7	3	14	27

- Date: September 22
- Location: John L. Guidry Stadium
  Thibodaux, LA
- Game start: 6:24 p.m. CDT
- Elapsed time: 2:52
- Game attendance: 5,025
- Game weather: Temperature: 82 °F (28 °C) • Weather: Rainy, Overcast • Wind: SE 6
- Referee: M. Vandervelde
- TV announcers (ESPN+): Kooter Roberson, E.P. Garth, Brian Adams

=== Central Arkansas ===
Central Arkansas at Sam Houston State

Team	1	2	3	4	OT	Total
No. 13 Bears	3	7	7	14	0	31
• No. 21 Bearkats	0	14	14	3	3	34

- Date: September 29
- Location: Bowers Stadium
  Huntsville, TX
- Game start: 3:05 p.m. CDT
- Elapsed time: 3:52
- Game attendance: 7,598
- Game weather: Temperature: 77 °F (25 °C) • Weather: Drizzly & Overcast • Wind: ESE 4
- Referee: Mike Defee
- TV announcers (ESPN3): Randy McIlvoy, Shea Walker

=== vs Stephen F. Austin ===
Battle of the Piney Woods

Team	1	2	3	4	Total
Lumberjacks	14	0	0	7	21
• No. 17 Bearkats	21	23	10	0	54

- Date: October 6
- Location: NRG Stadium
  Houston, TX
- TV announcers (ESPN3): Ted Emrich, Shea Walker, Julie Dobbs

=== At Northwestern State ===
Sam Houston State at Northwestern State

Team	1	2	3	4	Total
• No. 15 Bearkats	14	9	11	8	42
Demons	0	28	0	0	28

- Date: October 13
- Location: Harry Turpin Stadium
  Natchitoches, LA
- Game start: 6:00 pm CDT
- Game attendance: 5,125
- Game weather: Rainy
- Referee: Kevin Boitmann
- Television network: CST/ESPN3

=== At Lamar ===
Sam Houston State at Lamar

Team	1	2	3	4	Total
No. 14 Bearkats	13	0	10	0	23
• Cardinals	10	7	17	7	41

- Date: October 20
- Location: Provost Umphrey Stadium
  Beaumont, TX
- Game start: 3:00 p.m. CDT
- Elapsed time: 3:14
- Game attendance: 7,227
- Game weather: Overcast Temp: 74 Wind 9 mph
- Referee: Ed Bourgeois
- Television network: ESPN+

=== Southeastern Louisiana ===
Southeastern Louisiana at Sam Houston State (homecoming)

Team	1	2	3	4	Total
Lions	0	10	0	15	25
• No. 23 Bearkats	14	0	7	7	28

- Date: October 27
- Location: Bowers Stadium
  Huntsville, TX
- Game start: 1:05 pm CDT
- Elapsed time: 3:23
- Game attendance: 10,098
- Game weather: Clear Temp: 76 Wind: WSW 8mph
- Referee: Dan Lewis
- Television network: ELVN

=== At Incarnate Word ===
Sam Houston State at Incarnate Word

Team	1	2	Total
No. 21 Bearkats			0
Cardinals			0

- Date: November 3
- Location: Gayle and Tom Benson Stadium
  San Antonio, TX
- Game start: 2:00 p.m. CDT
- Television network: ESPN3

=== Abilene Christian ===
Abilene Christian at Sam Houston State

Team	1	2	3	4	Total
• Wildcats	7	0	7	3	17
Bearkats	0	3	7	0	10

- Date: November 10
- Location: Bowers Stadium
  Huntsville, TX
- Game start: 2:30 pm CST
- Television network: ELVN/SLC Digital

=== At Houston Baptist ===
Sam Houston State at Houston Baptist

Team	1	2	3	4	Total
• Bearkats	7	21	14	0	42
Lions	3	7	3	7	20

- Date: November 17
- Location: Husky Stadium
  Houston, TX
- Game start: 2:00 p.m. CST
- Television network: SLC Digital

== Ranking movements ==
Ranking movements Legend: ██ Increase in ranking ██ Decrease in ranking — = Not ranked RV = Received votes
	Week													
Poll	Pre	1	2	3	4	5	6	7	8	9	10	11	12	Final
STATS FCS	4	4	5	11	21	17	15	14	23	21	RV	RV	RV	
Coaches	4	4	4	11	19	16	14	10	22	22	RV	—	—	
