= 2018 Stephen F. Austin Lumberjacks football team =

American college football season

2018 Stephen F. Austin Lumberjacks football
- Conference: Southland Conference
- Record: 2–8 (2–7 Southland)
- Head coach: Jeff Byrd (interim)
- Offensive coordinator: Kevin Barbay (1st season)
- Co-offensive coordinator: Jeremy Moses (1st season)
- Defensive coordinator: Jeff Byrd (2nd season)
- Home stadium: Homer Bryce Stadium

2018 Southland Conference football standings
	Conf.			Overall
Team	W		L	W		L
No. 14 Nicholls +^	7	–	2	9	–	4
Incarnate Word +^	6	–	2	6	–	5
Lamar ^	6	–	3	7	–	5
Abilene Christian	5	–	4	6	–	5
Central Arkansas	5	–	4	6	–	5
McNeese State	5	–	4	6	–	5
Sam Houston State	5	–	4	6	–	5
Northwestern State	4	–	5	5	–	6
Southeastern Louisiana	4	–	5	4	–	7
Stephen F. Austin	2	–	7	2	–	8
Houston Baptist	0	–	9	1	–	10
+ – Conference co-champions; ^ – FCS playoff participant; Rankings from STATS poll

The 2018 Stephen F. Austin football team represented Stephen F. Austin State University in the 2018 NCAA Division I FCS football season. The Lumberjacks were led by interim head coach Jeff Byrd and played their home games at Homer Bryce Stadium. They were a member of the Southland Conference. They finished the season 2–8, 2–7 in Southland play to finish in tenth place.

On June 18, head coach Clint Conque was suspended indefinitely pending an investigation into alleged violations of university policy. On August 6, Conque announced his resignation from SFA.

== Preseason ==
=== Preseason All-Conference Teams ===
On July 12, 2018, the Southland announced their Preseason All-Conference Teams, with the Lumberjacks having five players selected at six positions.

Defense First Team

- Alize Ward – Jr. DB

Offense Second Team

- Tamrick Pace – Jr. WR
- Alize Ward – Jr. all purpose player
- Caleb Lewallen – Sr. P
Defense Second Team
- Ryan Woods – Sr. LB
- Trenton Gordon – So. DB

=== Preseason poll ===
On July 19, 2018, the Southland announced their preseason poll, with the Lumberjacks predicted to finish in sixth place.

== Schedule ==
Date	Time	Opponent	Site	TV	Result	Attendance
September 1	6:30 p.m.	at No. 18 (FBS) Mississippi State*	Davis Wade Stadium; Starkville, MS	ESPNU	L 6–63	54,289
September 8	6:00 p.m.	Tarleton State*	Homer Bryce Stadium; Nacogdoches, TX		Cancelled (Note: Game was cancelled due to inclement weather.)	
September 15	6:00 p.m.	at Incarnate Word	Gayle and Tom Benson Stadium; San Antonio, TX	UIWtv	L 7–31	3,311
September 22	6:00 p.m.	Abilene Christian	Homer Bryce Stadium; Nacogdoches, TX	ESPN+	W 24–21	6,281
September 29	6:00 p.m.	at No. 10 McNeese State	Cowboy Stadium; Lake Charles, LA	Cowboy Insider	L 10–17	8,933
October 6	1:00 p.m.	vs. No. 17 Sam Houston State	NRG Stadium; Houston, TX (Battle of the Piney Woods)	ESPN3	L 21–54	26,548
October 13	3:00 p.m.	No. 18 Central Arkansas	Homer Bryce Stadium; Nacogdoches, TX	ESPN3	L 17–27	5,976
October 20	6:00 p.m.	at Houston Baptist	Husky Stadium; Houston, TX	ESPN3	W 42–14	2,687
October 27	3:00 p.m.	Lamar^{†}	Homer Bryce Stadium; Nacogdoches, TX	ESPN+	L 17–24	6,321
November 10	3:00 p.m.	at No. 17 Nicholls State	John L. Guidry Stadium; Thibodaux, LA	CST/ESPN3	L 14–47	7,025
November 15	6:00 p.m.	Northwestern State	Homer Bryce Stadium; Nacogdoches, TX (Chief Caddo)	ELVN, SLC Digital	L 23–35	2,611
*Non-conference game; ^{†}Homecoming; Rankings from STATS Poll released prior to the game; All times are in Central time

== Game summaries ==
=== At Mississippi State ===
	1	2	3	4	Total
Lumberjacks	0	3	3	0	6
No. 18 (FBS) Bulldogs	21	14	14	14	63

=== Abilene Christian ===
	1	2	3	4	Total
Wildcats	0	7	7	7	21
Lumberjacks	3	7	7	7	24

=== At McNeese State ===
	1	2	3	4	Total
Lumberjacks	0	0	0	10	10
No. 10 Cowboys	14	0	3	0	17

=== vs Sam Houston State ===
	1	2	3	4	Total
No. 17 Bearkats	21	23	10	0	54
Lumberjacks	14	0	0	7	21

=== Central Arkansas ===
	1	2	3	4	Total
No. 18 Bears	7	3	14	3	27
Lumberjacks	7	0	3	7	17

=== At Houston Baptist ===
	1	2	3	4	Total
Lumberjacks	7	7	14	14	42
Huskies	7	0	7	0	14

=== Lamar ===
	1	2	3	4	Total
Cardinals	7	10	7	0	24
Lumberjacks	0	0	7	10	17

=== At Nicholls State ===
	1	2	3	4	Total
Lumberjacks	0	0	7	7	14
No. 17 Colonels	14	10	13	10	47

=== Northwestern State ===
	1	2	3	4	Total
Demons	0	7	14	14	35
Lumberjacks	0	16	0	7	23
