= 2018 Southeastern Louisiana Lions football team =

American college football season

2018 Southeastern Louisiana Lions football
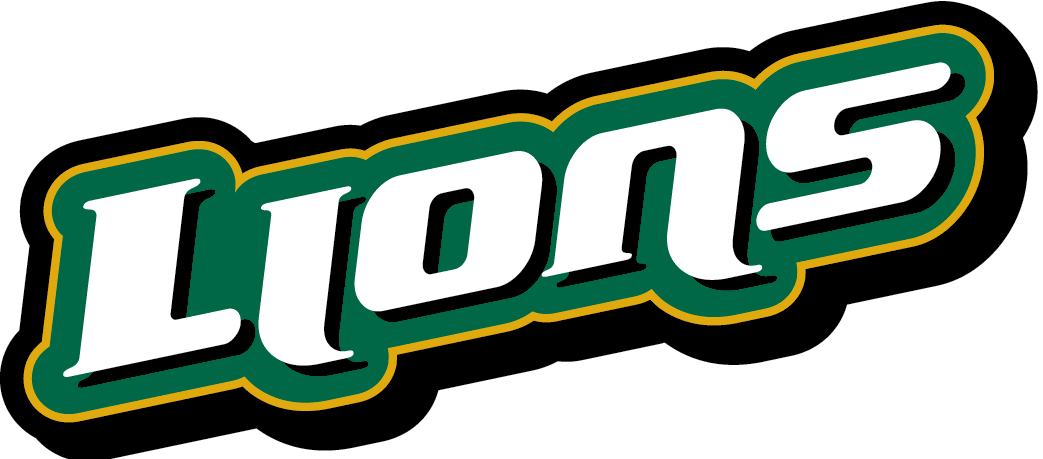
- Conference: Southland Conference
- Record: 4–7 (4–5 Southland)
- Head coach: Frank Scelfo (1st season)
- Offensive coordinator: Greg Stevens (3rd season)
- Defensive coordinator: Louie Cioffi (1st season)
- Home stadium: Strawberry Stadium

2018 Southland Conference football standings
	Conf.			Overall
Team	W		L	W		L
No. 14 Nicholls +^	7	–	2	9	–	4
Incarnate Word +^	6	–	2	6	–	5
Lamar ^	6	–	3	7	–	5
Abilene Christian	5	–	4	6	–	5
Central Arkansas	5	–	4	6	–	5
McNeese State	5	–	4	6	–	5
Sam Houston State	5	–	4	6	–	5
Northwestern State	4	–	5	5	–	6
Southeastern Louisiana	4	–	5	4	–	7
Stephen F. Austin	2	–	7	2	–	8
Houston Baptist	0	–	9	1	–	10
+ – Conference co-champions; ^ – FCS playoff participant; Rankings from STATS poll

The 2018 Southeastern Louisiana Lions football team represented Southeastern Louisiana University in the 2018 NCAA Division I FCS football season. The Lions were led by first-year head coach Frank Scelfo and played their home games at Strawberry Stadium. They were a member of the Southland Conference. They finished the season 4–7, 4–5 in Southland play to finish in a tie for eighth place.

== Preseason ==
=== Preseason All-Conference Teams ===
On July 12, 2018, the Southland announced their Preseason All-Conference Teams, with the Lions having four players selected.

Defense First Team

- Juwan Petit-Frere – Jr. KR

Offense Second Team

- Marcus Cooper – So. RB
- Alfred Beverly – Jr. OL
Defense Second Team
- Tamarcus Russell – Sr. LB

=== Preseason poll ===
On July 19, 2018, the Southland announced their preseason poll, with the Lions predicted to finish in fifth place.

== Roster ==
2018 Southeastern Louisiana Lions football team roster
Players
Coaches
Offense

Pos.	#	Name	Class
RB	1	DeVonte Williams	Jr
QB	4	Byron Walker	So
WR	5	Juwan Petit-Frere	Jr
WR	8	Jariah Tolbert	Sr
QB	9	Chason Virgil	Jr
QB	10	Lorenzo Nunez	Jr
QB	11	Chris Penton	Fr
WR	12	Nih-Jer Jackson	Sr
QB	13	Joey Verhaegh	Sr
QB	14	Jacob Williams	Jr
RB	15	Marcus Cooper	So
WR	16	Jake Ingraffia	Sr
RB	18	Jomari Becnel	Jr
WR	19	Javon Connor	Jr
RB	20	Travon Stokes	Fr
RB	22	Julius Maracalin	Sr
WR	23	Grant Alexander	Fr
RB	24	Darren Johnson	Sr
RB	27	Tony Huey	Fr
WR	28	Ahmad Munoz	Fr
RB	31	Taron Jones	Fr
RB	33	Delmonte Hall	So
FB	38	Damien Dawson	So
FB	40	Zeke Jenkins	Jr
TE	45	Tanner Olsen	Fr
OL	51	Lorenz Jones	Sr
OL	52	Pat Allen	Jr
OL	53	Shaq McClain	Jr
OL	54	Tyree' Rhodes	Fr
OL	56	Tarveres Tate Jr.	So
OL	60	Jordan Tate	Fr
OL	61	Rendon Miles-Character	So
OL	62	William Granville	Fr
OL	63	Blake Harrison	Fr
OL	65	Kaleb Hogg	Fr
OL	66	Brendon Kelley	Fr
OL	67	Brennan Lanclos	Fr
OL	68	Calvin Legrone	Fr
OL	71	Alfred Beverly III	Jr
OL	73	Brandon McElveen	Fr
OL	74	Jarius Gooch	Jr
OL	76	Kyle Strickland	Sr
OL	79	Drew Jones	So
WR	80	Jacq'Co Price	Jr
WR	81	Austin Mitchell	So
WR	82	Ross Foreman	Sr
WR	83	CJ Turner	Fr
WR	84	Bryson Brewer	Fr
WR	85	Marquis Williams	Jr
WR	86	Shyron White	Fr
WR	87	Joshua Carver	Fr
TE	88	Bransen Schwebel	Jr
TE	89	Dalton Brabham	So

Defense

Pos.	#	Name	Class
DB	2	Zeke Walkesr	Sr
DB	3	Shamar Busby	Sr
DB	6	Dejion Lynch	Jr
DB	7	Xavier Lewis	Jr
DB	11	Matthew Wright	Jr
LB	14	Arlen Williams	Fr
DB	16	D'Andre Nolden	Fr
DB	17	Marcell Selmon Jr.	Jr
DB	18	Trey Joseph	Fr
DB	19	Kerry Moore	Fr
DB	20	Aaron Craig	Sr
DB	21	Brayleon Thomas	Sr
DB	23	Ferlando Jordan	Fr
DB	25	Tre' Spann	Jr
DB	26	Marquis Johnson	Fr
DB	27	Xavier Chatman	Sr
DB	28	Keith Benjamin	Jr
DB	29	Jordan Griffin	Fr
DB	31	Garland Robertson	Fr
LB	32	Mike Mason	Jr
LB	34	Michael Sproles	Fr
DB	36	Darius Doakes	Jr
LB	38	Wesley Brown	Fr
DB	41	Donniel Ward-Magee	Fr
LB	42	Tamarcus Russell	Sr
LB	43	Troy Kruchten	Fr
LB	44	Dwaine Thomas	Sr
LB	45	Joshua Carr Jr.	Fr
LB	45	Derron Thompson	Fr
LB	46	Ja'Hmal Macklin	Sr
LB	48	Kyle Nevels	Jr
LB	49	Will Douglas	So
LB	50	Sean Clavelle	Sr
DL	55	Steven Wright	Jr
LB	57	Josh Cook	Fr
LB	58	David Fields	Jr
LB	59	Joshua Martin	Jr
LB	84	Terrance Coleman	Fr
DL	90	Imani Mitchell	Sr
DL	91	Isaac Adeyemi-Berglund	So
DL	92	Jon Miller	Sr
DL	93	Fred Brown	Jr
DL	95	Ronald Cherry III	So
DL	96	Tainano Gaulua	So
DL	97	Feletoa Ailua	So
DL	98	Noah Vance	So
DL	99	Dante Carter	Fr

Special teams

Pos.	#	Name	Class
P	25	Luke Colona	Fr
P	30	Jim Speights	Sr
K/P	33	Nathan Holliday	Fr
K	39	Jonathan Tatum	Sr
P	47	Ivy Wall	Jr
LS	51	Billy Walch	Fr
LS	69	Anthony Freeman	Sr
K	95	Lane Perrin	Fr

Head coach

- Frank Scelfo (Northeast Louisiana)

Coordinators/assistant coaches

- Greg Stevens (Eastern Oregon)
  Offensive coordinator/quarterbacks
- Louie Cioffi (Stony Brook)
  Defensive coordinator
- Brandon Lacy (Kansas)
  Defensive line, run game coordinator
- Tarence Calais (Louisiana Tech)
  Defensive backs, recruiting coordinator
- Garret Chachere (Tulane)
  Running backs, passing game coordinator
- Travis Mikel (Delta State)
  Offensive line
- Micheal Spurlock (Mississippi)
  Wide receivers/Special Teams Coordinators
- Chris Lachney (Southeastern Louisiana)
  Linebackers
- A. J. Hopp (Slippery Rock)
  Tight ends/Offensive Line
- Ross Jenkins (Louisiana Tech)
  Special teams/offensive assistant
- Jarren Horton (Central Washington)
  Safeties, Defensive Assistant
- Greg Dennie (LSU)
  Defensive assistant/analytics

Legend

- (C) Team captain
- (S) Suspended
- (I) Ineligible
- Injured
- Redshirt

Roster
Last update: May 4, 2019

== Schedule ==
Date	Time	Opponent	Site	TV	Result	Attendance
August 30	7:00 p.m.	at Louisiana–Monroe*	Malone Stadium; Monroe, LA	ESPN+	L 31–34	10,137
September 8	6:00 p.m.	at No. 11 (FBS) LSU*	Tiger Stadium; Baton Rouge, LA	ESPN2, ESPNU	L 0–31	96,883
September 15	7:00 p.m.	No. 18 Central Arkansas	Strawberry Stadium; Hammond, LA	ESPN+	L 25–33	6,485
September 22	6:00 p.m.	at Lamar	Provost Umphrey Stadium; Beaumont, TX	ESPN3	W 30–24	8,017
September 29	7:00 p.m.	Northwestern State	Strawberry Stadium; Hammond, LA (rivalry)	CST	W 24–17	5,118
October 6	4:00 p.m.	at Incarnate Word	Gayle and Tom Benson Stadium; San Antonio, TX	UIWtv	L 34–52	2,345
October 13	4:00 p.m.	Houston Baptist^{†}	Strawberry Stadium; Hammond, LA	SE Channel	W 62–52	6,023
October 20	7:00 p.m.	Abilene Christian	Strawberry Stadium; Hammond, LA	SE Channel	L 27–48	4,724
October 27	1:05 pm	at No. 23 Sam Houston State	Bowers Stadium; Huntsville, TX	ELVN	L 25–28	10,098
November 3	7:00 p.m.	No. 11 McNeese State	Strawberry Stadium; Hammond, LA	CST	W 23–6	5,127
November 15	6:00 p.m.	at No. 18 Nicholls	John L. Guidry Stadium; Thibodaux, LA (River Bell Classic)	CST/ESPN3	L 0–44	9,454
*Non-conference game; ^{†}Homecoming; Rankings from STATS Poll released prior to the game; All times are in Central time

== Game summaries ==
=== At Louisiana–Monroe ===
Southeastern Louisiana at Louisiana-Monroe – Game summary

Quarter	1	2	3	4	Total
Lions	14	7	0	10	31
Warhawks	7	9	10	8	34

at Malone Stadium, Monroe, LA

- Date: August 1
- Game time: 7:00 p.m. CST
- Game weather: 91 °F (33 °C); partly cloudy
- Game attendance: 10,137
- Referee: Jason Autrey
- TV: ESPN+

Game information

First quarter

- ULM - Derrick Gore 2-yard TD run, Craig Ford kick good, 9:41 (ULM 7-0)
- SELA - Austin Mitchell 9-yard TD pass from Chason Virgil, Jonathan Tatum kick good, 5:16 (TIE 7-7)
- SELA - Lorenzo Nunez 15-yard TD pass from Virgil, Tatum kick good, 3:40 (SELA 14-7)

Second quarter

- ULM - Ford 22-yard field goal, 13:02 (SELA 14-10)
- ULM - Marcus Green 3-yard TD pass from Caleb Evans, Ford kick no good, 7:21 (ULM 16-14)
- SELA - Juwan Petit-Frere 59-yard TD pass from Virgil, Tatum kick good, 5:56 (SELA 21-16)

Third quarter

- ULM - Green 79-yard TD pass from Evans, Ford kick good, 12:56 (ULM 23-21)
- ULM - Ford 28-yard field goal, 1:21 (ULM 26-21)

Fourth quarter

- SELA - Tatum 34-yard field goal, 14:55 (ULM 26-24)
- SELA - Petit-Frere 34-yard TD pass from Virgil, Tatum kick good, 8:23 (SELA 31-26)
- ULM - Evans 11-yard TD run, Evans two-point conversion good, 0:37 (ULM 34-31)

Top passers

- ULM - Caleb Evans - 35/53, 346 yards, 2 TD, INT
- SELA - Chason Virgil - 28/39, 358 yards, 4 TD, INT

Top rushers

- ULM - Derrick Gore - 21 carries, 104 yards, TD
- SELA - Devonte Williams - 6 carries, 27 yards

Top receivers

- ULM - Marcus Green - 7 receptions, 99 yards, 2 TD
- SELA - Juwan Petit-Frere - 5 receptions, 148 yards, 2 TD

=== At LSU ===
Southeastern Louisiana at LSU – Game summary

Quarter	1	2	3	4	Total
Lions	0	0	0	0	0
No. 11 (FBS) Tigers	14	10	0	7	31

at Tiger Stadium, Baton Rouge, LA

- Date: September 8
- Game time: 6:00 p.m. CST
- Game weather: 90 °F (32 °C); fair
- Game attendance: 96,883
- Referee: James Carter
- TV: ESPN2

Game information

First quarter

- LSU - Ja'Marr Chase - 9-yard TD pass from Joe Burrow, Cole Tracy kick good, 7:15 (LSU 7-0)
- LSU - Burrow 1-yard TD run, Tracy kick good, 3:20 (LSU 14-0)

Second quarter

- LSU - Tracy 50-yard field goal, 11:21 (LSU 21-0)
- LSU - Stephen Sullivan 40-yard TD pass from Burrow, Tracy kick good, 0:00 (LSU 28-0)

Fourth quarter

- LSU - Clyde Edwards-Helaire 7-yard TD run, Tracy kick good, 2:03 (LSU 31-0)

Top passers

- LSU - Joe Burrow - 10/20, 151 yards, 2 TD
- SELA - Chason Virgil - 23/33, 189 yards, INT

Top rushers

- LSU - Nick Brossette - 19 carries, 137 yards
- SELA - Lorenzo Nunez - 11 carries, 64 yards

Top receivers

- LSU - Stephen Sullivan - 2 receptions, 54 yards, TD
- SELA - Juwan Petit-Frere - 5 receptions, 60 yards

=== Central Arkansas ===
Central Arkansas at Southeastern Louisiana – Game summary

Quarter	1	2	3	4	Total
No. 18 Bears	0	13	14	6	33
Lions	7	3	7	8	25

at Strawberry Stadium, Hammond, LA

- Date: September 15
- Game time: 7:00 p.m. CST
- Game attendance: 6,485
- Referee: Cal McNeill
- TV: ESPN+

Game information

First quarter

- SELA - Darren Johnson 2-yard TD run, Jonathan Tatum kick good, 11:00 (SELA 7-0)

Second quarter

- UCA - Brandon Myers 43-yard TD pass from Breylin Smith, two-point pass conversion attempt no good, 9:49 (SELA 7-6)
- UCA - Cedric Battle 40-yard TD pass from Smith, Matt Cummins kick good, 0:49 (UCA 13-7)
- SELA - Tatum 41-yard field goal, 0:00 (UCA 13-10)

Third quarter

- UCA - Carlos Blackman 6-yard TD run, Cummins kick good, 12:13 (UCA 20-10)
- UCA - Jakari Dillard 15-yard TD pass from Smith, Cummins kick good, 11:10 (UCA 27-10)
- SELA - Marcus Cooper 2-yard TD run, Tatum kick good, 0:12 (UCA 27-17)

Fourth quarter

- UCA - Myers 61-yard TD pass from Smith, Cummins kick no good, 14:49 (UCA 33-17)
- SELA - Bransen Schwebel 11-yard TD pass from Chason Virgil, Virgil two-point conversion pass from Schwebel good, 1:24 (UCA 33-25)

Top passers

- UCA - Breylin Smith - 22/31, 329 yards, 4 TD
- SELA - Chason Virgil - 26/51, 384 yards, TD, INT

Top rushers

- UCA - Carlos Blackman - 13 carries, 70 yards, TD
- SELA - Chason Virgil - 10 carries, 53 yards

Top receivers

- UCA - Brandon Myers - 4 receptions, 170 yards, 2 TD
- SELA - Juwan Petit-Frere - 4 receptions, 110 yards

=== At Lamar ===
Southeastern Louisiana at Lamar – Game summary

Quarter	1	2	3	4	Total
Lions	7	3	7	13	30
Cardinals	6	11	0	7	24

at Provost Umphrey Stadium, Beaumont, TX

- Date: September 22
- Game time: 6:00 p.m. CST
- Game weather: 80 °F (27 °C); cloudy and rainy
- Game attendance: 8,017
- Referee: Vidal Jones
- TV: ESPN3

Game information

First quarter

- SELA - Devonte Williams 6-yard TD run, Jonathan Tatum kick good, 12:25 (SELA 7-0)
- LAM - Davon Jernigan 53-yard interception returned for TD, two-point pass conversion no good, 6:47 (SELA 7-6)

Second quarter

- LAM - Darrel Colbert Jr. 2-yard TD run, Colbert Jr. two-point conversion pass to Case Robinson good, 6:41 (LAM 14-7)
- SELA - Tatum 36-yard field goal, 4:59 (LAM 14-10)
- LAM - Elvin Martinez 32-yard field goal, 0:42 (LAM 17-10)

Third quarter

- SELA - Austin Mitchell 26-yard TD pass from Chason Virgil, Tatum kick good, 11:42 (TIE 17-17)

Fourth quarter

- SELA - Tatum 22-yard field goal, 13:58 (SELA 20-17)
- SELA - Bransen Schwebel 9-yard TD pass from Virgil, Tatum kick good, 10:48 (SELA 27-17)
- LAM - Dewan Thompson 22-yard TD pass from Colbert Jr., Martinez kick good, 5:44 (SELA 27-24)
- SELA - Tatum 23-yard field goal, 0:35 (SELA 30-24)

Top passers

- SELA - Chason Virgil - 27/44, 285 yards, 2 TD, INT
- LAM - Darrel Colbert Jr. - 15/27, 171 yards, TD, 2 INT

Top rushers

- SELA - Devonte Williams - 16 carries, 62 yards, TD
- LAM - A. J. Walker - 9 carries, 88 yards

Top receivers

- SELA - Bransen Schwebel - 6 receptions, 98 yards, TD
- LAM - Kirkland Banks - 3 receptions, 43 yards

=== Northwestern State ===
Northwestern State at Southeastern Louisiana – Game summary

Quarter	1	2	3	4	Total
Demons	3	0	0	14	17
Lions	7	14	3	0	24

at Strawberry Stadium, Hammond, LA

- Date: September 29
- Game time: 7:00 p.m. CST
- Game weather: 80 °F (27 °C); cloudy
- Game attendance: 5,118
- Referee: C. Watson
- TV: CST

Game information

First quarter

- SELA - Austin Mitchell 76-yard TD pass from Chason Virgil, Jonathan Tatum kick good, 14:25 (SELA 7-0)
- NSU - Austyn Fendrick 36-yard field goal, 8:54 (SELA 7-3)

Second quarter

- SELA - CJ Turner 8-yard TD pass from Virgil, Tatum kick good, 13:05 (SELA 14-3)
- SELA - Lorenzo Nunez 1-yard TD run, Tatum kick good, 2:29 (SELA 21-3)

Third quarter

- SELA - Tatum 24-yard field goal, 10:53 (SELA 24-3)

Fourth quarter

- NSU - Jaylen Watson 11-yard TD pass from Shelton Eppler, Fendrick kick good, 11:18 (SELA 24-10)
- NSU - Blake Stephenson 0-yard fumble return for TD, Fendrick kick good, 5:34 (SELA 24-17)

Top passers

- SELA - Chason Virgil - 19/28, 316 yards, 2 TD, INT
- NSU - Shelton Eppler - 25/40, 268 yards, TD

Top rushers

- SELA - Darren Johnson - 7 carries, 22 yards
- NSU - Jared West - 22 carries, 137 yards

Top receivers

- SELA - Austin Mitchell - 5 receptions, 182 yards, TD
- NSU - Jazz Ferguson - 6 receptions, 117 yards

=== At Incarnate Word ===
Southeastern Louisiana at Incarnate Word – Game summary

Quarter	1	2	3	4	Total
Lions	14	7	0	13	34
Cardinals	3	28	14	7	52

at Gayle and Tom Benson Stadium, San Antonio, TX

- Date: October 6
- Game time: 4:00 p.m. CST
- Game attendance: 2,345
- Referee: Dan Lewis

Game information

First quarter

- SELA - Juwan Petit-Frere 71-yard TD run, Jonathan Tatum kick good, 11:52 (SELA 7-0)
- UIW - Rhett Marshall 47-yard field goal, 8:58 (SELA 7-3)
- SELA - Petit-Frere 74-yard TD pass from Chason Virgil, Tatum kick good, 8:20 (SELA 14-3)

Second quarter

- UIW - Ra'Quanne Dickens 4-yard TD run, Cody Seidel kick good, 11:38 (SELA 14-10)
- UIW - Darrius Montgomery 55-yard interception returned for TD, Seidel kick good, 8:16 (UIW 17-14)
- UIW - Ameer King 7-yard TD run, Seidel kick good, 1:30 (UIW 24-14)
- SELA - Darren Johnson 15-yard Td pass from Virgil, Tatum kick good, 0:37 (UIW 24-21)
- UIW - Phillip Baptiste 35-yard TD pass from Jon Copeland, Seidel kick good, 0:09 (UIW 31-21)

Third quarter

- UIW - Luke Termin 0-yard fumble return for TD, Seidel kick good, 10:50 (UIW 38-21)
- UIW - Kam Williams 11-yard TD pass from Copeland, Seidel kick good, 3:10 (UIW 45-21)

Fourth quarter

- SELA - Devonte Williams 1-yard TD run, two-point pass conversion attempt no good, 10:07 (UIW 45-27)
- UIW - Baptiste 43-yard TD pass from Copeland, Seidel kick good, 8:17 (UIW 52-27)
- SELA - Johnson 3-yard TD run, Tatum kick good, 0:38 (UIW 52-34)

Top passers

- UIW - Jon Copeland - 23/37, 411 yards, 3 TD
- SELA - Chason Virgil - 27/41, 315 yards, 2 TD, 2 INT

Top rushers

- UIW - Ameer King - 17 carries, 180 yards, TD
- SELA - Darren Johnson - 11 carries, 67 yards, TD

Top receivers

- UIW - Phillip Baptiste - 7 receptions, 174 yards, 2 TD
- SELA - Juwan Petit-Frere - 6 receptions, 131 yards, TD

=== Houston Baptist ===
Houston Baptist at Southeastern Louisiana – Game summary

Quarter	1	2	3	4	Total
Huskies	0	23	14	15	52
Lions	21	14	7	20	62

at Strawberry Stadium, Hammond, LA

- Date: October 13
- Game time: 4:00 p.m. CST
- Game weather: 83 °F (28 °C); sunny
- Game attendance: 6,023
- Referee: Vidal Jones
- TV: Southeastern Channel

Game information

First quarter

- SELA - Devonte Williams 11-yard TD run, Jonathan Tatum kick good, 6:31 (SELA 7-0)
- SELA - Zeke Walker 33-yard interception returned for TD, Tatum kick good, 5:43 (SELA 14-0)
- SELA - Bransen Schwebel 4-yard TD pass from Lorenzo Nunez, Tatum kick good, 1:27 (SELA 21-0)

Second quarter

- SELA - Tre' Spann 50-yard interception returned for TD, Tatum kick good, 14:51 (SELA 28-0)
- HBU - Tyler Blanchard 36-yard field goal, 11:15 (SELA 28-3)
- HBU - Caleb Johnson 18-yard fumble return for TD, Blanchard kick good, 8:01 (SELA 28-10)
- SELA - Jake Ingraffia 16-yard TD pass from Chason Virgil, Tatum kick good, 4:27 (SELA 35-10)
- HBU - Terry Tillmon 42-yard TD pass from Jarreth Sterns, Blanchard kick no good, 1:23 (SELA 35-16)
- HBU - Kyle Bowling 35-yard interception returned for TD, Blanchard kick good, 1:05 (SELA 35-23)

Third quarter

- SELA - Darren Johnson 6-yard TD run, Tatum kick good, 12:57 (SELA 42-23)
- HBU - Sterns 3-yard TD pass from Bailey Zappe, Blanchard kick good, 8:07 (SELA 42-30)
- HBU - Tillmon 41-yard TD pass from Zappe, Blanchard kick good, 4:35 (SELA 42-37)

Fourth quarter

- HBU - Ladarius Dickens 1-yard TD run, Zappe two-point conversion pass to Jaylon Johnson good, 14:55 (HBU 45-42)
- SELA - Tatum 42-yard field goal, 13:38 (TIE 45-45)
- SELA - Tatum 20-yard field goal, 8:00 (SELA 48-45)
- HBU - Sterns 8-yard TD pass from Zappe, Blanchard kick good, 5:16 (HBU 52-48)
- SELA - CJ Turner 15-yard TD pass from Virgil, Tatum kick good, 0:40 (SELA 55-52)
- SELA - Xavier Lewis 38-yard fumble return for TD, Tatum kick good, 0:16 (SELA 62-52)

Top passers

- SELA - Chason Virgil - 19/34, 240 yards, 2 TD, INT
- HBU - Bailey Zappe - 29/46, 342 yards, 3 TD, 3 INT

Top rushers

- SELA - Darren Johnson - 21 carries, 127 yards, TD
- HBU - LaDarius Dickens - 16 carries, 97 yards, TD

Top receivers

- SELA - CJ Turner - 4 receptions, 92 yards, TD
- HBU - Jarreth Sterns - 9 receptions, 110 yards, 2 TD

=== Abilene Christian ===
Abilene Christian at Southeastern Louisiana – Game summary

Quarter	1	2	3	4	Total
Wildcats	3	17	7	21	48
Lions	0	10	7	10	27

at Strawberry Stadium, Hammond, LA

- Date: October 20
- Game time: 7:00 p.m. CST
- Game attendance: 4,724
- Referee: Kevin Hassell
- TV: Southeastern Channel/Southland Digital Channel

Game information

First quarter

- ACU - Oscar Hernandez 33-yard field goal, 3:07 (ACU 3-0)

Second quarter

- ACU - Tracy James 15-yard TD run, Hernandez kick good, 13:51 (ACU 10-0)
- SELA - Julius Maracalin 4-yard TD run, Jonathan Tatum kick good, 12:07 (ACU 10-7)
- ACU - Kalin Sadler 34-yard TD pass from Luke Anthony, Hernandez kick good, 9:48 (ACU 17-7)
- ACU - Hernandez 32-yard field goal, 1:59 (ACU 20-7)
- SELA - Tatum 33-yard field goal, 0:41 (ACU 20-10)

Third quarter

- ACU - Torin Justice 15-yard TD pass from Anthony, Hernandez kick good, 5:08 (ACU 27-10)
- SELA - Nih-Jer Jackson 9-yard TD pass from Chason Virgil, Tatum kick good, 2:40 (ACU 27-17)

Fourth quarter

- ACU - James 2-yard TD run, Hernandez kick good, 14:11 (ACU 34-17)
- SELA - Tatum 28-yard field goal, 11:37 (ACU 34-20)
- ACU - Billy McCrary 51-yard TD run, Hernandez kick good, 10:24 (ACU 41-20)
- SELA - Lorenzo Nunez 10-yard TD pass from Virgil, Tatum kick good, 7:41 (ACU 41-27)
- ACU - Justice 14-yard TD pass from Anthony, Hernandez kick good, 6:16 (ACU 48-27

Top passers

- ACU - Luke Anthony - 29/37, 295 yards, 3 TD
- SELA - Chason Virgil - 30/55, 324 yards, 2 TD, INT

Top rushers

- ACU - Billy McCrary - 14 carries, 222 yards, TD
- SELA - Darren Johnson - 8 carries, 68 yards

Top receivers

- ACU - Torin Justice - 6 receptions, 69 yards, 2 TD
- SELA - CJ Turner - 11 receptions, 107 yards

=== At Sam Houston State ===
Southeastern Louisiana at Sam Houston State – Game summary

Quarter	1	2	3	4	Total
Lions	0	10	0	15	25
No. 23 Bearkats	14	0	7	7	28

at Bowers Stadium, Huntsville, TX

- Date: October 27
- Game time: 1:00 p.m. CST
- Game weather: 76 °F (24 °C); clear and sunny
- Game attendance: 10,098
- Referee: Dan Lewis
- TV: Eleven Sports

Game information

First quarter

- SHSU - Dee Bowens 64-yard TD pass from Ty Brock, Tre Honshtein kick good, 13:44 (SHSU 7-0)
- SHSU - Kyran Jackson 2-yard TD run, Honshtein kick good, 5:33 (SHSU 14-0)

Second quarter

- SELA - Juwan Petit-Frere 16-yard TD pass from Chason Virgil, Jonathan Tatum kick good, 11:37 (SHSU 14-7)
- SELA - Tatum 17-yard field goal, 1:57 (SHSU 14-10)

Third quarter

- SHSU - Jackson 2-yard TD run, Hoshtein kick good, 10:10 (SHSU 21-10)

Fourth quarter

- SHSU - Jackson 11-yard TD run, Honshtein kick good, 13:18 (SHSU 28-10)
- SELA - Devonte Williams 1-yard TD run, Tatum kick good, 10:25 (SHSU 28-17)
- SELA - Virgil 1-yard TD run, Virgil two-point conversion pass to Bransen Schwebel good, 2:59 (SHSU 28-25)

Top passers

- SHSU - Ty Brock - 23/32, 320 yards, TD, INT
- SELA - Chason Virgil - 20/32, 274 yards, TD, 2 INT

Top rushers

- SHSU - Kyran Jackson - 19 carries, 114 yards, 3 TD
- SELA - Darren Johnson - 15 carries, 79 yards

Top receivers

- SHSU - Dee Bowens - 8 receptions, 155 yards, TD
- SELA - Nih-Jer Jackson - 5 receptions, 64 yards

=== McNeese State ===
McNeese State at Southeastern Louisiana – Game summary

Quarter	1	2	3	4	Total
No. 11 Cowboys	0	6	0	0	6
Lions	0	10	7	6	23

at Strawberry Stadium, Hammond, LA

- Date: November 3
- Game time: 2:30 p.m. CST
- Game weather: 73 °F (23 °C); sunny
- Game attendance: 5,127
- Referee: Steve Baron
- TV: CST

Game information

Second quarter

- SELA - Juwan Petit-Frere 6-yard TD pass from Chason Virgil, Jonathan Tatum kick good, 10:05 (SELA 7-0)
- MCNS - Gunnar Raborn 22-yard field goal, 7:18 (SELA 7-3)
- SELA - Tatum 40-yard field goal, 3:59 (SELA 10-3)
- MCNS - Raborn 37-yard field goal, 0:02 (SELA 10-6)

Third quarter

- SELA - Julius Maracalin 41-yard TD run, Tatum kick good, 1:10 (SELA 17-6)

Fourth quarter

- SELA - Tatum 25-yard field goal, 8:53 (SELA 20-6)
- SELA - Tatum 30-yard field goal, 5:29 (SELA 23-6)

Top passers

- SELA - Chason Virgil - 14/28, 162 yards, TD
- MCNS - Cody Orgeron - 13/23, 98 yards, INT

Top rushers

- SELA - Julius Maracalin - 13 carries, 88 yards, TD
- MCNS - Cody Orgeron - 6 carries, 32 yards

Top receivers

- SELA - Juwan Petit-Frere - 7 receptions, 85 yards, TD
- MCNS - Cyron Sutton - 6 receptions, 55 yards

=== At Nicholls ===
Southeastern Louisiana at Nicholls – Game summary

Quarter	1	2	3	4	Total
Lions	0	0	0	0	0
No. 18 Colonels	13	10	7	14	44

at Manning Field at John L. Guidry Stadium, Thibodaux, LA

- Date: November 15
- Game time: 6:00 p.m. CST
- Game weather: 48 °F (9 °C); clear
- Game attendance: 9,454
- Referee: Kevin Boitman
- TV: CST

Game information

First quarter

- NICH - Dontrell Taylor 14-yard TD run, Lorran Fonseca kick good, 13:58 (NICH 7-0)
- NICH - Julien Gums 2-yard TD run, Fonseca kick no good, 0:08 (NICH 13-0)

Second quarter

- NICH - Chase Fourcade 9-yard TD run, Fonseca kick good, 12:18 (NICH 20-0)
- NICH - Fonseca 23-yard field goal, 7:49 (NICH 23-0)

Third quarter

- NICH - Gabe Fuselier 10-yard TD pass from Fourcade, Fonseca kick good, 10:20 (NICH 30-0)

Fourth quarter

- NICH - Fourcade 1-yard TD run, Fonseca kick good, 14:55 (NICH 37-0)
- NICH - Gums 10-yard TD run, Fonseca kick good, 5:05 (NICH 44-0)

Top passers

- NICH - Chase Fourcade - 11/18, 128 yards, TD
- SELA - Chason Virgil - 16/31, 193 yards, INT

Top rushers

- NICH - Julien Gums - 14 carries, 121 yards, 2 TD
- SELA - Darren Johnson - 10 carries, 42 yards

Top receivers

- NICH - Dai'Jean Dixon - 4 receptions, 58 yards
- SELA - Bransen Schwebel - 3 receptions, 51 yards
