= 2018 Lamar Cardinals football team =

American college football season

2018 Lamar Cardinals football

NCAA Division I First Round, L 13–16 vs. Northern Iowa
- Conference: Southland Conference
- Record: 7–5 (6–3 Southland)
- Head coach: Mike Schultz (2nd season)
- Offensive coordinator: Dan Dodd (2nd season)
- Offensive scheme: Spread
- Co-defensive coordinators: Troy Douglas (2nd season); Cam Clark (1st season)
- Base defense: 4–3
- Home stadium: Provost Umphrey Stadium

2018 Southland Conference football standings
	Conf.			Overall
Team	W		L	W		L
No. 14 Nicholls +^	7	–	2	9	–	4
Incarnate Word +^	6	–	2	6	–	5
Lamar ^	6	–	3	7	–	5
Abilene Christian	5	–	4	6	–	5
Central Arkansas	5	–	4	6	–	5
McNeese State	5	–	4	6	–	5
Sam Houston State	5	–	4	6	–	5
Northwestern State	4	–	5	5	–	6
Southeastern Louisiana	4	–	5	4	–	7
Stephen F. Austin	2	–	7	2	–	8
Houston Baptist	0	–	9	1	–	10
+ – Conference co-champions; ^ – FCS playoff participant; Rankings from STATS poll

The 2018 Lamar Cardinals football team represented Lamar University in the 2018 NCAA Division I FCS football season. The Cardinals were led by second-year head coach Mike Schultz and played their home games at Provost Umphrey Stadium. They played as a member of the Southland Conference. They finished the season 7–5, 6–3 in Southland play to finish in third place. They received an at-large berth to the FCS Playoffs, where they lost in the first round to Northern Iowa.

== TV and radio media ==
All Lamar games will be broadcast on KLVI, also known as News Talk 560.

In fourth year of an agreement (third year for football) with ESPN, live video of all home games (except those picked up by Southland Conference TV agreements) will be streamed on ESPN3.

== Preseason ==
=== Preseason All-Conference Teams ===
On July 12, 2018, the Southland announced their Preseason All-Conference Teams, with the Cardinals placing one player on the second team.

Defense Second Team
- Zae Giles – Jr. PR

=== Preseason poll ===
On July 19, 2018, the Southland announced their preseason poll, with the Cardinals predicted to finish in tenth place.

== Schedule ==
Date	Time	Opponent	Site	TV	Result	Attendance
September 1	6:00 p.m.	Kentucky Christian*	Provost Umphrey Stadium; Beaumont, TX	ESPN3	W 70–7	7,056
September 8	3:00 p.m.	at Texas Tech*	Jones AT&T Stadium; Lubbock, TX	FSN	L 0–77	52,126
September 15	6:00 p.m.	Northwestern State	Provost Umphrey Stadium; Beaumont, TX	ESPN+	L 48–49	6,021
September 22	6:00 p.m.	Southeastern Louisiana^{†}	Provost Umphrey Stadium; Beaumont, TX	ESPN3	L 24–30	8,017
September 29	2:30 p.m.	at No. 15 Nicholls State	John L. Guidry Stadium; Thibodaux, LA	ELVN/CST/SLC Digital	L 27–50	8,044
October 13	3:00 p.m.	Incarnate Word	Provost Umphrey Stadium; Beaumont, TX	ESPN+/MYTX	W 27–21	6,113
October 20	3:00 p.m.	No. 14 Sam Houston State	Provost Umphrey Stadium; Beaumont, TX	ESPN+/MYTX	W 41–23	7,227
October 27	3:00 p.m.	at Stephen F. Austin	Homer Bryce Stadium; Nacogdoches, TX	ESPN+	W 24–17	6,321
November 3	6:00 p.m.	at No. 19 Central Arkansas	Estes Stadium; Conway, AR	ELVN/CST/SLC Digital	W 38–24	10,874
November 10	3:00 p.m.	Houston Baptist	Provost Umphrey Stadium; Beaumont, TX	ESPN+/MYTX	W 38–9	8,028
November 17	3:00 p.m.	at No. 22 McNeese State	Cowboy Stadium; Lake Charles, LA (Battle of the Border)	ESPN3	W 21–17	11,532
November 24	4:00 p.m.	at Northern Iowa*	UNI-Dome; Cedar Rapids, IA (NCAA Division I First Round)	ESPN3	L 13–16	4,082
*Non-conference game; ^{†}Homecoming; Rankings from STATS Poll released prior to the game; All times are in Central time

== Game summaries ==
=== Kentucky Christian ===
Kentucky Christian at Lamar

Team	1	2	3	4	Total
Knights	0	0	0	7	7
• Cardinals	21	28	7	14	70

- Date: September 1
- Location: Provost Umphrey Stadium
  Beaumont, TX
- Game start: 6:00 p.m. CDT
- Elapsed time: 3:21
- Game attendance: 7,056
- Game weather: Overcast, 25% rain Temp: 85 Wind: E 6mph
- Referee: Ed Bourgeouis
- TV announcers (ESPN3): Dan Gresham, play by play; Lemont Williams, analyst

=== At Texas Tech ===
Lamar at Texas Tech

Team	1	2	3	4	Total
Cardinals	0	0	0	0	0
• Red Raiders	14	28	14	21	77

- Date: September 8
- Location: Jones AT&T Stadium
  Lubbock, TX
- Game start: 3:05 pm CDT
- Elapsed time: : 3:39
- Game attendance: 52,126
- Game weather: Cloudy Temp: 77 Wind: NNE 10mph
- Referee: Eddy Shelton
- TV announcers (FSN): Brendan Burke, play by play; David Anderson, analyst; Christian Steckel, reporter

=== Northwestern State ===
Northwestern State at Lamar

Team	1	2	3	4	Total
• Demons	14	14	7	14	49
Cardinals	0	14	14	20	48

- Date: September 15
- Location: Provost Umphrey Stadium
  Beaumont, TX
- Game start: 6:00 pm CDT
- Elapsed time: 4:13
- Game attendance:
- Game weather: Scattered T-storms Temp: 87 Wind: SSW 5mph
- Referee: Dan Lewis
- TV announcers (ESPN+): Butch Alsandor, play by play; Lemont Williams, analyst

=== Southeastern Louisiana ===
Southeastern Louisiana at Lamar

Team	1	2	3	4	Total
• Lions	7	3	7	13	30
Cardinals	6	11	0	7	24

- Date: September 22
- Location: Provost Umphrey Stadium
  Beaumont, TX
- Game start: 6:00 pm CDT
- Elapsed time: 3:37
- Game attendance: 8,017
- Game weather: Cloudy and rainy Temp: 80 Wind: S 6mph
- Referee: Vidal Jones
- TV announcers (ESPN3): Sam Levitt, play by play; Lemont Williams, analyst

=== At Nicholls State ===
Lamar at Nicholls

Team	1	2	3	4	Total
Cardinals	10	7	3	7	27
• No. 15 Colonels	13	14	14	9	50

- Date: September 29
- Location: John L. Guidry Stadium
  Thibodaux, LA
- Game start: 2:30 p.m. CDT
- Elapsed time: 3:02
- Game attendance: 8,044
- Game weather: Cloudy, rainy Temp: 82 Wind: ENE 5mph
- Referee: Dan Lewis
- TV announcers (ELVN/CST/SLC Digital): David Salzman, play by play; Butch Alsandor, analyst

=== Incarnate Word ===
Incarnate Word at Lamar

Team	1	2	3	4	Total
Cardinals (UIW)	7	0	7	7	21
• Cardinals (LU)	0	7	7	13	27

- Date: October 13
- Location: Provost Umphrey Stadium
  Beaumont, TX
- Game start: 3:00 pm CDT
- Elapsed time: 3:35
- Game attendance: 6,113
- Game weather: Mostly cloudy Temp: 87 Wind: S 10mph
- Referee: C. Watson
- Television network: ESPN+/MYTX

=== Sam Houston State ===
Sam Houston State at Lamar

Team	1	2	3	4	Total
No. 14 Bearkats	13	0	10	0	23
• Cardinals	10	7	17	7	41

- Date: October 20
- Location: Provost Umphrey Stadium
  Beaumont, TX
- Game start: 3:00 pm CDT
- Elapsed time: 3:14
- Game attendance: 7,227
- Game weather: Overcast Temp: 74 Wind: S 9mph
- Referee: Ed Bourgeois
- Television network: ESPN+/MYTX

=== At Stephen F. Austin ===
Lamar at Stephen F. Austin

Team	1	2	3	4	Total
• Cardinals	7	10	7	0	24
Lumberjacks	0	0	7	10	17

- Date: October 27
- Location: Homer Bryce Stadium
  Nacogdoches, TX
- Game start: 3:00 pm CDT
- Elapsed time: 3:15
- Game attendance: 6,321
- Game weather: Clear Temp: 79 Wind: WSW 5mph
- Referee: Vidal Jones
- TV announcers (ESPN+): Rob Meyers, play by play; Kevin Langford, analyst

=== At Central Arkansas ===
Lamar at Central Arkansas

Team	1	2	3	4	Total
• Cardinals	21	14	3	0	38
No. 19 Bears	10	6	0	8	24

- Date: November 3
- Location: Estes Stadium
  Conway, AR
- Game start: 6:00 pm CDT
- Elapsed time: 3:23
- Game attendance: 10,874
- Referee: Dan Lewis
- Television network: ELVN/CST/SLC Digital

=== Houston Baptist ===
Houston Baptist at Lamar

Team	1	2	3	4	Total
Huskies	0	9	0	0	9
• Cardinals	14	7	7	10	38

- Date: November 10
- Location: Provost Umphrey Stadium
  Beaumont, TX
- Game start: 3:00 pm CST
- Elapsed time: 3:05
- Game attendance: 8,028
- Game weather: Cloudy Temp: 55
- Referee: C. Watson
- Television network: ESPN+/MYTX

=== At McNeese State ===
Lamar at McNeese

Team	1	2	3	4	Total
• Cardinals	7	0	7	7	21
No. 22 Cowboys	0	3	6	8	17

- Date: November 17
- Location: Cowboy Stadium
  Lake Charles, LA
- Game start: 3:00 p.m. CST
- Elapsed time: 3:10
- Game attendance: 11,532
- Game weather: Partly Cloudy Temp: 70 Wind: ESE 6mph
- Referee: C. Watson
- TV announcers (ESPN3): Lyn Rollins, play by play; Rene Nadeau, analyst; Carley McCord, reporter

== FCS Playoffs ==
=== At Northern Iowa–First Round ===
Lamar at Northern Iowa

Team	1	2	3	4	Total
Cardinals	13	0	0	0	13
• Panthers	3	10	0	3	16

- Date: November 24
- Location: UNI-Dome
  Cedar Rapids, IA
- Game start: 4:00 p.m. CST
- Elapsed time: :
- Game attendance: 4,082
- Television network: ESPN3

== Personnel ==
=== Roster ===
2018 Lamar Cardinals football team roster
Players
Coaches
Offense

Pos.	#	Name	Class
WR	1	Jawun Ruffin	Jr
RB	2	James Jones	Fr
QB	3	Jack Dallas	Fr
WR	4	Dewan Thompson, Jr.	Sr
RB	5	Derrion Randle	Jr
QB	7	Darrell Colbert, Jr	Sr
QB	8	Jordan Hoy	Jr
WR	9	Kendrick King	Jr
WR	11	Zae Giles	Jr
QB	12	Marcellus Johnson	Fr
WR	14	Caisen Sullivan	So
QB	15	Shane Johnson	Jr
QB	17	Adam Morse	So
WR	19	Dorian Gaston	Sr
RB	22	Myles Wanza	So
WR	23	Kirkland Banks	So
WR	24	Tanner Douglas	Fr
RB	27	A.J. Walker	Jr
WR	29	Taylor Givens	Jr
RB	39	Cole Starnes	Jr
WR	41	Deonte Bradford	Fr
OL	51	Stephon Cooper	Jr
OL	54	Bless Harris	Fr
OL	58	Chaise Bridgeman	So
OL	62	John Ryder Moorman	Fr
OL	64	Humberto Lopez	Fr
OL	66	Jesse Brewster	So
OL	70	Colton Peterson	So
OL	71	Jason Hessler	Jr
OL	72	Tamatoa Neher	Jr
OL	74	Micah McComb	Fr
OL	75	Corey Nance	Jr
OL	76	Garrett Bowery	Jr
OL	77	Hayden Kaaiohelo	Jr
OL	78	Julio Cuello	Fr
OL	79	Aires Gilmore-Gardner	Jr
WR	80	Blake Robinson	Fr
WR	81	Erik Pizarro	Fr
TE	82	Mason Sikes	So
WR	86	Garrison Spring	Jr
TE	87	Cameron Sir Lewis	Fr
WR	88	Martell Hawthorne	Sr
TE	89	Case Robinson	Jr

Defense

Pos.	#	Name	Class
DB	1	Stanley Norman	Jr
DT	2	Darien Wilson	Jr
DB	3	Garrison Mitchell	Jr
DB	4	Steven Jones	Fr
DB	6	Willie Sykes	Jr
DB	7	Brandon Dabney	Sr
LB	8	Desmond Veals	So
DB	10	Davon Jernigan	Sr
LB	11	Chaston Brooks	Sr
DB	12	Tyler Rios	Sr
DB	13	Caleb Abrom	Jr
LB	15	Mark Meynisse	Jr
LB	16	Isaiah Spencer	Jr
LB	17	Josh Jinning	So
DB	18	Andre Mulinax	So
DB	20	Rodney Randle, Jr.	Sr
DB	21	Lane Taylor	Sr
DB	25	Michale Fox	Fr
DB	26	Tariq Gordan	Jr
DB	28	Darius Guillory	So
DE	30	Dedrick Garner	Sr
DB	31	JaRod Bedford	Fr
DB	33	Casden Brooks	Fr
LB	34	Abel Daley	Fr
LB	35	Keshawn Mayers	Fr
LB	36	Cameron Minger	Jr
DB	38	Dominique Morris	Fr
DB	40	Milton Holmes	Jr
DE	42	Reggie Boseman	So
DT	43	James Jeffrey	Jr
LB	44	Titus Hunt	Jr
DB	47	Camron Davis	Fr
DB	48	Kevin O'Neill	Jr
LB	49	David Crosley	So
LB	52	Caleb Oden	Fr
LB	53	Kyle Krutchen	So
LB	55	Luke Wallis	Fr
LB	56	John Garza	Fr
Jr	90	Daniel Crosley	Jr
DL	91	Ezekiel Olavarrietta	Fr
DE	92	Anthony Palmer	Fr
DL	93	Trajan Williams	Fr
DE	94	Cameron Houston	So
DL	97	Hunter Adams	Fr
DL	98	Tron Rideaux	Fr
DE	99	Brandon Arnold	So

Special teams

Pos.	#	Name	Class
K	31	Elvin Martinez	So
K/P	32	Enrique Carmona	Fr
K/P	45	Keyonne Hawkins	Fr
P	46	Tyler Slaydon	Jr
DS	50	Christian Langston	So

Head coach

- Mike Schultz

Coordinators/assistant coaches

- Dan Dodd – Offensive Coordinator/QBs
- Troy Douglas – Co–Defensive Coordinator/CBs
- Todd Ivicic – Special Teams Coordinator/DL
- Cam Clark – Co-Defensive Coordinator/Linebackers
- Eric Buchanen – Safeties
- Bill Bleil – Offensive Line
- Bobby Dodd – Tight Ends
- Adrian Madise – Wide Receivers
- Carson Earp – Quality Control Coach (Offense)
- Jordan Hopkins – Quality Control Coach (Defense)
- Chad Reininiger – Quality Control Coach (Special Teams)
- Cameron DeBesse – Quality Control Coach (Offense)
- Matt Oubre – Quality Control Coach (Offense)

Legend

- (C) Team captain
- (S) Suspended
- (I) Ineligible
- Injured
- Redshirt

=== Depth chart ===
Defense

FS
21 Lane Taylor (Sr)
10 Davon Jernigan (Sr)

SAM	MIKE	$
16 Isaiah Spencer (Jr)	11 Chaston Brooks (Sr)	7 Brandon Dabney (Sr)
33 Jerick Pitre, So	8 Desmond Veals (So)	3 Garrison Mitchell (Jr)

WS
6 Willie Sykes (Jr)
28 Darius Guillory (So)

CB
12 Tyler Rios (Sr)
4 Steven Jones (Fr)

DE	DT	DT	DE
90 Daniel Crosley (Jr)	42 Reggie Boseman (So)	43 James Jeffrey (Jr)	30 Dedrick Garner (Sr)
94 Cameron Houston (So)	99 Brandon Arnold (So)	2 Darien Wilson (Jr)	34 Abel Daily (Fr)

CB
20 Rodney Randle (Sr)
1 Stanley Norman (Jr)

Offense

L
11 Zale Giles (Jr)
19 Dorian Gaston (Sr)

A
23 Kirkland Banks (So)
4 Dewan Thompson, Jr. (Sr)

LT	LG	C	RG	RT
77 Hayden Kaaiohelo (Jr)	70 Colton Peterson (So)	51 Stephon Cooper (Jr)	76 Garrett Bowery (Sr)	75 Corey Nance (So)
64 Humberto Lopez (Fr)	72 Tamatoa Neher (Jr)	66 Jesse Brewster (So)	74 Micah McComb (Fr)	79 Aires Gilmore-Gardner (Jr)

R
84 Isaiah Howard (Sr)
29 Taylor Givens (Jr)

Y
89 Case Robinson (Jr)
82 Mason Sikes (So)

QB
7 Darrel Colbert (Sr)
8 Jordan Hoy (Jr)

RB
22 Myles Wanza (So)
5 Derrion Randle (Jr)

Special teams
PK 31 Elvin Martinez (So)
PK 32 Enrique Carmona (Fr)
P 46 Tyler Slaydon (Jr)
P 32 Enrique Carmona (Fr)
KR 20 Rodney Randle (Sr)
PR 23 Kirkland Banks (So)
LS 50 Christian Langston (So)
H 3 Jack Dallas (Fr)

=== Coaching staff ===
Name	Position	Season at Lamar
Mike Schultz	Head coach	2nd
Dan Dodd	Offensive coordinator and Quarterbacks coach	2nd
Troy Douglas	Co-Defensive coordinator and Cornerbacks coach	2nd
Todd Ivicic	Special Teams and Defensive line coach	2nd
Cam Clark	Co-Defensive coordinator and Linebackers coach	2nd
Eric Buchanan	Safeties coach	2nd
Bill Bleil	Offensive line coach	1st
Bobby Dodd	Tight ends coach	2nd
Adrian Madise	Wide receivers coach	1st
Bret Grant	Quality Control coach - Defense/Football Operations	1st
Carson Earp	Quality Control coach - Offense	1st
Jordan Hopkins	Quality Control Coach - Defense	1st
Chad Reiniger	Quality Control Coach - Special Teams	1st
Matt Oubre	Quality Control Coach - Offense	1st
Craig McGallion	Director of Operations	1st
Daniel Darcy	Strength and Conditioning coordinator	3rd

== Honors and awards ==
=== All Conference Honors ===
- Co–Newcomer of the Year: Jordan Hoy
- Offensive Lineman of the Year: Garrett Bowery
- First Team All–Conference Offense: Garrett Bowery
- First Team All–Conference Defense: Davon Jernigan
- Second Team All–Conference Defense: Daniel Crosley

=== Player of the Week ===
- Caleb Abrom – October 13 – Southland Conference Special Teams Player of the Week – Returned blocked field goal for game winning touchdown against Incarnate Word.
- Tyler Slayton – October 20 – Southland Conference Special Teams Player of the Week – Averaged 45 yards on 6 punts in upset of No. 14 Sam Houston State.
- Jordan Hoy – October 27 – Southland Conference Offensive Player of the Week – In first Lamar start, Hoy for 225 yards, program best for a quarterback and 7th best overall for the program in win against Stephen F. Austin.
- Jordan Hoy – November 3 – Southland Conference Offensive Player of the Week – Guided Lamar offense to five touchdowns and 512 yards offense in win over No. 19 Central Arkansas. The win was the first over Central Arkansas in program history.
- Darrel Colbert, Jr. – November 19 – Southland Conference Offensive Player of the Week – Colbert guided the Cardinals to their third win over a nationally ranked team this season with their come-from-behind victory on the road against McNeese.

== Ranking movements ==
Ranking movements Legend: ██ Increase in ranking ██ Decrease in ranking — = Not ranked RV = Received votes
	Week													
Poll	Pre	1	2	3	4	5	6	7	8	9	10	11	12	Final
STATS FCS	—	—	—	—	—	—	—	—	—	RV	RV	RV	RV	RV
Coaches	—	—	—	—	—	—	—	—	—	—	—	—	RV	RV
