= 2018 Abilene Christian Wildcats football team =

American college football season

2018 Abilene Christian Wildcats football
- Conference: Southland Conference
- Record: 6–5 (5–4 Southland)
- Head coach: Adam Dorrel (2nd season)
- Offensive coordinator: Josh Lamberson (2nd season)
- Offensive scheme: Single set back
- Defensive coordinator: Tremaine Jackson (2nd season)
- Base defense: 3–4
- Home stadium: Anthony Field at Wildcat Stadium

2018 Southland Conference football standings
| | Conf. | | | Overall |
| Team | W | | L | W | | L |
|---|---|---|---|---|---|---|
| No. 14 Nicholls +^ | 7 | – | 2 | 9 | – | 4 |
| Incarnate Word +^ | 6 | – | 2 | 6 | – | 5 |
| Lamar ^ | 6 | – | 3 | 7 | – | 5 |
| Abilene Christian | 5 | – | 4 | 6 | – | 5 |
| Central Arkansas | 5 | – | 4 | 6 | – | 5 |
| McNeese State | 5 | – | 4 | 6 | – | 5 |
| Sam Houston State | 5 | – | 4 | 6 | – | 5 |
| Northwestern State | 4 | – | 5 | 5 | – | 6 |
| Southeastern Louisiana | 4 | – | 5 | 4 | – | 7 |
| Stephen F. Austin | 2 | – | 7 | 2 | – | 8 |
| Houston Baptist | 0 | – | 9 | 1 | – | 10 |
+ – Conference co-champions; ^ – FCS playoff participant; Rankings from STATS poll

The 2018 Abilene Christian Wildcats football team represented Abilene Christian University in the 2018 NCAA Division I FCS football season. The Wildcats were led by second-year head coach Adam Dorrel and played their home games at Anthony Field at Wildcat Stadium. They played as a member of the Southland Conference. They finished the season 6–5, 5–4 in Southland play to finish in a four-way tie for fourth place.

== Preseason ==
=== Preseason All-Conference Teams ===
On July 12, 2018, the Southland announced their Preseason All-Conference Teams, with the Wildcats placing one player on the second team.

Defense Second Team
- Bolu Onifade – So. DB

=== Preseason poll ===
On July 19, 2018, the Southland announced their preseason poll, with the Wildcats predicted to finish in seventh place.

== Schedule ==
| Date | Time | Opponent | Site | TV | Result | Attendance |
|---|---|---|---|---|---|---|
| September 1 | 7:00 p.m. | at Baylor* | McLane Stadium; Waco, TX | FSN | L 27–55 | 45,330 |
| September 8 | 6:00 p.m. | Angelo State* | Wildcat Stadium; Abilene, TX | ACU Stretch ($) | W 41–24 | 9,287 |
| September 15 | 6:00 p.m. | at Houston Baptist | Husky Stadium; Houston, TX | ESPN3 | W 38–13 | 2,038 |
| September 22 | 6:00 p.m. | at Stephen F. Austin | Homer Bryce Stadium; Nacogdoches, TX | ESPN+ | L 21–24 | 6,281 |
| September 29 | 6:00 p.m. | Incarnate Word | Wildcat Stadium; Abilene, TX | ESPN+ | L 34–44 | 9,751 |
| October 6 | 6:00 p.m. | at No. 9 McNeese State | Cowboy Stadium; Lake Charles, LA | Cowboy Insider | L 21–24 | 10,001 |
| October 13 | 2:30 p.m. | No. 11 Nicholls^{†} | Wildcat Stadium; Abilene, TX | ESPN3 | W 28–12 | 10,973 |
| October 20 | 7:00 p.m. | at Southeastern Louisiana | Strawberry Stadium; Hammond, LA | SLC Digital | W 48–27 | 4,724 |
| November 3 | 2:00 pm | Northwestern State | Wildcat Stadium; Abilene, TX | ACU Stretch | W 49–47 | 6,936 |
| November 10 | 2:30 pm | at Sam Houston State | Bowers Stadium; Huntsville, TX | ELVN/SLC Digital | W 17–10 | 6,914 |
| November 17 | 2:00 pm | Central Arkansas | Wildcat Stadium; Abilene, TX | ESPN+ | L 7–16 | 8,006 |
*Non-conference game; ^{†}Homecoming; Rankings from STATS Poll released prior to the game; All times are in Central time

== Game summaries ==
=== At Baylor ===
| | 1 | 2 | 3 | 4 | Total |
|---|---|---|---|---|---|
| Wildcats | 7 | 13 | 7 | 0 | 27 |
| Bears | 17 | 21 | 10 | 7 | 55 |

=== At Houston Baptist ===
| | 1 | 2 | 3 | 4 | Total |
|---|---|---|---|---|---|
| Wildcats | 7 | 7 | 17 | 7 | 38 |
| Huskies | 6 | 0 | 0 | 7 | 13 |

=== At Stephen F. Austin ===
| | 1 | 2 | 3 | 4 | Total |
|---|---|---|---|---|---|
| Wildcats | 0 | 7 | 7 | 7 | 21 |
| Lumberjacks | 3 | 7 | 7 | 7 | 24 |

=== Incarnate Word ===
| | 1 | 2 | 3 | 4 | Total |
|---|---|---|---|---|---|
| Cardinals | 14 | 13 | 10 | 7 | 44 |
| Wildcats | 14 | 14 | 0 | 6 | 34 |

=== At McNeese State ===
| | 1 | 2 | 3 | 4 | Total |
|---|---|---|---|---|---|
| Wildcats | 7 | 7 | 0 | 7 | 21 |
| No. 9 Cowboys | 7 | 3 | 7 | 7 | 24 |

=== Nicholls ===
| | 1 | 2 | 3 | 4 | Total |
|---|---|---|---|---|---|
| No. 11 Colonels | 6 | 6 | 0 | 0 | 12 |
| Wildcats | 7 | 14 | 0 | 7 | 28 |

=== At Southeastern Louisiana ===
| | 1 | 2 | 3 | 4 | Total |
|---|---|---|---|---|---|
| Wildcats | 3 | 17 | 7 | 21 | 48 |
| Lions | 0 | 10 | 7 | 10 | 27 |

=== Northwestern State ===
| | 1 | 2 | 3 | 4 | Total |
|---|---|---|---|---|---|
| Demons | 7 | 7 | 14 | 19 | 47 |
| Wildcats | 14 | 10 | 17 | 8 | 49 |

=== At Sam Houston State ===
| | 1 | 2 | 3 | 4 | Total |
|---|---|---|---|---|---|
| Wildcats | 7 | 0 | 7 | 3 | 17 |
| Bearkats | 0 | 3 | 7 | 0 | 10 |

=== Central Arkansas ===
| | 1 | 2 | 3 | 4 | Total |
|---|---|---|---|---|---|
| Bears | 0 | 6 | 3 | 7 | 16 |
| Wildcats | 0 | 7 | 0 | 0 | 7 |
