= Frank Scelfo =

American football coach (born 1959)

Current position
- Title: Head coach
- Team: Southeastern Louisiana
- Conference: Southland
- Record: 53–40

Biographical details
- Born: February 9, 1959 (age 67); Abbeville, Louisiana, U.S.

Playing career

Baseball
- 1977–1981: Northeast Louisiana

Coaching career (HC unless noted)

Football
- 1982–1983: Prairie View Academy (LA)
- 1984: Jesuit HS (LA) (DB)
- 1985–1986: River Oaks School (LA)
- 1987: Vidor HS (TX) (DB)
- 1988: Orangefield HS (TX) (OC/QB)
- 1989–1991: Chapel Hill HS (TX) (OC/QB)
- 1992–1994: Kilgore HS (TX) (OC/QB/WR)
- 1995: North Shore HS (TX) (DB)
- 1996–1998: Tulane (TE/RC)
- 1999–2006: Tulane (OC/QB)
- 2007–2009: Louisiana Tech (OC/QB)
- 2010–2011: Arizona (QB)
- 2013–2014: Jacksonville Jaguars (QB)
- 2015: Jacksonville Jaguars (sr. off. asst.)
- 2016–2017: UTSA (OC/QB)
- 2018–present: Southeastern Louisiana

Head coaching record
- Overall: 53–40 (college)
- Tournaments: 3–4 (FCS Playoffs)

Accomplishments and honors

Championships
- Southland (2022)

Frank Jude Scelfo (born February 9, 1959) is an American football coach who currently is the head coach at Southeastern Louisiana University. Scelfo was the offensive coordinator for the UTSA Roadrunners football team of the University of Texas at San Antonio (UTSA) from 2016 to 2017. Scelfo has also served as the quarterbacks coach for the Jacksonville Jaguars of the National Football League (NFL). He played college baseball at Northeast Louisiana.

== Coaching career ==
=== High school ===
Scelfo started his coaching career coaching high school football in 1982. He coached mostly on offense, but did coach on defense a couple times. He coached in many different high schools in Louisiana and Texas.

=== College ===
Scelfo started coaching in college at Tulane University in 1996. He started out coaching tight ends before moving to quarterbacks and being an offensive coordinator. He coached four quarterbacks that played in the NFL. Those quarterbacks were Shaun King, Patrick Ramsey, J. P. Losman, and Lester Ricard.

Scelfo later coached at Louisiana Tech University, and the University of Arizona, where he coached Nick Foles and Matt Scott.

He was let go after two seasons at Arizona and he took a break from coaching in 2012.

=== Jacksonville Jaguars ===
Scelfo signed with the Jacksonville Jaguars following the 2012 NFL season, becoming the team's quarterbacks coach on January 23, 2013.

On January 28, 2015, it was reported Nathaniel Hackett would be the new quarterbacks coach for the Jacksonville Jaguars but Scelfo would remain on the staff. On February 5, 2015, it was reported Scelfo would be a senior offensive assistant.

== Personal life ==
Scelfo is married to Holly Kingery and the couple has two sons, Anthony and Jordan. Anthony played quarterback and baseball at Tulane and was selected by the Tampa Bay Rays in the 2008 Major League Baseball draft, while Jordan played quarterback and baseball at the University of the Incarnate Word from 2012 to 2015. His brother, Chris Scelfo, serves as the offensive line coach for the Houston Cougars.

== Head coaching record ==
=== College ===
Year	Team	Overall	Conference	Standing	Bowl/playoffs	Coaches^{#}	STATS^{°}
Southeastern Louisiana Lions (Southland Conference) (2018–present)
2018	Southeastern Louisiana	4–7	4–5	T–8th			
2019	Southeastern Louisiana	8–5	6–3	T–3rd	L NCAA Division I Second Round	18	19
2020–21	Southeastern Louisiana	4–3	4–2	2nd		21	20
2021	Southeastern Louisiana	9–4	6–2	2nd	L NCAA Division I Second Round	15	15
2022	Southeastern Louisiana	9–4	5–1	T–1st	L NCAA Division I Second Round	19	12
2023	Southeastern Louisiana	3–8	3–4	5th			
2024	Southeastern Louisiana	7–5	6–1	2nd			
2025	Southeastern Louisiana	9–4	7–1	2nd	L NCAA Division I First Round	19	19
Southeastern Louisiana:		53–40	41–19				
Total:		53–40					
National championship Conference title Conference division title or championship game berth
