= YurView =

Group of cable television channels

- Country: United States
- Broadcast area: regional

Programming
- Language: English

Ownership
- Owner: Charter Communications

History
- Launched: February 2017

Links
- Website: yurview.com

YurView is a group of cable television networks featuring both national and local lifestyle and sports programming. The group of networks are owned by Charter Communications through its acquisition of Cox Communications in August 2026, and are available exclusively on cable systems previously owned by Cox.

== History ==
Beginning in February 2017, Cox began to rebrand their various local origination as YurView. The networks continued to broadcast local high school and college sports, as well as other non-sports programming of local interest. New national programming was also added. Two of the first new shows launched were Dash to the Desert, a show offering analysis of the NCAA tournament and Tech Trends, a show featuring highlights from the Consumer Electronics Show.

== Networks ==
Network	Region served	Formerly operated as	Notes
YurView Arizona	Phoenix; Tucson	Arizona Sports Programming Network (1981–1996); Cox Sports (1996–1998); Cox 9 (1998–2004); Cox 7 (2004–2017)	Former regional sports network featuring the Phoenix Suns until 2003. Since 2023, YurView carries MLB Local Media-produced Arizona Diamondbacks broadcasts.
YurView Arkansas	Northwest Arkansas		Carries Kansas City Royals games produced by MLB Local Media
YurView California	San Diego; Los Angeles; Santa Barbara; Yuma/El Centro; Palm Springs	KCOX (early 80s-1997); 4 San Diego/4SD (1997–2017)	Carries sports programming from San Diego State University and the San Diego Padres. Formerly 4SD, a regional sports network.
YurView Florida	Mobile, Alabama; Gainesville; Pensacola; Fort Walton Beach; Macon, Georgia		Features live sports programming from the University of West Florida.
YurView Kansas	Kansas	Cox 22	Features live sports programming from the Wichita State University.
YurView Las Vegas	Las Vegas	Cox 96 (2004-2017)	Carries San Diego Padres games produced by MLB Local Media Also broadcasts live sports programming from University of Nevada, Las Vegas.
YurView Louisiana	New Orleans; Baton Rouge; Lafayette	Cox 4 (2001-2017)	
YurView New England	Hartford, Connecticut; Providence, Rhode Island		Carries sporting events from Bryant University and the University of Rhode Island. Previously carried games from Providence College.
YurView Oklahoma	Oklahoma City; Tulsa	The Cox Channel (2004–2017)	Carries St. Louis Cardinals games
YurView Omaha	Omaha, Nebraska		Carries live sports programming from University of Nebraska Omaha.
YurView Virginia	Hampton Roads; Northern Virginia; Roanoke	WCOX	

YurView is also offered to Spectrum subscribers on the Cleveland, Ohio system previously owned by Cox and in Sun Valley, Idaho, but it is unclear whether these areas carry local programming.
