= 2018 Houston Baptist Huskies football team =

American college football season

2018 Houston Baptist Huskies football
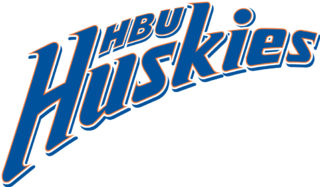
- Conference: Southland Conference
- Record: 1–10 (0–9 Southland)
- Head coach: Vic Shealy (6th season)
- Offensive coordinator: Zach Kittley (1st season)
- Offensive scheme: Air raid
- Co-defensive coordinators: Roger Hinshaw (6th season); Jeff Mills (1st season)
- Base defense: 3–4 or 4–3
- Home stadium: Husky Stadium

2018 Southland Conference football standings
	Conf.			Overall
Team	W		L	W		L
No. 14 Nicholls +^	7	–	2	9	–	4
Incarnate Word +^	6	–	2	6	–	5
Lamar ^	6	–	3	7	–	5
Abilene Christian	5	–	4	6	–	5
Central Arkansas	5	–	4	6	–	5
McNeese State	5	–	4	6	–	5
Sam Houston State	5	–	4	6	–	5
Northwestern State	4	–	5	5	–	6
Southeastern Louisiana	4	–	5	4	–	7
Stephen F. Austin	2	–	7	2	–	8
Houston Baptist	0	–	9	1	–	10
+ – Conference co-champions; ^ – FCS playoff participant; Rankings from STATS poll

The 2018 Houston Baptist Huskies football team represented Houston Baptist University—now known as Houston Christian University—as a member of the Southland Conference during the 2018 NCAA Division I FCS football season. Led by sixth-year head coach Vic Shealy the Huskies compiled an overall record of 1–10 with a mark of 0–9 in conference play, placing last out of 11 teams in the Southland. Houston Baptist played home games at Husky Stadium in Houston.

== Preseason ==
=== Preseason All-Conference Teams ===
On July 12, 2018, the Southland announced their Preseason All-Conference Teams, with the Huskies placing one player on the first team.

Defense First Team
- Raphael Lewis – Sr. DB

=== Preseason Poll ===
On July 19, 2018, the Southland announced their preseason poll, with the Huskies predicted to finish in last place.

Predicted finish	Team	Votes (1st place)
1	Sam Houston State	187 (10)
2	Nicholls State	173 (6)
3	Central Arkansas	170 (5)
4	McNeese State	159 (1)
5	Southeastern Louisiana	119
6	Stephen F. Austin	90
7	Abilene Christian	89
8	Northwestern State	86
9	Incarnate Word	53
10	Lamar	52
11	Houston Baptist	32

== Schedule ==
Date	Time	Opponent	Site	TV	Result	Attendance
September 1	6:00 p.m.	Southwest Baptist*	Husky Stadium; Houston, TX	SLC Digital	W 49–7	2,113
September 8	6:00 p.m.	No. 16 McNeese State	Husky Stadium; Houston, TX	Eleven Sports	L 34–51	2,538
September 15	6:00 p.m.	Abilene Christian	Husky Stadium; Houston, TX	ESPN3	L 13–38	2,038
September 29	6:00 p.m.	at SMU*	Gerald J. Ford Stadium; Dallas, TX	ESPN3	L 27–63	18,983
October 6	6:00 p.m.	at No. 20 Central Arkansas	Estes Stadium; Conway, AR	Bear Nation Network	L 35–66	10,210
October 13	4:00 p.m.	at Southeastern Louisiana	Strawberry Stadium; Hammond, LA	SLC Digital	L 52–62	6,023
October 20	6:00 p.m.	Stephen F. Austin^{†}	Husky Stadium; Houston, TX	ESPN3	L 14–42	2,687
October 27	6:00 p.m.	at Northwestern State	Harry Turpin Stadium; Natchitoches, LA	DemonTV	L 28–31	7,098
November 3	2:00 p.m.	No. 20 Nicholls State	Husky Stadium; Houston, TX	SLC Digital	L 20–41	1,926
November 10	3:00 p.m.	at Lamar	Provost Umphrey Stadium; Beaumont, TX	ESPN+	L 9–38	8,028
November 17	2:00 p.m.	Sam Houston State	Husky Stadium; Houston, TX	SLC Digital	L 20–42	2,002
*Non-conference game; ^{†}Homecoming; Rankings from STATS Poll released prior to the game; All times are in Central time

* Games were televised on tape delay.

== Game summaries ==
=== Southwest Baptist ===
	1	2	3	4	Total
Bearcats	0	0	0	7	7
Huskies	7	21	14	7	49

=== At SMU ===
	1	2	3	4	Total
Huskies	3	7	10	7	27
Mustangs	21	14	14	14	63

=== At Central Arkansas ===
	1	2	3	4	Total
Huskies	14	7	14	0	35
No. 20 Bears	21	14	17	14	66

=== At Southeastern Louisiana ===
	1	2	3	4	Total
Huskies	0	23	14	15	52
Lions	21	14	7	20	62

=== Stephen F. Austin ===
	1	2	3	4	Total
Lumberjacks	7	7	14	14	42
Huskies	7	0	7	0	14

=== At Northwestern State ===
	1	2	3	4	Total
Huskies	14	7	7	0	28
Demons	7	3	7	14	31

=== Nicholls State ===
	1	2	3	4	Total
No. 20 Colonels	10	17	14	0	41
Huskies	0	0	7	13	20

=== At Lamar ===
	1	2	3	4	Total
Huskies	0	9	0	0	9
Cardinals	14	7	7	10	38

=== Sam Houston State ===
	1	2	3	4	Total
Bearkats	7	21	14	0	42
Huskies	3	7	3	7	20
