= YurView Louisiana =

Cable TV channel in Louisiana, United States

- Broadcast area: Baton Rouge, New Orleans, Louisiana, Lafayette, Louisiana, United States

Ownership
- Owner: Cox Communications

History
- Launched: 2001
- Former names: Cox 4 (2001-2017)

Links
- Website: YurView Louisiana

YurView Louisiana (previously Cox 4) is an American local cable-only public, educational, and government access (PEG) cable TV station in Baton Rouge, New Orleans, and Lafayette owned by Cox Communications. It first signed on as Cox 4 in 2001. In February 2017, Cox rebranded the channel as YurView Louisiana and began offering the channel in HD.

The station airs three local high school football games, televised live, in its "Cox 4 Game of the Week." There are also programs that discuss academic and athletic issues associated with LSU and Southern University. In addition to local sports, it also carries coverage of the American Athletic Conference.

Former Cox 4 logo
