= Red Beans and Rice Bowl =

American college football rivalry

- Central Arkansas Bears McNeese Cowboys
- Sport: Football
- First meeting: September 17, 1994; McNeese State 21, Central Arkansas 7
- Latest meeting: October 12, 2019; Central Arkansas 40, McNeese 31
- Trophy: Red Beans and Rice Bowl Trophy

Statistics
- Total meetings: 13
- All-time series: Central Arkansas leads, 7–6
- Largest victory: Central Arkansas, 35–0 (2016)
- Longest win streak: Central Arkansas, 3 (2010–2012)
- Current win streak: Central Arkansas, 1 (2019–present)

Locations of Central Arkansas and McNeese.

The Red Beans and Rice Bowl is the name of the rivalry between the Central Arkansas Bears and the McNeese Cowboys. The winner of the game receives a bronzed bowl trophy. The name of the game was chosen by the two schools to recognize the importance of the rice industry in Louisiana and Arkansas. The two teams have met thirteen times on the football field, with Central Arkansas leading 7–6.

== Game results ==
Central Arkansas victories	McNeese victories

No.	Date	Location	Winner	Score
1	September 17, 1994	Lake Charles, LA	McNeese State	21–7
2	November 17, 2007	Lake Charles, LA	McNeese State	41–14
3	November 22, 2008	Conway, AR	Central Arkansas	47–30
4	November 21, 2009	Lake Charles, LA	McNeese State	21–17
5	November 20, 2010	Conway, AR	Central Arkansas	28–24
6	October 15, 2011	Conway, AR	Central Arkansas	21–18
7	October 13, 2012	Lake Charles, LA	Central Arkansas	27–26
8	October 5, 2013	Conway, AR	McNeese State	59–28
9	October 17, 2015	Conway, AR	McNeese	28–13
10	October 15, 2016	Lake Charles, LA	Central Arkansas	35–0
11	October 28, 2017	Conway, AR	Central Arkansas	47–17
12	October 27, 2018	Lake Charles, LA	McNeese	23–21
13	October 12, 2019	Conway, AR	Central Arkansas	40–31
Series: Central Arkansas leads 7–6

== See also ==
- List of NCAA college football rivalry games
