= Cox Sports Television =

Regional sports network in Louisiana, United States

- Country: United States
- Broadcast area: Gulf South
- Headquarters: Metairie, Louisiana

Programming
- Language: English
- Picture format: 1080i (HDTV); 480i (SDTV)

Ownership
- Owner: Cox Communications

History
- Launched: October 28, 2002
- Closed: October 31, 2021
- Replaced by: YurView Louisiana, YurView Florida

Links
- Website: www.coxsportstv.com

Cox Sports Television (a.k.a. CST; sometimes referred to as Cox Sports TV) was an American regional sports cable and satellite television channel owned by Cox Communications. The channel, which served the Gulf South region of the United States, featured a mix of professional, collegiate and high school sporting events. Cox Sports Television was headquartered in the New Orleans suburb of Metairie, Louisiana. The network shut down on October 31, 2021, with much of its sports content moving to Cox's YurView channels in the region.

== History ==
Launched on October 28, 2002, the creation of the network played a key role in the relocation of the New Orleans Hornets NBA franchise from Charlotte, North Carolina. The only regional sports network serving New Orleans area viewers at the time was Fox Sports Southwest, and its coverage of Louisiana sporting events was limited.

From 2005 to 2010, Charter Communications did not carry the network on its Louisiana systems, despite having a carriage deal in place at the channel's launch in 2002. Because of this, Hornets games were not available to people living outside of the New Orleans metropolitan area during this time. In 2008, Cox and Charter negotiated a proposal to allow three Hornets games to be carried on local origination channels operated by Charter in the lead-up to that year's NBA All-Star Game as a precursor to a deal, however the discussions ended without a contract.

On December 15, 2010, Cox announced that it had finally reached a deal with Charter to carry the network on its systems again starting in 2011, a move done with the belief that the Hornets would remain in New Orleans for the foreseeable future. Cox Sports Television's standard definition and high definition feeds were added to Charter's Louisiana systems on January 1, 2011.

The channel was an initial affiliate of the American Sports Network with its first broadcast on August 30, 2014. Cox Sports New Orleans agreed to carry some games from the first season of the Fall Experimental Football League in October and November 2014.

Cox shut down Cox Sports Television as a separate channel on October 31, 2021, with key content being moved to the YurView channels in its service footprint, such as YurView Louisiana, YurView Florida, and YurView Arkansas.

== Programming ==
Cox Sports Television was the exclusive local television broadcaster of the New Orleans Hornets NBA games from 2002 to 2012. The channel held broadcast rights to the New Orleans Zephyrs Pacific Coast League franchise, and also broadcast preseason games from the National Football League's New Orleans Saints.

It also carried local college sporting events from LSU Tigers (men's and women's basketball, baseball, softball, and rebroadcasts of football games) on a tape-delayed basis, as well as coverage of the Louisiana Tech Bulldogs and Lady Techsters, Southern Jaguars and Lady Jaguars, New Orleans Privateers, Southeastern Louisiana Lions, Louisiana–Lafayette Ragin' Cajuns and other regional college teams. The channel also broadcast high school sports championship events sanctioned by the Louisiana High School Athletics Association (LHSAA) including football, boys' and girls' basketball, volleyball, baseball and softball, as well as 14 regular season football games.

The channel also broadcast college football and basketball games via American Sports Network and ESPN Plus featuring out-of-market teams, CFL football games, coaches' shows for the collegiate teams that Cox Sports Television maintains broadcast rights, outdoors programming, simulcasts of news programming from ESPNews, and assorted other events. The channel's flagship program was the hour-long sports highlight program CST Tonight; Cox Sports Television also produced and broadcast the New Orleans Saints' coaches' show.

== Availability ==
As of June 2017, Cox Sports Television was available in high-definition on Cox cable systems nationwide. It is also available on select Suddenlink Communications and Charter Communications systems in the region. A few smaller cable companies carried the channel as well. The channel did not have carriage deals with either AT&T U-verse, Dish Network, or DirecTV; its games were also available on ESPN3.
