= 2018 Incarnate Word Cardinals football team =

American college football season

2018 Incarnate Word Cardinals football

Southland co-champion

NCAA Division I First Round, L 14–35 vs. Montana State
- Conference: Southland Conference
- Record: 6–5 (6–2 Southland)
- Head coach: Eric Morris (1st season)
- Offensive coordinator: Cody Crill (1st season)
- Offensive scheme: Air raid
- Defensive coordinator: Justin Deason (1st season)
- Base defense: Multiple
- Home stadium: Gayle and Tom Benson Stadium

2018 Southland Conference football standings
| | Conf. | | | Overall |
| Team | W | | L | W | | L |
|---|---|---|---|---|---|---|
| No. 14 Nicholls +^ | 7 | – | 2 | 9 | – | 4 |
| Incarnate Word +^ | 6 | – | 2 | 6 | – | 5 |
| Lamar ^ | 6 | – | 3 | 7 | – | 5 |
| Abilene Christian | 5 | – | 4 | 6 | – | 5 |
| Central Arkansas | 5 | – | 4 | 6 | – | 5 |
| McNeese State | 5 | – | 4 | 6 | – | 5 |
| Sam Houston State | 5 | – | 4 | 6 | – | 5 |
| Northwestern State | 4 | – | 5 | 5 | – | 6 |
| Southeastern Louisiana | 4 | – | 5 | 4 | – | 7 |
| Stephen F. Austin | 2 | – | 7 | 2 | – | 8 |
| Houston Baptist | 0 | – | 9 | 1 | – | 10 |
+ – Conference co-champions; ^ – FCS playoff participant; Rankings from STATS poll

The 2018 Incarnate Word Cardinals football team represented the University of the Incarnate Word (UIW) in the 2018 NCAA Division I FCS football season as a member of the Southland Conference. The Cardinals played their home games at Gayle and Tom Benson Stadium in San Antonio, Texas. They were led by first year head coach Eric Morris. Due to the scheduling structure of the Southland, the team was slated to play eight conference games while every other team played nine. They finished the season 6–5, 6–2 in Southland play to win a share of the Southland Conference championship, as they shared the same number of losses as Nicholls (who went 7–2). They received an at-large bid to the FCS Playoffs, where they lost in the first round to Montana State. The Cardinals were set to play the Iowa State Cyclones during the first weekend in December, but the game was cancelled.

== Preseason ==
=== Preseason All-Conference Teams ===
On July 12, 2018, the Southland announced their Preseason All-Conference Teams, with the Cardinals placing one player on the second team.

Offense Second Team

- Kody Edwards – Sr. WR

=== Preseason poll ===
On July 19, 2018, the Southland announced their preseason poll, with the Cardinals predicted to finish in ninth place.

== Schedule ==
| Date | Time | Opponent | Rank | Site | TV | Result | Attendance |
|---|---|---|---|---|---|---|---|
| September 1 | 7:00 p.m. | at New Mexico* | | Dreamstyle Stadium; Albuquerque, NM | ESPN3 | L 30–62 | 18,213 |
| September 8 | 6:30 p.m. | at North Texas* | | Apogee Stadium; Denton, TX | ESPN+ | L 16–58 | 18,538 |
| September 15 | 6:00 p.m. | Stephen F. Austin | | Gayle and Tom Benson Stadium; San Antonio, TX | UIWtv | W 31–7 | 3,311 |
| September 29 | 6:00 p.m. | at Abilene Christian | | Wildcat Stadium; Abilene, TX | ESPN+ | W 44–34 | 9,751 |
| October 6 | 4:00 p.m. | Southeastern Louisiana | | Gayle and Tom Benson Stadium; San Antonio, TX | UIWtv | W 52–34 | 2,345 |
| October 13 | 3:00 p.m. | at Lamar | | Provost Umphrey Stadium; Beaumont, TX | ESPN+ | L 21–27 | 6,113 |
| October 20 | 6:00 p.m. | No. 6 McNeese State | | Gayle and Tom Benson Stadium; San Antonio, TX | Eleven Sports | W 45–17 | 3,084 |
| October 27 | 3:00 p.m. | at No. 20 Nicholls | | John L. Guidry Stadium; Thibodaux, LA | SLC Digital | L 21–48 | 8,061 |
| November 3 | 2:00 p.m. | No. 21 Sam Houston State^{†} | | Gayle and Tom Benson Stadium; San Antonio, TX | ESPN3 | W 43–26 | 5,643 |
| November 10 | 3:00 p.m. | at Central Arkansas | | Estes Stadium; Conway, AR | SLC Digital | W 40–27 | 4,457 |
| November 24 | 2:00 p.m. | at No. 23 Montana State* | No. 24 | Bobcat Stadium; Bozeman, MT (NCAA Division I First Round) | ESPN3 | L 14–35 | 10,017 |
*Non-conference game; ^{†}Homecoming; Rankings from STATS Poll released prior to the game; All times are in Central time

== Personnel ==
=== Coaching staff ===
| Name | Position | Alma mater | Joined staff |
| Eric Morris | Head coach | Texas Tech (2008) | 2018 |
| Josh Kirkland | Assistant head coach / running backs | West Texas A&M | 2018 |
| Cody Crill | Offensive coordinator | Angelo State (2002) | 2018 |
| Justin Deason | Defensive coordinator | Central Oklahoma (2003) | 2018 |
| Brandon Lechtenberg | Linebackers / special teams coordinator | Nebraska | 2018 |
| Rickey Hunley | Safeties / recruiting coordinator | Drake | 2018 |
| Brett Watson | Defensive tackles / camps coordinator | West Texas A&M (2009) | 2018 |
| Darren Garrigan | Cornerbacks | West Texas A&M (2009) | 2018 |
| Steve Foley | Defensive ends | Louisiana-Monroe (1997) | 2018 |
| Jordan Shoemaker | Offensive line | Houston | 2018 |
| Jordan Davis | Wide receivers | Texas Tech | 2018 |
| Clint Killough | Quality control – Wide receivers | Incarnate Word (2015) | 2018 |
| Tad Blaylock | Director of football operations | Mississippi State (2012) | 2018 |
| Tre Spragg | Graduate Assistant (Defense) | Incarnate Word | 2017 |
| Miguel Rodriguez | Graduate Assistant (linebackers) | UTSA (2014) | 2017 |
| Bret Huth | Director of strength and conditioning | John Carroll (2010) | 2018 |
| Mack Leftwich | Administrative Graduate Assistant (Offense) | UTEP | 2018 |
| Nathan Thompson | Administrative Graduate Assistant (Offense) | Incarnate Word (2016) | 2018 |
| Anthony Marciano | Administrative Graduate Assistant | Incarnate Word (2018) | 2018 |

=== Roster ===
2018 Incarnate Word Cardinals football
| Quarterback: 1 Jon Copeland – freshman (6'0, 201); 3 Sean Brophy – junior (6'2, 204); 5 Kyle Fuller – (redshirt) sophomore (6'3, 201); 10 Chandler Herman – sophomore (6'2, 224); 13 Brooks Klutts – freshman (6'1, 170); 16 Cole Brownholtz – junior (6'2, 200); 17 Taylor Brown – senior (6'1, 222); Running back: 4 Ra'Quanne Dickens – senior (5'10, 195); 7 Dorland Fields – (redshirt) senior (5'9, 195); 19 Keshon Leonard – (redshirt) senior (5'7, 170); 22 Ameer King – freshman (5'8, 181); 29 Keyondrick Philio – sophomore (6'0, 207); 30 Elijah Salazar – (redshirt) junior (5'9, 186); 31 Mason Barnes – freshman (5'10, 171); 38 Antonio Arredondo – freshman (5'9, 201); 46 Phillip Higgins – (redshirt) junior (6'0, 256); Wide receiver: 2 Cam Johnson – (redshirt) sophomore (6'0, 187); 6 Lamont Johnson – senior (6'0, 165); 8 Gunnar Henderson – freshman (5'9, 168); 11 Zaire Andre – senior (6'0, 172); 12 Brandon McDuffie – freshman (6'3, 195); 14 Kam Williams – junior (6'2, 232); 15 Jaelin Campbell – freshman (6'1, 184); 17 Mark Sullivan – freshman (6'2, 161); 21 Phillip Baptiste – senior (6'0, 186); 81 Kody Edwards (C) – (redshirt) senior (6'0, 159); 82 Kolby Anthony – (redshirt) junior (5'10, 188); 83 Ethan Vela – freshman (5'8, 177); 84 Tyreese Andrus – freshman (5'10, 181); 85 Michael Arguelles – sophomore (6'2, 196); 88 Jordan Baker – freshman (5'8, 166); 89 Connor Fisher – freshman (6'4, 193); Tight end: 80 Jezel Parra – senior (6'3, 239); Long snapper: 98 Trevor Howard – freshman (6'0, 170) | Offensive line: 61 Matthew Alvarez – OL – freshman (6'4, 298); 62 Dawson Kier – C – (redshirt) sophomore (6'3, 254); 63 Tyler Preston (C) – C – (redshirt) senior (6'3, 300); 64 Cameron Chavez – OL – freshman (6'0, 266); 65 Richard LeFevre – OL – freshman (6'4, 302); 66 Levi Swang – OG – (redshirt) sophomore (6'5, 273); 68 Roland Caldera – OL – sophomore (6'2, 273); 69 John Myers – OT – (redshirt) junior (6'6, 286); 70 Ryan Carlson – OT – (redshirt) sophomore (6'7, 289); 71 Cameron Wilson – OG – (redshirt) junior (6'5, 289); 72 Brandon Floores – C/OG – junior (6'4, 292); 73 Jeremiah Williams – OG – freshman (6'2, 312); 74 Corey Young – OT – freshman (6'4, 272); 75 Jeremy Jones – OT – (redshirt) junior (6'5, 287); 76 Jeriel Cervantes – OL – (redshirt) freshman (6'5, 265); 77 Terence Hickman II – OT – junior (6'3, 277); 78 Uzoma Okere – OG – (redshirt) sophomore (6'2, 290); 79 Ricardo Cerda Jr. – OL – freshman (6'1, 292); Defensive line: 2 Justin Alexandre – DE – senior (6'5, 256); 11 Lukas Termin – DL – junior (6'2, 272); 45 Jared Soyring – DL – freshman (6'3, 262); 49 Travis Quillin – DE – junior (6'2, 244); 50 Heath Panks – DL – freshman (6'2, 256); 53 Sam Brooks – DL – freshman (6'2, 202); 55 Darius Montgomery – DE – (redshirt) senior (6'2, 285); 90 Matthew Yarbrough – DT – junior (6'0, 308); 91 Josh Wells – DE – (redshirt) freshman (6'2, 229); 92 Malik Harris – DE – senior (6'5, 263); 93 Cameron Preston – DT – freshman (6'2, 300); 95 Jordan Collins – DT – senior (5'10, 308); 96 John Williams – DT – senior (6'3, 280); 97 Josh Jackson – DT – freshman (6'0, 308); 99 Javon Wright – DE – sophomore (6'5, 240); Kicker: 41 Cody Seidel (C) – senior (6'2, 191); 49 David Albert – junior (5'11, 181); 59 Rhett Marshall – freshman (5'10, 164) | Linebacker: 9 Mar’kel Cooks (C) – ILB – junior (6'0, 210); 12 Silas Stewart (C) – OLB – senior (6'3, 219); 21 Isaiah Paul – OLB – freshman (6'2, 231); 32 Gerald Bowie – LB – freshman (6'1, 234); 33 Jerick Pitre – LB – (redshirt) sophomore (5'11, 196); 34 Rodger Adame III – LB – freshman (5'11, 217); 35 Tyler Jackson – ILB – freshman (6'1, 225); 36 Dax Eisinger – ILB – senior (6'2, 225); 42 Brian Lee – LB/DE – junior (6'0, 242); 43 West Lambert – ILB – (redshirt) junior (6'0, 225); 44 Kelechi Anyalebechi – LB/DE – freshman (6'1, 257); 47 Raynard Taylor – ILB – (redshirt) sophomore (5'8, 240); 54 Josh Centeno – LB – freshman (6'0, 208); 56 Andy Jennings – OLB – (redshirt) junior (6'2, 248); 57 Ian Irby – LB – freshman (6'0, 198); 58 Karter King – LB – freshman (6'0, 224); Defensive back: 3 Chris Thomas – CB – junior (6'2, 189); 5 Dalvin Fillmore – S – freshman (6'0, 186); 7 Jamarkese Williams – CB – (redshirt) senior (6'3, 198); 10 Louis Otis – CB – junior (6'3, 187); 13 Shaquirius Miller – S – (redshirt) sophomore (5'10, 172); 18 Cam Knight – DB – senior (5'10, 200); 20 Ian Peterson – CB – (redshirt) sophomore (5'11, 180); 23 Kyle Covington – S – junior (6'2, 201); 24 JaVon Burse – CB – (redshirt) junior (6'0, 187); 25 Malick Phillips – CB – sophomore (5'10, 165); 26 Ce'Cori Tolds – CB – freshman (5'10, 148); 27 Jawun Jiles – S/LB – senior (5'10, 199); 28 Adam Garza – DB – (redshirt) junior (5'10, 179); 33 Justin Smith – DB – freshman (5'10, 175); 39 Brandon Sanders – DB – sophomore (6'0, 188); 40 Javier Macias – DB – sophomore (5'8, 174); 48 Jalen Brooks – CB – freshman (6'0, 176); Punter: 37 Cade Kostroun – sophomore (6'3, 175); 52 David Balcomb – junior (6'0, 184); Legend: (C) Team captain; (S) Suspended; (I) Ineligible; Injured; Redshirt |

== Depth chart ==
Defense

FS
18 Cam Knight, Sr
13 Shaquirius Miller, So
⋅

| SAM | MIKE | MO |
|---|---|---|
| 27 Jawun Jiles, Sr | 9 Mar'kel Cooks, Jr | 12 Silas Stewart, Sr |
| 33 Jerick Pitre, So | 43 West Lambert, Jr | 35 Tyler Jackson, Fr |
| ⋅ | 32 Gerald Bowie, Fr | 42 Brian Lee, Jr |

SS
23 Kyle Covington, Jr
20 Ian Peterson, Fr
5 Dalvin Filmore, Fr

CB
26 Ce'Cori Tolds, Fr
3 Chris Thomas, Jr
25 Malick Phillips, So

| DE | DT | DT | DE |
|---|---|---|---|
| 2 Justin Alexandre, Sr | 96 John Williams, Sr | 11 Lukas Termin, Jr | 99 Javon Wright, So |
| 92 Malik Harris, Sr | 97 Josh Jackson, Fr | 45 Jared Soyring, Fr | 55 Darrius Montgomery, Sr |
| 44 Kelechi Anyalebechi, Fr | 95 Jordan Collins, Sr | 93 Cameron Preston, Fr | 91 Josh Wells, Fr |

CB
7 Jamarkese Williams, Sr
10 Louis Otis, Jr
⋅

Offense

X
21 Phillip Baptiste, Sr
14 Kam Williams, Jr
11 Zaire Andre, Sr

Z
6 Lamont Johnson, Sr
17 Mark Sullivan, Fr
8 Gunnar Henderson, Fr

| LT | LG | C | RG | RT |
|---|---|---|---|---|
| 77 Terence Hickman, Jr | 71 Cameron Wilson, Jr | 72 Brandon Floores, Jr | 78 Uzoma Okere, So | 75 Jeremy Jones, Jr |
| 69 John Myers, Jr | 66 Levi Swang, So | 63 Tyler Preston, Sr | 73 Jeremiah Williams, Fr | 74 Corey Young, Fr |
| ⋅ | ⋅ | 62 Dawson Kier, So | ⋅ | ⋅ |

B
80 Jezel Parra, Sr
46 Phillip Higgins, Jr
⋅

Y
81 Kody Edwards, Sr
2 Cam Johnson, So
82 Colby Anthony, Jr

QB
1 Jon Copeland, Fr
3 Sean Brophy, Jr
5 Kyle Fuller, So

RB
4 Ra'Quanne Dickens, Sr
22 Ameer King, Fr
29 Keyondrick Philio, So

Special teams
PK 41 Cody Seidel, Sr
PK 59 Rhett Marshall, Fr
P 52 David Balcomb, Jr
P 37 Cade Kostroun, So
KR 15 Jaelin Campbell, Fr
PR 81 Kody Edwards, Sr
LS 91 Josh Wells, Fr
H 37 Cade Kostroun, So

== Postseason honors ==
The following Cardinals received postseason honors for the 2018 season:

STATS FCS All-American Third Team
RB Ra'Quanne Dickens – Senior

Hero Sports All-American Third Team
RB Ra'Quanne Dickens – Senior

Hero Sports FCS Freshman All-American First Team
QB Jon Copeland

AFCA Regional Coach of the Year
Eric Morris

Southland Conference Coach of the Year
Eric Morris

Southland Conference Freshman of the Year
QB Jon Copeland

All–Southland Conference First–Team
RB Ra'Quanne Dickens – Senior
WR Phillip Baptiste – Senior
OL Brandon Floores – Junior
DL Justin Alexandre – Senior

All–Southland Conference Second–Team
QB Jon Copeland – Freshman
OL Terence Hickman II – Junior
LB Silas Stewart – Senior

All–Southland Conference Honorable Mention
WR Kody Edwards – Senior
RB Ameer King – Freshman
DL Darrius Montgomery – Senior
LB Mar'kel Cooks – Junior
LB West Lambert – Junior
DB Malick Phillips – Sophomore
DB Louis Otis – Junior

NFLPA Collegiate Bowl Participant
LB Silas Stewart – Senior

College Gridiorn Showcase All-Star Game Participant
DL Justin Alexandre – Senior

== Game summaries ==
=== @ New Mexico ===
Incarnate Word Cardinals at New Mexico Lobos

| Quarter | 1 | 2 | 3 | 4 | Total |
|---|---|---|---|---|---|
| Cardinals | 7 | 9 | 0 | 14 | 30 |
| Lobos | 28 | 7 | 13 | 14 | 62 |

at Dreamstyle Stadium, Albuquerque, New Mexico

- Date: September 1, 2018
- Game time: 7:00 p.m.
- Game weather: Temperature: 74 • Wind: None • Weather: Cloudy
- Game attendance: 18,213
- Referee: Vidal Jones
- TV announcers (ESPN3): David Saltzman (play-by-play) & Doug Graber (analyst)
- Box Score

Game information

First Quarter

- UIW – 11:00 Jon Copeland 1 yard run, Cody Seidel kick
  UIW 7–0 Drive: 13 plays, 75 yards, 4:00
- UNM – 8:54 Marcus Williams 10 yard pass from Tevaka Tuioti, Andrew Shelley kick
  Tied 7–7 Drive: 6 plays, 60 yards, 1:57
- UNM – 4:30 Tevaka Tuioti 12 yard run, Andrew Shelley kick
  UNM 14–7 Drive: 9 plays, 66 yards, 3:42
- UNM – 1:36 Tyrone Owens 6 yard run, Andrew Shelley kick
  UNM 21–7 Drive: 5 plays, 60 yards, 1:13
- UNM – 0:00 Patrick Reed 69 yard pass from Tevaka Tuioti, Andrew Shelley kick
  UNM 28–7 Drive: 3 plays, 67 yards, 0:51

Second Quarter

- UIW – 7:58 Ra'Quanne Dickens 90 yard run, Cody Seidel rush failed
  UNM 28–13 Drive: 1 play, 90 yards, 0:15
- UIW – 1:01 Cody Seidel 29 yard field goal
  UNM 28–16 Drive: 8 plays, 85 yards, 2:45
- UNM – 0:05 Elijah Lilly 51 yard pass from Tevaka Tuioti, Andrew Shelley kick
  UNM 35–16 Drive: 1 play, 51 yards, 0:09

Third Quarter

- UNM – 13:10 Tyrone Owens 2 yard run, Andrew Shelley kick failed
  UNM 41–16 Drive: 5 plays, 85 yards, 1:43
- UNM – 2:32 Marcus Williams 33 yard pass from Tevaka Tuioti, Andrew Shelley kick
  UNM 48–16 Drive: 12 plays, 74 yards, 5:29

Fourth Quarter

- UNM – 12:36 Coltin Gerhart 1 yard run, Andrew Shelley kick
  UNM 55–16 Drive: 8 plays, 39 yards, 3:39
- UIW – 10:10 Phillip Baptiste 16 yard pass from Jon Copeland, Cody Seidel kick
  UNM 55–23 Drive: 6 plays, 78 yards, 2:20
- UNM – 2:58 Anu Somoye 22 yard pass from Sheriron Jones, Andrew Shelley kick
  UNM 62–23 Drive: 6 plays, 40 yards, 3:21
- UIW – 0:58 Brandon McDuffie 4 yard run, Cody Seidel kick
  UNM 62–30 Drive: 5 plays, 83 yards, 1:55

Passing

- UIW – Jon Copeland 17/36, 328 YDS, 1 TD, 1 INT
- UNM – Tevaka Tuioti 13/21, 327 YDS, 4 TD, 1 INT

Rushing

- UIW – Ra'Quanne Dickens 7 ATT, 110 YDS, 1 TD
- UNM – Zahneer Shuler 5 ATT, 90 YDS

Receiving

- UIW – Phillip Baptiste 6 REC, 112 YDS, 1 TD
- UNM – Patrick Reed 1 REC, 69 YDS, 1 TD

=== @ North Texas ===
Incarnate Word Cardinals at North Texas Mean Green

| Quarter | 1 | 2 | 3 | 4 | Total |
|---|---|---|---|---|---|
| Cardinals | 6 | 0 | 10 | 0 | 16 |
| Mean Green | 10 | 31 | 14 | 3 | 58 |

at Apogee Stadium, Denton, Texas

- Date: September 8, 2018
- Game time: 6:30 p.m.
- Game weather: Temperature: 75 • Wind: N 5 mph • Weather: Overcast
- Game attendance: 18,538
- Referee: Joe Lehring
- TV announcers (ESPN+): Doug Anderson (play-by-play) & LaDarrin McLane (analyst)
- Box Score

Game information

First Quarter

- UNT – 10:08 DeAndre Torrey 1 yard run, Cole Hedlund kick
  UNT 7–0 Drive: 15 plays, 75 yards, 4:52
- UNT – 6:22 Cole Hedlund 29 yard field goal
  UNT 10–0 Drive: 6 plays, 45 yards, 2:06
- UIW – 5:32 Ra'Quanne Dickens 55 yard run, Cody Seidel kick blocked
  UNT 10–6 Drive: 3 plays, 75 yards, 0:50

Second Quarter

- UNT – 14:28 DeAndre Torrey 1 yard run, Cole Hedlund kick
  UNT 17–6 Drive: 8 plays, 38 yards, 3:00
- UNT – 10:48 Jalen Guyton 15 yard pass from Mason Fine, Cole Hedlund kick
  UNT 24–6 Drive: 4 plays, 46 yards, 1:07
- UNT – 6:56 DeAndre Torrey 1 yard run, Cole Hedlund kick
  UNT 31–6 Drive: 7 plays, 84 yards, 2:20
- UNT – 1:11 Rico Bussey 13 yard pass from Mason Fine, Cole Hedlund kick
  UNT 38–6 Drive: 5 plays, 29 yards, 1:45
- UNT – 0:00 Cole Hedlund 27 yard field goal
  UNT 41–6 Drive: 7 plays, 46 yards, 0:47

Third Quarter

- UIW – 9:15 Cody Seidel 29 yard field goal
  UNT 41–9 Drive: 13 plays, 72 yards, 5:45
- UNT – 8:02 Rico Bussey 35 yard pass from Mason Fine, Cole Hedlund kick
  UNT 48–9 Drive: 3 plays, 68 yards, 1:13
- UNT – 6:04 Rico Bussey 3 yard pass from Mason Fine, Cole Hedlund kick
  UNT 55–9 Drive: 2 plays, 49 yards, 0:22
- UIW – 2:30 Ra'Quanne Dickens 42 yard run, Cody Seidel kick
  UNT 55–16 Drive: 8 plays, 75 yards, 3:34

Fourth Quarter

- UNT – 12:49 Cole Hedlund 25 yard field goal
  UNT 58–16 Drive: 12 plays, 65 yards, 4:41

Passing

- UIW – Jon Copeland 16/30, 152 YDS, 2 INT
- UNT – Mason Fine 25/40, 418 YDS, 4 TD, 1 INT

Rushing

- UIW – Ra'Quanne Dickens 18 ATT, 139 YDS, 2 TD
- UNT – DeAndre Torrey 16 ATT, 44 YDS, 3 TD

Receiving

- UIW – Phillip Baptiste 6 REC, 79 YDS
- UNT – Rico Bussey 8 REC, 128 YDS, 3 TD

=== Stephen F. Austin ===
Stephen F. Austin Lumberjacks at Incarnate Word Cardinals

| Quarter | 1 | 2 | 3 | 4 | Total |
|---|---|---|---|---|---|
| Lumberjacks | 7 | 0 | 0 | 0 | 7 |
| Cardinals | 10 | 21 | 0 | 0 | 31 |

at Gayle and Tom Benson Stadium, San Antonio, Texas

- Date: September 15, 2018
- Game time: 6:00 p.m.
- Game weather: Temperature: 82 • Wind: E 13 mph • Weather: Rain
- Game attendance: 3,311
- Referee: Chris Watson
- TV announcers (UIWtv): Jaime Valdes (play-by-play) & Chris Reyes (analyst)
- Box Score

Game information

First Quarter

- UIW – 12:16 Ra'Quanne Dickens 13 yard run, Rhett Marshall kick
  UIW 7–0 Drive: 9 plays, 77 yards, 2:44
- UIW – 5:09 Rhett Marshall 27 yard field goal
  UIW 10–0 Drive: 10 plays, 67 yards, 2:55
- SFA – 2:32 Josh McGowen 14 yard pass from Foster Sawyer, Storm Ruiz kick
  UIW 10–7 Drive: 7 plays, 53 yards, 2:32

Second Quarter

- UIW – 9:46 Kam Williams 27 yard pass from Jon Copeland, Rhett Marshall kick
  UIW 17–7 Drive: 4 plays, 51 yards, 1:45
- UIW – 0:49 Ra'Quanne Dickens 79 yard run, Rhett Marshall kick
  UIW 24–7 Drive: 3 plays, 97 yards, 0:31
- UIW – 0:26 Kam Williams 18 yard pass from Jon Copeland, Rhett Marshall kick
  UIW 31–7 Drive: 1 play, 18 yards, 0:07

Passing

- SFA – Jake Blumrick 15/25, 148 YDS, 1 INT
- UIW – Jon Copeland 15/33, 180 YDS, 2 TD, 2 INT

Rushing

- SFA – Jamall Shaw 11 ATT, 72 YDS
- UIW – Ra'Quanne Dickens 17 ATT, 220 YDS, 2 TD

Receiving

- SFA – Terian Goree 7 REC, 63 YDS
- UIW – Kody Edwards 7 REC, 65 YDS

=== @ Abilene Christian ===
Incarnate Word Cardinals at Abilene Christian Wildcats

| Quarter | 1 | 2 | 3 | 4 | Total |
|---|---|---|---|---|---|
| Cardinals | 14 | 13 | 10 | 7 | 44 |
| Wildcats | 14 | 14 | 0 | 6 | 34 |

at Anthony Field at Wildcat Stadium, Abilene, Texas

- Date: September 29, 2018
- Game time: 6:00 p.m.
- Game weather: Temperature: 82 • Wind: SSE 6 mph • Weather: Partly cloudy
- Game attendance: 9,751
- Referee: Vidal Jones
- TV announcers (ESPN+): Grant Boone (play-by-play) & Jim Reese (analyst)
- Box Score

Game information

First Quarter

- UIW – 5:26 Billy McCrary 31 yard run, Oscar Hernandez kick
  ACU 7–0 Drive: 1 play, 11 yards, 0:27
- UIW – 4:23 Kody Edwards 58 yard pass from Jon Copeland, Cody Seidel kick
  Tied 7–7 Drive: 4 plays, 75 yards, 1:03
- ACU – 1:43 Tyrese White 22 yard pass from Luke Anthony, Oscar Hernandez kick
  ACU 14–7 Drive: 8 plays, 65 yards, 2:40
- UIW – 0:10 Lamont Johnson 8 yard pass from Jon Copeland, Cody Seidel kick
  Tied 14–14 Drive: 5 plays, 75 yards, 1:33

Second Quarter

- ACU – 9:39 Tracy James 1 yard run, Oscar Hernandez kick
  ACU 21–14 Drive: 10 plays, 80 yards, 3:49
- UIW – 8:13 Ra'Quanne Dickens 1 yard run, Cody Seidel kick blocked
  ACU 21–20 Drive: 5 plays, 39 yards, 1:17
- ACU – 1:59 Torin Justice 4 yard pass from Luke Anthony, Oscar Hernandez kick
  ACU 28–20 Drive: 13 plays, 75 yards, 6:14
- UIW – 0:09 Ra'Quanne Dickens 66 yard run, Cody Seidel kick
  ACU 28–27 Drive: 2 plays, 66 yards, 0:16

Third Quarter

- UIW – 3:30 Jon Copeland 8 yard pass from Kam Williams, Rhett Marshall kick
  UIW 34–28 Drive: 10 plays, 89 yards, 2:10
- UIW – 0:57 Rhett Marshall 48 yard field goal
  UIW 37–28 Drive: 5 plays, 15 yards, 1:21

Fourth Quarter

- UIW – 13:39 Phillip Baptiste 21 yard pass from Jon Copeland, Rhett Marshall kick
  UIW 44–28 Drive: 3 plays, 28 yards, 1:21
- ACU – 9:59 Tyrese White 2 yard pass from Luke Anthony, Luke Anthony pass failed
  UIW 44–34 Drive: 10 plays, 72 yards, 3:35

Passing

- UIW – Jon Copeland 15/36, 258 YDS, 3 TD, 1 INT
- ACU – Luke Anthony 35/55, 345 YDS, 3 TD, 1 INT

Rushing

- UIW – Ra'Quanne Dickens 15 ATT, 118 YDS, 2 TD
- ACU – Billy McCrary 18 ATT, 126 YDS, 1 TD

Receiving

- UIW – Kody Edwards 5 REC, 133 YDS, 1 TD
- ACU – Josh Fink 7 REC, 117 YDS

=== Southeastern Louisiana ===
Southeastern Louisiana Lions at Incarnate Word Cardinals

| Quarter | 1 | 2 | 3 | 4 | Total |
|---|---|---|---|---|---|
| Lions | 14 | 7 | 0 | 13 | 34 |
| Cardinals | 3 | 28 | 14 | 7 | 52 |

at Gayle and Tom Benson Stadium, San Antonio, Texas

- Date: October 6, 2018
- Game time: 4:00 p.m.
- Game attendance: 2,345
- Referee: Dan Lewis
- TV announcers (UIWtv): Jaime Valdes (play-by-play) & Chris Reyes (analyst)
- Box Score

Game information

First Quarter

- SLU – 11:52 Juwan Petit-Frere 71 yard run, Jonathan Tatum kick
  SLU 7–0 Drive: 2 plays, 71 yards, 0:18
- UIW – 8:58 Rhett Marshall 47 yard field goal
  SLU 7–3 Drive: 7 plays, 35 yards, 2:46
- SLU – 8:20 Juwan Petit-Frere 74 yard pass from Chason Virgil, Jonathan Tatum kick
  SLU 14–3 Drive: 2 play, 75 yards, 0:38

Second Quarter

- UIW – 11:38 Ra'Quanne Dickens 4 yard run, Cody Seidel kick
  SLU 14–10 Drive: 8 play, 80 yards, 2:09
- UIW – 8:16 Darrius Montgomery 55 yard interception return, Cody Seidel kick
  UIW 17–14
- UIW – 1:30 Ameer King 7 yard run, Cody Seidel kick
  UIW 24–14 Drive: 13 plays, 86 yards, 4:16
- SLU – 0:37 Darren Johnson 15 yard pass from Chason Virgil, Jonathan Tatum kick
  UIW 24–21 Drive: 5 plays, 43 yards, 0:47
- UIW – 0:09 Phillip Baptiste 35 yard pass from Jon Copeland, Cody Seidel kick
  UIW 31–21 Drive: 3 plays, 75 yards, 0:28

Third Quarter

- UIW – 10:50 Luke Termin 0 yard fumble recovery, Cody Seidel kick
  UIW 38–21
- UIW – 3:10 Kam Williams 11 yard pass from Jon Copeland, Cody Seidel kick
  UIW 45–21 Drive: 10 plays, 89 yards, 4:39

Fourth Quarter

- SLU – 10:07 Devonte Williams 1 yard run, Chason Virgil pass failed
  UIW 45–27 Drive: 13 plays, 80 yards, 3:22
- UIW – 8:17 Phillip Baptiste 43 yard pass from Jon Copeland, Cody Seidel kick
  UIW 52–27 Drive: 4 play, 93 yards, 1:45
- SLU– 0:38 Devonte Williams 3 yard run, Jonathan Tatum kick
  UIW 52–34 Drive: 11 plays, 70 yards, 3:37

Passing

- SLU – Chason Virgil 27/41, 315 YDS, 2 TD, 2 INT
- UIW – Jon Copeland 23/37, 411 YDS, 3 TD

Rushing

- SLU – Darren Johnson 11 ATT, 67 YDS, 1 TD
- UIW – Ameer King 17 ATT, 180 YDS, 1 TD

Receiving

- SLU – Juwan Petit-Frere 6 REC, 131 YDS, 1 TD
- UIW – Phillip Baptiste 7 REC, 174 YDS, 2 TD

=== @ Lamar ===
Incarnate Word Cardinals at Lamar Cardinals

| Quarter | 1 | 2 | 3 | 4 | Total |
|---|---|---|---|---|---|
| Cardinals (UIW) | 7 | 0 | 7 | 7 | 21 |
| Cardinals (LU) | 0 | 7 | 7 | 13 | 27 |

at Provost Umphrey Stadium, Beaumont, Texas

- Date: October 13, 2018
- Game time: 3:00 pm
- Game weather: Temperature: 87 • Wind: S 10 mph • Weather: Mostly cloudy
- Game attendance: 6,113
- Referee: Chris Watson
- TV: ESPN+
- Box Score

Game information

First Quarter

- UIW – 10:59 Lamont Johnson 50 yard pass from Jon Copeland, Cody Seidel kick
  UIW 7–0 Drive: 5 plays, 70 yards, 1:26

Second Quarter

- LU – 13:44 Jawun Ruffin 89 yard pass from Darrel Colbert, Elvin Martinez kick
  Tied 7–7 Drive: 1 plays, 89 yards, 0:20

Third Quarter

- LU – 12:14 Zae Giles 40 yard pass from Darrel Colbert, Elvin Martinez kick
  LU 14–7 Drive: 6 plays, 75 yards, 2:46
- UIW – 3:11 Ra'Quanne Dickens 1 yard run, Cody Seidel kick
  Tied 14–14 Drive: 12 plays, 74 yards, 4:50

Fourth Quarter

- LU – 13:59 Darrel Colbert 1 yard run, Elvin Martinez kick
  LU 21–14 Drive: 9 plays, 75 yards, 4:12
- UIW – 13:28 Lamont Johnson 4 yard pass from Jon Copeland, Cody Seidel kick
  Tied 21–21 Drive: 9 plays, 75 yards, 0:31
- LU – 0:00 Caleb Abrom 66 yard blocked field goal return
  LU 27–21

Passing

- UIW – Jon Copeland 39/56, 515 YDS, 2 TD, 4 INT
- LU – Darrel Colbert 14/25, 254 YDS, 2 TD

Rushing

- UIW – Ra'Quanne Dickens 17 ATT, 57 YDS, 1 TD
- LU – Myles Wanza 14 ATT, 79 YDS

Receiving

- UIW – Kam Williams 10 REC, 153 YDS
- LU – Jawun Ruffin 3 REC, 104 YDS, 1 TD

=== McNeese State ===
McNeese State Cowboys at Incarnate Word Cardinals

| Quarter | 1 | 2 | 3 | 4 | Total |
|---|---|---|---|---|---|
| No. 6 Cowboys | 3 | 0 | 7 | 7 | 17 |
| Cardinals | 14 | 14 | 10 | 7 | 45 |

at Gayle and Tom Benson Stadium, San Antonio, Texas

- Date: October 20, 2018
- Game time: 6:00 p.m.
- Game attendance: 3,084
- Referee: Vidal Jones
- TV: Eleven Sports
- Box Score

Game information

First Quarter

- UIW – 12:22 Phillip Baptiste 20 yard pass from Jon Copeland, Cody Seidel kick
  UIW 7–0 Drive: 6 plays, 50 yards, 1:55
- MCN – 6:15 Gunnar Raborn 37 yard field goal
  UIW 7–3 Drive: 14 plays, 55 yards, 6:15
- UIW – 2:33 Lamont Johnson 8 yard pass from Jon Copeland, Cody Seidel kick
  UIW 14–3 Drive: 10 plays, 89 yards, 3:27

Second Quarter

- UIW – 6:53 Ra'Quanne Dickens 7 yard run, Cody Seidel kick
  UIW 21–3 Drive: 11 plays, 76 yards, 3:45
- UIW – 2:01 Jon Copeland 4 yard run, Cody Seidel kick
  UIW 28–3 Drive: 7 plays, 28 yards, 2:04

Third Quarter

- MCN – 12:13 Kylon Highshaw 4 yard pass from James Tabary, Gunnar Raborn kick
  UIW 28–10 Drive: 5 plays, 33 yards, 2:13
- UIW – 6:50 Cody Seidel 35 yard field goal
  UIW 31–10 Drive: 9 plays, 38 yards, 2:44
- UIW – 1:50 Phillip Baptiste 15 yard pass from Jon Copeland, Cody Seidel kick
  UIW 38–10 Drive: 5 plays, 36 yards, 2:15

Fourth Quarter

- MCN – 14:56 Lawayne Ross 2 yard pass from Cody Orgeron, Gunnar Raborn kick
  UIW 38–17 Drive: 6 plays, 87 yards, 1:54
- UIW – 6:31 Louis Otis 37 yard interception return, Cody Seidel kick
  UIW 45–17

Passing

- MCN – Cody Orgeron 8/17, 80 YDS, 1 TD, 1 INT
- UIW – Jon Copeland 24/41, 236 YDS, 3 TD, 1 INT

Rushing

- MCN – Cody Orgeron 2 ATT, 16 YDS
- UIW – Ra'Quanne Dickens 20 ATT, 69 YDS, 1 TD

Receiving

- MCN – Trevor Begue 6 REC, 72 YDS
- UIW – Phillip Baptiste 5 REC, 83 YDS, 2 TD

=== @ Nicholls State ===
Incarnate Word Cardinals at Nicholls State Colonels

| Quarter | 1 | 2 | 3 | 4 | Total |
|---|---|---|---|---|---|
| Cardinals | 7 | 0 | 7 | 7 | 21 |
| No. 20 Colonels | 21 | 17 | 7 | 3 | 48 |

at Manning Field at John L. Guidry Stadium, Thibodaux, Louisiana

- Date: October 27, 2018
- Game time: 3:00 p.m.
- Game weather: Temperature: 71 • Wind: NW 5 mph • Weather: Sunny and clear
- Game attendance: 8,061
- Referee: Cal McNeil
- TV announcers (SLC Digital): Bryant Johnson (play-by-play) & Seth Thomas (analyst)
- Box Score

Game information

First Quarter

- NSU – 14:41 Dontrell Taylor 66 yard run, Lorran Fonseca kick
  NSU 7–0 Drive: 1 play, 66 yards, 0:19
- NSU – 5:31 Jordan Talley 6 yard pass from Chase Fourcade, Lorran Fonseca kick
  NSU 14–0 Drive: 11 plays, 73 yards, 5:22
- NSU – 3:41 Jordan Talley 8 yard pass from Chase Fourcade, Lorran Fonseca kick
  NSU 21–0 Drive: 3 plays, 6 yards, 1:29
- UIW – 0:59 Phillip Baptiste 2 yard pass from Jon Copeland, Cody Seidel kick
  NSU 21–7 Drive: 9 plays, 87 yards, 2:42

Second Quarter

- NSU – 13:51 Gabe Fuselier 42 yard pass from Chase Fourcade, Lorran Fonseca kick
  NSU 28–7 Drive: 5 plays, 75 yards, 2:08
- NSU – 3:26 Lorran Fonseca 29 yard field goal
  NSU 31–7 Drive: 6 plays, 54 yards, 1:58
- NSU – 1:08 Chase Fourcade 10 yard run, Lorran Fonseca kick
  NSU 38–7 Drive: 4 plays, 89 yards, 1:18

Third Quarter

- NSU – 8:33 Damion Jeanpiere 48 yard pass from Chase Fourcade, Lorran Fonseca kick
  NSU 45–7 Drive: 2 plays, 56 yards, 0:24
- UIW – 4:54 Jaelin Campbell 0 yard fumble recovery, Cody Seidel kick
  NSU 45–14

Fourth Quarter

- NSU – 7:12 Lorran Fonseca 25 yard field goal
  NSU 48–14 Drive: 16 plays, 81 yards, 7:41
- UIW – 3:02 Jaelin Campbell 9 yard pass from Jon Copeland, Rhett Marshall kick
  NSU 48–21 Drive: 10 plays, 78 yards, 4:01

Passing

- UIW – Jon Copeland 32/47, 392 YDS, 3 TD
- NSU – Chase Fourcade 15/18, 266 YDS, 4 TD, 1 INT

Rushing

- UIW – Ameer King 12 ATT, 55 YDS
- NSU – Dontrell Taylor 6 ATT, 117 YDS, 1 TD

Receiving

- UIW – Ameer King 6 REC, 88 YDS
- NSU – Damion Jeanpiere 3 REC, 127 YDS, 1 TD

=== Sam Houston State ===
Sam Houston State Bearkats at Incarnate Word Cardinals

| Quarter | 1 | 2 | 3 | 4 | Total |
|---|---|---|---|---|---|
| No. 21 Bearkats | 10 | 3 | 7 | 6 | 26 |
| Cardinals | 6 | 10 | 27 | 0 | 43 |

at Gayle and Tom Benson Stadium, San Antonio, Texas

- Date: November 3, 2018
- Game time: 2:00 p.m.
- Game attendance: 5,643
- Referee: Christian Watso
- TV: ESPN3
- Box Score

Game information

First Quarter

- UIW – 9:09 Phillip Baptiste 22 yard pass from Jon Copeland, Cody Seidel kick failed
  UIW 6–0 Drive: 4 plays, 42 yards, 1:21
- SHSU – 4:03 Nathan Stewart 37 yard pass from Ty Brock, Tre Honshtein kick
  SHSU 7–6 Drive: 4 plays, 64 yards, 1:42
- SHSU – 0:31 Tre Honshtein 37 yard field goal
  SHSU 10–6 Drive: 6 plays, 22 yards, 2:12

Second Quarter

- SHSU – 9:13 Tre Honshtein 22 yard field goal
  SHSU 13–6 Drive: 7 plays, 9 yards, 2:29
- UIW – 1:54 Rhett Marshall 39 yard field goal
  SHSU 13–9 Drive: 8 plays, 78 yards, 2:26
- UIW – 1:33 Kody Edwards 30 yard pass from Jon Copeland, Cody Seidel kick
  UIW 16–13 Drive: 1 play, 30 yards, 0:09

Third Quarter

- UIW – 13:08 Kody Edwards 71 yard pass from Jon Copeland, Rhett Marshall kick
  UIW 23–13 Drive: 2 plays, 71 yards, 0:20
- SHSU – 12:57 Nathan Stewart 75 yard pass from Ty Brock, Tre Honshtein kick
  UIW 23–20 Drive: 1 play, 75 yards, 0:11
- UIW – 10:46 Javon Burse 46 yard fumble recovery, Rhett Marshall kick
  UIW 30–20
- UIW – 6:04 Ameer King 40 yard pass from Jon Copeland, Rhett Marshall kick failed
  UIW 36–20 Drive: 6 plays, 51 yards, 3:05
- UIW – 3:25 Ra'Quanne Dickens 2 yard run, Rhett Marshall kick
  UIW 43–20 Drive: 5 plays, 71 yards, 0:54

Fourth Quarter

- SHSU – 1:50 Dewaylon Ingram 7 yard pass from Mike Dare, Eric Schmid pass failed
  UIW 43–26 Drive: 13 plays, 78 yards, 4:11

Passing

- SHSU – Ty Brock 21/32, 284 YDS, 2 TD, 2 INT
- UIW – Jon Copeland 16/31, 324 YDS, 4 TD, 1 INT

Rushing

- SHSU – Kyran Jackson 20 ATT, 72 YDS
- UIW – Ra'Quanne Dickens 17 ATT, 73 YDS, 1 TD

Receiving

- SHSU – Nathan Stewart 7 REC, 157 YDS, 2 TD
- UIW – Kody Edwards 4 REC, 122 YDS, 2 TD

=== @ Central Arkansas ===
Incarnate Word Cardinals at Central Arkansas Bears

| Quarter | 1 | 2 | 3 | 4 | Total |
|---|---|---|---|---|---|
| Cardinals | 3 | 14 | 13 | 10 | 40 |
| Bears | 7 | 7 | 7 | 6 | 27 |

at Estes Stadium, Conway, Arkansas

- Date: November 10, 2018
- Game time: 3:00 p.m.
- Game weather: Temperature: 42 • Wind: E 5 mph • Weather: Clear
- Game attendance: 4,457
- Referee: Vidal Jones
- TV announcers (SLC Digital): Justin Acri (play-by-play), Chris Kane (analyst) & RJ Hawk (reporter)
- Box Score

Game information

First Quarter

- UCA – 9:41 Cedric Battle 32 yard pass from Luke Hales, Matt Cummins kick
  UCA 7–0 Drive: 4 plays, 95 yards, 1:49
- UIW – 6:24 Rhett Marshall 29 yard field goal
  UCA 7–3 Drive: 8 plays, 81 yards, 3:11

Second Quarter

- UCA – 13:42 Cedric Battle 32 yard pass from Luke Hales, Matt Cummins kick
  UCA 14–3 Drive: 1 plays, 32 yards, 0:08
- UIW – 9:45 Lamont Johnson 16 yard pass from Jon Copeland, Rhett Marshall kick
  UCA 14–10 Drive: 11 plays, 75 yards, 3:53
- UIW – 0:35 Phillip Baptiste 26 yard pass from Sean Brophy, Rhett Marshall kick
  UIW 17–14 Drive: 7 plays, 80 yards, 1:02

Third Quarter

- UIW – 13:06 Ra'Quanne Dickens 15 yard run, Rhett Marshall kick
  UIW 24–14 Drive: 7 plays, 65 yards, 1:54
- UIW – 7:46 Ra'Quanne Dickens 2 yard run, Rhett Marshall kick failed
  UIW 30–14 Drive: 10 plays, 70 yards, 4:00
- UCA – 1:14 Dwayne Smith 30 yard pass from Luke Hales, Matt Cummins kick
  UIW 30–21 Drive: 6 plays, 65 yards, 2:09

Fourth Quarter

- UIW – 11:14 Ra'Quanne Dickens 5 yard run, Rhett Marshall kick
  UIW 37–21 Drive: 2 plays, 7 yards, 0:54
- UCA – 8:57 Carlo Blackman 2 yard run, Carlo Blackman rush failed
  UIW 37–27 Drive: 4 plays, 31 yards, 2:06
- UIW – 2:52 Rhett Marshall 26 yard field goal
  UIW 40–27 Drive: 13 plays, 67 yards, 6:05

Passing

- UIW – Sean Brophy 14/20, 243 YDS, 1 TD
- UCA – Luke Hales 19/32, 319 YDS, 3 TD, 4 INT

Rushing

- UIW – Ra'Quanne Dickens 35 ATT, 213 YDS, 3 TD
- UCA – Kierre Crossley 8 ATT, 27 YDS

Receiving

- UIW – Phillip Baptiste 9 REC, 158 YDS, 1 TD
- UCA – Lester Wells 6 REC, 81 YDS

== FCS Playoffs ==
=== @ Montana State–First Round ===
FCS Playoffs First Round

| Quarter | 1 | 2 | 3 | 4 | Total |
|---|---|---|---|---|---|
| No. 24 Cardinals | 7 | 0 | 7 | 0 | 14 |
| No. 23 Bobcats | 7 | 11 | 3 | 14 | 35 |

at Bobcat Stadium, Bozeman, MT

- Date: November 24, 2018
- Game time: 2:00 p.m.
- Game weather: Temperature: 30 • Wind: NNW 15 mph • Weather: Cool, breezy
- Game attendance: 10,017
- Referee: J. Valentine
- TV: ESPN3
- Box Score

Game information

First Quarter

- MSU – 11:03 Lance McCutcheon 11 yard punt return, Tristan Bailey kick
  MSU 7–0
- UIW – 8:21 Jaelin Campbell 5 yard pass from Sean Brophy, Rhett Marshall kick
  Tied 7–7 Drive: 6 plays, 71 yards, 2:42

Second Quarter

- MSU – 11:28 Grant Collins 14 yard safety
  MSU 9–7
- MSU – 3:01 Tristan Bailey 35 yard field goal
  MSU 12–7 Drive: 9 plays, 39 yards, 4:22
- MSU – 0:26 Troy Andersen 1 yard run, Tristan Bailey kick failed
  MSU 18–7 Drive: 8 plays, 64 yards, 1:39

Third Quarter

- UIW – 12:31 Kody Edwards 33 yard pass from Sean Brophy
  MSU 18–14 Drive: 7 plays, 66 yards, 2:29
- MSU – 6:21 Tristan Bailey 19 yard field goal
  MSU 21–14 Drive: 13 plays, 64 yards, 6:10

Fourth Quarter

- MSU – 12:59 Travis Jonsen 19 yard run, Tristan Bailey kick
  MSU 28–14 Drive: 14 plays, 93 yards, 5:38
- MSU – 10:43 Travis Jonsen 37 yard pass from Troy Andersen, Tristan Bailey kick
  MSU 35–14 Drive: 5 plays, 59 yards, 1:37

Passing

- UIW – Sean Brophy 22/35, 313 YDS, 2 TD, 1 INT
- MSU – Troy Andersen 12/19, 164 YDS, 1 TD

Rushing

- UIW – Ra'Quanne Dickens 14 ATT, 63 YDS
- MSU – Isaiah Ifanse 30 ATT, 171 YDS

Receiving

- UIW – Kody Edwards 4 REC, 133 YDS 1 TD
- MSU – Travis Jonsen 2 REC, 76 YDS 1 TD

== Rankings ==
Ranking movements Legend: ██ Increase in ranking ██ Decrease in ranking — = Not ranked RV = Received votes
| | Week | | | | | | | | | | | | | |
| Poll | Pre | 1 | 2 | 3 | 4 | 5 | 6 | 7 | 8 | 9 | 10 | 11 | 12 | Final |
|---|---|---|---|---|---|---|---|---|---|---|---|---|---|---|
| STATS FCS | — | — | — | — | — | — | RV | — | RV | RV | RV | 24 | 24 | RV |
| Coaches | — | — | — | — | — | — | RV | — | RV | — | RV | RV | 25 | RV |
