= 2009 Incarnate Word Cardinals football team =

American college football season

2009 Incarnate Word Cardinals football
- Conference: Independent
- Record: 5–5
- Head coach: Mike Santiago (1st season)
- Offensive coordinator: Jim Marshall (1st season)
- Offensive scheme: Multiple
- Defensive coordinator: Todd Ivicic (1st season)
- Base defense: 4–2–5
- Home stadium: Gayle and Tom Benson Stadium

2009 NCAA Division II Super Region 4 independents football records
	Conf.			Overall
Team	W		L	W		L
Southwest Baptist		–		6	–	5
OK Panhandle State		–		5	–	6
Incarnate Word		–		4	–	5

The 2009 Incarnate Word Cardinals football team represented the University of the Incarnate Word in the 2009 NCAA Division II football season. They were led by first-year head coach Mike Santiago. The 2009 season was the inaugural season for UIW football and they competed as an NCAA Division II Independent, meaning they had no athletic conference affiliation in football for the season. Home games were played on campus at Gayle and Tom Benson Stadium. They finished the season 5–5 in their first season of intercollegiate play as a Division II Independent.

== TV and radio ==
All Incarnate Word games were broadcast on ESPN 1250 The Zone with the voices of Paul Alexander and Trey Ware. The weekly Mike Santiago Coach’s Show was also aired live by ESPN 1250 The Zone. Coach Santiago was heard each Thursday for 13 weeks of the season beginning at 7 p.m. KUIW Internet Radio carried all Cardinals football games live while KUIW TV streamed the games live as part of the simulcast.

== Schedule ==
Date	Time	Opponent	Site	Result	Attendance
August 29	7:00 pm	Monterrey Tech (ONEFA)	Gayle and Tom Benson Stadium; San Antonio, TX	W 42–39	6,325
September 5	6:00 pm	at Arkansas Tech	Thone Stadium at Buerkle Field; Russellville, AR	L 10–40	5,325
September 19	7:00 pm	No. 24 Midwestern State	Gayle and Tom Benson Stadium; San Antonio, TX	L 7–49	3,671
September 26	5:00 pm	at Langston (NAIA)	Anderson Stadium; Langston, OK	L 14–17	5,000
October 3	2:00 pm	at Oklahoma Panhandle State	Carl Wooten Field; Goodwell, OK	W 38–35 ^{OT}	788
October 10	2:00 pm	East Central	Gayle and Tom Benson Stadium; San Antonio, TX	W 38–20	1,864
October 17	2:00 pm	Texas Lutheran (D-III)	Gayle and Tom Benson Stadium; San Antonio, TX	W 53–18	2,934
October 24	2:00 pm	at Southwestern Assemblies of God (NAIA)	Lumpkins Stadium; Waxahachie, TX	W 37–34	1,200
October 31	2:00 pm	Southern Arkansas^{†}	Gayle and Tom Benson Stadium; San Antonio, TX	L 22–24	3,247
November 7	6:00 pm	at Eastern New Mexico	Greyhound Stadium; Portales, NM	L 30–35	2,316
^{†}Homecoming; Rankings from Coaches' Poll released prior to the game; All times are in Central time

== Personnel ==
=== Coaching staff ===
Name	Position	Alma mater	Joined staff
Mike Santiago	Head coach / Quarterbacks	Southern Utah (1977)	2007
Jim Marshall	Offensive coordinator / Offensive Line	UT Martin (1969)	2007
Todd Ivicic	Defensive coordinator / Linebackers / Special Teams	Sam Houston State (1991)	2007
Kyle Kennan	Director of football operations / Wide Receivers	Roger Williams (2001)	2007
Nick Debose	Defensive backs	Southeastern Oklahoma (2006)	2008
Brian Gamble	Defensive line	Texas A&M (2002)	2008
Caesar Martinez	Strength and conditioning Coach	Texas Tech	2008
Nick George	Graduate Assistant / Tight Ends / Fullbacks	Utah State (2006)	2008
Brendon Saul	Graduate Assistant / Cornerbacks	Texas State	2009
Johnny Walker	Volunteer Assistant / Defensive Backs	Texas	2009
Erik Flowers	Volunteer Assistant / Running Backs	Arizona State	2009
T.R. St. Charles	Head Football Athletic Trainer	Vanderbilt (1976)	2008

=== Roster ===
2009 Incarnate Word Cardinals Football
Quarterback: 2 Eric Massoni – (redshirt) freshman (6'2, 215); 9 Shane Knight – freshman (6'0, 180); 10 Paden Lynch – (redshirt) freshman (6'5, 205); 14 Chase Nickerson – freshman (6'1, 215); 15 Jerry Lopez – freshman (5'11, 185); 17 Thomas Specia – (redshirt) junior (6'3, 210); Running back: 21 Keith Brown – (redshirt) freshman (5'10, 175); 22 Trent Rios – (redshirt) freshman (5'8, 175); 30 Alex Torres – (redshirt) freshman (6'0, 195); 34 J.J. Johnson – sophomore (5'8, 185); 45 Elliot Hudson – freshman (5’10, 180); 47 Holden Rios – freshman (6'0, 175); Fullback: 43 Donald Gies – (redshirt) sophomore (6'0, 200); 44 Neal Jackson – (redshirt) freshman (5'11, 220); Wide receiver: 1 Robert Williams – (redshirt) freshman (5'8, 155); 3 Dominic Hamilton – (redshirt) freshman (5'9, 175); 4 Todd Walker – (redshirt) senior (6'3, 200); 5 Matt McLaren – (redshirt) sophomore (6'0, 180); 6 Derrick Walls – freshman (5'8, 160); 11 Austin Quinney – (redshirt) freshman (5'11, 190); 13 Mike Woods – (redshirt) sophomore (6'1, 172); 82 Jacob Love – (redshirt) sophomore (5'7, 165); 83 Kenneth Pryor – (redshirt) Sophomore (6'0, 170); 86 Carlos Laurel – freshman (6'1, 175); 87 Andrew Richter – freshman (5'11, 170); 89 Colton Palmer – freshman (6'4, 195)	Tight end: 42 Zach Behnsch – freshman (6'1, 205); 80 Andrew Mocio – (redshirt) freshman (6'5, 215); 81 Robert Anderson – freshman (6'1, 210); 84 Josh Busby – Sophomore (6'2, 245); 88 Caleb Kocian – (redshirt) Freshman (6'3, 240); 97 George DeRosa – (redshirt) freshman (6'0, 225); Offensive line: 54 Patrick Martinez – C – (redshirt) freshman (6'0, 255); 57 Jake Roby – OT – (redshirt) freshman (6'6, 260); 60 Jon Gallegos – C – freshman (6'0, 255); 61 Andy Seaman – OG – freshman (6'2, 270); 64 Klayton Smith – OG – freshman (6'2, 280); 67 Charles Segura – OG – (redshirt) Sophomore (6'2, 295); 68 Michael Palacios – OG – (redshirt) Freshman (6'5, 340); 69 Mathew Atwell – OT – (redshirt) Sophomore (6'4, 270); 73 Jeremy Fields – OG – (redshirt) Freshman (6'1, 295); 74 Eric Salas – OG – freshman (6'1, 275); 76 Jayson Hierholzer – OT – (redshirt) freshman (6'4, 285); 79 Tim Kudla – OT – (redshirt) sophomore (6'4, 265); Defensive line: 52 Alan Ford – DE – (redshirt) freshman (6'5, 210); 55 Brandon Terry – DT – freshman (5'10, 270); 58 Brandon Fraser – DE – Junior (6'2, 240); 63 Joseph Roberson – DT – freshman (6'0, 265); 65 Anthony Vela – DT – freshman (6'0, 270); 70 Steve Burgamy – DT – (redshirt) sophomore (5'11, 260); 71 Robby Horton – DT – freshman (6'2, 265); 85 Zach Zellars – DE – Freshman (6'2, 240); 90 Chad Miles – DE – (redshirt) freshman (6'4, 231); 91 Herman Torres – DE – (redshirt) junior (6'0, 230); 92 Chaz Cobb – DE – freshman (6'1, 210); 93 Randy Enriquez – DE – (redshirt) junior (6'0, 255); 95 Marcus McKenzie – DT – (redshirt) freshman (6'0, 270); 98 Diego McClain – DT – (redshirt) sophomore (6'2, 260); 99 Ty Warnasch – DT – (redshirt) freshman (6'3, 300)	Linebacker: 33 Dakota Mawyer – (redshirt) freshman (6'3, 250); 35 Tyler Fields – (redshirt) freshman (6'0, 235); 38 Josh Boone – (redshirt) junior (6'3, 230); 40 Rashaad Patterson – freshman (5'10, 210); 46 Chris Vargas – (redshirt) freshman (5'9, 215); 50 Trey Marquez – (redshirt) freshman (5'11, 215); 51 Daniel Soto – (redshirt) senior (6'1, 233); 53 Samuel Weisman – freshman (6'0, 205); 56 Jerry Sealey – (redshirt) Sophomore (5'11, 220); Defensive back: 7 Chaz Pavliska – S – (redshirt) freshman (5'11, 210); 8 Matt Sanders – CB – (redshirt) freshman (5'9, 150); 16 Mat Garza – CB – freshman (5'8, 150); 19 James Perez – CB – (redshirt) freshman (5'11, 155); 20 Ross Bishop – CB – freshman (5'9, 165); 23 Aaron Hernandez – S – (redshirt) sophomore (6'0, 185); 24 Trey Mumme – S – (redshirt) freshman (5'11, 175); 25 Devan Avery – CB – (redshirt) freshman (5'10, 160); 26 Todd Lyons – S – freshman (5'11, 195); 27 Aaron Willis – S – (redshirt) freshman (6'3, 210); 28 Ephraim Banda – S – (redshirt) junior (5'9, 190); 29 Antoine Banks – CB – freshman (5'9, 170); 31 Jesson Gil – CB – freshman (5'10, 165); 32 Larry Cruz – CB – (redshirt) junior (6'0, 180); 36 Anthony Stokes – S – freshman (5'11, 190); 37 Aaron Stokes – S – freshman (5'11, 190); 41 Ricky Rodriguez – CB – freshman (5'11, 175); Special teams: 39 Saul Meza – K – (redshirt) freshman (5'9, 160); 49 Thomas Rebold – K/P – (redshirt) sophomore (5'10, 175)

== Depth chart ==
Defense

S
27 Aaron Willis, Fr
23 Aaron Hernandez, So
⋅

FS
26 Todd Lyons, Fr
24 Trey Mumme, Fr
28 Ephraim Banda, Jr

WLB	SLB
35 Tyler Fields, Fr	33 Dakota Mawyer, Fr
40 Rashaad Patterson, Fr	51 Daniel Soto, Jr
56 Jerry Sealey, Fr	53 Samuel Weisman, Fr

SS
7 Chaz Pavliska, Fr
36 Anthony Stokes, Fr
37 Aaron Stokes, Fr

CB
25 Devan Avery, Fr
19 James Perez, Fr
32 Larry Cruz, Jr

DE	DT	DT	DE
52 Alan Ford, Fr	98 Diego McClain, So	99 Ty Warnasch, Fr	85 Zach Zellars, Fr
93 Randy Enriquez, Jr	70 Steve Burgamy, So	90 Chad Miles, Fr	91 Herman Torres, Jr
95 Marcus McKenzie, Fr	⋅	65 Anthony Vela, Fr	⋅

CB
8 Matt Sanders, Fr
31 Jesson Gil, Fr
16 Mat Garza, Fr

Offense

WR
3 Dominic Hamilton, Fr
6 Derrick Walls, Fr
82 Jacob Love, So

LT	LG	C	RG	RT
57 Jake Roby, Fr	68 Michael Palacios, Fr	54 Patrick Martinez, Fr	67 Charles Segura, Fr	76 Jayson Hierholzer, Fr
69 Mathew Atwell, So	74 Eric Salas, Fr	60 John Gallegos, Fr	61 Andy Seaman, Fr	79 Tim Kudla, So
⋅	⋅	⋅	⋅	⋅

TE
80 Andrew Mocio, Fr
88 Caleb Kocian, Fr
84 Jake Busby, So

WR
4 Todd Walker, Sr
5 Matt McLaren, So
83 Kenneth Pryor, So

QB
17 Thomas Specia, Jr
2 Eric Massoni, Fr
10 Paden Lynch, Fr

RB
22 Trent Rios, Fr
34 J.J. Johnson, So
30 Alex Torres, Fr

FB
43 Donald Gies, So
44 Neal Jackson, Fr
⋅

Special teams
PK 49 Thomas Rebold, So
PK 39 Saul Meza, Fr
P 49 Thomas Rebold, So
P 27 Aaron Willis, Fr
KR 82 Jacob Love, So
PR 6 Derrick Walls, Fr
LS 70 Steve Burgamy, So
H 3 Dominic Hamilton, Fr

== Game summaries ==
=== Monterrey Tech ===
Monterrey Tech at Incarnate Word

Team	1	2	3	4	Total
Borregos Salvajes	10	7	0	22	39
• Cardinals	14	14	7	7	42

- Date: August 29
- Location: Gayle and Tom Benson Stadium
  San Antonio, TX
- Game start: 7:00 p.m. CST
- Elapsed time: 3:30
- Game attendance: 6,325
- Game weather: 85 °F (29 °C) • NE 5–10 mph (8.0–16.1 km/h) • Partly cloudy, warm
- Referee: Kenny Kalergis
Sources: Box Score

Scoring summary
1	11:21	Monterrey Tech	Lomeli-Medelin 19 yard field goal, Drive: 8 plays, 23 yards, 3:27	0–3
1	9:10	Incarnate Word	Thomas Specia 52 yard run (Saul Meza kick), Drive: 7 plays, 71 yards, 2:06	7–3
1	7:51	Incarnate Word	Kenneth Pryor 42 yard pass from Thomas Specia (Saul Meza kick), Drive: 1 play, 42 yards, 0:07	14–3
1	2:19	Monterrey Tech	Castelan-Uresty 1 yard run (Lomeli-Medelin kick), Drive: 12 plays, 64 yards, 5:23	14–10
2	11:36	Monterrey Tech	Reyes-Conn 1 yard run (Lomeli-Medelin kick), Drive: 7 plays, 68 yards, 2:51	14–17
2	6:50	Incarnate Word	Derrick Walls 25 yard pass from Thomas Specia (Saul Meza kick), Drive: 9 plays, 80 yards, 4:40	21–17
2	4:42	Incarnate Word	Paden Lynch 1 yard run (Saul Meza kick), Drive: 2 plays, 11 yards, 0:25	28–17
3	0:35	Incarnate Word	Thomas Specia 2 yard run (Saul Meza kick), Drive: 8 plays, 78 yards, 5:16	35–17
4	14:36	Monterrey Tech	Castelan-Uresty 22 yard run (Lomeli-Medelin kick), Drive: 3 plays, 46 yards, 0:51	35–24
4	7:47	Incarnate Word	Derrick Walls 36 yard pass from Thomas Specia (Saul Meza kick), Drive: 4 plays, 51 yards, 2:05	42–24
4	7:32	Monterrey Tech	Castelan-Uresty 92 yard kickoff return (Lomeli-Medelin kick)	42–31
4	3:34	Monterrey Tech	Magallanes-Alns 3 yard run (Castelan-Uresty rush), Drive: 5 plays, 81 yards, 1:38	42–39

=== @ Arkansas Tech ===
Incarnate Word at Arkansas Tech

Team	1	2	3	4	Total
Cardinals	3	0	7	0	10
• Wonder Boys	24	10	6	0	40

- Date: September 5
- Location: Thone Stadium
  Russellville, AR
- Game start: 6:00 p.m. CST
- Elapsed time: 2:50
- Game attendance: 5,325
- Game weather: 79 °F (26 °C) • ESE 4 mph (6.4 km/h) • Mostly cloudy, humid
- Referee: Pat Smith
Sources: Box Score

Scoring summary
1	11:17	Arkansas Tech	Lance Williams 15 yard pass from Nick Graziano (Travis Cockerham kick), Drive: 10 play, 65 yards, 3:43	0–7
1	9:25	Incarnate Word	Thomas Rebold 43 yard field goal, Drive: 5 plays, 57 yards, 1:45	3–7
1	9:11	Arkansas Tech	Frantz Simeon 88 yard kickoff return (Travis Cockerham kick)	3–14
1	5:16	Arkansas Tech	Travis Cockerham 34 yard field goal, Drive: 5 plays, 51 yards, 1:47	3–17
1	3:33	Arkansas Tech	Cody Burns 45 yard run (Travis Cockerham kick), Drive: 4 plays, 57 yards, 0:30	3–24
2	13:43	Arkansas Tech	Nick Graziano 2 yard run (Travis Cockerham kick), Drive: 8 plays, 63 yards, 3:34	3–31
2	5:39	Arkansas Tech	Travis Cockerham 18 yard field goal, Drive: 10 plays, 77 yards, 5:26	3–34
3	6:19	Arkansas Tech	T.J. Langley 11 yard pass from Robert Sagerian (Matt Johnston kick failed), Drive: 10 plays, 59 yards, 5:57	3–40
3	0:45	Incarnate Word	Todd Walker 14 yard pass from Thomas Specia (Thomas Rebold kick), Drive: 10 plays, 77 yards, 5:32	10–40

=== Midwestern State ===
Midwestern State at Incarnate Word

Team	1	2	3	4	Total
• #24 Mustangs	7	14	7	21	49
Cardinals	0	0	7	0	7

- Date: September 19
- Location: Gayle and Tom Benson Stadium
  San Antonio, TX
- Game start: 7:00 p.m. CST
- Elapsed time: 3:10
- Game attendance: 3,671
- Game weather: 75 °F (24 °C) • NE 5–10 mph (8.0–16.1 km/h) • Calm, partly cloudy
- Referee: Larry Clemens
Sources: Box Score

Scoring summary
1	5:14	Midwestern State	Andy Tanner 80 yard pass from Zack Eskridge (Jose Martinez kick), Drive: 1 play, 80 yards, 0:13	0–7
2	12:31	Midwestern State	Sasan Faradineh 5 yard pass from Zack Eskridge (Jose Martinez kick), Drive: 5 plays, 70 yards, 1:36	0–14
2	0:56	Midwestern State	Andy Tanner 33 yard pass from Zack Eskridge (Jose Martinez kick), Drive: 1 play, 33 yards, 0:08	0–21
3	11:08	Incarnate Word	Todd Walker 11 yard pass from Thomas Specia (Thomas Rebold kick), Drive: 11 plays, 70 yards, 3:45	7–21
3	8:29	Midwestern State	Andy Tanner 26 yard pass from Zack Eskridge (Jose Martinez kick), Drive: 6 plays, 48 yards, 2:34	7–28
4	9:43	Midwestern State	BeeJay Mathis 2 yard run (Lee Scott kick), Drive: 8 plays, 36 yards, 3:31	7–35
4	5:02	Midwestern State	Ben McMahan 6 yard run (Lee Scott kick), Drive: 7 plays, 65 yards, 3:18	7–42
4	3:16	Midwestern State	Brandon Minor 8 yard run (Lee Scott kick), Drive: 1 play, 8 yards, 0:00	7–49

=== @ Langston ===
Incarnate Word at Langston

Team	1	2	3	4	Total
Cardinals	0	7	7	0	14
• Lions	0	0	0	17	17

- Date: September 26
- Location: Anderson Stadium
  Langston, OK
- Game start: 5:00 p.m. CST
- Elapsed time: 3:30
- Game attendance: 5,000
Sources: Box Score

Scoring summary
2	0:41	Incarnate Word	Trent Rios 28 yard pass from Thomas Specia (Thomas Rebold kick), Drive: 6 plays, 73 yards, 0:09	7–0
3	9:54	Incarnate Word	Todd Walker 41 yard pass from Eric Massoni (Thomas Rebold kick), Drive: 3 plays, 42 yards, 1:26	14–0
4	13:32	Langston	5 yard run (kick), Drive: 10 plays, 51 yards, 4:57	14–7
4	5:47	Langston	29 yard field goal, Drive: 11 plays, 52 yards, 5:58	14–10
4	2:25	Langston	23 yard run (kick), Drive: 5 plays, 51 yards, 1:52	14–17

=== @ Oklahoma Panhandle State ===
Incarnate Word at Oklahoma Panhandle State

Team	1	2	3	4	OT	Total
• Cardinals	0	7	14	14	3	38
Aggies	14	7	14	0	0	35

- Date: October 3
- Location: Carl Wooten Stadium
  Goodwell, OK
- Game start: 2:00 p.m. CST
- Elapsed time: 3:45
- Game attendance: 788
Sources: Box Score

Scoring summary
1	7:54	OPSU	65 yard run (kick), Drive: 6 plays, 94 yards, 3:24	0–7
1	1:34	OPSU	12 yard pass (kick)	0–14
2	6:27	Incarnate Word	Caleb Kocian 4 yard pass from Thomas Specia (Thomas Rebold kick), Drive: 5 plays, 30 yards, 2:43	7–14
2	1:54	OPSU	8 yard run (kick), Drive: 7 plays, 66 yards, 4:33	7–21
3	11:32	OPSU	82 yard run (kick), Drive: 1 play, 82 yards, 0:13	7–28
3	8:03	OPSU	18 yard pass (kick), Drive: 6 plays, 27 yards, 2:57	7–35
3	6:01	Incarnate Word	J.J. Johnson 1 yard run (Thomas Rebold kick), Drive: 5 plays, 49 yards, 2:02	14–35
3	0:12	Incarnate Word	Eric Massoni 2 yard run (Thomas Rebold kick), Drive: 8 plays, 63 yards, 2:53	21–35
4	3:49	Incarnate Word	Dominic Hamilton 29 yard pass from Eric Massoni (Thomas Rebold kick), Drive: 2 plays, 46 yards, 0:09	28–35
4	1:10	Incarnate Word	Dominic Hamilton 12 yard pass from Eric Massoni (Thomas Rebold kick), Drive: 3 plays, 20 yards, 0:49	35–35
OT	15:00	Incarnate Word	Thomas Rebold 39 yard field goal, Drive: 4 plays, 3 yards, 0:00	38–35

=== East Central ===
East Central at Incarnate Word

Team	1	2	3	4	Total
Tigers	0	6	0	14	20
• Cardinals	0	14	7	17	38

- Date: October 14
- Location: Gayle and Tom Benson Stadium
  San Antonio, TX
- Game start: 2:00 p.m. CST
- Elapsed time: 2:55
- Game attendance: 1,864
- Game weather: 56 °F (13 °C) • 5–10 mph (8.0–16.1 km/h) • Cool temps, overcast
- Referee: Charlie Wernett
Sources: Box Score

Scoring summary
2	11:08	East Central	Josh Maldonado 40 yard run (Bryson Hall kick failed), Drive: 5 plays, 63 yards, 2:05	0–6
2	9:26	Incarnate Word	Dominic Hamilton 58 yard pass from Eric Massoni (Thomas Rebold kick), Drive: 4 plays, 71 yards, 1:36	7–6
2	8:26	Incarnate Word	Aaron Hernandez 43 yard fumble recovery (Thomas Rebold kick)	14–6
3	1:14	Incarnate Word	Matt McLaren 20 yard pass from Eric Massoni (Thomas Rebold kick), Drive: 1 play, 20 yards, 0:06	21–6
4	11:55	Incarnate Word	Thomas Rebold 36 yard field goal, Drive: 7 plays, 45 yards, 2:58	24–6
4	10:16	East Central	Zack Patteson 34 yard pass from Josh Phillips (Josh Phillips pass failed), Drive: 4 plays, 61 yards, 1:31	24–12
4	4:39	Incarnate Word	Dominic Hamilton 30 yard pass from Eric Massoni (Thomas Rebold kick), Drive: 8 plays, 73 yards, 5:31	31–12
4	3:29	Incarnate Word	Alan Ford 54 yard fumble recovery (Thomas Rebold kick)	38–12
4	2:24	East Central	Zack Patteson 34 yard pass from Josh Phillips (Zack Patteson pass from Josh Phillips), Drive: 6 plays, 63 yards, 0:58	38–20

=== Texas Lutheran ===
Texas Lutheran at Incarnate Word

Team	1	2	3	4	Total
Bulldogs	0	0	2	16	18
• Cardinals	14	18	14	7	53

- Date: October 17
- Location: Gayle and Tom Benson Stadium
  San Antonio, TX
- Game start: 2:00 p.m. CST
- Elapsed time: 2:55
- Game attendance: 2,934
- Game weather: 72 °F (22 °C) • NE 5–10 mph (8.0–16.1 km/h) • Sunny skies
- Referee: John Belcher
Sources: Box Score

Scoring summary
1	10:00	Incarnate Word	Alex Torres 8 yard pass from Eric Massoni (Thomas Rebold kick), Drive: 8 plays, 70 yards, 3:22	7–0
1	5:25	Incarnate Word	Todd Walker 46 yard pass from Eric Massoni (Thomas Rebold kick), Drive: 6 plays, 77 yards, 3:06	14–0
2	6:08	Incarnate Word	Team Safety	16–0
2	4:45	Incarnate Word	Dominic Hamilton 41 yard pass from Thomas Specia (Thomas Rebold kick), Drive: 3 plays, 52 yards, 1:18	23–0
2	3:00	Incarnate Word	Robert Williams 15 yard blocked punt return (Thomas Rebold kick failed)	29–0
2	0:14	Incarnate Word	Saul Meza 39 yard field goal, Drive: 7 plays, 28 yards, 2:23	32–0
3	11:36	Incarnate Word	Dominic Hamilton 38 yard pass from Eric Massoni (Saul Meza kick), Drive: 6 plays, 59 yards, 3:16	39–0
3	8:38	Texas Lutheran	Team Safety	39–2
3	3:37	Incarnate Word	J.J. Johnson 28 yard pass from Paden Lynch (Saul Meza kick), Drive: 5 plays, 80 yards, 2:32	46–2
4	11:16	Texas Lutheran	Quinnten Cleveland 5 yard run (Quinnten Cleveland pass from Jarret Buchholtz), Drive: 3 plays 50 yards, 0:45	46–10
4	3:19	Incarnate Word	Keith Brown 16 yard run (Saul Meza kick), Drive: 15 plays, 82 yards, 7:48	53–10
4	0:52	Texas Lutheran	Jonathon Randle 11 yard pass from Jarret Buchholtz (Jonathon Randle pass from Jarret Buchholtz), Drive: 9 plays, 64 yards, 2:19	53–18

=== @ Southwestern Assemblies of God ===
Incarnate Word at Southwestern Assemblies of God

Team	1	2	3	4	Total
• Cardinals	13	14	7	3	37
Lions	7	14	7	6	34

- Date: October 24
- Location: Lumpkins Stadium
  Waxahachie, TX
- Game start: 2:00 p.m. CST
- Elapsed time: 3:45
- Game attendance: 1,200
- Game weather: Cool and windy
Sources: Box Score

Scoring summary
1
2
3
4

=== Southern Arkansas ===
Southern Arkansas at Incarnate Word

Team	1	2	3	4	Total
• Muleriderrs	7	3	14	0	24
Cardinals	12	3	0	7	22

- Date: October 31, 2009
- Location: Benson Stadium
  San Antonio, TX
- Game start: 2:00 p.m. CST
- Elapsed time: 3:00
- Game attendance: 3,247
- Game weather: 72 °F (22 °C) • NNE 7 mph (11 km/h) • Clear skies
- Referee: Don Wenzel
Sources: Box Score

Scoring summary
1	8:20	Incarnate Word	Eric Massoni 1 yard run (Dominic Hamilton rush failed), Drive: 13 plays, 60 yards, 6:40	6–0
1	2:01	Southern Arkansas	Travarus Brown 38 yard pass from Austin Civita (Noe’ Cuevas kick), Drive: 2 plays, 43 yards, 0:46	6–7
1	0:04	Incarnate Word	Kenneth Pryor 13 yard pass from Eric Massoni (Eric Massoni rush failed), Drive: 5 plays, 25 yards, 1:43	12–7
2	1:37	Incarnate Word	Thomas Rebold 29 yard field goal, Drive: 4 plays, 5 yards, 1:01	15–7
2	0:00	Southern Arkansas	Noe’ Cuevas 27 yard field goal, Drive: 9 plays, 61 yards, 1:31	15–10
3	13:25	Southern Arkansas	Chris Metcalf 35 yard run (Noe’ Cuevas kick), Drive: 5 plays, 62 yards, 1:29	15–17
3	5:56	Southern Arkansas	Travarus Brown 3 yard pass from Austin Civita (Noe’ Cuevas kick), Drive: 3 plays, 10 yards, 1:19	15–24
4	2:18	Incarnate Word	Diego McClain 83 yard interception return (Thomas Rebold kick)	22–24

=== @ Eastern New Mexico ===
Incarnate Word at Eastern New Mexico

Team	1	2	3	4	Total
Cardinals	0	20	3	7	30
• Greyhounds	14	15	0	6	35

- Date: November 7
- Location: Greyhound Stadium
  Blackwater Draw, NM
- Game start: 6:00 p.m. CST
- Elapsed time: 3:15
- Game attendance: 2,316
- Game weather: 65 °F (18 °C) • NW 10 mph (16 km/h) • Clear skies, cool
- Referee: Mark Hughes
Sources: Box Score

Scoring summary
1	11:14	Eastern New Mexico	Arvin Jackson 6 yard pass from J.J. Harp (Taylor Cannon kick), Drive: 8 plays, 49 yards, 1:50	0–7
1	4:26	Eastern New Mexico	Dominic Preston 6 yard pass from J.J. Harp (Taylor Cannon kick), Drive: 11 plays, 91 yards, 2:24	0–14
2	12:00	Incarnate Word	Todd Walker 18 yard pass from Thomas Specia (Thomas Rebold kick), Drive: 1 play, 18 yards, 0:06	7–14
2	8:37	Incarnate Word	Todd Walker 23 yard pass from Thomas Specia (Thomas Rebold kick), Drive: 4 plays, 35 yards, 1:30	14–14
2	6:52	Eastern New Mexico	Stefan Mills 2 yard pass from J.J. Harp (Taylor Cannon kick), Drive: 6 plays, 58 yards, 1:31	14–21
2	3:35	Incarnate Word	J.J. Johnson 3 yard run (Thomas Rebold kick failed), Drive: 1 plays, 3 yards, 0:05	20–21
2	0:17	Eastern New Mexico	Arvin Jackson 19 yard pass from J.J. Harp (Devin Sweet pass from Wesley Wood), Drive: 5 plays, 77 yards, 0:47	20–29
3	10:29	Incarnate Word	Thomas Rebold 32 yard field goal, Drive: 4 plays, 3 yards, 1:01	23–29
4	13:27	Incarnate Word	J.J. Johnson 4 yard run (Thomas Rebold kick), Drive: 7 plays, 68 yards, 4:14	30–29
4	1:53	Eastern New Mexico	Darian Dale 8 yard pass from Wesley Wood (Wesley Wood pass failed), Drive: 6 plays, 94 yards, 1:20	30–35
