= Ivičić =

Ivičić is a South Slavic-language surname. Notable people with the surname include:

- Martin Ivičič (born 1976), Slovak ice hockey player
- Todd Ivicic, American college football coach
- Tomislav Ivičić, Croatian footballer
