= Sean Brophy =

American football coach and former player

Current position
- Title: Offensive coordinator & quarterbacks coach
- Team: Oklahoma State
- Conference: Big 12

Biographical details
- Born: c. 1997 (age 28–29); Phoenix, Arizona, U.S.

Playing career
- 2015–2016: Glendale CC
- 2017–2019: Incarnate Word
- Position: Quarterback

Coaching career (HC unless noted)
- 2021: Incarnate Word (QC)
- 2022: Washington State (GA)
- 2023–2024: North Texas (QB)
- 2025: North Texas (PGC/QB)
- 2026–present: Oklahoma State (OC/QB)

Sean Brophy (born c. 1997) is an American football coach who is currently the offensive coordinator for the Oklahoma State Cowboys.

== Playing career ==
Brophy started his college career at Glendale Community College before transferring to Incarnate Word. During his time at Incarnate Word from 2017 to 2019, he completed 176 of his 300 pass attempts for 1,854 yards and 14 touchdowns.

== Coaching career ==
Brophy got his first coaching job in 2021 at his alma mater, Incarnate Word, as a quality control coach. In 2022, he joined Washington State as a graduate assistant. Ahead of the 2023 season, Brophy was hired as the quarterbacks coach for North Texas. Ahead of the 2025 season, he added passing game coordinator to his responsibilities. On December 18, 2025, Brophy was hired as the offensive coordinator and quarterbacks coach at Oklahoma State.
