= Joseph Zema =

Australian gridiron football player (born 1994)

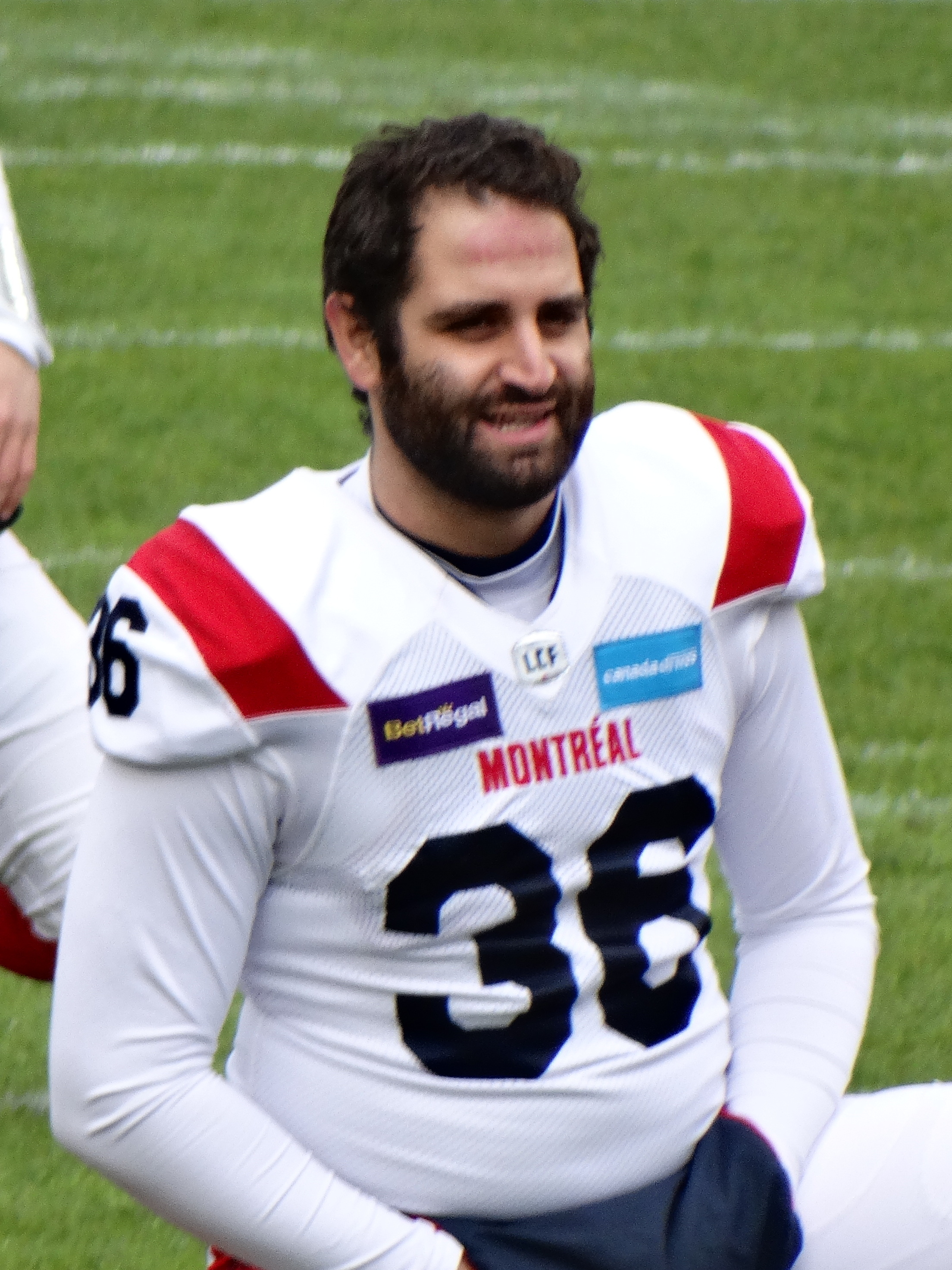
- Zema with the Montreal Alouettes in 2022

No. 36 – Montreal Alouettes
- Position: Punter
- Roster status: Active
- CFL status: Global

Personal information
- Born: 10 August 1994 (age 32); Melbourne, Victoria, Australia
- Listed height: 6 ft 0 in (1.83 m)
- Listed weight: 224 lb (102 kg)

Career information
- High school: Whitefriars
- College: Incarnate Word
- CFL draft: 2021G: 1st round, 6th overall pick

Career history
- San Antonio Commanders (2019); Montreal Alouettes (2021–present)

Awards and highlights
- Grey Cup champion (2023); CFL East All-Star (2025)

Career CFL statistics as of 2026
- Punts: 562
- Punting yards: 26,374
- Punting average: 46.9
- Longest punt: 69
- Inside 20: 46
- Stats at CFL.ca

Joseph Zema (born 10 August 1994) is an Australian professional gridiron football punter for the Montreal Alouettes of the Canadian Football League (CFL).

== College career ==
Zema played college football for the Incarnate Word Cardinals in 2017 as a graduate transfer from Australian Catholic University.

== Professional career ==
Pre-draft measurables
Height	Weight	Arm length	Hand span	Wingspan
6 ft 0 1/8 in (1.83 m)	209 lb (95 kg)	32 1/4 in (0.82 m)	8 1/4 in (0.21 m)	6 ft 2 3/4 in (1.90 m)
All values from Pro Day

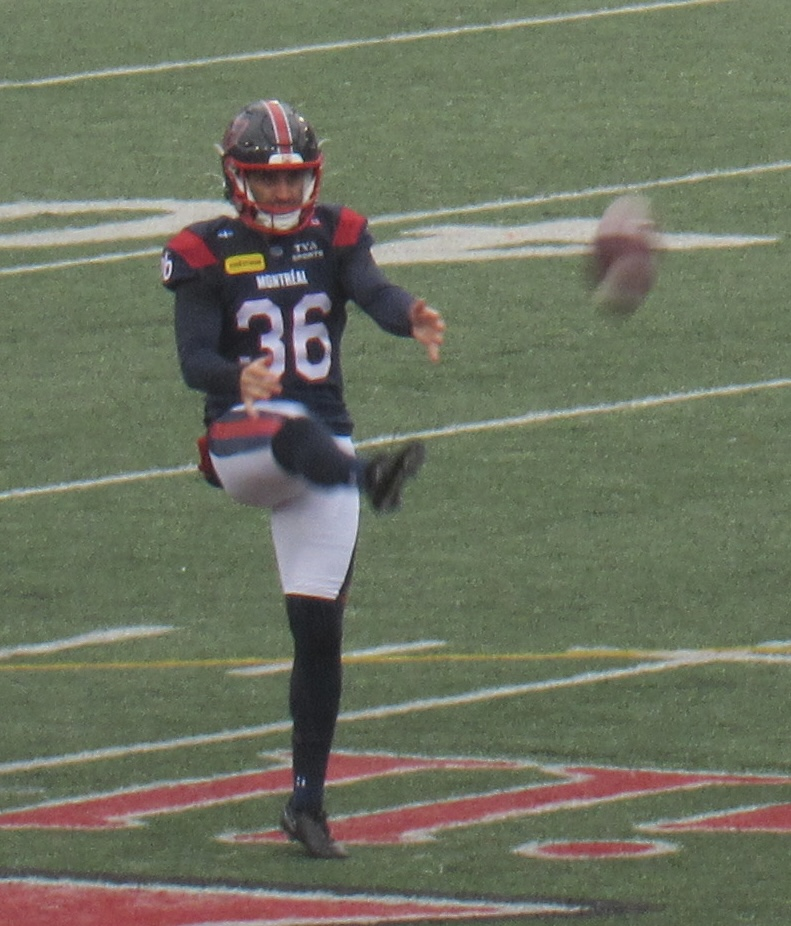
Zema punting for the Alouettes in 2025

=== San Antonio Commanders ===
Following his college career, Zema had tryouts with the National Football League's New York Jets, Tampa Bay Buccaneers, Jacksonville Jaguars, but was not signed. Instead, he signed with the San Antonio Commanders of the Alliance of American Football in 2019 where he had 37 punts with a 45.8-yard average. His contract was terminated following the dissolution of the league on 2 April 2019.

=== Montreal Alouettes ===
Zema was declared eligible for the 2021 CFL global draft where he was drafted sixth overall by the Montreal Alouettes. He then signed with the team on 8 June 2021. He earned the job as the team's punter following training camp and played in all 14 regular season games where he punted 90 times with a 45.2-yard average.

In 2022, Zema continued his strong play where he played in all 18 regular season games and had 85 punts with a 47.3-yard average.

== Personal life ==
Zema was born in Melbourne, Victoria, to parents Nick and Antonietta Zema. He has one brother, Matthew.
