= Ephraim Banda =

American football player and coach (born 1981)

Cleveland Browns
- Title: Defensive passing game coordinator

Personal information
- Born: November 1, 1981 (age 45); San Antonio, Texas, U.S.
- Listed height: 5 ft 9 in (1.75 m)
- Listed weight: 190 lb (86 kg)

Career information
- Position: Safety
- High school: William Howard Taft (San Antonio)
- College: Incarnate Word

Career history
- Incarnate Word (2011) Student assistant; Texas (2012–2014) Graduate assistant; Mississippi State (2015) Defensive quality control coach; Miami (FL) (2016–2018) Safeties coach; Miami (FL) (2019–2020) Co-defensive coordinator & safeties coach; Utah State (2021–2022) Defensive coordinator & safeties coach; Cleveland Browns (2023–present); Safeties coach (2023–2025); Defensive passing game coordinator (2026–present)

Ephraim Banda (born November 1, 1981) is an American football coach who is the defensive pass game coordinator for the Cleveland Browns of the National Football League (NFL).

== Playing career ==
Banda played safety at Incarnate Word from 2008 to 2010, where he joined the newly created football program as a 25-year old walk-on and was named the special teams captain in the program's first career game.

== Coaching career ==
Banda has been with the Cleveland Browns under defensive coordinator Jim Schwartz since the 2023 season, after spending over a decade in the collegiate ranks. This season, the Browns finished 4th in the NFL in total defense (283.6 yards per game) and 3rd in passing defense (167.2 yards per game). Safeties Ronnie Hickman and Grant Delpit combined for 192 tackles and Delpit registered three sacks, the most by a safety in team history and the most by a Browns' defensive back since 1989.

In 2023, the Browns defense led the NFL in several categories including total defense (270.2 yards per game), passing defense (164.7 yards per game), third down percentage (67-of-230 for 29.1 percent) and first downs allowed (253). The team's 270.2 net yards allowed per game were the fewest allowed in the NFL since the 2014 Seahawks (2671) and the fewest allowed by a Browns team since 1957. Cleveland also led the league by forcing 112 punts, the third-most forced by an NFL team since 1970.Ephraim Banda Bio

Banda came to the Browns from Utah State where he served as the Defensive Coordinator for two seasons. In both seasons, the Aggies ranked Top 10 nationally in tackles for loss. Under Banda's guidance, in 2022, Utah State's defense held each of its final three opponents to 13 or fewer points, doing so for the first time since 1983, and five of its last six opponents to 17 or fewer points. Additionally, Utah State's defense finished tied for second in the nation with 114.0 tackles for loss, which is also tied for the second-most in school history. And, USU limited its opponents to just 22 touchdowns on 51 trips into the red zone (.431), which ranked 10th nationally. Banda’s defense helped the Aggies to a Mountain West Championship in 2021

Prior to his first coordinator opportunity, Banda spent five seasons under Mark Richt and Manny Diaz at Miami, his first three seasons (2016-18) as safeties coach before serving as co-defensive coordinator/safeties coach from 2019-20. During his tenure at Miami, he coached nine defensive backs that went on to the NFL. In his last two recruiting cycles at Miami, Banda landed the No. 1-ranked safety in the nation and was named one of the top-25 recruiters in the country by Rivals.com.

Banda spent the 2015 season as a defensive assistant at Mississippi State, helping the Bulldogs to a 9-4 record and victory against North Carolina State in the Belk Bowl. The Bulldogs' defensive unit held opponents to just 23.2 points per game and ranked in the nation's top 10 in red zone defense. In addition, MSU led the nation in fewest pass plays of 20-plus yards allowed with 24.

After suffering a knee injury that ended his playing career, Banda stayed with the Cardinals football program as a student assistant while he completed his degree. He was named a graduate assistant at Texas in 2012 behind the recommendation of a former Incarnate Word coach who was hired at Texas. While at Texas, he developed a close relationship with Longhorns defensive coordinator Manny Diaz, as they both got their first jobs outside of coaching. He stayed with the program as they transitioned from Mack Brown to Charlie Strong before joining Diaz at Mississippi State as a defensive quality control coach.

=== Miami (FL) ===
Banda followed Diaz to Miami, where he was named the safeties coach in 2016. After Diaz left briefly to accept the head coaching position at Temple, Banda was promoted to co-defensive coordinator.

=== Utah State ===
Banda was named the defensive coordinator and safeties coach at Utah State on January 5, 2021.

=== Cleveland Browns ===
On February 21, 2023, Banda was hired to be the Cleveland Browns safeties coach under defensive coordinator Jim Schwartz. On February 20, 2026, it was reported that Banda would be promoted to defensive passing game coordinator and safeties coach.

== Personal life ==
Banda and his wife Crystal have two children; Darian & Aamani.
