= Mike Santiago (American football) =

American football player and coach (1955–2023)

Biographical details
- Born: October 1, 1955; Baltimore, Maryland, U.S.
- Died: August 10, 2023 (aged 67); San Antonio, Texas, U.S.

Playing career
- 1973–1974: Glendale {AZ}
- 1975–1976: Southern Utah
- Position: Defensive back

Coaching career (HC unless noted)
- 1978: Lamar (SA)
- 1979: Lamar (WR)
- 1980–1981: Lamar (JV/WR)
- 1982: NC State (WR)
- 1983: Northern Arizona (WR)
- 1984: Cleveland Browns (scout)
- 1985–1986: Western Michigan (WR)
- 1987–1989: Southwest Texas State (QB/WR)
- 1990–1998: McNeese State (OC/QB)
- 1999–2004: Stephen F. Austin
- 2005–2006: Utah State (OC/QB)
- 2009–2011: Incarnate Word
- 2017–2022: Central Catholic HS (TX)

Head coaching record
- Overall: 49–45 (college)

Accomplishments and honors

Championships
- 1 Southland (1999)

Michael Edward Santiago (October 1, 1955 – August 10, 2023) was an American football coach. He served as head football coach at Stephen F. Austin State University (SFA) from 1999 to 2004, and the University of the Incarnate Word (UIW) from 2009 through 2011, compiling a career college football head coaching record of 49–45. He was also head football coach of Central Catholic High School in San Antonio from 2017 until his death from cancer, in 2023, at the age of 67.

== Head coaching record ==
=== College ===
Year	Team	Overall	Conference	Standing	Bowl/playoffs
Stephen F. Austin Lumberjacks (Southland Conference) (1999–2004)
1999	Stephen F. Austin	8–3	6–1	T–1st	
2000	Stephen F. Austin	6–5	3–4	5th	
2001	Stephen F. Austin	6–5	4–2	T–3rd	
2002	Stephen F. Austin	6–5	3–3	T–3rd	
2003	Stephen F. Austin	7–4	4–1	2nd	
2004	Stephen F. Austin	6–5	1–4	T–5th	
Stephen F. Austin:		39–27	21–15		
Incarnate Word Cardinals (NCAA Division II independent) (2009)
2009	Incarnate Word	5–5			
Incarnate Word Cardinals (Lone Star Conference) (2010–2011)
2010	Incarnate Word	3–8	3–7	7th (South)	
2011	Incarnate Word	2–5	2–3	T–6th	
Incarnate Word:		10–18	5–10		
Total:		49–45			
National championship Conference title Conference division title or championship game berth
