= Clint Killough =

American football coach (born 1993)

Current position
- Title: Head coach
- Team: Incarnate Word
- Conference: Southland
- Record: 33-16

Biographical details
- Born: June 11, 1993 (age 33)

Playing career
- 2012: Texas Tech / Texas State
- 2013–2015: Incarnate Word
- Position: Wide receiver

Coaching career (HC unless noted)
- 2017: Bowling Green (GA)
- 2018–2019: Incarnate Word (QC)
- 2020–2021: Incarnate Word (IWR/RC)
- 2022: Incarnate Word (assoc. HC/WR)
- 2023–present: Incarnate Word

Head coaching record
- Overall: 32–16
- Tournaments: 1–1

Accomplishments and honors

Championships
- 1 Southland (2024)

Awards
- Southland Coach of the Year (2024)

Clinton Killough (born June 11, 1993) is an American college football coach who is the head football coach for the Incarnate Word Cardinals (UIW).

== Playing career ==
Killough grew up in San Antonio, Texas and attended Douglas MacArthur High School. He played on the Brahmas football team. He was the Brahmas starting quarterback for three seasons. Killough was named first-team All-District 26-5A as a senior after passing for 2,273 yards and 31 touchdowns while also rushing for 743 yards and 11 touchdowns. He initially committed and enrolled to play college football at Texas Tech. Killough spent the summer and fall of his redshirt season in Lubbock before transferring to Texas State. He spent one semester with the Bobcats before transferring to the University of the Incarnate Word. Over three seasons playing for the Cardinals he caught 54 passes for 692 yards and two touchdowns. His 90-yard touchdown reception on September 28, 2013, vs. Eastern New Mexico still stands as the longest touchdown from scrimmage in Cardinal history.

== Coaching career ==
Killough began his coaching career as a graduate assistant at Bowling Green in 2017, where he worked with defensive backs and special teams. After one season he returned to Incarnate Word as an offensive quality control coach. Killough was promoted to inside wide receivers coach and added duties as the Cardinals' recruiting coordinator in 2020. He was briefly the interim head coach after the 2021 season when head coach Eric Morris left UIW to become the offensive coordinator at Washington State. Killough was elevated to wide receivers coach and named associate head coach by new head coach G. J. Kinne. He was hired as Incarnate Word's head coach on December 15, 2022, to replace Kinne after he was hired as the head coach at Texas State.

== Head coaching record ==
Year	Team	Overall	Conference	Standing	Bowl/playoffs	STATS^{#}	Coaches^{°}
Incarnate Word Cardinals (Southland Conference) (2023–present)
2023	Incarnate Word	9–2	6–1	2nd		22	14
2024	Incarnate Word	11–3	7–0	1st	L NCAA Division I Quarterfinal	6	6
2025	Incarnate Word	5–7	3–5	T–7th			
2026	Incarnate Word	7–4	6–2	–			
Incarnate Word:		32–16	22–8				
Total:		32–16					
National championship Conference title Conference division title or championship game berth
