= Kelechi Anyalebechi =

American gridiron football player (born 2000)

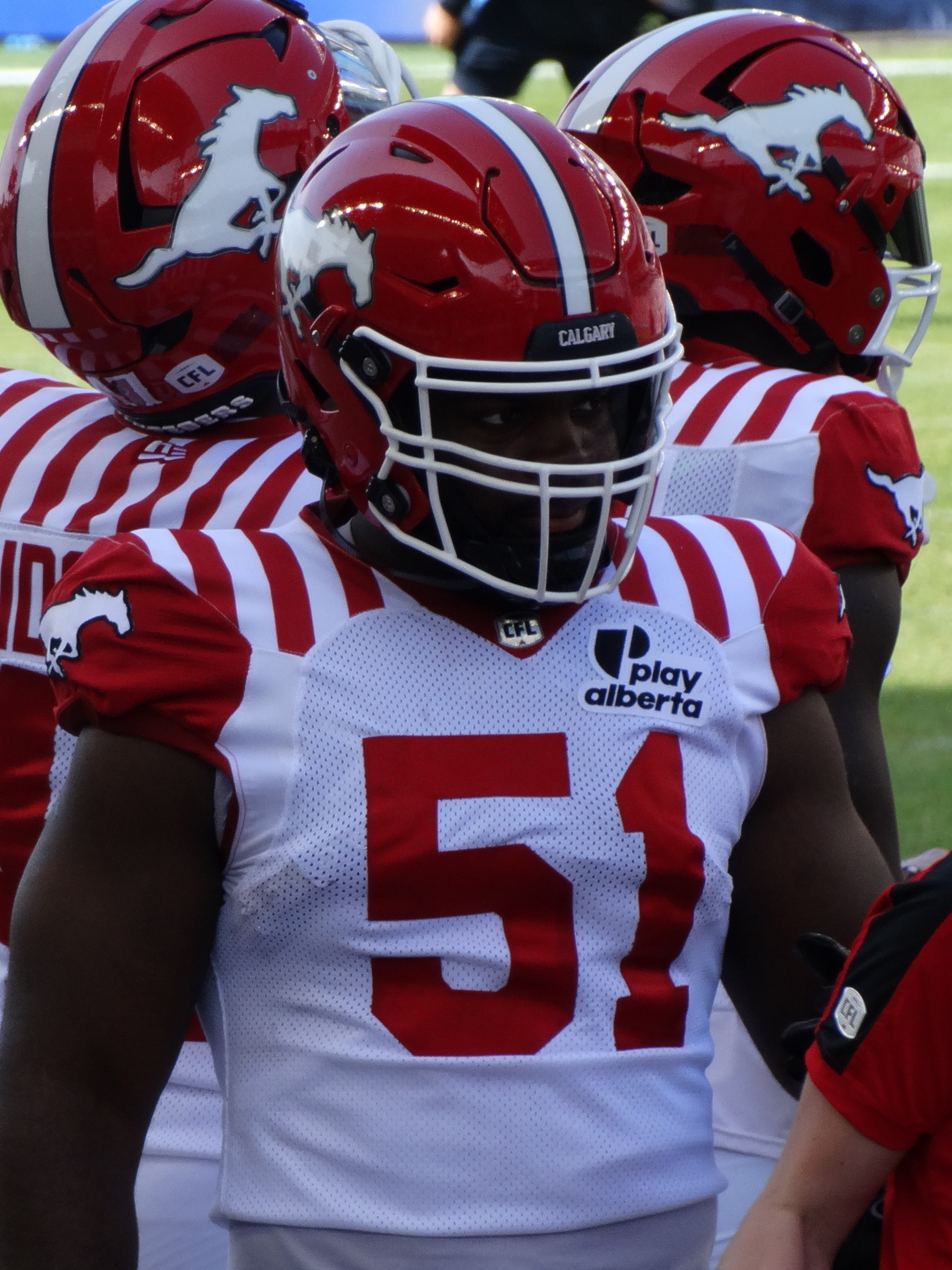
- Anyalebechi with the Calgary Stampeders in 2025

No. 51 – Calgary Stampeders
- Position: Linebacker
- Roster status: Active
- CFL status: American

Personal information
- Born: September 12, 2000 (age 26)
- Listed height: 6 ft 0 in (1.83 m)
- Listed weight: 234 lb (106 kg)

Career information
- High school: Shadow Creek (Pearland, Texas)
- College: Incarnate Word (2018–2022)
- NFL draft: 2023: undrafted

Career history
- Los Angeles Rams (2023)*; San Antonio Brahmas (2024); Calgary Stampeders (2025–present)
- * Offseason or practice squad member only

Awards and highlights
- SLC Defensive Player of the Year (2022); 3× First-team All-SLC (2020–2022)

Career CFL statistics as of 2026
- Games played: 18
- Tackles: 57
- Stats at CFL.ca

Kelechi Anyalebechi (born September 12, 2000) is an American professional football linebacker for the Calgary Stampeders of the Canadian Football League (CFL). He played college football for the Incarnate Word Cardinals.

== Early life ==
Anyalebechi was born on September 12, 2000. He attended Shadow Creek High School in Pearland, Texas.

== College career ==
Anyalebechi played college football for the Incarnate Word Cardinals from 2018 to 2022. He played 48 games, recording 285 tackles, including 28 for loss, 9.5 sacks, four interceptions, 12 pass deflections, six forced fumbles and four fumble recoveries. Anyalebechi earned three consecutive first-team All-Southland Conference (SLC) honors from 2020 to 2022 and was named the SLC Defensive Player of the Year in 2022.

== Professional career ==
Pre-draft measurables
Height	Weight	Arm length	Hand span	Wingspan	40-yard dash	10-yard split	20-yard split	20-yard shuttle	Three-cone drill	Vertical jump	Broad jump	Bench press
5 ft 11 in (1.80 m)	230 lb (104 kg)	31 7/8 in (0.81 m)	9 1/2 in (0.24 m)	6 ft 7 in (2.01 m)	4.69 s	1.58 s	2.53 s	4.39 s	7.01 s	38 in (0.97 m)	9 ft 8 in (2.95 m)	22 reps
All values from Pro day

=== Los Angeles Rams ===
After not being selected in the 2023 NFL draft, Anyalebechi signed with the Los Angeles Rams of the National Football League (NFL) as an undrafted free agent.

=== San Antonio Brahmas ===
On February 28, 2024, Anyalebechi signed with the San Antonio Brahmas of the United Football League (UFL). He played nine games and recorded eight tackles.

=== Calgary Stampeders ===
On January 2, 2025, Anyalebechi signed with the Calgary Stampeders of the Canadian Football League (CFL). In 2025, he played seven games and made four tackles.
