= Todd Ivicic =

American football coach (born c. 1968)

Current position
- Title: Assistant coach
- Team: Rice HS (TX)

Biographical details
- Born: c. 1968 (age 57–58); Taylor, Texas, U.S.
- Education: Sam Houston State University (1991, 1996)

Playing career
- 1987–1988: Blinn
- 1989–1990: Sam Houston State
- Position: Defensive end

Coaching career (HC unless noted)
- 1991–1992: Sam Houston State (GA)
- 1993–1994: Blinn (assistant ST/DL)
- 1995–1998: Sam Houston State (assistant ST/DL)
- 1999–2000: Stephen F. Austin (ST/DL)
- 2001–2002: Stephen F. Austin (ST/LB)
- 2003–2004: Stephen F. Austin (ST/DL)
- 2005: Tarleton State (ST/OL)
- 2006–2007: Tarleton State (ST/DL)
- 2008–2011: Incarnate Word (DC/ST)
- 2011: Incarnate Word (interim HC)
- 2012–2016: Incarnate Word (AHC/ST/DL)
- 2017–2019: Lamar (ST/DL)
- 2020–2021: Navarro (DC/ST/LB)
- 2022: SMU (QC)
- 2023–present: Rice HS (TX) (assistant)

Head coaching record
- Overall: 0–3

Todd Ivicic (born c. 1968) is an American college football coach. He is an assistant coach for Rice High School, a position he has held since 2023. He was the interim head football coach for the University of the Incarnate Word in 2011. He also coached for Sam Houston State, Blinn College, Stephen F. Austin, Tarleton State, Lamar, Navarro College, and SMU. He played college football for Blinn College and Sam Houston State as a defensive end.

== Head coaching record ==
Year	Team	Overall	Conference	Standing
Incarnate Word Cardinals (Lone Star Conference) (2011)
2011	Incarnate Word	0–3 (Note: Ivicic was named interim head coach with three weeks remaining in the season following the firing of Mike Santiago.)	0–3	T–6th
Incarnate Word:		0–3	0–3	
Total:		0–3		
