= Incarnate Word Cardinals football =

College Football team of The University of the Incarnate Word

| 2026 Incarnate Word Cardinals football team |
- First season: 2009; 17 years ago
- Head coach: Clint Killough; 4th season, 32–16 (.667)
- Location: San Antonio, Texas
- Stadium: Gayle and Tom Benson Stadium (capacity: 6,000)
- NCAA division: Division I FCS
- Conference: Southland
- Colors: Red, white, and black
- All-time record: 98–103 (.488)

Conference championships
- SLC: 2018, 2021, 2022, 2024
- Fight song: "Cardinal Fight"
- Mascot: Red Cardinal
- Marching band: Marching Cardinals
- Outfitter: Adidas
- Website: uiwcardinals.com

The Incarnate Word Cardinals football program is the intercollegiate American football team for the University of the Incarnate Word (UIW) located in San Antonio, Texas. The program began in 2009 and originally competed in NCAA Division II as members of the Lone Star Conference. In 2013, the school moved to Division I. For the 2013 season, UIW competed as a member of the Southland Conference for all sports except football. Football competed with an 11-game schedule as an Independent. UIW began playing Southland football in the 2014 season. The team plays its home games at the 6,000 seat Gayle and Tom Benson Stadium.

== History ==
UIW held its first team practice on August 27, 2008, and began competing as an NCAA Division II independent on August 29, 2009.

=== Conference Affiliations ===
- 2009: Division II Independent
- 2010–2012: Lone Star Conference
- 2013: FCS Independent
- 2014–present: Southland Conference

=== Coaches ===
| Name | Seasons | Record | Pct. |
| Mike Santiago | 2009–2011 | 10–18 | .357 |
| Todd Ivicic | 2011* | 0–3 | .000 |
| Larry Kennan | 2012–2017 | 20–46 | .303 |
| Eric Morris | 2018–2021 | 24–18 | .571 |
| G. J. Kinne | 2022 | 12–2 | .857 |
| Clint Killough | 2023–present | 32–16 | .667 |

*Ivicic served as interim head coach for the final three games of 2011, completing Santiago's third season as coach

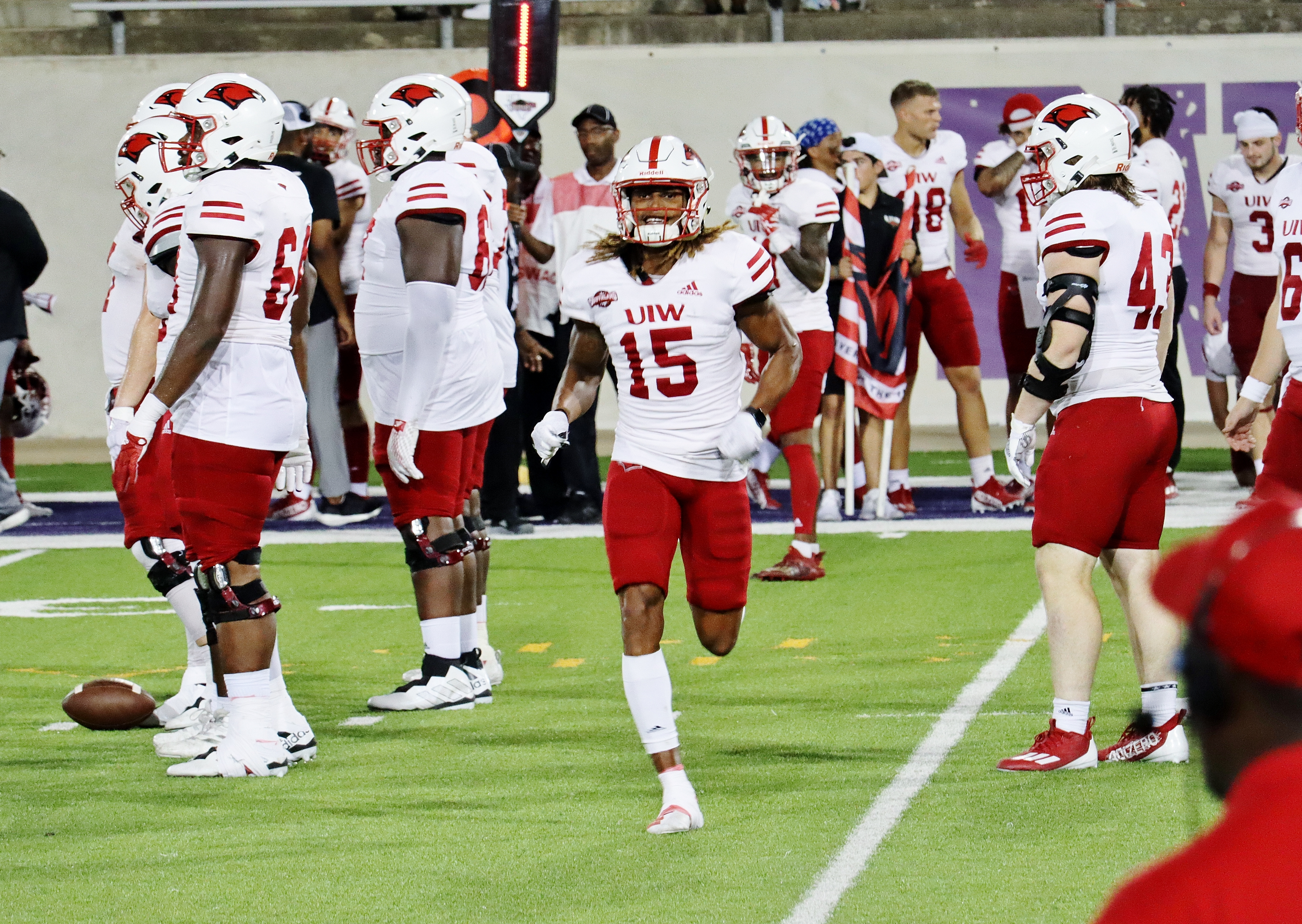
A Cardinals football game in 2022

== Conference Championships ==
UIW has won 4 Southland Conference championships, two shared and two outright.

| Year | Conference | Coach | Overall Record | Conference Record |
|---|---|---|---|---|
| 2018† | Southland Conference | Eric Morris | 6–5 | 6–2 |
| 2021 | Southland Conference | Eric Morris | 10–3 | 7–1 |
| 2022† | Southland Conference | G. J. Kinne | 12–2 | 5–1 |
| 2024 | Southland Conference | Clint Killough | 11–3 | 7–0 |
| Total Conference Championships | | | 4 |

† Co-champions

== Playoff appearances ==
=== NCAA Division I-AA/FCS ===
The Cardinals have participated in the NCAA Division I FCS playoffs four times. Their combined record is 4–4.

| Year | Round | Opponent | Result |
|---|---|---|---|
| 2018 | First Round | Montana State | L, 14–35 |
| 2021 | First Round; Second Round | Stephen F. Austin; Sam Houston | W, 35–28 ^{OT} L, 42–49 |
| 2022 | Second round Quarterfinals; Semifinals | Furman; Sacramento State; North Dakota State | W, 41–38; W, 66–63; L, 32–35 |
| 2024 | Second Round; Quarterfinals | Villanova; South Dakota State | W, 13–6; L, 14–55 |

== Year-by-year results ==
Legend

^{†} Conference champions
Playoff berth

List of Incarnate Word Cardinals football seasons
| Season | Team | Head coach | Conference | Division | Regular season results | | | | | | | Postseason results | Final ranking | |
| Season | Team | Head coach | Conference | Division | Overall | | | Conference | | | | Playoff result | STATS Poll | Coaches' Poll |
| Season | Team | Head coach | Conference | Division | Win | Loss | Pct. | Win | Loss | Pct. | Finish | Playoff result | STATS Poll | Coaches' Poll |
|---|---|---|---|---|---|---|---|---|---|---|---|---|---|---|
Incarnate Word Cardinals
| 2009 | 2009 | Mike Santiago | Division II Independent | — | 5 | 5 | .500 | 0 | 0 | — | N/A | — | — | — |
| 2010 | 2010 | Mike Santiago | Lone Star | South | 3 | 8 | .273 | 3 | 7 | .300 | 12th | — | — | — |
| 2011 | 2011 | Mike Santiago / Todd Ivicic (Interim) | Lone Star | — | 2 | 8 | .200 | 2 | 5 | .286 | 6th | — | — | — |
| 2012 | 2012 | Larry Kennan | Lone Star | — | 2 | 9 | .182 | 1 | 7 | .125 | 9th | — | — | — |
| 2013 | 2013 | Larry Kennan | FCS Independent | — | 6 | 5 | .545 | 0 | 0 | — | N/A | — | — | — |
| 2014 | 2014 | Larry Kennan | Southland | — | 2 | 9 | .182 | 2 | 6 | .250 | 9th | — | — | — |
| 2015 | 2015 | Larry Kennan | Southland | — | 6 | 5 | .545 | 5 | 4 | .556 | 4th | — | — | — |
| 2016 | 2016 | Larry Kennan | Southland | — | 3 | 8 | .273 | 3 | 6 | .333 | 8th | — | — | — |
| 2017 | 2017 | Larry Kennan | Southland | — | 1 | 10 | .091 | 1 | 7 | .125 | 9th | — | — | — |
| 2018 | 2018 ^{†} | Eric Morris | Southland | — | 6 | 5 | .545 | 6 | 2 | .750 | T–1st | NCAA Division I FCS playoffs – first round | — | — |
| 2019 | 2019 | Eric Morris | Southland | — | 5 | 7 | .417 | 4 | 5 | .444 | T–6th | — | — | — |
| 2020 | 2020 | Eric Morris | Southland | — | 3 | 3 | .500 | 3 | 3 | .500 | T–3rd | — | — | — |
| 2021 | 2021 ^{†} | Eric Morris | Southland | — | 10 | 3 | .769 | 6 | 1 | .857 | 1st | NCAA Division I FCS playoffs – second round | 12 | 13 |
| 2022 | 2022 ^{†} | G. J. Kinne | Southland | — | 12 | 2 | .857 | 5 | 1 | .833 | T–1st | NCAA Division I FCS playoffs – semifinals | 3 | 3 |
| 2023 | 2023 | Clint Killough | Southland | — | 9 | 2 | .818 | 6 | 1 | .857 | 2nd | — | 22 | 14 |
| 2024 | 2024 ^{†} | Clint Killough | Southland | — | 11 | 3 | .786 | 7 | 0 | 1.000 | 1st | NCAA Division I FCS playoffs – quarterfinals | 6 | 6 |
| 2025 | 2025 | Clint Killough | Southland | — | 5 | 7 | .417 | 3 | 5 | .375 | T–7th | — | — | — |
| 2026 | 2026 | Clint Killough | Southland | — | 7 | 4 | .636 | 6 | 2 | .750 | | — | — | — |
| Totals | | | | | All-time: 98–103 (.488) | | | Conference: 63–62 (.504) | | | — | Postseason: 4–4 (.500) | — | — |

== Stadium ==
UIW home football games are played on campus at Gayle and Tom Benson Stadium. Benson Stadium was dedicated on September 1, 2008 and currently seats 6,000 people. It is named after Tom Benson and his wife Gayle, whose generous monetary donations helped start up the UIW football program. Record stadium attendance of 6,498 was recorded in a game against Houston Baptist on November 17, 2016. UIW currently has an overall home record at the stadium of 59–38.

== All-time record vs. Southland teams ==
Official record (including any NCAA imposed vacates and forfeits) against all current Southland opponents:

| Opponent | Won | Lost | Percentage | Streak | First | Last |
|---|---|---|---|---|---|---|
| East Texas A&M | 6 | 1 | .857 | Lost 1 | 2010 | 2025 |
| Houston Christian | 12 | 0 | 1.000 | Won 12 | 2013 | 2026 |
| Lamar | 8 | 5 | .667 | Lost 1 | 2011 | 2026 |
| McNeese | 7 | 5 | .583 | Won 4 | 2014 | 2026 |
| Nicholls | 7 | 7 | .500 | Won 1 | 2014 | 2026 |
| Northwestern State | 6 | 3 | .667 | Won 4 | 2014 | 2026 |
| Southeastern Louisiana | 8 | 6 | .571 | Won 1 | 2013 | 2026 |
| Stephen F. Austin | 3 | 7 | .300 | Lost 2 | 2014 | 2026 |
| UT Rio Grande Valley | 1 | 1 | .500 | Won 1 | 2025 | 2026 |
| Totals | 58 | 35 | .624 | | | |

== Record against FBS competition ==
Overall (2–10)

| Season | Opponent | Division | Result | Score | Record |
|---|---|---|---|---|---|
| 2015 | UTEP | C-USA | L | 17–27 | 0–1 |
| 2016 | Texas State | Sun Belt | L | 17–48 | 0–2 |
| 2017 | Fresno State | Mountain West | L | 0–66 | 0–3 |
| 2018 | New Mexico | Mountain West | L | 30–62 | 0–4 |
| 2018 | North Texas | C-USA | L | 16–58 | 0–5 |
| 2019 | UTSA | C-USA | L | 7–35 | 0–6 |
| 2019 | New Mexico State | FBS Independent | L | 28–41 | 0–7 |
| 2021 | Texas State | Sun Belt | W | 42–34 | 1–7 |
| 2022 | Nevada | Mountain West | W | 55–41 | 2–7 |
| 2023 | UTEP | C-USA | L | 14–28 | 2–8 |
| 2025 | UTSA | American | L | 20–48 | 2–9 |
| 2026 | Texas State | Pac 12 | L | 10–63 | 2–10 |
| 2027 | Baylor | Big 12 | | | |
| 2029 | Texas Tech | Big 12 | | | |
| Total | | | | 2–10 | |

== Individual awards ==
=== Walter Payton Award winners ===
The Walter Payton Award is awarded annually to the most outstanding college offensive player in the Division I Football Championship Subdivision (formerly Division I-AA) as chosen by a nationwide panel of media and college sports information directors.

- 2022 – Lindsey Scott Jr.

=== Jerry Rice Award winners ===
The Jerry Rice Award is awarded annually to the most outstanding freshman player in the Division I Football Championship Subdivision (formerly Division I-AA) of college football as chosen by a nationwide panel of media and college sports information directors.

- 2020–21 – Cam Ward

=== Southland Conference Award winners ===
- Player of the Year

2022 – Lindsey Scott Jr., Quarterback
2024 – Zach Calzada, Quarterback

- Offensive Player of the Year

2021 – Cam Ward, Quarterback
2023 – Brandon Porter, Wide receiver
2024 – Jalen Walthall, Wide receiver

- Defensive Player of the Year

2022 – Kelechi Anyalebechi, Linebacker

- Newcomer of the Year

2015 – Myke Tavarres, Linebacker
2021 – Taylor Grimes, Wide receiver
2023 – Zach Calzada, Quarterback

- Freshman of the Year

2018 – Jon Copeland, Quarterback
2020–21 – Cam Ward, Quarterback

- Coach of the Year

2018 – Eric Morris
2021 – Eric Morris
2024 – Clint Killough

- Football Student-Athlete of the Year

2022 – Kelechi Anyalebechi, Linebacker
2024 – Roy Alexander, Wide Receiver

=== FCS All-Americans ===
| Year | Player | Position | First team | Second team | Third team |
|---|---|---|---|---|---|
| 2015 | Myke Tavarres | LB | STATS, AFCA | AP | — |
| 2017 | Joseph Zema | P | AP, STATS, HERO | AFCA | — |
| 2017 | Desmond Hite | KR | — | STATS, HERO | — |
| 2018 | Ra’Quanne Dickens | RB | — | — | STATS, HERO |
| 2020 | Kevin Brown | RB / AP | — | STATS, AFCA | — |
| 2021 | Cam Ward | QB | — | STATS | — |
| 2021 | Taylor Grimes | WR | — | AP, STATS, HERO | — |
| 2021 | Kelechi Anyalebechi | LB | — | — | AP, STATS |
| 2022 | Lindsey Scott Jr. | QB | AP, STATS, HERO, AFCA | — | — |
| 2022 | Darion Chafin | WR | — | — | AP, STATS |
| 2022 | Taylor Grimes | WR | — | AP, STATS | — |
| 2022 | Caleb Johnson | OL | — | — | AP |
| 2022 | Kelechi Anyalebechi | LB | — | AP, STATS | — |
| 2023 | Brandon Porter | WR | — | AP, STATS, FCS Football Central | — |
| 2023 | Steven Parker | DL | PFF | AFCA | STATS, FCS Football Central |
| 2024 | Roy Alexander | WR | — | — | STATS, FCS Football Central, Phil Steele/Draftscout |
| 2024 | Zach Calzada | QB | — | STATS | AP, FCS Football Central, Phil Steele/Draftscout |
| 2024 | Mason Chambers | DB | STATS | FCS Football Central, Phil Steele/Draftscout | AP |
| 2024 | Jalen Walthall | WR | AP, STATS, FCS Football Central, Phil Steele/Draftscout | — | — |
| 2025 | Jalen Walthall | WR | — | — | STATS, AP |

== Players in the NFL ==
| Player name | Position | Years at UIW | Years in NFL | NFL team |
|---|---|---|---|---|
| Justin Alexandre | DE | 2017–2018 | 2019 | Jets |
| Kelechi Anyalebechi | LB | 2018–2022 | 2023 | Rams |
| Elliott Davison | DB | 2020–2022 | 2025 | Saints |
| Taylor Grimes | WR | 2021–2022 | 2023 | Broncos |
| Alex Jenkins | DE | 2013–2016 | 2017–2019 | Saints, Giants |
| Nash Jones | OL | 2020–2022 | 2025 | Chargers, Broncos |
| B.J. Mayes | DB | 2021–2022 | 2025 | Eagles |
| Silas Stewart | LB | 2017–2018 | 2019 | Ravens |
| Myke Tavarres | LB | 2014–2015 | 2016 | Eagles |
| Cam Ward | QB | 2020–2021 | 2025–present | Titans |
| Jalen Walthall | WR | 2024–2025 | 2026 | Texans, Jets |
| Cole Wick | TE | 2012–2015 | 2016–2020 | Lions, 49ers, Titans, Raiders, Saints |
National Football League (NFL)

== Players in the CFL ==
| Player name | Position | Years at UIW | Years in CFL | CFL Team |
|---|---|---|---|---|
| Kelechi Anyalebechi | LB | 2018-2022 | 2025–present | Calgary Stampeders |
| Kevin Brown | RB | 2019–2021 | 2022–2025 | Edmonton Elks, Toronto Argonauts, Hamilton Tiger-Cats |
| Trevor Begue | WR | 2021 | 2023 | Edmonton Elks |
| Olivier Charles–Pierre | DT | 2022 | 2023 | Edmonton Elks |
| Jamari Gilbert | DB | 2013–2017 | 2019 | Calgary Stampeders |
| Robert Hayes, Jr. | DB | 2016 | 2022 | Montreal Alouettes |
| Nash Jones | OL | 2020–2022 | 2026–present | Edmonton Elks |
| Silas Stewart | DL | 2017–2018 | 2021–2024 | Calgary Stampeders, Ottawa Redblacks |
| Myke Tavarres | LB | 2014–2015 | 2017 | Hamilton Tiger-Cats |
| Joseph Zema | P | 2017 | 2021–present | Montreal Alouettes |
Canadian Football League (CFL)

== Future non-conference opponents ==
Announced non-conference opponents as of May 20, 2026.

| 2027 | 2028 | 2029 |
|---|---|---|
| at Baylor | Montana | at Texas Tech |
| Northern Arizona | | at Montana |
| at Eastern Washington | | |

== See also ==
- List of NCAA Division I FCS football programs
