= 2020 Missouri Valley Football Conference season =

American college football season

- League: NCAA Division I Football Championship Subdivision
- Sport: Football
- Duration: September 12, 2020 through May 16, 2021
- Teams: 10

2021 NFL Draft
- Top draft pick: Trey Lance, QB, North Dakota State
- Picked by: San Francisco 49ers (round 1, pick 3)

Regular season
- Champion Playoff Participants: Missouri State; South Dakota State; North Dakota North Dakota State; Southern Illinois

Football seasons
- 2019 2021

2020 Missouri Valley Football Conference standings
	Conf.			Overall
Team	W		L	W		L
No. 2 South Dakota State +^	5	–	1	8	–	2
No. 12 Missouri State +^	5	–	1	5	–	5
No. 7 North Dakota ^	4	–	1	5	–	2
No. 6 North Dakota State ^	5	–	2	7	–	3
No. 14 Southern Illinois ^	3	–	3	6	–	4
Northern Iowa	3	–	4	3	–	4
South Dakota	1	–	3	1	–	3
Illinois State†	1	–	3	1	–	3
Western Illinois†	1	–	5	1	–	5
Youngstown State	1	–	6	1	–	6
+ – Conference co-champions; ^ – FCS playoff participant; Note: Indiana State opted out of the spring season. † – Illinois State and Western Illinois opted out of the remainder of the spring season on March 21 and April 5, 2021, respectively.; Rankings from STATS Poll

The 2020 Missouri Valley Football Conference season was the 35th season of college football play for the Missouri Valley Football Conference and part of the 2020-21 NCAA Division I FCS football season. This was the MVFC's first season with 11 teams, as they added North Dakota in the offseason. Although, the conference technically only had 10 of their members play the season, since Indiana State opted out of the Spring season.

South Dakota State made it to their first ever National Championship as the number 1 seed, but lost to Sam Houston State. SDSU was one of three teams to be a conference co-champion, including Missouri State and North Dakota. North Dakota beat Missouri State in the first round of the playoffs, but lost to James Madison in the quarterfinals. North Dakota State and Southern Illinois also made the playoffs. North Dakota State beat Eastern Washington in the first round, but lost to eventual champion Sam Houston State in the quarterfinals to be eliminated before the semifinals for the first time since 2010. Southern Illinois beat Weber State in the first round, but lost to South Dakota State in the quarterfinals.

== Offseason ==
Over the offseason, the conference welcomed in their 11th league member, North Dakota. The Fighting Hawks arrive to the Valley from being a FCS Independent. Before that, they were a part of the Big Sky Conference.

== Coaching changes ==
=== Missouri State ===
On January 16, 2020, Bobby Petrino was named the new head coach at Missouri State. Petrino replaces former coach Dave Steckel after he was bought out on January 9, 2020.

=== Youngstown State ===
On February 7, 2020, Doug Phillips was named the new head coach at Youngstown State. Phillips replaces former coach Bo Pelini who stepped down to take a defensive coordinator position at LSU.

== Preseason ==
=== MVFC Media Day ===
==== Preseason Poll ====
The annual preseason poll; voted on by conference coaches, athletic directors, and media members.

Predicted finish	Team	Points
1	North Dakota State	101
2	Northern Iowa	92
3	South Dakota State	91
4	Illinois State	80
5	Southern Illinois	68
6	South Dakota	52
7	North Dakota	39
8	Youngstown State	36
T9	Missouri State	23
T9	Western Illinois	23

=== Preseason Awards ===
==== Individual awards ====
Award	Player	School	Position	Year
Preseason Team Offense	Will McElvain	Northern Iowa	QB	So.
Preseason Team Offense	Kai Henry	South Dakota	RB	Sr.
Preseason Team Offense	Pierre Strong Jr.	South Dakota State	RB	Jr.
Preseason Team Offense	Javon Williams Jr.	Southern Illinois	RB	So.
Preseason Team Offense	Hunter Luepke	North Dakota State	FB	So.
Preseason Team Offense	Avante Cox	Southern Illinois	WR	Jr.
Preseason Team Offense	Christian Watson	North Dakota State	WR	Jr.
Preseason Team Offense	Isaiah Weston	Northern Iowa	WR	Jr.
Preseason Team Offense	Brett Samson	South Dakota	TE	Sr.
Preseason Team Offense	Dan Becker	Youngstown State	OL	Jr.
Preseason Team Offense	ZeVeyon Furcron	Southern Illinois	OL	Sr.
Preseason Team Offense	Drew Himmelman	Illinois State	OL	Sr.
Preseason Team Offense	Mason Scheidegger	South Dakota	OL	Sr.
Preseason Team Offense	Cordell Volson	North Dakota State	OL	Sr.
Preseason Team Defense	Jared Brinkman	Northern Iowa	DL	Sr.
Preseason Team Defense	Anthony Knighton	Southern Illinois	DL	Sr.
Preseason Team Defense	Spencer Waege	North Dakota State	DL	Jr.
Preseason Team Defense	Reece Winkelman	South Dakota State	DL	Jr.
Preseason Team Defense	Logan Backhaus	South Dakota State	LB	Sr.
Preseason Team Defense	Jack Cochrane	South Dakota	LB	Sr.
Preseason Team Defense	Bryce Flater	Northern Iowa	LB	Jr.
Preseason Team Defense	Jackson Hankey	North Dakota State	LB	Jr.
Preseason Team Defense	Omar Brown	Northern Iowa	DB	So.
Preseason Team Defense	Qua Brown	Southern Illinois	DB	Sr.
Preseason Team Defense	Don Gardner	South Dakota State	DB	Sr.
Preseason Team Defense	Josh Hayes	North Dakota State	DB	Sr.
Preseason Team Defense	Michael Tutsie	North Dakota State	DB	Jr.
Preseason Team Special Teams	Ross Kennelly	North Dakota State	LS	Sr.
Preseason Team Special Teams	Matthew Cook	Northern Iowa	PK	So.
Preseason Team Special Teams	Brady Schutt	South Dakota	P	Sr.
Preseason Team Special Teams	Jake Coates	Youngstown State	RS	Sr.

Award	Player	School	Position	Year
Honorable Mention Offense	J'Bore Gibbs	South Dakota State	QB	So.
Honorable Mention Offense	Tim McCloyn	Illinois State	FB	Sr.
Honorable Mention Offense	Caleb Vander Esch	South Dakota	WR	Sr.
Honorable Mention Offense	Damoriea Vick	Missouri State	WR	Jr.
Honorable Mention Offense	Josh Babicz	North Dakota State	TE	Jr.
Honorable Mention Offense	Wes Genant	South Dakota State	OL	Sr.
Honorable Mention Offense	Ryan Tobin	North Dakota	OL	Sr.
Honorable Mention Offense	Nick Ellis	Northern Iowa	OL	RS Sr.
Honorable Mention Defense	John Ridgeway	Illinois State	DL	Jr.
Honorable Mention Defense	Xavier Ward	South Dakota State	DL	Sr.
Honorable Mention Defense	DeMarko Craig	Youngstown State	DL	So.
Honorable Mention Defense	Jaxson Turner	North Dakota	LB	Sr.
Honorable Mention Defense	Makel Calhoun	Southern Illinois	LB	Jr.
Honorable Mention Defense	Zeke Vandenburg	Illinois State	LB	Jr.
Honorable Mention Defense	Jordan Canady	North Dakota	DB	Sr.
Honorable Mention Defense	Michael Griffin II	South Dakota State	DB	Sr.
Honorable Mention Defense	Charles Woods	Illinois State	DB	Jr.
Honorable Mention Defense	Zack Sanders	Missouri State	DB	Sr.
Honorable Mention Special Teams	Dalton Godfrey	South Dakota	LS	Jr.
Honorable Mention Special Teams	Mason Lorber	South Dakota	PK	Sr.
Honorable Mention Special Teams	Adam Fellner	Western Illinois	P	So.
Honorable Mention Special Teams	Jaxon Janke	South Dakota State	RS	So.

== Rankings ==
Legend
	Improvement in ranking
	Drop in ranking
	Not ranked previous week
	No change in ranking from previous week
RV	Received votes but were not ranked in Top 25 of poll
т	Tied with team above or below also with this symbol

		Pre	Wk 1	Wk 2	Wk 3	Wk 4	Wk 5	Wk 6	Wk 7	Wk 8	Wk 9	Final
Illinois State	STATS Perform	9	7	15	22							
Illinois State	AFCA Coaches	Not released										
Missouri State	STATS Perform							19	15	14	12	13
Missouri State	AFCA Coaches	Not released						23	23	18	17	13
North Dakota	STATS Perform		14	4	3	2	6	6	6	6	7	6
North Dakota	AFCA Coaches	Not released				2	5т	6	6	6	6	6
North Dakota State	STATS Perform	1	1	6	5	4	2	2	2	2	6	5
North Dakota State	AFCA Coaches	Not released				4	3	3	3	3	7	5
Northern Iowa	STATS Perform	3	5	3	4	10	22	23	24		24	
Northern Iowa	AFCA Coaches	Not released				14т	23	20	21	23	24	
South Dakota	STATS Perform	20т	21									
South Dakota	AFCA Coaches	Not released										
South Dakota State	STATS Perform	5	3	8	8	6	4	4	4	4	2	2
South Dakota State	AFCA Coaches	Not released				7	5т	4	4	4	2	2
Southern Illinois	STATS Perform	24		11	10	5	10	18	16	18	14	8
Southern Illinois	AFCA Coaches	Not released				5	12	19	18	17	14	9
Western Illinois	STATS Perform											
Western Illinois	AFCA Coaches	Not released										
Youngstown State	STATS Perform											
Youngstown State	AFCA Coaches	Not released										

== Schedule ==
Index to colors and formatting
MVFC member won
MVFC member lost
MVFC teams in **bold**

All times Central time.

† denotes Homecoming game
^ denotes AP Poll ranking for FBS teams

=== Regular season schedule ===
==== Fall 2020 Games ====
Some teams played a couple games in the Fall, even though the MVFC schedule was moved to the Spring.

Date	Time	Visiting team	Home team	Site	TV	Result	Attendance	Ref.
September 12	6:00 p.m.	**Missouri State**	No. 5^ Oklahoma	Gaylord Family Oklahoma Memorial Stadium • Norman, OK		**L** 0–48	22,700	
September 26	7:00 p.m.	**Missouri State**	No. 11 Central Arkansas	Estes Stadium • Conway, AR	ESPN3	**L** 20–27	2,500	
October 3	2:30 p.m.	No. 11 Central Arkansas	No. 1 **North Dakota State**	Fargodome • Fargo, ND	ESPN+	**W** 39–28	471	
October 17	7:00 p.m.	No. 11 Central Arkansas	**Missouri State**†	Robert W. Plaster Stadium • Springfield, MO	ESPN3	**L** 24–33	5,489	
October 30	6:00 p.m.	No. 25 Southeast Missouri State	No. 24 **Southern Illinois**	Saluki Stadium • Carbondale, IL	ESPN3	**W** 20–17	N/A	
^{#}Rankings from Stats Perform. All times are in Central Time.

==== Week 1 ====
Date	Time	Visiting team	Home team	Site	TV	Result	Attendance	Ref.
February 19	6:00 p.m.	**Western Illinois**	**South Dakota**	DakotaDome • Vermillion, SD		Cancelled	-	
February 19	7:00 p.m.	No. 5 **South Dakota State**	No. 3 **Northern Iowa**	UNI-Dome • Cedar Falls, IA	ESPN+	**SDSU** 24–20	2,137	
February 20	12:00 p.m.	No. 24 **Southern Illinois**	**North Dakota**	Alerus Center • Grand Forks, ND	ESPN+	**UND** 44–21	3,176	
February 21	2:30 p.m.	**Youngstown State**	No. 1 **North Dakota State**	Fargodome • Fargo, ND	ESPN+	**NDSU** 39–28	6,578	
^{#}Rankings from Stats Perform. All times are in Central Time.

Date	Bye Week	
February 21	No. 9 Illinois State	Missouri State

==== Week 2 ====
Date	Time	Visiting team	Home team	Site	TV	Result	Attendance	Ref.
February 27	11:00 a.m.	No. 5 **Northern Iowa**	No. RV **Youngstown State**	Stambaugh Stadium • Youngstown, OH	ESPN+	**UNI** 21–0	2,128	
February 27	12:00 p.m.	No. 1 **North Dakota State**	**Southern Illinois**	Saluki Stadium • Carbondale, IL	ESPN+	**SIU** 38–14	2,400	
February 27	12:00 p.m.	No. 3 **South Dakota State**	No. 14 **North Dakota**	Alerus Center • Grand Forks, ND	ESPN+	**UND** 28–17	3,638	
February 27	12:00 p.m.	**South Dakota**	No. 7 **Illinois State**	Hancock Stadium • Normal, IL		**USD** 27–20	1,853	
February 27	12:00 p.m.	**Missouri State**	**Western Illinois**	Hanson Field • Macomb, IL	ESPN+	**MOST** 30–24	421	
^{#}Rankings from Stats Perform. All times are in Central Time.

==== Week 3 ====
Date	Time	Visiting team	Home team	Site	TV	Result	Attendance	Ref.
March 4	5:00 p.m.	No. 20т **South Dakota**	No. 4 **North Dakota**	Alerus Center • Grand Forks, ND	ESPN+	**UND** 21–10	3,491	
March 6	11:00 a.m.	No. 11 **Southern Illinois**	**Youngstown State**	Stambaugh Stadium • Youngstown, OH	ESPN+	**SIU** 30–22	1,901	
March 6	2:00 p.m.	No. 6 **North Dakota State**	**Missouri State**	Robert W. Plaster Stadium • Carbondale, IL	ESPN+	**NDSU** 25–0	3,147	
March 6	2:00 p.m.	**Western Illinois**	No. 8 **South Dakota State**	Dana J. Dykhouse Stadium • Brookings, SD		**SDSU** 45–10	2,347	
March 6	4:00 p.m.	No. 15 **Illinois State**	No. 3 **Northern Iowa**	UNI-Dome • Cedar Falls, IA	ESPN+	**UNI** 20–10	1,920	
^{#}Rankings from Stats Perform. All times are in Central Time.

==== Week 4 ====
Date	Time	Visiting team	Home team	Site	TV	Result	Attendance	Ref.
March 13	1:00 p.m.	**Missouri State**	No. 21 **South Dakota**	DakotaDome • Vermillion, SD	ESPN+	**MOST** 27–24	2,051	
March 13	2:00 p.m.	**Youngstown State**	No. 8 **South Dakota State**	Dana J. Dykhouse Stadium • Brookings, SD		**SDSU** 19–17	2,653	
March 13	2:30 p.m.	No. 22 **Illinois State**	No. 5 **North Dakota State**	Fargodome • Fargo, ND	ESPN+	**NDSU** 21–13	6,145	
^{#}Rankings from Stats Perform. All times are in Central Time.

==== Week 5 ====
Date	Time	Visiting team	Home team	Site	TV	Result	Attendance	Ref.
March 20	11:00 a.m.	**South Dakota**	**Youngstown State**	Stambaugh Stadium • Youngstown, OH		**YSU** 28–10	2,159	
March 20	12:00 p.m.	No. 6 **South Dakota State**	No. 5 **Southern Illinois**	Saluki Stadium • Carbondale, IL	ESPN+	**SDSU** 44–3	2,400	
March 20	2:30 p.m.	No. 2 **North Dakota**	No. 4 **North Dakota State**	Fargodome • Fargo, ND	ESPN+	**NDSU** 21–13	9,121	
^{#}Rankings from Stats Perform. All times are in Central Time.

==== Week 6 ====
Date	Time	Visiting team	Home team	Site	TV	Result	Attendance	Ref.
March 27	11:00 a.m.	No. 22 **Northern Iowa**	**Western Illinois**	Hanson Field • Macomb, IL	ESPN+	**UNI** 34–20	542	
March 27	1:00 p.m.	No. 2 **North Dakota State**	**South Dakota**	DakotaDome • Vermillion, SD	ESPN+	Cancelled	-	
March 27	2:00 p.m.	**Illinois State**	No. 4 **South Dakota State**	Dana J. Dykhouse Stadium • Brookings, SD		Canceled	-	
March 27	2:00 p.m.	No. 10 **Southern Illinois**	**Missouri State**	Robert W. Plaster Stadium • Springfield, MO	ESPN+	**MOST** 30–27	3,581	
^{#}Rankings from Stats Perform. All times are in Central Time.

Date	Bye Week
March 27	Youngstown State

==== Week 7 ====
Date	Time	Visiting team	Home team	Site	TV	Result	Attendance	Ref.
April 2	6:00 p.m.	No. 23 **Northern Iowa**	**South Dakota**	DakotaDome • Vermillion, SD		Canceled	-	
April 3	11:00 a.m.	No. 19 **Missouri State**	No. 6 **North Dakota**	Alerus Center • Grand Forks, ND		Canceled	-	
April 3	12:00 p.m.	**Illinois State**	No. 18 **Southern Illinois**	Saluki Stadium • Carbondale, IL	ESPN+	Canceled	-	
April 3	7:00 p.m.	**Youngstown State**	**Western Illinois**	Hanson Field • Macomb, IL	ESPN+	**WIU** 27–24	679	
^{#}Rankings from Stats Perform. All times are in Central Time.

Date	Bye Week
April 3	No. 2 North Dakota State

==== Week 8 ====
Date	Time	Visiting team	Home team	Site	TV	Result	Attendance	Ref.
April 10	12:00 p.m.	**Western Illinois**	No. 16 **Southern Illinois**	Saluki Stadium • Carbondale, IL		Canceled	-	
April 10	12:00 p.m.	No. 6 **North Dakota**	**Illinois State**	Hancock Stadium • Normal, IL		Canceled	-	
April 10	2:00 p.m.	**Youngstown State**	No. 15 **Missouri State**	Robert W. Plaster Stadium • Springfield, MO	ESPN+	**MOST** 21–10	2,948	
April 10	2:00 p.m.	**South Dakota**	No. 4 **South Dakota State**	Dana J. Dykhouse Stadium • Brookings, SD		Canceled	-	
April 10	4:00 p.m.	No. 2 **North Dakota State**	No. 24 **Northern Iowa**	UNI-Dome • Cedar Falls, IA	ESPN+	**NDSU** 23–20	2,037	
^{#}Rankings from Stats Perform. All times are in Central Time.

==== Week 9 ====
Date	Time	Visiting team	Home team	Site	TV	Result	Attendance	Ref.
April 17	11:00 a.m.	No. 6 **North Dakota**	**Youngstown State**	Stambaugh Stadium • Youngstown, OH		Canceled	-	
April 17	12:00 p.m.	No. 15 Southeastern Louisiana	No. 18 **Southern Illinois**	Saluki Stadium • Carbondale, IL	ESPN+	**W** 55–48	2,400	
April 17	1:00 p.m.	**Western Illinois**	**South Dakota**	DakotaDome • Vermillion, SD		Canceled	-	
April 17	1:00 p.m.	**Illinois State**	No. 14 **Missouri State**	Robert W. Plaster Stadium • Springfield, MO		Canceled	-	
April 17	2:30 p.m.	No. 4 **South Dakota State**	No. 2 **North Dakota State**	Fargodome • Fargo, ND	ESPN+	**SDSU** 27–17	8,762	
^{#}Rankings from Stats Perform. All times are in Central Time.

Date	Bye Week
April 17	Northern Iowa

== Postseason ==
In 2020, five teams made the FCS playoffs. South Dakota State (No. 1) was the only seeded team. Missouri State, North Dakota, North Dakota State, and Southern Illinois were all unseeded. Below are the games in which they played.

Index to colors and formatting
MVFC member won
MVFC member lost
MVFC teams in **bold**

All times Central time. Tournament seedings in parentheses

=== First round ===
Date	Time	Visiting team	Home team	Site	TV	Result	Attendance	Ref.
April 24	2:00 p.m.	Holy Cross	No. 2 (1) **South Dakota State**	Dana J. Dykhouse Stadium • Brookings, SD	ESPN3	**W** 31–3	2,998	
April 24	2:30 p.m.	No. 9 Eastern Washington	No. 6 **North Dakota State**	Fargodome • Fargo, ND	ESPN3	**W** 42–20	3,587	
April 24	3:00 p.m.	No. 12 **Missouri State**	No. 7 **North Dakota**	Alerus Center • Grand Forks, ND	ESPN3	**UND** 44–10	3,074	
April 24	3:00 p.m.	No. 14 **Southern Illinois**	No. 3 Weber State	Stewart Stadium • Ogden, UT	ESPN3	**W** 34–31	4,033	
^{#}Rankings from Stats Perform. All times are in Central Time.

=== Quarterfinals ===
Date	Time	Visiting team	Home team	Site	TV	Result	Attendance	Ref.
May 2	2:00 p.m.	No. 6 **North Dakota State**	No. 4 (2) Sam Houston State	Bowers Stadium • Huntsville, TX	ESPN	**L** 20–24	4,984	
May 2	5:00 p.m.	No. 6 **North Dakota**	No. 1 (2) James Madison	Bridgeforth Stadium • Harrisburg, VA	ESPN2	**L** 21–34	5,854	
May 2	8:00 p.m.	No. 14 **Southern Illinois**	No. 2 (1) **South Dakota State**	Dana J. Dykhouse Stadium • Brookings, SD	ESPN2	**SDSU** 31–26	3,547	
^{#}Rankings from Stats Perform. All times are in Central Time.

=== Semifinals ===
Date	Time	Visiting team	Home team	Site	TV	Result	Attendance	Ref.
May 8	11:00 a.m.	No. 5 Delaware	No. 2 (1) **South Dakota State**	Dana J. Dykhouse Stadium • Brookings, SD	ESPN	**W** 33–3	4,527	
^{#}Rankings from Stats Perform. All times are in Central Time.

=== National Championship ===
Date	Time	Visiting team	Home team	Site	TV	Result	Attendance	Ref.
May 16	1:00 p.m.	No. 4 (2) Sam Houston State	No. 2 (1) **South Dakota State**	Toyota Stadium • Frisco, TX	ABC	**L** 21–23	7,840	
^{#}Rankings from Stats Perform. All times are in Central Time.

== MVFC records vs other conferences ==
2020-21 records against non-conference foes:

FCS Power Conferences	Record
Big Sky	None
CAA	None
FCS Power Total	0–0
Other FCS Conferences	Record
ASUN	None
Big South	None
Ivy League	None
MEAC	None
Northeast	None
OVC	1–0
Patriot	None
PFL	None
SoCon	None
Southland	3–1
SWAC	None
WAC	None
Other FCS Total	4–1
FBS Opponents	Record
Football Bowl Subdivision	0–1
Total Non-Conference Record	4–2

Post Season

FCS Power Conferences	Record
Big Sky	2–0
CAA	1–1
FCS Power Total	3–1
Other FCS Conferences	Record
ASUN	None
Big South	None
Ivy League	None
MEAC	None
Northeast	None
OVC	None
Patriot	1–0
PFL	None
SoCon	None
Southland	0–2
SWAC	None
WAC	None
Other FCS Total	1–2
Total Postseason Record	4–3

== Awards and honors ==
=== Player of the week honors ===
Week	Offensive			Defensive			Special Teams			Freshman		
Week	Player	Position	Team	Player	Position	Team	Player	Position	Team	Player	Position	Team
Week 1 (Feb. 22)	Pierre Strong Jr.	RB	SDSU	Devon Krzanowski	LB	UND	Jake Reinholz	PK	NDSU	Mark Gronowski	QB	SDSU
Week 2 (Feb. 28)	Nic Baker	QB	SIU	Kevin Ellis	DE	MOST	Brady Schutt	P	USD	Josh Navratil	LB	UND
Week 3 (Mar. 7)	Mark Gronowski	QB	SDSU	Spencer Cuvelier	LB	UNI	Garret Wegner	P	NDSU	Jaleel McLaughlin	RB	YSU
Week 4 (Mar. 14)	Tommy Schuster	QB	UND	Montrae Braswell	CB	MOST	Cole Frahm	PK	SDSU	Cam Miller	QB	NDSU
Week 5 (Mar. 21)	Hunter Luepke	FB	NDSU	Grant Dixon	LB	YSU	Jose Pizano	K	MOST	Isaiah Davis	RB	SDSU
Week 6 (Mar. 28)	Celdon Manning	RB	MOST	Riley Van Wyhe	LB	UNI	Omar Brown	DB	UNI	Matt Struck	QB	MOST
Week 7 (Apr. 4)	Tony Tate	WR	WIU	Michael Lawson	DB	WIU				Jaleel McLaughlin	RB	YSU
Week 8 (Apr. 11)	Christian Watson	WR	NDSU	Tylar Wiltz	LB	MOST	Garret Wegner	P	NDSU	Grant Dixon	LB	YSU
Week 9 (Apr. 18)	Javon Williams Jr.	RB	SIU	Adam Bock	LB	SDSU	Cole Frahm	PK	SDSU	Mark Gronowski	QB	SDSU

=== Players of the Year ===
On April 22, 2021, the Missouri Valley Football Conference released their Players of the Year and All-Conference Honors.

Offensive Player of the Year

- Mark Gronowski, QB (Fr, South Dakota State)

Defensive Player of the Year

- Jared Brinkman, DL (Sr, Northern Iowa)

Newcomer of the Year

- Mark Gronowski, QB (Fr, South Dakota State)

Freshman of the Year

- Mark Gronowski, QB (South Dakota State)

Coach of the Year

- Bobby Petrino, (Missouri State)

=== All-Conference Teams ===
Award	Player	School	Position	Year
First Team Offense	Mark Gronowski	South Dakota State	QB	Fr.
First Team Offense	Pierre Strong Jr.	South Dakota State	RB	Jr.
First Team Offense	Otis Weah	North Dakota	RB	So.
First Team Offense	Hunter Luepke	North Dakota State	FB	So.
First Team Offense	Avante Cox	Southern Illinois	WR	Jr.
First Team Offense	Dennis Houston	Western Illinois	WR	Sr.
First Team Offense	Christian Watson	North Dakota State	WR	Jr.
First Team Offense	Zach Heins	South Dakota State	TE	So.
First Team Offense	Zeveyon Furcron	Southern Illinois	OL	Sr.
First Team Offense	Garret Greenfield	South Dakota State	OL	So.
First Team Offense	Drew Himmelman	Illinois State	OL	Sr.
First Team Offense	Nathan Nguon	North Dakota	OL	Sr.
First Team Offense	Cordell Volson	North Dakota State	OL	Sr.
First Team Defense	Jared Brinkman	Northern Iowa	DL	Sr.
First Team Defense	John Ridgeway	Illinois State	DL	Jr.
First Team Defense	Caleb Sanders	South Dakota State	DL	Jr.
First Team Defense	Spencer Waege	North Dakota State	DL	Jr.
First Team Defense	Logan Backhaus	South Dakota State	LB	Sr.
First Team Defense	Spencer Cuvelier	Northern Iowa	LB	Jr.
First Team Defense	Grant Dixon	Youngstown State	LB	Sr.
First Team Defense	James Kaczor	North Dakota State	LB	Jr.
First Team Defense	Montrae Braswell	Missouri State	DB	So.
First Team Defense	Qua Brown	Southern Illinois	DB	Sr.
First Team Defense	James Caesar	Southern Illinois	DB	Sr.
First Team Defense	Don Gardner	South Dakota State	DB	Sr.
First Team Defense	Josh Hayes	North Dakota State	DB	Sr.
First Team Special Teams	Matthew Cook	Northern Iowa	PK	So.
First Team Special Teams	Ross Kennelly	North Dakota State	LS	Sr.
First Team Special Teams	Garret Wegner	North Dakota State	P	Sr.
First Team Special Teams	Tony Tate	Western Illinois	RS	Sr.

Award	Player	School	Position	Year
Second Team Offense	Connor Sampson	Western Illinois	QB	Sr.
Second Team Offense	Tommy Schuster	North Dakota	QB	Fr.
Second Team Offense	Jaleel McLaughlin	Youngstown State	RB	Jr.
Second Team Offense	Javon Williams Jr.	Southern Illinois	RB	So.
Second Team Offense	Jacob Garrett	Southern Illinois	FB	Jr.
Second Team Offense	Jaxon Janke	South Dakota State	WR	So.
Second Team Offense	Tony Tate	Western Illinois	WR	Sr.
Second Team Offense	Caleb Vander Esch	South Dakota	WR	Sr.
Second Team Offense	Noah Gindorff	North Dakota State	TE	Jr.
Second Team Offense	Landon Bebee	Missouri State	OL	So.
Second Team Offense	Dan Becker	Youngstown State	OL	Jr.
Second Team Offense	Cody Mauch	North Dakota State	OL	Jr.
Second Team Offense	Mason McCormick	South Dakota State	OL	So.
Second Team Offense	Matt Waletzko	North Dakota	OL	Jr.
Second Team Defense	Jordan Berner	Southern Illinois	DL	Sr.
Second Team Defense	Kevin Ellis	Missouri State	DL	Jr.
Second Team Defense	Eric Johnson	Missouri State	DL	Sr.
Second Team Defense	Brantae Wells	Northern Iowa	DL	Sr.
Second Team Defense	Devon Krzanowski	North Dakota	LB	Jr.
Second Team Defense	Brock Mogensen	South Dakota	LB	So.
Second Team Defense	Bryson Strong	Southern Illinois	LB	Jr.
Second Team Defense	Tylar Wiltz	Missouri State	LB	Jr.
Second Team Defense	Austin Evans	Northern Iowa	DB	Sr.
Second Team Defense	Evan Holm	North Dakota	DB	Sr.
Second Team Defense	Zaire Jones	Youngstown State	DB	Sr.
Second Team Defense	Kyriq McDonald	Missouri State	DB	Jr.
Second Team Defense	Michael Tutsie	North Dakota State	DB	Jr.
Second Team Special Teams	Jose Pizano	Missouri State	PK	So.
Second Team Special Teams	Dalton Godfrey	South Dakota	LS	Jr.
Second Team Special Teams	Brady Schutt	South Dakota	P	Sr.
Second Team Special Teams	Christian Watson	North Dakota State	RS	Jr.

=== All-Newcomer Team ===
Award	Player	School	Position	Year
All-Newcomer Team Offense	Carson Camp	South Dakota	QB	Fr.
All-Newcomer Team Offense	Mark Gronowski	South Dakota State	QB	Fr.
All-Newcomer Team Offense	Tommy Schuster	North Dakota	QB	Fr.
All-Newcomer Team Offense	Pha'Leak Brown	Illinois State	RB	Fr.
All-Newcomer Team Offense	Isaiah Davis	South Dakota State	RB	Fr.
All-Newcomer Team Offense	Celdon Manning	Missouri State	RB	Fr.
All-Newcomer Team Offense	Jaleel McLaughlin	Youngstown State	RB	Jr.
All-Newcomer Team Offense	Bo Belquist	North Dakota	WR	Fr.
All-Newcomer Team Offense	Dallas Daniels	Western Illinois	WR	Jr.
All-Newcomer Team Offense	Quan Hampton	Northern Iowa	WR	Jr.
All-Newcomer Team Offense	Kyle Fourtenbary	Northern Iowa	TE	GS
Second Team Defense	Eli Mostaert	North Dakota State	DT	Fr.
Second Team Defense	Brayden Thomas	North Dakota State	DE	Sr.
Second Team Defense	Adam Bock	South Dakota State	LB	Fr.
Second Team Defense	Grant Dixon	Youngstown State	LB	Sr.
Second Team Defense	Devon Krzanowski	North Dakota	LB	Jr.
Second Team Defense	Montrae Braswell	Missouri State	DB	So.
Second Team Defense	Michael Lawson	Western Illinois	DB	Sr.
Second Team Defense	Kyriq McDonald	Missouri State	DB	Jr.
Second Team Defense	Benny Sapp III	Northern Iowa	DB	Jr.
Second Team Defense	Myles Harden	South Dakota	CB	Fr.
Second Team Defense	Keyon Martin	Youngstown State	CB	Fr.

=== National Awards ===
On April 28, 2021, STATS Perform released their list of finalists for the Walter Payton Award, Buck Buchanan Award, and the Jerry Rice Award, respectively.

Walter Payton Award
The Walter Payton Award is given to the best FCS offensive player. Here are the MVFC finalists:

- Pierre Strong Jr. (RB - South Dakota State)
- Otis Weah (RB - North Dakota)

There were no MVFC finalists for the Buck Buchanan Award.

Jerry Rice Award
The Jerry Rice Award is given to the best FCS freshman player. Here are the MVFC finalists:

- Mark Gronowski (QB - South Dakota State)
- Tommy Schuster (QB - North Dakota)

=== All-Americans ===
	AP 1st Team	AP 2nd Team	AFCA 1st Team	AFCA 2nd Team	STATS 1st Team	STATS 2nd Team	ADA	HERO
Avante Cox, WR, Southern Illinois		✓	✓		✓			
Christian Watson, WR, North Dakota State	✓				✓			✓
Cordell Volson, OL, North Dakota State	✓				✓		✓	✓
Don Gardner, DB, South Dakota State		✓				✓		
Drew Himmelman, OL, Illinois State					✓			✓
Garret Greenfield, OL, South Dakota State	✓		✓		✓			
Garrett Wegner, P, North Dakota State	✓				✓		✓	✓
Hunter Luepke, FB, North Dakota State					✓			
James Caesar, DB, Southern Illinois			✓					
James Kaczor, LB, North Dakota State				✓		✓		
Jared Brinkman, DL, Northern Iowa	✓		✓		✓			✓
Javon Williams Jr, WR, Southern Illinois					✓			
Logan Backhaus, LB, South Dakota State						✓		✓
Mason McCormick, OL, South Dakota State								✓
Nathan Nguon, OL, North Dakota		✓						
Otis Weah, RB, North Dakota	✓				✓			✓
Pierre Strong Jr., RB, South Dakota State			✓			✓		✓
Qua Brown, DB, Southern Illinois		✓				✓		✓
Ross Kennelly, LS, North Dakota State						✓		
Spencer Waege, DL, North Dakota State				✓				

== Home attendance ==
Team	Stadium	Capacity	Game 1	Game 2	Game 3	Game 4	Game 5	Game 6	Total	Average	% of Capacity
Illinois State	Hancock Stadium	13,391	1,853	1,853					3,706	1,853	13.8%
Missouri State	Robert W. Plaster Stadium	17,500	5,489†	3,147	3,581	2,948			15,165	3,791	21.7%
North Dakota	Alerus Center	12,283	3,176	3,638†	3,491	3,074‡			13,379	3,344	27.2%
North Dakota State	Fargodome	18,700	471	6,578	6,145	9,121†	8,762	3,587‡	34,664	5,777	30.9%
Northern Iowa	UNI-Dome	16,324	2,137†	1,920	1,608	2,037			7,702	1,925	11.8%
South Dakota	DakotaDome	9,100	2,051†						2,051	2,051	22.5%
South Dakota State	Dana J. Dykhouse Stadium	19,340	2,347	2,653	2,998‡	3,547‡	4,527†‡		16,072	3,214	16.6%
Southern Illinois	Saluki Stadium	15,000	0	2,400	2,400	2,400	2,400		9,600	1,920	12.8%
Western Illinois	Hanson Field	17,128	421	658	542	679			2,300	575	3.4%
Youngstown State	Stambaugh Stadium	20,630	2,128	1,901	2,159				6,188	2,062	9.9%

Bold - Exceed capacity
†Season High
‡FCS Playoff Game
Given the ongoing COVID-19 pandemic, attendance in all venues were severely limited. FCS Playoffs games were limited to 25% capacity as determined by the NCAA.

== 2021 NFL draft ==
The following list includes all MVFC players who were drafted in the 2021 NFL draft.

Player	Position	School	Draft Round	Round Pick	Overall Pick	Team	Notes
Trey Lance	QB	North Dakota State	1	3	3	San Francisco 49ers	from Houston via Miami
Dillon Radunz	OT	North Dakota State	2	21	53	Tennessee Titans	
Spencer Brown	OT	Northern Iowa	3	29	93	Buffalo Bills	
Elerson Smith	DE	Northern Iowa	4	11	116	New York Giants	

=== Undrafted Free Agents ===
Player	Position	School	Team
Cade Johnson	WR	South Dakota State	Seattle Seahawks
Romeo McKnight	DE	Illinois State	Cleveland Browns
Travis Toivonen	WR	North Dakota	Seattle Seahawks
Christian Uphoff	DB	Illinois State	Green Bay Packers

== Head coaches ==
Through May 16, 2021

Team	Head coach	Years at school	Overall record	Record at school	MVFC record	MVFC titles	FCS Playoff appearances	FCS Playoff record	National Titles
Illinois State	Brock Spack	12	85–53 (.616)	85–53 (.616)	54–38 (.587)	2	5	7–5 (.583)	0
Missouri State	Bobby Petrino (Note: Bobby Petrino coached in the FBS from 2003-06 and 2015-18 for Louisville, 2008-11 for Arkansas, as well as in 2013 for Western Kentucky.)	1	124–61 (.670)	5–5 (.500)	5–1 (.833)	1	1	0–1 (.000)	0
North Dakota	Bubba Schweigert (Note: Bubba Schweigert coached Minnesota Duluth of NCAA Division II from 2004-07. He also coached North Dakota while they were a part of the Big Sky Conference from 2014-17 and were independents in 2018 and 2019.)	7	64–55 (.538)	42–34 (.553)	4–1 (.800)	0	3	1–3 (.250)	0
North Dakota State	Matt Entz	2	21–3 (.875)	21–3 (.875)	13–2 (.867)	1	2	2–1 (.667)	1
Northern Iowa	Mark Farley	20	162–87 (.651)	162–87 (.651)	102–49 (.675)	7	12	16–12 (.571)	0
South Dakota	Bob Nielson (Note: Bob Nielson coached Western Illinois from 2013-15, which included a run in the playoffs that ended in the second round. Nielson also coached Minnesota-Duluth from 1999-2003 and 2008-12, that second stint included five consecutive NCAA Division II playoff appearances highlighted by 2 National Titles. In the first stint at MN-Duluth included his first Division II playoff appearance. Nielson also coached Wisconsin-Eau Claire from 1996-98 that included one NCAA Division III playoff run that ended in the semifinals. Before that, he coached Wartburg from 1991-95, which included two Division III playoff runs as well. His first head coaching job was at Ripon from 1989-90.)	5	208–109–1 (.656)	22–29 (.431)	15–21 (.417)	0	1	1–1 (.500)	2
South Dakota State	John Stiegelmeier (Note: John Stiegelmeier has coached South Dakota State since 1997, when the school was still part of NCAA Division II. While in Division II, the school did not achieve any playoff appearances.)	24	174–104 (.626)	174–104 (.626)	71–31 (.696)	2	10	11–10 (.524)	0
Southern Illinois	Nick Hill	5	23–32 (.418)	23–32 (.418)	13–25 (.342)	0	1	1–1 (.500)	0
Western Illinois	Jared Elliott	3	7–2 (.778)	7–22 (.241)	6–18 (.250)	0	0	0–0 (–)	0
Youngstown State	Doug Phillips	1	1–6 (.143)	1–6 (.143)	1–6 (.143)	0	0	0–0 (–)	0
