= 2020 Northern Iowa Panthers football team =

American college football season

2020 Northern Iowa Panthers football
- Conference: Missouri Valley Football Conference

Ranking
- STATS: No. 25
- FCS Coaches: No. 24
- Record: 3–4 (3–4 MVFC)
- Head coach: Mark Farley (20th season)
- Offensive coordinator: Ryan Mahaffey (3rd season)
- Defensive coordinator: Jeremiah Johnson (8th season)
- Home stadium: UNI-Dome

2020 Missouri Valley Football Conference standings
	Conf.			Overall
Team	W		L	W		L
No. 2 South Dakota State +^	5	–	1	8	–	2
No. 12 Missouri State +^	5	–	1	5	–	5
No. 7 North Dakota ^	4	–	1	5	–	2
No. 6 North Dakota State ^	5	–	2	7	–	3
No. 14 Southern Illinois ^	3	–	3	6	–	4
Northern Iowa	3	–	4	3	–	4
South Dakota	1	–	3	1	–	3
Illinois State†	1	–	3	1	–	3
Western Illinois†	1	–	5	1	–	5
Youngstown State	1	–	6	1	–	6
+ – Conference co-champions; ^ – FCS playoff participant; Note: Indiana State opted out of the spring season. † – Illinois State and Western Illinois opted out of the remainder of the spring season on March 21 and April 5, 2021, respectively.; Rankings from STATS Poll

The 2020 Northern Iowa Panthers football team represented the University of Northern Iowa as a member of the Missouri Valley Football Conference (MVFC) during the 2020–21 NCAA Division I FCS football season. Led by 20th-year head coach Mark Farley, the Panthers compiled an overall record of 3–4 with an identical mark in conference play, placing sixth in the MVFC. The team played home games at the UNI-Dome in Cedar Falls, Iowa.

== Schedule ==
Northern Iowa had a game scheduled against Iowa on September 5, which was later canceled before the start of the 2020 season.

Date	Time	Opponent	Rank	Site	TV	Result	Attendance
February 19	7:00 p.m.	No. 5 South Dakota State	No. 3	UNI-Dome; Cedar Falls, IA	PSN (Note: Panther Sports Network involves these channels (CFU Ch. 15/HD415; KCRG-TV Ch. 9.2; KCWI Ch. 23; KGCW Ch. 26, (NBC Sports Chicago or NBC Sports Chicago Plus)), ESPN+	L 20–24	2,137
February 27	11:00 a.m.	at Youngstown State	No. 5	Stambaugh Stadium; Youngstown, OH	ESPN+	W 21–0	2,128
March 6	4:00 p.m.	No. 15 Illinois State^{†}	No. 3	UNI-Dome; Cedar Falls, IA	PSN, SPN+	W 20–10	1,920
March 13	12:00 p.m.	at No. 10 Southern Illinois	No. 4	Saluki Stadium; Carbondale, IL	ESPN+	L 16–17	2,400
March 20	4:00 p.m.	Missouri State	No. 10	UNI-Dome; Cedar Falls, IA	PSN, ESPN+	L 6–13	1,608
March 27	7:00 p.m.	at Western Illinois	No. 22	Hanson Field; Macomb, IL	ESPN+	W 34–20	542
April 2	6:00 p.m.	South Dakota	No. 23	DakotaDome; Vermillion, SD	ESPN+	Canceled	
April 10	4:00 p.m.	No. 2 North Dakota State	No. 24	UNI-Dome; Cedar Falls, IA	ESPN+	L 20–23	2,037
^{†}Homecoming; Rankings from STATS Poll released prior to the game; All times are in Central time

== Players drafted into the NFL ==
Round	Pick	Player	Position	NFL club
3	93	Spencer Brown	OT	Buffalo Bills
4	116	Elerson Smith	OLB	New York Giants
