= 2020 North Dakota Fighting Hawks football team =

American college football season

2020 North Dakota Fighting Hawks football

FCS Playoffs Quarterfinals, L 21–34 vs. James Madison
- Conference: Missouri Valley Football Conference

Ranking
- STATS: No. 7
- FCS Coaches: No. 6
- Record: 5–2 (4–1 MVFC)
- Head coach: Bubba Schweigert (7th season)
- Offensive coordinator: Danny Freund (2nd season)
- Offensive scheme: Pistol
- Defensive coordinator: Brett Holinka (1st season)
- Base defense: 3–4
- Home stadium: Alerus Center

2020 Missouri Valley Football Conference standings
	Conf.			Overall
Team	W		L	W		L
No. 2 South Dakota State +^	5	–	1	8	–	2
No. 12 Missouri State +^	5	–	1	5	–	5
No. 7 North Dakota ^	4	–	1	5	–	2
No. 6 North Dakota State ^	5	–	2	7	–	3
No. 14 Southern Illinois ^	3	–	3	6	–	4
Northern Iowa	3	–	4	3	–	4
South Dakota	1	–	3	1	–	3
Illinois State†	1	–	3	1	–	3
Western Illinois†	1	–	5	1	–	5
Youngstown State	1	–	6	1	–	6
+ – Conference co-champions; ^ – FCS playoff participant; Note: Indiana State opted out of the spring season. † – Illinois State and Western Illinois opted out of the remainder of the spring season on March 21 and April 5, 2021, respectively.; Rankings from STATS Poll

The 2020 North Dakota Fighting Hawks football team represented the University of North Dakota during the 2020–21 NCAA Division I FCS football season. Led by seventh-year head coach Bubba Schweigert, they played their home games at the Alerus Center as first-year members of the Missouri Valley Football Conference.

== Schedule ==
North Dakota's game scheduled against Valparaiso was canceled on July 27 due to the Pioneer Football League's decision to play a conference-only schedule due to the COVID-19 pandemic.

Date	Time	Opponent	Rank	Site	TV	Result	Attendance
February 20	12:00 p.m.	No. 24 Southern Illinois		Alerus Center; Grand Forks, ND	ESPN+	W 44–21	3,176
February 27	12:00 p.m.	No. 3 South Dakota State	No. 14	Alerus Center; Grand Forks, ND	ESPN+	W 28–17	3,638
March 4	5:00 p.m.	No. 20 South Dakota	No. 4	Alerus Center; Grand Forks, ND (Sitting Bull Trophy)	ESPN+	W 21–10	3,491
March 13	12:00 p.m.	at Western Illinois	No. 3	Hanson Field; Macomb, IL	ESPN+	W 38–21	658
March 20	2:30 p.m.	at No. 4 North Dakota State	No. 2	Fargodome; Fargo, ND (Nickel Trophy)	ESPN+	L 13–34	9,121
April 3	11:00 a.m.	No. 19 Missouri State	No. 6	Alerus Center; Grand Forks, ND	ESPN+	Canceled	
April 10	12:00 p.m.	at Illinois State	No. 6	Hancock Stadium; Normal, IL	ESPN+	Canceled (Note: On March 21, 2021, Illinois State announced that it would opt-out of the remainder of the 2021 spring season due to safety concerns related to the COVID-19 pandemic.)	
April 17		at Youngstown State	No. 6	Stambaugh Stadium; Youngstown, OH	ESPN+	Canceled	
April 24	2:00 p.m.	No. 12 Missouri State	No. 7	Alerus Center; Grand Forks, ND (NCAA Division I First Round)	ESPN3	W 44–10	
May 2	5:00 p.m.	at No. 1 James Madison	No. 7	Bridgeforth Stadium; Harrisburg, VA (NCAA Division I Quarterfinal)	ESPN2	L 21–34	
Rankings from STATS Poll released prior to the game; All times are in Central time
