= 2020 North Dakota State Bison football team =

American college football season

2020 North Dakota State Bison football

NCAA Division I Quarterfinal, L 20–24 vs. Sam Houston State
- Conference: Missouri Valley Football Conference

Ranking
- STATS: No. 6
- FCS Coaches: No. 7
- Record: 7–3 (5–2 MVFC)
- Head coach: Matt Entz (2nd season)
- Offensive coordinator: Tyler Roehl (2nd season)
- Offensive scheme: Pro-style
- Defensive coordinator: David Braun (2nd season)
- Base defense: Multiple 4–3
- Home stadium: Fargodome

2020 Missouri Valley Football Conference standings
	Conf.			Overall
Team	W		L	W		L
No. 2 South Dakota State +^	5	–	1	8	–	2
No. 12 Missouri State +^	5	–	1	5	–	5
No. 7 North Dakota ^	4	–	1	5	–	2
No. 6 North Dakota State ^	5	–	2	7	–	3
No. 14 Southern Illinois ^	3	–	3	6	–	4
Northern Iowa	3	–	4	3	–	4
South Dakota	1	–	3	1	–	3
Illinois State†	1	–	3	1	–	3
Western Illinois†	1	–	5	1	–	5
Youngstown State	1	–	6	1	–	6
+ – Conference co-champions; ^ – FCS playoff participant; Note: Indiana State opted out of the spring season. † – Illinois State and Western Illinois opted out of the remainder of the spring season on March 21 and April 5, 2021, respectively.; Rankings from STATS Poll

The 2020 North Dakota State Bison football team represented North Dakota State University in the 2020–21 NCAA Division I FCS football season. They were led by second-year head coach Matt Entz. The team played in the Fargodome in Fargo, North Dakota, for the 28th season as members of the Missouri Valley Football Conference (MVFC). They entered the season as defending national champions, having won eight of the prior nine FCS titles.

== Schedule ==
NDSU had games scheduled against Oregon (September 5, rescheduled to 2028), Drake (September 12, rescheduled to 2022), and North Carolina A&T (September 19, rescheduled to 2022) that were postponed before the season due to the COVID-19 pandemic.

Date	Time	Opponent	Rank	Site	TV	Result	Attendance
October 3	2:30 p.m.	Central Arkansas*	No. 1	Fargodome; Fargo, ND	ESPN+	W 39–28	471
February 21	2:30 p.m.	Youngstown State	No. 1	Fargodome; Fargo, ND (Harvest Bowl)	ESPN+	W 25–7	6,578
February 27	2:30 p.m.	at Southern Illinois	No. 1	Saluki Stadium; Carbondale, IL	ESPN+	L 14–38	2,400
March 6	2:00 p.m.	at Missouri State	No. 6	Robert W. Plaster Stadium; Springfield, MO	ESPN+	W 25–0	3,147
March 13	2:30 p.m.	No. 22 Illinois State	No. 5	Fargodome; Fargo, ND	ESPN+	W 21–13	6,145
March 20	2:30 p.m.	No. 2 North Dakota	No. 4	Fargodome; Fargo, ND	ESPN+	W 34–13	9,121
~~March 27~~	~~2:00 p.m.~~	~~at South Dakota~~	No. 2	~~DakotaDome~~; ~~Vermillion, SD~~	~~ESPN+~~	Canceled	
April 10	4:00 p.m.	at No. 24 Northern Iowa	No. 2	UNI-Dome; Cedar Falls, IA	ESPN+	W 23–20	2,037
April 17	2:30 p.m.	No. 4 South Dakota State	No. 2	Fargodome; Fargo, ND (Dakota Marker)	ESPN+	L 17–27	8,762
April 24	3:30 p.m.	No. 9 Eastern Washington	No. 6	Fargodome; Fargo, ND (FCS Playoffs First Round)	ESPN3	W 42–20	3,587
May 2	2:00 p.m.	at No. 4 Sam Houston State	No. 6	Bowers Stadium; Huntsville, TX (FCS Playoffs Quarterfinals)	ESPN	L 20–24	4,984
*Non-conference game; Rankings from STATS Poll released prior to the game; All times are in Central time

== Personnel ==
=== Roster ===
2020 North Dakota State Bison Football
Quarterback: 5 Trey Lance – sophomore (6′3, 224); 7 Jayden Johannsen - (redshirt) freshman (6′2, 193); 8 Zeb Noland – senior (6′2, 222); 10 Logan Graetz – (redshirt) freshman (6′4, 209); 16 Noah Sanders – junior (6′3, 217); - Cam Miller – freshman (6′1, 205); Tailback: 18 Adam Cofield – senior (5′11, 207); 21 Jalen Bussey – (redshirt) freshman (5′5, 159); 22 Seth Wilson – junior (5′10, 195); 24 Kobe Johnson – sophomore (5′9, 183); 30 Saybein Clark – sophomore (6′1, 206); - TK Marshall – freshman (5'11, 189); - Dominic Gonnella – freshman (5′11, 190); - Nathan Goldade – freshman (5′10, 202); Fullback: 44 Hunter Luepke – sophomore (6′1, 246); 49 Logan Hofstedt – (redshirt) freshman (6′1, 246); - Jesse Hastings – freshman (5′11, 229); Wide receiver: 1 Christian Watson – junior (6′3, 206); 6 Giancarlo Volpentesta – (redshirt) freshman (6′0, 193); 11 Phoenix Sproles – junior (5′11, 188); 12 Braylon Henderson – (redshirt) freshman (5′8, 179); 15 Kaden Kuntz – (redshirt) freshman (5′8, 176); 17 Phoenix Sproles – sophomore (6′6, 194); 22 Jake Lippe – (redshirt) freshman (6′2, 204); 29 Adrian Adams – (redshirt) freshman (6′0, 172); 32 DJ Stewart – sophomore (5′11, 190); 80 Andy Voyen – junior (6′2, 208); 84 Trevor Heit – senior (5′9, 180); 86 Peter Isais – junior (5′11, 181); 89 Cole Jacob – senior (6′1, 201); - RaJa Nelson – freshman (5′8, 175); - DJ Hart – freshman (6′0, 180); - Joseph Deyak – freshman (6′2, 190); - Tyler Terhark – freshman (6′2, 192); Tight end: 40 Travis Yohnke – (redshirt) freshman (6′4, 252); 43 Zach Gottwalt – (redshirt) freshman (6′5, 218); 46 Austin Avery – junior (6′3, 248); 81 Josh Babicz – junior (6′6, 252); 85 Jaden Klabo – (redshirt) freshman (6′4, 211); 87 Noah Gindorff – junior (6′6, 266); - Joe Stoffel – freshman (6′3, 234); - Jack Bram – freshman (6′3, 215); - Andre Carrier – freshman (6′3, 197)	Offensive lineman: 57 Zach Willis - C – senior (6′3, 300); 58 Josh Howieson - OT – senior (6′5, 310); 59 Karson Schoening - C – senior (6′5, 302); 61 Zach Kubas - OG – senior (6′4, 298); 63 Jake Kubas - OG – sophomore (6′3, 298); 64 Jake Rock - OT – (redshirt) freshman (6′6, 294); 66 Nash Jensen - OG – junior (6′4, 331); 67 Cordell Volson - OT – senior (6′6, 312); 68 Nick Radunz - OL – junior (6′4, 288); 69 Quinn Alo - OG – senior (6′2, 301); 70 Cody Mauch - OT – junior (6′4, 286); 71 Brandon Westberg - C – (redshirt) freshman (6′3, 283); 72 Jalen Sundell - OT – sophomore (6′5, 293); 75 Dillon Radunz - OT – senior (6′6, 301); 76 Hunter Poncius - OT – (redshirt) freshman (6′8, 293); 77 Bryan Nohava - OG – sophomore (6′4, 290); - Mason Miller - OT – freshman (6′6, 232); - Grey Zabel - OT – freshman (6′5, 247); - Hayden Johnston - OL – freshman (6′1, 259); Defensive lineman: 54 Jake Kava – DE – sophomore (6′1, 236); 56 Justice Kelly – DE – senior (6′3, 239); 60 Lane Tucker – DT – junior (6′4, 278); 62 Dylan Evans – DT – sophomore (6′4, 287); 64 Reed Ryan – DE – (redshirt) freshman (6′2, 238); 73 Eli Mostaert – DT – (redshirt) freshman (6′3, 275); 74 Will Mostaert – DE – (redshirt) freshman (6′3, 253); 90 Tony Pierce – DE – sophomore (6′0, 228); 93 Logan McCormick – DE – junior (6′2, 247); 94 Costner Ching – DT – junior (6′3, 282); 95 Brendan Cook – DE – sophomore (6′3, 244); 96 Javier Derritt – DT – (redshirt) freshman (6′1, 280); 97 Bartholomew Ogbu – DE – junior (6′2, 246); 98 Matt Biegler - DT – senior (6′3, 283); 99 Spencer Waege – DE – junior (6′5, 270); - Seth Anderson - DE – freshman (6′5, 253); - Nolan Jacobs - DT – freshman (6′2, 243); - Loshiaka Roques - DE – freshman (6′3, 215); - Bryce Friday - DT – freshman (6′4, 240); - Joe Kava - DT – freshman (5′11, 229); - Trey Steinbach - DE – freshman (6′3, 220)	Linebacker: 31 Jasir Cox – junior (6′0, 205); 34 Juanye Tillman – sophomore (5′11, 238); 43 Beau Pauly – senior (6′2, 218); 45 Mitchell Kartes – sophomore (5'11, 208); 47 Luke Weerts – sophomore (6'1, 217); 48 Mark Stumpf – sophomore (6'2, 221); 49 Nick Kubitz – (redshirt) freshman (6'2, 213); 50 Dylan Hendricks – (redshirt) freshman (6′3, 231); 51 Mason Hofstedt – junior (6′0, 218); 52 Jackson Hankey – junior (6′1, 220); 55 Aaron Mercadel – senior (5′11, 218); - Oscar Benson – freshman (6′0, 180); - Cole Wisniewski – freshman (6′3, 189); Cornerbacks: 13 Anthony Coleman – (redshirt) freshman (5′9, 176); 14 Josh Hayes – senior (5′11, 186); 33 Destin Talbert – junior (5′11, 182); 35 Jayden Price – sophomore (6′0, 187); 39 Jenaro Wathum-Ocama – (redshirt) freshman (6′0, 188); - Courtney Eubanks – freshman (5′10, 175); - Marques Sigle – freshman (5′10, 170); Safeties: 10 Dom Jones - FS – (redshirt) freshman (6′2, 189); 18 Cam Smith - FS – (redshirt) freshman (5′11, 182); 20 Julian Wlodarczyk - SS – sophomore (6′3, 204); 25 Michael Tutsie - SS – junior (5′10, 197); 26 James Kaczor - SS – junior (6′0, 207); 27 Dawson Weber - FS – junior (6′2, 189); 46 Caleb Beebe - SS – (redshirt) freshman (5′10, 179); - Tyson Gordon – freshman (6′2, 177); - Ty Satter – freshman (6′1, 167); - Sam Jung – freshman (5′10, 175); Placekicker: 15 Will Cardinal – (redshirt) freshman (6′2, 192) (+P); 36 Griffin Crosa – sophomore (6′1, 170); 37 Jake Reinholz – junior (6′2, 217); - Nathan Whiting – freshman (5′11, 201); Punter: 38 Garret Wegner – senior (6′0, 196); Long snappers: 41 Ross Kennelly – senior (5′11, 223); 85 Hunter Brozio – (redshirt) freshman (6′0, 232)

== Game summaries ==
=== Regular season ===
==== Central Arkansas ====
Central Arkansas Bears (2-1) vs. North Dakota State Bison (0-0)

Quarter	1	2	3	4	Total
No. 11 Bears	3	3	14	8	28
No. 1 Bison	0	10	8	21	39

at Fargodome, Fargo, ND

- Date: October 3, 2020
- Game time: 2:30 p.m. (CT)
- Game weather: Indoors; 70 °F (21 °C)
- Game attendance: 471
- TV: ESPN+

Statistics	Central Arkansas	North Dakota State
First downs	14	26
Plays–yards	63-297	76-425
Rushes–yards	25-71	46-276
Passing yards	226	149
Passing: comp–att–int	25-38-2	15-30-1
Time of possession	26:38	33:22

Team	Category	Player	Statistics
Central Arkansas	Passing	Breylin Smith	25/38, 226 yds, 3 TD, 2 INT
Central Arkansas	Rushing	Breylin Smith	10 car, 29 yds
Central Arkansas	Receiving	Tyler Hudson	4 rec, 58 yds, TD
North Dakota State	Passing	Trey Lance	15/30, 149 yds, 2 TD, INT
North Dakota State	Rushing	Trey Lance	15 car, 143 yds, 2 TD
North Dakota State	Receiving	Braylon Henderson	3 rec, 36 yds

Scoring summary

Quarter	Time	Drive			Team	Scoring information	Score	
Quarter	Time	Plays	Yards	TOP	Team	Scoring information	UCA	NDSU
1st	8:26	4	-1	1:39	UCA	33-yard field goal by Hayden Ray (#53)	3	0
2nd	11:53	7	23	2:11	UCA	41-yard field goal by Hayden Ray (#53)	6	0
2nd	9:00	7	75	2:53	NDSU	Josh Babicz (#81) 13-yard touchdown reception from Trey Lance (#5), Jake Reinholz (#37) kick good	6	7
2nd	2:32	9	50	4:23	NDSU	27-yard field goal by Jake Reinholz (#37)	6	10
3rd	14:13	2	75	0:47	NDSU	Trey Lance (#5) 54-yard touchdown run, 2-point Rush Good	6	18
3rd	12:47	5	75	1:26	UCA	Tyler Hudson (#1) 22-yard touchdown reception from Breylin Smith (#3), Hayden Ray (#53) kick good	13	18
3rd	UCA	5	43	1:13	UCA	Lujuan Winningham (#5) 3-yard touchdown reception from Breylin Smith (#3), Hayden Ray (#53) kick good	20	18
4th	13:21	8	56	3:53	NDSU	Trey Lance (#5) 14-yard touchdown run, Jake Reinholz (#37) kick good	20	25
4th	10:35	7	79	2:41	UCA	Lujuan Winningham (#5) 11-yard touchdown reception from Breylin Smith (#3), 2-point rush good	28	25
4th	7:35	7	75	3:00	NDSU	Hunter Luepke (#44) 23-yard touchdown reception from Trey Lance (#5), Jake Reinholz (#37) kick good	28	32
4th	1:51	9	67	3:51	NDSU	Hunter Luepke (#44) 13-yard touchdown run, Jake Reinholz (#37) kick good	28	39
"TOP" = time of possession. For other American football terms, see Glossary of American football.							28	39

==== Youngstown State ====
Youngstown State Penguins (0-1) vs. North Dakota State Bison (1-0)

Quarter	1	2	3	4	Total
Penguins	0	0	7	0	7
No. 1 Bison	8	3	7	7	25

at Fargodome, Fargo, ND

- Date: February 21, 2021
- Game time: 2:30 p.m. (CT)
- Game weather: Indoors; 70 °F (21 °C)
- Game attendance: 6,578
- TV: ESPN+

Statistics	Youngstown State	North Dakota State
First downs	12	18
Plays–yards	56-171	58-317
Rushes–yards	34-51	40-243
Passing yards	120	74
Passing: comp–att–int	12-22-0	9-18-0
Time of possession	31:03	28:57

Team	Category	Player	Statistics
Youngstown State	Passing	Mark Waid	8/11, 75 yds, TD
Youngstown State	Rushing	Mark Waid	11 car, 26 yds
Youngstown State	Receiving	Natavious Payne	2 rec, 39 yds
North Dakota State	Passing	Zeb Noland	9/18, 74 yds
North Dakota State	Rushing	Kobe Johnson	16 car, 114 yds, TD
North Dakota State	Receiving	Cole Jacob	3 rec, 28 yds

Scoring summary

Quarter	Time	Drive			Team	Scoring information	Score	
Quarter	Time	Plays	Yards	TOP	Team	Scoring information	YSU	NDSU
1st	4:20	9	63	5:12	NDSU	Kobe Johnson (#4) 15-yard touchdown run, 2-point rush good	0	8
2nd	9:05	7	30	3:08	NDSU	28-yard field goal by Jake Reinholz (#37)	0	11
3rd	8:29	6	89	2:38	NDSU	Jalen Bussey (#21) 22-yard touchdown run, Jake Reinholz (#37) kick good	0	18
3rd	0:18	15	75	8:11	YSU	Jake Coates (#10) 12-yard touchdown reception from Mark Waid (#7), Colt McFadden (#19) kick good	7	18
4th	7:10	9	60	4:22	NDSU	Jalen Bussey (#21) 7-yard touchdown run, Jake Reinholz (#37) kick good	7	25
"TOP" = time of possession. For other American football terms, see Glossary of American football.							7	25

==== Southern Illinois ====
North Dakota State Bison (2-0) vs. Southern Illinois Salukis (1-1)

Quarter	1	2	3	4	Total
No. 1 Bison	0	7	0	7	14
Salukis	3	14	0	21	38

at Saluki Stadium, Carbondale, IL

- Date: February 27, 2021
- Game time: 2:30 p.m. (CT)
- Game weather: Cloudy; 52 °F (11 °C); Wind: SSE 6 MPH
- Game attendance: 2,400
- TV: ESPN+

Statistics	North Dakota State	Southern Illinois
First downs	12	25
Plays–yards	45-268	73-443
Rushes–yards	21-109	48-170
Passing yards	159	273
Passing: comp–att–int	13-24-1	18-25-0
Time of possession	18:34	41:26

Team	Category	Player	Statistics
North Dakota State	Passing	Zeb Noland	13/24, 159 yds, TD, INT
North Dakota State	Rushing	Jalen Bussey	3 car, 72 yds
North Dakota State	Receiving	Jake Lippe	3 rec, 53 yds, TD
Southern Illinois	Passing	Nic Baker	17/23, 254 yds, TD
Southern Illinois	Rushing	Romeir Elliott	18 car, 89 yds, 2 TD
Southern Illinois	Receiving	Avante Cox	7 rec, 138 yds

Scoring summary

Quarter	Time	Drive			Team	Scoring information	Score	
Quarter	Time	Plays	Yards	TOP	Team	Scoring information	NDSU	SIU
1st	0:40	12	49	6:43	SIU	39-yard field goal by Nico Gualdoni (#99)	0	3
2nd	7:24	12	93	6:50	SIU	Romeir Elliott (#1) 3-yard touchdown run, Nico Gualdoni (#99) kick good	0	10
2nd	0:55	7	74	4:25	SIU	Javon Williams Jr. (#15) 1-yard touchdown run, Nico Gualdoni (#99) kick good	0	17
2nd	0:00	6	80	0:52	NDSU	Jake Lippe (#19) 37-yard touchdown reception from Zeb Noland (#8), Jake Reinholz (#37) kick good	7	17
4th	13:41	5	51	2:32	SIU	Landon Lenoir (#17) 7-yard touchdown reception from Nic Baker (#8), Nico Gualdoni (#99) kick good	7	24
4th	11:42	4	13	1:27	SIU	Javon Williams Jr. (#15) 3-yard touchdown run, Nico Gualdoni (#99) kick good	7	31
4th	3:07	11	80	7:18	SIU	Romeir Elliott (#1) 20-yard touchdown run, Nico Gualdoni (#99) kick good	7	38
4th	2:16	3	75	0:51	NDSU	Zeb Noland (#8) 5-yard touchdown run, Jake Reinholz (#37) kick good	14	38
"TOP" = time of possession. For other American football terms, see Glossary of American football.							14	38

==== Missouri State ====
North Dakota State Bison (2-1) vs. Missouri State Bears (1-3)

Quarter	1	2	3	4	Total
No. 6 Bison	7	18	0	0	25
Bears	0	0	0	0	0

at Plaster Stadium, Springfield, MO

- Date: March 6, 2021
- Game time: 2:00 p.m. (CT)
- Game weather: Sunny; 58 °F (14 °C); WSW 3 MPH
- Game attendance: 3,147
- TV: ESPN+

Statistics	North Dakota State	Missouri State
First downs	15	14
Plays–yards	63-407	63-221
Rushes–yards	48-272	34-63
Passing yards	135	158
Passing: comp–att–int	10-15-1	16-29-0
Time of possession	33:56	26:04

Team	Category	Player	Statistics
North Dakota State	Passing	Zeb Noland (#8)	10/15, 135 yds, 2 TD, INT
North Dakota State	Rushing	Jalen Bussey	10 car, 98 yds, TD
North Dakota State	Receiving	Braylon Henderson	1 rec, 81 yds, TD
Missouri State	Passing	Jaden Johnson	13/21, 132 yds
Missouri State	Rushing	Tobias Little	8 car, 46 yds
Missouri State	Receiving	Damoriea Vick	6 rec, 73 yds

Scoring summary

Quarter	Time	Drive			Team	Scoring information	Score	
Quarter	Time	Plays	Yards	TOP	Team	Scoring information	NDSU	MOST
1st	1:49	12	71	5:54	NDSU	Noah Gindorff (#87) 7-yard touchdown reception from Zeb Noland (#8), Jake Reinholz (#37) kick good	7	0
2nd	6:24	4	65	1:53	NDSU	Jalen Bussey (#21) 53-yard touchdown run, 2-point rush good	15	0
2nd	1:25	7	44	3:30	NDSU	38-yard field goal by Jake Reinholz (#37)	18	0
2nd	0:08	2	81	0:17	NDSU	Braylon Henderson (#12) 81-yard touchdown reception from Zeb Noland (#8), Jake Reinholz (#37) kick good	25	0
"TOP" = time of possession. For other American football terms, see Glossary of American football.							25	0

==== Illinois State ====
Illinois State Redbirds (0-2) vs. North Dakota State Bison (3-1)

Quarter	1	2	3	4	Total
No. 22 Redbirds	0	0	7	6	13
No. 5 Bison	14	0	0	7	21

at Fargodome, Fargo, ND

- Date: March 13, 2021
- Game time: 2:30 p.m. (CT)
- Game weather: Indoors; 70 °F (21 °C)
- Game attendance: 6,145
- TV: ESPN+

Statistics	Illinois State	North Dakota State
First downs	13	15
Plays–yards	67-257	59-287
Rushes–yards	41-133	39-154
Passing yards	124	133
Passing: comp–att–int	9-26-1	11-20-2
Time of possession	29:54	30:06

Team	Category	Player	Statistics
Illinois State	Passing	Bryce Jefferson	9/26, 124 yds, TD, INT
Illinois State	Rushing	Nigel White	15 car, 87 yds
Illinois State	Receiving	Austin Nagel	2 rec, 51 yds
North Dakota State	Passing	Zeb Noland	6/13, 72 yds, 2 INT
North Dakota State	Rushing	Cam Miller	11 car, 57 yds, TD
North Dakota State	Receiving	Christian Watson	4 rec, 93 yds

Scoring summary

Quarter	Time	Drive			Team	Scoring information	Score	
Quarter	Time	Plays	Yards	TOP	Team	Scoring information	ILST	NDSU
1st	11:20				NDSU	Punt returned 85 yards for touchdown by Jayden Price (#23), Jake Reinholz (#37) kick good	0	7
1st	5:37	8	67	3:37	NDSU	Kobe Johnson (#4) 15-yard touchdown run, Griffin Crosa (#39) kick good	0	14
3rd	6:40	7	47	3:01	ILST	Tanner Taula (#11) 4-yard touchdown reception from Bryce Jefferson (#5), Aidan Bresnahan (#40) kick good	7	14
4th	11:59	10	80	4:32	ILST	Tyler Pennington (#37) 1-yard touchdown run, Aidan Bresnahan (#40) kick blocked	13	14
4th	3:39	13	84	8:13	NDSU	Cam Miller (#7) 6-yard touchdown run, Griffin Crosa (#39) kick good	13	21
"TOP" = time of possession. For other American football terms, see Glossary of American football.							13	21

==== North Dakota ====
North Dakota Fighting Hawks (4-0) vs. North Dakota State Bison (4-1)

Quarter	1	2	3	4	Total
No. 2 Fighting Hawks	6	0	7	0	13
No. 4 Bison	7	14	7	6	34

at Fargodome, Fargo, ND

- Date: March 20, 2021
- Game time: 2:30 p.m. (CT)
- Game weather: Indoors; 70 °F (21 °C)
- Game attendance: 9,121
- TV: ESPN+

Statistics	North Dakota	North Dakota State
First downs	14	21
Plays–yards	51-304	73-456
Rushes–yards	24-161	54-316
Passing yards	143	140
Passing: comp–att–int	13-27-1	8-19-2
Time of possession	23:23	36:37

Team	Category	Player	Statistics
North Dakota	Passing	Tommy Schuster	13/26, 143 yds, TD, INT
North Dakota	Rushing	Otis Weah	13 car, 129 yds, TD
North Dakota	Receiving	Bo Belquist	3 rec, 39 yds, TD
North Dakota State	Passing	Zeb Noland	5/13, 127 yds, TD, 2 INT
North Dakota State	Rushing	Hunter Luepke	28 car, 190 yds, 3 TD
North Dakota State	Receiving	Christian Watson	2 rec, 83 yds, TD

Scoring summary

Quarter	Time	Drive			Team	Scoring information	Score	
Quarter	Time	Plays	Yards	TOP	Team	Scoring information	UND	NDSU
1st	14:10	4	75	0:50	NDSU	Hunter Luepke (#44) 55-yard touchdown run, Griffin Crosa (#39) kick good	0	7
1st	4:47	1	74	0:12	UND	Otis Weah (#26) 74-yard touchdown run, Adam Stage (#45) kick no good	6	7
2nd	11:11	16	82	8:31	NDSU	Hunter Luepke (#44) 8-yard touchdown run, Griffin Crosa (#39) kick good	6	14
2nd	1:06	2	72	0:29	NDSU	Christian Watson (#1) 63-yard touchdown reception from Zeb Noland (#8), Griffin Crosa (#39) kick good	6	21
3rd	12:01	6	55	2:53	UND	Bo Belquist (#1) 21-yard touchdown reception from Tommy Schuster (#2), Adam Stage (#45) kick good	13	21
3rd	4:38	14	75	7:23	NDSU	Hunter Luepke (#44) 5-yard touchdown run, Griffin Crosa (#39) kick good	13	28
4th	14:05	6	18	2:35	NDSU	41-yard field goal by Griffin Crosa (#39)	13	31
4th	7:57	4	2	2:07	NDSU	35-yard field goal by Griffin Crosa (#39)	13	34
"TOP" = time of possession. For other American football terms, see Glossary of American football.							13	34

== Ranking movements ==
Ranking movements Legend: ██ Increase in ranking ██ Decrease in ranking
	Week										
Poll	Pre	1	2	3	4	5	6	7	8	9	Final
STATS	1	1	6	5	4	2	2	2	2	6	5
Coaches	Not released				4	3	3	3	3	7	5

== Players drafted into the NFL ==
Round	Pick	Player	Position	NFL team
1	3	Trey Lance	QB	San Francisco 49ers
2	53	Dillon Radunz	OT	Tennessee Titans
