= 2020 Sam Houston State Bearkats football team =

American college football season

2020 Sam Houston State Bearkats football

NCAA Division I champion Southland champion

NCAA Division I Championship Game, W 23–21 vs. South Dakota State
- Conference: Southland Conference

Ranking
- STATS: No. 1
- FCS Coaches: No. 1
- Record: 10–0 (6–0 Southland)
- Head coach: K. C. Keeler (7th season)
- Offensive coordinator: Ryan Carty (3rd season)
- Offensive scheme: No-huddle spread option
- Defensive coordinator: Clayton Carlin (4th season)
- Base defense: 4–2–5
- Home stadium: Bowers Stadium

2020 Southland Conference football standings
	Conf.			Overall
Team	W		L	W		L
No. 1 Sam Houston State $^	6	–	0	10	–	0
No. 20 Southeastern Louisiana	4	–	2	4	–	3
No. 23 Nicholls	3	–	3	4	–	3
Incarnate Word	3	–	3	3	–	3
Lamar	2	–	4	2	–	4
McNeese State*	2	–	4	3	–	4
Northwestern State	1	–	5	1	–	5
$ – Conference champion; ^ – FCS playoff participant; * – Ineligible for FCS postseason play due to NCAA sanctions Note: Abilene Christian, Central Arkansas, Houston Baptist, and Stephen F. Austin played only in the fall and opted out of the spring season.; Rankings from STATS Poll

The 2020 Sam Houston State Bearkats football team represented Sam Houston State University in the 2020–21 NCAA Division I FCS football season as a member of the Southland Conference. The Bearkats were led by seventh-year head coach K. C. Keeler and played their home games at Bowers Stadium.

== Background ==
In August 2020, the Southland Conference canceled all fall sports due to the COVID-19 pandemic in the United States, with the hope that sports would be playable in Spring 2021. That decision canceled all 12 games of the Bearkats' original schedule, putting their season on hold indefinitely. A revised schedule for Spring 2021 was later released.

== Preseason ==
=== Preseason poll ===
The Southland Conference released their spring preseason poll in January 2021. The Bearkats were picked to finish second in the conference. In addition, nine Bearkats were chosen to the Preseason All-Southland Team.

=== Preseason All–Southland Teams ===
Offense

1st Team

- Donovan Williams – Running back, JR
- Colby Thomas – Offensive lineman, SR
- Matt McRobert – Punter, RS-SR

2nd Team

- Eleasah Anderson – Offensive lineman, RS-JR

Defense

1st Team

- Trace Mascorro – Defensive lineman, SR
- Joseph Wallace – Defensive lineman, SR

2nd Team

- Jevon Leon – Defensive lineman, SO
- Zyon McCollum – Defensive back, SR
- Jaylen Thomas – Defensive back, SR

== Roster ==
2020 Sam Houston State Bearkats football team roster
Players
Coaches
Offense

Pos.	#	Name	Class
WR	2	Ife Adeyi	So
QB	3	Eric Schmid	Jr
RB	4	Ramon Jefferson	Jr
QB	5	Keegan Shoemaker	So
RB	6	Noah Smith	So
WR	7	Dewaylon Ingram	Jr
QB	10	Mike Dare	GS
QB	11	Gunner Capps	Fr
WR	12	Jequez Ezzard	GS
WR	14	Ryan Humphries	So
WR	15	Tony Williams	Jr
TE	16	Isaac Schley	Sr
QB	17	Matthew Southern	Fr
QB	18	Trapper Pannell	Fr
WR	19	Brennon Tibbs	Sr
RB	20	Daryon Triche	Fr
WR	23	Adrian Murdaugh	Fr
RB	24	Harrison Smith	Fr
RB	25	Donovan Williams	Jr
RB	26	Kyran Jackson	Sr
TE	27	Dalton Meyer	So
RB	28	Charles Crawford III	Fr
RB	29	Jacob Berry	Jr
WR	36	Wyatt Huffman	So
OL	51	Jalen North	Fr
OL	52	Colby Thomas	Sr
OL	56	Daniel Melendez	Jr
OL	57	Ethan Hagler	So
OL	59	Will Jones	Fr
OL	60	Seth Kohlscheen	Fr
OL	61	Noah Barboza	So
OL	62	Anthony Turrubiartes	Jr
OL	64	Ben Bankston	Jr
OL	65	Ylijaah Hall	So
OL	66	D'Ary Patton	Fr
OL	70	Migel Garcia	GS
OL	71	Walter Harris III	Sr
OL	73	Moses Johnson	Jr
OL	74	Kevin Brown	Jr
OL	75	Eleasah Anderson	Jr
OL	76	Prince Pines	So
OL	77	Peyton Fifield	So
WR	80	Dee Bownes	So
WR	81	Derrick Rose	Fr
WR	83	Quan Ardoin	Jr
TE	84	Keontae Richardson	Fr
TE	85	Rowdy Godwin	Fr
TE	86	Jarvis Brooks	Sr
WR	88	Chandler Harvin	So
WR	89	Cody Chrest	GS

Defense

Pos.	#	Name	Class
LB	1	Trevor Williams	Jr
DB	5	Darrel Hawkins-Williams	So
LB	8	Quentin Brown	Jr
DB	9	Jaylen Thomas	Sr
DB	13	Isaiah Downes	Jr
DB	17	Ke'Shon Murray	Jr
DB	21	Kameryn Alexander	So
DB	22	Zyon McCollum	Sr
DB	23	Tristin McCollum	Sr
S	24	Evrin Hawkins	Jr
DB	25	Truman Bexley	Fr
DB	26	RJ Bendert	Fr
DB	27	Savien Arnett	Fr
LB	28	Rance McInnis	Fr
LB	29	Danzell Sims	Sr
DB	30	Taylen Blaylock	Fr
S	31	Immanuel Sutton	So
LB	33	Markel Perry	Jr
DB	34	Emmonte Davis	Fr
DB	35	Tobias Weaver	Fr
DB	36	Braiden Clopton	Fr
DB	38	Trey Smith	Jr
DB	40	Carson Horner	Fr
DB	41	Kobe Sterling	Fr
LB	42	Jaylen Phillips	Fr
LB	43	Trey Fields	Fr
DE	44	Juan Henry	So
DB	45	Daniel North	Fr
DB	46	Jalan Mayes	So
DB	47	Brady Brewer	Fr
LB	48	Goodness Nwawuihe	Fr
LB	50	Ysidro Mascorro	Fr
LB	51	Trey Mappe	Fr
LB	54	Nick Abengowe	Fr
DL	55	Jahari Kay	Sr
DE	58	L. J. Salazar	So
DL	63	Roscoe Jones	So
DL	90	Trace Mascorro	Sr
DT	92	Scean Mustin	Sr
DL	93	Richard Outland Jr.	Fr
DL	94	Jevon Leon	So
DL	95	Joseph Wallace	Sr
DL	96	Zach Loane	Jr
DL	97	Chris Scott	So
DE	98	Briceon Hayes	Fr

Special teams

Pos.	#	Name	Class
P	37	Cameron Hearn	Sr
K	39	Reed Honshtein	Fr
LS	41	Noah Caldwell	Jr
P	47	Matt McRobert	Sr
LS	53	Tanner Boston	So
K	87	Seth Morgan	Fr

Head coach

- K. C. Keeler

Coordinators/assistant coaches

- Clayton Carlin – Defensive coordinator/safeties
- Ryan Carty – Offensive coordinator/quarterbacks
- Terence Archer – Passing game coordinator/wide receivers
- Gary McGraw – Cornerbacks/special teams coordinator/defensive pass game coordinator/defensive recruiting coordinator
- Chris Buckner – Running backs/offensive recruiting coordinator
- Chris Rogers – Offensive line
- Siddiq Haynes – Defensive line/defensive tackles
- Joe Morris – Defensive ends
- Jared Hensley – Linebackers
- Matt Merkens – Tight ends
- Clayton Barnes – Director of football operations & player personnel
- Ragan Henderson – Athletic equipment coordinator/assistant director of football operations
- Zach Milliet – Special teams analyst
- Mike Singletary – Video coordinator
- Garrett Smith – Offensive quality control
- Michael Crow – Defensive quality control
- Christian Borak – Football operations assistant

Legend

- (C) Team captain
- (S) Suspended
- (I) Ineligible
- Injured
- Redshirt

Roster
Last update: July 16, 2021

== Schedule ==
Sam Houston State had games scheduled against Mississippi Valley State and Tarleton State, but were canceled due to the COVID-19 pandemic.

In the delayed 2020 season, played in early 2021, the Bearkats went 6–0 in regular season games. The team then won four games in the FCS Playoffs to complete an undefeated 10–0 season, including a 23–21 victory over South Dakota State in the FCS Championship Game, securing the Bearkats their first FCS title.

Date	Time	Opponent	Rank	Site	TV	Result	Attendance
February 27, 2021	6:00 p.m.	No. 18 Southeastern Louisiana	No. 17	Bowers Stadium; Huntsville, TX	ESPN+	W 43–38	2,612
March 13, 2021	12:00 p.m.	No. 7 Nicholls	No. 12	Bowers Stadium; Huntsville, TX	ESPN+	W 71–17	2,103
March 20, 2021	6:00 p.m.	at Lamar	No. 7	Provost Umphrey Stadium; Beaumont, TX	ESPN+	W 62–7	2,845
April 1, 2021	6:00 p.m.	at Northwestern State	No. 5	Harry Turpin Stadium; Natchitoches, LA	ESPN+	W 24–16	1,221
April 10, 2021	4:00 p.m.	McNeese State	No. 5	Bowers Stadium; Huntsville, TX	ESPN+	W 27–13	3,103
April 17, 2021	11:00 a.m.	at No. 25 Incarnate Word	No. 5	Gayle and Tom Benson Stadium; San Antonio, TX	ESPN+	W 42–14	743
April 24, 2021	11:00 a.m.	No. 10 Monmouth*	No. 4	Bowers Stadium; Huntsville, TX (NCAA Division I First Round)	ESPN3	W 21–15	2,078
May 2, 2021	2:00 p.m.	No. 6 North Dakota State*	No. 4	Bowers Stadium; Huntsville, TX (NCAA Division I Quarterfinal)	ESPN	W 24–20	4,984
May 8, 2021	1:30 p.m.	No. 1 James Madison*	No. 4	Bowers Stadium; Huntsville, TX (NCAA Division I Semifinal)	ABC	W 38–35	5,038
May 16, 2021	1:00 p.m.	vs. No. 2 South Dakota State*	No. 4	Toyota Stadium; Frisco, TX (NCAA Division I Championship Game)	ABC	W 23–21	7,840
*Non-conference game; Rankings from STATS Poll released prior to the game; All times are in Central time

== Rankings ==
Ranking movements Legend: ██ Increase in ranking ██ Decrease in ranking ( ) = First-place votes
	Week										
Poll	Pre	1	2	3	4	5	6	7	8	9	Final
STATS	22	17	12	12	7	5 (1)	5	5 (1)	5 (2)	4 (3)	1 (40)
Coaches					6	4	5	5	5	4	1 (23)

== Game summaries ==
=== No. 18 Southeastern Louisiana ===
No. 18 Southeastern Louisiana Lions at No. 17 Sam Houston State Bearkats – Game summary

Quarter	1	2	3	4	Total
No. 18 Lions	7	10	14	7	38
No. 17 Bearkats	10	10	14	9	43

at Bowers Stadium, Huntsville, Texas

- Date: February 27, 2021
- Game time: 6:00 p.m. CST
- Game weather: 75 °F (24 °C) • Weather: Overcast and muggy • Wind: 9 S MPH
- Game attendance: 2,612
- Referee: Vidal Jones
- TV: ESPN+
- Box score, Recap

Game information
First quarter
- SHSU – Ramon Jefferson 59-yard run (Seth Morgan kick), 9:47. Bearkats 7–0. Drive: 9 plays, 89 yards, 3:51.
- SELA – Austin Mitchell 1-yard pass from Cole Kelly (Mateo Rengifo kick), 6:08. Tied 7–7. Drive: 8 plays, 74 yards, 3:32.
- SHSU – Seth Morgan 39-yard field goal, 3:01. Bearkats 10–7. Drive: 9 plays, 54 yards, 3:07.

Second quarter

- SELA – Taron Jones 4-yard run (Mateo Rengifo kick), 14:33. Lions 14–10. Drive: 10 plays, 72 yards, 3:24.
- SHSU – Noah Smith 4-yard run (Seth Morgan kick), 12:21. Bearkats 17–14. Drive: 5 plays, 80 yards, 2:07.
- SELA – Mateo Rengifo 36-yard field goal, 6:16. Tied 17–17. Drive: 16 plays, 56 yards, 6:05.
- SHSU – Seth Morgan 21-yard field goal, 0:00. Bearkats 20–17. Drive: 8 plays, 64 yards, 1:26.

Third quarter

- SHSU – Ife Adeyi 6-yard run (Seth Morgan kick), 12:43. Bearkats 27–17. Drive: 3 plays, 12 yards, 0:37.
- SELA – Tim Wilson Jr. 4-yard pass from Cole Kelley (Mateo Rengifo kick), 5:01. Bearkats 27–24. Drive: 8 plays, 93 yards, 2:58.
- SHSU – Ife Adeyi 78-yard pass from Eric Schmid (Seth Morgan kick), 4:15. Bearkats 34–24. Drive: 2 plays, 81 yards, 0:41.
- SELA – C. J. Turner 11-yard pass from Cole Kelley (Mateo Rengifo kick), 0:34. Bearkats 34–31. Drive: 8 plays, 75 yards, 3:41.

Fourth quarter

- SHSU – Jequez Ezzard 30-yard pass from Eric Schmid (kick failed), 14:05. Bearkats 40–31. Drive: 4 plays, 81 yards, 1:23.
- SELA – C. J. Turner 10-yard pass from Cole Kelley (Mateo Rengifo kick), 8:21. Bearkats 40–38. Drive: 6 plays, 59 yards, 2:35.
- SHSU – Seth Morgan 24-yard field goal, 5:07. Bearkats 43–38. Drive: 8 plays, 68 yards, 3:14.

Statistics	SELA	SHSU
First downs	27	26
Total yards	536	672
Rushing yards	74	244
Passing yards	462	428
Turnovers	1	1
Time of possession	33:02	26:58

Team	Category	Player	Statistics
Southeastern Louisiana	Passing	Cole Kelley	36/53, 462 yards, 4 TD
Southeastern Louisiana	Rushing	Morgan Ellison	12 carries, 29 yards
Southeastern Louisiana	Receiving	C. J. Turner	11 receptions, 150 yards, 2 TD
Sam Houston State	Passing	Eric Schmid	25/40, 428 yards, 2 TD
Sam Houston State	Rushing	Ramon Jefferson	12 carries, 139 yards, TD
Sam Houston State	Receiving	Chandler Harvin	7 receptions, 118 yards

=== No. 7 Nicholls ===
No. 7 Nicholls Colonels at No. 12 Sam Houston State Bearkats – Game summary

Quarter	1	2	3	4	Total
No. 7 Colonels	7	3	7	0	17
No. 12 Bearkats	7	23	20	21	71

at Bowers Stadium, Huntsville, Texas

- Date: March 13, 2021
- Game time: 12:00 p.m. CST
- Game weather: Overcast and humid • Temperature: 75 °F (24 °C) • Wind: S 10 mph (16 km/h)
- Game attendance: 2,103
- Referee: Christopher Watson
- TV: ESPN+
- Box score, Recap

Game information
First quarter
- NICH – Dai'Jean Dixon 14-yard pass from Lindsey Scott Jr. (Gavin Lasseigne kick), 11:36. Colonels 7–0. Drive: 2 plays, 21 yards, 0:40.
- SHSU – Jequez Ezzard 14-yard pass from Eric Schmid (Seth Morgan kick), 1:26. Tied 7–7. Drive: 7 plays, 70 yards, 3:01.

Second quarter

- SHSU – Seth Morgan 24-yard field goal, 12:32. Bearkats 10–7. Drive: 5 plays, 74 yards, 2:28.
- SHSU – Noah Smith 29-yard pass from Eric Schmid (Seth Morgan kick), 8:53. Bearkats 17–7. Drive: 6 plays, 80 yards, 2:14.
- SHSU – Jahari Kay 24-yard interception return (Seth Morgan kick), 8:44. Bearkats 24–7.
- SHSU – Jequez Ezzard 55-yard pass from Eric Schmid (pass failed), 2:34. Bearkats 30–7. Drive: 5 plays, 80 yards, 2:02.
- NICH – Gavin Lasseigne 29-yard field goal, 0:00. Bearkats 30–10. Drive: 7 plays, 55 yards, 0:36.

Third quarter

- SHSU – Dewaylon Ingram 5-yard pass from Eric Schmid (kick failed), 11:37. Bearkats 36–10. Drive: 9 plays, 75 yards, 3:26.
- SHSU – Noah Smith 6-yard pass from Eric Schmid (Seth Morgan kick), 10:50. Bearkats 43–10. Drive: 4 plays, 18 yards, 0:44.
- SHSU – Trevor Williams 79-yard fumble return (Seth Morgan kick), 7:00. Bearkats 50–10.
- NICH – Dai'Jean Mixon 5-yard run (Gavin Lasseigne kick), 0:03. Bearkats 50–17. Drive: 6 plays, 32 yards, 2:13.

Fourth quarter

- SHSU – Dee Bowens 10-yard pass from Eric Schmid (Seth Morgan kick), 11:23. Bearkats 57–17. Drive: 7 plays, 75 yards, 3:40.
- SHSU – Kyran Jackson 2-yard run (Seth Morgan kick), 8:22. Bearkats 64–17. Drive: 6 plays, 24 yards, 2:51.
- SHSU – Mike Dare 4-yard run (Seth Morgan kick), 0:48. Bearkats 71–17. Drive: 7 plays, 67 yards, 4:12.

Statistics	NICH	SHSU
First downs	19	23
Total yards	337	556
Rushing yards	118	190
Passing yards	219	366
Turnovers	4	2
Time of possession	28:54	31:06

Team	Category	Player	Statistics
Nicholls	Passing	Lindsey Scott Jr.	14/35, 186 yards, TD, INT
Nicholls	Rushing	Dontaze Costly	3 carries, 41 yards
Nicholls	Receiving	Dai'Jean Dixon	5 receptions, 83 yards, TD
Sam Houston State	Passing	Eric Schmid	21/32, 366 yards, 6 TD, 2 INT
Sam Houston State	Rushing	Daryon Triche	5 carries, 60 yards
Sam Houston State	Receiving	Jequez Ezzard	3 receptions, 139 yards, 2 TD

=== At Lamar ===
No. 7 Sam Houston State Bearkats at Lamar Cardinals – Game summary

Quarter	1	2	3	4	Total
No. 7 Bearkats	7	31	17	7	62
Cardinals	0	0	0	7	7

at Provost Umphrey Stadium, Beaumont, Texas

- Date: March 20, 2021
- Game time: 6:00 p.m. CST
- Game weather: Partly cloudy and cool • Temperature: 65 °F (18 °C) • Wind: NE 8 mph (13 km/h)
- Game attendance: 2,845
- Referee: Scott Hardin
- TV: ESPN+
- Box score, Recap

Game information
First quarter
- SHSU – Eric Schmid 16-yard run (Seth Morgan kick), 10:34. Bearkats 7–0. Drive: 5 plays, 70 yards, 1:27.

Second quarter

- SHSU – Jequez Ezzard 35-yard pass from Eric Schmid (Seth Morgan kick), 14:52. Bearkats 14–0. Drive: 3 plays, 25 yards, 1:03.
- SHSU – Jequez Ezzard 80-yard punt return (Seth Morgan kick), 13:43. Bearkats 21–0.
- SHSU – Eric Schmid 9-yard run (Seth Morgan kick), 10:20. Bearkats 28–0. Drive: 3 plays, 58 yards, 0:58.
- SHSU – Jequez Ezzard 41-yard pass from Eric Schmid (Seth Morgan kick), 4:10. Bearkats 35–0. Drive: 4 plays, 81 yards, 1:15.
- SHSU – Seth Morgan 36-yard field goal, 0:00. Bearkats 38–0. Drive: 7 plays, 56 yards, 1:14.

Third quarter

- SHSU – Eric Schmid 10-yard run (Seth Morgan kick), 12:16. Bearkats 45–0. Drive: 8 plays, 75 yards, 2:44.
- SHSU – Eric Schmid 5-yard run (Seth Morgan kick), 6:06. Bearkats 52–0. Drive: 8 plays, 69 yards, 3:27.
- SHSU – Seth Morgan 44-yard field goal, 1:12. Bearkats 55–0. Drive: 7 plays, 12 yards, 2:52.

Fourth quarter

- LAM – Jaylon Jackson 42-yard pass from Austin Scott (Bailey Giffen kick), 13:33. Bearkats 55–7. Drive: 5 plays, 79 yards, 2:34.
- SHSU – Donovan Williams 29-yard run (Seth Morgan kick), 4:59. Bearkats 62–7. Drive: 6 plays, 82 yards, 3:00.

Statistics	SHSU	LAM
First downs	22	9
Total yards	531	181
Rushing yards	181	28
Passing yards	350	153
Turnovers	4	4
Time of possession	27:57	32:03

Team	Category	Player	Statistics
Sam Houston State	Passing	Eric Schmid	19/29, 343 yards, 2 TD, INT
Sam Houston State	Rushing	Donovan Williams	7 carries, 47 yards, TD
Sam Houston State	Receiving	Jequez Ezzard	4 receptions, 130 yards, 2 TD
Lamar	Passing	Austin Scott	10/19, 123 yards, TD, 2 INT
Lamar	Rushing	Jaylon Jackson	6 carries, 40 yards
Lamar	Receiving	Jaylon Jackson	3 receptions, 66 yards, TD

=== At Northwestern State ===
No. 5 Sam Houston State Bearkats at Northwestern State Demons – Game summary

Quarter	1	2	3	4	Total
No. 5 Bearkats	7	7	7	3	24
Demons	0	3	0	13	16

at Harry Turpin Stadium, Natchitoches, Louisiana

- Date: April 1, 2021
- Game time: 6:00 p.m. CST
- Game weather: Sunny and clear • Temperature: 65 °F (18 °C) • Wind: SW 11 mph (18 km/h)
- Game attendance: 1,221
- Referee: Ed Bourgeois
- TV: ESPN+
- Box score, Recap

Game information
First quarter
- SHSU – Cody Chrest 28-yard pass from Eric Schmid (Seth Morgan kick), 11:43. Bearkats 7–0. Drive: 6 plays, 51 yards, 1:40.

Second quarter

- SHSU – Ife Adeyi 19-yard pass from Eric Schmid (Seth Morgan kick), 2:19. Bearkats 14–0. Drive: 8 plays, 76 yards, 3:14.
- NWST – Eddie Godina 35-yard field goal, 0:00. Bearkats 14–3. Drive: 12 plays, 62 yards, 2:12.

Third quarter

- SHSU – Donovan Williams 6-yard run (Seth Morgan kick), 5:55. Bearkats 21–3. Drive: 7 plays, 70 yards, 2:12.

Fourth quarter

- NWST – Marquise Bridges 20-yard pass from Bryce Rivers (kick blocked), 13:44. Bearkats 21–9. Drive: 1 play, 20 yards, 0:06.
- SHSU – Seth Morgan 41-yard field goal, 10:13. Bearkats 24–9. Drive: 8 plays, 50 yards, 3:30.
- NWST – Javon Antonio 7-yard pass from Bryce Rivers (Eddie Godina kick), 0:21. Bearkats 24–16. Drive: 12 plays, 85 yards, 2:12.

Statistics	SHSU	NWST
First downs	23	24
Total yards	445	453
Rushing yards	133	43
Passing yards	312	410
Turnovers	2	3
Time of possession	32:30	27:30

Team	Category	Player	Statistics
Sam Houston State	Passing	Eric Schmid	22/41, 312 yards, 2 TD, 2 INT
Sam Houston State	Rushing	Ramon Jefferson	18 carries, 107 yards
Sam Houston State	Receiving	Ife Adeyi	6 receptions, 134 yards, TD
Northwestern State	Passing	Bryce Rivers	29/51, 410 yards, 2 TD
Northwestern State	Rushing	Scooter Adams	13 carries, 34 yards
Northwestern State	Receiving	Javon Antonio	10 receptions, 190 yards, TD

=== McNeese State ===
McNeese State Cowboys at No. 5 Sam Houston State Bearkats – Game summary

Quarter	1	2	3	4	Total
Cowboys	3	0	3	7	13
No. 5 Bearkats	7	10	10	0	27

at Bowers Stadium, Huntsville, Texas

- Date: April 10, 2021
- Game time: 4:00 p.m. CST
- Game weather: Clear and sunny • Temperature: 78 °F (26 °C) • Wind: N 9 mph (14 km/h)
- Game attendance: 3,103
- Referee: Dan Lewis
- TV: ESPN+
- Box score, Recap

Game information
First quarter
- MCN – Jacob Abel 19-yard field goal, 7:09. Cowboys 3–0. Drive: 12 plays, 79 yards, 5:31.
- SHSU – Noah Smith 19-yard pass from Eric Schmid (Seth Morgan kick), 2:53. Bearkats 7–3. Drive: 8 plays, 64 yards, 4:11.

Second quarter

- SHSU – Ramon Jefferson 1-yard run (Seth Morgan kick), 3:27. Bearkats 14–3. Drive: 7 plays, 47 yards, 3:28.
- SHSU – Seth Morgan 21-yard field goal, 0:00. Bearkats 17–3. Drive: 11 plays, 34 yards, 2:17.

Third quarter

- SHSU – Seth Morgan 33-yard field goal, 12:17. Bearkats 20–3. Drive: 6 plays, 49 yards, 2:37.
- SHSU – Donovan Williams 2-yard run (Seth Morgan kick), 7:43. Bearkats 27–3. Drive: 7 plays, 85 yards, 3:06.
- MCN – Jacob Abel 25-yard field goal, 4:58. Bearkats 27–6. Drive: 10 plays, 68 yards, 2:45.

Fourth quarter

- MCN – Joshua Matthews 24-yard pass from Cody Orgeron (Jacob Abel kick), 11:18. Bearkats 27–13. Drive: 4 plays, 45 yards, 1:23.

Statistics	MCN	SHSU
First downs	19	19
Total yards	328	392
Rushing yards	37	190
Passing yards	291	202
Turnovers	1	3
Time of possession	30:02	29:58

Team	Category	Player	Statistics
McNeese State	Passing	Cody Orgeron	27/42, 291 yards, TD
McNeese State	Rushing	Cody Orgeron	18 carries, 18 yards
McNeese State	Receiving	Joshua Matthews	6 receptions, 95 yards, TD
Sam Houston State	Passing	Eric Schmid	12/24, 202 yards, TD, 2 INT
Sam Houston State	Rushing	Eric Schmid	15 carries, 92 yards
Sam Houston State	Receiving	Jequez Ezzard	3 receptions, 87 yards

=== At No. 25 Incarnate Word ===
No. 5 Sam Houston State Bearkats at No. 25 Incarnate Word Cardinals – Game summary

Quarter	1	2	3	4	Total
No. 5 Bearkats	0	14	14	14	42
No. 25 Cardinals	0	7	7	0	14

at Gayle and Tom Benson Stadium, San Antonio, Texas

- Date: April 17, 2021
- Game time: 11:00 a.m. CST
- Game weather: Partly cloudy • Temperature: 65 °F (18 °C) • Wind: SSW 19 mph (31 km/h)
- Game attendance: 743
- Referee: Dan Lewis
- TV: ESPN+
- Box score, Recap

Game information
First quarter
- No scoring plays

Second quarter

- SHSU – Jequez Ezzard 21-yard run (Seth Morgan kick), 14:52. Bearkats 7–0. Drive: 12 plays, 90 yards, 5:21.
- SHSU – Ife Adeyi 4-yard run (Seth Morgan kick), 7:04. Bearkats 14–0. Drive: 10 plays, 91 yards, 4:11.
- UIW – Tre Wolf 1-yard pass from Cameron Ward (Carson Mohr kick), 0:22. Bearkats 14–7. Drive: 10 plays, 77 yards, 2:39.

Third quarter

- SHSU – Eric Schmid 11-yard run (Seth Morgan kick), 11:02. Bearkats 21–7. Drive: 7 plays, 75 yards, 3:58.
- UIW – Jayden Jones 8-yard pass from Cameron Ward (Carson Mohr kick), 7:34. Bearkats 21–14. Drive: 9 plays, 63 yards, 3:17.
- SHSU – Donovan Williams 4-yard run (Seth Morgan kick), 6:08. Bearkats 28–14. Drive: 4 plays, 75 yards, 1:26.

Fourth quarter

- SHSU – Ramon Jefferson 6-yard run (Seth Morgan kick), 8:32. Bearkats 35–14. Drive: 13 plays, 84 yards, 6:30.
- SHSU – Jequez Ezzard 36-yard pass from Eric Schmid (Seth Morgan kick), 3:24. Bearkats 42–14. Drive: 5 plays, 71 yards, 2:38.

Statistics	SHSU	UIW
First downs	29	21
Total yards	599	340
Rushing yards	229	35
Passing yards	370	305
Turnovers	1	1
Time of possession	32:52	27:08

Team	Category	Player	Statistics
Sam Houston State	Passing	Eric Schmid	25/34, 370 yards, TD
Sam Houston State	Rushing	Ramon Jefferson	13 carries, 92 yards, TD
Sam Houston State	Receiving	Jequez Ezzard	7 receptions, 155 yards, TD
Incarnate Word	Passing	Cam Ward	32/53, 305 yards, 2 TD
Incarnate Word	Rushing	Kevin Brown	9 carries, 64 yards
Incarnate Word	Receiving	Robert Ferrel	9 receptions, 98 yards

=== No. 10 Monmouth (FCS First Round) ===
No. 10 Monmouth Hawks at No. 4 Sam Houston State Bearkats (FCS First Round) – Game summary

Quarter	1	2	3	4	Total
No. 10 Hawks	0	0	0	15	15
No. 4 Bearkats	7	7	7	0	21

at Bowers Stadium, Huntsville, Texas

- Date: April 24, 2021
- Game time: 11:00 a.m. CST
- Game weather: Sunny, 73 °F (23 °C)
- Game attendance: 2,078
- Referee: Andrew Speciale
- TV: ESPN3
- Box score, Recap

Game information
First quarter
- SHSU – Cody Chrest 13-yard pass from Eric Schmid (Seth Morgan kick), 4:22. Bearkats 7–0. Drive: 8 plays, 47 yards, 3:52.

Second quarter

- SHSU – Ramon Jefferson 56-yard run (Seth Morgan kick), 2:52. Bearkats 14–0. Drive: 3 plays, 65 yards, 1:10.

Third quarter

- SHSU – Ramon Jefferson 3-yard run (Seth Morgan kick), 9:49. Bearkats 21–0. Drive: 5 plays, 85 yards, 2:35.

Fourth quarter

- MONM – Juwon Farri 1-yard run (Tony Muskett pass to Gene Scott), 13:09. Bearkats 21–8. Drive: 17 plays, 90 yards, 8:12.
- MONM – Terrance Green Jr. 30-yard pass from Tony Muskett (Kaeon Thomas kick), 5:58. Bearkats 21–15. Drive: 15 plays, 86 yards, 5:32.

Statistics	MONM	SHSU
First downs	27	9
Total yards	412	267
Rushing yards	115	134
Passing yards	297	133
Turnovers	2	0
Time of possession	39:41	20:19

Team	Category	Player	Statistics
Monmouth	Passing	Tony Muskett	29/46, 297 yards, TD, 2 INT
Monmouth	Rushing	Juwon Farri	25 carries, 98 yards, TD
Monmouth	Receiving	Terrance Greene Jr.	9 receptions, 94 yards, TD
Sam Houston State	Passing	Eric Schmid	12/24, 133 yards, TD
Sam Houston State	Rushing	Ramon Jefferson	9 carries, 95 yards, 2 TD
Sam Houston State	Receiving	Cody Chrest	8 receptions, 67 yards, TD

=== No. 6 North Dakota State (FCS Quarterfinals) ===
No. 6 North Dakota State Bisons at No. 4 Sam Houston State Bearkats (FCS Quarterfinals) – Game summary

Quarter	1	2	3	4	Total
No. 6 Bison	0	2	15	3	20
No. 4 Bearkats	10	0	7	7	24

at Bowers Stadium, Huntsville, Texas

- Date: May 2, 2021
- Game time: 2:00 p.m. CST
- Game weather: Partly cloudy, 82 °F (28 °C)
- Game attendance: 4,984
- Referee: Jeff Knight
- TV: ESPN
- Box score, Recap

Game information
First quarter
- SHSU – Seth Morgan 24-yard field goal, 7:55. Bearkats 3–0. Drive: 12 plays, 47 yards, 4:17.
- SHSU – Ramon Jefferson 1-yard run (Seth Morgan kick), 2:27. Bearkats 10–0. Drive: 7 plays, 38 yards, 2:10.

Second quarter

- NDSU – Matt McRobert punt blocked by Logan McCormick, 5:13. Bearkats 10–2.

Third quarter

- SHSU – Noah Smith 23-yard pass from Eric Schmid (Seth Morgan kick), 8:39. Bearkats 17–2. Drive: 12 plays, 75 yards, 6:21.
- NDSU – Christian Watson 94-yard kickoff return (Jake Reinholz kick), 8:27. Bearkats 17–9.
- NDSU – Braylon Henderson 76-yard punt return (Cam Miller pass to Christian Watson), 6:43. Tied 17–17.

Fourth quarter

- NDSU – Jake Reinholz 33-yard field goal, 8:17. Bison 20–17. Drive: 20 plays, 60 yards, 9:44.
- SHSU – Eric Schmid 6-yard run (Seth Morgan kick), 3:39. Bearkats 24–20. Drive: 9 plays, 72 yards, 4:38.

Statistics	NDSU	SHSU
First downs	13	16
Total yards	229	317
Rushing yards	139	90
Passing yards	90	227
Turnovers	3	0
Time of possession	30:03	29:57

Team	Category	Player	Statistics
North Dakota State	Passing	Cam Miller	7/18, 90 yards, 2 INT
North Dakota State	Rushing	Hunter Luepke	12 carries, 57 yards
North Dakota State	Receiving	Christian Watson	1 reception, 35 yards
Sam Houston State	Passing	Eric Schmid	25/37, 227 yards, TD
Sam Houston State	Rushing	Eric Schmid	10 carries, 36 yards, TD
Sam Houston State	Receiving	Noah Smith	10 receptions, 103 yards, TD

=== No. 1 James Madison (FCS Semifinals) ===
No. 1 James Madison Dukes at No. 4 Sam Houston State Bearkats (FCS Semifinals) – Game summary

Quarter	1	2	3	4	Total
No. 1 Dukes	0	24	3	8	35
No. 4 Bearkats	3	0	28	7	38

at Bowers Stadium, Huntsville, Texas

- Date: May 8, 2021
- Game time: 1:30 p.m. CST
- Game weather: Sunny and clear, 85 °F (29 °C)
- Game attendance: 5,038
- Referee: Drew Myers
- TV: ABC
- Box score, Recap

Game information
First quarter
- SHSU – Seth Morgan 29-yard field goal, 9:14. Bearkats 3–0. Drive: 7 plays, 26 yards, 2:13.

Second quarter

- JMU – Ethan Ratke 26-yard field goal, 10:26. Tied 3–3. Drive: 10 plays, 55 yards, 4:57.
- JMU – Cole Johnson 1-yard run (Ethan Ratke kick), 6:09. Dukes 10–3. Drive: 7 plays, 71 yards, 3:00.
- JMU – Antwane Wells Jr. 4-yard pass from Cole Johnson (Ethan Ratke kick), 1:26. Dukes 17–3. Drive: 6 plays, 89 yards, 1:47.
- JMU – Clayton Cheatham 7-yard pass from Cole Johnson (Ethan Ratke kick), 0:10. Dukes 24–3. Drive: 4 plays, 51 yards, 0:58.

Third quarter

- SHSU – Ramon Jefferson 7-yard run (Seth Morgan kick), 8:14. Dukes 24–10. Drive: 7 plays, 80 yards, 2:42.
- JMU – Ethan Ratke 48-yard field goal, 3:00. Dukes 27–10. Drive: 10 plays, 29 yards, 5:14.
- SHSU – Jequez Ezzard 69-yard pass from Eric Schmid (Seth Morgan kick), 2:22. Dukes 27–17. Drive: 2 plays, 75 yards, 0:38.
- SHSU – Jequez Ezzard 80-yard punt return (Seth Morgan kick), 0:42. Dukes 27–24.
- SHSU – Eric Schmid 20-yard run (Seth Morgan kick), 0:00. Bearkats 31–27. Drive: 3 plays, 32 yards, 0:42.

Fourth quarter

- SHSU – Eric Schmid 11-yard run (Seth Morgan kick), 12:16. Bearkats 38–27. Drive: 5 plays, 30 yards, 2:39.
- JMU – Scott Bracey 34-yard pass from Cole Johnson (Cole Johnson run), 10:14. Bearkats 38–35. Drive: 6 plays, 72 yards, 2:02.

Statistics	JMU	SHSU
First downs	23	18
Total yards	430	336
Rushing yards	159	118
Passing yards	271	218
Turnovers	2	2
Time of possession	35:54	24:06

Team	Category	Player	Statistics
James Madison	Passing	Cole Johnson	16/26, 271 yards, 3 TD, INT
James Madison	Rushing	Percy Agyei-Obese	24 carries, 98 yards
James Madison	Receiving	Antwane Wells Jr.	7 receptions, 89 yards, TD
Sam Houston State	Passing	Eric Schmid	13/27, 218 yards, TD, 2 INT
Sam Houston State	Rushing	Ramon Jefferson	15 carries, 60 yards, TD
Sam Houston State	Receiving	Jequez Ezzard	4 receptions, 107 yards, TD

=== Vs. No. 2 South Dakota State (FCS National Championship) ===
No. 4 Sam Houston State Bearkats vs. No. 2 South Dakota State Jackrabbits (FCS National Championship) – Game summary

Quarter	1	2	3	4	Total
No. 4 Bearkats	0	14	3	6	23
No. 2 Jackrabbits	7	0	0	14	21

at Toyota Stadium, Frisco, Texas

- Date: May 16, 2021
- Game time: 1:00 p.m. CST
- Game weather: Light rain, 68 °F (20 °C)
- Game attendance: 7,840
- Referee: Steve Cadorette
- TV announcers (ABC): Dave Pasch, Andre Ware, and Kris Budden
- Box score, Recap

Game information
First quarter
- SDSU – Isaiah Davis 1-yard run (Cole Frahm kick), 7:33. Jackrabbits 7–0. Drive: 5 plays, 41 yards, 2:16.

Second quarter

- SHSU – Jequez Ezzard 35-yard pass from Eric Schmid (Seth Morgan kick), 11:16. Tied 7–7. Drive: 3 plays, 56 yards, 1:16.
- SHSU – Jequel Ezzard 15-yard pass from Eric Schmid (Seth Morgan kick), 1:21. Bearkats 14–7. Drive: 9 plays, 74 yards, 3:32.

Third quarter

- SHSU – Seth Morgan 45-yard field goal, 0:37. Bearkats 17–7. Drive: 10 plays, 39 yards, 4:20.

Fourth quarter

- SDSU – Isaiah Davis 28-yard run (Cole Frahm kick), 13:12. Bearkats 17–14. Drive: 5 plays, 72 yards, 2:25.
- SDSU – Isaiah Davis 85-yard run (Cole Frahm kick), 5:41. Jackrabbits 21–17. Drive: 2 plays, 85 yards, 0:19.
- SHSU – Ife Adeyi 10-yard pass from Eric Schmid (kick failed), 0:16. Bearkats 23–21. Drive: 16 plays, 65 yards, 5:25.

Statistics	SHSU	SDST
First downs	19	17
Total yards	353	362
Rushing yards	144	239
Passing yards	209	123
Turnovers	1	1
Time of possession	31:09	28:51

Team	Category	Player	Statistics
Sam Houston State	Passing	Eric Schmid	20/37, 209 yards, 3 TD
Sam Houston State	Rushing	Ramon Jefferson	16 carries, 96 yards
Sam Houston State	Receiving	Jequez Ezzard	10 receptions, 108 yards, 2 TD
South Dakota State	Passing	Keaton Heide	11/22, 107 yards, INT
South Dakota State	Rushing	Isaiah Davis	14 carries, 178 yards, 3 TD
South Dakota State	Receiving	Zach Heins	3 receptions, 44 yards
