= 2020 South Dakota State Jackrabbits football team =

American college football season

2020 South Dakota State Jackrabbits football

MVFC co-champion

NCAA Division I Championship Game, L 21–23 vs. Sam Houston State
- Conference: Missouri Valley Football Conference

Ranking
- STATS: No. 2
- FCS Coaches: No. 2
- Record: 8–2 (5–1 MVFC)
- Head coach: John Stiegelmeier (24th season)
- Offensive coordinator: Jason Eck (2nd season)
- Co-defensive coordinators: Brian Bergstrom (2nd season); Jimmy Rogers (2nd season)
- Home stadium: Dana J. Dykhouse Stadium

2020 Missouri Valley Football Conference standings
	Conf.			Overall
Team	W		L	W		L
No. 2 South Dakota State +^	5	–	1	8	–	2
No. 12 Missouri State +^	5	–	1	5	–	5
No. 7 North Dakota ^	4	–	1	5	–	2
No. 6 North Dakota State ^	5	–	2	7	–	3
No. 14 Southern Illinois ^	3	–	3	6	–	4
Northern Iowa	3	–	4	3	–	4
South Dakota	1	–	3	1	–	3
Illinois State†	1	–	3	1	–	3
Western Illinois†	1	–	5	1	–	5
Youngstown State	1	–	6	1	–	6
+ – Conference co-champions; ^ – FCS playoff participant; Note: Indiana State opted out of the spring season. † – Illinois State and Western Illinois opted out of the remainder of the spring season on March 21 and April 5, 2021, respectively.; Rankings from STATS Poll

The 2020 South Dakota State Jackrabbits football team represented South Dakota State University as a member of the Missouri Valley Football Conference (MVFC) during the 2020–21 NCAA Division I FCS football season. Led by 24th-year head coach John Stiegelmeier, the Jackrabbits compiled an overall record of 8–2 with a mark of 5–1 in conference play, sharing the MVFC title with Missouri State. South Dakota State received the MVFC's automatic bid to the NCAA Division I Football Championship playoffs, where the Jackrabbits defeated Holy Cross in the first round, fellow MVFC member Southern Illinois in the quarterfinals, and Delaware in the semifinals before losing to Sam Houston State in the NCAA Division I Championship Game. The team played home games on campus at Dana J. Dykhouse Stadium in Brookings, South Dakota.

== Schedule ==
South Dakota State had games scheduled against Butler, Nebraska, and Tarleton State, which were later canceled before the start of the 2020 season.

Date	Time	Opponent	Rank	Site	TV	Result	Attendance
February 19	7:00 p.m.	at No. 3 Northern Iowa	No. 5	UNI-Dome; Cedar Falls, IA	ESPN+	W 24–20	2,137
February 27	12:00 p.m.	at No. 14 North Dakota	No. 3	Alerus Center; Grand Forks, ND	ESPN+	L 17–28	3,638
March 6	2:00 p.m.	Western Illinois	No. 8	Dana J. Dykhouse Stadium; Brookings, SD	ESPN+	W 45–10	2,347
March 13	2:00 p.m.	Youngstown State	No. 8	Dana J. Dykhouse Stadium; Brookings, SD	ESPN+	W 19–17	2,653
March 20	12:00 p.m.	at No. 5 Southern Illinois	No. 6	Saluki Stadium; Carbondale, IL	ESPN+	W 44–3	2,400
March 27	2:00 p.m.	Illinois State	No. 4	Dana J. Dykhouse Stadium; Brookings, SD	ESPN+	Canceled (Note: On March 21, 2021, Illinois State announced that it would opt-out of the remainder of the 2021 spring season due to safety concerns related to the COVID-19 pandemic.)	
April 10	2:00 p.m.	South Dakota	No. 4	Dana J. Dykhouse Stadium; Brookings, SD (rivalry)	ESPN+	Canceled	
April 17	2:30 p.m.	at No. 2 North Dakota State	No. 4	Fargodome; Fargo, ND (Dakota Marker)	ESPN+	W 27–17	8,762
April 24	3:00 p.m.	Holy Cross	No. 2	Dana J. Dykhouse Stadium; Brookings, SD (NCAA Division I First Round)	ESPN3	W 31–3	2,996
May 2	8:00 p.m.	No. 14 Southern Illinois	No. 2	Dana J. Dykhouse Stadium; Brookings, SD (NCAA Division I Quarterfinal)	ESPN2	W 31–26	2,998
May 8	11:00 a.m.	No. 5 Delaware	No. 2	Dana J. Dykhouse Stadium; Brookings, SD (NCAA Division I Semifinal)	ESPN	W 33–3	3,547
May 16	1:00 p.m.	No. 4 Sam Houston State	No. 2	Toyota Stadium; Frisco, TX (NCAA Division I National Championship Game)	ABC	L 21–23	7,840
Rankings from STATS Poll released prior to the game; All times are in Central time
