= 2020 Western Illinois Leathernecks football team =

American college football season

2020 Western Illinois Leathernecks football
- Conference: Missouri Valley Football Conference
- Record: 1–5 (1–5 MVFC)
- Head coach: Jared Elliott (3rd season)
- Offensive coordinator: David Rocco (3rd season)
- Defensive coordinator: Cam Clark (1st season)
- Home stadium: Hanson Field

2020 Missouri Valley Football Conference standings
	Conf.			Overall
Team	W		L	W		L
No. 2 South Dakota State +^	5	–	1	8	–	2
No. 12 Missouri State +^	5	–	1	5	–	5
No. 7 North Dakota ^	4	–	1	5	–	2
No. 6 North Dakota State ^	5	–	2	7	–	3
No. 14 Southern Illinois ^	3	–	3	6	–	4
Northern Iowa	3	–	4	3	–	4
South Dakota	1	–	3	1	–	3
Illinois State†	1	–	3	1	–	3
Western Illinois†	1	–	5	1	–	5
Youngstown State	1	–	6	1	–	6
+ – Conference co-champions; ^ – FCS playoff participant; Note: Indiana State opted out of the spring season. † – Illinois State and Western Illinois opted out of the remainder of the spring season on March 21 and April 5, 2021, respectively.; Rankings from STATS Poll

The 2020 Western Illinois Leathernecks football team represented Western Illinois University as member of the Missouri Valley Football Conference (MVFC) during the 2020–21 NCAA Division I FCS football season. Led by third-year head coach Jared Elliott, the Leathernecks compiled an overall record of 1–5 with an identical mark in conference play, placing ninth in the MVFC. Western Illinois played home games at Hanson Field in Macomb, Illinois.

On April 5, 2021, Western Illinois announced that it was opting out of the remainder of the 2021 spring season due to a lack of available players.

== Schedule ==
Western Illinois's games scheduled against Southern Illinois on April 10 and South Dakota on April 17 were canceled when the Leathernecks opted out of the remainder of the season.

Date	Time	Opponent	Site	TV	Result	Attendance
February 27	1:00 p.m.	Missouri State	Hanson Field; Macomb, IL	ESPN+	L 24–30	421
March 6	3:00 p.m.	at No. 8 South Dakota State	Dana J. Dykhouse Stadium; Brookings, SD	ESPN+	L 10–45	2,347
March 13	1:00 p.m.	No. 3 North Dakota	Hanson Field; Macomb, IL	ESPN+	L 21–38	658
March 20	1:00 p.m.	at Illinois State	Hancock Stadium; Normal, IL	ESPN+	L 18–26	1,853
March 27	8:00 p.m.	No. 22 Northern Iowa	Hanson Field; Macomb, IL	ESPN+	L 20–34	542
April 3	8:00 p.m.	Youngstown State	Hanson Field; Macomb, IL	ESPN+	W 27–24	679
Rankings from STATS Poll released prior to the game; All times are in Eastern time
