= 2020 Southern Illinois Salukis football team =

American college football season

2020 Southern Illinois Salukis football

NCAA Division I Quarterfinal, L 26–31 vs. South Dakota State
- Conference: Missouri Valley Football Conference

Ranking
- STATS: No. 14
- FCS Coaches: No. 14
- Record: 6–4 (3–3 MVFC)
- Head coach: Nick Hill (5th season)
- Offensive coordinator: Blake Rolan (2nd season)
- Defensive coordinator: Jason Petrino (2nd season)
- Home stadium: Saluki Stadium

2020 Missouri Valley Football Conference standings
	Conf.			Overall
Team	W		L	W		L
No. 2 South Dakota State +^	5	–	1	8	–	2
No. 12 Missouri State +^	5	–	1	5	–	5
No. 7 North Dakota ^	4	–	1	5	–	2
No. 6 North Dakota State ^	5	–	2	7	–	3
No. 14 Southern Illinois ^	3	–	3	6	–	4
Northern Iowa	3	–	4	3	–	4
South Dakota	1	–	3	1	–	3
Illinois State†	1	–	3	1	–	3
Western Illinois†	1	–	5	1	–	5
Youngstown State	1	–	6	1	–	6
+ – Conference co-champions; ^ – FCS playoff participant; Note: Indiana State opted out of the spring season. † – Illinois State and Western Illinois opted out of the remainder of the spring season on March 21 and April 5, 2021, respectively.; Rankings from STATS Poll

The 2020 Southern Illinois Salukis football team represented Southern Illinois University Carbondale as a member of the Missouri Valley Football Conference (MVFC) during the 2020–21 NCAA Division I FCS football season. Led by fifth-year head coach Nick Hill, the Salukis compiled an overall record of 6–4 with a mark of 3–3 in conference play, placing fifth in the MVFC. Southern Illinois received an at-large berth in the NCAA Division I Football Championship playoffs, where they beat Weber State in the first round before losing to the eventual national runner-up, South Dakota State in the quarterfinals. The team played home games at Saluki Stadium in Carbondale, Illinois.

== Schedule ==
Southern Illinois had a game scheduled against Wisconsin on September 12, which was later canceled before the start of the 2020 season. An August 29 matchup with Kansas was announced on July 25.

Date	Time	Opponent	Rank	Site	TV	Result	Attendance
October 30	6:00 p.m.	vs. No. 24 Southeast Missouri State*	No. 24	Saluki Stadium; Carbondale, IL	KFVS-TV	W 20–17	0
February 20	12:00 p.m.	at North Dakota	No. 24	Alerus Center; Grand Forks, ND	ESPN+	L 21–44	3,176
February 27	12:00 p.m.	No. 1 North Dakota State		Saluki Stadium; Carbondale, IL	ESPN+	W 38–14	2,400
March 6	11:00 a.m.	at Youngstown State	No. 11	Stambaugh Stadium; Youngstown, OH	ESPN+	W 30–22	1,901
March 13	12:00 p.m.	No. 4 Northern Iowa	No. 10	Saluki Stadium; Carbondale, IL	ESPN+	W 17–16	2,400
March 20	12:00 p.m.	No. 6 South Dakota State	No. 5	Saluki Stadium; Carbondale, IL	ESPN+	L 3–44	2,400
March 27	2:00 p.m.	at Missouri State	No. 10	Robert W. Plaster Stadium; Springfield, MO	ESPN+	L 27–30	3,581
April 3	12:00 p.m.	at Illinois State	No. 18	Hancock Stadium; Normal, IL	ESPN+	Canceled (Note: On March 21, 2021, Illinois State announced that it would opt-out of the remainder of the 2021 spring season due to safety concerns related to the COVID-19 pandemic.)	
April 10	12:00 p.m.	Western Illinois	No. 16	Saluki Stadium; Carbondale, IL	ESPN+	Canceled (Note: On April 5, 2021, Western Illinois announced that it was opting out of the remainder of the 2021 spring season due to a lack of available players.)	
April 17	12:00 p.m.	No. 17 Southeastern Louisiana*	No. 18	Saluki Stadium; Carbondale, IL	ESPN+	W 55–48	2,400
April 24	3:00 p.m.	at No. 3 Weber State*	No. 14	Stewart Stadium; Ogden, UT (NCAA Division I First Round)	ESPN3	W 34–31	
May 2	8:00 p.m.	at No. 2 South Dakota State	No. 14	Dana J. Dykhouse Stadium; Brookings, SD (NCAA Division I Quarterfinal)	ESPN2	L 26–31	
*Non-conference game; Rankings from STATS Poll released prior to the game; All times are in Central time
