= 2020 Youngstown State Penguins football team =

American college football season

2020 Youngstown State Penguins football
- Conference: Missouri Valley Football Conference
- Record: 1–6 (1–6 MVFC)
- Head coach: Doug Phillips (1st season)
- Offensive coordinator: Troy Rothenbuhler (1st season)
- Offensive scheme: Multiple
- Defensive coordinator: Joe Schaefer (1st season)
- Base defense: 4–2–5
- Home stadium: Stambaugh Stadium

2020 Missouri Valley Football Conference standings
	Conf.			Overall
Team	W		L	W		L
No. 2 South Dakota State +^	5	–	1	8	–	2
No. 12 Missouri State +^	5	–	1	5	–	5
No. 7 North Dakota ^	4	–	1	5	–	2
No. 6 North Dakota State ^	5	–	2	7	–	3
No. 14 Southern Illinois ^	3	–	3	6	–	4
Northern Iowa	3	–	4	3	–	4
South Dakota	1	–	3	1	–	3
Illinois State†	1	–	3	1	–	3
Western Illinois†	1	–	5	1	–	5
Youngstown State	1	–	6	1	–	6
+ – Conference co-champions; ^ – FCS playoff participant; Note: Indiana State opted out of the spring season. † – Illinois State and Western Illinois opted out of the remainder of the spring season on March 21 and April 5, 2021, respectively.; Rankings from STATS Poll

The 2020 Youngstown State Penguins football team represented Youngstown State University as a member of the Missouri Valley Football Conference during the 2020–21 NCAA Division I FCS football season. They were led by first-year head coach Doug Phillips and played their home games at Stambaugh Stadium.

== Schedule ==
Date	Time	Opponent	Site	TV	Result	Attendance
February 21	3:30 p.m.	at No. 1 North Dakota State	Fargodome; Fargo, ND	NBC ND/ESPN+	L 7–25	6,578
February 27	12:00 p.m.	No. 5 Northern Iowa	Stambaugh Stadium; Youngstown, OH	ESPN+	L 0–21	2,128
March 6	12:00 p.m.	No. 11 Southern Illinois	Stambaugh Stadium; Youngstown, OH	ESPN+	L 22–30	1,901
March 13	3:00 p.m.	at No. 8 South Dakota State	Dana J. Dykhouse Stadium; Brookings, SD	ESPN+	L 17–19	2,653
March 20	12:00 p.m.	South Dakota^{†}	Stambaugh Stadium; Youngstown, OH	ESPN+	W 28–10	2,159
April 3	8:00 p.m.	at Western Illinois	Hanson Field; Macomb, IL	ESPN+	L 24–27	679
April 10	3:00 p.m.	at No. 15 Missouri State	Robert W. Plaster Stadium; Springfield, MO	ESPN+	L 10–21	2,948
April 17		No. 6 North Dakota	Stambaugh Stadium; Youngstown, OH	ESPN+	Cancelled	
^{†}Homecoming; Rankings from STATS Poll released prior to the game; All times are in Eastern time
