= 2020 Illinois State Redbirds football team =

American college football season

2020 Illinois State Redbirds football
- Conference: Missouri Valley Football Conference

Ranking
- STATS: No. 22
- Record: 1–3 (1–3 MVFC)
- Head coach: Brock Spack (12th season)
- Co-offensive coordinators: C. J. Irvin (1st season); Ghaali Muhammad-Lankford (1st season)
- Defensive coordinator: Travis Niekamp (3rd season)
- Captains: Drew Himmelman; Zeke Vandenburgh; ZJT Bohlken
- Home stadium: Hancock Stadium

2020 Missouri Valley Football Conference standings
	Conf.			Overall
Team	W		L	W		L
No. 2 South Dakota State +^	5	–	1	8	–	2
No. 12 Missouri State +^	5	–	1	5	–	5
No. 7 North Dakota ^	4	–	1	5	–	2
No. 6 North Dakota State ^	5	–	2	7	–	3
No. 14 Southern Illinois ^	3	–	3	6	–	4
Northern Iowa	3	–	4	3	–	4
South Dakota	1	–	3	1	–	3
Illinois State†	1	–	3	1	–	3
Western Illinois†	1	–	5	1	–	5
Youngstown State	1	–	6	1	–	6
+ – Conference co-champions; ^ – FCS playoff participant; Note: Indiana State opted out of the spring season. † – Illinois State and Western Illinois opted out of the remainder of the spring season on March 21 and April 5, 2021, respectively.; Rankings from STATS Poll

The 2020 Illinois State Redbirds football team represented Illinois State University as a member of the Missouri Valley Football Conference (MVFC) during the 2020–21 NCAA Division I FCS football season. Led by 12th-year head coach Brock Spack, the Redbirds compiled an overall record of 1–3 with an identical in conference play, tying for seventh place in the MVFC. Illinois State played home games at Hancock Stadium in Normal, Illinois.

On March 21, 2021, Illinois State announced that it would opt out of the remainder of the 2021 spring season due to safety concerns related to the COVID-19 pandemic.

== Schedule ==
Illinois State released their full schedule on July 15, 2019.

The Redbirds football team had non-conference games scheduled at Illinois on September 4, versus Eastern Illinois on September 12, and versus Dixie State on November 21. All were canceled prior to the scheduled start of the 2020 season.

On January 21, 2021, the Missouri Valley Football Conference office released an altered spring season schedule based on the participation of ten league schools.

Scheduled games against South Dakota State (March 27), Southern Illinois (April 3), North Dakota (April 10), and Missouri State (April 17) were canceled when the Redbirds opted out of the remainder of the spring season.

Date	Time	Opponent	Rank	Site	TV	Result	Attendance
February 27	12:00 p.m.	South Dakota	No. 7	Hancock Stadium; Normal, IL	NBCSCH/ESPN+	L 20–27	1,853
March 6	4:00 p.m.	at No. 3 Northern Iowa	No. 15	UNI-Dome; Cedar Falls, IA	ESPN+	L 10–20	1,920
March 13	2:30 p.m.	at No. 5 North Dakota State	No. 22	Fargodome; Fargo, ND	NBC ND/ESPN+	L 13–21	6,145
March 20	12:00 p.m.	Western Illinois		Hancock Stadium; Normal, IL	ESPN+	W 26–18	1,853
Rankings from STATS Poll released prior to the game; All times are in Central time
