= 2020 South Dakota Coyotes football team =

American college football season

2020 South Dakota Coyotes football
- Conference: Missouri Valley Football Conference
- Record: 1–3 (1–3 MVFC)
- Head coach: Bob Nielson (5th season)
- Offensive coordinator: Ted Schlafke (3rd season)
- Offensive scheme: Pro-style
- Defensive coordinator: Travis Johansen (2nd season)
- Base defense: Multiple
- Home stadium: DakotaDome

2020 Missouri Valley Football Conference standings
	Conf.			Overall
Team	W		L	W		L
No. 2 South Dakota State +^	5	–	1	8	–	2
No. 12 Missouri State +^	5	–	1	5	–	5
No. 7 North Dakota ^	4	–	1	5	–	2
No. 6 North Dakota State ^	5	–	2	7	–	3
No. 14 Southern Illinois ^	3	–	3	6	–	4
Northern Iowa	3	–	4	3	–	4
South Dakota	1	–	3	1	–	3
Illinois State†	1	–	3	1	–	3
Western Illinois†	1	–	5	1	–	5
Youngstown State	1	–	6	1	–	6
+ – Conference co-champions; ^ – FCS playoff participant; Note: Indiana State opted out of the spring season. † – Illinois State and Western Illinois opted out of the remainder of the spring season on March 21 and April 5, 2021, respectively.; Rankings from STATS Poll

The 2020 South Dakota Coyotes football team represented the University of South Dakota in the 2020–21 NCAA Division I FCS football season. They were led by fifth-year head coach Bob Nielson and played their home games in the DakotaDome. They played as a member of the Missouri Valley Football Conference.

== Schedule ==
Date	Time	Opponent	Rank	Site	TV	Result	Attendance
February 27	12:00 p.m.	at No. 7 Illinois State		Hancock Stadium; Normal, IL	ESPN+	W 27–20	1,853
March 4	5:00 p.m.	at No. 4 North Dakota	No. 20	Alerus Center; Grand Forks, ND (Sitting Bull Trophy)	ESPN+	L 10–21	3,491
March 13	1:00 p.m.	Missouri State	No. 21	DakotaDome; Vermillion, SD	ESPN+	L 24–27	2,051
March 20	11:00 a.m.	at Youngstown State		Stambaugh Stadium; Youngstown, OH	ESPN+	L 10–28	2,159
~~March 27~~	~~1:00 p.m.~~	~~No. 2 North Dakota State~~		~~DakotaDome~~; ~~Vermillion, SD~~	~~ESPN+~~	Canceled	
~~April 2~~	~~6:00 p.m.~~	~~No. 23 Northern Iowa~~		~~DakotaDome~~; ~~Vermillion, SD~~	~~ESPN+~~	Canceled	
~~April 10~~	~~2:00 p.m.~~	~~at South Dakota State~~		~~Dana J. Dykhouse Stadium~~; ~~Brookings, SD (rivalry)~~	~~ESPN+~~	Canceled	
~~April 17~~	~~6:00 p.m.~~	~~Western Illinois~~		~~DakotaDome~~; ~~Vermillion, SD~~	~~MVFC TV~~	Canceled (Note: On April 5, 2021, Western Illinois announced that it was opting out of the remainder of the 2021 spring season due to a lack of available players.)	
Rankings from STATS Poll released prior to the game; All times are in Central time

== Game summaries ==
=== At No. 7 Illinois State ===
South Dakota Coyotes at No. 7 Illinois State Redbirds – Game summary

Quarter	1	2	3	4	Total
Coyotes	0	17	7	3	27
No. 7 Illinois State	7	10	0	3	20

at Hancock Stadium, Normal, Illinois

- Date: February 27
- Game time: 12:00 p.m. CST
- Game weather: Sunny and clear, 48 °F (9 °C)
- Game attendance: 1,853
- Referee: Art Brown
- TV: ESPN+
- Box score, Recap

Game information
First quarter
- ILST – Timothy McClon 1-yard run (Aidan Bresnahan kick), 4:13. Redbirds 7–0. Drive: 13 plays, 88 yards, 7:20.

Second quarter

- ILST – Aidan Bresnahan 29-yard field goal, 12:08. Redbirds 10–0. Drive: 8 plays, 68 yards, 3:32.
- ILST – Taylor Grimes 59-yard pass from Bryce Jefferson (Aidan Bresnahan kick), 9:15. Redbirds 17–0. Drive: 6 plays, 79 yards, 1:39.
- SDAK – Mason Lorber 34-yard field goal, 4:07. Redbirds 17–3. Drive: 9 plays, 19 yards, 3:03.
- SDAK – Caleb Vander Esch 23-yard pass from Carson Camp (Mason Lorber kick), 2:21. Redbirds 17–10. Drive: 4 plays, 36 yards, 1:29.
- SDAK – Carson Camp 15-yard run (Mason Lorber kick), 0:13. Tied 17–17. Drive: 4 plays, 30 yards, 0:32.

Third quarter

- SADK – Carter Bell 5-yard pass from Carson Camp (Mason Lorber kick), 10:01. Coyotes 24–17. Drive: 3 plays, 27 yards, 1:05.

Fourth quarter

- SDAK – Mason Lorber 31-yard field goal, 12:55. Coyotes 27–17. Drive: 12 plays, 43 yards, 4:12.
- ILST – Aidan Bresnahan 25-yard field goal, 10:00. Coyotes 27–20. Drive: 8 plays, 71 yards, 2:50.

Statistics	SDAK	ILST
First downs	17	18
Total yards	300	447
Rushing yards	79	167
Passing yards	221	280
Turnovers	1	7
Time of possession	30:14	29:46

Team	Category	Player	Statistics
South Dakota	Passing	Carson Camp	20/35, 221 yards, 2 TD, INT
South Dakota	Rushing	Kai Henry	16 rushes, 35 yards
South Dakota	Receiving	Carter Bell	4 receptions, 64 yards, TD
Illinois State	Passing	Bryce Jefferson	15/33, 280 yards, TD, 4 INT
Illinois State	Rushing	Phaleak Brown	17 rushes, 86 yards
Illinois State	Receiving	Austin Nagel	5 receptions, 132 yards

=== At No. 4 North Dakota ===
No. 20 South Dakota Coyotes at No. 4 North Dakota Fighting Hawks – Game summary

Quarter	1	2	3	4	Total
No. 20 Coyotes	3	0	0	7	10
No. 4 Fighting Hawks	0	7	14	0	21

at Alerus Center, Grand Forks, North Dakota

- Date: March 4
- Game time: 5:00 p.m. CST
- Game weather: None (played indoors)
- Game attendance: 3,491
- Referee: Andrew Speciale
- TV: ESPN+
- Box score, Recap

Game information
First quarter
- SDAK – Mason Lorber 20-yard field goal, 10:29. Coyotes 3–0. Drive: 7 plays, 60 yards, 0:59.

Second quarter

- UND – Adam Zavalney 21-yard pass from Quincy Vaughn (Adam Stage kick), 14:14. Fighting Hawks 7–3. Drive: 10 plays, 66 yards, 5:01.

Third quarter

- UND – Otis Weah 18-yard run (Adam Stage kick), 13:02. Fighting Hawks 14–3. Drive: 4 plays, 75 yards, 1:58.
- UND – Otis Weah 5-yard run (Adam Stage kick), 7:46. Fighting Hawks 21–3. Drive: 7 plays, 65 yards, 3:22.

Fourth quarter

- SDAK – Kai Henry 7-yard run (Mason Lorber kick), 10:58. Fighting Hawks 21–10. Drive: 15 plays, 95 yards, 5:04.

Statistics	SDAK	UND
First downs	18	25
Total yards	328	489
Rushing yards	129	249
Passing yards	199	240
Turnovers	1	2
Time of possession	24:52	35:08

Team	Category	Player	Statistics
South Dakota	Passing	Carson Camp	19/31, 193 yards, INT
South Dakota	Rushing	Kai Henry	15 rushes, 84 yards, TD
South Dakota	Receiving	Caleb Vander Esch	7 receptions, 57 yards
North Dakota	Passing	Tommy Schuster	23/35, 219 yards, INT
North Dakota	Rushing	Otis Weah	16 rushes, 163 yards, 2 TD
North Dakota	Receiving	Garett Maag	3 receptions, 75 yards

=== Missouri State ===
Missouri State Bears at No. 21 South Dakota Coyotes – Game summary

Quarter	1	2	3	4	Total
Bears	7	10	7	3	27
No. 21 Coyotes	14	3	7	0	24

at DakotaDome, Vermillion, South Dakota

- Date: March 13
- Game time: 1:00 p.m. CST
- Game weather: None (played indoors)
- Game attendance: 2,051
- Referee: Rick Warne
- TV announcers (ESPN+): Jay Elsen (play-by-play) and Andre Fields (analyst)
- Box score, Recap

Game information
First quarter
- SDAK – Kai Henry 8-yard run (Mason Lorber kick), 2:32. Coyotes 7–0. Drive: 6 plays, 40 yards, 1:51.
- MOST – Montrae Braswell 100-yard kickoff return (Jose Pizano kick), 2:21. Tied 7–7.
- SDAK – Travis Theis 31-yard run (Mason Lorber kick), 0:50. Coyotes 14–7. Drive: 4 plays, 75 yards, 1:31.

Second quarter

- MOST – Jose Pizano 21-yard field goal, 9:51. Coyotes 14–10. Drive: 14 plays, 80 yards, 5:53.
- MOST – Montrae Braswell 36-yard interception return (Jose Pizano kick), 8:55. Bears 17–14.
- SDAK – Mason Lorber 21-yard field goal, 4:33. Tied 17–17. Drive: 11 plays, 83 yards, 4:22.

Third quarter

- SDAK – Carter Bell 36-yard pass from Carson Camp (Mason Lorber kick), 7:48. Coyotes 24–17. Drive: 4 plays, 82 yards, 1:03.
- MOST – Jeremiah Wilson 6-yard run (Jose Pizano kick), 3:41. Tied 24–24. Drive: 11 plays, 75 yards, 4:07.

Fourth quarter

- MOST – Jose Pizano 28-yard field goal, 7:51. Bears 27–24. Drive: 9 plays, 42 yards, 4:44.

Statistics	MOST	SDAK
First downs	18	26
Total yards	330	440
Rushing yards	163	102
Passing yards	167	339
Turnovers	0	1
Time of possession	31:51	28:09

Team	Category	Player	Statistics
Missouri State	Passing	Jaden Johnson	16/25, 136 yards
Missouri State	Rushing	Jeremiah Wilson	13 rushes, 53 yards, TD
Missouri State	Receiving	Damoriea Vick	4 receptions, 68 yards
South Dakota	Passing	Carson Camp	22/34, 339 yards, TD, INT
South Dakota	Rushing	Kai Henry	23 rushes, 76 yards, TD
South Dakota	Receiving	Carter Bell	6 receptions, 106 yards, TD

=== At Youngstown State ===
South Dakota Coyotes at Youngstown State Penguins – Game summary

Quarter	1	2	3	4	Total
Coyotes	0	3	0	7	10
Penguins	8	3	10	7	28

at Stambaugh Stadium, Youngstown, Ohio

- Date: March 20
- Game time: 11:00 a.m. CST
- Game weather: Sunny, 43 °F (6 °C)
- Game attendance: 2,159
- Referee: Art Brown
- TV: ESPN+
- Box score, Recap

Game information
First quarter
- YSU – Christian Turner 10-yard pass from Marik Waid (Marik Waid pass to London Pearson), 7:26. Penguins 8–0. Drive: 13 plays, 69 yards, 6:33.

Second quarter

- YSU – Colten McFadden 32-yard field goal, 11:03. Penguins 11–0. Drive: 12 plays, 65 yards, 7:19.
- SDAK – Mason Lorber 37-yard field goal, 6:02. Penguins 11–3. Drive: 6 plays, 15 yards, 2:46.

Third quarter

- YSU – Marik Waid 1-yard run (Colten McFadden kick), 7:47. Penguins 18–3. Drive: 8 plays, 29 yards, 3:26.
- YSU – Colten McFadden 41-yard field goal, 1:44. Penguins 21–3. Drive: 7 plays, 34 yards, 3:51.

Fourth quarter

- YSU – Christian Turner 38-yard run (Colten McFadden kick), 12:45. Penguins 28–3. Drive: 5 plays, 71 yards, 2:36.
- SDAK – Travis Theis 1-yard run (Mason Lorber kick), 8:35. Penguins 28–10. Drive: 11 plays, 75 yards, 4:10.

Statistics	SDAK	YSU
First downs	13	21
Total yards	226	388
Rushing yards	12	304
Passing yards	214	84
Turnovers	3	2
Time of possession	21:48	38:12

Team	Category	Player	Statistics
South Dakota	Passing	Carson Camp	21/30, 214 yards, INT
South Dakota	Rushing	Travis Theis	8 rushes, 15 yards, TD
South Dakota	Receiving	Caleb Vander Esch	9 receptions, 102 yards
Youngstown State	Passing	Marik Waid	9/13, 84 yards, TD
Youngstown State	Rushing	Jaleel McLaughlin	28 rushes, 166 yards
Youngstown State	Receiving	Malick Mbodj	2 receptions, 25 yards
