= Jared Elliott =

American football coach

Current position
- Title: Tight ends coach
- Team: Illinois
- Conference: Big Ten

Biographical details
- Born: Franklin, Tennessee, U.S.
- Education: Miami University (2007)

Playing career
- 2004–2007: Miami (OH)
- Positions: Quarterback, wide receiver

Coaching career (HC unless noted)
- 2008–2009: Missouri Southern State (WR)
- 2010–2011: Miami (OH) (GA)
- 2012: Western Illinois (QB)
- 2013–2015: Carthage (co-OC)
- 2016: Western Illinois (assistant)
- 2017: Western Illinois (co-OC)
- 2018–2021: Western Illinois
- 2022: Ball State (PGC/TE)
- 2023: Ball State (co-OC/TE)
- 2024: Ball State (OC/TE)
- 2025: New Mexico (TE)
- 2026–present: Illinois (TE)

Head coaching record
- Overall: 9–31

Jared Elliott is an American college football coach. He is the tight ends coach for Illinois Fighting Illini football, a position he has held since 2026. Prior to this position, he was the offensive coordinator and tight ends coach for Ball State University. He served as the head football coach at Western Illinois University from 2018 to 2021, compiling a record of 9–31.

== Head coaching record ==
Year	Team	Overall	Conference	Standing	Bowl/playoffs
Western Illinois Leathernecks (Missouri Valley Football Conference) (2018–2021)
2018	Western Illinois	5–6	4–4	5th	
2019	Western Illinois	1–11	1–7	T–9th	
2020–21	Western Illinois	1–5	1–5	9th	
2021	Western Illinois	2–9	2–6	T–9th	
Western Illinois:		9–31	8–22		
Total:		9–31			
