= Doug Phillips (American football) =

American football coach (born 1968)

Current position
- Title: Head coach
- Team: Youngstown State
- Conference: MVFC
- Record: 31–35

Biographical details
- Born: February 29, 1968 (age 58)
- Education: Toledo (1991)

Coaching career (HC unless noted)
- 1991–1992: Youngstown State (GA)
- 1997–2001: Springfield Local HS (OH)
- 2002–2005: Salem HS (OH)
- 2006: Ohio State (DQC)
- 2007–2008: Bowling Green (RC/DE)
- 2017: Cincinnati (ST)
- 2018–2019: Cincinnati (RB)
- 2020–present: Youngstown State

Head coaching record
- Overall: 31–35
- Tournaments: 1–2 (NCAA D-I Playoffs)

Doug Phillips (born February 29, 1968) is an American football coach, He is the head football coach of the Youngstown State University, a position he has held since 2020. A native of New Middletown, Ohio, Phillips attended the University of Toledo from 1987 to 1991.

== Head coaching record ==
=== College ===
Year	Team	Overall	Conference	Standing	Bowl/playoffs	Coaches^{#}	TSN/STATS^{°}
Youngstown State Penguins (Missouri Valley Football Conference) (2020–present)
2020–21	Youngstown State	1–6	1–6	10th			
2021	Youngstown State	3–7	2–6	T–9th			
2022	Youngstown State	7–4	5–3	T–3rd			
2023	Youngstown State	8–5	5–3	T–3rd	L NCAA Division I Second Round	23	21
2024	Youngstown State	4–8	3–5	T–6th			
2025	Youngstown State	8–5	5–3	T–3rd	L NCAA Division I First Round	17	18
Youngstown State:		31–35	21–26				
Total:		31–35					
