= Matt Merkens =

American football coach

Playing career
- 2010–2012: Sam Houston State
- Position: Quarterback

Coaching career (HC unless noted)
- 2013–2014: Sam Houston State (SA)
- 2015: Western Colorado (GA)
- 2016–2017: Sam Houston State (OA)
- 2018–2019: Sam Houston State (OQC)
- 2020–2022: Sam Houston State (TE)
- 2022: Sam Houston State (OC/QB)
- 2023–2025: Sam Houston State (TE)

Matt Merkens is an American football coach who was most recently the tight ends coach for Sam Houston State.

== Playing career ==
Merkens grew up in Marble Falls, Texas and attended Marble Falls High School. After high school, he enrolled at Sam Houston State University (SHSU) and joined the Bearkats football team as a walk-on. Merkens was a backup quarterback for the Bearkats for three seasons.

== Coaching career ==
Merkens began his coaching career as a student coaching intern at Sam Houston State for his final two seasons at the school. After graduating in 2015, he was hired as a graduate assistant at Western Colorado. Merkens returned to Sam Houston State as an offensive assistant after one season and worked primarily with wide receivers before being promoted to an offensive quality control position in 2018. He was promoted to tight ends coach prior to the start of the 2020–21 NCAA Division I FCS football season. During the 2022 season, Merkens was promoted to offensive coordinator and quarterbacks coach following the demotion of coordinator John Perry. He was moved back to coaching tight ends after SHSU hired Brad Cornelsen as offensive coordinator.

== Personal life ==
Merkens' father, Guido Merkens, played quarterback at Sam Houston State and in the National Football League.
