= Elerson Smith =

American football player (born 1998)

No. 58, 94, 52
- Position: Defensive end

Personal information
- Born: July 17, 1998 (age 28); Minneapolis, Minnesota, U.S.
- Listed height: 6 ft 6 in (1.98 m)
- Listed weight: 255 lb (116 kg)

Career information
- High school: Minneapolis South
- College: Northern Iowa (2016–2020)
- NFL draft: 2021: 4th round, 116th overall pick

Career history
- New York Giants (2021–2022); New York Jets (2023)*; Las Vegas Raiders (2023–2024)*; Cleveland Browns (2024)
- * Offseason or practice squad member only

Awards and highlights
- First-team All-MVFC (2020)

Career NFL statistics
- Total tackles: 13
- Forced fumbles: 1
- Stats at Pro Football Reference

Elerson G. Smith (born July 17, 1998) is an American former professional football player who was a defensive end in the National Football League (NFL). He played in the league for the New York Giants, New York Jets, Las Vegas Raiders and Cleveland Browns. He played college football for the Northern Iowa Panthers and was selected by the Giants in the fourth round of the 2021 NFL draft.

== Early life ==
Smith was born and grew up in Minneapolis, Minnesota, and attended Minneapolis South High School. He also lettered in track and field, wrestling and basketball.

== College career ==
Smith redshirted his true freshman season and did not play in any games as a redshirt freshman. He started seeing playing time as a redshirt sophomore and finished the season with 19 tackles, 10.5 tackles for loss, 7.5 sacks, and a forced fumble. Smith was named first-team All-Missouri Valley Football Conference and a first-team FCS All-American by the AFCA after recording 63 total tackles, 14 sacks, 21.5 tackles for loss and five forced fumbles. Smith was named the Preseason Defensive Player of the Year before announcing that he would forgo his redshirt senior season, which was to be played in the spring due to Covid-19, and prepare for the 2021 NFL draft. Smith played in the 2021 Senior Bowl.

== Professional career ==
Pre-draft measurables
Height	Weight	Arm length	Hand span	40-yard dash	10-yard split	20-yard split	20-yard shuttle	Three-cone drill	Vertical jump	Broad jump	Bench press
6 ft 6 1/4 in (1.99 m)	252 lb (114 kg)	34 in (0.86 m)	10 1/4 in (0.26 m)	4.75 s	1.60 s	2.76 s	4.39 s	7.11 s	41.5 in (1.05 m)	10 ft 7 in (3.23 m)	26 reps
All values from Pro Day

=== New York Giants ===
Smith was selected in the fourth round with the 116th overall pick of the 2021 NFL draft by the New York Giants. Smith signed his four-year rookie contract with the Giants on May 25, 2021. He was placed on injured reserve on September 1, to start the season. On November 6, Smith was activated from injured reserve. On January 5, 2022, Smith was placed on injured reserve with a neck injury.

On August 31, 2022, Smith was placed on injured reserve. He was activated from injured reserve on October 29. He was placed back on injured reserve on December 16.

On July 25, 2023, Smith was waived by the Giants.

=== New York Jets ===
On October 11, 2023, Smith was signed to the practice squad of the New York Jets . He was released on November 1.

=== Las Vegas Raiders ===
On November 22, 2023, Smith was signed to the Las Vegas Raiders practice squad. He signed a reserve/future contract on January 8, 2024. Smith was waived/injured by the team on August 27.

=== Cleveland Browns ===
On September 25, 2024, Smith was signed to the Cleveland Browns practice squad. He was promoted to the active roster on November 16. He was waived on November 27, and re-signed to the practice squad. He signed a reserve/future contract with Cleveland on January 6, 2025. On July 16, Smith retired from professional football.
