= List of Missouri State Bears football seasons =

The following is a list of Missouri State Bears football seasons for the football team that has represented Missouri State University in NCAA competition.

== Seasons ==
Year	Coach	Overall	Conference	Standing	Bowl/playoffs	Coaches^{#}	TSN/STATS^{°}
Walter Langston (Independent) (1909)
1909	Walter Langston	4–2					
Walter Langston:		4–2					
Corliss Buchanan (Independent) (1910–1911)
1910	Corliss Buchanan	1–4					
1911	Corliss Buchanan	1–6					
Corliss Buchanan:		2–10					
Arthur W. Briggs (Independent) (1912–1917)
1912	Arthur W. Briggs	0–3					
1913	No team						
1914	Arthur W. Briggs	6–0					
1915	Arthur W. Briggs	4–2					
1916	Arthur W. Briggs	2–2–2					
1917	Arthur W. Briggs	3–2					
Paul Andrews (Independent) (1918)
1918	Paul Andrews	1–2					
Paul Andrews:		1–2					
Arthur W. Briggs (Missouri Intercollegiate Athletic Association) (1919–1933)
1919	Arthur W. Briggs	3–4	2–2	T–7th			
1920	Arthur W. Briggs	2–6	2–4	6th			
1921	Arthur W. Briggs	3–5	3–4	7th			
1922	Arthur W. Briggs	7–0	7–0	1st			
1923	Arthur W. Briggs	7–2	3–1	3rd			
1924	Arthur W. Briggs	1–6–1	0–3–1				
1925	Arthur W. Briggs	4–2–2	2–1–1	2nd			
1926	Arthur W. Briggs	3–5	1–3	4th			
1927	Arthur W. Briggs	4–3	2–2	3rd			
1928	Arthur W. Briggs	7–1–1	3–0–1	T–1st			
1929	Arthur W. Briggs	6–2–1	2–1–1	2nd			
1930	Arthur W. Briggs	4–5	2–2	3rd			
1931	Arthur W. Briggs	5–2–1	2–1–1	T–2nd			
1932	Arthur W. Briggs	3–2–2	2–2–1	2nd			
1933	Arthur W. Briggs	2–5	0–4	5th			
Arthur W. Briggs:		76–59–10	33–30–6				
Andrew McDonald (Missouri Intercollegiate Athletic Association) (1934–1937)
1934	Andrew McDonald	1–5–1	1–3	4th			
1935	Andrew McDonald	3–4–1	2–2–1	T–3rd			
1936	Andrew McDonald	1–5–2	0–4–1	6th			
1937	Andrew McDonald	0–8–1	0–5	6th			
Andrew McDonald:		5–22–5					
Red Blair (Missouri Intercollegiate Athletic Association) (1938–1946)
1938	Red Blair	5–2–2	2–2–1	3rd			
1939	Red Blair	7–1–1	3–1–1	2nd			
1940	Red Blair	10–0	5–0	1st			
1941	Red Blair	8–3	3–2	4th			
1942	Red Blair	2–7–2	2–2	T–3rd			
1943	No team – WWII						
1944	No team – WWII						
1945	Red Blair	5–1–2					
1946	Red Blair	2–6	1–4	5th			
Red Blair:		39–20–7	16–11–2				
Tommy O'Boyle (Missouri Intercollegiate Athletic Association) (1947–1948)
1947	Tommy O'Boyle	7–2–1	3–1–1	T–2nd			
1948	Tommy O'Boyle	9–2	4–1	T–1st	L Missouri-Kansas		
Tommy O'Boyle:		16–4–1	7–2–1				
Fred Thomsen (Missouri Intercollegiate Athletic Association) (1949–1952)
1949	Fred Thomsen	5–4–1	3–1–1	T–2nd			
1950	Fred Thomsen	5–4–2	3–1–1	2nd			
1951	Fred Thomsen	6–3–1	4–0–1	T–1st			
1952	Fred Thomsen	3–6	1–4	T–5th			
Fred Thomsen:		19–17–4	11–6–3				
Bill Dellastatious (Missouri Intercollegiate Athletic Association) (1953–1954)
1953	Bill Dellastatious	3–6	3–2	2nd			
1954	Bill Dellastatious	2–6	1–4	T–4th			
Bill Dellastatious:		5–12	4–6				
Harold "Tuffy" Stratton (Missouri Intercollegiate Athletic Association) (1955)
1955	Harold "Tuffy" Stratton	2–6–1	1–4	T–5th			
Harold "Tuffy" Stratton:		2–6–1	1–4				
Aldo Sebben (Missouri Intercollegiate Athletic Association) (1956–1960)
1956	Aldo Sebben	3–6	3–2	T–3rd			
1957	Aldo Sebben	4–4–1	2–3	4th			
1958	Aldo Sebben	4–5	2–3	4th			
1959	Aldo Sebben	4–5	1–4	T–5th			
1960	Aldo Sebben	2–7	2–3	4th			
Aldo Sebben:		17–21–1	10–15				
Orville Pottenger (Missouri Intercollegiate Athletic Association) (1961–1964)
1961	Orville Pottenger	4–4–1	2–3	T–4th			
1962	Orville Pottenger	5–3–1	3–2	3rd			
1963	Orville Pottenger	9–1	5–0	1st	L Mineral Water	10 (Note: Rankings from UPI coaches small college rankings)	
1964	Orville Pottenger	6–4	3–2	3rd			
Orville Pottenger:		24–12–1	13–7				
Jim Mentis (Missouri Intercollegiate Athletic Association) (1965–1968)
1965	Jim Mentis	7–3	4–1	2nd			
1966	Jim Mentis	7–4	5–0	1st	L Mineral Water		
1967	Jim Mentis	4–6	2–3	T–3rd			
1968	Jim Mentis	2–8	2–3	T–3rd			
Jim Mentis:		20–21	13–7				
Don Cross (Missouri Intercollegiate Athletic Association) (1969–1975)
1969	Don Cross	0–10	0–5	6th			
1970	Don Cross	2–7–1	1–4–1	6th			
1971	Don Cross	1–8–1	1–4–1	7th			
1972	Don Cross	4–6	2–4	5th			
1973	Don Cross	3–7	3–3	T–3rd			
1974	Don Cross	7–3	4–2	T–3rd			
1975	Don Cross	6–4–1	3–3	T–3rd			
Don Cross:		23–45–3	14–25–2				
Rich Johanningmeier (Missouri Intercollegiate Athletic Association) (1976–1980)
1976	Rich Johanningmeier	5–6	4–2	T–3rd			
1977	Rich Johanningmeier	6–3–1	3–2–1	4th			
1978	Rich Johanningmeier	8–3	6–0	1st			
1979	Rich Johanningmeier	7–4	3–3	T–3rd			
1980	Rich Johanningmeier	6–5	5–1	2nd			
Rich Johanningmeier (Association of Mid-Continent Universities) (1981–1984)
1981	Rich Johanningmeier	3–5–2	0–3	4th			
1982	Rich Johanningmeier	5–6	1–2	3rd			
1983	Rich Johanningmeier	6–5	2–1	2nd			
1984	Rich Johanningmeier	6–3–1	1–1–1	3rd			
Rich Johanningmeier (Gateway Football Conference) (1985)
1985	Rich Johanningmeier	6–4–1	2–2–1	2nd			
Rich Johanningmeier:		58–44–5	27–17–3				
Jesse Branch (Gateway Football Conference) (1986–1994)
1986	Jesse Branch	3–7	1–5	T–6th			
1987	Jesse Branch	5–6	3–3	T–3rd			
1988	Jesse Branch	5–5	4–2	T–2nd			
1989	Jesse Branch	10–3	5–1	1st	L NCAA Division I-AA Quarterfinal		9
1990	Jesse Branch	9–3	5–1	T–1st	L NCAA Division I-AA First Round		6
1991	Jesse Branch	6–4–1	3–3	3rd			
1992	Jesse Branch	6–5	4–2	T–2nd			
1993	Jesse Branch	7–4	4–2	T–2nd			
1994	Jesse Branch	4–7	2–4	T–5th			
Jesse Branch:		55–44–1	31–23				
Del Miller (Gateway Football Conference) (1995–1998)
1995	Del Miller	4–7	1–5	7th			
1996	Del Miller	7–4	3–2	T–2nd			21
1997	Del Miller	5–6	3–3	4th			
1998	Del Miller	5–6	3–3	T–3rd			
Del Miller:		21–23	10–13				
Randy Ball (Gateway Football Conference) (1999–2005)
1999	Randy Ball	5–6	2–4	T–4th			
2000	Randy Ball	5–6	2–4	T–5th			
2001	Randy Ball	6–5	3–4	5th			
2002	Randy Ball	4–7	1–6	8th			
2003	Randy Ball	4–7	1–6	7th			
2004	Randy Ball	6–5	3–4	4th			
2005	Randy Ball	4–6	2–5	7th			
Randy Ball:		34–42	14–33				
Terry Allen (Gateway Football Conference/Missouri Valley Football Conference) (2006–2014)
2006	Terry Allen	2–9	1–6	T–7th			
2007	Terry Allen	6–5	2–4	T–5th			
2008	Terry Allen	4–7	3–5	T–6th			
2009	Terry Allen	6–5	4–4	T–5th			
2010	Terry Allen	5–6	4–4	T–3rd			
2011	Terry Allen	2–9	2–6	T–7th			
2012	Terry Allen	3–8	3–5	8th			
2013	Terry Allen	5–7	5–3	T–2nd			
2014	Terry Allen	4–8	1–7	9th			
Terry Allen:		37–64	25–44				
Dave Steckel (Missouri Valley Football Conference) (2015–2019)
2015	Dave Steckel	1–10	0–8	10th			
2016	Dave Steckel	4–7	2–6	T–8th			
2017	Dave Steckel	3–8	2–6	T–8th			
2018	Dave Steckel	4–7	2–6	9th			
2019	Dave Steckel	1–10	1–7	T–9th			
Dave Steckel:		13–42	7–33				
Bobby Petrino (Missouri Valley Football Conference) (2020–2022)
2020	Bobby Petrino	5–5	5–1	T–1st	L NCAA Division I First Round	13	13
2021	Bobby Petrino	8–4	6–2	2nd	L NCAA Division I First Round	14	14
2022	Bobby Petrino	5–6	3–5	8th			
Bobby Petrino:		18–15	14–8				
Ryan Beard (Missouri Valley Football Conference) (2023–2024)
2023	Ryan Beard	4–7	3–5	9th			
2024	Ryan Beard	8–4	6–2	T–4th			
Ryan Beard (Conference USA) (2025)
2025	Ryan Beard	7–6	5–3	5th	L Xbox Bowl		
Ryan Beard:		19–16	14–10				
Casey Woods (Conference USA) (2026–present)
2026	Casey Woods	0–0	0–0				
Total:		502–550–39					
National championship Conference title Conference division title or championship game berth
^{†}Indicates Bowl Coalition, Bowl Alliance, BCS, or CFP / New Years' Six bowl.; ^{#}Rankings from final Coaches Poll.
