= List of Missouri State Bears basketball head coaches =

The following is a list of Missouri State Bears basketball head coaches. There have been 18 head coaches of the Bears in their 111-season history.

Missouri State's current head coach is Cuonzo Martin. He returned as the Bears' head coach in March 2024, replacing Dana Ford, who was fired after the 2023–24 season.

No.	Tenure	Coach	Years	Record	Pct.
1	1908–1910	W. A. Daggett	2	11–9	.550
2	1910–1911	Corliss Buchanan	1	13–8	.619
3	1913–1918; 1919–1923	Arthur W. Briggs	9	106–31	.774
4	1918–1919	Paul Andrews	1	2–4	.333
5	1923–1924	Chester Barnard	1	13–1	.929
6	1924–1925	Donald Holwerda	1	9–6	.600
7	1925–1950 (Note: Missouri State did not field a team between 1943 and 1945.)	Andrew McDonald	23	302–166	.645
8	1950–1953	Bob Vanatta	3	73–12	.859
9	1953–1964	Edwin Matthews	11	164–91	.643
10	1964–1980	Bill Thomas	16	265–158	.626
11	1980–1983	Bob Cleeland	3	39–46	.459
12	1983–1992	Charlie Spoonhour	9	197–81	.709
13	1992–1995	Mark Bernsen	3	48–37	.565
14	1995–1999	Steve Alford	4	78–48	.619
15	1999–2008	Barry Hinson	9	169–117	.591
16	2008–2011	Cuonzo Martin	3	61–41	.598
17	2011–2018	Paul Lusk	7	106–121	.467
18	2018–2024	Dana Ford	6	106–82	.564
19	2024–present	Cuonzo Martin	1	9–23	.281
Totals		18 coaches	113 seasons	1,771–1,082	.621
Records updated through end of 2024–25 season Source
