= Bjørvik Jacobsen =

Norwegian hunter, trapper, and author

Bjørvik Jacobsen (16 July 1916 – 15 October 2000) was a Norwegian trapper/hunter and author. He was the son of Wanny Woldstad. The winters of 1933–1934 and 1934–1935, he wintered in Hyttevika by Hornsund with his mother and his brother Alf.

He wintered at Harmon (Halvmåneøya) in 1947. He brought the polar bear cub "Sebben" back to Tromsø.

He had a teacher's education, and settled in Nordreisa Municipality. He wrote two books and a series of articles about life as a trapper based on his experiences. The books are titled Halvmåneøya and Drama i ishavet.

In his later years he lived and married in Gryllefjord on the island of Senja in Troms.

== Bibliography ==
- Halvmåneøya: en fangstberetning fra Svalbard - Oslo, Tiden, 1983. ISBN 82-10-02513-9
- Drama i Ishavet: M/S «Enigheten»s tragiske forlis - Oslo, Gyldendal 1986. ISBN 82-05-16918-7
