= Missouri State Bears football =

Football program representing Missouri State University

2026 Missouri State Bears football team
- First season: 1909; 117 years ago
- Head coach: Casey Woods; 1st season, 3–6 (.333)
- Location: Springfield, Missouri, U.S.
- Stadium: Robert W. Plaster Stadium (capacity: 17,500)
- NCAA division: Division I FBS
- Conference: Conference USA
- Colors: Maroon and white
- All-time record: 508–549–39 (.481)
- Bowl record: 0–1 (.000)

Conference championships
- MIAA: 1928, 1940, 1948, 1951, 1963, 1966, 1978 MVFC: 1989, 1990, 2020
- Fight song: The Scotsman
- Mascot: Boomer
- Marching band: The Pride
- Outfitter: Adidas
- Website: missouristatebears.com

The Missouri State Bears football program is the college football team that represents Missouri State University located in Springfield, Missouri, United States. Missouri State competes in the NCAA Division I Football Bowl Subdivision (FBS) and is a member of Conference USA. The program is in the two-year transition up to FBS; it joined Conference USA in 2025 and will become a full FBS member in 2026.

The school was known as Southwest Missouri State until 2005 when they changed the name to Missouri State. Missouri State's first football team was fielded in 1909 and the first coach in program history was Walter Langston who went 4–2 in his only season as head coach. Prior to 1923, the team competed as an Independent. From 1923 to 1980, Missouri State were members of the Missouri Intercollegiate Athletics Association (now Mid-America Intercollegiate Athletics Association), of which Missouri State was a founding member. During that time the Bears were classified in the NCAA College Division from 1958 to 1972. From 1973 to 1980 the Bears played in NCAA Division II. Missouri State moved up to the Association of Mid-Continent Universities in time for the 1981 season, which was their first season in NCAA Division I-AA. In 1985, the Bears became a founding member of the Gateway Football Conference which later became the Missouri Valley Football Conference in 2008.

Missouri State has an all-time record of 492–532–39 and have won 10 conference championships. They won their most recent conference championship in 2020. Missouri State was ranked second in the country for 3 weeks from October 15 to 29, 1990. This is still the highest ranking in school history. The team plays its home games at the 17,500-seat Robert W. Plaster Stadium which has been its home since 1941. The Bears have had 23 head coaches in their history, including their current head coach Casey Woods.

== History ==
=== Classifications ===
- 1958–1972: NCAA College Division
- 1973–1980: NCAA Division II
- 1982–2024: NCAA Division I-AA/FCS
- 2025–present: NCAA Division I FBS

=== Conference memberships ===
- 1909–1923: Independent
- 1924–1980: Missouri Intercollegiate Athletic Association†
- 1981–1984: Mid-Continent Conference
- 1985–2024: Gateway Football Conference/Missouri Valley Football Conference†
- 2025–present: Conference USA

†Founding member of the conference

== Head coaches ==
Since 1909, the Missouri State Bears have had 23 different head coaches. The first coach in program history was Walter Langston who coached the team for one year. Arthur Briggs is the longest tenured head coach with two non consecutive runs as head coach. He coached the Bears for 20 seasons in total. The current coach is Casey Woods who was hired on December 19, 2025. There was no team for the 1913 season. Due to World War II, Missouri State did not field a team for the 1943–1944 seasons.

Tenure	Seasons	Coach	Record	Win percentage
1909	1	Walter Langston	4–2	.667
1910–1911	2	Corliss Buchanan	2–10	.167
1912–1917	6	Arthur W. Briggs	15–9–2	.615
1918	1	Paul Andrews	1–2	.333
1919–1933	15	Arthur W. Briggs	61–50–8	.546
1934–1937	4	A. J. McDonald	5–22–5	.234
1938–1946	9	Red Blair	38–21–6	.631
1947–1948	2	Tommy O'Boyle	16–4–1	.786
1949–1952	4	Fred Thomsen	19–17–4	.525
1953–1954	2	Bill Dellastatious	5–12	.294
1955	1	Harold "Tuffy" Stratton	2–6–1	.278
1956–1960	5	Aldo Sebben	17–27–1	.389
1961–1964	4	Orville Pottenger	24–12–2	.658
1965–1968	4	Jim Mentis	20–21	.488
1969–1975	7	Don Cross	23–45–3	.345
1976–1985	10	Rich Johanningmeier	58–44–5	.565
1986–1994	9	Jesse Branch	55–44–1	.555
1995–1998	4	Del Miller	21–23	.477
1999–2005	7	Randy Ball	34–42	.447
2006–2014	9	Terry Allen	37–64	.366
2015–2019	5	Dave Steckel	13–42	.236
2020–2022	3	Bobby Petrino	18–15	.545
2023–2025	3	Ryan Beard	19–16	.543
2026–present	1	Casey Woods	0–0	–
Total		500–536–39	.483	

== Facilities ==
=== Plaster Stadium ===
Missouri State plays all home games at Plaster Stadium, which has been their home since 1941. From its opening in 1941 to 1991 the stadium was known as Briggs Stadium. The stadium currently seats 17,500 people. It has undergone several major renovations in 1991 and, most recently, in 2014. After the 1991 renovation which added an upper deck on the west side and a row of sky-boxes and press box, the stadium was renamed in honor of Robert W. Plaster who provided the major gift for the project. The stadium was updated in 2008 with a new video board behind the south end zone. The 2014 renovation made significant changes to the east side of the stadium and the playing surface. The track was removed and the East side was completely rebuilt. The stadium record attendance is 18,386 which was at the 2014 home opener versus North Dakota. Plaster Stadium is the fourth-largest stadium in the conference and the second-largest college football specific venue in Missouri.

==== Largest crowds ====
Rank	Date	Attendance	Opponent	Result
1	September 13, 2014	18,386	North Dakota	W, 38–0
2	September 12, 2017	17,835	Chadron State	W, 21–13
3	September 19, 2026	16,010	Marshall	L, 24–30
4	October 28, 1997	15,672	Pittsburg State	L, 8–9
5	November 2, 1996	15,878	Western Illinois	L, 17–23

=== Indoor practice facility ===
In July 2018, it was reported that Missouri State was undergoing the process of securing funding to build an indoor practice facility. In a phone interview with the Springfield News-Leader, athletic director Kyle Moats talked at length about the facility. Missouri State would build the indoor facility entirely through private donations to the athletic department. The facility was to be built on the existing ROTC and band practice field. The school's athletic director Kyle Moats said "From a recruiting standpoint, others in the conference have one," Moats said. "We need to at least try and put people on equal bases." He also was quoted that the facility would be a part of their plan to continually upgrade team's facilities. The indoor facility would also be shared by some of the other athletic programs at Missouri State. In November 2019, athletic director Kyle Moats gave an update to "The Standard", the Missouri State student newspaper. He said the athletic department wasn't able to achieve the funding they needed to build the facility as some other programs became more important to address first. He said they had decided to use a more cost efficient approach and decided to build a dome over Betty and Bobby Allison North Stadium instead, to save the department over $10-$15 million. Moats said that the facility would be used by the club lacrosse team, football, soccer, track and field, baseball and softball. In the interview Moats said "We wouldn't be gaining any traction, we'd just be catching up," and "We're not trying to have the Taj Mahal, just an indoor facility." As of October 2021, there hasn't been anymore news on the facility.

=== South end zone facility ===
In late October 2021, Missouri State announced plans to build a facility in the south end zone of Plaster Stadium. The facility would house the team locker room, meeting rooms, coaches offices, and club seating. A new and upgraded video board would be added on top of the building as well. The estimated cost of the facility would be around $20 million. "We want to try to improve our position and be a contender in FCS football and be a contender for a national championship," Athletic Director Kyle Moats said.

== Honored jerseys ==
Missouri State has retired four jerseys which are memorialized over the student section of the stadium's East side, but the numbers are still available and can be chosen by future players.

Missouri State Bears honored jerseys
No.	Player	Pos.	Tenure	Ref.
1	DeAndre Smith	QB	1987–1990	
27	Ray Haley	HB	1947–1951	
71	Rich Johanningmeier	OT (Note: Also served as head coach from 1976 to 1985.)	1960–1963	
C	Arthur W. Briggs	HC	1912–1933	

== Championships ==
=== Conference championships ===
Missouri State have won ten conference championships in their history. The Bears won 7 championships in the MIAA, 2 championships in the Gateway, and one in the Missouri Valley. The first conference championship was won in 1928 under coach Arthur Briggs. Jesse Branch is the only coach to win multiple conference championships. The 1928, 1990, 2020 championships were shared titles. The Bears won their most recent conference championship in 2020, when they shared the conference title with North Dakota and South Dakota State. This title ended the 30 year conference championship drought.

Season	Conference	Coach	Overall Record	Conference Record
1928†	Missouri Intercollegiate Athletic Association	Arthur W. Briggs	7–1–1	3–0–1
1940	Missouri Intercollegiate Athletic Association	Red Blair	10–0	5–0
1948†	Missouri Intercollegiate Athletic Association	Tommy O'Boyle	9–2	4–1
1951	Missouri Intercollegiate Athletic Association	Fred Thomsen	6–3–1	4–0–1
1963	Missouri Intercollegiate Athletic Association	Orville Pottenger	9–1	5–0
1966	Missouri Intercollegiate Athletic Association	Jim Mentis	7–4	5–0
1978	Missouri Intercollegiate Athletic Association	Rich Johanningmeier	8–3	6–0
1989	Gateway Football Conference	Jesse Branch	12–1	9–0
1990†	Gateway Football Conference	Jesse Branch	8–3	6–2
2020†	Missouri Valley Football Conference	Bobby Petrino	5–5	5–1
Total Conference Championships:			10	
† Denotes co-champions

== Postseason appearances ==
=== Division I-AA/FCS playoffs ===
Missouri State has appeared in the NCAA Division I FCS playoffs four times. Under head coach Jesse Branch, the Bears made two straight trips in 1989 and 1990. In 1989 they drew a first round matchup with Maine. Missouri State won 38–35 and advanced to play Stephen F. Austin in the quarterfinals where they lost 55–25. Missouri State made it to the playoffs again in the 1990 season. They played at home against Idaho and lost 41–35. Bobby Petrino led the Bears to their third playoff appearance in 2020 and the team lost at North Dakota 44–10. Missouri State made their fourth playoff appearance in 2021 and lost to UT Martin 32–31. All of the Bears playoff appearances have come in back to back years, 1989–1990 and 2020–2021. Their all time record is 1–4.

Season	Coach	Playoff	Opponent	Result
1989	Jesse Branch	First Round; Quarterfinals	Maine; Stephen F. Austin	W, 38–35; L, 25–55
1990	Jesse Branch	First Round	Idaho	L, 35–41
2020	Bobby Petrino	First Round	North Dakota	L, 10–44
2021	Bobby Petrino	First Round	UT Martin	L, 31–32

=== Bowl games ===
Missouri State has appeared in five bowl games and are 0–5 all time.

4 out of the 5 bowl games shown below were played at the Division II level.

Season	Coach	Bowl	Opponent	Result
1948 †	Tommy O'Boyle	Missouri-Kansas Bowl	Emporia State	L 20–34
1963 †	Orville Pottenger	Mineral Water Bowl	Northern Illinois	L 14–21
1966 †	Jim Mentis	Mineral Water Bowl	Adams State	L 8–14
1989 †	Jesse Branch	Pecan Bowl	Stephen F. Austin	L 25–55
2025	Nick Petrino (interim)	Xbox Bowl	Arkansas State	L 28–34

† non-fbs bowl

Note: The 1989 Pecan Bowl was the Midwest Regional Championship (NCAA Division I-AA Playoffs Quarterfinal).

== All-time record vs. CUSA teams ==
Opponent	Won	Lost	Tied	Percentage	Streak	First	Last
Delaware	0	1	0	.000	Lost 1	2026	2026
FIU	1	1	0	.500	Lost 1	2025	2026
Jacksonville State	5	0	0	1.000	Won 5	1993	1997
Kennesaw State	1	2	0	.333	Won 1	2019	2026
Liberty	2	1	0	.667	Won 1	1989	2025
Middle Tennessee	1	1	0	.500	Won 1	1986	2025
New Mexico State	2	0	0	1.000	Won 2	2025	2026
Sam Houston	2	1	0	.667	Won 2	2004	2026
Western Kentucky	2	10	0	.167	Lost 10	1984	2026
Totals	16	17	0	.485			

== Notable players ==
=== Current NFL players ===
Player	Position	1st Year	Draft round	Teams
Dylan Cole	MLB	2017	Undrafted	Tennessee Titans, Chicago Bears
Eric Johnson	DE	2022	5	Indianapolis Colts
Jacardia Wright	RB	2025	Undrafted	Seattle Seahawks
Jacob Clark	QB	2026	Undrafted	Las Vegas Raiders

=== Former NFL players ===
Player	Position	1st Year	Draft round	Teams
Charlie Mitchell	C	1945	28	Chicago Bears
Henry May	T	1951	17	Chicago Cardinals
Bob Dees	T	1952	18	Los Angeles Rams
Paul Mullins	T	1953		New York Giants
Ben Koeneman	C	1957		San Francisco 49ers
Bill Kaczmarek	T	1958	25	San Francisco 49ers
Glenn Sowder	T	1961		Denver Broncos
Rich Johanningmeier	T	1964		Houston Oilers
Pat Talburt	DT	1966	16	Kansas City Chiefs
Sam McDowell	T	1968	9	Miami Dolphins
Tom Mullen	T	1974	2	New York Giants
Tom McIntyre	FB	1974		Houston Oilers
Fred Tabron	RB	1974	7	Minnesota Vikings
Bob Grana	TE	1975		St. Louis Cardinals
Dennis Heim	DT	1978	11	New York Giants
Mike Murphy	LB	1979	6	Houston Oilers
Tim Ries	DB	1979	7	Houston Oilers
Jan Stahle	K	1979		Houston Oilers
Chris Sella	LB	1979		New Orleans Saints
John Finders	FB	1983		Dallas Cowboys
Darrin Newbold	LB	1983	7	New York Jets
Mike Armentrout	DB	1985	9	Kansas City Chiefs
Rick Fulton	DT	1985		New York Giants
Keith Williams	RB	1986	6	Atlanta Falcons
Brad Sellenrick	T	1986		Green Bay Packers
Steve Ache	LB	1987		Minnesota Vikings
Matt Soraghan	LB	1988		Green Bay Packers
Jason Whittle	G	1998		New York Giants, Tampa Bay Buccaneers, Minnesota Vikings, Buffalo Bills
Brad St. Louis	Long snapper	2000	7	Cincinnati Bengals
Clay Harbor	TE	2010	4	Philadelphia Eagles, Jacksonville Jaguars, New England Patriots, Detroit Lions, New Orleans Saints, Team 9 (XFL)
David Arkin	G	2011	4	Dallas Cowboys, Miami Dolphins, Seattle Seahawks, Indianapolis Colts, St. Louis Rams / Los Angeles Rams

== Future non-conference opponents ==
Announced schedules as of November 19, 2026.

2027	2028	2029	2030	2031	2032	2033	2034	2035
at Mississippi State	at Oklahoma	at Missouri	at Tulsa	Wyoming	Tulsa	at Missouri	at Auburn	at Wyoming
at Cincinnati	at Arkansas State	at Texas Tech	at Wisconsin					
Fordham								
Arkansas State								
