= 2020 Missouri State Bears football team =

American college football season

2020 Missouri State Bears football

MVFC co-champion

NCAA Division I First Round, L 10–44 at North Dakota
- Conference: Missouri Valley Football Conference

Ranking
- STATS: No. 13
- FCS Coaches: No. 13
- Record: 5–5 (5–1 MVFC)
- Head coach: Bobby Petrino (1st season)
- Offensive coordinator: Nick Petrino (1st season)
- Offensive scheme: Multiple
- Defensive coordinator: Ryan Beard (1st season)
- Base defense: 3–4
- Captains: Daniel Allen; Kevin Ellis; Jaden Johnson; Zack Sanders; Damoriea Vick; Titus Wall
- Home stadium: Robert W. Plaster Stadium

2020 Missouri Valley Football Conference standings
	Conf.			Overall
Team	W		L	W		L
No. 2 South Dakota State +^	5	–	1	8	–	2
No. 12 Missouri State +^	5	–	1	5	–	5
No. 7 North Dakota ^	4	–	1	5	–	2
No. 6 North Dakota State ^	5	–	2	7	–	3
No. 14 Southern Illinois ^	3	–	3	6	–	4
Northern Iowa	3	–	4	3	–	4
South Dakota	1	–	3	1	–	3
Illinois State†	1	–	3	1	–	3
Western Illinois†	1	–	5	1	–	5
Youngstown State	1	–	6	1	–	6
+ – Conference co-champions; ^ – FCS playoff participant; Note: Indiana State opted out of the spring season. † – Illinois State and Western Illinois opted out of the remainder of the spring season on March 21 and April 5, 2021, respectively.; Rankings from STATS Poll

The 2020 Missouri State Bears football team represented Missouri State University as a member of the Missouri Valley Football Conference (MVFC) during 2020–21 NCAA Division I FCS football season. Led by first-year head coach Bobby Petrino, the Bears compiled an overall record of 5–5 with a mark of 5–1 in conference playing, sharing the MVFC title with South Dakota State. For the first time since 1990, Missouri State advanced to the NCAA Division I Football Championship playoffs, where the Bears lost in the first round to North Dakota. Missouri State finished the season ranked 13th in both the STATS and FCS Coaches polls. The team played home games at Robert W. Plaster Stadium in Springfield, Missouri.

Petrino was hired in January 2020, succeeding Dave Steckel as the program's head coach.

== Schedule ==
Missouri State had a game scheduled against Tarleton State, and Montana which were later canceled due to the COVID-19 pandemic. The Bears played three games in the Fall. One at Oklahoma to open the season and then a home and home series with Central Arkansas The home game vs. Central Arkansas was Missouri State's Homecoming game. The Bears played a conference only schedule in the Spring. The opener against Illinois State was postponed to April 17 after winter storms made the playing surface unplayable after it was covered in snow and ice. They had two games canceled in the Spring. Illinois State opted out of the season after playing four games. The game vs. North Dakota was canceled following a positive test in the Fighting Hawks program.

Date	Time	Opponent	Rank	Site	TV	Result	Attendance
September 12	7:00 p.m.	at No. 5 (FBS) Oklahoma*		Gaylord Family Oklahoma Memorial Stadium; Norman, OK	FSOK PPV	L 0–48	22,700
September 26	7:00 p.m.	at No. 11 Central Arkansas*		Estes Stadium; Conway, AR	ESPN3	L 20–27	2,500
October 17	7:00 p.m.	No. 11 Central Arkansas*^{†}		Robert W. Plaster Stadium; Springfield, MO	ESPN3	L 24–33	5,489
February 27	12:00 p.m.	at Western Illinois		Hanson Field; Macomb, IL	ESPN+	W 30–24	421
March 6	2:00 p.m.	No. 6 North Dakota State		Robert W. Plaster Stadium; Springfield, MO	ESPN+	L 0–25	3,147
March 13	1:00 p.m.	at No. 21 South Dakota		DakotaDome; Vermillion, SD	ESPN+	W 27–24	2,051
March 20	4:00 p.m.	at No. 10 Northern Iowa		UNI-Dome; Cedar Falls, IA	ESPN+	W 13–6	1,608
March 27	2:00 p.m.	No. 10 Southern Illinois		Robert W. Plaster Stadium; Springfield, MO	ESPN+	W 30–27	3,581
April 3	11:00 a.m.	at No. 6 North Dakota	No. 19	Alerus Center; Grand Forks, ND	ESPN+	Canceled	
April 10	2:00 p.m.	Youngstown State	No. 15	Robert W. Plaster Stadium; Springfield, MO	ESPN+	W 21–10	2,948
April 17		Illinois State	No. 14	Robert W. Plaster Stadium; Springfield, MO		Canceled (Note: On March 21, 2021, Illinois State announced that it would opt-out of the remainder of the 2021 spring season due to safety concerns related to the COVID-19 pandemic.)	
April 24	3:00 p.m.	at No. 7 North Dakota	No. 12	Alerus Center; Grand Forks, ND (NCAA Division I First Round)	ESPN3	L 10–44	
*Non-conference game; ^{†}Homecoming; Rankings from STATS Poll released prior to the game; All times are in Central time

== Rankings ==
Ranking movements Legend: ██ Increase in ranking ██ Decrease in ranking — = Not ranked RV = Received votes
	Week										
Poll	Pre	1	2	3	4	5	6	7	8	9	Final
STATS FCS	—	—	—	—	—	RV	19	15	14	12	13
Coaches	—	—	—	—	—	RV	23	23	18	17	13
Athlon Power Poll	—	—	—	—	—	19	14	12	10	10	14

== Preseason ==
Even with Bobby Petrino as head coach; expectations were low heading into the 2020 season. The Bears were coming off a 1–10 record in 2019. As a result of the COVID-19 pandemic; the Missouri Valley Football Conference season was moved from the Fall to the Spring. Missouri State originally had non-conference games scheduled against Oklahoma, Tarleton State, and Montana. The games against Montana and Tarleton State were canceled. The Bears added a home and home series with Central Arkansas in the Fall. The game at Oklahoma was kept on the schedule as planned.

=== MVFC media poll ===
The media picked the Bears to finish in a tie for ninth place with Western Illinois at the bottom of the MVFC standings. This was the second straight season Missouri State was predicted to finish last in the conference.

=== Preseason awards ===
Missouri State had two players selected to the 2020 All-MVFC Preseason Team. Junior wide receiver Damoriea Vick and Senior cornerback Zack Sanders were the players chosen, both as honorable mentions.

Preseason All-MFVC Team
Player	Team	Position	Year
Damoriea Vick	Honorable-Mention	WR	JR
Zack Sanders	Honorable-Mention	CB	SR

== Game summaries ==
=== Fall ===
==== At No. 5 (FBS) Oklahoma ====
It was all Oklahoma in this one. The Bears were no match for the Sooners for the head coaching debut for Bobby Petrino. Oklahoma used a huge 31–0 first quarter to pull away comfortably. The Bears never really threatened and were shutout in the season opener. RS Freshman QB Jaden Johnson went 9–19 with 72 yards and an interception. WR Lorenzo Thomas had 46 yards on four catches as the leading receiver. RB Tarrell Roberts led Missouri State on the ground with one carry for 26 yards which was nearly half of the 54 rushing yards the Bears tallied up. Meanwhile; for the Sooners Spencer Rattler had four passing TD's in the first half and threw for nearly 300 yards. RB Seth McGowan had 61 yards on nine carries and found the end zone once on a 37-yard pass from Spencer Rattler. WR Theo Howard had 63 yards on five catches.

Game One: Missouri State Bears (0–0) at No. 5 (FBS) Oklahoma Sooners (0–0)

Quarter	1	2	3	4	Total
Missouri State	0	0	0	0	0
No. 5 Oklahoma	31	10	0	7	48

at Gaylord Family Oklahoma Memorial Stadium • Norman, OK

- Date: Saturday, September 12, 2020
- Game time: 6:04 p.m. CDT
- Game weather: HazyTemperature: 78
- Game attendance: 22,700
- Referee: David Alvarez
- TV announcers (FOX PPV): Chad McKee (play-by-play), Chuck Long (analyst) & C.T. Steckel (sideline)

Game information

First Quarter

- (11:24) OKLA – Seth McGowan 1 yard rush, Seth Johnson kick (Drive: 5 plays, 58 yards, 2:13; OU 7–0)
- (09:48) OKLA – Spencer Rattler 58 yard pass to Marvin Mims, Seth Johnson kick (Drive: 1 plays, 58 yards, 0:10; OU 14-0)
- (06:16) OKLA – Spencer Rattler 53 yard pass to Charleston Rambo, Seth Johnson kick (Drive: 5 plays, 65 yards, 2:40; OU 21–0)
- (04:28) OKLA – Spencer Rattler 37 yard pass to Seth McGowan, Seth Johnson kick (Drive: 1 plays, 37 yards, 0:11; OU 28–0)
- (01:22) OKLA – Seth Johnson 42 yard field goal (Drive: 4 plays,3 yards, 1:29; OU 31–0)

Second Quarter

- (11:10) OKLA – Seth Johnson 22 yard field goal (Drive: 7 plays, 51 yards, 3:41; OU 34–0)
- (05:37) OKLA – Spencer Rattler 15 yard pass to Charleston Rambo, Seth Johnson kick (Drive: 6 plays, 52 yards, 3:19; OU 41–0)

Third Quarter

- No Score

Fourth Quarter

- (14:20) OKLA – Tanner Mordecai 16 yard pass to Finn Corwin, Seth Johnson kick (Drive: 3 plays, 21 yards, 1:32; OU 48–0)

Statistics	MSU	OKLA
First downs	7	27
Total yards	135	608
Rushes/yards	24–54	35–124
Passing yards	27–72	102–136
Passing: Comp–Att–Int	10–22-1	30–36–1
Time of possession	22:49	37:11

Team	Category	Player	Statistics
Missouri State	Passing	Jaden Johnson	9/19, 72 yards, 1 INT
Missouri State	Rushing	Tarrel Roberts	1 carries, 26 yards
Missouri State	Receiving	Lorenzo Thomas	4 receptions, 46 yards
Oklahoma	Passing	Spencer Rattler	14/17, 290 yards, 4 TD
Oklahoma	Rushing	Seth McGowan	9 carries, 61 yards, 1 TD
Oklahoma	Receiving	Theo Howard	5 receptions, 63 yards

==== At No. 11 Central Arkansas ====
Missouri State was on the road for the second straight week; this time in Conway, Arkansas taking on the #11 Central Arkansas Bears. The game started slow with neither team scoring in the first quarter. Both teams exchanged turnovers early in the first quarter and Hayden Ray missed a chip shot field goal. The Second quarter was another story as the teams combined for 24 points with the Bears leading 17–7 at half. Kevon Latulas returned a blocked punt for touchdown to give the Bears a 10–0 lead. Kierre Crossley scored from 4 yards out after a Jaden Johnson fumble set the UCA offense up at the MSU 17 yard line. Missouri State opened the second half scoring with a Jose Pizano 31-yard field goal to extend the lead to 20–7 with 8:47 left in the quarter. UCA would strike on a Breylin Smith seven-yard pass to Tyler Hudson; the extra point was missed and MSU led by 7. Central Arkansas grabbed the momentum and control of the game in the early stages of the 4th quarter. QB Jaden Johnson fumbled on the first play of the quarter which was returned by Dre Matthews for a touchdown. The extra point was converted and the game was tied at 20-20. Missouri State had to punt on the next drive after three straight incomplete passes. Grant Burkett booted it 43 yards and was returned 57 yards by Tyler Hudson for Central Arkansas's first lead of the game. Missouri State was never able to score the rest of the quarter and were stopped on 4th down twice in last three minutes of the game. Bobby Petrino would have to wait another week for his first victory.

Game Two: Missouri State Bears (0–1) at No. 11 Central Arkansas Bears (1–1)

Quarter	1	2	3	4	Total
Missouri State	0	17	3	0	20
No. 11 Central Arkansas	0	7	6	14	27

at Estes Stadium • Conway, AR

- Date: Saturday, September 26, 2020
- Game time: 7:05 p.m. CDT
- Game weather: 68 °F (20 °C), Winds SSE 2 mph; Mostly Clear
- Game attendance: 2,000
- Referee: Ed Bourgeois • Umpire: David Williams • Linesman: Tony Wright • Line judge: Todd Allen • Back judge: Brendon Barnes • Field judge: Keith Claiborne • Side judge: Trey Castleberry
- TV announcers (ESPN3): John Liddle, Shea Walker, and Taylor Verrico

Game information

First Quarter

- No score

Second Quarter

- (12:04) MSU – Jose Pizano 47-yard field goal (Drive: 11 plays, 52 yards, 3:32; MSU 0-3)
- (10:45) MSU – Kevon Latulas 16 yard punt block return, Jose Pizano kick (Drive: 3 plays, 7 yards, 1:09; MSU 0–10)
- (07:38) UCA - Kierre Crossley 4 yard run, Hayden Ray kick (Drive: 2 plays, 7 yards, 0:41; MSU 7-10)
- (04:02) MSU - Keshun Parker 3 yard run, Jose Pizano kick (Drive: 10 plays, 65 yards, 3:36; MSU 7-17)

Third Quarter

- (08:49) MSU - Jose Pizano 31 yard field goal (Drive: 8 plays, 59 yards, 3:15; MSU 7-20)
- (01:24) UCA - Tyler Hudson 7 yard pass from Breylin Smith, PAT Failed (Drive: 3 plays, 34 yards, 0:49; MSU 13-20)

Fourth Quarter

- (14:48) MSU - Dre Matthews 30 yard fumble return, Hayden Ray kick (Drive: 4 plays, 23 yards, 1:30; Tied 20-20)
- (14:11) UCA - Tyler Hudson 57 yard punt return, Hayden Ray kick (Drive: 3 plays, 0 yards, 0:31; UCA 27-20)

Statistics	MSU	UCA
First downs	20	10
Total yards	291	177
Rushes/yards	42/42	36/98
Passing yards	249	79
Passing: Comp–Att–Int	25-44-1	9–24–1
Time of possession	34:57	25:03

Team	Category	Player	Statistics
Missouri State	Passing	Jaden Johnson	25/44, 249 yards, 1 INT
Missouri State	Rushing	Kevon Latulas	12 carries, 63 yards
Missouri State	Receiving	Kevon Latulas	6 catches, 83 yards
Central Arkansas	Passing	Breylin Smith	9/24, 79 yards, 1 TD, 1 INT
Central Arkansas	Rushing	Kierre Crossley	13 carries, 48 yards, 1 TD
Central Arkansas	Receiving	Tyler Hudson	4 catches, 62 yards, 1 TD

==== No. 11 Central Arkansas ====
The Bears and Bears met for the second time in the Fall for Missouri State's Homecoming game. This would also be the last game that Missouri State played in the Fall and their last non-conference game. Like the first game, it was a low scoring contest through the first quarter. UCA struck first on a 47-yard field goal from Hayden Ray. This came on the heels of interception from MSU QB Jaden Johnson. Missouri State started the second half strong; scoring 14 straight points on rushing touchdowns by Kevon Latulas for 63 yards and Keshun Parker for one yard. UCA would answer with 14 straight points of their own. Deandre Lamont scored on a 36-yard pick six, and Mitch Perkinson scored on a 10-yard receiving touchdown. Missouri State added 10 more points before the half. Jeremiah Wilson was the third MSU running back to hit paydirt when he scored from nine yards out. Jose Pizano kicked a 30-yard field goal as time expired to put Missouri State up 24–17 at the half. UCA scored 16 unanswered points in the third quarter on three field goals from Hayden Ray and Breylin Smith's second touchdown pass of the game. Backup QB Jake Van Dyne threw two interceptions to stunt the offense for MSU. Missouri State would finish the fall winless at 0–3. Missouri State continued to turn the ball over with two fumbles lost and 4 interceptions.

Game Three: Missouri State Bears (0–2) vs. #11 Central Arkansas Bears (2–1)

Quarter	1	2	3	4	Total
No. 11 Central Arkansas	3	14	16	0	33
Missouri State	0	24	0	0	24

at Plaster Stadium • Springfield, MO

- Date: Saturday, October 17, 2020
- Game time: 7:05 p.m. CDT
- Game weather: 65 °F (18 °C), Winds SSE 15 mph; Clear
- Game attendance: 5,489
- Referee: Andy Speciale • Umpire: Scott Jones • Linesman: Chris Hamilton • Line judge: Jeff Engelmann • Back judge: Cleo Miller • Field judge: Travis Evans • Side judge: Austin Hills
- TV announcers (ESPN3): Don West, Corey Riggs

Game information

First Quarter

- (12:26) UCA - Hayden Ray 47 yard field goal (Drive: 5 plays, 13 yards, 1:46; UCA 0-3)

Second Quarter

- (14:56) MSU - Keshun Parker 1 yard run, Jose Pizano kick (Drive: 6 plays, 80 yards, 1:53; MSU 7-3)
- (13:10) MSU - Kevon Latulas 63 yard run, Jose Pizano kick (Drive: 1 play, 63 yards, 0:13; MSU 14-3)
- (11:24) UCA - Deandre Lamont 35 yard interception return, Hayden Ray kick (Drive: 1 play, 35 yards, 0:08; MSU 14-10)
- (09:23) UCA - Mitch Perkinson 10 yard pass from Breylin Smith, Hayden Ray kick (Drive: 5 plays, 26 yards, 1:49; UCA 14-17)
- (04:13) MSU - Jeremiah Wilson 9 yard run, Jose Pizano kick (Drive: 11 plays, 83 yards, 5:06; MSU 21-17)
- (00:00) MSU - Jose Pizano 30 yard field goal (Drive: 8 plays, 39 yards, 2:38; MSU 24-17)

Third Quarter

- (11:52) UCA - Hayden Ray 46 yard field goal (Drive: 8 plays, 32 yards, 3:01; MSU 24-20)
- (07:25) UCA - Hayden Ray 43 yard field goal (Drive: 10 plays, 28 yards, 3:08; MSU 24-23)
- (04:13) UCA - Hayden Ray 23 yard field goal (Drive: 4 plays, 3 yards, 1:10; UCA 24-26)
- (00:59) UCA - Tyler Hudson 42 yard pass from Breylin Smith, Hayden Ray kick (Drive: 2 plays, 43 yards, 0:56; UCA 24-33)

Fourth Quarter

- No score

Statistics	MSU	UCA
First downs	16	17
Total yards	330	268
Rushes/yards	41/176	37/93
Passing yards	175	154
Passing: Comp–Att–Int	18-36-0	12–29–4
Time of possession	31:14	28:47

Team	Category	Player	Statistics
Missouri State	Passing	Jake Van Dyne	7/13, 92 yards, 2 INT
Missouri State	Rushing	Jeremiah Wilson	13 carries, 101 yards, 1 TD
Missouri State	Receiving	Damoriea Vick	3 catches, 50 yards
Central Arkansas	Passing	Breylin Smith	18/36, 175 yards, 2 TD
Central Arkansas	Rushing	Kierre Crossley	18 carries, 78 yards
Central Arkansas	Receiving	Tyler Hudson	4 catches, 69 yards, 1 TD

=== Spring ===
==== At Western Illinois ====
The Bears traveled to Hanson Field in Macomb, Illinois for their first game of the Spring and first MVFC matchup. Missouri State jumped out to a 14-point lead in the first quarter from a five-yard rushing touchdown from Celdon Manning and 11-yard run from Jeremiah Wilson. This was the first time all season that the Bears scored in the first quarter. They had been shutout in their previous three games. The Leathernecks dominated the second quarter; scoring 17 points to take a 17–14 lead into the half. Western Illinois took advantage of three turnovers by the Bears. Dennis Houston scored on six-yard pass from Connor Sampson after Jaden Johnson his first interception of the game. Greg Benton Jr. returned a Jaden Johnson fumble 75 yards to tie the game at 14. Another Bears drive stalled in Leatherneck territory when Jaden Johnson threw his second interception. WIU would use the possession to go up by three points as time expired when Mason Laramie connected from 45 yards out. The Bears returned the favor in the third with a 37-yard field goal from Jose Pizano. Pizano would another field goal in the 4th to give the Bears their first lead of the game since 6:50 in the second quarter. The Leathernecks retook the lead for the last when Tony Tate scored on the ground from two yards out. Jaden Johnson threw his first touchdown pass as a Bear when he connected with Isaac Smith for a 22-yard score. Jose Pizano kicked his third field goal of the game to put the Bears up 30–24 when he converted from 33 yards. Missouri State held on for the first win of the Bobby Petrino era.

Game Four: Missouri State Bears (0–3) at Western Illinois Leathernecks (0-0)

Quarter	1	2	3	4	Total
Missouri State	14	0	3	13	30
Western Illinois	0	17	0	7	24

at Hanson Field • Macomb, IL

- Date: Saturday, February 27, 2021
- Game time: 12:05 p.m. CDT
- Game weather: 56 °F (13 °C), Winds S 5 mph; Sunny
- Game attendance: 421
- Referee: Matt Gallagher • Umpire: Kyle Harbour • Linesman: Scott Landy • Line judge: Ivan Cardonan • Back judge: Bill Foltz • Field judge: Jared Budson • Side judge: Stacy Jameson
- TV: ESPN+

Game information

First Quarter

- (04:54) MSU - Celdon Manning 5 yard run, Jose Pizano kick (Drive: 7 plays, 79 yards, 3:40; MSU 0-7)
- (00:10) MSU - Jeremiah Wilson 11 yard run, Jose Pizano kick (Drive: 8 plays, 68 yards, 3:31; MSU 0-14)

Second Quarter

- (10:53) WIU - Dennis Houston 6 yard pass from Connor Sampson, Mason Laramie kick (Drive: 5 plays, 25 yards, 2:11; MSU 7-14)
- (06:50) WIU - Greg Benton Jr. 75 yard fumble recovery, Mason Laramie kick (TIED 14-14)
- (00:00) WIU - Mason Laramie 45 yard field goal (Drive: 7 plays, 42 yards, 0:51; WIU 17-14)

Third Quarter

- (10:14) MSU - Jose Pizano 37 yard field goal (Drive: 9 plays, 58 yards, 4:41; TIED 17-17)

Fourth Quarter

- (13:28) MSU - Jose Pizano 43 yard field goal ( Drive: 5 plays, 16 yards, 1:21; MSU 17-20)
- (07:56) WIU - Tony Tate 2 yard run, Mason Laramie kick (Drive: 15 plays, 89 yards, 5:32; WIU 24-20)
- (06:39) MSU - Isaac Smith 22 yard pass from Jaden Johnson, Jose Pizano kick (Drive: 3 plays, 92 yards, 1:15; MSU 24-27)
- (03:48) MSU - Jose Pizano 33 yard field goal (Drive: 4 plays, 4 yards, 1:35; MSU 24-30)

Statistics	MSU	WIU
First downs	21	17
Total yards	433	329
Rushes/yards	45/155	30/48
Passing yards	278	281
Passing: Comp–Att–Int	18-28-2	34–46–2
Time of possession	34:21	25:39

Team	Category	Player	Statistics
Missouri State	Passing	Jaden Johnson	18/28, 278 yards, 1 TD, 2 INT
Missouri State	Rushing	Celdon Manning	16 carries, 69 yards, 1 TD
Missouri State	Receiving	Damoriea Vick	6 catches, 138 yards
Western Illinois	Passing	Connor Sampson	34/46, 281 yards, 1 TD, 2 INT
Western Illinois	Rushing	Gavin DeShon	6 carries, 22 yards
Western Illinois	Receiving	Dennis Houston	9 catches, 71 yards, 1 TD

==== No. 6 North Dakota State ====
The Bears returned home following the win at Western Illinois for a matchup with the #6 North Dakota State Bison. The Bears couldn't get anything going offensively and were unable to crack the Bison Defense. 25 first half points were enough for NDSU to win the game. Bison QB Zeb Noland Threw a seven-yard touchdown pass to Noah Grindorff to put the Bison up seven points. The Bears defense allowed two big plays to hand North Dakota State control. Jalen Bussey scored on a 53-yard touchdown run while Zeb Noland threw his second touchdown pass of the game when he connected with Braylon Henderson for an 81-yard score with less than 10 seconds left in the half. Jake Reinholz added a 38-yard field goal in between the long Bison scores. Jose Pizano had a 42-yard field goal blocked in the second quarter. The Bears would drop to 1–4 on the season and extend their losing streak to the Bison to 10 years.

Game Five: Missouri State Bears (1–3) vs. #6 North Dakota State Bison (2–1)

Quarter	1	2	3	4	Total
No. 6 North Dakota State	7	18	0	0	25
Missouri State	0	0	0	0	0

at Plaster Stadium • Springfield, MO

- Date: Saturday, March 6, 2021
- Game time: 2:05 p.m. CDT
- Game weather: 58 °F (14 °C), Winds WSW 3 mph; Sunny
- Game attendance: 3,147
- Referee: Aaron Adams • Umpire: Dan Montgomery • Linesman: Gordy Hanson • Line Judge: Marc Shield • Back Judge: Jamie Birr • Field Judge: Dorran Stewart • Side Judge: Sam Banks
- TV announcers (ESPN+): Don West, Corey Riggs

Game information

First Quarter

- (01:49) NDSU - Noah Gindorff 7 yard pass from Zeb Noland, Jake Reinholz kick (Drive: 12 plays, 71 yards, 5:54; NDSU 0-7)

Second Quarter

- (06:24) NDSU - Jalen Bussey 53 yard run, James Kaczor rush (Drive: 4 plays, 65 yards, 1:53; NDSU 0-15)
- (01:25) NDSU - Jake Reinholz 38 yard field goal (Drive: 7 plays, 44 yards, 3:30; NDSU 0-18)
- (00:08) NDSU - Braylon Henderson 81 yard pass from Zeb Noland, Jake Reinholz kick (Drive: 2 plays, 81 yards, 0:17; NDSU 0-25)

Third Quarter

- No Score

Fourth Quarter

- No Score

Statistics	NDSU	MSU
First downs	15	14
Total yards	407	221
Rushes/yards	48/272	34/63
Passing yards	135	158
Passing: Comp–Att–Int	10-15-1	16–29–0
Time of possession	33:56	26:04

Team	Category	Player	Statistics
North Dakota State	Passing	Zeb Noland	10/15, 135 yards, 2 TD, 1 INT
North Dakota State	Rushing	Jalen Bussey	10 carries, 98 yards
North Dakota State	Receiving	Braylon Henderson	1 catch, 81 yards, 1 TD
Missouri State	Passing	Jaden Johnson	13/21, 132 yards
Missouri State	Rushing	Tobias Little	8 carries, 46 yards
Missouri State	Receiving	Damoriea Vick	6 catches, 73 yards

==== At No. 21 South Dakota ====
Missouri State traveled North to the Dakota Dome to visit the #21 South Dakota Coyotes. The Coyotes struck first in the 1st quarter when Kai Henry scored on the ground from eight yards away. The Bears answered immediately when Montrae Braswell returned the ensuing kickoff 100 yards for a touchdown. The first kick return for a touchdown in two years for the Bears. South Dakota scored again on the ground when Travis Theis scored on a 31-yard run. Missouri State fought back in the second quarter with Jose Pizano kicking a 21-yard field goal. Montrae Braswell added his second touchdown of the game when he picked off South Dakota QB Carson Camp and broke numerous tackles en route to a 36-yard pick six. The Coyotes tied the game up at 27 when Mason Lorber knocked through a 21-yard field goal. It stayed tied through the half and most of the 3rd till South Dakota added seven more on a Carson Camp 36-yard touchdown pass to Carter Bell. The Bears would tie the game up on their next drive. Jeremiah Wilson capped off an 11 play, 75-yard drive when he scored on a six-yard run. The Bears special teams came up big in the 4th quarter. Eric Johnson blocked a 44-yard field goal attempt by Mason Lorber to preserve the tie. On the next drive; Jose Pizano put the Bears up for good 27–24 after he converted a 28-yard field goal. The Bears defense sacked Carson Camp six times in the game. Bobby Petrino got his first win vs. a ranked opponent, and the Bears won their first game in the Dakota Dome after losing their previous three games there.

Game Six: Missouri State Bears (1–4) at No. 21 South Dakota Coyotes (1–1)

Quarter	1	2	3	4	Total
Missouri State	7	10	7	3	27
No. 21 South Dakota	14	3	7	0	24

at Dakota Dome • Vermillion, SD

- Date: Saturday, March 13, 2021
- Game time: 1:05 p.m. CDT
- Game weather: 72 °F (22 °C), Winds none; Indoor
- Game attendance: 2,051
- Referee: Rick Warne • Umpire: Keith Vaverchak • Linesman: Frank Spryszak • Line judge: Marcus Allen• Back judge: Devin Aller • Field judge: Paul Winglewich • Side judge: Ken Cloud
- TV announcers (ESPN+): Jay Elsen, Andre Fields

Game information

First Quarter

- (02:32) USD - Kai Henry 8 yard run, Mason Lorber kick (Drive: 6 plays, 40 yards, 1:51; USD 7-0)
- (02:21) MSU - Montrae Braswell 100 yard kickoff return, Jose Pizano kick (TIED 7-7)
- (00:50) USD - Travis Theis 31 yard run, Mason Lorber kick (Drive: 4 plays, 75 yards, 1:31; USD 14-7)

Second Quarter

- (09:51) MSU - Jose Pizano 21 yard field goal (Drive: 14 plays, 80 yards, 5:53; USD 14-10)
- (08:55) MSU - Montrae Braswell 36 yard interception return, Jose Pizano kick ( MSU 14-17)
- (04:33) USD - Mason Lorber 21 yard field goal (Drive: 11 plays, 83 yards, 4:22; TIED 17-17)

Third Quarter

- (07:48) USD - Carter Bell 36 yard pass from Carson Camp, Mason Lorber kick (Drive: 4 plays, 82 yards, 1:03; USD24-17)
- (03:41) MSU - Jeremiah Wilson 6 yard run, Jose Pizano kick (Drive: 11 plays, 75 yards, 4:07; TIED 24-24)

Fourth Quarter

- (07:51) MSU - Jose Pizano 28 yard field goal (Drive: 9 plays, 42 yards, 4:44; MSU 24-27)

Statistics	MSU	USD
First downs	18	26
Total yards	325	440
Rushes/yards	40/158	39/101
Passing yards	167	339
Passing: Comp–Att–Int	18-28-0	22–34–1
Time of possession	31:51	28:09

Team	Category	Player	Statistics
Missouri State	Passing	Jaden Johnson	16/25, 136 yards
Missouri State	Rushing	Jeremiah Wilson	14 carries, 62 yards, 1 TD
Missouri State	Receiving	Damoriea Vick	4 catches, 68 yards
South Dakota	Passing	Carson Camp	22/34, 339 yards, 1 TD, 1 INT
South Dakota	Rushing	Kai Henry	23 carries, 86 yards, 1 TD
South Dakota	Receiving	Carter Bell	6 catches, 106 yards, 1 TD

==== At No. 10 Northern Iowa ====
Game Six: Missouri State Bears (2–4) at No. 10 Northern Iowa Panthers (2–2)

Quarter	1	2	3	4	Total
Missouri State	7	3	0	3	13
No. 10 Northern Iowa	0	3	3	0	6

at UNI Dome • Cedar Falls, IA

- Date: Saturday, March 20, 2021
- Game time: 4:07 p.m. CDT
- Game weather: 74 °F (23 °C), Winds none; Indoor
- Game attendance: 1,608
- Referee: Matt Gallagher • Umpire: Scott Landry • Linesman: Ivan Cardona • Line judge: Chuck Morning • Back judge: Stacy Jameson • Field judge: Amy Pistone • Side judge: Scott Landry
- TV announcers (ESPN+): Brad Wells, Justin Surrency

Game information

First Quarter

- (02:32) MSU - Carson Buddemeyer 3 yard pass from Matt Struck, Jose Pizano kick (Drive: 13 plays, 91 yards, 6:47; MSU 0-7)

Second Quarter

- (01:24) MSU - Jose Pizano 31 yard field goal (Drive: 4 plays, 8 yards, 2:06; MSU 0-10)
- (00:00) UNI - Matthew Cook 27 yard field goal (Drive: 11 plays, 65 yards, 1:24; MSU 3-10)

Third Quarter

- (00:55) UNI - Matthew Cook 43 yard field goal (Drive: 6 plays, 25 yards, 3:14; MSU 6-10)

Fourth Quarter

- (04:30) MSU - Jose Pizano 33 yard field goal (Drive: 12 plays, 55 yards, 6:09; MSU 6-13)

Statistics	MSU	UNI
First downs	14	11
Total yards	236	242
Rushes/yards	36/62	26/27
Passing yards	174	215
Passing: Comp–Att–Int	19-25-1	18–30–1
Time of possession	31:09	28:51

Team	Category	Player	Statistics
Missouri State	Passing	Matt Struck	19/ 25, 174 yards, 1 TD, 1 INT
Missouri State	Rushing	Tobias Little	12 carries, 41 yards
Missouri State	Receiving	Damoriea Vick	6 catches, 67 yards
Northern Iowa	Passing	Justin Fomby	18/ 29, 215 yards, 1 INT
Northern Iowa	Rushing	Dom Williams	10 carries, 43 yards,
Northern Iowa	Receiving	Logan Wolf	3 catches, 52 yards

==== No. 10 Southern Illinois ====
Game Five: Missouri State Bears (3–4) vs. #10 Southern Illinois Salukis (4-2)

Quarter	1	2	3	4	Total
No. 10 Southern Illinois	2	17	0	8	27
Missouri State	7	0	7	16	30

at Plaster Stadium • Springfield, MO

- Date: Saturday, March 27, 2021
- Game time: 2:05 p.m. CDT
- Game weather: 77 °F (25 °C), Winds SW 16 mph; Sunny
- Game attendance: 3,581
- Referee: Rick Warne • Umpire: Adam McClurg • Linesman: Frank Bullock • Line Judge: Bret Carpenter • Back Judge: Chris Curry • Field Judge: Chuck Morning • Side Judge: Pat Brown II
- TV announcers (ESPN+): Don West, Corey Riggs

Game information

First Quarter

- (14:49) MSU - Celdon Manning 75 yard pass from Matt Struck, Jose Pizano kick (Drive: 1 play, 75 yards, 0:11; MSU 7-0)
- (02:41) SIU - TEAM 1 yard safety (MSU 7-2)

Second Quarter

- (13:37) SIU - Branson Combs 29 yard pass from Javon Williams Jr., Nico Gualdoni kick (Drive: 10 plays, 61 yards, 3:56; SIU 7-9)
- (10:23) SIU - Justin Strong 28 yard pass from Stone Labanowitz Nico Gualdoni kick (Drive: 3 plays, 39 yards, 1:25; SIU 7-16)
- (00:00) SIU - Nico Gualdoni 23 yard field goal (Drive: 5 plays, 25 yards, 0:30; SIU 7-19)

Third Quarter

- (05:25) MSU - Celdon Manning 2 yard run, Jose Pizano kick (Drive: 11 plays, 80 yards, 4:49; SIU 14-19)

Fourth Quarter

- (07:13) MSU - Celdon Manning 3 yard run, Matt Struck pass failed (Drive: 5 plays, 51 yards, 2:15; MSU 20-19)
- (05:34) SIU - Avante Cox 7 yard pass from Stone Labanowitz, Stone Labanowitz pass (Drive: 5 plays, 75 yards, 1:39; SIU 20-27)
- (02:42) MSU - Celdon Manning 23 yard run, Jose Pizano kick (Drive: 6 plays, 75 yards, 2:48; TIED 27-27)
- (00:00) MSU - Jose Pizano 33 yard field goal (Drive: 6 plays, 50 yards, 1:42; MSU 30-27)

Statistics	SIU	MSU
First downs	20	18
Total yards	431	377
Rushes/yards	38/120	33/132
Passing yards	311	245
Passing: Comp–Att–Int	27-38-1	18–30–0
Time of possession	33:16	26:44

Team	Category	Player	Statistics
Southern Illinois	Passing	Stone Labanowitz	25/34, 270 yards, 2 TD
Southern Illinois	Rushing	Romeir Elliott	13 carries, 42 yards
Southern Illinois	Receiving	Justin Strong	9 catches, 96 yards, 1 TD
Missouri State	Passing	Matt Struck	18/26, 245 yards, 1 TD
Missouri State	Rushing	Tobias Little	16 carries, 71 yards
Missouri State	Receiving	Celdon Manning	6 catches, 117 yards, 1 TD

==== Youngstown State ====
Game Five: #15 Missouri State Bears (4–4) vs. Youngstown State Penguins (1-5)

Quarter	1	2	3	4	Total
Youngstown State	0	3	0	7	10
No. 15 Missouri State	0	7	14	0	21

at Plaster Stadium • Springfield, MO

- Date: Saturday, April 10, 2021
- Game time: 2:05 p.m. CDT
- Game weather: 50 °F (10 °C), Winds W 19 mph; Light Rain
- Game attendance: 3,581
- Referee: Aaron Adams • Umpire: Dan Montgomery • Linesman: Denis Schinderl • Line Judge: Marc Shield • Back Judge: Jamie Birr • Field Judge: Dorran Stewart • Side Judge: Leanne Surmin
- TV announcers (ESPN+): Don West, Corey Riggs

Game information

First Quarter

- No Score

Second Quarter

- (08:21) YSU - Colt McFadden 38 yard field goal (Drive: 14 plays, 45 yards, 7:40; YSU 0-3)
- (01:43) MSU - Jeremiah Wilson 2 yard run, Jose Pizano kick (Drive: 15 plays, 85 yards, 6:33; MSU 7-3)

Third Quarter

- (08:48) MSU - Damoriea Vick 8 yard pass from Jaden Johnson, Jose Pizano kick (Drive: 13 plays, 44 yards, 6:03; MSU 14-3)
- (01:32) MSU - Damoriea Vick 31 yard pass from Jaden Johnson, Jose Pizano kick (Drive: 5 plays, 61 yards, 2:27; MSU 21-3)

Fourth Quarter

- (08:40) YSU - Dra Rusthon 6 yard pass from Joe Craycraft, Colt McFadden kick (Drive: 5 plays, 58 yards, 2:30; MSU 21-10)

Statistics	YSU	MSU
First downs	15	17
Total yards	267	268
Rushes/yards	39/167	47/186
Passing yards	100	82
Passing: Comp–Att–Int	10-24-0	7–18–0
Time of possession	30:15	29:45

Team	Category	Player	Statistics
Youngstown State	Passing	Joe Craycraft	10/24, 100 yards, 1 TD
Youngstown State	Rushing	Jaleel McLaughlin	20 carries, 100 yards
Youngstown State	Receiving	CJ Charleston	2 catches, 45 yards
Missouri State	Passing	Jaden Johnson	6/12, 73 yards, 2 TD
Missouri State	Rushing	Celdon Manning	22 carries, 99 yards
Missouri State	Receiving	Damoriea Vick	5 catches, 59 yards, 2 TD

==== At No. 7 North Dakota—NCAA Division I First Round ====
Game Five: #12 Missouri State Bears (5–4) vs. #7 North Dakota Fighting Hawks (4-1)

Quarter	1	2	3	4	Total
No. 12 Missouri State	3	0	0	7	10
No. 7 North Dakota	14	10	13	7	44

at Alerus Center • Grand Forks, ND

- Date: Saturday, April 24, 2021
- Game time: 3:00 p.m. CDT
- Game weather: 70 °F (21 °C), Winds none, Indoor
- Game attendance: 3,074
- Referee: Steve Cadorette • Umpire: Corey Williams • Linesman: Mark Tarleton • Line Judge: Robert Shober • Back Judge: J. Moscarello • Field Judge: Martine Jones • Side Judge: Tim Gallagher
- TV announcers (ESPN3): Matt Stewart, Eric MacLain

Game information

First Quarter

- (12:40) UND - Garett Maag 50 yard pass from Tommy Schuster, Adam Stage kick (Drive: 4 plays, 62 yards, 1:48; UND 7-0)
- (08:00) UND - Bo Belquist 48 yard pass from Tommy Schuster, Adam Stage kick (Drive: 5 plays, 73 yards, 2:38; UND 14-0)
- (03:18) MSU - Jose Pizano 28 yard field goal (Drive: 9 plays, 53 yards, 4:34; UND 14-3)

Second Quarter

- (14:22) UND - Adam Stage 31 yard field goal (Drive: 8 plays, 46 yards, 3:50; UND 17-3)
- (09:55) UND - Otis Weah 6 yard run, Adam Stage kick (Drive: 5 plays, 35 yards, 2:49; UND 24-3)

Third Quarter

- (09:21) UND - Hayden Reynolds 15 yard blocked punt return, Adam Stage kick (UND 31-3)
- (06:31) UND - Hayden Galvin 90 yard interception, Adam Stage kick failed (UND 37-3)

Fourth Quarter

- (12:20) MSU - Jaden Johnson 8 yard run, Jose Pizano kick (Drive: 10 plays, 46 yards, 2:45; UND 37-10)
- (02:17) UND - C. Mitchell 19 yard run, Adam Stage kick (Drive: 5 plays, 59 yards, 2:45; UND 44-10)

Statistics	MSU	UND
First downs	11	17
Total yards	185	364
Rushes/yards	35/88	38/141
Passing yards	97	223
Passing: Comp–Att–Int	12-31-1	13–18–0
Time of possession	29:05	30:55

Team	Category	Player	Statistics
Missouri State	Passing	Matt Struck	8/15, 71 yards, 1 INT
Missouri State	Rushing	Tobias Little	11 carries, 50 yards
Missouri State	Receiving	Damoriea Vick	5 catches, 52 yards
North Dakota	Passing	Tommy Schuster	13/18, 223 yards 2 TD
North Dakota	Rushing	Otis Weah	13 carries, 64 yards, 1 TD
North Dakota	Receiving	Bo Belquist	4 catches, 88 yards, 1 TD

== Awards and honors ==
=== Regular season ===
==== Missouri Valley Football Conference ====
Defensive Player of the Week
Player	Position	Date	Ref.
Kevin Ellis	DE	February 28, 2021	
Montrae Brasswell	DB	March 14, 2021	
Tylar Wiltz	LB	April 11, 2021	

Newcomer of the Week
Player	Position	Date	Ref.
Matt Struck	QB	March 28, 2021	

Offensive Player of the Week
Player	Position	Date	Ref.
Celdon Manning	RB	March 28, 2021	

Offensive Lineman of the Week
Player	Position	Date	Ref.
Ian Fitzgerald	OT	March 29, 2021	

Special Teams Player of the Week
Player	Position	Date	Ref.
Jose Pizano	K	March 21, 2021	

==== STATS ====
National Freshman of the Week
Player	Position	Date	Ref.
Celdon Manning	RB	March 30, 2021	

=== Postseason ===
==== MFVC ====
Regular-Season All-MFVC Team
Player	Team	Position	Year
Montrae Braswell	First Team	CB	SO
Landon Beebee	Second Team	OL	SO
Kevin Ellis	Second Team	DE	JR
Eric Johnson	Second Team	DL	SR
Kyriq McDonald	Second Team	DB	SR
Jose Pizano	Second Team	K	SO
Tylar Wiltz	Second Team	LB	JR
Grant Burkett	Honorable-Mention	P	Rs-FR
Celdon Manning	Honorable-Mention	RB	FR
Damoriea Vick	Honorable-Mention	WR	JR

MVFC Coach of the Year
Coach
Bobby Petrino

== Personnel ==
=== Coaching staff ===
The coaching staff for the Bears was completed overhauled following the hire of Bobby Petrino. Director of football operations Lynn Mentzer was the only person retained from the Dave Steckel era. Former Central Michigan special teams and safeties coach Ryan Beard, joined the Bears as the defensive coordinator. Nick Petrino joined the Bears as the offensive coordinator/ quarterbacks coach after spending the previous season at UT Martin in the same capacity.

Name	Position	Alma mater	Joined staff
Bobby Petrino	Head coach	Carroll College (1983)	2020
Ryan Beard	Defensive coordinator/ Safeties	Western Kentucky (2012)	2020
Nick Petrino	Offense coordinator / quarterbacks coach	Western Kentucky (2014)	2020
Austin Appleby	Wide receivers coach	Purdue (2015)	2020
Skyler Cassity	Inside linebackers coach	Auburn (2016)	2020
Nelson Fishback	Tight ends coach/ co-special teams coordinator	Western Kentucky (2015)	2020
Ronnie Fouch	Runningbacks Coach/ recruiting coordinator/ co-special teams coordinator	Indiana State (2004)	2020
Max Helpin	Offensive line coach	Western Kentucky (2016)	2020
Reggie Johnson	Inside Linebackers	Louisville (1996)	2020
L.D. Scott	Defensive line coach/ run game coordinator	Louisville (2009)	2020
Tramain Thomas	Defensive backs coach	Arkansas (2013)	2020
Lynn Mentzer	Director of football operations	Coastal Carolina (2005)	2018

=== Roster ===
2020 Missouri State Bears Football Roster
Quarterback: 1 Matt Struck – senior (6'4, 220); 7 Darrias Pearsall – freshman (6'2, 205); 8 Jaden Johnson – (redshirt) Freshman (6'2, 216); 10 Jake Van Dyne – freshman (6'3, 193); 17 Reece Dawson – freshman (6'4, 218); Running back: 5 Jeremiah Wilson – (redshirt) sophomore (6'1, 216); 13 Tobias Little – senior (6'0, 237); 14 Myron Mason – junior (5'8, 200); 20 Kellen Porter – freshman (5'10, 211); 21 Myles Shaw – freshman (5'9, 180); 25 D.J. Frost – sophomore (6'1, 202); 27 Tra'Keci Cooper – freshman (5'11, 185); 28 Kevon Latulas – junior (6'0, 200); 31 Celdon Manning – freshman (5'10, 180); 32 Brandon Benjamin – freshman (5'9, 200); Wide receiver: 4 Lorenzo Thomas – senior (6'5 200); 6 Cairo Payne – freshman (5'11, 178); 16 Damoriea Vick – junior (6'3, 213); 18 Ethan Swanegan – sophomore (6'5, 213); 24 Payton Lusk – freshman (6'3, 182); 80 Isaiah Allred – junior (6'3, 214); 81 Jakael Jackson – freshman (6'1, 175); 83 Jaron Burks – sophomore (6'3, 192); 84 DVontae Key – freshman (5'10, 175); 88 Hunter Wood – freshman (6'1, 205); Tight end: 2 Ron Tiavaasue – junior (6'3, 250); 9 Jordan Murray – junior (6'4, 233); 11 Armand Baker – junior (6'4, 247); 49 Carson Buddemeyer – (redshirt) freshman (6'2, 246); 86 Sloan Hayden – freshman (6'5, 240); 89 Isaac Smith – senior (6'7, 250)'; Punter: 31 Grant Burkett – (redshirt) freshman (6'1, 181)	Offensive lineman: 50 Paul Sogialofa – junior (6'5, 325); 55 Andrew Colvin – senior (6'3, 310); 56 Ryan Suliafu – sophomore (6'2, 340); 60 Sean Fitzgerald – senior (6'2, 295); 62 Ethan Barnett – (redshirt) freshman (6'7, 301); 63 Jake Seidel – freshman (6'5, 296); 64 Nick Gallo – freshman (6'5, 295); 65 Ian Fitzgerald – sophomore (6'5, 284); 66 Grant Goodson – freshman (6'6, 290); 67 Remy Bilodeau – sophomore (6'3, 285); 68 Baylor Christy – (redshirt) freshman (6'7, 305); 69 Nick Nielsen – (redshirt) freshman (6'5, 300); 71 Arin Reynolds – senior (6'4, 315); 72 Mark Hutchinson – freshman (6'2, 300); 73 Landon Bebee – sophomore (6'3, 291); 74 Mike Fangman – freshman (6'2, 295); 76 Jake Swope – (redshirt) freshman (6'7, 290); 77 Kobe Brandt – sophomore (6'6, 315); 79 Daniel Allen – senior (6'5, 300); Defensive lineman: 2 Isaiah Sayles – DE – junior (6'3, 238); 15 Kevin Ellis – DE – junior (6'4, 241); 33 Anthony Payne – DE – junior (6'2, 274); 47 Devin Goree – DE – freshman (6'3, 251); 90 Jimmy Williams – DE – sophomore (6'2, 272); 91 Ja'Veo Toliver – DE – freshman (6'5, 245); 92 Godey Coleus – DL – senior (6'2, 283); 93 Eric Johnson – DL – senior (6'5, 286); 94 I.K. Ahumibe – DT – junior (6'0, 295); 95 Jalen Williams – DE – (redshirt) freshman (6'4, 240); 96 Armon Wallace – DL – freshman (6'0, 289); 97 Michael Pope – DE – (redshirt) freshman (6'3, 250); 98 Arian Bhat – DL – sophomore (6'2, 285); 99 Charles Johnson – DL – junior (6'2, 330); Long snapper: 61 Caden Bolz – (redshirt) freshman (6'0, 240)	Linebacker: 5 Ferrin Manuleleua – junior (6'1, 225); 7 Titus Wall – senior (6'0, 203); 9 Mikey Miles – freshman (6'2, 218); 10 Tylar Wiltz – junior (6'1, 230); 44 Keshun Parker – sophomore (5'11, 235); 46 Ethan Mackowski – (redshirt) freshman (6'3, 225); 48 Tyler Lovelace – senior (6'2, 213); 52 Bryan Ulrich – freshman (6'0, 231); 54 Von Young – (redshirt) freshman (6'0, 226); 57 C.J. Garnett – freshman (6'0, 217); 58 Logan Decker – sophomore (6'1, 225); 59 Lucas Eastman – (redshirt) freshman (6'3, 230); Cornerback: 0 Kaunor Ashley – freshman (5'10, 186); 1 Zack Sanders – senior (6'0, 190); 4 Montrae Braswell – sophomore (6'0, 185); 8 Jeremy Webb – senior (6'4, 205); 17 Nick Hessefort – sophomore (6'2, 200); 22 Chanlor Johnson – freshman (6'2, 207); 26 Tahj Chambers – freshman (6'2, 200); 34 Kelvyn Mason – (redshirt) freshman (6'0, 184); 36 Marquis Yarbrough – junior (5'11, 180); Defensive back: 6 Kyriq McDonald – sophomore (6'0, 202); 41 Cole Bowen – freshman (5'10, 160); Safety: 19 Greg Washington – (redshirt) freshman (6'0, 190); 23 Breon Dixon – junior (6'0, 212); 29 Dwight Jacobs Jr. – freshman (5'10, 194); 26 P.J. Hall – freshman (6'3, 184); 39 Brock Carter – sophomore (5'11, 192); Placekicker: 37 Spencer Grosz – (redshirt) freshman (5'11, 165); 38 Jose Pizano – sophomore (5'7, 221); 42 Logan Brock – (redshirt) freshman (6'1, 210)

=== Transfers ===
==== Incoming ====
Name	No.	Pos.	Height	Weight	Year	Hometown	Prev. school
Breon Dixon	#23	S	6'0	212	Junior	Loganville, Georgia	Iowa Western
I.k. Ahumibe	#94	DT	6'0	295	Junior	Cerritos, California	Cerritos
Keshun Parker	#44	LB	5'11	235	Junior	Calhoun City, Mississippi	Itawamba
Kyriq McDonald	#6	DB	6'0	202	Sophomore	Madison, Alabama	Cincinnati
Jaden Johnson	#8	QB	6'2	216	RS Freshman	Memphis, Tennessee	Southern Miss
Jeremy Webb	#8	CB	6'4	205	RS Senior	Mims, Florida	Virginia Tech
Jimmy Williams	#90	DE	6'2	272	Sophomore	Raytown, Missouri	Missouri Valley
Jose Pizano	#38	K	5'7	221	Sophomore	Lehi, Utah	Snow
Matt Struck•	#1	QB	6'4	220	Senior	Central Point, Oregon	Idaho State
Montrae Brasswell•	#4	CB	6'0	185	Sophomore	Avon Park, Florida	Central Michigan
Tobias Little•	#13	RB	6'0	237	Senior	Atlanta, Georgia	Louisville

Note: • Transferred in Spring, immediately eligible for Spring season.

==== Outgoing ====
Name	No.	Pos.	Height	Weight	Year	Hometown	School Transferred to
Jaden Abdallah	26	RB	6'0	216	Freshman	The Colony, Texas	None
Chase Hutchison	60	OL	6'3	308	RS Freshman	Raymore, Missouri	None
Ian Fox	74	OL	6'4	263	RS Sophomore	Phoenix, Arizona	None
Zane Hekking	75	OL	6'5	301	Sophomore	Chandler, Arizona	Valdosta State
Casey O'Brien	70	OL	6'5	291	Junior	Lemont, Illinois	None
Will Taylor	90	DE	6'3	274	RS Freshman	Oklahoma City, Oklahoma	None
Edd Becton	91	DT	5'11	276	Sophomore	Florissant, Missouri	None
Claudio Martin	57	DT	6'2	286	RS Junior	Overland Park, Kansas	None
Levi Marshall	45	LB	6'1	217	Freshman	Apollo Beach, Florida	Coffeyville
Jordan Wilkes	23	MLB	6'0	231	Junior	Florissant, Missouri	None
Rusty Rudd	46	CB	6'2	175	Freshman	Fort Gibson, Oklahoma	Central Oklahoma

== Statistics ==
=== Scoring ===
Scores by quarter (non-conference opponents)

	1	2	3	4	Total
Non-con opponents	34	31	22	21	108
Missouri State	0	41	3	0	44

Scores by quarter (MFVC opponents)

	1	2	3	4	Total
MVFC opponents	23	61	10	21	115
Missouri State	35	20	31	35	121

Scores by quarter (All opponents)

	1	2	3	4	Total
All opponents	57	92	32	42	223
Missouri State	35	61	34	35	165
