= Robert W. Plaster Stadium =

Stadium in Springfield, Missouri, US

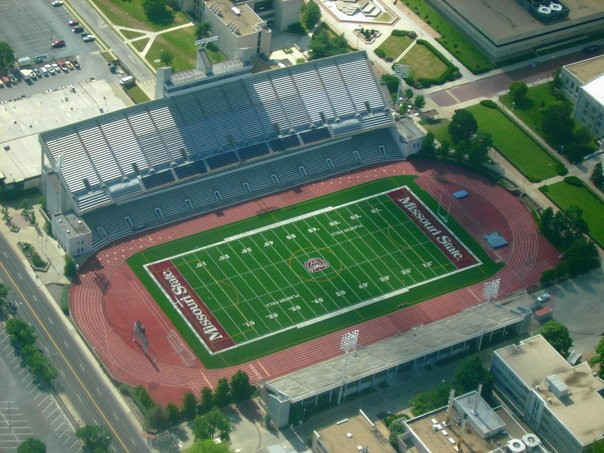
- Aerial view of the stadium in 2006
- Interactive map of Robert W. Plaster Stadium
- Former names: SMS Stadium (1941–1970); Briggs Stadium (1970–1991); Plaster Sports Complex (1992–2013)
- Location: 1015 East Grand Street; Springfield, Missouri 65897
- Coordinates: 37°11′52″N 93°16′47″W
- Owner: Missouri State University
- Operator: Missouri State University
- Capacity: 17,500 (2014–present); 16,300 (1997–2013); 16,600 (1992–1996); 10,000 (1965–1991); 8,500 (1941–1964)
- Surface: Sport Turf
- Public transit: Springfield Transit Services

Construction
- Groundbreaking: 1941
- Opened: September 19, 1941
- Renovated: 1991, 2014
- Cost: $60,000 ($1.31 million in 2025 dollars)
- Architects: Hood-Rich Architects (1991 structure); Hastings+Chivetta Architecture (2014 renovation)

Tenant
- Missouri State Bears football (NCAA)

Plaster Stadium (formerly SMS Stadium, Briggs Stadium, and Plaster Sports Complex) is a 17,500-seat football stadium located in Springfield, Missouri. It is home to the Missouri State Bears football team.

== History ==
The stadium was built in 1941 as SMS Stadium, a Works Progress Administration project at a cost of only $60,000, before World War II broke out. Its original seating capacity was 8,500. In 1970 it was renamed Briggs Stadium after Arthur Briggs, the school's all-time winningest coach.

=== Renovations ===
In 1991, the stadium was renamed the Plaster Sports Complex in honor of Robert W. Plaster, chairman of Evergreen Investments of Lebanon, Missouri. Mr. Plaster donated funds for major renovations of the stadium, including expansion of the stadium to its current capacity, including the addition of an upper deck which seats 8,500, 24 luxury suites holding 10 each, a 40-seat luxury box and a new press box. In addition, a new running track and new artificial turf were installed.

The artificial turf was replaced in 2001 with a FieldTurf surface and in 2006 a new FieldTurf surface was installed. A new scoreboard was added in 2008. It was determined that at the conclusion of the 2013 football season, the aging student (East) bleachers would be torn down. After the student body passed the B.E.A.R. Fee, money was in place to rebuild the student section (East) side. The stadium renovation also included the removal of the track as well as the re-positioning of the field with a new Sport Turf playing surface.

Robert W. Plaster Stadium also includes 12 American handball/racquetball courts, including two courts with spectator seating. The complex also features Health and Fitness, and Athletics Strength and Conditioning centers on the second level of the stadium.

== High school football ==
For many years Plaster Stadium held many of the annual Missouri State High School Activities Association state football championship games. In 1996 all games were moved to the Edward Jones Dome in St. Louis, where they remained through 2015. Following the Rams' move back to Los Angeles in January 2016, the MSHSAA voted to return the games to Plaster Field in 2016 and Faurot Field at the University of Missouri in Columbia in 2017.

== Attendance records ==
Rank	Attendance	Date	Game Result
1	18,386	September 13, 2014	Missouri State 38, North Dakota 0
2	17,835	September 12, 2015	Missouri State 21, Chadron State 13
3	16,672	August 28, 1997	Pittsburg State 9, #21 Southwest Missouri State 8
4	15,878	November 2, 1996	#13 Western Illinois 23, #7 Southwest Missouri State 17
5	15,647	September 9, 2000	Southwest Missouri State 48, Missouri Southern 3
6	15,634	November 1, 1997	#25 Northern Iowa 23, Southwest Missouri State 22
7	15,579	September 14, 1991	#13 Southwest Missouri State 7, McNeese State 3
8	15,547	October 16, 1999	#8 Northern Iowa 29, Southwest Missouri State 17
9	15,537	October 18, 2014	Missouri State 38, South Dakota 12
10	15,122	October 23, 2004	#1 Southern Illinois 27, Southwest Missouri State 3

== See also ==
- List of NCAA Division I FBS football stadiums
