= Tom Rowland (American football) =

American football player and coach (born 1945)

Biographical details
- Born: 1945 (age 80–81)

Playing career
- 1964–1967: Illinois College
- 1968–1970: Hartford Knights
- 1971: Bridgeport Jets
- Position: Cornerback

Coaching career (HC unless noted)

Wrestling
- 1974–2006: Illinois College

Football
- 1973–1984: Illinois College (assistant)
- 1998–2002: Illinois College

Head coaching record
- Overall: 17–32 (football)

Thomas Rowland (born 1945) is an American former football player and coach. He coached wrestling at Illinois College, his alma mater, for over thirty years. He was also the head football coach there from 1998 to 2002.

== Playing career ==
Rowland grew up in Rushville, Illinois, and attended Rushville High School (now Rushville-Industry High School). At Illinois College, he set the NAIA single-season interception record in 1967, with fifteen. As of 2025, his record stands, shared with Kevin Gribbin of Westminster College (1987) and Mike Page of Minot State University (1992).

After college, Rowland had a brief career in the Atlantic Coast Football League, including three seasons with the Hartford Knights (1968–1970) and one with the Bridgeport Jets (1971). Rowland signed with the Green Bay Packers and Denver Broncos in 1968 and 1969, respectively, but never saw the field with either team.

== Coaching career ==
Rowland returned to Illinois College in 1973 as "instructor in physical education, head track and swimming coach and assistant football coach." He became head coach of wrestling in 1974 when Illinois College reinstated the program. Rowland stopped being an assistant football coach in 1984.

Illinois College named Rowland interim head football coach one game into the 1998 season, replacing Rich Johanningmeier. He was made the permanent head coach at the end of the season. Rowland resigned as the head football coach in January 2023; Aaron Keen succeeded him. Illinois College discontinued wrestling in April 2006.

== Head coaching record ==
=== College ===
Year	Team	Overall	Conference	Standing	Bowl/playoffs
Illinois College Blueboys (Midwest Conference) (1998–2002)
1998	Illinois College	0–9 (Note: Rowland replaced Rich Johanningmeier after the first game.)	0–9		
1999	Illinois College	2–8	2–7		
2000	Illinois College	6–4	5–4		
2001	Illinois College	6–4	4–4		
2002	Illinois College	3–7	2–7		
Illinois College:		17–32	13–31		
Total:		17–32			
