= Wanny Woldstad =

Norwegian driving, hunting and animal trapping

Wanny Woldstad (January 15, 1893 – October 26, 1959) was the first female hunter on the remote Norwegian archipelago of Svalbard.

== Early life and career ==
Wanny Woldstad was born Ivanna Margrethe Ingvardsen in Sommarøy, Norway, in 1893. Around 1915, she married Othar Jacobsen, with whom she had two sons, Alf and Bjørvik. Othar died during the Spanish flu pandemic, in 1918, and she briefly remarried Martin Mikal Woldstad.

Beginning in the 1920s, she worked as a taxi driver in the Norwegian city of Tromsø, becoming the first woman to drive a cab there. Some of her passengers were trappers returning from the Arctic outpost of Svalbard, who would brag about their exploits and how much money they were making.

== Svalbard expeditions ==
In 1932, Woldstad was recruited for an expedition to Svalbard led by Anders Sæterdal, immediately accepting the offer to join. With this, she became the first female trapper in the remote archipelago.

Some of her male peers on the trip were skeptical that Woldstad, at only 1.57 meters (5.2 ft) tall, could keep up, but she was an excellent hunter, having previously won trophies for marksmanship. She shot her first polar bear that December. She returned to the islands, specifically to Hornsund, in 1933 and 1934, bringing along her sons, who became trappers themselves. As a trapper, Woldstad generally focused on the area around the bay of Hyttevika. She would spend five seasons in all on Svalbard, in which time she and her hunting partners killed 77 polar bears, in addition to foxes and geese.

== Later years ==
After closing out her time as a hunter, Woldstad settled on a farm with Sæterdal, with whom she was almost certainly involved romantically, but the pair split up five years later.

In her later years, she frequently gave lectures on her Svalbard experiences around Norway. She published a memoir of her time as an Arctic hunter, titled The First Woman Trapper on Svalbard, in 1956. It was later reprinted and translated into English as Wanny Get Your Gun. Notable in Woldstad's writings is her use of masculine term fangstmann (trapper) to describe herself, instead of the expected feminine fangstkvinne.

She died in 1959, after being hit by a truck in Sørkjosen.
