= Aaron Keen =

American football player and coach (born 1972)

Current position
- Title: Head coach
- Team: Washington University
- Conference: NCAC
- Record: 38–15

Biographical details
- Born: June 27, 1972 (age 54); Cheyenne, Wyoming, U.S.
- Education: Missouri

Playing career
- 1990–1993: Washington University
- Position: Quarterback

Coaching career (HC unless noted)
- 1994: Washington University (TE)
- 1995–1998: Washington University (LB/ST)
- 1999–2002: Washington University (OC/QB)
- 2003–2007: Illinois College
- 2008–2010: Nebraska–Omaha (OC)
- 2011: Minnesota State (OC)
- 2012–2013: Minnesota State (interim HC / OC)
- 2014–2016: Eastern Michigan (ST/TE)
- 2017–2019: Eastern Michigan (OC/QB)
- 2020–present: Washington University

Head coaching record
- Overall: 85–44
- Bowls: 0–3
- Tournaments: 2–2 (NCAA D-II playoffs)

Accomplishments and honors

Championships
- 2 NSIC (2012–2013)

Aaron Keen (born June 27, 1972) is an American college football coach and former player. He is the head football coach for Washington University in St. Louis, a position he has held since 2020. Keen served as the head football coach at the Illinois College from 2003 to 2007 and as the interim head football coach at Minnesota State University, Mankato from 2012 to 2013. He has also been an assistant coach at Eastern Michigan University and the University of Nebraska Omaha.

== Playing career ==
Aaron and his twin brother, John, were born on June 27, 1972, in Cheyenne, Wyoming, to Jim, a high school football coach, and Anita, an elementary school teacher. Their grandfather, Allen "Rabbit" Keen, played halfback for the Philadelphia Eagles of the National Football League from 1937 to 1938. Aaron and John played football at Cheyenne East High School; Aaron played quarterback and graduated valedictorian of his class. Aaron's best friend at Cheyenne East was Brad McCaslin, who played wide receiver and defensive back. The two's coaching careers overlapped several times in the following decades.

Both brothers attended Washington University in St. Louis and made the football team. The head coach was Larry Kindbom, then at the beginning of a 31-year stint at Washington. Aaron started at quarterback for three years at Washington, and as a senior set a new all-time passing record for Washington of 4,083 yards. John played defensive end and tight end; in the latter role he caught passes from his brother. At the end of his senior year Aaron was considered for the inaugural Gagliardi Trophy, awarded to an NCAA Division III football player for excellence in athletics, academics and community service. The NCAA awarded Aaron a post-graduate scholarship in 1994.

== Coaching career ==
Following graduation both brothers joined Kindbom's coaching staff; their paths finally diverged in 1999 when John departed the coaching staff to attend the University of Missouri School of Law. He entered private practice and died in 2019 at the early age of 47. Aaron Keen's first role on the coaching staff was tight ends coach for the 1994 season. He remained on the staff through the end of the 2002 season, spending the last four as offensive coordinator. In early 2003 he departed Washington University to become head coach at Illinois College in Jacksonville, Illinois, replacing Tom Rowland.

=== Illinois College and Nebraska–Omaha ===
Illinois College, a Division III school like Washington University, competed in the Midwest Conference. Keen retained much of Rowland's staff; one noteworthy hire was defensive coordinator Jim Ryan, who had held the same position at Colorado College. In five seasons Keen compiled an overall record of 23–27; the team's best finish was 4th in conference play in 2004 and 2006. Keen departed Illinois after the 2008 season to become offensive coordinator at the University of Nebraska Omaha, replacing Terrence Samuel. His replacement at Illinois was Garrett Campbell, formerly offensive coordinator at Carthage College in Kenosha, Wisconsin.

The University of Nebraska Omaha (UNO), under long-time head coach Pat Behrns, was coming off three consecutive appearances in the NCAA Division II Football Championship, making it to the second round each time. After the 2007 season the school changed conferences, moving from the North Central Conference to the more competitive Mid-America Intercollegiate Athletics Association (MIAA). The move to UNO reunited him with Brad McCaslin, who had been on the staff there since 1997 and defensive coordinator from 2005. Keen and McCaslin found themselves suddenly out of a job in the spring of 2011 when UNO decided to transition to NCAA Division I and join the Summit League. As part of this change, UNO dropped football and wrestling.

=== Minnesota State ===
Keen landed on his feet, taking over as offensive coordinator at Minnesota State University, Mankato in Mankato, Minnesota, under head coach Todd Hoffner. Minnesota State competed in the NCAA Division II Northern Sun Intercollegiate Conference. Keen found himself thrust into an unusual and difficult situation in 2012, when Hoffner was charged with possessing child pornography and suspended from his duties. Hoffner was eventually exonerated and returned to his position for the 2014 season, but Keen acted as head coach for the 2012 and 2013 seasons.

In his first season Keen led Minnesota State to a 13–1 record and an appearance in the NCAA Division II Football Championship, making it all the way to the semifinals. Minnesota State changed his title from "acting" to "interim" head coach. In 2013 Minnesota State went 11–1, again winning its conference and earning a place in the championship, though it lost in the second round. Minnesota State reinstated Hoffner in early 2014, leading to a brief revolt by the players who objected to the supersession of Keen. Hoffner met with the players and the question of his return was resolved amicably, but Keen departed two weeks later to become the special teams coordinator and tight ends coach at Eastern Michigan University.

=== Eastern Michigan ===
The move to Eastern Michigan again reunited him with McCaslin, who had followed new head coach Chris Creighton from Drake University after the 2013 season. Eastern Michigan, located in Ypsilanti, Michigan, competed in the Mid-American Conference of the NCAA Division I Football Bowl Subdivision. Eastern's defense struggled, and McCaslin was fired after the 2015 season. Creighton promoted to Keen to offensive coordinator in 2017 after Kalen DeBoer departed to become offensive coordinator at Fresno State. Keen's tenure at Eastern Michigan was successful, and after the 2019 season he departed to become a head coach again–at Washington University, his alma mater.

=== Washington University ===
At Washington University, Keen's former head coach Larry Kindbom was retiring after 31 years. The two men had remained close; when John Keen died in 2019 Kindbom took on the job of communicating the news to Aaron and John's former teammates. Washington University now competed as an affiliate member of the College Conference of Illinois and Wisconsin, still within Division III. The COVID-19 pandemic led to Washington University suspending fall sports for the 2020 year, delaying Keen's coaching debut there.

== Head coaching record ==
Year	Team	Overall	Conference	Standing	Bowl/playoffs	AFCA^{#}
Illinois College Blueboys (Midwest Conference) (2003–2007)
2003	Illinois College	4–6	3–6	7th		
2004	Illinois College	6–4	5–4	4th		
2005	Illinois College	3–7	2–7	9th		
2006	Illinois College	6–4	6–3	4th		
2007	Illinois College	4–6	4–5	6th		
Illinois College:		23–27	20–25			
Minnesota State Mavericks (Northern Sun Intercollegiate Conference) (2012–2013)
2012	Minnesota State	13–1	11–0	1st	L NCAA Division II Semifinal	3
2013	Minnesota State	11–1	11–0	1st	L NCAA Division II Second Round	6
Minnesota State:		24–2	22–0			
Washington University Bears (College Conference of Illinois and Wisconsin) (2020–2025)
2020–21	No team—COVID-19					
2021	Washington University	7–4	7–2	3rd	L Isthmus	
2022	Washington University	8–3	7–2	3rd	L Isthmus	
2023	Washington University	7–3	6–3	4th		
2024	Washington University	8–2	7–2	3rd		
2025	Washington University	8–3	7–2	3rd	L Isthmus	
Washington University Bears (North Coast Athletic Conference) (2026–present)
2026	Washington University	0–0	0–0			
Washington University:		38–15	34–11			
Total:		85–44				
National championship Conference title Conference division title or championship game berth
