= Brad McCaslin =

American football coach and player

Playing career
- 1990–1994: Hastings
- Position: Wide receiver

Coaching career (HC unless noted)
- 1995–1996: Benson HS (NE) (assistant)
- 1997–1999: Nebraska–Omaha (GA)
- 2000–2004: Nebraska–Omaha (DL)
- 2005–2006: Nebraska–Omaha (DC)
- 2007–2010: Nebraska–Omaha (AHC/DC)
- 2012–2013: Drake (DC)
- 2014–2015: Eastern Michigan (DC)
- 2016–2017: Buffalo (defensive analyst)
- 2018: Benedictine (IL)
- 2019: Buffalo (DT)

Head coaching record
- Overall: 3–7

Bradley X. McCaslin is an American football coach and former player. He was most recently the defensive tackles coach at the University at Buffalo. He was previously head coach at Benedictine University, and a long-time assistant at the University of Nebraska Omaha prior to the discontinuance of football at that institution after the 2010 season. He also spent four seasons as a defensive coordinator under Chris Creighton at Drake University and Eastern Michigan University.

== Playing career ==
McCaslin grew up in Cheyenne, Wyoming, and played football at Cheyenne East High School. McCaslin's best friend at Cheyenne East was Aaron Keen, who also played on the football team and whose father was the head coach. The two's coaching careers would overlap several times in the following decades. He attended Hastings College in Hastings, Nebraska, graduating with a degree in 1995. At Hastings, he played wide receiver for head coach Dan Kratzer.

== Coaching career ==
=== Nebraska–Omaha ===
Following his graduation from Hastings in 1995, McCaslin taught at Benson High School in Omaha, Nebraska, also serving as an assistant football coach. In 1997 he became a graduate assistant at the then-NCAA Division II University of Nebraska Omaha (UNO) of the North Central Conference under head coach Pat Behrns, inaugurating a 14-year tenure at that institution. Also on the staff at that time was Lance Leipold, who would later hire McCaslin as an assistant at the University at Buffalo.

McCaslin steadily ascended the coaching ranks at UNO on the defensive side of the ball, becoming defensive line coach in 2000 and defensive coordinator in 2005. He gained the title of associate head coach in 2007. McCaslin had hopes of eventually succeeding Behrns as head coach, reflecting later that "I felt like I was on a path...It was definitely a desire of mine to try and become the head coach down the road." Keen joined the staff in 2008 as offensive coordinator. McCaslin's career at UNO came to a halt in the spring of 2011 when the school decided to transition to NCAA Division I and join the Summit League. As part of this change, UNO dropped football and wrestling.

=== Drake and Eastern Michigan ===
McCaslin briefly made a living in the Omaha area working in sales before moving back into coaching. He was a candidate for the head coaching jobs at two schools: South Dakota School of Mines and Technology (SDSM&T) in Rapid City, South Dakota, and Chadron State College in Chadron, Nebraska. At SDSM&T he would have succeeded the retiring Dan Kratzer, his former coach at Hastings. In the end, the jobs went to Stacy Collins and Jay Long, respectively.

McCaslin eventually landed at Drake University in Des Moines, Iowa, as defensive coordinator for the 2012 season, after reaching out to head coach Chris Creighton. McCaslin replaced Brian Ward, who had left to take a similar job with Western Illinois University. Drake completed in the Pioneer Football League (part of the NCAA Football Championship Subdivision) for football. McCaslin served as defensive coordinator for the 2012 and 2013 seasons; Drake's 2013 defense ranked fifth in the FCS in rushing. When Creighton departed Drake for the Eastern Michigan University head coaching job after the 2013 season, he brought McCaslin with him as his new defensive coordinator. Before the start of the 2014 season Eastern hired Keen, recently interim head coach at Minnesota State University, Mankato, as special teams coordinator.

Eastern Michigan competed in the Mid-American Conference (MAC) of the Football Bowl Subdivision (FBS). McCaslin inherited a defense which had ranked in the bottom quarter of the FBS the previous year. Eastern Michigan struggled on both sides of the ball during Creighton's first two years, to the point that the faculty union and student government would question the viability of continuing the program in early 2016. The 2015 team had the worst defense in FBS. Eastern fired McCaslin after the season; Neal Neathery, another former Drake defensive coordinator, replaced him.

=== Buffalo and Benedictine ===
The University at Buffalo, also a school in the Mid-American Conference, hired McCaslin as a defensive analyst for the 2016 season under head coach and former fellow UNO assistant Lance Leipold. After two seasons in Buffalo, McCaslin accepted the heading coaching job at Benedictine University in Lisle, Illinois, which competed in the NCAA Division III Northern Athletics Collegiate Conference. In his one season at Benedictine, McCaslin posted a 3–7 record. Following the season, McCaslin resigned and returned to Buffalo as defensive tackles coach.

== Personal life ==
McCaslin married Erin R. Heikes in 1998. They have three children.

== Head coaching record ==
Year	Team	Overall	Conference	Standing	Bowl/playoffs
Benedictine Eagles (Northern Athletics Collegiate Conference) (2018)
2018	Benedictine	3–7	3–4	5th	
Benedictine:		3–7	3–4		
Total:		3–7			
