= Orville Pottenger =

American football player and coach (1921–1978)

Biographical details
- Born: November 7, 1921
- Died: April 9, 1978 (aged 56)

Playing career
- 1938–1941: SW Missouri State
- Position: Center

Coaching career (HC unless noted)
- 1952–1955: Lamar HS (MO)
- 1956–1960: Parkview HS (MO)
- 1961–1964: SW Missouri State

Head coaching record
- Overall: 24–12–1 (college); 53–31–5 (high school)
- Bowls: 0–1

Accomplishments and honors

Championships
- 1 MIAA (1963)

William Orville "Potch" Pottenger (November 7, 1921 – April 9, 1978) was an American football player and coach.

== Career ==
Pottenger served as the head football coach at his alma mater, Southwest Missouri State University now known as Missouri State University—in Springfield, Missouri, from 1961 to 1964, compiling a record of 24–12–1. Pottenger was a three-time letter-winner at Southwest Missouri State, from 1939 to 1941. He was the head football coach at Lamar High School in Lamar, Missouri from 1952 to 1955 and Parkview High School in Springfield from 1956 to 1960.

Before that, beginning June 1949, Pottenger was an assistant football coach at Southwestern University, Georgetown, Texas, under head coach Spot Collins (1922–1996). Pottenger and Collins were also members of the Marine Corps Reserve unit, Company A (a rifle company), 15th Infantry Battalion, of Austin. Company A was mobilized July 27, 1950, after the outbreak of the Korean War. The company was composed of about 160 men, half of whom had served in World War II. Company A also included Lieutenant John Hargis (1920–1986), a basketball star of the University of Texas. Pottenger served in the Marines during World War II and the Korean War.

In 1954, Pottenger earned a Master of Education degree from the University of Texas at Austin.

In 1968, while serving as director of athletics for the Springfield Public School system, Col. Pottenger relieved Col. Lang Rogers (né Harrison Lang Rogers; 1919–2002) of Joplin as Commanding Officer of the Marine Corps Volunteer Training Unit 9-15. Col. Rogers was also editor and publisher of The Joplin Globe and News Herald.

== Head coaching record ==
=== College ===
Year	Team	Overall	Conference	Standing	Bowl/playoffs
Southwest Missouri State Bears (Missouri Intercollegiate Athletics Association) (1961–1964)
1961	Southwest Missouri State	4–4–1	2–3	T–4th	
1962	Southwest Missouri State	5–3–1	3–2	3rd	
1963	Southwest Missouri State	9–1	5–0	1st	L Mineral Water
1964	Southwest Missouri State	6–4	3–2	3rd	
Southwest Missouri State:		24–12–1	13–7		
Total:		24–12–1			
National championship Conference title Conference division title or championship game berth

== Bibliography ==
=== References ===
- "MSU Athletics Hall of Fame: Orville Pottenger". Missouri State Bears.
- "Pottenger Heads Marine Reserves". Springfield Leader and Press. Vol. 36, no. 19. Springfield, Missouri. June 6, 1968 – via Newspapers.com.
- "Pottenger New SMS Coach". Sunday News and Leader. Vol. 33, no. 22. Springfield, Missouri. December 18, 1960 – via Newspapers.com.
- Pottenger, William Orville (1954). Professional Preparation and Work Load of Coaches in Missouri High Schools Not Participating in Interscholastic Football (thesis – M.Ed.). Austin: University of Texas. OCLC 39156516 (includes vitae) – 132 Pages; Incl. 55 Leaves of Illustrations
- "Spot Collins, Les Procter Ordered to Marine Duty". Austin Statesman. Vol. 79, no. 365 (City ed.). Austin: American Publishing Company. July 25, 1950 – via Newspapers.com.
- "2019 Media Guide" (PDF). Missouri State Bears. 2019.
- "W. Pottenger Dies in Texas Hospital". Springfield Daily News. Vol. 88, no. 71. Springfield, Missouri. April 10, 1978 – via Newspapers.com.
