= Cheyenne East High School =

Public high school in Wyoming, United States

Location
- 2800 East Pershing Boulevard; Cheyenne, Wyoming 82001; United States; 41°08′48″N 104°46′39″W

Information
- Type: Public high school
- Motto: Cheyenne East Together (2022-23)
- Established: 1960
- Principal: Marc Kerschner
- Teaching staff: 99.74 (FTE)
- Grades: 9–12
- Enrollment: 1,506 (2023-2024)
- Student to teacher ratio: 15.10
- Colors: Blue; Black
- Athletics conference: Wyoming High School Activities Association
- Mascot: Thunderbird
- Accreditation: Laramie County School District #1, Wyoming Department of Education
- Website: east.laramie1.org

Cheyenne East High School is a public high school located in Cheyenne, Wyoming, with approximately 1,500 students enrolled in grades nine through twelve. It serves Laramie County School District #1. Students from East Triad schools attend East High School. These schools include: Carey JHS, Alta Vista ES, Anderson ES, Baggs ES, Buffalo Ridge ES, Dildine ES, Henderson ES, Meadowlark ES, and Saddle Ridge ES.

As of the 2022-23 school year, the school had an enrollment of 1,513 students and 98 classroom teachers (on an FTE basis), for a student–teacher ratio of 15.4:1. There was 318 students (21% of enrollment) eligible for free lunch and 143 (9.45% of students) eligible for reduced-cost lunch.

== Academics ==
East offers numerous AP courses, as well as the International Baccalaureate program, an advanced curricular course that encompasses all of a student's core classes. It also encourages students to participate in many beneficial programs such as The Congressional Award and National Honor Society.

== Speech and debate ==
The East High Speech and Debate team was formally led by coach Michael Starks, who was inducted to the NSDA's Hall of Fame in 2006. The team has won District and State Sweepstakes, receiving recognition for their accomplishments. Many students go on to qualify and win national tournaments, They have won the yearly National Speech and Debate Association's national tournament. East High also hosts the "Holiday Classic" tournament which brings in hundreds of competitors from schools in Wyoming, Colorado and Nebraska.

== Athletics ==
The East High School Football team has won the state championship five times: in 1970, 1974, 2007, 2013, and 2020. The East High Cheerleaders placed first in all-girl stunt in 2004, 2008 and 2010. The East High Lady Thunderbirds basketball team won the state title in 4A basketball in 2010. In 2011, the Cheyenne East boys' indoor track team won the state title. The Lady Thunderbirds volleyball and swim teams took home state championships in 2012. The Lady Thunderbirds soccer team won consecutive state titles in 2013 and 2014. The T-Birds won state football in 2013.

== Marching band ==
Cheyenne East Marching Band goes to the State Marching Festival every year and has scored the top possible score since 1999. They were State Champions in 1983, 1984, 1986, 1987, 1988, and 1989.

== Notable alumni ==
- Trey Harrington – three-time Wyoming soccer player of the year
- James Johnson - professional basketball player, Indiana Pacers
- Daniel Junge - Academy Award-winning documentary filmmaker
- Aaron Keen - college football coach
- Cynthia Lummis - United States Senator and former member of the U.S. House of Representatives
- Brad McCaslin - college football coach
- Brandon Nimmo - outfielder for New York Mets
- Tracy Ringolsby - columnist for MLB.com
