= Rich Johanningmeier =

American football player and coach, athletics administrator (born 1943)

Biographical details
- Born: 1943 (age 82–83)

Playing career
- 1961–1963: Southwest Missouri State
- 1964: Springfield Acorns
- 1965: Hartford Charter Oaks
- 1966: Brooklyn Dodgers
- Position: Tackle

Coaching career (HC unless noted)
- 1965: Technical HS (MA) (part-time)
- 1967: American International (assistant)
- 1968–1970: Vermont (OL)
- 1971–1973: American International (assistant)
- 1974–1975: Connecticut (OC)
- 1976–1985: Southwest Missouri State
- 1995–1998: Illinois College

Administrative career (AD unless noted)
- 1990–1995: Washburn
- 1995–1998: Illinois College

Head coaching record
- Overall: 64–66–5

Accomplishments and honors

Championships
- 1 MIAA (1978)

Awards
- Missouri State Bears No. 71 retired

Richard A. Johanningmeier (born 1943) is a retired American football player and coach and college athletics administrator. He served as the head football coach at Southwest Missouri State University—now known as Missouri State University from 1976 to 1985 and Illinois College from 1995 to 1997, compiling a career college football coaching record of 64–66–5

Johanningmeier played college football at Southwest Missouri State as a tackle. He then played professionally with the Springfield Acorns of the Atlantic Coast Football League (ACFL) and the Hartford Charter Oaks of the Continental Football League (COFL). In 1965, Johanningmeier taught special education at Chestnut Junior High School in Springfield, Massachusetts, and was a part-time football coach at Springfield's Technical High School. He was an assistant football coach at American International College in Springfield, before going to the University of Vermont in 1968. He served as offensive line coach at Vermont for three seasons, and then returned, in 1971, to American International as an assistant coach. In 1969, Johanningmeier received a master's degree in education from Springfield College. Johanningmeier was the offensive coordinator at the University of Connecticut for two seasons, from 1974 to 1975. He succeeded Don Cross as head football coach at his alma mater, Southwest Missouri State, in 1976.

Illinois College hired Johanningmeier as its head football coach and athletic director on June 27, 1995. Illinois fired Johanningmeier one game into the 1998 season, following a 42–6 loss to Westminster College. Tom Rowland took over as interim coach, and was later named his permanent replacement.

== Head coaching record ==
=== College ===
Year	Team	Overall	Conference	Standing	Bowl/playoffs
Southwest Missouri State Bears (Missouri Intercollegiate Athletics Association) (1976–1980)
1976	Southwest Missouri State	5–6	4–2	T–3rd	
1977	Southwest Missouri State	6–3–1	3–2–1	4th	
1978	Southwest Missouri State	8–3	6–0	1st	
1979	Southwest Missouri State	7–4	3–3	T–3rd	
1980	Southwest Missouri State	6–5	5–1	2nd	
Southwest Missouri State Bears (Association of Mid-Continent Universities) (1981–1984)
1981	Southwest Missouri State	3–5–2	0–3	4th	
1982	Southwest Missouri State	5–6	1–2	3rd	
1983	Southwest Missouri State	6–5	2–1	2nd	
1984	Southwest Missouri State	6–3–1	1–1–1	3rd	
Southwest Missouri State Bears (Gateway Football Conference) (1985)
1985	Southwest Missouri State	6–4–1	2–2–1	2nd	
Southwest Missouri State:		58–44–5	27–17–3		
Illinois College Blueboys (Midwest Conference) (1995–1998)
1995	Illinois College	2–7	1–4	5th (South)	
1996	Illinois College	3–6	1–4	5th (South)	
1997	Illinois College	1–8	0–3	4th (South)	
1998	Illinois College	0–1 (Note: Illinois fired Johanningmeier after one game. Tom Rowland took over as interim coach.)	0–0		
Illinois College:		6–22	2–11		
Total:		64–66–5			
