= Jim Mentis =

American football and wrestling coach

James Mentis
Biographical details
- Born: December 25, 1925; Mount Vernon, Ohio, U.S.
- Died: December 24, 2012 (aged 86); Mount Vernon, Missouri, U.S.

Playing career

Football
- 1946–1949: Southwest Missouri State
- Positions: End, tackle

Coaching career (HC unless noted)

Football
- 1950–1953: Carthage Senior HS (MO) (assistant)
- 1954–1960: Springfield Central HS (MO)
- 1961–1964: Southwest Missouri State (assistant)
- 1965–1968: Southwest Missouri State

Wrestling
- 1961–1962: Southwest Missouri State

Head coaching record
- Overall: 20–21 (college football)
- Bowls: 0–1

Accomplishments and honors

Championships
- Football; 1 MIAA (1966)

James Edward Mentis (December 25, 1925 – December 24, 2012) was an American football and wrestling and coach. He served as the head football coach at Southwest Missouri State University–now known as Missouri State University–from 1965 to 1968, compiling a record of 20–21. Mentis was also the school's wrestling coach from 1961 to 1962.

== Head coaching record ==
=== College football ===
| Year | Team | Overall | Conference | Standing | Bowl/playoffs |
|---|---|---|---|---|---|
Southwest Missouri State Bears (Missouri Intercollegiate Athletics Association) (1965–1968)
| 1965 | Southwest Missouri State | 7–3 | 4–1 | 2nd | |
| 1966 | Southwest Missouri State | 7–4 | 5–0 | 1st | L Mineral Water |
| 1967 | Southwest Missouri State | 4–6 | 2–3 | T–3rd | |
| 1968 | Southwest Missouri State | 2–8 | 2–3 | T–3rd | |
| Southwest Missouri State: | | 20–21 | 13–7 | | |
| Total: | | 20–21 | | | |
National championship Conference title Conference division title or championship game berth
