= Red Blair =

American football and basketball coach (1900–1947)

Biographical details
- Born: February 21, 1900; Mount Vernon, Ohio, U.S.
- Died: November 30, 1947 (aged 47) near Springfield, Missouri, U.S.

Playing career

Football
- 1920–1922: Ohio State

Basketball
- 1921–1923: Ohio State
- Position: Halfback (football)

Coaching career (HC unless noted)

Football
- 1927–1935: Akron
- 1937: Ohio State (assistant)
- 1938–1946: Springfield / SW Missouri State

Basketball
- 1927–1936: Akron

Administrative career (AD unless noted)
- 1938–1947: Springfield / SW Missouri State

Head coaching record
- Overall: 82–50–12 (football); 89–40 (basketball)

Accomplishments and honors

Championships
- Football; 1 MIAA (1940) Basketball; 1 OAC (1934)

Howard Holt "Red" Blair (February 21, 1900 – November 30, 1947) was an American college football and college basketball player, coach, and athletics administrator in Ohio and Missouri. He served as the head football coach of the University of Akron from 1927 to 1935 and at Southwest Missouri State College—now known as Missouri State University—from 1938 to 1946, compiling a career college football head coaching record of 82–50–12. Blair was also the head coach of Akron Zips men's basketball team from 1927 to 1936, tallying a mark of 89–40. Blair grew up in Mount Vernon, Ohio, and played football and basketball at Ohio State University. He was a member of the 1920 Ohio State Buckeyes football team that played in the Rose Bowl. Blair died on November 30, 1947, at his farm near Springfield, Missouri.

== Head coaching record ==
=== Football ===
Year	Team	Overall	Conference	Standing	Bowl/playoffs
Akron Zippers (Ohio Athletic Conference) (1927–1935)
1927	Akron	5–3	4–3	10th	
1928	Akron	5–4	3–4	T–6th	
1929	Akron	9–1	7–1	4th	
1930	Akron	7–1	5–1	2nd	
1931	Akron	1–7	0–6	T–17th	
1932	Akron	2–4–3	1–4–3	13th	
1933	Akron	5–3–1	5–2–1	T–3rd	
1934	Akron	3–4–1	3–4	T–12th	
1935	Akron	6–3	6–3	T–5th	
Akron:		43–30–5	34–28–4		
Springfield / Southwest Missouri State Bears (Missouri Intercollegiate Athletic Association) (1938–1946)
1938	Springfield	5–2–2	2–2–1	3rd	
1939	Springfield	7–1–1	3–1–1	2nd	
1940	Springfield	10–0	5–0	1st	
1941	Springfield	8–3	3–2	4th	
1942	Springfield	2–7–2	2–2	T–3rd	
1943	No team—World War II				
1944	No team—World War II				
1945	Southwest Missouri State	5–1–2			
1946	Southwest Missouri State	2–6	1–4	5th	
Springfield / Southwest Missouri State:		39–20–7	16–11–2		
Total:		82–50–12			
National championship Conference title Conference division title or championship game berth

=== Basketball ===
Record table
Season	Team	Overall	Conference	Standing	Postseason
Akron Zippers (Ohio Athletic Conference) (1927–1936)
1927–28	Akron	8–5	7–5	7th	
1928–29	Akron	12–3	12–2	2nd	
1929–30	Akron	11–3	10–3	2nd	
1930–31	Akron	4–9	3–8	T–10th	
1931–32	Akron	8–7	7–7	T–6th	
1932–33	Akron	11–3	10–3	T–3rd	
1933–34	Akron	15–1	14–1	1st	
1934–35	Akron	12–3	12–3	T–2nd	
1935–36	Akron	8–6	7–5	10th	
Akron:		89–40	82–37		
Total:		89–40			
National champion Postseason invitational champion Conference regular season champion Conference regular season and conference tournament champion Division regular season champion Division regular season and conference tournament champion Conference tournament champion
