= 1940 Springfield Bears football team =

American college football season

1940 Springfield Bears football
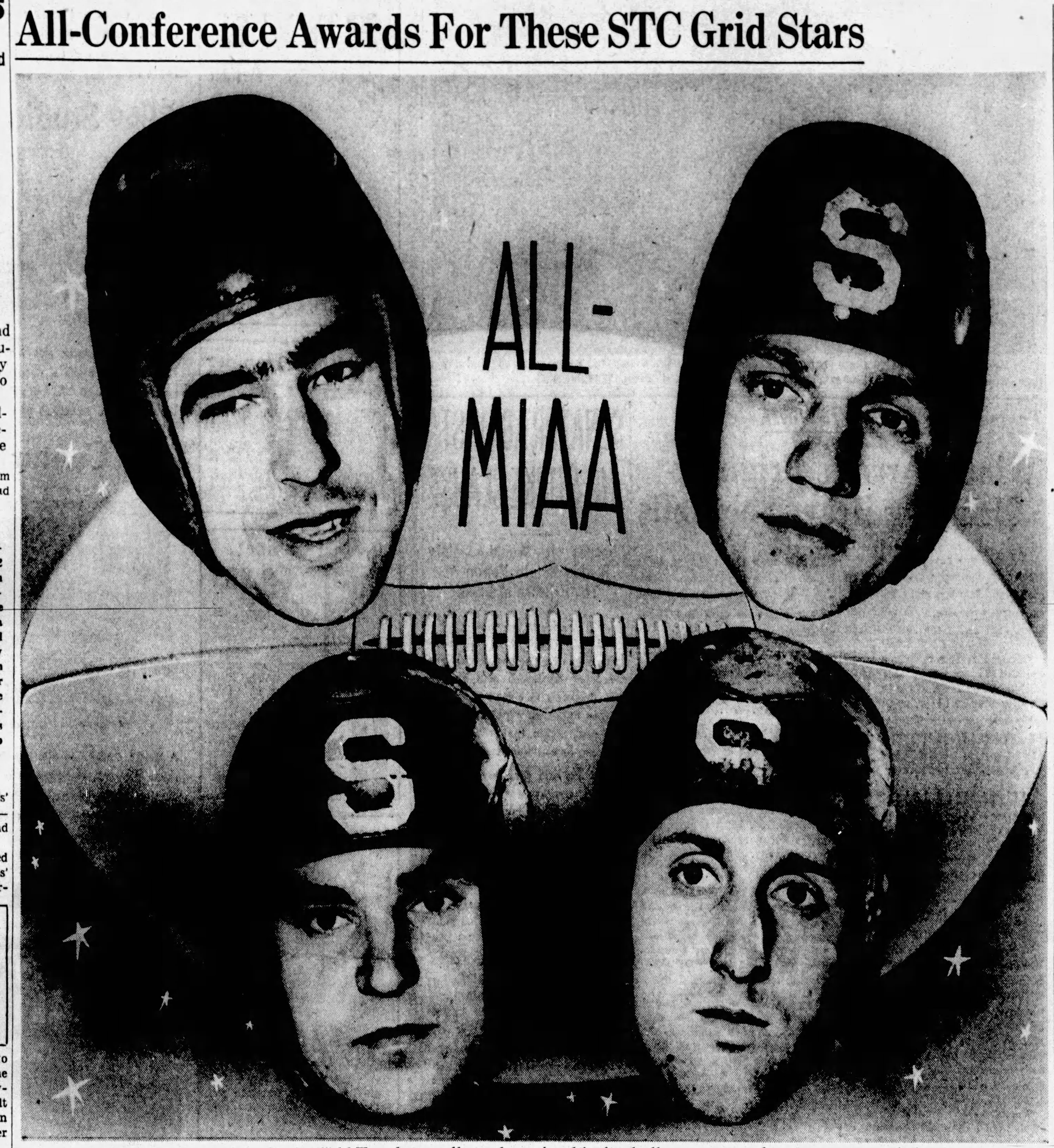
- Dwight Bumpus (upper left); Russell Kaminsky (lower left); Earl Graves (lower right); and Ed Lechner (upper right)

MIAA champion
- Conference: Missouri Intercollegiate Athletic Association
- Record: 10–0 (5–0 MIAA)
- Head coach: Red Blair (3rd season)
- Home stadium: STC Stadium

1940 Missouri Intercollegiate Athletic Association football standings
	Conf.					Overall
Team	W		L		T	W		L		T
Springfield (MO) $	5	–	0	–	0	10	–	0	–	0
Maryville (MO)	3	–	2	–	0	7	–	2	–	0
Missouri Mines	2	–	2	–	1	3	–	3	–	2
Warrensburg	2	–	3	–	0	5	–	4	–	0
Cape Girardeau	1	–	3	–	1	4	–	5	–	1
Kirksville	1	–	4	–	0	4	–	4	–	1
$ – Conference champion

The 1940 Springfield Bears football team was an American football team that represented the Springfield Teachers College (later renamed Missouri State University) as a member of the Missouri Intercollegiate Athletic Association (MIAA) during the 1940 college football season. In their third season under head coach Red Blair, the Bears compiled a perfect 10–0 record (5–0 in conference games), won the MIAA championship, shut out seven of ten opponent, and outscored all opponents by a total of 279 to 20.

Springfield relied on a passing offense led by its quarterback Dwight Bumpus. Despite a preseason accident that cost him part of a finger, the diminutive Bumpus (five feet, six inches tall, and weighing 150 pounds) was called "the hub of the Bears' aerial Circus". At the end of the season, he was the unanimous choose of coaches, officials, and reporters as the quarterback on the 1940 MIAA all-star football team.

One of Bumpus' principal receivers was end Russell Kaminsky. Bumpus and Kaminsky were both Ohio natives who were selected as first-team all-conference players for three consecutive seasons in 1939, 1940, and 1941. Kaminsky also received second-team honors on the 1940 Little All-America college football team. In addition to Bumpus and Kaminsky, two other Springfield Bears were selected as 1940 first-team all-conference players: tackle Earl Graves and en Ed Lechner. Three others were named to the second team: Guy Brashear at fullback; Howard Elliott at tackle; Harry Berry at center.

The team played its home games in Springfield, Missouri.

== Schedule ==
Date	Opponent	Site	Result	Attendance	Source
September 27	Northeastern State*	Springfield, MO	W 38–0		
October 4	at Pittsburg State*	Pittsburg, KS	W 34–0		
October 11	at Kirksville	Kirksville, MO	W 28–0		
October 18	Maryville (MO)	Springfield, MO	W 13–0		
October 25	Southwestern (KS)*	Springfield, MO	W 20–0	1,200	
November 2	Missouri Mines^{†}	Springfield, MO	W 27–7	6,000	
November 8	Warrensburg	Springfield, MO	W 13–0	4,000	
November 15	at Cape Girardeau	Cape Girardeau, MO	W 21–7		
November 21	Arkansas A&M*	Springfield, MO	W 34–0	4,800	
November 30	Hastings*	Springfield, MO	W 51–6		
*Non-conference game; ^{†}Homecoming
