= Walter Langston =

American football player & coach (1884–1978)

Biographical details
- Born: November 9, 1884
- Died: April 12, 1978 (aged 93); Springfield, Missouri, U.S.
- Education: Boston U. School of Theology

Playing career
- 1905: Drury

Coaching career (HC unless noted)
- 1909: Springfield Normal

Head coaching record
- Overall: 4–2

Walter William Langston (November 9, 1884 – April 12, 1978) was an American college football player and coach. He served as the head football coach at Fourth District Normal School—now known as Missouri State University—in Springfield, Missouri for one season, in 1909, compiling a record of 4–2.

Langston was a graduate of Drury College—now known as Drury University–and attended the Boston University School of Theology. He later worked as an insurance agent and a farmer. Langston died on April 12, 1978, at Cox Medical Center in Springfield.

== Head coaching record ==
Year	Team	Overall	Conference	Standing	Bowl/playoffs
Springfield Normal (Independent) (1909)
1909	Springfield Normal	4–2			
Springfield Normal:		4–2			
Total:		4–2			
