= Jesse Branch =

American football player and coach (born 1941)

Biographical details
- Born: February 1, 1941 (age 85); Pine Bluff, Arkansas, U.S.

Playing career
- 1961–1962: Arkansas
- 1963–1964: Calgary Stampeders
- 1965: Edmonton Eskimos
- Position: Halfback

Coaching career (HC unless noted)
- 1966: Mississippi State (OB)
- 1967–1971: Kansas State (DB)
- 1972: Oregon (DC/DB)
- 1973: Oregon (OC)
- 1974: Kansas State (DL)
- 1975: Arkansas (WR)
- 1976: Arkansas (OB)
- 1977–1979: Arkansas (WR)
- 1980: Arkansas (DB)
- 1981–1982: Arkansas (WR)
- 1983: Arkansas (OB)
- 1984–1985: Arkansas (WR)
- 1986–1994: Southwest Missouri State
- 2001–2004: Henderson State

Administrative career (AD unless noted)
- 1995–2000: Arkansas (associate AD)

Head coaching record
- Overall: 67–75–1
- Tournaments: 1–2 (NCAA I-AA playoffs)

Accomplishments and honors

Championships
- 2 Gateway Football (1989–1990)

Awards
- 2× Gateway Football Coach of the Year (1989–1990); First-team All-SWC (1962)

Jesse Branch (born February 1, 1941) is an American former football player, coach, and college athletics administrator. He served as the head football coach at Southwest Missouri State University – now Missouri State University – from 1986 to 1994, and Henderson State University from 2001 through 2004, compiling an overall college football record of 67 wins, 75 losses, and one tie. Branch also was the associate athletic director at the University of Arkansas from 1995 until 2000.

== Head coaching record ==
Year	Team	Overall	Conference	Standing	Bowl/playoffs	NCAA^{#}
Southwest Missouri State Bears (Gateway Football Conference) (1986–1994)
1986	Southwest Missouri State	3–7	1–5	T–6th		
1987	Southwest Missouri State	5–6	3–3	T–3rd		
1988	Southwest Missouri State	5–5	4–2	T–2nd		
1989	Southwest Missouri State	10–3	5–1	1st	L NCAA Division I-AA Quarterfinal	9
1990	Southwest Missouri State	9–3	5–1	T–1st	L NCAA Division I-AA First Round	6
1991	Southwest Missouri State	6–4–1	3–3	3rd		
1992	Southwest Missouri State	6–5	4–2	T–2nd		
1993	Southwest Missouri State	7–4	4–2	T–2nd		
1994	Southwest Missouri State	4–7	2–4	T–5th		
Southwest Missouri State:		55–44–1	31–23			
Henderson State Reddies (Gulf South Conference) (2001–2004)
2001	Henderson State	1–10	1–8	11th		
2002	Henderson State	5–6	5–4	T–5th		
2003	Henderson State	4–7	3–6	T–7th		
2004	Henderson State	2–8	2–7	T–11th		
Henderson State:		12–31	11–15			
Total:		67–75–1				
National championship Conference title Conference division title or championship game berth
^{#}Rankings from final NCAA Poll.
