= Springfield News-Leader =

Newspaper in Springfield, Missouri, U.S.

- Type: Daily newspaper
- Owner: USA Today Co.
- Founded: 1867
- Language: English
- Headquarters: Springfield, Missouri, United States
- ISSN: 2995-1925
- Website: news-leader.com

The Springfield News-Leader is the predominant newspaper for the city of Springfield, Missouri, and covers the Ozarks. The News-Leader has a daily circulation of 32,363 and a Sunday circulation of 51,402 as of September 2013.

== History ==
The Springfield Leader began circulation in 1867 and merged with the Springfield Daily News in 1933 to become the Springfield Leader & Press, an afternoon paper; the morning paper was the News & Leader. The newspapers moved to their present site on Boonville Avenue in 1933. That same year, a new press, capable of printing 36,000 sixty-four page papers per hour, was installed.

The plant was destroyed by fire in 1947, but with the help of local printing firms, a four-page newspaper was on the street within a few hours. While the plant was rebuilt, the newspaper was published for several months in Tulsa, Oklahoma and trucked to Springfield.

The newspaper was purchased by Gannett in 1977. Morning and afternoon editions were consolidated to become the Springfield News-Leader in 1987.
