= Aldo Sebben =

American football player and sports coach

Biographical details
- Born: September 20, 1920; Centerville, Iowa, U.S.
- Died: October 7, 1997 (aged 77); Springfield, Missouri, U.S.

Playing career

Football
- 1940–1942: Shurtleff
- 1946: Illinois State
- Position: Center

Coaching career (HC unless noted)

Football
- 1948: Central Methodist (assistant)
- 1949: Florida State (GA)
- 1950–1951: Central (MO)
- 1952–1955: SW Missouri State (assistant)
- 1956–1960: SW Missouri State

Cross country
- 1958–1971: SW Missouri State

Track
- 1952–1972: SW Missouri State

Head coaching record
- Overall: 19–36–1 (football)

Aldo A. Sebben (September 20, 1920 – October 7, 1997) was an American football, cross country, and track and field coach. He served as the head football coach at Central College—now known as Central Methodist University—in Fayette, Missouri from 1950 to 1951 and Missouri State University—then known as Southwest Missouri State University—in Springfield, Missouri from 1956 to 1960, compiling a career college football coaching record of 19–36–1.

== Head coaching record ==
=== Football ===
Year	Team	Overall	Conference	Standing	Bowl/playoffs
Central Eagles (Missouri College Athletic Union) (1951–1952)
1951	Central	1–8	1–3	4th	
1952	Central	1–7	1–3	4th	
Central:		2–15	2–6		
Southwest Missouri State Bears (Missouri Intercollegiate Athletics Association) (1956–1960)
1956	Southwest Missouri State	3–6	3–2	T–3rd	
1957	Southwest Missouri State	4–4–1	2–3	4th	
1958	Southwest Missouri State	4–5	2–3	4th	
1959	Southwest Missouri State	4–5	1–4	T–5th	
1960	Southwest Missouri State	2–7	2–3	4th	
Southwest Missouri State:		17–21–1	10–15		
Total:		19–36–1			
