= Andrew McDonald (coach) =

American athlete and coach (1898–1988)

Biographical details
- Born: September 5, 1898; McLouth, Kansas, U.S.
- Died: August 21, 1988 (aged 89); Springfield, Missouri, U.S.

Playing career

Football
- 1920–1923: Kansas

Basketball
- 1921–1923: Kansas
- Positions: Quarterback, end (football)

Coaching career (HC unless noted)

Football
- 1925–1933: Springfield (MO) (assistant)
- 1934–1937: Springfield (MO)

Basketball
- 1925–1950: Springfield / SW Missouri State

Golf
- 1934–1969: Springfield (MO)

Head coaching record
- Overall: 5–22–5 (football); 301–175 (basketball)

Accomplishments and honors

Championships
- Basketball; 5 MIAA regular season (1928, 1931, 1934–1935, 1949–1950)

Andrew Jesse McDonald (September 5, 1898 – August 21, 1988) was an American college football and college basketball player and coach. He served as the head football coach (1934–1937) and head basketball coach (1925–1950) at Southwest Missouri State Normal School—now known as Missouri State University—in Springfield, Missouri.

McDonald was a two-sport athlete at the University of Kansas, starting at quarterback in football and playing basketball under head coach Phog Allen.

== Head coaching record ==
=== Football ===
Year	Team	Overall	Conference	Standing	Bowl/playoffs
Springfield Bears (Missouri Intercollegiate Athletic Association) (1934–1937)
1934	Springfield	1–5–1	1–3	4th	
1935	Springfield	3–4–1	2–2–1	T–3rd	
1936	Springfield	1–5–2	0–4–1	6th	
1937	Springfield	0–8–1	0–5	6th	
Springfield:		5–22–5	3–14–2		
Total:		5–22–5			

=== Basketball ===
Record table
Season	Team	Overall	Conference	Standing	Postseason
Springfield / Southwest Missouri State Bears (Missouri Intercollegiate Athletic Association) (1925–1950)
1925–26	Springfield	11–3	5–3	2nd	
1926–27	Springfield	11–10	5–7	4th	
1927–28	Springfield	18–4	9–3	1st	
1928–29	Springfield	16–6	10–6	2nd	
1929–30	Springfield	8–13	5–11	4th	
1930–31	Springfield	8–5	7–1	1st	
1931–32	Springfield	8–8	5–3	2nd	
1932–33	Springfield	9–6	4–4	T–2nd	
1933–34	Springfield	15–4	7–1	1st	
1934–35	Springfield	16–3	6–2	1st	
1935–36	Springfield	9–11	3–7	4th	
1936–37	Springfield	11–8	4–6	4th	
1937–38	Springfield	11–7	7–3	2nd	
1938–39	Springfield	15–6	7–3	2nd	
1939–40	Springfield	12–11	3–7	5th	
1940–41	Springfield	8–14	3–7	5th	
1941–42	Springfield	13–12	7–3	T–2nd	
1942–43	Southwest Missouri State	12–13			
1943–44	No team—World War II				
1944–45	No team—World War II				
1945–46	Southwest Missouri State	9–4			
1946–47	Southwest Missouri State	18–4	8–2	2nd	
1947–48	Southwest Missouri State	21–6	6–4	T–2nd	
1948–49	Southwest Missouri State	25–2	9–1	1st	
1949–50	Southwest Missouri State	19–5	8–2	1st	
Springfield / Southwest Missouri State:		302–166 (.645)	138–141 (.495)		
Total:		302–166 (.645)			
National champion Postseason invitational champion Conference regular season champion Conference regular season and conference tournament champion Division regular season champion Division regular season and conference tournament champion Conference tournament champion
