= Corliss Buchanan =

American sports coach (1889–1947)

Biographical details
- Born: July 26, 1889
- Died: December 10, 1947 (aged 58)

Playing career

Football
- 1909: Georgia Tech

Coaching career (HC unless noted)

Football
- 1910–1911: Missouri State

Basketball
- 1910–1911: Missouri State

Baseball
- 1911: Missouri State

Corliss Buchanan (July 26, 1889 – December 10, 1947) was an American football, basketball, and baseball coach. He served as the head football coach at Missouri State University (then known as Springfield Normal School) from 1910 to 1911. He was also the school's head basketball coach and head baseball coach. Buchanan played college football at Georgia Tech in 1909 under head coach John Heisman.
