= Don Cross =

American football player and coach (1925–2003)

Biographical details
- Born: January 26, 1925; Sesser, Illinois, U.S.
- Died: November 29, 2003 (aged 78); Kimberling City, Missouri, U.S.

Playing career
- 1947–1949: Southern Illinois

Coaching career (HC unless noted)
- 1951–1952: Caruthersville HS (MO)
- 1953–1959: Cairo HS (IL)
- 1960–1965: Southern Illinois (OL)
- 1966–1968: Illinois State (OL/DL)
- 1969–1975: Southwest Missouri State
- 1976–1981: Western Illinois (OL)

Administrative career (AD unless noted)
- 1953–1960: Cairo Unified School District 1

Head coaching record
- Overall: 23–45–3 (college)

Donald Ray "Red" Cross (January 26, 1925 – November 29, 2003) was an American football player and coach. He served as the head football coach at Southwest Missouri State University—now known as Missouri State University—in Springfield, Missouri from 1969 to 1975, compiling a record of 23–45–3.

== Head coaching record ==
=== College ===
Year	Team	Overall	Conference	Standing	Bowl/playoffs
Southwest Missouri State Bears (Missouri Intercollegiate Athletics Association) (1969–1976)
1969	Southwest Missouri State	0–10	0–5	6th	
1970	Southwest Missouri State	2–7–1	1–4–1	6th	
1971	Southwest Missouri State	1–8–1	1–4–1	7th	
1972	Southwest Missouri State	4–6	2–4	5th	
1973	Southwest Missouri State	3–7	3–3	T–3rd	
1974	Southwest Missouri State	7–3	4–2	T–3rd	
1975	Southwest Missouri State	6–4–1	3–3	T–3rd	
Southwest Missouri State:		23–45–3	14–25–2		
Total:		23–45–3			
