= Arthur W. Briggs =

American sports coach (1884–1949)

Biographical details
- Born: July 6, 1884; Salem, Massachusetts, U.S.
- Died: December 20, 1949 (aged 65)

Playing career

Football
- 1906: Springfield

Coaching career (HC unless noted)

Football
- 1912–1917: Springfield (MO)
- 1919–1933: Springfield (MO)

Basketball
- 1913–1918: Springfield (MO)
- 1919–1923: Springfield (MO)

Baseball
- 1914–1917: Springfield (MO)

Track
- 1913–1923: Springfield (MO)

Administrative career (AD unless noted)
- 1912–1938: Springfield (MO)

Accomplishments and honors

Awards
- Missouri State Bears No. C retired

Arthur W. Briggs (July 6, 1884 – December 20, 1949) was an American football, basketball, baseball and track and field coach. He served as the head football (1912–1917, 1919–1933), men's basketball (1913–1918, 1919–1923), baseball (1914–1917), and track coach at Missouri State University (then known as Southwest Missouri State College) in Springfield, Missouri.

Briggs played college football at Springfield College in Springfield, Massachusetts
