= 2025 Marshall Thundering Herd football team =

American college football season

2025 Marshall Thundering Herd football
- Conference: Sun Belt Conference
- East Division
- Record: 5–7 (3–5 Sun Belt)
- Head coach: Tony Gibson (1st season)
- Offensive coordinator: Rod Smith (1st season)
- Offensive scheme: Spread option
- Defensive coordinator: Shannon Morrison (1st season)
- Base defense: 3–3–5
- Home stadium: Joan C. Edwards Stadium

Uniform
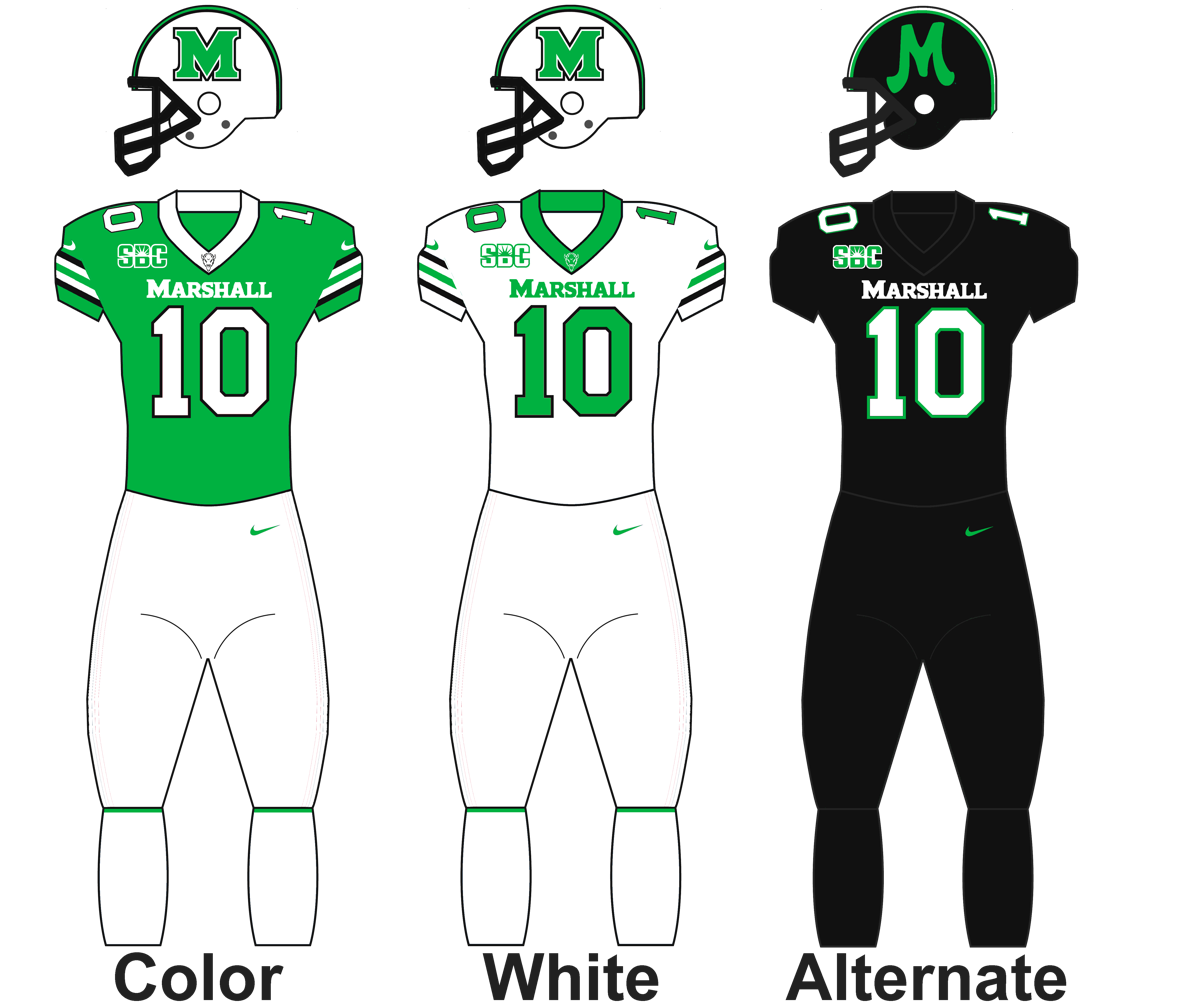

2025 Sun Belt Conference football standings
	Conf.			Overall
Team	W		L	W		L
East Division
No. 19 James Madison xy$^	8	–	0	12	–	2
Old Dominion	6	–	2	10	–	3
Coastal Carolina	5	–	3	6	–	7
Georgia Southern	4	–	4	7	–	6
Marshall	3	–	5	5	–	7
Appalachian State	2	–	6	5	–	8
Georgia State	0	–	8	1	–	11
West Division
Troy xy	6	–	2	8	–	6
Southern Miss	5	–	3	7	–	6
Louisiana	5	–	3	6	–	7
Arkansas State	5	–	3	7	–	6
Texas State	3	–	5	7	–	6
South Alabama	3	–	5	4	–	8
Louisiana–Monroe	1	–	7	3	–	9
Championship: James Madison 31, Troy 14
^ – College Football Playoff participant; $ – Conference champion; x – Division champion/co-champions; y – Championship game participant; Rankings from AP Poll

The 2025 Marshall Thundering Herd football team represented Marshall University in the Sun Belt Conference's East Division during the 2025 NCAA Division I FBS football season. The Thundering Herd were led by Tony Gibson in his first year as the head coach. The Thundering Herd played home games at the Joan C. Edwards Stadium, located in Huntington, West Virginia.

== Offseason ==
Following the departure of head coach Charles Huff to conference rival Southern Miss the day after the 2024 SBC championship game, 50 Thundering Herd players entered the transfer portal, with 21 of them eventually following Huff to Southern Miss. According to ESPN writer Bill Connelly, Marshall "is starting over [in 2025] like almost no one ever has"; between graduation and transfers:

- The quarterbacks responsible for all of Marshall's passing yardage in 2024 left.
- No returning Herd player rushed for a single yard in 2024.
- Only two returning players caught any passes in 2024.
- The players responsible for 49 of the 65 offensive line starts departed.
- Of the eight defensive linemen who played for at least 50 snaps in 2024, only one returned.
- Of the 13 defensive backs who played for at least 30 snaps in 2024, only two returned.
- The returning linebackers played a combined three snaps in 2024.

=== Transfers ===
==== Outgoing ====
Player	Position	Destination
Stone Earle	QB	Abilene Christian
DJ Stepney	S	Akron
Marcel Williams	WR	Akron
Colin Parachek	QB	Albany
Ian Ratliff	P	Appalachian State
Cade Davis	LS	Arizona State
AG McGhee	DB	Arkansas State
Treaden Henry	OL	Campbell
Robert Shockey	QB	Concord
Andrew Hancock	IOL	Elon
Su Agunloye	DL	FIU
Leon Hart Jr.	LB	Florida Atlantic
Cole Pennington	QB	Gardner–Webb
Landyn Watson	LB	Kentucky
A.J. Turner	RB	Minnesota
Kam Kynard	S	Mississippi Gulf Coast
Antwaan Mays	WR	Mississippi Gulf Coast
Rece Verhoff	K	North Carolina
Thomas McCoy	WR	Northern Illinois
Christian Fitzpatrick	WR	Oklahoma State
Jaden Yates	LB	Ole Miss
Justin Holmes	TE	Pittsburgh
Aidan Steinfeldt	TE	Richmond
Jacobie Henderson	DB	Rutgers
Guylijah Theodule	DB	Southern Miss
Braylon Braxton	QB	Southern Miss
Alec Clark	P	Southern Miss
Isaiah Gibson Sr.	DL	Southern Miss
Ian Foster	S	Southern Miss
J.J. Hawkins	DE	Southern Miss
Josh Moten	DB	Southern Miss
Elijah Metcalf	WR	Southern Miss
Chuck Montgomery	WR	Southern Miss
Ishmael Ibraheem	DB	Southern Miss
Bralon Brown	WR	Southern Miss
Ahmere Foster	S	Southern Miss
Jabari Ishmael	DE	Southern Miss
Tychaun Chapman	WR	Southern Miss
Corey Myrick	S	Southern Miss
MaLik Caswell	S	Southern Miss
Carl Chester	WR	Southern Miss
Mathis Haygood	LB	Southern Miss
Moses Gray	RB	Southern Miss
Anthony Richard	DB	Southern Miss
Chris Stokes	DL	Southern Miss
Chris Thomas Jr.	DL	Syracuse
Brock Montgomery	WR	Tennessee State
Ashton Heflin	LB	Texas State
Cedrick Nicely	OL	West Georgia
Cade Conley	TE	Western Michigan
Will Petit	P	Unknown
Isaiah Johnson	S	Unknown
Jadarius Green-McKnight	S	Withdrawn
TaShawn Jeter	DB	Withdrawn

==== Incoming ====
Player	Position	Previous school
Adrian Norton	WR	Akron
Zavier Short	WR	Appalachian State
Justin Williams-Thomas	RB	California
Rashawn Carr	LB	Campbell
Paul Hutson III	EDGE	Campbell
Louikenzy Jules	DB	Charleston
KaTron Evans	DL	Charlotte
Peyton Ellis	OL	East Texas A&M
Evan Ferguson	IOL	Gardner–Webb
Tyler McDuffie	OT	Hampton
Tony Mathis	RB	Houston
Atley Cowan	QB	Indianapolis
Tyas Martin	DL	Jackson State
Cam Smith	S	Jackson State
Zion Turner	QB	Jacksonville State
Jibreel Al-Amin	LB	Jacksonville State
Demarcus Lacey	WR	Jacksonville State
Tayvon Nelson	DB	Maryland
Jo'shon Barbie	RB	McNeese
Philipp Davis	CB	Michigan State
Marvae Myers	DB	Middle Tennessee
Morgan Scott	OT	Middle Tennessee
Javae Gilmore	LB	Mississippi State
Antonio Harmon	WR	Mississippi State
Zane Porter	LB	Morehead State
Trey Dunn	QB	Navy
Jakolbe Baldwin	WR	NC State
Jayland Parker	LB	NC State
Cannon Lewis	LB	NC State
Robert Shockey	QB	NC State
Al Ashford III	CB	Northern Arizona
Peter Schuh	S	Oklahoma
Brock Walters	LS	Old Dominion
Naquan Crowder	DL	PennWest California
Ali Abbasi	DL	Roosevelt
Jamaal Whyce	DL	South Carolina
Jack Clougherty	QB	South Dakota
Carlos Del Rio-Wilson	QB	Syracuse
Darrell Sweeting	DB	Temple
Joseph Auzenne	DL	Temple
Boogie Trotter	S	Tennessee State
Ian Ratliff	P	Texas
Daniel Harris	S	UAB
Brock Montgomery	WR	UConn
Michael Allen	RB	UNLV
Ma'jon Wright	WR	Valdosta State
Xayvion Turner-Bradshaw	WR	Virginia Tech
Joshua Pierre-Louis	CB	West Georgia
Ben Turner	WR	West Liberty
Bryce Biggs	OL	West Virginia
Sammy Etienne	S	West Virginia
Zah Jackson	CB	West Virginia
Jalil Rivera-Harvey	DL	Western Kentucky
Sid Kaba	DL	Western Michigan
Tony Martin	WR	Western Michigan
Jalen Marshall	LB	Wofford
Kerion Martin	S	Youngstown State

=== Coaching staff additions ===
Name	New Position	Previous Team	Previous Position	Source
Tony Gibson	Head coach	NC State	Defensive coordinator/Linebackers	
Rod Smith	Offensive coordinator/Quarterbacks	Jacksonville State	Interim head coach	
Shannon Morrison	Defensive coordinator	Marshall (Note: Left Marshall after the 2023 season, did not coach in 2024)	Linebackers	
Jackson White	Special teams	NC State	Special teams quality control	
Rod McDowell	Running backs/Run game coordinator	Jacksonville State	Running backs	
Bob McClain	Offensive line	California (PA)	Offensive line/Run game coordinator	
Gunter Brewer	Tight ends	Virginia Tech	Director of High School Relations	
Jake Ellsworth	Linebackers	NC State	Defensive director of quality control	
Jarred Holley	Defensive backs	Abilene Christian	Safeties	

== Preseason ==
=== Media poll ===
In the Sun Belt preseason coaches' poll, the Thundering Herd were picked to finish sixth place in the East division.

Tight end Toby Payne was named to the preseason All-Sun Belt first team offense. Offensive lineman Jalen Slappy was named to the second team offense.

== Schedule ==
Date	Time	Opponent	Site	TV	Result	Attendance
August 30	3:30 p.m.	at No. 5 Georgia*	Sanford Stadium; Athens, GA	ESPN	L 7–45	93,033
September 6	6:00 p.m.	Missouri State*	Joan C. Edwards Stadium; Huntington, WV	ESPN+	L 20–21	28,564
September 13	6:00 p.m.	Eastern Kentucky*	Joan C. Edwards Stadium; Huntington, WV	ESPN+	W 38–7	23,925
September 20	7:00 p.m.	at Middle Tennessee*	Johnny "Red" Floyd Stadium; Murfreesboro, TN	ESPN+	W 42–28	15,168
September 27	8:00 p.m.	at Louisiana	Cajun Field; Lafayette, LA	ESPN+	L 51–54 ^{2OT}	20,125
October 11	3:30 p.m.	Old Dominion	Joan C. Edwards Stadium; Huntington, WV	ESPN+	W 48–24	23,515
October 18	3:30 p.m.	Texas State^{†}	Joan C. Edwards Stadium; Huntington, WV	ESPN+	W 40–37 ^{2OT}	27,533
October 30	7:30 p.m.	at Coastal Carolina	Brooks Stadium; Conway, SC	ESPN2	L 27–44	17,034
November 8	12:00 p.m.	James Madison	Joan C. Edwards Stadium; Huntington, WV	ESPN2	L 23–35	26,727
November 15	2:00 p.m.	at Georgia State	Center Parc Stadium; Atlanta, GA	ESPN+	W 30–18	12,871
November 22	2:30 p.m.	at Appalachian State	Kidd Brewer Stadium; Boone, NC (rivalry)	ESPN+	L 24–26	31,322
November 29	1:30 p.m.	Georgia Southern	Joan C. Edwards Stadium; Huntington, WV	ESPN+	L 19–24	21,524
*Non-conference game; ^{†}Homecoming; Rankings from AP Poll and CFP Rankings released prior to game; All times are in Eastern time

== Game summaries ==
=== at No. 5 Georgia ===
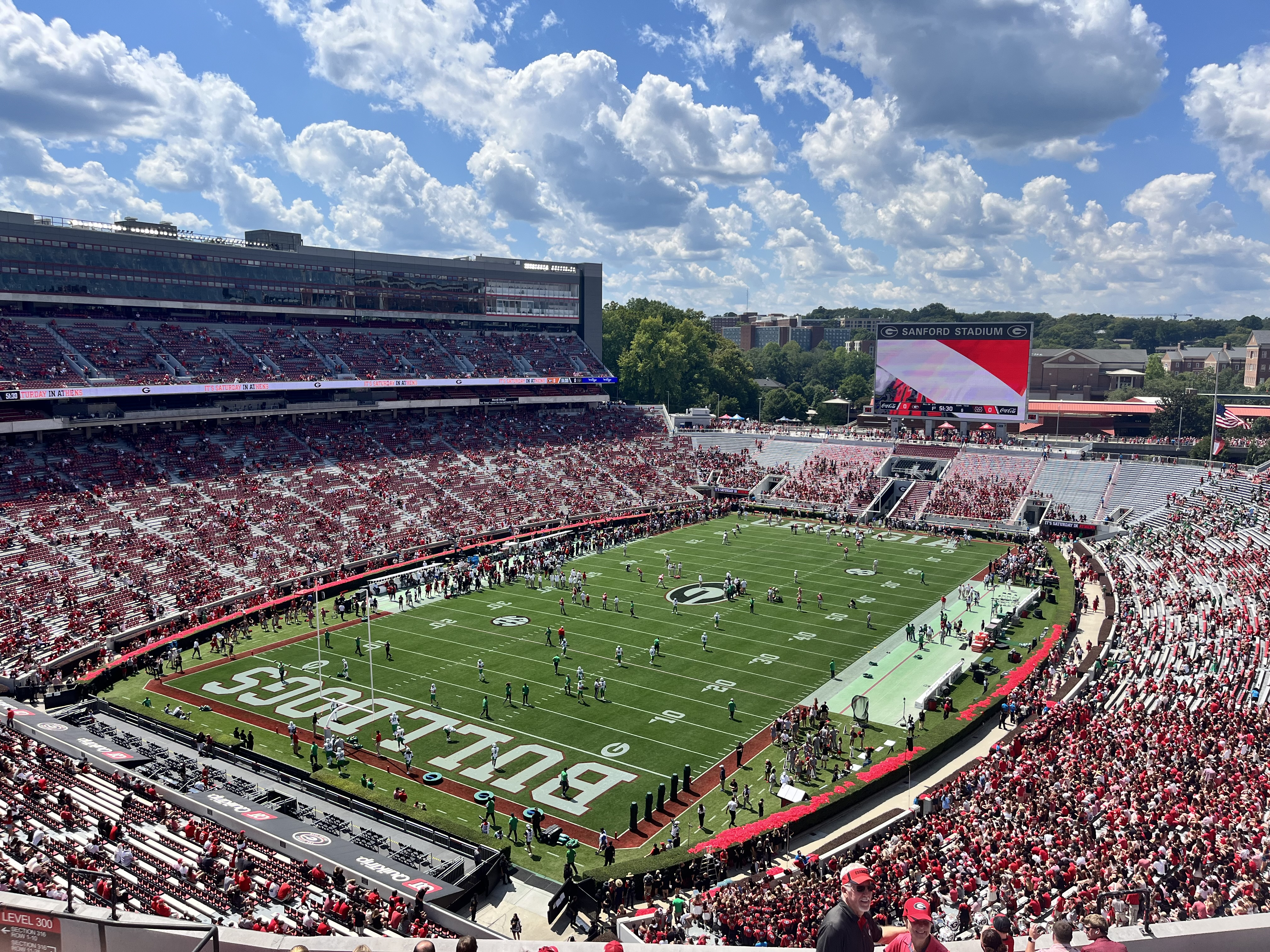
Marshall vs. Georgia on August 30, 2025 at Sanford Stadium

Game One – Marshall Thundering Herd (0–0) at No. 5 Georgia Bulldogs (0–0) – Game summary

Quarter	1	2	3	4	Total
Thundering Herd	0	0	0	7	7
No. 5 Bulldogs	14	10	14	7	45

at Sanford Stadium • Athens, Georgia

- Date: Saturday, August 30, 2025
- Game time: 3:30 p.m.
- Game weather: Sunny • Temperature: 83 °F (28 °C) • Wind: E 5 mph
- Game attendance: 93,033
- Referee: Lee Hendrick
- TV announcers (ESPN): Mike Monaco (play-by-play), Kirk Morrison (analyst), and Dawn Davenport (sideline)

Game information

First quarter

- (9:22) UGA – Dwight Phillips Jr. 17-yard run, Peyton Woodring kick (Drive: 8 plays, 70 yards, 4:17; Georgia 7–0)
- (2:21) UGA – Gunner Stockton 13-yard run, Peyton Woodring kick (Drive: 11 plays, 72 yards, 5:13; Georgia 14–0)

Second quarter

- (9:07) UGA – Gunner Stockton 11-yard run, Peyton Woodring kick (Drive: 3 plays, 20 yards, 1:08; Georgia 21–0)
- (0:24) UGA – Peyton Woodring 43-yard field goal (Drive: 9 plays, 44 yards, 1:03; Georgia 24–0)

Third quarter

- (13:13) UGA – Zachariah Branch 47-yard pass from Gunner Stockton, Peyton Woodring kick (Drive: 4 plays, 75 yards, 1:47; Georgia 31–0)
- (3:51) UGA – London Humphreys 2-yard pass from Gunner Stockton, Peyton Woodring kick (Drive: 8 plays, 55 yards, 4:23; Georgia 38–0)

Fourth quarter

- (14:18) UGA – Elyiss Williams 23-yard pass from Ryan Puglisi, Peyton Woodring kick (Drive: 8 plays, 80 yards, 3:23; Georgia 45–0)
- (10:27) MRSH – Jo'Shon Barbie 1-yard run, Lorcan Quinn kick (Drive: 7 plays, 84 yards, 3:46; Georgia 45–7)

Statistics	MRSH	UGA
First downs	7	27
Plays–yards	52–207	76–488
Rushes–yards	31–78	44–239
Passing yards	129	249
Passing: Comp–Att–Int	11–21–0	19–32–0
Turnovers	0	0
Time of possession	25:31	34:29

Team	Category	Player	Statistics
Marshall	Passing	Zion Turner	6/7, 100 yards
Marshall	Rushing	Justin Williams-Thomas	4 carries, 24 yards
Marshall	Receiving	Xayvion Turner-Bradshaw	3 receptions, 58 yards
Georgia	Passing	Gunner Stockton	14/24, 190 yards, 2 TD
Georgia	Rushing	Gunner Stockton	10 carries, 73 yards, 2 TD
Georgia	Receiving	Zachariah Branch	3 receptions, 95 yards, TD

=== vs Missouri State ===
Game Two – Missouri State Bears (0–1) at Marshall Thundering Herd (0–1) – Game summary

Quarter	1	2	3	4	Total
Bears	0	7	7	7	21
Thundering Herd	0	17	3	0	20

at Joan C. Edwards Stadium • Huntington, West Virginia

- Date: Saturday, September 6, 2025
- Game time: 6:00 p.m.
- Game weather: Rain
- Game attendance: 28,564
- Referee: Brandon Kirkland
- TV announcers (ESPN+): Keith Morehouse (play-by-play) and Mark Martin (analyst)

Game information

First quarter

- No scoring plays.

Second quarter

- (13:57) MOST – Ramone Green Jr. 57-yard pass from Jacob Clark, Yousef Obeid kick (Drive: 8 plays, 88 yards, 3:08; Missouri State 7–0)
- (11:07) MRSH – Zion Turner 14-yard run, Lorcan Quinn kick (Drive: 7 plays, 75 yards, 2:50; Tied 7–7)
- (3:36) MRSH – Justin Williams-Thomas 37-yard run, Lorcan Quinn kick (Drive: 10 plays, 76 yards, 4:43; Marshall 14–7)
- (0:44) MRSH – Lorcan Quinn 50-yard field goal (Drive: 4 plays, 4 yards, 0:54; Marshall 17–7)

Third quarter

- (9:08) MRSH – Lorcan Quinn 33-yard field goal (Drive: 4 plays, 4 yards, 2:04; Marshall 20–7)
- (7:59) MOST – Jmariyae Robinson 52-yard pass from Jacob Clark, Yousef Obeid kick (Drive: 3 plays, 74 yards, 1:03; Marshall 20–14)

Fourth quarter

- (2:12) MOST – Jaron Askren 8-yard pass from Jacob Clark, Yousef Obeid kick (Drive: 9 plays, 80 yards, 5:25; Missouri State 21–20)

Statistics	MOST	MRSH
First downs	18	12
Plays–yards	70–474	57–274
Rushes–yards	38–86	33–191
Passing yards	388	83
Passing: Comp–Att–Int	22–32–1	13–24–1
Turnovers	1	1
Time of possession	34:34	25:26

Team	Category	Player	Statistics
Missouri State	Passing	Jacob Clark	21/31, 359 yards, 3 TD, INT
Missouri State	Rushing	Shomari Lawrence	17 carries, 49 yards
Missouri State	Receiving	Ramone Green Jr.	4 receptions, 123 yards, TD
Marshall	Passing	Zion Turner	13/24, 83 yards, INT
Marshall	Rushing	Jo'Shon Barbe	12 carries, 67 yards
Marshall	Receiving	Toby Payne	4 receptions, 43 yards

=== vs Eastern Kentucky ===
Game Three – Eastern Kentucky Colonels (FCS) (1–1) at Marshall Thundering Herd (0–2) – Game summary

Quarter	1	2	3	4	Total
Colonels (FCS)	0	0	7	0	7
Thundering Herd	17	14	7	0	38

at Joan C. Edwards Stadium • Huntington, West Virginia

- Date: Saturday, September 13, 2025
- Game time: 6:00 p.m.
- Game weather: Sunny
- Game attendance: 23,925
- Referee: Marshall Lewis
- TV announcers (ESPN+): Keith Morehouse (play-by-play), Mark Martin (analyst) and Ben Westfall (sideline)

Game information

First quarter

- (8:13) MRSH – Lorcan Quinn 19-yard field goal (Drive: 5 plays, 17 yards, 2:21; Marshall 3–0)
- (5:01) MRSH – Carlos Del Rio-Wilson 4-yard run, Lorcan Quinn kick (Drive: 3 plays, 21 yards, 1:05; Marshall 10–0)
- (0:25) MRSH – Justin Williams-Thomas 3-yard run, Lorcan Quinn kick (Drive: 7 plays, 56 yards, 3:15; Marshall 17–0)

Second quarter

- (12:03) MRSH – Justin Williams-Thomas 30 yard pass from Carlos Del Rio-Wilson, Lorcan Quinn kick (Drive: 3 plays, 35 yards, 1:30; Marshall 24–0)
- (0:08) MRSH – Adrian Norton 30-yard pass from Carlos Del Rio-Wilson, Lorcan Quinn kick (Drive: 7 plays, 53 yards, 1:49; Marshall 31–0)

Third quarter

- (13:08) EKU – Jayden West 13-yard pass from Jordyn Potts, Buzz Fabiano kick (Drive: 3 plays, 14 yards, 1:03; Marshall 31–7)
- (8:01) MRSH – JacQai Long 3-yard run, Lorcan Quinn kick (Drive: 5 plays, 63 yards, 2:06; Marshall 38–7)

Fourth quarter

- No scoring plays.

Statistics	EKU	MRSH
First downs	10	21
Plays–yards	52–102	71–377
Rushes–yards	28–11	57–263
Passing yards	91	114
Passing: Comp–Att–Int	8–24–2	8–14–0
Turnovers	2	2
Time of possession	25:56	34:04

Team	Category	Player	Statistics
Eastern Kentucky	Passing	Jordyn Potts	7/19, 78 yards, TD
Eastern Kentucky	Rushing	Brayden Latham	10 carries, 18 yards
Eastern Kentucky	Receiving	T. J. Mitchell	1 reception, 36 yards
Marshall	Passing	Carlos Del Rio-Wilson	7/9, 108 yards, 2 TD
Marshall	Rushing	Carlos Del Rio-Wilson	13 carries, 58 yards, TD
Marshall	Receiving	Justin Williams-Thomas	3 receptions, 41 yards, TD

=== at Middle Tennessee ===
Game Four – Marshall Thundering Herd (1–2) at Middle Tennessee Blue Raiders (1–2) – Game summary

Quarter	1	2	3	4	Total
Thundering Herd	21	0	0	21	42
Blue Raiders	14	6	8	0	28

at Johnny "Red" Floyd Stadium • Murfreesboro, Tennessee

- Date: Saturday, September 20, 2025
- Game time: 7:00 p.m. EDT
- Game weather: Cloudy • Temperature: 83 °F (28 °C) • Wind: S 3 mph
- Game attendance: 15,168
- Referee: Trennis Livingston
- TV announcers (ESPN+): Jake Rose (play-by-play), Jeremy Kellem (analyst) and Justin Beasley (sideline)

Game information

First quarter

- (8:47) MRSH – Toby Payne 3-yard pass from Carlos Del Rio-Wilson, Lorcan Quinn kick (Drive: 7 plays, 40 yards, 3:15; Marshall 7–0)
- (7:57) MTSU – Nazhae Cox 3-yard pass from Nicholas Vattiato, Jacob Hathaway kick (Drive: 2 plays, 75 yards, 0:50; Tied 7–7)
- (6:51) MRSH – Demarcus Lacey 68-yard pass from Carlos Del Rio-Wilson, Lorcan Quinn kick (Drive: 3 plays, 75 yards, 1:06; Marshall 14–7)
- (6:03) MTSU – Amorion Walker 41-yard pass from Nicholas Vattiato, Jacob Hathaway kick (Drive: 2 plays, 75 yards, 0:48; Tied 14–14)
- (1:05) MRSH – Carlos Del Rio-Wilson 2-yard run, Lorcan Quinn kick (Drive: 9 plays, 75 yards, 4:58; Marshall 21–14)

Second quarter

- (9:36) MTSU – Jacob Hathaway 50-yard field goal (Drive: 7 plays, 49 yards, 2:46; Marshall 21–17)
- (1:37) MTSU – Jacob Hathaway 38-yard field goal (Drive: 11 plays, 45 yards, 5:06; Marshall 21–20)

Third quarter

- (5:54) MTSU – Nicholas Vattiato 3-yard run, Hunter Tipton pass from Nicholas Vattiato (Drive: 5 plays, 67 yards, 2:29; Middle Tennessee 28–21)

Fourth quarter

- (14:54) MRSH – Toby Payne 4-yard pass from Carlos Del Rio-Wilson, Lorcan Quinn kick (Drive: 12 plays, 65 yards, 6:00; Tied 28–28)
- (8:47) MRSH – De'Andre Tamarez 24-yard pass from Carlos Del Rio-Wilson, Lorcan Quinn kick (Drive: 7 plays, 56 yards, 3:05; Marshall 35–28)
- (4:38) MRSH – Michael Allen 11-yard run, Lorcan Quinn kick (Drive: 6 plays, 67 yards, 3:48; Marshall 42–28)

Statistics	MRSH	MTSU
First downs	27	14
Plays–yards	71–449	48–373
Rushes–yards	49–188	15–74
Passing yards	261	299
Passing: Comp–Att–Int	18–22–0	19–33–1
Turnovers	1	1
Time of possession	36:47	22:13

Team	Category	Player	Statistics
Marshall	Passing	Carlos Del Rio-Wilson	18/22, 261 yards, 4 TD
Marshall	Rushing	Michael Allen	21 carries, 90 yards, TD
Marshall	Receiving	Demarcus Lacey	5 receptions, 116 yards, TD
Middle Tennessee	Passing	Nicholas Vattiato	19/32, 299 yards, 2 TD, INT
Middle Tennessee	Rushing	Jekail Middlebrook	6 carries, 89 yards
Middle Tennessee	Receiving	Nahzae Cox	6 receptions, 94 yards, TD

=== at Louisiana ===
Game Five – Marshall Thundering Herd (2–2) at Louisiana Ragin' Cajuns (1–3) – Game summary

Quarter	1	2	3	4	OT	2OT	Total
Thundering Herd	3	14	17	7	7	3	51
Ragin' Cajuns	3	14	3	21	7	6	54

at Cajun Field • Lafayette, Louisiana

- Date: Saturday, September 27, 2025
- Game time: 8:00 p.m.
- Game weather: Sunny
- Game attendance: 20,125
- Referee: Ted Pitts
- TV announcers (ESPN+): Dan McDonald (play-by-play), Eric Mouton (analyst) and Ben Schafer (sideline)

Game information

First quarter

- (9:52) MRSH – Lorcan Quinn 53-yard field goal (Drive: 5 plays, 16 yards, 4:38; Marshall 3–0)
- (6:46) LA – Tony Sterner 26-yard field goal (Drive: 9 plays, 29 yards, 6:52; Tied 3–3)

Second quarter

- (10:51) MRSH – Michael Allen 9-yard run, Lorcan Quinn kick (Drive: 11 plays, 56 yards, 5:09; Marshall 10–3)
- (6:41) LA – Zylan Perry 19-yard run, Tony Sterner kick (Drive: 8 plays, 75 yards, 4:10; Tied 10–10)
- (1:43) LA – Lunch Winfield 6-yard run, Tony Sterner kick (Drive: 9 plays, 64 yards, 3:43; Louisiana 17–10)
- (0:23) MRSH – Demarcus Lacey 32-yard pass from Carlos Del Rio-Wilson, Lorcan Quinn kick (Drive: 8 plays, 75 yards, 1:20; Tied 17–17)

Third quarter

- (14:20) MRSH – Michael Allen 68-yard run, Lorcan Quinn kick (Drive: 2 plays, 70 yards, 0:35; Marshall 24–17)
- (11:11) MRSH – Paul Hutson III 46-yard interception return, Lorcan Quinn kick (Marshall 31–17)
- (6:55) MRSH – Lorcan Quinn 30-yard field goal (Drive: 8 plays, 28 yards, 3:35; Marshall 34–17)
- (1:32) LA – Tony Sterner 35-yard field goal (Drive: 11 plays, 57 yards, 5:23; Marshall 34–20)

Fourth quarter

- (10:16) LA – Lunch Winfield 2-yard run, Tony Sterner kick (Drive: 6 plays, 65 yards, 3:03; Marshall 34–27)
- (4:27) LA – Charles Robertson 45-yard pass from Lunch Winfield, Tony Sterner kick (Drive: 6 plays, 81 yards, 2:34; Tied 34–34)
- (1:01) MRSH – Demarcus Lacey 27-yard pass from Carlos Del Rio-Wilson, Lorcan Quinn kick (Drive: 7 plays, 71 yards, 3:17; Marshall 41–34)
- (0:16) LA – Dale Martin 24-yard pass from Lunch Winfield, Tony Sterner kick (Drive: 7 plays, 75 yards, 0:45; Tied 41–41)

First overtime

- LA – Zylan Perry 25-yard run, Tony Sterner kick (Drive: 1 play, 25 yards; Louisiana 48–41)
- MRSH – Adrian Norton 3-yard pass from Carlos Del Rio-Wilson, Lorcan Quinn kick (Drive: 6 plays, 25 yards; Tied 48–48)

Second overtime

- MRSH – Lorcan Quinn 46-yard field goal (Drive: 4 plays, –3 yards; Marshall 51–48)
- LA – Lunch Winfield 10-yard run (Drive: 5 play, 25 yards; Louisiana 54–51)

Statistics	MRSH	LA
First downs	27	29
Plays–yards	79–503	74–461
Rushes–yards	48–245	46–264
Passing yards	258	197
Passing: Comp–Att–Int	24–31–0	14–28–2
Turnovers	1	2
Time of possession	30:28	29:32

Team	Category	Player	Statistics
Marshall	Passing	Carlos Del Rio-Wilson	24/31, 258 yards, 3 TD
Marshall	Rushing	Michael Allen	19 carries, 138 yards, 2 TD
Marshall	Receiving	Demarcus Lacey	10 receptions, 146 yards, 2 TD
Louisiana	Passing	Lunch Winfield	7/13, 125 yards, 2 TD
Louisiana	Rushing	Lunch Winfield	13 carries, 129 yards, 3 TD
Louisiana	Receiving	Charles Robertson	2 reception, 61 yards, TD

=== vs Old Dominion ===
Game Six – Old Dominion Monarchs (4–1) at Marshall Thundering Herd (2–3) – Game summary

Quarter	1	2	3	4	Total
Monarchs	7	3	0	14	24
Thundering Herd	7	17	17	7	48

at Joan C. Edwards Stadium • Huntington, West Virginia

- Date: Saturday, October 11, 2025
- Game time: 3:30 p.m. EDT
- Game weather: Sunny
- Game attendance: 23,515
- Referee: Scott Broadway
- TV announcers (ESPN+): Keith Morehouse (play-by-play), Mark Martin (analyst) and Ben Westfall (sideline)

Game information

First quarter

- (4:57) MRSH – Boogie Trotter 22-yard interception return, Lorcan Quinn kick (Marshall 7–0)
- (0:47) ODU – Tre Brown 71-yard pass from Colton Joseph, Riley Callaghan kick (Drive: 3 plays, 66 yards, 1:11; Tied 7–7)

Second quarter

- (13:52) MRSH – Michael Allen 49-yard pass from Carlos Del Rio-Wilson, Lorcan Quinn kick (Drive: 5 plays, 75 yards, 1:55; Marshall 14–7)
- (3:10) MRSH – Lorcan Quinn 20-yard field goal (Drive: 11 plays, 54 yards, 5:08; Marshall 17–7)
- (1:23) MRSH – Carlos Del Rio-Wilson 6-yard run, Lorcan Quinn kick (Drive: 3 plays, 39 yards, 1:01; Marshall 24–7)
- (0:24) ODU – Riley Callaghan 42-yard field goal (Drive: 8 plays, 51 yards, 0:59; Marshall 24–10)

Third quarter

- (8:45) MRSH – Antwan Roberts 26-yard run, Lorcan Quinn kick (Drive: 2 plays, 28 yards, 0:36; Marshall 31–10)
- (5:47) MRSH – Demarcus Lacey 15-yard pass from Carlos Del Rio-Wilson, Lorcan Quinn kick (Drive: 5 plays, 65 yards, 2:06; Marshall 38–10)
- (2:11) MRSH – Lorcan Quinn 46-yard field goal (Drive: 4 plays, 6 yards, 2:32; Marshall 41–10)

Fourth quarter

- (9:07) MRSH – Carlos Del Rio-Wilson 2-yard run, Lorcan Quinn kick (Drive: 5 plays, 22 yards, 2:52; Marshall 48–10)
- (6:56) ODU – Colton Joseph 4-yard run, Riley Callaghan kick (Drive: 8 plays, 75 yards, 2:11; Marshall 48–17)
- (0:48) ODU – Maurki James 1-yard run, Riley Callaghan kick (Drive: 14 plays, 80 yards, 3:57; Marshall 48–24)

Statistics	ODU	MRSH
First downs	15	22
Plays–yards	66–439	76–445
Rushes–yards	38–173	50–223
Passing yards	266	222
Passing: Comp–Att–Int	15–28–2	18–26–0
Turnovers	5	0
Time of possession	23:25	36:35

Team	Category	Player	Statistics
Old Dominion	Passing	Colton Joseph	15/28, 266 yards, TD, 2 INT
Old Dominion	Rushing	Maurki James	12 carries, 83 yards, TD
Old Dominion	Receiving	Tre Brown	1 reception, 71 yards, TD
Marshall	Passing	Carlos Del Rio-Wilson	17/24, 219 yards, 2 TD
Marshall	Rushing	Carlos Del Rio-Wilson	17 carries, 95 yards, 2 TD
Marshall	Receiving	Demarcus Lacey	8 receptions, 121 yards, TD

=== vs Texas State ===
Game Seven – Texas State Bobcats (3–3) at Marshall Thundering Herd (3–3) – Game summary

Quarter	1	2	3	4	OT	2OT	Total
Bobcats	7	10	0	10	7	3	37
Thundering Herd	7	6	3	11	7	6	40

at Joan C. Edwards Stadium • Huntington, West Virginia

- Date: Saturday, October 18, 2025
- Game time: 3:30 p.m. EDT
- Game weather: Sunny
- Game attendance: 27,533
- Referee: Tim Barker
- TV announcers (ESPN+): Keith Morehouse (play-by-play), Mark Martin (analyst) and Ben Westfall (sideline)

Game information

First quarter

- (14:31) TXST – Brad Jackson 1-yard run, Tyler Robles kick (Drive: 4 plays, 75 yards, 0:29; Texas State 7–0)
- (10:01) MRSH – Antwan Roberts 5-yard run, Lorcan Quinn kick (Drive: 3 plays, 14 yards, 1:07; Tied 7–7)

Second quarter

- (14:15) MRSH – Lorcan Quinn 24-yard field goal (Drive: 7 plays, 60 yards, 3:26; Marshall 10–7)
- (7:55) TXST – Tyler Robles 23-yard field goal (Drive: 7 plays, 76 yards, 2:38; Tied 10–10)
- (3:42) MRSH – Lorcan Quinn 48-yard field goal (Drive: 10 plays, 39 yards, 4:13; Marshall 13–10)
- (1:22) TXST – Titis Lyons 2-yard pass from Brad Jackson, Tyler Robles kick (Drive: 5 plays, 76 yards, 2:20; Texas State 17–13)

Third quarter

- (0:39) MRSH – Lorcan Quinn 31-yard field goal (Drive: 7 plays, 67 yards, 3:01; Texas State 17–16)

Fourth quarter

- (14:45) TXST – Beau Sparks 73-yard pass from Brad Jackson, Tyler Robles kick (Drive: 3 plays, 75 yards, 0:54; Texas State 24–16)
- (6:08) MRSH – Lorcan Quinn 23-yard field goal (Drive: 7 plays, 26 yards, 2:45; Texas State 24–19)
- (1:14) MRSH – Adrian Norton 21-yard pass from Carlos Del Rio-Wilson, Demarcus Lacey run (Drive: 5 plays, 53 yards, 0:59; Marshall 27–24)
- (0:00) TXST – Tyler Robles 50-yard field goal (Drive: 11 plays, 43 yards, 1:14; Tied 27–27)

First overtime

- MRSH – Jo'Shon Barbie 4-yard run, Lorcan Quinn kick (Drive: 4 plays, 25 yards; Marshall 34–27)
- TXST – Lincoln Pare 1-yard run, Tyler Robles kick (Drive: 7 plays, 25 yards; Tied 34–34)

Second overtime

- TXST – Tyler Robles 29-yard field goal (Drive: 7 plays, 14 yards; Texas State 37–34)
- MRSH – Jo'Shon Barbie 1-yard run (Drive: 7 plays, 25 yards; Marshall 40–37)

Statistics	TXST	MRSH
First downs	20	27
Plays–yards	83–558	81–466
Rushes–yards	44–114	48–186
Passing yards	444	280
Passing: Comp–Att–Int	26–39–1	23–33–1
Turnovers	3	1
Time of possession	27:17	32:43

Team	Category	Player	Statistics
Texas State	Passing	Brad Jackson	26/38, 444 yards, 2 TD, INT
Texas State	Rushing	Brad Jackson	19 carries, 48 yards, TD
Texas State	Receiving	Chris Dawn Jr.	5 reception, 180 yards
Marshall	Passing	Carlos Del Rio-Wilson	22/32, 277 yards, TD, INT
Marshall	Rushing	Carlos Del Rio-Wilson	17 carries, 88 yards
Marshall	Receiving	Demarcus Lacey	7 receptions, 88 yards

=== at Coastal Carolina ===
Game Eight – Marshall Thundering Herd (4–3) at Coastal Carolina Chanticleers (4–3) – Game summary

Quarter	1	2	3	4	Total
Thundering Herd	10	10	7	0	27
Chanticleers	3	14	20	7	44

at Brooks Stadium • Conway, South Carolina

- Date: Thursday, October 30, 2025
- Game time: 7:30 PM EDT
- Game weather: Cloudy • Temperature: 58 °F (14 °C) • Wind: E 10 mph
- Game attendance: 17,034
- Referee: Ted Pitts
- TV announcers (ESPN2): Dave Neal (play-by-play) and Fozzy Whittaker (analyst)

Game information

First quarter

- (13:08) MRSH – Boogie Trotter 51-yard interception return, Lorcan Quinn kick (Marshall 7–0)
- (9:55) CCU – Kian Afrookhteh 36-yard field goal (Drive: 8 plays, 56 yards, 3:13; Marshall 7–3)
- (5:27) MRSH – Lorcan Quinn 55-yard field goal (Drive: 4 plays, –1 yard, 0:50; Marshall 10–3)

Second quarter

- (14:14) MRSH – Lorcan Quinn 23-yard field goal (Drive: 11 plays, 49 yards, 4:47; Marshall 13–3)
- (10:12) CCU – Samari Collier 2-yard run, Kian Afrookhteh kick (Drive: 8 plays, 54 yards, 3:53; Marshall 13–10)
- (6:49) MRSH – Jo'Shon Barbie 4-yard run, Lorcan Quinn kick (Drive: 8 plays, 65 yards, 3:23; Marshall 20–10)
- (5:33) CCU – Dominic Knicely 59-yard run, Kian Afrookhteh kick (Drive: 4 plays, 75 yards, 1:16; Marshall 20–17)

Third quarter

- (12:46) MRSH – De'Andre Tamarez 7-yard pass from Carlos Del Rio-Wilson, Lorcan Quinn kick (Drive: 7 plays, 75 yards, 2:14; Marshall 27–17)
- (11:26) CCU – Malcolm Gillie 69-yard pass from Samari Collier, Kian Afrookhteh kick (Drive: 3 plays, 75 yards, 1:20; Marshall 27–24)
- (10:44) CCU – Bryson Graves 17-yard pass from Samari Collier, Kian Afrookhteh kick (Drive: 2 plays, 18 yards, 0:32; Coastal Carolina 31–27)
- (7:56) CCU – Kian Afrookhteh 42-yard field goal (Drive: 4 plays, 3 yards, 1:29; Coastal Carolina 34–27)
- (3:21) CCU – Kian Afrookhteh 24-yard field goal (Drive: 8 plays, 32 yards, 3:54; Coastal Carolina 37–27)

Fourth quarter

- (8:08) CCU – Samari Collier 1-yard run, Kian Afrookhteh kick (Drive: 3 plays, 40 yards, 1:00; Coastal Carolina 44–27)

Statistics	MRSH	CCU
First downs	22	16
Plays–yards	81–432	66–410
Rushes–yards	45–279	45–214
Passing yards	153	196
Passing: Comp–Att–Int	21–36–2	8–21–1
Turnovers	5	2
Time of possession	31:33	28:27

Team	Category	Player	Statistics
Marshall	Passing	Carlos Del Rio-Wilson	21/36, 153 yards, TD, 2 INT
Marshall	Rushing	Antwan Roberts	15 carries, 134 yards
Marshall	Receiving	De'Andre Tamarez	5 receptions, 45 yards, TD
Coastal Carolina	Passing	Samari Collier	8/20, 196 yards, 2 TD, INT
Coastal Carolina	Rushing	Dominic Knicely	5 carries, 76 yards, TD
Coastal Carolina	Receiving	Malcom Gillie	1 reception, 69 yards, TD

=== vs James Madison ===
Game Nine – James Madison Dukes (7–1) at Marshall Thundering Herd (4–4) – Game summary

Quarter	1	2	3	4	Total
Dukes	7	14	7	7	35
Thundering Herd	0	12	8	3	23

at Joan C. Edwards Stadium • Huntington, West Virginia

- Date: Saturday, November 8, 2025
- Game time: 12:00 p.m. EST
- Game weather: Sunny
- Game attendance: 26,727
- Referee: Tim Barker
- TV announcers (ESPN2): Roy Philpott (play-by-play), Sam Acho (analyst) and Taylor Davis (sideline)

Game information

First quarter

- (8:02) JMU – Braeden Wisloski 26-yard pass from Alonza Barnett, Morgan Suarez kick (Drive: 8 plays, 82 yards, 3:44; James Madison 7–0)

Second quarter

- (13:55) MRSH – Antwan Roberts 13-yard run, Lorcan Quinn kick failed (Drive: 9 plays, 53 yards, 3:52; James Madison 7–6)
- (8:38) JMU – Wayne Knight 6-yard run, Morgan Suarez kick (Drive: 10 plays, 75 yards, 5:17; James Madison 14–6)
- (4:45) MRSH – Lorcan Quinn 49-yard field goal (Drive: 6 plays, 38 yards, 2:02; James Madison 14–9)
- (0:28) JMU – Jordan Fuller 1-yard run, Morgan Suarez kick (Drive: 10 plays, 75 yards, 4:17; James Madison 21–9)
- (0:00) MRSH – Lorcan Quinn 52-yard field goal (Drive: 5 plays, 18 yards, 0:21; James Madison 21–12)

Third quarter

- (7:47) JMU – Jaylen Sanchez 80-yard pass from Alonza Barnett, Morgan Suarez kick (Drive: 1 play, 80 yards, 0:11; James Madison 28–12)
- (1:04) MRSH – Tracy Stephens 4-yard pass from Carlos Del Rio-Wilson, De'Andre Tamarez pass from Carlos Del Rio-Wilson (Drive: 14 plays, 75 yards, 6:43; James Madison 28–20)

Fourth quarter

- (10:15) MRSH – Lorcan Quinn 23-yard field goal (Drive: 7 plays, 38 yards, 3:13; James Madison 28–23)
- (2:16) JMU – Wayne Knight 49-yard pass from Alonza Barnett, Morgan Suarez kick (Drive: 3 plays, 56 yards, 0:58; James Madison 35–23)

Statistics	JMU	MRSH
First downs	20	25
Plays–yards	59–409	86–414
Rushes–yards	35–139	50–248
Passing yards	270	166
Passing: Comp–Att–Int	14–24–1	17–36–0
Turnovers	1	0
Time of possession	28:03	31:57

Team	Category	Player	Statistics
James Madison	Passing	Alonza Barnett	14/24, 270 yards, 3 TD, INT
James Madison	Rushing	Wayne Knight	14 carries, 87 yards, TD
James Madison	Receiving	Jaylen Sanchez	3 receptions, 86 yards, TD
Marshall	Passing	Carlos Del Rio-Wilson	16/35, 154 yards, TD
Marshall	Rushing	Antwan Roberts	20 carries, 121 yards, TD
Marshall	Receiving	De'Andre Tamarez	3 receptions, 37 yards

=== at Georgia State ===
Game Ten – Marshall Thundering Herd (4–5) at Georgia State Panthers (1–8) – Game summary

Quarter	1	2	3	4	Total
Thundering Herd	7	14	0	9	30
Panthers	7	3	8	0	18

at Center Parc Stadium • Atlanta, Georgia

- Date: Saturday, November 15, 2025
- Game time: 2:00 p.m. EST
- Game weather: Sunny • Temperature: 72 °F (22 °C)
- Game attendance: 12,871
- Referee: Scott Broadway
- TV announcers (ESPN+): Matt Stewart (play-by-play) and Sam Crenshaw (analyst)

Game information

First quarter

- (13:05) GAST – Jordon Simmons 92-yard run, Liam Rickman kick (Drive: 2 plays, 92 yards, 0:18; Georgia State 7–0)
- (1:50) MRSH – Michael Allen 4-yard run, Lorcan Quinn kick (Drive: 7 plays, 85 yards, 2:38; Tied 7–7)

Second quarter

- (5:30) MRSH – Demarcus Lacey 5-yard pass from Carlos Del Rio-Wilson, Lorcan Quinn kick (Drive: 9 plays, 71 yards, 4:38; Marshall 14–7)
- (0:46) MRSH – Toby Payne 26-yard pass from Carlos Del Rio-Wilson, Lorcan Quinn kick (Drive: 8 plays, 90 yards, 2:05; Marshall 21–7)
- (0:00) GAST – Braeden McAllister 60-yard field goal (Drive: 7 plays, 32 yards, 0:46; Marshall 21–10)

Third quarter

- (3:23) GAST – Grant Hollier 2-yard pass from T. J. Finley, Jordan Simmons pass from T. J. Finley (Drive: 15 plays, 96 yards, 8:50; Marshall 21–18)

Fourth quarter

- (14:17) MRSH – Lorcan Quinn 30-yard field goal (Drive: 8 plays, 55 yards, 4:02; Marshall 24–18)
- (6:38) MRSH – Adrian Norton 29-yard pass from Carlos Del Rio-Wilson, Carlos Del Rio-Wilson pass failed (Drive: 8 plays, 97 yards, 3:45; Marshall 30–18)

Statistics	MRSH	GAST
First downs	24	21
Plays–yards	61–489	76–409
Rushes–yards	34–168	35–158
Passing yards	321	251
Passing: Comp–Att–Int	22–27–0	25–41–2
Turnovers	0	3
Time of possession	27:27	32:33

Team	Category	Player	Statistics
Marshall	Passing	Carlos Del Rio-Wilson	22/27, 321 yards, 3 TD
Marshall	Rushing	Carlos Del Rio-Wilson	17 carries, 97 yards
Marshall	Receiving	Toby Payne	5 receptions, 110 yards, TD
Georgia State	Passing	T. J. Finley	25/39, 251 yards, TD, 2 INT
Georgia State	Rushing	Jordon Simmons	19 carries, 164 yards, TD
Georgia State	Receiving	Ted Hurst	7 receptions, 74 yards

=== at Appalachian State (The Old Mountain Feud) ===
Game Eleven – Marshall Thundering Herd (5–5) at Appalachian State Mountaineers (4–6) – Game summary

Quarter	1	2	3	4	Total
Thundering Herd	7	14	3	0	24
Mountaineers	3	13	7	3	26

at Kidd Brewer Stadium • Boone, North Carolina

- Date: Saturday, November 22, 2025
- Game time: 2:30 p.m. EST
- Game weather: Sunny • Temperature: 58 °F (14 °C) • Wind: E 15 mph
- Game attendance: 31,322
- Referee: Brandon Kirkland
- TV announcers (ESPN+): David Jackson (play-by-play) and Avery Hall (analyst)

Game information

First quarter

- (7:38) APP – Dominic De Freitas 32-yard field goal (Drive: 9 plays, 52 yards, 3:12; Appalachian State 3–0)
- (1:20) MRSH – Jo'Shon Barbie 5-yard run, Lorcan Quinn kick (Drive: 8 plays, 41 yards, 2:30; Marshall 7–3)

Second quarter

- (13:04) APP – Jaquari Lewis 18-yard run, two-point pass conversion attempt failed (Drive: 9 plays, 75 yards, 3:16; Appalachian State 9–7)
- (11:34) MRSH – Carlos Del Rio-Wilson 16-yard run, Lorcan Quinn kick (Drive: 4 plays, 75 yards, 1:30; Marshall 14–9)
- (8:14) MRSH – Carlos Del Rio-Wilson 4-yard run, Lorcan Quinn kick (Drive: 6 plays, 55 yards, 2:34; Marshall 21–9)
- (0:53) APP – David Larkins 19-yard pass from JJ Kohl, Dominic De Freitas kick (Drive: 8 plays, 75 yards, 3:15; Marshall 21–16)

Third quarter

- (9:27) APP – Jaquari Lewis 5-yard run, Dominic De Freitas kick (Drive: 12 plays, 75 yards, 5:33; Appalachian State 23–21)
- (5:29) MRSH – Lorcan Quinn 25-yard field goal (Drive: 9 plays, 64 yards, 3:52; Marshall 24–23)

Fourth quarter

- (2:02) APP – Dominic De Freitas 23-yard field goal (Drive: 8 plays, 35 yards, 3:31; Appalachian State 26–24)

Statistics	MRSH	APP
First downs	23	18
Plays–yards	70–438	70–276
Rushes–yards	40–238	43–142
Passing yards	200	134
Passing: Comp–Att–Int	21–30–1	19–27–0
Turnovers	3	0
Time of possession	30:09	29:51

Team	Category	Player	Statistics
Marshall	Passing	Carlos Del Rio-Wilson	13/21, 146 yards, INT
Marshall	Rushing	Jo'Shon Barbie	10 carries, 102 yards, TD
Marshall	Receiving	Demarcus Lacey	12 receptions, 134 yards
Appalachian State	Passing	JJ Kohl	19/27, 134 yards, TD
Appalachian State	Rushing	Jaquari Lewis	33 carries, 175 yards, 2 TD
Appalachian State	Receiving	Jaquari Lewis	5 receptions, 39 yards

=== vs Georgia Southern ===
Game Twelve – Georgia Southern Eagles (5-6) at Marshall Thundering Herd (5-6) – Game summary

Quarter	1	2	3	4	Total
Eagles	14	0	10	0	24
Thundering Herd	3	3	6	7	19

at Joan C. Edwards Stadium • Huntington, West Virginia

- Date: Saturday, November 29, 2025
- Game time: 1:30 p.m. EST
- Game weather: Sunny
- Game attendance: 21,524
- Referee: Jeremy Parker
- TV announcers (ESPN+): Keith Morehouse (play-by-play), Mark Martin (analyst) and Ben Westfall (sideline)

Game information

First quarter

- (12:06) MRSH - Lorcan Quinn 42-yard field goal (Drive: 7 plays, 36 yards, 2:43; Marshall 3-0)
- (7:53) GASO - Marcus Sanders Jr. 33-yard pass from Weston Bryan, Tripp Bryant kick (Drive: 9 plays, 75 yards, 4:13; Georgia Southern 7-3)
- (0:49) GASO - Camden Brown 14-yard pass from JC French IV, Tripp Bryant kick (Drive: 13 plays, 81 yards, 5:51; Georgia Southern 14-3)

Second quarter

- (1:52) MRSH - Lorcan Quinn 24-yard field goal (Drive: 11 plays, 70 yards, 3:46; Georgia Southern 14-6)

Third quarter

- (9:41) GASO - Camden Brown 12-yard pass from JC French IV, Tripp Bryant kick (Drive: 10 plays, 76 yards, 5:11; Georgia Southern 21-6)
- (3:49) GASO - Tripp Bryant 24-yard field goal (Drive: 10 plays, 82 yards, 4:27; Georgia Southern 24-6)
- (2:19) MRSH - Antwan Roberts 17-yard run, two-point pass conversion failed (Drive: 4 plays, 60 yards, 1:25; Georgia Southern 24-12)

Fourth quarter

- (2:19) MRSH - Adrian Norton 41-yard pass from Zion Turner, Lorcan Quinn kick (Drive: 5 plays, 72 yards, 1:36; Georgia Southern 24-19)

Statistics	GASO	MRSH
First downs	31	18
Plays–yards	87–528	51–372
Rushes–yards	48–173	16–64
Passing yards	355	308
Passing: Comp–Att–Int	26-39-0	22-35-1
Turnovers	1	1
Time of possession	41:38	18:22

Team	Category	Player	Statistics
Georgia Southern	Passing	JC French IV	24/37, 313 yards, 2 TD
Georgia Southern	Rushing	Taeo Todd	13 carries, 60 yards
Georgia Southern	Receiving	Camden Brown	9 receptions, 157 yards, 2 TD
Marshall	Passing	Zion Turner	13/19, 172 yards, TD
Marshall	Rushing	Antwan Roberts	1 carry, 17 yards, TD
Marshall	Receiving	Adrian Norton	8 receptions, 160 yards, TD
