= ARMOGeddon Rivalry =

College football rivalry between Missouri State and Arkansas State

ARMOgeddon Rivalry
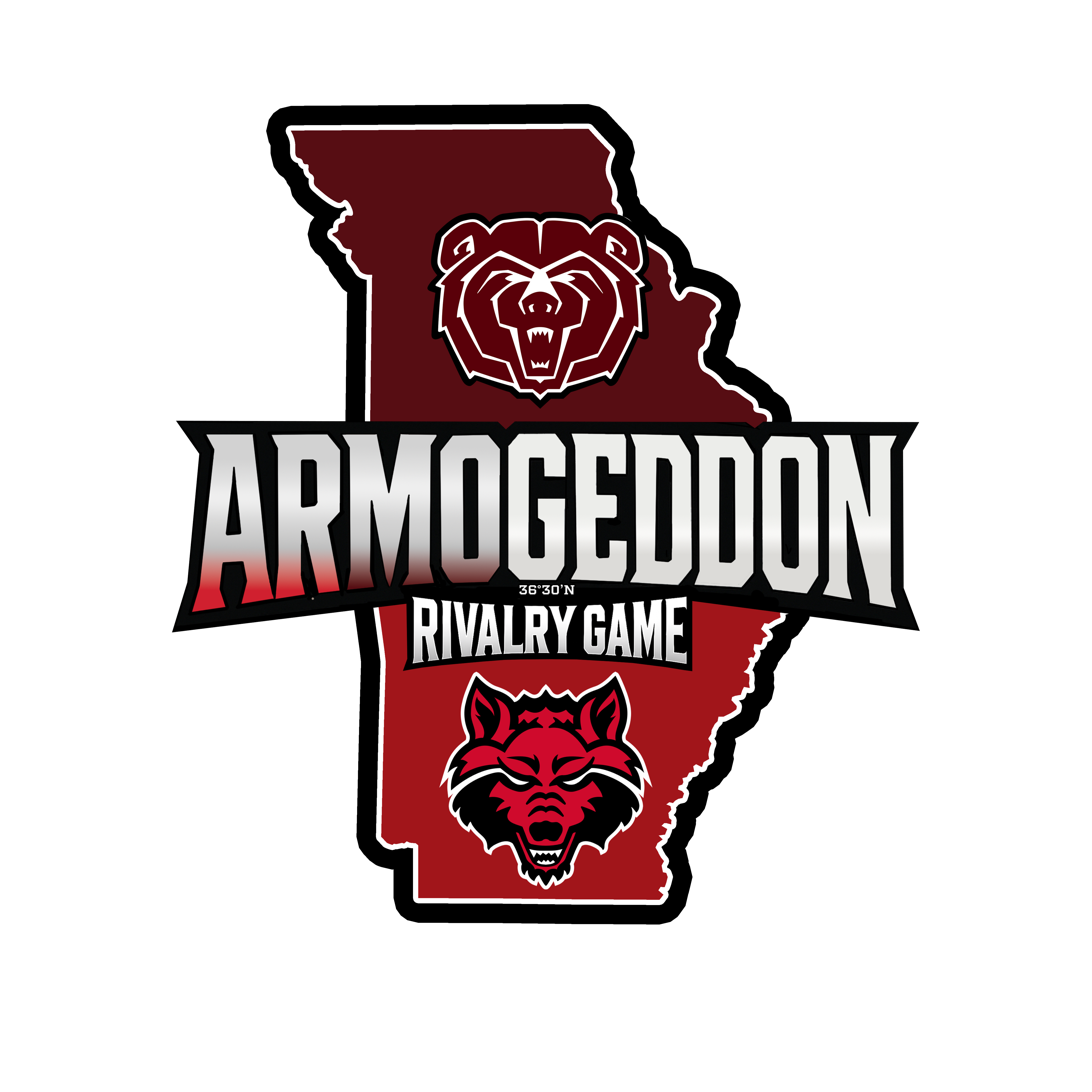

- Arkansas State Red Wolves Missouri State Bears
- Sport: Football
- First meeting: December 18, 2025; Arkansas State, 34–28
- Latest meeting: December 18, 2025; Arkansas State, 34–28
- Next meeting: September 25, 2027
- Trophy: ARMOgeddon Trophy

Statistics
- Total meetings: 1
- All-time series: Arkansas State leads, 1–0
- Largest victory: Arkansas State, 34–28 (2025)
- Longest win streak: Arkansas State, 1 (2025–present)
- Current win streak: Arkansas State, 1 (2025–present)

Locations of Arkansas State and Missouri State

The ARMOgeddon Rivalry is a college football rivalry between the Missouri State Bears and the Arkansas State Red Wolves. The rivalry is rooted in the shared border between Missouri and Arkansas, defined by the 36°30′ north latitude line, and is symbolized by a fan‑created trophy known as the ARMOgeddon Trophy. Although the two programs have met only intermittently, supporters from both schools have collaborated to establish the matchup as a long‑term, geography‑driven tradition.

== History ==
=== Early meetings ===
Missouri State and Arkansas State first met in the 21st century, with their initial matchup producing a competitive, one‑score game that sparked interest among fans of both programs. While the teams do not share a long historical series, their proximity and cultural overlap made the matchup a natural candidate for a formalized rivalry.

=== Creation of the ARMOgeddon Trophy ===
The ARMOgeddon Trophy was conceived, designed, and funded entirely by fans and alumni from both universities. Unlike many college football trophies created by athletic departments or conference offices, ARMOgeddon emerged from grassroots supporter culture.

The trophy's name blends "AR" (Arkansas), "MO" (Missouri), and the word "armageddon," reflecting the intensity and pride associated with border‑state competition.

The design incorporates:

- A clear acrylic upper section
- A wooden base
- Engravings referencing the Ozarks of southern Missouri and Crowley's Ridge in northeastern Arkansas
- A geographic nod to the 36°30′ line, the border that defines the rivalry's identity

The trophy is intended to be presented postgame without ceremony, emphasizing authenticity and player ownership rather than pageantry.

== Geographic significance ==
The rivalry draws heavily on the natural and cultural geography of the region:

- The Ozarks, a highland region covering much of southern Missouri, represent Missouri State's home environment.
- Crowley's Ridge, a unique geological formation running through eastern Arkansas, symbolizes Arkansas State's regional identity.
- The 36°30′ north latitude line forms the literal border between the states and serves as the conceptual anchor for the rivalry.

== Trophy series ==
Because the rivalry is newly formalized, the ARMOgeddon Trophy series is in its early stages. The series is scheduled to continue with future matchups beginning in 2027, with both fan bases expressing interest in making the game an annual or semi‑regular fixture.

== Cultural impact ==
The ARMOgeddon project has been noted for:

- Its fan‑driven origins, unusual in modern college football
- Its emphasis on regional pride rather than institutional marketing
- Its potential to grow into a long‑term tradition as the programs continue to schedule games

Supporters from both schools have described the rivalry as a celebration of shared geography, mutual respect, and competitive spirit.

== Game results ==
Arkansas State victories	Missouri State victories

No.	Date	Location	Winner	Score
1	December 18, 2025	Frisco, TX	Arkansas State	34–28
Series: Arkansas State leads 1–0

== See also ==
- Missouri State Bears football
- Arkansas State Red Wolves football
