= Nick Petrino =

American football player and coach

Current position
- Title: Offensive coordinator and quarterbacks coach
- Team: Coastal Carolina
- Conference: Sun Belt

Playing career
- 2007–2009: Arkansas
- Position: Quarterback

Coaching career (HC unless noted)
- 2010–2011: Arkansas (SA)
- 2013: Western Kentucky (GA)
- 2014–2015: Louisville (GA)
- 2016–2018: Louisville (QB)
- 2019: UT Martin (co-OC/QB)
- 2020–2025: Missouri State (OC/QB)
- 2025: Missouri State (interim HC)
- 2026–present: Coastal Carolina (OC/QB)

Head coaching record
- Overall: 0–1
- Bowls: 0–1

Nick Petrino is an American football coach who is currently the offensive coordinator and quarterbacks coach for the Coastal Carolina Chanticleers.

== Playing career ==
Petrino attended Trinity High School in St. Matthews, Kentucky. Coming out of high school, he committed to play college football at Georgetown College. He departed Georgetown after his freshman season for the Arkansas Razorbacks as a preferred walk-on. During his time as a Razorback or a Tiger, he did not appear in any games.

== Coaching career ==
Petrino got his first coaching job in 2010 as a student assistant at his alma mater Arkansas. In 2013, Petrino was hired by Western Kentucky as a graduate assistant. In 2014, he joined Louisville as a graduate assistant. Ahead of the 2016 season, he was promoted to serve as the team's quarterbacks coach. In 2019, Petrino joined UT Martin as the team's co-offensive coordinator and quarterbacks coach. In 2020, he joined his dad at Missouri State as the team's offensive coordinator and quarterbacks coach. On December 12, 2025, Petrino was announced as the Bears interim head coach for their bowl game, after previous coach Ryan Beard was hired by Coastal Carolina.

== Head coaching record ==
Year	Team	Overall	Conference	Standing	Bowl/playoffs
Missouri State Bears (Conference USA) (2025)
2025	Missouri State	0–1			L Xbox (Note: Petrino served as interim head coach after Ryan Beard was hired by Coastal Carolina.)
Missouri State:		0–1	0–0		
Total:		0–1			

== Personal life ==
He is the son of college football coach Bobby Petrino.
