= Frisco Football Classic =

College football postseason game

- Stadium: Ford Center at The Star
- Location: Frisco, Texas
- Operated: 2025–present
- Conference tie-ins: Conference USA; Sun Belt Conference
- Website: espnevents.com/frisco-football-classic/

Sponsors
- Xbox (2025)

Former names
- Xbox Bowl (2025)

2025 matchup
- Missouri State vs. Arkansas State (Arkansas State 34–28)

The Frisco Football Classic is an annual NCAA Division I Football Bowl Subdivision (FBS) college football bowl game played at Ford Center at The Star in Frisco, Texas. The inaugural edition of the bowl was held in December 2025, branded as the Xbox Bowl. Owned by ESPN Events, the bowl has tie-ins with Conference USA and the Sun Belt Conference.

== History ==
On December 4, 2025, the Xbox Bowl was announced as the replacement for the Bahamas Bowl. Prior to the introduction of the Xbox Bowl, the most recent Football Bowl Subdivision (FBS) bowl game to debut was the Fenway Bowl in 2022. The matchup for the inaugural edition of the Xbox Bowl was announced as Missouri State vs. Arkansas State. Several Xbox gaming characters were used as mascots during the game, most notably Master Chief awarding the trophy to the winners.

Xbox's sponsorship was only for one season; the second edition was announced to be played on December 15, 2026, and will be known as the Frisco Football Classic pending sponsorship.

== Game results ==
| Date | Bowl name | Winning team | | Losing team | | Attendance |
|---|---|---|---|---|---|---|
| December 18, 2025 | Xbox Bowl | Arkansas State | 34 | Missouri State | 28 | 7,782 |
| December 15, 2026 | Frisco Football Classic | | | | | |

== MVPs ==
| Game | Offensive MVP | | | Defensive MVP | | |
| Game | Player | Team | Position | Player | Team | Position |
|---|---|---|---|---|---|---|
| 2025 | Corey Rucker | Arkansas State | WR | Kyle Taylor | Arkansas State | LB |

== Appearances by conference ==
Updated through the December 2025 edition (1 game, 2 total appearances).

| Conference | Record | | | | Appearances by season | |
| Conference | Games | W | L | Win pct. | Won | Lost |
|---|---|---|---|---|---|---|
| Sun Belt | 1 | 1 | 0 | 1.000 | 2025 | |
| CUSA | 1 | 0 | 1 | .000 | | 2025 |

== See also ==
- List of college bowl games
