= American Bowl (college football) =

- Stadium: Victory Field
- Location: Lakeland, Florida
- Operated: 2026–present
- Website: theamericanbowl.com

Sponsors
- Caribe Royale Orlando Resort (2026–present)

2026 matchup
- Guardians vs. Warhawks (Warhawks 7–6)

The American Bowl is a postseason college football all-star game first played in January 2026. It is held at Victory Field on the campus of Southeastern University in Lakeland, Florida.

The bowl features a military motif to honor veterans of the United States Armed Forces.

== Inception ==
The game was created by Scott Phillips Jr., a coach who previously worked as director of player personnel for Kent State and oversaw the Hula Bowl. While he enjoyed working the Hula Bowl, Phillips wanted to "do something a little bit different" and organized the American Bowl.

It has been described as taking the Hula Bowl's slot as the third most prestigious collegiate all-star game after the Senior Bowl and East–West Shrine Bowl. According to Phillips, a third all-star game was vital for helping obscure college players get selected in "the back half" of the NFL draft and "the immediate hours after it". For this reason, Phillips partnered with the National Football League to develop the American Bowl as a successor to the NFLPA Collegiate Bowl. NFL Network also acquired broadcast rights for the inaugural game while NFL referees were appointed to officiate it.

The American Bowl gained access to the facilities and campus of the University of Central Florida (UCF) for practice, which were previously used by the Hula Bowl until it moved to a different venue, reportedly due to unpaid fees. Former Hula Bowl sponsor and hotel Caribe Royale also offered lodging for American Bowl players and personnel. Hula Bowl head coaches Brian Billick and Mike Smith were recruited to coach the American Bowl. Due to renovations at UCF's Acrisure Bounce House, the 2026 American Bowl was scheduled for the home field of the Southeastern Fire, Victory Field in Lakeland, roughly 40 minutes away from Caribe Royale and UCF.

Rosters of the debut edition of the bowl show that most players were invited from Football Bowl Subdivision (FBS) programs such as Notre Dame, Penn State, and Northern Illinois, along with some players from smaller programs such as Minnesota State–Moorhead (Division II) and John Carroll (Division III).

== Theme ==
The American Bowl is themed around the U.S. Armed Forces. For example, the team names of "Guardians" and "Warhawks" were taken from military units. Phillips explained the motif was inspired by football director Chris Covyeau, who worked for the Naval Academy and came up with military terminology for the bowl to use.

Similar to the East–West Shrine Bowl's proceeds going to charity and the Senior Bowl supporting the cultural sector of Mobile, Alabama, Phillips introduced a philanthropic aspect to the American Bowl centered on supporting the military. Phillips said he and Covyeau "felt a significant and sincere tie to the military, and knew we wanted to give an opportunity to closer connect the veteran community to the game."

The bowl partnered with Soldiers to Sidelines, a charity aimed at helping veterans get into coaching, to appoint "soldier coaches" as assistants for both teams.

== Game results ==
Year	Date	Winning team	Score	Losing team	Ref.
2026	January 22	Warhawks	7–6	Guardians	

=== MVP ===
Year	Player	Position	College team	Ref.
2026	Jacob Clark	QB	Missouri State	

== See also ==
- List of college bowl games
