= 2025 Xbox Bowl =

Postseason college football bowl game

- 1st Xbox Bowl
| Missouri State Bears | Arkansas State Red Wolves |
| (7–5) | (6–6) |
| CUSA | Sun Belt |
| 28 | 34 |
| Head coach: Nick Petrino (interim) | Head coach: Butch Jones |
| | 1 | 2 | 3 | 4 | Total |
|---|---|---|---|---|---|
| Missouri State | 7 | 0 | 0 | 21 | 28 |
| Arkansas State | 14 | 10 | 7 | 3 | 34 |
- Date: December 18, 2025
- Season: 2025
- Stadium: Ford Center at The Star
- Location: Frisco, Texas
- MVP: Corey Rucker (WR, Arkansas State); Kyle Taylor (LB, Arkansas State)
- Referee: Kenneth Ray (Mountain West)
- Attendance: 7,782

United States TV coverage
- Network: ESPN2
- Announcers: Jorge Sedano (play-by-play), Rodney McLeod (analyst), and Victoria Arlen (sideline reporter)

The 2025 Xbox Bowl was a college football bowl game that was played on December 18, 2025, at Ford Center at The Star in Frisco, Texas. The first edition of the Xbox Bowl, it began at approximately 8:00 p.m. CST. The Xbox Bowl was one of the 2025–26 bowl games concluding the 2025 FBS football season, and the only such bowl to air primarily on ESPN2. The game's title sponsor was Microsoft Gaming via their Xbox brand.

In 2025, the Xbox Bowl was created as a new bowl game, replacing the Bahamas Bowl.

The inaugural Xbox Bowl featured the Missouri State Bears (7–5) of Conference USA and the Arkansas State Red Wolves (6–6) of the Sun Belt Conference. Arkansas State beat Missouri State by a score of 34–28.

== Teams ==
This matchup between Arkansas State and Missouri State was the sixth all-time meeting between the two programs; they first played in 1923. Entering the bowl, the Red Wolves led the series, 3–2. The most recent prior meeting between the two programs was in 2015, which was a Red Wolves victory, 70–7.

=== Missouri State Bears ===
Missouri State compiled a 7–5 record (5–3 in conference). Because this was the final year of a two-year transition from the Football Championship Subdivision, Missouri State was not originally bowl eligible. However, because of an insufficient number of bowl-eligible teams available to fill all bowl games, the Bears were ultimately granted a bowl game berth. This was the first Division I-A bowl game in Missouri State school history.

The Bears were led by interim head coach Nick Petrino for their bowl game; he took over from Ryan Beard (who was hired by Coastal Carolina) on December 12.

=== Arkansas State Red Wolves ===
Arkansas State posted a 6–6 record (5–3) in conference, winning five of their final seven games after starting the season with a 1–4 record. This was Arkansas State's third consecutive season with a bowl game appearance and their 13th overall bowl game.

== Game summary ==
2025 Xbox Bowl

| Quarter | 1 | 2 | 3 | 4 | Total |
|---|---|---|---|---|---|
| Missouri State | 7 | 0 | 0 | 21 | 28 |
| Arkansas State | 14 | 10 | 7 | 3 | 34 |

at Ford Center at The Star • Frisco, Texas

- Date: December 18, 2025
- Game time: 8:00 p.m. CST
- Game weather: N/A (played indoor)
- Game attendance: 7,782
- Referee: Kenneth Ray
- TV announcers (ESPN2): Jorge Sedano (play-by-play), Rodney McLeod (analyst), and Victoria Arlen (sideline reporter)
- Box score

=== Statistics ===
| Statistics | MOST | ARST |
|---|---|---|
| First downs | 23 | 16 |
| Plays–yards | 73–396 | 56–359 |
| Rushes–yards | 38–47 | 25–71 |
| Passing yards | 349 | 288 |
| Passing: comp–att–int | 25–35–0 | 17–31–0 |
| Turnovers | | |
| Time of possession | 39:07 | 20:53 |

| Team | Category | Player | Statistics |
|---|---|---|---|
| Missouri State | Passing | Jacob Clark | 25/35, 349 yards, 4 TD |
| Missouri State | Rushing | Shomari Lawrence | 16 carries, 57 yards |
| Missouri State | Receiving | Dash Luke | 7 receptions, 169 yards, 2 TD |
| Arkansas State | Passing | Jaylen Raynor | 17/31, 288 yards, 3 TD |
| Arkansas State | Rushing | Kenyon Clay | 11 carries, 53 yards |
| Arkansas State | Receiving | Corey Rucker | 6 receptions, 166 yards, 1 TD |

== See also ==
- 2025 Frisco Bowl, played at the same venue
