= 2025 Missouri State Bears football team =

American college football season

2025 Missouri State Bears football

Xbox Bowl, L 28–34 vs. Arkansas State
- Conference: Conference USA
- Record: 7–6 (5–3 CUSA)
- Head coach: Ryan Beard (3rd season; regular season); Nick Petrino (interim, bowl game)
- Offensive coordinator: Nick Petrino (6th season)
- Offensive scheme: Multiple
- Defensive coordinator: L. D. Scott (3rd season)
- Base defense: 4–2–5
- Home stadium: Robert W. Plaster Stadium

2025 Conference USA football standings
	Conf.			Overall
Team	W		L	W		L
Kennesaw State y$	7	–	1	10	–	4
Jacksonville State y	7	–	1	9	–	5
Western Kentucky	6	–	2	9	–	4
Louisiana Tech	5	–	3	8	–	5
FIU	5	–	3	7	–	6
Missouri State	5	–	3	7	–	6
Delaware	4	–	4	7	–	6
Liberty	3	–	5	4	–	8
New Mexico State	2	–	6	4	–	8
Middle Tennessee	2	–	6	3	–	9
Sam Houston	1	–	7	2	–	10
UTEP	1	–	7	2	–	10
Championship: Kennesaw State 19, Jacksonville State 15
$ – Conference champion; y – Championship game participant

The 2025 Missouri State Bears football team represented Missouri State University as a member of Conference USA (CUSA) during the 2025 NCAA Division I FBS football season. Led by Ryan Beard in his third and final season as head coach during the regular season and Nick Petrino as interim head coach or the team's bowl game, the Bears compiled an overall record of 7–6 with a mark of 5–3 in conference play, placing in a three-way tie for fourth in CUSA. The 2025 season was Missouri State's first in Conference USA and at the FBS level after transitioning from the NCAA Division I Football Championship Subdivision (FCS). Although initially declared ineligible for postseason play due to FCS-to-FBS transition rules, the Bears were invited to the Xbox Bowl because there were not enough six-win teams eligible for the 42 FBS bowl games. Missouri State lost the bowl game to Arkansas State. The team played home games at Robert W. Plaster Stadium located in Springfield, Missouri.

== Schedule ==
Date	Time	Opponent	Site	TV	Result	Attendance
August 30	6:30 p.m.	at USC*	Los Angeles Memorial Coliseum; Los Angeles, CA	BTN	L 13–73	62,841
September 6	5:00 p.m.	at Marshall*	Joan C. Edwards Stadium; Huntington, WV	ESPN+	W 21–20	28,564
September 13	2:30 p.m.	SMU*	Robert W. Plaster Stadium; Springfield, MO	CBSSN	L 10–28	15,027
September 20	6:00 p.m.	UT Martin*	Robert W. Plaster Stadium; Springfield, MO	ESPN+	W 42–10	14,476
September 27	6:00 p.m.	Western Kentucky	Robert W. Plaster Stadium; Springfield, MO	ESPN+	L 22–27	10,068
October 8	6:30 p.m.	at Middle Tennessee	Johnny "Red" Floyd Stadium; Murfreesboro, TN	ESPN2	W 22–20	9,806
October 22	8:00 p.m.	at New Mexico State	Aggie Memorial Stadium; Las Cruces, NM	CBSSN	W 24–17 ^{OT}	8,790
October 29	7:00 p.m.	FIU	Robert W. Plaster Stadium; Springfield, MO	CBSSN	W 28–21	8,754
November 8	12:00 p.m.	at Liberty	Williams Stadium; Lynchburg, VA	ESPN+	W 21–17	18,407
November 15	2:00 p.m.	UTEP^{†}	Robert W. Plaster Stadium; Springfield, MO	ESPN+	W 38–24	13,298
November 22	1:00 p.m.	at Kennesaw State	Fifth Third Stadium; Kennesaw, GA	ESPN+	L 34–41	11,040
November 29	1:00 p.m.	Louisiana Tech	Robert W. Plaster Stadium; Springfield, MO	ESPN+	L 30–42	7,656
December 18	8:00 p.m.	vs. Arkansas State*	Ford Center at The Star; Frisco, TX (Xbox Bowl)	ESPN2	L 28–34	7,782
*Non-conference game; ^{†}Homecoming; All times are in Central time

== Game summaries ==
=== at USC ===
Game One – Missouri State Bears (0–0) at USC Trojans (0–0) – Game summary

Quarter	1	2	3	4	Total
Bears	3	7	3	0	13
Trojans	14	28	14	17	73

at Los Angeles Memorial Coliseum • Los Angeles, CA

- Date: August 30
- Game time: 4:30 p.m.
- Game weather: Sunny • Temperature: 89 °F (32 °C) • Wind: SW at 9 miles per hour (14 km/h)
- Game attendance: 62,841
- Referee: Francisco Villar
- TV announcers (BTN): Guy Haberman (play-by-play), Yogi Roth (analyst), and Rhett Lewis (sideline)

Game information

First quarter

- (10:12) MOST - Yousef Obeid 44-yard field goal (Drive: 9 plays, 48 yards, 4:48; Missouri State 3–0)
- (6:58) USC - Waymond Jordan 5-yard run (Ryon Sayeri kick), (Drive: 7 plays, 75 yards, 3:08; USC 7–3)
- (0:28) USC - Bryan Jackson 3-yard run (Ryon Sayeri kick), (Drive: 10 plays, 75 yards, 4:50; USC 14–3)

Second quarter

- (13:21) USC - Lake McRee 64-yard pass from Jayden Maiava (Ryon Sayrei kick), (Drive: 1 play, 64 yards, 0:09; USC 21–3)
- (12:00) USC - Bishop Fitzgerald 39-yard interception return (Ryon Satrei kick); (USC 28–3)
- (7:58) MOST - Tristian Gardner 33-yard pass from Jacob Clark (Yousef Obeid kick), (Drive: 7 plays, 65 yards, 4:02; USC 28–10)
- (3:35) USC - Jayden Maiava 3-yard run (Ryon Sayeri kick) (Drive: 8 plays, 76 yards, 4:17; USC 35–10)
- (0:25) USC - Eli Sanders 73-yard pass from Jayden Maiava (Ryon Sayeri kick), (Drive: 5 plays, 97 yards, 1:10; USC 42–10)

Third quarter

- (10:26) USC – Husan Longstreet 5-yard run, (Ryon Sayeri kick), (Drive: 8 plays, 74 yards, 4:34; USC 49–10)
- (7:50) MOST – Yousef Obeid 46-yard field goal (Drive: 4 plays - 7 yards, 2:08; USC 49–13)
- (5:30) USC – King Miller 75-yard run (Ryon Sayeri kick), (Drive: 1 play, 75 yards, 0:12; USC 56–13)

Fourth quarter

- (13:30) USC – Husan Longstreet 17-yard run (Ryan Sayeri kick), (Drive: 4 plays, 38 yards, 2:28; USC 63–13)
- (10:51) USC – Ryan Sayeri 32-yard field goal (Drive: 5 plays, 7 yards, 2:21; USC 66–13)
- (4:46) USC – Carson Tabracci 9-yard pass from Husan Longstreet (William Weisberg kick), (Drive: 7 plays, 52 yards, 3:48; USC 73–13)

Statistics	MOST	USC
First downs	11	27
Plays–yards	57–224	57–597
Rushes–yards	29–65	30–233
Passing yards	159	364
Passing: comp–att–int	20–28–2	24–27–0
Turnovers	3	1
Time of possession	32:31	27:29

Team	Category	Player	Statistics
Missouri State	Passing	Jacob Clark	16/24, 147 yards, TD, 2 INT
Missouri State	Rushing	Shomari Lawrence	12 carries, 50 yards
Missouri State	Receiving	Tristian Gardner	2 receptions, 39 yards, TD
USC	Passing	Jayden Maiava	15/18, 295 yards, 2 TD
USC	Rushing	King Miller	4 carries, 80 yards, TD
USC	Receiving	Makai Lemon	7 receptions, 90 yards

=== at Marshall ===
Game Two – Missouri State Bears (0–1) at Marshall Thundering Herd (0–1) – Game summary

Quarter	1	2	3	4	Total
Bears	0	7	7	7	21
Thundering Herd	0	17	3	0	20

at Joan C. Edwards Stadium • Huntington, WV

- Date: Saturday September 6, 2025
- Game time: 5:00 p.m. CDT
- Game weather: Rain
- Game attendance: 28,564
- Referee: Brandon Kirkland
- TV announcers (ESPN+): Keith Morehouse (play-by-play) and Mark Martin (analyst)

Game information

First quarter

- No scoring plays.

Second quarter

- (13:57) MOST – Ramone Green Jr. 57-yard pass from Jacob Clark, Yousef Obeid kick (Drive: 8 plays, 88 yards, 3:08; Missouri State 7–0)
- (11:07) MRSH – Zion Turner 14-yard run, Lorcan Quinn kick (Drive: 7 plays, 75 yards, 2:50; Tied 7–7)
- (3:36) MRSH – Justin Williams-Thomas 37-yard run, Lorcan Quinn kick (Drive: 10 plays, 76 yards, 4:43; Marshall 14–7)
- (0:44) MRSH – Lorcan Quinn 50-yard field goal (Drive: 4 plays, 4 yards, 0:54; Marshall 17–7)

Third quarter

- (9:08) MRSH – Lorcan Quinn 33-yard field goal (Drive: 4 plays, 4 yards, 2:04; Marshall 20–7)
- (7:59) MOST – Jmariyae Robinson 52-yard pass from Jacob Clark, Yousef Obeid kick (Drive: 3 plays, 74 yards, 1:03; Marshall 20–14)

Fourth quarter

- (2:12) MOST – Jaron Askren 8-yard pass from Jacob Clark, Yousef Obeid kick (Drive: 9 plays, 80 yards, 5:25; Missouri State 21–20)

Statistics	MOST	MRSH
First downs	18	12
Plays–yards	70–474	57–274
Rushes–yards	38–86	33–191
Passing yards	388	83
Passing: Comp–Att–Int	22–32–1	13–24–1
Turnovers	1	1
Time of possession	34:34	25:26

Team	Category	Player	Statistics
Missouri State	Passing	Jacob Clark	21/31, 359 yards, 3 TD, INT
Missouri State	Rushing	Shomari Lawrence	17 carries, 49 yards
Missouri State	Receiving	Ramone Green Jr.	4 receptions, 123 yards, TD
Marshall	Passing	Zion Turner	13/24, 83 yards, INT
Marshall	Rushing	Jo'Shon Barbe	12 carries, 67 yards
Marshall	Receiving	Toby Payne	4 receptions, 43 yards

=== vs. SMU ===
Game Three – SMU Mustangs (1–1) at Missouri State Bears (1–1) – Game summary

Quarter	1	2	3	4	Total
Mustangs	0	14	7	7	28
Bears	10	0	0	0	10

at Robert W. Plaster Stadium • Springfield, MO

- Date: Saturday September 13, 2025
- Game time: 2:30 p.m. CDT
- Game weather: Sunny • Temperature: 91 °F (33 °C) • Wind: W 7 mph
- Game attendance: 15,027
- Referee: Nolan Dumas
- TV announcers (CBSSN): Jack Gordon (play-by-play), Taylor McHargue (analyst) and Brandon Marcello (sideline)

Game information

First quarter

- MOST – Yousef Obeid 38-yard field goal, 10:21. Bears 3–0. Drive: 7 plays, 38 yards, 3:25.
- MOST – Dash Luke 9-yard pass from Jacob Clark (Yousef Obeid kick), 2:59. Bears 10–0. Drive: 6 plays, 74 yards, 3:58.

Second quarter

- SMU – Dramecko Green 6-yard run (Sam Keltner kick), 3:42. Bears 10–7. Drive: 12 plays, 73 yards, 3:54.
- SMU – T. J. Harden 5-yard run (Sam Keltner kick), 0:33. Mustangs 14–10. Drive: 8 plays, 80 yards, 1:19.

Third quarter

- SMU – T. J. Harden 37-yard run (Sam Keltner kick), 3:03. Mustangs 21–10. Drive: 3 plays, 46 yards, 1:18.

Fourth quarter

- SMU – RJ Maryland 7-yard pass from Kevin Jennings (Sam Keltner kick), 12:58. Mustangs 28–10. Drive: 5 plays, 55 yards, 2:02.

Statistics	SMU	MOST
First downs	24	19
Plays–yards	70–448	65–328
Rushes–yards	34–167	27–53
Passing yards	281	275
Passing: comp–att–int	24–36–1	23–38–3
Turnovers	2	3
Time of possession	28:30	31:30

Team	Category	Player	Statistics
SMU	Passing	Kevin Jennings	24/36, 281 yards, TD, INT
SMU	Rushing	T. J. Harden	15 carries, 96 yards, 2 TD
SMU	Receiving	Jalen Cooper	5 receptions, 68 yards
Missouri State	Passing	Jacob Clark	23/37, 275 yards, TD, 3 INT
Missouri State	Rushing	Shomari Lawrence	13 carries, 44 yards
Missouri State	Receiving	Dash Luke	5 receptions, 80 yards, TD

=== vs. UT Martin (FCS) ===
Game Four – UT Martin Skyhawks (FCS) (0–3) at Missouri State Bears (1–2) – Game summary

Quarter	1	2	3	4	Total
Skyhawks (FCS)	0	0	0	10	10
Bears	21	14	7	0	42

at Robert W. Plaster Stadium • Springfield, MO

- Date: Thursday September 20, 2025
- Game time: 6:00 p.m. CDT
- Game weather: Cloudy • Temperature: 75 °F (24 °C) • Wind: SW 8 mph
- Game attendance: 14,476
- Referee: Reed Brotherton
- TV announcers (ESPN+): Don West (play-by-play), Tom Mast (analyst) and Cierra Clark (sideline)

Game information

First quarter

- (11:50) MOST – Jacob Clark 7-yard run, Yousef Obeid kick (Drive: 5 plays, 32 yards, 1:58; Missouri State 7–0)
- (3:27) MOST – Jacob Clark 4-yard run, Yousef Obeid kick (Drive: 13 plays, 83 yards, 6:54; Missouri State 14–0)
- (0:27) MOST – James BlackStrain 6-yard pass from Jacob Clark, Yousef Obeid kick (Drive: 4 plays, 41 yards, 0:59; Missouri State 21–0)

Second quarter

- (11:25) MOST – Connor Lair 1-yard pass from Jacob Clark, Yousef Obeid kick (Drive: 8 plays, 62 yards, 3:26; Missouri State 28–0)
- (0:25) MOST – Dash Luke 17-yard pass from Jacob Clark, Yousef Obeid kick (Drive: 6 plays, 57 yards, 1:49; Missouri State 35–0)

Third quarter

- (12:45) MOST – Shomari Lawrence 50-yard run, Yousef Obeid kick (Drive: 5 plays, 80 yards, 2:11; Missouri State 42–0)

Fourth quarter

- (6:55) UTM – Cade Hechter 32-yard field goal (Drive: 21 plays, 78 yards, 11:13; Missouri State 42–3)
- (1:52) UTM – Tommy Ansley 1-yard run, Cade Hechter kick (Drive: 8 plays, 32 yards, 3:35; Missouri State 42–10)

Statistics	UTM	MOST
First downs	14	22
Plays–yards	57–221	61–417
Rushes–yards	25–71	29–130
Passing yards	150	287
Passing: Comp–Att–Int	23–32–1	22–32–0
Turnovers	3	1
Time of possession	29:32	30:28

Team	Category	Player	Statistics
UT Martin	Passing	Jase Bauer	19/27, 112 yards, INT
UT Martin	Rushing	Tommy Ansley	6 carries, 18 yards, TD
UT Martin	Receiving	Scottie Alexander	3 receptions, 27 yards
Missouri State	Passing	Jacob Clark	20/28, 271 yards, 3 TD
Missouri State	Rushing	Shomari Lawrence	8 carries, 65 yards, TD
Missouri State	Receiving	Dash Luke	9 receptions, 110 yards, TD

=== vs. Western Kentucky ===
Game Five – Western Kentucky Hilltoppers (3–1) at Missouri State Bears (2–2) – Game summary

Quarter	1	2	3	4	Total
Hilltoppers	0	10	14	3	27
Bears	0	9	7	6	22

at Robert W. Plaster Stadium • Springfield, MO

- Date: Saturday September 27, 2025
- Game time: 6:00 p.m. CDT
- Game weather: Sunny • Temperature: 82 °F (28 °C) • Wind: W 4 mph
- Game attendance: 10,068
- Referee: Garrett Dickerson
- TV announcers (ESPN+): Don West (play-by-play), Tom Mast (analyst) and Cierra Clark (sideline)

Game information

First quarter

No scoring plays

Second quarter

- (14:55) MOST - Yousef Obeid 49-yard field goal Drive: 6 plays, 49 yards, 2:06; (Bears 3-0)
- (13:56) WKU - Noah Meyers 39-yard pass from Maverick McIvor (John Cannon kick) Drive: 3 plays, 75 yards, 0:59; (Hilltoppers 7-3)
- (8:43) WKU - John Cannon 26-yard field goal Drive: 10 plays, 56 yards, 3:48; (Hilltoppers 10-3)
- (03:31) MOST - Yousef Obeid 22-yard field goal Drive: 11 plays, 70 yards, 5:12; (Hilltoppers 10-6)
- (0:59) MOST - Yousef Obeid 19-yard field goal Drive: 5 plays, 48 yards, 1:12; (Hilltoppers 10-9)

Third quarter

- (12:16) MOST - Shomari Lawrence 32-yard run (Yousef Obeid kick) Drive: 7 plays, 75 yards, 2:44; (Bears 16-10)
- (6:29) WKU - La'Vell Wright 2-yard run (John Cannon kick) Drive: 12 plays, 75 yards, 5:47; (Hilltoppers 17-16)
- (1:16) WKU - La'Vell Wright 17-yard run (John Cannon kick) Drive: 4 plays, 65 yards, 1:55; (Hilltoppers 24-16)

Fourth quarter

- (12:21) WKU - John Cannon 19-yard field goal Drive: 7 plays, 79 yards, 2:27; (Hilltoppers 27-16)
- (4:13) MOST - Tristian Gardner 9-yard pass from Deuce Bailey Drive: 9 plays, 52 yards, 4:30; (Hilltoppers 27-22)

Statistics	WKU	MOST
First downs	25	21
Plays–yards	68–476	66–414
Rushes–yards	29–159	34–214
Passing yards	317	200
Passing: Comp–Att–Int	26–39–0	15–32–0
Turnovers	0	0
Time of possession	31:28	28:32

Team	Category	Player	Statistics
Western Kentucky	Passing	Maverick McIvor	26/39, 317 yards, TD
Western Kentucky	Rushing	La'Vell Wright	10 carries, 91 yards, 2 TD
Western Kentucky	Receiving	Matthew Henry	5 receptions, 73 yards
Missouri State	Passing	Jacob Clark	8/15, 143 yards
Missouri State	Rushing	Shomari Lawrence	16 carries, 78 yards, TD
Missouri State	Receiving	Dash Luke	3 receptions, 71 yds

=== at Middle Tennessee ===
Game Six – Missouri State Bears (2–3) at Middle Tennessee Blue Raiders (1–4) – Game summary

Quarter	1	2	3	4	Total
Bears	0	16	3	3	22
Blue Raiders	3	10	0	7	20

at Johnny "Red" Floyd Stadium • Murfreesboro, TN

- Date: Wednesday October 8, 2025
- Game time: 6:30 p.m. CDT
- Game weather: Clear • Temperature: 67 °F (19 °C) • Wind: NE 7 mph
- Game attendance: 9,806
- Referee: Rory Bernard
- TV announcers (ESPN2): Clay Matvick (play-by-play), Chase Daniel (analyst) and Victoria Arlen (sideline)

Game information

First quarter

- (10:42) MTSU – Jacob Hathaway 45-yard field goal (Drive: 8 plays, 38 yards, 4:18; Middle Tennessee 3–0)

Second quarter

- (11:27) MOST – Deuce Bailey 5-yard run (Drive: 3 plays, 24 yards, 0:56; Missouri State 6–3)
- (10:06) MTSU – Cam'ron Lacy 52-yard pass from Nicholas Vattiato, Jacob Hathaway kick (Drive: 3 plays, 82 yards, 1:12; Middle Tennessee 10–6)
- (5:29) MOST – Ronnel Johnson 20-yard pass from Deuce Bailey, Yousef Obeid kick (Drive: 10 plays, 79 yards, 4:31; Missouri State 13–10)
- (1:05) MOST – Yousef Obeid 39-yard field goal (Drive: 8 plays, 71 yards, 2:43; Missouri State 16–10)
- (0:00) MTSU – Jacob Hathaway 40-yard field goal (Drive: 9 plays, 56 yards, 0:59; Missouri State 16–13)

Third quarter

- (12:33) MOST – Yousef Obeid 25-yard field goal (Drive: 5 plays, 80 yards, 2:20; Missouri State 19–13)

Fourth quarter

- (9:12) MTSU – Cam'ron Lacy 10-yard pass from Nicholas Vattiato, Jacob Hathaway kick (Drive: 11 plays, 72 yards, 5:58; Middle Tennessee 20–19)
- (4:19) MOST – Yousef Obeid 29-yard field goal (Drive: 10 plays, 56 yards, 4:45; Missouri State 22–20)

Statistics	MOST	MTSU
First downs	19	22
Plays–yards	66–348	68–353
Rushes–yards	35–70	25–86
Passing yards	278	267
Passing: Comp–Att–Int	16–31–0	30–43–0
Turnovers	0	1
Time of possession	30:42	29:18

Team	Category	Player	Statistics
Missouri State	Passing	Deuce Bailey	16/31, 278 yards, TD
Missouri State	Rushing	Shomari Lawrence	11 carries, 63 yards
Missouri State	Receiving	Ramone Green Jr.	1 reception, 76 yards
Middle Tennessee	Passing	Nicholas Vattiato	30/42, 267 yards, 2 TD
Middle Tennessee	Rushing	Jekail Middlebrook	17 carries, 93 yards
Middle Tennessee	Receiving	Cam'ron Lacy	6 receptions, 114 yards, 2 TD

=== at New Mexico State ===
Game Seven – Missouri State Bears (3–3) at New Mexico State Aggies (3–3) – Game summary

Quarter	1	2	3	4	OT	Total
Bears	7	0	10	0	7	24
Aggies	0	7	0	10	0	17

at Aggie Memorial Stadium • Las Cruces, NM

- Date: Wednesday October 22, 2025
- Game time: 8:00 p.m. CDT
- Game weather: Cloudy • Temperature: 73 °F (23 °C) • Wind: NE 4 mph
- Game attendance: 8,790
- Referee: Rodney Burnette
- TV announcers (CBSSN): John Sadak (play-by-play) and Patrick Peterson (analyst)

Game information

First quarter

- (9:45) MOST – Jeron Askren 9-yard pass from Jacob Clark, Yousef Obeid kick (Drive: 9 plays, 75 yards, 5:15; Missouri State 7–0)

Second quarter

- (11:40) NMSU – Isaiah Rudison 4-yard run, Ryan Hawk kick (Drive: 8 plays, 77 yards, 3:57; Tied 7–7)

Third quarter

- (10:45) MOST – Ramone Green Jr. 18-yard pass from Jacob Clark, Yousef Obeid kick (Drive: 5 plays, 58 yards, 3:00; Missouri State 14–7)
- (4:28) MOST – Yousef Obeid 32-yard field goal (Drive: 9 plays, 19 yards, 4:20; Missouri State 17–7)

Fourth quarter

- (5:23) NMSU – Ryan Hawk 25-yard field goal (Drive: 7 plays, 30 yards, 2:17; Missouri State 17–10)
- (1:49) NMSU – Donovan Faupel 11-yard pass from Logan Fife, Ryan Hawk kick (Drive: 5 plays, 65 yards, 0:34; Tied 17–17)

Overtime

- MOST – Ramone Green Jr. 18-yard pass from Jacob Clark, Yousef Obeid kick (Drive: 4 plays, 25 yards, 0:00; Missouri State 24–17)

Statistics	MOST	NMSU
First downs	22	20
Plays–yards	76–409	59–289
Rushes–yards	32–126	25–82
Passing yards	283	207
Passing: Comp–Att–Int	28–44–2	22–34–4
Turnovers	3	4
Time of possession	32:35	27:25

Team	Category	Player	Statistics
Missouri State	Passing	Jacob Clark	28/44, 283 yards, 3 TD, 2 INT
Missouri State	Rushing	Shomari Lawrence	21 carries, 97 yards
Missouri State	Receiving	Ronnel Johnson	6 receptions, 99 yards, TD
New Mexico State	Passing	Logan Fife	22/34, 207 yards, TD, 4 INT
New Mexico State	Rushing	Kadarius Calloway	10 carries, 50 yards
New Mexico State	Receiving	Donovan Faupel	10 receptions, 84 yards, TD

=== vs. FIU ===
Game Eight – FIU Panthers (3–4) at Missouri State Bears (4–3) – Game summary

Quarter	1	2	3	4	Total
Panthers	7	7	0	7	21
Bears	7	7	7	7	28

at Robert W. Plaster Stadium • Springfield, MO

- Date: Wednesday October 29, 2025
- Game time: 7:00 p.m.
- Game weather: Cloudy • Temperature: 47 °F (8 °C) • Wind: N at 15 miles per hour (24 km/h)
- Game attendance: 8,754
- Referee: Reed Brotherton
- TV announcers (CBSSN): Jordan Kent (play-by-play) and Adam Breneman (analyst)

Game information

First quarter

- (8:49) MOST – Shomari Lawrence 3-yard run, Yousef Obeid kick (Drive: 5 plays, 24 yards, 1:46; Missouri State 7-0)
- (1:04) FIU – Dallas Payne 6-yard pass from Keyone Jenkins, Noah Grant kick (Drive: 14 plays, 80 yards, 7:38; Tied 7-7)

Second quarter

- (4:32) MOST – Shomari Lawrence 41-yard run, Yousef Obeid kick (Drive: 6 plays, 68 yards, 2:40; Missouri State 14-7)
- (0:44) FIU – Alex Perry 25-yard pass from Keyone Jenkins, Noah Grant kick (Drive: 11 plays, 75 yards, 3:48; Tied 14-14)

Third quarter

- (6:47) MOST – Jmariyae Robinson 8-yard pass from Jacob Clark, Yousef Obeid kick (Drive: 10 plays, 86 yards, 5:24; Missouri State 21-14)

Fourth quarter

- (8:21) MOST – Jmariyae Robinson 8-yard pass from Jacob Clark, Yousef Obeid kick (Drive: 3 plays, 51 yards, 1:24; Missouri State 28-14)
- (3:29) FIU – JoJo Stone 5-yard pass from Joe Pesansky, Noah Grant kick (Drive: 6 plays, 65 yards, 2:19; Missouri State 28-21)

Statistics	FIU	MOST
First downs	23	18
Plays–yards	71–346	64–369
Rushes–yards	35–115	37–206
Passing yards	231	163
Passing: Comp–Att–Int	22–36–0	16–27–0
Turnovers	2	1
Time of possession	32:01	27:59

Team	Category	Player	Statistics
FIU	Passing	Keyone Jenkins	15/24, 147 yards, 2 TD
FIU	Rushing	Kejon Owens	18 carries, 63 yards
FIU	Receiving	C'quan Jnopierre	3 receptions, 57 yards
Missouri State	Passing	Jacob Clark	16/27, 163 yards, 2 TD
Missouri State	Rushing	Shomari Lawrence	14 carries, 104 yards, 2 TD
Missouri State	Receiving	Makai Cope	2 receptions, 52 yards

=== at Liberty ===
Game Nine – Missouri State Bears (5–3) at Liberty Flames (4–4) – Game summary

Quarter	1	2	3	4	Total
Bears	0	0	7	14	21
Flames	7	3	0	7	17

at Williams Stadium • Lynchburg, VA

- Date: Saturday November 8, 2025
- Game time: 12:00 p.m. CDT
- Game weather: Cloudy • Temperature: 68 °F (20 °C) • Wind: W at 5 miles per hour (8.0 km/h)
- Game attendance: 18,407
- Referee: Douglas Mercer
- TV announcers (ESPN+): Matt Warner (play-by-play), Joe Jauch (analyst) and Annie Cory (sideline)

Game information

First quarter

- (11:24) LIB – Evan Dickens 1-yard run, Jay Billingsley kick (Drive: 7 plays, 75 yards, 3:27; Liberty 7–0)

Second quarter

- (0:00) LIB – Jay Billingsley 38-yard field goal (Drive: 15 plays, 71 yards, 1:48; Liberty 10–0)

Third quarter

- (4:47) MOST – Jmariyae Robinson 28-yard pass from Jacob Clark, Yousef Obeid kick (Drive: 6 plays, 60 yards, 2:07; Liberty 10–7)

Fourth quarter

- (11:54) MOST – Jacob Clark 1-yard run, Yousef Obeid kick (Drive: 8 plays, 80 yards, 4:12; Missouri State 14–10)
- (8:10) LIB – Ethan Vasko 3-yard run, Jay Billingsley kick (Drive: 8 plays, 75 yards, 3:44; Liberty 17–14)
- (0:27) MOST – Tristian Gardner 13-yard pass from Jacob Clark, Yousef Obeid kick (Drive: 4 plays, 70 yards, 1:00; Missouri State 21–17)

Statistics	MOST	LIB
First downs	20	21
Plays–yards	57–332	78–398
Rushes–yards	24–46	43–202
Passing yards	286	196
Passing: Comp–Att–Int	20–33–0	18–35–1
Turnovers	1	2
Time of possession	26:35	33:25

Team	Category	Player	Statistics
Missouri State	Passing	Jacob Clark	20/33 286 yards, 2 TD
Missouri State	Rushing	Shomari Lawrence	13 carries, 48 yards
Missouri State	Receiving	Tristian Gardner	5 receptions, 80 yards, TD
Liberty	Passing	Ethan Vasko	18/35, 196 yards, INT
Liberty	Rushing	Evan Dickens	28 carries, 127 yards, TD
Liberty	Receiving	Reese Smith	4 receptions, 62 yards

=== vs. UTEP ===
Game Ten – UTEP Miners (2–7) at Missouri State Bears (6–3) – Game summary

Quarter	1	2	3	4	Total
Miners	0	7	17	0	24
Bears	10	14	0	14	38

at Robert W. Plaster Stadium • Springfield, MO

- Date: Saturday November 15, 2025
- Game time: 2:00 p.m. CDT
- Game attendance: 13,298
- Referee: Rodney Burnette
- TV announcers (ESPN+): Dom West (play-by-play), Tom Mast (analyst) and Cierra Clark (sideline)

Game information

First quarter

- MOST – Shomari Lawrence 10-yard run (Yousef Obeid kick), 7:43. Bears 7–0. Drive: 8 plays, 80 yards, 3:33.
- MOST – Yousef Obeid 29-yard field goal, 2:15. Bears 10–0. Drive: 10 plays, 39 yards, 3:56.

Second quarter

- MOST – Jeron Askren 9-yard pass from Jacob Clark (Yousef Obeid kick), 6:29. Bears 17–0. Drive: 12 plays, 70 yards, 6:21.
- UTEP – Skyler Locklear 1-yard run (Carlos Arreola kick), 1:56. Bears 17–7. Drive: 10 plays, 75 yards, 4:33.
- MOST – Jeron Askren 2-yard pass from Jacob Clark (Yousef Obeid kick), 0:43. Bears 24–7. Drive: 7 plays, 74 yards, 1:08.

Third quarter

- UTEP – Tanner Cragun 26-yard field goal, 9:52. Bears 24–10. Drive: 9 plays, 28 yards, 3:08.
- UTEP – Skyler Locklear 4-yard run (Carlos Arreola kick), 5:06. Bears 24–17. Drive: 7 plays, 54 yards, 2:50.
- UTEP – Ekow Taylor 0-yard blocked punt return (Carlos Arreola kick), 2:15. Tied 24–24.

Fourth quarter

- MOST – Tristian Gardner 12-yard pass from Jacob Clark (Yousef Obeid kick), 11:09. Bears 31–24. Drive: 12 plays, 75 yards, 6:06.
- MOST – Dash Luke 3-yard pass from Jacob Clark (Yousef Obeid kick), 3:12. Bears 38–24. Drive: 11 plays, 74 yards, 7:02.

Statistics	UTEP	MOST
First downs	17	27
Plays–yards	58–240	78–436
Rushes–yards	29–115	39–106
Passing yards	125	330
Passing: Comp–Att–Int	14–29–0	30–39–0
Turnovers	0	0
Time of possession	22:36	37:24

Team	Category	Player	Statistics
UTEP	Passing	Skyler Locklear	14/29, 125 yards
UTEP	Rushing	Skyler Locklear	16 carries, 56 yards, 2 TD
UTEP	Receiving	Eric Willis III	5 receptions, 45 yards
Missouri State	Passing	Jacob Clark	30/39, 330 yards, 4 TD
Missouri State	Rushing	Shomari Lawrence	25 carries, 109 yards, TD
Missouri State	Receiving	Jmariyae Robinson	7 receptions, 88 yards

=== at Kennesaw State ===
Game Eleven – Missouri State Bears (7–3) at Kennesaw State Owls (7–3) – Game summary

Quarter	1	2	3	4	Total
Bears	3	10	14	7	34
Owls	14	0	13	14	41

at Fifth Third Stadium • Kennesaw, GA

- Date: Saturday November 22, 2025
- Game time: 1:00 p.m. CDT
- Game attendance: 11,040
- Referee: Garrett Dickerson
- TV announcers (ESPN+): Nolan Alexander (play-by-play), Caleb O'Neal (analyst) and Maria Martin (sideline)

Game information

First quarter

- MOST – Yousef Obeid 43-yard field goal, 12:03. Bears 3–0. Drive: 7 plays, 50 yards, 2:57.
- KENN – Clayton Coppock 32-yard pass from Amari Odom (Daniel Kinney kick), 8:46. Owls 7–3. Drive: 9 plays, 85 yards, 3:11.
- KENN – Gabriel Benyard 41-yard pass from Amari Odom (Daniel Kinney kick), 0:35. Owls 14–3. Drive: 10 plays, 80 yards, 4:31.

Second quarter

- MOST – Yousef Obeid 44-yard field goal, 6:19. Owls 14–6. Drive: 12 plays, 71 yards, 6:15.
- MOST – Tristian Gardner 19-yard pass from Jacob Clark (Yousef Obeid kick), 1:09. Owls 14–13. Drive: 5 plays, 80 yards, 0:40.

Third quarter

- MOST – Jmariyae Robinson 10-yard pass from Jacob Clark (Yousef Obeid kick), 9:29. Bears 20–14. Drive: 7 plays, 75 yards, 4:18.
- KENN – Gabriel Benyard 31-yard pass from Amari Odom (Daniel Kinney kick BLOCKED), 5:20. Tied 20–20. Drive: 8 plays, 61 yards, 4:04.
- KENN – Amari Odom 4-yard run (Daniel Kinney kick), 1:41. Owls 27–20. Drive: 5 plays, 34 yards, 2:18.
- MOST – Tristian Gardner 34-yard pass from Jacob Clark (Yousef Obeid kick), 0:24. Tied 27–27. Drive: 3 plays, 75 yards, 1:17.

Fourth quarter

- KENN – Clayton Coppock 26-yard pass from Amari Odom (Daniel Kinney kick), 5:51. Owls 34–27. Drive: 13 plays, 78 yards, 5:06.
- MOST – Shomari Lawrence 70-yard run (Yousef Obeid kick), 5:08. Tied 34–34. Drive: 2 plays, 75 yards, 0:43.
- KENN – Chase Belcher 14-yard pass from Amari Odom (Daniel Kinney kick), 0:27. Owls 41–34. Drive: 3 plays, 61 yards, 0:40.

Statistics	MOST	KENN
First downs	25	26
Plays–yards	62–535	79–500
Rushes–yards	29–191	45–113
Passing yards	344	387
Passing: Comp–Att–Int	23–33–2	24–34–0
Turnovers	2	0
Time of possession	29:21	30:39

Team	Category	Player	Statistics
Missouri State	Passing	Jacob Clark	23/32, 344 yards, 3 TD, 2 INT
Missouri State	Rushing	Shomari Lawrence	20 carries, 173 yards, TD
Missouri State	Receiving	Dash Luke	5 receptions, 73 yards
Kennesaw State	Passing	Amari Odom	24/34, 387 yards, 5 TD
Kennesaw State	Rushing	Amari Odom	16 carries, 32 yards, TD
Kennesaw State	Receiving	Gabriel Benyard	7 receptions, 127 yards, 2 TD

=== vs. Louisiana Tech ===
Game Twelve – Louisiana Tech Bulldogs (6–5) at Missouri State Bears (7–4) – Game summary

Quarter	1	2	3	4	Total
Bulldogs	7	7	7	21	42
Bears	0	10	7	13	30

at Robert W. Plaster Stadium • Springfield, MO

- Date: Saturday November 29, 2025
- Game time: 1:00 p.m. CDT
- Game weather: Rain, 45 °F (7 °C), S 16 mph
- Game attendance: 7,656
- Referee: Ron Hudson
- TV announcers (ESPN+): Don West (play-by-play), Tom Mast (analyst) and Cierra Clark (sideline)

Game information

First quarter

- LT – Andrew Burnette 98-yard run (Kaegan Kent kick), 10:43. Bulldogs 7–0. Drive: 1 play, 98 yards, 0:15.

Second quarter

- LT – Andrew Burnette 1-yard run (Kaegan Kent kick), 13:54. Bulldogs 14–0. Drive: 11 plays, 85 yards, 5:33.
- MOST – Yousef Obeid 42-yard field goal, 6:36. Bulldogs 14–3. Drive: 14 plays, 53 yards, 7:09.
- MOST – Jmariyae Robinson 23-yard pass from Jacob Clark (Yousef Obeid kick), 1:09. Bulldogs 14–10. Drive: 7 plays, 85 yards, 1:16.

Third quarter

- LT – Trey Kukuk 2-yard run (Kaegan Kent kick), 8:18. Bulldogs 21–10. Drive: 5 plays, 49 yards, 2:30.
- MOST – Shomari Lawrence 56-yard run (Yousef Obeid kick), 7:25. Bulldogs 21–17. Drive: 2 plays, 75 yards, 0:53.

Fourth quarter

- LT – Trey Kukuk 2-yard run (Kaegan Kent kick), 14:12. Bulldogs 28–17. Drive: 16 plays, 78 yards, 8:09.
- MOST – Jeron Askren 75-yard pass from Jacob Clark (run failed), 9:30. Bulldogs 28–23. Drive: 1 play, 75 yards, 0:11.
- LT – Devin Gandy 93-yard kickoff return (Kaegan Kent kick), 9:15. Bulldogs 35–23.
- MOST – Ramone Green Jr. 12-yard run (Yousef Obeid kick), 6:44. Bulldogs 35–30. Drive: 6 plays, 75 yards, 2:31.
- LT – Trey Kukuk 58-yard run (Kaegan Kent kick), 3:44. Bulldogs 42–30. Drive: 5 plays, 82 yards, 2:55.

Statistics	LT	MOST
First downs	20	21
Plays–yards	64–475	58–416
Rushes–yards	51–388	27–122
Passing yards	87	294
Passing: Comp–Att–Int	8–13–0	17–31–1
Turnovers	0	1
Time of possession	33:50	26:10

Team	Category	Player	Statistics
Louisiana Tech	Passing	Trey Kukuk	8/13, 97 yards
Louisiana Tech	Rushing	Trey Kukuk	16 carries, 172 yards, 3 TD
Louisiana Tech	Receiving	Clay Thevenin	4 receptions, 60 yards
Missouri State	Passing	Jacob Clark	17/31, 294 yards, 2 TD, INT
Missouri State	Rushing	Shomari Lawrence	13 carries, 84 yards, TD
Missouri State	Receiving	Jeron Askren	1 reception, 75 yards, TD

=== vs. Arkansas State (Xbox Bowl) ===
2025 Xbox Bowl
Missouri State Bears (7–5) vs Arkansas State Red Wolves (6–6) – Game summary

Quarter	1	2	3	4	Total
Bears	7	0	0	21	28
Red Wolves	14	10	7	3	34

at Ford Center at The Star • Frisco, TX

- Date: Thursday, December 18, 2025
- Game time: 8:00 p.m. CDT
- Game weather: None (indoors)
- Game attendance: 7,782
- Referee: Kenneth Ray
- TV announcers (ESPN2): Jorge Sedano (play-by-play), Rodney McLeod (analyst), and Victoria Arlen (sideline)

Game information

First Quarter

- (10:59) ARST – Jaylen Bonelli 7-yard pass from Jaylen Raynor, Clune Van Andel kick (Drive: 5 plays, 55 yards, 2:08; Arkansas State 7–0)
- (2:51) ARST – Corey Rucker 71-yard pass from Jaylen Raynor, Clune Van Andel kick (Drive: 4 plays, 95 yards, 1:10; Arkansas State 14–0)
- (0:17) MOST – Dash Luke 39-yard pass from Jacob Clark, Yousef Obeid kick (Drive: 5 plays, 75 yards, 2:34; Arkansas State 14–7)

Second Quarter

- (12:40) ARST – Clune Van Andel 54-yard field goal (Drive: 9 plays, 28 yards, 2:37; Arkansas State 17–7)
- (6:14) ARST – Chauncey Cobb 4-yard pass from Jaylen Raynor, Clune Van Andel kick (Drive: 4 plays, 44 yards, 1:29; Arkansas State 24–7)

Third Quarter

- (10:22) ARST – Devin Spencer 25-yard run, Clune Van Andel kick (Drive: 5 plays, 65 yards, 1:51; Arkansas State 31–7)

Fourth Quarter

- (14:52) MOST – Ramone Green Jr. 15-yard pass from Jacob Clark, Jeron Askren two-point conversion pass from Jacob Clark (Drive: 12 plays, 90 yards, 6:48; Arkansas State 31–15)
- (12:44) ARST – Clune Van Andel 32-yard field goal (Drive: 6 plays, 56 yards, 2:03; Arkansas State 34–15)
- (5:26) MOST – Dash Luke 47-yard pass from Jacob Clark, two-point pass conversion attempt failed (Drive: 3 plays, 52 yards, 1:23; Arkansas State 34–21)
- (1:54) MOST – Jmariyae Robinson 16-yard pass from Jacob Clark, Yousef Obeid kick (Drive: 4 plays, 80 yards, 1:26; Arkansas State 34–28)

Statistics	MSU	ARST
First downs	23	16
Plays–yards	72–396	56–359
Rushes–yards	37–47	25–71
Passing yards	349	288
Passing: Comp–Att–Int	25–35–0	17–31–0
Turnovers	2	0
Time of possession	39:07	20:53

Team	Category	Player	Statistics
Missouri State	Passing	Jacob Clark	25/35, 349 yards, 4 TD
Missouri State	Rushing	Shomari Lawrence	16 carries, 57 yards
Missouri State	Receiving	Dash Luke	7 receptions, 169 yards, 2 TD
Arkansas State	Passing	Jaylen Raynor	17/31, 288 yards, 3 TD
Arkansas State	Rushing	Kenyon Clay	11 carries, 53 yards
Arkansas State	Receiving	Corey Rucker	6 receptions, 166 yards, TD

== Personnel ==
=== Roster ===
2025 Missouri State Bears football team roster
Players
Coaches
Offense

Pos.	#	Name	Class
WR	0	Jmariyae Robinson	Jr
WR	1	Dash Luke	Sr
RB	2	Shomari Lawrence	Sr
RB	3	Iverson Young	So
WR	5	James BlackStrain	Sr
QB	6	Cole Feuerbacher	So
QB	7	Elijah Leonard	Fr
WR	8	Isaiah McMorris	Fr
WR	9	Ronnel Johnson	Jr
RB	10	King Davis	Fr
WR	11	Makai Cope	Sr
QB	12	Jacob Clark	Sr
WR	13	Liam O'Reilly	Jr
TE	14	Hayden Hagler	Sr
WR	15	Tristian Gardner	Fr
QB	16	Deuce Bailey	Fr
WR	17	Brendon McQueen	Fr
WR	18	Sean Reese	Jr
WR	19	Deamikkio Nathan	Sr
RB	21	Josh Joyner	Fr
RB	22	Ramone Green Jr.	So
QB	23	Eain Finkley	So
RB	28	Reggie Branch II	Sr
WR	34	Jordan Manuel	Fr
RB	39	Sage White	Jr
RB	40	Connor Lair	Jr
OL	51	Ebubedike Nnabugwu	So
OL	54	Matthew Greene	So
OL	55	Ryan Mitchell	Fr
OL	58	Hutson Lillibridge	Sr
OL	66	Makhete Gueye	Jr
OL	67	Ben Liedtke	So
OL	69	Armend Ujkashi	Jr
OL	70	Justin Curtis	Sr
OL	71	Cash Hudson	Jr
OL	72	Mark Hutchinson	Sr
OL	73	Myles Ewell	Fr
OL	74	Erick Cade	Sr
OL	75	Logan Scrivner	Fr
OL	75	Cristian Loaiza	Jr
OL	77	Noah Gardner	So
OL	78	Brayden Thompson	Fr
OL	79	Stephen Meitz	Fr
WR	81	A. J. Bell Jr.	Fr
WR	82	Brycen Dorsey	Fr
WR	83	Amare Whetsell	Fr
WR	84	Antonio Robinson	Jr
TE	85	Dillon Hipp	Fr
TE	86	James Rexroat	Fr
TE	87	Gary Clinton	Sr
TE	88	Jeron Askren	Fr
TE	89	Jackson Kohl	Fr

Defense

Pos.	#	Name	Class
S	0	Maguire Neal	Sr
S	2	Antonio Smith	So
S	3	Khalil Anderson	Sr
CB	5	Navonn Barrett	So
LB	6	Jared Lloyd	Jr
DL	7	D. J. Wesolak	Jr
CB	8	Brandon Vines	Sr
CB	9	Dylan Dixson	Jr
CB	10	Dylan Simmons	Sr
LB	11	Braxton Starnes	Fr
CB	12	Jordan Dunbar	Sr
S	13	Hayden Caston	Fr
CB	14	Thomas Anderson	Sr
LB	15	Martavis Blackmon	Jr
S	16	J. J. O'Neal	Sr
DL	17	Davon Townley Jr.	Sr
CB	18	Don Quist	Fr
LB	19	Jalen Brooks	Sr
CB	20	Floyd Williams	So
LB	21	Jashawn Cooper	So
LB	22	Grayson Cutchlow	Fr
CB	23	Gionni McBride	Fr
LB	24	Caleb Olabode	Fr
CB	25	Camron Williams	Fr
CB	26	Darryon Taylor	Jr
CB	27	Devin Rutherford	Fr
CB	28	Joseph Arnold	Fr
S	29	Christian Ford	So
DL	30	Caden Wiest	So
LB	31	Cooper Roy	So
LB	32	Heiko Malone	Fr
CB	33	Ryan Grayson	Fr
LB	35	Austin Yelder	So
DL	43	Caleb Dietlin	Sr
LB	44	Kanye Young	Sr
DL	50	Mitchell Toney	So
DL	55	Ahmad Poole	Jr
DL	56	Jayden McGee	Fr
DL	57	Gilles Tchio	Jr
DL	90	Sterling Smithson	Sr
DL	91	Tim Brantley Jr.	Jr
DL	94	Breylon McCuller	Fr
DL	96	Kheaton Kinney	Fr
DL	97	Andrew Link	So
DL	98	Dezmond Barnes	Fr
DL	99	Ryan Williams	Sr

Special teams

Pos.	#	Name	Class
K/P	25	Stewart McDonald	Fr
K	36	Yousef Obeid	So
K	37	Josh Deal	So
P	45	Anthony Frederique	Sr
LS	47	Andrew Kallas	So
LS	93	Mitch Weisenborn	Fr

Head coach

- Ryan Beard

Coordinators/assistant coaches

- L. D. Scott – Defensive coordinator/defensive linemen
- Nick Petrino – Offensive coordinator/quarterbacks
- Michael Downing – Special teams coordinator/outside linebackers
- Wesley Satterfield – Special teams coordinator/tight ends
- Max Halpin – Offensive linemen
- Tramain Thomas – Safeties
- Chris Franklin – Cornerbacks
- Ace Wales – Running backs
- Davis Clowney IV – Wide receivers
- Connor Benado – Linebackers
- Hunter Crabtree – Offensive quality control
- Drew Zaubi – Offensive quality control
- Austin Gilbert – Offensive quality control
- Dalton Franks – Defensive assistant
- Carter Barnard – Graduate assistant
- Austin Westbrook – Graduate assistant
- Canaan Yarro – Graduate assistant

Legend

- (C) Team captain
- (S) Suspended
- (I) Ineligible
- Injured
- Redshirt

Roster
Last update: 8/29/25

=== Transfers ===
==== Outgoing ====
Player	Position	Destination
Lemondre Joe	DB	Colorado State
Ryan Boyd	WR	Lindenwood
Jayden Becks	RB	North Texas
Tahj Chambers	LB	Ole Miss
Michael Teason	LB	TCU
Avery Powell	DB	Temple
Kaleno Levine	CB	Troy
Dallas Winner-Johnson	LB	Tulane
Lance Mason	TE	Wisconsin
Brock Bagozzi	QB	Northern State
Jaquez Smith	WR	Southwest Baptist

==== Incoming ====
Player	Position	Previous school
Christian Ford	DB	Arkansas
James Rexroat	TE	Arkansas State
Anthony Frederique	P	Bethune–Cookman
Jordan Dunbar	DB	Bowling Green
Jalen Brooks	LB	Campbell
Maguire Neal	LB	Charlotte
Ebubedike Nnabugwu	OL	Delaware State
Drew Viotto	QB	Eastern Michigan
Shomari Lawrence	RB	FIU
Antonio Smith	DB	Florida Atlantic
Myles Ewell	OL	Kansas
Navonn Barrett	DB	Lackawanna
Makhete Gueye	OL	Louisville
Grayson Cutchlow	LB	Missouri
Isaiah McMorris	WR	Nebraska
Sean Weigand	LS	Northern Illinois
Dillon Hipp	TE	Ole Miss
DJ Wesolak	DE	Oregon State
Ronnel Johnson	WR	Stetson
Matthew Greene	OL	UNLV
Josh Joyner	RB	Washington State
