= Ryan Beard =

American football player and coach (born 1989)

Current position
- Title: Head coach
- Team: Coastal Carolina
- Conference: Sun Belt
- Record: 4–7

Biographical details
- Born: June 3, 1989 (age 37); Bowling Green, Kentucky, U.S.

Playing career
- 2007–2011: Western Kentucky
- Position: Defensive back

Coaching career (HC unless noted)
- 2012–2013: Western Kentucky (DGA)
- 2014: Louisville (DQC)
- 2015: Northern Michigan (DB)
- 2016: Western Kentucky (DB)
- 2017–2018: Louisville (asst.)
- 2019: Central Michigan (ST/S)
- 2020–2022: Missouri State (DC/S)
- 2023–2025: Missouri State
- 2026–present: Coastal Carolina

Head coaching record
- Overall: 23–23

Ryan Beard (born June 3, 1989) is an American college football coach and former player. He is the head football coach for Coastal Carolina University. He played college football at Western Kentucky and previously coached at Western Kentucky, Louisville, Northern Michigan, and Central Michigan. He was hired as the defensive coordinator at Missouri State in 2020 and was promoted to head coach before the 2023 season.

== Early life and education ==
A native of Bowling Green, Kentucky, Beard attended Bowling Green High School where he played football for four seasons and helped them reach the Class 3A championship twice. He began playing college football for the Western Kentucky Hilltoppers in 2007 as a defensive back and was an all-freshman selection. Beard became a starter in 2008. He graduated following the 2011 season and has two degrees from Western Kentucky: a Bachelor of Science in business management and a Master of Science in recreation and sports administration. He was twice named All-Sun Belt Conference in his time with the Hilltoppers and was also an all-academic selection, additionally being given the school's "Iron Man Award" as a senior after posting 51 stops. His career-high in tackles came as a junior in 2010, when he recorded 71.

== Coaching career ==
Beard began his coaching career immediately after graduating from Western Kentucky, serving as the Hilltoppers' defensive graduate assistant from 2012 to 2013. He served as the defensive quality control coach for the Louisville Cardinals in 2014, and after one season in that position, became an assistant at Northern Michigan, working with the cornerbacks.

Beard was to serve as Northern Michigan secondary coach in 2016, but left for Western Kentucky in July of that year. He served as their defensive backs coach for one season. In 2017, he returned to Louisville, where he served as an assistant for two seasons. Beard coached the special teams and safeties at Central Michigan in 2019.

Beard was named defensive coordinator and safeties coach for the Missouri State Bears in 2020. In his first season in the position, he helped them set the school record for single-season sacks and reach the playoffs for the first time in 30 years. The next year, the Bears defense again broke the single-season sack record and they made the playoffs for the second consecutive year. Following the 2022 season, where Missouri State went 5–6 and missed the playoffs, Beard was named the new head coach.

On December 11, 2025, after leading Missouri State to a 7–5 record in their first year in FBS, Beard was hired to become the head coach at Coastal Carolina, succeeding Tim Beck.

== Personal life ==
Beard is married to Katie, the daughter of Bobby Petrino, whom Beard succeeded as Missouri State head coach in 2023. As of 2022, they have four children together.

== Head coaching record ==
Year	Team	Overall	Conference	Standing	Bowl/playoffs
Missouri State Bears (Missouri Valley Football Conference) (2023–2024)
2023	Missouri State	4–7	3–5	9th	
2024	Missouri State	8–4	6–2	T–4th	
Missouri State Bears (Conference USA) (2025)
2025	Missouri State	7–5	5–3	T–4th	Xbox*
Missouri State:		19–16	14–10	*Left for Coastal Carolina prior to bowl game	
Coastal Carolina Chanticleers (Sun Belt Conference) (2026–present)
2026	Coastal Carolina	4–7	3–4		
Coastal Carolina:		4–7	3–4		
Total:		23–23			
