= Shomari Lawrence =

American gridiron football player (born 2001)

- Lawrence with the Montreal Alouettes in 2026

No. 35 – Montreal Alouettes
- Position: Running back
- Roster status: Active
- CFL status: American

Personal information
- Born: November 28, 2001 (age 24); Jamaica
- Listed height: 6 ft 0 in (1.83 m)
- Listed weight: 217 lb (98 kg)

Career information
- High school: Blanche Ely (Pompano Beach, Florida, U.S.)
- College: South Dakota (2020–2022); FIU (2023–2024); Missouri State (2025)
- NFL draft: 2026: undrafted

Career history
- Montreal Alouettes (2026–present)

Awards and highlights
- Second-team All-CUSA (2025)
- Stats at CFL.ca

Shomari Dakari Lawrence (born November 28, 2001) is an American professional football running back for the Montreal Alouettes of the Canadian Football League (CFL). He played college football for the South Dakota Coyotes, FIU Panthers and Missouri State Bears.

== College career ==
Lawrence played college football for the South Dakota Coyotes from 2020 to 2022, the FIU Panthers from 2023 to 2024 and the Missouri State Bears in 2025. He began his career for the FCS University of South Dakota, leading the team in rushing before sustaining a season-ending injury early on in his second year. After returning from injury, Lawrence was named to the Missouri Valley Football Conference (MVFC) All-Newcomer team and finished as the Coyote’s second-leading rusher with 597 yards on 107 carries with three touchdowns.

Following the 2022 season, Lawrence transferred to Florida International University and was a starter in 2023, recording 566 yards and four touchdowns along with eight receptions for 47 yards. His role was significantly scaled back in 2024, only rushing for 177 yards. Lawrence transferred after the season, landing at Missouri State University.

Lawrence had career year in 2025 rushing 199 times for 1,021 yards and seven touchdowns, adding 19 catches for 119 yards. Against his former team, FIU, he rushed for 104 yards and two touchdowns in a 28–21 win. Lawrence earned second-team All-Conference USA honors.

== Professional career ==
Pre-draft measurables
Height	Weight	Arm length	Hand span	Wingspan	40-yard dash	10-yard split	20-yard split	20-yard shuttle	Three-cone drill	Vertical jump	Broad jump	Bench press
5 ft 11 1/4 in (1.81 m)	211 lb (96 kg)	30 3/4 in (0.78 m)	9 in (0.23 m)	6 ft 1 5/8 in (1.87 m)	4.69 s	1.67 s	2.67 s	4.86 s	7.63 s	27.5 in (0.70 m)	9 ft 1 in (2.77 m)	15 reps
All values from Pro Day

After going undrafted in the 2026 NFL draft, Lawrence signed with the Montreal Alouettes of the Canadian Football League (CFL) as an undrafted free agent. He made his debut against the Hamilton Tiger-Cats in the first game of the season, rushing eight times for 63 yards, including two 13 yards runs in overtime to secure the win and recorded three receptions for seven yards.

== Career statistics ==
Legend
**Bold**	Career high

=== College ===
Year	Team	Games		Rushing				Receiving			
Year	Team	GP	GS	Att	Yds	Avg	TD	Rec	Yds	Avg	TD
2020	South Dakota	2	0	2	9	4.5	0	0	0	—	0
2021	South Dakota	4	0	33	160	4.9	1	6	77	**12.8**	0
2022	South Dakota	11	1	107	597	**5.6**	3	14	**135**	9.6	**1**
2023	FIU	12	10	125	566	4.5	4	8	47	5.9	0
2024	FIU	8	1	47	177	3.8	1	1	1	1.0	0
2025	Missouri State	**13**	**12**	**199**	**1,021**	5.1	**7**	**19**	118	6.2	0
Career		50	24	513	2,530	4.9	16	48	378	7.9	1
