= Jacob Clark =

American football player (born 2000)

Profile
- Position: Quarterback

Personal information
- Born: November 1, 2000 (age 26); Kansas City, Missouri, U.S.
- Listed height: 6 ft 5 in (1.96 m)
- Listed weight: 220 lb (100 kg)

Career information
- High school: Rockwall (Rockwall, Texas)
- College: Minnesota (2019–2021); Missouri State (2022–2025)
- NFL draft: 2026: undrafted

Career history
- Las Vegas Raiders (2026)*
- * Offseason or practice squad member only

Awards and highlights
- First-team All-MVFC (2024); Second-team All-CUSA (2025)

Jacob Clark (born November 1, 2000) is an American professional football quarterback. He played college football for the Minnesota Golden Gophers and Missouri State Bears. He was signed as an undrafted free agent by the Las Vegas Raiders in 2026, where he spent the off-season.

== Early life ==
Clark was born on November 1, 2000, in Kansas City, Missouri. He attended Rockwall High School in Texas where he played football as a quarterback and was the District 11 Offensive Player of the Year in his senior season. He threw for 2,937 yards and 29 touchdowns while running for seven touchdowns as a junior and posted 3,295 passing yards, 31 passing touchdowns and 10 rushing touchdowns as a senior. Clark, ranked a four-star recruit and a top-15 pro-style quarterback recruit, finished his high school career with 6,232 passing yards and 60 touchdowns. He committed to play college football for the Minnesota Golden Gophers.

== College career ==
As a true freshman in 2019, Clark appeared in one game for the Golden Gophers and completed a pass for 39 yards. He saw no playing time in the next two seasons. In 2020, he was selected Academic All-Big Ten Conference. In 2022, Clark transferred to the Missouri State Bears. He threw for 72 yards as a backup in 2022 before winning the starting job in 2023, throwing for 1,018 yards, 10 touchdowns and two interceptions before an injury ended his season.

Clark returned from injury in 2024 and started every game, becoming a finalist for the Walter Payton Award as the best offensive player at the NCAA Division I FCS level. He completed 262 of 373 passes for 3,604 yards and 26 touchdowns with six interceptions, being named first-team All-Missouri Valley Football Conference (MVFC), placing third in voting for the conference Player of the Year award, and setting Missouri State records for single-season completions, passing yards and touchdowns. Clark returned to Missouri State, now in Conference USA of the FBS, for his final season in 2025. He started 12 games and was named honorable mention All-Conference USA while throwing for 3,244 yards and 28 touchdowns to 11 interceptions, again breaking the school record for single-season touchdown passes. Clark led the Bears to an appearance in the 2025 Xbox Bowl and finished his college career as the school's all-time leader in passing touchdowns with 64. At the conclusion of his collegiate career, he was invited to The American Bowl, where he led his team's game-winning drive and was named Offensive MVP.

== Professional career ==
Pre-draft measurables
Height	Weight	Arm length	Hand span	Wingspan
6 ft 4 7/8 in (1.95 m)	230 lb (104 kg)	32 1/2 in (0.83 m)	10 1/8 in (0.26 m)	6 ft 5 7/8 in (1.98 m)
All values from Pro Day

After going unselected in the 2026 NFL draft, Clark signed with the Las Vegas Raiders as an undrafted free agent. He was waived by the Raiders as a part of final roster cuts on August 30, 2026.

== Career statistics ==
=== College ===
Season	Team	Games			Passing								Rushing			
Season	Team	GP	GS	Record	Cmp	Att	Pct	Yds	Y/A	TD	Int	Rtg	Att	Yds	Avg	TD
2019	Minnesota	1	0	—	1	1	100.0	39	39.0	0	0	427.6	0	0	0.0	0
2020	Minnesota	0	0	—	DNP											
2021	Minnesota	0	0	—	DNP											
2022	Missouri State	1	0	—	9	11	81.8	72	6.5	0	0	136.8	0	0	0.0	0
2023	Missouri State	4	4	1–3	66	105	62.9	1,018	9.7	10	2	171.9	25	73	2.9	0
2024	Missouri State	12	12	8–4	262	376	69.7	3,604	9.6	26	6	169.8	80	4	0.1	1
2025	Missouri State	12	12	6–6	247	376	65.7	3,244	8.6	28	11	156.9	94	-16	-0.2	3
Career		30	28	15–13	584	869	67.2	7,977	9.2	64	19	144.3	199	61	0.3	4
