= 2020 Lamar Cardinals football team =

American college football season

2020 Lamar Cardinals football
- Conference: Southland Conference
- Record: 2–4 (2–4 Southland)
- Head coach: Blane Morgan (1st season)
- Co-offensive coordinators: Patrick Covington (1st season); Ron Antoine (1st season)
- Offensive scheme: Multiple
- Defensive coordinator: Matt Weikert (1st season)
- Base defense: 3–4
- Home stadium: Provost Umphrey Stadium

2020 Southland Conference football standings
	Conf.			Overall
Team	W		L	W		L
No. 1 Sam Houston State $^	6	–	0	10	–	0
No. 20 Southeastern Louisiana	4	–	2	4	–	3
No. 23 Nicholls	3	–	3	4	–	3
Incarnate Word	3	–	3	3	–	3
Lamar	2	–	4	2	–	4
McNeese State*	2	–	4	3	–	4
Northwestern State	1	–	5	1	–	5
$ – Conference champion; ^ – FCS playoff participant; * – Ineligible for FCS postseason play due to NCAA sanctions Note: Abilene Christian, Central Arkansas, Houston Baptist, and Stephen F. Austin played only in the fall and opted out of the spring season.; Rankings from STATS Poll

The 2020 Lamar Cardinals football team represented Lamar University in the 2020–21 NCAA Division I FCS football season as a member of the Southland Conference. The Cardinals were led by first-year head coach Blane Morgan and played their home games at Provost Umphrey Stadium. Originally scheduled to play an eleven-game regular season schedule in 2020, the Cardinals played shortened 6 game schedule in Spring 2021 with all games against conference members due to the COVID19 Pandemic. The Cardinals finished the season with a 2–4 overall record. The conference record was also 2–4 tied for fifth place with McNeese.

== Preseason ==
=== Recruiting ===
Back	B	Center	C	Cornerback	CB	Defensive back	DB
Defensive end	DE	Defensive lineman	DL	Defensive tackle	DT	End	E
Fullback	FB	Guard	G	Halfback	HB	Kicker	K
Kickoff returner	KR	Offensive tackle	OT	Offensive lineman	OL	Linebacker	LB
Long snapper	LS	Punter	P	Punt returner	PR	Quarterback	QB
Running back	RB	Safety	S	Tight end	TE	Wide receiver	WR

College recruiting information (2020)
Name	Hometown	School	Height	Weight	40^{‡}	Commit date
Jakevian Wilson; DT	Beaumont, Texas	Beaumont United	6 ft 2 in (1.88 m)	295 lb (134 kg)	–	
Jakevian Wilson; DT	Recruit ratings: No ratings found					
Darrell Bush; RB	Gilmer, TX	Gilmer	5 ft 9 in (1.75 m)	210 lb (95 kg)	–	
Darrell Bush; RB	Recruit ratings: No ratings found					
Ko Clark; DB	Houma, LA	Terrebonne High School	5 ft 11 in (1.80 m)	180 lb (82 kg)	–	
Ko Clark; DB	Recruit ratings: No ratings found					
Timothy Conerly; ATH	New Orleans, LA	Sophie B. Wright Charter School	5 ft 9 in (1.75 m)	165 lb (75 kg)	–	
Timothy Conerly; ATH	Recruit ratings: No ratings found					
Jacob Dicharry; OL	Dallas, TX	J. J. Pearce High School	6 ft 5 in (1.96 m)	240 lb (110 kg)	–	
Jacob Dicharry; OL	Recruit ratings: No ratings found					
Efosa Evbuomwan; LB	Leesville, LA	Leesville High School	6 ft 1 in (1.85 m)	200 lb (91 kg)	4.37	
Efosa Evbuomwan; LB	Recruit ratings: No ratings found					
Jacob Fex; DB	McKinney, TX	McKinney Boyd High School	6 ft 0 in (1.83 m)	185 lb (84 kg)	–	
Jacob Fex; DB	Recruit ratings: No ratings found					
Devyn Gibbs; TE	Mabank, TX	Mabank High School	6 ft 4 in (1.93 m)	210 lb (95 kg)	–	
Devyn Gibbs; TE	Recruit ratings: No ratings found					
Carson Harris; ATH	Carrollton, TX	Hebron High School	6 ft 1 in (1.85 m)	210 lb (95 kg)	–	
Carson Harris; ATH	Recruit ratings: No ratings found					
Jaylon Jackson; RB	Burleson, TX	Burleson Centennial High School	5 ft 7 in (1.70 m)	165 lb (75 kg)	–	
Jaylon Jackson; RB	Recruit ratings: 247Sports:					
Caimyn Layne; LB	Waxahachie, TX	All Saints Episcopal School	6 ft 0 in (1.83 m)	235 lb (107 kg)	–	
Caimyn Layne; LB	Recruit ratings: No ratings found					
Jacob Loganbill; OL	Van Alstyne, TX	Van Alstyne High School	6 ft 4 in (1.93 m)	300 lb (140 kg)	–	
Jacob Loganbill; OL	Recruit ratings: No ratings found					
Marcques Mayo; OL	Opelousas, LA	Northwest High School	6 ft 3 in (1.91 m)	245 lb (111 kg)	–	
Marcques Mayo; OL	Recruit ratings: No ratings found					
Adan Pavon; OL	Willis, TX	Conroe High School	6 ft 3 in (1.91 m)	285 lb (129 kg)	–	
Adan Pavon; OL	Recruit ratings: No ratings found					
Vencent Rockwell; LB	Longview, TX	Spring Hill High School	6 ft 2 in (1.88 m)	220 lb (100 kg)	–	
Vencent Rockwell; LB	Recruit ratings: No ratings found					
Kendal Rowen; LB	Marrero, LA	St. Augustine High School	6 ft 2 in (1.88 m)	215 lb (98 kg)	–	
Kendal Rowen; LB	Recruit ratings: No ratings found					
LaTrell Smith; DT	Dallas, TX	Lake Highlands High School	6 ft 1 in (1.85 m)	280 lb (130 kg)	–	
LaTrell Smith; DT	Recruit ratings: No ratings found					
Gabriel Stonewall; WR	El Paso, TX	Franklin High School	6 ft 3 in (1.91 m)	176 lb (80 kg)	–	
Gabriel Stonewall; WR	Recruit ratings: 247Sports:					
Devin Thomas; DB	Saginaw, TX	Nolan Catholic High School	6 ft 0 in (1.83 m)	180 lb (82 kg)	–	
Devin Thomas; DB	Recruit ratings: No ratings found					
Chidera Umeh; DE	Richmond, TX	St. Thomas High School	6 ft 4 in (1.93 m)	255 lb (116 kg)	–	
Chidera Umeh; DE	Recruit ratings: No ratings found					
Connor Venetis; TE	Lafayette, LA	Southside High School	6 ft 5 in (1.96 m)	240 lb (110 kg)	–	
Connor Venetis; TE	Recruit ratings: No ratings found					
Ja'Darrius Winans; OL	Minden, LA	Minden High School	6 ft 3 in (1.91 m)	315 lb (143 kg)	–	
Ja'Darrius Winans; OL	Recruit ratings: No ratings found					
Jalen Dummett; QB	Oakland, CA	Oakland High School/Feather River College	6 ft 2 in (1.88 m)	220 lb (100 kg)	–	
Jalen Dummett; QB	Recruit ratings: No ratings found					
Marcus Harry; OL	Longview, TX	Longview High School/Tyler JC	6 ft 3 in (1.91 m)	285 lb (129 kg)	–	
Marcus Harry; OL	Recruit ratings: No ratings found					
Tylo Phillips; DE	Collinsville, MS	West Lauderdale High School/Hinds CC	6 ft 3 in (1.91 m)	290 lb (130 kg)	–	
Tylo Phillips; DE	Recruit ratings: No ratings found					
Seth Wood; LB	Lubbock, TX	Coronado High School/Cisco College	6 ft 1 in (1.85 m)	245 lb (111 kg)	–	
Seth Wood; LB	Recruit ratings: No ratings found					
Overall recruit ranking:
Note: In many cases, Scout, Rivals, 247Sports, On3, and ESPN may conflict in their listings of height and weight.; In these cases, the average was taken. ESPN grades are on a 100-point scale.; Sources: "2020 Team Ranking". Rivals.com.

=== Spring practice and Spring game ===
Lamar Football announced on February 21 over its Twitter account that Spring practice will start on March 25. Fourteen sessions have been scheduled. The Spring game, scheduled for April 25, will conclude the sessions. The Spring game was canceled on March 19, 2020 as a result of the COVID-19 pandemic.

=== Preseason poll ===
The Southland Conference released their spring preseason poll in January 2021. The Cardinals were picked to finish seventh in the conference. In addition, two Cardinals were chosen to the Preseason All-Southland Team

=== Preseason All–Southland Teams ===
Offense

1st Team

- Bailey Giffen – Kicker, SR

Defense

1st Team

- Michael Lawson – Defensive Back, SR
- Michael Lawson – Punt Returner, SR

== Schedule ==
Date	Time	Opponent	Site	TV	Result	Attendance
February 27	3:00 p.m.	at No. 9 Nicholls	Manning Field at John L. Guidry Stadium; Thibodaux, LA		L 0–55	3,000
March 6	3:00 p.m.	Incarnate Word	Provost Umphrey Stadium; Beaumont, TX		L 20–42	3,201
March 13	12:00 p.m.	at McNeese State	Cowboy Stadium; Lake Charles, LA (Battle of the Border)	ESPN+	W 27–26	4,523
March 20	6:00 p.m.	No. 7 Sam Houston State	Provost Umphrey Stadium; Beaumont, TX	ESPN+	L 7–62	2,845
March 27	3:00 p.m.	Northwestern State	Provost Umphrey Stadium; Beaumont, TX	ESPN+	W 31–23	3,833
April 3	6:00 p.m.	at No. 25 Southeastern Louisiana	Strawberry Stadium; Hammond, LA	ESPN+	L 12–42	2,548
Rankings from STATS Poll released prior to the game; All times are in Central time

== Game summaries ==
=== At Nicholls ===
Lamar at Nicholls

Team	1	2	3	4	Total
Cardinals	0	0	0	0	0
• No. 9 Colonels	13	21	21	0	55

- Date: February 27, 2021
- Location: Manning Field at John L. Guidry Stadium
  Thibodaux, LA
- Game start: 3:06 p.m. CST
- Elapsed time: 2 hours and 55 minutes
- Game attendance: 3,000
- Game weather: 80 °F (27 °C) • Weather: Cloudy • Wind: SSE 17 MPH
- Referee: Scott Hardin
- Television network: ESPN+

Scoring summary
1	11:38	NICH	Lindsey Scott Jr. 33-yard rush (Gavin Lasseigne PAT failed) (9 plays, 75 yards, 3:22)	NICH 6–0
1	07:08	NICH	K. J. Franklin 23-yard pass from Lindsey Scott Jr. (Gavin Lasseigne kick) (5 plays, 66 yards, 1:57)	NICH 13–0
2	13:34	NICH	Troy Hurst 28-yard pass from Lindsey Scott Jr. (Gavin Lasseigne kick)br/>(10 plays, 85 yards, 3:51)	NICH 20–0
2	05:50	NICH	Julien Gums 2-yard rush (Gavin Lasseigne kick) (6 plays, 72 yards, 2:34)	NICH 27–0
2	00:27	NICH	Lindsey Scott Jr. 7-yard rush (Gavin Lasseigne kick) (11 plays, 61 yards, 2:35)	NICH 34–0
3	10:59	NICH	Dontaze Costly 45-yard pass from Lindsey Scott Jr. (Gavin Lasseigne kick) (4 plays, 63 yards, 1:55)	NICH 41–0
3	06:47	NICH	Lindsey Scott Jr. 5-yard rush (Gavin Lasseigne kick) (6 plays, 58 yards, 2:28)	NICH 48–0
3	02:41	NICH	John Carrington III 4-yard rush (Gavin Lasseigne kick) (5 plays, 65 yards, 1:52)	NICH 55–0

Statistics	LAM	NICH
First downs	6	31
Total yards	91	639
Rushing yards	37	392
Passing yards	54	247
Turnovers	0	0
Time of possession	30:34	29:26

Team	Category	Player	Statistics
Lamar	Passing	Jalen Dummett	9/11, 40 yards
Lamar	Rushing	Jaylen Jackson	8 carries, 19 yards
Lamar	Receiving	Marcellus Johnson	3 receptions, 14 yards
Nicholls	Passing	Lindsey Scott Jr.	16/21, 232 yards, 3 TD
Nicholls	Rushing	Lindsey Scott Jr.	10 carries, 108 yards, 3 TD
Nicholls	Receiving	K. J. Franklin	5 receptions, 65 yards, TD

=== Incarnate Word ===
Incarnate Word at Lamar

Team	1	2	3	4	Total
• UIW Cardinals	14	7	14	7	42
LAM Cardinals	7	10	3	0	20

- Date: April 6, 2021
- Location: Provost Umphrey Stadium
  Beaumont, TX
- Game start: 3:00 p.m. CDT
- Elapsed time: 3 hours and 11 minutes
- Game attendance: 3,201
- Game weather: 67 °F (19 °C) • Weather: Clear Skies • Wind: NNE 8 MPH
- Referee: Ed Bourgeois

Scoring summary
1	09:17	LAMR	Jeremy Davis 5-yard pass from Jalen Dummett (Bailey Giffen kick) (7 plays, 66 yards, 3:33)	LAMR 7–0
1	08:22	UIW	Kevin Brown 66-yard rush (Carson Mohr kick) (3 plays, 75 yards, 0:55)	TIE 7–7
1	01:29	UIW	Kevin Brown 20-yard pass from Cam Ward (Carson Mohr kick) (8 plays, 78 yards, 2:26)	UIW 14–7
2	11:48	LAMR	Chaz Ward 2-yard rush (Bailey Giffen kick) (10 plays, 75 yards, 4:41)	TIE 14–14
2	03:03	LAMR	Bailey Giffen 49-yard field goal (12 plays, 54 yards, 6:31)	LAMR 17–14
2	01:14	UIW	Darion Chafin 4-yard pass from Cameron Ward (Carson Mohr kick) (7 plays, 63 yards, 1:40)	UIW 21–17
3	11:07	UIW	Cameron Ward 1-yard rush (Carson Mohr kick) (11 plays, 84 yards, 3:48)	UIW 28–17
3	04:27	LAMR	Bailey Giffen 46-yard field goal (12 plays, 54 yards, 6:31)	UIW 28–20
3	00:35	UIW	Robert Ferrel 17-yard pass from Cameron Ward (Carson Mohr kick) (12 plays, 83 yards, 3:45)	UIW 35–20
4	07:29	UIW	Jaelin Campbell 21-yard pass from Cameron Ward (Carson Mohr kick) (3 plays, 26 yards, 1:02)	UIW 42–20

Statistics	UIW	LAM
First downs	28	21
Total yards	626	360
Rushing yards	285	196
Passing yards	341	164
Turnovers	2	3
Time of possession	21:22	38:38

Team	Category	Player	Statistics
Incarnate Word	Passing	Cam Ward	29/44, 341 yards, 4 TD, 2 INT
Incarnate Word	Rushing	Kevin Brown	13 carries, 196 yards, TD
Incarnate Word	Receiving	Jaelin Campbell	4 receptions, 78 yards, TD
Lamar	Passing	Jalen Dummett	9/14, 116 yards, 1TD, INT
Lamar	Rushing	Chaz Ward	26 carries, 105 yards, TD
Lamar	Receiving	Marcellus Johnson	7 receptions, 88 yards

=== At McNeese State ===
Lamar at McNeese State

Team	1	2	3	4	Total
Cardinals	3	10	0	7	20
Cowboys	13	0	0	7	20

- Date: March 13, 2021
- Location: Cowboy Stadium
  Lake Charles, LA
- Game start: 12:00 p.m. CST
- Elapsed time: 3 hours and 30 minutes
- Game attendance: 4,523
- Referee: Dan Lewis
- Television network: ESPN+

Scoring summary
1	11:05	MCNS	Mason Pierce 80-yard rush (Jacob Abel kick) (1 play, 80 yards, 0:15)	MCNS 7–0
1	06:31	LAMR	Bailey Giffen 34-yard field goal (8 plays, 58 yards, 4:34)	MCNS 7–3
1	03:52	MCNS	AJ Carter 45-yard rush (Jacob Abel PAT failed) (6 plays, 76 yards, 2:34)	MCNS 13–3
2	09:26	LAMR	Griffin Hammond 13-yard pass from Jalen Dummett (Bailey Giffen kick) (12 plays, 90 yards, 5:52)	MCNS 13–10
2	04:54	LAMR	Bailey Giffen 37-yard field goal (8 play, 27 yards, 2:49)	TIE 13–13
4	12:55	MCNS	Carlos Williams 11-yard rush (Jacob Abel kick) (10 plays, 86 yards, 4:05)	MCNS 20–13
4	04:33	LAMR	Nathan Gaskamp 5-yard pass from Jalen Dummett (Bailey Giffen kick) (9 plays, 53 yards, 4:33)	TIE 20–20
1OT		MCNS	Carlos Williams 5-yard rush (Jacob Abel PAT blocked) (4 plays, 20 yards)	MCNS 26–20
1OT		LAMR	Jalen Dummett 5-yard rush (Bailey Giffen kick) (5 plays, 25 yards)	LAMR 27–26

Statistics	LAM	MCN
First downs	21	18
Total yards	330	399
Rushing yards	223	321
Passing yards	107	78
Turnovers	0	1
Time of possession	38:15	36:45

Team	Category	Player	Statistics
Lamar	Passing	Jalen Dummett	8/11, 100 yards, 2 TD
Lamar	Rushing	Marcellus Johnson	6 carries, 86 yards
Lamar	Receiving	Kirkland Banks	4 receptions, 41 yards
McNeese State	Passing	Cody Orgeron	9/16, 78 yards, INT
McNeese State	Rushing	Carlos Williams	16 carries, 90 yards, 2 TD
McNeese State	Receiving	Jamal Pettigrew	1 reception, 31 yards

=== Sam Houston State ===
Sam Houston State at Lamar

Team	1	2	3	4	Total
• No. 7 Bearkats	7	31	17	7	62
Cardinals	0	0	0	7	7

- Date: March 20, 2021
- Location: Provost Umphrey Stadium
  Beaumont, TX
- Game start: 6:00 p.m. CDT
- Elapsed time: 3 hours and 22 minutes
- Game attendance: 2,845
- Game weather: 65 °F (18 °C) • Weather: Partly Cloudy & Cool • Wind: 8 NE MPH
- Referee: Scott Hardin
- Television network: ESPN+

Scoring summary
1	10:34	SHSU	Eric Schmid 16-yard rush (Seth Morgan kick) (5 plays, 70 yards, 1:27)	SHSU 7–0
2	14:52	SHSU	Jequez Ezzard 35-yard pass from Eric Schmid (Seth Morgan kick) (3 plays, 25 yards, 1:03)	SHSU 14–0
2	13:43	SHSU	Jequez Ezzard 80-yard punt returned (Seth Morgan kick) (3 plays, 1 yard, 1:09)	SHSU 21–0
2	10:20	SHSU	Eric Schmid 9-yard rush (Seth Morgan kick) (3 plays, 58 yards, 0:58)	SHSU 28–0
2	04:10	SHSU	Jequez Ezzard 41-yard pass from Eric Schmid (Seth Morgan kick) (4 plays, 81 yards, 1:15)	SHSU 35–0
2	00:00	SHSU	Seth Morgan 36-yard field goal (7 plays, 56 yards, 1:14)	SHSU 38–0
3	12:16	SHSU	Eric Schmid 10-yard rush (Seth Morgan kick) (8 plays, 75 yards, 2:44)	SHSU 45–0
3	06:06	SHSU	Eric Schmid 5-yard rush (Seth Morgan kick) (8 plays, 69 yards, 3:27)	SHSU 52–0
3	01:12	SHSU	Seth Morgan 44-yard field goal (7 plays, 12 yards, 2:52)	SHSU 55–0
4	13:33	LAMR	Jaylon Jackson 42-yard pass from Austin Scott (Bailey Giffen kick) (5 plays, 79 yards, 2:34)	SHSU 55–7
4	04:59	SHSU	Donovan Williams 29-yard rush (Seth Morgan kick) (6 plays, 82 yards, 3:00)	SHSU 62–7

Statistics	SHSU	LAM
First downs	22	9
Total yards	531	181
Rushing yards	181	28
Passing yards	350	153
Turnovers	4	4
Time of possession	27:57	32:03

Team	Category	Player	Statistics
Sam Houston State	Passing	Eric Schmid	19/29, 343 yards, 2 TD, INT
Sam Houston State	Rushing	Donovan Williams	7 carries, 47 yards, TD
Sam Houston State	Receiving	Jequez Ezzard	4 receptions, 130 yards, 2 TD
Lamar	Passing	Austin Scott	10/19, 123 yards, TD, 2 INT
Lamar	Rushing	Jaylon Jackson	6 carries, 40 yards
Lamar	Receiving	Jaylon Jackson	3 receptions, 66 yards, TD

=== Northwestern State ===
Northwestern State at Lamar

Team	1	2	3	4	Total
Demons	0	7	0	16	23
• Cardinals	14	14	3	0	31

- Date: March 27, 2021
- Location: Provost Umphrey Stadium
  Beaumont, TX
- Game start: 3:00 p.m. CDT
- Elapsed time: 3 hours and 26 minutes
- Game attendance: 3,833
- Game weather: 81 °F (27 °C) • Weather: Cloudy and Humid • Wind: SSE 13 MPH
- Referee: Vidal Jones
- Television network: ESPN+

Scoring summary
1	09:34	LAMR	Chaz Ward 1-yard rush (Bailey Giffen kick) (13 plays, 75 yards, 5:25)	LAMR 7–0
1	04:09	LAMR	Connor Ventis 10-yard pass from Jalen Dummett (Bailey Giffen kick) (8 plays, 73 yards, 4:09)	LAMR 14–0
2	12:12	LAMR	Jalen Dummett 31-yard rush (Bailey Giffen kick) (3 plays, 25 yards, 0:52)	LAMR 21–0
2	04:37	LAMR	Jacoby Davis 0-yard return of blocked punt (Bailey Giffen kick) (3 plays, 0 yards, 0:25)	LAMR 28–0
2	02:42	NSU	Scooter Adams 63-yard rush (Eddie Godina kick) (4 plays, 75 yards, 1:55)	LAMR 28–7
3	05:11	LAMR	Bailey Giffen 43-yard field goal (7 plays, 34 yards, 3:17)	LAMR 31–7
4	12:19	NSU	Scooter Adams 25-yard rush (Bryce Rivers two-point conversion pass to Javon Antonio) (2 plays, 25 yards, 0:15)	LAMR 31–15
4	01:18	NSU	Javon Antonio 9-yard pass from Bryce Rivers (Bryce Rivers two-point conversion pass to Javon Antonio) (5 plays, 80 yards, 0:37)	LAMR 31–23

Statistics	NWST	LAM
First downs	17	19
Total yards	409	358
Rushing yards	215	239
Passing yards	194	119
Turnovers	3	0
Time of possession	19:46	40:14

Team	Category	Player	Statistics
Northwestern State	Passing	Bryce Rivers	7/19, 136 yards, TD
Northwestern State	Rushing	Scooter Adams	18 carries, 212 yards, 2 TD
Northwestern State	Receiving	Marquise Bridges	1 reception, 45 yards
Lamar	Passing	Jalen Dummett	6/12, 94 yards, TD
Lamar	Rushing	Jalen Dummett	13 carries, 84 yards, TD
Lamar	Receiving	Kirkland Banks	2 receptions, 43 yards

=== At Southeastern Louisiana ===
Lamar at Southeastern Louisiana

Team	1	2	3	4	Total
Cardinals	2	10	0	0	12
• No. 25 Lions	7	14	14	7	42

- Date: April 3, 2021
- Location: Strawberry Stadium
  Hammond, LA
- Game start: 6:05 p.m. CDT
- Elapsed time: 3 hours
- Game attendance: 2,548
- Referee: Scott Hardin
- Television network: ESPN+

Scoring summary
1	08:04	SELA	Cole Kelley 1-yard rush (Mateo Rengifo kick) (9 plays, 45 yards, 4:01)	SELA 7–0
1	03:35	LAMR	Team Safety (3 plays, -6 yards, 0:51)	SELA 7–2
2	13:36	LAMR	Nathan Gaskamp 1-yard rush (Bailey Giffen kick) (10 plays, 50 yards, 4:59)	LAMR 9–7
2	12:47	SELA	Tim Wilson Jr. 47-yard pass from Cole Kelley (Mateo Rengifo kick) (2 plays, 63 yards, 0:43)	SELA 14–9
2	07:58	LAMR	Bailey Giffen 31-yard field goal (4 plays, 8 yards, 1:52)	SELA 14–12
2	04:40	SELA	Cole Kelley 1-yard rush (Mateo Rengifo kick) (8 plays, 85 yards, 3:12)	SELA 21–12
3	11:46	SELA	Tim Wilson Jr. 8-yard pass from Cole Kelley (Mateo Rengifo kick) (6 plays, 63 yards, 3:09)	SELA 28–12
3	01:18	SELA	Marcus Cooper 5-yard pass from Cole Kelley (Mateo Rengifo kick) (10 plays, 93 yards, 4:40)	SELA 35–12
4	03:52	SELA	Anthony Spurlock 24-yard pass from Cephus Johnson III (Mateo Rengifo kick) (7 plays, 80 yards, 4:10)	SELA 42–12

Statistics	LAM	SELA
First downs	15	26
Total yards	298	468
Rushing yards	181	123
Passing yards	117	345
Turnovers	2	2
Time of possession	34:26	25:34

Team	Category	Player	Statistics
Lamar	Passing	Jalen Dummett	10/15, 111 yards, 2 INT
Lamar	Rushing	Jaylon Jackson	12 carries, 69 yards
Lamar	Receiving	Kirkland Banks	3 receptions, 36 yards
Southeastern Louisiana	Passing	Cole Kelley	23/31, 321 yards, 3 TD, 2 INT
Southeastern Louisiana	Rushing	Cephus Johnson III	3 carries, 48 yards
Southeastern Louisiana	Receiving	Javon Conner	4 receptions, 70 yards

== Roster ==
2020 Lamar Cardinals football team roster
Players
Coaches
Offense

Pos.	#	Name	Class
WR	2	James Jones	So
WR	3	Carmoni Green	Sr
WR	4	Ryan Matlock	Sr
WR	9	Kendrick King	Sr
WR	12	Marcellus Johnson	So
WR	14	Caisen Sullivan	Sr
WR	19	Kenny Allen	Sr
WR	23	Kirkland Banks	Sr
WR	25	Jack Roe	So
WR	80	Blake Robinson	So
WR	81	Erik Pizarro	So
WR		Gabriel Stonewall	Fr
TE	44	Nathan Gaskamp	RJr
TE	82	Mason Sikes	Sr
TE	84	Keller Houston	Fr
TE	85	Dawud Shorts	Sr
TE	87	Cameron Sir Louis	So
TE	88	Dwight Johnson	Fr
TE		Conner Venetis	Fr
RB	5	Myles Wanza	Sr
RB	30	Amon Byars	Fr
RB	35	Tamauge Sloan	So
RB	36	Jordan Patterson	Fr
RB	38	Chaz Ward	So
RB	88	Dwight Johnson	Fr
RB		Darrell Bush	Fr
RB		Jaylon Jackson	Fr
QB	8	Jermain Givens	So
QB	17	Alex Connell	Fr
QB		Jaylen Dummett	Jr
OL	54	Bless Harris	So
OL	58	Chase Bridgeman	Sr
OL	64	Humberto Lopez	Jr
OL	68	Alexander Frithiof	Fr
OL	70	Colton Peterson	Sr
OL	73	Nick Dunomes	Sr
OL	74	Brian Roy	So
OL	78	Julio Cuello	So
OL		Marcus Harry	So
OL		Jacob Loganbill	Fr
OL		Marcques Mayo	Fr
OL		Adan Pavon	Fr
OL		Ja'Darrius Winans	Fr

Defense

Pos.	#	Name	Class
LB	10	Dallas Martin	Sr
LB	49	David Crosley	Sr
LB	55	Greg Edwards	Fr
LB	57	Tyler Jackson	Fr
LB		Efosa Evbuomwan	Fr
LB		Vencent Rockwell	Fr
LB		Kendal Rowan	Fr
LB		Seth Wood	Fr
DT	42	Reggie Boseman	Sr
DT	56	John Garza	Jr
DT	93	Jevale Roberson	Fr
DT	95	Caleb Williams	Fr
DT	97	Hunter Adams	Jr
DT	98	Joe Glaefke	Fr
DT	99	Brandon Arnold	Sr
DT		LaTrell Smith	Fr
DT		Jakevian Wilson	Fr
DE	7	Davion May	Sr
DE	34	Abel Daily	Jr
DE	52	Caleb Oden	Jr
DE	60	Paul Ivory	So
DE	61	Tommy Parker	Fr
DE	91	Aaron Calcote	RJr
DE	94	Cameron Houston	Sr
DE	96	Kirsten Williams	RJr
DE		Tylo Phillips	Jr
DE		Chidera Umeh	Fr
DB	1	Stanley Norman	Sr
DB	4	Steven Jones	Jr
DB	6	Nakota Sheperd-Creer	Sr
DB	8	Keshawn Young	Sr
DB	9	Kryon Norwood	Sr
DB	12	Courtlon Allen	RJr
DB	13	Jason Thomas	RJr
DB	17	Anthony Ruffin	So
DB	20	Desmond Veals	Sr
DB	22	Andre Mulinax	Sr
DB	24	Tanner Douglas	Jr
DB	29	Chris Henry	RJr
DB	33	Casden Brooks	Jr
DB	37	Jalen Wells	Fr
DB	41	Michael Lawson	Sr
DB	46	Jayz'n Robinson	Fr
DB		Ko Clark	Fr
DB		Jacob Fex	Fr
CB/WR		Timothy Conerly	Fr

Special teams

Pos.	#	Name	Class
K/P	32	Enrique Carmona	So
K	31	Elvin Martinez	Sr
K	47	Bailey Giffen	Sr
DS	50	Luke Wallis	So
DS	59	John Farris	Fr

Head coach

Blane Morgan

Coordinators/assistant coaches

- Patrick Covington, Off Coord and OL
- Ron Antoine, Co-Off Coord and WRs
- Matt Weikert, Def Coord and interior LBs
- Coby Gipson, Recruiting coord and RBs
- Jackson Eskierka, QBs
- Austen Jacobs, TEs
- Scott Thiessen, Outside LBs
- Carson Earp, QC-Offense
- Jordan Hopkins, QC-Defense
- Daniel Darcy, Strength and Conditioning Coord

Legend

- (C) Team captain
- (S) Suspended
- (I) Ineligible
- Injured
- Redshirt

Roster
Last update: February 28, 2020
