= 2020 Abilene Christian Wildcats football team =

American college football season

2020 Abilene Christian Wildcats football
- Conference: Southland Conference
- Record: 1–5 (0–1 Southland)
- Head coach: Adam Dorrel (4th season)
- Offensive coordinator: Josh Lamberson (4th season)
- Offensive scheme: Single set back
- Defensive coordinator: Clint Brown (2nd season)
- Base defense: 4–3
- Home stadium: Anthony Field at Wildcat Stadium

2020 Southland Conference football standings
	Conf.			Overall
Team	W		L	W		L
No. 1 Sam Houston State $^	6	–	0	10	–	0
No. 20 Southeastern Louisiana	4	–	2	4	–	3
No. 23 Nicholls	3	–	3	4	–	3
Incarnate Word	3	–	3	3	–	3
Lamar	2	–	4	2	–	4
McNeese State*	2	–	4	3	–	4
Northwestern State	1	–	5	1	–	5
$ – Conference champion; ^ – FCS playoff participant; * – Ineligible for FCS postseason play due to NCAA sanctions Note: Abilene Christian, Central Arkansas, Houston Baptist, and Stephen F. Austin played only in the fall and opted out of the spring season.; Rankings from STATS Poll

2020 NCAA Division I FCS independents football standings
	Conf.			Overall
Team	W		L	W		L
Stephen F. Austin		–		6	–	4
Tarleton State†		–		5	–	3
Central Arkansas		–		5	–	4
Presbyterian†		–		4	–	3
Eastern Kentucky		–		3	–	6
Dixie State†		–		2	–	3
Houston Baptist		–		1	–	3
Abilene Christian		–		1	–	5
Campbell		–		0	–	4
North Alabama		–		0	–	4
Note: † – Dixie State, Presbyterian, and Tarleton State played only in the spring. All other teams listed played only in the fall. Presbyterian was in a scheduling agreement with the Pioneer Football League, which it fully joined in July 2021.

The 2020 Abilene Christian Wildcats football team represented Abilene Christian University in the 2020–21 NCAA Division I FCS football season as a member of the Southland Conference. The Wildcats were led by fourth-year head coach Adam Dorrel and played their home games at Anthony Field at Wildcat Stadium. The Wildcats finished the season with a 1–5 overall record.

== Preseason ==
=== Preseason poll ===
The Southland Conference released their original preseason poll in July 2020. The Wildcats were picked to finish seventh in the conference, prior to their schedule split from the rest of the league. In addition, four Wildcats were chosen to the Preseason All-Southland Team

Predicted finish	Team	Votes (1st place)
1	Central Arkansas*	190 (12)
2	Sam Houston State	170 (4)
3	Nicholls	169 (6)
4	Southeastern Louisiana	157
5	McNeese State	113
6	Incarnate Word	104
7	Abilene Christian*	101
8	Stephen F. Austin*	60
9	Houston Baptist*	59
10	Northwestern State	49
11	Lamar	38

(*) These teams opted out of playing in the revised spring 2021 Southland schedule, and instead played as Independent in the fall of 2020.

=== Preseason All–Southland Teams ===
Offense

1st Team

- Branden Hohenstein – Tight End/Halfback, SR

2nd Team

- Bill McCrary – Running Back, SR
- Kade Parmelly – Offensive Lineman, SR

Defense

1st Team

- Kameron Hill – Defensive Lineman, SR

== Schedule ==
Abilene Christian had a game scheduled against Texas A&M, which was canceled due to the COVID-19 pandemic.

Date	Time	Opponent	Site	TV	Result	Attendance
September 19	8:00 p.m.	at UTEP*	Sun Bowl; El Paso, TX	ESPN3	L 13–17	6,056
October 3	12:30 p.m.	at Army*	Michie Stadium; West Point, NY	CBSSN	L 23–55	5,306
~~October 17~~	~~6:00 p.m.~~	~~West Texas A&M~~*^{†}	~~Wildcat Stadium~~; ~~Abilene, TX~~	~~ESPN+~~	Canceled	
October 24	12:30 p.m.	vs. Stephen F. Austin	Globe Life Field; Arlington, TX	ESPN3	L 32–35 ^{OT}	5,211
October 31	2:00 p.m.	at Mercer*	Five Star Stadium; Macon, GA	ESPN3	W 20–17	2,372
November 7	3:00 p.m.	Angelo State*	Wildcat Stadium; Abilene, TX	ESPN+	L 21–34	4,787
~~November 14~~	~~3:00 p.m.~~	~~Arizona Christian~~*	~~Wildcat Stadium~~; ~~Abilene, TX~~	~~ESPN+~~	Canceled	
November 21	3:00 p.m.	at Virginia*	Scott Stadium; Charlottesville, VA	ESPN3	L 15–55	250
*Non-conference game; ^{†}Homecoming; Rankings from STATS Poll released prior to the game; All times are in Central time

== Game summaries ==
=== At UTEP ===
Abilene Christian at Texas–El Paso

Team	1	2	3	4	Total
Wildcats	7	0	3	3	13
• Miners	0	10	0	7	17

- Date: September 19, 2020
- Location: Sun Bowl
  El Paso, TX
- Game start: 7:05 p.m. MDT
- Elapsed time: 3 hours and 1 minute
- Game attendance: 6,056
- Game weather: Temperature: 81 °F (27 °C) • Weather: Sunny • Wind: NE 8 MPH
- Referee: Anthony Perez
- TV announcers (ESPN3): Erik Elken (play–by–play) and Trevor Vittatoe (analyst)

Scoring summary
1	09:03	ACU	Jermiah Dobbins 2–yard run (Blair Zepeda kick) (6 plays, 56 yards, 3:06)	ACU 7–0
2	08:31	UTEP	Gavin Baechle 27–yard field goal (10 plays, 58 yards, 4:21)	ACU 7–3
2	06:18	UTEP	Joshua Fields 5–yard run (Gavin Baechle kick) (2 plays, 56 yards, 0:48)	UTEP 10–7
3	06:58	ACU	Blair Zepeda 29–yard field goal (10 plays, 66 yards, 5:45)	TIE 10–10
4	14:12	UTEP	Ronald Awatt 4–yard run (Gavin Baechle kick) (13 plays, 75 yards, 7:46)	UTEP 17–10
4	05:19	ACU	Blair Zepeda 39–yard field goal (6 plays, 45 yards, 3:33)	UTEP 17–13

Statistics	Abilene Christian	UTEP
First downs	15	17
Total yards	308	293
Rushing yards	99	98
Passing yards	209	195
Turnovers	5	1
Time of possession	30:02	29:58

Team	Category	Player	Statistics
Abilene Christian	Passing	Peyton Mansell	14/21, 202 yards
Abilene Christian	Rushing	Tyrese White	11 carries, 41 yards
Abilene Christian	Receiving	Taelyn Williams	2 receptions, 77 yards
UTEP	Passing	Gavin Hardison	15/25, 195 yards
UTEP	Rushing	Joshua Fields	17 carries, 75 yards, 1 TD
UTEP	Receiving	Jacob Cowing	8 receptions, 110 yards

=== At Army ===
Abilene Christian Wildcats at Army Black Knights

Quarter	1	2	3	4	Total
Wildcats	0	3	7	13	23
Black Knights	7	16	15	17	55

at Michie Stadium, West Point, NY

- Date: October 3, 2020
- Game time: 1:30 p.m. EDT
- Game weather: Temperature: 62 °F (17 °C) • Wind: W 7 mph • Weather: Sunny
- Game attendance: 5,306
- Referee: Jerry McGinn
- TV announcers (CBSSN): Ben Holden (play-by-play), Ross Tucker (analyst) & Tina Cervasio (sideline)
- ESPN – Jones accounts for 3 TDs, Army beats Abilene Christian 55–23 /// Box Score, Abilene Christian at Army /// Pregame Notes /// Postgame Notes

Game information

First Quarter

- (08:20) ARMY TD – Sandon McCoy 1-yard rush, Landon Salyers kick
  Drive: 10 plays, 45 yards, 5:19; Army 7–0

Second Quarter

- (14:55) ARMY FG – Landon Salyers 43-yard field goal
  Drive: 6 plays, 39 yards, 3:37; Army 10–0
- (12:37) ARMY TD – Jemel Jones 3-yard rush, Landon Salyers kick failed
  Drive: 2 plays, 16 yards, 0:16; Army 16–0
- (10:15) ARMY TD – Jakobi Buchanan 3-yard rush, Landon Salyers kick
  Drive: 5 plays, 58 yards, 2:18; Army 23–0
- (07:59) ACU FG – Blair Zepeda 31-yard field goal
  Drive: 6 plays, 62 yards, 2:08; Army 23–3

Third Quarter

- (13:27) ARMY TD – Michael Roberts 33-yard pass from Jemel Jones, Artice Hobbs IV rush
  Drive: 3 plays, 75 yards, 1:33; Army 31–3
- (04:18) ACU TD – Kobe Clark 2-yard pass from Peyton Mansell, Blair Zepeda kick
  Drive: 9 plays, 61 yards, 4:04; Army 31–10
- (02:56) ARMY TD – Jemel Jones 49-yard rush, Landon Salyers kick
  Drive: 3 plays, 68 yards, 1:15; Army 38–10

Fourth Quarter

- (11:12) ARMY FG – Quinn Maretzki 40-yard field goal
  Drive: 11 plays, 55 yards, 4:25; Army 41–10
- (08:29) ACU TD – Kobe Clark 45-yard pass from Peyton Mansell, Blair Zepeda kick
  Drive: 5 plays, 80 yards, 2:35; Army 41–17
- (04:29) ARMY TD – Anthony Adkins 3-yard rush, Quinn Maretzki kick
  Drive: 8 plays, 76 yards, 3:58; Army 48–17
- (03:01) ACU TD – Branden Hohenstein 61-yard pass from Peyton Mansell, Blair Zepeda kick failed
  Drive: 3 plays, 74 yards, 1:23; Army 48–23
- (00:37) ARMY TD – Anthony Adkins 28-yard rush, Quinn Maretzki kick
  Drive: 5 plays, 46 yards, 2:24; Army 55–23

Passing

- ACU – Peyton Mansell: 23/37, 279 yards, 3 TD
- ARMY – Jemel Jones: 4/7, 52 yards, 1 TD

Rushing

- ACU – L.J. McConnell: 2 carries, 59 yards
- ARMY – Jemel Jones: 14 carries, 138 yards, 2 TD

Receiving

- ACU – L.J. McConnell: 11 receptions, 101 yards
- ARMY – Michael Roberts: 2 receptions, 38 yards, 1 TD

Defense

- ACU – Jordan Paup: 8 total tackles (3 solo, 5 assisted)
- ARMY – Marquel Broughton: 8 total tackles (7 solo, 1 assisted), 1 forced fumble

Statistics	ACU	ARMY
First downs	19	24
3rd down efficiency	1–10	3–11
4th down efficiency	1–3	2–3
Plays–yards	62–388	67–493
Rushes–yards	23–86	60–441
Passing yards	302	52
Passing: Comp–Att–Int	25–39–0	4–7–0
Penalties–yards	6–48	4–27
Turnovers	0	0
Time of possession	28:15	31:45

=== West Texas A&M ===
	1	2	3	4	Total
~~Buffaloes~~					0
~~Wildcats~~					0

=== Vs. Stephen F. Austin ===
	1	2	3	4	OT	Total
Wildcats	7	7	0	15	3	32
Lumberjacks	0	7	6	16	6	35

=== At Mercer ===
	1	2	3	4	Total
Wildcats	7	0	3	10	20
Bears	0	10	7	0	17

=== Angelo State ===
	1	2	3	4	Total
Rams	14	14	0	6	34
Wildcats	0	7	14	0	21

=== Arizona Christian ===
	1	2	3	4	Total
~~Firestorm~~					0
~~Wildcats~~					0

=== At Virginia ===
	1	2	3	4	Total
Wildcats	0	7	0	8	15
Cavaliers	14	14	14	13	55
