= 2020 Dixie State Trailblazers football team =

American college football season

2020 Dixie State Trailblazers football
- Conference: Independent
- Record: 2–3
- Head coach: Paul Peterson (2nd season)
- Offensive coordinator: Kelly Bills (1st season)
- Defensive coordinator: Tyler Almond (2nd season)
- Home stadium: Greater Zion Stadium

2020 NCAA Division I FCS independents football standings
	Conf.			Overall
Team	W		L	W		L
Stephen F. Austin		–		6	–	4
Tarleton State†		–		5	–	3
Central Arkansas		–		5	–	4
Presbyterian†		–		4	–	3
Eastern Kentucky		–		3	–	6
Dixie State†		–		2	–	3
Houston Baptist		–		1	–	3
Abilene Christian		–		1	–	5
Campbell		–		0	–	4
North Alabama		–		0	–	4
Note: † – Dixie State, Presbyterian, and Tarleton State played only in the spring. All other teams listed played only in the fall. Presbyterian was in a scheduling agreement with the Pioneer Football League, which it fully joined in July 2021.

The 2020 Dixie State Trailblazers football team represented Dixie State University (now Utah Tech University) in the 2020–21 NCAA Division I FCS football season as an independent. They were led by second-year head coach Paul Peterson and played their home games at Greater Zion Stadium in St. George, Utah. Due to the NCAA's transition rules, they were not eligible for the 2020 FCS Playoffs.

== Schedule ==
Dixie State had a game scheduled against Drake, which was canceled due to the COVID-19 pandemic.

Date	Time	Opponent	Site	TV	Result	Attendance
February 27, 2021	1:00 p.m.	at No. 22 Tarleton State	Memorial Stadium; Stephenville, TX	ESPN+	W 26–14	1,121
March 7, 2021	3:00 p.m.	at New Mexico State	Sun Bowl; El Paso, TX	FSAZ+/FloSports/Comcast	L 29–36	0
March 13, 2021	7:00 p.m.	Tarleton State	Greater Zion Stadium; St. George, UT	YouTube	L 15–37	1,427
March 20, 2021	11:00 a.m.	at No. 9 Kennesaw State	Fifth Third Bank Stadium; Kennesaw, GA	ESPN+	L 27–37	2,156
March 27, 2021	7:00 p.m.	Fort Lewis	Greater Zion Stadium; St. George, UT	YouTube	W 60–0	2,174
~~April 3, 2021~~	~~7:00 p.m.~~	~~New Mexico Highlands~~	~~Greater Zion Stadium~~; ~~St. George, UT~~		No contest	
Rankings from STATS Poll released prior to the game; All times are in Mountain time
