= 2020 Houston Baptist Huskies football team =

American college football season

2020 Houston Baptist Huskies football
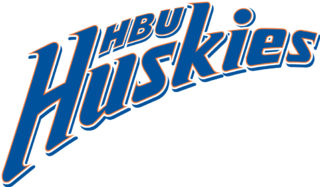
- Conference: Independent
- Record: 1–3
- Head coach: Vic Shealy (8th season)
- Offensive coordinator: Zach Kittley (3rd season)
- Offensive scheme: Air raid
- Co-defensive coordinators: Roger Hinshaw (8th season); Jeff Mills (3rd season)
- Base defense: 3–4 or 4–3
- Home stadium: Husky Stadium

2020 Southland Conference football standings
	Conf.			Overall
Team	W		L	W		L
No. 1 Sam Houston State $^	6	–	0	10	–	0
No. 20 Southeastern Louisiana	4	–	2	4	–	3
No. 23 Nicholls	3	–	3	4	–	3
Incarnate Word	3	–	3	3	–	3
Lamar	2	–	4	2	–	4
McNeese State*	2	–	4	3	–	4
Northwestern State	1	–	5	1	–	5
$ – Conference champion; ^ – FCS playoff participant; * – Ineligible for FCS postseason play due to NCAA sanctions Note: Abilene Christian, Central Arkansas, Houston Baptist, and Stephen F. Austin played only in the fall and opted out of the spring season.; Rankings from STATS Poll

2020 NCAA Division I FCS independents football standings
	Conf.			Overall
Team	W		L	W		L
Stephen F. Austin		–		6	–	4
Tarleton State†		–		5	–	3
Central Arkansas		–		5	–	4
Presbyterian†		–		4	–	3
Eastern Kentucky		–		3	–	6
Dixie State†		–		2	–	3
Houston Baptist		–		1	–	3
Abilene Christian		–		1	–	5
Campbell		–		0	–	4
North Alabama		–		0	–	4
Note: † – Dixie State, Presbyterian, and Tarleton State played only in the spring. All other teams listed played only in the fall. Presbyterian was in a scheduling agreement with the Pioneer Football League, which it fully joined in July 2021.

The 2020 Houston Baptist Huskies football team represented Houston Baptist University in the 2020–21 NCAA Division I FCS football season. The Huskies played four non-conference games in the fall of 2020 and opted out of the Southland Conference season played in the spring of 2021 and instead competed as an FCS independent. Led by eighth-year head coach Vic Shealy, Houston Baptist compiled a record of 1–3. The team played home games at Husky Stadium in Houston.

== Preseason ==
=== Preseason poll ===
The Southland Conference released their original preseason poll in July 2020. The Huskies were picked to finish ninth in the conference, prior to their schedule split from the rest of the league. In addition, five Huskies were chosen to the Preseason All-Southland Team

Predicted finish	Team	Votes (1st place)
1	Central Arkansas*	190 (12)
2	Sam Houston State	170 (4)
3	Nicholls	169 (6)
4	Southeastern Louisiana	157
5	McNeese State	113
6	Incarnate Word	104
7	Abilene Christian*	101
8	Stephen F. Austin*	60
9	Houston Baptist*	59
10	Northwestern State	49
11	Lamar	38

(*) These teams opted out of playing in the revised spring 2021 Southland schedule, and instead played as Independent in the fall of 2020.

=== Preseason All–Southland Teams ===
Offense

2nd Team

- Dreshawn Minnieweather – Running Back, SR
- Ben Ratzlaff – Wide Receiver, SR
- Jerreth Sterns – Wide Receiver, JR
- Blake Patterson – Punter, SR

Defense

2nd Team

- Caleb Johnson – Linebacker, SR

== Schedule ==
Houston Baptist had a game scheduled against Texas Southern, but was canceled due to the COVID-19 pandemic. On July 22, Houston Baptist announced that it had added a game against Louisiana Tech as a replacement for Texas Southern.

Date	Time	Opponent	Site	TV	Result	Attendance
September 5	6:30 p.m.	at North Texas	Apogee Stadium; Denton, TX	ESPN3	L 31–57	7,611
September 12	7:00 p.m.	at Texas Tech	Jones AT&T Stadium; Lubbock, TX	ESPN+	L 33–35	11,157
September 26	6:00 p.m.	at Louisiana Tech	Joe Aillet Stadium; Ruston, LA	ESPN3	L 38–66	7,140
October 3	2:00 p.m.	at Eastern Kentucky	Roy Kidd Stadium; Richmond, KY	ESPN+	W 33–30	2,916
Rankings from STATS Poll released prior to the game; All times are in Central time

== Game summaries ==
=== At North Texas ===
Houston Baptist Huskies at North Texas Mean Green

Quarter	1	2	3	4	Total
Huskies	0	10	7	14	31
Mean Green	14	9	20	14	57

at Apogee Stadium, Denton, Texas

- Date: September 5
- Game time: 6:30 p.m. CDT
- Game weather: Cloudy, 77 °F (25 °C)
- Game attendance: 7,611
- Referee: Billy Williams
- TV announcers (ESPN3): Doug Anderson and LaDarrin McLane
- Box score, Recap

Game information
First quarter
- UNT – Jaelon Darden 33-yard pass from Jason Bean (Zach Williams kick), 12:31. Mean Green 7–0. Drive: 10 plays, 75 yards, 2:29.
- UNT – Greg White 32-yard pass from Jason Bean (Zach Williams kick), 6:07. Mean Green 14–0. Drive: 8 plays, 95 yards, 2:16.

Second quarter

- UNT – Jaelon Darden 19-yard pass from Jason Bean (kick failed), 14:35. Mean Green 20–0. Drive: 8 plays, 74 yards, 2:08.
- HBU – Josh Alfaro 7-yard pass from Bailey Zappe (Gino Garcia kick), 9:39. Mean Green 20–7. Drive: 5 plays, 29 yards, 1:56.
- UNT – Zach Williams 30-yard field goal, 1:18. Mean Green 23–7. Drive: 9 plays, 67 yards, 3:07.
- HBU – Gino Garcia 50-yard field goal, 0:00. Mean Green 23–10. Drive: 5 plays, 42 yards, 1:18.

Third quarter

- UNT – Jason Bean 37-yard run (pass failed), 8:23. Mean Green 29–10. Drive: 7 plays, 67 yards, 2:18.
- UNT – Oscar Adaway III 35-yard run (Zach Williams kick), 7:08. Mean Green 36–10. Drive: 3 plays, 79 yards, 0:38.
- UNT – Jaelon Darden 6-yard pass from Austin Aune (Zach Williams kick), 3:37. Mean Green 43–10. Drive: 8 plays, 70 yards, 2:19.
- HBU – Blaise Bentsen 1-yard run (Gino Garcia kick), 0:30. Mean Grean 43–17. Drive: 10 plays, 75 yards, 3:07.

Fourth quarter

- UNT – Oscar Adaway III 47-yard run (Zach Williams kick), 14:25. Mean Green 50–17. Drive: 4 plays, 75 yards, 1:05.
- UNT – Isaiah Johnson 16-yard run (Zach Williams kick), 11:19. Mean Green 57–17. Drive: 7 plays, 55 yards, 1:56.
- HBU – Ben Ratzlaff 71-yard pass from Bailey Zappe (Gino Garcia kick), 9:36. Mean Green 57–24. Drive: 6 plays, 97 yards, 1:43.
- HBU – Josh Sterns 38-yard pass from Bailey Zappe (Gino Garcia kick), 5:36. Mean Green 57–31. Drive: 6 plays, 77 yards, 1:59.

Statistics	HBU	UNT
First downs	28	33
Total yards	569	721
Rushing yards	89	360
Passing yards	480	361
Turnovers	0	1
Time of possession	31:41	28:19

Team	Category	Player	Statistics
Houston Baptist	Passing	Bailey Zappe	39/62, 480 yards, 3 TD
Houston Baptist	Rushing	Ean Beek	12 rushes, 48 yards
Houston Baptist	Receiving	Ben Ratzlaff	6 receptions, 108 yards, TD
North Texas	Passing	Jason Bean	11/18, 217 yards, 3 TD, INT
North Texas	Rushing	Oscar Adaway III	5 rushes, 118 yards, 2 TD
North Texas	Receiving	Greg White	2 receptions, 76 yards, TD

=== At Texas Tech ===
Houston Baptist Huskies at Texas Tech Red Raiders

Quarter	1	2	3	4	Total
Huskies	3	7	10	13	33
Red Raiders	14	7	7	7	35

at Jones AT&T Stadium, Lubbock, Texas

- Date: September 12
- Game time: 7:00 p.m. CDT
- Game attendance: 11,157
- Referee: Brad Van Vark
- TV announcers (ESPN+): Anish Shroff, Tom Luginbill, and Ian Fitzsimmons
- Box score, Recap

Game information

First quarter

- TTU – Erik Ezukanma 7-yard pass from Alan Bowman (Trey Wolff kick), 13:22. Red Raiders 7–0. Drive: 5 plays, 75 yards, 1:38.
- HBU – Gino Garcia 40-yard field goal, 10:11. Red Raiders 7–3. Drive: 9 plays, 53 yards, 3:11.
- TTU – SaRodorick Thompson 5-yard run (Trey Wolff kick), 3:39. Red Raiders 14–3. Drive: 11 plays, 95 yards, 4:18.

Second quarter

- TTU – Tahj Brooks 1-yard run (Trey Wolff kick), 6:22. Red Raiders 21–3. Drive: 8 plays, 42 yards, 2:32.
- HBU – D. J. Dormeus 65-yard pass from Bailey Zappe (Gino Garcia kick), 5:21. Red Raiders 21–10. Drive: 4 plays, 81 yards, 1:01.

Third quarter

- HBU – Gino Garcia 44-yard field goal, 8:25. Red Raiders 21–13. Drive: 6 plays, 17 yards, 1:42.
- HBU – Josh Sterns 65-yard pass from Bailey Zappe (Gino Garcia kick), 5:40. Red Raiders 21–20. Drive: 3 plays, 80 yards, 0:59.
- TTU – SaRodorick Thompson 8-yard run (Trey Wolff kick), 1:39. Red Raiders 28–20. Drive: 11 plays, 75 yards, 4:01.

Fourth quarter

- TTU – KeSean Carter 18-yard pass from Alan Bowman (Trey Wolff kick), 11:29. Red Raiders 35–20. Drive: 11 plays, 84 yards, 2:41.
- HBU – Josh Sterns 75-yard pass from Bailey Zappe (Gino Garcia kick), 11:19. Red Raiders 35–27. Drive: 1 play, 75 yards, 0:10.
- HBU – Jerreth Sterns 6-yard pass from Bailey Zappe (pass failed), 3:23. Red Raiders 35–33. Drive: 7 plays, 96 yards, 2:02.

Statistics	HBU	TTU
First downs	28	35
Total yards	600	624
Rushing yards	28	194
Passing yards	572	430
Turnovers	1	1
Time of possession	26:56	33:04

Team	Category	Player	Statistics
Houston Baptist	Passing	Bailey Zappe	30/49, 567 yards, 4 TD
Houston Baptist	Rushing	Ean Beek	16 rushes, 34 yards
Houston Baptist	Receiving	Josh Sterns	5 receptions, 209 yards, 2 TD
Texas Tech	Passing	Alan Bowman	38/52, 430 yards, 2 TD, INT
Texas Tech	Rushing	SaRodorick Thompson	22 rushes, 118 yards, 2 TD
Texas Tech	Receiving	KeSean Carter	6 receptions, 86 yards, TD

=== At Louisiana Tech ===
Houston Baptist Huskies at Louisiana Tech Bulldogs

Quarter	1	2	3	4	Total
Huskies	14	3	7	14	38
Bulldogs	17	21	14	14	66

at Joe Aillet Stadium, Ruston, Louisiana

- Date: September 26
- Game time: 6:00 p.m. CDT
- Game weather: Sunny • Temperature: 82 °F (28 °C) • Wind: 0 MPH
- Game attendance: 11,157
- Referee: Ken Antee
- TV announcers (ESPN3): Lyn Rollins (play-by-play) and Chris Mycoskie (analyst)
- Box score, Recap

Game information

First quarter

- LT – Jacob Barnes 51-yard field goal, 11:59. Bulldogs 3–0. Drive: 4 plays, 0 yards, 0:23.
- HBU – Jerreth Sterns 4-yard pass from Bailey Zappe (Gino Garcia kick), 8:29. Huskies 7–3. Drive: 10 plays, 75 yards, 3:30.
- LT – Wayne Toussant 44-yard pass from Luke Anthony (Jacob Barnes kick), 7:24. Bulldogs 10–7. Drive: 3 plays, 75 yards, 1:05.
- HBU – Ben Ratzlaff 6-yard pass from Bailey Zappe (Gino Garcia kick), 3:42. Huskies 14–10. Drive: 12 plays, 82 yards, 3:42.
- LT – Wayne Toussant 43-yard pass from Luke Anthony (Jacob Barnes kick), 0:49. Bulldogs 17–14. Drive: 8 plays, 75 yards, 2:53.

Second quarter

- LT – Isaiah Graham 14-yard pass from Luke Anthony (Jacob Barnes kick), 13:34. Bulldogs 24–14. Drive: 4 plays, 72 yards, 1:08.
- LT – Justin Henderson 3-yard rush (Jacob Barnes kick), 12:01. Bulldogs 31–14. Drive: 1 play, 3 yards, 0:05.
- LT – Isaiah Graham 15-yard pass from Luke Anthony (Jacob Barnes kick), 3:24. Bulldogs 38–14. Drive: 10 plays, 81 yards, 4:56.
- HBU – Gino Garcia 42-yard field goal, 0:15. Bulldogs 38–17. Drive: 11 plays, 50 yards, 3:09.

Third quarter

- HBU – Jerreth Sterns 2-yard pass from Bailey Zappe (Gino Garica kick), 9:48. Bulldogs 38–24. Drive: 6 plays, 55 yards, 1:56.
- LT – Jawaun Johnson 41-yard pass from Luke Anthony (Jacob Barnes kick), 7:50. Bulldogs 45–24. Drive: 4 plays, 70 yards, 1:58.
- LT – Luke Anthony 1-yard rush (Jacob Barnes kick), 2:39. Bulldogs 52–24. Drive: 8 plays, 77 yards, 3:44.

Fourth quarter

- HBU – Ben Ratzlaff 1-yard pass from Bailey Zappe (Gino Garcia kick), 13:25. Bulldogs 52–31. Drive: 14 plays, 75 yards, 4:14.
- LT – Greg Garner 2-yard rush (Jacob Barnes kick), 8:52. Bulldogs 59–31. Drive: 10 plays, 60 yards, 4:33.
- HBU – Jerreth Sterns 1-yard pass from Bailey Zappe (Gino Garica kick), 5:42. Bulldogs 59–38. Drive: 10 plays, 85 yards, 3:10.
- LT – Kyle Maxwell 7-yard pass from Westin Elliott (Jacob Barnes kick), 1:15. Bulldogs 66–38. Drive: 8 plays, 62 yards, 4:27.

Statistics	HBU	LT
First downs	26	32
Total yards	501	542
Rushing yards	95	182
Passing yards	406	360
Turnovers	2	1
Time of possession	29:37	30:23

Team	Category	Player	Statistics
Houston Baptist	Passing	Bailey Zappe	37/58, 406 yards, 5 TD, INT
Houston Baptist	Rushing	Ean Beek	6 rushes, 35 yards
Houston Baptist	Receiving	Jerreth Sterns	14 receptions, 138 yards, 3 TD
Louisiana Tech	Passing	Luke Anthony	17/30, 314 yards, 5 TD, INT
Louisiana Tech	Rushing	Justin Henderson	11 rushes, 77 yards, TD
Louisiana Tech	Receiving	Wayne Toussant	3 receptions, 91 yards, 2 TD

=== At Eastern Kentucky ===
Houston Baptist Huskies at Eastern Kentucky Colonels

Quarter	1	2	3	4	Total
Huskies	14	10	7	2	33
Colonels	7	0	10	13	30

at Roy Kidd Stadium, Richmond, Kentucky

- Date: October 3
- Game time: 2:00 p.m. CDT
- Game weather: Cloudy 43% Humidity • Temperature: 62–69 °F (17–21 °C) • Wind: 1-3 SW MPH
- Game attendance: 2,916
- Referee: Steve Hazle
- TV: ESPN3
- Box score, Recap

Game information

First quarter

- HBU – Vernon Harrell 8-yard pass from Bailey Zappe (Gino Garcia kick), 7:45. Huskies 7–0. Drive: 6 plays, 49 yards, 1:12.
- HBU – Jerreth Sterns 42-yard pass from Bailey Zappe (Gino Garcia kick), 6:01. Huskies 14–0. Drive: 2 plays, 57 yards, 0:21.

EKU – Matt Wilcox Jr. 10-yard pass from Parker McKinney (Alexander Woznick kick), 1:32. Huskies 14–7. Drive: 11 plays, 75 yards, 4:29.

Second quarter

- HBU – Gino Garcia 24-yard field goal, 14:01. Huskies 17–7. Drive: 9 plays, 68 yards, 2:31.
- HBU – Dreshawn Minnieweather 1-yard run (Gino Garcia kick), 0:43. Huskies 24–7. Drive: 7 plays, 43 yards, 2:49.

Third quarter

- EKU – Matt Wilcox Jr. 7-yard pass from Parker McKinney (Alexander Woznick kick), 10:53. Huskies 24–14. Drive: 10 plays, 75 yards, 4:07.
- EKU – Alexander Woznick 26-yard field goal, 1:36. Huskies 24–17. Drive: 10 plays, 55 yards, 4:25.
- HBU – Josh Sterns 65-yard pass from Bailey Zappe (Gino Garcia kick), 0:38. Huskies 31–17. Drive: 3 plays, 70 yards, 0:58.

Fourth quarter

- EKU – Alonzo Booth 29-yard run (A. Woznick kick), 13:21. Huskies 31–24. Drive: 8 plays, 75 yards, 2:17.
- EKU – Keyion Dixon 27-yard pass from Parker McKinney (Alexander Woznick kick blocked), 4:04. Huskies 31–30. Drive: 12 plays, 80 yards, 6:22.
- HBU – Tra Fluellen 98-yard PAT return, 4:04. Huskies 33–30

Statistics	HBU	EKU
First downs	24	26
Total yards	520	480
Rushing yards	140	184
Passing yards	380	296
Turnovers	0	3
Time of possession	27:41	32:19

Team	Category	Player	Statistics
Houston Baptist	Passing	Bailey Zappe	35/46, 380 yards, 3 TD
Houston Baptist	Rushing	Dreshawn Minnieweather	9 rushes, 38 yards, TD
Houston Baptist	Receiving	Vernon Harrell	10 receptions, 98 yards, TD
Eastern Kentucky	Passing	Parker McKinney	25/40, 296 yards, 3 TD, 2 INT
Eastern Kentucky	Rushing	Alonzo Booth	17 rushes, 108 yards, TD
Eastern Kentucky	Receiving	Keyion Dixon	6 receptions, 112 yards, TD
