= 2020 Tarleton State Texans football team =

American college football season

2020 Tarleton State Texans football
- Conference: Independent
- Record: 5–3
- Head coach: Todd Whitten (11th season)
- Co-offensive coordinators: Jonathan Beasley (4th season); Scott Carey (3rd season)
- Offensive scheme: Spread
- Defensive coordinator: Marcus Patton (5th season)
- Base defense: 4–3
- Home stadium: Memorial Stadium

2020 NCAA Division I FCS independents football standings
	Conf.			Overall
Team	W		L	W		L
Stephen F. Austin		–		6	–	4
Tarleton State†		–		5	–	3
Central Arkansas		–		5	–	4
Presbyterian†		–		4	–	3
Eastern Kentucky		–		3	–	6
Dixie State†		–		2	–	3
Houston Baptist		–		1	–	3
Abilene Christian		–		1	–	5
Campbell		–		0	–	4
North Alabama		–		0	–	4
Note: † – Dixie State, Presbyterian, and Tarleton State played only in the spring. All other teams listed played only in the fall. Presbyterian was in a scheduling agreement with the Pioneer Football League, which it fully joined in July 2021.

The 2020 Tarleton State Texans football team represented Tarleton State University as an independent the 2020–21 NCAA Division I FCS football season. The team had planned to play in the fall 2020, until the postponement of the season on August 10, 2020, because of the COVID-19 pandemic. A schedule for the spring of 2021 was later arranged. Led by 11th-year head coach Todd Whitten, the Texas compiled a record of 5–3. Tarleton State played their home games at Memorial Stadium in Stephenville, Texas.

== Schedule ==
The team's 2020 fall schedule was scheduled with six home and six away games. On August 10, 2020, Tarleton State University announced the postponement of the football season, due to the COVID-19 pandemic, until the spring of 2021.

Date	Time	Opponent	Rank	Site	TV	Result	Attendance
February 13, 2021	6:00 p.m.	McNeese State		Memorial Stadium; Stephenville, TX	FSSW+/FS Go	L 37–40 ^{2OT}	1,324
February 21, 2021	4:00 p.m.	at New Mexico State		Sun Bowl; El Paso, TX	FSAZ/FloSports/Comcast	W 43–17	0
February 27, 2021	2:00 p.m.	Dixie State	No. 22	Memorial Stadium; Stephenville, TX	ESPN+	L 14–26	1,121
March 6, 2021	2:00 p.m.	Mississippi College		Memorial Stadium; Stephenville, TX		W 39–14	3,614
March 13, 2021	8:00 p.m.	at Dixie State		Greater Zion Stadium; St. George, UT		W 37–15	1,427
March 20, 2021	6:00 p.m.	Midwestern State^{†}		Memorial Stadium; Stephenville, TX		W 33–21	10,776
March 27, 2021	6:00 p.m.	Northeastern State		Memorial Stadium; Stephenville, TX		W 38–0	4,912
April 1, 2021	6:00 p.m.	East Central		Memorial Stadium; Stephenville, TX		L 14–21	2,132
^{†}Homecoming; Rankings from STATS Poll released prior to the game; All times are in Central time

== Rankings ==
Ranking movements Legend: ██ Increase in ranking ██ Decrease in ranking — = Not ranked RV = Received votes
	Week										
Poll	Pre	1	2	3	4	5	6	7	8	9	Final
STATS	—	22	RV	RV	RV	RV	RV	RV	RV	—	—
Coaches'	Not released				RV	24	21	RV	RV	—	—

== Game summaries ==
=== McNeese State ===
McNeese State Cowboys at Tarleton State Texans – Game summary

Quarter	1	2	3	4	OT	2OT	Total
Cowboys	10	0	0	21	3	6	40
Texans	3	7	14	7	3	3	37

at Memorial Stadium, Stephenville, Texas

- Date: February 13, 2021
- Game time: 6:00 p.m. CST
- Game weather: Cloudy, 28 °F (−2 °C)
- Game attendance: 1,324
- Referee: Vidal Jones
- TV: FSSW+/FS Go
- Box score, Recap

Game information
First quarter
- MCN – Jacob Abel 21-yard field goal, 9:15. Cowboys 3–0. Drive: 12 plays, 61 yards, 4:31.
- MCN – Joshua Matthews 13-yard pass from Cody Oregeron (Jacob Abel kick), 5:26. Cowboys 10–0. Drive: 3 plays, 15 yards, 0:44.
- TAR – Adrian Guzman 38-yard field goal, 3:37. Cowboys 10–3. Drive: 6 plays, 33 yards, 1:41.

Second quarter

- TAR – Ryheem Skinner 4-yard run (Christian Hernandez kick), 1:05. Tied 10–10. Drive: 15 plays, 73 yards, 4:25.

Third quarter

- TAR – Tariq Bitson 13-yard pass from Steven Duncan (Christian Hernandez kick), 11:07. Texans 17–10. Drive: 6 plays, 60 yards, 1:34.
- TAR – Braelon Bridges 27-yard run (Christian Hernandez kick), 2:31. Texans 24–10. Drive: 10 plays, 77 yards, 3:31.

Fourth quarter

- MCN – Cody Oregeron 5-yard run (Jacob Abel kick), 12:09. Texans 24–17. Drive: 16 plays, 77 yards, 5:17.
- TAR – Braelon Bridges 1-yard run (Christian Hernandez kick), 7:39. Texans 31–17. Drive: 13 plays, 83 yards, 4:24.
- MCN – Mason Pierce 26-yard pass from Cody Orgeron (Jacob Abel kick), 2:46. Texans 31–24. Drive: 5 plays, 65 yards, 1:22.
- MCN – Trevor Begue 12-yard pass from Cody Oregeron (Jacob Abel kick), 0:35. Tied 31–31. Drive: 7 plays, 56 yards, 2:10.

Overtime

- MCN – Jacob Abel 21-yard field goal. Cowboys 34–31. Drive: 6 plays, 22 yards.
- TAR – Adrian Guzman 37-yard field goal. Tied 34–34. Drive: 4 plays, 5 yards.

Second overtime

- TAR – Adrian Guzman 45-yard field goal. Texans 37–34. Drive: 4 plays, -3 yards.
- MCN – Cody Oregeron 19-yard run. Cowboys 40–37. Drive: 2 plays, 25 yards.

Statistics	MCN	TAR
First downs	27	25
Total yards	400	408
Rushing yards	230	180
Passing yards	170	228
Turnovers	0	2
Time of possession	33:32	26:28

Team	Category	Player	Statistics
McNeese State	Passing	Cody Oregeron	14/34, 170 yards, 3 TD
McNeese State	Rushing	Cody Oregeron	19 rushes, 108 yards, 2 TD
McNeese State	Receiving	Deonta McMahon	2 receptions, 35 yards
Tarleton State	Passing	Steven Duncan	22/39, 217 yards, TD
Tarleton State	Rushing	Braelon Bridges	15 rushes, 112 yards, 2 TD
Tarleton State	Receiving	Tariq Bitson	5 receptions, 87 yards, TD

=== At New Mexico State ===
Tarleton State Texans at New Mexico State Aggies – Game summary

Quarter	1	2	3	4	Total
Texans	23	10	7	3	43
Aggies	7	0	3	7	17

at Sun Bowl, El Paso, Texas

- Date: February 21, 2021
- Game time: 4:00 p.m. CST/3:00 p.m. MST
- Game weather: Sunny, 58 °F (14 °C)
- Game attendance: 0
- Referee: Christian Watson
- TV announcers (FSAZ/FloSports/Comcast): Adam Young and Danny Knee
- Box score, Recap

Game information
First quarter
- TSU – Cameron Burston 70-yard run (Christian Hernandez kick), 14:36. Texans 7–0. Drive: 1 play, 75 yards, 0:24.
- TSU – Gabe Douglas 86-yard pass from Cameron Burston (Christian Hernandez kick), 11:31. Texans 14–0. Drive: 1 play, 86 yards, 0:12.
- NMSU – Juwaun Price 94-yard kickoff return (Ethan Albertson kick), 11:19. Texans 14–7.
- TSU – Team safety, 6:42. Texans 16–7.
- TSU – Cameron Burston 21-yard run (Christian Hernandez kick), 3:29. Texans 23–7. Drive: 6 plays, 51 yards, 3:07.

Second quarter

- TSU – Gabe Douglas 29-yard pass from Cameron Burston (Christian Hernandez kick), 7:16. Texans 30–7. Drive: 4 plays, 55 yards, 1:12.
- TSU – Adrian Guzman 35-yard field goal, 0:00. Texans 33–7. Drive: 9 plays, 52 yards, 2:42.

Third quarter

- TSU – DeAngelo Rosemond 4-yard run (Christian Hernandez kick), 14:11. Texans 40–7. Drive: 2 plays, 5 yards, 0:28.
- NMSU – Ethan Albertson 27-yard field goal, 1:56. Texans 40–10. Drive: 6 plays, 67 yards, 2:19.

Fourth quarter

- TSU – Adrian Guzman 34-yard field goal, 13:38. Texans 43–10. Drive: 7 plays, 57 yards, 3:18.
- NMSU – Robert Downs III 27-yard pass from Jonah Johnson (Ethan Albertson kick), 3:28. Texans 43–17. Drive: 4 plays, 65 yards, 1:01.

Statistics	TAR	NMSU
First downs	24	14
Total yards	501	241
Rushing yards	249	54
Passing yards	252	187
Turnovers	0	3
Time of possession	35:40	24:20

Team	Category	Player	Statistics
Tarleton State	Passing	Cameron Burston	15/29, 252 yards, 2 TD
Tarleton State	Rushing	Cameron Burston	4 rushes, 79 yards, 2 TD
Tarleton State	Receiving	Gabe Douglas	7 receptions, 190 yards, TD
New Mexico State	Passing	Jonah Johnson	17/31, 187 yards, TD, 3 INT
New Mexico State	Rushing	Juwaun Price	14 rushes, 31 yards
New Mexico State	Receiving	Terrell Warner	5 receptions, 77 yards

Due to COVID-19 restrictions imposed by the state of New Mexico, this game was played at the Sun Bowl in El Paso, Texas. Due to contact tracing, the Texans were missing five players, including starting quarterback Steven Duncan. The Aggies, an FBS team, paid the Texans $150,000 for the guarantee game.

=== Dixie State ===
Dixie State Trailblazers at No. 22 Tarleton State Texans – Game summary

Quarter	1	2	3	4	Total
Trailblazers	7	10	6	3	26
No. 22 Texans	0	7	7	0	14

at Memorial Stadium, Stephenville, Texas

- Date: February 27, 2021
- Game time: 2:00 p.m. CST
- Game weather: Foggy, 58 °F (14 °C)
- Game attendance: 1,121
- Referee: Dan Lewis
- TV: ESPN+
- Box score, Recap

Statistics	DXST	TAR
First downs		
Total yards		
Rushing yards		
Passing yards		
Turnovers		
Time of possession		

Team	Category	Player	Statistics
Dixie State	Passing		
Dixie State	Rushing		
Dixie State	Receiving		
Tarleton State	Passing		
Tarleton State	Rushing		
Tarleton State	Receiving		

=== Mississippi College ===
Mississippi College Choctaws at Tarleton State Texans – Game summary

Quarter	1	2	3	4	Total
Choctaws	0	6	8	0	14
Texans	21	8	0	10	39

at Memorial Stadium, Stephenville, Texas

- Date: March 13, 2021
- Game time: 8:00 p.m. CST
- Game weather: Sunny, 68 °F (20 °C)
- Game attendance: 3,614
- Referee: Vidal Jones
- Box score, Recap

Statistics	MIS	TAR
First downs		
Total yards		
Rushing yards		
Passing yards		
Turnovers		
Time of possession		

Team	Category	Player	Statistics
Mississippi College	Passing		
Mississippi College	Rushing		
Mississippi College	Receiving		
Tarleton State	Passing		
Tarleton State	Rushing		
Tarleton State	Receiving		

=== At Dixie State ===
Tarleton State Texans at Dixie State Trailblazers – Game summary

Quarter	1	2	3	4	Total
Texans	14	3	10	10	37
Trailblazers	0	0	3	12	15

at Greater Zion Stadium, St. George, Utah

- Date: March 13, 2021
- Game time: 8:00 p.m. CST/7:00 p.m. MST
- Game weather: Mostly cloudy, 48 °F (9 °C)
- Game attendance: 1,427
- Referee: Bret MacRae
- Box score, Recap

Statistics	TAR	DXST
First downs		
Total yards		
Rushing yards		
Passing yards		
Turnovers		
Time of possession		

Team	Category	Player	Statistics
Tarleton State	Passing		
Tarleton State	Rushing		
Tarleton State	Receiving		
Dixie State	Passing		
Dixie State	Rushing		
Dixie State	Receiving		

=== Midwestern State ===
Midwestern State Mustangs at Tarleton State Texans – Game summary

Quarter	1	2	3	4	Total
Mustangs	7	7	7	0	21
Texans	20	7	0	6	33

at Memorial Stadium, Stephenville, Texas

- Date: March 20, 2021
- Game time: 6:00 p.m. CST
- Game weather: Sunny, 68 °F (20 °C)
- Game attendance: 10,776
- Referee: Dan Jones
- Box score, Recap

Statistics	MID	TAR
First downs		
Total yards		
Rushing yards		
Passing yards		
Turnovers		
Time of possession		

Team	Category	Player	Statistics
Midwestern State	Passing		
Midwestern State	Rushing		
Midwestern State	Receiving		
Tarleton State	Passing		
Tarleton State	Rushing		
Tarleton State	Receiving		

=== Northeastern State ===
Northeastern State RiverHawks at Tarleton State Texans – Game summary

Quarter	1	2	3	4	Total
RiverHawks	0	0	0	0	0
Texans	14	3	7	14	38

at Memorial Stadium, Stephenville, Texas

- Date: March 27, 2021
- Game time: 6:00 p.m. CST
- Game weather: Clear, 78 °F (26 °C)
- Game attendance: 4,912
- Referee: Scott Hardin
- Box score, Recap

Statistics	NOR	TAR
First downs		
Total yards		
Rushing yards		
Passing yards		
Turnovers		
Time of possession		

Team	Category	Player	Statistics
Northeastern State	Passing		
Northeastern State	Rushing		
Northeastern State	Receiving		
Tarleton State	Passing		
Tarleton State	Rushing		
Tarleton State	Receiving		

=== East Central ===
East Central Tigers at Tarleton State Texans – Game summary

Quarter	1	2	3	4	Total
Tigers	7	0	14	0	21
Texans	7	0	7	0	14

at Memorial Stadium, Stephenville, Texas

- Date: April 1, 2021
- Game time: 6:00 p.m. CST
- Game weather: Sunny, 67 °F (19 °C)
- Game attendance: 2,132
- Referee: Dan Lewis
- Box score, Recap

Statistics	ECU	TAR
First downs		
Total yards		
Rushing yards		
Passing yards		
Turnovers		
Time of possession		

Team	Category	Player	Statistics
East Central	Passing		
East Central	Rushing		
East Central	Receiving		
Tarleton State	Passing		
Tarleton State	Rushing		
Tarleton State	Receiving		
