= 2020 McNeese State Cowboys football team =

American college football season

2020 McNeese State Cowboys football
- Conference: Southland Conference
- Record: 3–4 (2–4 Southland)
- Head coach: Frank Wilson (1st season)
- Offensive coordinator: Ronnie Letson (1st season)
- Defensive coordinator: Grady Brown (1st season)
- Home stadium: Cowboy Stadium

2020 Southland Conference football standings
	Conf.			Overall
Team	W		L	W		L
No. 1 Sam Houston State $^	6	–	0	10	–	0
No. 20 Southeastern Louisiana	4	–	2	4	–	3
No. 23 Nicholls	3	–	3	4	–	3
Incarnate Word	3	–	3	3	–	3
Lamar	2	–	4	2	–	4
McNeese State*	2	–	4	3	–	4
Northwestern State	1	–	5	1	–	5
$ – Conference champion; ^ – FCS playoff participant; * – Ineligible for FCS postseason play due to NCAA sanctions Note: Abilene Christian, Central Arkansas, Houston Baptist, and Stephen F. Austin played only in the fall and opted out of the spring season.; Rankings from STATS Poll

The 2020 McNeese State Cowboys football team represented McNeese State University as a member of the Southland Conference during the 2020–21 NCAA Division I FCS football season. Led by first-year head coach Frank Wilson, the Cowboys compiled an overall record of 3–4 with a mark of 2–4 in conference play, tying for fifth place in the Southland. McNeese State played home games at Cowboy Stadium in Lake Charles, Louisiana.

On August 13, McNeese State Athletic Department decided to postpone all fall sports with the intent to play in the spring. This decision canceled all games that were to be played from September through November 2020.

== Preseason ==
=== Recruiting class ===
College recruiting (2020)
Name	Hometown	School	Height	Weight	Commit date
Khaylon Chapple; Defensive Line	Haughton, LA	Haughton HS	6 ft 3 in (1.91 m)	220 lb (100 kg)	Dec 1, 2019
Khaylon Chapple; Defensive Line	Recruit ratings: Scout: Rivals: 247Sports: ESPN:				
Caron Coleman; Offensive Line	St. Louis, MO	Pattonville HS	6 ft 3 in (1.91 m)	300 lb (140 kg)	Dec 1, 2019
Caron Coleman; Offensive Line	Recruit ratings: Scout: Rivals: 247Sports: ESPN:				
Luke Howard; Tight End	Lafayette, LA	St. Thomas More Catholic HS	6 ft 4 in (1.93 m)	220 lb (100 kg)	Dec 1, 2019
Luke Howard; Tight End	Recruit ratings: Scout: Rivals: 247Sports: ESPN:				
Mason Kinsey; Defensive End	Mansfield, TX	Mansfield Legacy HS; Navarro College	6 ft 2 in (1.88 m)	230 lb (100 kg)	Dec 1, 2019
Mason Kinsey; Defensive End	Recruit ratings: Scout: Rivals: 247Sports: ESPN:				
Grayson Mays; Defensive End	Bellville, TX	Bellville HS	6 ft 2 in (1.88 m)	240 lb (110 kg)	Dec 1, 2019
Grayson Mays; Defensive End	Recruit ratings: Scout: Rivals: 247Sports: ESPN:				
Josh Parker; Running Back	Baton Rouge, LA	Catholic HS	5 ft 10 in (1.78 m)	190 lb (86 kg)	Feb 5, 2020
Josh Parker; Running Back	Recruit ratings: Scout: Rivals: 247Sports: ESPN:				
Tyler Patrick; Offensive Line	Wamego, KS	Wamego HS; Butler College	6 ft 5 in (1.96 m)	235 lb (107 kg)	Dec 1, 2019
Tyler Patrick; Offensive Line	Recruit ratings: Scout: Rivals: 247Sports: ESPN:				
Brendan Sirls; Wide Receiver	Arlington, TX	Mansfield Summit HS	6 ft 2 in (1.88 m)	185 lb (84 kg)	Dec 1, 2019
Brendan Sirls; Wide Receiver	Recruit ratings: Scout: Rivals: 247Sports: ESPN:				
Rae'kwon Starks; Cornerback	Harvey, LA	Helen Cox HS	6 ft 1 in (1.85 m)	190 lb (86 kg)	Feb 5, 2020
Rae'kwon Starks; Cornerback	Recruit ratings: Scout: Rivals: 247Sports: ESPN:				
Ridge Texada; Defensive Back	Frisco, TX	Centennial HS	5 ft 10 in (1.78 m)	170 lb (77 kg)	Dec 1, 2019
Ridge Texada; Defensive Back	Recruit ratings: Scout: Rivals: 247Sports: ESPN:				
Quad Wilson; Safety	San Antonio, TX	Brandeis HS	5 ft 9 in (1.75 m)	170 lb (77 kg)	Feb 5, 2020
Quad Wilson; Safety	Recruit ratings: Scout: Rivals: 247Sports: ESPN:				
Leon Young; Defensive Line	Dallas, TX	Cedar Hills HS	5 ft 11 in (1.80 m)	260 lb (120 kg)	Feb 5, 2020
Leon Young; Defensive Line	Recruit ratings: Scout: Rivals: 247Sports: ESPN:				

=== Preseason poll ===
The Southland Conference released their spring preseason poll in January 2021. The Cowboys were picked to finish fourth in the conference. In addition, three Bearkats were chosen to the Preseason All-Southland Team

=== Preseason All–Southland Teams ===
Offense

1st Team

- Cyron Sutton – Wide Receiver, SR

Defense

1st Team

- Darion Dunn – Defensive Back, SR

2nd Team

- Cory McCoy – Defensive Back, SR
- Cyron Sutton – Punt Returner, SR

== Schedule ==
Date	Time	Opponent	Rank	Site	TV	Result	Attendance
February 13	6:00 p.m.	at Tarleton State*		Memorial Stadium; Stephenville, TX	FSSW+	W 40–37 ^{2OT}	1,324
February 27	12:00 p.m.	Incarnate Word	No. 19	Cowboy Stadium; Lake Charles, LA	ESPN+	L 20–48	2,394
March 6	6:00 p.m.	at No. 24 Southeastern Louisiana		Strawberry Stadium; Hammond, LA	ESPN+	L 20–25	3,050
March 13	12:00 p.m.	Lamar		Cowboy Stadium; Lake Charles, LA (Battle of the Border)	ESPN+	L 26–27 ^{OT}	4,523
March 20	4:00 p.m.	at Northwestern State		Harry Turpin Stadium; Natchitoches, LA (rivalry)	CST	W 21–7	6,577
April 3	12:00 p.m.	No. 13 Nicholls		Cowboy Stadium; Lake Charles, LA	CST	W 43–31	5,289
April 10	4:00 p.m.	at No. 5 Sam Houston State		Bowers Stadium; Huntsville, TX	ESPN+	L 13–27	3,103
*Non-conference game; Rankings from STATS Poll released prior to the game; All times are in Central time

== Game summaries ==
=== At Tarleton State ===
McNeese State at Tarleton State

Team	1	2	3	4	Total
• Cowboys	10	0	0	31	41
Texans	3	7	14	7	31

- Date: February 13, 2021
- Location: Memorial Stadium
  Stephenville, TX
- Game start: 6:00 p.m. CST
- Elapsed time: 4 hours and 22 minutes
- Game attendance: 1,324
- Game weather: 28 °F (−2 °C) • Weather: Cloudy • Wind: 12 MPH
- Referee: Vidal Jones
- Television network: Fox Sports Southwest Plus

Scoring summary
1	09:15	MCNS	Jacob Abel 21-yard field goal (12 plays, 61 yards, 4:31)	MCNS 3–0
1	05:26	MCNS	Joshua Matthews 13-yard pass from Cody Orgeron (Jacob Abel kick) (3 plays, 15 yards, 0:44)	MCNS 10–0
1	03:37	TAR	Adrian Guzman 38-yard field goal (6 plays, 33 yards, 1:41)	MCNS 10–3
2	01:05	TAR	Ryheem Skinner 4-yard rush (Christian Hernandez kick) (15 plays, 73 yards, 4:25)	TIE 10–10
3	11:07	TAR	Tariq Bitson 13-yard pass from Steven Duncan (Christian Hernandez kick) (6 plays, 60 yards, 1:34)	TAR 17–10
3	02:31	TAR	Braelon Bridges 27-yard rush (Christian Hernandez kick) (10 plays, 77 yards, 3:31)	TAR 24–10
4	12:09	MCNS	Cody Orgeron 5-yard rush (Jacob Abel kick) (16 plays, 77 yards, 5:17)	TAR 24–17
4	07:39	TAR	Braelon Bridges 1-yard rush (Christian Hernandez kick) (13 plays, 83 yards, 4:24)	TAR 31–17
4	02:46	MCNS	Mason Pierce 26-yard pass from Cody Orgeron (Jacob Abel kick) (5 plays, 65 yards, 1:22)	TAR 31–24
4	00:35	MCNS	Trevor Begue 12-yard pass from Cody Orgeron (Jacob Abel kick) (7 plays, 56 yards, 2:10)	TIE 31–31
1OT		MCNS	Jacob Abel 21-yard field goal (6 plays, 22 yards)	MCNS 34–31
1OT		TAR	Adrian Guzman 34-yard field goal (4 plays, 5 yards)	TIE 34–34
2OT		TAR	Adrian Guzman 45-yard field goal (4 plays, -3 yards)	TAR 37–34
2OT		MCNS	Cody Orgeron 19-yard rush (2 plays, 25 yards)	MCNS 40–37

Statistics	McNeese State	Tarleton State
First downs	27	25
Total yards	400	408
Rushing yards	230	180
Passing yards	170	228
Turnovers	0	2
Time of possession	33:32	26:28

Team	Category	Player	Statistics
McNeese State	Passing	Cody Orgeron	14/34, 170 yards, 3 TDs
McNeese State	Rushing	Cody Orgeron	19 carries, 180 yards, 2 TDs
McNeese State	Receiving	Deonta McMahon	2 receptions, 35 yards
Tarleton State	Passing	Steven Duncan	22/39, 217 yards, 1 TD
Tarleton State	Rushing	Braelon Bridges	15 carries, 112 yards, 2 TDs
Tarleton State	Receiving	Tariq Bitson	5 receptions, 87 yards, 1 TD

=== Incarnate Word ===
Incarnate Word at McNeese State

Team	1	2	3	4	Total
• Cardinals	14	17	3	14	48
No. 19 Cowboys	3	0	7	10	20

- Date: February 27, 2021
- Location: Cowboy Stadium
  Lake Charles, LA
- Game start: 12:00 p.m. CST
- Elapsed time: 3 hours and 43 minutes
- Game attendance: 2,394
- Game weather: Cloudy
- Referee: Ed Bourgeois
- TV announcers (ESPN+): Randy McIlvoy (play-by-play), Shea Walker (analyst)

Scoring summary
1	08:13	UIW	Kaleb Ducros 35-yard pass from Cam Ward (Cade Kostroun kick) (9 plays, 80 yards, 2:24)	UIW 7–0
1	02:05	MCNS	Jacob Abel 25-yard field goal (12 plays, 64 yards, 6:01)	UIW 7–3
1	01:51	UIW	Ce'Cori Tolds 100-yard kickoff returned (Carson Mohr kick) (12 plays, 64 yards, 6:01)	UIW 14–3
2	11:37	UIW	Carson Mohr 36-yard field goal (8 plays, 44 yards, 1:45)	UIW 17–3
2	09:56	UIW	Darion Chafin 56-yard pass from Cameron Ward (Carson Mohr kick) (2 plays, 57 yards, 0:31)	UIW 24–3
2	04:40	UIW	Jaelin Campbell 27-yard pass from Cameron Ward (Carson Mohr kick) (9 plays, 85 yards, 4:13)	UIW 31–3
3	02:54	MCNS	Carlos Williams 9-yard rush (Jacob Abel kick) (17 plays, 80 yards, 6:47)	UIW 31–10
3	00:28	UIW	Carson Mohr 48-yard field goal (8 plays, 44 yards, 2:26)	UIW 34–10
4	12:24	UIW	Roger McCuller 8-yard pass from Cameron Ward (Carson Mohr kick) (5 plays, 54 yards, 1:51)	UIW 41–10
4	08:34	MCNS	Jacob Abel 27-yard field goal (8 plays, 65 yards, 3:50)	UIW 41–13
4	04:21	MCNS	Cody Orgeron 12-yard rush (Jacob Abel kick) (5 plays, 50 yards, 1:47)	UIW 41–20
4	00:33	UIW	Ameer King 3-yard pass from Kevin Yeager (Carson Mohr kick) (6 plays, 75 yards, 3:48)	UIW 48–20

Statistics	Incarnate Word	McNeese State
First downs	22	24
Total yards	518	373
Rushing yards	209	171
Passing yards	309	202
Turnovers	0	0
Time of possession	25:24	34:36

Team	Category	Player	Statistics
Incarnate Word	Passing	Cam Ward	24/35, 306 yards, 4 TDs
Incarnate Word	Rushing	Kevin Brown	10 carries, 117 yards
Incarnate Word	Receiving	Jaelin Campbell	6 receptions, 93 yards, 1 TD
McNeese State	Passing	Cody Orgeron	18/32, 202 yards
McNeese State	Rushing	Cody Orgeron	18 carries, 72 yards, 1 TD
McNeese State	Receiving	Joshua Matthews	4 receptions, 65 yards

=== At Southeastern Louisiana ===
McNeese State at Southeastern Louisiana

Team	1	2	3	4	Total
Cowboys	3	3	7	7	20
• No. 24 Lions	3	9	10	3	25

- Date: March 6, 2021
- Location: Strawberry Stadium
  Hammond, LA
- Game start: 6:00 p.m. CST
- Elapsed time: 3 hours and 18 minutes
- Game attendance: 3,050
- Game weather: 62 °F (17 °C) • Weather: Fair • Wind: 9 N MPH
- Referee: Scott Hardin
- Television network: ESPN+

Scoring summary
1	10:52	MCNS	Jacob Abel 21-yard field goal (7 plays, 17 yards, 4:08)	MCNS 3–0
1	03:51	SELA	Mateo Rengifo 27-yard field goal (12 plays, 56 yards, 4:34)	TIE 3–3
2	09:13	SELA	Mateo Rengifo 29-yard field goal (16 plays, 79 yards, 7:02)	SELA 6–3
2	05:58	MCNS	Jacob Abel 45-yard field goal (9 plays, 38 yards, 3:15)	TIE 6–6
2	00:00	SELA	CJ Turner 8-yard pass from Cole Kelley (Mateo Rengifo PAT blocked) (12 play, 80 yards, 2:02)	SELA 12–6
3	11:49	SELA	Morgan Ellison 32-yard rush (Mateo Rengifo kick) (8 plays, 75 yards, 3:11)	SELA 19–6
3	05:18	MCNS	Carlos Williams 9-yard rush (Jacob Abel kick) (7 plays, 61 yards, 2:37)	SELA 19–13
3	01:55	SELA	Mateo Rengifo 32-yard field goal (8 plays, 59 yards, 3:14)	SELA 22–13
4	14:10	MCNS	AJ Carter 2-yard rush (Jacob Abel kick) (8 plays, 67 yards, 2:39)	SELA 22–20
4	09:19	SELA	Mateo Rengifo 33-yard field goal (6 plays, 19 yards, 0:58)	SELA 25–20

Statistics	McNeese State	Southeastern Louisiana
First downs	20	26
Total yards	331	492
Rushing yards	166	191
Passing yards	165	301
Turnovers	4	1
Time of possession	30:59	29:01

Team	Category	Player	Statistics
McNeese State	Passing	Cody Orgeron	13/20, 165 yards, 2 INTs
McNeese State	Rushing	AJ Carter	15 carries, 57 yards, 1 TD
McNeese State	Receiving	Severyn Foster	2 receptions, 75 yards
Southeastern Louisiana	Passing	Cole Kelley	21/39, 301 yards, 1 TD
Southeastern Louisiana	Rushing	Morgan Ellison	15 carries, 127 yards, 1 TD
Southeastern Louisiana	Receiving	Javon Conner	5 receptions, 104 yards

=== Lamar ===
Lamar at McNeese State

Team	1	2	3	4	Total
Cardinals	3	10	0	7	20
Cowboys	13	0	0	7	20

- Date: March 13, 2021
- Location: Cowboy Stadium
  Lake Charles, LA
- Game start: 12:00 p.m. CST
- Elapsed time: 3 hours and 30 minutes
- Game attendance: 4,523
- Referee: Dan Lewis
- Television network: ESPN+

Scoring summary
1	11:05	MCNS	Mason Pierce 80-yard rush (Jacob Abel kick) (1 play, 80 yards, 0:15)	MCNS 7–0
1	06:31	LAMR	Bailey Giffen 34-yard field goal (8 plays, 58 yards, 4:34)	MCNS 7–3
1	03:52	MCNS	AJ Carter 45-yard rush (Jacob Abel PAT failed) (6 plays, 76 yards, 2:34)	MCNS 13–3
2	09:26	LAMR	Griffin Hammond 13-yard pass from Jalen Dummett (Bailey Giffen kick) (12 plays, 90 yards, 5:52)	MCNS 13–10
2	04:54	LAMR	Bailey Giffen 37-yard field goal (8 play, 27 yards, 2:49)	TIE 13–13
4	12:55	MCNS	Carlos Williams 11-yard rush (Jacob Abel kick) (10 plays, 86 yards, 4:05)	MCNS 20–13
4	04:33	LAMR	Nathan Gaskamp 5-yard pass from Jalen Dummett (Bailey Giffen kick) (9 plays, 53 yards, 4:33)	TIE 20–20
1OT		MCNS	Carlos Williams 5-yard rush (Jacob Abel PAT blocked) (4 plays, 20 yards)	MCNS 26–20
1OT		LAMR	Jalen Dummett 5-yard rush (Bailey Giffen kick) (5 plays, 25 yards)	LAMR 27–26

Statistics	Lamar	McNeese State
First downs	21	18
Total yards	330	399
Rushing yards	223	321
Passing yards	107	78
Turnovers	0	1
Time of possession	38:15	36:45

Team	Category	Player	Statistics
Lamar	Passing	Jalen Dummett	8/11, 100 yards, 2 TDs
Lamar	Rushing	Marcellus Johnson	6 carries, 86 yards
Lamar	Receiving	Kirkland Banks	4 receptions, 41 yards
McNeese State	Passing	Cody Orgeron	9/16, 78 yards, 1 INT
McNeese State	Rushing	Carlos Williams	16 carries, 90 yards, 2 TDs
McNeese State	Receiving	Jamal Pettigrew	1 reception, 31 yards

=== At Northwestern State ===
McNeese State at Northwestern State

Team	1	2	3	4	Total
• Cowboys	7	0	14	0	21
Demons	7	0	0	0	7

- Date: March 20, 2021
- Location: Harry Turpin Stadium
  Natchitoches, LA
- Game start: 4:00 p.m. CDT
- Elapsed time: 3 hours and 6 minutes
- Game attendance: 6,577
- Game weather: 55 °F (13 °C) • Weather: Cloudy • Wind: SW 6 MPH
- Referee: Ed Bourgeois
- Television network: CST

Scoring summary
1	04:42	NSU	Kendrick Price 13-yard pass from Kaleb Fletcher (Eddie Godina kick) (8 plays, 91 yards, 3:28)	NSU 7–0
1	02:07	MCNS	Jamal Pettigrew 2-yard pass from Cody Orgeron (Jacob Abel kick) (5 plays, 59 yards, 2:29)	TIE 7–7
3	13:45	MCNS	Trevor Begue 75-yard pass from Cody Orgeron (Jacob Abel kick) (3 plays, 96 yards, 1:07)	MCNS 14–7
3	07:45	MCNS	Walker Wood 1-yard rush (Jacob Abel kick) (7 plays, 66 yards, 2:30)	MCNS 21–7

Statistics	McNeese State	Northwestern State
First downs	20	21
Total yards	416	394
Rushing yards	110	33
Passing yards	306	361
Turnovers	1	2
Time of possession	30:36	29:24

Team	Category	Player	Statistics
McNeese State	Passing	Cody Orgeron	17/22, 306 yards, 2 TDs
McNeese State	Rushing	Josh Parker	16 carries, 77 yards
McNeese State	Receiving	Trevor Begue	8 receptions, 165 yards, 1 TD
Northwestern State	Passing	Kaleb Fletcher	13/18, 171 yards, 1 TD
Northwestern State	Rushing	Scooter Adams	8 carries, 37 yards
Northwestern State	Receiving	Javon Antonio	6 receptions, 103 yards

=== Nicholls ===
Nicholls at McNeese State

Team	1	2	3	4	Total
No. 13 Colonels	14	3	7	7	31
• Cowboys	3	21	7	12	43

- Date: April 3, 2021
- Location: Cowboy Stadium
  Lake Charles, LA
- Game start: 12:00 p.m. CDT
- Elapsed time: 3 hours and 40 minutes
- Game attendance: 5,289
- Referee: Vidal Jones
- Television network: CST

Scoring summary
1	07:28	NICH	Dontaze Costly 10-yard pass from Lindsey Scott Jr. (Gavin Lasseigne kick) (11 plays, 69 yards, 4:08)	NICH 7–0
1	03:22	MCNS	Jacob Abel 42-yard field goal (4 plays, 3 yards, 1:22)	NICH 7–3
1	00:08	NICH	Dai'Jean Dixon 2-yard pass from Lindsey Scott Jr. (Gavin Lasseigne kick)br/>(9 plays, 75 yards, 3:14)	NICH 14–3
2	13:43	MCNS	Mason Pierce 4-yard pass from Cody Orgeron (Jacob Abel kick) (4 play, 65 yards, 0:32)	NICH 14–10
2	07:20	MCNS	Walker Wood 4-yard rush (Jacob Abel kick) (7 plays, 86 yards, 2:59)	MCNS 17–14
2	05:47	MCNS	Mason Pierce 85-yard pass from Cody Orgeron (Jacob Abel kick) (1 play, 85 yards, 0:13)	MCNS 24–14
2	01:23	NICH	Gavin Lasseigne 26-yard field goal (11 plays, 66 yards, 4:24)	MCNS 24–17
3	12:08	MCNS	Joshua Matthews 28-yard pass from Cody Orgeron (Jacob Abel kick) (8 plays, 79 yards, 2:52)	MCNS 31–17
3	05:43	NICH	Julien Gums 8-yard rush (Gavin Lasseigne kick) (16 plays, 75 yards, 6:25)	NICH 31–24
4	12:48	MCNS	Joshua Matthews 13-yard pass from Cody Orgeron (Jacob Abel PAT failed) (2 plays, 19 yards, 0:34)	MCNS 37–24
4	11:17	NICH	Dai'Jean Dixon 11-yard pass from Lindsey Scott Jr. (Gavin Lasseigne kick) (8 plays, 75 yards, 1:31)	MCNS 37–31
4	10:21	MCNS	Deonta McMahon 67-yard rush (two-point conversion pass failed) (3 plays, 75 yards, 0:50)	MCNS 43–31

Statistics	Nicholls	McNeese State
First downs	29	21
Total yards	562	541
Rushing yards	273	187
Passing yards	289	354
Turnovers	3	2
Time of possession	35:26	24:34

Team	Category	Player	Statistics
Nicholls	Passing	Lindsey Scott Jr.	26/53, 289 yards, 3 TDs, 1 INT
Nicholls	Rushing	Lindsey Scott Jr.	28 carries, 137 yards
Nicholls	Receiving	K. J. Franklin	4 receptions, 76 yards
McNeese State	Passing	Cody Orgeron	20/27, 354 yards, 4 TDs
McNeese State	Rushing	Deonta McMahon	11 carries, 111 yards, 1 TD
McNeese State	Receiving	Joshua Matthews	7 receptions, 147 yards, 2 TDs

=== At Sam Houston State ===
McNeese State at Sam Houston State

Team	1	2	3	4	Total
Cowboys	3	0	3	7	13
• No. 5 Bearkats	7	10	10	0	27

- Date: April 10, 2021
- Location: Bowers Stadium
  Huntsville, TX
- Game start: 4:00 p.m. CDT
- Elapsed time: 3 hours and 18 minutes
- Game attendance: 3,103
- Game weather: 78 °F (26 °C) • Weather: Clear & Sunny • Wind: 9 N MPH
- Referee: Dan Lewis
- Television network: ESPN+

Scoring summary
1	07:09	MCNS	Jacob Abel 19-yard field goal (12 plays, 79 yards, 5:31)	MCNS 3–0
1	02:53	SHSU	Noah Smith 19-yard pass from Eric Schmid (Seth Morgan kick) (8 plays, 64 yards, 4:11)	SHSU 7–3
2	03:27	SHSU	Ramon Jefferson 1-yard rush (Seth Morgan kick) (7 plays, 47 yard, 3:28)	SHSU 14–3
2	00:00	SHSU	Seth Morgan 21-yard field goal (11 plays, 34 yards, 2:17)	SHSU 17–3
3	12:17	SHSU	Seth Morgan 33-yard field goal (6 plays, 49 yards, 2:37)	SHSU 20–3
3	07:43	SHSU	Donovan Williams 2-yard rush (Seth Morgan kick) (7 plays, 85 yards, 3:06)	SHSU 27–3
3	04:58	MCNS	Jacob Abel 25-yard field goal (10 plays, 68 yards, 2:45)	SHSU 27–6
4	11:18	MCNS	Joshua Matthews 24-yard pass from Cody Orgeron (Jacob Abel kick) (4 plays, 45 yards, 1:23)	SHSU 27–13

Statistics	McNeese State	Sam Houston State
First downs	19	19
Total yards	328	392
Rushing yards	37	190
Passing yards	291	202
Turnovers	1	3
Time of possession	30:02	29:58

Team	Category	Player	Statistics
McNeese State	Passing	Cody Orgeron	27/42, 291 yards, 1 TD
McNeese State	Rushing	Cody Orgeron	18 carries, 18 yards
McNeese State	Receiving	Joshua Matthews	6 receptions, 95 yards, 1 TD
Sam Houston State	Passing	Eric Schmid	12/24, 202 yards, 1 TD, 2 INTs
Sam Houston State	Rushing	Eric Schmid	15 carries, 92 yards
Sam Houston State	Receiving	Jequez Ezzard	3 receptions, 87 yards

== Roster ==
2020 McNeese State Cowboys football team roster
Players
Coaches
Offense

Pos.	#	Name	Class
WR	1	Cyron Sutton	Sr
QB	2	Cade Bartlett	Fr
RB	4	Elijah Mack	Sr
QB	8	Cody Orgeron	Sr
QB	10	Matt Keller	Sr
QB	12	Matt Gardner	Jr
WR	13	Nate Briscoe	Jr
WR	14	Draysean Hudson	Sr
WR	15	Zach Hayes	So
WR	19	Tyler Washington	Fr
RB	33	J'Uan Gross	Jr
RB	34	J'Cobi Skinner	Jr
TE	36	Dontay Hargrove	Sr
RB	37	Carlos Williams	So
TE	40	Dominic Prudhomme	Fr
TE	44	Jacob Logan	Sr
RB	47	McCaylon Thibeaux	Fr
OL	53	Kyle Herridge	Jr
OL	55	Cutter Leftwich	Jr
OL	57	Aaron McDaniel	Fr
OL	58	Tanner Pugh	Jr
OL	62	Joe Latronico	Sr
OL	63	Charley Zeno	So
OL	64	Jack Zelezinski	Fr
OL	66	Juwan Felix	Fr
OL	68	Caleb Gary	Sr
OL	71	Jamarius Bolding	Sr
OL	73	Calvin Barkat	Jr
OL	77	DeMarcus Thomas	So
OL	78	Hayden Shaw	Fr
OL	79	Nick Holiday	So
WR	81	Deon Cormier	So
WR	83	Trevor Begue	Sr
TE	84	KJ Brown	Fr
WR	86	Markel Cotten	Fr
WR	87	Markquell Stewart	Fr
WR	88	Tylin Bryant	Fr
WR	89	Mason Pierce	So
QB		Morgan Clark	Fr
RB		Ivory Roberts	Fr

Defense

Pos.	#	Name	Class
DB	1	Darion Dunn	Sr
DB	2	Cory McCoy	Sr
DB	4	Colby Burton	Sr
DB	7	Gabe Foster	Sr
DL	8	Damien DeGruy	Jr
LB	10	Darius Daniels	So
DB	16	Colby Richardson	Jr
DB	17	Darius Johnson	Sr
DB	18	Eli Johnson	So
DB	21	Andre Sam	Jr
LB	23	Kordell Williams	Jr
DB	25	Darius Shields	Fr
DB	27	Enos Lewis	Jr
DB	28	Andrew Croker	So
LB	29	Jake LaFleur	Fr
DE	30	Marcus Foster	Sr
LB	31	Dorion Pollard	Sr
LB	32	Carlos Scott	Sr
DB	35	Anthony Johnson	So
LB	41	Eric Rene	So
DE	42	Earenest Grayson, III	Fr
LB	43	Tyrell Flugence	So
LB	48	Andrew Hyacinth	Sr
DL	54	Jonathon Hageon	So
LB	56	Brayden Adams	So
DL	91	Tyrique Gibson	Jr
DL	92	Arthur Lott	Fr
DL	93	Steven Conerly	Jr
DL	94	Kaleb Wenson	Fr
DL	95	Chase Davis	Jr
DL	96	C. J. Semien	Jr
DL	97	Camron Peterson	Jr
DE	98	Logan Sonnier	Fr
LB		Blake Robinson	Fr

Special teams

Pos.	#	Name	Class
K/P	3	Noah Anderson	So
K	11	Kade Dixon	Jr
K	26	Eric Martin	So
P	38	Bailey Raborn	Sr
LS	51	Trey Vondenstein	So
LS	65	Chandler Perer	Fr

Head coach

- Frank Wilson (Nicholls State)

Coordinators/assistant coaches

- Ronnie Letson (Mississippi)
  Offensive coordinator
- Grady Brown (Alabama A&M)
  Defensive coordinator
- Gary Hyman (Humboldt State)
  Special teams coordinator
- Landon Hoefer (Texas Tech)
  Running backs
- Chris Truax (LSU)
  Offensive line
- J. B. Lageman (West Virginia)
  Defensive line
- Deron Wilson (Southern Miss)
  Defensive backs
- Will Thomas (LSU)
  Linebackers
- Blaine Gautier (Louisiana
  Wide receivers
- Kyle Washington (Angelo State)
  Offensive assistant coach
- Kyle Little
  Director of strength and conditioning
- Matt Saucier
  Head equipment manager
- Raymond Donovan
  Video coordinator
- Jim "Doc" Murphy
  Director of sports medicine
- Hunter Martin
  Assistant athletic trainer
- Matthew Bonnette
  Assistant athletic director/information director
- Alexandria Haley
  Director of student athlete services

Legend

- (C) Team captain
- (S) Suspended
- (I) Ineligible
- Injured
- Redshirt

Roster
Last update: March 22, 2020
