= 2020 Stephen F. Austin Lumberjacks football team =

American college football season

2020 Stephen F. Austin Lumberjacks football
- Conference: Southland Conference
- Record: 6–4 (1–0 Southland)
- Head coach: Colby Carthel (2nd season)
- Offensive coordinator: Matt Storm (2nd season)
- Offensive scheme: Spread
- Defensive coordinator: Scott Power (2nd season)
- Base defense: 4–3
- Home stadium: Homer Bryce Stadium

2020 Southland Conference football standings
	Conf.			Overall
Team	W		L	W		L
No. 1 Sam Houston State $^	6	–	0	10	–	0
No. 20 Southeastern Louisiana	4	–	2	4	–	3
No. 23 Nicholls	3	–	3	4	–	3
Incarnate Word	3	–	3	3	–	3
Lamar	2	–	4	2	–	4
McNeese State*	2	–	4	3	–	4
Northwestern State	1	–	5	1	–	5
$ – Conference champion; ^ – FCS playoff participant; * – Ineligible for FCS postseason play due to NCAA sanctions Note: Abilene Christian, Central Arkansas, Houston Baptist, and Stephen F. Austin played only in the fall and opted out of the spring season.; Rankings from STATS Poll

2020 NCAA Division I FCS independents football standings
	Conf.			Overall
Team	W		L	W		L
Stephen F. Austin		–		6	–	4
Tarleton State†		–		5	–	3
Central Arkansas		–		5	–	4
Presbyterian†		–		4	–	3
Eastern Kentucky		–		3	–	6
Dixie State†		–		2	–	3
Houston Baptist		–		1	–	3
Abilene Christian		–		1	–	5
Campbell		–		0	–	4
North Alabama		–		0	–	4
Note: † – Dixie State, Presbyterian, and Tarleton State played only in the spring. All other teams listed played only in the fall. Presbyterian was in a scheduling agreement with the Pioneer Football League, which it fully joined in July 2021.

The 2020 Stephen F. Austin football team represented Stephen F. Austin State University in the 2020–21 NCAA Division I FCS football season as a member of the Southland Conference. The Lumberjacks were led by second-year head coach Colby Carthel and played their home games at Homer Bryce Stadium. The team finished 6–4 for the program's first winning season since 2014. All four losses were against NCAA Division I FBS teams.

== Preseason ==
=== Preseason poll ===
The Southland Conference released their original preseason poll in July 2020. The Lumberjacks were picked to finish eighth in the conference, prior to their schedule split from the rest of the league. In addition, one Lumberjack was chosen to the Preseason All-Southland Team

Predicted finish	Team	Votes (1st place)
1	Central Arkansas*	190 (12)
2	Sam Houston State	170 (4)
3	Nicholls	169 (6)
4	Southeastern Louisiana	157
5	McNeese State	113
6	Incarnate Word	104
7	Abilene Christian*	101
8	Stephen F. Austin*	60
9	Houston Baptist*	59
10	Northwestern State	49
11	Lamar	38

(*) These teams opted out of playing in the revised spring 2021 Southland schedule, and instead played as Independent in the fall of 2020.

=== Preseason All–Southland Teams ===
Offense

2nd Team

- Xavier Gipson – Wide Receiver, SO

Defense

2nd Team

- Xavier Gipson – Kick Returner, SO

== Schedule ==
Stephen F. Austin had a game scheduled against Alabama A&M, but was canceled due to the COVID-19 pandemic.

Date	Time	Opponent	Site	TV	Result	Attendance
September 5	8:00 p.m.	at UTEP*	Sun Bowl; El Paso, TX	ESPN3	L 14–24	6,047
September 19	2:00 p.m.	at UTSA*	Alamodome; San Antonio, TX	ESPN2	L 10–24	6,611
September 26	6:00 p.m.	at SMU*	Gerald J. Ford Stadium; University Park, TX	ESPN+	L 7–50	7,898
October 3	4:00 p.m.	West Texas A&M*	Homer Bryce Stadium; Nacogdoches, TX	ESPN3	W 34–6	5,035
October 17	5:00 p.m.	Angelo State*	Homer Bryce Stadium; Nacogdoches, TX	ESPN3	W 31–12	4,376
October 24		vs. Abilene Christian	Globe Life Field; Arlington, TX	FloSports	W 35–32 ^{OT}	5,211
October 31	2:00 p.m.	Western Colorado*	Homer Bryce Stadium; Nacogdoches, TX	ESPN3	W 64–7	3,165
November 7	2:00 p.m.	at Eastern Kentucky*	Homer Bryce Stadium; Nacogdoches, TX	ESPN+	W 24–6	2,569
November 14		Pittsburg State*	Homer Bryce Stadium; Nacogdoches, TX	ESPN3	W 26–7	5,126
November 21		at Memphis*	Liberty Bowl Memorial Stadium; Memphis, TN	ESPN+	L 14–56	9,684
*Non-conference game; All times are in Central time

== Game summaries ==
=== At UTEP ===
Game One – Stephen F. Austin Lumberjacks at UTEP Miners

Quarter	1	2	3	4	Total
Lumberjacks	7	7	0	0	14
Miners	3	14	0	7	24

at Sun Bowl • El Paso, Texas

- Date: Saturday, September 5, 2020
- Game time: 8:05 p.m. CDT
- Game weather: Sunny • Temperature: 88 °F (31 °C) • Wind: E 15 mph
- Game attendance: 6,047
- Referee: Rodney Burnette • Umpire: Stephen Marshal • Linesman: Lea Bailey • Line judge: Joshua Fath • Back judge: Brandon Spencer • Field judge: Parker Anderson • Side judge: Adrian Carson • Center judge: Nathan Jastram
- TV announcers (ESPN3): Erik Elken, Trevor Vittatoe

Game information

First quarter

- (12:01) SFA – Lawton Rikel 17-yard pass from Trae Self, Chris Campos kick (Drive: 6 plays, 75 yards, 2:59; Stephen F. Austin 7–0)
- (3:25) UTEP – Gavin Baechle 22-yard field goal (Drive: 8 plays, 49 yards, 4:22; Stephen F. Austin 7–3)

Second quarter

- (12:03) SFA – Da'leon Ward 1-yard run, Chris Campos kick (Drive: 12 plays, 84 yards, 6:17; Stephen F. Austin 14–3)
- (2:08) UTEP – Justin Garrett 4-yard pass from Gavin Hardison, Gavin Baechle kick (Drive: 16 plays, 83 yards, 9:51; Stephen F. Austin 14–10)
- (0:20) UTEP – Deion Hankins 10-yard run, Gavin Baechle kick (Drive: 2 plays, 9 yards, 0:52; UTEP 17–14)

Third quarter
No scoring
Fourth quarter

- (3:51) UTEP – Deion Hankins 10-yard run, Gavin Baechle kick (Drive: 9 plays, 80 yards, 4:18; UTEP 24–14)

Statistics	SFA	UTEP
First downs	14	19
Plays–yards	44–230	65–364
Rushes–yards	97	152
Passing yards	133	212
Passing: comp–att–int	14–21–1	17–28–1
Time of possession	23:13	36:47

Team	Category	Player	Statistics
Stephen F. Austin	Passing	Trae Self	14–21–1–133
Stephen F. Austin	Rushing	Da'Leon Ward	14–51
Stephen F. Austin	Receiving	Quenty Borders	2–41
UTEP	Passing	Gavin Hardison	17–28–1–212
UTEP	Rushing	Deion Hankins	17–133
UTEP	Receiving	Jacob Cowing	7–116

=== At UTSA ===
Game Two – Stephen F. Austin Lumberjacks at UTSA Roadrunners

Quarter	1	2	3	4	Total
Lumberjacks	0	7	3	0	10
Roadrunners	3	14	0	7	24

at Alamodome • San Antonio, Texas

- Date: Saturday, September 19, 2020
- Game time: 2:42 p.m. CDT
- Game weather: Indoors • Temperature: 72 °F (22 °C)
- Game attendance: 6,611
- Referee: Chris Bynum • Umpire: Joe Nanus • Linesman: Tony Sands • Line judge: Nicholas Therio • Back judge: Sean Woodson • Field judge: Lark Jones • Side judge: Dustin Drawhorn
- TV announcers (ESPN2): Lincoln Rose, LaDarrin McLane

Game information

First quarter

- (11:34) UTSA – Hunter Duplessis 28-yard field goal (Drive: 9 plays, 64 yards, 3:26; UTSA 3–0)

Second quarter

- (13:01) UTSA – Frank Harris 3-yard run, Hunter Duplessis kick (Drive: 15 plays, 75 yards, 5:10; UTSA 10–0)
- (0:35) UTSA – Joshua Cephus 4-yard pass from Frank Harris, Hunter Duplessis kick (Drive: 9 plays, 63 yards, 1:50; UTSA 17–0)
- (0:02) SFA – Xavier Gipson 10-yard pass from Trae Self, Chris Campos kick (Drive: 4 plays, 72 yards, 0:33; UTSA 17–7)

Third quarter

- (6:06) SFA – Chris Campos 32-yard field goal (Drive: 8 plays, 71 yards, 3:58; UTSA 17–10)

Fourth quarter

- (7:08) UTSA – Frank Harris 23-yard run, Hunter Duplessis kick (Drive: 7 plays, 90 yards, 2:31; UTSA 24–10)

Statistics	SFA	UTSA
First downs	15	25
Plays–yards	61–344	84–498
Rushes–yards	59	229
Passing yards	285	269
Passing: comp–att–int	21–33–0	23–36–1
Time of possession	27:34	32:26

Team	Category	Player	Statistics
Stephen F. Austin	Passing	Trae Self	21–33–1–285, 1 TD
Stephen F. Austin	Rushing	Da'Leon Ward	12–42
Stephen F. Austin	Receiving	Xavier Gipson	6–94, 1 TD
UTSA	Passing	Frank Harris	23–36–1–269, 1 TD
UTSA	Rushing	Frank Harris	17–110, 2 TD's
UTSA	Receiving	Joshua Cephus	8–89, 1 TD

=== At SMU ===
Game Three – Stephen F. Austin Lumberjacks at SMU Mustangs

Quarter	1	2	3	4	Total
Lumberjacks	0	0	7	0	7
Mustangs	22	7	7	14	50

at Ford Stadium • Dallas, Texas

- Date: Saturday, September 26, 2020
- Game time: 6:05 p.m. CDT
- Game weather: Sunny • Temperature: 85 °F (29 °C) • Wind: SE 12 mph
- Game attendance: 7,898
- Referee: Nate Black • Umpire: Michael Powell • Linesman: Adam Loudin • Line judge: Lance Thompson • Back judge: Victor Firth • Field judge: Glen Wilson • Side judge: Ryan Robinson
- TV announcers (ESPN+): David Saltzman, LaDarrin McLane

Game information

First quarter

- (12:34) SMU – Ulysses Bentley IV 33-yard run, Chris Naggar kick blocked (Drive: 7 plays, 63 yards, 2:26; SMU 6–0)
- (6:52) SMU – Danny Gray 11-yard pass from Shane Buechele, Chris Naggar kick (Drive: 10 plays, 69 yards, 3:36; SMU 13–0)
- (4:49) SMU – Team Safety, 14 yards (SMU 15–0)
- (2:23) SMU – Kylen Granson 9-yard pass from Shane Buechele, Chris Naggar kick (Drive: 5 plays, 44 yards, 2:12; SMU 22–0)

Second quarter

- (2:21) SMU – Danny Gray 6-yard run, Chris Naggar kick (Drive: 10 plays, 68 yards, 3:19; SMU 29–0)

Third quarter

- (9:42) SMU – Ulysses Bentley IV 13-yard run, Chris Naggar kick (Drive: 6 plays, 53 yards, 2:14; SMU 36–0)
- (1:22) SFA – Trae Self 6-yard run, Chris Campos kick (Drive: 14 plays, 75 yards, 8:20; SMU 36–7)

Fourth quarter

- (8:44) SMU – Terrance Gipson 3-yard run, Chris Naggar kick (Drive: 5 plays, 54 yards, 2:16; SMU 43–7)
- (6:01) SMU – TaMerik Williams 5-yard run, Chris Naggar kick (Drive: 3 plays, 30 yards, 1:30; SMU 50–7)

Statistics	SFA	SMU
First downs	14	24
Plays–yards	67–216	65–432
Rushes–yards	51	260
Passing yards	165	172
Passing: comp–att–int	16–27–1	16–27–0
Time of possession	34:25	25:35

Team	Category	Player	Statistics
Stephen F. Austin	Passing	Trae Self	14–23–1–133
Stephen F. Austin	Rushing	Turner JaQuarion	24–52
Stephen F. Austin	Receiving	Jeremiah Miller	4-41
SMU	Passing	Shane Buechele	14–25–0–141, 2 TD's
SMU	Rushing	Ulysses Bentley IV	6–104, 2 TD's
SMU	Receiving	Kylen Granson	5–38, 1 TD

=== West Texas A&M ===
Game Four – West Texas A&M Buffaloes at Stephen F. Austin Lumberjacks

Quarter	1	2	3	4	Total
Buffaloes	0	0	3	3	6
Lumberjacks	17	0	7	10	34

at Homer Bryce Stadium • Nacogdoches, Texas

- Date: Saturday, October 3, 2020
- Game time: 4:00 p.m. CDT
- Game weather: Sunny • Temperature: 79 °F (26 °C) • Wind: SE 8 mph
- Game attendance: 5,035
- Referee: Scott Hardin • Umpire: Jeremy Epps • Linesman: Justin Gragg • Line judge: Matt Stellges • Back judge: TJ Riley • Field judge: Chris Bailey • Side judge: Nolan Dumas
- TV announcers (ESPN3): Luke Hamilton, John Wilkowski

Game information

First quarter

- (13:34) SFA – Da'leon Ward 69-yard run, Chris Campos kick (Drive: 5 plays, 80 yards, 1:26; SFA 7–0)
- (11:25) SFA – Xavier Gipson 28-yard pass from Trae Self, Chris Campos kick (Drive: 4 plays, 51 yards, 1:14; SFA 14–0)
- (0:30) SFA – Chris Campos 22-yard field goal (Drive: 14 plays, 80 yards, 7:00; SFA 17–0)

Second quarter
No scoring
Third quarter

- (10:14) WT – Mauricio Gonzales 35-yard field goal (Drive: 10 plays, 53 yards, 4:40; SFA 17–3)
- (9:03) SFA – Remi Simmons 63-yard pass from Trae Self, Chris Campos kick (Drive: 3 plays, 78 yards, 1:04; SFA 24–3)

Fourth quarter

- (13:39) SFA – Chris Campos 29-yard field goal (Drive: 17 plays, 67 yards, 8:29; SFA 27–3)
- (9:05) WT – Mauricio Gonzales 44-yard field goal (Drive: 5 plays, 19 yards, 1:22; SFA 27–6)
- (5:25) SFA – Turner JaQuarion 12-yard run, Chris Campos kick (Drive: 7 plays, 75 yards, 3:40; SFA 34–6)

Statistics	WT	SFA
First downs	17	21
Plays–yards	70–294	64–498
Rushes–yards	120	234
Passing yards	174	264
Passing: comp–att–int	16–36–1	14–26–1
Time of possession	30:01	29:59

Team	Category	Player	Statistics
WT	Passing	Nick Gerber	16–36–1–174
WT	Rushing	Khalil Harris	14–61
WT	Receiving	Devin Neal	3-61
SFA	Passing	Trae Self	12–24–1–234, 2 TD's
SFA	Rushing	Da'leon Ward	11–114, 1 TD
SFA	Receiving	Xavier Gipson	4–124, 1 TD
