= 2020 Central Arkansas Bears football team =

American college football season

2020 Central Arkansas Bears football
- Conference: Southland Conference
- Record: 5–4 (0–0 Southland)
- Head coach: Nathan Brown (3rd season)
- Offensive coordinator: Ken Collums (3rd season)
- Offensive scheme: Spread
- Defensive coordinator: Chad Williams (2nd season)
- Base defense: 4–2–5
- Home stadium: Estes Stadium

2020 Southland Conference football standings
	Conf.			Overall
Team	W		L	W		L
No. 1 Sam Houston State $^	6	–	0	10	–	0
No. 20 Southeastern Louisiana	4	–	2	4	–	3
No. 23 Nicholls	3	–	3	4	–	3
Incarnate Word	3	–	3	3	–	3
Lamar	2	–	4	2	–	4
McNeese State*	2	–	4	3	–	4
Northwestern State	1	–	5	1	–	5
$ – Conference champion; ^ – FCS playoff participant; * – Ineligible for FCS postseason play due to NCAA sanctions Note: Abilene Christian, Central Arkansas, Houston Baptist, and Stephen F. Austin played only in the fall and opted out of the spring season.; Rankings from STATS Poll

2020 NCAA Division I FCS independents football standings
	Conf.			Overall
Team	W		L	W		L
Stephen F. Austin		–		6	–	4
Tarleton State†		–		5	–	3
Central Arkansas		–		5	–	4
Presbyterian†		–		4	–	3
Eastern Kentucky		–		3	–	6
Dixie State†		–		2	–	3
Houston Baptist		–		1	–	3
Abilene Christian		–		1	–	5
Campbell		–		0	–	4
North Alabama		–		0	–	4
Note: † – Dixie State, Presbyterian, and Tarleton State played only in the spring. All other teams listed played only in the fall. Presbyterian was in a scheduling agreement with the Pioneer Football League, which it fully joined in July 2021.

The 2020 Central Arkansas Bears football team represented the University of Central Arkansas in the 2020–21 NCAA Division I FCS football season as a member of the Southland Conference. The Bears were led by third-year head coach Nathan Brown and played their home games at Estes Stadium.

== Preseason ==
=== Preseason poll ===
The Southland Conference released their original preseason poll in July 2020. The Bears were picked to finish first in the conference, prior to their schedule split from the rest of the league. In addition, thirteen Bears were chosen to the Preseason All-Southland Team

Predicted finish	Team	Votes (1st place)
1	Central Arkansas*	190 (12)
2	Sam Houston State	170 (4)
3	Nicholls	169 (6)
4	Southeastern Louisiana	157
5	McNeese State	113
6	Incarnate Word	104
7	Abilene Christian*	101
8	Stephen F. Austin*	60
9	Houston Baptist*	59
10	Northwestern State	49
11	Lamar	38

(*) These teams opted out of playing in the revised spring 2021 Southland schedule, and instead played as Independent in the fall of 2020.

=== Preseason All–Southland Teams ===
Offense

1st Team

- Breylin Smith – Quarterback, JR
- Lujuan Winningham – Wide Receiver, JR
- Jalen Hendrix – Offensive Lineman, JR
- Toby Sanderson – Offensive Lineman, SR

2nd Team

- Jack Short – Tight End/Halfback, SR
- Tyler Hudson – Wide Receiver, SO
- Hayden Ray – Kicker, JR

Defense

1st Team

- Nathan Grant – Defensive Lineman, SR
- TJ Campbell – Linebacker, JR
- Robert Rochell – Defensive Back, SR
- Cameron Myers – Kick Returner, RS-SO

2nd Team

- A'Javious Brown – Defensive Lineman, SR
- J. W. Jones – Defensive Lineman, SR

=== Roster ===
2020 Central Arkansas Bears football team roster
Players
Coaches
Offense

Pos.	#	Name	Class
QB	3	Breylin Smith	Jr
QB	7	Hunter Loyd	Fr
QB	10	Luke Hales	Jr
QB	17	Darius Bowers	So
QB	XX	Hunter Eskola	So
OL	60	Jordan Banks	Fr
OL	61	Sanderson Hines	Jr
OL	63	Toby Sanderson	Sr
OL	64	Riley Dod	Fr
OL	66	Jalan Henderson	Fr
OL	67	Chandler Knandel	Fr
OL	69	Jesse Boshears	Fr
OL	70	William Mayo	Fr
OL	71	Josh George	So
OL	72	Bakarius Collier	Fr
OL	73	Parker Ray	So
OL	75	Will Burgess	Jr
OL	76	Caleb Jones	So
OL	77	Derek Haupt	Fr
OL	78	Jaylin Hendrix	Jr
OL	79	Justin Lairy	Fr
RB	20	Marshun Douglas	Fr
RB	21	Kierre Crossley	Sr
RB	23	Trysten Smith	Fr
RB	27	Derrick Wise	Fr
RB	28	Cameron Myers	So
RB	35	Corbin Humphrey	So
RB	XX	Michael George	So
TE	19	Sam Camargo	Sr
TE	32	Justin Morris	Sr
TE	35	James Clayton	Fr
TE	41	Joshua Nix	Sr
TE	43	Garrett Thomas	Fr
TE	47	Austin Eldridge	So
TE	83	Riyada Anada	So
TE	85	Jack Short	Sr
TE	89	Haze Denton	Fr
WR	1	Tyler Hudson	So
WR	2	Jarrod Barnes	Jr
WR	5	LuJuan Winningham	Jr
WR	6	Dwight Blakey	Sr
WR	8	Tobias Enlow	Sr
WR	13	Myles Kitt-Denton	Fr
WR	80	Chris Howard	Fr
WR	81	Christian Richmond	So
WR	82	Chris Hightower	Fr
WR	84	Brandon Myers	Jr
WR	86	Noah Bush	So
WR	87	Mitchell Perkinson	Jr
WR	88	Jared Long	Fr
WR	XX	Paul Amick	So
WR	XX	Robert Springer	Fr

Defense

Pos.	#	Name	Class
DB	4	Cameron Godfrey	So
DB	7	Nick Nakwaash	Fr
DB	9	Robert Rochell	Sr
DB	11	Christian Cain	Jr
DB	12	Steve Mackey Jr.	Jr
DB	14	Leandre Rucks	Sr
DB	16	Davis Harrison	Sr
DB	22	Wesley Anusiem	Jr
DB	25	Chris Kershner	Sr
DB	26	Tamaurian Wilson	Fr
DB	29	Justin Meadows	Sr
DB	31	Kameryn Cuevas	Jr
DB	33	Deandre Lamont	Jr
DB	34	Laquez Embry	Fr
DB	36	Jackie Harvell	Jr
DB	37	Donte Jones	Fr
DB	38	Simeon Dorson	So
DB	XX	Derrick Thompson	So
DB	XX	Quin Tucker	So
DE	50	J.W. Jones	So
DE	92	Jamal Mull	Fr
DE	93	Marquez Casey	So
DE	94	Nathan Grant	Sr
DL	42	Taurean Mays	Fr
DL	49	Azuka Mgbemena	Sr
DL	55	Jalen Bedell	Jr
DL	86	Austin Norris	Sr
DL	90	A'Javius Brown	Sr
DL	91	Logan Jessup	So
DL	95	James Kitt	Fr
DL	97	Caden Brown	Jr
DL	98	D'Mani Gibson	Fr
DT	99	Alejandro Ramirez	So
LB	15	TJ Campbell	Jr
LB	18	Malik Wilson	Jr
LB	24	Darin Davenport	So
LB	39	Trenton Dunn	Sr
LB	40	Kendarrius Moore	Fr
LB	43	Jy'Kevious Hibbler	Fr
LB	45	Dre Matthews	Jr
LB	51	Nicholas Gonzales	Fr
LB	52	Dwain Hunt	Fr
LB	54	Colson Simpson	Fr
LB	56	Demetrius Charles	Fr
OLB	30	DJ Reed	Sr
OLB	46	Victor Hill	Sr
OLB	96	Jeremiah Gray	So

Special teams

Pos.	#	Name	Class
DS	48	Justin Keijers	So
DS	59	Will Siler	Jr
P	44	Seren Hughes-Ford	So
K	53	Hayden Ray	Jr
K	57	Chandler Caughron	Fr

Head coach

- Nathan Brown (Central Arkansas)

Coordinators/assistant coaches

- Brooks Hollingsworth (Central Arkansas)
  Assistant head coach/tight ends
- Ken Collums (Central Arkansas)
  Offensive coordinator/quarterbacks
- Chad Williams (Southern Miss)
  Defensive coordinator/linebackers
- Gunnar Boykin (Southern Miss)
  Offensive line/recruiting coordinator
- Tony Davis (Troy)
  Defensive line
- Ryan Howard (Central Arkansas)
  Wide receivers/special teams
- Jacob Sisk (Central Arkansas)
  Safeties
- Chaz Scales (Arkansas State)
  Cornerbacks
- Nelson Gunnell (Central Arkansas)
  Running backs
- Tayler Polk (Mississippi)
  Outside linebackers
- Dalton Withrow (Central Arkansas)
  Director of equipment operations
- Stephanie Crain
  Assistant to the head coach

Legend

- (C) Team captain
- (S) Suspended
- (I) Ineligible
- Injured
- Redshirt

Roster

== Schedule ==
Central Arkansas had a game scheduled against Missouri, which was canceled due to the COVID-19 pandemic. Due to the Southland delaying conference play until Spring 2021, Central Arkansas is playing as an independent for the 2020 season. Since they are playing more than 3 games during the fall, Central Arkansas will not participate in conference play in the spring.

Date	Time	Opponent	Rank	Site	TV	Result	Attendance
August 29 (Note: Both Austin Peay and Central Arkansas agreed to move their previously scheduled game from September 19 to August 29 after being selected to compete in the 2020 Guardian Credit Union FCS Kickoff game at the Cramton Bowl in Montgomery, AL. The game will be nationally televised and will be the only college football game played in their time slot.)	8:00 p.m.	vs. No. 13 Austin Peay*	No. 11	Crampton Bowl; Montgomery, AL (FCS Kickoff)	ESPN	W 24–17	2,000
September 3	7:00 p.m.	at UAB*	No. 11	Legion Field; Birmingham, AL	ESPN3	L 35–45	12,716
September 26	7:00 p.m.	Missouri State*	No. 11	Estes Stadium; Conway, AR	ESPN3	W 27–20	2,000
October 3	2:30 p.m.	at No. 1 North Dakota State*	No. 11	Fargodome; Fargo, ND	ESPN+	L 28–39	471
October 10	6:00 p.m.	at Arkansas State*	No. 11	Centennial Bank Stadium; Jonesboro, AR	ESPN3	L 27–50	4,561
October 17	7:00 p.m.	at Missouri State*	No. 11	Robert W. Plaster Stadium; Springfield, MO	ESPN3	W 33–24	5,489
October 24	2:00 p.m.	at Eastern Kentucky*	No. 11	Roy Kidd Stadium; Richmond, KY	ESPN3	L 28–31	2,932
October 31	3:00 p.m.	Missouri Western*^{†}	No. 11	Estes Stadium; Conway, AR	ESPN3	W 52–10	2,452
November 14	3:00 p.m.	Eastern Kentucky*	No. 11	Estes Stadium; Conway, AR	ESPN3	W 37–25	2,000
*Non-conference game; ^{†}Homecoming; Rankings from STATS Poll released prior to the game; All times are in Central time

== Game summaries ==
=== Vs. Austin Peay ===
Guardian Credit Union FCS Kickoff: Austin Peay vs. Central Arkansas

Team	1	2	3	4	Total
No. 13 Governors	7	3	0	7	17
• No. 11 Bears	0	6	7	11	24

- Date: August 29
- Location: Crampton Bowl
  Montgomery, AL
- Game start: 8:05 p.m. CDT
- Elapsed time: 3:36
- Game attendance: 2,000
- Game weather: 81 °F (27 °C), Partly Cloudy, winds NE 3 mph
- Referee: Bob Johnson • Umpire: Steve Coullias • Linesman: Ritchie Godfre • Line judge: D. LaFontaine • Back judge: Brian Kovach • Field judge: Pat Jordan • Side judge: Cedric Clark
- TV announcers (ESPN): Matt Barrie, Mike Golic Jr., and Lauren Sisler

Scoring summary
1	14:44	APSU	CJ Evans Jr. 75-yard run (Grant Paulette kick)	APSU 7–0
2	11:38	APSU	Grant Paulette 28-yard field goal	APSU 10-0
2	7:37	UCA	Hayden Ray 30-yard field goal	APSU 10-3
2	3:51	UCA	Hayden Ray 27-yard field goal	APSU 10-6
3	14:00	UCA	Kierre Crossley 34-yard run (Hayden Ray kick)	UCA 13-10
4	7:44	UCA	Hayden Ray 32-yard field goal	UCA 16-10
4	1:34	APSU	Jeremiah Oatsvall 1-yard run (Grant Paulette kick)	APSU 17-16
4	0:34	UCA	LuJuan Winningham 10-yard pass Breylin Smith (Sam Camargo pass from Breylin Smith)	UCA 24-17

Uniform combination: white helmet, white jersey, white pants w/ purple accents

=== At UAB ===
Central Arkansas at UAB

Team	1	2	3	4	Total
Bears	7	14	0	14	35
• Blazers	14	14	3	14	45

- Date: September 3
- Location: Legion Field
  Birmingham, AL
- Game start: 7:00 p.m. CDT
- Elapsed time: 3:45
- Game attendance: 12,716
- Game weather: 86 °F (30 °C), Clear, winds SW 5 mph
- Referee: Jonathan Noli • Umpire: John C. Mitchell • Linesman: Gary Calip • Line judge: Jonathan May • Back judge: Tom Healey • Field judge: Victor Sanchez • Side judge: Raymond Tate • Center judge: Chris Burnette
- TV announcers (ESPN3): Curt Bloom and Chad Pilcher

Scoring summary
1	7:03	UAB	Gerrit Young 6-yard pass from Tyler Johnston III (Matt Quinn kick)	UAB 7–0
1	2:46	UAB	Spencer Brown 5-yard run (Matt Quinn kick)	UAB 14–0
1	0:03	UCA	Cameron Myers 5-yard run (Hayden Ray kick)	UAB 14–7
2	10:50	UAB	Myon Mitchell 18-yard pass from Bryson Lucero (Matt Quinn kick)	UAB 21–7
2	5:31	UAB	Gerrit Prince 10-yard pass from Tyler Johnston III (Matt Quinn kick)	UAB 28–7
2	2:33	UCA	LuJuan Winningham 15-yard pass from Breylin Smith (Chandler Caughron kick)	UAB 28–14
2	1:21	UCA	Robert Rochell 35-yard fumble return (Chandler Caughron kick)	UAB 28–21
3	3:07	UAB	Matt Quinn 23-yard field goal	UAB 31–21
4	12:41	UAB	Lucious Stanley 8-yard run (Matt Quinn kick)	UAB 38–21
4	8:12	UAB	Jermaine Brown 30-yard run (Matt Quinn kick)	UAB 45–21
4	5:43	UCA	LuJuan Winningham 8-yard pass from Breylin Smith (Chandler Caughron kick)	UAB 45–28
4	0:32	UCA	Sam Camargo 6-yard pass from Breylin Smith (Chandler Caughron kick)	UAB 45–35

Uniform combination: white helmet, white jersey, white pants w/ purple accents

=== Missouri State ===
Missouri State at Central Arkansas

Team	1	2	3	4	Total
MOST Bears	0	17	3	0	20
• UCA Bears	0	7	6	14	27

- Date: September 26
- Location: Estes Stadium
  Conway, AR
- Game start: 7:05 p.m. CDT
- Elapsed time: 3:20
- Game attendance: 2,000
- Game weather: 68 °F (20 °C), Winds SSE 2 mph; Mostly Clear
- Referee: Ed Bourgeois • Umpire: David Williams • Linesman: Tony Wright • Line judge: Todd Allen • Back judge: Brendon Barnes • Field judge: Keith Claiborne • Side judge: Trey Castleberry
- TV announcers (ESPN3): John Liddle, Shea Walker, and Taylor Verrico

Scoring summary
2	12:04	MOST	Jose Pizano 47-yard field goal	MOST 3–0
2	10:45	MOST	Kevin Latulas returns blocked Seren Hughes-Ford punt 16-yards (Jose Pizano kick)	MOST 10-0
2	7:38	UCA	Kierre Crossley 4-yard run (Hayden Ray kick)	MOST 10-7
2	4:02	MOST	Keshun Parker 3-yard run (Jose Pizano kick)	MOST 17-7
3	8:49	MOST	Jose Pizano 31-yard field goal	UAB 20–7
3	1:24	UCA	Tyler Hudson 7-yard pass from Breylin Smith (kick failed)	UAB 20-13
4	14:48	UCA	Dre Matthews 30-yard fumble return (Hayden Ray kick)	TIED 20–20
4	14:11	UCA	Tyler Hudson 57-yard punt return (Hayden Ray kick)	UCA 27–20

Uniform combination: white helmet, purple jersey, purple pants w/ white and gray accents

=== At North Dakota State ===
Central Arkansas at North Dakota State

Team	1	2	3	4	Total
Bears	3	3	14	8	28
• Bison	0	10	8	21	39

- Date: October 3
- Location: Fargodome
  Fargo, ND
- Game start: 2:34 p.m. CDT
- Elapsed time: 3:31
- Game attendance: 471
- Game weather: 70 °F (21 °C), Indoors
- Referee: Matt Gallagher • Umpire: Tony Day • Linesman: Calvin Diggs • Line judge: Ivan Cardona • Back judge: Justin Staehr • Field judge: Stacy Jameson • Side judge: Phil Ayeni • Center judge: Jason Nickleby
- TV announcers (ESPN+): Brian Shawn, Lee Timmerman, and Ryan Gellner

Scoring summary
1	8:26	UCA	Hayden Ray 33-yard field goal	UCA 3–0
2	11:53	UCA	Hayden Ray 41-yard field goal	UCA 6–0
2	9:00	NDS	Josh Babicz 13-yard pass from Trey Lance (Jake Reinholz kick)	NDS 7–6
2	2:32	NDS	Jake Reinholz 27-yard field goal	NDS 10–6
3	14:13	NDS	Trey Lance 54-yard run (James Kaczor run)	NDS 18–6
3	12:47	UCA	Tyler Hudson 22-yard pass from Breylin Smith (Hayden Ray kick)	NDS 18–13
3	9:44	UCA	LuJuan Winningham 3-yard pass from Breylin Smith (Hayden Ray kick)	UCA 20–18
4	13:21	NDS	Trey Lance 14-yard run (Jake Reinholz kick)	NDS 25–20
4	10:35	UCA	LuJuan Winningham 11-yard pass from Breylin Smith (Breylin Smith run)	UCA 28–25
4	7:35	NDS	Hunter Luepke 23-yard pass from Trey Lance (Jake Reinholz kick)	NDS 32–28
4	1:52	NDS	Hunter Luepke 13-yard run (Jake Reinholz kick)	NDS 39–28

Uniform combination: white helmet, white jersey, white pants w/ purple accents

=== At Arkansas State ===
Central Arkansas at Arkansas State

Team	1	2	3	4	Total
Bears	3	10	0	14	27
• Red Wolves	2	21	20	7	50

- Date: October 10
- Location: Centennial Bank Stadium
  Jonesboro, AR
- Game start: 2:35 p.m. CDT
- Elapsed time: 3:45
- Game attendance: 4,561
- Game weather: 68 °F (20 °C), Winds NE 13 mph; Cloudy and Rainy
- Referee: Trennis Livingston • Umpire: Jason Yates • Linesman: Jim Kelley • Line judge: Carl Gioia • Back judge: Wayne Johnson • Field judge: Charles Green • Side judge: Brett Toney
- TV announcers (ESPN3): Roger Twibell, Pete Cordelli, and Cori Keller

Scoring summary
1	8:07	UCA	Hayden Ray 36-yard field goal	UCA 3–0
1	6:04	ASU	Team Safety	UCA 3–2
2	10:44	UCA	Hayden Ray 42-yard field goal	UCA 6–2
2	5:22	ASU	Jonathan Adams 4-yard pass from Layne Hatcher (Blake Grupe kick)	ASU 9–6
2	3:14	ASU	Samy Johnson 60-yard interception return (Blake Grupe kick)	ASU 16–6
2	1:31	UCA	LuJuan Winningham 23-yard pass from Breylin Smith (Hayden Ray kick)	ASU 16–13
2	0:29	ASU	Brandon Bowling 15-yard pass from Layne Hatcher (Blake Grupe kick)	ASU 23–13
3	13:40	ASU	Dahu Green 3-yard pass from Logan Bonner (Blake Grupe kick)	ASU 30–13
3	8:19	ASU	Jonathan Adams 22-yard pass from Layne Hatcher (Blake Grupe kick)	ASU 37–13
3	0:29	ASU	Dahu Green 20-yard pass from Logan Bonner (kick failed)	ASU 43–13
4	13:32	UCA	LuJuan Winningham 2-yard pass from Breylin Smith (Hayden Ray kick)	ASU 43–20
4	11:32	UCA	LuJuan Winningham 31-yard pass from Breylin Smith (Hayden Ray kick)	ASU 43–27
4	5:14	ASU	Corey Rucker 56=yard pass from Logan Bonner (Blake Grupe kick)	ASU 50–27

Uniform combination: grey helmet, white jersey, white pants w/ purple accents

=== At Missouri State ===
Central Arkansas at Missouri State

Team	1	2	3	4	Total
UCA Bears	-	-	-	-	0
MOST Bears	-	-	-	-	0

- Date: October 17
- Location: Robert W. Plaster Stadium
  Springfield, MO
- Referee: • Umpire: • Linesman: • Line judge: • Back judge: • Field judge: • Side judge: • Center judge:
- Television network: ESPN3

Scoring summary

Uniform combination:

=== At Eastern Kentucky ===
Central Arkansas at Eastern Kentucky

Team	1	2	3	4	Total
Bears	-	-	-	-	0
Blazers	-	-	-	-	0

- Date: October 24
- Location: Roy Kidd Stadium
  Richmond, KY
- Referee: • Umpire: • Linesman: • Line judge: • Back judge: • Field judge: • Side judge: • Center judge:

Scoring summary

Uniform combination:

=== Missouri Western ===
Missouri Western at Central Arkansas

Team	1	2	3	4	Total
Griffons	-	-	-	-	0
Bears	-	-	-	-	0

- Date: October 31
- Location: Estes Stadium
  Conway, AR
- Referee: • Umpire: • Linesman: • Line judge: • Back judge: • Field judge: • Side judge: • Center judge:
- Television network: ESPN3

Scoring summary

Uniform combination:

=== Eastern Kentucky ===
Eastern Kentucky at Central Arkansas

Team	1	2	3	4	Total
Colonels	-	-	-	-	0
Bears	-	-	-	-	0

- Date: November 14
- Location: Estes Stadium
  Conway, AR
- Referee: • Umpire: • Linesman: • Line judge: • Back judge: • Field judge: • Side judge: • Center judge:
- Television network: ESPN3

Scoring summary

Uniform combination:

=== At Louisiana ===
Central Arkansas at Louisiana

Team	1	2	3	4	Total
Bears	-	-	-	-	0
Ragin' Cajuns	-	-	-	-	0

- Date: November 21
- Location: Cajun Field
  Lafayette, LA
- Referee: • Umpire: • Linesman: • Line judge: • Back judge: • Field judge: • Side judge: • Center judge:

Scoring summary

Uniform combination:

== Players drafted into the NFL ==
Round	Pick	Player	Position	NFL Club
4	130	Robert Rochell	CB	Los Angeles Rams
