= List of Nicholls Colonels in the NFL draft =

The Nicholls Colonels football team, representing Nicholls State University, has had 16 American football players drafted into the National Football League (NFL). The highest that a Colonel has ever been drafted is the 3rd round/57th overall, which happened in 1987 with the selection of wide receiver Mark Carrier by the Tampa Bay Buccaneers. The most Colonels selected in a single NFL Draft are two. In the 1987 NFL draft, Carrier was selected by the Buccaneers and quarterback Doug Hudson by the Kansas City Chiefs.

The Washington Redskins have drafted the most Colonels with a total of three. The Chiefs, Buccaneers and Tennessee Titans/Houston Oilers are next, drafting two players each.

== Key ==
B	Back	K	Kicker	NT	Nose tackle
C	Center	LB	Linebacker	FB	Fullback
DB	Defensive back	P	Punter	HB	Halfback
DE	Defensive end	QB	Quarterback	WR	Wide receiver
DT	Defensive tackle	RB	Running back	G	Guard
E	End	T	Offensive tackle	TE	Tight end

^{*}	Inducted into Pro Football Hall of Fame

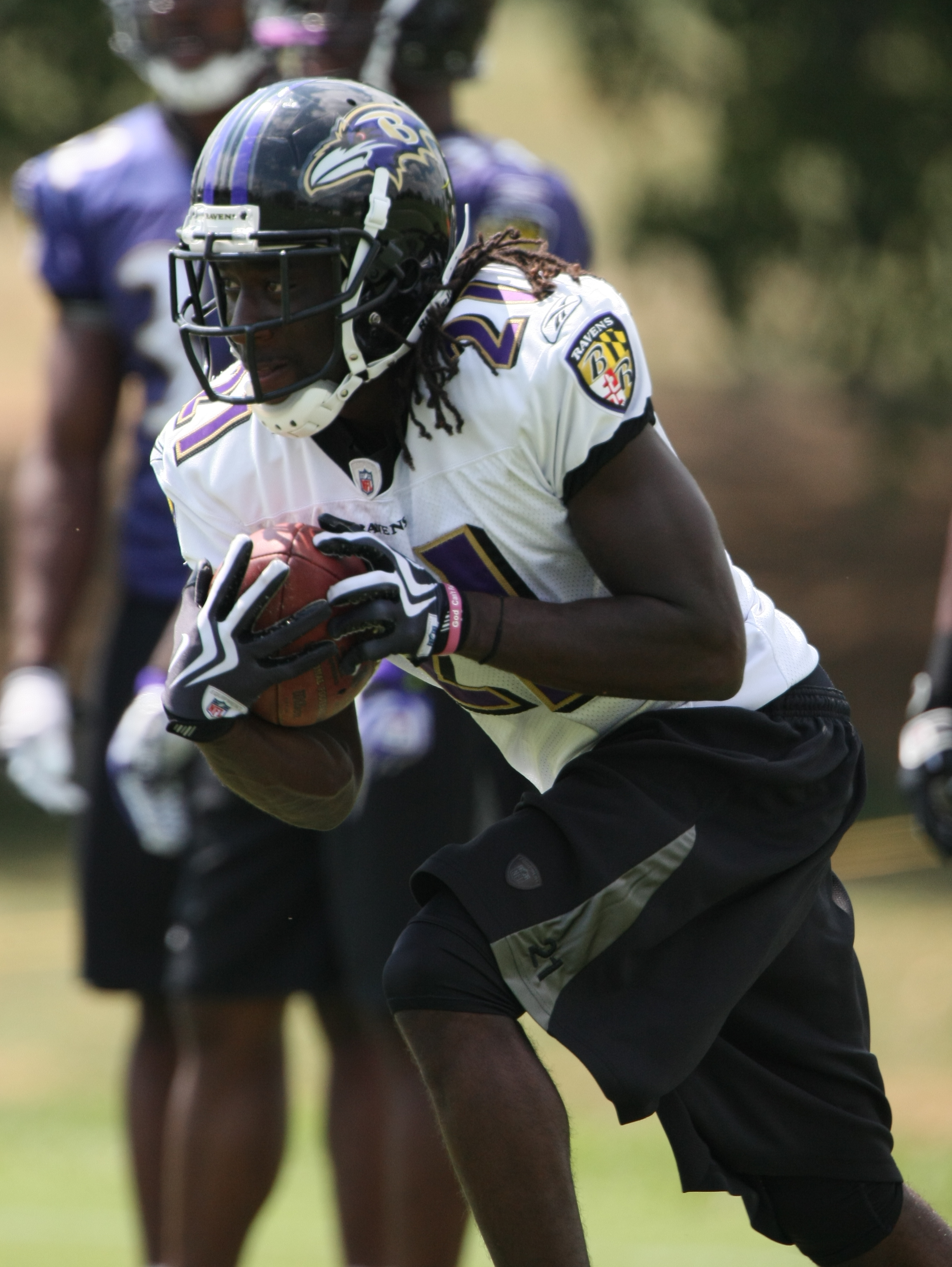
Lardarius Webb

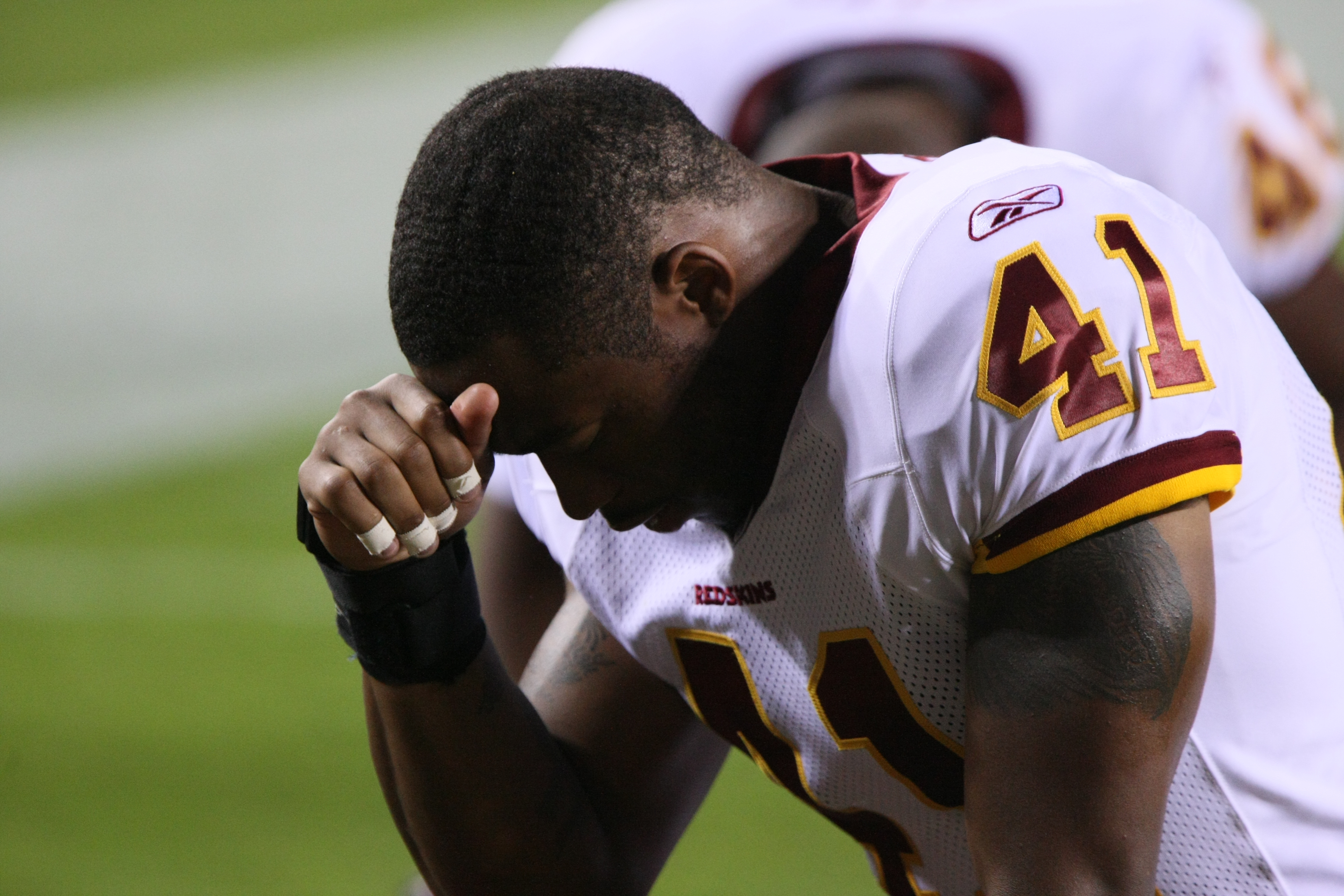
Kareem Moore

== Selections ==
Year	Round	Pick	Overall	Player	Team	Position	Notes
1976	3	14	74	Gary Barbaro	Kansas City Chiefs	DB	—
1977	7	15	182	Gerard Butler	Chicago Bears	WR	—
1982	4	4	87	Dwight Walker	Cleveland Browns	WR	—
1984	3	2	58	Johnny Meads	Houston Oilers	LB	—
1985	4	13	97	Anthony Tuggle	Cincinnati Bengals	DB	—
1985	7	17	187	Lionel Vital	Washington Redskins	RB	—
1986	5	9	119	Oscar Smith	Detroit Lions	RB	—
1987	3	1	57	Mark Carrier	Tampa Bay Buccaneers	WR	—
1987	6	18	186	Doug Hudson	Kansas City Chiefs	QB	—
1989	5	5	117	Jamie Lawson	Tampa Bay Buccaneers	FB	—
1990	10	16	264	Dee Thomas	Houston Oilers	DB	—
1995	3	4	68	Darryl Pounds	Washington Redskins	DB	—
2004	5	18	110	Chris Thompson	Jacksonville Jaguars	DB	—
2007	6	3	177	Jacob Bender	New York Jets	T	—
2008	6	14	180	Kareem Moore	Washington Redskins	DB	—
2009	3	24	88	Lardarius Webb	Baltimore Ravens	DB	—

== Notable undrafted players ==
Note: No drafts held before 1920

Debut year	Player name	Position	Debut NFL/AFL team	Notes
1978	Rusty Rebowe	LB	New Orleans Saints	
1984	Jay Pennison	C	Washington Redskins	
1985	Sheldon Andrus	DT	New Orleans Saints	
1989	Terrence Cooks	LB	New England Patriots	
2010	Antonio Robinson	WR	Chicago Bears	
2012	Bobby Felder	CB	Minnesota Vikings	
2022	Dai'Jean Dixon	WR	New Orleans Saints	
