= List of Nicholls Colonels football All-Americans =

The Nicholls Colonels football team, representing Nicholls State University, has had 15 players selected as college football All-Americans. Of those 15 players, 3 were multiple winners, as so-designated by NCAA rules. Center Jay Pennison was selected Second Team AP All-American following the 1982 and 1983 seasons. Defensive back Darryl Pounds was selected Second Team AP All-American in 1991 and First Team AP All-American in 1994. Defensive back Lardarius Webb was selected Walter Camp Foundation First Team All-American in 2007 and First Team AP All-American in 2008.

All-American selections are individual player recognitions made after each season when numerous publications release lists of their ideal team. The NCAA recognizes five All-America lists: the Associated Press (AP), American Football Coaches Association (AFCA), the Football Writers Association of America (FWAA), Sporting News (TSN), and the Walter Camp Football Foundation (WC). In order for an honoree to earn a "consensus" selection, he must be selected as first team in three of the five lists recognized by the NCAA, and "unanimous" selections must be selected as first team in all five lists.

== Key ==
=== Selectors ===
| AAB | All-America Board | AFCA | American Football Coaches of America | AP | Associated Press | | |
| CO | Collier's Weekly | CNNSI | CNN/Sports Illustrated | CP | Central Press Association | CSW | College Sports Writers |
| DW | Davis J. Walsh | ES | Ed Sullivan | FN | The Football News | FWAA | Football Writers Association of America |
| INS | International News Service | KCS | Kansas City Star | LAT | Los Angeles Times | LIB | Liberty Magazine |
| LK | Look magazine | NANA | North American Newspaper Alliance | NB | Norman E. Brown | NEA | Newspaper Editors Association |
| NL | Navy Log | NYEP | New York Evening Post | NYS | New York Sun | OF | Oscar Fraley |
| PD | Parke H. Davis | SH | Scripps-Howard | Time | Time Magazine | TSN | The Sporting News |
| UP | United Press | UPI | United Press International | WC | Walter Camp | WD | Walter Dobbins |

== Selections ==
List of All-Americans showing the year won, player, position and selectors
| Year | Player name | Position | Selector(s) |
|---|---|---|---|
| 1976 | Gerald Butler | WR | Kodak First Team (AFCA) |
| 1977 | Rusty Rebowe | LB | AP First Team; Kodak First Team (AFCA); NCAA All-American |
| 1981 | Dwight Walker | WR | AP First Team; Kodak First Team (AFCA) |
| 1982 | Clint Conque | LB | AP First Team |
| 1982 | Jay Pennison | OL | AP Second Team |
| 1983 | Jay Pennison | OL | AP Second Team |
| 1984 | Dewayne Harrison | TE | AP First Team |
| 1985 | Lynn Bychurch | OL | AP Second Team |
| 1986 | Mark Carrier | WR | AP First Team; Kodak First Team (AFCA) |
| 1987 | Alfred Dorsey | WR | AP Second Team |
| 1987 | Karl Hill | DB | AP Third Team |
| 1987 | Reed Pere’ | OL | AP Third Team |
| 1991 | Darryl Pounds | DB | AP Second Team |
| 1994 | Brian Desselles | P | AP Second Team |
| 1994 | Darryl Pounds | DB | AP First Team |
| 2007 | Kareem Moore | DB | AP Second Team |
| 2007 | Lardarius Webb | DB | Walter Camp Foundation First Team |
| 2008 | Lardarius Webb | DB | AP First Team |
