= 1987 New Orleans Saints season =

NFL team season; first playoff berth

- Owner: Tom Benson
- General manager: Jim Finks
- Head coach: Jim Mora
- Offensive coordinator: Carl Smith
- Defensive coordinator: Steve Sidwell
- Home stadium: Louisiana Superdome

Results
- Record: 12–3
- Division place: 2nd NFC West
- Playoffs: Lost Wild Card Playoffs (vs. Vikings) 10–44
- Pro Bowlers: G Brad Edelman; T Hoby Brenner; RB Reuben Mayes; LB Sam Mills; CB Dave Waymer; K Morten Andersen

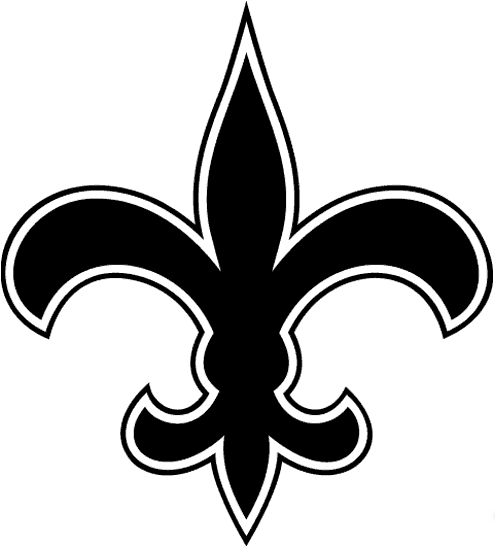
New Orleans Saints' Fleur-de-lis logo, 1967 - 1999

The 1987 New Orleans Saints season was the team's 21st year in the National Football League (NFL). The strike-shortened year was the Saints' first-ever winning season. The Saints also qualified for the postseason for the first time, riding largely on a nine-game winning streak to close the season. The Saints earned the second-best record in the NFL in 1987, but were in the same division as the team with the best record, the San Francisco 49ers, and entered the playoffs as a wild card. However, they were soundly defeated at home by the Minnesota Vikings in the Wild Card round of the playoffs, by a score of 44–10. The Vikings entered the playoffs with an 8–7 record and needed the Dallas Cowboys to defeat the St. Louis Cardinals on the final day of the season to qualify. The Saints' first winning season would be followed by another six consecutive non-losing seasons. Before the 1987 season, the Saints' non-losing seasons had consisted of only two 8–8 seasons, in 1979 and 1983. Head coach Jim Mora was named NFL Coach of the Year.

== Offseason ==
=== NFL draft ===
1987 New Orleans Saints draft
Round	Pick	Player	Position	College	Notes
1	11	Shawn Knight	Defensive end	BYU	
2	40	Lonzell Hill	Wide receiver	Washington	
3	67	Michael Adams	Cornerback	Arkansas State	
4	96	Steve Trapilo	Guard	Boston College	
5	123	Milton Mack	Cornerback	Alcorn State	
6	152	Thomas Henley	Wide receiver	Stanford	
7	179	Gene Atkins	Safety	Florida A&M	
8	207	Toi Cook	Cornerback	Stanford	
9	234	Scott Leach	Linebacker	Ohio State	
10	263	Robert Clark	Wide receiver	North Carolina Central	
11	290	Arthur Wells	Tight end	Grambling State	
12	319	Tyrone Sorrells	Guard	Georgia Tech	
Made roster

=== Undrafted free agents ===
1987 undrafted free agents of note
Player	Position	College
Vince Alexander	Running back	Southern Miss
Eric Cuffee	Wide receiver	North Texas
Tim Cunningham	Linebacker	Indiana State
Stacey Dawsey	Wide receiver	Indiana
Ted Elliott	Defensive tackle	Minnesota State
Darren Gottschalk	Tight end	Cal Lutheran
Tim Healy	Tackle	Saint John's (MN)
Jeffery Holley	Defensive back	Texas A&M
Fuzzy Huddleston	Linebacker	Ole Miss
Vince Jasper	Guard	Iowa State
Erik Kramer	Quarterback	NC State
Anthony Lewis	Cornerback	McNeese State
Kenneth Marchiol	Linebacker	Mesa
Les Miller	Defensive end	Fort Hays State
Ricky Myers	Wide receiver	Ole Miss
Victor Patterson	Guard	Minot State
Dan Rice	Running back	Michigan
Mark Russell	Linebacker	Weber State
Darin Schubeck	Linebacker	Colorado
Monte Sharpe	Wide receiver	Georgia Southern
Tony Shelman	Tight end	SMU
Todd Steele	Fullback	USC
Terry Summers	Defensive tackle	
Derrick Taylor	Defensive back	NC State
Junior Thurman	Defensive back	USC
Anthony Tuggle	Defensive back	
Lonnie White	Wide receiver	USC

== Personnel ==
=== Staff ===
1987 New Orleans Saints staff
Front office: Owner/General Partner – Tom Benson; President/General Manager – Jim Finks; Vice president of administration – Jim Miller; Director of player personnel – Bill Kuharich; Head coaches: Head coach – Jim Mora; Offensive coaches: Offensive coordinator/quarterbacks – Carl Smith; Running backs – Jim Skipper; Wide receivers – Steve Walters; Offensive line – Paul Boudreau	Defensive coaches: Defensive coordinator – Steve Sidwell; Defensive line – John Pease; Linebackers – Vic Fangio; Defensive backs – Dom Capers; Special teams coaches: Special teams/tight ends – Joe Marciano; Strength and conditioning: Strength and conditioning – Russell Paternostro

=== NFL replacement players ===
After the league decided to use replacement players during the NFLPA strike, the following team was assembled:

1987 New Orleans Saints replacement roster
Quarterbacks: 11 John Fourcade; 12 Kevin Ingram; 14 Tim Riordan; Running backs: 30 Vince Alexander (Cut); 34 Jeff Rodenberger; 42 Derrick Hughes; 43 Garland Jean-Batiste; 45 Nate Johnson; 47 Dwight Beverly; Wide receivers: 26 Stacey Dawsey(Cut); 46 Willis Jacox; 80 Joey Gunnells (walked off); 83 Dwight Walker; 84 Eric Martin; 85 Curtland Thomas; 86 Vic Harrison; 89 Joe Thomas; Tight ends: 82 Ken O'Neal; 85 Darren Gottschalk; 87 Malcolm Scott; 88 Mike Waters	Offensive linemen: 50 Phillip James; 59 James Campen; 62 Byron Barrett; 63 John Benton; 66 Kelvin Scott; 66 Sam Houston; 68 Walt Housman; 74 Bill Leach; 79 Henry Thomas; 79 Ken Kaplan; Defensive linemen: 69 Pat Swoopes; 64 Ted Elliott; 93 Kevin Young; 75 Bruce Clark; 95 Kendall Walls; 96 Sheldon Andrus; 99 Tony Elliott	Linebackers: 51 Larry McCoy; 52 Marcus Marek; 53 Keith Fourcade; 54 Bill Roe; 55 Joe DeForest; 56 Ron Weissenhofer; 58 Scott Leach; 59 Roland Myers; 91 Ken Marchiol; 98 Fuzzy Huddleston; Defensive backs: 20 John Sutton; 22 Derrick Taylor; 24 Milton Mack; 27 Antonio Gibson; 28 Gene Atkins; 29 Reggie Sutton; 32 Darrel Toussaint; 33 Junior Thurman; 38 Mike Turner; 40 Michael Adams; 48 Greg Harding; Special teams: 4 Mike Cofer K; 5 Florian Kempf K; 6 Tommy Barnhardt P

=== Roster ===
1987 New Orleans Saints roster
Quarterbacks (QB): 11 John Fourcade; 3 Bobby Hebert; 18 Dave Wilson; Running backs (RB): 37 Mel Gray; 21 Dalton Hilliard; 23 Buford Jordan; 36 Rueben Mayes; 34 Barry Word; Wide receivers (WR): 87 Lonzell Hill; 86 Mike Jones; 84 Eric Martin; 88 Mark Pattison; Tight ends (TE): 83 Cliff Benson; 85 Hoby Brenner; 82 John Tice	Offensive linemen (OL): 67 Stan Brock T; 59 James Campen C; 66 Chuck Commiskey G; 70 Bill Contz T; 72 Jim Dombrowski T; 63 Brad Edelman G; 77 Daren Gilbert T; 61 Joel Hilgenberg C; 60 Steve Korte C; 65 Steve Trapilo G; Defensive linemen (DL): 75 Bruce Clark DE; 99 Tony Elliott NT; 97 Jumpy Geathers DE; 69 Pat Swoopes NT; 73 Frank Warren DE; 94 Jim Wilks DE	Linebackers (LB): 92 James Haynes OLB; 57 Rickey Jackson OLB; 53 Vaughan Johnson ILB; 55 Joe Kohlbrand OLB; 51 Sam Mills ILB; 56 Pat Swilling OLB; 54 Alvin Toles ILB; Defensive backs (DB): 40 Michael Adams CB; 28 Gene Atkins SS; 41 Toi Cook FS; 22 Van Jakes CB; 24 Milton Mack CB; 39 Brett Maxie FS; 25 Johnnie Poe CB; 29 Reggie Sutton CB; 44 Dave Waymer CB; Special teams (ST): 7 Morten Andersen K; 10 Brian Hansen P	Reserve: 89 Robert Clark WR (IR); 27 Antonio Gibson S (IR); 78 Shawn Knight DE (IR); —- Mike Waters TE (IR); Rookies in italics

== Regular season ==
=== Schedule ===
Week	Date	Opponent	Result	Record	Venue	Attendance
1	September 13	Cleveland Browns	**W** 28–21	1–0	Louisiana Superdome	59,900
2	September 20	at Philadelphia Eagles	**L** 17–27	1–1	Veterans Stadium	57,485
–	September 27	**Atlanta Falcons**	canceled	1–1	Louisiana Superdome	
3	October 4	**Los Angeles Rams**	**W** 37–10	2–1	Louisiana Superdome	29,745
4	October 11	at St. Louis Cardinals	**L** 19–24	2–2	Busch Memorial Stadium	11,795
5	October 18	at Chicago Bears	**W** 19–17	3–2	Soldier Field	46,813
6	October 25	**San Francisco 49ers**	**L** 22–24	3–3	Louisiana Superdome	60,497
7	November 1	at **Atlanta Falcons**	**W** 38–0	4–3	Atlanta–Fulton County Stadium	42,196
8	November 8	at **Los Angeles Rams**	**W** 31–14	5–3	Los Angeles Memorial Coliseum	43,379
9	November 15	at **San Francisco 49ers**	**W** 26–24	6–3	Candlestick Park	60,436
10	November 22	New York Giants	**W** 23–14	7–3	Louisiana Superdome	67,639
11	November 29	at Pittsburgh Steelers	**W** 20–16	8–3	Three Rivers Stadium	47,896
12	December 6	Tampa Bay Buccaneers	**W** 44–34	9–3	Louisiana Superdome	66,471
13	December 13	Houston Oilers	**W** 24–10	10–3	Louisiana Superdome	68,257
14	December 20	at Cincinnati Bengals	**W** 41–24	11–3	Riverfront Stadium	43,424
15	December 27	Green Bay Packers	**W** 33–24	12–3	Louisiana Superdome	68,364
Note: Intra-division opponents are in **bold** text.

=== Standings ===
NFC West
	W	L	T	PCT	DIV	CONF	PF	PA	STK
San Francisco 49ers^{(1)}	13	2	0	.867	5–1	10–1	459	253	W6
New Orleans Saints^{(4)}	12	3	0	.800	4–1	8–3	426	283	W9
Los Angeles Rams	6	9	0	.400	1–5	5–7	317	361	L2
Atlanta Falcons	3	12	0	.200	1–4	3–8	205	436	L3

== Playoffs ==
=== NFC Wild Card Game ===
Minnesota Vikings 44, New Orleans Saints 10

Quarter	1	2	3	4	Total
Vikings	10	21	3	10	44
Saints	7	3	0	0	10

at Louisiana Superdome, New Orleans

- Game time: 12:30 p.m. EST/11:30 a.m. CST
- Game attendance: 68,127
- TV announcers (CBS): Pat Summerall and John Madden

In the Saints' first playoff game in history, the Vikings dominated the game by recording two sacks, forcing four turnovers, and allowing only 149 yards. Anthony Carter returned a punt for a touchdown, and future Saints quarterback Wade Wilson threw a Hail Mary pass for a touchdown to Hassan Jones on the last play of the first half, which was actually an untimed play after the Saints were penalized for offsides on the previous play (a half cannot end on an accepted penalty against the defense).
