= Anthony Tuggle =

American football player (born 1963)

No. 25
- Position: Defensive back

Personal information
- Born: September 13, 1963 (age 63); Baton Rouge, Louisiana, U.S.
- Listed height: 6 ft 1 in (1.85 m)
- Listed weight: 211 lb (96 kg)

Career information
- High school: Baker (Baker, Louisiana)
- College: Southern; Nicholls State
- NFL draft: 1985: 4th round, 97th overall pick

Career history
- Cincinnati Bengals (1985)*; Pittsburgh Steelers (1985); New Orleans Saints (1987)*; Pittsburgh Steelers (1987)
- * Offseason or practice squad member only
- Stats at Pro Football Reference

Anthony Ivan Tuggle (born September 13, 1963) is an American former professional football player who was a defensive back for the Pittsburgh Steelers of the National Football League (NFL) in 1985 and 1987. Tuggle was selected 97th overall in the fourth round of the 1985 NFL draft by the Cincinnati Bengals. He was also a fifth round (64th overall) selection of the Los Angeles Express in the 1985 USFL draft.

Tuggle began his college football career with the Southern Jaguars before transferring to the Nicholls State Colonels. He played high school football at Baker High School in Baker, Louisiana.
