= Jerald Sowell =

American football player (born 1974)

No. 27, 33
- Position: Fullback

Personal information
- Born: January 21, 1974 (age 52); Baton Rouge, Louisiana, U.S.
- Listed height: 6 ft 0 in (1.83 m)
- Listed weight: 237 lb (108 kg)

Career information
- High school: Baker (Baker, Louisiana)
- College: Tulane
- NFL draft: 1997: 7th round, 231st overall pick

Career history
- Green Bay Packers (1997)*; New York Jets (1997–2005); Tampa Bay Buccaneers (2006)
- * Offseason or practice squad member only

Career NFL statistics
- Rushing yards: 244
- Rushing average: 4
- Rushing touchdowns: 1
- Receptions: 148
- Receiving yards: 1,194
- Receiving touchdowns: 5
- Stats at Pro Football Reference

Jerald Monye Sowell (born January 21, 1974) is an American former professional football player who was a fullback for 10 seasons in the National Football League (NFL) with the New York Jets and Tampa Bay Buccaneers. He played college football for the Tulane Green Wave.

== Playing career ==
He holds the record for the longest play in Tulane football history, breaking off a 98-yard run against the defending national champions Alabama in 1993. Although Tulane lost the game 31–17, Sowell recorded 138 rushing yards to become the first player to run for over 100 yards against Alabama since Florida's Errict Rhett in 1991.

Sowell was selected with the 30th pick in the seventh round in the 1997 NFL draft by the Green Bay Packers. However, he never played with the Packers as he was traded to the New York Jets in his rookie year. He did not have a standout season as a Jet until the 2003 season, in which he had 47 catches. Sowell then had two more good seasons with the Jets as a receiver catching 45 and 28 passes respectively. He has 135 career special team tackles which is a Jets record. Sowell was released by the Jets after the 2005 season. He then played one year for the Tampa Bay Buccaneers.
