= Hokie Gajan =

American football player (1959–2016)

No. 46
- Position: Running back

Personal information
- Born: September 6, 1959; Baker, Louisiana, U.S.
- Died: April 11, 2016 (aged 56); New Orleans, Louisiana, U.S.
- Listed height: 5 ft 11 in (1.80 m)
- Listed weight: 220 lb (100 kg)

Career information
- High school: Baker
- College: LSU
- NFL draft: 1981: 10th round, 249th overall pick

Career history
- New Orleans Saints (1981–1987)

Career NFL statistics
- Rushing yards: 1,358
- Rushing average: 5.4
- Rushing touchdowns: 11
- Stats at Pro Football Reference

Howard Lee "Hokie" Gajan Jr. (/ˈɡaɪʒɒn/ GY-zhon; September 6, 1959 – April 11, 2016) was an American professional football player who was a running back for five seasons with the New Orleans Saints of the National Football League (NFL). He played college football for the LSU Tigers.

== Biography ==
Gajan played football at Baker High School in Baker, Louisiana, and he received a scholarship to play at Louisiana State University (LSU). He was drafted out of LSU by the New Orleans Saints in the 1981 NFL draft.

In 1984, the same season Los Angeles Rams running back Eric Dickerson set a new NFL single season rushing record, Gajan led all NFL rushers (with 100 or more attempts) in yards gained per attempt (102 carries, 615 yards; a 6.03 ypc average). Through 2015, he remains one of 19 NFL running backs to exceed six yards per carry in a (100 or more attempt) season.

Missing the 1986 season due to a knee injury, Gajan retired after the 1987 season after injuring the opposite knee. During his career, Gajan rushed for 1,358 yards and 11 touchdowns, and also had 515 receiving yards and two touchdowns.

Gajan worked as a scout for the Saints before he entered broadcasting. He was the color commentator alongside Jim Henderson on Saints radio broadcasts. In the fall of 2015, he was diagnosed with a rare cancer known as liposarcoma. Gajan died on April 11, 2016. He was the 2016 recipient of the Joe Gemelli Fleur-De-Lis Award, an annual award honoring a person for contributions to the Saints organization. Gajan's award was voted in March and was announced posthumously.
