= Dexter Dennis =

American basketball player (born 1999)

No. 9 – Shimane Susanoo Magic
- Position: Shooting guard
- League: B.League

Personal information
- Born: February 9, 1999 (age 27) Baker, Louisiana, U.S.
- Listed height: 6 ft 5 in (1.96 m)
- Listed weight: 210 lb (95 kg)

Career information
- High school: Southern University Lab School (Baton Rouge, Louisiana); Baker (Baker, Louisiana); Believe Prep Academy (Athens, Tennessee)
- College: Wichita State (2018–2022); Texas A&M (2022–2023)
- NBA draft: 2023: undrafted
- Playing career: 2023–present

Career history
- 2023: Dallas Mavericks
- 2023: →Texas Legends
- 2023–2024: Texas Legends
- 2024: Cleveland Charge
- 2024–2026: Stockton Kings
- 2026: NBA G League United
- 2026–present: Shimane Susanoo Magic

Career highlights
- NBA G League champion (2025); AAC Defensive Player of the Year (2022); AAC All-Freshman Team (2019)
- Stats at NBA.com
- Stats at Basketball Reference

Dexter Dennis (born February 9, 1999) is an American professional basketball player for the Shimane Susanoo Magic of the Japanese B.League. He played college basketball for the Wichita State Shockers and the Texas A&M Aggies.

== High school career ==
Dennis spent the first three seasons of his high school basketball career at Southern University Lab School in Baton Rouge, Louisiana. He played his senior year of high school at Baker High School in Baker, Louisiana. After graduating, Dennis spent a post-graduate season at Believe Sports Academy in Athens, Tennessee.

=== Recruiting ===
Coming out of high school, Dennis was not ranked by major recruiting services such as 247Sports.

Despite being a 0-star prospect, Dennis received offers from several universities. 247Sports reported that Dennis received 8 offers, most notably from Wichita State, Georgia, Georgia Tech, and Xavier. In April 2018, Dennis committed to the Wichita State basketball program.

== College career ==
=== Wichita State (2018–2022) ===
Dennis played four seasons at Wichita State University from 2018 to 2022. Dennis was a 4-year starter at Wichita State and started every game in his junior and senior seasons with the Shockers. In 2021, Dennis helped the Shockers to the AAC regular season title and a trip to the 2021 NCAA tournament. In the 2021 tournament, the Shockers would lose 53–52 in the First Four to Drake. In his four seasons at Wichita, Dennis played alongside future NBA players Ricky Council IV, Craig Porter Jr., and Jaime Echenique.

=== Texas A&M (2022–2023) ===
After four seasons at Wichita State, Dennis transferred to Texas A&M University. In his one year with the Aggies, Dennis started all 34 games he played in and averaged 9.5 points per game. Dennis would help the Aggies qualify for the 2023 NCAA tournament. The #7 seed Aggies would be upset by #10 seed Penn State, ending Dennis' college career.

== Professional career ==
=== Dallas Mavericks / Texas Legends (2023–2024) ===
After going undrafted in the 2023 NBA draft, Dennis signed with the Dallas Mavericks on September 22, 2023 and on October 21, his deal was converted into a two-way contract. On December 28, he was waived by the Mavericks and two days later, he joined the Texas Legends.

=== Cleveland Charge (2024) ===
On February 13, 2024, Dennis was acquired by the Cleveland Charge in exchange of the rights to Fabian White and a 2024 first-round pick.

=== Stockton Kings (2024–2026) ===
On September 25, 2024, Dennis signed with the Sacramento Kings, but was waived the same day. On October 27, he joined the Stockton Kings.

=== Shimane Susanoo Magic (2026–present) ===
On July 23, 2026, it was announced that Dennis was signing with the Shimane Susanoo Magic.

== Career statistics ==
Legend
GP	Games played	GS	Games started	MPG	Minutes per game
FG%	Field goal percentage	3P%	3-point field goal percentage	FT%	Free throw percentage
RPG	Rebounds per game	APG	Assists per game	SPG	Steals per game
BPG	Blocks per game	PPG	Points per game	**Bold**	Career high

=== NBA ===
Year	Team	GP	GS	MPG	FG%	3P%	FT%	RPG	APG	SPG	BPG	PPG
2023–24	Dallas	4	0	7.5	.526	.125	.333	2.3	1.0	.0	.3	5.5
Career		4	0	7.5	.526	.125	.333	2.3	1.0	.0	.3	5.5

=== College ===
Year	Team	GP	GS	MPG	FG%	3P%	FT%	RPG	APG	SPG	BPG	PPG
2018–19	Wichita State	**35**	25	25.9	**.399**	**.400**	.661	5.3	.9	.3	.5	8.4
2019–20	Wichita State	28	20	25.8	.348	.336	**.846**	5.0	1.1	.5	.4	9.2
2020–21	Wichita State	22	22	28.7	.367	.336	.796	4.4	.8	.7	.8	**9.6**
2021–22	Wichita State	27	27	**31.1**	.353	.297	.787	5.0	**1.6**	**.9**	**.9**	8.4
2022–23	Texas A&M	34	**34**	28.7	.392	.310	.771	**5.7**	1.2	.8	.6	9.5
Career		146	128	27.9	.373	.336	.767	5.2	1.1	.6	.6	9.0
