= Lunda Wells =

American football coach (born 1983)

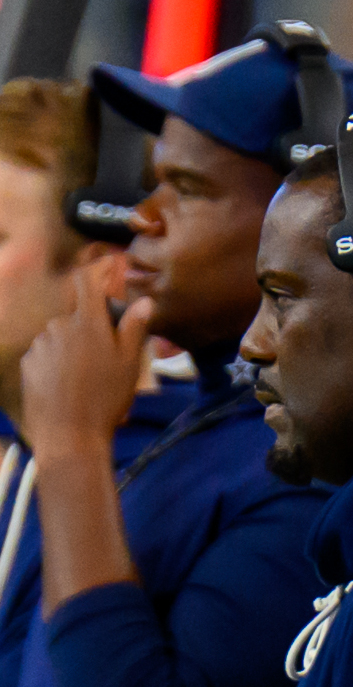
- Wells (center) in 2025

Dallas Cowboys
- Title: Tight ends coach

Personal information
- Born: February 10, 1983 (age 43); Baker, Louisiana, U.S.
- Listed height: 6 ft 2 in (1.88 m)
- Listed weight: 320 lb (145 kg)

Career information
- Position: Offensive lineman
- High school: Baker (LA)
- College: Southern

Career history
- Scotlandville High School (2006–2007) Offensive line coach, run game coordinator, strength & conditioning coach; LSU (2008–2011); Assistant offensive line coach (2008-2009); Assistant special teams coach & assistant to the head coach (2010-2011); New York Giants (2012-2019); Offensive quality control coach (2012); Assistant offensive line coach (2013-2017); Tight ends coach (2018-2019); Dallas Cowboys (2020–present) Tight ends coach

Lunda Wells (born February 10, 1983) is an American football coach and former player who is the tight ends coach for the Dallas Cowboys of the National Football League (NFL). Wells is the former tight ends coach of the New York Giants.

== Playing career ==
Wells played offensive guard for Southern University from 2002 - 2005, where he was a two-time first-team all conference selection and a team captain. He went on to play offensive line for the Grand Rapids Rampage of the Arena Football League and the Louisiana Swashbucklers of the National Indoor Football League.

== Coaching career ==
Wells began his coaching career as the offensive line coach, run game coordinator, and head strength & conditioning coach for Scotlandville High School in his hometown of Baton Rouge, Louisiana in 2006.

In 2008, he joined the coaching staff at LSU, where he spent four seasons in varying roles as an assistant coach. Wells also interned for the Dallas Cowboys, working with their offensive line during training camp in the 2010 season.

Wells received his first full-time NFL coaching position in 2012 as an offensive quality control coach for the New York Giants. Wells spent eight seasons with the Giants in several different positions, before joining the Cowboys as their tight ends coach in 2020.

On January 30, 2025, Wells and the Cowboys agreed to a contract extension.

== Personal life ==
Wells is married to Tiffany. They have two daughters, Adanya Neema and Zalika Nia.
