= City of Baker School System =

School district in Louisiana, United States

Coordinates: 30.5806°N 91.1258°W

City of Baker School System is a school district headquartered in Baker, Louisiana, United States.

The school district serves the City of Baker.

== Schools ==
All schools are located in the City of Baker.

=== Secondary schools ===
- Baker High School
- Baker Middle School

=== Elementary schools ===
- Baker Heights Elementary School
- Bakerfield Elementary School
- Park Ridge Elementary School

== Demographics ==
Total Students (as of Febuary 1, 2026): 964

Gender

- Male: 53.1%
- Female: 46.9%

Race/Ethnicity

- American Indian: 0.1%
- Asian: 0.3%
- African American: 83.2%
- Hispanic: 12.3%
- White: 2.5%
- Multiple Races (Non-Hispanic): 1.6%

Socio-Economic Indicators

- Economically Disadvantaged: 89.0%
