= Lionel Vital =

American football player (born 1963)

No. 20
- Position: Running back

Personal information
- Born: July 15, 1963 (age 63); Loreauville, Louisiana, U.S.
- Listed height: 5 ft 9 in (1.75 m)
- Listed weight: 195 lb (88 kg)

Career information
- High school: Loreauville
- College: Nicholls State
- NFL draft: 1985: 7th round, 185th overall pick

Career history

Playing
- Washington Redskins (1985); New York Giants (1986)*; Calgary Stampeders (1986); Washington Redskins (1987); Buffalo Bills (1987–1988); Detroit Lions (1988); Saskatchewan Roughriders (1989)
- * Offseason or practice squad member only

Operations
- Saskatchewan Roughriders (1990) College scout; Montreal Machine (1990–1991) Director of player personnel; Cleveland Browns (1991–1995) College scout; Baltimore Ravens (1996–1997) College scout; New York Jets (1998–1999) Southeast region scout; New England Patriots (2000) National scout; New England Patriots (2001–2004) Assistant director of college scouting; Baltimore Ravens (2005–2006) National scout; Atlanta Falcons (2007–2012) Assistant director of player personnel; Atlanta Falcons (2013–2015) Director of player personnel; Dallas Cowboys (2016–2020) Director of college scouting; Dallas Cowboys (2021) Senior personnel executive; Houston Roughnecks (2024) General manager

Awards and highlights
- 3× Super Bowl champion (XXXVI, XXXVIII, XXXIX); Grey Cup champion (1989)

Career NFL statistics
- Rushing yards: 346
- Rushing average: 4.3
- Touchdowns: 2
- Stats at Pro Football Reference

Lionel Vital (born July 15, 1963) is an American former professional football player who was a running back in the National Football League (NFL) for the Washington Redskins, Buffalo Bills and Detroit Lions. He was recently the general manager for the Houston Roughnecks of the United Football League (UFL). He was a member of the Calgary Stampeders and Saskatchewan Roughriders in the Canadian Football League (CFL). He also was a scout and director of personnel in the NFL. He played college football for the Nicholls State Colonels.

== Early life ==
Vital attended Loreauville High School, where he practiced football and baseball. He accepted a football scholarship from NCAA Division I-AA Nicholls State University. As a freshman, he was used sparingly as a kickoff returner. As a sophomore, he was a backup at running back.

As a junior in 1983, starter Oscar Smith (second rusher in school history) missed the semester due to an academic suspension, putting Vital in a position to replace him as the starter and set a single-season record with 776 rushing yards.

As a senior, Smith regained his starting position and Vital went back to a backup role. He finished his college career with 1,518 rushing yards and 9 touchdowns.

In 2017, he was inducted into the Nicholls State Athletics Hall of Fame.

== Professional career ==
Vital was selected by the Washington Redskins in the seventh round (185th overall) of the 1985 NFL draft. He was also selected by the Arizona Outlaws in the 13th round (187th overall) of the 1985 USFL draft. He was placed on the injured reserve list with a hamstring tear before the start of the season. He was waived on August 19, 1986.

On August 21, 1986, he was claimed off waivers by the New York Giants. He was released when running back Joe Morris ended his contract holdout on August 26.

In September 1986, he was signed as a free agent by the Calgary Stampeders of the Canadian Football League. On October 8, after bouncing between the practice and the active roster, he terminated his practice agreement to play outfield for the Chicago White Sox Instructional League squad.

After the players went on a strike on the third week of the 1987 season, those contests were canceled (reducing the 16 game season to 15) and the NFL decided that the games would be played with replacement players. Vital was signed to be a part of the Redskins replacement team, which was given the mock name "Redscabs" by the media. He was released after the NFL strike ended. He led the replacement games with 346 rushing yards. The rushing yards he registered in the three games, would be the NFL record for most rushing yards per game in a career (115.3) if he had played enough contests. After the strike was over, he was declared inactive from Week 7 to Week 9. He was cut on November 3.

On December 9, 1987, he was signed as a free agent by the Buffalo Bills. He was declared inactive for the last 3 games of the season. He was released off the injured reserve list on September 19, 1988.

On November 4, 1988, he signed with the Detroit Lions after running back Carl Painter was placed on the injured reserve list. He was declared inactive in one game, before being released on November 10.

In March 1989, he was signed as a free agent by the Saskatchewan Roughriders of the Canadian Football League. He was a backup running back, while contributing to the team winning the Grey Cup. He was released before the start of the season on July 13, 1990.

== Personal life ==
In 1990, he was hired by the Saskatchewan Roughriders to be a college scout. In 1991, he was originally hired by Bill Belichick to be a college scout for the Cleveland Browns. In 1996, he moved along with the team to Baltimore, to be a scout during the Baltimore Ravens inaugural 1996 season. In 1998, he was hired by the New York Jets as the southeast region scout.

In 2000, he was hired by the New England Patriots as a national scout. In 2001, he was promoted to assistant director of college scouting. In 2005, he was hired as a national scout by the Baltimore Ravens. In 2006, he received the Fritz Pollard Alliance Scouting Award, given to the top African-American scout in each conference.

In 2007, he was hired by the Atlanta Falcons as the assistant director of player personnel, reuniting with general manager Thomas Dimitroff, who was also a part of the Browns and Ravens scouting staffs. In 2011, he was promoted to Associate director of player personnel. In 2013, he was promoted to Director of player personnel. In 2016, he was hired by the Dallas Cowboys as the director of college scouting. In February 2022, he retired from the NFL.

On August 15, 2023, Vital was hired by the Houston Roughnecks.

In 2018, he received a Super Bowl ring from the Redskins for contributing to the team having a 3–0 record during the strike, winning the NFC East Division, reaching the playoffs and eventually winning Super Bowl XXII.
