= Tim Rebowe =

American football coach (born 1963)

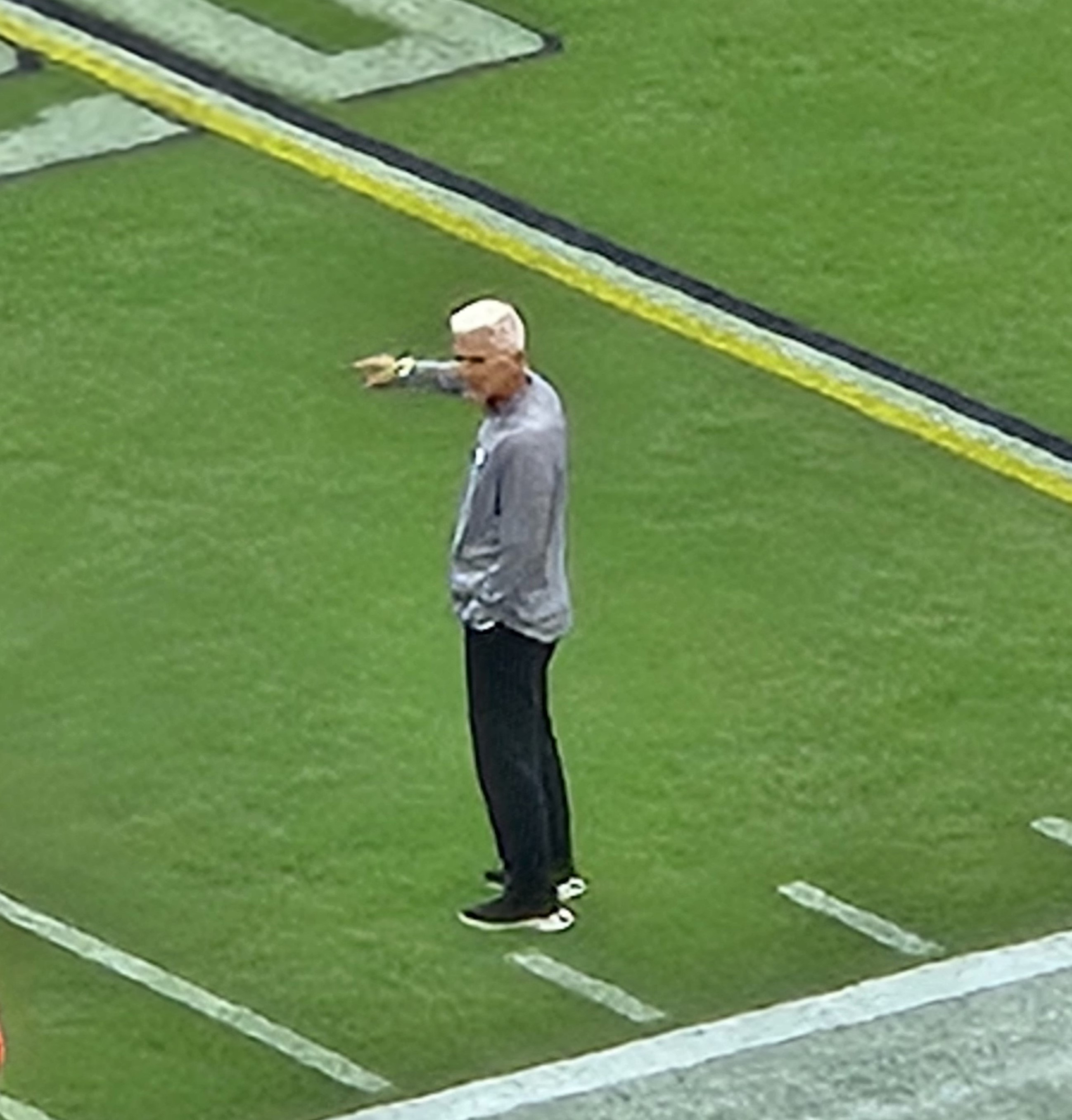
- Tim Rebowe during his tenure as Head coach at Nicholls

Biographical details
- Born: February 25, 1963 (age 63); Norco, Louisiana, U.S.

Playing career

Baseball
- 1982: Southeastern Louisiana

Coaching career (HC unless noted)

Football
- 1988–1991: Destrehan HS (LA) (DB/ST)
- 1992–1994: Destrehan HS (LA)
- 1995–1998: Nicholls State (DB/ST)
- 1999: Nicholls State (AHC/DB/RC)
- 2000: Nicholls State (WR/RC)
- 2001–2002: Louisiana–Monroe (CB)
- 2003: Louisiana–Monroe (IHC/CB)
- 2004–2007: Louisiana (S)
- 2008–2010: Louisiana (LB)
- 2011–2014: Louisiana (S)
- 2015–2024: Nicholls State / Nicholls

Head coaching record
- Overall: 57–56 (college); 26–11 (high school)
- Bowls: 2–4 (NCAA D-I playoffs)

Accomplishments and honors

Championships
- 3 SLC (2018–2019, 2023)

Timothy J. Rebowe (born February 25, 1963) is an American football coach. He was the head football coach at Nicholls State University from 2015 to 2024.

== Early life and playing career ==
Rebowe from Norco, Louisiana is an alumnus of Louisiana State University (LSU), having received a bachelor of science in physical education in 1987. Rebowe played baseball at Southeastern Louisiana University in 1982. He attended high school at Destrehan High School in Destrehan, Louisiana. Rebowe's brother, Rusty Rebowe, was an All-American linebacker at Nicholls State University and played for the New Orleans Saints.

== Coaching career ==
=== High school coach ===
==== Destrehan High School ====
Rebowe was head football coach and assistant coach at Destrehan High School in Destrehan, Louisiana from 1988 to 1994. As head coach from 1992 to 1994, Rebowe's teams compiled a 26–11 record and he led Destrehan to the 1993 Louisiana High School Athletic Association (LHSAA) Class 5A State Championship game with a 12–3 record. At Destrehan, Rebowe coached future National Football League (NFL) players Rondell Mealey and Ed Reed.

=== College assistant coach ===
==== Nicholls State ====
Rebowe was hired as an assistant football coach at Nicholls State in March 1995. He was defensive backs coach and special teams coordinator for Nicholls State from 1995 to 1998.

In 1996, Rebowe helped lead Nicholls State to its first NCAA Division I-AA playoff appearance in a decade and completed one of the greatest one-year turnarounds in NCAA Division I-AA history. That year as defensive backs coach, Rebowe helped lead the Colonels defense to a number seven national ranking in passing efficiency defense in NCAA Division I-AA.

On February 1, 1999, Rebowe was named acting head coach after head coach Darren Barbier left to accept another position. For the 1999 season under head coach Daryl Daye, Rebowe remained defensive backs coach and became recruiting coordinator while relinquishing the role of special teams coordinator. In 2000, Rebowe was wide receivers coach and recruiting coordinator.

Rebowe resigned his position at Nicholls State in January 2001.

==== Louisiana–Monroe ====
Rebowe coached cornerbacks at the University of Louisiana at Monroe from 2001 to 2003 and served as interim head coach following the 2003 season. During his time at Louisiana–Monroe, Rebowe coached Chris Harris who was a 2010 Pro Bowl selection with the Chicago Bears.

==== Louisiana–Lafayette ====
In April 2003, Rebowe was hired as an assistant coach at the University of Louisiana at Lafayette and coached safeties from 2004 to 2007. In 2004, Rebowe coached the Ragin Cajuns' pass defense to a number 11 national ranking in passing yards allowed in NCAA Division I football. Both safeties he coached on the team moved on to the NFL. Strong safety C. C. Brown was drafted by the Houston Texans in 2005 NFL draft and free safety Antwain Spann signed with the New York Giants and played for the New England Patriots. In 2005, the Ragin Cajuns' pass defense was ranked 23rd nationally, allowing only 190 yards per game.

As linebackers coach from 2008 to 2010, Rebowe coached players led the team in tackles for three years straight. In both 2008 and 2009, Antwyne Zanders and Grant Fleming were named All-Sun Belt Conference. Rebowe returned to coaching safeties starting in 2011 and remained in that role through 2014. Louisiana–Lafayette head coach Mark Hudspeth said in a November 2011 news article, "Tim Rebowe, I think, is the best recruiter in the state of Louisiana."

Rebowe left Louisiana–Lafayette to become Nicholls State head coach on November 21, 2014.

=== College head coach ===
==== Nicholls ====
On November 21, 2014, Nicholls State named Rebowe their 11th head football coach. In his first season as head coach in 2015, he compiled an overall record of 3–8. In his second season in 2016, Rebowe had a record of 5–6 and had a winning conference record of 5–4 in the Southland Conference. During the 2017 season, Rebowe compiled his first overall winning record at Nicholls State with a record of 8–4 and had a 7–2 record in conference play. The team made the 2017 Division I FCS playoffs.

In 2018, Rebowe led Nicholls to a Southland Conference championship. The team earned an automatic bid to the 2018 Division I FCS playoffs by owning a tie breaker in conference play. This was the second year in a row Nicholls qualified for the playoffs making it the first time that had occurred in school history.

In 2019, Rebowe again led Nicholls to a Southland Conference championship. The team earned an automatic bid to the 2019 Division I FCS playoffs by owning a tie breaker in conference play against Central Arkansas. It was the first time in school history Nicholls won consecutive football conference championships.

On December 1, 2024, Rebowe announced his retirement as head coach after 10 seasons. He was immediately succeeded by defensive coordinator Tommy Rybacki. He finished with a career college coaching record of 57–56, a record of 55–39 against peer FCS competition and a 49–30 record in the Southland Conference.

== Head coaching record ==
=== College ===
Year	Team	Overall	Conference	Standing	Bowl/playoffs	Coaches^{#}	STATS^{°}
Nicholls State / Nicholls Colonels (Southland Conference) (2015–2024)
2015	Nicholls State	3–8	3–6	T–8th			
2016	Nicholls State	5–6	5–4	5th			
2017	Nicholls State	8–4	7–2	T–3rd	L NCAA Division I First Round	23	25
2018	Nicholls	9–4	7–2	T–1st	L NCAA Division I Second Round	14	14
2019	Nicholls	9–5	7–2	T–1st	L NCAA Division I Second Round	14	14
2020–21	Nicholls	4–3	3–3	T–3rd		20	23
2021	Nicholls	6–5	5–3	3rd			
2022	Nicholls	3–8	3–3	T–4th			
2023	Nicholls	6–5	7–0	1st	L NCAA Division I First Round		
2024	Nicholls	4–8	2–5	8th			
Nicholls State / Nicholls:		57–56	49–30				
Total:		57–56					
National championship Conference title Conference division title or championship game berth
