= Tommy Rybacki =

American football player and coach (born 1986)

Current position
- Title: Head coach
- Team: Nicholls
- Conference: Southland
- Record: 4–8

Biographical details
- Born: July 30, 1986 (age 39)

Playing career
- 2004–2005: Jacksonville State
- Position: Linebacker

Coaching career (HC unless noted)
- 2005–2008: Jacksonville State (SA)
- 2009–2010: Jacksonville State (DA/CB)
- 2011–2012: Louisiana (OLB)
- 2013: Louisiana (S)
- 2014: Central Arkansas (CB)
- 2015–2024: Nicholls (DC/LB)
- 2025–present: Nicholls

Head coaching record
- Overall: 4–8

Tommy Rybacki (born July 30, 1986) is an American football coach and former player who is the current head coach of the Nicholls Colonels.

He played college football for the Jacksonville State Gamecocks and has previously coached for the Gamecocks, the Louisiana Ragin' Cajuns and Central Arkansas Bears.

== Early life ==
Rybacki was born on July 30, 1986, and grew up in Huntsville, Alabama. He attended Jacksonville State University, where he played football as a linebacker from 2004 to 2005. He graduated from Jacksonville State with a Bachelor of Arts degree in history and a master's degree in public administration. He married Meredith Domengeaux in 2016 and has a daughter with her.

== Coaching career ==
Rybacki began his coaching career while attending Jacksonville State in 2005, becoming a student assistant for the football team. He served in that role from 2005 to 2008 before becoming a defensive assistant and cornerbacks coach in 2009, being in that position for two seasons before then joining the Louisiana Ragin' Cajuns in 2011 as outside linebackers coach. He became the secondary coach for Louisiana in 2013, and helped the team win the Sun Belt Conference championship that year. Rybacki joined the Central Arkansas Bears in 2014 as cornerbacks coach.

Rybacki became the defensive coordinator and linebackers coach for the Nicholls Colonels in 2015 under head coach Tim Rebowe. He served 10 seasons in that position under Rebowe. In the 2024 season, he helped the Nicholls defense set the school record for rushing yards allowed, 83.9, which placed fourth nationally, and also coached the defense to force 29 turnovers which was the third-best mark in the FCS. Rebowe retired as head coach following the 2024 season and Rybacki was named his successor.

== Head coaching record ==
Year	Team	Overall	Conference	Standing	Bowl/playoffs
Nicholls Colonels (Southland Conference) (2025–present)
2025	Nicholls	4–8	4–4	T–5th	
Nicholls:		4–8	4–4		
Total:		4–8			
