= Robert Tinney =

American contemporary illustrator (1947–2026)

- Born: November 22, 1948; Penn Yan, New York
- Died: February 1, 2026 (aged 77); Baker, Louisiana
- Occupation: Contemporary illustrator

Robert Frank Tinney (November 22, 1947 – February 1, 2026) was an American contemporary illustrator known for his monthly cover illustrations for the microcomputer publication Byte Magazine spanning over a decade. In so doing, Tinney became one of the first artists to create a broad yet consistent artistic concept for the computing world, combining a specific artistic style with visual metaphor to showcase emerging trends in personal computing technology.

== Early life and work ==
Robert Frank Tinney was born in Penn Yan, New York, on November 22, 1947. He later moved with his family to Baton Rouge, Louisiana. There he attended Istrouma High School where his talent for art, and specifically illustration, became distinctly apparent. He attended Louisiana Tech University, studying illustration and graphic design. He served one tour in the United States military during the Vietnam War.

== Career ==
Following his tour of service in the military, Tinney began working as a commercial artist in Houston, Texas.

Carl Helmers, editor-in-chief for Byte, contacted Tinney about the new magazine in 1975, sending him a copy of the first issue released in September. Tinney was given the opportunity to produce the artwork for the magazine covers and his first print appeared on the December 1975 issue. Tinney created over 100 pieces of artwork for the magazine covers. By 1987, the magazine began opting for product photographs over illustrations for its cover. His final cover for the magazine was in September 1990, for its 15th anniversary issue.

His artwork for Byte was done by hand, and consisted of drawn illustrations with acrylic and airbrush.

After leaving Byte, Tinney created illustrations for commercial electronics companies. He created the cover art for Borland's Turbo Prolog and Turbo Basic languages.

== Personal life ==
Tinney was married to Susan Tinney. The couple had three children. He died at the River Oaks Nursing & Rehabilitation Center in Baker, Louisiana, on February 1, 2026, at the age of 78.
