= Central Catholic High School (Morgan City, Louisiana) =

School in Morgan City, United States

Location
- 2100 Cedar Street; Morgan City, (St. Mary Parish), Louisiana 70380; United States; 29°42′47″N 91°12′26″W

Information
- Type: Private, Coeducational
- Religious affiliation: Roman Catholic
- Established: 1892
- Principal: Peter Boudreaux
- Grades: 7–12
- Colors: Red, white, and navy
- Team name: Eagles
- Accreditation: Southern Association of Colleges and Schools
- Dean of Discipline: Tyler Jensen
- Athletic Director: Larry "Ree" Case
- Website: eaglesccs.org/

Central Catholic High School is a private, Catholic high school in Morgan City, Louisiana. It is located in the Roman Catholic Diocese of Houma-Thibodaux.

== Background ==
Central Catholic was established in 1892 by the Marianites of Holy Cross.

== Laptops ==
The high school of Central Catholic (along with the 8th grade honors class) are required to purchase laptops. The brand that can be purchased are Acers and Hewlett-Packard (HP) Computers. The principal, Deacon Vic Bonnaffae wants to offer a new way of taking notes and accessing Central Catholic related subjects from the internet. Also, laptops are used to access PlusPortals, a website in which teachers can post student grades and activities on a private calendar only viewable by the students account.

=== Non-school laptops ===
Seventh graders and remedial eighth graders are allowed to bring laptops from home. If the student violates the acceptable use policy, the laptop will not be allowed to be brought to school.

== Junior high ==
With the majority of the students attending High School, Vic Bonnaffee appointed Stefanie Gautreaux as Junior High coordinator, instead of starting a new school. The Junior High attend classes upstairs (with the exception of physical education in the gym) Only two of the many high school classes are upstairs, which are Financial Math (seniors) and Keyboarding Applications (freshmen).

== Uniform ==
Central Catholic High School uniforms originally consisted with either a white or red collar shirt, until recently (2007) in which the red collar shirt was replaced by navy blue. This is the standard uniform, with the exception of spirit days and dress days (see below).

=== Uniform policy/discipline ===
The official Central Catholic shirt must be tucked in at all times. The shirt must be buttoned and the collar must be worn appropriately. A belt must also be worn while on campus. Central Catholic shoes must also be purchased from a uniform store. Originally, if the policy was violated, the student would pick weeds in the garden after school until 2006 when the rule was if the student violated the uniform, he would wear the dress uniform for one week.

== Discipline ==
If a student is misbehaving in class (after warnings) the student would receive a referral to Chris Sanders, the dean of students. Depending on the seriousness of the violation, the student might not see the dean until after several referrals.

== Other information ==
Central Catholic has a library, and a mall for study time. It also offers troubled students a chance to meet with the guidance counselor. Dress days occur on Thursday (unless an advanced notice is posted/announced), a day in which the student body wears a dress shirt and a tie.

Deacon Vic Bonnaffee retired as principal of Central Catholic High School at the end of the 2018-2019 school year. He was replaced by Peter Boudreaux, former assistant superintendent of St. Mary Parish Public Schools

== Athletics ==
Central Catholic High athletics competes in the LHSAA.

The school sponsors a variety of sports, including:

- American football
- Basketball (girls and boys)
- Baseball
- Tennis
- Bowling
- Golf
- Softball
- Volleyball
- Soccer
- Cross Country
- Track

== Notable alumni ==
- Jermaine Jones, former AFL, NFL and CFL player.
- Dee Thomas, former NFL and CFL player.
