= Sheldon Andrus =

American football player (born 1962)

No. 96
- Position: Defensive tackle

Personal information
- Born: October 5, 1962 (age 64); Lafayette, Louisiana, U.S.
- Listed height: 6 ft 2 in (1.88 m)
- Listed weight: 271 lb (123 kg)

Career information
- High school: Port Barre (Port Barre, Louisiana)
- College: Nicholls State (1981–1984)
- NFL draft: 1985: undrafted

Career history
- San Francisco 49ers (1985)*; New Orleans Saints (1986–1987)
- * Offseason or practice squad member only
- Stats at Pro Football Reference

Sheldon James Andrus Jr. (born October 5, 1962) is an American former professional football player who was a defensive tackle for two seasons with the New Orleans Saints of the National Football League (NFL). He played college football for the Nicholls Colonels.

== Early life and college ==
Sheldon James Andrus Jr. was born on October 5, 1962, in Lafayette, Louisiana. He attended Port Barre High School in Port Barre, Louisiana.

Andrus was a four-year letterman for the Nicholls State Colonels of Nicholls State University from 1981 to 1984. He started 44 consecutive games during his college career.

== Professional career ==
Andrus signed with the San Francisco 49ers on May 15, 1985, after going undrafted in the 1985 NFL draft. He was released on August 20, 1985.

Andrus was signed by the New Orleans Saints on May 15, 1986. He was placed on injured reserve on August 19, released on December 18, and promoted to the active roster on December 20, 1986. He played in one game for the Saints during the 1986 season. Andrus was released the next year on September 7, 1987. On September 23, he signed with the Saints again during the 1987 NFL players strike. He played in all three strike games, starting one, for the Saints. He was released on October 19, 1987, after the strike ended.
