= Dee Thomas =

American gridiron football player (born 1967)

No. 36, 24, 20
- Position: Defensive back

Personal information
- Born: November 7, 1967 (age 58); Morgan City, Louisiana, U.S.
- Listed height: 5 ft 10 in (1.78 m)
- Listed weight: 176 lb (80 kg)

Career information
- High school: Central Catholic (Morgan City)
- College: Nicholls State
- NFL draft: 1990: 10th round, 264th overall pick

Career history
- Houston Oilers (1990); Montreal Machine (1992); Toronto Argonauts (1994)
- Stats at Pro Football Reference

Dee Thomas (born November 7, 1967) is an American former professional football player who was a defensive back in the National Football League (NFL) for the Houston Oilers, Montreal Machine in the World League of American Football (WLAF) and the Canadian Football League (CFL). He played college football for the Nicholls State Colonels and was selected in the tenth round of the 1990 NFL draft.

== Professional career ==
Thomas played for the Houston Oilers during the 1990 season. After the season, Thomas was protected in Plan B, but he did not play for Oilers during the 1991 season. In 1992, Thomas played in the World League of American Football with the Montreal Machine where he earned a contract with the Washington Redskins at the conclusion of the WLAF's 10 game season. While in Montreal, he was invited to tryout for the Montreal Expos baseball team, but decided to concentrate on football. Thomas suffered from ankle and back injuries during Redskins mini-camp and training camp and was released by the Redskins. In 1993 and 1994, Thomas played in the Canadian Football League with the Calgary Stampeders, Toronto Argonauts and Sacramento Gold Miners. He retired from professional football in 1994.

== College career ==
Thomas was undersized at 120 lbs and from a small high school, so he was not offered a college scholarship. Head football coach at Nicholls State, Sonny Jackson, allowed Thomas to walk-on (non-scholarship) to the football team in 1985. He went on to start at cornerback and free safety in every college game in which he appeared. During his college career, he amassed 185 total tackles (103 solo tackles with 82 assisted tackles) and 12 interceptions which was 3rd all-time in Nicholls State history. Thomas still holds the record for most yardage on interception returns at the school. During his junior season, he led the team with 7 interceptions with two picks returned for touchdowns. In his senior year, he won numerous pre- and post-season awards.

== High school career ==
Thomas was a standout high school athlete at Central Catholic High School in Morgan City, Louisiana where he earned All State honors in four sports.
