= Garland Jean-Batiste =

American football player (born 1965)

No. 43
- Position: Running back

Personal information
- Born: April 2, 1965 (age 61); Lafeyette, Louisiana, U.S.
- Listed height: 6 ft 0 in (1.83 m)
- Listed weight: 208 lb (94 kg)

Career information
- High school: St. Martinville (LA)
- College: LSU
- NFL draft: 1987: undrafted

Career history
- New Orleans Saints (1987)

Career NFL statistics
- Games played: 3
- Rush attempts: 8
- Rushing yards: 18
- Stats at Pro Football Reference

Garland Anthony Jean-Batiste (born April 2, 1965) is an American former professional football player who was a running back for the New Orleans Saints of the National Football League (NFL). He played college football for the LSU Tigers. He played three games for the Saints as a replacement player in 1987.

== Early life ==
Jean-Batiste was born on April 2, 1965, in Lafeyette, Louisiana. He went to high school at St. Martinville (LA).

== College career ==
He went to college at Louisiana State University. In 1983 he only had 1 rush in one game but it went for 58 yards.

In 1984 he played in 8 games and had 32 rushes for 145 yards and a touchdown. He also had 2 receptions for 9 yards.

In 1985 he had 23 rushes for 89 yards. He also had 1 catch for 4 yards.

In 1986 Garland Jean-Batiste had 50 rushes for 260 yards. He also had 8 catches for 50 yards and a touchdown.

== Professional career ==
He was signed as a replacement player by the New Orleans Saints in 1987. He played in week 4 to 6. In week 6 he had his only statistics; 8 rushes for 18 yards in a 19–17 win against the Chicago Bears. That was his last game.
