= Vic Harrison =

Australian rules footballer, born 1911

Personal information
- Full name: Victor Charles Harrison
- Born: 13 January 1911; South Yarra, Victoria
- Died: 24 September 1987 (aged 76); Balwyn North, Victoria

Playing career^{1}
Years	Club	Games (Goals)
1935	Geelong	2 (0)
- ^{1} Playing statistics correct to the end of 1935.

Victor Charles Harrison (13 January 1911 – 24 September 1987) was an Australian rules footballer who played with Geelong in the Victorian Football League (VFL).
