= Ken O'Neal =

American football player (born 1962)

No. 83 (Panthers), 85 (Express), 82 (Saints)
- Position: Tight end

Personal information
- Born: June 21, 1962 (age 64); San Francisco, California, U.S.
- Listed height: 6 ft 3 in (1.91 m)
- Listed weight: 240 lb (109 kg)

Career information
- High school: Berkeley (Berkeley, California)
- College: Idaho State
- NFL draft: 1984: undrafted

Career history
- Michigan Panthers (1984); Los Angeles Express (1985); New Orleans Saints (1987)

Career NFL statistics
- Games played: 2
- Touchdowns: 1
- Stats at Pro Football Reference

Kenneth Adrian O'Neal (born June 21, 1962) is an American former professional football player who was a tight end for one season with the New Orleans Saints of the National Football League (NFL). He also played in the United States Football League (USFL) for the Michigan Panthers and Los Angeles Express. He played college football for the Idaho State Bengals.

== Early life and college ==
Ken O'Neal was born on June 21, 1962, in San Francisco, California. He went to high school at Berkeley (CA); He went to college at Idaho State University.

== Professional career ==
In 1984 he played with the Michigan Panthers of the USFL. He was selected in the 8th round (160) by them. He played in three games and had one catch for 16 yards.

In 1985 O'Neal played for the Los Angeles Express. He had 6 catches for 52 yards and a touchdown.

In 1987 he was signed as a replacement player for the New Orleans Saints. In week 4 he had 1 catch for one yard and a touchdown. In week 5 he had 2 catches for 9 yards.
