= Baker High School (Louisiana) =

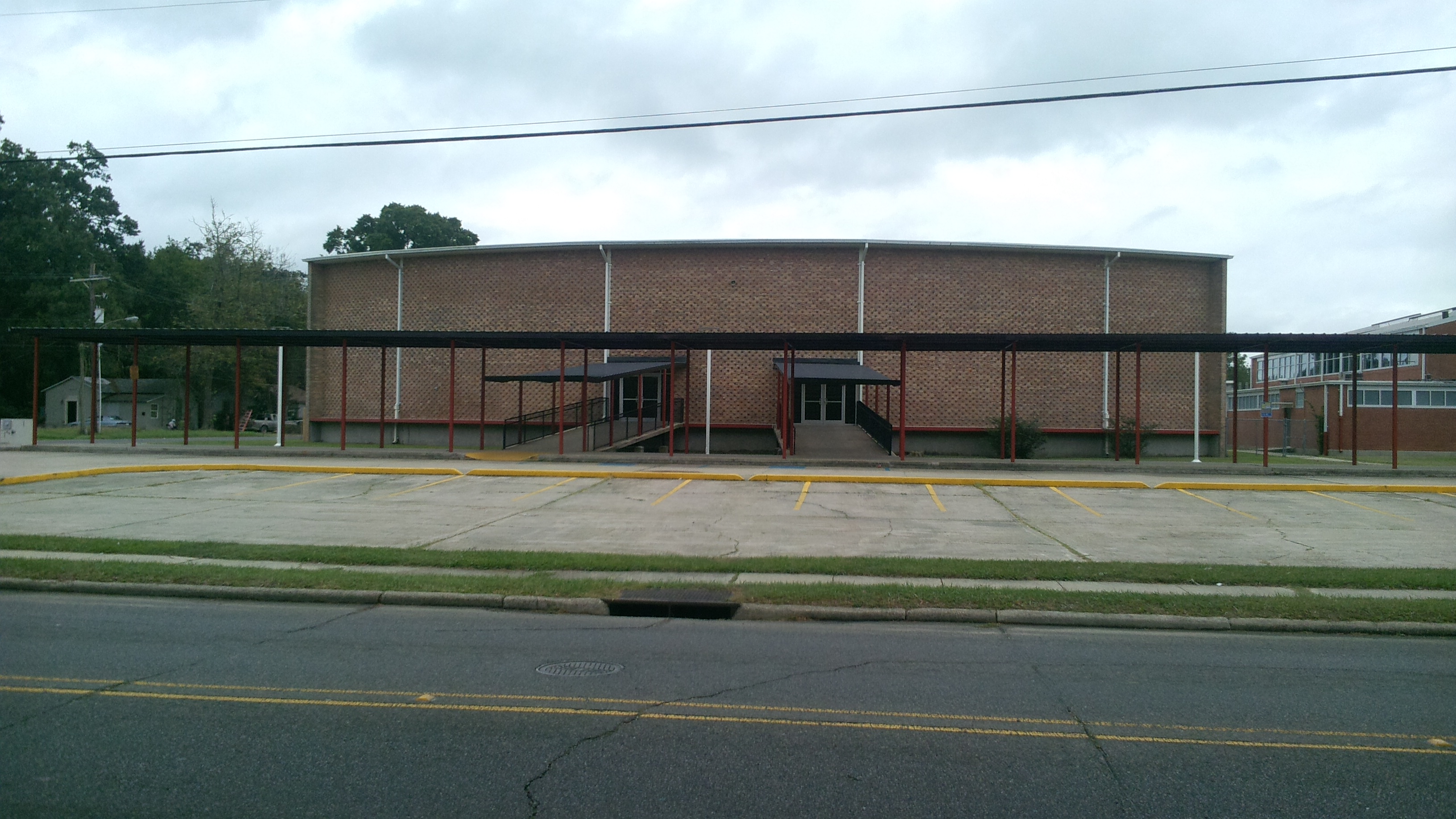

Location
- 3200 Groom Road; Baker, Louisiana 70714; United States; 30°35′16″N 91°09′58″W

Information
- Type: Public high school
- Motto: "Where the Buffalo Roam"
- School district: City of Baker School System
- CEEB code: 190145
- Principal: Candace Russell
- Teaching staff: 20.50 (FTE)
- Grades: 9–12
- Enrollment: 370 (2024-2025)
- Student to teacher ratio: 18.05
- Colors: Red, black, and white
- Athletics: LHSAA 2A
- Mascot: Buffalo (Buffs)
- Rival: McKinley, Mentorship, Capitol, Collegiate, Northeast
- Yearbook: The Buff
- Website: www.bakerschools.org/schools/baker-high-school/
- Baker High School Auditorium
- U.S. National Register of Historic Places
- Location within Louisiana Location within the United States
- Location: Eastern end of Baker High School Campus
- Coordinates: 30°35′15″N 91°09′51″W
- Built: 1959 (67 years ago)
- Architectural style: Modernist
- NRHP reference No.: 13001125
- Added to NRHP: January 29, 2014

Baker High School is an accredited public high school in Baker, Louisiana. It is a part of the City of Baker School System.

== About the school ==
Baker High School was founded in the early 1900s and resides in Baker, a town in north East Baton Rouge Parish. BHS provides an assortment of regular and honors level courses, and College Dual Enrollment opportunities with BRCC.

All 10th through 12th grade students are required to wear uniforms which includes a red polo style shirt with khakis. There is a ninth grade academy in which students are required to wear white uniform shirts.

The school auditorium, a fan-shaped Modernist structure built in 1959, was added to the National Register of Historic Places on January 29, 2014.

== Athletics ==
Baker competes in the LHSAA 3A athletic class and all home sporting events are held on campus (field and gym sports). Current Athletic Director is Eric Randall

The athletic programs include:

- Football
- Boys Basketball
- Girls Basketball
- Volleyball
- Boys and Girls Track & Field
- Baseball
- Softball
- Golf
- Cheerleading
- Dance
- Marching Band

== Marching Band ==
The Symphony Of Soul marching band is Baker High School's marching band. Symphony Of Soul performs at the school's football games as well as at parades.

== Championships ==
Football championships

- (2) State Championships: 1947, 1950

== Notable alumni ==
- Billy Brown, track and field athlete; competed in the triple jump at the 1936 Summer Olympics
- Dexter Dennis, player for the Dallas Mavericks
- Terry Felton, former Major League Baseball (MLB) player (Minnesota Twins)
- Hokie Gajan, former Louisiana State University and National Football League (NFL) running back (New Orleans Saints)
- Don Lemon, journalist and television news anchor, best known as the host of CNN's prime-time weekday show CNN Tonight with Don Lemon
- John Sawyer, former Southern Miss and National Football League (NFL) tight end (Houston Oilers, Seattle Seahawks, Washington Redskins, Denver Broncos)
- Jerald Sowell, former Tulane and NFL full back (New York Jets)
- Linda Thomas-Greenfield, American diplomat who is the United States ambassador to the United Nations
- Lunda Wells, Dallas Cowboys tight ends coach

== See also ==
- National Register of Historic Places listings in East Baton Rouge Parish, Louisiana
