= Jamie Lawson (American football) =

American football player (born 1965)

No. 38, 29
- Position: Fullback

Personal information
- Born: October 2, 1965 (age 61); New Orleans, Louisiana, U.S.
- Listed height: 5 ft 10 in (1.78 m)
- Listed weight: 240 lb (109 kg)

Career information
- High school: Central Lafourche (Raceland, Louisiana)
- College: Nicholls State
- NFL draft: 1989: 5th round, 117th overall pick

Career history
- Tampa Bay Buccaneers (1989–1990); New England Patriots (1990); Tampa Bay Buccaneers (1991)*
- * Offseason or practice squad member only
- Stats at Pro Football Reference

Jamie Lee Lawson (born October 2, 1965) is an American former professional football player who was a fullback in the National Football League (NFL) for the Tampa Bay Buccaneers from 1989 to 1990 and New England Patriots in 1990. He played college football for the Nicholls State Colonels and was selected in the fifth round of the 1989 NFL draft with the 117th overall pick.
