= Darren Gottschalk =

American football player (born 1964)

No. 82
- Position: Tight end

Personal information
- Born: December 1, 1964 (age 61); Merced, California, U.S.
- Listed height: 6 ft 4 in (1.93 m)
- Listed weight: 225 lb (102 kg)

Career information
- High school: South Tahoe (South Lake Tahoe, California)
- College: California Lutheran
- NFL draft: 1987: undrafted

Career history
- New Orleans Saints (1987)
- Stats at Pro Football Reference

Darren K. Gottschalk (born December 1, 1964) is an American former professional football player who was a tight end for the New Orleans Saints of the National Football League (NFL). He played college football for the Cal Lutheran Kingsmen.
