= Jay Pennison =

American football player (born 1961)

No. 57, 52
- Position: Center

Personal information
- Born: September 9, 1961 (age 65); Houma, Louisiana, U.S.
- Listed height: 6 ft 1 in (1.85 m)
- Listed weight: 276 lb (125 kg)

Career information
- High school: South Terrebonne (Bourg, Louisiana)
- College: Nicholls State
- NFL draft: 1984: undrafted

Career history
- Washington Redskins (1984)*; Jacksonville Bulls (1984–1985); Houston Oilers (1986–1990)
- * Offseason or practice squad member only

Career NFL statistics
- Games played: 71
- Games started: 67
- Fumble recoveries: 3
- Stats at Pro Football Reference

Jay Leslie Pennison (born September 9, 1961) is an American former professional football player who was a center in the United States Football League (USFL) and National Football League (NFL). He played college football for the Nicholls Colonels.

== Early life ==
Pennison is a graduate of South Terrebonne High School class of 1979. He walked-on to the Nicholls State University football team as a tight end, but was subsequently moved to center. He had previously played the position in high school during his sophomore and junior seasons. While at Nicholls State, Pennison was named second-team Associated Press All-American during the 1982 and 1983 seasons.

== Professional career ==
Pennison signed as an undrafted free agent with the Washington Redskins in 1984, but was cut late in the preseason. Also in 1984, Pennison was selected in the thirteenth round (270th overall) of the 1984 USFL draft by the Jacksonville Bulls. He played center for the Jacksonville Bulls during the 1984 and 1985 seasons. When the USFL folded in 1986, Pennison was signed by the Houston Oilers and went on to start all 16 games during the 1986 season. Pennison started 5 years on arguably one of the best offensive lines in the 1980s, with Bruce Matthews Hall of Fame Class of 2007, Dean Steinkuhler, Mike Munchak Hall of Fame Class of 2001, Kent Hill 1986–1987, Bruce Davis 1987–1989. The Oilers went to the playoffs 4 out of the 5 years that Pennison was with the team.
