= Kareem Moore =

American football player (born 1984)

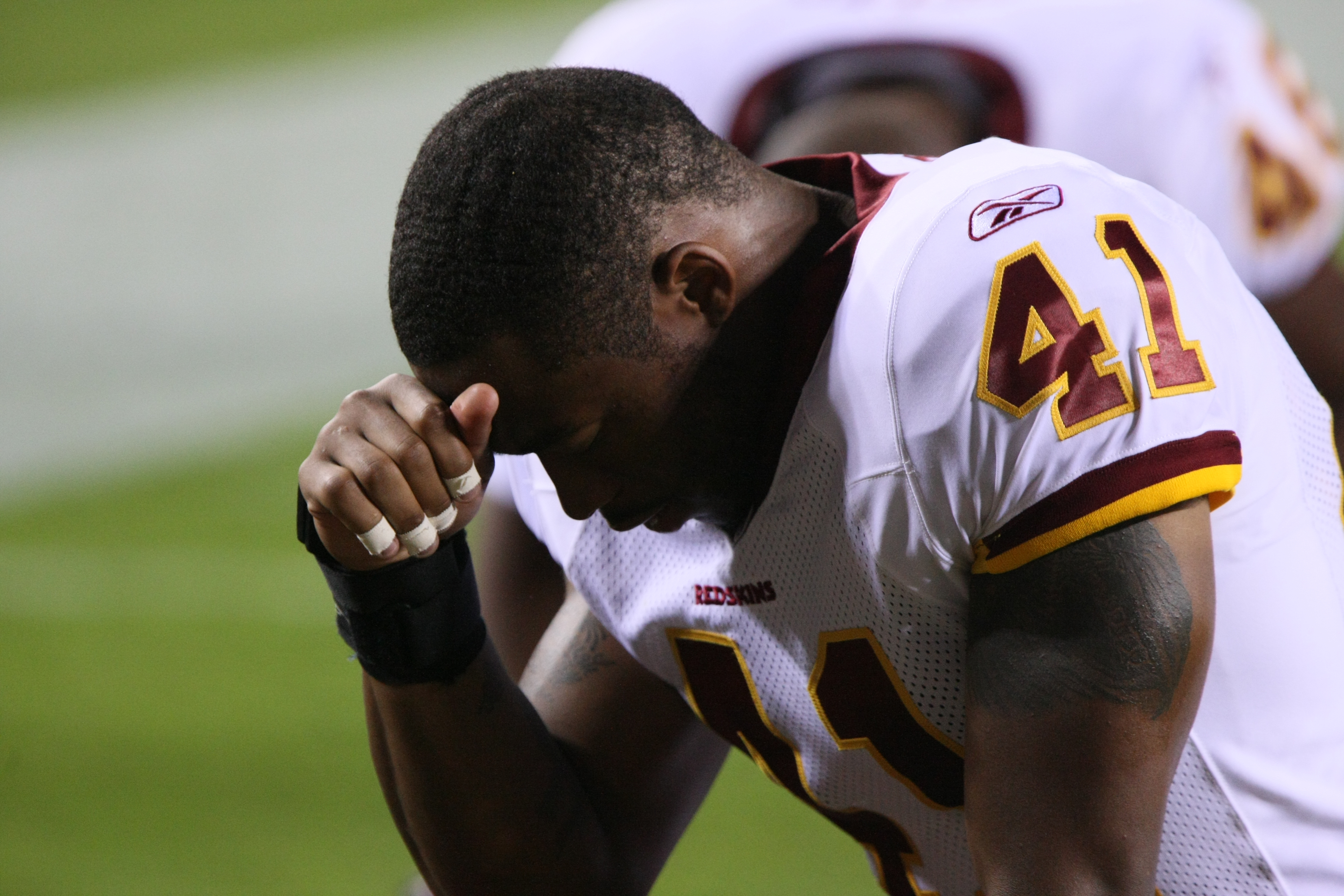
- Moore with the Washington Redskins in 2009

No. 41
- Position: Safety

Personal information
- Born: August 13, 1984 (age 42); Tupelo, Mississippi, U.S.
- Listed height: 5 ft 11 in (1.80 m)
- Listed weight: 213 lb (97 kg)

Career information
- High school: Okolona (Okolona, Mississippi)
- College: Nicholls State
- NFL draft: 2008: 6th round, 180th overall pick

Career history
- Washington Redskins (2008–2011)

Awards and highlights
- Second-team All-American (2008); JUCO All-American (2005); SLC Newcomer of the Year (2006); First-team All-SLC (2007); SLC Defensive Player of the Year (2007)

Career NFL statistics
- Total tackles: 115
- Forced fumbles: 2
- Fumble recoveries: 2
- Pass deflections: 8
- Interceptions: 2
- Stats at Pro Football Reference

Kareem Moore (born August 13, 1984) is an American former professional football player who was a safety in the National Football League (NFL). He was selected by the Washington Redskins in the sixth round of the 2008 NFL draft. He played college football for the Nicholls State Colonels, where he was named second-team Associated Press All-American and SLC Newcomer of the Year. Prior to Nicholls State, Moore played at Itawamba Community College, where he earned JUCO All-American honors and Ole Miss.

== Professional career ==
=== Washington Redskins ===
The Washington Redskins selected Moore in the sixth round of the 2008 NFL draft. He made his NFL debut in Week 3 against the Arizona Cardinals. Moore would then have his first career start in the last game in the 2008 season against the San Francisco 49ers. He played in 14 games, starting one of them, and recorded 17 combined tackles.

Moore had his first interception in Week 13 of the 2009 season against the New Orleans Saints, but Robert Meachem tore the ball out of his grasp and ran it for a touchdown. At the end of the season, he played in all 16 games, starting one of them, and recorded 34 combined tackles, three pass break-ups, one interception, and two forced fumbles.

In the 2010 season, Moore became the team's starting free safety. His first season as regular starter was cut short after he was placed on injured reserve on December 29, 2010, due to a knee injury.

At the start of the 2011 season, Moore was placed on the physically unable to perform list, which meant he would miss the first six games of the season. On November 15, 2011, he was released from the team.

== NFL career statistics ==
Legend
**Bold**	Career high

Year	Team	Games		Tackles					Interceptions					Fumbles			
Year	Team	GP	GS	Cmb	Solo	Ast	Sck	TFL	Int	Yds	TD	Lng	PD	FF	FR	Yds	TD
2008	WAS	14	1	17	11	6	0.0	0	0	0	0	0	0	0	0	0	0
2009	WAS	16	1	34	26	8	0.0	0	**1**	**14**	0	**14**	3	**2**	0	0	0
2010	WAS	12	11	**64**	**40**	**24**	0.0	0	**1**	5	0	5	**5**	0	**2**	**13**	0
		42	13	115	77	38	0.0	0	2	19	0	14	8	2	2	13	0
