= Gerald Butler (American football) =

American football player (born 1954)

Profile
- Position: Wide receiver

Personal information
- Born: June 5, 1954 (age 72); New Orleans, Louisiana, U.S.

Career information
- College: Nicholls State
- NFL draft: 1977: 7th round, 182nd overall pick

Career history
- 1977: Kansas City Chiefs

Gerald Butler (born June 5, 1954) is an American former professional football player who was a wide receiver for the Kansas City Chiefs of the National Football League. He played college football for the Nicholls State Colonels and was named first-team Kodak All-American by the American Football Coaches Association (AFCA) in 1976. He was selected in the seventh round of the 1977 NFL draft by the Chicago Bears and played the 1977 season with the Kansas City Chiefs.
