= Oscar Smith (American football) =

American football player (born 1963)

No. 25
- Position: Running back

Personal information
- Born: April 5, 1963 (age 63); Tampa, Florida, U.S.
- Listed height: 5 ft 9 in (1.75 m)
- Listed weight: 203 lb (92 kg)

Career information
- High school: Jefferson (Tampa)
- College: Nicholls State
- NFL draft: 1986: 5th round, 119th overall pick

Career history
- Detroit Lions (1986)

Career NFL statistics
- Return yards: 81
- Stats at Pro Football Reference

Oscar Smith (born April 5, 1963) is an American former professional football player who was a running back for the Detroit Lions of the National Football League (NFL).

He played college football for the Nicholls State Colonels and was selected in the fifth round of the 1986 NFL draft with the 119th overall pick. He played for the Lions during the 1986 season.
