= Rusty Rebowe =

American gridiron football player (born 1956)

No. 56
- Position: Linebacker

Personal information
- Born: January 17, 1956 (age 70); Destrehan, Louisiana, U.S.
- Listed height: 5 ft 10 in (1.78 m)
- Listed weight: 213 lb (97 kg)

Career information
- High school: Destrehan
- College: Nicholls State
- NFL draft: 1978: undrafted

Career history
- New Orleans Saints (1978); Hamilton Tiger-Cats (1979)

Career NFL statistics
- Tackles: 0
- Sacks: 0
- Interceptions: 0
- Forced fumbles: 0
- Stats at Pro Football Reference

Rusty Rebowe (born January 17, 1956) is an American former professional football player who was a linebacker in the National Football League (NFL) for the New Orleans Saints and in the Canadian Football League (CFL) with the Hamilton Tiger-Cats. He played college football for the Nicholls State Colonels.

== Playing career ==
=== High school career ===
Rebowe from Norco, Louisiana played high school football at Destrehan High School where he was named Class 3A state defensive most valuable player in 1973. His team won the 1973 LHSAA 3A state championship.

=== College career ===
Rebowe played college football for the Nicholls State Colonels. In his junior year in 1976, he was named second-team All-Gulf South Conference and during his senior year in 1977, he was named player of the year in the Gulf South Conference and was a consensus first-team Associated Press All-American, first-team Kodak All-American by the American Football Coaches Association (AFCA) and first-team NCAA All-American. He finished his career as the all-time leading tackler in school history with 655 total tackles (solo and assists), all-time leader in solo tackles with 412, all-time leader for tackles in a season with 239 and tackles in a game with 23.

=== Professional career ===
Rebowe was a free agent selection of the New Orleans Saints in 1978 and played for the team during the 1978 season. In 1979, he was a member of the Hamilton Tiger-Cats in the Canadian Football League.

== Personal life ==
Rebowe's brother, Tim Rebowe, is the current head coach at Nicholls State.
