= Darryl Pounds =

American football player (born 1972)

No. 31
- Position: Cornerback

Personal information
- Born: July 21, 1972 (age 54); Fort Worth, Texas, U.S.
- Listed height: 5 ft 10 in (1.78 m)
- Listed weight: 189 lb (86 kg)

Career information
- High school: South Pike (Magnolia, Mississippi)
- College: Nicholls State
- NFL draft: 1995: 3rd round, 68th overall pick

Career history
- Washington Redskins (1995–1999); Denver Broncos (2000)

Career NFL statistics
- Tackles: 120
- Sacks: 3.5
- Passes defended: 4
- Interceptions: 9
- Stats at Pro Football Reference

Darryl Lamont Pounds (born July 21, 1972) is an American former professional football player who was a cornerback in the National Football League (NFL) for the Washington Redskins and the Denver Broncos. He played college football for the Nicholls State Colonels where he was named second-team Associated Press All-American in 1991 and first-team Associated Press All-American in 1994. He was selected in the third round of the 1995 NFL draft by the Washington Redskins. Pounds played high school football at South Pike High School in Magnolia, Mississippi.

Following his retirement from the NFL, Pounds became a realtor and later founded a construction company in the Washington metropolitan area.

== NFL career statistics ==
Legend
**Bold**	Career high

=== Regular season ===
Year	Team	Games		Tackles					Interceptions					Fumbles			
Year	Team	GP	GS	Cmb	Solo	Ast	Sck	TFL	Int	Yds	TD	Lng	PD	FF	FR	Yds	TD
1995	WAS	9	0	4	3	1	0.0	-	1	26	0	**26**	-	0	0	0	0
1996	WAS	12	1	16	16	0	0.0	-	2	11	0	11	-	1	1	0	0
1997	WAS	**16**	0	30	29	1	**2.0**	-	**3**	**42**	**1**	22	-	1	**3**	**18**	**1**
1998	WAS	**16**	**3**	**46**	**41**	**5**	0.5	-	0	0	0	0	-	0	1	0	0
1999	WAS	**16**	0	17	17	0	1.0	0	**3**	37	0	25	**4**	**2**	1	2	0
2000	DEN	9	0	7	6	1	0.0	0	0	0	0	0	0	0	0	0	0
		78	4	120	112	8	3.5	0	9	116	1	26	4	4	6	20	1

=== Playoffs ===
Year	Team	Games		Tackles					Interceptions					Fumbles			
Year	Team	GP	GS	Cmb	Solo	Ast	Sck	TFL	Int	Yds	TD	Lng	PD	FF	FR	Yds	TD
1999	WAS	**2**	0	**2**	**2**	0	0.0	0	0	0	0	0	-	**1**	0	0	0
		2	0	2	2	0	0.0	0	0	0	0	0	-	1	0	0	0
