= Dwight Walker =

American football player (born 1959)

No. 42, 89, 83
- Positions: Running back, wide receiver

Personal information
- Born: January 10, 1959 (age 67); Metairie, Louisiana, U.S.
- Listed height: 5 ft 10 in (1.78 m)
- Listed weight: 185 lb (84 kg)

Career information
- High school: East Jefferson (Metairie)
- College: Nicholls State
- NFL draft: 1982: 4th round, 87th overall pick

Career history
- Cleveland Browns (1982–1984); New Orleans Saints (1987)

Career NFL statistics
- Receptions: 49
- Receiving yards: 546
- Touchdowns: 1
- Stats at Pro Football Reference

Dwight Gerard Walker (born January 10, 1959) is an American former professional football player for the Cleveland Browns and New Orleans Saints of the National Football League (NFL).

Walker played three years as a running back for the Browns from 1982 to 1984. He was forced to retire due to injuries sustained in a car accident. His best season with the Browns was in 1983. In 1987, Walker resumed his career with the Saints and played wide receiver before retiring again following the season.

Walker played college football for the Nicholls State Colonels and was named first-team Associated Press All-American and first-team Kodak All-American by the American Football Coaches Association (AFCA) in 1981. He attended East Jefferson High School in Metairie, Louisiana.
