= Nicholls Colonels football =

American college football team

2026 Nicholls Colonels football team
- First season: 1972; 54 years ago
- Head coach: Tommy Rybacki; 1st season, 4–8 (.333)
- Location: Thibodaux, Louisiana
- Stadium: Manning Field at John L. Guidry Stadium (capacity: 10,500)
- NCAA division: Division I FCS
- Conference: Southland
- Colors: Red and gray
- All-time record: 231–317–4 (.422)

Conference championships
- Gulf South: 1975 Gulf Star: 1984 SLC: 2005, 2018, 2019, 2023
- Consensus All-Americans: 15
- Rivalries: Southeastern Louisiana (rivalry); Northwestern State (rivalry); Texas State (rivalry)
- Fight song: Nicholls State Colonels Fight Song
- Mascot: Colonel Tillou
- Marching band: Pride of Nicholls Marching Band
- Website: GeauxColonels.com

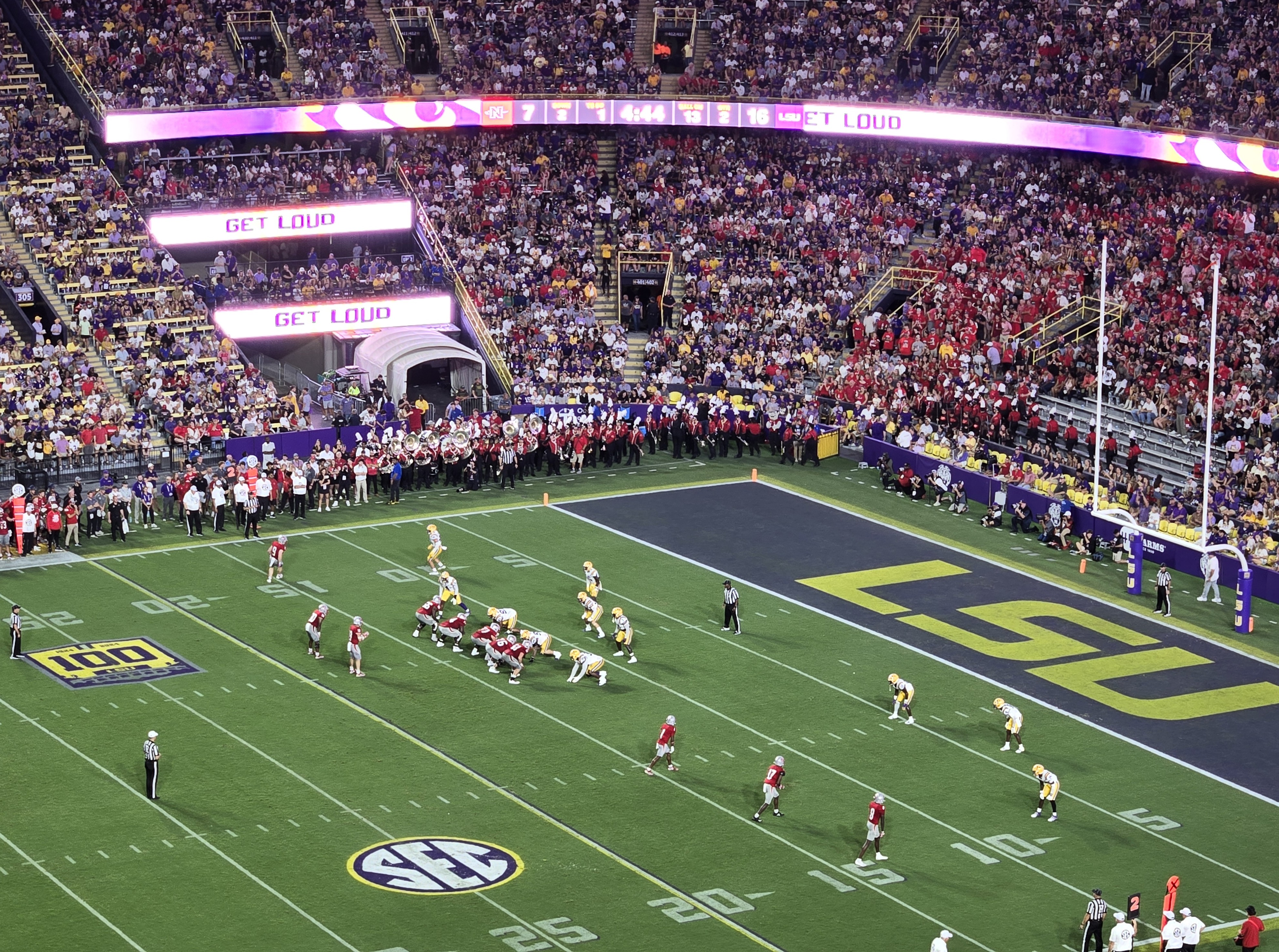
Nicholls Colonels Football driving in the red zone vs. LSU

The Nicholls Colonels football program is the intercollegiate American football team for Nicholls State University located in Thibodaux, Louisiana, United States. The team competes in the NCAA Division I Football Championship Subdivision (FCS) and are members of the Southland Conference. Nicholls' first football team was fielded in 1972. The team plays its home games at the 10,500 seat Manning Field at John L. Guidry Stadium in Thibodaux, Louisiana. The Colonels are coached by Tommy Rybacki.

== History ==
Source:

== Conference affiliations ==
Years	Conference	Classification
1972	Gulf South Conference	NCAA College Division
1973–1978	Gulf South Conference	Division II
1979	Independent	Division II
1980–1983	Independent	Division I-AA
1984–1986	Gulf Star Conference	Division I-AA
1987–1990	Independent	Division I-AA
1991–2005	Southland Conference	Division I-AA
2006–present	Southland Conference	Division I Football Championship Subdivision (FCS)

== Championships ==
=== Conference championships ===
- 1975 Gulf South Conference Champions (Division II)
  Head Coach: Bill Clements
  Overall Record (8–2)
  Conference Record (7–2)
- 1984 Gulf Star Conference Champions (Division I-AA)
  Head Coach: Sonny Jackson
  Overall Record (6–5)
  Gulf Star Conference Record (4–1)
- 2005 Southland Conference Champions (Division I-AA)
  Head Coach: Jay Thomas
  Overall Record (6–5)
  Southland Conference Record (5–1)
- 2018 Southland Conference Champions (Football Championship Subdivision)
  Head Coach: Tim Rebowe
  Overall Record (8–3)
  Southland Conference Record (7–2)
- 2019 Southland Conference Champions (Football Championship Subdivision)
  Head Coach: Tim Rebowe
  Overall Record (8–4)
  Southland Conference Record (7–2)
- 2023 Southland Conference Champions (Football Championship Subdivision)
  Head Coach: Tim Rebowe
  Overall Record (6–4)
  Southland Conference Record (7–0)

== Head coaches ==
Years	Name	Won	Lost	Tie	Pct.
1972–1973	Gary Kinchen	5	17	0	.227
1974–1980	Bill Clements	36	39	1	.480
1981–1986	Sonny Jackson	39	28	1	.581
1987–1992	Phil Greco	27	37	2	.424
1993–1994	Rick Rhoades	8	14	0	.364
1995–1998*	Darren Barbier	17	28	0	.378
1999–2003	Daryl Daye	13	42	0	.236
2004–2009	Jay Thomas	27	35	0	.435
2010–2014	Charlie Stubbs	10	38	0	.208
2014**	Steve Axman	0	9	0	.000
2015–2024	Tim Rebowe	53	48	0	.525
2025-present	Tommy Rybacki	1	0	0	1.000

*1996 I-AA National Coach of the Year, Eddie Robinson Award Recipient
**Interim head coach for final nine games of 2014 season

== Division I-AA/Division I FCS Playoffs ==
The Colonels have qualified for the Division I-AA/FCS playoffs seven times, with a combined record of 3–7.

Year	Round	Classification	Opponent	Result	Game Name
1986	First Round; Quarterfinals	NCAA Division I-AA Playoffs	Appalachian State; Georgia Southern	W 28–26; L 31–55	(Grantland Rice Bowl)
1996	First Round	NCAA Division I-AA Playoffs	Montana	L 3–48
2005	First Round	NCAA Division I-AA Playoffs	Furman	L 12–14
2017	First Round	NCAA Division I FCS Playoffs	South Dakota	L 31–38
2018	First Round; Second Round	NCAA Division I FCS Playoffs	San Diego; Eastern Washington	W 49–30; L 21–42
2019	First Round; Second Round	NCAA Division I FCS Playoffs	North Dakota; North Dakota State	W 24–6; L 13–37
2023	First Round	NCAA Division I FCS Playoffs	Southern Illinois	L 0–35

== Notable players ==
=== All-Americans ===
Year	Name	Position	Team
1976	Gerald Butler	WR	Kodak First Team (AFCA)
1977	Rusty Rebowe	LB	AP First Team; Kodak First Team (AFCA); NCAA All-American
1981	Dwight Walker	WR	AP First Team; Kodak First Team (AFCA)
1982	Clint Conque	LB	AP First Team
1982	Jay Pennison	OL	AP Second Team
1983	Jay Pennison	OL	AP Second Team
1984	Dewayne Harrison	TE	AP First Team
1985	Lynn Bychurch	OL	AP Second Team
1986	Mark Carrier	WR	AP First Team; Kodak First Team (AFCA)
1987	Alfred Dorsey	WR	AP Second Team
1987	Karl Hill	DB	AP Third Team
1987	Reed Pere’	OL	AP Third Team
1991	Darryl Pounds	DB	AP Second Team
1994	Brian Desselles	P	AP Second Team
1994	Darryl Pounds	DB	AP First Team
2007	Kareem Moore	DB	AP Second Team
2007	Lardarius Webb	DB	Walter Camp Foundation First Team
2008	Lardarius Webb	DB	AP First Team

=== Nicholls Colonels selected in the NFL draft ===
Year	Name	Position	Team	Round	Overall pick
1976	Gary Barbaro	DB	Kansas City Chiefs	3rd Round	74th
1977	Gerald Butler	WR	Chicago Bears	7th Round	182nd
1982	Dwight Walker	WR	Cleveland Browns	4th Round	87th
1984	Johnny Meads	LB	Houston Oilers	3rd Round	58th
1985	Anthony Tuggle	DB	Cincinnati Bengals	4th Round	97th
1985	Lionel Vital	RB	Washington Redskins	7th Round	187th
1986	Oscar Smith	RB	Detroit Lions	5th Round	119th
1987	Mark Carrier	WR	Tampa Bay Buccaneers	3rd Round	57th
1987	Doug Hudson	QB	Kansas City Chiefs	6th Round	186th
1989	Jamie Lawson	FB	Tampa Bay Buccaneers	5th Round	117th
1990	Dee Thomas	DB	Houston Oilers	10th Round	264th
1995	Darryl Pounds	DB	Washington Redskins	3rd Round	68th
2004	Chris Thompson	DB	Jacksonville Jaguars	5th Round	110th
2007	Jacob Bender	OL	New York Jets	6th Round	177th
2008	Kareem Moore	DB	Washington Redskins	6th Round	180th
2009	Lardarius Webb	DB	Baltimore Ravens	3rd Round	88th

== Stadium ==
=== Manning Field at John L. Guidry Stadium ===
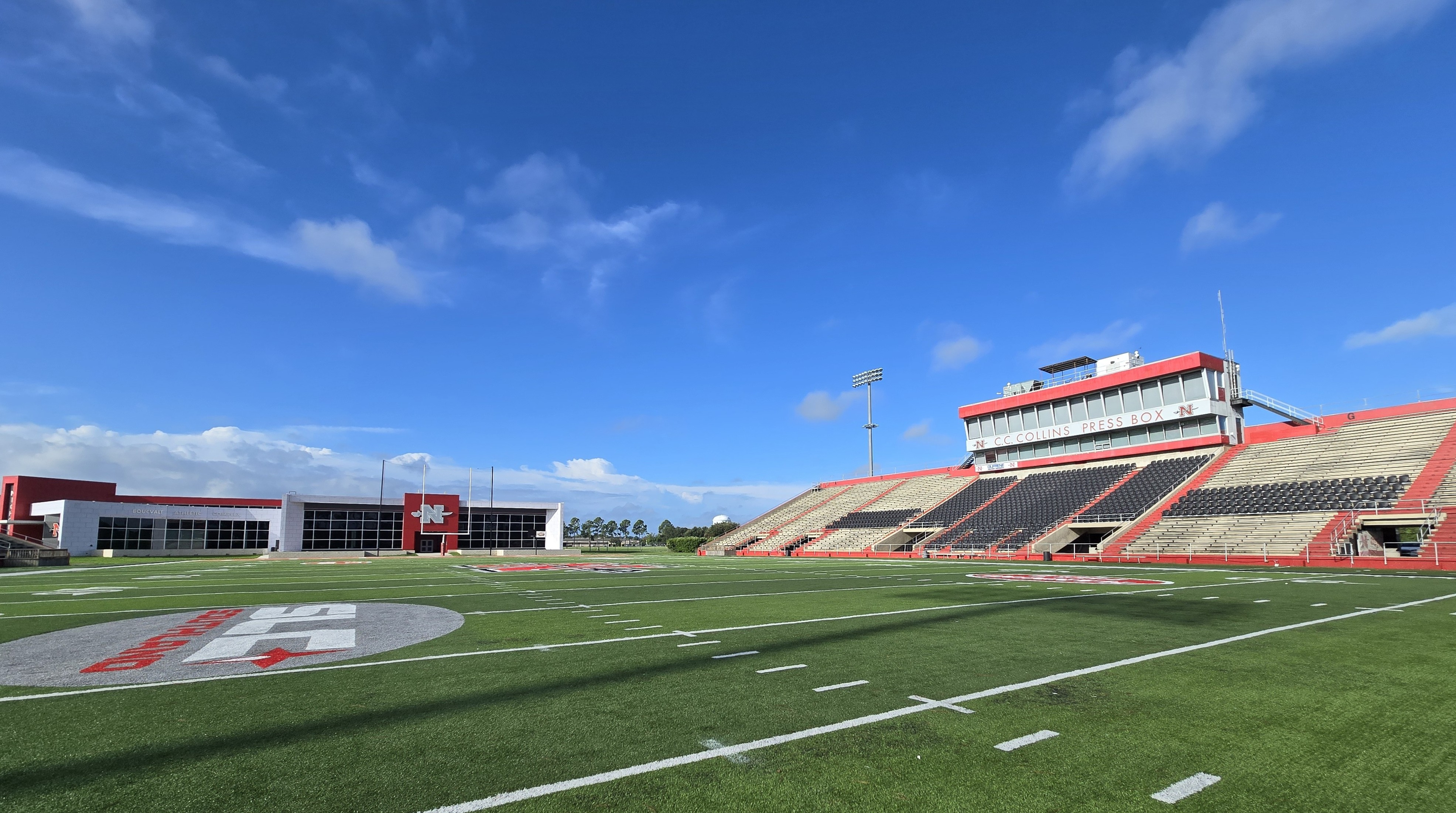
Manning Field at John L. Guidry Stadium

Manning Field at John L. Guidry Stadium is a 10,500-seat multi-purpose stadium in Thibodaux, Louisiana. It is home to the Nicholls Colonels football team of the Southland Conference in the Football Championship Subdivision (FCS). The stadium is named in honor of former state representative John L. Guidry. The playing surface is named Manning Field after the Manning family (Peyton, Eli, Cooper and Archie) because the family holds the annual Manning Passing Academy football camp at the facility. The current playing surface is GeoGreen Replicated Grass.

On June 12, 2019, Nicholls announced a new $6.5 million, 20,000-square-foot football operations center will be built in the south end zone along with an expansion and renovation of the Frank L. Barker Athletic Building. The football team moved from the Barker Athletic Building to the Boucvault Athletic Complex for the start of the 2020 Nicholls Football season.

== Practice and training facilities ==
=== Boucvault Athletic Complex ===
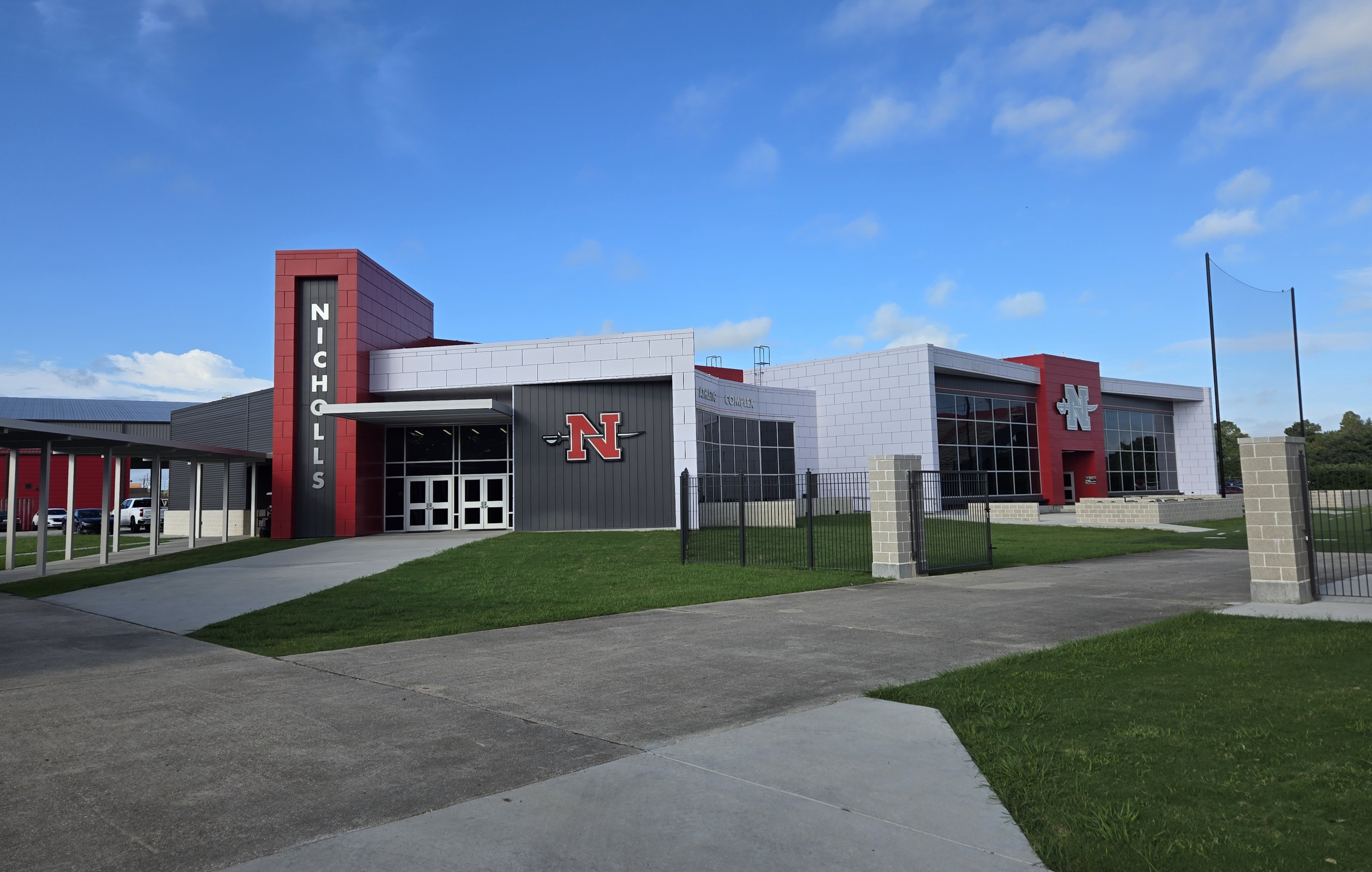
Boucvault Athletic Complex

The Boucvault Athletic Complex is located at the south end zone of Manning Field at John L. Guidry Stadium. The facility includes football offices, team locker rooms, training rooms, and a team meeting hall with a seating area for fans overlooking the field.

=== Gaubert Oil Practice Facility at Shaw Sports Turf/Manning Field ===
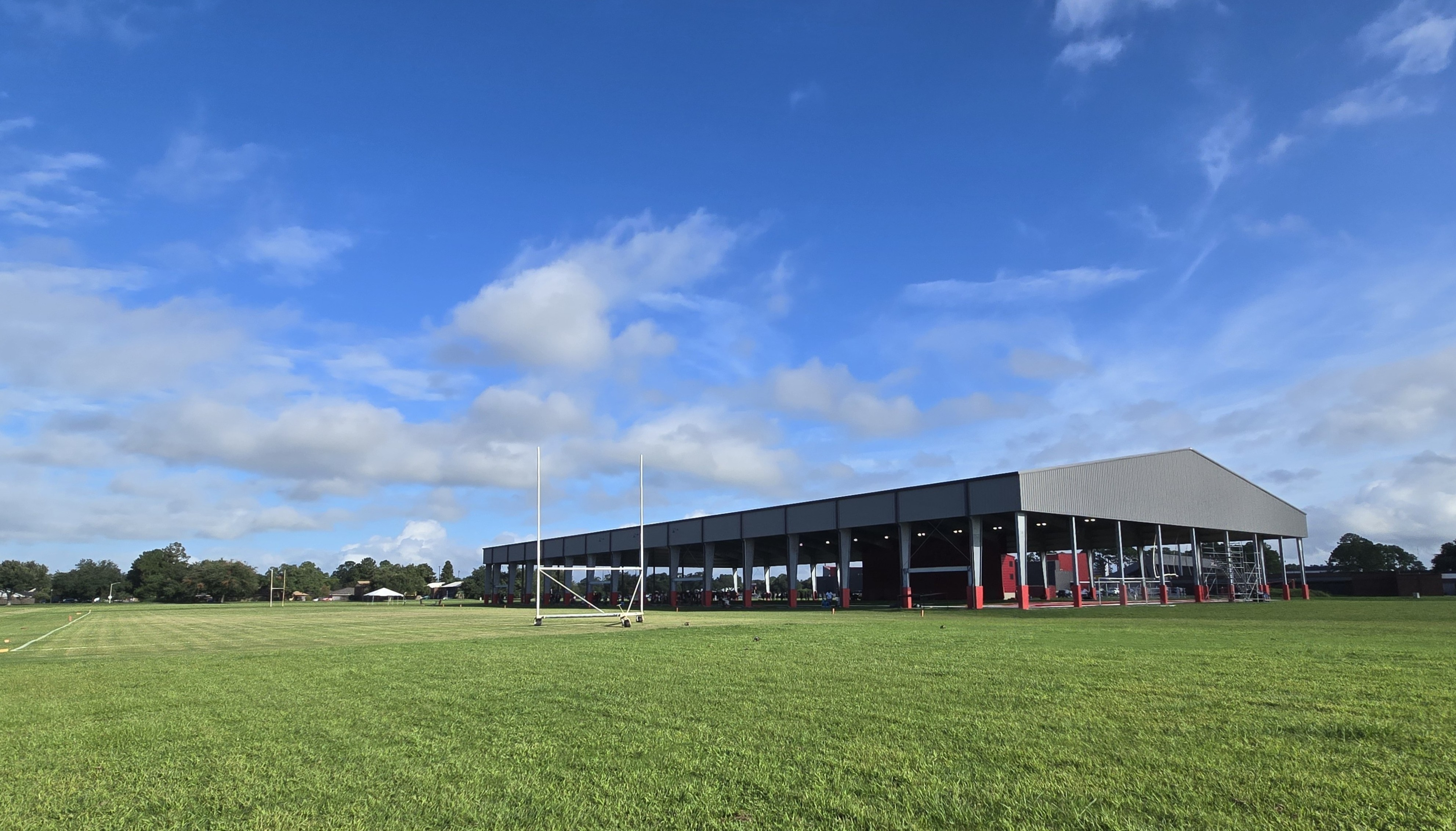
Gaubert Oil at Shaw Sports Turf/Manning Field

The Gaubert Oil Practice Facility at Shaw Sports Turf/Manning Field is a covered 100-yard turf field and also includes office and storage space for the team. It is located directly behind the Boucvault Athletic Complex and Manning Field at John L. Guidry Stadium. In a partnership between Nicholls Colonels football, the Manning Passing Academy and Shaw Sports Turf, an artificial turf field was installed at the facility.

=== Leonard C. Chabert Strength and Conditioning Facility ===
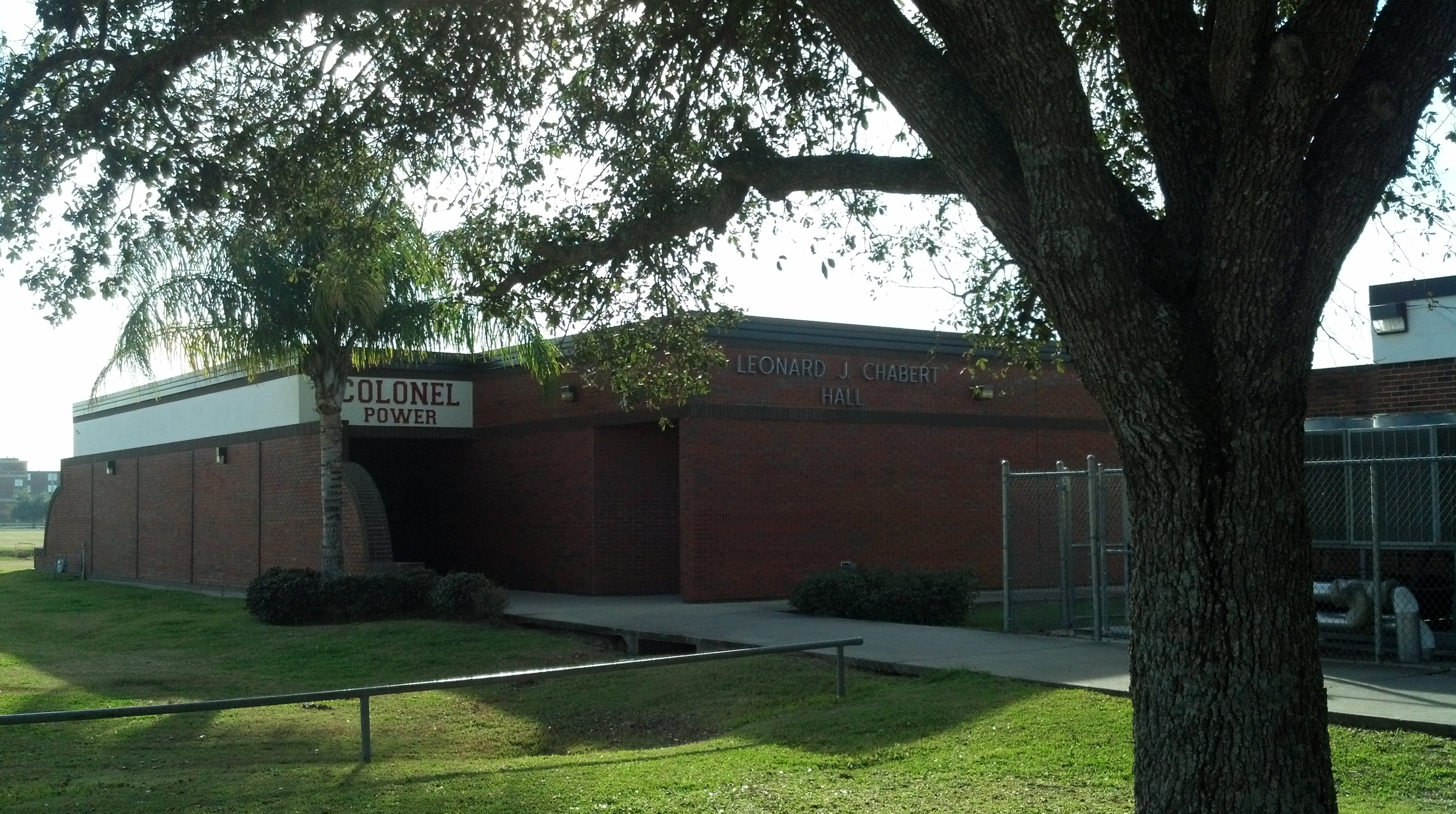
Chabert S&C Facility

The Nicholls Colonels Strength and Conditioning facility is located in the Leonard C. Chabert Strength and Conditioning Facility or Leonard C. Chabert Hall. The facility has multi-purpose power stations, weight machines, dumbbell stations, elliptical machines and stationary bikes. It is the strength and conditioning facility and nutrition center for Nicholls athletics.

== Historic football facilities ==
=== Frank L. Barker Athletic Building ===
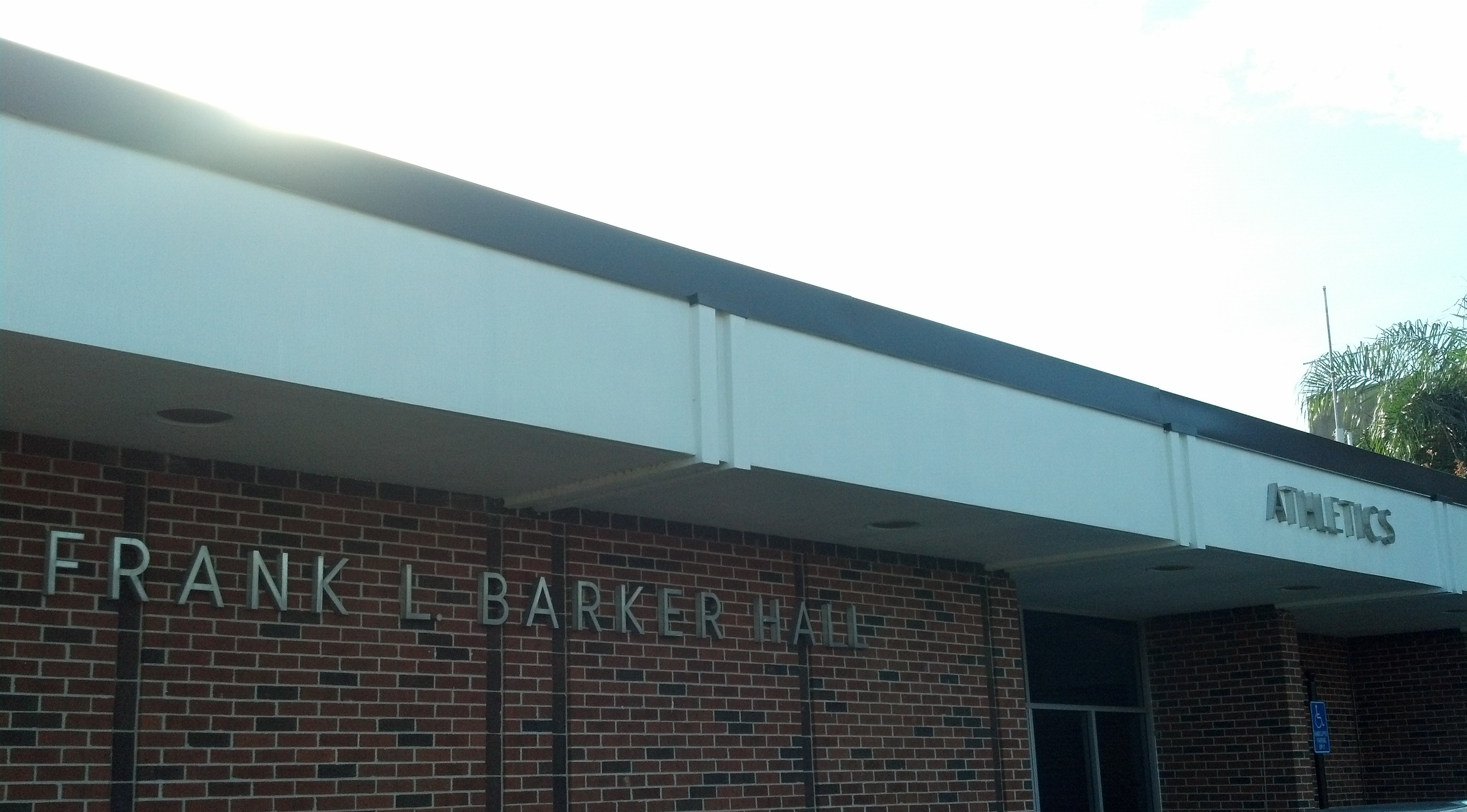
Barker Athletic Building

The Frank L. Barker Athletic Building or Barker Hall is located adjacent to Manning Field at John L. Guidry Stadium. From 1972 to 2019, it housed the Nicholls Colonels football coaches’ offices, locker rooms, meeting rooms, athletic training rooms and athletic staff. The Nicholls Athletics Hall of Fame is also located in the building.

=== Original football practice fields ===
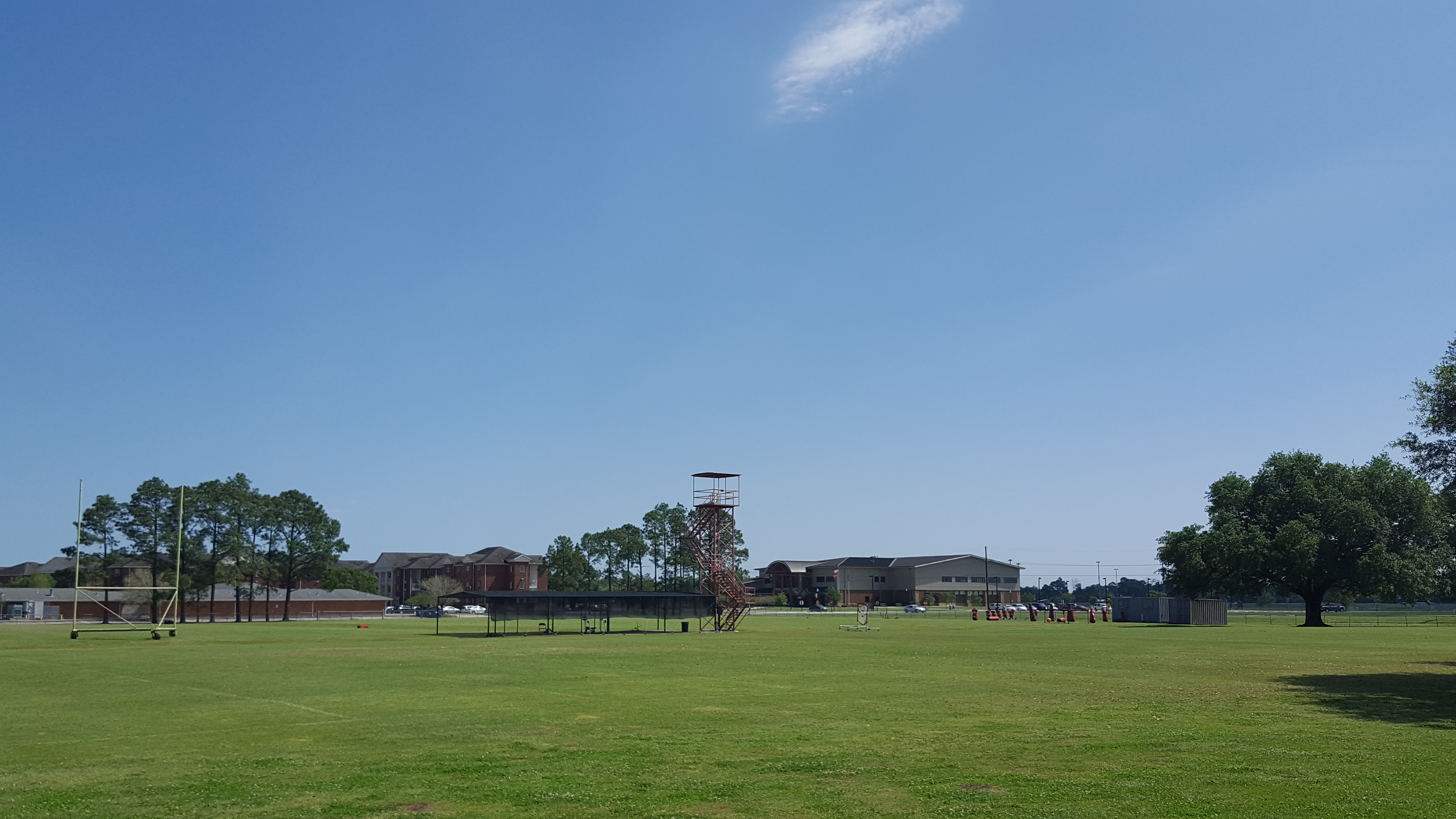
Original football practice fields

The original Nicholls Colonels football practice fields were the teams practice fields from 1972 to 2023. It included three natural grass football practice fields and was located across Acadia Drive from Manning Field at John L. Guidry Stadium, the Frank L. Barker Athletic Building and the Leonard C. Chabert Strength and Conditioning Facility. Two of the fields faced in a north–south configuration similar to Manning Field at John L. Guidry Stadium with a third that faced in an east–west configuration.

== Rivalries ==
=== Southeastern Louisiana ===
Nicholls and Southeastern Louisiana are located 94 miles apart and no two football-playing schools in the Southland Conference are as close as the two schools. The winner of the annual football game is awarded the River Bell Trophy. The trophy features a river bell, the teams athletic logos and details the yearly victors. The game played between the rivals began in 1972 and was played annually until 1985 when Southeastern Louisiana dropped its football program. It resumed 20 years later in 2005 when football was reinstated by the university.

=== Northwestern State ===
The football rivalry game with Northwestern State is played annually with the winner being awarded the NSU Trophy. Both universities are located in Louisiana and are members of the Southland Conference. The first game in the series was played in 1973.

=== Texas State ===
In fall 1998, the Colonels were scheduled to take on the Texas State Bobcats. Prior to the game, heavy rains flooded San Marcos, Texas and the playing field at Texas State. Athletic directors and coaches from both schools decided to postpone the game and coined the annual contest the "Battle for the Paddle," joking that fans and athletes needed to use a boat and paddle to get to the game. The game was eventually played on November 28, 1998, with Texas State prevailing 28–27 to win the first "Battle for the Paddle". A wooden oar or paddle named the "Paddle Trophy" was awarded to the winner of the contest.

== Future non-conference opponents ==
Announced non-conference opponents as of February 6, 2026.

2026	2027
Mississippi Valley State	at Louisiana Tech
at Kansas State	Southern
at Sam Houston	at Tulane

== Media ==
The Colonels are broadcast on ESPN+.

== See also ==
- List of NCAA Division I FCS football programs
- Nicholls Colonels
