= Baker, Louisiana =

- City
- City of Baker
- Location of Baker in East Baton Rouge Parish, Louisiana

- Location of Louisiana in the United States Baker (the United States)
- Coordinates: 30°35′08″N 91°09′26″W
- Country: United States
- State: Louisiana
- Parish: East Baton Rouge

Government
  - Mayor: Darnell Waites (D) (elected April 10, 2016)

Area
  - Total: 8.40 sq mi (21.75 km^{2})
  - Land: 8.40 sq mi (21.75 km^{2})
  - Water: 0 sq mi (0.00 km^{2})

Population (2020)
  - Total: 12,455
  - Density: 1,482.8/sq mi (572.53/km^{2})
- Time zone: UTC-6 (CST)
  - Summer (DST): UTC-5 (CDT)
- ZIP code: 70714
- Area code: 225
- FIPS code: 22-03985
- Website: cityofbakerla.com

Baker is a city in the U.S. state of Louisiana, in East Baton Rouge Parish. It is part of the Baton Rouge metropolitan statistical area, and had a population of 12,455 at the 2020 census, down from 13,895 at the 2010 U.S. census.

== History ==
Baker was originally known as Cottonville, as it was the site of a major cotton plantation. It was renamed in 1888 for Josephus Smith Baker, a prominent settler who owned the Baker Plantation.

== Geography ==
Baker is located north of the center of East Baton Rouge Parish at 30°35′8″N 91°9′26″W (30.585637, -91.157096). It is bordered to the north by Zachary and to the south by Baton Rouge. According to the United States Census Bureau, Baker has a total area of 8.3 square miles (21.5 km^{2}), all land.

Louisiana Highway 19 runs through the center of Baker, leading north 4 miles (6 km) to the center of Zachary and south 5 miles (8 km) to U.S. Route 61 in the northern part of Baton Rouge. Downtown Baton Rouge is 11 miles (18 km) south of Baker. Louisiana Highway 67 passes through the eastern part of Baker, leading north 22 miles (35 km) to Clinton and south 9 miles (14 km) into the center of Baton Rouge.

== Demographics ==
Historical population
Census	Pop.	Note	%±
1950	762		—
1960	4,823		532.9%
1970	8,281		71.7%
1980	12,865		55.4%
1990	13,233		2.9%
2000	13,793		4.2%
2010	13,895		0.7%
2020	12,455		−10.4%
2025 (est.)	12,136	▼	−2.6%
U.S. Decennial Census

=== 2020 census ===
Baker city, Louisiana – Racial and ethnic composition Note: the US Census treats Hispanic/Latino as an ethnic category. This table excludes Latinos from the racial categories and assigns them to a separate category. Hispanics/Latinos may be of any race.
Race / Ethnicity (NH = Non-Hispanic)	Pop 2000	Pop 2010	Pop 2020	% 2000	% 2010	% 2020
White alone (NH)	6,284	2,781	1,672	45.56%	20.01%%	13.42%
Black or African American alone (NH)	7,196	10,712	10,212	52.17%	77.09%	81.99%
Native American or Alaska Native alone (NH)	39	44	10	0.28%	0.32%	0.08%
Asian alone (NH)	31	24	24	0.22%	0.17%	0.19%
Native Hawaiian or Pacific Islander alone (NH)	1	0	1	0.01%	0.00%	0.01%
Other race alone (NH)	8	17	37	0.06%	0.12%	0.30%
Mixed race or Multiracial (NH)	115	146	207	0.83%	1.05%	1.66%
Hispanic or Latino (any race)	119	171	292	0.86%	1.23%	2.34%
Total	13,793	13,895	12,455	100.00%	100.00%	100.00%

At the 2019 American Community Survey, there were 13,437 people, 4,693 households, and 3,097 families residing in the city. As of 2010, the population density was 1,674.3 people per square mile. In 2019, there were 5,276 housing units. According to the 2020 United States census, there were 12,455 people, 4,693 households, and 3,097 families residing in the city.

The racial and ethnic makeup of the city was 84.6% Black and African American, 13.6% non-Hispanic white, 0.1% American Indian or Alaska Native, 0.3% Asian, 0.4% Native Hawaiian and other Pacific Islander, 0.1% some other race, 0.4% two or more races, and 0.5% Hispanic and Latin American of any race. At the 2000 United States census, the racial makeup of the city was 45.97% White, 52.36% African American, 0.28% Native American, 0.22% Asian, 0.01% Pacific Islander, 0.17% from other races, and 0.99% from two or more races; Hispanic or Latin American people of any race were 0.86% of the population.

Of the 4,693 households in 2019, there were 88 males per 100 females, and the median age was 34.8 years. The average household size was 2.83, and the average family size was 3.63. An estimated 30.2% of households had one or more people under 18 years of age, and 34.7% with one or more people aged 65 and older; 28.8% of householders lived alone. There was an ownership rate of 67.4%, and 32.6% had renter-occupied housing units. The median household income was $53,082 and males had a median income of $40,926 versus $30,872 for females. Approximately 12.9% of the population lived at or below the poverty line.

Baker received an influx of New Orleans residents during the immediate aftermath of Hurricanes Katrina and Rita. Renaissance Village (established by the Federal Emergency Management Agency) was the home to more than 3,000 evacuees, of whom more than 500 were school-age children. The large majority of the residents came from the poorest parts of New Orleans.

== Government and infrastructure ==
The United States Postal Service operates the Baker Post Office.

The Jetson Center for Youth, a former juvenile prison operated by the Louisiana Office of Juvenile Justice, is located near Baker in an unincorporated area.

== Baker Buffalo Festival ==
The Baker Buffalo Festival is held every year on the last full weekend in September. The festival was started in 1993 as a fundraiser for the schools in Baker. The schools and their organizations use the festival to raise money for their activities. The Festival Committee also makes donations to all the schools that participate. The event includes a festival, parade, Queen's pageant, and car show.

== Education ==
Baker residents are zoned to the City of Baker School System. Baker High School is the city's high school.

Unincorporated areas with Baker addresses are within the East Baton Rouge Parish School System.

East Baton Rouge Parish Library operates the Baker Branch, located across from Baker High School. The library opened in Miss Angie Williams' Tea Room on June 19, 1941 and subsequently moved to a school building in 1955, a third building, and then the Baker Masonic Lodge on July 20, 1959. The current library, with 17,900 square feet (1,660 m^{2}) of space, opened in April 2001; it was designed by Cockfield-Jackson Architects.

== National Guard ==
Baker is home to the 926th MAC (mobility augmentation company) which is part of the 769th Engineer Battalion (combat) headquartered in Baton Rouge. These units belong to the 225th Engineer Brigade which is headquartered at Pineville on Louisiana National Guard Training Center Pineville. As of 2011 this unit has been activated for overseas deployment to a combat theater.

== Notable people ==
- Barbara West Carpenter, dean of international relations at Southern University; District 63 state representative for East Baton Rouge Parish; resides in Baker
- Don Lemon, author and journalist; graduated from Baker High School
- Tony Perkins, politician and Republican former Louisiana State Representative; resided in Baker until he relocated to Washington, D.C., to head the Family Research Council
- Linda Thomas-Greenfield, United States Ambassador to the United Nations (2021–) and former Assistant Secretary of State for African Affairs (2013–2017); born in Baker
- Robert Tinney, Contemporary illustrator

== See also ==
- WBRP
