= 2020 Southeastern Louisiana Lions football team =

American college football season

2020 Southeastern Louisiana Lions football
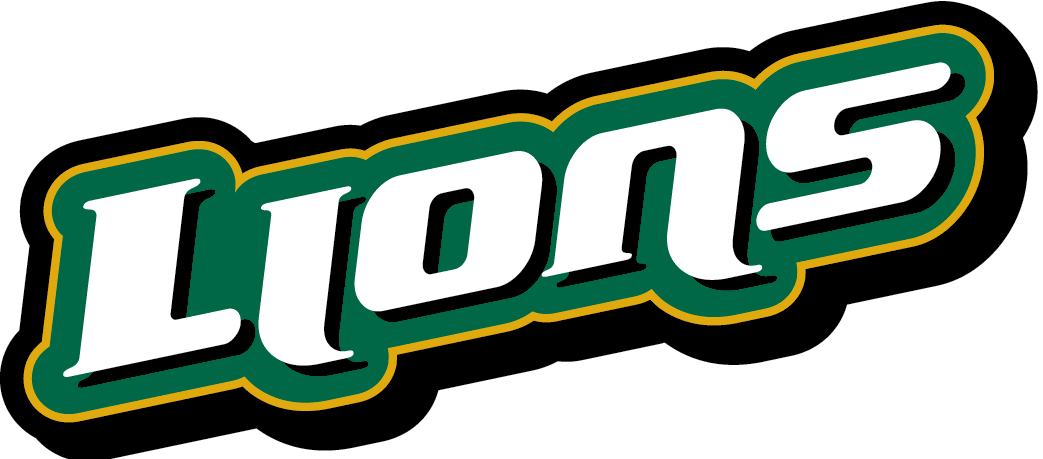
- Conference: Southland Conference

Ranking
- STATS: No. 20
- FCS Coaches: No. 21
- Record: 4–3 (4–2 Southland)
- Head coach: Frank Scelfo (3rd season)
- Offensive coordinator: Greg Stevens (5th season)
- Defensive coordinator: Chris Lachney (1st season)
- Home stadium: Strawberry Stadium

2020 Southland Conference football standings
	Conf.			Overall
Team	W		L	W		L
No. 1 Sam Houston State $^	6	–	0	10	–	0
No. 20 Southeastern Louisiana	4	–	2	4	–	3
No. 23 Nicholls	3	–	3	4	–	3
Incarnate Word	3	–	3	3	–	3
Lamar	2	–	4	2	–	4
McNeese State*	2	–	4	3	–	4
Northwestern State	1	–	5	1	–	5
$ – Conference champion; ^ – FCS playoff participant; * – Ineligible for FCS postseason play due to NCAA sanctions Note: Abilene Christian, Central Arkansas, Houston Baptist, and Stephen F. Austin played only in the fall and opted out of the spring season.; Rankings from STATS Poll

The 2020 Southeastern Louisiana Lions football team represented Southeastern Louisiana University in the 2020–21 NCAA Division I FCS football season. The Lions were led by third-year head coach Frank Scelfo and played their home games at Strawberry Stadium. They competed as a member of the Southland Conference. Although Southland institutions could have chosen to participate in limited fall competition, Southeastern Louisiana announced on August 13, that they would not compete in any athletic competitions in the fall.

== Preseason ==
=== Recruiting class ===
College recruiting information (2020)
Name	Hometown	School	Height	Weight	40^{‡}	Commit date
A'Zyrian "Zy" Alexander; Cornerback	Loreauville, LA	Loreauville HS	6 ft 3 in (1.91 m)	175 lb (79 kg)	-	Dec 18, 2019
A'Zyrian "Zy" Alexander; Cornerback	Recruit ratings: Scout: Rivals: 247Sports: ESPN:					
John Allen; Offensive Line	Jackson, MS	Forest Hill HS; Copiah–Lincoln CC	6 ft 1 in (1.85 m)	320 lb (150 kg)	-	Dec 18, 2019
John Allen; Offensive Line	Recruit ratings: Scout: Rivals: 247Sports: ESPN:					
Kevin "KJ" Bickham; Linebacker	Amite, LA	Amite HS	6 ft 1 in (1.85 m)	180 lb (82 kg)	-	Feb 5, 2020
Kevin "KJ" Bickham; Linebacker	Recruit ratings: Scout: Rivals: 247Sports: ESPN:					
Tijuane Bolton; Defensive End	New Augusta, MS	Perry Central HS; Mississippi Gulf Coast CC	6 ft 3 in (1.91 m)	245 lb (111 kg)	-	Dec 18, 2019
Tijuane Bolton; Defensive End	Recruit ratings: Scout: Rivals: 247Sports: ESPN:					
Terrell Carter; Wide Receiver	San Diego, CA	Madison HS; San Jose State; College of San Mateo	6 ft 2 in (1.88 m)	195 lb (88 kg)	-	Feb 5, 2020
Terrell Carter; Wide Receiver	Recruit ratings: Scout: Rivals: 247Sports: ESPN:					
Cade Collier; Tight End	Mobile, AL	Baker HS	6 ft 6 in (1.98 m)	245 lb (111 kg)	-	Feb 5, 2020
Cade Collier; Tight End	Recruit ratings: Scout: Rivals: 247Sports: ESPN:					
Raymond Cutler; Defensive Back	Prattville, AL	Autauga Academy	5 ft 11 in (1.80 m)	180 lb (82 kg)	-	Feb 5, 2020
Raymond Cutler; Defensive Back	Recruit ratings: Scout: Rivals: 247Sports: ESPN:					
Blayne Delahoussaye; Cornerback	New Iberia, LA	Westgate HS	5 ft 10 in (1.78 m)	160 lb (73 kg)	-	Dec 18, 2019
Blayne Delahoussaye; Cornerback	Recruit ratings: Scout: Rivals: 247Sports: ESPN:					
Terry Delaney III; Defensive Line	Baton Rouge, LA	Tara HS	6 ft 4 in (1.93 m)	315 lb (143 kg)	-	Feb 5, 2020
Terry Delaney III; Defensive Line	Recruit ratings: Scout: Rivals: 247Sports: ESPN:					
Noah Devlin; Offensive Line	New Orleans, LA	De La Salle HS	6 ft 3 in (1.91 m)	290 lb (130 kg)	-	Dec 18, 2019
Noah Devlin; Offensive Line	Recruit ratings: Scout: Rivals: 247Sports: ESPN:					
Ivan Drobocky; Tight End	Bowling Green, KY	Bowling Green HS; IMG Academy	6 ft 4 in (1.93 m)	230 lb (100 kg)	-	Dec 18, 2019
Ivan Drobocky; Tight End	Recruit ratings: Scout: Rivals: 247Sports: ESPN:					
Tyreshon Freeman; Defensive Back	Prattville, AL	Autauga Academy	6 ft 1 in (1.85 m)	180 lb (82 kg)	-	Feb 5, 2020
Tyreshon Freeman; Defensive Back	Recruit ratings: Scout: Rivals: 247Sports: ESPN:					
Jack Henderson; Safety	Mandeville, LA	Mandeville HS	6 ft 3 in (1.91 m)	205 lb (93 kg)	-	Dec 18, 2019
Jack Henderson; Safety	Recruit ratings: Scout: Rivals: 247Sports: ESPN:					
Kamron Johnson; Defensive Line	Saraland, AL	Saraland HS	6 ft 4 in (1.93 m)	210 lb (95 kg)	-	Dec 18, 2019
Kamron Johnson; Defensive Line	Recruit ratings: Scout: Rivals: 247Sports: ESPN:					
Cam Jones; Wide Receiver	Gonzales, LA	East Ascension HS	6 ft 4 in (1.93 m)	230 lb (100 kg)	-	Dec 18, 2019
Cam Jones; Wide Receiver	Recruit ratings: Scout: Rivals: 247Sports: ESPN:					
Jack Landry; Kicker	New Orleans, LA	Brother Martin HS	5 ft 9 in (1.75 m)	160 lb (73 kg)	-	Dec 18, 2019
Jack Landry; Kicker	Recruit ratings: Scout: Rivals: 247Sports: ESPN:					
Jhy Orgeron; Offensive Line	Galliano, LA	South Lafourche HS	6 ft 4 in (1.93 m)	270 lb (120 kg)	-	Dec 18, 2019
Jhy Orgeron; Offensive Line	Recruit ratings: Scout: Rivals: 247Sports: ESPN:					
Eli Sawyer; Quarterback	Vestavia Hills, AL	Vestavia Hills HS	6 ft 2 in (1.88 m)	220 lb (100 kg)	-	Feb 5, 2020
Eli Sawyer; Quarterback	Recruit ratings: Scout: Rivals: 247Sports: ESPN:					
Rodney Sopsher; Defensive Line	Amite, LA	Amite HS; Southwest Mississippi CC	6 ft 1 in (1.85 m)	275 lb (125 kg)	-	Dec 18, 2019
Rodney Sopsher; Defensive Line	Recruit ratings: Scout: Rivals: 247Sports: ESPN:					
TaQuan Thomas; Safety	New Orleans, LA	John F. Kennedy HS	6 ft 0 in (1.83 m)	190 lb (86 kg)	-	Dec 18, 2019
TaQuan Thomas; Safety	Recruit ratings: Scout: Rivals: 247Sports: ESPN:					
Javin Turner; Offensive Line	Patterson, LA	Patterson HS	6 ft 2 in (1.88 m)	285 lb (129 kg)	-	Dec 18, 2019
Javin Turner; Offensive Line	Recruit ratings: Scout: Rivals: 247Sports: ESPN:					
Dominique Webster; Wide Receiver/Tight End	Prattville, AL	Autauga Academy	6 ft 4 in (1.93 m)	200 lb (91 kg)	-	Feb 5, 2020
Dominique Webster; Wide Receiver/Tight End	Recruit ratings: Scout: Rivals: 247Sports: ESPN:					
Jacoby Wells; Safety	Harvey, LA	Helen Cox HS	6 ft 1 in (1.85 m)	200 lb (91 kg)	-	Dec 18, 2019
Jacoby Wells; Safety	Recruit ratings: Scout: Rivals: 247Sports: ESPN:					
Christian Westcott; Quarterback	Mandeville, LA	Lakeshore HS	6 ft 0 in (1.83 m)	210 lb (95 kg)	-	Feb 5, 2020
Christian Westcott; Quarterback	Recruit ratings: Scout: Rivals: 247Sports: ESPN:					
Edward Wilson; Cornerback	Port Allen, LA	Port Allen HS	5 ft 11 in (1.80 m)	175 lb (79 kg)	-	Dec 18, 2019
Edward Wilson; Cornerback	Recruit ratings: Scout: Rivals: 247Sports: ESPN:					

=== Preseason poll ===
The Southland Conference released their spring preseason poll in January 2021. The Lions were picked to finish third in the conference. In addition, six Lions were chosen to the Preseason All-Southland Team

=== Preseason All–Southland Teams ===
Offense

2nd Team

- Matt DeBlasio – Tight End/Running Back, SR
- Austin Mitchell – Wide Receiver, RS-SR
- Drew Jones – Offensive Lineman, SR

Defense

1st Team

- Alexis Ramos – Linebacker, SR
- Ferlando Jordan – Defensive Back, RS-JR

2nd Team

- Josh Carr Jr. – Defensive Lineman, JR

== Roster ==
2020 Southeastern Louisiana Lions football team roster
Players
Coaches
Offense

Pos.	#	Name	Class
RB	1	Morgan Ellison	Jr
WR	3	Anthony Spurlock	So
RB	4	Marcus Cooper	Jr
QB	5	Cephus Johnson III	Jr
WR	6	Nick Kovacs	Jr
WR	7	Terrell Carter	Jr
WR	9	Tim Wilson Jr.	Jr
WR	10	Javon Connor	Sr
QB	12	Eli Sawyer	Fr
QB	13	Jordan Loving	So
QB	15	Cole Kelley	Sr
WR	16	Justin Wendt	So
QB	17	Mason Schucker	So
RB	18	JoMari Becnel	Sr
QB	19	Christian Westcott	Fr
RB	20	Elijah Karnjay	Fr
RB	21	Kendall Collins Jr.	Fr
RB	22	Taron Jones	Jr
WR	23	Troy Hall	Fr
RB	24	Tyrone Wilson	Fr
WR	25	Caleb Blanchard	Fr
WR	27	Salan Weber	Fr
FB	38	Damien Dawson	Sr
WR	41	Taylor Martin	Fr
TE	44	Connor Briggs	Fr
TE	48	Cade Collier	Fr
OL	52	Javin Turner	Fr
OL	53	Keanu Mookini	So
OL	54	Tyree' Rhodes	Jr
OL	55	John Allen	So
OL	56	Brockhim Wicks	Fr
OL	61	Rendon Miles-Character	Sr
OL	62	William Granville	Fr
OL	63	Dom Serapiglia III	Fr
OL	64	Noah Devlin	Fr
OL	65	Kaleb Hogg	So
OL	66	Wyatt Richthofen	Sr
OL	68	Cayden Guzzardo	Fr
OL	70	Ethan McMullan	Sr
OL	72	Brennen Lanclos	So
OL	73	Jhy Oregon	Fr
OL	74	Jalen Bell	Sr
OL	77	Matt Wray	Fr
OL	78	Brendon Kelley	So
OL	79	Drew Jones	Sr
WR	80	Da'shun Hugley	Fr
WR	81	Austin Mitchell	Sr
WR	82	Michael Corner Jr.	Fr
WR	83	CJ Turner	Jr
TE	84	Nic McTear	So
TE	85	Tanner Olsen	So
WR	86	Ed Magee	So
TE	88	Ivan Drobocky	Fr
TE	89	Matt DeBlaiso	Sr

Defense

Pos.	#	Name	Class
DB	2	Ferlando Jordan	Jr
DB	8	Donniel Ward–Magee	Jr
DB	11	Matthew Wright	Sr
DB	12	Champ Craven	Fr
DB	13	Jack Henderson	Fr
DB	14	Zy Alexander	Fr
DB	16	Justin Dumas	Fr
LB	17	Hunter Gill	Fr
DB	18	Derek Turner II	So
DB	20	Dontrell Smith	So
DB	21	Marquis Johnson	So
DB	23	Blayne Delahoussaye	Fr
DB	24	Tyreshon Freeman	Fr
DB	25	TaQuan Thomas	Fr
DB	26	Kelvin Whitaker	Fr
DB	27	Justin Douglas	So
DB	28	Tyrone Legette	So
DB	29	Jaylin Armwood	Fr
LB	30	Alexis Ramos	Sr
DB	31	Robert Buquoi	Fr
LB	32	Mike Mason	Sr
LB	33	Tommy Lee	Fr
LB	34	Arlen Williams	So
LB	39	Gerald Henderson	Fr
DB	40	Jacoby Wells	Fr
DB	41	Sherrod Curry Jr.	So
DB	42	Edward Wilson	Fr
LB	43	Donte' Daniels	Fr
DL	45	Josh Carr Jr.	Jr
LB	46	Herman Christophe IV	So
LB	47	Gladar Huszar	So
LB	48	Dominic Lamm	So
DL	49	Garrett Crawford	So
LB	57	Josh Cook	So
DL	58	Rodney Sopsher	So
DL	63	Blake Champagne	Fr
DL	90	Feletoa Ailua	Sr
LB	91	Darrius Harry	Fr
DL	92	Houston Miller	Sr
DL	93	Kam Johnson	Fr
DL	94	Chandon Hickerson	Sr
DL	96	Tainano Gaulua	Sr
DL	97	Tyrik Mitchell	Fr
DL	98	Cullan Scott	Fr
DL	99	John Graves III	So
DB		Alphonso Taylor	So

Special teams

Pos.	#	Name	Class
P	26	Austin Dunlap	So
K, P	33	Nathan Holliday	So
K	36	Mateo Rengifo	Jr
LS	51	Korey Karbowsky	Fr
LS	59	Jake Rotenberry	Jr
LS	67	Cameron Ryals	Fr
P	82	Cameron Cluney	So

Head coach

- Frank Scelfo (Northeast Louisiana)

Coordinators/assistant coaches

- Greg Stevens (Eastern Oregon)
  Offensive coordinator/quarterbacks
- Chris Lachney (Southeastern Louisiana)
  Interim Defensive Coordinator/Linebackers
- Ross Jenkins (Louisiana Tech)
  Tight ends/special teams coordinator/recruiting coordinator
- Raymond Monica (North Alabama)
  Defensive line
- Tarence Calais (Louisiana Tech)
  Defensive backs
- Kerry Joseph (McNeese State)
  Running backs, passing game coordinator
- A. J. Hopp (Slippery Rock)
  Offensive line
- Giovanni Vizza (Texas A&M)
  Interim Wide Receivers
- Joe Scelfo (South Alabama)
  Guards and Centers
- Antonio Baker (Louisiana Tech)
  Interim Safeties

Legend

- (C) Team captain
- (S) Suspended
- (I) Ineligible
- Injured
- Redshirt

Roster
Last update: April 22, 2020

== Schedule ==
Date	Time	Opponent	Rank	Site	TV	Result	Attendance
February 27	6:00 p.m.	at No. 17 Sam Houston State	No. 18	Bowers Stadium; Huntsville, TX	ESPN+	L 38–43	2,612
March 6	6:00 p.m.	McNeese State	No. 24	Strawberry Stadium; Hammond, LA	ESPN+	W 25–20	3,050
March 13	6:00 p.m.	Northwestern State	No. 18	Strawberry Stadium; Hammond, LA (rivalry)	ESPN+	W 27–24	3,016
March 20	2:00 p.m.	at No. 22 Incarnate Word	No. 16	Gayle and Tom Benson Stadium; San Antonio, TX	ESPN+	L 45–56	1,200
April 3	6:00 p.m.	Lamar	No. 25	Strawberry Stadium; Hammond, LA	ESPN+	W 42–12	2,548
April 10	3:00 p.m.	at No. 18 Nicholls	No. 23	Manning Field at John L. Guidry Stadium; Thibodaux, LA (River Bell Classic)	ESPN+	W 52–45	5,122
April 17	12:00 p.m.	at No. 18 Southern Illinois*	No. 17	Saluki Stadium; Carbondale, IL	ESPN+	L 48–55	2,400
*Non-conference game; Rankings from STATS; All times are in Central time

== Game summaries ==
=== At Sam Houston State ===
Southeastern Louisiana at Sam Houston State

Team	1	2	3	4	Total
No. 18 Lions	7	10	14	7	38
• No. 17 Bearkats	10	10	14	9	43

- Date: February 27, 2021
- Location: Bowers Stadium
  Huntsville, TX
- Game start: 6:05 p.m. CST
- Elapsed time: 4 hours and 6 minutes
- Game attendance: 2,612
- Game weather: 75 °F (24 °C) • Weather: Overcast, Muggy • Wind: 9 S MPH
- Referee: Vidal Jones
- Television network: ESPN+

Scoring summary
1	09:47	SHSU	Ramon Jefferson 59-yard rush (Seth Morgan kick) (9 plays, 89 yards, 3:51)	SHSU 7–0
1	06:08	SELA	Austin Mitchell 1-yard pass from Cole Kelley (Mateo Rengifo kick) (8 plays, 74 yards, 3:32)	TIE 7–7
1	03:01	SHSU	Seth Morgan 39-yard field goal (9 plays, 54 yards, 3:07)	SHSU 10–7
2	14:33	SELA	Taron Jones 4-yard rush (Mateo Rengifo kick) (10 plays, 72 yards, 3:24)	SELA 14–10
2	12:21	SHSU	Noah Smith 4-yard rush (Seth Morgan kick) (5 play, 80 yards, 2:07)	SHSU 17–14
2	06:16	SELA	Mateo Rengifo 36-yard field goal (16 plays, 56 yards, 6:05)	TIE 17–17
2	00:00	SHSU	Seth Morgan 21-yard field goal (8 plays, 64 yards, 1:26)	SHSU 20–17
3	12:43	SHSU	Ife Adeyi 6-yard rush (Seth Morgan kick) (3 plays, 12 yards, 0:37)	SHSU 27–17
3	05:01	SELA	Tim Wilson Jr. 4-yard pass from Cole Kelley (Mateo Rengifo kick) (8 plays, 93 yards, 2:58)	SHSU 27–24
3	04:15	SHSU	Ife Adeyi 78-yard pass fr4om Eric Schmid (Seth Morgan kick) (2 plays, 81 yards, 0:41)	SHSU 34–24
3	00:34	SELA	CJ Turner 11-yard pass from Cole Kelley (Mateo Rengifo kick) (8 plays, 75 yards, 3:41)	SHSU 34–31
4	14:05	SHSU	Jequez Ezzard 30-yard pass from Eric Schmid (Seth Morgan PAT failed) (4 plays, 81 yards, 1:23)	SHSU 40–31
4	08:21	SELA	CJ Turner 10-yard pass from Cole Kelley (Mateo Rengifo kick) (8 plays, 68 yards, 3:14)	SHSU 43–38

Statistics	Southeastern Louisiana	Sam Houston State
First downs	27	26
Total yards	536	672
Rushing yards	74	244
Passing yards	462	428
Turnovers	1	1
Time of possession	33:02	26:58

Team	Category	Player	Statistics
Southeastern Louisiana	Passing	Cole Kelley	36/53, 462 yards, 4 TDs
Southeastern Louisiana	Rushing	Morgan Ellison	12 carries, 29 yards
Southeastern Louisiana	Receiving	CJ Turner	11 receptions, 150 yards, 2 TDs
Sam Houston State	Passing	Eric Schmid	25/40, 428 yards, 2 TDs
Sam Houston State	Rushing	Ramon Jefferson	12 carries, 139 yards, 1 TD
Sam Houston State	Receiving	Chandler Harvin	7 receptions, 118 yards

=== McNeese State ===
McNeese State at Southeastern Louisiana

Team	1	2	3	4	Total
Cowboys	3	3	7	7	20
• No. 24 Lions	3	9	10	3	25

- Date: March 6, 2021
- Location: Strawberry Stadium
  Hammond, LA
- Game start: 6:00 p.m. CST
- Elapsed time: 3 hours and 18 minutes
- Game attendance: 3,050
- Game weather: 62 °F (17 °C) • Weather: Fair • Wind: 9 N MPH
- Referee: Scott Hardin
- Television network: ESPN+

Scoring summary
1	10:52	MCNS	Jacob Abel 21-yard field goal (7 plays, 17 yards, 4:08)	MCNS 3–0
1	03:51	SELA	Mateo Rengifo 27-yard field goal (12 plays, 56 yards, 4:34)	TIE 3–3
2	09:13	SELA	Mateo Rengifo 29-yard field goal (16 plays, 79 yards, 7:02)	SELA 6–3
2	05:58	MCNS	Jacob Abel 45-yard field goal (9 plays, 38 yards, 3:15)	TIE 6–6
2	00:00	SELA	CJ Turner 8-yard pass from Cole Kelley (Mateo Rengifo PAT blocked) (12 play, 80 yards, 2:02)	SELA 12–6
3	11:49	SELA	Morgan Ellison 32-yard rush (Mateo Rengifo kick) (8 plays, 75 yards, 3:11)	SELA 19–6
3	05:18	MCNS	Carlos Williams 9-yard rush (Jacob Abel kick) (7 plays, 61 yards, 2:37)	SELA 19–13
3	01:55	SELA	Mateo Rengifo 32-yard field goal (8 plays, 59 yards, 3:14)	SELA 22–13
4	14:10	MCNS	AJ Carter 2-yard rush (Jacob Abel kick) (8 plays, 67 yards, 2:39)	SELA 22–20
4	09:19	SELA	Mateo Rengifo 33-yard field goal (6 plays, 19 yards, 0:58)	SELA 25–20

Statistics	McNeese State	Southeastern Louisiana
First downs	20	26
Total yards	331	492
Rushing yards	166	191
Passing yards	165	301
Turnovers	4	1
Time of possession	30:59	29:01

Team	Category	Player	Statistics
McNeese State	Passing	Cody Orgeron	13/20, 165 yards, 2 INTs
McNeese State	Rushing	AJ Carter	15 carries, 57 yards, 1 TD
McNeese State	Receiving	Severyn Foster	2 receptions, 75 yards
Southeastern Louisiana	Passing	Cole Kelley	21/39, 301 yards, 1 TD
Southeastern Louisiana	Rushing	Morgan Ellison	15 carries, 127 yards, 1 TD
Southeastern Louisiana	Receiving	Javon Conner	5 receptions, 104 yards

=== Northwestern State ===
Northwestern State at Southeastern Louisiana

Team	1	2	3	4	Total
Demons	14	0	7	3	24
• No. 18 Lions	0	7	7	13	27

- Date: March 13, 2021
- Location: Strawberry Stadium
  Hammond, LA
- Game start: 6:05 p.m. CDT
- Elapsed time: 3 hours and 31 minutes
- Game attendance: 3,016
- Referee: Ed Bourgeois
- Television network: ESPN+

Scoring summary
1	13:36	NSU	Bryce Rivers 1-yard rush (Eddie Godina kick) (4 plays, 14 yards, 1:24)	NSU 7–0
1	01:46	NSU	Scooter Adams 2-yard rush (Eddie Godina kick) (15 plays, 99 yards, 6:15)	NSU 14–0
2	11:20	SELA	Cole Kelley 8-yard pass from Terrell Carter (Mateo Rengifo kick) (11 plays, 83 yards, 5:18)	NSU 14–7
3	10:23	SELA	Matt DeBlaiso 9-yard pass from Cole Kelley (Mateo Rengifo kick) (10 plays, 75 yards, 4:30)	TIE 14–14
3	07:42	NSU	Aubrey Scott 25-yard pass from Gavin Landry (Eddie Godina kick) (1 pla, 25 yards, 0:08)	NSU 21–14
4	14:55	NSU	Eddie Godina 47-yard field goal (10 plays, 50 yards, 4:54)	NSU 24–14
4	12:21	SELA	Cole Kelley 1-yard rush (Mateo Rengifo kick) (8 plays, 83 yards, 2:28)	NSU 24–21
4	03:33	SELA	Mateo Rengifo 26-yard field goal (10 plays, 40 yards, 4:16)	TIE 24–24
4	00:02	SELA	Mateo Rengifo 21-yard field goal (4 plays, 21 yards, 0:28)	SELA 27–24

Statistics	Northwestern State	Southeastern Louisiana
First downs	23	23
Total yards	422	477
Rushing yards	249	131
Passing yards	173	346
Turnovers	1	2
Time of possession	30:46	29:14

Team	Category	Player	Statistics
Northwestern State	Passing	Kaleb Fletcher	7/15, 96 yards, 1 INT
Northwestern State	Rushing	Scooter Adams	19 carries, 100 yards, 1 TD
Northwestern State	Receiving	Marquise Bridges	1 reception, 40 yards
Southeastern Louisiana	Passing	Cole Kelley	28/39, 338 yards, 1 TD, 1 INT
Southeastern Louisiana	Rushing	Morgan Ellison	10 carries, 81 yards
Southeastern Louisiana	Receiving	CJ Turner	9 receptions, 72 yards

=== At Incarnate Word ===
Southeastern Louisiana at Incarnate Word

Team	1	2	3	4	Total
No. 16 Lions	7	9	14	15	45
• No. 22 Cardinals	7	28	21	0	56

- Date: March 20, 2021
- Location: Gayle and Tom Benson Stadium
  San Antonio, TX
- Game start: 2:06 p.m. CDT
- Elapsed time: 3 hours and 50 minutes
- Game attendance: 1,200
- Game weather: 70 °F (21 °C) • Weather: Sunny • Wind: 7 W MPH
- Referee: Vidal Jones
- TV announcers (ESPN+): Randy McIlvoy (play-by-play), Shea Walker (analyst), Lainie Fritz (sideline)

Scoring summary
1	10:31	SELA	Nick Kovacs 5-yard pass from Cole Kelley (Mateo Rengifo kick) (11 plays, 83 yards, 4:29)	SELA 7–0
1	00:15	UIW	Robert Ferrel 7-yard pass from Cam Ward (Carson Mohr kick) (9 plays, 74 yards, 2:27)	TIE 7–7
2	09:30	SELA	Cephus Johnson III 3-yard rush (Mateo Rengifo PAT failed) (16 plays, 78 yards, 5:37)	SELA 13–7
2	08:17	UIW	Cameron Ward 1-yard rush (Carson Mohr kick) (7 plays, 97 yards, 1:11)	UIW 14–13
2	03:10	SELA	Mateo Rengifo 20-yard field goal (13 plays, 72 yards, 5:07)	SELA 16–14
2	02:47	UIW	Kevin Brown 75-yard rush (Carson Mohr kick) (2 plays, 75 yards, 0:23)	UIW 21–16
2	01:09	UIW	Robert Ferrel 3-yard pass from Cameron Ward (Carson Mohr kick) (6 plays, 34 yards, 1:02)	UIW 28–16
2	00:03	UIW	Tre Wolf 26-yard pass from Cameron Ward (Carson Mohr kick) (2 plays, 53 yards, 0:21)	UIW 35–16
3	13:32	UIW	Ameer King 25-yard pass from Cameron Ward (Carson Mohr) (5 plays, 81 yards, 1:23)	UIW 42–16
3	09:51	SELA	Anthony Spurlock 1-yard pass from Cole Kelley (Mateo Rengifo kick) (11 plays, 75 yards, 3:41)	UIW 42–23
3	09:07	UIW	Jaelin Campbell 41-yard pass from Cameron Ward (Carson Mohr kick) (3 plays, 63 yards, 0:36)	UIW 49–23
3	02:11	UIW	Darion Chafin 42-yard pass from Cameron Ward (Carson Mohr kick) (6 plays, 60 yards, 2:47)	UIW 56–23
3	00:02	SELA	Cole Kelley 1-yard rush (Mateo Rengifo kick) (8 plays, 75 yards, 2:09)	UIW 56–30
4	08:43	SELA	Morgan Ellison 1-yard rush (Mateo Rengifo kick) (10 plays, 69 yards, 2:05)	UIW 56–37
4	01:14	SELA	Connor Briggs 1-yard pass from Cole Kelley (Cole Kelley two-point conversion rush) (9 plays, 69 yards, 1:38)	UIW 56–45

Statistics	Southeastern Louisiana	Incarnate Word
First downs	36	27
Total yards	553	655
Rushing yards	122	248
Passing yards	431	407
Turnovers	2	1
Time of possession	34:58	25:02

Team	Category	Player	Statistics
Southeastern Louisiana	Passing	Cole Kelley	38/60, 431 yards, 3 TDs, 1 INT
Southeastern Louisiana	Rushing	Marcus Cooper	10 carries, 56 yards
Southeastern Louisiana	Receiving	Javon Conner	8 receptions, 107 yards
Incarnate Word	Passing	Cam Ward	26/47, 407 yards, 6 TDs
Incarnate Word	Rushing	Kevin Brown	13 carries, 190 yards, 1 TD
Incarnate Word	Receiving	Tre Wolf	8 receptions, 183 yards, 1 TD

=== Lamar ===
Lamar at Southeastern Louisiana

Team	1	2	3	4	Total
Cardinals	2	10	0	0	12
• No. 25 Lions	7	14	14	7	42

- Date: April 3, 2021
- Location: Strawberry Stadium
  Hammond, LA
- Game start: 6:05 p.m. CDT
- Elapsed time: 3 hours
- Game attendance: 2,548
- Referee: Scott Hardin
- Television network: ESPN+

Scoring summary
1	08:04	SELA	Cole Kelley 1-yard rush (Mateo Rengifo kick) (9 plays, 45 yards, 4:01)	SELA 7–0
1	03:35	LAMR	Team Safety (3 plays, -6 yards, 0:51)	SELA 7–2
2	13:36	LAMR	Nathan Gaskamp 1-yard rush (Bailey Giffen kick) (10 plays, 50 yards, 4:59)	LAMR 9–7
2	12:47	SELA	Tim Wilson Jr. 47-yard pass from Cole Kelley (Mateo Rengifo kick) (2 plays, 63 yards, 0:43)	SELA 14–9
2	07:58	LAMR	Bailey Giffen 31-yard field goal (4 plays, 8 yards, 1:52)	SELA 14–12
2	04:40	SELA	Cole Kelley 1-yard rush (Mateo Rengifo kick) (8 plays, 85 yards, 3:12)	SELA 21–12
3	11:46	SELA	Tim Wilson Jr. 8-yard pass from Cole Kelley (Mateo Rengifo kick) (6 plays, 63 yards, 3:09)	SELA 28–12
3	01:18	SELA	Marcus Cooper 5-yard pass from Cole Kelley (Mateo Rengifo kick) (10 plays, 93 yards, 4:40)	SELA 35–12
4	03:52	SELA	Anthony Spurlock 24-yard pass from Cephus Johnson III (Mateo Rengifo kick) (7 plays, 80 yards, 4:10)	SELA 42–12

Statistics	Lamar	Southeastern Louisiana
First downs	15	26
Total yards	298	468
Rushing yards	181	123
Passing yards	117	345
Turnovers	2	2
Time of possession	34:26	25:34

Team	Category	Player	Statistics
Lamar	Passing	Jalen Dummett	10/15, 111 yards, 2 INTs
Lamar	Rushing	Jaylon Jackson	12 carries, 69 yards
Lamar	Receiving	Kirkland Banks	3 receptions, 36 yards
Southeastern Louisiana	Passing	Cole Kelley	23/31, 321 yards, 3 TDs, 2 INTs
Southeastern Louisiana	Rushing	Cephus Johnson III	3 carries, 48 yards
Southeastern Louisiana	Receiving	Javon Conner	4 receptions, 70 yards

=== At Nicholls ===
Southeastern Louisiana at Nicholls

Team	1	2	3	4	Total
• No. 23 Lions	14	3	21	14	52
No. 18 Colonels	10	14	6	15	45

- Date: April 10, 2021
- Location: Manning Field at John L. Guidry Stadium
  Thibodaux, LA
- Game start: 3:05 p.m. CDT
- Elapsed time: 3 hours and 34 minutes
- Game attendance: 5,122
- Game weather: 80 °F (27 °C) • Weather: Partly Cloudy • Wind: 5 W MPH
- Referee: Ed Bourgeois
- Television network: ESPN+

Scoring summary
1	10:29	SELA	Cole Kelley 6-yard pass from Terrell Carter (Mateo Rengifo kick) (13 plays, 75 yards, 4:31)	SELA 7–0
1	07:03	NICH	Gavin Lasseigne 31-yard field goal (9 plays, 51 yards, 3:26)	SELA 7–3
1	04:17	SELA	CJ Turner 4-yard pass from Cole Kelley (Mateo Rengifo kick) (7 plays, 75 yards, 2:46)	SELA 14–3
1	01:24	NICH	Julien Gums 1-yard rush (Gavin Lasseigne kick) (7 plays, 91 yards, 2:45)	SELA 14–10
2	08:27	NICH	Julien Gums 4-yard rush (Gavin Lasseigne kick) (11 plays, 80 yards, 3:10)	NICH 17–14
2	02:57	NICH	Julien Gums 3-yard rush (Gavin Lasseigne kick) (8 plays, 59 yards, 3:19)	NICH 24–14
2	00:16	SELA	Mateo Rengifo 21-yard field goal (11 plays, 61 yards, 2:41)	NICH 24–17
3	14:28	SELA	Ferlando Jordan 35-yard interception returned (Mateo Rengifo kick) (3 plays, 2 yards, 0:32)	TIE 24–24
3	09:24	SELA	CJ Turner 8-yard pass from Cole Kelley (Mateo Rengifo kick) (7 plays, 45 yards, 2:54)	SELA 31–24
3	07:32	NICH	Lindsey Scott Jr. 25-yard rush (Gavin Lasseigne PAT blocked) (5 plays, 50 yards, 1:45)	SELA 31–30
3	04:21	SELA	Jack Henderson 23-yard interception returned (Mateo Rengifo kick) (3 plays, 5 yards, 1:15)	SELA 38–30
4	14:55	NICH	Julien Gums 4-yard rush (Lindsey Scott Jr. two-point conversion pass to K. J. Franklin) (11 plays, 75 yards, 4:26)	TIE 38–38
4	13:18	SELA	Marcus Cooper 45-yard pass from Cole Kelley (Mateo Rengifo kick) (5 plays, 65 yards, 1:37)	SELA 45–38
4	08:09	SELA	Nick Kovacs 20-yard pass from Cole Kelley (Mateo Rengifo kick) (10 plays, 39 yards, 5:02)	SELA 52–38
4	01:34	NICH	Tahj Smith 15-yard pass from Lindsey Scott Jr. (Gavin Lasseigne kick) (9 plays, 90 yards, 1:52)	SELA 52–45

Statistics	Southeastern Louisiana	Nicholls
First downs	25	30
Total yards	499	478
Rushing yards	81	217
Passing yards	418	261
Turnovers	0	4
Time of possession	33:36	26:24

Team	Category	Player	Statistics
Southeastern Louisiana	Passing	Cole Kelley	30/41, 391 yards, 4 TDs
Southeastern Louisiana	Rushing	Taron Jones	10 carries, 31 yards
Southeastern Louisiana	Receiving	CJ Turner	11 receptions, 110 yards, 2 TDs
Nicholls	Passing	Lindsey Scott Jr.	19/38, 261 yards, 1 TD, 4 INTs
Nicholls	Rushing	Lindsey Scott Jr.	11 carries, 90 yards, 1 TD
Nicholls	Receiving	Dai'Jean Dixon	5 receptions, 92 yards

=== At Southern Illinois ===
Southeastern Louisiana at Southern Illinois

Team	1	2	3	4	Total
No. 17 Lions	13	14	14	7	48
• No. 18 Salukis	14	20	14	7	55

- Date: April 17, 2021
- Location: Saluki Stadium
  Carbondale, IL
- Game start: 12:06 p.m. CDT
- Elapsed time: 3 hours and 33 minutes
- Game attendance: 2,400
- Game weather: 54 °F (12 °C) • Weather: Partly Cloudy • Wind: 8 WNW MPH
- Referee: Matt Packowski
- Television network: ESPN+

Scoring summary
1	12:06	SELA	Cole Kelley 1-yard rush (Mateo Rengifo PAT failed) (7 plays, 75 yards, 2:54)	SELA 6–0
1	09:51	SIU	Stone Labanowitz 4-yard rush (Nico Gauldoni kick) (7 plays, 65 yards, 2:08)	SIU 7–6
1	04:12	SIU	Justin Strong 3-yard rush (Nico Gauldoni kick) (9 plays, 91 yards, 2:56)	SIU 14–6
1	02:22	SELA	Cole Kelley 3-yard rush (Mateo Rengifo kick) (5 plays, 75 yards, 1:50)	SIU 14–13
2	14:06	SIU	Javon Williams 1-yard rush (Nico Gauldoni kick) (9 plays, 82 yards, 3:10)	SIU 21–13
2	10:27	SELA	Cole Kelley 13-yard rush (Mateo Rengifo kick) (8 plays, 72 yards, 3:34)	SIU 21–20
2	07:05	SIU	Javon Williams Jr. 8-yard rush (two-point conversion rush failed) (8 plays, 75 yards, 3:22)	SIU 27–20
2	02:53	SELA	Nick Kovacs 12-yard pass from Cole Kelley (Mateo Rengifo kick) (9 plays, 75 yards, 4:12)	TIE 27–27
2	00:10	SIU	Landon Lenoir 8-yard pass from Stone Labanowitz (Nico Gauldoni kick) (11 plays, 75 yards, 2:43)	SIU 34–27
3	14:35	SIU	Avante Cox 47-yard pass from Stone Labanowitz (Nico Gauldoni kick) (2 plays, 75 yards, 0:25)	SIU 41–27
3	08:10	SELA	Taron Jones 2-yard rush (Mateo Rengifo kick) (4 plays, 79 yards, 1:28)	SIU 41–34
3	03:26	SELA	CJ Turner 11-yard rush (Mateo Rengifo kick) (10 plays, 62 yards, 4:26)	TIE 41–41
3	01:38	SIU	Jacob Garrett 56-yard pass from Javon Williams Jr. (Nico Gauldoni kick) (4 plays, 75 yards, 1:48)	SIU 48–41
4	07:53	SIU	Justin Strong 9-yard rush (Nico Gauldoni kick) (7 plays, 82 yards, 2:11)	SIU 55–41
4	05:08	SELA	Tim Wilson Jr. 15-yard pass from Cole Kelley (Mateo Rengifo kick) (8 plays, 75 yards, 2:45)	SIU 55–48

Statistics	Southeastern Louisiana	Southern Illinois
First downs	34	36
Total yards	557	808
Rushing yards	117	424
Passing yards	440	384
Turnovers	1	1
Time of possession	32:26	27:34

Team	Category	Player	Statistics
Southeastern Louisiana	Passing	Cole Kelley	34/42, 418 yards, 2 TDs
Southeastern Louisiana	Rushing	Taron Jones	7 carries, 43 yards, 1 TD
Southeastern Louisiana	Receiving	Austin Mitchell	5 receptions, 109 yards
Southern Illinois	Passing	Stone Labanowitz	20/24, 328 yards, 2 TDs
Southern Illinois	Rushing	Justin Strong	16 carries, 159 yards, 2 TDs
Southern Illinois	Receiving	Landon Lenoir	7 receptions, 128 yards, 1 TD
