= 2020 Northwestern State Demons football team =

American college football season

2020 Northwestern State Demons football
- Conference: Southland Conference
- Record: 1–5 (1–5 SLC)
- Head coach: Brad Laird (3rd season)
- Offensive coordinator: Brad Smiley (3rd season)
- Offensive scheme: Spread
- Defensive coordinator: Mike Lucas (4th season)
- Base defense: 3–4
- Home stadium: Harry Turpin Stadium

2020 Southland Conference football standings
	Conf.			Overall
Team	W		L	W		L
No. 1 Sam Houston State $^	6	–	0	10	–	0
No. 20 Southeastern Louisiana	4	–	2	4	–	3
No. 23 Nicholls	3	–	3	4	–	3
Incarnate Word	3	–	3	3	–	3
Lamar	2	–	4	2	–	4
McNeese State*	2	–	4	3	–	4
Northwestern State	1	–	5	1	–	5
$ – Conference champion; ^ – FCS playoff participant; * – Ineligible for FCS postseason play due to NCAA sanctions Note: Abilene Christian, Central Arkansas, Houston Baptist, and Stephen F. Austin played only in the fall and opted out of the spring season.; Rankings from STATS Poll

The 2020 Northwestern State Demons football team represented Northwestern State University as a member of the Southland Conference during the 2020–21 NCAA Division I FCS football season. Led by third-year head coach Brad Laird, the Demons compiled an overall record of 1–5 with an identical mark in conference play, placing last out of seven teams in the Southland. Northwestern State played home games at Harry Turpin Stadium in Natchitoches, Louisiana.

== Preseason ==
=== Recruiting class ===
College recruiting information (2020)
Name	Hometown	School	Height	Weight	Commit date
Scooter Adams; Running Back	Hallettsville, TX	Hallettsville HS; Kilgore College	5 ft 9 in (1.75 m)	190 lb (86 kg)	Feb 5, 2020
Scooter Adams; Running Back	Recruit ratings: Scout: Rivals: 247Sports: ESPN:				
Marquise Bridges; Wide Receiver	Brookhaven, MS	Petal HS; Mississippi Gulf Coast CC	6 ft 1 in (1.85 m)	193 lb (88 kg)	Feb 5, 2020
Marquise Bridges; Wide Receiver	Recruit ratings: Scout: Rivals: 247Sports: ESPN:				
Logan Canerdy; Offensive Line	Caledonia, MS	Caledonia HS; Jones County JC	6 ft 3 in (1.91 m)	295 lb (134 kg)	Feb 5, 2020
Logan Canerdy; Offensive Line	Recruit ratings: Scout: Rivals: 247Sports: ESPN:				
Malik Carey; Cornerback	Shreveport, LA	Captain Shreve HS	6 ft 2 in (1.88 m)	185 lb (84 kg)	Feb 5, 2020
Malik Carey; Cornerback	Recruit ratings: Scout: Rivals: 247Sports: ESPN:				
Natea "Tay" Coleman; Safety	Beaumont, TX	West Brook HS	6 ft 0 in (1.83 m)	185 lb (84 kg)	Feb 5, 2020
Natea "Tay" Coleman; Safety	Recruit ratings: Scout: Rivals: 247Sports: ESPN:				
Kevin Davis, Jr. Safety	Freeport, TX	Brazosport HS	6 ft 0 in (1.83 m)	180 lb (82 kg)	Feb 5, 2020
Kevin Davis, Jr. Safety	Recruit ratings: Scout: Rivals: 247Sports: ESPN:				
Cayden Dunn; Running Back	Los Angeles, CA	Bishop Alemany HS; College of the Canyons	5 ft 10 in (1.78 m)	190 lb (86 kg)	Feb 5, 2020
Cayden Dunn; Running Back	Recruit ratings: Scout: Rivals: 247Sports: ESPN:				
Logan Gabriel; Running Back	Opelousas, LA	Lafayette Christian Academy	5 ft 11 in (1.80 m)	220 lb (100 kg)	Feb 5, 2020
Logan Gabriel; Running Back	Recruit ratings: Scout: Rivals: 247Sports: ESPN:				
Eddie Godina; Kicker	Whitehouse, TX	Whitehouse HS; Trinity Valley CC	5 ft 11 in (1.80 m)	195 lb (88 kg)	Feb 5, 2020
Eddie Godina; Kicker	Recruit ratings: Scout: Rivals: 247Sports: ESPN:				
Kendal Harmon; Defensive Line	Crowley, LA	Crowley HS	6 ft 2 in (1.88 m)	273 lb (124 kg)	Feb 5, 2020
Kendal Harmon; Defensive Line	Recruit ratings: Scout: Rivals: 247Sports: ESPN:				
PJ Herrington; Defensive Back	Natchez, MS	Natchez HS; East Mississippi CC	5 ft 10 in (1.78 m)	185 lb (84 kg)	Feb 5, 2020
PJ Herrington; Defensive Back	Recruit ratings: Scout: Rivals: 247Sports: ESPN:				
Jewell Holmes, III; Wide Receiver	New Orleans, LA	Warren Easton HS	6 ft 2 in (1.88 m)	188 lb (85 kg)	Feb 5, 2020
Jewell Holmes, III; Wide Receiver	Recruit ratings: Scout: Rivals: 247Sports: ESPN:				
Monte Johnson; Tight End	Burleson, TX	Burleson Centennial HS	6 ft 5 in (1.96 m)	220 lb (100 kg)	Feb 5, 2020
Monte Johnson; Tight End	Recruit ratings: Scout: Rivals: 247Sports: ESPN:				
Princeton Malbrue; Outside Linebacker	Carencro, LA	Lafayette Christian Academy	6 ft 2 in (1.88 m)	205 lb (93 kg)	Feb 5, 2020
Princeton Malbrue; Outside Linebacker	Recruit ratings: Scout: Rivals: 247Sports: ESPN:				
Jordan McClaine; Offensive Line	Ruston, LA	Ruston HS	6 ft 3 in (1.91 m)	280 lb (130 kg)	Feb 5, 2020
Jordan McClaine; Offensive Line	Recruit ratings: Scout: Rivals: 247Sports: ESPN:				
Johnny Mitchell, Jr. Defensive Line	Stonewall, LA	North DeSoto HS	6 ft 3 in (1.91 m)	310 lb (140 kg)	Feb 5, 2020
Johnny Mitchell, Jr. Defensive Line	Recruit ratings: Scout: Rivals: 247Sports: ESPN:				
Jalen Momerelle offensive Line	Houston, TX	Manvel HS; Navarro College/Texas State	6 ft 6 in (1.98 m)	305 lb (138 kg)	Feb 5, 2020
Jalen Momerelle offensive Line	Recruit ratings: Scout: Rivals: 247Sports: ESPN:				
Andy Pierre-Antoine; Wide Receiver	North Miami, FL	North Miami Sr. HS; Reedley College	6 ft 1 in (1.85 m)	190 lb (86 kg)	Feb 5, 2020
Andy Pierre-Antoine; Wide Receiver	Recruit ratings: Scout: Rivals: 247Sports: ESPN:				
Isaiah Robinson; Defensive Back	Bossier City, LA	Parkway HS	6 ft 1 in (1.85 m)	185 lb (84 kg)	Feb 5, 2020
Isaiah Robinson; Defensive Back	Recruit ratings: Scout: Rivals: 247Sports: ESPN:				
Brayden Staggs; Offensive Line	Cypress, TX	Langham Creek HS	6 ft 4 in (1.93 m)	285 lb (129 kg)	Feb 5, 2020
Brayden Staggs; Offensive Line	Recruit ratings: Scout: Rivals: 247Sports: ESPN:				
Dante Thomas; Defensive Back	Hammond, LA	John Curtis HS	6 ft 0 in (1.83 m)	175 lb (79 kg)	Feb 5, 2020
Dante Thomas; Defensive Back	Recruit ratings: Scout: Rivals: 247Sports: ESPN:				
Jaheim Walters; Wide Receiver	New Orleans, LA	St. Augustine HS	6 ft 2 in (1.88 m)	184 lb (83 kg)	Feb 5, 2020
Jaheim Walters; Wide Receiver	Recruit ratings: Scout: Rivals: 247Sports: ESPN:				
Malik Williams; Linebacker	Gilmer, TX	Gilmer HS	6 ft 0 in (1.83 m)	205 lb (93 kg)	Feb 5, 2020
Malik Williams; Linebacker	Recruit ratings: Scout: Rivals: 247Sports: ESPN:				

=== Preseason poll ===
The Southland Conference released their spring preseason poll in January 2021. The Demons were picked to finish sixth in the conference. In addition, two Demons were chosen to the Preseason All-Southland Team

=== Preseason All–Southland Teams ===
Defense

1st Team

- Ja'Quay Pough – Linebacker, SR

2nd Team

- Shemar Bartholomew – Defensive Back, JR

== Schedule ==
Date	Time	Opponent	Site	TV	Result	Attendance
March 6	6:00 p.m.	No. 7 Nicholls	Harry Turpin Stadium; Natchitoches, LA (NSU Challenge)	ESPN+	L 24–31	4,305
March 13	6:00 p.m.	at No. 18 Southeastern Louisiana	Strawberry Stadium; Hammond, LA (rivalry)	ESPN+	L 24–27	3,016
March 20	4:00 p.m.	McNeese State	Harry Turpin Stadium; Natchitoches, LA (rivalry)	CST	L 7–21	6,577
March 27	3:00 p.m.	at Lamar	Provost Umphrey Stadium; Beaumont, TX	ESPN+	L 23–31	3,833
April 1	6:00 p.m.	No. 5 Sam Houston State	Harry Turpin Stadium; Natchitoches, LA	ESPN+	L 16–24	1,221
April 10	7:00 p.m.	at No. 19 Incarnate Word	Gayle and Tom Benson Stadium; San Antonio, TX	ESPN+	W 49–47	1,055
Rankings from STATS Poll released prior to the game; All times are in Central time

== Game summaries ==
=== Nicholls ===
Nicholls at Northwestern State

Team	1	2	3	4	Total
• No. 7 Colonels	14	7	3	7	31
Demons	7	0	10	7	24

- Date: February 19, 2021
- Location: Harry Turpin Stadium
  Natchitoches, LA
- Game start: 6:00 p.m. CST
- Elapsed time: 3 hours and 37 minutes
- Game attendance: 4,305
- Game weather: 58 °F (14 °C) • Weather: Clear
- Television network: ESPN+

Scoring summary
1	08:10	NICH	Julien Gums 5-yard rush (Gavin Lasseigne kick) (13 plays, 66 yards, 5:59)	NICH 7–0
1	06:24	NSU	Scooter Adams 58-yard rush (Eddie Godina kick) (5 plays, 78 yards, 1:40)	TIE 7–7
1	02:17	NICH	Dai'Jean Dixon 6-yard pass from Lindsey Scott Jr. (Gavin Lasseigne kick)br/>(9 plays, 69 yards, 4:01)	NICH 14–7
2	14:07	NICH	Dai'Jean Dixon 1-yard pass from Lindsey Scott Jr. (Gavin Lasseigne kick) (4 play, 69 yards, 0:56)	NICH 21–7
3	09:03	NSU	Aubrey Scott 80-yard rush (Eddie Godina kick) (1 play, 80 yards, 0:13)	NICH 21–14
3	04:04	NICH	Gavin Lasseigne 30-yard field goal (10 plays, 58 yards, 4:51)	NICH 24–14
3	01:01	NSU	Eddie Godina 25-yard field goal (8 plays, 32 yards, 2:50)	NICH 24–17
4	14:45	NICH	David Robertson Jr. 42-yard pass from Lindsey Scott Jr. (Gavin Lasseigne kick) (4 plays, 76 yards, 1:10)	NICH 31–17
4	05:40	NSU	Gavin Landry 13-yard pass from Kaleb Fletcher (Eddie Godina kick) (9 plays, 76 yards, 2:26)	NICH 31–24

Statistics	Nicholls	Northwestern State
First downs	29	12
Total yards	545	304
Rushing yards	246	237
Passing yards	299	67
Turnovers	2	0
Time of possession	39:31	20:29

Team	Category	Player	Statistics
Nicholls	Passing	Lindsey Scott Jr.	21/33, 229 yards, 3 TDs, 1 INT
Nicholls	Rushing	Julien Gums	36 carries, 156 yards, 1 TD
Nicholls	Receiving	Dai'Jean Dixon	7 receptions, 115 yards, 2 TDs
Northwestern State	Passing	Kaleb Fletcher	8/17, 49 yards, 1 TD
Northwestern State	Rushing	Aubrey Scott	9 carries, 119 yards, 1 TD
Northwestern State	Receiving	Gavin Landry	2 receptions, 19 yards, 1 TD

=== At Southeastern Louisiana ===
Northwestern State at Southeastern Louisiana

Team	1	2	3	4	Total
Demons	14	0	7	3	24
• No. 18 Lions	0	7	7	13	27

- Date: March 13, 2021
- Location: Strawberry Stadium
  Hammond, LA
- Game start: 6:05 p.m. CDT
- Elapsed time: 3 hours and 31 minutes
- Game attendance: 3,016
- Referee: Ed Bourgeois
- Television network: ESPN+

Scoring summary
1	13:36	NSU	Bryce Rivers 1-yard rush (Eddie Godina kick) (4 plays, 14 yards, 1:24)	NSU 7–0
1	01:46	NSU	Scooter Adams 2-yard rush (Eddie Godina kick) (15 plays, 99 yards, 6:15)	NSU 14–0
2	11:20	SELA	Cole Kelley 8-yard pass from Terrell Carter (Mateo Rengifo kick) (11 plays, 83 yards, 5:18)	NSU 14–7
3	10:23	SELA	Matt DeBlaiso 9-yard pass from Cole Kelley (Mateo Rengifo kick) (10 plays, 75 yards, 4:30)	TIE 14–14
3	07:42	NSU	Aubrey Scott 25-yard pass from Gavin Landry (Eddie Godina kick) (1 pla, 25 yards, 0:08)	NSU 21–14
4	14:55	NSU	Eddie Godina 47-yard field goal (10 plays, 50 yards, 4:54)	NSU 24–14
4	12:21	SELA	Cole Kelley 1-yard rush (Mateo Rengifo kick) (8 plays, 83 yards, 2:28)	NSU 24–21
4	03:33	SELA	Mateo Rengifo 26-yard field goal (10 plays, 40 yards, 4:16)	TIE 24–24
4	00:02	SELA	Mateo Rengifo 21-yard field goal (4 plays, 21 yards, 0:28)	SELA 27–24

Statistics	Northwestern State	Southeastern Louisiana
First downs	23	23
Total yards	422	477
Rushing yards	249	131
Passing yards	173	346
Turnovers	1	2
Time of possession	30:46	29:14

Team	Category	Player	Statistics
Northwestern State	Passing	Kaleb Fletcher	7/15, 96 yards, 1 INT
Northwestern State	Rushing	Scooter Adams	19 carries, 100 yards, 1 TD
Northwestern State	Receiving	Marquise Bridges	1 reception, 40 yards
Southeastern Louisiana	Passing	Cole Kelley	28/39, 338 yards, 1 TD, 1 INT
Southeastern Louisiana	Rushing	Morgan Ellison	10 carries, 81 yards
Southeastern Louisiana	Receiving	CJ Turner	9 receptions, 72 yards

=== McNeese State ===
McNeese State at Northwestern State

Team	1	2	3	4	Total
• Cowboys	7	0	14	0	21
Demons	7	0	0	0	7

- Date: March 20, 2021
- Location: Harry Turpin Stadium
  Natchitoches, LA
- Game start: 4:00 p.m. CDT
- Elapsed time: 3 hours and 6 minutes
- Game attendance: 6,577
- Game weather: 55 °F (13 °C) • Weather: Cloudy • Wind: SW 6 MPH
- Referee: Ed Bourgeois
- Television network: CST

Scoring summary
1	04:42	NSU	Kendrick Price 13-yard pass from Kaleb Fletcher (Eddie Godina kick) (8 plays, 91 yards, 3:28)	NSU 7–0
1	02:07	MCNS	Jamal Pettigrew 2-yard pass from Cody Orgeron (Jacob Abel kick) (5 plays, 59 yards, 2:29)	TIE 7–7
3	13:45	MCNS	Trevor Begue 75-yard pass from Cody Orgeron (Jacob Abel kick) (3 plays, 96 yards, 1:07)	MCNS 14–7
3	07:45	MCNS	Walker Wood 1-yard rush (Jacob Abel kick) (7 plays, 66 yards, 2:30)	MCNS 21–7

Statistics	McNeese State	Northwestern State
First downs	20	21
Total yards	416	394
Rushing yards	110	33
Passing yards	306	361
Turnovers	1	2
Time of possession	30:36	29:24

Team	Category	Player	Statistics
McNeese State	Passing	Cody Orgeron	17/22, 306 yards, 2 TDs
McNeese State	Rushing	Josh Parker	16 carries, 77 yards
McNeese State	Receiving	Trevor Begue	8 receptions, 165 yards, 1 TD
Northwestern State	Passing	Kaleb Fletcher	13/18, 171 yards, 1 TD
Northwestern State	Rushing	Scooter Adams	8 carries, 37 yards
Northwestern State	Receiving	Javon Antonio	6 receptions, 103 yards

=== At Lamar ===
Northwestern State at Lamar

Team	1	2	3	4	Total
Demons	0	7	0	16	23
• Cardinals	14	14	3	0	31

- Date: March 27, 2021
- Location: Provost Umphrey Stadium
  Beaumont, TX
- Game start: 3:00 p.m. CDT
- Elapsed time: 3 hours and 26 minutes
- Game attendance: 3,833
- Game weather: 81 °F (27 °C) • Weather: Cloudy and Humid • Wind: SSE 13 MPH
- Referee: Vidal Jones
- Television network: ESPN+

Scoring summary
1	09:34	LAMR	Chaz Ward 1-yard rush (Bailey Giffen kick) (13 plays, 75 yards, 5:25)	LAMR 7–0
1	04:09	LAMR	Connor Ventis 10-yard pass from Jalen Dummett (Bailey Giffen kick) (8 plays, 73 yards, 4:09)	LAMR 14–0
2	12:12	LAMR	Jalen Dummett 31-yard rush (Bailey Giffen kick) (3 plays, 25 yards, 0:52)	LAMR 21–0
2	04:37	LAMR	Jacoby Davis 0-yard return of blocked punt (Bailey Giffen kick) (3 plays, 0 yards, 0:25)	LAMR 28–0
2	02:42	NSU	Scooter Adams 63-yard rush (Eddie Godina kick) (4 plays, 75 yards, 1:55)	LAMR 28–7
3	05:11	LAMR	Bailey Giffen 43-yard field goal (7 plays, 34 yards, 3:17)	LAMR 31–7
4	12:19	NSU	Scooter Adams 25-yard rush (Bryce Rivers two-point conversion pass to Javon Antonio) (2 plays, 25 yards, 0:15)	LAMR 31–15
4	01:18	NSU	Javon Antonio 9-yard pass from Bryce Rivers (Bryce Rivers two-point conversion pass to Javon Antonio) (5 plays, 80 yards, 0:37)	LAMR 31–23

Statistics	Northwestern State	Lamar
First downs	17	19
Total yards	409	358
Rushing yards	215	239
Passing yards	194	119
Turnovers	3	0
Time of possession	19:46	40:14

Team	Category	Player	Statistics
Northwestern State	Passing	Bryce Rivers	7/19, 136 yards, 1 TD
Northwestern State	Rushing	Scooter Adams	18 carries, 212 yards, 2 TDs
Northwestern State	Receiving	Marquise Bridges	1 reception, 45 yards
Lamar	Passing	Jalen Dummett	6/12, 94 yards, 1 TD
Lamar	Rushing	Jalen Dummett	13 carries, 84 yards, 1 TD
Lamar	Receiving	Kirkland Banks	2 receptions, 43 yards

=== Sam Houston State ===
Sam Houston State at Northwestern State

Team	1	2	3	4	Total
• No. 5 Bearkats	7	7	7	3	24
Demons	0	3	0	13	16

- Date: April 1, 2021
- Location: Harry Turpin Stadium
  Natchitoches, LA
- Game start: 6:05 p.m. CDT
- Elapsed time: 3 hours and 35 minutes
- Game attendance: 1,221
- Game weather: 65 °F (18 °C) • Weather: Sunny and Clear • Wind: 11 SW MPH
- Referee: Ed Bourgeois
- Television network: ESPN+

Scoring summary
1	11:43	SHSU	Cody Chrest 28-yard pass from Eric Schmid (Seth Morgan kick) (6 plays, 51 yards, 1:40)	SHSU 7–0
2	02:19	SHSU	Ife Adeyi 19-yard pass from Eric Schmid (Seth Morgan kick) (8 plays, 76 yards, 3:14)	SHSU 14–0
2	00:00	NSU	Eddie Godina 35-yard field goal (12 plays, 62 yard, 2:12)	SHSU 14–3
3	05:55	SHSU	Donovan Williams 6-yard rush (Seth Morgan kick) (7 plays, 70 yards, 2:12)	SHSU 21–3
4	13:44	NSU	Marquise Bridges 20-yard pass from Bryce Rivers (Eddie Godina PAT blocked) (1 play, 20 yards, 0:06)	SHSU 21–9
4	10:13	SHSU	Seth Morgan 41-yard field goal (8 plays, 50 yards, 3:30)	SHSU 24–9
4	00:21	NSU	Javon Antonio 7-yard pass from Bryce Rivers (Eddie Godina kick) (12 plays, 85 yards, 2:12)	SHSU 24–16

Statistics	Sam Houston State	Northwestern State
First downs	23	24
Total yards	445	453
Rushing yards	133	43
Passing yards	312	410
Turnovers	2	3
Time of possession	32:30	27:30

Team	Category	Player	Statistics
Sam Houston State	Passing	Eric Schmid	22/41, 312 yards, 2 TDs, 2 INTs
Sam Houston State	Rushing	Ramon Jefferson	18 carries, 107 yards
Sam Houston State	Receiving	Ife Adeyi	6 receptions, 134 yards, 1 TD
Northwestern State	Passing	Bryce Rivers	29/51, 410 yards, 2 TDs
Northwestern State	Rushing	Scooter Adams	13 carries, 34 yards
Northwestern State	Receiving	Javon Antonio	10 receptions, 190 yards, 1 TD

=== At Incarnate Word ===
Northwestern State at Incarnate Word

Team	1	2	3	4	Total
• Demons	17	0	9	23	49
No. 19 Cardinals	10	13	7	17	47

- Date: April 10, 2021
- Location: Gayle and Tom Benson Stadium
  San Antonio, TX
- Game start: 7:05 p.m. CDT
- Elapsed time: 4 hours and 4 minutes
- Game attendance: 1,055
- Game weather: 82 °F (28 °C) • Weather: Clear • Wind: NE 9 MPH
- Referee: Vidal Jones
- TV announcers (ESPN+): Randy McIlvoy (play-by-play), Taylor McHargue (analyst), Lainie Fritz (sideline)

Scoring summary
1	12:10	NSU	Levar Gumms 12-yard pass from Bryce Rivers (Eddie Godina kick) (7 plays, 75 yards, 2:50)	NSU 7–0
1	08:39	UIW	Robert Ferrel 23-yard rush (Carson Mohr kick) (9 plays, 80 yards, 3:24)	TIE 7–7
1	05:01	NSU	Eddie Godina 30-yard field goal (10 plays, 62 yard, 3:38)	NSU 10–7
1	00:40	UIW	Carson Mohr 32-yard field goal (8 plays, 45 yards, 3:17)	TIE 10–10
1	00:00	NSU	Scooter Adams 64-yard rush (Eddie Godina kick) (3 plays, 75 yards, 0:40)	NSU 17–10
2	07:52	UIW	Kevin Brown 1-yard rush (Carson Mohr PAT failed) (4 plays, 15 yards, 1:25)	NSU 17–16
2	05:21	UIW	Kevin Brown 3-yard rush (Carson Mohr kick) (5 plays, 63 yards, 1:03)	UIW 23–17
3	11:25	NSU	Javon Antonio 38-yard pass from Bryce Rivers (two-point conversion rush) (6 plays, 75 yards, 2:43)	TIE 23–23
3	05:32	NSU	Eddie Godina 42-yard field goal (11 plays, 75 yards, 3:37)	NSU 26–23
3	04:13	UIW	Kevin Brown 53-yard rush (Carson Mohr kick) (5 plays, 64 yards, 1:07)	UIW 30–26
4	11:47	UIW	Robert Ferrel 23-yard pass from Cam Ward (Carson Mohr kick) (11 plays, 79 yards, 3:25)	UIW 37–26
4	10:55	NSU	Scooter Adams 10-yard rush (Eddie Godina kick) (4 plays, 75 yards, 0:52)	UIW 37–33
4	07:22	NSU	Javon Antonio 14-yard pass from Bryce Rivers (Eddie Godina kick) (7 plays, 66 yards, 2:10)	NSU 40–37
4	04:16	UIW	Carson Mohr 37-yard field goal (9 plays, 68 yards, 2:56)	TIE 40–40
4	01:28	NSU	Scooter Adams 9-yard rush (Eddie Godina PAT blocked) (10 plays, 76 yards, 2:42)	NSU 46–40
4	00:55	UIW	Darion Chafin 34-yard pass from Cameron Ward (Carson Mohr kick) (3 plays, 48 yards, 0:22)	UIW 47–46
4	00:00	NSU	Eddie Godina 32-yard field goal (4 plays, 58 yards, 0:55)	NSU 49–47

Statistics	Northwestern State	Incarnate Word
First downs	36	29
Total yards	707	627
Rushing yards	230	196
Passing yards	477	431
Turnovers	2	3
Time of possession	30:20	29:40

Team	Category	Player	Statistics
Northwestern State	Passing	Bryce Rivers	34/61, 477 yards, 3 TDs, 1 INT
Northwestern State	Rushing	Scooter Adams	20 carries, 208 yards, 3 TDs
Northwestern State	Receiving	Javon Antonio	11 receptions, 192 yards, 2 TDs
Incarnate Word	Passing	Cam Ward	33/59, 431 yards, 2 TDs, 1 INT
Incarnate Word	Rushing	Kevin Brown	19 carries, 160 yards, 3 TDs
Incarnate Word	Receiving	Robert Ferrel	7 receptions, 144 yards, 1 TD

== Roster ==
2020 Northwestern State Demons football team roster
Players
Coaches
Offense

Pos.	#	Name	Class
QB	2	Kaleb Fletcher	Jr
WR	6	Robbie Williams, III	Fr
QB	7	Bryce Rivers	Jr
WR	8	Levar Gumms	Jr
WR	11	Tanner Ash	Jr
QB	13	Zachary Clement	Fr
WR	14	Coby McGee	Jr
WR	15	Jalen Willis	So
TE	17	David Fitzwater	Sr
WR	18	Kendrick Price	Sr
WR	19	Curtis Williams	So
RB	20	Trevor Morgan	Jr
RB	27	Erik Hart	Fr
OL	56	Kenny Sheldon	Jr
OL	61	Spencer Cody	Fr
OL	62	Jake Gore	Jr
OL	63	Alyzcha Ulufale-Hentz	So
OL	64	Reggie Young	So
OL	67	Jordan Cooper	Fr
OL	69	Jakob Sell	Jr
OL	72	Khalil Corbett-Canada	Jr
OL	78	Cody Coleman	Fr
OL	79	Clay Cotten	Fr
TE	82	Aaron Howell	So
WR	83	Jacob Sylvia	Fr
WR	84	Gavin Landry	Sr
WR	85	Gabriel Ernest	So
WR	86	Patrick Heard	So
WR	89	McKane Kinchen	Jr
RB		Scooter Adams	Jr
WR		Marquise Bridges	Jr
OL		Logan Canerdy	Jr
WR		Andy Pierre-Antonie	Jr

Defense

Pos.	#	Name	Class
S	1	Tobias Williams	So
CB	3	Shemar Bartholomew	Jr
S	4	Cedric Anderson	So
ILB	5	Jalen Angelle	So
CB	6	Kunta Hester	Fr
LB	10	Ja'Quay Pough	Sr
OLB	11	Jomard Valsin	Jr
CB	15	William Hooper	Jr
CB	16	Fred Lee	So
ILB	21	Jared Pedraza	Fr
ILB	22	Adrion Robertson	Sr
S	25	Hayden Bourgeois	Sr
CB	26	Keldrick Ward	Jr
S	29	Trey Williams	Jr
ILB	30	Bishop Breaux	So
CB	31	Jalen Garrison	So
OLB	32	Landon King	Jr
ILB	33	Isaiah Longino	Jr
OLB	35	Kyle Moore	Sr
OLB	39	Chandler Moncrief	So
S	40	T. K. Evans	So
ILB	43	Blake Stephenson	Sr
S	45	Tyson Ford	Fr
CB	46	Ray Johnson	Fr
DL	47	Rashaud Powell	Jr
DE	48	Johnathan Daigle	Fr
S	49	Keenan Leechman	So
ILB	50	Ricky Chatman	Sr
DT	51	Nathalohn Nanai	Jr
OLB	54	Matthew Pajinag	Fr
DL	71	Devin Gabriel	So
DE	90	Darius Whitfield	Sr
DE	93	Ty Cormier	So
DT/DE	96	Jabralen Yarber	So
DE	97	John-Alex Perkins	Jr
DT	98	Tyrus Butler	Sr
NT	99	Damien Thomas	Sr
S		P. J. Herrington	Jr

Special teams

Pos.	#	Name	Class
K	37	Daniel Justino	Sr
K/P	43	Scotty Roblow	Fr
LS	55	Evan Gibson	So
K		Eddie Godina	Jr

Head coach

- Brad Laird (Northwestern State)

Coordinators/assistant coaches

- Brad Smiley (Baylor)
  Offensive coordinator/te
- Mike Lucas (Liberty)
  Defensive coordinator/ilb
- De'Von Lockett (Northwestern State)
  Defensive backs
- Ledell Love (Texas Tech)
  Defensive linemen
- Jake Olsen (Valley City State)
  Recruiting coordinator/olb
- J Pond (Texas A&M)
  Video coordinator/ol
- Anthony Scelfo (Tulane)
  Quarterbacks
- Alvin Slaughter (Clarion)
  Wide receivers

Legend

- (C) Team captain
- (S) Suspended
- (I) Ineligible
- Injured
- Redshirt

Roster
Last update: March 23, 2020
