= 2020 Nicholls Colonels football team =

American college football season

2020 Nicholls Colonels football
- Conference: Southland Conference

Ranking
- STATS: No. 23
- FCS Coaches: No. 20
- Record: 4–3 (3–3 Southland)
- Head coach: Tim Rebowe (6th season)
- Offensive coordinator: Rob Christophel (6th season)
- Offensive scheme: Spread
- Defensive coordinator: Tommy Rybacki (6th season)
- Base defense: Multiple 4–3
- Home stadium: Manning Field at John L. Guidry Stadium

2020 Southland Conference football standings
	Conf.			Overall
Team	W		L	W		L
No. 1 Sam Houston State $^	6	–	0	10	–	0
No. 20 Southeastern Louisiana	4	–	2	4	–	3
No. 23 Nicholls	3	–	3	4	–	3
Incarnate Word	3	–	3	3	–	3
Lamar	2	–	4	2	–	4
McNeese State*	2	–	4	3	–	4
Northwestern State	1	–	5	1	–	5
$ – Conference champion; ^ – FCS playoff participant; * – Ineligible for FCS postseason play due to NCAA sanctions Note: Abilene Christian, Central Arkansas, Houston Baptist, and Stephen F. Austin played only in the fall and opted out of the spring season.; Rankings from STATS Poll

The 2020 Nicholls State Colonels football team represented Nicholls State University as a member of the Southland Conference during the 2020–21 NCAA Division I FCS football season. Led by sixth-year head coach Tim Rebowe, the Colonels compiled an overall record of 4–3 with a mark of 3–3 in conference play, tying for third place in the Southland. Nicholls State played home games at John L. Guidry Stadium in Thibodaux, Louisiana.

Shortly before the season was to commence, the Southland Conference canceled their fall sports, with the hope that all sports would be playable in Spring 2021. The Colonels started their spring season on February 19, 2021.

== Preseason ==
=== Recruiting class ===
College recruiting information (2020)
Name	Hometown	School	Height	Weight	Commit date
Trevor Allemand; Defensive Line	Raceland, LA	Central Lafourche HS	6 ft 3 in (1.91 m)	230 lb (100 kg)	Feb 5, 2020
Trevor Allemand; Defensive Line	Recruit ratings: Scout: Rivals: 247Sports: ESPN:				
Javin Augillard; Wide Receiver	St. Amant, LA	St. Amant HS	6 ft 3 in (1.91 m)	180 lb (82 kg)	Feb 5, 2020
Javin Augillard; Wide Receiver	Recruit ratings: Scout: Rivals: 247Sports: ESPN:				
Zach Bernard; Defensive Line	Mandeville, LA	Lakeshore HS	6 ft 2 in (1.88 m)	280 lb (130 kg)	Feb 5, 2020
Zach Bernard; Defensive Line	Recruit ratings: Scout: Rivals: 247Sports: ESPN:				
Tyreke Boyd; Defensive Back	Lafayette, LA	Ovey Comeaux HS	5 ft 10 in (1.78 m)	180 lb (82 kg)	Feb 5, 2020
Tyreke Boyd; Defensive Back	Recruit ratings: Scout: Rivals: 247Sports: ESPN:				
Tevin Bush; Wide Receiver	New Orleans, LA	Landy–Walker Prep; West Virginia	5 ft 7 in (1.70 m)	170 lb (77 kg)	Dec 18, 2019
Tevin Bush; Wide Receiver	Recruit ratings: Scout: Rivals: 247Sports: ESPN:				
Pig Cage; Defensive Back	Kenner, LA	Archbishop Rummel HS	5 ft 11 in (1.80 m)	200 lb (91 kg)	Feb 5, 2020
Pig Cage; Defensive Back	Recruit ratings: Scout: Rivals: 247Sports: ESPN:				
Choncee Crum; Linebacker	New Orleans, LA	St. Augustine HS	6 ft 0 in (1.83 m)	200 lb (91 kg)	Feb 5, 2020
Choncee Crum; Linebacker	Recruit ratings: Scout: Rivals: 247Sports: ESPN:				
Ty'Ree Evans; Linebacker	Waynesboro, MS	Wayne County HS; Southern Miss	6 ft 2 in (1.88 m)	205 lb (93 kg)	Feb 5, 2020
Ty'Ree Evans; Linebacker	Recruit ratings: Scout: Rivals: 247Sports: ESPN:				
Chei Hill; Defensive Lineman	Miami, FL	South Dade HS; East Tennessee State; Jones County JC	6 ft 1 in (1.85 m)	245 lb (111 kg)	Feb 5, 2020
Chei Hill; Defensive Lineman	Recruit ratings: Scout: Rivals: 247Sports: ESPN:				
Brandon James; Defensive Back	Marrero, LA	John Ehret HS	5 ft 10 in (1.78 m)	180 lb (82 kg)	Feb 5, 2020
Brandon James; Defensive Back	Recruit ratings: Scout: Rivals: 247Sports: ESPN:				
Jamiran James; Defensive Line	New Orleans, LA	De La Salle HS; Tulane	6 ft 1 in (1.85 m)	280 lb (130 kg)	Dec 18, 2019
Jamiran James; Defensive Line	Recruit ratings: Scout: Rivals: 247Sports: ESPN:				
Devonta Jason; Wide Receiver	New Orleans, LA	Landry–Walker Prep; Mississippi State	6 ft 3 in (1.91 m)	220 lb (100 kg)	Dec 18, 2019
Devonta Jason; Wide Receiver	Recruit ratings: Scout: Rivals: 247Sports: ESPN:				
Johmel Jolla Jr. Linebacker	Geismar, LA	Dutchtown HS	6 ft 0 in (1.83 m)	200 lb (91 kg)	Dec 18, 2019
Johmel Jolla Jr. Linebacker	Recruit ratings: Scout: Rivals: 247Sports: ESPN:				
Kenan Jones; Defensive Back	Berwick, LA	Berwick HS; LSU	6 ft 3 in (1.91 m)	215 lb (98 kg)	Feb 5, 2020
Kenan Jones; Defensive Back	Recruit ratings: Scout: Rivals: 247Sports: ESPN:				
DeAndre Keller; Defensive Lineman	Vacherie, LA	St. James HS	6 ft 3 in (1.91 m)	270 lb (120 kg)	Feb 5, 2020
DeAndre Keller; Defensive Lineman	Recruit ratings: Scout: Rivals: 247Sports: ESPN:				
Leonard Kelly; Quarterback	New Orleans, LA	Edna Karr HS	6 ft 1 in (1.85 m)	195 lb (88 kg)	Feb 5, 2020
Leonard Kelly; Quarterback	Recruit ratings: Scout: Rivals: 247Sports: ESPN:				
Lee Negrotto; Tight End	Pass Christian, MS	St. Stanislaus HS	6 ft 3 in (1.91 m)	235 lb (107 kg)	Feb 5, 2020
Lee Negrotto; Tight End	Recruit ratings: Scout: Rivals: 247Sports: ESPN:				
Evan Roussel; Offensive Lineman	Gramercy, LA	St. Charles Catholic HS	6 ft 2 in (1.88 m)	280 lb (130 kg)	Dec 18, 2019
Evan Roussel; Offensive Lineman	Recruit ratings: Scout: Rivals: 247Sports: ESPN:				
Hayden Shaheen; Linebacker	Baton Rouge, LA	Catholic HS	6 ft 0 in (1.83 m)	215 lb (98 kg)	Feb 5, 2020
Hayden Shaheen; Linebacker	Recruit ratings: Scout: Rivals: 247Sports: ESPN:				
Shamar Smith; Athlete	St. James, LA	St. James HS	6 ft 1 in (1.85 m)	190 lb (86 kg)	Feb 5, 2020
Shamar Smith; Athlete	Recruit ratings: Scout: Rivals: 247Sports: ESPN:				
Baylee Trusty; Offensive Lineman	Grenada, MS	Grenada HS; East Mississippi CC	6 ft 3 in (1.91 m)	295 lb (134 kg)	Dec 18, 2019
Baylee Trusty; Offensive Lineman	Recruit ratings: Scout: Rivals: 247Sports: ESPN:				
Corey Warren Jr. Running Back	Pearl River, LA	Pearl River HS	5 ft 10 in (1.78 m)	225 lb (102 kg)	Dec 18, 2019
Corey Warren Jr. Running Back	Recruit ratings: Scout: Rivals: 247Sports: ESPN:				
Logan Wilcox; Tight End	Raceland, LA	Central Lafourche HS	6 ft 3 in (1.91 m)	230 lb (100 kg)	Feb 5, 2020
Logan Wilcox; Tight End	Recruit ratings: Scout: Rivals: 247Sports: ESPN:				
Jai Williams; Running Back	Plattenville, LA	Ascension Catholic HS	5 ft 10 in (1.78 m)	180 lb (82 kg)	Feb 5, 2020
Jai Williams; Running Back	Recruit ratings: Scout: Rivals: 247Sports: ESPN:				
Keontae Williams; Defensive Back	Scott, LA	Acadiana HS	6 ft 0 in (1.83 m)	190 lb (86 kg)	Feb 5, 2020
Keontae Williams; Defensive Back	Recruit ratings: Scout: Rivals: 247Sports: ESPN:				
Malik Woodery; Defensive Back	New Orleans, LA	Archbishop Rummel HS	6 ft 0 in (1.83 m)	180 lb (82 kg)	Feb 5, 2020
Malik Woodery; Defensive Back	Recruit ratings: Scout: Rivals: 247Sports: ESPN:				

=== Preseason poll ===
The Southland Conference released their spring preseason poll in January 2021. The Colonels were picked to finish first in the conference. In addition, eight Colonels were chosen to the Preseason All-Southland Team

=== Preseason All–Southland Teams ===
Offense

1st Team

- Julien Gums – Running Back, JR
- Dai'Jean Dixon – Wide Receiver, SR
- P. J. Burkhalter – Offensive Lineman, RS-SR
- Jair Joseph – Offensive Lineman, SR

2nd Team

- Mikhail Hill – Offensive Lineman, RS-JR
- Jeremiah James – Offensive Lineman, RS-SO

Defense

1st Team

- Kevin Moore III – Defensive Back, SR

2nd Team

- Evan Veron – Linebacker, SR

== Schedule ==
Date	Time	Opponent	Rank	Site	TV	Result	Attendance
February 19	6:00 p.m.	Lincoln (MO)*	No. 14	Manning Field at John L. Guidry Stadium; Thibodaux, LA	CST	W 87–3	3,000
February 27	3:00 p.m.	Lamar	No. 9	Manning Field at John L. Guidry Stadium; Thibodaux, LA	ESPN+	W 55–0	3,000
March 6	6:00 p.m.	at Northwestern State	No. 7	Harry Turpin Stadium; Natchitoches, LA (NSU Challenge)	ESPN+	W 31–24	4,305
March 13	12:00 p.m.	at No. 12 Sam Houston State	No. 7	Bowers Stadium; Huntsville, TX	ESPN+	L 17–71	2,103
March 27	11:00 a.m.	No. 13 Incarnate Word	No. 17	Manning Field at John L. Guidry Stadium; Thibodaux, LA	ESPN+	W 75–45	4,236
April 3	12:00 p.m.	at McNeese State	No. 13	Cowboy Stadium; Lake Charles, LA	CST	L 31–43	5,289
April 10	3:00 p.m.	No. 23 Southeastern Louisiana	No. 18	Manning Field at John L. Guidry Stadium; Thibodaux, LA (River Bell Classic)	CST	L 45–52	5,122
*Non-conference game; Rankings from STATS Poll released prior to the game; All times are in Central time

== Game summaries ==
=== Lincoln ===
Lincoln at Nicholls

Team	1	2	3	4	Total
Blue Tigers	0	0	3	0	3
• No. 14 (FCS) Colonels	13	33	20	21	87

- Date: February 19, 2021
- Location: Manning Field at John L. Guidry Stadium
  Thibodaux, LA
- Game start: 6:06 p.m. CST
- Elapsed time: 2 hours and 49 minutes
- Game attendance: 3,000
- Game weather: 47 °F (8 °C) • Weather: Cold • Wind: 10 MPH
- Referee: Ed Bourgeois
- Television network: CST

Scoring summary
1	11:01	NICH	Lindsey Scott Jr. 13-yard rush (Gavin Lasseigne PAT failed) (6 plays, 51 yards, 1:51)	NICH 6–0
1	08:13	NICH	Tevin Bush 20-yard rush (Gavin Lasseigne kick) (4 plays, 54 yards, 1:15)	NICH 13–0
2	13:03	NICH	Tevin Bush 26-yard pass from Lindsey Scott Jr. (Gavin Lasseigne kick)br/>(3 plays, 45 yards, 1:11)	NICH 20–0
2	12:51	NICH	Dontaze Costly 17-yard pass from Kohen Granier (Gavin Lasseigne PAT failed) (1 play, 17 yards, 0:06)	NICH 26–0
2	09:45	NICH	Dai'Jean Dixon 18-yard pass from Kohen Granier (Gunnar Jones kick) (3 play, 33 yards, 1:06)	NICH 33–0
2	09:24	NICH	Dellary Oubre 35-yard fumble returned (Gunnar Jones PAT failed) (2 plays, -5 yards, 0:14)	NICH 39–0
2	02:05	NICH	Julien Gums 1-yard rush (Gavin Lasseigne kick) (11 plays, 52 yards, 4:59)	NICH 46–0
3	12:49	NICH	Dontaze Costly 21-yard pass from Lindsey Scott Jr. (Gavin Lasseigne PAT failed) (5 plays, 60 yards, 2:07)	NICH 52–0
3	07:17	LIN	Javier Moreno 32-yard field goal (4 plays, -6 yards, 1:39)	NICH 52–3
3	04:23	NICH	Ronnie Jackson 3-yard rush (Gavin Lasseigne kick) (6 plays, 68 yards, 2:46)	NICH 59–3
3	01:26	NICH	Troy Hurst 38-yard rush (Gavin Lasseigne kick) (2 plays, 47 yards, 0:40)	NICH 66–3
4	13:43	NICH	Colin Guggenheim 2-yard rush (Gavin Lasseigne kick) (4 plays, 20 yards, 1:58)	NICH 73–3
4	12:00	NICH	Marquese Albert 7-yard rush (Gavin Lasseigne kick) (2 plays, 7 yards, 0:51)	NICH 80–3
4	06:03	NICH	Donnell Adair 39-yard rush (Gavin Lasseigne kick) (1 play, 39 yards, 0:12	NICH 87–3

Statistics	Lincoln	Nicholls
First downs	6	26
Total yards	110	477
Rushing yards	90	249
Passing yards	20	228
Turnovers	6	0
Time of possession	32:38	27:22

Team	Category	Player	Statistics
Lincoln	Passing	Desmond Hunter	9/13, 11 yards, 1 INT
Lincoln	Rushing	Tori Hicks	16 carries, 71 yards
Lincoln	Receiving	Chrisshun Robinson	1 reception, 7 yards
Nicholls	Passing	Lindsey Scott Jr.	12/14, 153 yards, 2 TDs
Nicholls	Rushing	Julien Gums	11 carries, 61 yards, 1 TD
Nicholls	Receiving	Dai'Jean Dixon	5 receptions, 80 yards, 1 TD

=== Lamar ===
Lamar at Nicholls

Team	1	2	3	4	Total
Cardinals	0	0	0	0	0
• No. 9 Colonels	13	21	21	0	55

- Date: February 27, 2021
- Location: Manning Field at John L. Guidry Stadium
  Thibodaux, LA
- Game start: 3:06 p.m. CST
- Elapsed time: 2 hours and 55 minutes
- Game attendance: 3,000
- Game weather: 80 °F (27 °C) • Weather: Cloudy • Wind: SSE 17 MPH
- Referee: Scott Hardin
- Television network: ESPN+

Scoring summary
1	11:38	NICH	Lindsey Scott Jr. 33-yard rush (Gavin Lasseigne PAT failed) (9 plays, 75 yards, 3:22)	NICH 6–0
1	07:08	NICH	K. J. Franklin 23-yard pass from Lindsey Scott Jr. (Gavin Lasseigne kick) (5 plays, 66 yards, 1:57)	NICH 13–0
2	13:34	NICH	Troy Hurst 28-yard pass from Lindsey Scott Jr. (Gavin Lasseigne kick)br/>(10 plays, 85 yards, 3:51)	NICH 20–0
2	05:50	NICH	Julien Gums 2-yard rush (Gavin Lasseigne kick) (6 plays, 72 yards, 2:34)	NICH 27–0
2	00:27	NICH	Lindsey Scott Jr. 7-yard rush (Gavin Lasseigne kick) (11 plays, 61 yards, 2:35)	NICH 34–0
3	10:59	NICH	Dontaze Costly 45-yard pass from Lindsey Scott Jr. (Gavin Lasseigne kick) (4 plays, 63 yards, 1:55)	NICH 41–0
3	06:47	NICH	Lindsey Scott Jr. 5-yard rush (Gavin Lasseigne kick) (6 plays, 58 yards, 2:28)	NICH 48–0
3	02:41	NICH	John Carrington III 4-yard rush (Gavin Lasseigne kick) (5 plays, 65 yards, 1:52)	NICH 55–0

Statistics	Lamar	Nicholls
First downs	6	31
Total yards	91	639
Rushing yards	37	392
Passing yards	54	247
Turnovers	0	0
Time of possession	30:34	29:26

Team	Category	Player	Statistics
Lamar	Passing	Jalen Dummett	9/11, 40 yards
Lamar	Rushing	Jaylen Jackson	8 carries, 19 yards
Lamar	Receiving	Marcellus Johnson	3 receptions, 14 yards
Nicholls	Passing	Lindsey Scott Jr.	16/21, 232 yards, 3 TDs
Nicholls	Rushing	Lindsey Scott Jr.	10 carries, 108 yards, 3 TDs
Nicholls	Receiving	K. J. Franklin	5 receptions, 65 yards, 1 TD

=== At Northwestern State ===
Nicholls at Northwestern State

Team	1	2	3	4	Total
• No. 7 Colonels	14	7	3	7	31
Demons	7	0	10	7	24

- Date: February 19, 2021
- Location: Harry Turpin Stadium
  Natchitoches, LA
- Game start: 6:00 p.m. CST
- Elapsed time: 3 hours and 37 minutes
- Game attendance: 4,305
- Game weather: 58 °F (14 °C) • Weather: Clear
- Television network: ESPN+

Scoring summary
1	08:10	NICH	Julien Gums 5-yard rush (Gavin Lasseigne kick) (13 plays, 66 yards, 5:59)	NICH 7–0
1	06:24	NSU	Scooter Adams 58-yard rush (Eddie Godina kick) (5 plays, 78 yards, 1:40)	TIE 7–7
1	02:17	NICH	Dai'Jean Dixon 6-yard pass from Lindsey Scott Jr. (Gavin Lasseigne kick)br/>(9 plays, 69 yards, 4:01)	NICH 14–7
2	14:07	NICH	Dai'Jean Dixon 1-yard pass from Lindsey Scott Jr. (Gavin Lasseigne kick) (4 play, 69 yards, 0:56)	NICH 21–7
3	09:03	NSU	Aubrey Scott 80-yard rush (Eddie Godina kick) (1 play, 80 yards, 0:13)	NICH 21–14
3	04:04	NICH	Gavin Lasseigne 30-yard field goal (10 plays, 58 yards, 4:51)	NICH 24–14
3	01:01	NSU	Eddie Godina 25-yard field goal (8 plays, 32 yards, 2:50)	NICH 24–17
4	14:45	NICH	David Robertson Jr. 42-yard pass from Lindsey Scott Jr. (Gavin Lasseigne kick) (4 plays, 76 yards, 1:10)	NICH 31–17
4	05:40	NSU	Gavin Landry 13-yard pass from Kaleb Fletcher (Eddie Godina kick) (9 plays, 76 yards, 2:26)	NICH 31–24

Statistics	Nicholls	Northwestern State
First downs	29	12
Total yards	545	304
Rushing yards	246	237
Passing yards	299	67
Turnovers	2	0
Time of possession	39:31	20:29

Team	Category	Player	Statistics
Nicholls	Passing	Lindsey Scott Jr.	21/33, 229 yards, 3 TDs, 1 INT
Nicholls	Rushing	Julien Gums	36 carries, 156 yards, 1 TD
Nicholls	Receiving	Dai'Jean Dixon	7 receptions, 115 yards, 2 TDs
Northwestern State	Passing	Kaleb Fletcher	8/17, 49 yards, 1 TD
Northwestern State	Rushing	Aubrey Scott	9 carries, 119 yards, 1 TD
Northwestern State	Receiving	Gavin Landry	2 receptions, 19 yards, 1 TD

=== At Sam Houston State ===
Nicholls at Sam Houston State

Team	1	2	3	4	Total
No. 7 Colonels	7	3	7	0	17
• No. 12 Bearkats	7	23	20	21	71

- Date: March 13, 2021
- Location: Bowers Stadium
  Huntsville, TX
- Game start: 12:05 p.m. CST
- Elapsed time: 3 hours and 34 minutes
- Game attendance: 2,103
- Game weather: 75 °F (24 °C) • Weather: Overcast, Humid • Wind: 10 S MPH
- Referee: Christopher Watson
- Television network: ESPN+

Scoring summary
1	11:36	NICH	Dai'Jean Dixon 14-yard pass from Lindsey Scott Jr. (Gavin Lasseigne kick) (2 plays, 21 yards, 0:40)	NICH 7–0
1	01:26	SHSU	Jequez Ezzard 14-yard pass from Eric Schmid (Seth Morgan kick) (7 plays, 70 yards, 3:01)	TIE 7–7
2	12:32	SHSU	Seth Morgan 24-yard field goal (5 plays, 74 yards, 2:28)	SHSU 10–7
2	08:53	SHSU	Noah Smith 29-yard pass from Eric Schmid (Seth Morgan kick) (6 plays, 80 yards, 2:14)	SHSU 17–7
2	08:44	SHSU	Jahari Kay 24-yard interception returned (Seth Morgan kick) (1 play, 0 yards, 0:09)	SHSU 24–7
2	02:34	SHSU	Jequez Ezzard 55-yard pass from Eric Schmid (two-point pass conversion attempt failed) (5 plays, 80 yards, 2:02)	SHSU 30–7
2	00:00	NICH	Gavin Lasseigne 29-yard field goal (7 plays, 55 yards, 0:36)	SHSU 30–10
3	11:37	SHSU	Dewaylon Ingram 5-yard pass from Eric Schmid (Seth Morgan PAT failed) (9 plays, 75 yards, 3:26)	SHSU 36–10
3	10:50	SHSU	Noah Smith 6-yard pass from Eric Schmid (Seth Morgan kick) (4 plays, 18 yards, 0:44)	SHSU 43–10
3	07:00	SHSU	Trevor Williams 79-yard fumble returned (Seth Morgan kick) (11 plays, 58 yards, 3:45)	SHSU 50–10
3	00:03	NICH	Dai'Jean Dixon 5-yard rush (Gavin Lasseigne kick) (6 plays, 32 yards, 2:13)	SHSU 50–17
4	11:23	SHSU	Dee Bowens 10-yard pass from Eric Schmid (Seth Morgan kick) (7 plays, 75 yards, 3:40)	SHSU 57–17
4	08:22	SHSU	Kyran Jackson 2-yard rush (Seth Morgan kick) (6 plays, 24 yards, 2:51)	SHSU 64–17
4	00:48	SHSU	Mike Dare 4-yard rush (Seth Morgan kick) (7 plays, 67 yards, 4:12)	SHSU 71–17

Statistics	Nicholls	Sam Houston State
First downs	19	23
Total yards	337	556
Rushing yards	118	190
Passing yards	219	366
Turnovers	4	2
Time of possession	28:54	31:06

Team	Category	Player	Statistics
Nicholls	Passing	Lindsey Scott Jr	14/35, 186 yards, 1 TD, 1 INT
Nicholls	Rushing	Dontaze Costly	3 carries, 41 yards
Nicholls	Receiving	Dai'Jean Dixon	5 receptions, 83 yards, 1 TD
Sam Houston State	Passing	Eric Schmid	21/32, 366 yards, 6 TDs, 2 INTs
Sam Houston State	Rushing	Daryon Triche	5 carries, 60 yards
Sam Houston State	Receiving	Jequez Ezzard	3 receptions, 139 yards, 2 TDs

=== Incarnate Word ===
Incarnate Word at Nicholls

Team	1	2	3	4	Total
No. 13 Cardinals	14	10	7	14	45
• No. 17 Colonels	20	35	13	7	75

- Date: March 27, 2021
- Location: Manning Field at John L. Guidry Stadium
  Thibodaux, LA
- Game start: 11:05 a.m. CDT
- Elapsed time: 3 hours and 43 minutes
- Game attendance: 4,236
- Game weather: 83 °F (28 °C) • Weather: Overcast • Wind: S 16 MPH
- Referee: Dan Lewis
- TV announcers (ESPN+): John Liddle (play-by-play), Gary Reasons (analyst), Lainie Fritz (sideline)

Scoring summary
1	12:56	NICH	Dontaze Costly 22-yard pass from Lindsey Scott Jr. (Gavin Lasseigne kick) (6 plays, 75 yards, 2:04)	NICH 7–0
1	09:43	UIW	Mark Sullivan 4-yard pass from Cam Ward (Carson Mohr kick) (9 plays, 68 yards, 3:09)	TIE 7–7
1	07:47	NICH	Dontaze Costly 48-yard pass from Lindsey Scott Jr. (Gavin Lasseigne kick) (5 plays, 75 yards, 1:56)	NICH 14–7
1	05:54	UIW	Kevin Brown 22-yard pass from Cameron Ward (Carson Mohr kick) (5 plays, 85 yards, 1:47)	TIE 14–14
1	00:40	NICH	John Carrington III 7-yard rush (Gavin Lasseigne PAT failed) (12 plays, 75 yards, 5:14)	NICH 20–14
2	13:36	UIW	Carson Mohr 26-yard field goal (8 plays, 50 yards, 1:57)	NICH 20–17
2	13:22	NICH	Dontaze Costly 90-yard kickoff returned (Gavin Lasseigne kick) (0 plays, 0 yards, 0:00)	NICH 27–17
2	10:32	UIW	Robert Ferrel 6-yard pass from Cameron Ward (Carson Mohr kick) (10 plays, 65 yards, 2:50)	NICH 27–24
2	09:40	NICH	Lindsey Scott Jr. 19-yard rush (Gavin Lasseigne kick) (3 plays, 80 yards, 0:51)	NICH 34–24
2	07:46	NICH	John Carrington III 14-yard rush (Gavin Lasseigne kick) (3 plays, 40 yards, 1:13)	NICH 41–24
2	05:00	NICH	Al'Dontre Davis 11-yard pass from Lindsey Scott Jr. (Gavin Lasseigne kick) (3 plays, 36 yards, 1:10)	NICH 48–24
2	00:30	NICH	K. J. Franklin 16-yard pass from Lindsey Scott Jr. (Gavin Lasseigne kick) (6 plays, 63 yards, 0:40)	NICH 55–24
3	10:57	NICH	Ronnie Jackson 2-yard rush (Gavin Lasseigne kick) (7 plays, 70 yards, 2:55)	NICH 62–24
3	09:57	NICH	Gavin Lasseigne 31-yard field goal (4 plays, 1 yard, 0:53)	NICH 65–24
3	05:40	NICH	Gavin Lasseigne 27-yard field goal (4 plays, 3 yards, 1:57)	NICH 68–24
3	02:27	UIW	Jayden Jones 30-yard pass from Cameron Ward (Carson Mohr kick) (9 plays, 75 yards, 3:13)	NICH 68–31
4	10:56	UIW	Robert Ferrel 22-yard pass from Cameron Ward (two-point conversion rush failed) (9 plays, 85 yards, 3:09)	NICH 68–37
4	06:34	UIW	Kaleb Ducros 23-yard pass from Cameron Ward (Cameron Ward two-point conversion pass to Robert Ferrel) (7 plays, 56 yards, 2:14)	NICH 68–45
4	03:29	NICH	Dai'Jean Dixon 3-yard pass from Lindsey Scott Jr. (Gunnar Jones kick) (6 plays, 45 yards, 3:13)	NICH 75–45

Statistics	Incarnate Word	Nicholls
First downs	33	31
Total yards	580	614
Rushing yards	110	350
Passing yards	470	264
Turnovers	3	0
Time of possession	32:17	27:43

Team	Category	Player	Statistics
Incarnate Word	Passing	Cam Ward	39/65, 470 yards, 6 TDs, 1 INT
Incarnate Word	Rushing	Kevin Brown	10 carries, 48 yards
Incarnate Word	Receiving	Robert Ferrel	6 receptions, 104 yards, 2 TDs
Nicholls	Passing	Lindsey Scott Jr.	17/21, 264 yards, 5 TDs
Nicholls	Rushing	John Carrington III	13 carries, 135 yards, 2 TDs
Nicholls	Receiving	K. J. Franklin	5 receptions, 81 yards, 1 TD

=== At McNeese State ===
Nicholls at McNeese State

Team	1	2	3	4	Total
No. 13 Colonels	14	3	7	7	31
• Cowboys	3	21	7	12	43

- Date: April 3, 2021
- Location: Cowboy Stadium
  Lake Charles, LA
- Game start: 12:00 p.m. CDT
- Elapsed time: 3 hours and 40 minutes
- Game attendance: 5,289
- Referee: Vidal Jones
- Television network: CST

Scoring summary
1	07:28	NICH	Dontaze Costly 10-yard pass from Lindsey Scott Jr. (Gavin Lasseigne kick) (11 plays, 69 yards, 4:08)	NICH 7–0
1	03:22	MCNS	Jacob Abel 42-yard field goal (4 plays, 3 yards, 1:22)	NICH 7–3
1	00:08	NICH	Dai'Jean Dixon 2-yard pass from Lindsey Scott Jr. (Gavin Lasseigne kick)br/>(9 plays, 75 yards, 3:14)	NICH 14–3
2	13:43	MCNS	Mason Pierce 4-yard pass from Cody Orgeron (Jacob Abel kick) (4 play, 65 yards, 0:32)	NICH 14–10
2	07:20	MCNS	Walker Wood 4-yard rush (Jacob Abel kick) (7 plays, 86 yards, 2:59)	MCNS 17–14
2	05:47	MCNS	Mason Pierce 85-yard pass from Cody Orgeron (Jacob Abel kick) (1 play, 85 yards, 0:13)	MCNS 24–14
2	01:23	NICH	Gavin Lasseigne 26-yard field goal (11 plays, 66 yards, 4:24)	MCNS 24–17
3	12:08	MCNS	Joshua Matthews 28-yard pass from Cody Orgeron (Jacob Abel kick) (8 plays, 79 yards, 2:52)	MCNS 31–17
3	05:43	NICH	Julien Gums 8-yard rush (Gavin Lasseigne kick) (16 plays, 75 yards, 6:25)	NICH 31–24
4	12:48	MCNS	Joshua Matthews 13-yard pass from Cody Orgeron (Jacob Abel PAT failed) (2 plays, 19 yards, 0:34)	MCNS 37–24
4	11:17	NICH	Dai'Jean Dixon 11-yard pass from Lindsey Scott Jr. (Gavin Lasseigne kick) (8 plays, 75 yards, 1:31)	MCNS 37–31
4	10:21	MCNS	Deonta McMahon 67-yard rush (two-point conversion pass failed) (3 plays, 75 yards, 0:50)	MCNS 43–31

Statistics	Nicholls	McNeese State
First downs	29	21
Total yards	562	541
Rushing yards	273	187
Passing yards	289	354
Turnovers	3	2
Time of possession	35:26	24:34

Team	Category	Player	Statistics
Nicholls	Passing	Lindsey Scott Jr.	26/53, 289 yards, 3 TDs, 1 INT
Nicholls	Rushing	Lindsey Scott Jr.	28 carries, 137 yards
Nicholls	Receiving	K. J. Franklin	4 receptions, 76 yards
McNeese State	Passing	Cody Orgeron	20/27, 354 yards, 4 TDs
McNeese State	Rushing	Deonta McMahon	11 carries, 111 yards, 1 TD
McNeese State	Receiving	Joshua Matthews	7 receptions, 147 yards, 2 TDs

=== Southeastern Louisiana ===
Southeastern Louisiana at Nicholls

Team	1	2	3	4	Total
• No. 23 Lions	14	3	21	14	52
No. 18 Colonels	10	14	6	15	45

- Date: April 10, 2021
- Location: Manning Field at John L. Guidry Stadium
  Thibodaux, LA
- Game start: 3:05 p.m. CDT
- Elapsed time: 3 hours and 34 minutes
- Game attendance: 5,122
- Game weather: 80 °F (27 °C) • Weather: Partly Cloudy • Wind: 5 W MPH
- Referee: Ed Bourgeois
- Television network: ESPN+

Scoring summary
1	10:29	SELA	Cole Kelley 6-yard pass from Terrell Carter (Mateo Rengifo kick) (13 plays, 75 yards, 4:31)	SELA 7–0
1	07:03	NICH	Gavin Lasseigne 31-yard field goal (9 plays, 51 yards, 3:26)	SELA 7–3
1	04:17	SELA	CJ Turner 4-yard pass from Cole Kelley (Mateo Rengifo kick) (7 plays, 75 yards, 2:46)	SELA 14–3
1	01:24	NICH	Julien Gums 1-yard rush (Gavin Lasseigne kick) (7 plays, 91 yards, 2:45)	SELA 14–10
2	08:27	NICH	Julien Gums 4-yard rush (Gavin Lasseigne kick) (11 plays, 80 yards, 3:10)	NICH 17–14
2	02:57	NICH	Julien Gums 3-yard rush (Gavin Lasseigne kick) (8 plays, 59 yards, 3:19)	NICH 24–14
2	00:16	SELA	Mateo Rengifo 21-yard field goal (11 plays, 61 yards, 2:41)	NICH 24–17
3	14:28	SELA	Ferlando Jordan 35-yard interception returned (Mateo Rengifo kick) (3 plays, 2 yards, 0:32)	TIE 24–24
3	09:24	SELA	CJ Turner 8-yard pass from Cole Kelley (Mateo Rengifo kick) (7 plays, 45 yards, 2:54)	SELA 31–24
3	07:32	NICH	Lindsey Scott Jr. 25-yard rush (Gavin Lasseigne PAT blocked) (5 plays, 50 yards, 1:45)	SELA 31–30
3	04:21	SELA	Jack Henderson 23-yard interception returned (Mateo Rengifo kick) (3 plays, 5 yards, 1:15)	SELA 38–30
4	14:55	NICH	Julien Gums 4-yard rush (Lindsey Scott Jr. two-point conversion pass to K. J. Franklin) (11 plays, 75 yards, 4:26)	TIE 38–38
4	13:18	SELA	Marcus Cooper 45-yard pass from Cole Kelley (Mateo Rengifo kick) (5 plays, 65 yards, 1:37)	SELA 45–38
4	08:09	SELA	Nick Kovacs 20-yard pass from Cole Kelley (Mateo Rengifo kick) (10 plays, 39 yards, 5:02)	SELA 52–38
4	01:34	NICH	Tahj Smith 15-yard pass from Lindsey Scott Jr. (Gavin Lasseigne kick) (9 plays, 90 yards, 1:52)	SELA 52–45

Statistics	Southeastern Louisiana	Nicholls
First downs	25	30
Total yards	499	478
Rushing yards	81	217
Passing yards	418	261
Turnovers	0	4
Time of possession	33:36	26:24

Team	Category	Player	Statistics
Southeastern Louisiana	Passing	Cole Kelley	30/41, 391 yards, 4 TDs
Southeastern Louisiana	Rushing	Taron Jones	10 carries, 31 yards
Southeastern Louisiana	Receiving	CJ Turner	11 receptions, 110 yards, 2 TDs
Nicholls	Passing	Lindsey Scott Jr.	19/38, 261 yards, 1 TD, 4 INTs
Nicholls	Rushing	Lindsey Scott Jr.	11 carries, 90 yards, 1 TD
Nicholls	Receiving	Dai'Jean Dixon	5 receptions, 92 yards
