= Zy Alexander =

American gridiron football player (born 2001)

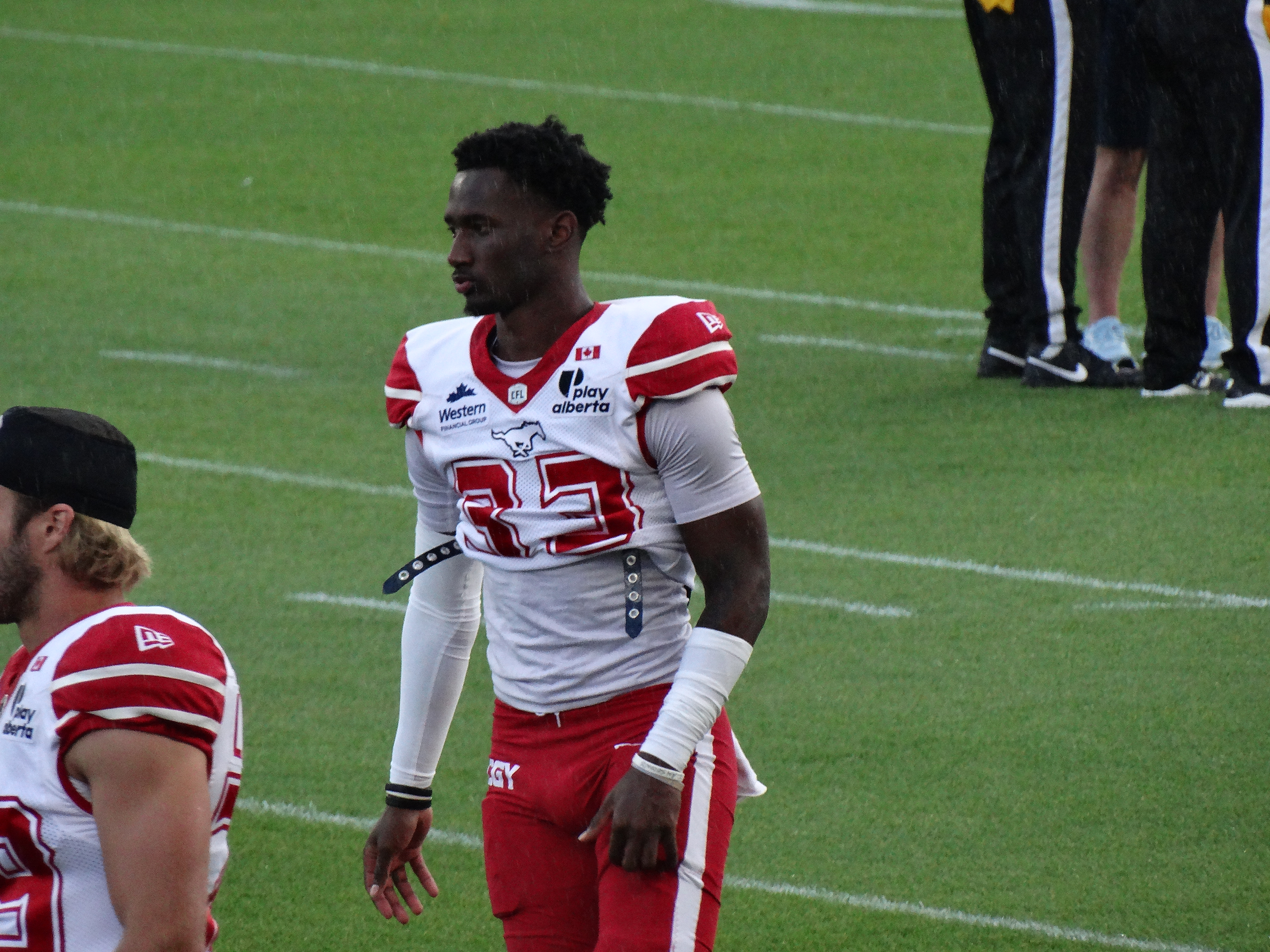
- Alexander with the Calgary Stampeders in 2026

No. 33 – Calgary Stampeders
- Position: Defensive back
- Roster status: Practice roster
- CFL status: American

Personal information
- Born: November 26, 2001 (age 24); Loreauville, Louisiana, U.S.
- Listed height: 6 ft 1 in (1.85 m)
- Listed weight: 187 lb (85 kg)

Career information
- High school: Loreauville
- College: Southeastern Louisiana (2020–2022); LSU (2023–2024)
- NFL draft: 2025: undrafted

Career history
- Seattle Seahawks (2025)*; Buffalo Bills (2025)*; Houston Gamblers (2026)*; Calgary Stampeders (2026–present)
- * Offseason or practice squad member only

Awards and highlights
- 2× First-team All-Southland (2021, 2022)
- Stats at Pro Football Reference

A'Zyrian "Zy" Alexander (born November 26, 2001) is an American professional football defensive back for the Calgary Stampeders of the Canadian Football League (CFL). He played college football for the Southeastern Louisiana Lions and the LSU Tigers.

== Early life ==
Alexander attended Loreauville High School in Loreauville, Louisiana, where he played quarterback and wide receiver on the football team. He committed to play college football for the Southeastern Louisiana Lions.

== College career ==
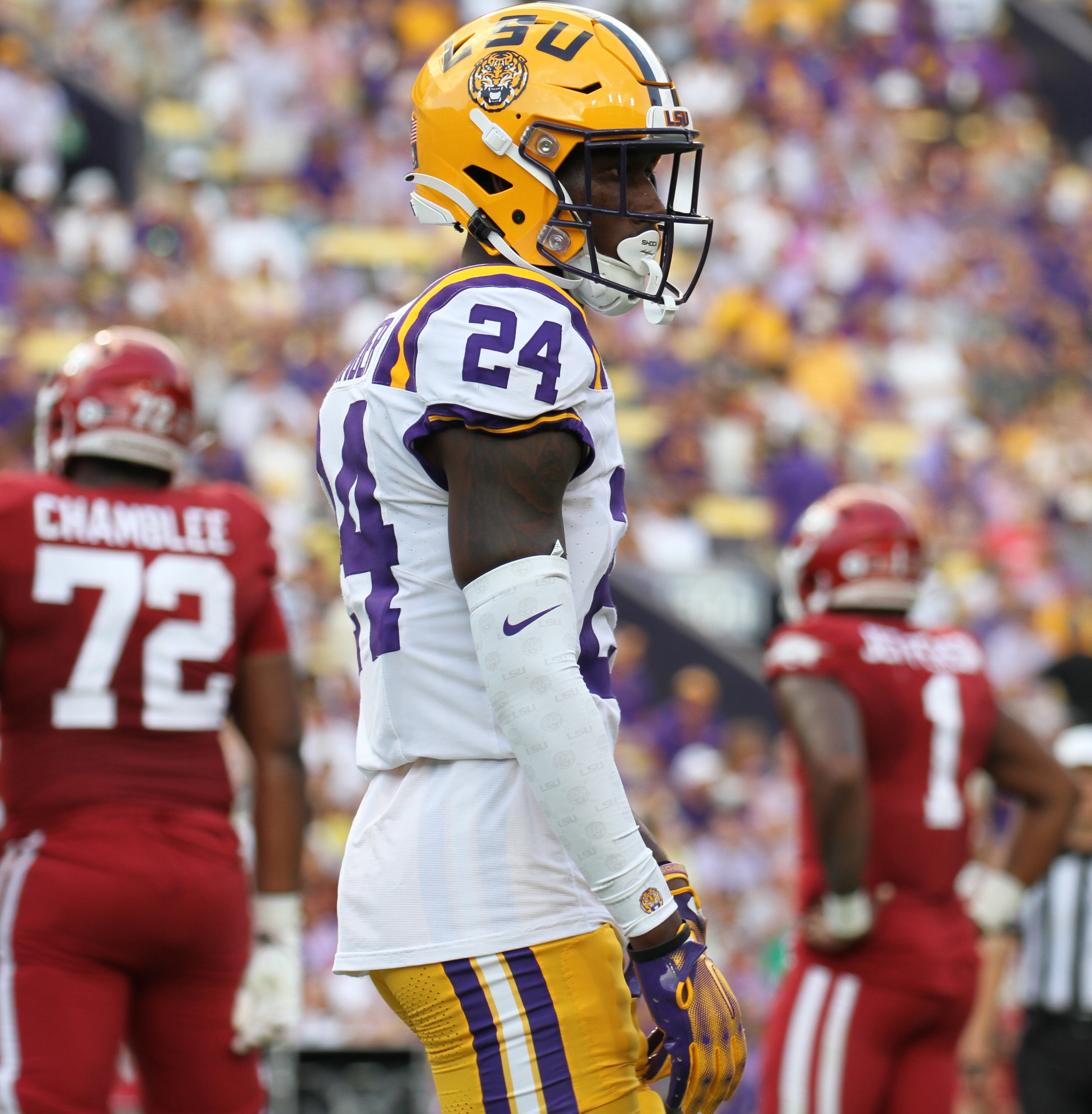
Alexander with the LSU Tigers in 2023

=== Southeastern Louisiana ===
In 2022, Alexander notched 27 tackles, four pass deflections, and a school record six interceptions. During his career at Southeastern Louisiana, he totaled 97 tackles, 12 pass deflections, and nine interceptions, earning FCS All-American honors in 2022 and first-team all-Southland Conference honors in 2021 and 2022. After the 2022 season, Alexander entered his name into the NCAA transfer portal.

=== LSU ===
Alexander transferred to play for the LSU Tigers. In week 7 of the 2023 season, he recorded nine tackles and two pass deflections in a win over Auburn. In week 8, Alexander hauled in an interception before leaving due to an injury in a win over Army. During the 2023 season, he tallied 44 tackles, seven pass deflections, and two interceptions.

== Professional career ==
Pre-draft measurables
Height	Weight	Arm length	Hand span	Wingspan	40-yard dash	10-yard split	20-yard split	Vertical jump	Broad jump
6 ft 1 3/8 in (1.86 m)	187 lb (85 kg)	31 in (0.79 m)	9 1/4 in (0.23 m)	6 ft 5 1/2 in (1.97 m)	4.56 s	1.53 s	2.68 s	31.5 in (0.80 m)	9 ft 8 in (2.95 m)
All values from NFL Combine

=== Seattle Seahawks ===
Alexander signed with the Seattle Seahawks as an undrafted free agent on May 2, 2025. He was waived on July 21.

=== Buffalo Bills ===
On August 20, 2025, Alexander signed with the Buffalo Bills. Alexander was waived by the Bills on August 24.

=== Houston Gamblers ===
On February 1, 2026, Alexander signed with the Houston Gamblers of the United Football League (UFL). He was released on March 19.

=== Calgary Stampeders ===
On April 9, 2026, Alexander signed with the Calgary Stampeders of the Canadian Football League (CFL).
