= Loreauville High School =

Location
- 410 North Main Street; Loreauville, Iberia Parish, Louisiana 70552; United States; 30.0593°N 91.7370°W

Information
- Type: Public
- Motto: Let's be prepared, have self control, and show respect in order to achieve academic excellence.
- Established: 1940
- Status: Open
- School board: Iberia Parish School Board
- NCES District ID: 2200720
- Superintendent: Heath Hulin
- NCES School ID: 220072000527
- Principal: David Broussard
- Teaching staff: 34.35 (on an FTE basis)
- Grades: 9–12
- Enrollment: 588 (2023-2024)
- Student to teacher ratio: 17.12
- Campus type: Large Suburb
- Colors: Black and gold
- Athletics conference: LHSAA
- Mascot: Tigers
- Nickname: Bayou Bengals
- Team name: Tigers
- Graduates: 89%
- Website: lhs.iberiaschools.org

Loreauville High School (LHS) is a public high school located in Loreauville, Louisiana, United States, at 410 North Main Street. It is a part of Iberia Parish Public Schools. It is a public high school.

== History of LHS ==
During the Civil Rights Movement, LHS experienced a significant event in 1969 when it became fully integrated. African American students gained equal access to education alongside their white peers. The area near LHS was home to one of the first museums dedicated to the history of the Acadians and Cajun culture. This museum, known as The Heritage Village, stood on Main Street. One of five public High Schools in Iberia Parish Louisiana. The school continues to serve local students from 7th Grade through 12th grade. This masonry and wood facility was constructed in the early 1940s. The main building has been renovated, expanded, and modernized over the years to accommodate a growing student population. The main building in the 1940s housed all of Loreauville's student population, and as the village grew in population, additional facilities were added. The original central building may be the oldest school facility in continuous use in Iberia Parish. For many years, one of the first museums in Southern Louisiana dedicated to the history of the Acadians and the Cajun culture was on Main Street near the present-day Loreauville High School. The museum was privately owned and funded by a local resident well versed in the history and culture of the Acadians. The Museum site was located behind a private home West of School Drive and North of the existing Loreauville High School Gymnasium. The Museum area was largely an outdoors facility in a large horseshoe shape with the apex of the horseshoe near Bayou Teche. The Museum was in operation from approximately 1970 until the early 1980s. Several period buildings were donated to the museum from local residents and moved to the site, including the original one room schoolhouse that was used in Loreauville between 1900 and 1925. Other displays in the museum celebrated local Cajun culture with displays of period clothing, housewares, and early historic relics from the 19th century. A small collection of the artifacts from the Loreauville Museum were donated to the Acadian Village upon the closure of the Loreauville Museum.

== Enrollment Characteristics (2022-2023 school year) ==
Enrollment by Grade:

112 students in 7th grade,

89 in 8th grade,

89 in 9th grade,

103 in 10th grade,

100 in 11th grade,

and 76 in 12th grade.

Enrollment by Race/Ethnicity:

Currently in the school year of 2023-2024, the demographics for the student body are 437 White, 97 African-American, 7 Hispanic, 1 Asian, and 27 two or more races.

Enrollment by Gender:

289 students are male and 280 students are female, which make up a total of 569 students.

Administration

- Principal - David Broussard
- Assistant Principal - Laine Judice
- Administrative Assistant - Liz Hebert
- Administrative Assistant - John Munnerlyn
- Counselor - Spud Webb
- Counselor - Christian Pickle

== Athletics ==
Loreauville High School athletics competes in the LHSAA.

List of sports:

- zye game
- Men's Baseball
- Basketball
- Cheerleading
- Dance Team
- Men's Football
- Women's Softball
- Men's Bass Team

== Notable alumni ==
- Zy Alexander – College football cornerback for the Southeastern Louisiana Lions and the LSU Tigers
- Lionel Vital — NFL player and executive
- Kylon Polk – Safety at Louisiana Christian University
