= Cole Kelley =

American football player (born 1997)

No. 15
- Position: Quarterback

Personal information
- Born: October 27, 1997 (age 29); Lafayette, Louisiana, U.S.
- Listed height: 6 ft 7 in (2.01 m)
- Listed weight: 250 lb (113 kg)

Career information
- High school: Teurlings Catholic (Lafayette)
- College: Arkansas (2016–2018); Southeastern Louisiana (2019–2021)
- NFL draft: 2022: undrafted

Career history
- Washington Commanders (2022)*; Memphis Showboats (2023)
- * Offseason or practice squad member only

Awards and highlights
- Walter Payton Award (2020); First-team FCS All-American (2020, 2021); SLC Offensive Player of the Year (2020); Second-team All-SLC (2020); NFLPA Collegiate Bowl MVP (2022)
- Stats at Pro Football Reference

Cole Kelley (born October 27, 1997) is an American former professional football quarterback. He played college football for the Arkansas Razorbacks and Southeastern Louisiana Lions. Kelley signed with the Washington Commanders as an undrafted free agent in 2022 but was released prior to the season.

== College career ==
Kelley played football and basketball at Teurlings Catholic High School in Lafayette, Louisiana. He joined the University of Arkansas as a four-star recruit in 2016. He started four games as a redshirt freshman in 2017 and two games the following year before transferring to Southeastern Louisiana University in 2019.

=== 2020 season ===
Kelley won the Walter Payton Award for the 2020–21 FCS season, given to the top offensive player in the NCAA Division I Football Championship Subdivision (FCS). He threw for 2,662 yards and 18 touchdowns in 2020. Among these games, he threw for more than 300 yards in every game. He received first-team All-American FCS honors in both 2020 and 2021.

=== 2021 season ===
The 2021 season was the best year for Kelley. He threw for 5,124 yards, 44 touchdowns, and ran for 491 yards and 16 more touchdowns. Among those games was a 647 yard game in a loss at UIW, where he also had 68 attempts. He had a 285.0 passer rating in a game against Northwestern State, which would count as a perfect passer rating for NFL standards. Because of his exceptional performance that year, he was invited to the January 2022 edition of the NFLPA Collegiate Bowl and was named the game MVP.

=== Statistics ===
Legend
	FCS record
**Bold**	Career high

Season	Team	Games			Passing								Rushing			
Season	Team	GP	GS	Record	Cmp	Att	Pct	Yds	Y/A	TD	Int	Rtg	Att	Yds	Avg	TD
2017	Arkansas	0	0	—	Redshirted (redshirt)											
2017	Arkansas	9	4	2–2	87	151	57.6	1,038	6.9	8	4	127.5	53	74	1.4	2
2018	Arkansas	9	2	1–1	35	67	52.2	455	6.8	5	5	119.0	28	73	2.6	3
2019	Southeastern	13	0	—	69	93	**74.2**	810	8.8	10	2	**179.1**	89	200	2.3	10
2020	Southeastern	7	7	4–3	210	305	68.9	2,662	8.8	18	4	159.0	76	46	0.6	7
2021	Southeastern	13	13	9–4	**406**	**552**	73.6	**5,124**	**9.3**	**44**	**10**	174.2	**161**	**485**	**3.0**	**16**
FBS career		18	6	3–3	122	218	56.0	1,493	6.8	13	9	124.9	81	147	1.8	5
FCS career		33	20	13–7	685	950	72.1	8,602	9.1	72	16	169.8	326	731	2.2	33

== Professional career ==
Pre-draft measurables
Height	Weight	Arm length	Hand span	Wingspan	40-yard dash	10-yard split	20-yard split	20-yard shuttle	Three-cone drill
6 ft 7 3/8 in (2.02 m)	249 lb (113 kg)	33 3/4 in (0.86 m)	9 7/8 in (0.25 m)	6 ft 9 1/4 in (2.06 m)	5.14 s	1.70 s	3.00 s	4.98 s	8.00 s
All values from NFL Combine/Pro Day

=== Washington Commanders ===
Kelley signed with the Washington Commanders as an undrafted free agent on May 2, 2022, but was released on August 7.

=== Memphis Showboats ===
On January 28, 2023, Kelley signed with the Memphis Showboats of the United States Football League (USFL). He was released on March 12, 2024.
