= Dai'Jean Dixon =

American football player (born 1998)

Profile
- Position: Wide receiver

Personal information
- Born: October 16, 1998 (age 28); New Orleans, Louisiana
- Listed height: 6 ft 3 in (1.91 m)
- Listed weight: 205 lb (93 kg)

Career information
- High school: Edna Karr (New Orleans, LA)
- College: Nicholls (2017–2021)
- NFL draft: 2022: undrafted

Career history
- New Orleans Saints (2022)*; San Antonio Brahmas (2023)*
- * Offseason or practice squad member only

Awards and highlights
- 3× First-team All-SLC (2019–2021); Second-team All-SLC (2018)
- Stats at Pro Football Reference

Dai'Jean Dixon (born October 16, 1998) is an American football wide receiver. He played college football at Nicholls.

== Early life ==
Dixon attended Edna Karr High School in New Orleans. In January, 2016, Dixon was accused of sexual assault. Though he was not charged, many schools would no longer recruit him. He played football and basketball at Edna Karr. In his senior season, Dixon recorded 42 catches, 1,004 yards, and 11 touchdowns. That year, Edna Karr won the state championship. He was an unranked recruit by most recruiting services and he committed to Nicholls State University after a last minute scholarship offer.

== College career ==
In five years with Nicholls, Dixon recorded 35 touchdowns, 3,802 yards, and 236 receptions while being regarded as one of the best wide receivers in Southland and Nicholls history. He holds the Nicholls' record for career receiving yards, touchdowns, and receptions surpassing Mark Carrier. In August 2019, Dixon was arrested for possession of marijuana. He was named to the Second-team All-Southland in 2018 and the First-team All-Southland in 2019, 2020–21, and 2021. He entered the 2022 NFL draft at the conclusion of his collegiate career.

== Professional career ==
Pre-draft measurables
Height	Weight	Arm length	Hand span	Wingspan	40-yard dash	10-yard split	20-yard split	20-yard shuttle	Three-cone drill	Vertical jump	Broad jump	Bench press
6 ft 2 5/8 in (1.90 m)	205 lb (93 kg)	32 3/8 in (0.82 m)	9 1/2 in (0.24 m)	6 ft 6 3/8 in (1.99 m)	4.62 s	1.59 s	2.63 s	4.42 s	7.28 s	34.0 in (0.86 m)	10 ft 5 in (3.18 m)	2 reps
All values from NFL Combine/Pro Day

Dixon signed with the New Orleans Saints as an undrafted free agent on April 30, 2022. He was waived on August 30, 2022 and signed to the practice squad the next day. He was released on September 13, 2022.

== Personal life ==
Dixon is the cousin of former NFL safety Kendrick Lewis and the cousin of current NFL linebacker Deion Jones.
